= Miss Universe Netherlands =

Beauty pageant

- Formation: 2024; 2 years ago
- Type: Beauty pageant
- Headquarters: Amsterdam
- Location: Netherlands
- Members: Miss Universe
- Official language: Dutch
- National Director: Milou Verhoeks
- Website: www.missuniversenetherlands.nl

Miss Universe Netherlands is a national beauty pageant which select a representative of Netherlands to the Miss Universe pageant.

== History ==
In 2024, Milou Verhoeks became the national director of the Miss Universe Netherlands. Verhoeks is also the national director of Miss Beauty of the Netherlands, the beauty pageants that send Netherlands' representative to Miss Earth. Before 2024, the Miss Nederland was the beauty pageants to select the representatives to Miss Universe.

=== Former pageant ===
From 1929 to 1931, the Netherlands held a national pageant in Amsterdam for the first time called "Miss Holland". From 1932 to 1949 the pageant was briefly discontinued and later recommenced in 1951 by the Miss Holland Organization.

In 1956 the Netherlands debuted at the Miss Universe pageant. The national beauty pageant was called "Miss Holland" from 1950 until 1990, since that year the winner competed at the Miss Universe, while runners-up traditionally competed at the Miss World pageant and the Miss International pageant. Since 1991 it became known as "Miss Nederland" whose winner went on to the Miss World pageant. From 1991 to 2008 the Miss Universe representatives were selected from "Miss Universe Netherlands" pageant. The program was televised live on Veronica television.

Netherlands didn't not compete at Miss Universe only in 5 ocations, in 1957, 1997, 1999, 2006 and 2007.

In 2009, Kim Kötter became the national director of the Netherlands. She competed at the Miss Universe 2002 in San Juan, Puerto Rico. Usually, the Miss Nederland titleholder will compete at both the Miss Universe and the Miss World pageant. In 2013, two winners were crowned as the Miss Netherlands Universe and Miss Netherlands World pageant to represent their country at the Miss Universe and Miss World pageants, respectively. In 2016, the Miss Nederland only had the Miss Universe franchise. In 2024, the Miss Nederland gave up the Miss Universe franchise and a new Miss Universe Netherlands pageant was established.

=== Organizers ===
- 1929–1976 — “Het Leven” (the Life)
- 1977–1978, 1995-1996 — Corinne Rottschaefer (De Telegraph)
- 1989-1990, 1998–2005 — Hans Konings (CEO) Miss Nederland 0rganisatie in cooperation with RTL4 and SBS6
- 1991–1994 — Miss Universe Nederland by Veronica TV
- 2006-2008 — Shaida Wever (CEO) Miss Universe Top Beauty Netherlands & Miss Curacao Pageant
- 2009–2019 — Kim Kötter
- 2020–2023 — Monica van Ee (Hannah)
- 2024―present ― Milou Verhoeks

=== Province formats ===
At Miss Universe Netherlands, candidates traditionally wear sashes representing their provinces. The final results include a Second Runner-up, a First Runner-up, and ultimately, the Miss Universe Netherlands winner.

- Miss Drenthe
- Miss Flevoland
- Miss Friesland
- Miss Gelderland
- Miss Gronigen
- Miss Limburg
- Miss North Brabant
- Miss North Holland
- Miss Overijssel
- Miss South Holland
- Miss Utrecht
- Miss Zeeland
- Miss Caribbean Netherlands

== Titleholders ==
- : Declared as Winner
- : Ended as runner-up or Top 5/6 qualification
- : Ended as one of the finalists or semifinalists
- : Ended as special awards winner

Year	Province	Miss Netherlands	National Title	Placement at Miss Universe	Special awards
Milou Verhoeks directorship "Miss Beauty of the Netherlands" — a franchise holder to Miss Universe from 2024
2026	Groningen	Melissa Bottema	Miss Nederland 2026	TBA	
2025	North Holland	Nathalie Yasmin Mogbelzada	MU Netherlands 2025	Top 30	
2024	North Holland	Faith Landman	MU Netherlands 2024	Unplaced	
Monica van Ee (Hannah) "Miss Nederland" directorship — a franchise holder to Miss Universe between 2020―2023
2023	North Holland	Rikkie Kollé	Miss Nederland 2023	Unplaced	
2022	North Holland	Ona Moody	Miss Nederland 2022	Unplaced	
2021	North Holland	Julia Sinning	Miss Nederland 2021	Unplaced	
2020	Groningen	Denise Speelman	Miss Nederland 2020	Unplaced	
Kim Kötter directorship "Miss Nederland" — a franchise holder to Miss Universe between 2009―2019
2019	South Holland	Sharon Pieksma	Miss Nederland 2019	Unplaced	
2018	South Holland	Rahima Ayla Dirkse	Miss Nederland 2018	Unplaced	
2017	Utrecht	Nicky Opheij	Miss Nederland 2017	Unplaced	
2016	Flevoland	Zoey Ivory	Miss Nederland 2016	Unplaced	
2015	North Holland	Jessie Jazz Vuijk	Miss Nederland 2015	Unplaced	
2014	North Holland	Yasmin Verheijen	Miss Nederland 2014	3rd Runner-up	
2013	North Holland	Stephanie Tency	Miss Nederland 2013	Unplaced	
2012	North Holland	Nathalie den Dekker	Miss Nederland 2012	Unplaced	Best National Costume (2nd Runner-up)
2011	Limburg	Kelly Weekers	Miss Nederland 2011	Top 16	
2010	North Holland	Desirée van den Berg	Miss Nederland 2010	Unplaced	
2009	Flevoland	Avalon-Chanel Weyzig	Miss Nederland 2009	Unplaced	
Sheida Wever directorship "Miss Universe Top Model Netherlands" — a franchise holder to Miss Universe in 2008
2008	South Holland	Charlotte Labee	MU Top Model Netherlands 2008	Unplaced	
SBS6 directorship "Miss Universe Nederland" — a franchise holder to Miss Universe between 1998―2005
Did not compete between 2006—2007
2005	Utrecht	Sharita Sopacua	MU Nederland 2005	Unplaced	
2004	North Brabant	Lindsay Grace Pronk	MU Nederland 2004	Unplaced	
2003	South Holland	Tessa Brix	MU Nederland 2003	Unplaced	
2002	Overijssel	Kim Kötter	MU Nederland 2002	Unplaced	
2001	South Holland	Reshma Roopram	MU Nederland 2001	Unplaced	
2000	North Brabant	Chantal van Roessel	MU Nederland 2000	Unplaced	
Did not compete in 1999
1998	North Holland	Jacqueline Rotteveel	MU Nederland 1998	Unplaced	
Corinne Rottschaefer (De Telegraph) directorship "Miss Universe Nederland" — a franchise holder to Miss Universe between 1995―1996
Did not compete in 1997
1996	Drenthe	Marja de Graaf	MU Nederland 1996	Unplaced	
1995	Zeeland	Chantal van Woensel	MU Nederland 1995	Unplaced	
Veronica TV directorship "Miss Universe Nederland" — a franchise holder to Miss Universe between 1991―1994
1994	South Holland	Irene van de Laar	MU Nederland 1994	Unplaced	
1993	North Holland	Angelique van Zalen	MU Nederland 1993	Unplaced	
1992	North Brabant	Vivian Jansen	MU Nederland 1992	Top 6	
1991	Utrecht	Paulien Huizinga	MU Nederland 1991	1st Runner-up	
Het Leven Magazine directorship "Miss Holland" — a franchise holder to Miss Universe between 1979―1990
1990	North Holland	Stephanie Halenbeek	Miss Holland 1989	Unplaced	
1989	South Holland	Angela Visser	Miss Holland 1988	Miss Universe 1989	
1988	North Holland	Annabet Berendsen	Miss Holland 1987; 3rd Runner-up	Unplaced	
1987	Overijssel	Janny ter Velde	Miss Holland 1986	Unplaced	
1986	North Holland	Caroline Veldkamp	Miss Holland 1985; 2nd Runner-up	Unplaced	
1985	Utrecht	Brigitte Bergman	Miss Holland 1983; 1st Runner-up	Unplaced	
1984	North Holland	Nancy Neede	Miss Holland 1984	Top 10	
1983	North Holland	Nancy Lalleman-Heijnis	Miss Holland 1983	Unplaced	
1982	North Holland	Brigitte Dierickx	Miss Holland 1982	Unplaced	
1981	South Holland	Ingrid Schouten	Miss Holland 1981	Top 12	
1980	Gelderland	Karin Gooyer	Miss Holland 1980	Unplaced	
1979	South Holland	Eunice Bharatsing	Miss Holland 1979	Unplaced	
Corinne Rottschaefer (De Telegraph) directorship "Miss Holland" — a franchise holder to Miss Universe between 1977―1978
1978	North Holland	Karin Gustafsson	Miss Holland 1978	Top 12	
1977	North Holland	Ineke Berends	Miss Holland 1977	Top 12	
Het Leven Magazine directorship "Miss Holland" — a franchise holder to Miss Universe between 1956―1976
1976	North Holland	Nannetje Nielen	Miss Holland 1976; 1st Runner-up	Unplaced	
1975	North Holland	Lynda Snippe	Miss Holland 1975	Unplaced	
1974	North Brabant	Nicoline Broeckx	Miss Holland 1974	Unplaced	
1973	—	Monique Borgeld	Miss Holland 1973; Appointed from Miss Holland 1973 Contestant	Unplaced	
1972	Groningen	Jenny Ten Wolde	Miss Holland 1972	Unplaced	
1971	North Holland	Laura Mulder-Smid	Miss Holland 1971	Unplaced	
1970	—	Maureen Renzen	Miss Holland 1970	Unplaced	
1969	—	Welmoed Hollenberg	Miss Holland 1969	Unplaced	
1968	—	Nathalie Heyl	Miss Holland 1968; 1st Runner-up	Unplaced	
1967	South Holland	Irene van Campenhout	Miss Holland 1967	Top 15	
1966	South Holland	Margo Domen	Miss Holland 1966	Top 15	
1965	North Holland	Anja Maria Schuit	Miss Holland 1965	4th Runner-up	
1964	—	Henny Deul	Miss Holland 1964; 3rd Runner-up	Unplaced	Best National Costume
1963	Gelderland	Elsa Onstenk	Miss Holland 1963; 2nd Runner-up	Unplaced	
1962	—	Marjan van der Heijden	Miss Holland 1962; 1st Runner-up	Unplaced	
1961	—	Gita Kamman	Miss Holland 1961; 1st Runner-up	Unplaced	
1960	—	Carinna Verbeck	Miss Holland 1960; 3rd Runner-up	Unplaced	
1959	North Holland	Peggy Erwich	Miss Holland 1959	Unplaced	
1958	North Holland	Corine Rottschafer	Miss Holland 1957	Top 16	
Did not compete in 1957
1956	North Holland	Rita Schmidt	Miss Holland 1956	Unplaced	
