= Miss Nederland =

National beauty pageant competition in the Netherlands

Miss Nederland Organisatie
- Miss Nederland Organisatie
- Formation: 1929; 97 years ago
- Type: Beauty pageant
- Headquarters: Amsterdam
- Location: Netherlands
- Members: Miss Universe Netherlands
- Official language: Dutch
- President: Monica van Ee (Hannah)
- Website: www.missnederland.nl

The Miss Nederland is a national beauty pageant in the Netherlands. The pageant was founded in 1929 in Amsterdam.

== History ==
=== Former pageant ===
From 1929 to 1931, the Netherlands held a national pageant in Amsterdam for the first time called "Miss Holland". From 1932 to 1949 the pageant was briefly discontinued and later recommenced in 1951 by the Miss Holland Organization.

In 1951 the Netherlands debuted at the Miss World pageant and the Miss Universe pageant in 1956. The national beauty pageant was called "Miss Holland" from 1950 until 1990, since that year the winner competed at the Miss Universe, while runners-up traditionally competed at the Miss World pageant and the Miss International pageant. Since 1991 it became known as "Miss Nederland" whose winner went on to the Miss World pageant. From 1991 to 2008 the Miss Universe representatives were selected from "Miss Universe Netherlands" pageant. The program was televised live on Veronica television.

=== Organizers ===
- 1929–1976 — “Het Leven” (the Life)
- 1977–1978 — Corinne Rottschaefer (De Telegraph)
- 1989–2008 — Hans Konings (CEO) Miss Nederland Organisatie in cooperation with RTL4 and SBS6
- 1991–1994 — Miss Universe Nederland by Veronica TV
- 2009–2019 — Kim Kötter
- 2020–Present — Monica van Ee (Hannah)

=== Miss Nederland Organisation ===
In 2009, Kim Kötter became the national director of the Netherlands. She competed at the Miss Universe 2002 in San Juan, Puerto Rico. Usually, the Miss Nederland titleholder will compete at both the Miss Universe and the Miss World pageant. In 2013, two winners were crowned as the Miss Netherlands Universe and Miss Netherlands World pageant to represent their country at the Miss Universe and Miss World pageants, respectively. In 2016, the Miss Nederland only had the Miss Universe franchise. In 2024, the Miss Nederland gave up the Miss Universe franchise and a new Miss Universe Netherlands pageant was established.

== Titleholders ==
The magazine “Het Leven” (the Life) organised the first Miss Holland pageant. The winners of Miss Holland between 1929 and 1935 attended International Pageant of Pulchritude (Miss Universe) in Galveston, USA. Later from 1991 to 2008 the Miss Universe Nederland pageant was broadcast live on Veronica television. In 2009 Kim Kötter got also the right to send a girl to the Miss World pageant. She also took over the Miss Nederland franchise. Since that year Miss Nederland winner goes to Miss Universe pageant.

Year	Miss Nederland	Age	City	Province	Notes
1929	Johanna Koopman	—	Zaandam	North Holland	
1930	Emmy Kuster	28	The Hague	South Holland	Disqualified for falsifying her age; the age limit is 25 and she was 28 at the time, and was a mother to an 8-year old child
1930	Rie van der Rest	—	Ginneken en Bavel	North Brabant	Replaced Emmy Kuster
1931	Mary van Lelyveld	17	Amsterdam	North Holland	Mary was just 17 when she won the pageant. She was a student but because she missed too many classes because of her duties as Miss Holland she was dispelled from school
1932	Carolina Geels	18	The Hague	South Holland	
1934	Sonja Coers	—	—	—	
1935	Stella Elte	23	The Hague	South Holland	
1936	Mia Kramer	—	—	—	
1937	Elisa Schimpf	17	Gooi	North Holland	Did not compete at Miss Europe after her mother did not allow her to compete
1948	Mary Jochemse	22	Amsterdam	North Holland	
1950	Hilda Lesman	21	Amsterdam	North Holland	
1951	Elisabeth van Proosdij	20	Amsterdam	North Holland	Did not compete at Miss World 1952 because she got married during her reign as Miss Holland
1952	Yvonne Meyer	20	Haarlem	North Holland	
1954	Conny Harteveld	22	Leiden	South Holland	
1955	Angelina Kalkhoven	18	Amsterdam	North Holland	
1956	Rita Schmidt	20	Alkmaar	North Holland	When Rita got married in January 1957, Ans van Pothoven took over the duties of Miss Holland 1956
1957	Corine Rottschäfer	19	Amsterdam	North Holland	Miss Europe 1957, Miss World 1959
1958	Luciënne Struve	19	Rotterdam	South Holland	
1959	Peggy Erwich	21	Rotterdam	South Holland	Did not compete at Miss World 1959 due to commitments in modelling
1960	Ans Schoon	20	Amsterdam	North Holland	Did not compete at Miss World 1960 as she was in another country when her registration form came
1961	Anne Marie Brink	20	Doetinchem	Gelderland	
1962	Catharina Lodders	20	Haarlem	North Holland	Miss World 1962
1963	Godelieve Sassen	21	The Hague	South Holland	
1964	Elly Koot	20	Amsterdam	North Holland	Miss Europe 1964
1965	Anja Maria Schuit	21	Amsterdam	North Holland	
1966	Margo Domen	24	The Hague	South Holland	
1967	Irene van Campenhout	20	The Hague	South Holland	
1968	Marjolein Abbing	18	Amsterdam	North Holland	
1969	Welmoed Hollenberg	21	Amsterdam	North Holland	
1970	Maureen Renzen			—	
1971	Laura Mulder-Smid			North Holland	
1972	Jenny ten Wolde			Groningen	
1973	Yildiz de Kat			—	
1974	Nicoline Broeckx			North Brabant	
1975	Lynda Snippe			North Holland	
1976	Lucie Visser			—	Dethroned
1977	Ineke Berends			North Holland	Miss Holland - Corinne Rottschaefer (De Telegraph) directorship
1978	Karin Gustafsson			North Holland	
1979	Eunice Bharatsing			South Holland	
1980	Karin Gooyer			Gelderland	
1981	Ingrid Schouten			South Holland	
1982	Brigitte Dierickx			North Holland	
1983	Nancy Lalleman-Heijnis			North Holland	
1984	Nancy Neede			North Holland	
1985	Pasquale Somers			—	Dethroned (later retained title)
1986	Janny ter Velde			Overijssel	
1987	Angelique Cremers			—	
1988	Angela Visser			South Holland	Miss Universe 1989
1989	Stephanie Halenbeek			North Holland	The last Miss Holland 1989 and renamed as Miss Universe Nederland in 1991
1989	Liesbeth Caspers			—	Miss Netherlands Organization
1990	Gabriëlle Stap			—	
1991	Paulien Huizinga			Utrecht	Miss Universe Nederland — Veronica TV
1991	Linda Egging			—	
1992	Vivian Jansen			North Brabant	
1992	Gaby van Nimwegen			—	
1993	Angelique van Zalen			North Holland	
1993	Hilda Vermeulen			Friesland	
1994	Irene van de Laar			South Holland	
1994	Yoshka Bon			North Holland	
1995	Chantal van Woensel			Zeeland	Miss Universe Nederland — Corinne Rottschaefer (De Telegraph) directorship
1995	Didie Schackman			Gelderland	
1996	Marja de Graaf			Drenthe	
1996	Petra Hoost			North Holland	
1997	Sonja Silva			—	
1998	Jacqueline Rotteveel			North Holland	Miss Universe Nederland — SBS6 directorship
1998	Nerena Ruinemans			—	
2000	Chantal van Roessel			North Brabant	
2000	Raja Moussaoui			Limburg	
2001	Reshma Roopram			South Holland	
2001	Irena Pantelic			—	
2002	Kim Kötter			Overijssel	President of Miss Nederland
2002	Elise Boulogne			South Holland	
2003	Tessa Brix			South Holland	
2003	Sanne de Regt			—	
2004	Lindsay Grace Pronk			North Brabant	
2004	Miranda Slabber			Zeeland	
2005	Sharita Sopacua			Utrecht	
2006	Sheryl Lynn Baas			South Holland	Mrs Globe 2012
2007	Melissa Sneekes			South Holland	
2008	Charlotte Labee			South Holland	Miss Universe Top Beauty Netherlands — Shaida Wever directorship
2008	Deniz Akkoyun			Utrecht	
2009	Avalon-Chanel Weyzig			Flevoland	Miss Nederland — Kim Kötter directorship
2010	Desirée van den Berg			North Holland	
2011	Kelly Weekers			Limburg	
2012	Nathalie den Dekker			North Holland	
2013	Stephanie Tency			North Holland	
2014	Yasmin Verheijen			North Holland	
2015	Jessie Jazz Vuijk			North Holland	
2016	Zoey Ivory			Flevoland	
2017	Nicky Opheij			Utrecht	
2018	Rahima Ayla Dirkse			South Holland	
2019	Sharon Pieksma			South Holland	
2020	Denise Speelman			Groningen	Monica van Ee (Hannah) directorship
2021	Julia Sinning			North Holland	
2022	Ona Moody			North Holland	
2023	Rikkie Kollé			North Brabant	
2026	Melissa Bottema			Groningen	

== Results ==
Year	Miss Nederland	1st Runner-up	2nd Runner-up	3rd Runner-up	4th Runner-up	5th Runner-up
1929	Johanna Koopman	Lydie Maschmeijer	Beppie Zadlick	M.C. de Wilde	J. Westerman	—
1930	Elly Kuster	Rie van der Rest	—	—	—	—
1931	Marie van Lelyveld	—	—	—	—	—
1932	Carolina Geels	Mouchette Alard	Marguerite de Vries	—	—	—
1934	Sonja Coers	—	—	—	—	—
1935	Stella Elte	—	—	—	—	—
1936	Mia Kramer	—	—	—	—	—
1937	Elisa Schimpf	—	—	—	—	—
1948	Mary Jochemse	—	—	—	—	—
1950	Hilda Lesman	—	—	—	—	—
1951	Elisabeth van Proosdij	Sanny Weitner	Riet van der Aa	Elly Manvis	J. Sandifort	—
1952	Yvonne Meyer	Joyce van Laar	Manon van Waay	—	—	—
1954	Conny Harteveld	—	—	—	—	—
1955	Angelina Kalkhoven	—	—	—	—	—
1956	Rita Schmidt	Ans van Pothoven	Maud Hoyer	Nicole Kiks	Maria de Wilde	—
1957	Corine Rottschäfer	Debbie Posno	Christina van der Zijp	Sonja Tenge	Ria Burry	—
1958	Luciënne Struve	Peggy Erwich	—	—	—	—
1959	Peggy Erwich	Yvonne Smid	Ansje Schoon	Petra Paul	Fransje Meyer	Mimi Methorst
1960	Ans Schoon	Katinka Bleeker	Ada Stuyt	Carina Verbeek	—	—
1961	Anne Marie Brink	Gita Gamman	Constance (Stanny) Baer	Rita van Zuiden	Sylvia Glas	—
1962	Catharina Lodders	Marjan van der Heijden	Trudi van Sark	Roza van der Lee	Manny Horselenberg	—
1963	Godelieve Sassen	Juno Onink	Elsa Onstenk	Hanny IJsebrands	Els Kaptein	—
1964	Elly Koot	Els kaptein	Renske van den Berg	Henny Deul	Marjan Puyk	—
1965	Anja Maria Schuit	Elaine Bollen	Janny de Knecht	Femke van de Bos	Marijke van de Pol	—
1966	Margo Domen	Sandrina van Senus	Simone Arentz	Anneke Geerts	Gerda Wijma	—
1967	Irene van Campenhout	Nente van der Vliet	Monica van Beelen	—	—	—
1968	Marjolein Abbing	Nathalie Heyl	Ada Grootenboer	Cecile van der Lelie	—	—
1969	Welmoed Hollenberg	Nente van der Vliet	Olga Westmaas	Maria Lingen	Patricia Hollman	—
1970	Maureen Renzen	Patricia Hollman	Stephanie Flatow	Anja Brand	—	—
1971	Laura Mulder-Smid	Mieke Grishaver	Pia Solleveld	Monica Strottman	Ans Krupp	—
1972	Jenny ten Wolde	Monica Strotmann	Marga Scheide	Monique Borgeld	Marga Kramer	—
1973	Yildiz de Kat	Anke Groot	Conja Mosk	Marie-Louis Ultee	Charlotte Jautze	—
1974	Nicoline Broeckx	Gerarda Sophia Balm	Lise van Dort	Nanna Beetstra	Tilla van Mullekom	—
1975	Lynda Snippe	Cora Kitz	Barbara Ann Neefs	Nanny Nielen	Ellen Soeters	—
1976	Lucie Visser	Nanny Nielen	Stephanie Flatow	Barbara Ann Neefs	Willy Leedekerke	—
1977	Ineke Berends	Willie Muis	Caroline Hooft	Petra Roest	Conny Geurdes	—
1978	Karin Gustafsson	Ans van Haaster	Nicole Cohen	Nanny Nielen	—	—
1979	Eunice Bharatsing	Marlene Vemeulen	Nanny Nielen	Mary Kruyssen	Hetty van Koningsbergen	—
1980	Karin Gooyer	Desiree Geelen	Inge Klok	Jacqueline Boertien	Jeanette Akker	—
1981	Ingrid Schouten	Saskia Lemmers	Ine Hoedemaeckers	Donna Melief	Shirley Mescher	Mandy de Ruijter
1982	Brigitte Dierickx	Irene Schell	Dingena Andriessen	Diana Timmers	Debby Plugers	—
1983	Nancy Lalleman-Heijnis	Brigitte Bergman	Marion van de Stolpe	Nicole Bennink	Carina Serrarens	—
1984	Nancy Neede	Rosalie van Breemen	Jacomina Versteeg	Tineke van Altena	Pearl MacNack	—
1985	Pasquale Somers	Mandy Jacobs	Caroline Veldkamp	Bonita Baarda	—	—
1986	Janny ter Velde	Sophia de Boer	Angelique Erens	Angelique Cremers	Monique Stiphout	—
1987	Angelique Cremers	Jacqueline van Staa	Ellis Adriaensen	Annebet Berendsen	Mascha ten Haaf	Margriet de Vries
1988	Angela Visser	Nandy Hendrikx	Deborah Kiela	Saskia van Marrelo	Manou Bleeker	Ghislaine Niewold
1989	Stephanie Halenbeek ↓ "Miss Holland"	Yvonne Lokers	Francis Potkamp	Monique Flinkevleugel	Esther den Otter	Elizabeth Bijl
1989	Liesbeth Caspers ↓ "Miss Nederland"	Karin van der Gaarden	Carina Jongkind	—	—	—
1990	Gabriëlle Stap	Meliza Garmers	Jill Nayci	—	—	—
1991	Paulien Huizinga ↓ "Miss Universe Nederland"	—	—	—	—	—
1991	Linda Egging ↓ "Miss Nederland"	—	—	—	—	—
1992	Vivian Jansen ↓ "Miss Universe Nederland"	—	—	—	—	—
1992	Gaby van Nimwegen ↓ "Miss Nederland"	Unknown	Nancy Lammers	—	—	—
1993	Angelique van Zalen ↓ "Miss Universe Nederland"	—	—	—	—	—
1993	Hilda Vermeulen ↓ "Miss Nederland"	Patricia Brok	Mariëlle Jansen	Ilona van Hunen	Noëlle ter Woerds	Monique Sterchel
1994	Irene van de Laar ↓ "Miss Universe Nederland"	Sabine te Vrede	Natascha Louwen	—	—	—
1994	Yoshka Bon ↓ "Miss Nederland"	Manon Ellérie	Mirelle Cloosterman	Sharon Mafficioli	Kirsten Kretz	Natasja Ploeger
1995	Chantal van Woensel ↓ "Miss Universe Nederland"	Kaysa de Haan	Nathalie van den Dungen	—	—	—
1995	Didie Schackman ↓ "Miss Nederland"	Devi van Huijstee	Viveke van de Broek	Dominique Weerwind	Joyce Wegman	Nancy van der Beek
1996	Marja de Graaf ↓ "Miss Universe Nederland"	Leoni Boon	Virginia Koopmans	—	—	—
1996	Petra Hoost ↓ "Miss Nederland"	Jenina Smink	Evelien Nuijlen	Tooske Breugem	Jessica Veenhuis	—
1997	Sonja Silva	Dunja Muskens	Nadine Ben Moussa	—	—	—
1998	Jacqueline Rotteveel ↓ "Miss Universe Nederland"	Mirjam Bouwman	Jessica Veenhuis	—	—	—
1998	Nerena Ruinemans ↓ "Miss Nederland"	Angela du Bois	Marlouke van Heijningen	—	—	—
2000	Chantal van Roessel ↓ "Miss Universe Nederland"	Caroline Heyboer	Maya Havelaar	—	—	—
2000	Raja Moussaoui ↓ "Miss Nederland"	Reshma Roopram	Sharon Looyen	—	—	—
2001	Reshma Roopram ↓ "Miss Universe Nederland"	Touriya Haoud	Monique van Bokkum	—	—	—
2001	Irena Pantelic ↓ "Miss Nederland"	Jacobijn Slegtkamp	Sara-Lynn Dijkhof	—	—	—
2002	Kim Kötter ↓ "Miss Universe Nederland"	Hyke Bierman	Bibiënne Vossepoel	—	—	—
2002	Elise Boulogne ↓ "Miss Nederland"	Saskia van der Molen	Nadine de Vries	—	—	—
2003	Tessa Brix ↓ "Miss Universe Nederland"	Marloes van der Stadt	Nianga Niang	—	—	—
2003	Sanne de Regt ↓ "Miss Nederland"	Nathalie Hassink	Femke Fredriks	—	—	—
2004	Lindsay Grace Pronk ↓ "Miss Universe Nederland"	Lianne Langkamp	Marina Poldervaart	—	—	—
2004	Miranda Slabber ↓ "Miss Nederland"	Anna Marie Hendriks	Sharita Sopacua	—	—	—
2005	Sharita Sopacua	Monique Plat	Eveline Jansen	—	—	—
2006	Sheryl Lynn Baas	Florencia Mulder	Leoni Lammers	—	—	—
2007	Melissa Sneekes	Aya Spijkerman	Liesbeth Faber	—	—	—
2008	Charlotte Labee ↓ "Miss Universe Top Beauty Netherlands by Sheida Wever"	Jelena Petrova	Milou Verhoeks	—	—	—
2008	Deniz Akkoyun ↓ "Miss Nederland"	Maaike Heethaar	Desirée van den Berg	—	—	—
2009	Avalon-Chanel Weyzig	Stephanie Bos	Stephanie Hartmann	Jolanda van Zeeland	Shanna Moes	Renee Trompert
2010	Desirée van den Berg	Jana Voyvodich	Gladys Fraenk	Bojoura Verwey	Petra Smits	Sevtap Ergec
2011	Kelly Weekers	Jill de Robles	Jill Duijves	Mary-Anne Kammeron	Pinar Arslan	Luna Voce
2012	Stephanie Tency	Jacqueline Steenbeek	Lauraine van der Werff	Chanel Feikens	Wendy-Kristy Hoogerbrugge	Tari Herzenberg
2013	Yasmin Verheijen	Tatjana Maul	Brendalina van Dorp	Fay Tholen	Laura van Rees	Christiana Terwilliger
2015	Jessie Jazz Vuijk	Margot Hanekamp	Janike Altena	—	—	—
2016	Zoey Ivory	Denise Swier	Kelly van den Dungen	—	—	—
2017	Nicky Opheij	Farrieda Smit	—	—	—	—
2018	Rahima Ayla Dirkse	Nina van den Broek	—	—	—	—
2019	Sharon Pieksma	Fabiënne Davelaar	—	—	—	—
2020	Denise Speelman	Sophie Alink	—	—	—	—
2021	Julia Sinning	Eleanor Dingemans	—	—	—	—
2022	Ona Moody	Eva van de Wetering	—	—	—	—
2023	Rikkie Kollé	Nathalie Mogbelzada	—	—	—	—
2026	Melissa Bottema					

== Current titleholders under Miss Nederland org. ==
=== Miss Universe Nederland ===
- : Declared as Winner
- : Ended as runner-up or top 5/6 qualification
- : Ended as one of the finalists or semifinalists
- : Ended as special awards winner

The winner of Miss Nederland former: "Miss Holland" represents her country at the Miss Universe pageant. On occasion, when the winner does not qualify (due to age) for either contest, a runner-up is sent.

Year	Province	Miss Universe Nederland	Placement at Miss Universe	Special Awards
2026	Groningen	Melissa Bottema		
2023	North Holland	Rikkie Kollé	Unplaced	
2022	North Holland	Ona Moody	Unplaced	
2021	North Holland	Julia Sinning	Unplaced	
2020	Groningen	Denise Speelman	Unplaced	
2019	South Holland	Sharon Pieksma	Unplaced	
2018	South Holland	Rahima Ayla Dirkse	Unplaced	
2017	Utrecht	Nicky Opheij	Unplaced	
2016	Flevoland	Zoey Ivory	Unplaced	
2015	North Holland	Jessie Jazz Vuijk	Unplaced	
2014	North Holland	Yasmin Verheijen	3rd Runner-up	
2013	North Holland	Stephanie Tency	Unplaced	
2012	North Holland	Nathalie den Dekker	Unplaced	Best National Costume (2nd Runner-up)
2011	Limburg	Kelly Weekers	Top 16	
2010	North Holland	Desirée van den Berg	Unplaced	
2009	Flevoland	Avalon-Chanel Weyzig	Unplaced	
Miss Universe Top Beauty Netherlands
2008	South Holland	Charlotte Labee	Unplaced	
Miss Universe Nederland
Did not compete between 2006—2007
2005	Utrecht	Sharita Sopacua	Unplaced	
2004	North Brabant	Lindsay Grace Pronk	Unplaced	
2003	South Holland	Tessa Brix	Unplaced	
2002	Overijssel	Kim Kötter	Unplaced	
2001	South Holland	Reshma Roopram	Unplaced	
2000	North Brabant	Chantal van Roessel	Unplaced	
1999	Did not compete			
1998	North Holland	Jacqueline Rotteveel	Unplaced	
1997	Did not compete			
1996	Drenthe	Marja de Graaf	Unplaced	
1995	Zeeland	Chantal van Woensel	Unplaced	
1994	South Holland	Irene van de Laar	Unplaced	
1993	North Holland	Angelique van Zalen	Unplaced	
1992	North Brabant	Vivian Jansen	Top 6	
1991	Utrecht	Paulien Huizinga	1st Runner-up	
Miss Holland
1990	North Holland	Stephanie Halenbeek	Unplaced	
1989	South Holland	Angela Visser	Miss Universe 1989	
1988	North Holland	Annabet Berendsen	Unplaced	
1987	Overijssel	Janny ter Velde	Unplaced	
1986	North Holland	Caroline Veldkamp	Unplaced	
1985	Utrecht	Brigitte Bergman	Unplaced	
1984	North Holland	Nancy Neede	Top 10	
1983	North Holland	Nancy Lalleman-Heijnis	Unplaced	
1982	North Holland	Brigitte Dierickx	Unplaced	
1981	South Holland	Ingrid Schouten	Top 12	
1980	Gelderland	Karin Gooyer	Unplaced	
1979	South Holland	Eunice Bharatsing	Unplaced	
1978	North Holland	Karin Gustafsson	Top 12	
1977	North Holland	Ineke Berends	Top 12	
1976	North Holland	Nannetje Nielen	Unplaced	
1975	North Holland	Lynda Snippe	Unplaced	
1974	North Brabant	Nicoline Broeckx	Unplaced	
1973	—	Monique Borgeld	Unplaced	
1972	Groningen	Jenny Ten Wolde	Unplaced	
1971	North Holland	Laura Mulder-Smid	Unplaced	
1970	—	Maureen Renzen	Unplaced	
1969	—	Welmoed Hollenberg	Unplaced	
1968	—	Nathalie Heyl	Unplaced	
1967	South Holland	Irene van Campenhout	Top 15	
1966	South Holland	Margo Domen	Top 15	
1965	North Holland	Anja Maria Schuit	4th Runner-up	
1964	—	Henny Deul	Unplaced	Best National Costume
1963	Gelderland	Elsa Onstenk	Unplaced	
1962	—	Marjan van der Heijden	Unplaced	
1961	—	Gita Kamman	Unplaced	
1960	—	Carinna Verbeck	Unplaced	
1959	North Holland	Peggy Erwich	Unplaced	
1958	North Holland	Corine Rottschafer	Top 16	
1957	Did not compete			
1956	North Holland	Rita Schmidt	Unplaced	

== Past titleholders under Miss Nederland org. ==
=== Miss World Nederland ===
- : Declared as Winner
- : Ended as runner-up or top 5/6 qualification
- : Ended as one of the finalists or semifinalists
- : Ended as special awards winner

Between 1951-1990 Netherlands was competed at the Miss World contest by Miss Holland 1st Runner-up or sometimes, Winner. While in 1991-2008 the Miss Netherlands selected the official candidate to the Miss World pageant. Between 1990 and 2008 Miss World Netherlands had selected by Miss Netherlands (Another agency Hans Konings). Between 2009 and 2015 Miss Nederland by Kim Kötter selects a runner-up to Miss World. Since 2016 the Miss World Netherlands is holding an official pageant to select a national winner for Miss World. The new franchise holder in the Netherlands, Katia Maes produced several successful Dutch young women in different pageants worldwide.

Year	Province	Miss World Nederland	Placement at Miss World	Special Awards
2015	Gelderland	Margot Hanekamp	Top 20	Miss World Top Model (Top 30)
2014	South Holland	Tatjana Maul	Top 25	Miss World Multimedia (Top 5); Beauty With a Purpose (Top 10)
2013	North Brabant	Jacqueline Steenbeek	Top 20	Miss World Sport
2012	North Holland	Nathalie den Dekker	Top 15	Miss World Sport (Top 24); Miss World Beach Beauty (Top 40)
2011	Drenthe	Jill Lauren de Robles	Unplaced	
2010	North Holland	Desirée van den Berg	Top 25	Miss World Beach Beauty (Top 20)
2009	Flevoland	Avalon-Chanel Weyzig	Unplaced	
Miss World Netherlands — official selection
2008	—	Carmen Selina Kool	Unplaced	
Miss Nederland (World)
2007	South Holland	Melissa Sneekes	Unplaced	
2006	South Holland	Sheryl Lynn Baas	Unplaced	
2005	—	Monique Plat	Unplaced	
2004	Zeeland	Miranda Slabber	Unplaced	
2003	—	Sanne de Regt	Unplaced	
2002	South Holland	Elise Boulogne	Top 20	
2001	—	Irena Pantelic	Unplaced	
2000	Limburg	Raja Moussaoui	Unplaced	
1999	—	Ilona Marilyn van Veldhuisen	Unplaced	
1998	—	Nerena Ruinemans	Unplaced	
1997	—	Sonja Silva	Unplaced	
1996	North Holland	Petra Hoost	Unplaced	
1995	Gelderland	Didie Schackman	Unplaced	
1994	North Holland	Yoshka Bon	Unplaced	
1993	Friesland	Hilda Vermeulen	Unplaced	
1992	—	Gaby van Nimwegen	Unplaced	
1991	—	Linda Egging	Unplaced	
1990	—	Gabriëlle Stap	Top 10	
1989	—	Liesbeth Caspers	Unplaced	
Dutch Representatives from Miss Holland
1988	South Holland	Angela Visser	Unplaced	
1987	—	Angelique Johanna Gerarda Cremers	Top 12	
1986	Overijssel	Janny ter Velde	Unplaced	
1985	—	Brigitte Bergman	Unplaced	
1984	North Holland	Nancy Neede	Top 15	
1983	North Holland	Nancy Lalleman-Heijnis	Unplaced	
1982	—	Irene Maria Petronnella Heinrichs Schell	Unplaced	
1981	—	Elena Andreou	Unplaced	
1980	—	Desiree Maria Johanna Nicole Geelen	Unplaced	
1979	—	Nannetje Johanna Nielen	Unplaced	
1978	—	Ans van Haaster	Unplaced	
1977	North Holland	Ineke Berends	1st Runner-up	
1976	—	Stephanie Flatow	5th Runner-up	
1975	—	Barbara Ann Neefs	Unplaced	
1974	—	Gerarda Sophia Balm	Unplaced	
1973	—	Anna Maria Groot	Top 15	
1972	—	Monique Borgeld	Unplaced	
1971	—	Monica Strotmann	Unplaced	
1970	—	Patricia Hollman	Unplaced	
1969	—	Nente van der Vliet	Unplaced	
1968	—	Alida Grootenboer	Unplaced	
1967	—	Monica van Beelen	Unplaced	
1966	—	Anneke Geerts	Unplaced	
1965	—	Janny de Knegt	Unplaced	
1964	—	Renske van den Berg	Unplaced	
1963	—	Hanny Ijsbrants	Unplaced	
1962	North Holland	Catharina Johanna Lodders	Miss World 1962	
1961	—	Ria van Zuiden	Unplaced	
1960	—	Carina Verbeck	Unplaced	
1959	North Holland	Corine Rottschäfer	Miss World 1959	
1958	—	Luciënne Struve	4th Runner-up	
1957	—	Christina van Zijp	Unplaced	
1956	—	Ans van Pothoven	Unplaced	
1955	—	Angelina Kalkhoven	Unplaced	
1954	—	Conny Harteveld	Unplaced	
1953	—	Yvonne Meijer	Unplaced	
1952	—	Sanny Weitner	Unplaced	
1951	—	Margaret van Beer	Unplaced	

== See also ==
- Miss Universe Netherlands
- Miss International Netherlands
