= Miss Grand Suriname =

Surinamese beauty pageant title

- Formation: 2014
- Type: Beauty pageant
- Headquarters: Aalsmeer
- Location: Netherlands
- Members: Miss Grand International
- Official language: Dutch
- National directors: Robin Hoven – Lieuw Choy
- Parent organization: Tropical Beauties Suriname (2014 –2016); 12 Months of Beauty (2018)

Miss Grand Suriname is a national beauty pageant title awarded to Suriname representatives competing at the Miss Grand International contest. From 2014 to 2016 the right to send Surinamese candidates to compete at the mentioned international stage belonged to the national pageant of Miss Tropical Beauties Suriname, which is headed by Gietanjali Thakoer. Miss Grand Suriname title was first awarded in 2014 to the winner of Miss Tropical Beauties Suriname, Tashana Losche, who then competed at Miss Grand International 2014 in Thailand, but was unplaced.

The license of Miss Grand Suriname was purchased by a Netherlands-based pageant organizer, 12 Months of Beauty, in 2018, in which the first runner-up of Miss Grand Netherlands 2018 was assigned Miss Grand Suriname for that year international competition. However, since 2019 no Surinamese candidates competed in the Miss Grand International pageant due to a lack of licensees.

Since the establishment of Miss Grand International, Suriname participated four times; from 2014 to 2018, but all of its representatives were unplaced.

== International competition ==
The following is a list of Surinamese representatives at the Miss Grand International contest.

Year	Representative	Original national title	Competition Performance		National director(s)
Year	Representative	Original national title	Placement	Other awards	National director(s)
2014	Tashana Losche	Miss Tropical Beauties Suriname 2014	Unplaced	—N/a	Gietanjali Thakoer
2015	Svetoisckia Brunswijk	1st runner-up Miss Tropical Beauties Suriname 2015	Unplaced	—N/a	Gietanjali Thakoer
2016	Daryola Brandon	1st runner-up Miss Tropical Beauties Suriname 2016	Unplaced	—N/a	Gietanjali Thakoer
2017	Did not compete				
2018	Safina Barsatie	1st runner-up Miss Grand Netherlands 2018	Unplaced	—N/a	Robin Hoven – Lieuw Choy
No representatives since 2019
