= Miss International Netherlands =

Beauty pageant

Miss International Netherlands Miss Toerisme Benelux
- Formation: 2009
- Type: Beauty pageant
- Headquarters: Amsterdam
- Location: Netherlands
- Members: Miss International
- Official language: Dutch
- National Director: Katia Maes
- Website: missitems.be

The Miss International Netherlands (Known as Miss Nederland International) is a beauty pageant which selects Miss Netherlands to the Miss International pageant.

== History ==
The Netherlands was debuted at the Miss International beauty pageant in 1960 by Miss Holland contest. Along with Holland representatives for Miss Universe and Miss World, Miss Netherlands for Miss International also became the most prestigious title at the Miss Holland contest. In 1961 Miss Holland 1961, Stam van Baer won Miss International 1961 in Long Beach, California, USA. Between 2002 and 2008 the Netherlands did not exist at the pageant.

In 2009 the Netherlands comes from Katia Maes directorship in Miss International history. The winner of Miss International Netherlands may come at the Miss International beauty pageant which mostly happens in Japan. The reigning title is expected to serve as Ambassador of Peace in the Netherlands.

== Titleholders ==
Color key

- Declared as Winner
- Ended as runner-up
- Ended as one of the finalists or semifinalists

Year	Miss International Netherlands	Province	Placement	Special Awards
2009	Roline Hund	North Holland	Unplaced	
2010	Jorien van der Harst	North Holland	Unplaced	
2011	Talitha Esra Hertsenberg	North Holland	Top 15	
2013	Nathalie den Dekker	North Holland	1st Runner-up	
2014	Shauny Bult	North Brabant	Unplaced	
2015	Rachel Van Der Meulen	Overijssel	Unplaced	
2016	Melissa Scherpen	Drenthe	Unplaced	Miss International Europe
2017	Nathalie Mogbelzada	North Holland	Unplaced	
2018	Zoë Niewold	Drenthe	Unplaced	Miss International Europe
2019	Elize Joanne de Jong	South Holland	Top 15	Miss International Europe
2020	Due to the impact of COVID-19 pandemic, no pageant in 2020			
2021	Due to the impact of COVID-19 pandemic, no pageant in 2021			
2023	Morgan Doelwijt	Utrecht	Unplaced	
2024	Christina Lazaros	North Holland	Unplaced	
2025	Serena Darder	North Holland	Top 20	
2026	Isabel Soleil	North Holland	TBA	

- Nathalie den Dekker placed Top 15 Miss World 2012 in China.
- Shauny Bult placed Top 20 Miss Grand International 2015 in Thailand.

=== Miss Nederland/Miss Universe Nederland 1994-2001 ===
Year	Miss Netherlands	Placement at Miss International	Special Awards	Placement at Miss Nederland
1994	Sabine te Vrede	Top 15		1st Runner-up
1995	Nathalie van den Dungen	Unplaced		2nd Runner-up
1996	Leoni Boon	Unplaced		1st Runner-up
1998	Ilona Marilyn van Veldhuisen	Unplaced		
2001	Caroline Heijboer	Unplaced		

=== Miss Holland 1960-1993 ===
Year	Miss Netherlands	Placement at Miss International	Special Awards	Placement at Miss Holland
1960	Katinka Bleeker	Unplaced		1st Runner-up
1961	Stam van Baer	Miss International 1961	Miss Photogenic	2nd Runner-up
1962	Johanna Lodders	3rd Runner-up		Miss Holland 1962
1963	Hanny IJsebrands	Unplaced		3rd Runner-up
1964	Renske van den Berg	Unplaced		2nd Runner-up
1965	Elaine Bollen	Top 15		1st Runner-up
1967	Sandrina van Senus	Unplaced		1st Runner-up (1966)
1968	Cecile van der Lelie	Unplaced		3rd Runner-up
1969	Maria Lingen	Unplaced		3rd Runner-up
1970	Marjolein Abbing	Unplaced		Miss Holland 1968
1971	Ans Krupp	Unplaced		3rd Runner-up
1972	Monica Strottman	Unplaced		1st Runner-up
1973	Yildiz de Kat	Unplaced		Miss Holland 1973
1974	Nanna Beetstra	Unplaced	Best National Costume	3rd Runner-up
1975	Nannetje Johanna Nielen	Top 15		2nd Runner-up
1976	Cornelia Yvonne Kitsz	Unplaced		1st Runner-up (1975)
1977	Willie Muis	Unplaced		1st Runner-up
1978	Karin Ingrid Gustafsson	Unplaced		Miss Holland 1978
1979	Mary Kruyssen	Unplaced		3rd Runner-up
1980	Jacqueline Boertien	Unplaced		3rd Runner-up
1981	Ine Hoedemaeckers	Unplaced		2nd Runner-up
1982	Jacqueline Schuman	Unplaced		
1983	Brigitte Bergman	Top 15		1st Runner-up
1984	Rosalie van Breemen	Unplaced		1st Runner-up
1985	Jacqueline Schuman	2nd Runner-up		***
1986	Caroline Veldkamp	Top 15		2nd Runner-up
1987	Angelique Johanna Cremers	Unplaced		Miss Holland 1987
1988	Ellis Adriaensen	Unplaced		2nd Runner-up (1987)
1989	Ghislaine Niewold	Top 15		5th Runner-up (1988)
1990	Esther den Otter	Unplaced		4th Runner-up (1989)
1991	Marjanne Kraaijeveld	Unplaced		
1992	Linda Grandia	Unplaced		Miss Holland 1992
1993	Shirley Antoinette Bogaard	Unplaced		

- (***) Jacqueline Schuman (Miss Holland Contestant 1982) competed in 1982 and 1985 Miss International pageant in unknown reasons.

== See also ==
- Miss Nederland
