= Miss Grand Netherlands 2017 =

2nd Miss Grand Netherlands competition, beauty pageant edition

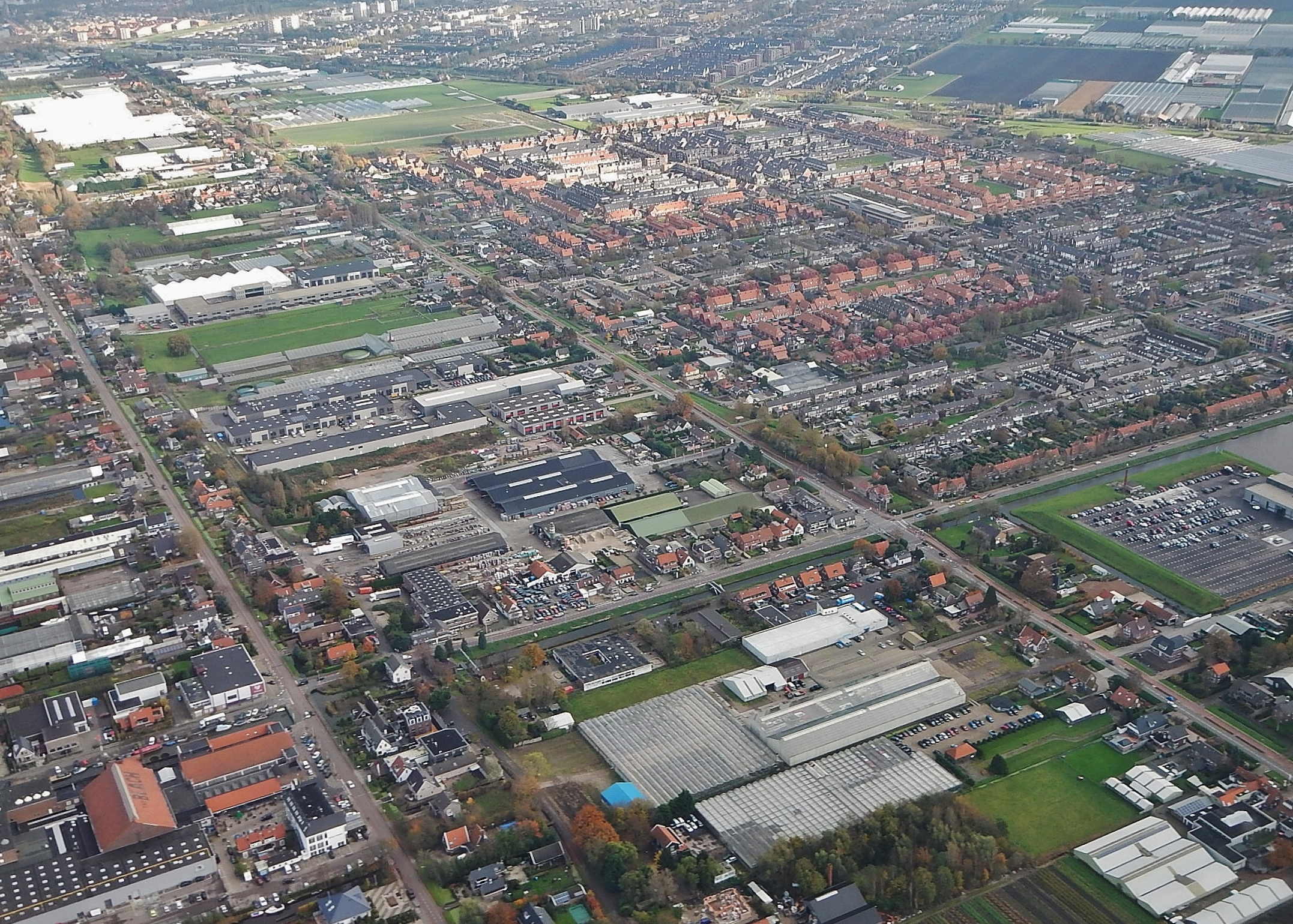
- Aalsmeer, the host city of the contest
- Date: March 25, 2017
- Presenters: Leila Aigbedion
- Venue: Crown Theatre, Aalsmeer
- Broadcaster: YouTube
- Entrants: 7
- Placements: 4
- Winner: Kelly van den Dungen (North Brabant)
- Photogenic: Kelly van den Dungen (North Brabant)

Miss Grand Netherlands 2017 was the second edition of the Miss Grand Netherlands beauty pageant, held at the Crown Theatre in Aalsmeer, Netherlands, on March 25, 2017. Seven candidates who qualified through the casting process held earlier in January competed for the title, and a twenty-three-year-old communication and multimedia designer from North Brabant, Kelly van den Dungen, was named the winner. Kelly then represented the country at the Miss Grand International 2017 pageant in Phú Quốc, Vietnam, where she was placed among the top 20 finalists.

In addition to the mentioned winner, the country representative for the Miss Supranational 2017 pageant, Jeanine de Vries, was announced as well.

The grand final competition was hosted by a Nigerian/Liberian beauty queen, Leila Aigbedion, and was expected to be attended by Ariska Putri Pertiwi, Miss Grand International 2016, from Indonesia, but was later canceled due to visa problems.

== Result ==
Position	Candidate
Miss Grand Netherlands 2017	North Brabant – Kelly van den Dungen
Miss Supranational Netherlands 2017	South Holland – Jeanine de Vries
1st runner-up	Drenthe – Bente Vrieling
2nd runner-up	Overijssel – Laura Ghobrial
Special awards
Miss Grand Photo	North Brabant – Kelly van den Dungen
Miss Grand Model	Gelderland – Melissa Oeges

== Candidates ==
Seven candidates competed for the title of Miss Grand Netherlands 2017.

- Drenthe – Bente Vrieling
- Friesland – Ingrid de Boer
- Gelderland – Melissa Oeges
- Groningen – Christina Lazaros
- Limburg – Robin Engels (Withdrew)
- North Brabant – Kelly van den Dungen
- Overijssel – Laura Ghobrial
- South Holland – Jeanine de Vries
