= Andrea Stelzer =

- Born: 1965 (age 59–60); South Africa
- Occupations: Model; Beauty pageant contestant; Film actor

Andrea Stelzer (born c. 1965) is a South African-German model and beauty pageant titleholder who represented Germany in the Miss Universe 1989. In 1985, Stelzer was Miss South Africa and slated to be a delegate to the 1985 Miss Universe pageant but, due to anti-apartheid demonstrations, was forced to withdraw from the competition. In 1989, she was Germany's representative to Miss Universe 1989, where she placed in the semi-finals.

In her honour, a rose variety was named "Andrea Stelzer".
