= Miss Grand Netherlands =

National beauty pageant in Netherlands

- Established: 5 June 2016; 10 years ago
- Founder: Robin & Stefan Hoven – Lieuw Choy
- Type: Beauty pageant
- Headquarters: Amsterdam
- Location: Netherlands
- Members: Miss Grand International
- Official language: Dutch and English
- President: Robin Hoven – Lieuw Choy
- Parent organization: 12 Months of Beauty (2013 – Present)
- Website: 12MonthsOfBeauty.nl

Miss Grand Netherlands is a Dutch female national beauty pageant, founded in 2016 by an Amsterdam-based pageant organizer, Robin & Stefan Hoven – Lieuw Choy. The winner of the contest represented the country in its international parent contest, Miss Grand International.

Occasionally, the Miss Grand Netherlands titleholders were determined through other national pageants, such as Miss Supranational Netherlands in 2013–2014, and Miss 12 Months of Beauty in 2020 and 2022.

Since their debut in 2013, Netherlands' representatives have not won the Miss Grand International title but hold a record of 5 placements in such a title; the highest position is the fifth runner-up, obtained by Melissa Bottema in 2023.

== History ==
The Netherlands has always been conducting the national contest to determine its representatives for the Miss Grand International pageant since 2013, except for 2015, 2019 and 2021, when the titleholders were assigned to the position. However, the contest was only held under the title of Miss Grand Netherlands in 2016, 2017, and 2023, the remaining representatives were determined through either the Miss Supranational Netherlands pageant or the Miss & Mr 12 Months of Beauty pageant.

The Miss Grand Netherlands beauty pageant comes under the franchise of 12 Months of Beauty, which is run by Robin and Stefan Hoven – Lieuw Choy, the national directors. Their first placement at Miss Grand International is top 20 finalists in 2013, won by Talisa Wolters who obtained the Miss Grand national title after participating in Miss Grand & Supranational Netherlands 2013 contest. The Netherlands representatives also got the same placement in 2015, 2017 and 2021.

== Editions ==
=== Location and date ===
Edition	Date	Final venue	Entrants	Ref.
1st	5 June 2016	Aalsmeer Studios, Aalsmeer	4	
2nd	26 March 2017	Crown Theatre, Aalsmeer	7	
3rd	17 June 2018	Apollo Hotel, Vinkeveen	10	
4th	4 June 2023	Claus Event Center, Hoofddorp	11	
5th	21 July 2024	Vinkeveen Event Centre, Vinkeveen	14	
6th	15 June 2025	Cpunt Cultural Center, Hoofddorp	14	
7th	12 July 2026	Cpunt Cultural Center, Hoofddorp	9	

=== Competition result ===
Edition	Winner	Runners-up			
Edition	Winner	First	Second	Third	Fourth
1st	Floor Masselink (Groningen)	Not awarded			
2nd	Kelly van den Dungen (North Brabant)	Bente Vrieling (Drenthe)	Laura Ghobrial (Overijssel)	Not awarded	
3rd	Kimberley Xhofleer (North Brabant)	Safina Barsatie (South Holland)	Esmeralda Carelse (Limburg)	Not awarded	
4th	Melissa Tjemma Bottema (Groningen)	Amber Tamara Rustenberg (Flevoland)	Merel Bakker (Gelderland)	Bo Grooten (Drenthe)	Merel van Roon (South Holland)
5th	Ashley Brown (North Holland)	Josephine Onderdonck (North Brabant)	Niamh Werkhoven (Groningen)	Katiana Loukisas (Zeeland)	Michelle van der Stoep (Flevoland)
6th	Rosalie Esmee Hooft (Gelderland)	Kim Hulshof (Gelderland)	Yentl Felter (Utrecht)	Michelle van der Stoep (Flevoland)	Nica Ella (Almere)
7th	Beau Megan Goos (Groningen)	Mônica Daniëlle Fernandes (Flevoland)	Luna Bleyenberg (Zeeland)	Silke Kloostermann (Overijssel)	Serena Ramautar (Friesland)

== International Competition ==
The following is a list of Dutch representatives who competed at the Miss Grand International pageant.

Color keys

- : Declared as the winner
- : Ended as a runner-up (Top 5)
- : Ended as a finalist (Top 10)
- : Ended as a semifinalist (Top 20/21)
- : Ended as special awards winner

Year	Province	Miss Grand Netherlands	National Title	Placement	Special Awards	National Director
2026	Groningen	Beau Megan Goos	Miss Grand Netherlands 2026	2nd Runner-up		Robin Hoven; Lieuw Choy
2025	Gelderland	Rosalie Esmee Hooft	Miss Grand Netherlands 2025	Unplaced		Robin Hoven; Lieuw Choy
2024	North Holland	Ashley Brown	Miss Grand Netherlands 2024	Unplaced		Robin Hoven; Lieuw Choy
2023	Groningen	Melissa Bottema	Miss Grand Netherlands 2023	5th Runner Up		Robin Hoven; Lieuw Choy
2022	North Holland	Marit Beets	Miss & Mr. 12 Months of Beauty 2022 (Note: Main title of Miss & Mr. 12 Months of Beauty 2022 pageant.)	Unplaced		Robin Hoven; Lieuw Choy
2021	North Holland	Nathalie Yasmin	Appointed	Top 20		Robin Hoven; Lieuw Choy
2020	North Brabant	Suzan Lips	Miss & Mr. 12 Months of Beauty 2020 (Note: Main title of Miss & Mr. 12 Months of Beauty 2020 online pageant.)	Unplaced		Robin Hoven; Lieuw Choy
2019	Friesland	Margaretha de Jong	Appointed	Unplaced		Robin Hoven; Lieuw Choy
2018	North Brabant	Kimberley Xhofleer	Miss Grand Netherlands 2018	Unplaced		Robin Hoven; Lieuw Choy
2017	North Brabant	Kelly van den Dungen	Miss Grand Netherlands 2017	Top 20		Robin Hoven; Lieuw Choy
2016	Groningen	Floor Masselink	Miss Grand Netherlands 2016	Unplaced		Robin Hoven; Lieuw Choy
2015	North Brabant	Shauny Built	Appointed	Top 20		Robin Hoven; Lieuw Choy
2014	Overijssel	Francis Everduim	Miss Grand Netherlands 2013 (Note: Supplementary title at Miss Supranational Netherlands 2014 pageant.)	Unplaced		Robin Hoven; Lieuw Choy
2013	Limburg	Talisa Wolters	Miss Grand Netherlands 2013 (Note: Supplementary title at Miss Supranational Netherlands 2013 pageant.)	Top 20		Robin Hoven; Lieuw Choy

== Gallery ==
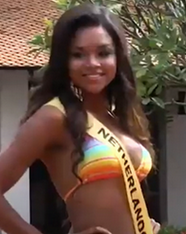
Miss Grand Netherlands 2014
Francis Everduim

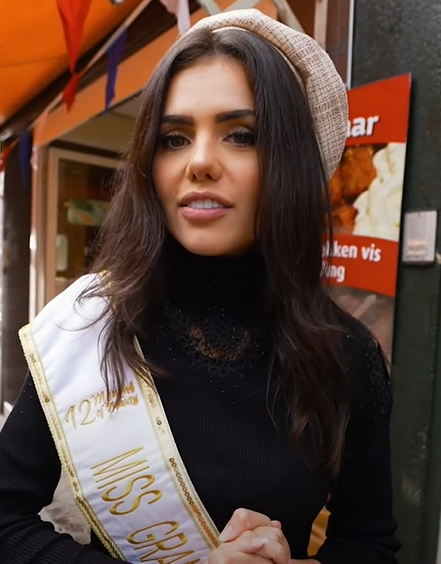
Miss Grand Netherlands 2021
Nathalie Mogbelzada

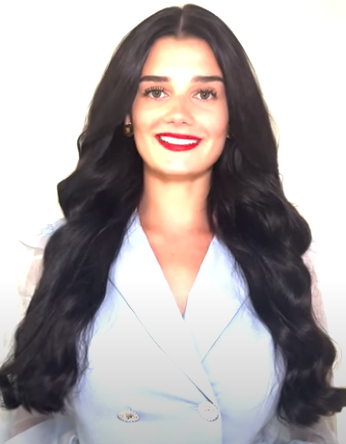
Miss Grand Netherlands 2023
Melissa Bottema

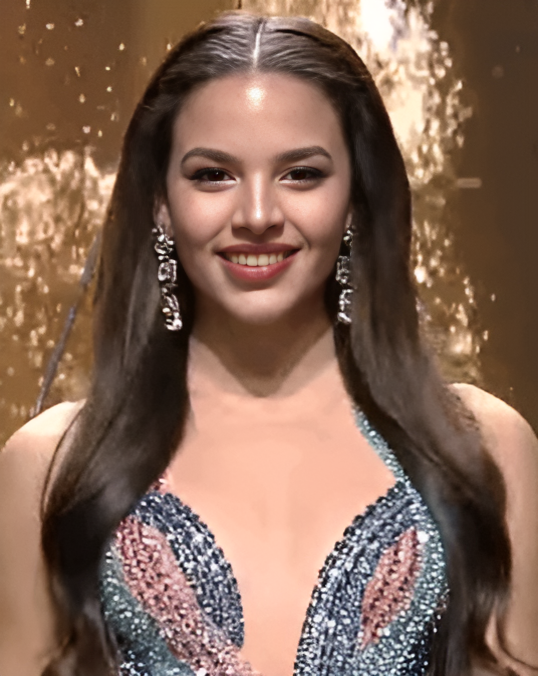
Miss Grand Netherlands 2024
Ashley Brown

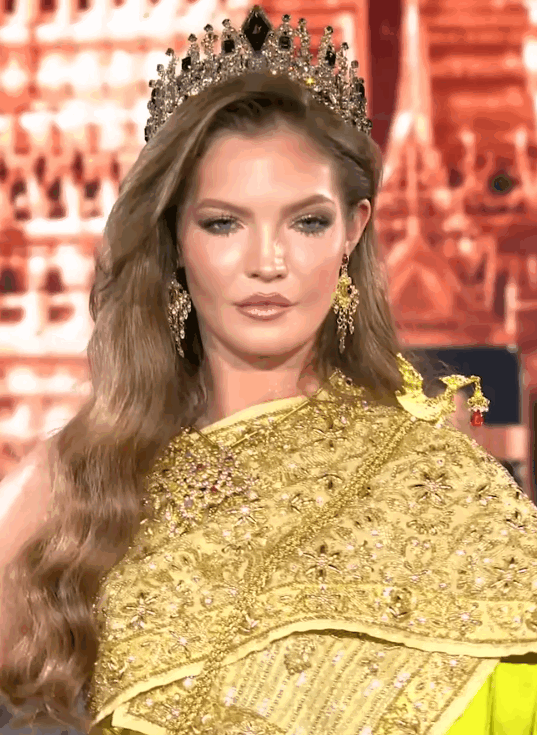
Miss Grand Netherlands 2025
Rosalie Esmee Hooft

== National finalists ==
The following list is the national finalists of the Miss Grand Netherlands pageant, as well as the competition results.

Year Represented	1st	2nd	3rd	4th	5th	6th
Almere						Y
Amersfoort						Y
Bernheze					Y	
Den Bosch						Y
Drenthe			Y		Y	Y
Flevoland			Y			Y
Friesland	Y	Y	Y	Y	Y	Y
Gelderland		Y	Y		Y	Y
Groningen		Y	Y			Y
Haarlem					Y	
Heerlen					Y	
Krimpen aan den IJssel					Y	
Limburg		Y		Y	Y	
North Brabant	Y			Y		Y
North Holland			Y	Y		Y
Overijssel	Y		Y	Y	Y	Y
South Holland		S			Y	
Utrecht			Y	Y	Y	Y
Utrecht City						Y
Zeeland			Y	Y		Y
Total	4	7	10	11	14	14
Color keys: : Declared as the winner; : Ended as a 1st runner-up; : Ended as a 2nd runner-up; : Ended as a 3rd runner-up; : Ended as a 4th runner-up; A : Ended as a finalist, semifinalist and unplaced; S : Ended as a Miss Supranational Netherlands; × : Ended as withdrew during the competition; × : Ended as no representative
