= Miss Europe 1964 =

International beauty pageant

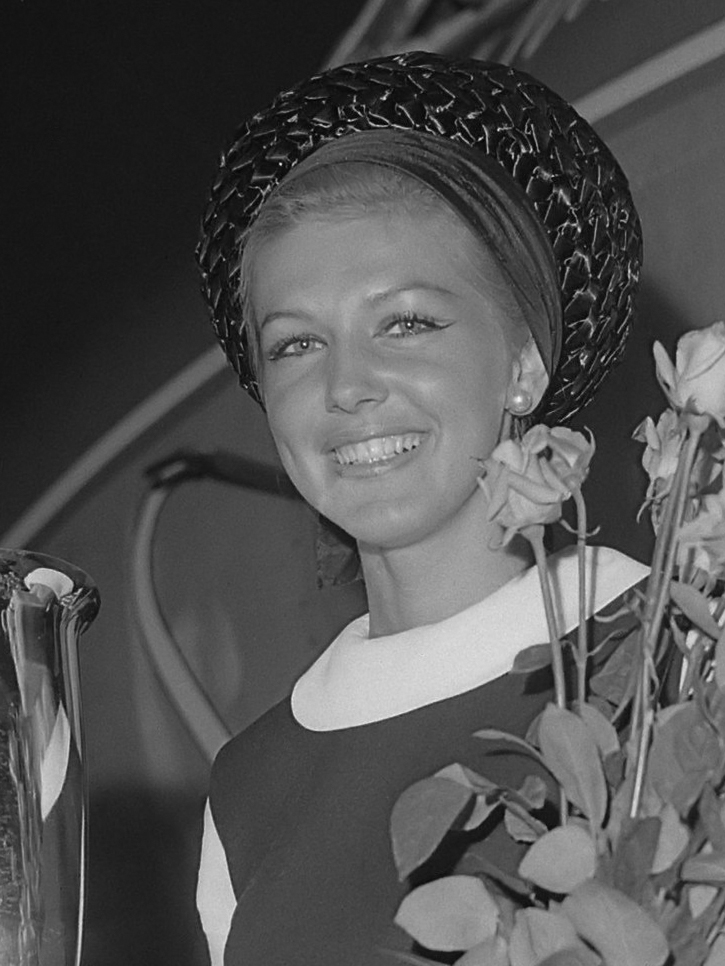
- Miss Europe 1964, Elly Konie Koot
- Date: 4 June 1964
- Venue: Casino du Liban, Beirut, Lebanon
- Entrants: 17
- Placements: 10
- Withdrawals: Portugal & Turkey
- Returns: Ireland
- Winner: Elly Konie Koot (Netherlands) Holland

Miss Europe 1964 was the 27th edition of the Miss Europe pageant and the 16th edition under the Mondial Events Organization. It was held at the Casino du Liban in Beirut, Lebanon on 4 June 1964. Elly Konie Koot of Holland was crowned Miss Europe 1964 by outgoing titleholder Mette Stenstad of Norway.

== Background ==
=== Selection of participants ===
Contestants representing seventeen countries were chosen to participate in the pageant. One candidate was appointed to represent her country to replace the original dethroned winner.

==== Replacements ====
Miss Luxembourg 1964, Gaby Heyard, was set to compete in the pageant, but was replaced by Miss Elegance Mariette Stephano for undisclosed reasons.

==== Debuts, returns, and withdrawals ====
This edition saw the return of Ireland, which last competed in 1956, while Portugal and Turkey withdrew after their respective organizations failed to hold a national competition or appoint a delegate.

== Results ==
=== Placements ===
Final results	Contestant
Miss Europe 1964	(Netherlands) Holland – Elly Konie Koot
1st runner-up	(West Germany) Germany – Marion Sibylle Zota
2nd runner-up	Sweden – Siv Märta Åberg
3rd runner-up	France – Edith Noël
4th runner-up	Spain – Rosa María Ruiz
Top 10	Finland – Sirpa Suosmaa; Norway – Jorunn Nystedt

== Contestants ==
- Austria – Rosita Nowak
- Belgium – Danièle Defrère
- Denmark – Winnie Beck
- England – Brenda Blackler
- Finland – Sirpa Suosmaa
- France – Edith Noël
- Germany – Marion Sibylle Zota
- Greece – Kia Limperi
- Holland – Elly Konie Koot
- Iceland – Sonja Egilsdóttir
- Ireland – Joan Power
- Italy – María Luisa "Marilù" Perini
- Luxembourg – Mariette-Sophie Stephano
- Norway – Jorunn Nystedt
- Spain – Rosa María Ruiz
- Sweden – Siv Märta Åberg
- Switzerland – Sandra Sulser (Sulzer)

== Notes ==
=== Returns ===
- Ireland

=== Withdrawals ===
- Portugal
- Turkey
