= Miss Grand Netherlands 2023 =

4th Miss Grand Netherlands competition, beauty pageant edition

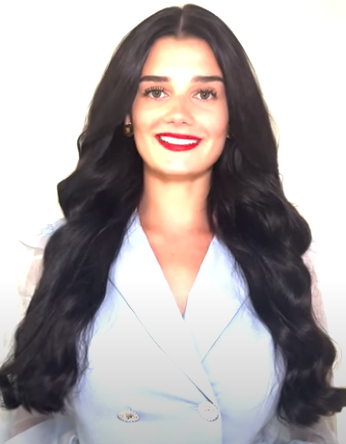
- Melissa Bottema, the winner of the contest
- Date: 4 June 2023
- Presenters: Marit Beets
- Venue: Claus Event Center, Hoofddorp
- Broadcaster: Facebook
- Entrants: 11
- Placements: 5
- Winner: Melissa Bottema (Groningen)
- Photogenic: Merel Bakker (Gelderland)

Miss Grand Netherlands 2023 competition result by province
| Winner | Fourth runner-up |
| First runner-up | Unplaced |
| Second runner-up | Withdrew |
| Third runner-up | No representative |

Miss Grand Netherlands 2023 was the fourth edition of the Miss Grand Netherlands beauty pageant, held on June 4, 2023, at the Claus Event Center in the city of Hoofddorp. Eleven candidates, who qualified for the national stage through an audion held in February and then were assigned to represents one of the country's provinces, competed for the title.

At the end of the event, the representative of Groningen, Melissa Bottema, was announced the winner, outclassing the other ten finalists. Meanwhile, Amber Tamara of Flevoland and Merel Bakker of Gelderland were named the first and second runners-up, respectively. Bottema was crowned by Miss Grand Netherlands 2022, Marit Beets, and obtained the right to represent the country at the Miss Grand International 2023 pageant, to be held in Vietnam on October 25.

== Result ==
| Position | Candidate |
|---|---|
| Miss Grand Netherlands 2023 | Groningen – Melissa Bottema |
| 1st runners-up | Flevoland – Amber Tamara Rustenberg |
| 2nd runners-up | Gelderland – Merel Bakker |
| 3rd runners-up | Drenthe – Bo Grooten |
| 4th runners-up | South Holland – Merel van Roon |
Special Awards
| Miss BaroQco | Groningen – Melissa Bottema |
| Miss Fit and Shape | Flevoland – Amber Tamara Rustenberg |
| Miss Photogenic | Gelderland – Merel Bakker |
| Miss Social Media | Flevoland – Amber Tamara Rustenberg |

== Candidates ==
Originally, 12 candidates were confirmed to participate, of whom, the representative of Zeeland, Rebecca Zuidweg, withdrew for personal reasons, making the finalized total of 11 contestants.

- Drenthe – Bo Grooten
- Flevoland – Amber Tamara Rustenberg
- Friesland – Esmee van der Meulen
- Gelderland – Merel Bakker
- Groningen – Melissa Bottema
- Limburg – Yarah Mookhram
- North Brabant – Carmen Kara
- North Holland – Tene Donzo
- Overijssel – Robin Danique Mulder
- South Holland – Merel van Roon
- Utrecht – Chimène Colijn
- Zeeland – Rebecca Zuidweg (Withdrew)
