= Rikkie Kollé =

Dutch model

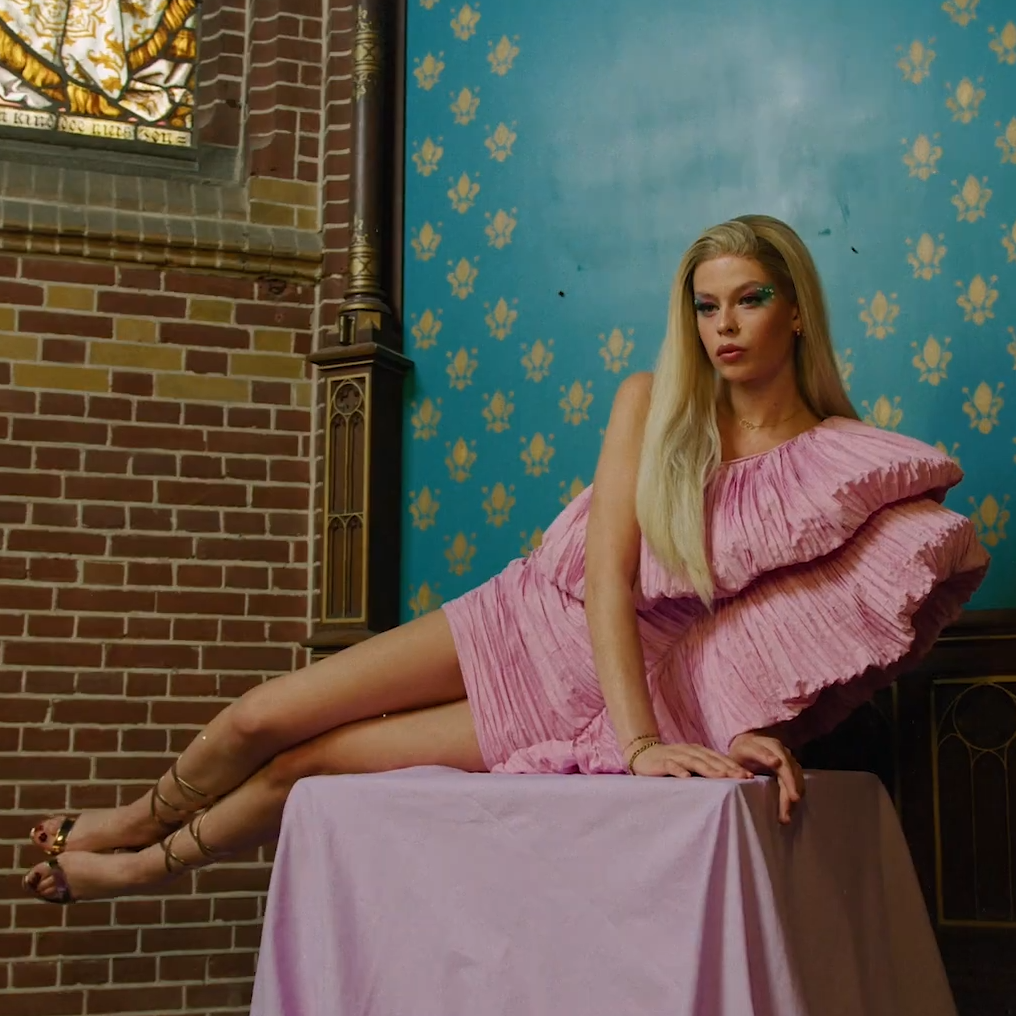
- Kollé in 2022
- Born: 6 April 2001 (age 25); Hoorn, Netherlands
- Occupation: Model
- Beauty pageant titleholder
- Title: Miss Nederland 2023
- Major competitions: Miss Nederland 2023 (Winner); Miss Universe 2023

Rikkie Valerie Kollé (born 6 April 2001) is a Dutch model and beauty pageant titleholder who was crowned Miss Nederland 2023 and represented her country at Miss Universe 2023. Kollé was the first transgender woman to win the Miss Nederland title, and was only the second ever transgender woman to enter the Miss Universe contest.

== Career ==
Kollé began modelling on Holland's Next Top Model (season 11). In 2019, Kollé reached the final of the Elite Model Look contest in the Netherlands.

In 2023, Kollé participated in the Miss Netherlands pageant. She was selected as one of the finalists and ultimately won the title, becoming the first transgender woman to win Miss Netherlands. During her participation in the competition, she spoke about her desire to dedicate herself to addressing the long waiting lists in transgender care in the Netherlands.

In 2024, Kollé was one of the participants in the 24th season of the RTL 4 program Expeditie Robinson. She was the fourth to be eliminated, finishing in seventeenth place. In 2025, she participated in the television program The Floor VIPS. Kollé also took part in De kwis met ballen that year.

== Personal life ==
Kollé was born 6 April 2001, in Hoorn, Netherlands. She is of Indo-Dutch descent, and is a transgender woman.

Awards and achievements
Preceded by Ona Moody	Miss Nederland; 2023	Succeeded by Amber Rustenburg
Preceded by Ona Moody	Miss Universe Netherlands; 2023	Succeeded by Faith Landman
