= Melissa Bottema =

Dutch beauty pageant titleholder

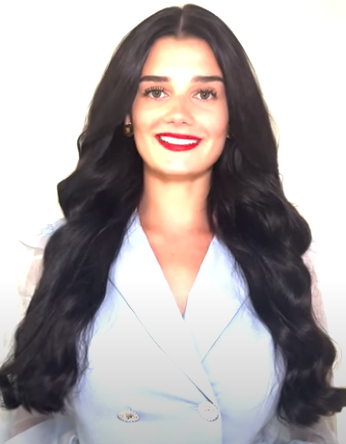
- Bottema in 2023
- Born: Melissa Tjemma Janneke Bottema; April 9, 2000 (age 26); Zandeweer, Groningen, Netherlands
- Height: 1.76 m (5 ft 9 1/2 in)
- Beauty pageant titleholder
- Title: Miss Intercontinental Netherlands 2022; Miss Grand Netherlahds 2023; Miss Nederland 2026; Miss Universe Netherlands 2026
- Hair colour: Dark brown
- Eye colour: Hazel
- Major competitions: Miss Intercontinental 2022; (Top 20); Miss Grand Netherlands 2023; (Winner); Miss Grand International 2023; (5th Runner-Up); Miss Nederland 2026; (Winner); Miss Universe 2026; (TBD)

Melissa Tjemma Janneke Bottema (born 9 April 2000) is a Dutch beauty pageant titleholder who won Miss Nederland 2026. She will represent the Netherlands at the Miss Universe 2026 competition.

== Early life and career ==
Bottema was born on April 10, 2000, and raised in Winsum, a former municipality in the province of Groningen, Netherlands. She pursued higher education at, majoring in social work, and successfully obtained her professional degree.

== Pageantry ==
=== Miss Intercontinental 2022 ===
Bottema represented the Netherlands at the Miss Intercontinental 2022 pageant held in Egypt and finished in the Top 20.

=== Miss Grand Netherlands 2023 ===
On June 4, 2023, she represented the province of Groningen in the Miss Grand Netherlands 2023 pageant held at the Claus Event Center in Hoofddorp. She emerged as the overall winner, surpassing ten other finalists.

=== Miss Grand International 2023 ===
Bottema represented the Netherlands at the Miss Grand International 2023 pageant was held in Vietnam. She advanced to the finals and placed in the Top 10 as the fifth runner-up.

=== Miss Nederland 2026 ===
Bottema competed in the Miss Nederland 2026 pageant, as Miss Groningen. At the conclusion of the event, she won the title and was crowned by her predecessor, Nathalie Mogbelzada.

=== Miss Universe 2026 ===
As the national titleholder, Bottema received the right to represent the Netherlands at the Miss Universe 2026 pageant, scheduled to take place in San Juan, Puerto Rico.

Awards and achievements
Preceded by (North Holland) Nathalie Mogbelzada	Miss Universe Netherlands; 2026	Incumbent
Preceded by (North Holland) Marit Beets	Miss Grand Netherlands; 2023	Succeeded by (North Holland) Ashley Brown
Preceded by (Friesland) Suzette van der Pol	Miss Intercontinental Netherlands; 2022	Succeeded by (Drenthe) Kim Hulshof
