= Miss Grand Netherlands 2025 =

6th Miss Grand Netherlands competition

- Date: 15 June 2025
- Venue: C punt in Hoofddorp, Hoofddorp
- Broadcaster: YouTube
- Entrants: 14
- Debuts: Almere; Amersfoort; Den Bosch; Utrecht City
- Withdrawals: Bernheze; Haarlem; Heerlen; Krimpen aan den IJssel; Limburg; South Holland
- Returns: Utrecht; Overijssel

Miss Grand Netherlands 2025 was the 13thMiss Grand Netherlands pageant, by 12 Months of Beauty. The final was held on June 15, 2025, at C punt in Hoofddorp, Hoofddorp. In the end eleven contestants competed for the title.

At the end of the event, Ashley Brown of North Holland will crown her successor who will then represent the Netherlands at the international parent stage, Miss Grand International 2025.

Miss Grand Netherlands 2025 is Rosalie Esmee Hooft, who was Miss Grand Gelderland. She will represent the Netherlands at Miss Grand International 2025 in Thailand in October.

https://www.youtube.com/live/_OFrT5-FPWk?si=75AQbTSPlljo7vge

== Contestants ==
Fourteen contestants have been confirmed.

Represented	Contestant	Age (Note: Ages at the time of the pageant)
Almere	Mônica Fernandes de Freitas	25
Amersfoort	Philine Meinema	24
Den Bosch	Mandy Beekwilder	28
Drenthe	Noa Londeman	20
Flevoland	Michelle van der Stoep	24
Friesland	Isabelle Schoutsen	27
Gelderland	Rosalie Hooft	24
Groningen	Kim Hulshof	25
Noord Brabant	Zee Kinga	22
Noord Holland	Cristina Isabel	24
Overijssel	Jet Wigger	19
Utrecht	Yentl Felter	22
Utrecht City	Tanisha Giskus	25
Zeeland	Fay Wolffensperger	27
