= Miss Grand Netherlands 2024 =

5th Miss Grand Netherlands competition

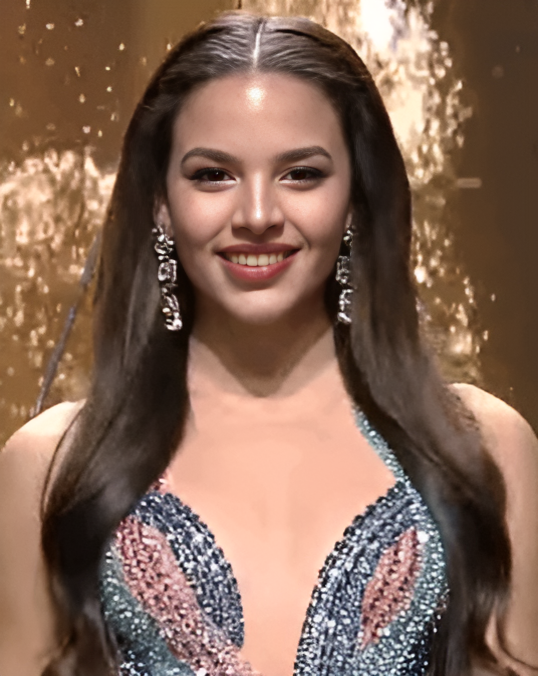
- Ashley Brown, the winner of the contest
- Date: July 21, 2024
- Presenters: Marit Beets
- Entertainment: Jermaine Fleur
- Venue: Vinkeveen Event Centre, Vinkeveen
- Broadcaster: Facebook
- Entrants: 14
- Placements: 5
- Debuts: Bernheze; Haarlem; Heerlen; Krimpen aan den IJssel
- Withdrawals: Overijssel; Utrecht
- Returns: Zeeland
- Winner: Ashley Brown (North Holland)

External videos
- Grand Final Competition

Miss Grand Netherlands 2024 competition result by province
Winner	Third runner-up
First runner-up	Fourth runner-up
Second runner-up	Unplaced
Withdrew

Miss Grand Netherlands 2024 was the 5th edition of the Miss Grand Netherlands pageant, held on July 21, 2024, at the Vinkeveen Event Centre, Vinkeveen. Contestants from 14 provinces and cities competed for the title. Of whom, a 20-year-old singer and songwriter representing North Holland, Ashley Brown, was announced the winner and was crowned by the outgoing Miss Grand Netherlands 2023, Melissa Bottema. Ashleyrepresented the Netherlands at Miss Grand International 2024, held in Thailand on October 25, 2024, but was unplaced.

The event was hosted by Miss Grand Netherlands 2022, Marit Beets, and featured a live performance by a singer, Jermaine Fleur.

== Result ==
Placement	Contestant
Miss Grand Netherlands 2024	North Holland – Ashley Brown
1st runner-up	North Brabant – Josephine Onderdonck
2nd runner-up	Groningen – Niamh Werkhoven
3rd runner-up	Zeeland – Katiana Loukisas
4th runner-up	Flevoland – Michelle van der Stoep
Special awards
Miss BaroQco	Limburg – Isabella Boels
Miss Body 2LAST	North Holland – Ashley Brown
Miss Beauty Icon	North Holland – Ashley Brown
Miss Era Tua	Zeeland – Katiana Loukisas
Miss Grand Voice	North Holland – Ashley Brown

== Judges ==
The panel of judges in the grand final round included:

- Robin Lieuw Choy – Pageant director
- Imelda Liem – Representative of BaroQco
- Avalon Chanel – Miss Nederland 2009,
- Johnny Ten Have – Photographer
- Jermaine Fleur – Singer
- Brian Blijd – Representative of Body2Last
- Suzan Lips – Miss Grand Netherlands 2020
- Melissa Bottema – Miss Grand Netherlands 2023

== Contestants ==
Initially, sixteen contestants have been confirmed, but two withdrew, as detailed below.

- Bernheze – Esmee Rog
- Drenthe – Els Bühler
- Flevoland – Michelle van der Stoep
- Friesland – Jennifer Dijkstra
- Gelderland – Amanda van Wezel
- Groningen – Niamh Werkhoven
- Haarlem – Sophia Weisz
- Heerlen – Tio Hofhuizen
- Krimpen aan den IJssel – Melissa van Zuidam
- Limburg – Isabella Boels
- North Brabant – Josephine Onderdonck
- North Holland – Ashley Brown
- South Holland – Indi Snel
- Zeeland – Katiana Loukisas

Withdrawn contestants

- Overijssel – Ashley de Boer
- Utrecht – Jessy de Jong
