= Miss Grand Netherlands 2016 =

1st Miss Grand Netherlands competition, beauty pageant edition

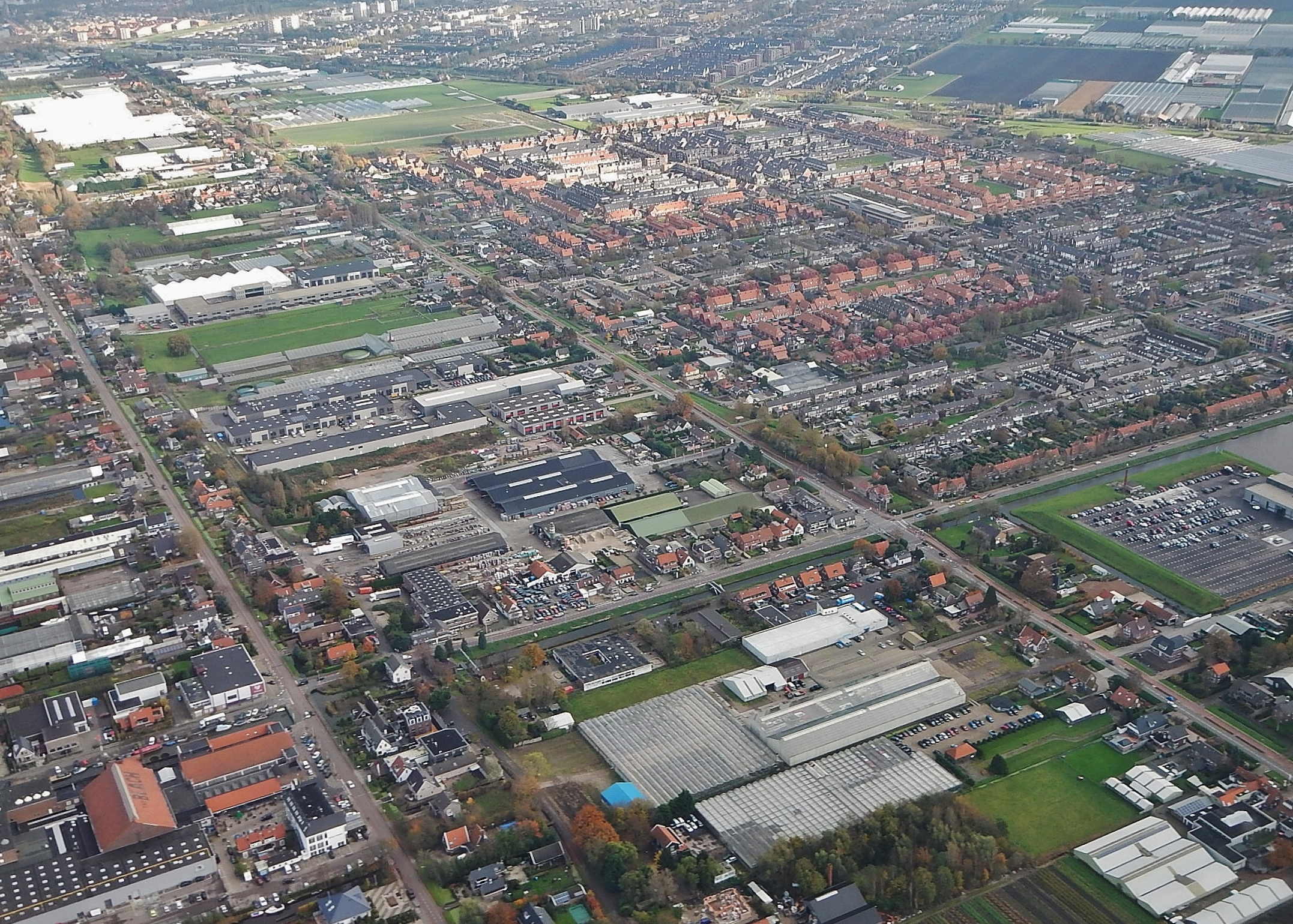
- Aalsmeer, the host city of the contest
- Date: June 5, 2016
- Venue: Aalsmeer Studios, Aalsmeer
- Broadcaster: YouTube
- Entrants: 4
- Placements: 1
- Winner: Floor Masselink (Groningen)

Miss Grand Netherlands 2016 was the inaugural edition of the Miss Grand Netherlands beauty pageant, held at the Aalsmeer Studios in Aalsmeer, Netherlands, on July 5, 2016. Four candidates who qualified through the casting process held earlier in April competed for the title, and a twenty-one-year-old communication and multimedia designer from Groningen, Floor Masselink, was named the winner; no runners-up were declared. Masselink then represented the country at the Miss Grand International 2016 pageant in Las Vegas, United States, but was unplaced.

The panel of juries included – Shauny Bult, Francis Everduim, Leila Aigbedion, and Eduardo Liem.

== Candidates ==
Four candidates competed for the title of Miss Grand Netherlands 2016.

- Friesland – Stephanie Omogun
- Groningen – Floor Masselink (Winner)
- North Brabant – Mellisa Rizos
- Overijssel – Leonie van Gaveren
