= Sara Jane Paez =

Filipina beauty queen (1968–2026)

- Born: February 12, 1968
- Died: January 13, 2026 (aged 57)
- Spouse: Nicky Santiago
- Children: 2
- Beauty pageant titleholder
- Title: Binibining Pilipinas Universe 1989
- Major competition: Miss Universe 1989; Binibining Pilipinas Universe 1989

Sara Jane Paez-Santiago (February 12, 1968 – January 13, 2026) was a Filipino beauty queen who represented the Philippines at the Miss Universe 1989.

== Early life and education ==
Sara Jane Paez was born on February 12, 1968. She graduated from the University of the Philippines Diliman with a speech communications degree. While attending UP, Paez dated basketball player Benjie Paras.

== Career ==
Still a college student at UP, Sara Jane Paez won the Binibining Pilipinas Universe 1989 title. Her then-boyfriend Paras, advised her not to not get too involved in showbiz. Paez rejected an offer to co-host APO TV reasoning she cannot sing even allegedly the producers suggest she could get away by lip-syncing.

Known for her fluency in Spanish, Paez represented the Philippines at the Miss Universe 1989 beauty pageant in Cancun, Mexico.

During and after her career as a beauty queen, Paez guested in various national events and fashion shows. She also became a commercial model, and was part of Batch 3 of the Professional Models Association of the Philippines (PMAP).

Paez also appeared in television outside of beauty pageants, last appearing in January 2024 in the game show Family Feud along with her husband, sister, and brother-in-law.

== Personal life and death ==
Paez married businessman Nicky Santiago with whom she had two children; a son and a daughter. After graduating from college, she went to work at the Grand Hyatt Hotel in Hong Kong, then became an commercial model, and a businesswoman. She died on January 13, 2026, at the age of 57.
