= Elly Koot =

Dutch model (born 1943)

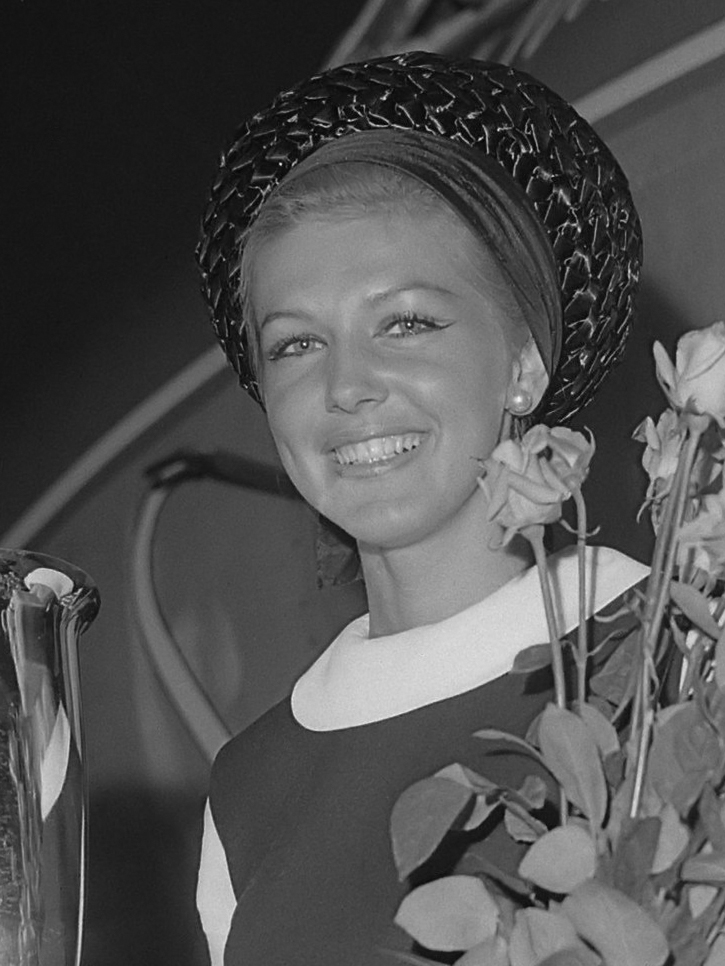
- Koot in 1964
- Born: 1943 (age 82–83)
- Height: 1.70 m (5 ft 7 in)
- Beauty pageant titleholder
- Hair color: Blonde

Elly Tibina Koot Brandt (born 1943) is a Dutch model who won the 1964 Miss Europe contest in Beirut, Lebanon.

She was born in Rotterdam, where her mother was visiting family, but grew up in Amsterdam on the Singel near the Bloemenmarkt. She was discovered by the fashion photographer Hans Dukkers. She married Frank Brandt in 1966. She and Brandt (at that time a photographer) met while shooting a commercial for Rexona - a brand of deodorant - for which he was a stand in model. Though primarily a photo model, in Amsterdam she did fashion shows for Frank Govers and Fong Leng. From 1970 she also modeled in the United States for the Wilhelmina Models agency. In the 70s she was sometimes a jury member at Dutch beauty contests. In 1976 she developed Cushing's disease for which she had a successful surgery in the United States. Since 1996 she is Dame de Salon of Mart Visser's fashion house in Amsterdam.

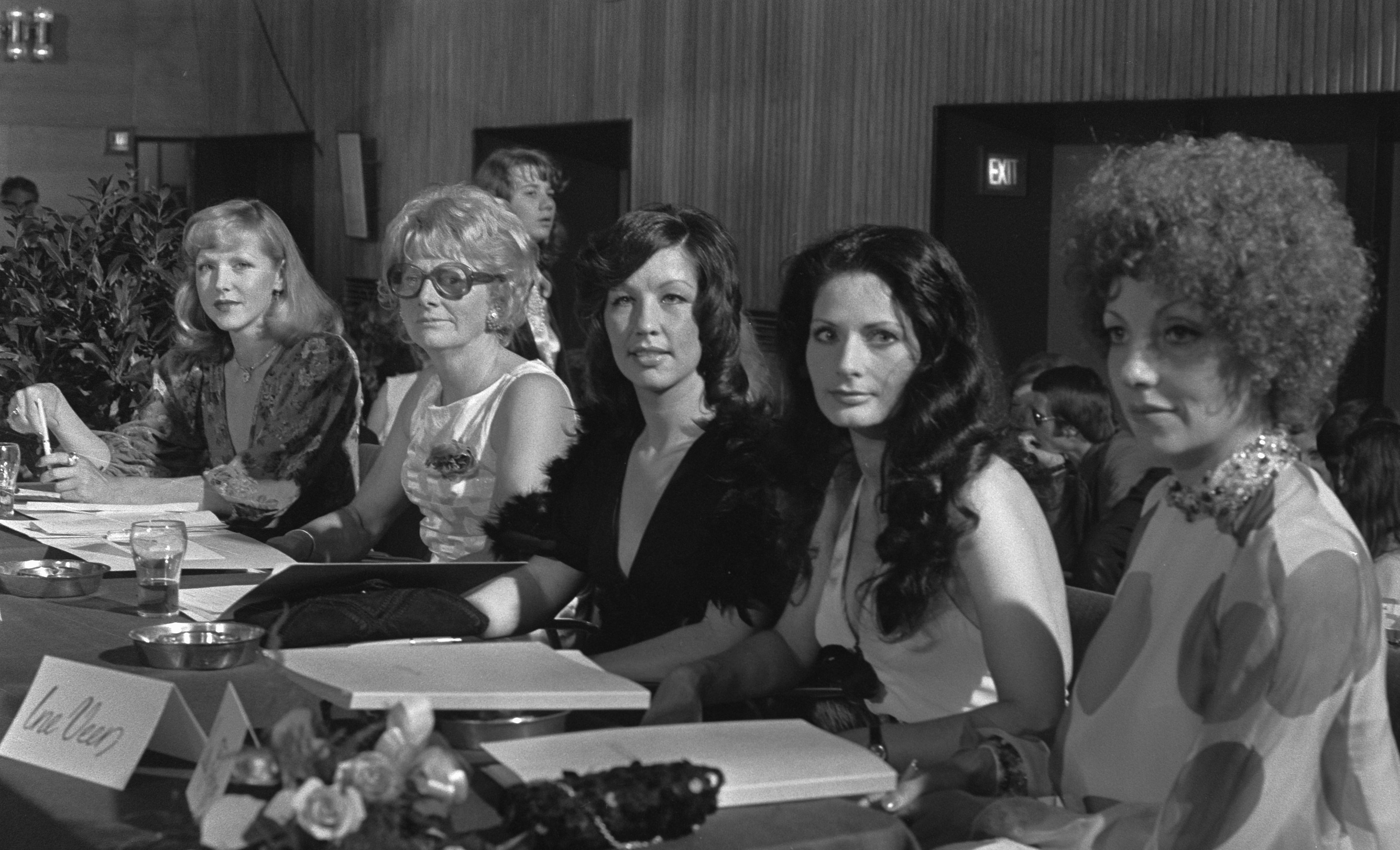
The jury of Miss Amsterdam 1973. Left to right: Elly Koot, Fanny Blankers-Koen, Jeanette Sijnen, Ine Veen and Carry Tefsen

Awards and achievements
Preceded by (Norway) Mette Stenstad	Miss Europe; 1964	Succeeded by (Germany) Juliana Herm
