= Yasmin Verheijen =

Dutch model (born 1994)

- Born: Yasmin Verheijen; 17 February 1994 (age 32); Amsterdam, Netherlands
- Height: 1.80 m (5 ft 11 in)
- Beauty pageant titleholder
- Title: Miss Nederland 2014
- Hair color: Brown
- Eye color: Brown
- Major competitions: Miss Nederland 2014 (Winner); Miss Universe 2014 (3rd Runner-Up)

Yasmin Verheijen (born 17 February 1994) is a Dutch designer, model and beauty pageant titleholder who was crowned Miss Nederland 2014. She represented her country at the Miss Universe 2014 pageant and placed 3rd Runner-Up.

== Early life ==
Yasmin Verheijen is a certified interior designer originating from Amsterdam. She is an international model. She is of Indian-Surinamese, German, Indonesian, Chinese descent.

== Pageantry ==
=== Miss Nederland 2014 ===
Verheijen was crowned as Miss Nederland 2014 (Miss Universe Netherlands 2014).

=== Miss Universe 2014 ===
Verheijen represented the Netherlands at Miss Universe 2014 where she placed as 3rd runner-up to Paulina Vega of Colombia, giving the Netherlands its highest non-winning placement at Miss Universe since 1991 when Paulien Huizinga finished as 1st runner-up.

Awards and achievements
Preceded by (Philippines) Ariella Arida	Miss Universe 3rd Runner Up; 2014	Succeeded by (France) Flora Coquerel (Australia) Monika Radulovic (Top 5)
Preceded by Stephanie Tency	Miss Nederland; 2014	Succeeded by Jessie Jazz Vuijk
