= Angela Visser =

Dutch actress, model and beauty queen (born 1966)

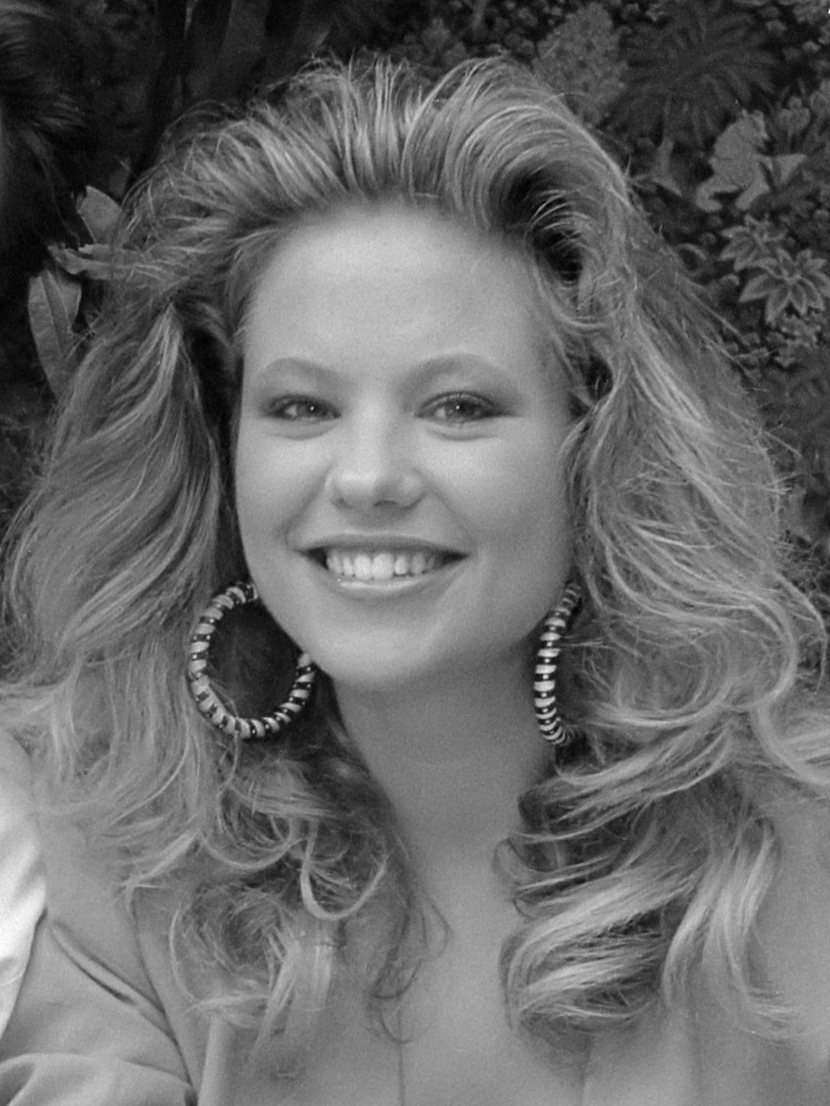
- Visser in 1989
- Born: 18 October 1966 (age 59); Nieuwerkerk aan den IJssel, Netherlands
- Occupations: Actress; model
- Height: 1.75 m (5 ft 9 in)
- Partner: Phil Missig
- Children: 1
- Beauty pageant titleholder
- Title: Miss Holland 1988; Miss Universe 1989
- Hair color: Blonde
- Eye color: Green
- Major competitions: Miss Holland 1988 (Winner); Miss World 1988 (Unplaced); Miss Universe 1989 (Winner)

Angela Visser (born 18 October 1966) is a Dutch actress, model and beauty queen who was crowned Miss Universe 1989. She is the first and so far the only Dutch woman to win the title of the Miss Universe. Visser, who had previously worked as a model and beautician, was crowned Miss Holland in August 1988.

On 5 May 1990, together with the then mayor of Rotterdam Bram Peper, she opened the European Walk of Fame. She was also the first to get her own tile along with Lee Towers.

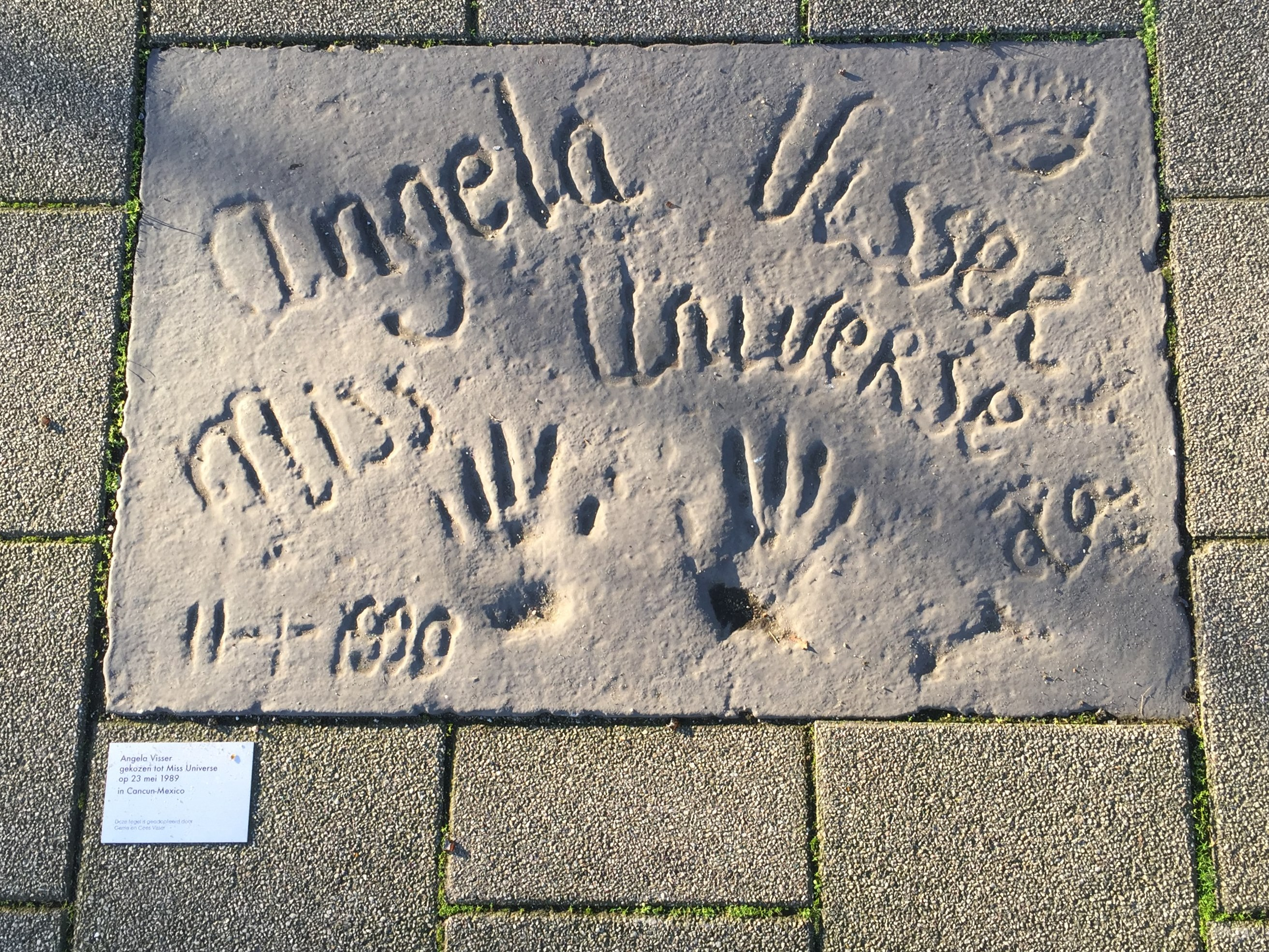
The handprint of Angela Visser at the Zuidplein metro station in Rotterdam.

== Miss Universe ==
A few months prior, she competed at Miss World 1988, but did not make it into the top ten. Then, at Miss Universe 1989, Angela swept all three semi-finals competitions and it was obvious she was the virtually unanimous choice of the judges. Placing second after her was Louise Drevenstam of Sweden, with contestants from the United States, Poland and Mexico following. Rounding up the top ten were the contestants from Germany, Venezuela, Finland, Jamaica, and Chile.

== Filmography ==
After her reign, Visser came back to the pageant to be its color commentator (from 1991 to 1994). She has also appeared in films such as Hot Under the Collar, Killer Tomatoes Eat France!, and on television shows:

Year	Title	Role	Notes
1992	Hot Under the Collar	Catherine	
1992	Killer Tomatoes Eat France	Marie	
1992	The Ben Stiller Show	Anna / Receptionist	2 episodes
1993	Acapulco H.E.A.T.	Melody	Episode: "Code Name: Million Dollar Ladies (a.k.a. Vanished)"
1993	Beverly Hills, 90210	Nina	2 episodes
1993	Blossom	Ethel the Mermaid	2 episodes
1993–1994	Baywatch	Greta / Elke	2 episodes
1995	Friends	Samantha	Episode: "The One Where the Monkey Gets Away"
1995	Boy Meets World	Rebecca-Alexa	Episode: "Train of Fools"
1996	Spy Hard	Georgeous Blonde	
1997–1999	USA High	Ms. Gabrielle Dupre	95 episodes

Awards and achievements
Preceded by (Thailand) Porntip Nakhirunkanok	Miss Universe; 1989	Succeeded by (Norway) Mona Grudt
Preceded by Angelique Cremers	Miss Nederland World; 1988	Succeeded by Liesbeth Caspers
Preceded by Annabet Berendsen	Miss Nederland Universe; 1989	Succeeded by Stephanie Halenbeek
Preceded by Angelique Cremers	Miss Holland; 1988	Succeeded by Stephanie Halenbeek
Media offices
Preceded by Leeza Gibbons and Margaret Gardiner	Miss Universe color commentator (with Leeza Gibbons); 1991–1992 (with Cecilia Bolocco); 1993 (with Arthel Neville); 1994	Succeeded by Daisy Fuentes
Preceded by Tracy Scoggins	Miss Teen USA color commentator (with Marcia Strassman); 1989	Succeeded by Leeza Gibbons and Kelly Hu
