= Avalon-Chanel Weyzig =

Dutch model (born 1990)

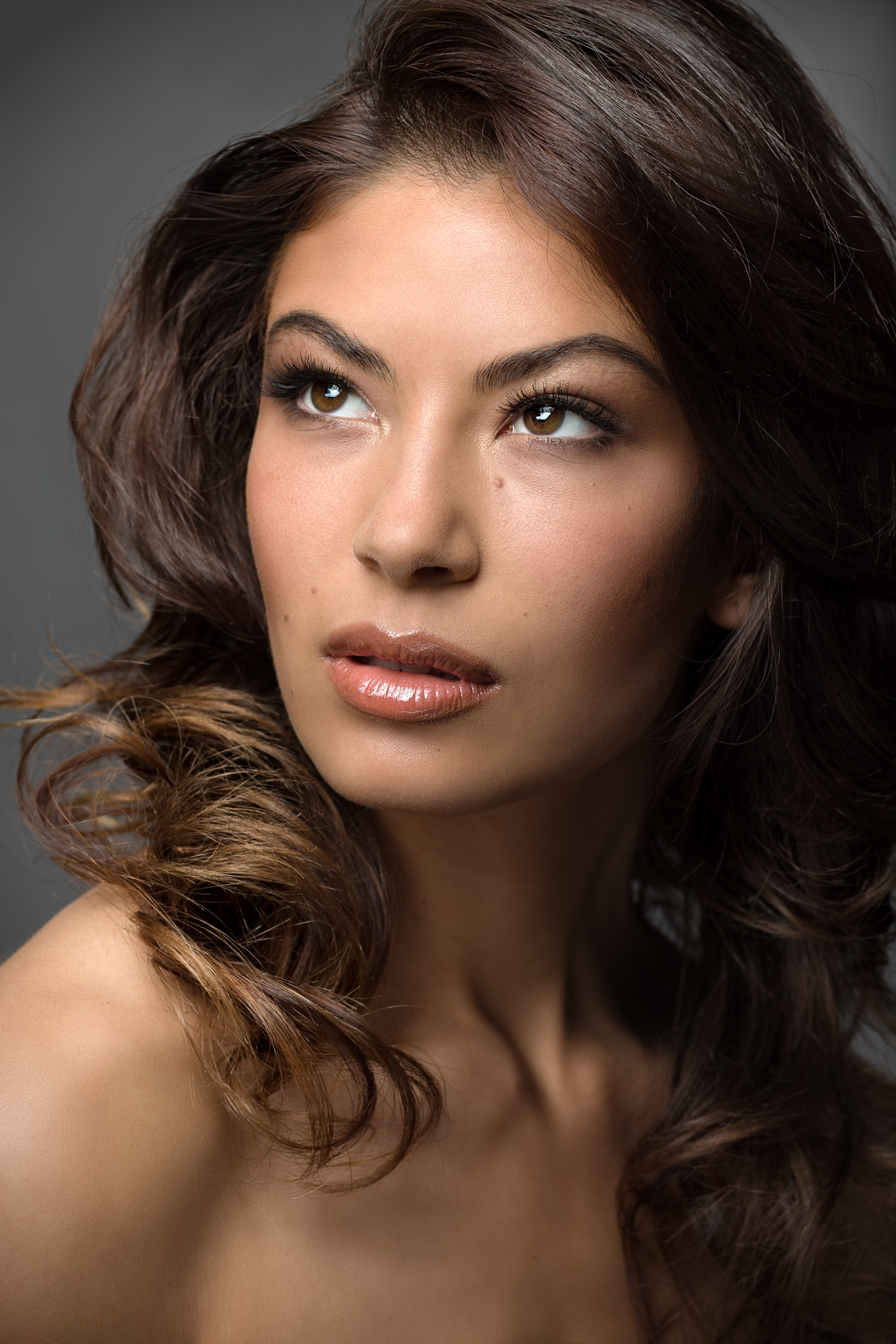
- Born: Avalon Chanel Weijzig; 2 April 1990 (age 36); Zwolle, Netherlands
- Height: 1.73 m (5 ft 8 in)
- Beauty pageant titleholder
- Title: Miss Nederland 2009
- Hair color: Brown
- Eye color: Brown
- Major competitions: Miss Nederland 2009 (Winner); Miss Universe 2009 (Unplaced); Miss World 2009 (Unplaced); Miss World Cup 2010 (3rd runner-up)

Avalon-Chanel Weyzig (born 2 April 1990) is a Dutch model and beauty pageant titleholder who was crowned Miss Nederland 2009 and represented her country in the 2009 Miss Universe and Miss World pageants.

== Early life ==
Born in Zwolle to parents of Indonesian descent, Weyzig has an older brother and one little sister. In 2008, she lived for a year in Barcelona, where she learned Spanish. She also speaks fluent English, likes dancing, singing, shopping; and is currently studying international media and entertainment in Haarlem.

== Miss Universe Nederland 2009 ==
Weyzig, who stands 1.73 m (5 ft 8 in) tall, competed as one of 12 finalists in her country's national beauty pageant, Miss Universe Netherlands 2009, held in Noordwijk on 27 June 2009, when she was crowned the eventual winner of the title, gaining the right to represent the Netherlands in Miss Universe 2009.

== Miss Universe 2009 ==
As the official representative of her country to the 2009 Miss Universe pageant, broadcast live from Nassau, Bahamas on 23 August 2009, Weyzig competed as one of 84 contestants, wearing an evening gown designed by Addy van den Krommenacker and was considered one of the favorites for the title.

== Miss World 2009 ==
Four months later, she was asked to represent the Netherlands in the 2009 Miss World pageant, held in Johannesburg on 12 December 2009, where she was going to participate in the 2010 FIFA World Cup final draw, but was told she wouldn't at the last second and some of her wardrobe was subsequently stolen.

== Miss World Cup 2010 ==
In June 2010 Weyzig represented the Netherlands in Miss World Cup 2010, a contest held in Germany to celebrate the 2010 FIFA World Cup, with a representative from each of the 32 participating nations. Weyzig placed third overall.

Awards and achievements
Preceded by Charlotte Labee	Miss Nederland; 2009	Succeeded by Desiree van den Berg
Preceded by (Ecuador) Catalina López	Miss World Cup 3rd Runner-Up; 2010	Succeeded by (Ecuador) Laritza Párraga
