= Miss Grand Netherlands 2018 =

3rd Miss Grand Netherlands competition, beauty pageant edition

- Date: June 17, 2018
- Venue: Apollo Hotel, Vinkeveen
- Broadcaster: YouTube
- Entrants: 10
- Placements: 3
- Winner: Kimberley Xhofleer (North Brabant)
- Photogenic: Rosella Chialastri (Flevoland)

Miss Grand Netherlands 2018 was the third edition of the Miss Grand Netherlands beauty pageant, held at the Apollo Hotel, Vinkeveen, Netherlands, on June 17, 2018. Ten candidates who qualified through the casting process held earlier in March competed for the title, and a businessperson from North Brabant, Kimberley Xhofleer, was named the winner. Kimberley then represented the country at the Miss Grand International 2018 pageant in Yangon, Myanmar, but was unplaced.

Initially, the pageant was expected to be participated by twelve national candidates. Still, two of them, Deborah van Hemert of Gelderland and Ashley van Bree of Overijssel withdrew for undisclosed reasons.

Moreover, the first runner-up in the pageant, Safina Barsatie of South Holland, who was born in Suriname's capital, Paramaribo, was later appointed as "Miss Grand Suriname 2018", but she also was unplaced at the international contest in Myanmar.

== Result ==
Position	Candidate
Miss Grand Netherlands 2018	North Brabant – Kimberley Xhofleer
1st runner-up	South Holland – Safina Barsatie
2nd runner-up	Limburg – Esmeralda Carelse
Special awards
Miss Photogenic	Flevoland – Rosella Chialastri
Miss Top Model	South Holland – Safina Barsatie

== Candidates ==
Ten candidates competed for the title of Miss Grand Netherlands 2018.

- Drenthe – Lisan Weidgraaf
- Flevoland – Rosella Chialastri
- Friesland – Demy van der Heide
- Gelderland – Deborah van Hemert (Withdrew)
- Groningen – Jeanne Molenaar
- Limburg – Esmeralda Carelse
- North Brabant – Kimberley Xhofleer
- North Holland – Michantely Lisse
- Overijssel – Ashley van Bree (Withdrew)
- South Holland – Safina Barsatie
- Utrecht – Hannah Potuyt
- Zeeland – Jessica Wohrmann
