= Zoey Ivory =

Dutch model and beauty pageant titleholder

- Born: Zoey Ivory van der Koelen; 5 July 1993 (age 33); Almere, Netherlands
- Height: 1.81 m (5 ft 11 in)
- Beauty pageant titleholder
- Title: Miss Nederland 2016
- Hair color: Dark brown
- Eye color: Hazel
- Major competitions: Miss Nederland 2016 (Winner); Miss Universe 2016 (Unplaced)

Zoey Ivory van der Koelen (born 5 July 1993) is a Dutch model and beauty pageant titleholder who won Miss Nederland 2016 and represented Netherlands in Miss Universe 2016 in Manila, Philippines.

== Pageantry ==
=== Miss Nederland 2016 ===
On 26 September 2016 Zoey was crowned Miss Nederland 2016 and represented the Netherlands at Miss Universe 2016.

=== Miss Universe 2016 ===
Zoey represented the Netherlands during Miss Universe 2016, but did not place. Zoey did not win the crown, but gained fame for her dancing to Beyoncé's Single Ladies, especially in the Philippines.

Awards and achievements
Preceded by Jessie Jazz Vuijk	Miss Nederland; 2016	Succeeded by Nicky Opheij
