= Kim Kötter =

Dutch model

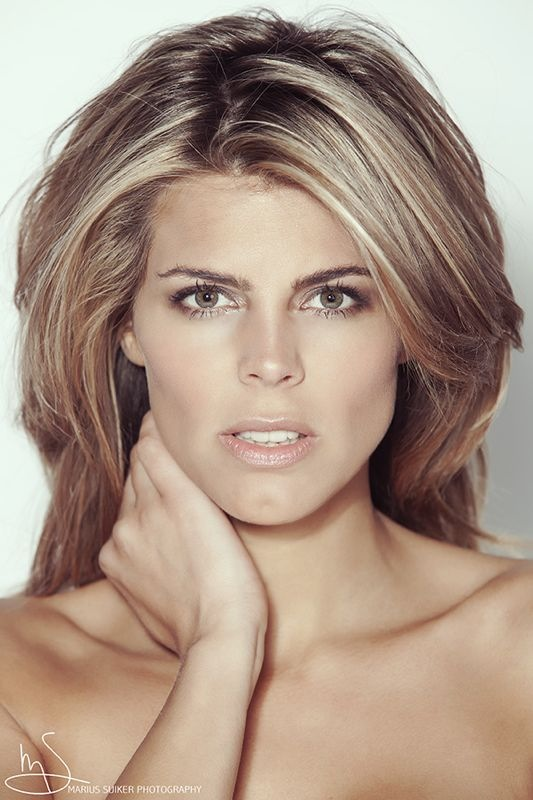
- Kötter in 2013
- Born: 27 July 1982 (age 44); Losser, Twente, Netherlands
- Height: 5 ft 9 in (1.75 m)
- Beauty pageant titleholder
- Title: Miss Overijssel 2002; Miss Universe Nederland 2002
- Hair color: Blonde
- Eye color: Brown
- Major competitions: Miss Overijssel 2002 (Winner); Miss Universe Netherlands 2002 (Winner); Miss Universe 2002 (Unplaced); Miss Europe 2002 (3rd Runner-up)

Kim Kötter (born 27 July 1982) is a Dutch director, model and beauty pageant titleholder. She was crowned Miss Universe Netherlands 2002 and competed at the Miss Universe 2002 pageant where she placed 11th in the preliminaries, missing the top 10 by one spot. She also competed in the Miss Europe 2002 pageant where she placed 3rd runner up. Kötter currently runs her own modelling agency, and is the organizer of the Miss Overijssel, Miss Nederland and Miss Universe Germany beauty pageants. In 2011, Kötter competed on the Dutch version of the television show Fort Boyard.
