= Rahima Dirkse =

Dutch model and beauty pageant titleholder

- Born: Rahima Ayla Dirkse; 1993 (age 32–33); Rotterdam, Netherlands
- Height: 1.80 m (5 ft 11 in)
- Beauty pageant titleholder
- Title: Miss Nederland 2018
- Hair color: Black
- Eye color: Brown
- Major competitions: Miss Nederland 2018 (Winner); Miss Universe 2018 (Unplaced)

Rahima Ayla Dirkse (born 1993 in Rotterdam) is a Dutch model and beauty pageant titleholder who won Miss Nederland 2018 on 9 July 2018. She represented the Netherlands at Miss Universe 2018 pageant but unplaced.

== Personal life ==
Rahima is raised in Rotterdam, Netherlands. Rahima, who has a Brazilian mother and a Dutch father. She is a student of bio-pharmaceutical sciences and works at her aunt's clothing store during the week.

== Pageantry ==
=== Miss Nederland 2018 ===
Dirkse from Rotterdam was crowned Miss Nederland 2018 at a crowning gala held on 9 July 2018 at the AFAS Circustheater, Zuid-Holland. She succeeded outgoing Miss Nederland 2017 Nicky Opheij.

=== Miss Universe 2018 ===
Dirkse represented the Netherlands at Miss Universe 2018 pageant in Bangkok, Thailand, but failed to place.

Awards and achievements
Preceded by Nicky Opheij	Miss Nederland; 2018	Succeeded by Sharon Pieksma
