= Stephanie Tency =

Dutch actress and model (born 1990)

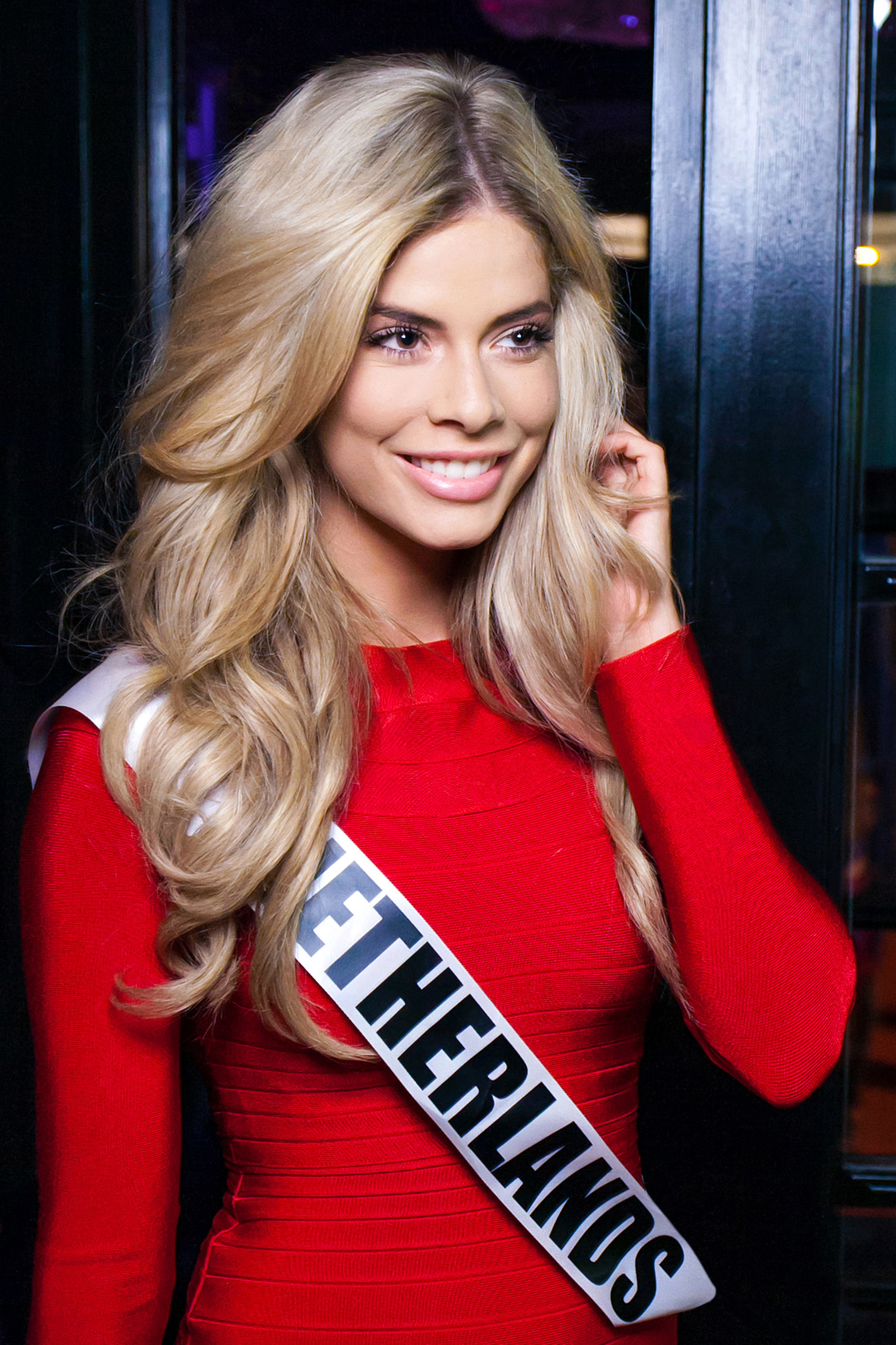
- Born: Stephanie Tency; 12 December 1990 (age 35); Amsterdam, Netherlands
- Height: 1.73 m (5 ft 8 in)
- Beauty pageant titleholder
- Title: Miss Nederland 2013
- Hair color: Blonde
- Eye color: Brown
- Major competitions: Miss Universe 2013 (Unplaced)

Stephanie Tency (born 12 December 1990) is a Dutch actress, TV host, model and beauty pageant titleholder who was crowned Miss Universe Netherlands 2013 and represented her country at the Miss Universe 2013 pageant. She stopped her modeling and presenting career the end of 2014 to start her own business called Tency Productions. She makes programs for the Dutch commercial television channel RTL 4.

In 2016 Tency, became the assistant of André Hazes Jr. in the gameshow Wheel of Fortune (a.k.a. Rad van Fortuin in Dutch) broadcast by SBS.

== Early life ==
Tency is of Indonesian, German and Armenian descent. Tency studied fashion styling media. She worked as a model and presenter/actress for the Dutch television. She is also an ambassador for Free a Girl and Energy4All.

== Miss Nederland 2013 ==
Miss North Holland, Tency was crowned Miss Nederland 2013 on 10 December 2012 and later represented the Netherlands at Miss Universe 2013 on 9 November 2013 and was placed 18th.

== Personal life ==
According to her Instagram account, Tency currently resides in Amsterdam.

Awards and achievements
Preceded by Nathalie den Dekker	Miss Nederland; 2013	Succeeded by Yasmin Verheijen
