= Kelly Weekers =

Dutch model

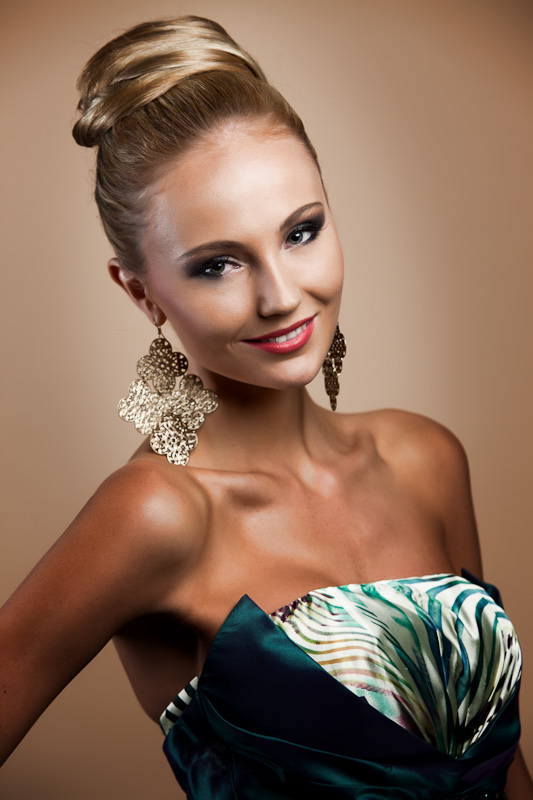
- Born: August 20, 1989 (age 36); Weert, Netherlands
- Height: 1.80 m (5 ft 11 in)
- Title: Miss Nederland 2011 (Winner); Miss Universe 2011 (Top 16) bestseller author see https://www.debestseller60.nl/zoeken/kelly%20weekers multiple bestsellers The Power of Choice, Choosing Me and Happy Life 365. Self publish author see https://www.deondernemer.nl/media/bestselleruitgeverij-moonshot-publishing-ons-doel-kelly-weekers-op-de-bank-bij-oprah~52d6521?referrer=https%3A%2F%2Fwww.google.com%2F
- Website: kellyweekers.com

Kelly Weekers (born 20 August 1989) is a beauty pageant contestant. She was crowned Miss Nederland 2011.

== Career ==
=== Pageantry ===
In April 2011, Weekers became Miss Limburg (the Miss of her province), which automatically qualified her for the grand final of Miss Netherlands, which she won on July 10, 2011. At the age of 21, Weekers became Miss Netherlands Universe, which made her one of the 89 official contestants of the Miss Universe 2011 pageant. In September, she went to Brazil for a month to compete for the title of Miss Universe 2011.

She went from the Five Star Diamond Awards in Cannes to judging a pageant in Washington, D.C., and made an appearance at the Grand Prix in Singapore. In between, Weekers did her model castings in Amsterdam, Milan and Munich.

Awards and achievements
Preceded by Desirée van den Berg	Miss Nederland; 2011	Succeeded by Nathalie den Dekker
