= Jessie Jazz Vuijk =

Dutch model and beauty pageant titleholder

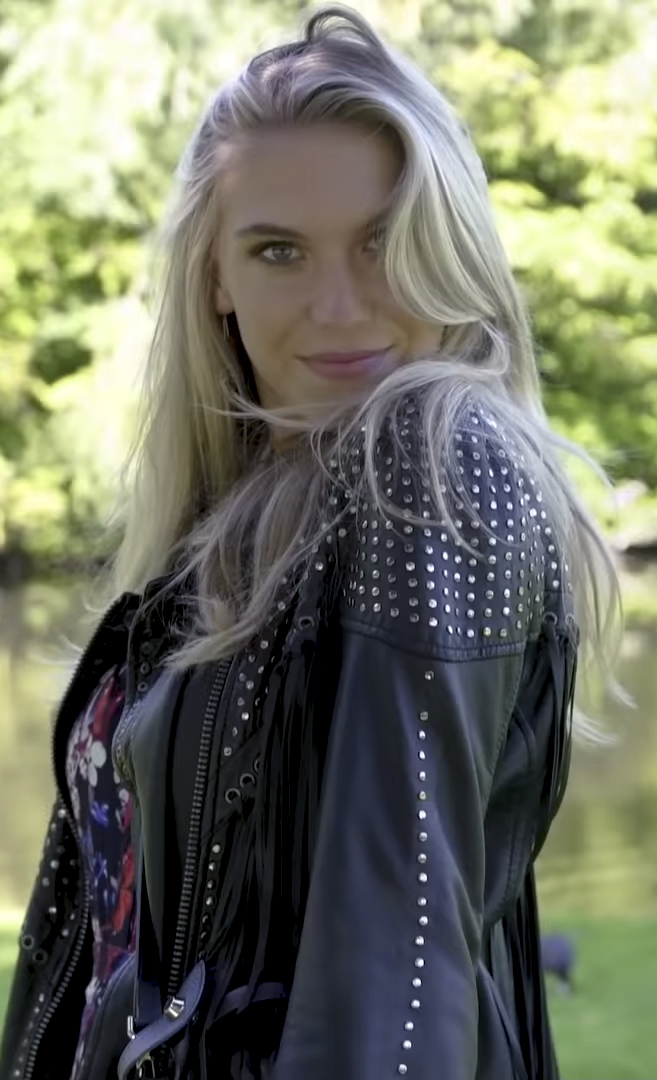
- Born: Jessie Jazz Vuijk; 22 January 1995 (age 31); Rotterdam, Netherlands
- Height: 1.78 m (5 ft 10 in)
- Beauty pageant titleholder
- Title: Miss Nederland 2015
- Hair color: Blonde
- Eye color: Blue
- Major competitions: Miss Nederland 2015 (Winner); Miss Universe 2015 (Unplaced)

Jessie Jazz Vuijk (born 22 January 1995) is a Dutch model and beauty pageant titleholder who was crowned Miss Nederland 2015 and represented the Netherlands at the Miss Universe 2015 pageant.

== Personal life ==
Vuijk was born in Rotterdam. She graduated from Stanislascollege Pijnacker, South Holland, Netherlands. She started modelling when she was 17. She lived in Istanbul for three months for her modeling work. Currently, Vuijk is studying Event Management, where she recently finished her internship as a booker.

=== Miss Nederland 2015 ===
On 7 September 2015 Vuijk was crowned Miss Nederland 2015 by Yasmin Verheijen, Miss Universe Nederland 2014, and Tatjana Maul, Miss World Nederland 2015, at National Palace Auditorium, Amsterdam, Netherlands. Twelve contestants from across the Netherlands competed for the crown. As Miss Nederland 2015, Vuijk represented her country at the Miss Universe 2015 pageant on 20 December 2015 in Las Vegas, United States, but was ultimately unplaced.

Awards and achievements
Preceded by Yasmin Verheijen	Miss Nederland; 2015	Succeeded by Zoey Ivory
