= Miss Universe 1989 =

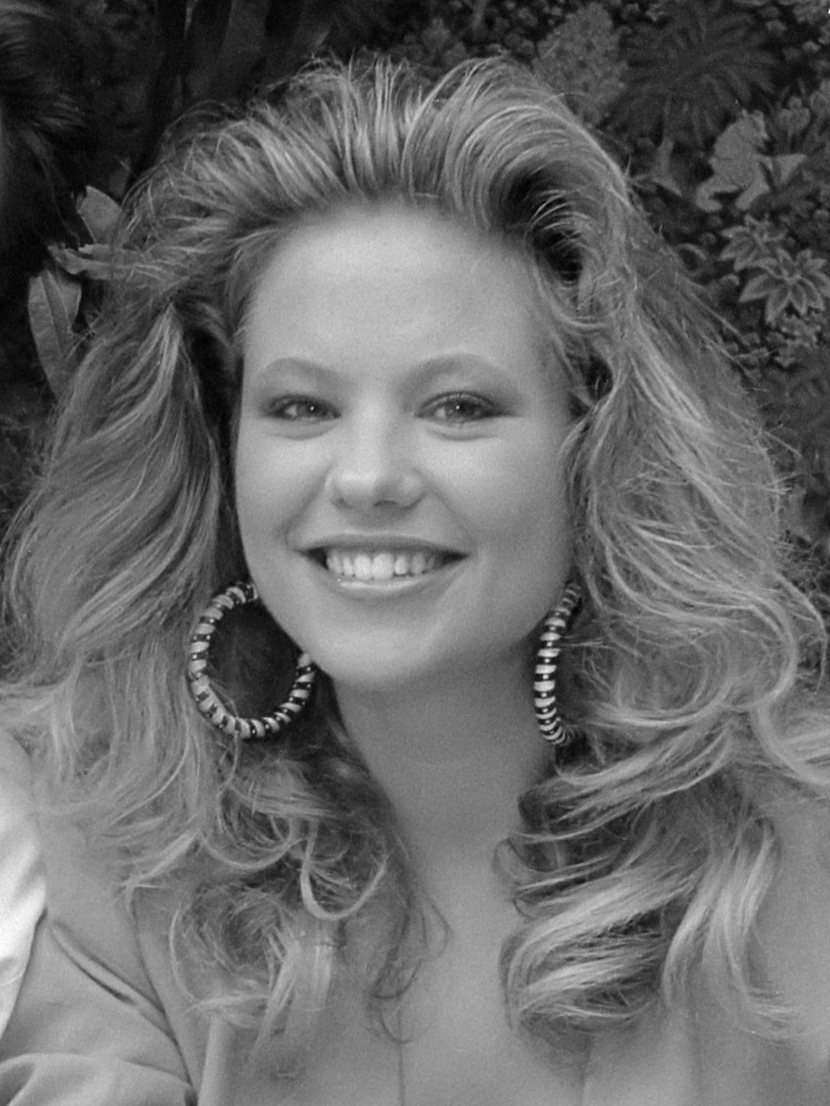
- Miss Universe 1989, Angela Visser
- Date: 23 May 1989
- Presenters: John Forsythe; Emma Samms; Karen Baldwin
- Venue: Fiesta Americana Condesa Hotel, Cancún, Mexico
- Broadcaster: CBS; Televisa
- Entrants: 76
- Placements: 10
- Withdrawals: Lebanon
- Returns: Aruba; Belize; Cayman Islands; Curaçao; Greece; Haiti; India; Mauritius; Poland; Saint Vincent and the Grenadines; Suriname
- Winner: Angela Visser; Holland
- Congeniality: Sharon Simons (Turks and Caicos Islands)
- Best National Costume: Flávia Cavalcanti (Brazil)
- Photogenic: Karen Wenden (Australia)

Miss Universe 1989, the 38th Miss Universe pageant, was held at the Fiesta Americana Condesa Hotel in Cancún, Mexico, on 23 May 1989. Angela Visser of Holland was crowned by Porntip Nakhirunkanok of Thailand at the end of the event. Seventy-six contestants competed in the pageant.

== Results ==
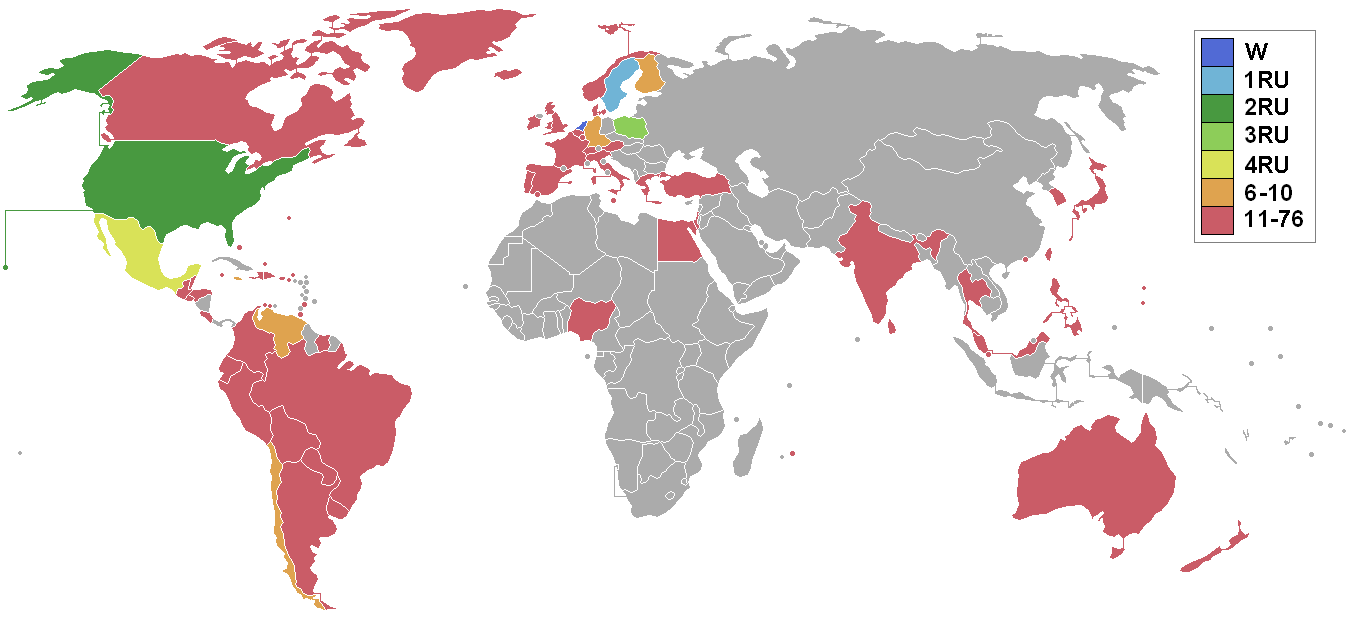
Countries and territories which sent delegates and results for Miss Universe 1989

=== Placements ===
Placement	Contestant
Miss Universe 1989	Holland – Angela Visser
1st Runner-Up	Sweden – Louise Drevenstam
2nd Runner-Up	United States – Gretchen Polhemus
3rd Runner-Up	Poland – Joanna Gapińska
4th Runner-Up	Mexico – Adriana Abascal
Top 10	Chile – Macarena Mina; Finland – Åsa Lövdahl; Jamaica – Sandra Foster; Venezuela – Eva Lisa Ljung; West Germany – Andrea Stelzer

=== Final Competition ===
Nation	Interview	Swimsuit	Evening Gown	Semifinal Average
Holland	9.583 (1)	9.725 (1)	9.824 (1)	9.710 (1)
Sweden	9.261 (2)	9.233 (2)	9.376 (2)	9.290 (2)
United States	8.511 (5)	8.894 (4)	8.927 (8)	8.777 (5)
Poland	8.472 (6)	9.105 (3)	9.027 (4)	8.868 (3)
Mexico	8.650 (3)	8.883 (5)	9.026 (5)	8.853 (4)
West Germany	8.461 (7)	8.737 (7)	9.010 (6)	8.736 (6)
Venezuela	8.204 (8)	8.727 (8)	9.096 (3)	8.675 (7)
Finland	8.533 (4)	8.661 (9)	8.755 (9)	8.649 (8)
Jamaica	8.111 (9)	8.788 (6)	8.933 (7)	8.610 (9)
Chile	8.033 (10)	8.505 (10)	8.755 (9)	8.431 (10)

== Contestants ==
- Argentina – Luisa Norbis
- Aruba – Karina Felix
- Australia – Karen Wenden
- Austria – Bettina Berghold
- Bahamas – Tasha Ramirez
- Belgium – Anne de Baetzelier
- Belize – Andrea Sherman McKoy
- Bermuda – Cornelia Furbert
- Bolivia – Raquel Cors Ulloa
- Brazil – Flávia Cavalcanti
- British Virgin Islands – Viola Joseph
- Canada – Juliette Powell
- Cayman Islands – Carol Ann Balls
- Chile – María Macarena Mina Garachena
- Colombia – María Teresa Egurrola Hinojosa
- Costa Rica – Luana Freer Bustamante
- Curaçao – Anna Mosteiro
- Denmark – Louise Mejlhede
- Dominican Republic – Anny Canaán Camido
- Ecuador – María Eugenia Molina
- Egypt – Sally Attah
- El Salvador – Beatriz López Rodríguez
- England – Raquel Marie Jory
- Finland – Åsa Lövdahl
- France – Pascale Meotti
- Gibraltar – Tatiana Desoisa
- Greece – Kristiana Latani
- Greenland – Naja-Rie Sorensen
- Guam – Janice Santos
- Guatemala – Helka Cuevas
- Haiti – Glaphyra Jean-Louis
- Holland – Angela Visser
- Honduras – Frances Siryl Milla
- Hong Kong – Cynthia Yuk Lui Cheung
- Iceland – Guðbjörg Gissurardóttir
- India – Dolly Minhas
- Ireland – Colette Jackson
- Israel – Nicole Halperin
- Italy – Christiana Bertasi
- Jamaica – Sandra Foster
- Japan – Eri Tashiro
- Luxembourg – Chris Scott
- Malaysia – Carmen Cheah Swee
- Malta – Sylvana Sammut Pandolfino
- Mauritius – Jacky Randabel
- Mexico – Adriana Abascal
- New Zealand – Shelley Soffe
- Nigeria – Bianca Onoh
- Northern Mariana Islands – Soreen Villanueva
- Norway – Lene Ornhoft
- Paraguay – Ana Victoria Schaerer
- Peru – Mariana Sovero
- Philippines – Sara Jane Paez
- Poland – Joanna Gapińska
- Portugal – Anna Francisco Sobrinho
- Puerto Rico – Catalina Villar
- Republic of China – Chen Yen Ping
- Saint Vincent and the Grenadines – Camille Samuels
- Scotland – Victoria Susannah Lace
- Singapore – Pauline Chong
- South Korea – Kim Sung-ryung
- Spain – Eva Pedraza
- Sri Lanka – Veronica Ruston
- Suriname – Consuela Cruden
- Sweden – Louise Drevenstam
- Switzerland – Karina Berger
- Thailand – Yonlada Ronghanam
- Trinidad and Tobago – Guenevere Helen Keishall
- Turkey – Jasmine Baradan
- Turks and Caicos Islands – Sharon Simons
- United States – Gretchen Polhemus
- United States Virgin Islands – Nathalie Lynch
- Uruguay – Carolina Pies Riet
- Venezuela – Eva Lisa Ljung
- Wales – Andrea Caroline Jones
- West Germany – Andrea Stelzer

== Notes ==
- Saint Vincent and the Grenadines competed for the first time as a sovereign state after gained independence from the United Kingdom in late 1979, even though the British territory of Saint Vincent had competed before in 1964, 1978 and 1979.

=== Returns ===
Last competed in 1979:

- Mauritius
- Saint Vincent and the Grenadines

Last competed in 1982:

- Suriname

Last competed in 1985:

- Cayman Islands
- Haiti

Last competed in 1986:

- Aruba
- Poland

Last competed in 1987:

- Belize
- Curaçao
- Greece
- India

=== Other Notes ===
- Netherlands – Angela Visser competed in Miss World in 1988, but was unplaced behind Linda Pétursdóttir of Iceland. Shortly after, she participated in Miss Universe and clinched the crown, making her the first and only Dutch woman to achieve this honor

=== Replacements ===
- France – Miss France 1989, Stephanie "Peggy" Zlotkowski, was underage before February 1. During the competition in Cancun, she was replaced by her fourth runner-up, Pascale Meotti, in an emergency change.
- El Salvador – Miss El Salvador 1988, Maria Eugenia Duarte, relinquished her national title to marry. Her first runner-up, Lucía Beatriz López Rodríguez, got the title.
- Iceland – Miss Iceland 1988, Linda Pétursdóttir, had won Miss World 1988. That disabled her from competing at Miss Universe 1989, so her first runner-up, Gudbjörg Gissurardóttir, went instead.
- Hong Kong – Miss Hong Kong 1988, Michelle Reis, withdrew due to her health issues at the time. Her first runner-up, Cynthia Cheung Yuk-Lui, went to Miss Universe 1989 instead.

=== Awards ===
- Turks and Caicos Islands – Miss Amity (Sharon Simons)
- Australia – Miss Photogenic (Karen Wenden)
- Brazil – Best National Costume (Flavia Cavalcanti)
