= Nathalie den Dekker =

Dutch lawyer and beauty queen

- Born: Nathalie Marina Hendrika Maria Den Dekker; 26 June 1989 (age 37); Made, Netherlands
- Height: 1.68 m (5 ft 6 in)
- Beauty pageant titleholder
- Title: Miss Nederland 2012
- Hair color: Blonde
- Eye color: Brown
- Major competitions: Miss Supranational 2010 (Unplaced); Miss Tourism Queen of the Year 2010 (Top 20); Miss Bikini International (Top 26); Miss Tourism International 2010 (Winner); Miss Nederland 2012 (Winner); Miss World 2012 (Top 15); Miss Universe 2012 (Unplaced); Miss International 2013 (1st runner-up)

Nathalie Marina Hendrika Maria Den Dekker (26 June 1989) is a Dutch lawyer, model and beauty queen who was crowned Miss Universe Netherlands 2012 and represented her country at the Miss Universe 2012 pageant as well as other international pageants.

== Early life ==
Den Dekker studied law. Her interests include reading, spending time with friends and family, and swimming. She describes herself as a confident person who is hard-working, friendly, and committed.

== Designations ==
Den Dekker was designated as representative for the Netherlands at Miss World and Miss Universe 2012 by Kim Kotter, national director of Miss Nederland, as Miss Nederland took place during the Miss Universe competition.

== International pageants ==
- 2010: Miss Supranational in Poland
- 2010: Miss Tourism Queen of the Year International in China (Top 20)
- 2010: Miss Bikini International in China (Top 26, Miss Bikini Healthy Winner)
- 2010: Miss Tourism International in Malaysia (Winner)
- 2012: Miss World in China (Top 15)
- 2012: Miss Universe in the United States (2nd Runner-up in National costume)
- 2013: Miss International in Japan (1st runner up)

Awards and achievements
Preceded by (Finland) Viivi Suominen	Miss International 1st Runner-Up; 2013	Succeeded by (Colombia) Zuleika Suárez
Preceded by Kelly Weekers	Miss Nederland; 2012	Succeeded by Stephanie Tency

Awards and achievements
Preceded by Jill de Robles	Miss World Nederland; 2012	Succeeded by Jacqueline Steenbeek
