= List of Miss Universe runners-up and finalists =

This is a list of Miss Universe titleholders, runners-up, finalists, and semifinalists since the inaugural edition of the competition in 1952 to the present.

== Names of titleholders, runners-up, and finalists ==
This list includes the name and country or territory of the winners, runners-up, and finalists in Miss Universe since the first edition of the competition in 1952.

From 1952 to 1989, 2001 to 2014, 2020, 2024 to 2025, the "Miss Universe" title and the "First", "Second," "Third," and "Fourth Runner-Up" titles were awarded among the last five remaining finalists (Top 5) in the pageant. From 1990 to 1997 and 2016, the number of finalists was increased to six (Top 6), but only the Miss Universe title, and the first and second runner-up titles were awarded among the last three finalists (Top 3). From 1998 to 2000, 2015, 2017 to 2019, and 2021 to 2023, the number of finalists was reverted to five (Top 5), but only the Miss Universe title, and the first and second runner-up titles were awarded among the last three finalists (Top 3). Thus, several editions of the pageant do not have an official third and fourth runner-up awardee, as the finalists who would have received these titles finished with a "Top 5" or "Top 6" placement instead.

Edition	Miss Universe (1st Place)	1st Runner-Up (2nd Place)	2nd Runner-Up (3rd Place)	3rd Runner-Up (4th Place)	4th Runner-Up (5th Place)	Top 5/6 (4th, 5th, or 6th Place)
1952	Armi Kuusela (Relinquished) (Note: Armi Kuusela relinquished her title as Miss Universe 1952 shortly before her reign was scheduled to end to marry Filipino businessman, Virgilio Hilario, on May 4, 1953. Despite this, her resignation was not made official by the Miss Universe Organization.); Finland	Elsa Edsman; Hawaii	Ntaizy "Daisy" Mavraki; Greece	Judy Dan; Hong Kong	Renate Hoy; West Germany	5 finalists awarded titles
1953	Christiane Martel; France	Myrna Rae Hansen; United States	Kinuko Ito; Japan	Ana Bertha Lepe; Mexico	Maxine Morgan; Australia	5 finalists awarded titles
1954	Miriam Stevenson; United States	Martha Rocha; Brazil	Virginia Lee Wai-Chun; Hong Kong	Regina Ernst; West Germany	Ragnhild Olausson; Sweden	5 finalists awarded titles
1955	Hillevi Rombin; Sweden	Maribel Arrieta Gálvez; El Salvador	Maureen Hingert; Ceylon	Margit Nünke; West Germany	Keiko Takahashi; Japan	5 finalists awarded titles
1956	Carol Morris; United States	Marina Orschel; West Germany	Ingrid Goude; Sweden	Kathleen Waller; England	Rosanna Galli; Italy	5 finalists awarded titles
1957	Gladys Zender; Peru	Terezinha Morango; Brazil	Sonia Hamilton; England	Maria Fernandez; Cuba	Gerti Daub; West Germany	5 finalists awarded titles
1958	Luz Marina Zuluaga; Colombia	Adalgisa Colombo; Brazil	Geri Hoo; Hawaii	Eurlyne Howell; United States	Alicja Bobrowska; Poland	5 finalists awarded titles
1959	Akiko Kojima; Japan	Jorunn Kristjansen; Norway	Terry Huntingdon; United States	Pamela Anne Searle; England	Vera Regina Ribeiro; Brazil	5 finalists awarded titles
1960	Linda Bement; United States	Daniela Bianchi; Italy	Elizabeth Hodacs; Austria	Nicolette Caras; South Africa	Teresa del Río; Spain	5 finalists awarded titles
1961	Marlene Schmidt; West Germany	Rosemarie Frankland; Wales	Adriana Gardiazábal; Argentina	Arlette Dobson; England	Sharon Brown; United States	5 finalists awarded titles
1962	Norma Nolan; Argentina	Anna Geirsdóttir; Iceland	Anja Aulikki Järvinen; Finland	Helen Liu Shiu-Man; Republic of China	Maria Olívia Rebouças; Brazil	5 finalists awarded titles
1963	Iêda Maria Vargas; Brazil	Aino Korva; Denmark	Marlene McKeown; Ireland	Lalaine Bennett; Philippines	Kim Myoung-ja; South Korea	5 finalists awarded titles
1964	Corinna Tsopei; Greece	Brenda Blackler; England	Ronit Renat Rechtman; Israel	Siv Märta Åberg; Sweden	Lana Yu Yi; Republic of China	5 finalists awarded titles
1965	Apasra Hongsakula; Thailand	Virpi Liisa Miettinen; Finland	Sue Downey; United States	Ingrid Norman; Sweden	Anja Schuit; Holland	5 finalists awarded titles
1966	Margareta Arvidsson; Sweden	Satu Charlotta Östring; Finland	Cheranand Savetanand; Thailand	Yasmin Daji; India	Aviva Israeli; Israel	5 finalists awarded titles
1967	Sylvia Hitchcock; United States	Mariela Pérez; Venezuela	Jennifer Lynn Lewis; England	Ritva Lehto; Finland	Batya Kabiri; Israel	5 finalists awarded titles
1968	Martha Vasconcellos; Brazil	Anne Braafheid; Curaçao	Leena Brusin; Finland	Peggy Kopp; Venezuela	Dorothy Anstett; United States	5 finalists awarded titles
1969	Gloria Diaz; Philippines	Harriet Eriksson; Finland	Joanne Barret; Australia	Chava Levy; Israel	Kikuyo Osuka; Japan	5 finalists awarded titles
1970	Marisol Malaret; Puerto Rico	Deborah Shelton; United States	Joan Zealand; Australia	Jun Shimada; Japan	Beatriz Gross; Argentina	5 finalists awarded titles
1971	Georgina Rizk; Lebanon	Toni Rayward; Australia	Pirjo Laitila; Finland	Beba Franco; Puerto Rico	Eliane Guimaraes; Brazil	5 finalists awarded titles
1972	Kerry Anne Wells; Australia	Rejane Costa; Brazil	María Antonieta Cámpoli; Venezuela	Ilana Goren; Israel	Jennifer "Jenny" McAdam; England	5 finalists awarded titles
1973	Margie Moran; Philippines	Amanda Jones; United States	Aina Walle; Norway	María Madrigal; Spain	Limor Schreibman; Israel	5 finalists awarded titles
1974	Amparo Muñoz (Resigned) †; Spain	Helen Morgan; Wales	Ritta Johanna Raunio; Finland	Ella Cecilia Escandón Palacios; Colombia	Maureen Vieira; Aruba	5 finalists awarded titles
1975	Anne Pohtamo; Finland	Gerthie David; Haiti	Summer Bartholomew; United States	Catharina Sjödahl; Sweden	Rose Marie Brosas; Philippines	5 finalists awarded titles
1976	Rina Messinger; Israel	Judith Castillo; Venezuela	Sian Adey-Jones; Wales	Carol Grant; Scotland	Julie Ismay; Australia	5 finalists awarded titles
1977	Janelle Commissiong; Trinidad and Tobago	Eva Düringer; Austria	Sandra Bell; Scotland	Aura María Mojica Salcedo; Colombia	Marie-Luise Gassen; West Germany	5 finalists awarded titles
1978	Margaret Gardiner; South Africa	Judi Andersen; United States	Guillermina Ruiz; Spain	Mary Shirley Sáenz; Colombia	Cecilia Catharina Rhode; Sweden	5 finalists awarded titles
1979	Maritza Sayalero; Venezuela	Gina Swainson; Bermuda	Carolyn Seaward; England	Martha Jussara da Costa; Brazil	Annette Marie Ekström; Sweden	5 finalists awarded titles
1980	Shawn Weatherly; United States	Linda Gallagher; Scotland	Diana Nottle; New Zealand	Rosario Silayan; Philippines	Eva Birgitta Anderson; Sweden	5 finalists awarded titles
1981	Irene Sáez; Venezuela	Dominique Dufour; Canada	Eva-Lena Lundgren; Sweden	Adriana Oliveira; Brazil	Dominique Eeckhoudt; Belgium	5 finalists awarded titles
1982	Karen Baldwin; Canada	Patty Chong Kerkos; Guam	Cinzia Fiordeponti; Italy	Tina Roussou; Greece	Terri Utley; United States	5 finalists awarded titles
1983	Lorraine Downes; New Zealand	Julie Hayek; United States	Roberta Brown; Ireland	Lolita Morena; Switzerland	Karen Moore; England	5 finalists awarded titles
1984	Yvonne Ryding; Sweden	Letitia Snyman; South Africa	Carmen María Montiel; Venezuela	Desiree Verdadero; Philippines	Susana Caldas Lemaitre; Colombia	5 finalists awarded titles
1985	Deborah Carthy-Deu; Puerto Rico	Teresa Sánchez López; Spain	Benita Mureke Tete; Zaire	Silvia Martínez; Venezuela	Andrea López; Uruguay	5 finalists awarded titles
1986	Bárbara Palacios; Venezuela	Christy Fichtner; United States	María Mónica Urbina; Colombia	Brygida Bziukiewicz; Poland	Tuula Polvi; Finland	5 finalists awarded titles
1987	Cecilia Bolocco; Chile	Roberta Capua; Italy	Michelle Royer; United States	Inés María Calero; Venezuela	Laurie Simpson; Puerto Rico	5 finalists awarded titles
1988	Porntip Nakhirunkanok; Thailand	Jang Yoon-jeong; South Korea	Amanda Olivares; Mexico	Mizuho Sakaguchi; Japan	Pauline Yeung; Hong Kong	5 finalists awarded titles
1989	Angela Visser; Holland	Louise Camuto; Sweden	Gretchen Polhemus; United States	Joanna Gapińska; Poland	Adriana Abascal; Mexico	5 finalists awarded titles
1990	Mona Grudt; Norway	Carole Gist; United States	Lizeth Mahecha; Colombia	3 finalists awarded titles		Rosario del Pilar Rico Toro; Bolivia; Uranía Haltenhoff; Chile; Marilé del Rosario Santiago; Mexico
1991	Lupita Jones; Mexico	Pauline Huizinga; Netherlands	Julia Lemigova; Soviet Union	3 finalists awarded titles		Kimberley Mais; Jamaica; Kelli McCarty; United States; Jackeline Rodríguez; Venezuela
1992	Michelle McLean; Namibia	Paola Turbay; Colombia	Madhu Sapre; India	3 finalists awarded titles		Anke Van dermeersch Belgium; Vivian Jansen; Netherlands; Carolina Izsak; Venezuela
1993	Dayanara Torres; Puerto Rico	Paula Andrea Betancur; Colombia	Milka Chulina; Venezuela	3 finalists awarded titles		Yvonne Voni Delfos; Australia; Namrata Shirodkar; India; Kenya Moore; United States
1994	Sushmita Sen; India	Carolina Gómez; Colombia	Minorka Mercado; Venezuela	3 finalists awarded titles		Charlene Gonzales; Philippines; Silvia Lakatošová; Slovakia; Lu Parker; United States
1995	Chelsi Smith; United States	Manpreet Brar; India	Lana Buchberger; Canada	3 finalists awarded titles		Desiree Lowry; Puerto Rico; Arlene Peterkin; Trinidad and Tobago; Denyse Floreano; Venezuela
1996	Alicia Machado; Venezuela	Taryn Mansell; Aruba	Lola Odusoga; Finland	3 finalists awarded titles		Vanessa Guzmán; Mexico; Ilmira Shamsutdinova; Russia; Ali Landry; United States
1997	Brook Lee; United States	Marena Bencomo; Venezuela	Margot Bourgeois; Trinidad and Tobago	3 finalists awarded titles		Verna Vasquez; Curaçao; Denny Méndez; Italy; Lía Borrero; Panama
1998	Wendy Fitzwilliam; Trinidad and Tobago	Veruska Ramírez; Venezuela	Joyce Giraud; Puerto Rico	3 finalists awarded titles		Silvia Fernanda Ortiz; Colombia; Shawnae Jebbia; United States
1999	Mpule Kwelagobe; Botswana	Miriam Quiambao; Philippines	Diana Nogueira; Spain	3 finalists awarded titles		Sonia Raciti; South Africa; Carolina Indriago; Venezuela
2000	Lara Dutta; India	Claudia Moreno; Venezuela	Helen Lindes; Spain	3 finalists awarded titles		Kim Yee; Canada; Lynnette Cole; United States
2001	Denise Quiñones; Puerto Rico	Evelina Papantoniou; Greece	Kandace Krueger; United States	Eva Ekvall; Venezuela	Celina Jaitley; India	5 finalists awarded titles
2002	Oxana Fedorova (Terminated); Russia	Justine Pasek (Assumed) (Note: Pasek originally placed as first runner-up behind original winner Oxana Fedorova of Russia. 119 days after her crowning, Fedorova was terminated. As the first runner-up, Pasek assumed the title of Miss Universe 2002 in her place. The Miss Universe Organization considers Pasek to be the sole titleholder of the Miss Universe 2002 crown.); Panama	Zhuo Ling; China	Vanessa Carreira; South Africa	Cynthia Lander; Venezuela	5 finalists awarded titles
2003	Amelia Vega; Dominican Republic	Mariángel Ruiz; Venezuela	Cindy Nell; South Africa	Sanja Papić; Serbia and Montenegro	Miyako Miyazaki; Japan	5 finalists awarded titles
2004	Jennifer Hawkins; Australia	Shandi Finnessey; United States	Alba Reyes; Puerto Rico	Yanina González; Paraguay	Danielle Jones; Trinidad and Tobago	5 finalists awarded titles
2005	Natalie Glebova; Canada	Cynthia Olavarría; Puerto Rico	Renata Soñé; Dominican Republic	Laura Elizondo; Mexico	Mónica Spear; Venezuela	5 finalists awarded titles
2006	Zuleyka Rivera; Puerto Rico	Kurara Chibana; Japan	Lauriane Gilliéron; Switzerland	Lourdes Arévalos; Paraguay	Tara Conner; United States	5 finalists awarded titles
2007	Riyo Mori; Japan	Natália Guimarães; Brazil	Ly Jonaitis; Venezuela	Honey Lee; South Korea	Rachel Smith; United States	5 finalists awarded titles
2008	Dayana Mendoza; Venezuela	Taliana Vargas; Colombia	Marianne Cruz; Dominican Republic	Vera Krasova; Russia	Elisa Nájera; Mexico	5 finalists awarded titles
2009	Stefanía Fernández; Venezuela	Ada Aimée de la Cruz; Dominican Republic	Marigona Dragusha; Kosovo	Rachael Finch; Australia	Mayra Matos; Puerto Rico	5 finalists awarded titles
2010	Ximena Navarrete; Mexico	Yendi Phillipps; Jamaica	Jesinta Campbell; Australia	Anna Poslavska; Ukraine	Venus Raj; Philippines	5 finalists awarded titles
2011	Leila Lopes; Angola	Olesya Stefanko; Ukraine	Priscila Machado; Brazil	Shamcey Supsup; Philippines	Luo Zilin; China	5 finalists awarded titles
2012	Olivia Culpo; United States	Janine Tugonon; Philippines	Irene Esser; Venezuela	Renae Ayris; Australia	Gabriela Markus; Brazil	5 finalists awarded titles
2013	Gabriela Isler; Venezuela	Patricia Rodríguez; Spain	Constanza Báez; Ecuador	Ariella Arida; Philippines	Jakelyne Oliveira; Brazil	5 finalists awarded titles
2014	Paulina Vega; Colombia	Nia Sanchez; United States	Diana Harkusha; Ukraine	Yasmin Verheijen; Netherlands	Kaci Fennell; Jamaica	5 finalists awarded titles
2015	Pia Wurtzbach; Philippines	Ariadna Gutiérrez (Note: During the live telecast, at first, Gutiérrez was first announced as the winner due to an announcement mistake by Steve Harvey. Once Harvey apologized to the audience, Gutiérrez was announced as the 1st Runner-Up, and Pia Wurtzbach as the winner.); Colombia	Olivia Jordan; United States	3 finalists awarded titles		Monika Radulovic; Australia; Flora Coquerel; France
2016	Iris Mittenaere; France	Raquel Pélissier; Haiti	Andrea Tovar; Colombia	3 finalists awarded titles		Mary Esther Were; Kenya; Maxine Medina; Philippines; Chalita Suansane; Thailand
2017	Demi-Leigh Nel-Peters; South Africa	Laura González; Colombia	Davina Bennett; Jamaica	3 finalists awarded titles		Maria Poonlertlarp; Thailand; Keysi Sayago; Venezuela
2018	Catriona Gray; Philippines	Tamaryn Green; South Africa	Sthefany Gutiérrez; Venezuela	3 finalists awarded titles		Kiara Ortega; Puerto Rico; H'Hen Niê; Vietnam
2019	Zozibini Tunzi; South Africa	Madison Anderson; Puerto Rico	Sofía Aragón; Mexico	3 finalists awarded titles		Gabriela Tafur; Colombia; Paweensuda Drouin; Thailand
2020	Andrea Meza; Mexico	Julia Gama; Brazil	Janick Maceta; Peru	Adline Castelino; India	Kimberly Jiménez; Dominican Republic	5 finalists awarded titles
2021	Harnaaz Sandhu; India	Nadia Ferreira; Paraguay	Lalela Mswane; South Africa	3 finalists awarded titles		Valeria Ayos; Colombia; Beatrice Gomez; Philippines
2022	R'Bonney Gabriel; United States	Amanda Dudamel; Venezuela	Andreína Martínez; Dominican Republic	3 finalists awarded titles		Gabriëla Dos Santos; Curaçao; Ashley Cariño; Puerto Rico
2023	Sheynnis Palacios; Nicaragua	Anntonia Porsild; Thailand	Moraya Wilson; Australia	3 finalists awarded titles		Camila Avella; Colombia; Karla Guilfú; Puerto Rico
2024	Victoria Kjær Theilvig; Denmark	Chidimma Adetshina; Nigeria	María Fernanda Beltrán; Mexico	Suchata Chuangsri (Note: The Miss Universe Organization terminated her from the position of 3rd runner-up of Miss Universe 2024 due to not completing the full one-year term.) (Terminated); Thailand	Ileana Márquez; Venezuela	5 finalists awarded titles
2025	Fátima Bosch; Mexico	Praveenar Singh; Thailand	Stephany Abasali; Venezuela	Ahtisa Manalo; Philippines	Olivia Yacé; Côte d'Ivoire	5 finalists awarded titles

== Runners-up and finalists by country or territory ==
This list includes the runners-up and finalists in Miss Universe by country or territory in ascending order.

=== 1st Runner-Up ===
The First Runner-Up of each edition of Miss Universe is the second placer behind the candidate who is crowned as Miss Universe (first placer). In some cases, she shall take over the title of Miss Universe, if:

- The outgoing titleholder cannot fulfill her duties. This could happen and may result to resignation, giving up the title, or dethronement
- The titleholder is dethroned due to deeds that violate the organization's policies. This has only happened in 2002.

There were instances that the winner is not replaced by the First Runner-Up, when she decides to voluntarily resign from her position, given the formal permission from the organization (1952 and 1974).

The second place finisher being designated as 1st runner-up has been awarded seventy-four times (1952–2025).

This table lists the number of 1st Runner-Up titles by country. There are some special considerations:

- Hawaii competed as an independent territory from 1952 to 1959, before it joined the United States as a member of federation, holding one 1st Runner-Up title on its own.
- The United Kingdom (currently competing under the name of Great Britain) competed separately as England (from 1955 to 1962 and then again from 1964 to 1990), Scotland (from 1961 to 1986 and then again from 1988 to 1990) and Wales (from 1961 to 1990), holding a total of four 1st Runner-Up titles which are counted separately.
- As Panama took over the Miss Universe title in 2002, it is unknown if the 1st Runner-Up position was taken by another candidate after the succession took place.

The current 1st Runner-Up is Praveenar Singh from Thailand, as for the edition that took place on November 21, 2025 in Pak Kret, Nonthaburi, Thailand.

Country/Territory	Titles	Year(s)
United States	9	1953, 1970, 1973, 1978, 1983, 1986, 1990, 2004, 2014
Venezuela	7	1967, 1976, 1997, 1998, 2000, 2003, 2022
Brazil	6	1954, 1957, 1958, 1972, 2007, 2020
Colombia	6	1992, 1993, 1994, 2008, 2015, 2017
Finland	3	1965, 1966, 1969
Thailand	2	2023, 2025
Puerto Rico	2	2005, 2019
South Africa	2	1984, 2018
Haiti	2	1975, 2016
Spain	2	1985, 2013
Philippines	2	1999, 2012
Italy	2	1960, 1987
Wales	2	1961, 1974
Nigeria	1	2024
Paraguay	1	2021
Ukraine	1	2011
Jamaica	1	2010
Dominican Republic	1	2009
Japan	1	2006
Greece	1	2001
Aruba	1	1996
India	1	1995
Netherlands	1	1991
Sweden	1	1989
South Korea	1	1988
Guam	1	1982
Canada	1	1981
Scotland	1	1980
Bermuda	1	1979
Austria	1	1977
Australia	1	1971
Curaçao	1	1968
England	1	1964
Denmark	1	1963
Iceland	1	1962
Norway	1	1959
Germany	1	1956
El Salvador	1	1955
Hawaii	1	1952

Assumed wins

Titles assumed following resignations.

Country or territory	Titles	Year(s)
Panama	1	2002

=== 2nd Runner-Up ===
The Second Runner-Up of each edition of Miss Universe is the third placer behind the candidate who is crowned as Miss Universe (first placer) and the first Runner-Up (second placer). Although it has never happened, the second Runner-Up is supposed to take over the Miss Universe title if both the original winner and the first Runner-Up are unable to fulfill their duties/resign their titles. For example, if a Miss Universe winner is required to give up her title and the Firsr Runner-Up is unable/does not want to assume the winner's position, the title then passes to the second Runner-Up.

The third place finisher being designated as 2nd runner-up has been awarded seventy-four times (1952–2025).

This table lists the number of 2nd Runner-Up titles by country. There are some special considerations as well:

- Hawaii competed as an independent territory from 1952 to 1959, before it joined the United States as member of Federation, holding one 2nd Runner-Up title on its own.
- The United Kingdom (currently competing under the name of Great Britain) competed separately as England (from 1955 to 1962 and then again from 1964 to 1990), Scotland (from 1961 to 1986 and then again from 1988 to 1990) and Wales (from 1961 to 1990), holding a total of five 2nd Runner-Up titles which are counted separately.
- It is unknown if Zhuo Ling, Miss Universe 2002 second Runner-Up, took over the First Runner-Up position after Justine Pasek took over the winner's place, as no official statements regarding this matter were made by the organization.

The current 2nd Runner-Up is Stephany Abasali from Venezuela, as for the edition that took place on November 21, 2025 in Pak Kret, Nonthaburi, Thailand.

Country/Territory	Titles	Year(s)
Venezuela	8	1972, 1984, 1993, 1994, 2007, 2012, 2018, 2025
United States	7	1959, 1965, 1975, 1987, 1989, 2001, 2015
Finland	5	1962, 1968, 1971, 1974, 1996
Australia	4	1969, 1970, 2010, 2023
Mexico	3	1988, 2019, 2024
Dominican Republic	3	2005, 2008, 2022
Colombia	3	1986, 1990, 2016
Spain	3	1978, 1999, 2000
England	3	1957, 1967, 1979
South Africa	2	2003, 2021
Puerto Rico	2	1998, 2004
Ireland	2	1963, 1983
Sweden	2	1956, 1981
Peru	1	2020
Jamaica	1	2017
Ukraine	1	2014
Ecuador	1	2013
Brazil	1	2011
Kosovo	1	2009
Switzerland	1	2006
China	1	2002
Trinidad and Tobago	1	1997
Canada	1	1995
India	1	1992
Soviet Union^{[C]}	1	1991
Zaire^{[B]}	1	1985
Italy	1	1982
New Zealand	1	1980
Scotland	1	1977
Wales	1	1976
Norway	1	1973
Thailand	1	1966
Israel	1	1964
Argentina	1	1961
Austria	1	1960
Hawaii	1	1958
Ceylon^{[A]}	1	1955
Hong Kong	1	1954
Japan	1	1953
Greece	1	1952

Notes
^{A} Now known as Sri Lanka
^{B} Now known as DR Congo
^{C} The results of Miss USSR were inherited by Miss Russia.

=== 3rd Runner-Up ===
The Third Runner-Up of each edition of Miss Universe is the fourth placer behind the candidate who is crowned as Miss Universe (first placer), the First Runner-Up (second placer) and the Second Runner-Up (third placer).

The fourth place finisher being designated as 3rd runner-up has been awarded fifty-five times (1952–1989; 2001–2014; 2020; 2024–2025).

The current 3rd Runner-Up is Ahtisa Manalo from the Philippines, as for the edition that took place on November 21, 2025 in Pak Kret, Nonthaburi, Thailand.

Country/Territory	Titles	Year(s)
Philippines	6	1963, 1980, 1984, 2011, 2013, 2025
Venezuela	4	1968, 1985, 1987, 2001
Colombia	3	1974, 1977, 1978
Sweden	3	1964, 1965, 1975
England	3	1956, 1959, 1961
India	2	1966, 2020
Australia	2	2009, 2012
Paraguay	2	2004, 2006
Mexico	2	1953, 2005
South Africa	2	1960, 2002
Poland	2	1986, 1989
Japan	2	1970, 1988
Brazil	2	1979, 1981
Israel	2	1969, 1972
Germany	2	1954, 1955
Netherlands	1	2014
Ukraine	1	2010
Russia	1	2008
South Korea	1	2007
Serbia and Montenegro	1	2003
Switzerland	1	1983
Greece	1	1982
Scotland	1	1976
Spain	1	1973
Puerto Rico	1	1971
Finland	1	1967
Taiwan	1	1962
United States	1	1958
Cuba	1	1957
Hong Kong	1	1952

Terminated position

Country or territory	Titles	Year(s)
Thailand	1	2024

=== 4th Runner-Up ===
The Fourth Runner-Up of each edition of Miss Universe is the fifth placer behind the candidate who is crowned as Miss Universe (first placer), the First Runner-Up (second placer), the Second Runner-Up (third placer) and the Third Runner-Up (fourth placer).

The fifth place finisher being designated as 4th runner-up has been awarded fifty-five times (1952–1989; 2001–2014; 2020; 2024–2025).

The current 4th Runner-Up is Olivia Yacé from Côte d'Ivoire, as for the edition that took place on November 21, 2025 in Pak Kret, Nonthaburi, Thailand.

Country/Territory	Titles	Year(s)
Brazil	5	1959, 1962, 1971, 2012, 2013
United States	5	1961, 1968, 1982, 2006, 2007
Sweden	4	1954, 1978, 1979, 1980
Venezuela	3	2002, 2005, 2024
Japan	3	1955, 1969, 2003
Germany	3	1952, 1957, 1977
Israel	3	1966, 1967, 1973
Philippines	2	1975, 2010
Puerto Rico	2	1987, 2009
Mexico	2	1989, 2008
England	2	1972, 1983
Australia	2	1953, 1976
Côte d'Ivoire	1	2025
Dominican Republic	1	2020
Jamaica	1	2014
China	1	2011
Trinidad and Tobago	1	2004
India	1	2001
Hong Kong	1	1988
Finland	1	1986
Uruguay	1	1985
Colombia	1	1984
Belgium	1	1981
Aruba	1	1974
Argentina	1	1970
Netherlands	1	1965
Taiwan	1	1964
South Korea	1	1963
Spain	1	1960
Poland	1	1958
Italy	1	1956

=== Top 5 or Top 6 ===
The Third and Fourth Runners-Up of each edition of Miss Universe are the fourth and fifth placers behind the candidate who is crowned as Miss Universe (first placer), the First Runner-Up (second placer), and the Second Runner-Up (third placer).

However, several editions of the pageant have only awarded titles to the first, second, and third placers, and do not officially have a third and fourth runner-up awardee, as the finalists who would have receive these titles finished with a Top 5 or Top 6 placement instead.

The fourth and fifth place finisher being designated as Top 5 or Top 6 placements and not as 3rd and 4th runners-up has been awarded nineteen times to forty-seven finalists (1990–2000; 2015–2019; 2021–2023).

The last Top 5/Top 6 placements are Camila Avella from Colombia and Karla Guilfú from Puerto Rico, as for the edition that took place on November 18, 2023 in San Salvador, El Salvador.

Country/Territory	Titles	Year(s)
United States	6	1991, 1993, 1994, 1996, 1998, 2000
Venezuela	5	1991, 1992, 1995, 1999, 2017
Colombia	4	1998, 2019, 2021, 2023
Puerto Rico	4	1995, 2018, 2022, 2023
Philippines	3	1994, 2016, 2021
Thailand	3	2016, 2017, 2019
Australia	2	1993, 2015
Mexico	2	1990, 1996
Curaçao	2	1997, 2022
Kenya	1	2016
France	1	2015
Canada	1	2000
South Africa	1	1999
Italy	1	1997
Panama	1	1997
Russia	1	1996
Trinidad and Tobago	1	1995
Slovakia	1	1994
India	1	1993
Belgium	1	1992
Netherlands	1	1992
Jamaica	1	1991
Bolivia	1	1990
Chile	1	1990

== Titleholders, runners-up, and finalists all-time ranking placement ==
This list includes the placement positions of winners, runners-up, and finalists in Miss Universe by country or territory in ascending order.

Country or territory	Total	Miss Universe (1st Place)	1st Runner-Up (2nd Place)	2nd Runner-Up (3rd Place)	3rd Runner-Up (4th Place)	4th Runner-Up (5th Place)	Top 5/6 (4th, 5th, or 6th Place)
United States	37	9 (1954, 1956, 1960, 1967, 1980, 1995, 1997, 2012, 2022)	9 (1953, 1970, 1973, 1978, 1983, 1986, 1990, 2004, 2014)	7 (1959, 1965, 1975, 1987, 1989, 2001, 2015)	1 (1958)	5 (1961, 1968, 1982, 2006, 2007)	6 (1991, 1993, 1994, 1996, 1998, 2000)
Venezuela	34	7 (1979, 1981, 1986, 1996, 2008, 2009, 2013)	7 (1967, 1976, 1997, 1998, 2000, 2003, 2022)	8 (1972, 1984, 1993, 1994, 2007, 2012, 2018, 2025)	4 (1968, 1985, 1987, 2001)	3 (2002, 2005, 2024)	5 (1991, 1992, 1995, 1999, 2017)
Puerto Rico	16	5 (1970, 1985, 1993, 2001, 2006)	2 (2005, 2019)	2 (1998, 2004)	1 (1971)	2 (1987, 2009)	4 (1995, 2018, 2022, 2023)
Philippines	17	4 (1969, 1973, 2015, 2018)	2 (1999, 2012)	×	6 (1963, 1980, 1984, 2011, 2013, 2025)	2 (1975, 2010)	3 (1994, 2016, 2021)
Mexico	13	4 (1991, 2010, 2020, 2025)	×	3 (1988, 2019, 2024)	2 (1953, 2005)	2 (1989, 2008)	2 (1990, 1996)
South Africa	10	3 (1978, 2017, 2019)	2 (1984, 2018)	2 (2003, 2021)	2 (1960, 2002)	×	1 (1999)
Sweden	13	3 (1955, 1966, 1984)	1 (1989)	2 (1956, 1981)	3 (1964, 1965, 1975)	4 (1954, 1978, 1979, 1980)	×
India	9	3 (1994, 2000, 2021)	1 (1995)	1 (1992)	2 (1966, 2020)	1 (2001)	1 (1993)
Colombia	19	2 (1958, 2014)	6 (1992, 1993, 1994, 2008, 2015, 2017)	3 (1986, 1990, 2016)	3 (1974, 1977, 1978)	1 (1984)	4 (1998, 2019, 2021, 2023)
Brazil	16	2 (1963, 1968)	6 (1954, 1957, 1958, 1972, 2007, 2020)	1 (2011)	2 (1979, 1981)	5 (1959, 1962, 1971, 2012, 2013)	×
Finland	12	2 (1952, 1975)	3 (1965, 1966, 1969)	5 (1962, 1968, 1971, 1974, 1996)	1 (1967)	1 (1986)	×
Thailand	9	2 (1965, 1988)	2 (2023, 2025)	1 (1966)	× (~~2024~~ (Note: Despite the termination of the Miss Universe title or other position, statistically the placement is taken into account.))	×	3 (2016, 2017, 2019)
Australia	13	2 (1972, 2004)	1 (1971)	4 (1969, 1970, 2010, 2023)	2 (2009, 2012)	2 (1953, 1976)	2 (1993, 2015)
Japan	9	2 (1959, 2007)	1 (2006)	1 (1953)	2 (1970, 1988)	3 (1955, 1969, 2003)	×
Canada	5	2 (1982, 2005)	1 (1981)	1 (1995)	×	×	1 (2000)
Trinidad and Tobago	5	2 (1977, 1998)	×	1 (1997)	×	1 (2004)	1 (1995)
France	3	2 (1953, 2016)	×	×	×	×	1 (2015)
Spain	8	1 (1974)	2 (1985, 2013)	3 (1978, 1999, 2000)	1 (1973)	1 (1960)	×
Dominican Republic	6	1 (2003)	1 (2009)	3 (2005, 2008, 2022)	×	1 (2020)	×
Greece	4	1 (1964)	1 (2001)	1 (1952)	1 (1982)	×	×
Norway	3	1 (1990)	1 (1959)	1 (1973)	×	×	×
Germany	7	1 (1961)	1 (1956)	×	2 (1954, 1955)	3 (1952, 1957, 1977)	×
Netherlands	5	1 (1989)	1 (1991)	×	1 (2014)	1 (1965)	1 (1992)
Denmark	2	1 (2024)	1 (1963)	×	×	×	×
Israel	7	1 (1976)	×	1 (1964)	2 (1969, 1972)	3 (1966, 1967, 1973)	×
Argentina	3	1 (1962)	×	1 (1961)	×	1 (1970)	×
Peru	2	1 (1957)	×	1 (2020)	×	×	×
New Zealand	2	1 (1983)	×	1 (1980)	×	×	×
Panama	2	1 (**2002**)	× (~~2002~~)	×	×	×	1 (1997)
Chile	2	1 (1987)	×	×	×	×	1 (1990)
Nicaragua	1	1 (2023)	×	×	×	×	×
Angola	1	1 (2011)	×	×	×	×	×
Botswana	1	1 (1999)	×	×	×	×	×
Namibia	1	1 (1992)	×	×	×	×	×
Lebanon	1	1 (1971)	×	×	×	×	×
Italy	5	×	2 (1960, 1987)	1 (1982)	×	1 (1956)	1 (1997)
Wales	3	×	2 (1961, 1974)	1 (1976)	×	×	×
Haiti	2	×	2 (1975, 2016)	×	×	×	×
England	9	×	1 (1964)	3 (1957, 1967, 1979)	3 (1956, 1959, 1961)	2 (1972, 1983)	×
Ukraine	3	×	1 (2011)	1 (2014)	1 (2010)	×	×
Scotland	3	×	1 (1980)	1 (1977)	1 (1976)	×	×
Jamaica	4	×	1 (2010)	1 (2017)	×	1 (2014)	1 (1991)
Austria	2	×	1 (1977)	1 (1960)	×	×	×
Hawaii	2	×	1 (1952)	1 (1958)	×	×	×
Paraguay	3	×	1 (2021)	×	2 (2004, 2006)	×	×
South Korea	3	×	1 (1988)	×	1 (2007)	1 (1963)	×
Curaçao	3	×	1 (1968)	×	×	×	2 (1997, 2022)
Aruba	2	×	1 (1996)	×	×	1 (1974)	×
Nigeria	1	×	1 (2024)	×	×	×	×
Guam	1	×	1 (1982)	×	×	×	×
Bermuda	1	×	1 (1979)	×	×	×	×
Iceland	1	×	1 (1962)	×	×	×	×
El Salvador	1	×	1 (1955)	×	×	×	×
Ireland	2	×	×	2 (1963, 1983)	×	×	×
Hong Kong	3	×	×	1 (1954)	1 (1952)	1 (1988)	×
Switzerland	2	×	×	1 (2006)	1 (1983)	×	×
China	2	×	×	1 (2002)	×	1 (2011)	×
Ecuador	1	×	×	1 (2013)	×	×	×
Kosovo	1	×	×	1 (2009)	×	×	×
Soviet Union	1	×	×	1 (1991)	×	×	×
Democratic Republic of the Congo	1	×	×	1 (1985)	×	×	×
Sri Lanka	1	×	×	1 (1955)	×	×	×
Poland	3	×	×	×	2 (1986, 1989)	1 (1958)	×
Taiwan	2	×	×	×	1 (1962)	1 (1964)	×
Russia	3	× (~~2002~~)	×	×	1 (2008)	×	1 (1996)
Serbia and Montenegro	1	×	×	×	1 (2003)	×	×
Cuba	1	×	×	×	1 (1957)	×	×
Côte d'Ivoire	1	×	×	×	×	1 (2025)	×
Uruguay	1	×	×	×	×	1 (1985)	×
Belgium	2	×	×	×	×	1 (1981)	1 (1992)
Vietnam	1	×	×	×	×	×	1 (2018)
Kenya	1	×	×	×	×	×	1 (2016)
Slovakia	1	×	×	×	×	×	1 (1994)
Bolivia	1	×	×	×	×	×	1 (1990)
Total	**379**	74	74	74	55	55	47

The country/territory who assumed a position is indicated in bold
The country/territory who was dethroned, resigned or originally held the position is indicated in striketrough
The country/territory who was dethroned, resigned or originally held the position but was not replaced is indicated underlined

== Titleholders, runners-up, finalists, and semifinalists all-time ranking placement ==
This list includes all placement positions (winners, runners-up, finalists, and semifinalists) in Miss Universe by country or territory in ascending order.

Country or territory	Total	MU	Runners-Up				Top										
Country or territory	Total	MU	1st	2nd	3rd	4th	5	6	9	10	12	13	15	16	20	21	30
United States	68	9 (1954, 1956, 1960, 1967, 1980, 1995, 1997, 2012, 2022)	9 (1953, 1970, 1973, 1978, 1983, 1986, 1990, 2004, 2014)	7 (1959, 1965, 1975, 1987, 1989, 2001, 2015)	1 (1958)	5 (1961, 1968, 1982, 2006, 2007)	2 (1998, 2000)	4 (1991, 1993, 1994, 1996)	1 (2016)	12 (1952, 1984, 1985, 1988, 1992, 2005, 2008, 2009, 2013, 2017, 2019, 2021)	6 (1971, 1972, 1974, 1977, 1979, 1981)	×	7 (1955, 1962, 1963, 1964, 1966, 1969, 2003)	1 (2011)	2 (2018, 2023)	1 (2020)	1 (2025)
Venezuela	49	7 (1979, 1981, 1986, 1996, 2008, 2009, 2013)	7 (1967, 1976, 1997, 1998, 2000, 2003, 2022)	8 (1972, 1984, 1993, 1994, 2007, 2012, 2018, 2025)	4 (1968, 1985, 1987, 2001)	3 (2002, 2005, 2024)	2 (1999, 2017)	3 (1991, 1992, 1995)	×	6 (1988, 1989, 1990, 2014, 2015, 2023)	2 (1977, 1983)	×	4 (1955, 1956, 1964, 1970)	2 (2011, 2021)	1 (2019)	×	×
Puerto Rico	28	5 (1970, 1985, 1993, 2001, 2006)	2 (2005, 2019)	2 (1998, 2004)	1 (1971)	2 (1987, 2009)	3 (2018, 2022, 2023)	1 (1995)	×	6 (1986, 1997, 1999, 2010, 2020, 2021)	4 (1974, 1980, 2024, 2025)	×	×	2 (2011, 2013)	×	×	×
Philippines	29	4 (1969, 1973, 2015, 2018)	2 (1999, 2012)	×	6 (1963, 1980, 1984, 2011, 2013, 2025)	2 (1975, 2010)	1 (2021)	2 (1994, 2016)	×	4 (1987, 2014, 2017, 2023)	2 (1972, 1974)	×	2 (1965, 1966)	1 (1954)	1 (2019)	1 (2020)	1 (2024)
Mexico	23	4 (1991, 2010, 2020, 2025)	×	3 (1988, 2019, 2024)	2 (1953, 2005)	2 (1989, 2008)	×	2 (1990, 1996)	1 (2016)	5 (1952, 1999, 2006, 2007, 2012)	1 (1978)	×	3 (1956, 2004, 2015)	×	×	×	×
South Africa	27	3 (1978, 2017, 2019)	2 (1984, 2018)	2 (2003, 2021)	2 (1960, 2002)	×	1 (1999)	×	×	7 (1952, 1995, 1998, 2000, 2009, 2010, 2012)	2 (1979, 1982)	×	5 (1963, 1965, 2005, 2008, 2015)	2 (1953, 2022)	1 (2023)	×	×
Sweden	29	3 (1955, 1966, 1984)	1 (1989)	2 (1956, 1981)	3 (1964, 1965, 1975)	4 (1954, 1978, 1979, 1980)	×	×	×	6 (1952, 1987, 1992, 1994, 1996, 1997)	×	×	9 (1957, 1958, 1959, 1961, 1967, 1968, 1969, 1970, 2009)	×	1 (2006)	×	×
India	29	3 (1994, 2000, 2021)	1 (1995)	1 (1992)	2 (1966, 2020)	1 (2001)	×	1 (1993)	×	9 (1990, 1996, 1997, 1998, 1999, 2002, 2004, 2007, 2013)	3 (1972, 1973, 1974)	×	1 (2014)	2 (2012, 2022)	3 (2006, 2019, 2023)	×	2 (2024, 2025)
Colombia	40	2 (1958, 2014)	6 (1992, 1993, 1994, 2008, 2015, 2017)	3 (1986, 1990, 2016)	3 (1974, 1977, 1978)	1 (1984)	4 (1998, 2019, 2021, 2023)	×	×	5 (1988, 1995, 2000, 2004, 2006)	5 (1973, 1975, 1976, 1980, 2025)	×	8 (1959, 1960, 1962, 1963, 1965, 1966, 1969, 2010)	2 (2011, 2022)	×	1 (2020)	×
Brazil	40	2 (1963, 1968)	6 (1954, 1957, 1958, 1972, 2007, 2020)	1 (2011)	2 (1979, 1981)	5 (1959, 1962, 1971, 2012, 2013)	×	×	×	6 (1985, 1986, 1993, 1998, 2003, 2017)	3 (1973, 1975, 1982)	1 (2016)	10 (1955, 1956, 1960, 1964, 1965, 1967, 1969, 1970, 2014, 2015)	×	3 (2006, 2018, 2019)	×	1 (2025)
Finland	19	2 (1952, 1975)	3 (1965, 1966, 1969)	5 (1962, 1968, 1971, 1974, 1996)	1 (1967)	1 (1986)	×	×	×	3 (1964, 1989, 1993)	2 (1982, 1983)	×	1 (1963)	×	×	×	1 (2024)
Thailand	16	2 (1965, 1988)	2 (2023, 2025)	1 (1966)	× (~~2024~~ (Note: Despite the termination of the Miss Universe title or other position, statistically the placement is taken into account.))	×	2 (2017, 2019)	1 (2016)	×	4 (1984, 2015, 2018, 2020)	×	×	2 (1968, 2007)	×	1 (2006)	×	×
Australia	22	2 (1972, 2004)	1 (1971)	4 (1969, 1970, 2010, 2023)	2 (2009, 2012)	2 (1953, 1976)	1 (2015)	1 (1993)	×	5 (1992, 2008, 2011, 2014, 2020)	1 (1974)	×	1 (1965)	1 (2022)	1 (2018)	×	×
Japan	22	2 (1959, 2007)	1 (2006)	1 (1953)	2 (1970, 1988)	3 (1955, 1969, 2003)	×	×	×	1 (2015)	4 (1971, 1972, 1973, 1975)	×	5 (1957, 1958, 1960, 1963, 2008)	1 (2021)	×	×	2 (2024, 2025)
Canada	22	2 (1982, 2005)	1 (1981)	1 (1995)	×	×	1 (2000)	×	1 (2016)	6 (1985, 2002, 2003, 2006, 2017, 2018)	2 (1980, 2024)	×	5 (1955, 1957, 1962, 1965, 1968)	2 (1953, 2022)	×	×	1 (2025)
Trinidad and Tobago	9	2 (1977, 1998)	×	1 (1997)	×	1 (2004)	×	1 (1995)	×	2 (2003, 2006)	×	×	1 (2005)	1 (2022)	×	×	×
France	24	2 (1953, 2016)	×	×	×	×	1 (2015)	×	×	9 (1964, 1991, 2000, 2001, 2009, 2011, 2012, 2019, 2021)	1 (1971)	×	7 (1956, 1959, 1961, 1963, 1968, 2010, 2014)	1 (1954)	×	1 (2020)	2 (2024, 2025)
Spain	20	1 (1974)	2 (1985, 2013)	3 (1978, 1999, 2000)	1 (1973)	1 (1960)	×	×	×	6 (1993, 2001, 2008, 2014, 2017, 2023)	3 (1971, 1977, 1983)	×	2 (1966, 1967)	1 (2022)	×	×	×
Dominican Republic	14	1 (2003)	1 (2009)	3 (2005, 2008, 2022)	×	1 (2020)	×	×	×	4 (1988, 1995, 2013, 2015)	1 (1977)	×	×	×	1 (2019)	×	2 (2024, 2025)
Greece	18	1 (1964)	1 (2001)	1 (1952)	1 (1982)	×	×	×	×	1 (1994)	1 (1973)	×	11 (1956, 1957, 1958, 1959, 1960, 1965, 1967, 1968, 1970, 2003, 2005)	1 (1954)	×	×	×
Norway	17	1 (1990)	1 (1959)	1 (1973)	×	×	×	×	×	2 (1964, 1988)	3 (1976, 1981, 1983)	×	7 (1955, 1960, 1966, 1968, 1969, 2004, 2005)	2 (1953, 1954)	×	×	×
Germany	21	1 (1961)	1 (1956)	×	2 (1954, 1955)	3 (1952, 1957, 1977)	×	×	×	3 (1984, 1989, 2002)	5 (1972, 1979, 1981, 1982, 1983)	×	5 (1958, 1959, 1960, 1963, 1966)	1 (1953)	×	×	×
Netherlands	14	1 (1989)	1 (1991)	×	1 (2014)	1 (1965)	×	1 (1992)	×	1 (1984)	3 (1977, 1978, 1981)	×	3 (1958, 1966, 1967)	1 (2011)	×	×	1 (2025)
Denmark	9	1 (2024)	1 (1963)	×	×	×	×	×	×	×	×	×	5 (1958, 1965, 1966, 1967, 2007)	1 (1953)	1 (2006)	×	×
Israel	20	1 (1976)	×	1 (1964)	2 (1969, 1972)	3 (1966, 1967, 1973)	×	×	×	2 (2001, 2005)	3 (1971, 1975, 1978)	×	8 (1956, 1958, 1959, 1960, 1961, 1962, 1965, 1968)	×	×	×	×
Argentina	17	1 (1962)	×	1 (1961)	×	1 (1970)	×	×	×	2 (1964, 2014)	5 (1973, 1976, 1977, 1979, 2024)	×	4 (1955, 1956, 1957, 1963)	1 (1954)	1 (2006)	1 (2020)	×
Peru	23	1 (1957)	×	1 (2020)	×	×	×	×	×	5 (1987, 1996, 2005, 2019, 2023)	4 (1972, 1978, 1982, 2024)	1 (2016)	7 (1956, 1958, 1961, 1965, 1966, 1969, 2003)	4 (1953, 1954, 2012, 2022)	×	×	×
New Zealand	5	1 (1983)	×	1 (1980)	×	×	×	×	×	1 (1992)	1 (1981)	×	1 (1962)	×	×	×	×
Chile	16	1 (1987)	×	×	×	×	×	1 (1990)	×	3 (1985, 1986, 1989)	4 (1976, 1978, 2024, 2025)	×	5 (1958, 1961, 1968, 1969, 2004)	1 (1954)	1 (2023)	×	×
Panama	10	1 (2002)	× (~~2002~~)	×	×	×	×	1 (1997)	×	1 (2011)	2 (1974, 1980)	1 (2016)	1 (2003)	3 (1953, 1954, 2021)	×	×	×
Nicaragua	7	1 (2023)	×	×	×	×	×	×	×	1 (2007)	1 (1977)	×	×	1 (2013)	×	1 (2020)	2 (2024, 2025)
Angola	4	1 (2011)	×	×	×	×	×	×	×	1 (2007)	×	×	2 (2003, 2004)	×	×	×	×
Namibia	3	1 (1992)	×	×	×	×	×	×	×	1 (2003)	×	×	×	×	1 (2023)	×	×
Lebanon	3	1 (1971)	×	×	×	×	×	×	×	×	1 (1973)	×	1 (1962)	×	×	×	×
Botswana	1	1 (1999)	×	×	×	×	×	×	×	×	×	×	×	×	×	×	×
Italy	16	×	2 (1960, 1987)	1 (1982)	×	1 (1956)	×	1 (1997)	×	3 (1964, 1994, 2008)	1 (1983)	×	5 (1957, 1963, 1967, 1970, 2014)	2 (1953, 1954)	×	×	×
Wales	5	×	2 (1961, 1974)	1 (1976)	×	×	×	×	×	×	1 (1979)	×	1 (1967)	×	×	×	×
Haiti	4	×	2 (1975, 2016)	×	×	×	×	×	×	×	×	×	1 (1962)	1 (2022)	×	×	×
England	19	×	1 (1964)	3 (1957, 1967, 1979)	3 (1956, 1959, 1961)	2 (1972, 1983)	×	×	×	×	5 (1971, 1974, 1975, 1976, 1982)	×	5 (1955, 1960, 1962, 1966, 1968)	×	×	×	×
Ukraine	6	×	1 (2011)	1 (2014)	1 (2010)	×	×	×	×	1 (2013)	×	×	1 (2007)	×	1 (2006)	×	×
Scotland	5	×	1 (1980)	1 (1977)	1 (1976)	×	×	×	×	×	1 (1979)	×	1 (1961)	×	×	×	×
Jamaica	10	×	1 (2010)	1 (2017)	×	1 (2014)	×	1 (1991)	×	4 (1989, 1999, 2004, 2020)	×	×	×	×	2 (2018, 2023)	×	×
Austria	7	×	1 (1977)	1 (1960)	×	×	×	×	×	×	×	×	4 (1957, 1962, 1963, 1969)	1 (1953)	×	×	×
Hawaii	2	×	1 (1952)	1 (1958)	×	×	×	×	×	×	×	×	×	×	×	×	×
Paraguay	6	×	1 (2021)	×	2 (2004, 2006)	×	×	×	×	1 (1991)	×	×	1 (1964)	×	×	×	1 (2025)
South Korea	8	×	1 (1988)	×	1 (2007)	1 (1963)	×	×	×	×	1 (1980)	×	4 (1959, 1960, 1961, 1962)	×	×	×	×
Aruba	4	×	1 (1996)	×	×	1 (1974)	×	×	×	1 (2021)	×	×	×	×	×	×	1 (2024)
Curaçao	8	×	1 (1968)	×	×	×	1 (2022)	1 (1997)	×	3 (1991, 2015, 2018)	1 (1976)	×	×	×	×	1 (2020)	×
El Salvador	5	×	1 (1955)	×	×	×	×	×	×	3 (1995, 1996, 2023)	1 (1975)	×	×	×	×	×	×
Iceland	6	×	1 (1962)	×	×	×	×	×	×	1 (2019)	1 (1980)	×	3 (1959, 1961, 2009)	×	×	×	×
Nigeria	3	×	1 (2024)	×	×	×	×	×	×	1 (2001)	×	×	×	×	1 (2019)	×	×
Guam	2	×	1 (1982)	×	×	×	×	×	×	×	×	×	1 (1970)	×	×	×	×
Bermuda	1	×	1 (1979)	×	×	×	×	×	×	×	×	×	×	×	×	×	×
Ireland	10	×	×	2 (1963, 1983)	×	×	×	×	×	3 (1985, 1998, 2010)	2 (1975, 1978)	×	1 (1967)	1 (2017)	1 (2018)	×	×
Hong Kong	6	×	×	1 (1954)	1 (1952)	1 (1988)	×	×	×	×	1 (1976)	×	2 (1967, 1970)	×	×	×	×
Switzerland	12	×	×	1 (2006)	1 (1983)	×	×	×	×	4 (1986, 1994, 2005, 2009)	×	×	5 (1960, 1961, 1969, 1970, 2004)	1 (2013)	×	×	×
China	6	×	×	1 (2002)	×	1 (2011)	×	×	×	×	1 (2025)	×	×	2 (2013, 2017)	×	×	1 (2024)
Ecuador	4	×	×	1 (2013)	×	×	×	×	×	1 (2004)	1 (1981)	×	×	×	×	×	1 (2024)
Kosovo	4	×	×	1 (2009)	×	×	×	×	×	1 (2008)	×	×	×	2 (2011, 2012)	×	×	×
Democratic Republic of the Congo	2	×	×	1 (1985)	×	×	×	×	×	1 (1986)	×	×	×	×	×	×	×
Sri Lanka	2	×	×	1 (1955)	×	×	×	×	×	×	×	×	×	1 (2017)	×	×	×
Soviet Union	1	×	×	1 (1991)	×	×	×	×	×	×	×	×	×	×	×	×	×
Poland	6	×	×	×	2 (1986, 1989)	1 (1958)	×	×	×	×	×	×	1 (1959)	1 (2012)	1 (2018)	×	×
Taiwan	3	×	×	×	1 (1962)	1 (1964)	×	×	×	×	×	×	1 (1961)	×	×	×	×
Russia	9	× (~~2002~~)	×	×	1 (2008)	×	×	1 (1996)	×	3 (1998, 2001, 2012)	1 (2024)	×	1 (2010)	×	1 (2006)	×	×
Cuba	4	×	×	×	1 (1957)	×	×	×	×	×	1 (2025)	×	1 (1956)	×	×	×	1 (2024)
Serbia and Montenegro	1	×	×	×	1 (2003)	×	×	×	×	×	×	×	×	×	×	×	×
Belgium	11	×	×	×	×	1 (1981)	×	1 (1992)	×	×	2 (1972, 1978)	×	6 (1955, 1956, 1959, 2009, 2010, 2015)	×	1 (2018)	×	×
Uruguay	6	×	×	×	×	1 (1985)	×	×	×	1 (1952)	1 (1982)	×	1 (1957)	2 (1953, 1954)	×	×	×
Côte d'Ivoire	1	×	×	×	×	1 (2025)	×	×	×	×	×	×	×	×	×	×	×
Vietnam	6	×	×	×	×	×	1 (2018)	×	×	×	×	×	1 (2008)	1 (2021)	1 (2019)	1 (2020)	1 (2024)
Bolivia	4	×	×	×	×	×	×	1 (1990)	×	1 (2006)	1 (2024)	×	1 (1964)	×	×	×	×
Kenya	1	×	×	×	×	×	×	1 (2016)	×	×	×	×	×	×	×	×	×
Slovakia	1	×	×	×	×	×	×	1 (1994)	×	×	×	×	×	×	×	×	×
Costa Rica	7	×	×	×	×	×	×	×	×	4 (2004, 2011, 2018, 2020)	×	×	×	2 (1954, 2013)	×	×	1 (2025)
Czech Republic	6	×	×	×	×	×	×	×	×	3 (1993, 2003, 2009)	×	×	3 (2007, 2008, 2010)	×	×	×	×
Albania	4	×	×	×	×	×	×	×	×	2 (2002, 2010)	×	×	1 (2009)	×	1 (2019)	×	×
Guatemala	4	×	×	×	×	×	×	×	×	2 (1984, 2010)	×	×	1 (1955)	×	×	×	1 (2025)
Estonia	2	×	×	×	×	×	×	×	×	2 (1997, 2000)	×	×	×	×	×	×	×
Singapore	3	×	×	×	×	×	×	×	×	1 (1987)	1 (1983)	×	×	1 (2021)	×	×	×
Indonesia	8	×	×	×	×	×	×	×	×	1 (2019)	×	1 (2016)	3 (2005, 2014, 2015)	1 (2013)	1 (2018)	1 (2020)	×
Yugoslavia	3	×	×	×	×	×	×	×	×	1 (1991)	×	×	2 (1968, 1969)	×	×	×	×
Hungary	4	×	×	×	×	×	×	×	×	1 (2012)	×	×	1 (2008)	×	2 (2006, 2018)	×	×
Czechoslovakia	2	×	×	×	×	×	×	×	×	1 (1990)	×	×	1 (1970)	×	×	×	×
Great Britain	5	×	×	×	×	×	×	×	×	1 (2013)	×	×	×	2 (2017, 2021)	1 (2018)	1 (2020)	×
Turkey	3	×	×	×	×	×	×	×	×	1 (1990)	×	×	×	2 (1953, 2012)	×	×	×
Portugal	4	×	×	×	×	×	×	×	×	1 (2011)	×	×	×	1 (2022)	2 (2019, 2023)	×	×
Ghana	2	×	×	×	×	×	×	×	×	1 (1999)	×	×	×	1 (2017)	×	×	×
Nepal	2	×	×	×	×	×	×	×	×	1 (2018)	×	×	×	×	1 (2023)	×	×
Zimbabwe	3	×	×	×	×	×	×	×	×	1 (2000)	×	×	×	×	×	×	2 (2024, 2025)
Bahamas	1	×	×	×	×	×	×	×	×	1 (2021)	×	×	×	×	×	×	×
Tanzania	1	×	×	×	×	×	×	×	×	1 (2007)	×	×	×	×	×	×	×
Latvia	1	×	×	×	×	×	×	×	×	1 (2005)	×	×	×	×	×	×	×
Cyprus	1	×	×	×	×	×	×	×	×	1 (2002)	×	×	×	×	×	×	×
Turks and Caicos Islands	1	×	×	×	×	×	×	×	×	1 (1987)	×	×	×	×	×	×	×
French Polynesia	2	×	×	×	×	×	×	×	×	×	2 (1980, 1981)	×	×	×	×	×	×
Guadeloupe	1	×	×	×	×	×	×	×	×	×	1 (2025)	×	×	×	×	×	×
Malta	1	×	×	×	×	×	×	×	×	×	1 (2025)	×	×	×	×	×	×
Belize	1	×	×	×	×	×	×	×	×	×	1 (1979)	×	×	×	×	×	×
US Virgin Islands	1	×	×	×	×	×	×	×	×	×	1 (1971)	×	×	×	×	×	×
Croatia	5	×	×	×	×	×	×	×	×	×	×	×	1 (2009)	2 (2012, 2017)	1 (2019)	×	1 (2025)
Malaysia	2	×	×	×	×	×	×	×	×	×	×	×	1 (1970)	×	×	×	1 (2024)
Slovenia	1	×	×	×	×	×	×	×	×	×	×	×	1 (2007)	×	×	×	×
Suriname	1	×	×	×	×	×	×	×	×	×	×	×	1 (1958)	×	×	×	×
Alaska	1	×	×	×	×	×	×	×	×	×	×	×	1 (1957)	×	×	×	×
Morocco	1	×	×	×	×	×	×	×	×	×	×	×	1 (1957)	×	×	×	×
Honduras	1	×	×	×	×	×	×	×	×	×	×	×	1 (1955)	×	×	×	×
Laos	1	×	×	×	×	×	×	×	×	×	×	×	×	1 (2022)	×	×	×
Cameroon	1	×	×	×	×	×	×	×	×	×	×	×	×	×	1 (2023)	×	×
Pakistan	1	×	×	×	×	×	×	×	×	×	×	×	×	×	1 (2023)	×	×
Ethiopia	1	×	×	×	×	×	×	×	×	×	×	×	×	×	1 (2006)	×	×
Myanmar	1	×	×	×	×	×	×	×	×	×	×	×	×	×	×	1 (2020)	×
Bangladesh	1	×	×	×	×	×	×	×	×	×	×	×	×	×	×	×	1 (2025)
Latina	1	×	×	×	×	×	×	×	×	×	×	×	×	×	×	×	1 (2025)
Palestine	1	×	×	×	×	×	×	×	×	×	×	×	×	×	×	×	1 (2025)
Rwanda	1	×	×	×	×	×	×	×	×	×	×	×	×	×	×	×	1 (2025)
Cambodia	1	×	×	×	×	×	×	×	×	×	×	×	×	×	×	×	1 (2024)
Egypt	1	×	×	×	×	×	×	×	×	×	×	×	×	×	×	×	1 (2024)
Macau	1	×	×	×	×	×	×	×	×	×	×	×	×	×	×	×	1 (2024)
Serbia	1	×	×	×	×	×	×	×	×	×	×	×	×	×	×	×	1 (2024)

== Total placements ==
This list includes the total placements in Miss Universe by country or territory in ascending order.

Country or territory	Total	Placements
United States	68	1952, 1953, 1954, 1955, 1956, 1958, 1959, 1960, 1961, 1962, 1963, 1964, 1965, 1966, 1967, 1968, 1969, 1970, 1971, 1972, 1973, 1974, 1975, 1977, 1978, 1979, 1980, 1981, 1982, 1983, 1984, 1985, 1986, 1987, 1988, 1989, 1990, 1991, 1992, 1993, 1994, 1995, 1996, 1997, 1998, 2000, 2001, 2003, 2004, 2005, 2006, 2007, 2008, 2009, 2011, 2012, 2013, 2014, 2015, 2016, 2017, 2018, 2019, 2020, 2021, 2022, 2023, 2025
Venezuela	49	1955, 1956, 1964, 1967, 1968, 1970, 1972, 1976, 1977, 1979, 1981, 1983, 1984, 1985, 1986, 1987, 1988, 1989, 1990, 1991, 1992, 1993, 1994, 1995, 1996, 1997, 1998, 1999, 2000, 2001, 2002, 2003, 2005, 2007, 2008, 2009, 2011, 2012, 2013, 2014, 2015, 2017, 2018, 2019, 2021, 2022, 2023, 2024, 2025
Colombia	40	1958, 1959, 1960, 1962, 1963, 1965, 1966, 1969, 1973, 1974, 1975, 1976, 1977, 1978, 1980, 1984, 1986, 1988, 1990, 1992, 1993, 1994, 1995, 1998, 2000, 2004, 2006, 2008, 2010, 2011, 2014, 2015, 2016, 2017, 2019, 2020, 2021, 2022, 2023, 2025
Brazil	40	1954, 1955, 1956, 1957, 1958, 1959, 1960, 1962, 1963, 1964, 1965, 1967, 1968, 1969, 1970, 1971, 1972, 1973, 1975, 1979, 1981, 1982, 1985, 1986, 1993, 1998, 2003, 2006, 2007, 2011, 2012, 2013, 2014, 2015, 2016, 2017, 2018, 2019, 2020, 2025
India	29	1966, 1972, 1973, 1974, 1990, 1992, 1993, 1994, 1995, 1996, 1997, 1998, 1999, 2000, 2001, 2002, 2004, 2006, 2007, 2012, 2013, 2014, 2019, 2020, 2021, 2022, 2023, 2024, 2025
Philippines	29	1954, 1963, 1965, 1966, 1969, 1972, 1973, 1974, 1975, 1980, 1984, 1987, 1994, 1999, 2010, 2011, 2012, 2013, 2014, 2015, 2016, 2017, 2018, 2019, 2020, 2021, 2023, 2024, 2025
Sweden	29	1952, 1954, 1955, 1956, 1957, 1958, 1959, 1961, 1964, 1965, 1966, 1967, 1968, 1969, 1970, 1975, 1978, 1979, 1980, 1981, 1984, 1987, 1989, 1992, 1994, 1996, 1997, 2006, 2009
Puerto Rico	28	1970, 1971, 1974, 1980, 1985, 1986, 1987, 1993, 1995, 1997, 1998, 1999, 2001, 2004, 2005, 2006, 2009, 2010, 2011, 2013, 2018, 2019, 2020, 2021, 2022, 2023, 2024, 2025
South Africa	27	1952, 1953, 1960, 1963, 1965, 1978, 1979, 1982, 1984, 1995, 1998, 1999, 2000, 2002, 2003, 2005, 2008, 2009, 2010, 2012, 2015, 2017, 2018, 2019, 2021, 2022, 2023
France	24	1953, 1954, 1956, 1959, 1961, 1963, 1964, 1968, 1971, 1991, 2000, 2001, 2009, 2010, 2011, 2012, 2014, 2015, 2016, 2019, 2020, 2021, 2024, 2025
Mexico	23	1952, 1953, 1956, 1978, 1988, 1989, 1990, 1991, 1996, 1999, 2004, 2005, 2006, 2007, 2008, 2010, 2012, 2015, 2016, 2019, 2020, 2024, 2025
Peru	23	1953, 1954, 1956, 1957, 1958, 1961, 1965, 1966, 1969, 1972, 1978, 1982, 1987, 1996, 2003, 2005, 2012, 2016, 2019, 2020, 2022, 2023, 2024
Canada	22	1953, 1955, 1957, 1962, 1965, 1968, 1980, 1981, 1982, 1985, 1995, 2000, 2002, 2003, 2005, 2006, 2016, 2017, 2018, 2022, 2024, 2025
Japan	22	1953, 1955, 1957, 1958, 1959, 1960, 1963, 1969, 1970, 1971, 1972, 1973, 1975, 1988, 2003, 2006, 2007, 2008, 2015, 2021, 2024, 2025
Australia	22	1953, 1965, 1969, 1970, 1971, 1972, 1974, 1976, 1992, 1993, 2004, 2008, 2009, 2010, 2011, 2012, 2014, 2015, 2018, 2020, 2022, 2023
Germany	21	1952, 1953, 1954, 1955, 1956, 1957, 1958, 1959, 1960, 1961, 1963, 1966, 1972, 1977, 1979, 1981, 1982, 1983, 1984, 1989, 2002
Spain	20	1960, 1966, 1967, 1971, 1973, 1974, 1977, 1978, 1983, 1985, 1993, 1999, 2000, 2001, 2008, 2013, 2014, 2017, 2022, 2023
Israel	20	1956, 1958, 1959, 1960, 1961, 1962, 1964, 1965, 1966, 1967, 1968, 1969, 1971, 1972, 1973, 1975, 1976, 1978, 2001, 2005
Finland	19	1952, 1962, 1963, 1964, 1965, 1966, 1967, 1968, 1969, 1971, 1974, 1975, 1982, 1983, 1986, 1989, 1993, 1996, 2024
England	19	1955, 1956, 1957, 1959, 1960, 1961, 1962, 1964, 1966, 1967, 1968, 1971, 1972, 1974, 1975, 1976, 1979, 1982, 1983
Greece	18	1952, 1954, 1956, 1957, 1958, 1959, 1960, 1964, 1965, 1967, 1968, 1970, 1973, 1982, 1994, 2001, 2003, 2005
Argentina	17	1954, 1955, 1956, 1957, 1961, 1962, 1963, 1964, 1970, 1973, 1976, 1977, 1979, 2006, 2014, 2020, 2024
Norway	17	1953, 1954, 1955, 1959, 1960, 1964, 1966, 1968, 1969, 1973, 1976, 1981, 1983, 1988, 1990, 2004, 2005
Chile	16	1954, 1958, 1961, 1968, 1969, 1976, 1978, 1985, 1986, 1987, 1989, 1990, 2004, 2023, 2024, 2025
Thailand	16	1965, 1966, 1968, 1984, 1988, 2006, 2007, 2015, 2016, 2017, 2018, 2019, 2020, 2023, 2024, 2025
Italy	16	1953, 1954, 1956, 1957, 1960, 1963, 1964, 1967, 1970, 1982, 1983, 1987, 1994, 1997, 2008, 2014
Netherlands	14	1958, 1965, 1966, 1967, 1977, 1978, 1981, 1984, 1989, 1991, 1992, 2011, 2014, 2025
Dominican Republic	14	1977, 1988, 1995, 2003, 2005, 2008, 2009, 2013, 2015, 2019, 2020, 2022, 2024, 2025
Switzerland	12	1960, 1961, 1969, 1970, 1983, 1986, 1994, 2004, 2005, 2006, 2009, 2013
Belgium	11	1955, 1956, 1959, 1972, 1978, 1981, 1992, 2009, 2010, 2015, 2018
Jamaica	10	1989, 1991, 1999, 2004, 2010, 2014, 2017, 2018, 2020, 2023
Panama	10	1953, 1954, 1974, 1980, 1997, 2002, 2003, 2011, 2016, 2021
Ireland	10	1963, 1967, 1975, 1978, 1983, 1985, 1998, 2010, 2017, 2018
Denmark	9	1953, 1958, 1963, 1965, 1966, 1967, 2006, 2007, 2024
Russia	9	1996, 1998, 2001, 2002, 2006, 2008, 2010, 2012, 2024
Trinidad and Tobago	9	1977, 1995, 1997, 1998, 2003, 2004, 2005, 2006, 2022
Curaçao	8	1968, 1976, 1991, 1997, 2015, 2018, 2020, 2022
Indonesia	8	2005, 2013, 2014, 2015, 2016, 2018, 2019, 2020
South Korea	8	1959, 1960, 1961, 1962, 1963, 1980, 1988, 2007
Costa Rica	7	1954, 2004, 2011, 2013, 2018, 2020, 2025
Nicaragua	7	1977, 2007, 2013, 2020, 2023, 2024, 2025
Austria	7	1953, 1957, 1960, 1962, 1963, 1969, 1977
China	6	2002, 2011, 2013, 2017, 2024, 2025
Paraguay	6	1964, 1991, 2004, 2006, 2021, 2025
Vietnam	6	2008, 2018, 2019, 2020, 2021, 2024
Iceland	6	1959, 1961, 1962, 1980, 2009, 2019
Poland	6	1958, 1959, 1986, 1989, 2012, 2018
Ukraine	6	2006, 2007, 2010, 2011, 2013, 2014
Czech Republic	6	1993, 2003, 2007, 2008, 2009, 2010
Hong Kong	6	1952, 1954, 1967, 1970, 1976, 1988
Uruguay	6	1952, 1953, 1954, 1957, 1982, 1985
Croatia	5	2009, 2012, 2017, 2019, 2025
El Salvador	5	1955, 1975, 1995, 1996, 2023
Great Britain	5	2013, 2017, 2018, 2020, 2021
New Zealand	5	1962, 1980, 1981, 1983, 1992
Scotland	5	1961, 1976, 1977, 1979, 1980
Wales	5	1961, 1967, 1974, 1976, 1979
Cuba	4	1956, 1957, 2024, 2025
Guatemala	4	1955, 1984, 2010, 2025
Aruba	4	1974, 1996, 2021, 2024
Bolivia	4	1964, 1990, 2006, 2024
Ecuador	4	1981, 2004, 2013, 2024
Portugal	4	2011, 2019, 2022, 2023
Haiti	4	1962, 1975, 2016, 2022
Albania	4	2002, 2009, 2010, 2019
Hungary	4	2006, 2008, 2012, 2018
Kosovo	4	2008, 2009, 2011, 2012
Angola	4	2003, 2004, 2007, 2011
Zimbabwe	3	2000, 2024, 2025
Nigeria	3	2001, 2019, 2024
Namibia	3	1992, 2003, 2023
Singapore	3	1983, 1987, 2021
Turkey	3	1953, 1990, 2012
Yugoslavia	3	1968, 1969, 1991
Lebanon	3	1962, 1971, 1973
Taiwan	3	1961, 1962, 1964
Malaysia	2	1970, 2024
Nepal	2	2018, 2023
Ghana	2	1999, 2017
Sri Lanka	2	1955, 2017
Estonia	2	1997, 2000
Czechoslovakia	2	1970, 1990
Democratic Republic of the Congo	2	1985, 1986
Guam	2	1970, 1982
French Polynesia	2	1980, 1981
Hawaii	2	1952, 1958
Bangladesh	1	2025
Côte d'Ivoire	1	2025
Guadeloupe	1	2025
Latina (Note: Non-national delegate competing as the winner of American reality show Miss Universe Latina, el reality.)	1	2025
Malta	1	2025
Palestine	1	2025
Rwanda	1	2025
Cambodia	1	2024
Egypt	1	2024
Macau	1	2024
Serbia	1	2024
Cameroon	1	2023
Pakistan	1	2023
Laos	1	2022
Bahamas	1	2021
Myanmar	1	2020
Kenya	1	2016
Slovenia	1	2007
Tanzania	1	2007
Ethiopia	1	2006
Latvia	1	2005
Serbia and Montenegro	1	2003
Cyprus	1	2002
Botswana	1	1999
Slovakia	1	1994
Soviet Union	1	1991
Turks and Caicos Islands	1	1987
Belize	1	1979
Bermuda	1	1979
US Virgin Islands	1	1971
Suriname	1	1958
Alaska	1	1957
Morocco	1	1957
Honduras	1	1955

Finalists

Country or territory	Total	Titles/Runners-up	Top 5/6
United States	37	31 (1953, 1954, 1956, 1958, 1959, 1960, 1961, 1965, 1967, 1968, 1970, 1973, 1975, 1978, 1980, 1982, 1983, 1986, 1987, 1989, 1990, 1995, 1997, 2001, 2004, 2006, 2007, 2012, 2014, 2015, 2022)	6 (1991, 1993, 1994, 1996, 1998, 2000)
Venezuela	34	29 (1967, 1968, 1972, 1976, 1979, 1981, 1984, 1985, 1986, 1987, 1993, 1994, 1996, 1997, 1998, 2000, 2001, 2002, 2003, 2005, 2007, 2008, 2009, 2012, 2013, 2018, 2022, 2024, 2025)	5 (1991, 1992, 1995, 1999, 2017)
Brazil	16	16 (1954, 1957, 1958, 1959, 1962, 1963, 1968, 1971, 1972, 1979, 1981, 2007, 2011, 2012, 2013, 2020)	×
Colombia	19	15 (1958, 1974, 1977, 1978, 1984, 1986, 1990, 1992, 1993, 1994, 2008, 2014, 2015, 2016, 2017)	4 (1998, 2019, 2021, 2023)
Philippines	17	14 (1963, 1969, 1973, 1975, 1980, 1984, 1999, 2010, 2011, 2012, 2013, 2015, 2018, 2025)	3 (1994, 2016, 2021)
Sweden	13	13 (1954, 1955, 1956, 1964, 1965, 1966, 1975, 1978, 1979, 1980, 1981, 1984, 1989)	×
Puerto Rico	16	12 (1970, 1971, 1985, 1987, 1993, 1998, 2001, 2004, 2005, 2006, 2009, 2019)	4 (1995, 2018, 2022, 2023)
Finland	12	12 (1952, 1962, 1965, 1966, 1967, 1968, 1969, 1971, 1974, 1975, 1986, 1996)	×
Mexico	13	11 (1953, 1988, 1989, 1991, 2005, 2008, 2010, 2019, 2020, 2024, 2025)	2 (1990, 1996)
Australia	13	11 (1953, 1969, 1970, 1971, 1972, 1976, 2004, 2009, 2010, 2012, 2023)	2 (1993, 2015)
South Africa	10	9 (1960, 1978, 1984, 2002, 2003, 2017, 2018, 2019, 2021)	1 (1999)
Japan	9	9 (1953, 1955, 1959, 1969, 1970, 1988, 2003, 2006, 2007)	×
England	9	9 (1956, 1957, 1959, 1961, 1964, 1967, 1972, 1979, 1983)	×
India	9	8 (1966, 1992, 1994, 1995, 2000, 2001, 2020, 2021)	1 (1993)
Spain	8	8 (1960, 1973, 1974, 1978, 1985, 1999, 2000, 2013)	×
Germany	7	7 (1952, 1954, 1955, 1956, 1957, 1961, 1977)	×
Israel	7	7 (1964, 1966, 1967, 1969, 1972, 1973, 1976)	×
Thailand	9	6 (1965, 1966, 1988, 2023, 2024, 2025)	3 (2016, 2017, 2019)
Dominican Republic	6	6 (2003, 2005, 2008, 2009, 2020, 2022)	×
Netherlands	5	4 (1965, 1989, 1991, 2014)	1 (1992)
Canada	5	4 (1981, 1982, 1995, 2005)	1 (2000)
Trinidad and Tobago	5	4 (1977, 1997, 1998, 2004)	1 (1995)
Italy	5	4 (1956, 1960, 1982, 1987)	1 (1997)
Greece	4	4 (1952, 1964, 1982, 2001)	×
Jamaica	4	3 (2010, 2014, 2017)	1 (1991)
Paraguay	3	3 (2004, 2006, 2021)	×
Ukraine	3	3 (2010, 2011, 2014)	×
South Korea	3	3 (1963, 1988, 2007)	×
Norway	3	3 (1959, 1973, 1990)	×
Poland	3	3 (1958, 1986, 1989)	×
Hong Kong	3	3 (1952, 1954, 1988)	×
Scotland	3	3 (1976, 1977, 1980)	×
Wales	3	3 (1961, 1974, 1976)	×
Argentina	3	3 (1961, 1962, 1970)	×
France	3	2 (1953, 2016)	1 (2015)
Russia	3	2 (2002, 2008)	1 (1996)
Denmark	2	2 (1963, 2024)	×
Peru	2	2 (1957, 2020)	×
Haiti	2	2 (1975, 2016)	×
China	2	2 (2002, 2011)	×
Switzerland	2	2 (1983, 2006)	×
Aruba	2	2 (1974, 1996)	×
Ireland	2	2 (1963, 1983)	×
New Zealand	2	2 (1980, 1983)	×
Austria	2	2 (1960, 1977)	×
Taiwan	2	2 (1962, 1964)	×
Hawaii	2	2 (1952, 1958)	×
Curaçao	3	1 (1968)	2 (1997, 2022)
Panama	2	1 (2002)	1 (1997)
Belgium	2	1 (1981)	1 (1992)
Chile	2	1 (1987)	1 (1990)
Ivory Coast	1	1 (2025)	×
Nigeria	1	1 (2024)	×
Nicaragua	1	1 (2023)	×
Ecuador	1	1 (2013)	×
Angola	1	1 (2011)	×
Kosovo	1	1 (2009)	×
Serbia and Montenegro	1	1 (2003)	×
Botswana	1	1 (1999)	×
Namibia	1	1 (1992)	×
Soviet Union	1	1 (1991)	×
Democratic Republic of the Congo	1	1 (1985)	×
Uruguay	1	1 (1985)	×
Guam	1	1 (1982)	×
Bermuda	1	1 (1979)	×
Lebanon	1	1 (1971)	×
Iceland	1	1 (1962)	×
Cuba	1	1 (1957)	×
El Salvador	1	1 (1955)	×
Sri Lanka	1	1 (1955)	×
Vietnam	1	×	1 (2018)
Kenya	1	×	1 (2016)
Slovakia	1	×	1 (1994)
Bolivia	1	×	1 (1990)

== Longest placement streaks ==
This list includes placement streaks, or continuous placements lasting at least five years, in Miss Universe by country or territory in ascending order.

Country or territory	Total	Duration	Placements
United States	22	1977–1998	1977, 1978, 1979, 1980, 1981, 1982, 1983, 1984, 1985, 1986, 1987, 1988, 1989, 1990, 1991, 1992, 1993, 1994, 1995, 1996, 1997, 1998
Venezuela	21	1983–2003	1983, 1984, 1985, 1986, 1987, 1988, 1989, 1990, 1991, 1992, 1993, 1994, 1995, 1996, 1997, 1998, 1999, 2000, 2001, 2002, 2003
United States	18	1958–1975	1958, 1959, 1960, 1961, 1962, 1963, 1964, 1965, 1966, 1967, 1968, 1969, 1970, 1971, 1972, 1973, 1974, 1975
United States	13	2011–2023	2011, 2012, 2013, 2014, 2015, 2016, 2017, 2018, 2019, 2020, 2021, 2022, 2023
Philippines	12	2010–2021	2010, 2011, 2012, 2013, 2014, 2015, 2016, 2017, 2018, 2019, 2020, 2021
India	11	1992–2002	1992, 1993, 1994, 1995, 1996, 1997, 1998, 1999, 2000, 2001, 2002
Brazil	10	2011–2020	2011, 2012, 2013, 2014, 2015, 2016, 2017, 2018, 2019, 2020
Germany	10	1952–1961	1952, 1953, 1954, 1955, 1956, 1957, 1958, 1959, 1960, 1961
Puerto Rico	8	2018–ongoing	2018, 2019, 2020, 2021, 2022, 2023, 2024, 2025
Finland	8	1962–1969	1962, 1963, 1964, 1965, 1966, 1967, 1968, 1969
India	7	2019–ongoing	2019, 2020, 2021, 2022, 2023, 2024, 2025
United States	7	2003–2009	2003, 2004, 2005, 2006, 2007, 2008, 2009
Brazil	7	1967–1973	1967, 1968, 1969, 1970, 1971, 1972, 1973
Sweden	7	1964–1970	1964, 1965, 1966, 1967, 1968, 1969, 1970
Brazil	7	1954–1960	1954, 1955, 1956, 1957, 1958, 1959, 1960
Thailand	6	2015–2020	2015, 2016, 2017, 2018, 2019, 2020
Colombia	6	1973–1978	1973, 1974, 1975, 1976, 1977, 1978
Israel	6	1964–1969	1964, 1965, 1966, 1967, 1968, 1969
Sweden	6	1954–1959	1954, 1955, 1956, 1957, 1958, 1959
Venezuela	5	2021–ongoing	2021, 2022, 2023, 2024, 2025
Colombia	5	2019–2023	2019, 2020, 2021, 2022, 2023
Venezuela	5	2011–2015	2011, 2012, 2013, 2014, 2015
Australia	5	2008–2012	2008, 2009, 2010, 2011, 2012
Mexico	5	2004–2008	2004, 2005, 2006, 2007, 2008
Japan	5	1969–1973	1969, 1970, 1971, 1972, 1973
South Korea	5	1959–1963	1959, 1960, 1961, 1962, 1963
Israel	5	1958–1962	1958, 1959, 1960, 1961, 1962
Greece	5	1956–1960	1956, 1957, 1958, 1959, 1960
United States	5	1952–1956	1952, 1953, 1954, 1955, 1956

== Placement system by edition ==
This list includes the placement system in Miss Universe by edition.

Edition	First round	Second round	Third round	Fourth round
1952	10	5	N/A	N/A
1953	16	5	N/A	N/A
1954	16	5	N/A	N/A
1955	15	5	N/A	N/A
1956	15	5	N/A	N/A
1957	15	5	N/A	N/A
1958	15	5	N/A	N/A
1959	15	5	N/A	N/A
1960	15	5	N/A	N/A
1961	15	5	N/A	N/A
1962	15	5	N/A	N/A
1963	15	5	N/A	N/A
1964	15	10	5	N/A
1965	15	5	N/A	N/A
1966	15	5	N/A	N/A
1967	15	5	N/A	N/A
1968	15	5	N/A	N/A
1969	15	5	N/A	N/A
1970	15	5	N/A	N/A
1971	12	5	N/A	N/A
1972	12	5	N/A	N/A
1973	12	5	N/A	N/A
1974	12	5	N/A	N/A
1975	12	5	N/A	N/A
1976	12	5	N/A	N/A
1977	12	5	N/A	N/A
1978	12	5	N/A	N/A
1979	12	5	N/A	N/A
1980	12	5	N/A	N/A
1981	12	5	N/A	N/A
1982	12	5	N/A	N/A
1983	12	5	N/A	N/A
1984	10	5	N/A	N/A
1985	10	5	N/A	N/A
1986	10	5	N/A	N/A
1987	10	5	N/A	N/A
1988	10	5	N/A	N/A
1989	10	5	N/A	N/A
1990	10	6	3	N/A
1991	10	6	3	N/A
1992	10	6	3	N/A
1993	10	6	3	N/A
1994	10	6	3	N/A
1995	10	6	3	N/A
1996	10	6	3	N/A
1997	10	6	3	N/A
1998	10	5	3	N/A
1999	10	5	3	N/A
2000	10	5	3	N/A
2001	10	5	N/A	N/A
2002	10	5	N/A	N/A
2003	15	10	5	N/A
2004	15	10	5	N/A
2005	15	10	5	N/A
2006	20	10	5	N/A
2007	15	10	5	N/A
2008	15	10	5	N/A
2009	15	10	5	N/A
2010	15	10	5	N/A
2011	16	10	5	N/A
2012	16	10	5	N/A
2013	16	10	5	N/A
2014	15	10	5	N/A
2015	15	10	5	3
2016	13	9	6	3
2017	16	10	5	3
2018	20	10	5	3
2019	20	10	5	3
2020	21	10	5	N/A
2021	16	10	5	3
2022	16	5	3	N/A
2023	20	10	5	3
2024	30	12	5	N/A
2025	30	12	5	N/A

Placement history

Feature	List
By placement round	First round (74 editions) [1952–2025]: Top 10: 20 editions (1952; 1984–2002); Top 12: 13 editions (1971–1983); Top 13: 1 edition (2016); Top 15: 25 editions (1955–1970; 2003–2005; 2007–2010; 2014–2015); Top 16: 8 editions (1953–1954; 2011–2013; 2017; 2021–2022); Top 20: 4 editions (2006; 2018–2019, 2023); Top 21: 1 edition (2020); Top 30: 2 editions (2024–2025)
By placement round	Second round (74 editions) [1952–2025]: Top 5: 43 editions (1952–1963; 1965–1989; 1998–2002; 2022); Top 6: 8 editions (1990–1997); Top 9: 1 edition (2016); Top 10: 20 editions (1964; 2003–2015; 2017–2021; 2023); Top 12: 2 editions (2024–2025)
By placement round	Third round (35 editions) [1964; 1990–2000; 2003–2025]: Top 3: 12 editions (1990–2000; 2022); Top 5: 22 editions (1964; 2003–2015; 2017–2021; 2023–2025); Top 6: 1 edition (2016)
By placement round	Fourth round (7 editions) [2015–2019; 2021; 2023]: Top 3: 7 editions (2015–2019; 2021; 2023)
By competition system	16 types (74 editions) [1952–2025]: 3 editions: Top 10 > Top 5 > Top 3 (1998–2000); 9 editions: Top 10 > Top 5 (1952; 1984–1989; 2001–2002); 8 editions: Top 10 > Top 6 > Top 3 (1990–1997); 13 editions: Top 12 > Top 5 (1971–1983); 1 edition: Top 13 > Top 9 > Top 6 > Top 3 (2016); 15 editions: Top 15 > Top 5 (1955–1963; 1965–1970); 1 edition: Top 15 > Top 10 > Top 5 > Top 3 (2015); 9 editions: Top 15 > Top 10 > Top 5 (1964; 2003–2005; 2007–2010; 2014); 1 edition: Top 16 > Top 5 > Top 3 (2022); 2 editions: Top 16 > Top 5 (1953–1954); 2 editions: Top 16 > Top 10 > Top 5 > Top 3 (2017; 2021); 3 editions: Top 16 > Top 10 > Top 5 (2011–2013); 3 editions: Top 20 > Top 10 > Top 5 > Top 3 (2018–2019; 2023); 1 edition: Top 20 > Top 10 > Top 5 (2006); 1 edition: Top 21 > Top 10 > Top 5 (2020); 2 editions: Top 30 > Top 12 > Top 5 (2024–2025)
By number of rounds	2 rounds (39 editions) [1952–1963; 1965–1989; 2001–2002]: 9 editions: Top 10 > Top 5 (1952; 1984–1989; 2001–2002); 13 editions: Top 12 > Top 5 (1971–1983); 15 editions: Top 15 > Top 5 (1955–1963; 1965–1970); 2 editions: Top 16 > Top 5 (1953–1954)
By number of rounds	3 rounds (28 editions) [1964; 1990–2000; 2003–2014; 2020; 2022; 2024–2025]: 3 editions: Top 10 > Top 5 > Top 3 (1998–2000); 8 editions: Top 10 > Top 6 > Top 3 (1990–1997); 9 editions: Top 15 > Top 10 > Top 5 (1964; 2003–2005; 2007–2010; 2014); 1 edition: Top 16> Top 5 > Top 3 (2022); 3 editions: Top 16 > Top 10 > 5 (2011–2013); 1 edition: Top 20 > Top 10 > Top 5 (2006); 1 edition: Top 21 > Top 10 > Top 5 (2020); 2 editions: Top 30 > Top 12 > Top 5 (2024–2025)
By number of rounds	4 rounds (7 editions) [2015–2019; 2021; 2023]: 1 edition: Top 13 > Top 9 > Top 6 > Top 3 (2016); 1 edition: Top 15 > Top 10 > Top 5 > Top 3 (2015); 2 editions: Top 16 > Top 10 > Top 5 > Top 3 (2017; 2021); 3 editions: Top 20> Top 10 > Top 5 > Top 3 (2018–2019; 2023)
By type of placement	12 types: Top 3 [19 editions]: third round (1990–2000; 2022) [12 editions]; fourth round (2015–2019; 2021; 2023) [7 editions]; Top 5 [65 editions]: second round (1952–1963; 1965–1989; 1998–2002; 2022) [43 editions]; third round (1964; 2003–2015; 2017–2021; 2023–2025) [22 editions]; Top 6 [9 editions]: second round (1990–1997) [8 editions]; third round (2016) [1 edition]; Top 9 [1 edition]: second round (2016) [1 edition]; Top 10 [40 editions]: first round (1952; 1984–2002) [20 editions]; second round (1964; 2003–2015; 2017–2021; 2023) [20 editions]; Top 12 [15 editions]: first round (1971–1983) [13 editions]; second round (2024–2025) [2 editions]; Top 13 [1 edition]: first round (2016) [1 edition]; Top 15 [25 editions]: first round (1955–1970; 2003–2005; 2007–2010; 2014–2015) [25 editions]; Top 16 [8 editions]: first round (1953–1954; 2011–2013; 2017; 2021–2022) [8 editions]; Top 20 [4 editions]: first round (2006; 2018–2019; 2023) [4 editions]; Top 21 [1 edition]: first round (2020) [1 edition]; Top 30 [2 editions]: first round (2024–2025) [2 editions]

== Continental titleholders ==
This list includes the name and country or territory of the continental titleholders in Miss Universe.

Since 2024, Miss Universe has awarded continental titles. The continental titleholders are selected by the most number of social media engagements during the competition, regardless of their placements in the competition. Venezuela, Thailand, and Mexico were exempted due to the conflict of interest as the Miss Universe is currently jointly owned by the three countries.

Year	Miss Universe Africa & Oceania	Miss Universe Americas	Miss Universe Asia	Miss Universe Europe & Middle East
2024	Chidimma Adetshina; Nigeria	Tatiana Calmell; Peru	Chelsea Manalo; Philippines	Matilda Wirtavuori; Finland
2025	Olivia Yacé (Note: Three days after receiving the title of Miss Universe Africa and Oceania, the Miss Côte d'Ivoire organization posted on their social media account the resignation of Miss Côte d'Ivoire Olivia Yacé for personal reasons.) (Resigned); Côte d'Ivoire	Stephany Abasali; Venezuela	Zhao Na; China	Julia Cluett; Malta

== See also ==
- List of Miss Universe titleholders
- List of Miss Earth elemental queens
- List of Miss International runners-up and finalists
- List of Miss World runners-up and finalists
- Big Four international beauty pageants
