= Karen Elizabeth Tilley =

Canadian dancer (born 1964)

Karen Tilley
- Born: Karen Elizabeth Tilley; 1964 (age 61–62); Quebec City, Quebec, Canada
- Height: 5'10
- Beauty pageant titleholder
- Title: Miss Canada 1985
- Hair colour: Blonde
- Eye colour: Blue
- Major competitions: Miss Canada 1985 (Winner); Miss Universe 1985 ׁ(Top 10)

Karen Elizabeth Tilley is a Canadian dancer, model and beauty pageant titleholder who was crowned Miss Canada 1985. She also placed in the top 10 at the 1985 Miss Universe pageant.

== Life ==
Tilley was born in Quebec City, Quebec, and later moved to Calgary, Alberta and represented this province in the Miss Canada competition. Tilley's hobbies include cooking, travelling, dancing and hiking. When she won the national competition, she earned $76,937.80 (Canadian Dollars) in cash and prizes, including a $12,000 Pontiac Fiero, a $6,000 fur coat and a $1,500 scholarship.

In the following year, after her win as Miss Canada, Tilley was based in Toronto where she participated in promotional events for sponsors, whose presence was paid for by companies on a 'per-appearance basis', and traveled to different places in Canada. She described her appearances as public relations, a career she intended to follow after her year as Miss Canada.

Tilley represented Canada in the 1985 Miss Universe competition and was one of ten semifinalists when Deborah Carthy-Deu of Puerto Rico was crowned as Miss Universe.

Honorary titles
Preceded by Cynthia Michele Kereluk	Miss Canada; 1985	Succeeded by Rene Newhouse
