= Corsari =

Corsari is a surname. Notable people with the surname include:

- Tony Corsari (1926 – 2011), a Belgian TV show host and singer
- Willy Corsari (1897 – 1998), a Dutch actor and novelist
