= Geri Hoo =

American beauty queen and actress from California

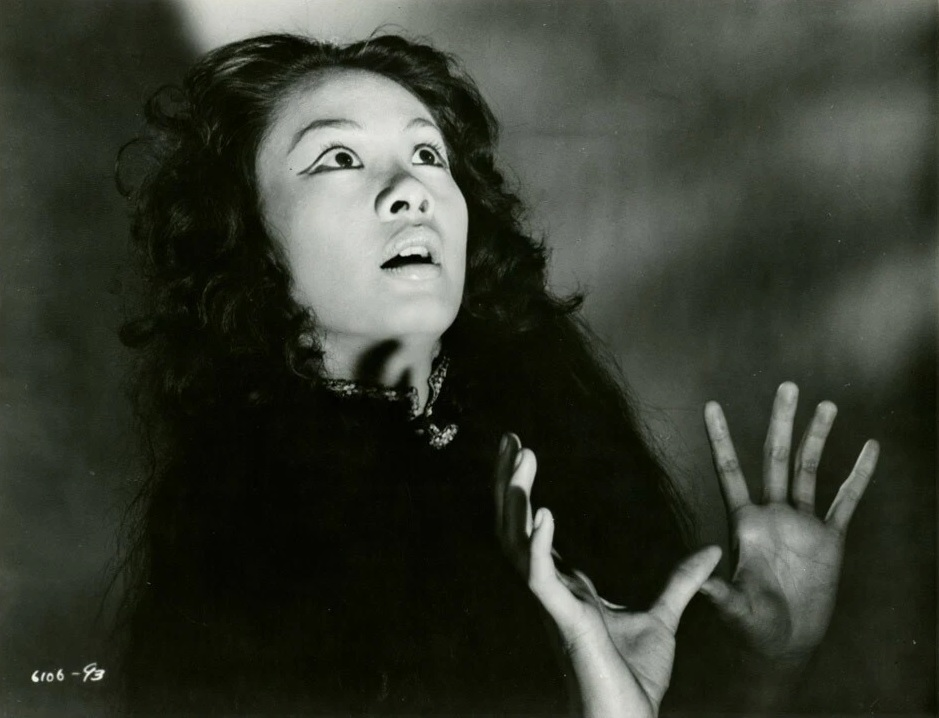
- Hoo in a publicity photo from Confessions of an Opium Eater (1962)
- Born: Geraldine Hoo; 1939
- Died: December 29, 2007
- Spouse: Austin F. Phillips
- Children: 4
- Beauty pageant titleholder
- Title: Miss Hawaii Universe 1958
- Major competitions: Miss Hawaii Universe 1958; (Winner); Miss Universe 1958; (2nd Runner-Up)
- Other names: Geri Hoo Phillips, Geri DeWelles
- Occupations: Actress, Beauty queen

Geraldine "Geri" Hoo Dewelles (1939 - Dec. 29, 2007) was an American actress and beauty pageant titleholder. Hoo was Miss Hawaii Universe 1958.

== Early life ==
In 1939, Hoo was born. Hoo's father was Herbert N. Hoo. Hoo's mother was Amy Kui Kiao Hoo (1920-2000), a realtor in Hawaii. Hoo's sibling are Sidney Hung, Vernon, Rick, Randy, and Sharon.

== Career ==
In 1958, Hoo represented Hawaii and ended up as the second runner up at the 7th Miss Universe contest.

Hoo had a minor part in the 1962 film Confessions of an Opium Eater.

== Filmography ==
=== Television series ===
- 1959 The Millionaire - Miss Hawaii.

=== Films ===
- 1962 Confessions of an Opium Eater - 2nd Dancing girl.

== Personal life ==
In 1958, Hoo married Austin F. Phillips. They have four children. Hoo and her family lived in Los Angeles, California.

Hoo was also known as Geri DeWelles. Hoo was a resident of Costa Mesa, California. On December 29, 2007, Hoo died. Hoo was 68.

== See also ==
- List of Miss Universe runners-up and finalists
