= Tony Corsari =

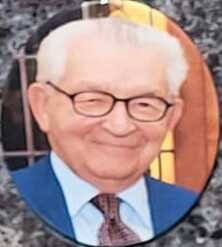
- Image of Corsari at his grave site in Nevele, East Flanders
- Born: André Mathilde Édouard Parengh; 12 November 1926; Tienen, Belgium
- Died: 2 September 2011 (aged 84); Ghent, Belgium
- Occupations: television presenter, musician

André Mathilde Édouard Parengh (12 November 1926 – 2 September 2011), better known under the pseudonym Tony Corsari, was a Belgian TV show host and presenter. He also scored a few minor hits as a singer. He was the host of the popular Flemish TV quiz show 100.000 of niets from 1956 until 1959.

He was born in Tienen and died of cancer in Ghent.
