= Liliane Taelemans =

- Born: 1938
- Died: 2018 (aged 79–80)
- Beauty pageant titleholder
- Title: Miss Belgium 1958
- Major competitions: Miss Belgium 1958 (Winner); Miss Universe 1958 (Unplaced)

Liliane Taelemans (1938-2018) was a Belgian TV host, model and beauty pageant titleholder who was crowned Miss Belgium 1958 and represented Belgium at Miss Universe 1958. She was also a presenter in the Flemish show - 100.000 of niets.
