= Priscila Machado =

Brazilian model, Miss Brasil 2011 (born 1986)

- Born: 4 January 1986 (age 40); Canoas, Rio Grande do Sul, Brazil
- Beauty pageant titleholder
- Title: Miss Rio Grande do Sul; Miss Brazil 2011
- Hair color: Brown
- Eye color: Brown
- Major competitions: Miss Brazil 2011 (Winner); Miss Universe 2011 (2nd Runner-Up)

Priscila Machado (born 4 January 1986) is a Brazilian TV host, model and beauty pageant titleholder who was crowned Miss Brazil 2011. She represented Brazil in Miss Universe 2011 where she placed 2nd Runner-Up.

== Personal life ==
Machado was born in Canoas, Rio Grande do Sul in 1986. She has dated with the Brazilian swimmer and gold medalist in the 2008 Summer Olympic Games, César Cielo.

Priscila Machado became host of the Bola Divida station's RedeTV.

== Pageantry ==
=== Miss Brasil 2011 ===
Machado was not a favorite for the Miss Brasil 2011 title; however, she advanced to the final stage on 23 July and was crowned as the most beautiful woman in the country, winning the eleventh title for Rio Grande do Sul and expanding the advantage of the state as the biggest winner in the history of the pageant.

=== Miss Universe 2011 ===
Priscila Machado was the second runner-up at the Miss Universe 2011 pageant.

== Controversy ==
After she was crowned Miss Brasil 2011, Machado was booed by the audience at HSBC Brasil. Supporters of other candidates, outraged by the victory of Miss Rio Grande do Sul, shouted insults against the winner, such as "peladona" (naked) and "marmelada" (a term used in Brazilian Portuguese to refer to a situation where someone cheats in a game or vote). One of the reasons for the audience reaction was a photo released a few days before the pageant in which Machado appears topless, something forbidden by the rules of the contest. However, days after being crowned Miss Brasil 2011, the organization of the contest defended Machado's title, claiming that the photo should not be considered, since it had not received authorization to be disclosed.

In addition to that, Machado also sparked further controversy after she revealed that she had done three plastic surgeries: breast augmentation, liposuction and rhinoplasty.

Awards and achievements
Preceded by (Australia) Jesinta Campbell	Miss Universe 2nd Runner-Up; 2011	Succeeded by (Venezuela) Irene Esser
Preceded by (Minas Gerais) Débora Lyra	Miss Universo Brasil; 2011	Succeeded by (Rio Grande do Sul) Gabriela Markus
Preceded by Bruna Jaroceski	Miss Rio Grande do Sul; 2011	Succeeded by Gabriela Markus
