= Teresa Sánchez López =

Spanish model (born 1964)

- Born: Maria Teresa Sánchez López; July 1, 1964 (age 62); Seville, Spain
- Height: 1.75 m (5 ft 9 in)
- Beauty pageant titleholder
- Title: Miss Seville; Miss Western Andalusia; Miss National (Spain) 1984
- Eye color: brown
- Major competitions: Miss Spain 1984 (1st Runner-Up/Miss National); Miss Universe 1985 (1st Runner-Up)

Teresa Sánchez López (born July 1, 1964 in Seville) is a Spanish model and beauty pageant titleholder who won the title of Miss National in the Miss Spain contest at 1984 and represented Spain at Miss Universe 1985 where she finished as first runner-up.

== Biography ==
Sánchez López prepared for a career in modeling at Escuela de Modelos y Promoción de la Moda, located in Seville.

In 1984, she was elected Miss Seville and Miss Western Andalucia. That same year she participated in the Miss Spain contest, winning the title of Miss National, gaining the right to compete at Miss Universe the following year.

In 1985, Teresa competed in Miss Universe 1985 representing Spain where she finished as first runner-up. This was the highest placement for Spain since 1974 when Amparo Muñoz won the title and remained the highest non-winning placement for the country until 2013 when Patricia Yurena Rodríguez also finished as first runner-up (coincidentally both Sánchez López and Rodríguez lost to contestants from Latin American countries). During the pageant Sánchez López was a favorite among media and pageant experts to win the crown.

Awards and achievements
Preceded by (South Africa) Letitia Snyman	Miss Universe 1st Runner Up; 1985	Succeeded by (United States) Christy Fichtner
Preceded by (Biscay) Garbiñe Abasolo	Miss Spain (Miss Nacional); 1984	Succeeded by (Province of Málaga) Isabel Tur Espinosa
