= Miss Universe 1958 =

7th Miss Universe pageant

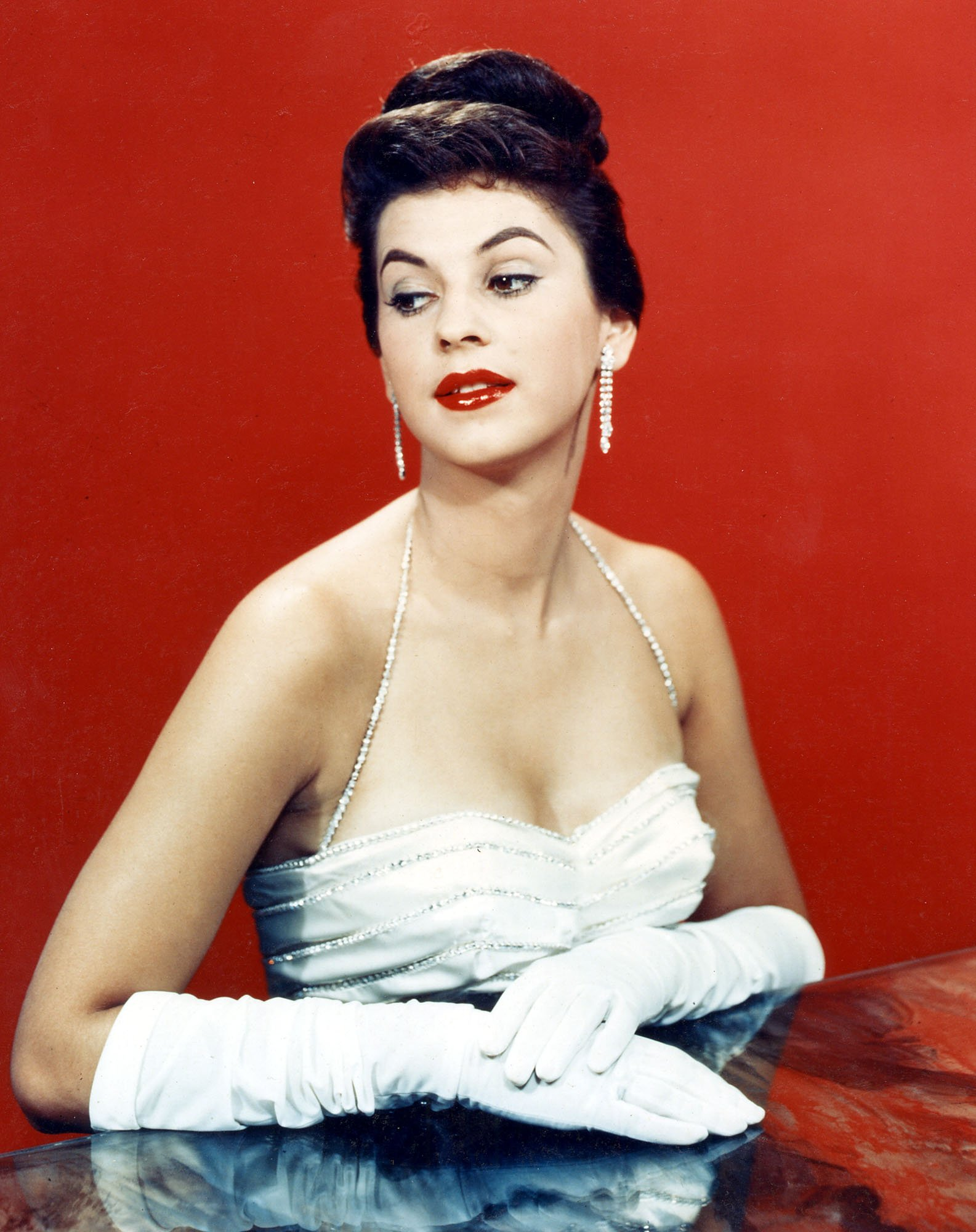
- Luz Marina Zuluaga
- Date: 25 July 1958
- Presenters: Byron Palmer
- Venue: Long Beach Municipal Auditorium, Long Beach, California, United States
- Broadcaster: CBS
- Entrants: 35
- Placements: 15
- Debuts: Colombia; Poland; Suriname
- Withdrawals: Austria; Ceylon; Costa Rica; Iceland; Martinique; Morocco; Philippines; Puerto Rico; Turkey
- Returns: Australia; British Guiana; Chile; Denmark; Holland; Norway; Singapore; United States; West Indies
- Winner: Luz Marina Zuluaga; Colombia
- Congeniality: Tomoko Moritake (Japan)
- Photogenic: Corine Rottschäfer (Holland)

Miss Universe 1958 was the seventh Miss Universe pageant, held at the Long Beach Municipal Auditorium in Long Beach, California, on 25 July 1958.

At the conclusion of the event, Gladys Zender of Peru crowned Luz Marina Zuluaga of Colombia as Miss Universe 1958. Zuluaga was the first representative of Colombia to win the contest.

Contestants from thirty-six countries and territories competed in this year's pageant. The pageant was hosted by Byron Palmer.

== Background ==
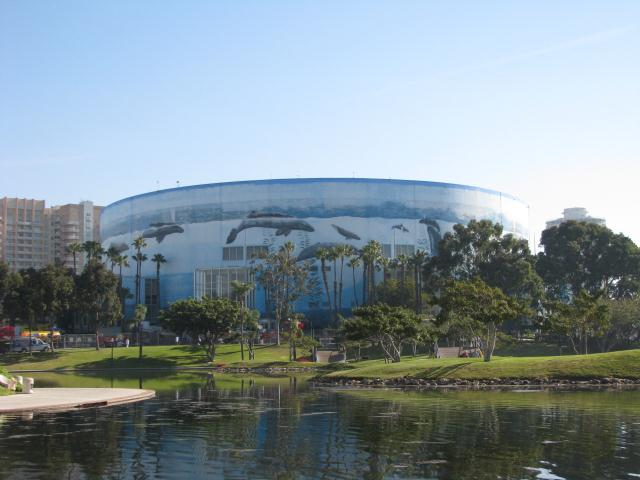
Long Beach Municipal Auditorium, the venue of Miss Universe 1958

=== Selection of participants ===
Contestants from thirty-five countries and territories were selected to compete in the pageant. Two contestants were selected to replace the original dethroned winner.

==== Replacements ====
Luz Marina Zuluaga, the first runner-up of Señorita Colombia 1957, was appointed to replace Señorita Colombia 1957 Doris Inés Gil as she decided to get married instead of competing at the pageant. June Cooper was supposed to represent England in this edition, but was dethroned after it was discovered that she did not meet the minimum age requirement. Due to the dethronement of Cooper, a separate contest was held to pick a new representative of England to the contest. Wendy Peters won this contest, but was also dethroned after it was discovered that she was previously married. Due to this, the pageant organizers decided to appoint Dorothy Hazeldine as the representative of England in this edition.

==== Debuts, returns, and withdrawals ====
This edition saw the debuts of Colombia, Poland, and Surinam, and the returns of Australia, the British Guiana, Chile, Denmark, Holland, Norway, Singapore, the United States, and the West Indies. Denmark, which last competed in 1953, Australia and Singapore in 1954, Norway and the West Indies in 1955, while the others last competed in 1956.

Austria, Ceylon, Costa Rica, Iceland, Martinique, Morocco, the Philippines, Puerto Rico, and Turkey withdrew. Hanni Ehrenstrasser of Austria withdrew after winning another international beauty contest. Eugenia Valverde of Costa Rica withdrew after not meeting the minimum age requirement. Despite being barred from the competition, Valverde was allowed to join the preliminary competition without being scored. Carmen Remedios Tuason of the Philippines withdrew due to her family not allowing her to join the competition. Miss Turkey 1958, Ezel Olcay withdrew from competition for unknown reasons but competed in the Miss Universe 1959 instead.

== Results ==
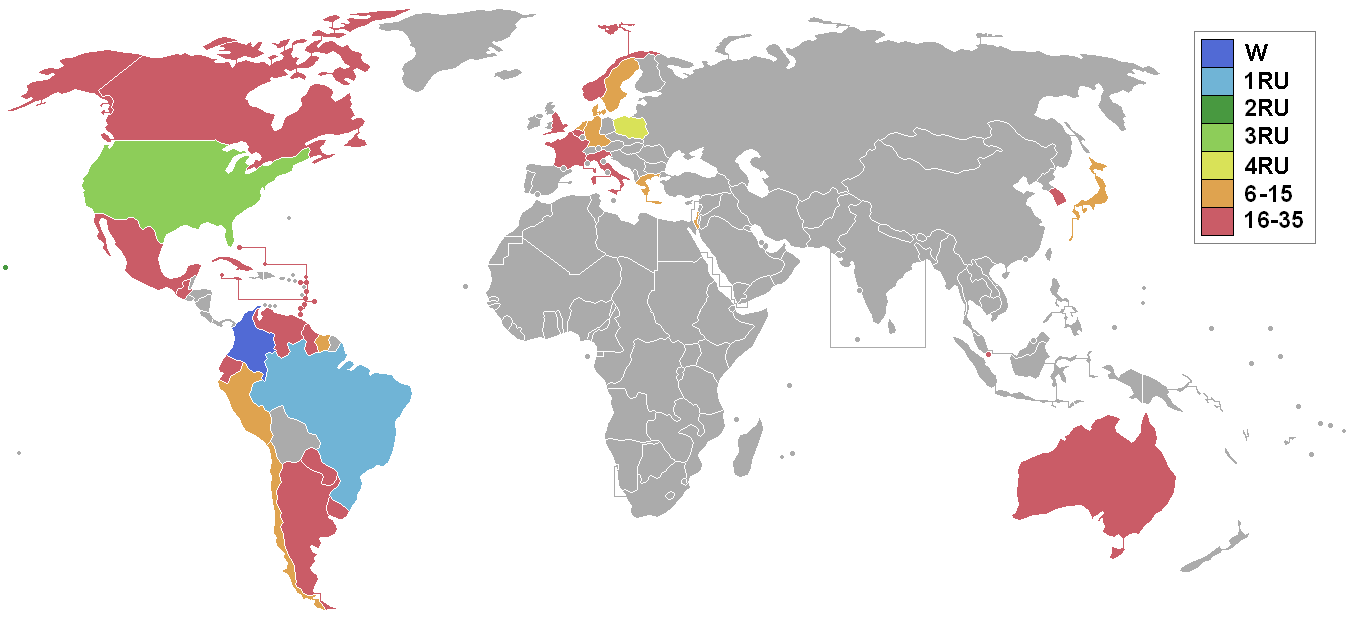
Miss Universe 1958 participating countries and territories

=== Placements ===
Placement	Contestant
Miss Universe 1958	Colombia – Luz Marina Zuluaga
1st Runner-Up	Brazil – Adalgisa Colombo
2nd Runner-Up	Hawaii – Geri Hoo
3rd Runner-Up	United States – Eurlyne Howell
4th Runner-Up	Poland – Alicja Bobrowska
Top 15	Chile – Raquel Molina; Denmark – Evy Norlund; Greece – Marily Kalimopoulou; Holland – Corine Rottschäfer; Israel – Miriam Hadar; Japan – Tomoko Moritake; Peru – Beatriz Boluarte; Suriname – Gertrud Gummels; Sweden – Birgitta Gårdman; West Germany – Marlies Behrens

=== Special awards ===
Award	Contestant
Miss Friendship	Japan – Tomoko Moritake
Miss Photogenic	Holland – Corine Rottschäfer
Miss Popular Girl	Australia – Astrid Lindholm

== Pageant ==
=== Format ===
Same with 1955, fifteen semi-finalists were chosen at the preliminary competition that consists of the swimsuit and evening gown competition. Each of the fifteen semi-finalists gave a short speech during the final telecast using their native languages. Afterwards, the fifteen semi-finalists paraded again in their swimsuits and evening gowns, and the five finalists were eventually chosen.

=== Selection committee ===
- David Arasik – Israeli editor of Cinema magazine
- Raul Ferrada – Chilean newspaper editor
- Jacob Gaudaur – Canadian oarsman
- Ma Ma Loa – Famous Hawaiian singer
- Miyoko Nayagita – Member of the Woman Artists Association
- Vincent Trotta – American artist
- Alberto Vargas – Peruvian-American painter known for his "Vargas Girls"
- Earl Wilson – American journalist and columnist
- Roger Zeiler – French official from the Miss Europe Committee

== Contestants ==
Thirty-five contestants competed for the title.

Country/Territory	Contestant	Age (Note: Ages at the time of the pageant)	Hometown
Alaska	Eleanor Moses	20	Fairbanks
Argentina	Celina Ayala	19	Misiones
Australia	Astrid Lindholm	20	Adelaide
Belgium	Liliane Taelemans	20	Brussels
Brazil	Adalgisa Colombo	18	Rio de Janeiro
British Guiana	Clyo Fernandes	18	Georgetown
Canada	Eileen Conroy	21	Toronto
Chile	Raquel Molina	23	Quilpué
Colombia	Luz Marina Zuluaga	19	Manizales
Cuba	Arminia Pérez	21	Havana
Denmark	Evy Norlund	20	Copenhagen
Ecuador	Alicia Vallejo	22	Riobamba
England	Dorothy Hazeldine	19	Rochdale
France	Monique Boulinguez	21	Paris
Greece	Marily Kalimopoulou	18	Athens
Guatemala	Maya Glinz	19	Guatemala City
Hawaii	Geri Hoo	18	Honolulu
Holland	Corine Rottschäfer	20	Amsterdam
Israel	Miriam Hadar	21	Jerusalem
Italy	Clara Coppola	20	Lazio
Japan	Tomoko Moritake	20	Nagasaki
Mexico	Elvira Leticia Risser	19	Mexico City
Norway	Greta Andersen	20	Stavanger
Paraguay	Graciela Scorza	18	Asunción
Peru	Beatriz Boluarte	19	Lima
Poland	Alicja Bobrowska	22	Kraków
Singapore	Marion Willis	19	Singapore
South Korea	Geum-soon Oh	19	Seoul
(Suriname (Kingdom of the Netherlands)) Suriname	Gertrud Gummels	20	Paramaribo
Sweden	Birgitta Gårdman	19	Stockholm
United States	Eurlyne Howell	18	Bossier City
Uruguay	Irene Augustyniak	20	Montevideo
Venezuela	Ida Margarita Pieri	18	Carúpano
West Germany	Marlies Behrens	19	Munich
West Indies	Angela Tong	–	Port of Spain
