= 100.000 of niets =

- TV screenshot of the quiz
- Genre: Quiz show
- Country of origin: Belgium
- Original language: Dutch

Original release
- Network: N.I.R. (nowadays the VRT)
- Release: December 11, 1956 – 1959

100.000 of niets (100,000 or nothing) was a Flemish television quiz show on the Flemish public broadcaster N.I.R. (nowadays the VRT), between 1956 and 1959. It was one of the most popular television shows from the Flemish pioneer years.

== Concept ==
100.000 of niets was originally part of another quiz show, Knal, wie vangt de bal? (Bang, who catches the ball?). It aired on December 11, 1956, and by January 12, 1958, it became an independent weekly show. The programme was hosted by Tony Corsari, Bob Van Bael and Pros Verbruggen and the jury was hosted by Mr. Van Hove, Professor Lucien De Smet and Dr. A.J. Aernouts. In 1959 the show was cancelled. In 1968 it returned to the screen, presented by Pros Verbruggen, Jan Theys and Rudy Samson. Regine Clauwaert was the female guest host.

Each show had three candidates and four thematical rounds. One candidate remained in the finale and had to answer one very detailed question correctly. The prize was 100.000 Belgian francs, though most of the time the winner just received a kitchen appliance.

== Controversy ==
While the show was popular quite some candidates criticized the correct answers needed. On March 9, 1958, one candidate named Van Cuyck lost after giving only one wrong answer in a series of seven correct ones. In comparison to present-day norms, many questions were phrased in an ambiguous manner and since every round the acceptance of dubious answers tended to differ at times. One time a candidate complained that his answer was indeed correct, despite being told it wasn't. Corsari personally made sure that the man received his award after all.

Female host Liliane Taelemans received a lot of criticism because her clothes were considered to be "too revealing". She was eventually fired and in 1958 she went on to become the Belgian candidate for the Miss Universe election.

== In popular culture ==
- In The Adventures of Nero album "De Witte Parel" ("The White Pearl") (1962) Nero is a contestant on "100.000 of Niets". The host is a caricature of Tony Corsari.
