= Luz Marina Zuluaga =

Colombian beauty pageant titleholder (1938–2015)

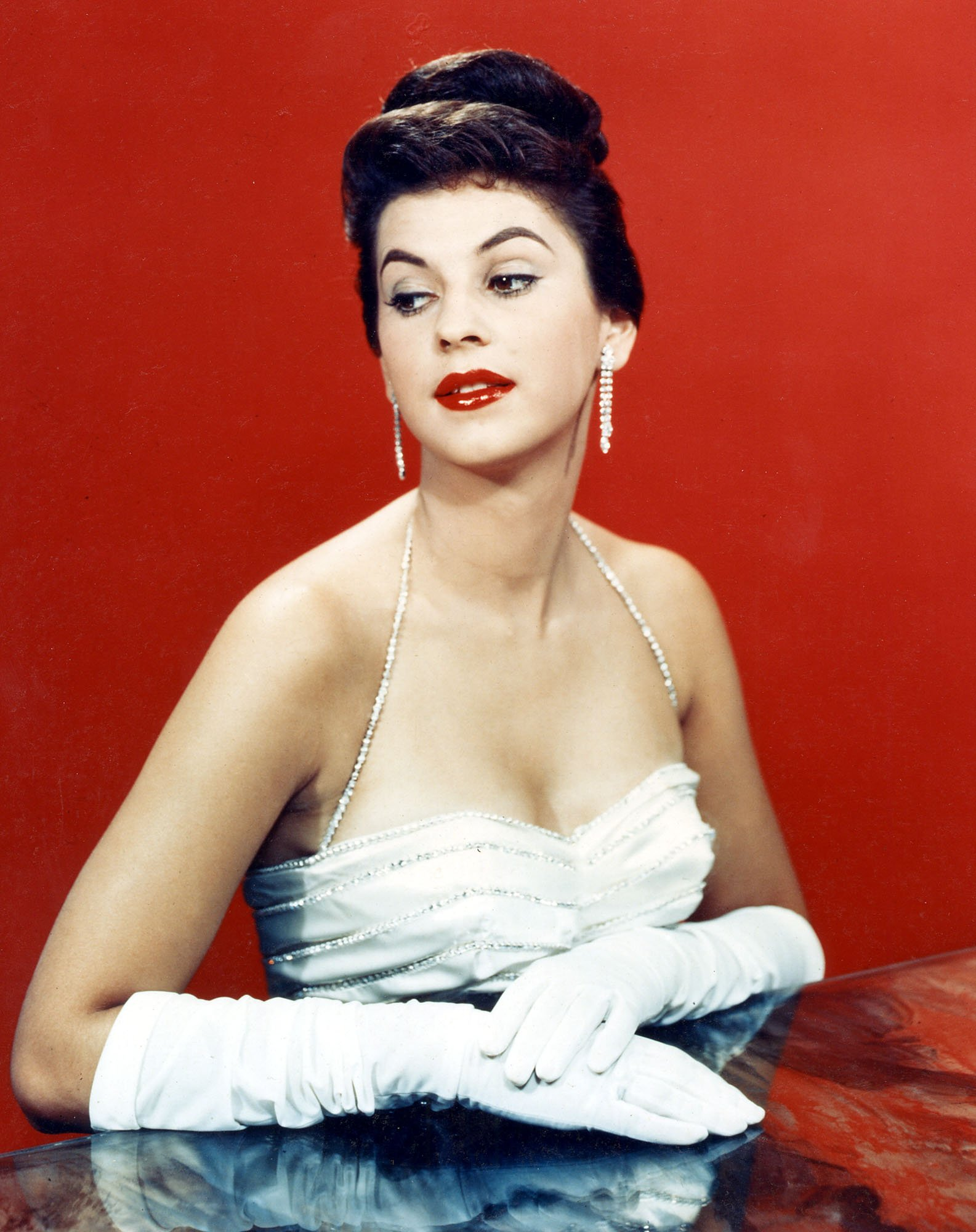
- Zuluaga in 1958
- Born: Luz Marina Zuluaga Zuluaga; October 31, 1938; Manizales, Caldas, Colombia
- Died: December 2, 2015 (aged 77); Manizales, Colombia
- Height: 5 ft 4 in (163 cm)
- Beauty pageant titleholder
- Title: Miss Caldas 1957; Miss Colombia 1958; Miss Universe 1958
- Hair color: Light Brownn
- Eye color: Dark Brown
- Major competitions: Miss Colombia 1957 (1st Runner-Up); Miss Colombia 1958 (Winner) (Note: Zuluaga was originally first Runner-Up, but became Miss Colombia after the original titleholder, Doris Gil Santamaria, was forced to resign due to having been married.); Miss Universe 1958 (Winner)

Luz Marina Zuluaga Zuluaga (Spanish pronunciation: [suˈlwaɣa]; October 31, 1938 – December 2, 2015) was a Colombian beauty pageant titleholder who won Miss Universe 1958. She was the only Colombian woman to win the Miss Universe pageant until Paulina Vega became Miss Universe 2014.

== Biography ==
Zuluaga was born in Manizales, Colombia (Department of Caldas) and grew up there. She applied for the Miss Caldas contest, and she won in 1957. Zuluaga went on with her training towards the Miss Colombia contest and arrived in Cartagena, hoping to win the Miss Colombia title. Pereira is part of the Caldas department. Risaralda was made a department in 1966 some years after her election. She won the titles Miss Pereira, Miss Caldas, Miss Colombia Virreina (1st Runner up), Miss Colombia — Winner and then Miss Universe.

== Miss Colombia 1957 ==
Zuluaga finished as first runner-up. However the winner, Doris Gil Santamaria got married. Due to Miss Universe rules stating that no contestant can be married, Santamaria was forced to resign, making Zuluaga Miss Colombia by default.

== Miss Universe 1958 ==
The contest took place in Long Beach, California, on July 25, 1958. After Zuluaga was announced as the new Miss Universe, the only television station and most radio stations in Colombia at the time (as many as seventy-three) halted their regular programming to report the breaking news. The evening gown she wore in the pageant was designed and made for her by Colombian designer Aura Leonor Troya de Sánchez, who was a designer to the stars including at least three Miss Colombias.

Zuluaga was not immediately able to return home to her country. Miss Universe personnel feared for her safety because at the time Colombia was going through a period of extreme political volatility. When she finally returned home, she was welcomed by large crowds both at El Dorado International Airport in Bogotá and at Manizales airport.

By then, the citizens of Manizales accepted her as if she were a native of the area. Learning that her family was not well off economically, many citizens collected money, which was used to build a better house for Zuluaga and her family.

== Life after the title ==
After years outside the spotlight, Zuluaga made headlines again when she married a medical doctor and moved to the United States. In 1966, she returned to Manizales and became involved with the city council as well as with the state's institute of tourism, of which she eventually became director.

Zuluaga had three sons and a daughter. She died on December 2, 2015, at the age of 77 at her home in Manizales.

== Notes ==
Awards and achievements
Preceded by (Peru) Gladys Zender	Miss Universe; 1958	Succeeded by (Japan) Akiko Kojima
Preceded by Doris Gil Santamaria (resigned)	Miss Colombia; 1957	Succeeded by Stella Márquez
