= Miss Universe 1985 =

34th Miss Universe pageant

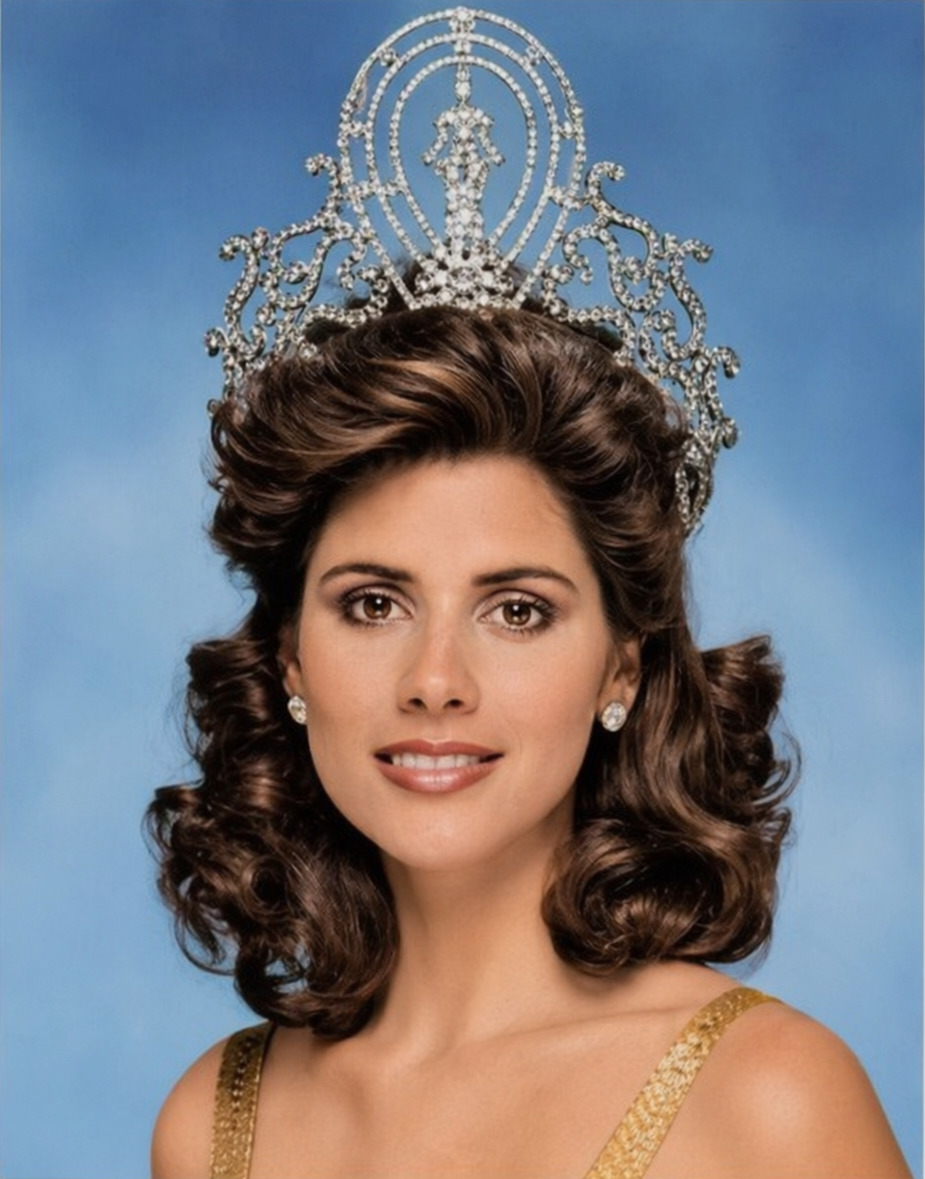
- Deborah Carthy
- Date: 15 July 1985
- Presenters: Bob Barker; Joan Van Ark
- Entertainment: John Denver; Clint Holmes
- Venue: James L. Knight Convention Center, Miami, Florida, United States
- Broadcaster: CBS (WTVJ)
- Entrants: 79
- Placements: 10
- Debuts: Dominica
- Withdrawals: Aruba; French Guiana; Guadeloupe; Martinique; Namibia; South Africa; Switzerland; Turkey
- Returns: Bahamas; French Polynesia; Haiti; Senegal; Sri Lanka
- Winner: Deborah Carthy; Puerto Rico
- Congeniality: Lucy Montinola (Guam)
- Best National Costume: Sandra Borda (Colombia)
- Photogenic: Brigitte Bergman (Holland)

Miss Universe 1985 was the 34th Miss Universe pageant, held at the James L. Knight Convention Center in Miami, Florida, on 15 July 1985. Seventy-nine contestants competed in the pageant. At the conclusion of the event, Deborah Carthy of Puerto Rico was crowned by Yvonne Ryding of Sweden.

== Background ==
=== Location and date ===
In October 1984, the owners of the newly expanded West Edmonton Mall in Edmonton, Alberta, Canada showed an interest in hosting the Miss Universe 1985 pageant there. This followed an unsuccessful attempt to host the Miss Universe 1984 pageant in Calgary Alberta the previous year.

Pageant organizers chose to host the pageant in Miami, Florida for the second consecutive year. George Honchar, president of Miss Universe Inc., expressed disappointment at a lack of local support for the event, which cost the city $2 million.

=== Selection of participants ===
In April, 1985 the city of Miami requested that the Miss Universe organization insist that South Africa should not send a representative to pageant, due to the threat of demonstrations over her country's Apartheid policy. In mid May the nation announced that they would not send their titleholder, Andrea Steltzer, to the pageant because of fears for her safety. This was the first time since 1975 that the country did not participate in the pageant; they would not return to the event until 1995. Andrea Steltzer (half South African and half German) took part as Miss Germany in the 1989 Miss Universe pageant where she was a semi-finalist.

== Results ==
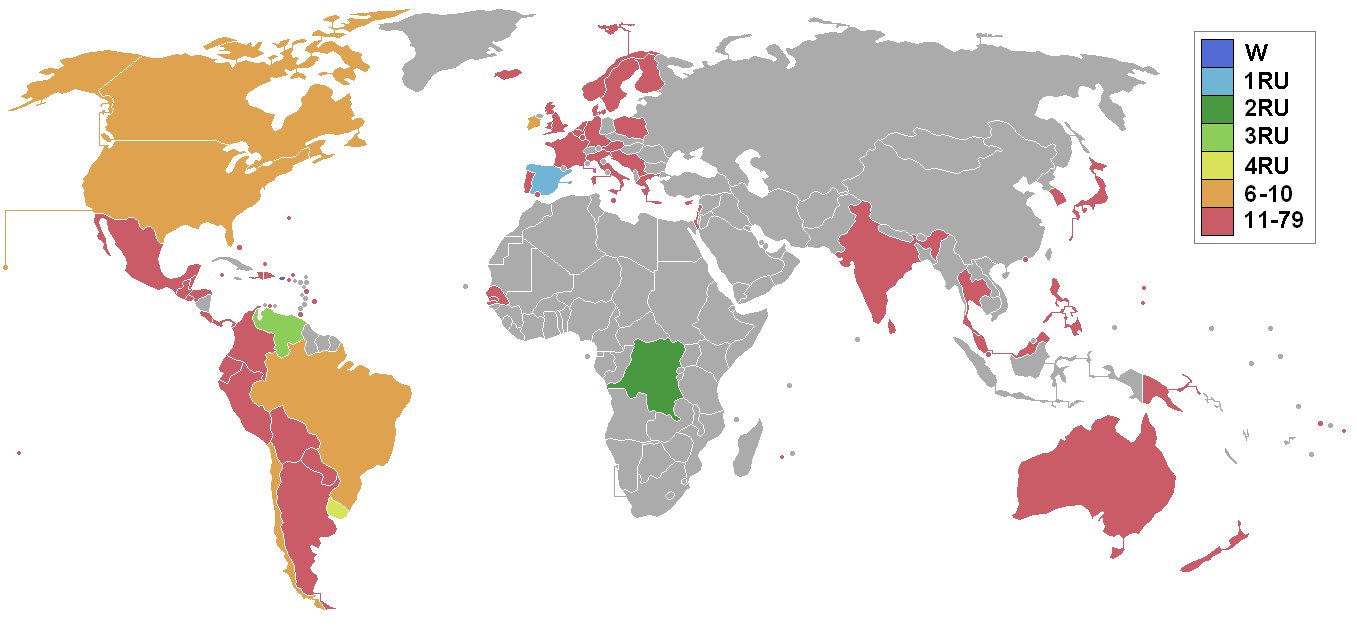
Miss Universe 1985 participating nations and results

=== Placements ===
Placement	Contestant
Miss Universe 1985	Puerto Rico – Deborah Carthy
1st Runner-Up	Spain – Teresa Sánchez López
2nd Runner-Up	Zaire – Benita Murekatete
3rd Runner-Up	Venezuela – Silvia Martínez
4th Runner-Up	Uruguay – Andrea Beatriz López
Top 10	Brazil – Márcia Gabrielle; Canada – Karen Tilley; Chile – Claudia van Sint Jan; Ireland – Olivia Tracey; United States – Laura Martinez-Herring

== Contestants ==
- Argentina – Yanina Castaño
- Australia – Elizabeth Rowly
- Austria – Martina Haiden
- Bahamas – Cleopatra Adderly
- Barbados – Elizabeth Wadman
- Belgium – Anne van der Broeck
- Belize – Jennifer Woods
- Bermuda – Jannell Ford
- Bolivia – Gabriela Orozco
- Brazil – Márcia Gabrielle
- British Virgin Islands – Jennifer Leonora Penn
- Canada – Karen Tilley
- Cayman Islands – Emily Hurston
- Chile – Claudia van Sint Jan
- Colombia – Sandra Borda
- Cook Islands – Essie Mokotupu
- Costa Rica – Rosibel Chacón
- Curaçao – Sheida Weber
- Cyprus – Andri Andreou
- Denmark – Susan Rasmussen
- Dominica – Margaret Rose Cools-Lartigue
- Dominican Republic – Melba Vicens
- Ecuador – María Elena Stangl
- El Salvador – Julia Haydee Mora
- England – Helen Westlake
- Finland – Marja Kinnunen
- France – Suzanne Iskandar
- Gambia – Batura Jallow
- Gibraltar – Karina Hollands
- Greece – Sabina Damianidis
- Guam – Lucy Carbollido Montinola
- Guatemala – Perla Prera
- Haiti – Arielle Jeanty
- Holland – Brigitte Bergman
- Honduras – Diana García
- Hong Kong – Shallin Tse
- Iceland – Hana Bryndís Jónsdóttir
- India – Sonu Walia
- Ireland – Olivia Tracey
- Israel – Hilla Kelmann
- Italy – Beatrice Popi
- Japan – Hatsumi Furusawa
- Lebanon – Joyce Sahab
- Luxembourg – Gabrielle Chiarini
- Malaysia – Agnes Chin
- Malta – Fiona Micallef
- Mexico – Yolanda Cádenas
- New Zealand – Claire Glenister
- Northern Mariana Islands – Antoinette Flores
- Norway – Karen Moe
- Panama – Janette Vásquez
- Papua New Guinea – Carmel Vagi
- Paraguay – Beverly Ocampo
- Peru – María Gracia Galleno
- Philippines – Joyce Burton
- Poland – Katarzyna Zawidzka
- Portugal – Alexandra Gomes
- Puerto Rico – Deborah Carthy
- Réunion – Dominique de Lort Serignan
- Scotland – Jackie Hendrie
- Senegal – Chantal Loubelo
- Singapore – Lyana Chiok
- South Korea – Young-ok Choi
- Spain – Teresa Sánchez López
- Sri Lanka – Ramani Bartholomeusz
- Sweden – Carina Marklund
- Tahiti – Hinarii Kilian
- Thailand – Tarntip Pongsuk
- Trinidad and Tobago – Brenda Joy Fahey
- Turks and Caicos Islands – Miriam Adams
- United States – Laura Martinez-Herring
- United States Virgin Islands – Mudite Alda Henderson
- Uruguay – Andrea Beatriz López
- Venezuela – Silvia Martínez
- Wales – Barbara Christian
- West Germany – Stefanie Roth
- Western Samoa – Tracy Mihaljevich
- Yugoslavia – Dinka Delić
- Zaire – Benita Murekatete
