= Jakelyne Oliveira =

Brazilian model and Miss Brasil 2013

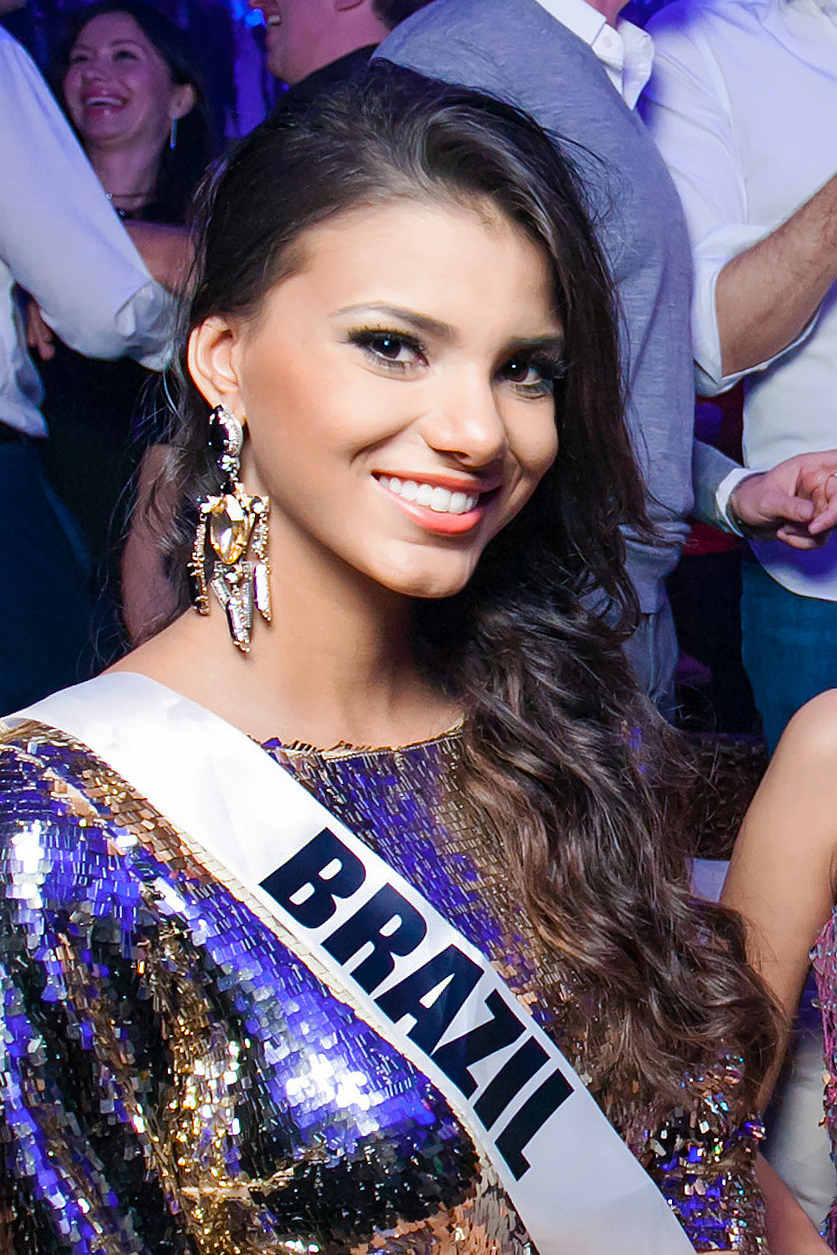
- Born: Jakelyne de Oliveira Silva; March 18, 1993 (age 33); Rondonópolis, Mato Grosso, Brazil
- Other name: Jakelyne de Oliveira Silva
- Height: 1.73 m (5 ft 8 in)
- Beauty pageant titleholder
- Title: Miss Globe International 2012; Miss Brazil 2013
- Hair color: Brown
- Eye color: Brown
- Major competitions: Miss Globe International 2012 (Winner); Miss Brazil 2013 (Winner); Miss Universe 2013 (4th Runner-Up)

Jakelyne de Oliveira Silva (born March 18, 1993, in Rondonópolis) is a Brazilian dancer, model and beauty pageant titleholder who was crowned Miss Brazil 2013 and represented her country at Miss Universe 2013 in Moscow, Russia. In September 2020 she joined the cast of the reality show A Fazenda.

== Early life ==
Oliveira is a model and student of Agricultural and Environmental Engineering.

== Pageantry ==
=== Miss Globe International 2012 ===
Oliveira won the Miss Globe International 2012 Pageant, being the fourth Brazilian who won this pageant

=== Miss Brazil 2013 ===
At Miss Brazil 2013, representing the state of Mato Grosso, Jakelyne defeated 26 other contestants and was crowned by Gabriela Markus on September 28, 2013.

=== Miss Universe 2013 ===
Jakelyne represented Brazil at Miss Universe 2013 on November 9 in Moscow, Russia where she finished as 4th Runner-Up, equaling the placement of her predecessor Gabriela Markus at Miss Universe 2012. Brazil placed in the Top 5 for the 3rd consecutive year.

Awards and achievements
Preceded by (Brazil) Gabriela Markus	Miss Universe 4th Runner-Up; 2013	Succeeded by (Jamaica) Kaci Fennell
Preceded by (Rio Grande do Sul) Gabriela Markus	Miss Universo Brasil; 2013	Succeeded by (Ceará) Melissa Gurgel
Preceded by Leticia Häuch	Miss Mato Grosso; 2013	Succeeded by Jéssica Rodrigues
