= Gabriela Markus =

Brazilian model, Miss Brasil 2012 (born 1988)

- Born: February 20, 1988 (age 38); Teutônia, Rio Grande do Sul, Brazil
- Height: 1.80 m (5 ft 11 in)
- Beauty pageant titleholder
- Title: Miss Rio Grande do Sul 2012; Miss Brazil 2012
- Hair color: Brown
- Eye color: Brown
- Major competitions: Miss Brazil 2012 (Winner); Miss Universe 2012 (4th Runner-Up)

Gabriela Markus (born February 20, 1988) is a Brazilian engineer, model, politician and beauty pageant titleholder who was crowned Miss Brazil 2012. She represented Brazil in Miss Universe 2012 finishing as 4th Runner-Up. .

== Personal life ==
Markus was born in Teutônia, Taquari Valley, in Rio Grande do Sul state to a German mother and a Portuguese father. She graduated with a degree in food engineering.

== Pageantry ==
=== Miss Rio Grande do Sul ===
Markus finished as first runner up in the Miss Rio Grande do Sul 2010, and was crowned Miss Rio Grande do Sul 2012.

=== Miss Brazil 2012 ===
Markus won the Miss Brazil beauty pageant on September 29, 2012, winning the twelfth title for Rio Grande do Sul and expanding the advantage of the state as the biggest winner in the history of the pageant.

=== Miss Universe 2012 ===
Markus placed fifth (fourth Runner-Up) behind (Australia) Renae Ayris, (Venezuela) Irene Esser, (Philippines) Janine Tugonon and the winner (USA) Olivia Culpo in the Miss Universe 2012 pageant on December 19, 2012. In addition, she also placed fifth in the national costume competition.

Awards and achievements
Preceded by (China) Luo Zilin	Miss Universe 4th Runner-Up; 2012	Succeeded by (Brazil) Jakelyne Oliveira
Preceded by (Rio Grande do Sul) Priscila Machado	Miss Universo Brasil; 2012	Succeeded by (Mato Grosso) Jakelyne Oliveira
Preceded by Priscila Machado	Miss Rio Grande do Sul; 2012	Succeeded by Vitória Sulczinski
