= Deborah Carthy Deu =

Puerto Rican beauty pageant titleholder (born 1966)

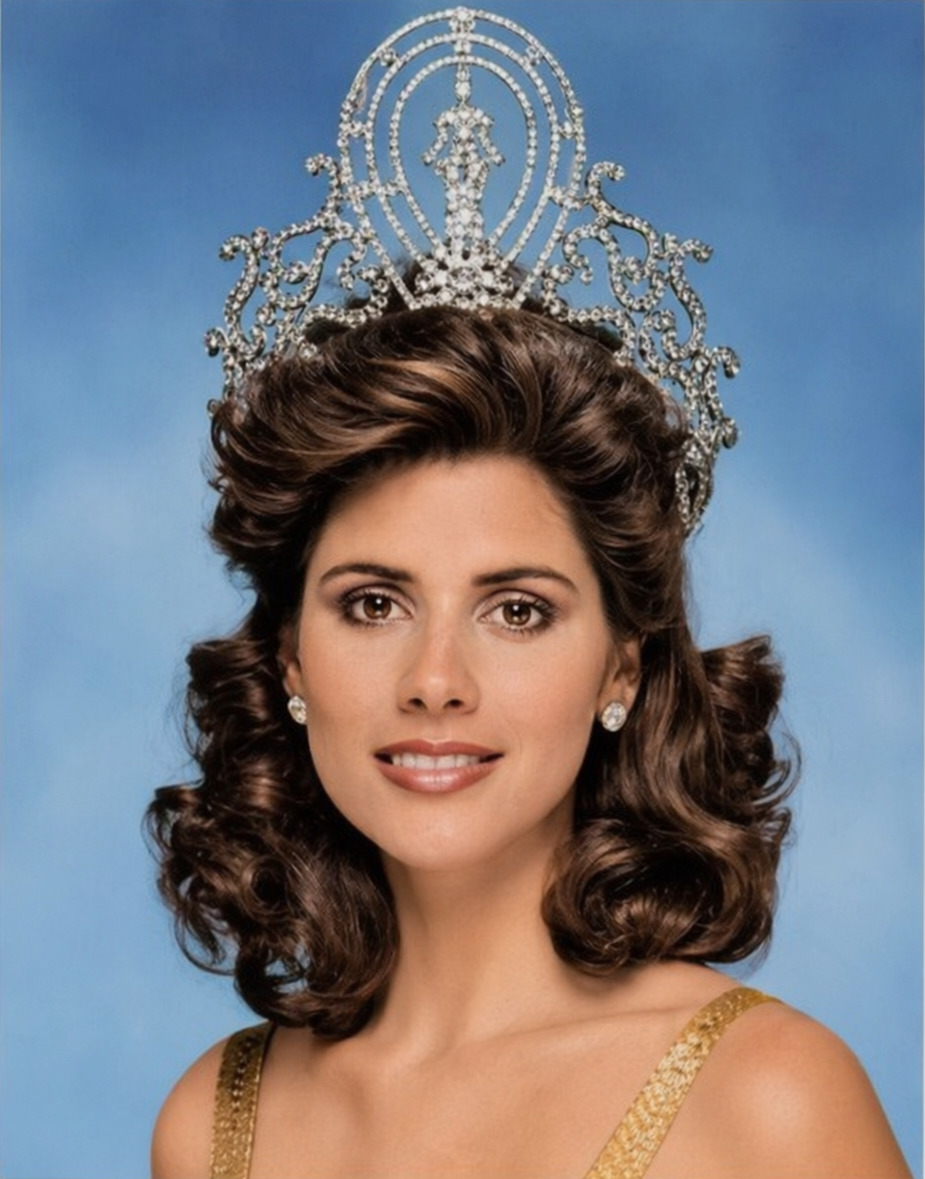
- Carthy-Deu in 1985
- Born: Deborah Fátima Carthy Deu; January 5, 1966 (age 60); Santurce, Puerto Rico
- Height: 5 ft (1.5 m)
- Beauty pageant titleholder
- Title: Miss San Juan 1985; Miss Puerto Rico 1985; Miss Universe 1985
- Hair color: Light Brown
- Eye color: Green
- Major competitions: Miss Puerto Rico 1985 (Winner); Miss Universe 1985 (Winner)

Deborah Fátima Carthy Deu (born January 5, 1966) is a Puerto Rican actress, television host and beauty queen who was crowned Miss Universe 1985. She was the second Puerto Rican to win Miss Universe since Marisol Malaret in 1970.

== Early life ==
Deborah Carthy Deu was born on January 5, 1966, in the Santurce district of San Juan to Ramón Carthy Sanchez and Vicky Sanz Deu, of Irish and Spaniard-Puerto Rican descent. Her mother directed an academy for ballet and modeling, Academia de Ballet y Modelaje Vicky Sanz, under the name of Vicky Sanz. Her father was a photography director. At age nine she started taking ballet lessons at her mother's school and was trained as a classical ballerina. She attended a Catholic elementary school and later enrolled in the ninth grade at Commonwealth High School. From age thirteen, she spent her summers in New York City taking dance classes. She later attended the University of Puerto Rico and pursued a major in drama. At thirteen, she also auditioned for Ballet Concierto and became part of the dance company and later a soloist.

== Miss Universe ==
While she was in college, she was selected Miss San Juan on March 22, 1985, and Miss Puerto Rico on April 27, 1985. On July 15, 1985, she was crowned Miss Universe 1985, representing Puerto Rico in Miami, Florida.

After traveling the world as Miss Universe, she went to Argentina to play the leading character in the telenovela El Cisne Blanco. This allowed her to continue working as an actress and a model internationally, as well as a television host for both Univision and Telemundo Network.

== After Miss Universe ==
Carthy Deu graduated magna cum laude from the University of Puerto Rico and obtained the Theater Medal, awarded to the most distinguished graduate. She majored in theater arts and education.

As an actress, she has worked both in theater and television and has earned the respect of critics for her participation, both in comedies and dramas.

She owns a modeling and finishing school, known as Deborah Carthy Deu Estudio y Agencia de Modelos, in which she helps girls and women to develop social skills and self-esteem, as well as to start careers in modeling, the arts, television and participation in beauty pageants.

Carthy Deu has hosted several television shows in Puerto Rico, New York and Miami, working for both Univision and the Telemundo network on television programs such as Noche de Gala, (Gala Night Ball) with Eddie Miró, Desde Mi Pueblo, (From My Town) with Yoyo Boing and Tony Croatto, and La Buena Vida.

She wrote a column for The San Juan Star as well as a fashion review in the entertainment magazine Teve Guia until the publication closed.

From 2007 to 2009, Carthy Deu hosted a remake of Noche de Gala, produced by Paquito Cordero and broadcast by WIPR-TV.

Since 2003, she has been a fashion contributor for WAPA's newscast Noticentro Al Amanecer.

== Personal life ==
In October 2009, she gave birth to son Luke in San Juan.

== See also ==
- List of Puerto Ricans
- Irish immigration to Puerto Rico
- History of women in Puerto Rico

Awards and achievements
Preceded by (Sweden) Yvonne Ryding	Miss Universe; 1985	Succeeded by (Venezuela) Bárbara Palacios
Preceded by Sandra Beauchamp	Miss Puerto Rico; 1985	Succeeded by Elizabeth Robison
