= List of Miss Universe scorings =

The following is a list of the scores obtained during the Miss Universe competition.

== Methodological selection ==
Over the time, Miss Universe has established different evaluation processes. From its first edition in 1952 until the 26th edition in 1977, the scores issued during the final telecast by the selection committee were not made public.

Final telecast

Beginning in 1978, the scores issued by the selection committee were broadcast live for the first time by the CBS television network. The selection process was characterized by the average of the scores, cumulative by round, both in swimsuit, evening gown (until 2002), and interview (until 1999).

Furthermore, from the 1990s to 2000, the scores of each member of the selection committee were made public individually. Similarly, the Top 5 or 6 finalists from that decade were subjected to a final interview, which was televised only since 1992.

Starting in 2003 in conjunction with the switch to NBC television network, the rounds in each competition area were eliminatory rather than cumulative. However, the scores were not made public again until 2007 through 2010.

Since 2011, both the scores and the evaluation system used by the selection committee have not been made public again. However, there have been certain exceptions. In 2011, although the jury's scores were not televised, the scores previously given by the fans on the pageant's website were broadcast, even though these had no impact on the final result or the candidates' ranking. Meanwhile, in 2013, through the app "You be the Judge," fans were able to compare their own scores with those given by the selection committee live; being evident again the average between the swimsuit and evening gown rounds.

Preliminary competition

The preliminary swimsuit and evening gown competition scores were released from the 1979 through 1997 editions, with the exception of the 1985 and 1989 editions. Interview scores were subsequently included starting in 1990.

== Swimsuit ==
The following is a list of the scores obtained during the swimsuit competition (1978–2002; 2007–2010; 2013 (Note: The Miss Universe 2013 scores were not televised live worldwide; being only published during the pageant's broadcast via the "You be the Judge" app, accessible through the pageant's website, where users could compare their personal scores with those issued by the selection committee. Despite this, the scores were televised only in the US during the NBC delayed telecast.)) in Miss Universeː

Color key

- Declared as winner
- Ended as runner-up
- Ended as top 5/6 qualification
- Ended as one of the finalists or semifinalists

#	Year	Country/Territory	Contestant	Score	Placement
1	2002	Russia	Oxana Fedorova	9.886 (1)	Miss Universe 2002 (dethroned)
2	1998	Venezuela	Veruska Ramírez	9.855 (1)	1st Runner-Up
3	1996	Venezuela	Alicia Machado	9.820 (1)	Miss Universe 1996
4	1998	Trinidad and Tobago	Wendy Fitzwilliam	9.762 (2)	Miss Universe 1998
5	1994	Venezuela	Minorka Mercado	9.752 (1)	2nd Runner-Up
6	1996	Aruba	Taryn Mansell	9.737 (2)	1st Runner-Up
7	1989	Netherlands	Angela Visser	9.725 (1)	Miss Universe 1989
8	1994	India	Sushmita Sen	9.722 (2)	Miss Universe 1994
9	1995	United States	Chelsi Smith	9.719 (1)	Miss Universe 1995
10	1996	Russia	Ilmira Shamsutdinova	9.714 (3)	Top 6
11	1998	Puerto Rico	Joyce Giraud	9.697 (3)	2nd Runner-Up
12	1988	Thailand	Porntip Nakhirunkanok	9.684 (1)	Miss Universe 1988
13	1996	Finland	Lola Odusoga	9.657 (4)	2nd Runner-Up
14	1994	Colombia	Carolina Gómez	9.638 (3)	1st Runner-Up
15	1998	United States	Shawnae Jebbia	9.625 (4)	Top 5
16	1993	Australia	Voni Delfos	9.624 (1)	Top 6
17	1997	Curaçao	Verna Vasquez	9.623 (1)	Top 6
18	1996	India	Sandhya Chib	9.619 (5)	Top 10
19	2001	Puerto Rico	Denise Quiñones	9.617 (1)	Miss Universe 2001
20	1997	Italy	Denny Méndez	9.614 (2)	Top 6
21	1996	Peru	Natali Sacco	9.613 (6)	Top 10
22	1996	Mexico	Vanessa Guzmán	9.604 (7)	Top 6
23	1996	United States	Ali Landry	9.601 (8)	Top 6
24	2007	Japan	Riyo Mori	9.599 (1)	Miss Universe 2007
25	1995	Canada	Lana Buchberger	9.598 (2)	2nd Runner-Up
26	1998	Colombia	Silvia Fernanda Ortiz	9.583 (5)	Top 5
27	1996	Sweden	Annika Duckmark	9.576 (9)	Top 10
28	1995	Dominican Republic	Cándida Lara	9.573 (3)	Top 10
29	1996	El Salvador	Milena Mayorga	9.569 (10)	Top 10
30	1987	Chile	Cecilia Bolocco	9.569 (1)	Miss Universe 1987
31	1995	Venezuela	Denyse Floreano	9.566 (4)	Top 6
32	1995	Puerto Rico	Desiree Lowry	9.561 (5)	Top 6
33	2007	Brazil	Natália Guimarães	9.560 (2)	1st Runner-Up
34	1995	Trinidad and Tobago	Arlene Peterkin	9.515 (6)	Top 6
35	1994	United States	Lu Parker	9.510 (4)	Top 6
36	1997	United States	Brook Lee	9.500 (3)	Miss Universe 1997
37	1997	Venezuela	Marena Bencomo	9.471 (4)	1st Runner-Up
38	1988	South Korea	Chang Yoon-jung	9.463 (2)	1st Runner-Up
39	1984	Sweden	Yvonne Ryding	9.460 (1)	Miss Universe 1984
40	2007	South Korea	Honey Lee	9.458 (3)	3rd Runner-Up
41	2001	Greece	Evelina Papantoniou	9.450 (2)	1st Runner-Up
42	1998	Brazil	Michella Marchi	9.450 (6)	Top 10
43	1991	Mexico	Lupita Jones	9.450 (1)	Miss Universe 1991
44	1994	Slovakia	Silvia Lakatošová	9.447 (5)	Top 6
45	2000	India	Lara Dutta	9.440 (1)	Miss Universe 2000
46	2008	Colombia	Taliana Vargas	9.433 (1)	1st Runner-Up
47	2013	Philippines	Ariella Arida	9.430 (1)	3rd Runner-Up
48	1995	Colombia	Tatiana Castro	9.430 (7)	Top 10
49	2010	Jamaica	Yendi Phillips	9.426 (1)	1st Runner-Up
50	1994	Philippines	Charlene Gonzales	9.425 (6)	Top 6
51	2013	Venezuela	Gabriela Isler	9.417 (2)	Miss Universe 2013
52	1991	Venezuela	Jackeline Rodríguez	9.412 (2)	Top 6
53	1987	Italy	Roberta Capua	9.383 (2)	1st Runner-Up
54	1986	United States	Christy Fichtner	9.380 (1)	1st Runner-Up
55	1995	India	Manpreet Brar	9.378 (8)	1st Runner-Up
56	2001	United States	Kandace Krueger	9.375 (3)	2nd Runner-Up
57	2000	Venezuela	Claudia Moreno	9.370 (2)	1st Runner-Up
58	1997	Estonia	Kristiina Heinmets	9.357 (5)	Top 10
59	1992	Venezuela	Carolina Izsak	9.357 (1)	Top 6
60	1995	South Africa	Augustine Masilela	9.348 (9)	Top 10
61	1999	Spain	Diana Nogueira	9.338 (1)	2nd Runner-Up
62	1993	Venezuela	Milka Chulina	9.336 (2)	2nd Runner-Up
63	1983	United States	Julie Hayek	9.333 (1)	1st Runner-Up
64	1985	Spain	Teresa Sánchez López	9.331 (1)	1st Runner-Up
65	2008	Venezuela	Dayana Mendoza	9.327 (2)	Miss Universe 2008
66	1999	Philippines	Miriam Quiambao	9.325 (2)	1st Runner-Up
67	1999	South Africa	Sonia Raciti	9.325 (2)	Top 5
68	1994	Italy	Arianna David	9.325 (7)	Top 10
69	1992	India	Madhushri Sapre	9.321 (2)	2nd Runner-Up
70	2000	Canada	Kim Yee	9.310 (3)	Top 5
71	1995	El Salvador	Eleonora Carrillo	9.305 (10)	Top 10
72	2002	Venezuela	Cynthia Lander	9.290 (2)	4th Runner-Up
73	1994	Greece	Rea Toutounzi	9.288 (8)	Top 10
74	1993	Czech Republic	Pavlina Barbukova	9.286 (3)	Top 10
75	2001	India	Celina Jaitley	9.280 (4)	4th Runner-Up
76	1992	Netherlands	Vivian Jansen	9.280 (3)	Top 6
77	1984	Venezuela	Carmen María Montiel	9.280 (2)	2nd Runner-Up
78	1997	Trinidad and Tobago	Margot Bourgeois	9.271 (6)	2nd Runner-Up
79	1993	Colombia	Paula Andrea Betancourt	9.267 (4)	1st Runner-Up
80	2010	Mexico	Ximena Navarrete	9.265 (2)	Miss Universe 2010
81	2009	Australia	Rachael Finch	9.264 (1)	3rd Runner-Up
82	1987	United States	Michelle Royer	9.263 (3)	2nd Runner-Up
83	1983	England	Karen Moore	9.244 (2)	4th Runner-Up
84	1992	Namibia	Michelle McLean	9.243 (4)	Miss Universe 1992
85	1989	Sweden	Louise Drevenstam	9.233 (2)	1st Runner-Up
86	2001	Venezuela	Eva Ekvall	9.230 (5)	3rd Runner-Up
87	1997	Panama	Lía Victoria Borrero	9.229 (7)	Top 6
88	1991	Soviet Union	Julia Lemigova	9.225 (3)	2nd Runner-Up
89	2007	Tanzania	Flaviana Matata	9.223 (4)	Top 10
90	1992	Colombia	Paola Turbay	9.221 (5)	1st Runner-Up
91	1983	Switzerland	Lolita Morena	9.220 (3)	3rd Runner-Up
92	2013	Spain	Patricia Rodríguez	9.217 (3)	1st Runner-Up
93	1991	Jamaica	Kimberley Mais	9.213 (4)	Top 6
94	2008	United States	Crystle Stewart	9.207 (3)	Top 10
95	2013	Brazil	Jakelyne Oliveira	9.200 (4)	4th Runner-Up
96	1994	Switzerland	Patricia Fässler	9.197 (9)	Top 10
97	2009	Dominican Republic	Ada Aimée de la Cruz	9.189 (2)	1st Runner-Up
98	1999	Botswana	Mpule Kwelagobe	9.188 (4)	Miss Universe 1999
99	1983	New Zealand	Lorraine Downes	9.177 (4)	Miss Universe 1983
100	1983	Ireland	Roberta Brown	9.161 (5)	2nd Runner-Up
101	2001	Spain	Eva Sisó	9.160 (6)	Top 10
102	2008	Spain	Claudia Moro	9.150 (4)	Top 10
103	2007	Angola	Micaela Reis	9.150 (5)	Top 10
104	2002	Cyprus	Demetra Eleftheriou	9.150 (3)	Top 10
105	1998	Russia	Anna Malova	9.150 (7)	Top 10
106	1988	Mexico	Amanda Olivares	9.144 (3)	2nd Runner-Up
107	1999	Mexico	Silvia Salgado	9.143 (5)	Top 10
108	1984	Germany	Brigitte Berx	9.140 (3)	Top 10
109	1984	Philippines	Desiree Verdadero	9.140 (3)	3rd Runner-Up
110	1993	United States	Kenya Summer Moore	9.136 (5)	Top 6
111	1991	Curaçao	Jacqueline Krijger	9.135 (5)	Top 10
112	1979	Venezuela	Maritza Sayalero	9.135 (1)	Miss Universe 1979
113	1984	Thailand	Savinee Pakaranang	9.130 (5)	Top 10
114	1998	South Africa	Kerishnie Naiker	9.117 (8)	Top 10
115	1993	Puerto Rico	Dayanara Torres	9.114 (6)	Miss Universe 1993
116	1998	India	Lymaraina D'Souza	9.108 (9)	Top 10
117	1989	Poland	Joanna Gapinzka	9.105 (3)	3rd Runner-Up
118	2001	France	Élodie Gossuin	9.100 (7)	Top 10
119	2001	Nigeria	Agbani Darego	9.100 (7)	Top 10
120	2000	United States	Lynnette Cole	9.100 (4)	Top 5
121	1986	Venezuela	Bárbara Palacios	9.100 (2)	Miss Universe 1986
122	1983	Germany	Loana Radecki	9.094 (6)	Top 12
123	1999	Venezuela	Carolina Indriago	9.088 (6)	Top 5
124	1983	Venezuela	Paola Ruggeri	9.088 (7)	Top 12
125	1994	Sweden	Domenique Forsberg	9.078 (10)	Top 10
126	1991	Netherlands	Paulien Huizinga	9.073 (6)	1st Runner-Up
127	2008	Mexico	Elisa Nájera	9.071 (5)	4th Runner-Up
128	2000	Spain	Helen Lindes	9.070 (5)	2nd Runner-Up
129	1998	Ireland	Andrea Roche	9.050 (10)	Top 10
130	1997	India	Nafisa Joseph	9.043 (8)	Top 10
131	1997	Puerto Rico	Ana Rosa Brito	9.043 (8)	Top 10
132	1993	Finland	Tarja Smura	9.043 (7)	Top 10
133	2013	United States	Erin Brady	9.033 (5)	Top 10
134	2001	Israel	Ilanit Levy	9.030 (9)	Top 10
135	1979	Bermuda	Gina Swainson	9.027 (2)	1st Runner-Up
136	1981	Venezuela	Irene Sáez	9.024 (1)	Miss Universe 1981
137	2001	Russia	Oksana Kalandyrets	9.008 (10)	Top 10
138	1986	Poland	Brygida Bziukiewicz	9.000 (3)	3rd Runner-Up
139	2007	United States	Rachel Smith	8.995 (6)	4th Runner-Up
140	1991	Paraguay	Vivian Benítez	8.987 (7)	Top 10
141	1992	Belgium	Anke Van dermeersch	8.986 (6)	Top 6
142	2008	Dominican Republic	Marianne Cruz González	8.983 (6)	2nd Runner-Up
143	2007	Venezuela	Ly Jonaitis	8.971 (7)	2nd Runner-Up
144	2010	Philippines	Venus Raj	8.957 (3)	4th Runner-Up
145	1991	United States	Kelli McCarty	8.950 (8)	Top 6
146	1984	Netherlands	Nancy Neede	8.950 (6)	Top 10
147	1993	Brazil	Leila Schuster	8.936 (8)	Top 10
148	1997	Sweden	Victoria Lagerström	8.929 (10)	Top 10
149	1990	Norway	Mona Grudt	8.922 (1)	Miss Universe 1990
150	1983	Italy	Federica Moro	8.922 (8)	Top 12
151	2013	United Kingdom	Amy Willerton	8.917 (6)	Top 10
152	2002	South Africa	Vanessa Carreira	8.900 (4)	3rd Runner-Up
153	2000	Estonia	Evelyn Mikomägi	8.900 (6)	Top 10
154	1988	Venezuela	Yajaira Vera	8.900 (4)	Top 10
155	1989	United States	Gretchen Polhemus	8.894 (4)	2nd Runner-Up
156	1983	Finland	Nina Rekola	8.888 (9)	Top 12
157	1993	India	Namrata Shirodkar	8.886 (9)	Top 6
158	1989	Mexico	Adriana Abascal	8.883 (5)	4th Runner-Up
159	1981	Belgium	Dominike van Eeckhoudt	8.881 (2)	4th Runner-Up
160	2002	China	Zhuo Ling	8.880 (5)	2nd Runner-Up
161	1986	Finland	Tuula Polvi	8.880 (4)	4th Runner-Up
162	1999	Jamaica	Nicold Haughton	8.875 (7)	Top 10
163	1991	Yugoslavia	Nataša Pavlović	8.875 (9)	Top 10
164	2013	Ecuador	Constanza Báez	8.867 (7)	2nd Runner-Up
165	2013	India	Manasi Moghe	8.867 (7)	Top 10
166	2013	Ukraine	Olga Storozhenko	8.867 (7)	Top 10
167	1991	France	Maréva Georges	8.867 (10)	Top 10
168	1988	Japan	Mizuho Sakaguchi	8.866 (5)	3rd Runner-Up
169	1992	Australia	Georgina Denahy	8.857 (7)	Top 10
170	1984	Guatemala	Ilma Urrutia	8.820 (7)	Top 10
171	2002	Germany	Natascha Börger	8.810 (6)	Top 10
172	1986	Brazil	Deise Nunes de Souza	8.810 (5)	Top 10
173	1985	Uruguay	Andrea López	8.805 (2)	4th Runner-Up
174	1999	Puerto Rico	Brenda Liz Lopez	8.800 (8)	Top 10
175	1993	Spain	Eugenia Santana	8.800 (10)	Top 10
176	1987	Puerto Rico	Laurie Simpson	8.800 (4)	4th Runner-Up
177	2013	Dominican Republic	Yaritza Reyes	8.792 (10)	Top 10
178	2009	Kosovo	Gona Dragusha	8.790 (3)	2nd Runner-Up
179	2002	Panama	Justine Pasek	8.790 (7)	Miss Universe 2002 (succeeded)
180	1999	Ghana	Akuba Cudjoe	8.788 (9)	Top 10
181	1989	Jamaica	Sandra Foster	8.788 (6)	Top 10
182	2010	Ireland	Rozanna Purcell	8.784 (4)	Top 10
183	1999	India	Gul Panag	8.774 (10)	Top 10
184	1983	Singapore	Kathie Lee	8.766 (10)	Top 12
185	1979	Brazil	Martha Jussara da Costa	8.764 (3)	3rd Runner-Up
186	2009	Venezuela	Stefanía Fernández	8.760 (4)	Miss Universe 2009
187	1992	New Zealand	Lisa Maree de Montalk	8.743 (8)	Top 10
188	2000	Zimbabwe	Corinne Crewe	8.740 (7)	Top 10
189	1986	Switzerland	Eveline Glanzmann	8.740 (6)	Top 10
190	1989	Germany	Andrea Stelzer	8.737 (7)	Top 10
191	1989	Venezuela	Lisa Ljung	8.727 (8)	Top 10
192	1992	United States	Shannon Marketic	8.721 (9)	Top 10
193	1980	United States	Shawn Weatherly	8.718 (1)	Miss Universe 1980
194	2013	Costa Rica	Fabiana Granados	8.717 (11)	Top 16
195	1990	Colombia	Lizeth Mahecha	8.714 (2)	2nd Runner-Up
196	1985	Democratic Republic of the Congo	Benita Mureka Tete	8.705 (3)	2nd Runner-Up
197	1982	Guam	Patty Chong Kerkos	8.692 (1)	1st Runner-Up
198	1988	Dominican Republic	Patricia Jiménez	8.688 (6)	Top 10
199	1992	Sweden	Monica Brodd	8.686 (10)	Top 10
200	1984	United States	Mai Shanley	8.670 (8)	Top 10
201	1988	Hong Kong	Pauline Yeung	8.666 (7)	4th Runner-Up
202	1989	Finland	Åsa Lövdahl	8.661 (9)	Top 10
203	2000	Colombia	Catalina Acosta	8.660 (8)	Top 10
204	2009	France	Chloé Mortaud	8.640 (5)	Top 10
205	1984	South Africa	Leticia Snyman	8.635 (9)	1st Runner-Up
206	2013	Puerto Rico	Monic Pérez	8.633 (12)	Top 16
207	1987	Venezuela	Inés María Calero	8.630 (5)	3rd Runner-Up
208	1988	United States	Courtney Gibbs	8.621 (8)	Top 10
209	1986	Colombia	María Mónica Urbina	8.620 (7)	2nd Runner-Up
210	2009	Switzerland	Whitney Toyloy	8.611 (6)	Top 10
211	1987	Philippines	Geraldine Asis	8.603 (6)	Top 10
212	2000	France	Sonia Rolland	8.600 (9)	Top 10
213	1979	England	Carolyn Seaward	8.591 (4)	2nd Runner-Up
214	1988	Colombia	Diana Arévalo	8.588 (9)	Top 10
215	1986	Democratic Republic of the Congo	Aimée Dobala	8.580 (8)	Top 10
216	1983	Spain	Ana Herrero	8.577 (11)	Top 12
217	2007	India	Puja Gupta	8.548 (8)	Top 10
218	2010	Australia	Jesinta Campbell	8.543 (5)	2nd Runner-Up
219	2000	South Africa	Heather Hamilton	8.540 (10)	Top 10
220	1985	Puerto Rico	Deborah Carthy-Deu	8.536 (4)	Miss Universe 1985
221	2009	Puerto Rico	Mayra Matos Pérez	8.533 (7)	4th Runner-Up
222	1984	Colombia	Susana Caldas	8.530 (10)	4th Runner-Up
223	2007	Mexico	Rosa María Ojeda	8.527 (9)	Top 10
224	1989	Chile	Macarena Mina	8.505 (10)	Top 10
225	1983	Norway	Karen Dobloug	8.505 (12)	Top 12
226	1990	Bolivia	Rosario Rico Toro	8.498 (3)	Top 6
227	1986	Chile	Mariana Villasante	8.490 (9)	Top 10
228	2009	South Africa	Tatum Keshwar	8.460 (8)	Top 10
229	1985	Venezuela	Silvia Martínez	8.455 (5)	3rd Runner-Up
230	1990	Mexico	Marilé del Rosario	8.450 (4)	Top 6
231	1990	Venezuela	Andreína Goetz	8.450 (4)	Top 10
232	2010	Puerto Rico	Mariana Vicente	8.443 (6)	Top 10
233	2013	Indonesia	Whulandary Herman	8.433 (13)	Top 16
234	1987	Turks and Caicos Islands	Carmelita Ariza	8.420 (7)	Top 10
235	1981	Brazil	Adriana Alves de Oliveira	8.416 (3)	3rd Runner-Up
236	2008	Russia	Vera Krasova	8.414 (7)	3rd Runner-Up
237	1990	Chile	Uranía Haltenhoff	8.410 (6)	Top 6
238	1987	Sweden	Suzanne Thörngren	8.405 (8)	Top 10
239	1980	New Zealand	Delyse Nottle	8.400 (2)	2nd Runner-Up
240	2009	Czech Republic	Iveta Lutovská	8.350 (9)	Top 10
241	2002	Albania	Anisa Kospiri	8.340 (8)	Top 10
242	2013	Switzerland	Dominique Rinderknecht	8.333 (14)	Top 16
243	2010	Ukraine	Anna Poslavska	8.333 (7)	3rd Runner-Up
244	1986	Puerto Rico	Elizabeth Robison	8.330 (10)	Top 10
245	1979	South Africa	Veronika Wilson	8.330 (5)	Top 12
246	1985	Chile	Claudia van Sint	8.326 (6)	Top 10
247	1985	Ireland	Olivia Tracey	8.325 (7)	Top 10
248	1982	Greece	Tina Roussou	8.325 (2)	3rd Runner-Up
249	2002	India	Neha Dhupia	8.320 (9)	Top 10
250	1990	United States	Carole Gist	8.299 (7)	1st Runner-Up
251	1979	Belize	Sarita Acosta	8.279 (6)	Top 12
252	1982	Canada	Karen Baldwin	8.275 (3)	Miss Universe 1982
253	1980	Scotland	Linda Gallagher	8.273 (3)	1st Runner-Up
254	2013	China	Jin Ye	8.267 (15)	Top 16
255	1980	Sweden	Eva Brigitta Andersson	8.250 (4)	4th Runner-Up
256	1990	India	Suzanne Sablok	8.233 (8)	Top 10
257	2010	Albania	Angela Martini	8.229 (8)	Top 10
258	2010	South Africa	Nicole Flint	8.229 (8)	Top 10
259	1980	Canada	Teresa MacKay	8.200 (5)	Top 12
260	1982	United States	Terri Utley	8.192 (4)	4th Runner-Up
261	2007	Nicaragua	Xiomara Blandino	8.171 (10)	Top 10
262	2007	Slovenia	Tjaša Kokalj	8.163 (11)	Top 15
263	1985	Canada	Karen Tilley	8.148 (8)	Top 10
264	1990	Turkey	Jülide Ateş	8.139 (9)	Top 10
265	1981	Tahiti	Tatiana Teraiamano	8.137 (4)	Top 12
266	1981	Canada	Dominique Dufour	8.133 (5)	1st Runner-Up
267	1979	Sweden	Annette Ekström	8.127 (7)	4th Runner-Up
268	2008	Kosovo	Zana Krasniqi	8.120 (8)	Top 10
269	1979	Scotland	Lorraine Davidson	8.118 (8)	Top 12
270	2007	Czech Republic	Lucie Hadasová	8.113 (12)	Top 15
271	2010	Guatemala	Jessica Scheel	8.071 (10)	Top 10
272	1982	Italy	Cinzia Fiordeponti	8.067 (5)	2nd Runner-Up
273	2009	United States	Kristen Dalton	8.060 (10)	Top 10
274	1987	Peru	Jessica Newton	8.055 (9)	Top 10
275	1981	Sweden	Eva-Lena Lundgren	8.050 (6)	2nd Runner-Up
276	1979	Argentina	Virginia Álvarez	8.045 (9)	Top 12
277	1981	Germany	Marion Kurz	8.041 (7)	Top 12
278	1980	Philippines	Maria Rosario Silayan	8.033 (6)	3rd Runner-Up
279	2013	Nicaragua	Nastassja Bolívar	8.017 (16)	Top 16
280	2002	Canada	Neelam Verma	7.990 (10)	Top 10
281	1988	Norway	Bente Brunland	7.977 (10)	Top 10
282	2007	Denmark	Žaklina Šojić	7.969 (13)	Top 15
283	1980	Iceland	Guðbjörg Sigurdardóttir	7.942 (7)	Top 12
284	2007	Thailand	Farung Yuthithum	7.940 (14)	Top 15
285	1987	Singapore	Marion Nicole Teo	7.940 (10)	Top 10
286	2009	Albania	Hasna Xhukiçi	7.900 (11)	Top 15
287	2007	Ukraine	Lyudmila Bikmullina	7.900 (15)	Top 15
288	1982	Brazil	Celice Marques	7.892 (6)	Top 12
289	1980	Puerto Rico	Agnes Tañón	7.892 (8)	Top 12
290	1979	Germany	Andrea Hontschik	7.882 (10)	Top 12
291	2009	Belgium	Zeynep Sever	7.870 (12)	Top 15
292	1980	Tahiti	Thilda Fuller	7.858 (9)	Top 12
293	1978	United States	Judi Andersen	7.855 (1)	1st Runner-Up
294	2010	Russia	Irina Antonenko	7.843 (11)	Top 15
295	2009	Sweden	Renate Cerljen	7.830 (13)	Top 15
296	1979	Wales	Janet Beverly Hobson	7.818 (11)	Top 12
297	2008	Australia	Laura Dundovic	7.814 (9)	Top 10
298	2009	Croatia	Sarah Ćosić	7.811 (14)	Top 15
299	1982	England	Della Dolan	7.808 (7)	Top 12
300	1990	Czechoslovakia	Jana Hronkova	7.785 (10)	Top 10
301	1980	South Korea	Kim Eun-jung	7.750 (10)	Top 12
302	1980	Panama	Gloria Karamañites	7.742 (11)	Top 12
303	2009	Iceland	Ingibjörg Egilsdóttir	7.730 (15)	Top 15
304	1980	Colombia	María Patricia Arbeláez	7.729 (12)	Top 12
305	1981	Norway	Mona Olsen	7.717 (8)	Top 12
306	1979	United States	Mary Therese Friel	7.709 (12)	Top 12
307	2008	Italy	Claudia Ferraris	7.671 (10)	Top 10
308	1985	Brazil	Márcia de Oliveira	7.658 (9)	Top 10
309	2010	Colombia	Natalia Navarro	7.643 (12)	Top 15
310	1981	Netherlands	Ingrid Schouten	7.633 (9)	Top 12
311	1981	United States	Kim Seelbrede	7.617 (10)	Top 12
312	2010	France	Malika Menard	7.586 (13)	Top 15
313	2010	Belgium	Cilou Annys	7.571 (14)	Top 15
314	1985	United States	Laura Harring	7.538 (10)	Top 10
315	1982	Peru	Francesca Zaza	7.508 (8)	Top 12
316	1981	New Zealand	Donella Thomsen	7.492 (11)	Top 12
317	2010	Czech Republic	Jitka Válková	7.429 (15)	Top 15
318	1982	Finland	Sari Aspholm	7.408 (9)	Top 12
319	2008	Czech Republic	Eliška Bučková	7.386 (11)	Top 15
320	1981	Ecuador	Lucía Vinueza	7.300 (12)	Top 12
321	1978	Sweden	Cécilia Rodhe	7.300 (2)	4th Runner-Up
322	2008	Hungary	Jázmin Dammak	7.229 (12)	Top 15
323	1982	South Africa	Odette Scrooby	7.225 (10)	Top 12
324	1982	Uruguay	Silvia Vila	7.167 (11)	Top 12
325	2008	South Africa	Tansey Coetzee	7.133 (13)	Top 15
326	2008	Japan	Hiroko Mima	7.100 (14)	Top 15
327	2008	Vietnam	Nguyễn Thùy Lâm	7.050 (15)	Top 15
328	1982	Germany	Kerstin Paeserack	7.008 (12)	Top 12
329	1978	Spain	Guillermina Ruiz	6.870 (3)	2nd Runner-Up
330	1978	South Africa	Margaret Gardiner	6.590 (4)	Miss Universe 1978
331	1978	Belgium	Françoise Moens	6.364 (5)	Top 12
332	1978	Colombia	Shirley Sáenz	6.282 (6)	3rd Runner-Up
333	1978	Chile	Marianne Müller	5.064 (7)	Top 12
334	1978	Israel	Dorit Jellinek	4.280 (8)	Top 12
335	1978	Ireland	Lorraine Enriquez	3.800 (9)	Top 12
336	1978	Peru	Olga Zumarán	3.718 (10)	Top 12
337	1978	Mexico	Alba Cervera	3.260 (11)	Top 12
338	1978	Netherlands	Karen Gustafsson	2.890 (12)	Top 12

== Evening gown ==
The following is a list of the scores obtained during the evening gown competition (1978–2002; 2007–2010; 2013) in Miss Universeː

Color key

- Declared as winner
- Ended as runner-up
- Ended as top 5/6 qualification
- Ended as one of the finalists or semifinalists

#	Year	Country/Territory	Contestant	Score	Placement
1	1994	Colombia	Carolina Gómez	9.897 (1)	1st Runner-Up
2	1996	Venezuela	Alicia Machado	9.874 (1)	Miss Universe 1996
3	1994	Venezuela	Minorka Mercado	9.843 (2)	2nd Runner-Up
4	1998	Trinidad and Tobago	Wendy Fitzwilliam	9.835 (1)	Miss Universe 1998
5	2008	Colombia	Taliana Vargas	9.829 (1)	1st Runner-Up
6	1989	Netherlands	Angela Visser	9.824 (1)	Miss Universe 1989
7	1993	Colombia	Paula Andrea Betancourt	9.815 (1)	1st Runner-Up
8	1997	Curaçao	Verna Vasquez	9.799 (1)	Top 6
9	1994	India	Sushmita Sen	9.792 (3)	Miss Universe 1994
10	1995	Canada	Lana Buchberger	9.789 (1)	2nd Runner-Up
11	1987	Chile	Cecilia Bolocco	9.765 (1)	Miss Universe 1987
12	1997	Italy	Denny Méndez	9.764 (2)	Top 6
13	1991	Mexico	Lupita Jones	9.758 (1)	Miss Universe 1991
14	1996	United States	Ali Landry	9.753 (2)	Top 6
15	1988	Thailand	Porntip Nakhirunkanok	9.752 (1)	Miss Universe 1988
16	1993	Australia	Voni Delfos	9.743 (2)	Top 6
17	2001	Puerto Rico	Denise Quiñones	9.742 (1)	Miss Universe 2001
18	1997	Venezuela	Marena Bencomo	9.729 (3)	1st Runner-Up
19	2013	Venezuela	Gabriela Isler	9.727 (1)	Miss Universe 2013
20	1998	Venezuela	Veruska Ramírez	9.720 (2)	1st Runner-Up
21	1994	Philippines	Charlene Gonzales	9.720 (4)	Top 6
22	1996	Finland	Lola Odusoga	9.719 (3)	2nd Runner-Up
23	1991	Soviet Union	Julia Lemigova	9.717 (2)	2nd Runner-Up
24	1996	Mexico	Vanessa Guzmán	9.714 (4)	Top 6
25	1994	Italy	Arianna David	9.708 (5)	Top 10
26	1995	Venezuela	Denyse Floreano	9.705 (2)	Top 6
27	1995	India	Manpreet Brar	9.700 (3)	1st Runner-Up
28	1994	Slovakia	Silvia Lakatošová	9.700 (6)	Top 6
29	2008	Venezuela	Dayana Mendoza	9.697 (2)	Miss Universe 2008
30	1994	United States	Lu Parker	9.697 (7)	Top 6
31	1998	Puerto Rico	Joyce Giraud	9.693 (3)	2nd Runner-Up
32	1995	South Africa	Augustine Masilela	9.688 (4)	Top 10
33	1997	United States	Brook Lee	9.683 (4)	Miss Universe 1997
34	1987	Italy	Roberta Capua	9.680 (2)	1st Runner-Up
35	1992	Venezuela	Carolina Izsak	9.679 (1)	Top 6
36	1995	Trinidad and Tobago	Arlene Peterkin	9.674 (5)	Top 6
37	2001	Greece	Evelina Papantoniou	9.667 (2)	1st Runner-Up
38	1995	Puerto Rico	Desiree Lowry	9.661 (6)	Top 6
39	1995	United States	Chelsi Smith	9.656 (7)	Miss Universe 1995
40	1996	Aruba	Taryn Mansell	9.651 (5)	1st Runner-Up
41	1996	El Salvador	Milena Mayorga	9.651 (5)	Top 10
42	1991	Venezuela	Jackeline Rodríguez	9.650 (3)	Top 6
43	1994	Sweden	Domenique Forsberg	9.643 (8)	Top 10
44	2002	Russia	Oxana Fedorova	9.640 (1)	Miss Universe 2002 (dethroned)
45	1996	Peru	Natali Sacco	9.637 (7)	Top 10
46	1998	Colombia	Silvia Fernanda Ortiz	9.635 (4)	Top 5
47	1988	South Korea	Chang Yoon-jung	9.630 (2)	1st Runner-Up
48	1996	Sweden	Annika Duckmark	9.629 (8)	Top 10
49	1992	India	Madhushri Sapre	9.629 (2)	2nd Runner-Up
50	1994	Switzerland	Patricia Fässler	9.623 (9)	Top 10
51	1994	Greece	Rea Toutounzi	9.618 (10)	Top 10
52	1992	Namibia	Michelle McLean	9.614 (3)	Miss Universe 1992
53	1992	Colombia	Paola Turbay	9.607 (4)	1st Runner-Up
54	1996	India	Sandhya Chib	9.602 (9)	Top 10
55	1997	Trinidad and Tobago	Margot Bourgeois	9.600 (5)	2nd Runner-Up
56	1991	Netherlands	Paulien Huizinga	9.600 (4)	1st Runner-Up
57	2007	Brazil	Natália Guimarães	9.599 (1)	1st Runner-Up
58	1995	Colombia	Tatiana Castro	9.599 (8)	Top 10
59	1991	France	Maréva Georges	9.590 (5)	Top 10
60	1998	South Africa	Kerishnie Naiker	9.587 (5)	Top 10
61	2013	Ecuador	Constanza Báez	9.583 (2)	2nd Runner-Up
62	1993	India	Namrata Shirodkar	9.582 (3)	Top 6
63	1996	Russia	Ilmira Shamsutdinova	9.573 (10)	Top 6
64	1995	Dominican Republic	Cándida Lara	9.573 (9)	Top 10
65	2000	Venezuela	Claudia Moreno	9.556 (1)	1st Runner-Up
66	1991	Curaçao	Jacqueline Krijger	9.550 (6)	Top 10
67	1986	Venezuela	Bárbara Palacios	9.550 (1)	Miss Universe 1986
68	2013	Spain	Patricia Rodríguez	9.545 (3)	1st Runner-Up
69	1991	United States	Kelli McCarty	9.542 (7)	Top 6
70	1991	Jamaica	Kimberley Mais	9.542 (7)	Top 6
71	1984	Sweden	Yvonne Ryding	9.540 (1)	Miss Universe 1984
72	1995	El Salvador	Eleonora Carrillo	9.531 (10)	Top 10
73	1993	Venezuela	Milka Chulina	9.526 (4)	2nd Runner-Up
74	2001	Venezuela	Eva Ekvall	9.525 (3)	3rd Runner-Up
75	2007	Venezuela	Ly Jonaitis	9.510 (2)	2nd Runner-Up
76	2000	Spain	Helen Lindes	9.510 (2)	2nd Runner-Up
77	1993	Puerto Rico	Dayanara Torres	9.507 (5)	Miss Universe 1993
78	1998	United States	Shawnae Jebbia	9.505 (6)	Top 5
79	1993	Brazil	Leila Schuster	9.496 (6)	Top 10
80	1986	United States	Christy Fichtner	9.490 (2)	1st Runner-Up
81	1987	United States	Michelle Royer	9.480 (3)	2nd Runner-Up
82	1997	Puerto Rico	Ana Rosa Brito	9.471 (6)	Top 10
83	1983	United States	Julie Hayek	9.455 (1)	1st Runner-Up
84	1998	Russia	Anna Malova	9.453 (7)	Top 10
85	2001	United States	Kandace Krueger	9.450 (4)	2nd Runner-Up
86	1999	Spain	Diana Nogueira	9.450 (1)	2nd Runner-Up
87	1998	India	Lymaraina D'Souza	9.443 (8)	Top 10
88	1997	Panama	Lía Victoria Borrero	9.443 (7)	Top 6
89	1991	Yugoslavia	Nataša Pavlović	9.442 (9)	Top 10
90	2008	Mexico	Elisa Nájera	9.429 (3)	4th Runner-Up
91	2009	Dominican Republic	Ada Aimée de la Cruz	9.428 (1)	1st Runner-Up
92	1999	Philippines	Miriam Quiambao	9.428 (2)	1st Runner-Up
93	1998	Brazil	Michella Marchi	9.428 (9)	Top 10
94	1992	Netherlands	Vivian Jansen	9.421 (5)	Top 6
95	2001	Spain	Eva Sisó	9.417 (5)	Top 10
96	1997	Estonia	Kristiina Heinmets	9.417 (8)	Top 10
97	1979	Venezuela	Maritza Sayalero	9.416 (1)	Miss Universe 1979
98	2000	India	Lara Dutta	9.400 (3)	Miss Universe 2000
99	1999	Venezuela	Carolina Indriago	9.388 (3)	Top 5
100	1989	Sweden	Louise Drevenstam	9.376 (2)	1st Runner-Up
101	1993	United States	Kenya Summer Moore	9.367 (7)	Top 6
102	1999	Botswana	Mpule Kwelagobe	9.366 (4)	Miss Universe 1999
103	1992	Belgium	Anke Van dermeersch	9.361 (6)	Top 6
104	1983	New Zealand	Lorraine Downes	9.358 (2)	Miss Universe 1983
105	2001	India	Neha Dhupia	9.350 (6)	4th Runner-Up
106	1991	Paraguay	Vivian Benítez	9.350 (10)	Top 10
107	1986	Colombia	María Mónica Urbina	9.340 (3)	2nd Runner-Up
108	1983	Switzerland	Lolita Morena	9.338 (3)	3rd Runner-Up
109	1983	Venezuela	Paola Ruggeri	9.338 (3)	Top 12
110	2001	Nigeria	Agbani Darego	9.333 (7)	Top 10
111	1998	Ireland	Andrea Roche	9.327 (10)	Top 10
112	1992	Australia	Georgina Denahy	9.327 (7)	Top 10
113	1983	Germany	Loana Radecki	9.322 (5)	Top 12
114	2013	Ukraine	Olga Storozhenko	9.308 (4)	Top 10
115	1984	Venezuela	Carmen María Montiel	9.285 (2)	2nd Runner-Up
116	1997	Sweden	Victoria Lagerström	9.271 (9)	Top 10
117	2001	Israel	Ilanit Levy	9.267 (8)	Top 10
118	1984	Philippines	Desiree Verdadero	9.255 (3)	3rd Runner-Up
119	2013	United Kingdom	Amy Willerton	9.250 (5)	Top 10
120	2009	Kosovo	Gona Dragusha	9.250 (2)	2nd Runner-Up
121	2000	Colombia	Catalina Acosta	9.250 (4)	Top 10
122	1992	United States	Shannon Marketic	9.250 (8)	Top 10
123	2000	United States	Lynnette Cole	9.240 (5)	Top 5
124	1999	Mexico	Silvia Salgado	9.238 (5)	Top 10
125	1988	Mexico	Amanda Olivares	9.233 (3)	2nd Runner-Up
126	2013	Brazil	Jakelyne Oliveira	9.227 (6)	4th Runner-Up
127	1984	Colombia	Susana Caldas	9.220 (4)	4th Runner-Up
128	1983	Ireland	Roberta Brown	9.192 (6)	2nd Runner-Up
129	2007	South Korea	Honey Lee	9.183 (3)	3rd Runner-Up
130	2013	United States	Erin Brady	9.182 (7)	Top 10
131	1984	Netherlands	Nancy Neede	9.175 (5)	Top 10
132	1983	England	Karen Moore	9.172 (7)	4th Runner-Up
133	1993	Czech Republic	Pavlina Barbukova	9.171 (8)	Top 10
134	1993	Spain	Eugenia Santana	9.167 (9)	Top 10
135	1983	Singapore	Kathie Lee	9.161 (8)	Top 12
136	1999	India	Gul Panag	9.160 (6)	Top 10
137	1986	Brazil	Deise Nunes de Souza	9.160 (4)	Top 10
138	2002	China	Zhuo Ling	9.150 (2)	2nd Runner-Up
139	1983	Finland	Nina Rekola	9.144 (9)	Top 12
140	2001	Russia	Oksana Kalandyrets	9.142 (9)	Top 10
141	1999	South Africa	Sonia Raciti	9.133 (7)	Top 5
142	1997	India	Nafisa Joseph	9.129 (10)	Top 10
143	1986	Finland	Tuula Polvi	9.120 (5)	4th Runner-Up
144	1979	Bermuda	Gina Swainson	9.100 (2)	1st Runner-Up
145	1989	Venezuela	Lisa Ljung	9.096 (3)	Top 10
146	1993	Finland	Tarja Smura	9.091 (10)	Top 10
147	1999	Puerto Rico	Brenda Liz Lopez	9.086 (8)	Top 10
148	2013	Dominican Republic	Yaritza Reyes	9.082 (8)	Top 10
149	1988	Hong Kong	Pauline Yeung	9.074 (4)	4th Runner-Up
150	1985	Puerto Rico	Deborah Carthy-Deu	9.057 (1)	Miss Universe 1985
151	2009	Puerto Rico	Mayra Matos Pérez	9.050 (3)	4th Runner-Up
152	1992	New Zealand	Lisa Maree de Montalk	9.043 (9)	Top 10
153	2000	Estonia	Evelyn Mikomägi	9.040 (6)	Top 10
154	2009	Australia	Rachael Finch	9.039 (4)	3rd Runner-Up
155	2008	Dominican Republic	Marianne Cruz González	9.036 (4)	2nd Runner-Up
156	1989	Poland	Joanna Gapinzka	9.027 (4)	3rd Runner-Up
157	1984	Germany	Brigitte Berx	9.027 (6)	Top 10
158	1989	Mexico	Adriana Abascal	9.026 (5)	4th Runner-Up
159	1984	South Africa	Leticia Snyman	9.025 (7)	1st Runner-Up
160	1983	Italy	Federica Moro	9.016 (10)	Top 12
161	1989	Germany	Andrea Stelzer	9.010 (6)	Top 10
162	1986	Poland	Brygida Bziukiewicz	9.000 (6)	3rd Runner-Up
163	1985	Venezuela	Silvia Martínez	9.000 (2)	3rd Runner-Up
164	2001	France	Élodie Gossuin	8.992 (10)	Top 10
165	1990	Norway	Mona Grudt	8.989 (1)	Miss Universe 1990
166	1985	Democratic Republic of the Congo	Benita Mureka Tete	8.983 (3)	2nd Runner-Up
167	1984	Thailand	Savinee Pakaranang	8.975 (8)	Top 10
168	1992	Sweden	Monica Brodd	8.971 (10)	Top 10
169	2000	Canada	Kim Yee	8.970 (7)	Top 5
170	1988	Japan	Mizuho Sakaguchi	8.944 (5)	3rd Runner-Up
171	2007	Japan	Riyo Mori	8.943 (4)	Miss Universe 2007
172	1988	United States	Courtney Gibbs	8.943 (6)	Top 10
173	2000	Zimbabwe	Corinne Crewe	8.940 (8)	Top 10
174	1979	England	Carolyn Seaward	8.936 (3)	2nd Runner-Up
175	2013	Philippines	Ariella Arida	8.933 (9)	3rd Runner-Up
176	1989	Jamaica	Sandra Foster	8.933 (7)	Top 10
177	1989	United States	Gretchen Polhemus	8.927 (8)	2nd Runner-Up
178	2002	Panama	Justine Pasek	8.920 (3)	Miss Universe 2002 (succeeded)
179	2000	France	Sonia Rolland	8.920 (9)	Top 10
180	1986	Democratic Republic of the Congo	Aimée Dobala	8.920 (7)	Top 10
181	1987	Philippines	Geraldine Asis	8.915 (4)	Top 10
182	2010	Mexico	Ximena Navarrete	8.913 (1)	Miss Universe 2010
183	1987	Venezuela	Inés María Calero	8.890 (5)	3rd Runner-Up
184	1981	Venezuela	Irene Sáez	8.887 (1)	Miss Universe 1981
185	2010	Jamaica	Yendi Phillips	8.884 (2)	1st Runner-Up
186	1980	United States	Shawn Weatherly	8.883 (1)	Miss Universe 1980
187	1986	Switzerland	Eveline Glanzmann	8.870 (8)	Top 10
188	2009	Venezuela	Stefanía Fernández	8.869 (5)	Miss Universe 2009
189	1984	United States	Mai Shanley	8.855 (9)	Top 10
190	2010	Australia	Jesinta Campbell	8.841 (3)	2nd Runner-Up
191	2002	Germany	Natascha Börger	8.840 (4)	Top 10
192	1990	Colombia	Lizeth Mahecha	8.840 (2)	2nd Runner-Up
193	2002	Venezuela	Cynthia Lander	8.830 (5)	4th Runner-Up
194	1983	Norway	Karen Dobloug	8.822 (11)	Top 12
195	1979	Brazil	Martha Jussara da Costa	8.818 (4)	3rd Runner-Up
196	1988	Venezuela	Yajaira Vera	8.811 (7)	Top 10
197	1984	Guatemala	Ilma Urrutia	8.805 (10)	Top 10
198	2002	South Africa	Vanessa Carreira	8.790 (6)	3rd Runner-Up
199	1983	Spain	Ana Herrero	8.788 (12)	Top 12
200	1987	Puerto Rico	Laurie Simpson	8.783 (6)	4th Runner-Up
201	1986	Chile	Mariana Villasante	8.780 (9)	Top 10
202	1990	Chile	Uranía Haltenhoff	8.770 (3)	Top 6
203	1989	Chile	Macarena Mina	8.755 (9)	Top 10
204	1989	Finland	Åsa Lövdahl	8.755 (9)	Top 10
205	2007	United States	Rachel Smith	8.754 (5)	4th Runner-Up
206	1999	Jamaica	Nicole Haughton	8.754 (9)	Top 10
207	2000	South Africa	Heather Hamilton	8.750 (10)	Top 10
208	1988	Dominican Republic	Patricia Jiménez	8.744 (8)	Top 10
209	2010	Ukraine	Anna Poslavska	8.743 (4)	3rd Runner-Up
210	1985	Uruguay	Andrea López	8.730 (4)	4th Runner-Up
211	2010	Philippines	Venus Raj	8.714 (5)	4th Runner-Up
212	1990	Mexico	Marilé del Rosario	8.707 (4)	Top 6
213	1982	South Africa	Odette Scrooby	8.707 (1)	Top 12
214	2010	Albania	Angela Martini	8.693 (6)	Top 10
215	1999	Ghana	Akuba Cudjoe	8.683 (10)	Top 10
216	1985	Ireland	Olivia Tracey	8.668 (5)	Top 10
217	1986	Puerto Rico	Elizabeth Robison	8.660 (10)	Top 10
218	1985	Spain	Teresa Sánchez López	8.660 (6)	1st Runner-Up
219	2009	France	Chloé Mortaud	8.650 (6)	Top 10
220	1988	Colombia	Diana Arévalo	8.644 (9)	Top 10
221	1987	Turks and Caicos Islands	Carmelita Ariza	8.634 (7)	Top 10
222	1990	United States	Carole Gist	8.630 (5)	1st Runner-Up
223	1982	Italy	Cinzia Fiordeponti	8.608 (2)	2nd Runner-Up
224	1990	Bolivia	Rosario Rico Toro	8.600 (6)	Top 6
225	1990	Venezuela	Andreína Goetz	8.590 (7)	Top 10
226	1990	India	Suzanne Sablok	8.552 (8)	Top 10
227	2010	Ireland	Rozanna Purcell	8.548 (7)	Top 10
228	1982	Canada	Karen Baldwin	8.525 (3)	Miss Universe 1982
229	2002	Albania	Anisa Kospiri	8.510 (7)	Top 10
230	1981	Canada	Dominique Dufour	8.508 (2)	1st Runner-Up
231	2002	Cyprus	Demetra Eleftheriou	8.490 (8)	Top 10
232	2007	Tanzania	Flaviana Matata	8.488 (6)	Top 10
233	2008	Russia	Vera Krasova	8.471 (5)	3rd Runner-Up
234	1979	South Africa	Veronika Wilson	8.454 (5)	Top 12
235	2013	India	Manasi Moghe	8.433 (10)	Top 10
236	1980	Philippines	Maria Rosario Silayan	8.433 (2)	3rd Runner-Up
237	2010	South Africa	Nicole Flint	8.420 (8)	Top 10
238	1979	Sweden	Annette Ekström	8.409 (6)	4th Runner-Up
239	1980	New Zealand	Delyse Nottle	8.400 (3)	2nd Runner-Up
240	2002	Canada	Neelam Verma	8.390 (9)	Top 10
241	2007	Angola	Micaela Reis	8.363 (7)	Top 10
242	1982	Guam	Patty Chong Kerkos	8.355 (4)	1st Runner-Up
243	1980	Sweden	Eva Brigitta Andersson	8.346 (4)	4th Runner-Up
244	1979	United States	Mary Therese Friel	8.335 (7)	Top 12
245	1987	Singapore	Marion Nicole Teo	8.333 (8)	Top 10
246	1982	Greece	Tina Roussou	8.317 (5)	3rd Runner-Up
247	1987	Sweden	Suzanne Thörngren	8.300 (9)	Top 10
248	1982	Peru	Francesca Zaza	8.292 (6)	Top 12
249	2010	Guatemala	Jessica Scheel	8.286 (9)	Top 10
250	1987	Peru	Jessica Newton	8.268 (10)	Top 10
251	1981	Belgium	Dominike van Eeckhoudt	8.268 (3)	4th Runner-Up
252	1980	Scotland	Linda Gallagher	8.267 (5)	1st Runner-Up
253	2008	Kosovo	Zana Krasniqi	8.264 (6)	Top 10
254	1985	Chile	Claudia van Sint	8.232 (7)	Top 10
255	1979	Scotland	Lorraine Davidson	8.218 (8)	Top 12
256	2008	Spain	Claudia Moro	8.200 (7)	Top 10
257	1990	Turkey	Jülide Ateş	8.200 (9)	Top 10
258	1981	Sweden	Eva-Lena Lundgren	8.179 (4)	2nd Runner-Up
259	1982	England	Della Dolan	8.167 (7)	Top 12
260	1985	United States	Laura Harring	8.164 (8)	Top 10
261	1979	Wales	Janet Beverly Hobson	8.150 (9)	Top 12
262	1979	Germany	Andrea Hontschik	8.118 (10)	Top 12
263	1979	Belize	Sarita Acosta	8.118 (10)	Top 12
264	2002	India	Neha Dhupia	8.100 (10)	Top 10
265	1980	Canada	Teresa MacKay	8.100 (6)	Top 12
266	1988	Norway	Bente Brunland	8.077 (10)	Top 10
267	1980	Tahiti	Thilda Fuller	8.067 (7)	Top 12
268	2008	United States	Crystle Stewart	8.050 (8)	Top 10
269	1985	Brazil	Márcia de Oliveira	8.042 (9)	Top 10
270	2009	South Africa	Tatum Keshwar	8.040 (7)	Top 10
271	1985	Canada	Karen Tilley	8.021 (10)	Top 10
272	1979	Argentina	Virginia Álvarez	8.021 (12)	Top 12
273	2009	Czech Republic	Iveta Lutovská	8.010 (8)	Top 10
274	2010	Puerto Rico	Mariana Vicente	7.971 (10)	Top 10
275	1990	Czechoslovakia	Jana Hronkova	7.970 (10)	Top 10
276	1980	South Korea	Kim Eun-jung	7.967 (8)	Top 12
277	1981	Tahiti	Tatiana Teraiamano	7.962 (5)	Top 12
278	1980	Iceland	Guðbjörg Sigurdardóttir	7.933 (9)	Top 12
279	1982	United States	Terri Utley	7.925 (8)	4th Runner-Up
280	1982	Brazil	Celice Marques	7.917 (9)	Top 12
281	1982	Finland	Sari Aspholm	7.908 (10)	Top 12
282	2009	Switzerland	Whitney Toyloy	7.890 (9)	Top 10
283	1980	Puerto Rico	Agnes Tañón	7.867 (10)	Top 12
284	2007	Mexico	Rosa María Ojeda	7.850 (8)	Top 10
285	1980	Colombia	María Patricia Arbeláez	7.842 (11)	Top 12
286	1981	Norway	Mona Olsen	7.838 (6)	Top 12
287	2007	India	Puja Gupta	7.825 (9)	Top 10
288	1980	Panama	Gloria Karamañites	7.825 (12)	Top 12
289	1981	Brazil	Adriana Alves de Oliveira	7.824 (7)	3rd Runner-Up
290	1982	Uruguay	Silvia Vila	7.783 (11)	Top 12
291	2008	Italy	Claudia Ferraris	7.729 (9)	Top 10
292	2007	Nicaragua	Xiomara Blandino	7.674 (10)	Top 10
293	1981	United States	Kim Seelbrede	7.653 (8)	Top 12
294	1981	Netherlands	Ingrid Schouten	7.625 (9)	Top 12
295	2008	Australia	Laura Dundovic	7.557 (10)	Top 10
296	2009	United States	Kristen Dalton	7.550 (10)	Top 10
297	1978	Spain	Guillermina Ruiz	7.545 (1)	2nd Runner-Up
298	1982	Germany	Kerstin Paeserack	7.483 (12)	Top 12
299	1978	United States	Judi Andersen	7.482 (2)	1st Runner-Up
300	1981	Germany	Marion Kurz	7.442 (10)	Top 12
301	1978	Sweden	Cécilia Rodhe	7.355 (3)	4th Runner-Up
302	1981	New Zealand	Donella Thomsen	7.350 (11)	Top 12
303	1981	Ecuador	Lucía Vinueza	7.317 (12)	Top 12
304	1978	Colombia	Shirley Sáenz	6.545 (4)	3rd Runner-Up
305	1978	South Africa	Margaret Gardiner	6.373 (5)	Miss Universe 1978
306	1978	Belgium	Françoise Moens	5.709 (6)	Top 12
307	1978	Israel	Dorit Jellinek	4.945 (7)	Top 12
308	1978	Ireland	Lorraine Enriquez	4.756 (8)	Top 12
309	1978	Chile	Marianne Müller	4.536 (9)	Top 12
310	1978	Mexico	Alba Cervera	4.145 (10)	Top 12
311	1978	Netherlands	Karen Gustafsson	3.573 (11)	Top 12
312	1978	Peru	Olga Zumarán	3.573 (11)	Top 12

== Interview ==
The following is a list of the scores obtained during the interview competition (1978–1999) in Miss Universeː

Color key

- Declared as winner
- Ended as runner-up
- Ended as top 5/6 qualification
- Ended as one of the finalists or semifinalists

#	Year	Country/Territory	Contestant	Score	Placement
1	1993	Venezuela	Milka Chulina	9.843 (1)	2nd Runner-Up
2	1996	Venezuela	Alicia Machado	9.809 (1)	Miss Universe 1996
3	1996	United States	Ali Landry	9.793 (2)	Top 6
4	1988	Thailand	Porntip Nakhirunkanok	9.730 (1)	Miss Universe 1988
5	1998	Trinidad and Tobago	Wendy Fitzwilliam	9.717 (1)	Miss Universe 1998
6	1995	El Salvador	Eleonora Carrillo	9.674 (1)	Top 10
7	1994	Slovakia	Silvia Lakatošová	9.668 (1)	Top 6
8	1994	Colombia	Carolina Gómez	9.655 (2)	1st Runner-Up
9	1995	Puerto Rico	Desiree Lowry	9.653 (2)	Top 6
10	1996	Russia	Ilmira Shamsutdinova	9.646 (3)	Top 6
11	1992	Colombia	Paola Turbay	9.643 (1)	1st Runner-Up
12	1995	United States	Chelsi Smith	9.639 (3)	Miss Universe 1995
13	1996	El Salvador	Milena Mayorga	9.636 (4)	Top 10
14	1996	Aruba	Taryn Mansell	9.629 (5)	1st Runner-Up
15	1997	United States	Brook Lee	9.614 (1)	Miss Universe 1997
16	1991	Mexico	Lupita Jones	9.608 (1)	Miss Universe 1991
17	1994	Venezuela	Minorka Mercado	9.592 (3)	2nd Runner-Up
18	1991	Netherlands	Paulien Huizinga	9.592 (2)	1st Runner-Up
19	1994	Philippines	Charlene Gonzales	9.587 (4)	Top 6
20	1992	Venezuela	Carolina Izsak	9.586 (2)	Top 6
21	1989	Netherlands	Angela Visser	9.583 (1)	Miss Universe 1989
22	1996	India	Sandhya Chib	9.580 (6)	Top 10
23	1995	India	Manpreet Brar	9.573 (4)	1st Runner-Up
24	1994	India	Sushmita Sen	9.562 (5)	Miss Universe 1994
25	1996	Mexico	Vanessa Guzmán	9.560 (7)	Top 6
26	1996	Finland	Lola Odusoga	9.551 (8)	2nd Runner-Up
27	1991	Soviet Union	Julia Lemigova	9.550 (3)	2nd Runner-Up
28	1996	Peru	Natali Sacco	9.549 (9)	Top 10
29	1997	Italy	Denny Méndez	9.543 (2)	Top 6
30	1987	Chile	Cecilia Bolocco	9.539 (1)	Miss Universe 1987
31	1995	Canada	Lana Buchberger	9.538 (5)	2nd Runner-Up
32	1991	Venezuela	Jackeline Rodríguez	9.533 (4)	Top 6
33	1992	Namibia	Michelle McLean	9.529 (3)	Miss Universe 1992
34	1992	Belgium	Anke van Dermeersch	9.526 (4)	Top 6
35	1995	South Africa	Augustine Masilela	9.525 (6)	Top 10
36	1993	Colombia	Paula Andrea Betancourt	9.508 (2)	1st Runner-Up
37	1992	India	Madhushri Sapre	9.508 (5)	2nd Runner-Up
38	1995	Trinidad and Tobago	Arlene Peterkin	9.499 (7)	Top 6
39	1995	Venezuela	Denyse Floreano	9.499 (7)	Top 6
40	1996	Sweden	Annika Duckmark	9.493 (10)	Top 10
41	1998	India	Lymaraina D'Souza	9.492 (2)	Top 10
42	1994	United States	Lu Parker	9.478 (6)	Top 6
43	1988	South Korea	Chang Yoon-jung	9.453 (2)	1st Runner-Up
44	1997	Curaçao	Verna Vasquez	9.443 (3)	Top 6
45	1993	India	Namrata Shirodkar	9.429 (3)	Top 6
46	1991	United States	Kelli McCarty	9.425 (5)	Top 6
47	1998	Venezuela	Veruska Ramírez	9.423 (3)	1st Runner-Up
48	1994	Sweden	Domenique Forsberg	9.423 (7)	Top 10
49	1991	Jamaica	Kimberley Mais	9.418 (6)	Top 6
50	1993	Finland	Tarja Smura	9.407 (4)	Top 10
51	1986	Venezuela	Bárbara Palacios	9.390 (1)	Miss Universe 1986
52	1997	Panama	Lía Victoria Borrero	9.386 (4)	Top 6
53	1994	Italy	Arianna David	9.378 (8)	Top 10
54	1991	Paraguay	Vivian Benítez	9.375 (7)	Top 10
55	1993	United States	Kenya Summer Moore	9.367 (5)	Top 6
56	1979	Venezuela	Maritza Sayalero	9.362 (1)	Miss Universe 1979
57	1992	United States	Shannon Marketic	9.350 (6)	Top 10
58	1992	New Zealand	Lisa Maree de Montalk	9.350 (6)	Top 10
59	1997	Trinidad and Tobago	Margot Bourgeois	9.343 (5)	2nd Runner-Up
60	1993	Puerto Rico	Dayanara Torres	9.314 (6)	Miss Universe 1993
61	1994	Switzerland	Patricia Fässler	9.298 (9)	Top 10
62	1993	Brazil	Leila Schuster	9.297 (7)	Top 10
63	1999	India	Gul Panag	9.275 (1)	Top 10
64	1998	Brazil	Michella Marchi	9.275 (4)	Top 10
65	1997	Puerto Rico	Ana Rosa Brito	9.271 (6)	Top 10
66	1998	United States	Shawnae Jebbia	9.267 (5)	Top 5
67	1993	Australia	Voni Delfos	9.267 (8)	Top 6
68	1988	Mexico	Amanda Olivares	9.266 (3)	2nd Runner-Up
69	1989	Sweden	Louise Drevenstam	9.261 (2)	1st Runner-Up
70	1999	South Africa	Sonia Raciti	9.249 (2)	Top 5
71	1983	Ireland	Roberta Brown	9.244 (1)	2nd Runner-Up
72	1992	Australia	Georgina Denahy	9.242 (8)	Top 10
73	1999	Venezuela	Carolina Indriago	9.230 (3)	Top 5
74	1998	Puerto Rico	Joyce Giraud	9.230 (6)	2nd Runner-Up
75	1997	Sweden	Victoria Lagerström	9.229 (7)	Top 10
76	1992	Netherlands	Vivian Jansen	9.229 (9)	Top 6
77	1995	Dominican Republic	Cándida Lara	9.219 (9)	Top 10
78	1984	Colombia	Susana Caldas	9.200 (1)	4th Runner-Up
79	1987	United States	Michelle Royer	9.195 (2)	2nd Runner-Up
80	1991	Curaçao	Jacqueline Krijger	9.190 (8)	Top 10
81	1991	Yugoslavia	Natasha Pavlovich	9.167 (9)	Top 10
82	1997	India	Nafisa Joseph	9.157 (8)	Top 10
83	1993	Czech Republic	Pavlina Barbukova	9.154 (9)	Top 10
84	1997	Estonia	Kristiina Heinmets	9.143 (9)	Top 10
85	1984	Venezuela	Carmen María Montiel	9.140 (2)	2nd Runner-Up
86	1983	Switzerland	Lolita Morena	9.138 (2)	3rd Runner-Up
87	1998	Colombia	Silvia Fernanda Ortiz	9.115 (7)	Top 5
88	1984	South Africa	Leticia Snyman	9.100 (3)	1st Runner-Up
89	1984	Sweden	Yvonne Ryding	9.090 (4)	Miss Universe 1984
90	1999	Puerto Rico	Brenda Liz Lopez	9.087 (4)	Top 10
91	1983	New Zealand	Lorraine Downes	9.081 (3)	Miss Universe 1983
92	1991	France	Maréva Georges	9.067 (10)	Top 10
93	1997	Venezuela	Marena Bencomo	9.060 (10)	1st Runner-Up
94	1999	Botswana	Mpule Kwelagobe	9.052 (5)	Miss Universe 1999
95	1984	Philippines	Desiree Verdadero	9.050 (5)	3rd Runner-Up
96	1986	Poland	Brygida Bziukiewicz	9.030 (2)	3rd Runner-Up
97	1994	Greece	Rea Toutounzi	9.027 (10)	Top 10
98	1983	England	Karen Moore	9.027 (4)	4th Runner-Up
99	1998	South Africa	Kerishnie Naiker	9.025 (8)	Top 10
100	1995	Colombia	Tatiana Castro	9.020 (10)	Top 10
101	1999	Jamaica	Nicold Haughton	9.000 (6)	Top 10
102	1998	Ireland	Andrea Roche	8.975 (9)	Top 10
103	1981	Venezuela	Irene Sáez	8.966 (1)	Miss Universe 1981
104	1988	Japan	Mizuho Sakaguchi	8.922 (4)	3rd Runner-Up
105	1983	United States	Julie Hayek	8.916 (5)	1st Runner-Up
106	1993	Spain	Eugenia Santana	8.914 (10)	Top 10
107	1999	Spain	Diana Nogueira	8.904 (7)	2nd Runner-Up
108	1987	Italy	Roberta Capua	8.890 (3)	1st Runner-Up
109	1986	United States	Christy Fichtner	8.880 (3)	1st Runner-Up
110	1983	Germany	Loana Radecki	8.872 (6)	Top 12
111	1979	Bermuda	Gina Swainson	8.872 (2)	1st Runner-Up
112	1982	Guam	Patty Chong Kerkos	8.867 (1)	1st Runner-Up
113	1999	Ghana	Akuba Cudjoe	8.850 (8)	Top 10
114	1986	Colombia	María Mónica Urbina	8.850 (4)	2nd Runner-Up
115	1988	Dominican Republic	Patricia Jiménez	8.833 (5)	Top 10
116	1985	Spain	Teresa Sánchez López	8.793 (1)	1st Runner-Up
117	1999	Philippines	Miriam Quiambao	8.787 (9)	1st Runner-Up
118	1992	Sweden	Monica Brodd	8.786 (10)	Top 10
119	1990	Norway	Mona Grudt	8.760 (1)	Miss Universe 1990
120	1988	Hong Kong	Pauline Yeung	8.744 (6)	4th Runner-Up
121	1988	Colombia	Diana Arévalo	8.712 (7)	Top 10
122	1985	Venezuela	Silvia Martínez	8.693 (2)	3rd Runner-Up
123	1979	England	Carolyn Seaward	8.671 (3)	2nd Runner-Up
124	1983	Venezuela	Paola Ruggeri	8.666 (7)	Top 12
125	1983	Singapore	Kathie Lee	8.658 (8)	Top 12
126	1981	Sweden	Eva-Lena Lundgren	8.658 (2)	2nd Runner-Up
127	1989	Mexico	Adriana Abascal	8.650 (3)	4th Runner-Up
128	1985	Democratic Republic of the Congo	Benita Mureka Tete	8.648 (3)	2nd Runner-Up
129	1983	Italy	Federica Moro	8.644 (9)	Top 12
130	1987	Puerto Rico	Laurie Simpson	8.630 (4)	4th Runner-Up
131	1999	Mexico	Silvia Salgado	8.616 (10)	Top 10
132	1990	Colombia	Lizeth Mahecha	8.610 (2)	2nd Runner-Up
133	1984	Thailand	Savinee Pakaranang	8.610 (6)	Top 10
134	1984	Guatemala	Ilma Urrutia	8.590 (7)	Top 10
135	1982	South Africa	Odette Scrooby	8.583 (2)	Top 12
136	1998	Russia	Anna Malova	8.568 (10)	Top 10
137	1985	Uruguay	Andrea López	8.560 (4)	4th Runner-Up
138	1984	Netherlands	Nancy Neede	8.555 (8)	Top 10
139	1988	Venezuela	Yajaira Vera	8.543 (8)	Top 10
140	1989	Finland	Åsa Lövdahl	8.533 (4)	Top 10
141	1981	Belgium	Dominike van Eeckhoudt	8.529 (3)	4th Runner-Up
142	1988	United States	Courtney Gibbs	8.522 (9)	Top 10
143	1989	United States	Gretchen Polhemus	8.511 (5)	2nd Runner-Up
144	1990	United States	Carole Gist	8.509 (3)	1st Runner-Up
145	1979	Brazil	Martha Jussara da Costa	8.509 (4)	3rd Runner-Up
146	1990	Mexico	Marilé del Rosario	8.500 (4)	Top 6
147	1983	Norway	Karen Dobloug	8.486 (10)	Top 12
148	1989	Poland	Joanna Gapinzka	8.472 (6)	3rd Runner-Up
149	1986	Finland	Tuula Polvi	8.470 (5)	4th Runner-Up
150	1989	Germany	Andrea Stelzer	8.461 (7)	Top 10
151	1990	Bolivia	Rosario Rico Toro	8.439 (5)	Top 6
152	1981	Norway	Mona Olsen	8.435 (4)	Top 12
153	1982	England	Della Dolan	8.433 (3)	Top 12
154	1983	Finland	Nina Rekola	8.427 (11)	Top 12
155	1982	United States	Terri Utley	8.425 (4)	4th Runner-Up
156	1990	Chile	Uranía Haltenhoff	8.411 (6)	Top 6
157	1982	Canada	Karen Baldwin	8.400 (5)	Miss Universe 1982
158	1987	Venezuela	Inés María Calero	8.375 (5)	3rd Runner-Up
159	1990	Venezuela	Andreína Goetz	8.370 (7)	Top 10
160	1986	Democratic Republic of the Congo	Aimée Dobala	8.366 (6)	Top 10
161	1985	Puerto Rico	Deborah Carthy-Deu	8.365 (5)	Miss Universe 1985
162	1990	Czechoslovakia	Jana Hronkova	8.360 (8)	Top 10
163	1980	United States	Shawn Weatherly	8.317 (1)	Miss Universe 1980
164	1979	Sweden	Annette Ekström	8.300 (5)	4th Runner-Up
165	1980	New Zealand	Delyse Nottle	8.283 (2)	2nd Runner-Up
166	1985	Canada	Karen Tilley	8.261 (6)	Top 10
167	1983	Spain	Ana Herrero	8.261 (12)	Top 12
168	1986	Puerto Rico	Elizabeth Robison	8.260 (7)	Top 10
169	1987	Philippines	Geraldine Asis	8.231 (6)	Top 10
170	1986	Chile	Mariana Villasante	8.230 (8)	Top 10
171	1982	Peru	Francesca Zaza	8.218 (6)	Top 12
172	1980	Sweden	Eva Brigitta Andersson	8.208 (3)	4th Runner-Up
173	1989	Venezuela	Lisa Ljung	8.204 (8)	Top 10
174	1990	India	Suzanne Sablok	8.200 (9)	Top 10
175	1984	United States	Mai Shanley	8.195 (9)	Top 10
176	1981	Brazil	Adriana Alves de Oliveira	8.191 (5)	3rd Runner-Up
177	1986	Brazil	Deise Nunes de Souza	8.175 (9)	Top 10
178	1984	Germany	Brigitte Berx	8.175 (10)	Top 10
179	1981	Canada	Dominique Dufour	8.167 (6)	1st Runner-Up
180	1978	United States	Judi Andersen	8.155 (1)	1st Runner-Up
181	1981	Tahiti	Tatiana Teraiamano	8.149 (7)	Top 12
182	1982	Brazil	Celice Marques	8.133 (7)	Top 12
183	1979	Germany	Andrea Hontschik	8.125 (6)	Top 12
184	1980	Philippines	Maria Rosario Silayan	8.121 (4)	3rd Runner-Up
185	1979	Belize	Sarita Acosta	8.118 (7)	Top 12
186	1989	Jamaica	Sandra Foster	8.111 (9)	Top 10
187	1987	Sweden	Suzanne Thörngren	8.105 (7)	Top 10
188	1979	United States	Mary Therese Friel	8.100 (8)	Top 12
189	1990	Turkey	Jülide Ateş	8.079 (10)	Top 10
190	1982	Greece	Tina Roussou	8.042 (8)	3rd Runner-Up
191	1980	Scotland	Linda Gallagher	8.036 (5)	1st Runner-Up
192	1989	Chile	Macarena Mina	8.033 (10)	Top 10
193	1986	Switzerland	Eveline Glanzmann	8.020 (10)	Top 10
194	1987	Turks and Caicos Islands	Carmelita Ariza	8.018 (8)	Top 10
195	1979	Argentina	Virginia Álvarez	8.009 (9)	Top 12
196	1980	Canada	Teresa MacKay	7.992 (6)	Top 12
197	1987	Singapore	Marion Nicole Teo	7.935 (9)	Top 10
198	1982	Italy	Cinzia Fiordeponti	7.925 (9)	2nd Runner-Up
199	1979	South Africa	Veronika Wilson	7.918 (10)	Top 12
200	1981	Germany	Marion Kurz	7.875 (8)	Top 12
201	1987	Peru	Jessica Newton	7.870 (10)	Top 10
202	1980	Puerto Rico	Agnes Tañón	7.850 (7)	Top 12
203	1982	Finland	Sari Aspholm	7.808 (10)	Top 12
204	1980	Colombia	María Patricia Arbeláez	7.789 (8)	Top 12
205	1979	Scotland	Lorraine Davidson	7.764 (11)	Top 12
206	1985	Chile	Claudia van Sint	7.737 (7)	Top 10
207	1980	Panama	Gloria Karamañites	7.713 (9)	Top 12
208	1985	Ireland	Olivia Tracey	7.708 (8)	Top 10
209	1982	Uruguay	Silvia Vila	7.692 (11)	Top 12
210	1980	Iceland	Guðbjörg Sigurdardóttir	7.675 (10)	Top 12
211	1980	South Korea	Kim Eun-jung	7.658 (11)	Top 12
212	1985	United States	Laura Herring	7.650 (9)	Top 10
213	1981	Netherlands	Ingrid Schouten	7.590 (9)	Top 12
214	1988	Norway	Bente Brunland	7.555 (10)	Top 10
215	1978	Sweden	Cécilia Rodhe	7.518 (2)	4th Runner-Up
216	1981	Ecuador	Lucía Vinueza	7.442 (10)	Top 12
217	1981	United States	Kim Seelbrede	7.427 (11)	Top 12
218	1979	Wales	Janet Beverly Hobson	7.380 (12)	Top 12
219	1982	Germany	Kerstin Paeserack	7.204 (12)	Top 12
220	1985	Brazil	Márcia de Oliveira	7.161 (10)	Top 10
221	1980	Tahiti	Thilda Fuller	6.957 (12)	Top 12
222	1981	New Zealand	Donella Thomsen	6.950 (12)	Top 12
223	1978	South Africa	Margaret Gardiner	6.791 (3)	Miss Universe 1978
224	1978	Colombia	Shirley Sáenz	6.645 (4)	3rd Runner-Up
225	1978	Spain	Guillermina Ruiz	6.500 (5)	2nd Runner-Up
226	1978	Belgium	Françoise Moens	6.230 (6)	Top 12
227	1978	Mexico	Alba Cervera	5.320 (7)	Top 12
228	1978	Israel	Dorit Jellinek	5.260 (8)	Top 12
229	1978	Chile	Marianne Müller	5.073 (9)	Top 12
230	1978	Peru	Olga Zumarán	4.422 (10)	Top 12
231	1978	Netherlands	Karen Gustafsson	3.911 (11)	Top 12
232	1978	Ireland	Lorraine Enriquez	3.889 (12)	Top 12

== Final interview ==
The following is a list of the scores obtained during the final interview competition (1992–2000) in Miss Universeː

Color key

- Declared as winner
- Ended as runner-up
- Ended as top 5/6 qualification
- Ended as one of the finalists or semifinalists

#	Year	Country/Territory	Contestant	Score	Placement
1	2000	India	Lara Dutta	9.954 (1)	Miss Universe 2000
2	1997	United States	Brook Lee	9.881 (1)	Miss Universe 1997
3	1996	Venezuela	Alicia Machado	9.846 (1)	Miss Universe 1996
4	1997	Venezuela	Marena Bencomo	9.829 (2)	1st Runner-Up
5	1995	Canada	Lana Buchberger	9.818 (1)	2nd Runner-Up
6	1998	Trinidad and Tobago	Wendy Fitzwilliam	9.792 (1)	Miss Universe 1998
7	1995	United States	Chelsi Smith	9.789 (2)	Miss Universe 1995
8	1996	Aruba	Taryn Mansell	9.779 (2)	1st Runner-Up
9	1992	India	Madhushri Sapre	9.771 (1)	2nd Runner-Up
10	1996	Finland	Lola Odusoga	9.763 (3)	2nd Runner-Up
11	1995	India	Manpreet Brar	9.748 (3)	1st Runner-Up
12	1995	Trinidad and Tobago	Arlene Peterkin	9.724 (4)	Top 6
13	1996	Russia	Ilmira Shamsutdinova	9.714 (4)	Top 6
14	1998	Venezuela	Veruska Ramírez	9.713 (2)	1st Runner-Up
15	1993	Colombia	Paula Andrea Betancourt	9.686 (1)	1st Runner-Up
16	1994	Colombia	Carolina Gómez	9.683 (1)	1st Runner-Up
17	1994	India	Sushmita Sen	9.667 (2)	Miss Universe 1994
18	1994	Venezuela	Minorka Mercado	9.667 (2)	2nd Runner-Up
19	1995	Puerto Rico	Desiree Lowry	9.658 (5)	Top 6
20	1996	Mexico	Vanessa Guzmán	9.657 (5)	Top 6
21	1999	Spain	Diana Nogueira	9.644 (1)	2nd Runner-Up
22	1997	Trinidad and Tobago	Margot Bourgeois	9.643 (3)	2nd Runner-Up
23	1993	Puerto Rico	Dayanara Torres	9.643 (2)	Miss Universe 1993
24	1992	Namibia	Michelle McLean	9.643 (2)	Miss Universe 1992
25	1998	Puerto Rico	Joyce Giraud	9.633 (3)	2nd Runner-Up
26	1993	Venezuela	Milka Chulina	9.633 (3)	2nd Runner-Up
27	1997	Curaçao	Verna Vasquez	9.629 (4)	Top 6
28	1996	United States	Ali Landry	9.604 (6)	Top 6
29	1994	United States	Lu Parker	9.540 (4)	Top 6
30	1992	Colombia	Paola Turbay	9.514 (3)	1st Runner-Up
31	1999	Botswana	Mpule Kwelagobe	9.488 (2)	Miss Universe 1999
32	1992	Venezuela	Carolina Izsak	9.486 (4)	Top 6
33	1994	Slovakia	Silvia Lakatošová	9.467 (5)	Top 6
34	1997	Italy	Denny Mendez	9.450 (5)	Top 6
35	1999	Philippines	Miriam Quiambao	9.446 (3)	1st Runner-Up
36	1994	Philippines	Charlene Gonzales	9.433 (6)	Top 6
37	1995	Venezuela	Denyse Floreano	9.425 (6)	Top 6
38	1992	Netherlands	Vivian Jansen	9.417 (5)	Top 6
39	1993	Australia	Voni Delfos	9.400 (4)	Top 6
40	1998	United States	Shawnae Jebbia	9.382 (4)	Top 5
41	1998	Colombia	Silvia Fernanda Ortiz	9.350 (5)	Top 5
42	1999	Venezuela	Carolina Indriago	9.349 (4)	Top 5
43	1993	United States	Kenya Moore	9.333 (5)	Top 6
44	1992	Belgium	Anke van Dermeersch	9.257 (6)	Top 6
45	1999	South Africa	Sonia Raciti	9.328 (5)	Top 5
46	2000	Spain	Helen Lindes	9.213 (2)	2nd Runner-Up
47	1997	Panama	Lía Victoria Borrero	9.143 (6)	Top 6
48	2000	Venezuela	Claudia Moreno	9.000 (3)	1st Runner-Up
49	2000	Canada	Kim Yee	8.866 (4)	Top 5
50	1993	India	Namrata Shirodkar	8.757 (6)	Top 6
51	2000	United States	Lynnette Cole	8.740 (5)	Top 5

== See also ==
- List of Miss Universe titleholders
- List of Miss Universe runners-up and finalists
