= Christabelle Howie =

Indian model (born 1969)

- Born: Christabelle Nithila Howie; 18 May 1969 (age 57); Chennai, Tamil Nadu, India
- Height: 5 ft 8 in (1.73 m)
- Beauty pageant titleholder
- Hair color: Black
- Eye color: Brown
- Major competitions: Femina Miss India 1991 (Winner); Miss Universe 1991 (Unplaced)

Christabelle Howie (also spelled Christobel Howie, born. 18 May 1969 in Chennai, India) is an Indian model and beauty pageant titleholder who was crowned Femina Miss India Universe 1991 and represented India at Miss Universe 1991.

== Miss Universe 1991 ==
Howie won the title of Miss India in 1991. A few months later, on 17 May 1991 in Las Vegas, Nevada, U.S., she and 72 contestants competed for the title of Miss Universe 1991.

=== Preliminary competition scores at Miss Universe 1991 ===
- Swimsuit Round: 7.60
- Interview Round: 8.60
- Evening Gown Round: 8.11
- Average: 8.103

== Post Miss India Career ==
Howie worked in Media and advertising and settled in UK.

She also acted in student movie by M. Night Shyamalan named Praying with Anger in 1992.

Awards and achievements
Preceded by Suzanne Sablok	Femina Miss India; 1991	Succeeded by Madhu Sapre
