= Miss Universe 1992 =

41st edition of the beauty pageant

- Title card (left) and Miss Universe 1991, Lupita Jones (right), riding on an elephant.
- Date: 9 May 1992 (Note: The event was held at 8:00 am Thailand Time (UTC+07:00); for the Americas, this was 8 May in their local times.)
- Presenters: Dick Clark; Leeza Gibbons; Angela Visser
- Venue: Queen Sirikit National Convention Center, Bangkok, Thailand
- Broadcaster: CBS (international); Channel 7 (official broadcaster)
- Entrants: 78
- Placements: 10
- Debuts: Commonwealth of Independent States; Hungary
- Withdrawals: Belize; Ghana; Hong Kong; Italy; Saint Vincent and the Grenadines; Trinidad and Tobago; Soviet Union; Yugoslavia
- Returns: Aruba; Australia; Austria; Cyprus; Denmark; Egypt; Honduras; Kenya; New Zealand; Portugal; Switzerland
- Winner: Michelle McLean; Namibia

Miss Universe 1992 was the 41st Miss Universe pageant, held at the Queen Sirikit National Convention Center in Bangkok, Thailand, on 9 May 1992.

Michelle McLean of Namibia was crowned by Lupita Jones of Mexico at the conclusion of the event. Seventy-eight contestants competed in the pageant. This is the first and thus far, the only Namibian to have won the pageant.

== Background ==
=== Location and date ===
Thailand anticipated holding the pageant as early as August 1991, when thousands of slum dwellers were evicted to improve the image of the city prior to a World Bank conference that was held in the city in October and the pageant.

The official announcement that Bangkok would host the pageant was made in December 1991, with the date initially set as 16 May. At the same time it secured an exclusive broadcast agreement for Thailand on the subscription television platform Thai Sky TV. In March the date was moved back by a week to 8 May so that it would not clash with Wisakha Bucha Day, a Buddhist holiday.

The pageant was held amidst a political crisis in Thailand that culminated, a week after the pageant, on 17 May in the Black May protests against the government of General Suchinda Kraprayoon. The day prior to the event the public relations director expressed fears that the show might have to be cancelled if the situation escalated, although the threat was played down by other pageant officials.

== Results ==
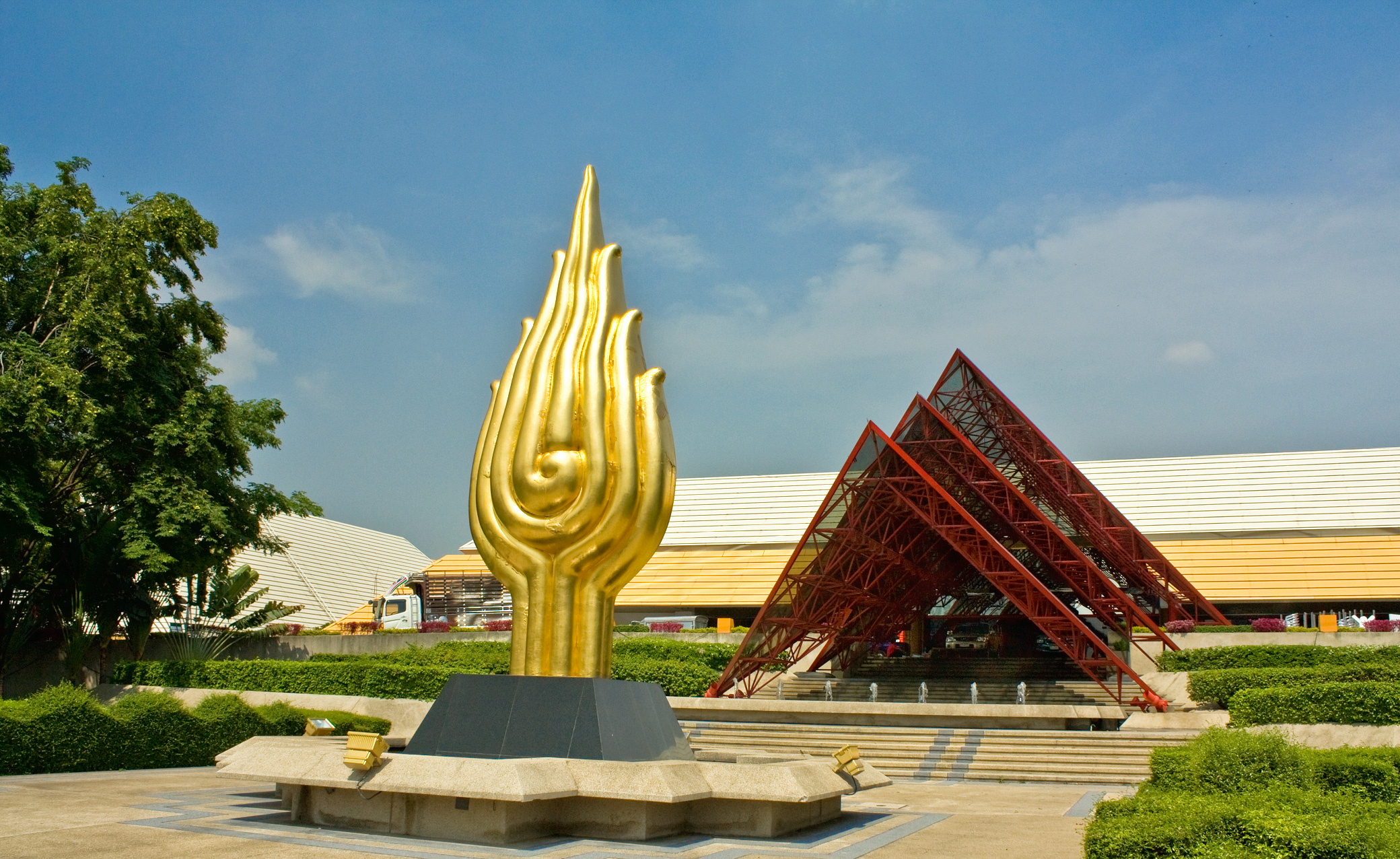
Queen Sirikit Convention Center in Bangkok

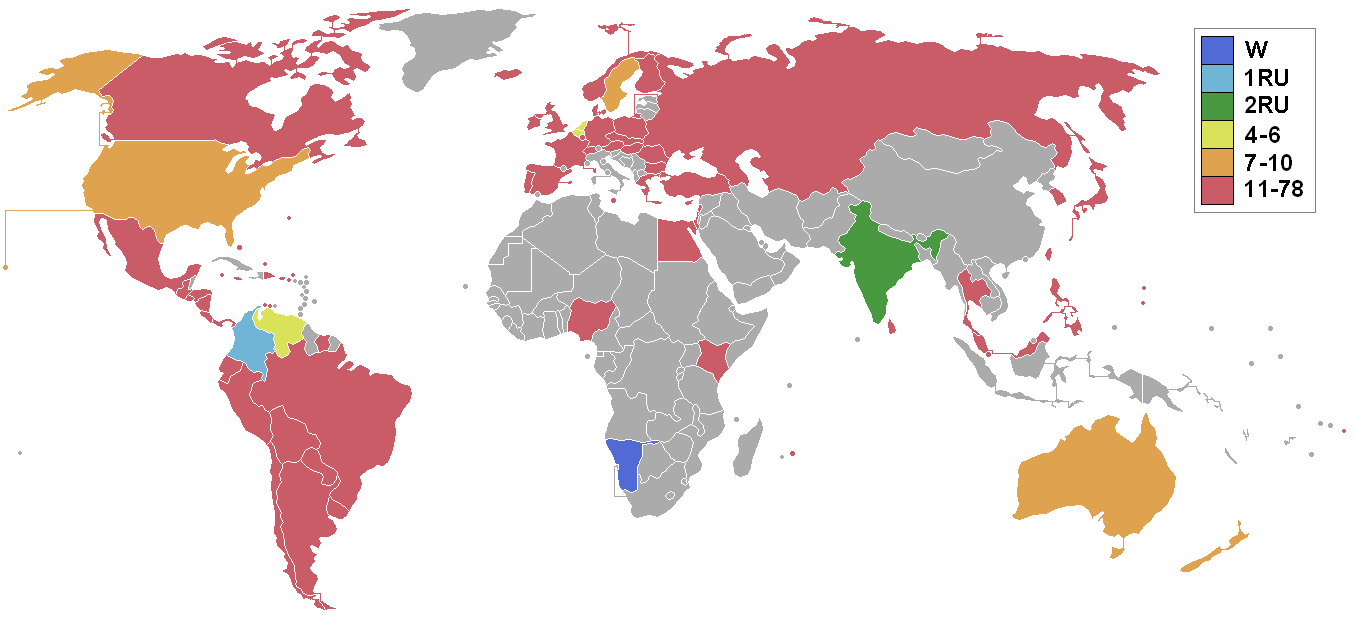
Miss Universe 1992 participating nations and results

=== Placements ===
Placement	Contestant
Miss Universe 1992	Namibia – Michelle McLean
1st Runner-Up	Colombia – Paola Turbay
2nd Runner-Up	India – Madhu Sapre
Top 6	Belgium – Anke Van dermeersch; Netherlands – Vivian Jansen; Venezuela – Carolina Izsak
Top 10	Australia – Georgina Denahy; New Zealand – Lisa de Montalk; Sweden – Monica Brodd; United States – Shannon Marketic

== Contestants ==
- Argentina – Laura Rafael
- Aruba – Yerusha Rasmijn
- Australia – Georgina Denahy
- Austria – Karin Friedl
- Bahamas – Fontella Chipman
- Belgium – Anke Van dermeersch
- Bermuda – Colita Joseph
- Bolivia – Natasha Gabriel Arana
- Brazil – Maria Carolina Otto
- British Virgin Islands – Alicia Burke
- Bulgaria – Michaella Dinova Nikolova
- Canada – Nicole Dunsdon
- Cayman Islands – Yvette Peggy Jordison
- Chile – Marcela Vacarezza
- CIS – Lidia Kuborskaya
- Colombia – Paola Turbay
- Cook Islands – Jeannine Tuavera
- Costa Rica – Jessica Manley Fredrich
- Curaçao – Mijanou de Paula
- Cyprus – Militsa Papadopolou
- Czechoslovakia – Michaela Maláčová
- Denmark – Anne Mette Voss
- Dominican Republic – Ana Eliza González
- Ecuador – Soledad Diab
- Egypt – Lamia Noshi
- El Salvador – Melissa Salazar
- Finland – Kirsi Syrjänen
- France – Linda Hardy
- Germany – Monica Resch
- Great Britain – Tiffany Stanford
- Greece – Marina Tsintikidou
- Guam – Cheryl Debra Payne
- Guatemala – Nancy Maricela Perez
- Honduras – Monica Raquel Rapalo
- Hungary – Dora Patko
- Iceland – Svava Haraldsdóttir
- India – Madhu Sapre
- Ireland – Jane Thompson
- Israel – Eynat Zmora
- Jamaica – Bridgette Rhoden
- Japan – Akiko Ando
- Kenya – Aisha Wawira Lieberg
- Lebanon – Abeer Sharrouf
- Luxembourg – Carole Reding
- Malaysia – Crystal Yong
- Malta – Julienne Camilleri
- Mauritius – Stephanie Raymond
- Mexico – Monica Zuñiga
- Namibia – Michelle McLean
- Netherlands – Vivian Jansen
- New Zealand – Lisa de Montalk
- Nicaragua – Ida Patricia Delaney
- Nigeria – Sandra Guenefred Petgrave
- Northern Mariana Islands – Imelda Antonio
- Norway – Anne Sofie Galaen
- Panama – Ana Orillac
- Paraguay – Pamela Zarza
- Peru – Aline Arce Santos
- Philippines – Elizabeth Garcia Berroya
- Poland – Izabela Filipowska
- Portugal – Maria Fernanda Silva
- Puerto Rico – Daisy Garcia
- Republic of China – Vivian Shih Hsiu Chieh
- Romania – Corina Corduneanu
- Singapore – Cori Teo
- South Korea – Lee Young-hyun
- Spain – Virginia García
- Sri Lanka – Hiranthi Divapriya
- Suriname – Nancy Kasanngaloewar
- Sweden – Monica Brodd
- Switzerland – Sandra Aegerter
- (Thailand) Thailand – Orn-anong Panyawong
- Turkey – Elif Ilgaz
- Turks and Caicos Islands – Barbara Johnson
- United States – Shannon Marketic
- United States Virgin Islands – Cathy-Mae Sitaram
- Uruguay – Gabriela Escobar Ventura
- Venezuela – Carolina Izsak

== Notes ==
=== Debuts ===
- CIS
- Hungary

=== Returns ===
Last competed in 1987:

- Cyprus
- Kenya

Last competed in 1989:

- New Zealand

Last competed in 1990:

- Aruba
- Australia
- Austria
- Denmark
- Egypt
- Honduras
- Portugal
- Switzerland

== Notes ==
=== Replacements ===
- Israel — Eynat Zmora, the first runner-up in the Miss Israel pageant, was sent to Miss Universe because the winner, Ravit Asaf, was under the age restriction of 18 years.
- CIS — Julia Etina, Miss CIS 1992, did not compete in Miss Universe 1992, because she had turned 18 years old after 1 February. Her first runner-up of Miss CIS 1992, Lydia Kuborskaya went to Miss Universe instead of her. However, Etina got an official visit to the United States as a consolation prize for missing the big event.
- Ireland — Jane Thompson replaced Amanda Brunker because Brunker was underage before 1 February.
- Republic of China — Wu Pei-Chun, Miss Universe Republic of China 1992, was underage before 1 February. Her first runner-up, Liu Yu-Hsin couldn't go either due to her health problems. So the chance was given to her second runner-up, Vivian Shih Hsiu-Chieh, who went to the pageant instead.
- Spain – Sofía Mazagatos, Miss España 1991, did not compete because she was underage before 1 February. Her first runner-up, Virginia García went instead of her.

=== Withdrawals ===
- Belize – Their pageant was delayed until Fall 1992.
- Ghana – Jamilla Haruna Danzuru – Due to lack of funds & visa problems. She went to compete in Miss Universe 1993.
- Hong Kong — Amy Kwok was expected to represent Hong Kong and even arrived in Bangkok for the pageant, but was disqualified because she did not meet residency requirements. Kwok was an American resident, who became the first overseas contestant to win the Miss Hong Kong title. The same issue would come up again in Miss Universe 1996 when the winner, Winnie Yeung, was also an American citizen and was also disqualified. The first runner-up in that pageant, Sofie Rahman, was her replacement.
- Italy – Miss Italia 1991, Martina Colombari, could not compete due to being underage. She was not replaced. Therefore, this is Italy's first ever withdrawal at Miss Universe since its inception in 1952. They would only withdraw again in 2006.
- Gibraltar – Ornella Costa – She was underage prior to 1 February.
- Saint Vincent and the Grenadines – Nicole Hendrickson – Due to lack of sponsorship.
- Soviet Union – Collapsed in 1991 to be split into fifteen countries. Twelve of them were aggregated into the CIS. Four years later, Miss USSR 1991, Ilmira Shamsuttinova was appointed to compete in the pageant as Miss Russia.
- Trinidad and Tobago – Rachel Charles – She was underage before 1 February. She competed in 1993 instead.
- Yugoslavia – Slavica Tripunović – Due to the breakup in April, there were a lack of funds to send her in the pageant. In addition, the organizing committee was dissolved. The country would later return in 1998.
- Ukraine – Miss Ukraine 1992, Oksana Szabo, was invited to compete in the Miss Universe 1992, but due to a lack of founds and sponsorship, she didn't go. Ukraine finally debuted at Miss Universe 1995.
