= Brodd =

Brodd is a Swedish surname. Notable people with the surname include:

- Bruno Brodd (1886–1956), American javelin thrower
- Eskil Brodd (1885–1969), Swedish diver
- Monica Brodd (born 1973), Swedish beauty pageant contestant
- Paulina Brodd (born 1994), Swedish model and beauty pageant winner
- Yngve Brodd (1930–2016), Swedish footballer
