= Miss Seychelles Universe =

National beauty pageant competition in Seychelles

Miss Seychelles Universe Organization
- Formation: 1994; 32 years ago
- Type: Beauty pageant
- Headquarters: Victoria
- Location: Seychelles
- Members: Miss Universe
- Official languages: English; French; Seychellois Creole
- President: Tery Carola

Miss Seychelles Universe is a national Beauty pageant in Seychelles where the winner is sent to Miss Universe. The current Miss Seychelles Universe 2022 is Gabriella Gonthier of Mahé.

== History ==
Began 1995 an agency, Telly's Modelling Agency in Seychelles took over the license of Miss Universe pageant. The 1st edition of Miss Kreol 1994 winner sent to Miss Universe 1995 in Namibia. After so many years Seychelles absent at Miss Universe, in 2022 Tery Carola (President of Miss Seychelles Universe) successfully took Miss Universe license back for Seychelles.

=== Directorships ===
- Miss Kreol, Telly's Modelling Agency (1994–1995)
- Tery Carola (2022—present)

== Titleholders ==
Year	Miss Seychelles Universe	District
1994	Maria Payet	Victoria
2022	Gabriella Gonthier	Mahé

== Titleholders under Miss Universe Seychelles org. ==
=== Miss Universe Seychelles ===
- : Declared as Winner
- : Ended as runner-up or top 5/6 qualification
- : Ended as one of the finalists or semi-finalists
- : Ended as special awards winner

Miss Seychelles has started to send the winner to Miss Universe in 1995. On occasion, when the winner does not qualify (due to age) for either contest, a runner-up is sent.

Year	District	Miss Universe Seycheclles	Placement at Miss Universe	Special Award(s)	Notes
Did not compete between 2023-present
Tery Carola directorship — a franchise holder to Miss Universe from 2022
Did not compete from 2023: Changes in management at Miss Universe have made it difficult for several license holders to obtain licenses in their countries. Seychelles is one of the countries that canceled the 2023 license bidding.
2022	Mahé	Gabriella Gonthier	Unplaced		
Miss Kreol - Telly's Modelling Agency directorship — a franchise holder to Miss Universe in 1995
Did not compete between 1996—2021
1995	Victoria	Maria Payet	Unplaced		

=== Wins by district ===
District	Titles	Years
Mahé	1	2022
Victoria	1	1995
