= Manpreet Brar =

Indian actress and model (born 1973)

Manpreet Kaur Brar
- Born: 9 June 1973 (age 53); Jalandhar, Punjab, India
- Occupation: Model
- Height: 173 cm (5 ft 8 in)
- Beauty pageant titleholder
- Title: Femina Miss India Universe 1995
- Major competitions: Femina Miss India Universe 1995 (Winner); Miss Universe 1995 (1st Runner-Up)

Manpreet Kaur Brar is an Indian actress, model and beauty pageant titleholder. She won the Miss India 1995, and was the first runner-up at the 1995 Miss Universe pageant.

== Early life ==
Manpreet was born on 9 June 1973 to a Brar Jat Sikh family in Mizoram, India. She graduated from Lady Irwin College, Delhi and was an honours student of Community Resource Management and Extension. Manpreet was also the college president in her final year.

== Career ==
Brar was crowned Femina Miss India Universe 1995 by the reigning Miss Universe Sushmita Sen. She participated in the Miss Universe 1995 held in Namibia and was crowned 1st Runner-Up behind Miss USA Chelsi Smith. Upon her return to India she did several fashion shows. Brar modeled an ethnic wardrobe designed by Ritu Kumar and financed by The Times of India.

Besides winning the Femina Miss India title in 1995, she also became the first runner-up at the Miss Universe pageant the same year. She was a brand ambassador for the watch company Omega. She was also the host of the Filmfare Awards, Graviera Manhunt and AD Club awards. She hosted several TV shows like Star Miss India, BPL Oye and Mangta Hai on Channel V.

== Personal life ==
Manpreet is married to Arjun Walia, with whom she has two children. She is an self-professed eggetarian.

== Awards ==
Awards and achievements
Preceded by (Colombia) Carolina Gómez	Miss Universe 1st Runner-Up; 1995	Succeeded by (Aruba) Taryn Mansell
Preceded by Sushmita Sen	Miss Universe India; 1995	Succeeded by Sandhya Chib
