= Anke Van dermeersch =

Belgian politician (born 1972)

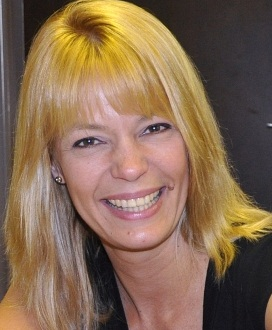
- Van dermeersch in 2011

Senator of Belgium
- Incumbent
- Assumed office 2003

Personal details
- Born: 27 October 1972 (age 53) Antwerp, Belgium
- Party: Vlaams Blok (until 2004); Vlaams Belang (from 2004)
- Website: ankevandermeersch.be

Anke Maria Flor Van dermeersch (born 27 October 1972) is a Belgian politician, former model and beauty pageant titleholder who was crowned Miss Belgium 1991. She has later been a politician for the Vlaams Belang party, being elected as a senator in 2003.

== Pageantry and law ==
Anke Van dermeersch rose to attention in Belgium during a modelling career, becoming Miss Belgium in 1991. She represented her country at Miss Universe 1992 where she placed Top 6. She thereafter completed a law degree and became a lawyer before eventually entering politics.

== Political career ==
Van dermeersch became a directly elected Belgian senator in 2003 for the far-right party Vlaams Blok, which was succeeded by Vlaams Belang in 2004. Since 2019, she has been a member of the Flemish parliament. She has also been the leader of a counter-jihad group called Women Against Islamization.
