= Thai Sky TV =

Thai Sky TV (ไทยสกายทีวี) was a satellite television operator that existed in Thailand between 1991 and 1997, owned by Siam Broadcasting Company Limited, a unit of MCOT.

== History ==
Siam Broadcasting Company was registered in June 1990. Thai Sky TV launched test signals on 26 August 1991. These became regular in September 1991. TSTV used MMDS to deliver its signals, similar to IBC, its competitor. Under this system, TSTV carried three channels. At the time, the installation fee for TSTV was higher than that of IBC: TSTV charged 1000 baht per subscription while IBC charged only 600.

On 27 December 1993, the government approved the expansion of TSTV and UBC services outside of Bangkok. Both companies were facing competition from Star TV. A TSTV executive announced plans to relay to 31 provinces using a VSAT transponder. The companies moved to the Thaicom satellite in 1994. Negotiations were held in March of the same year to form a possible joint with Star TV, with the likely outcome of using TSTV's satellite as Star's inroad for Thailand. Parent company Wattachai was restructuring TSTV in order to be more competitive with IBC.

As of 1995, the company was owned by Wattachak plc. TSTV and UBC on 5 April 1995 signed contracts with Shinawatra Satellite, owned by Thaksin Shinawatra.

TSTV shut down in August 1997 as an effect of the 1997 Asian financial crisis. The company was unable to find a satellite to continue providing its service.

Its former signals were reused by a new company, World Star, in 2001, which planned a 12-channel digital service, yet initially restricted to three analog channels.

== Channels ==
At the end, TSTV was broadcasting 5 channels of local content, along with 7 foreign channels:

- In-house news channel
- Smile TV: in-house music video channel
- TNT & Cartoon Network
- Star Movies
- Star Sports
- in-house variety channel, with programming produced by Kantana
- ESPN
- CNN International
- BBC World
- Star World
- In-house Buddhist channel
- In-house Christian channel
