= Miss Universe 1984 =

33rd Miss Universe pageant

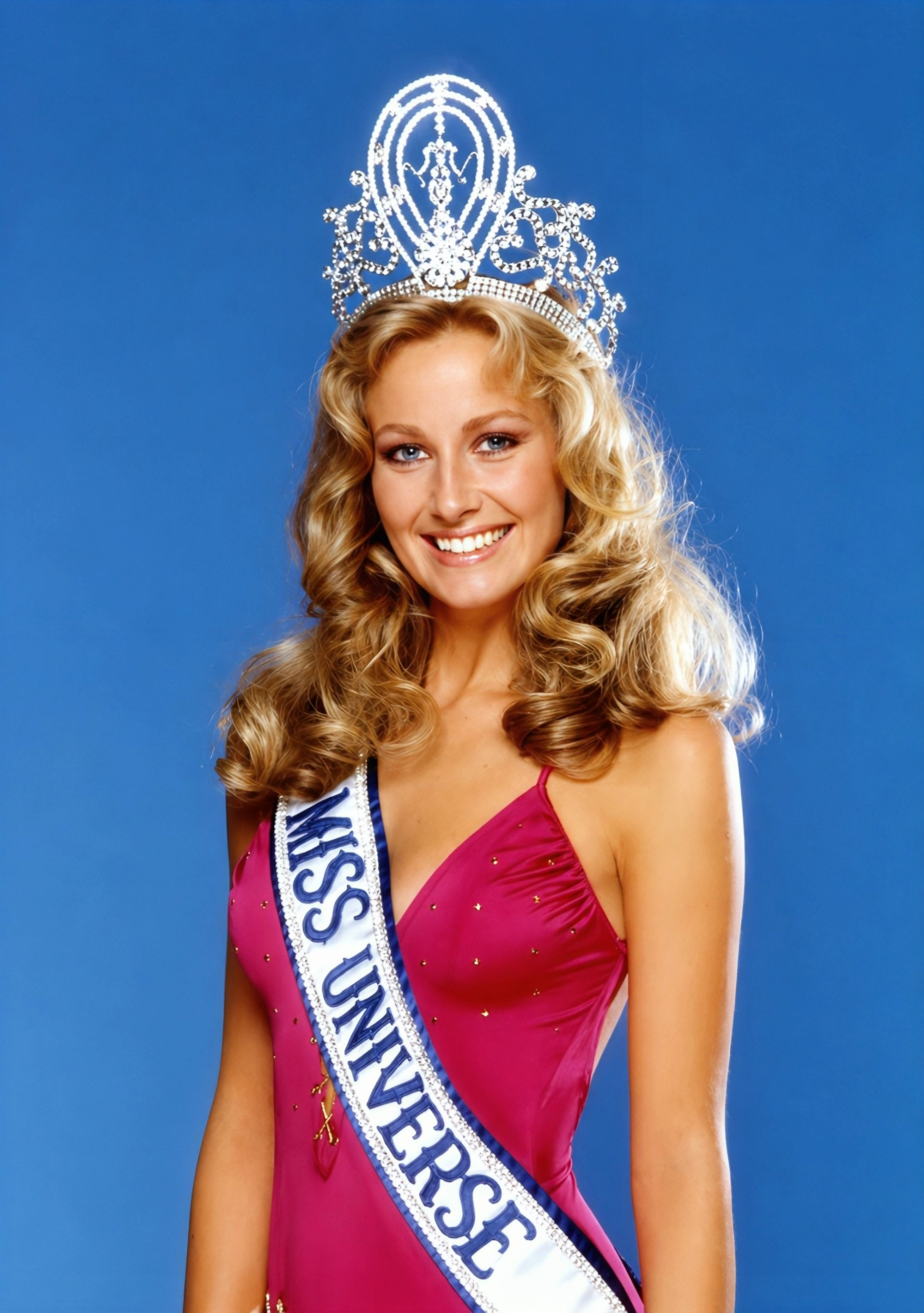
- Yvonne Ryding
- Date: 9 July 1984
- Presenters: Bob Barker; Joan Van Ark
- Entertainment: Tom Jones; Miami Sound Machine
- Venue: James L. Knight Convention Center, Miami, Florida, United States
- Broadcaster: CBS (WTVJ)
- Entrants: 81
- Placements: 10
- Withdrawals: Bahamas; Indonesia; Sri Lanka; Transkei
- Returns: Barbados; Luxembourg; Poland; Yugoslavia; Zaire
- Winner: Yvonne Ryding; Sweden
- Congeniality: Jessica Palao (Gibraltar)
- Best National Costume: Juhi Chawla (India)
- Photogenic: Garbiñe Abasolo (Spain)

Miss Universe 1984 was the 33rd Miss Universe pageant, held at the James L. Knight Convention Center in Miami, Florida, United States, on 9 July 1984.

Lorraine Downes of New Zealand crowned Yvonne Ryding of Sweden as her successor at the conclusion of the event. This was the third time that a Swedish woman had won Miss Universe, following Hillevi Rombin in 1955 and Margareta Arvidsson in 1966.

== Background ==
=== Location and date ===
Initially,the host city for the 1988 Winter Olympics Calgary, Alberta, Canada was chosen as host city for the pageant, a decision announced on March 13, 1984. Funding issues arose within days when the city council would not allow the tourist bureau to commit permanent funds to the event. An agreement was reached whereby funds from the city could be used but had to be repaid, although some complained about "using sex to sell the city". By late April there were indications that the pageant might be moved to Miami, Florida due to the continued financial issues, but that negotiations in the hope of Calgary retaining the event were ongoing. Despite the attempts of Calgary's Tourist Bureau, Miami was officially announced as the new venue on 12 May 1984, a decision which cost Calgary $125,000 and left the city facing a potential lawsuit from Miss Universe Inc., the pageant owner.

== Results ==
=== Placements ===
Placement	Contestant
Miss Universe 1984	Sweden – Yvonne Ryding
1st Runner-Up	South Africa – Letitia Snyman
2nd Runner-Up	Venezuela – Carmen María Montiel
3rd Runner-Up	Philippines – Desiree Verdadero
4th Runner-Up	Colombia – Susana Caldas
Top 10	Guatemala – Ilma Urrutia; Holland – Nancy Neede; Thailand – Savinee Pakaranang; United States – Mai Shanley; West Germany – Brigitta Berx

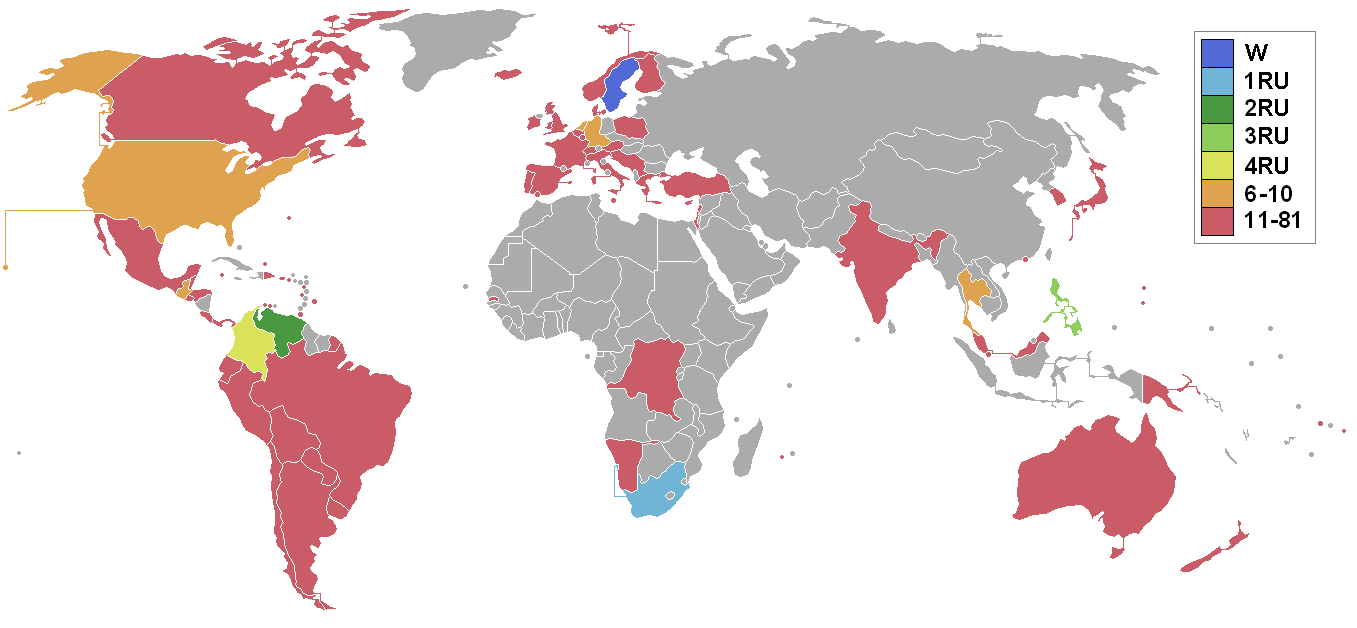
Miss Universe 1984 participating nations and results

== Contestants ==
The contestants were as follows:

- Argentina – Leila Adar
- Aruba – Jacqueline van Putten
- Australia – Donna Rudrum
- Austria – Michaela Nussbaumer
- Barbados – Lisa Worme
- Belgium – Brigitte Muyshondt
- Belize – Lisa Ramirez
- Bermuda – Rhonda Wilkinson
- Bolivia – Lourdes Aponte
- Brazil – Ana Elisa Flores
- British Virgin Islands – Donna Frett
- Canada – Cynthia Kereluk
- Cayman Islands – Thora Crighton
- Chile – Carol Bahnke
- Colombia – Susana Caldas
- Cook Islands – Margaret Brown
- Costa Rica – Silvia Portilla
- Curaçao – Suzanne Verbrugge
- Cyprus – Zsa Zsa Melodias
- Denmark – Catharina Clausen
- Dominican Republic – Sumaya Heinsen
- Ecuador – Leonor Gonzenbach
- El Salvador – Ana Lorena Samagoa
- England – Louise Gray
- Finland – Anna Tilus
- France – Martine Robine
- French Guiana – Rose Nicole Lony
- Gambia – Mirabel Carayol
- Gibraltar – Jessica Palao
- Greece – Peggy Dogani
- Guadeloupe – Martine Seremes
- Guam – Eleanor Benavente
- Guatemala – Ilma Urrutia
- Holland – Nancy Neede
- Honduras – Myrtice Hyde
- Hong Kong – Joyce Godenzi
- Iceland – Berglind Johansson
- India – Juhi Chawla
- Ireland – Patricia Nolan
- Israel – Sapir Koffmann
- Italy – Raffaella Baracchi
- Japan – Megumi Niiyama
- Lebanon – Susan El Sayed
- Luxembourg – Romy Bayeri
- Malaysia – Latifah Hamid
- Malta – Marisa Sammut
- Martinique – Danielle Cléry
- Mexico – Elizabeth Broden
- Namibia – Petra Harley Peters
- New Zealand – Tania Clague
- Northern Mariana Islands – Porsche Salas
- Norway – Ingrid Martens
- Panama – Cilinia Prada
- Papua New Guinea – Patricia Mirisa
- Paraguay – Elena Ortiz
- Peru – Fiorella Ferrari
- Philippines – Desiree Verdadero
- Poland – Joanna Karska
- Portugal – Maria de Fátima Jardim
- Puerto Rico – Sandra Beauchamp
- Réunion – Marie Lise Gigan
- Scotland – May Monaghan
- Singapore – Violet Lee
- South Africa – Letitia Snyman
- South Korea – Mi-sook Lim
- Spain – Garbiñe Abasolo
- Sweden – Yvonne Ryding
- Switzerland – Silvia Afolter
- Thailand – Savinee Pakaranang
- Trinidad and Tobago – Gina Tardieu
- Turkey – Gurcin Ulker
- Turks and Caicos Islands – Deborah Lindsey
- United States – Mai Shanley
- United States Virgin Islands – Patricia Graham
- Uruguay – Yissa Pronzatti
- Venezuela – Carmen María Montiel
- Wales – Jane Riley
- West Germany – Brigitta Berx
- Western Samoa – Lena Slade
- Yugoslavia – Kresinja Borojevic
- Zaire – Lokange Lwali

== Notes ==
=== Withdrawals ===
- Bahamas – Pamela Lois Parker withdrew after the Miss Bahamas owner boycotted the contest due to South Africa being allowed to participate.
- Indonesia – Titi Dwi Jayati
- Sri Lanka – Nilmini Iddamalgoda was depressed and homesick.
- Transkei – Competed as South Africa since then.
