= Eleonora Carrillo =

Salvadoran model

- Born: Eleonora Beatrice Carrillo Alammani; San Salvador, El Salvador
- Beauty pageant titleholder
- Title: Miss El Salvador 1995
- Hair color: blonde
- Eye color: brown
- Major competitions: Miss Universe 1995 (Top 10)

Eleonora Carrillo is a Salvadoran model and beauty pageant titleholder who participated in the 44th edition of Miss Universe pageant, held in Windhoek, Namibia.

== Miss Universe 1995 ==
In Miss Universe, Eleonora Carrillo placed in the semifinals; making it the first time El Salvador was placed in a Miss Universe contest since Carmen Elena Figueroa's participation in 1975. Although she had the highest score in the interview session, she had the lowest score in both the swimsuit and evening gown portion, which ultimately cost her a spot in the Top 6.

== Personal life ==
Born in San Salvador, her father, son of the Salvadoran ambassador to the U.N., met her mother when he went to school in Turin. Her mother, Beatrice Alamanni de Carrillo, moved to El Salvador, was naturalized, and became human rights advocate. In 2001, she became Attorney for the Defense of Human Rights, created after the Salvadoran Civil War, until her term ended in 2007.

After doing some modeling in Italy, Carrillo currently lives in Spain and works as an attorney.
