= Chelsi Smith =

American actress (1973–2018)

- Smith as Miss Universe 1995
- Born: Chelsi Mariam Pearl Smith; August 23, 1973; Redwood City, California, U.S.
- Died: September 8, 2018 (aged 45); Mifflin, Pennsylvania, U.S.
- Spouse: Kelly Blair (m. 1996; div. 2001)
- Beauty pageant titleholder
- Title: Miss Texas USA 1995; Miss USA 1995; Miss Universe 1995
- Major competitions: Miss Texas USA 1995; (Winner); Miss USA 1995; (Winner); Miss Universe 1995; (Winner)

Chelsi Mariam Pearl Smith (August 23, 1973 – September 8, 2018) was an American actress, singer, TV host and beauty queen who was crowned Miss USA 1995 and Miss Universe 1995. Smith was the third Miss USA of African-American origin, after Carole Gist (1990) and Kenya Moore (1993), in addition to being the sixth American woman to win Miss Universe and the first since Shawn Weatherly was crowned Miss Universe 1980.

== Early life ==
Chelsi Mariam Pearl Smith was born in Redwood City, California, to 19-year-old parents Craig Smith, an African-American maintenance man, and Mary Denise Trimble, a white American secretary. Her parents divorced before she was two, and her mother, an alcoholic at the time, granted Smith's maternal grandparents Barnie and Jeanette custody of her.

When Smith was seven years old, she moved to Kingwood, Texas, where her grandparents would later get divorced. Smith grew up in a divided home while she attended high school in Deer Park, Texas. Prior to her win at Miss USA, she was a sophomore majoring in education at San Jacinto College.

== Pageantry ==
=== Miss Texas USA ===
Smith competed in her first major beauty contest in 1994, when she was a semifinalist in the Miss Texas USA pageant, as Miss South East Texas USA. The following year, she competed again as Miss Galveston County USA, and won the title, as well as the Miss Congeniality award. Smith, a multiracial American, was the first titleholder of African-American heritage in the pageant's history.

=== Miss USA 1995 ===
Smith went on to compete and win at Miss USA 1995 on February 10, 1995. In the top three final question. When asked how she, as an advisor, would change the First Lady's image if asked for a consultation, Smith replied:

I would tell her not to change her image, actually. I believe very strongly in who I am, and I've seen 50 ladies tonight who believe very strongly in who they are, and I really think that she wouldn't have made it as far as she has if she wouldn't have been herself, so I really truly think she should stay exactly the way she is."

She became the seventh woman from her state to hold the Miss USA title and also won the Miss Congeniality award as she had at her state pageant, becoming the only Miss USA winner and Miss Texas USA in history to win this award.

After her win, Smith appeared as a celebrity contestant on Wheel of Fortune and as an award presenter at the People's Choice Awards.

=== Miss Universe 1995 ===
After winning Miss USA, Smith competed and won at Miss Universe 1995, at the Windhoek Country Club, Windhoek, on May 12, 1995. Her national costume was a suffragist. She was the highest placed contestant after the preliminary competition, which pushed her into the top ten. The first runner-up was Manpreet Brar of India, and Smith became the first Miss USA and sixth representative to win Miss Universe in 15 years. At the end of her reign, she crowned Alicia Machado of Venezuela as her successor.

== Life after Miss Universe ==
As a model, Smith worked for Hawaiian Tropic, Jantzen, Pontiac, Venus Swimwear, and Pure Protein among others. She made appearances on Martin, Due South and the TLC documentary The History of the Bathing Suit.

With the support of Music World Entertainment/Sony, Smith co-wrote and recorded with producer Damon Elliott her first single, "Dom Da Da", part of the soundtrack for The Sweetest Thing, starring Cameron Diaz. In 2003, she appeared in the independent film Playas Ball, where she co-starred with Allen Payne and Elise Neal. She also co-hosted Beyoncé's special Beyonce: Family and Friends Tour on pay-per-view and appeared on HBO in Saladin Patterson's short film One Flight Stand with Marc Blucas and Aisha Tyler. She was a judge at the 2006 Miss Teen USA pageant and a guest judge for the Miss Peru 2016 beauty pageant.

In 2011, she was presented with the Influential Multiracial Public Figure award.

Smith married and later divorced fitness coach Kelly Blair, and after her reign as Miss Universe moved to Los Angeles.

== Death ==
Smith was diagnosed with liver cancer in 2017. She died at her mother's home in Mifflin, Pennsylvania, aged 45 on September 8, 2018.

== Legacy ==
During the 74th edition of the Miss USA pageant on October 24, 2025, it was announced that the Miss Congeniality Award would be renamed in Smith's honor.

Awards and achievements
Preceded by (India) Sushmita Sen	Miss Universe; 1995	Succeeded by (Venezuela) Alicia Machado
Preceded by Lu Parker, South Carolina	Miss USA; 1995	Succeeded by Shanna Moakler, New York
Preceded by Christine Friedel	Miss Texas USA; 1995	Vacant Title next held by Kara Williams
