= María Mónica Urbina =

Colombian model and former beauty queen (born 1967)

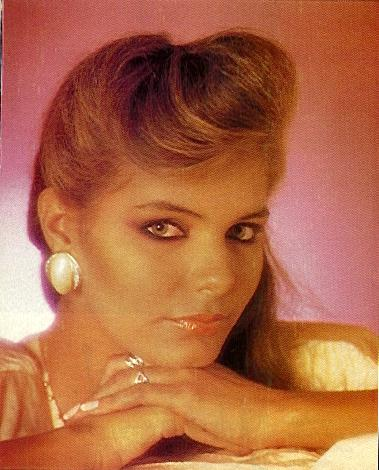
- Born: María Mónica Urbina Pugliesse; August 25, 1967 (age 59); Riohacha, La Guajira, Colombia
- Height: 5 ft 8 in (1.73 m)
- Beauty pageant titleholder
- Title: Miss Guajira 1985; Miss Colombia 1985
- Hair color: Dark brown
- Eye color: light Brown
- Major competitions: Miss Colombia 1985 (Winner); Miss Universe 1986 (2nd Runner-Up)

María Mónica Urbina Pugliesse (born August 25, 1967) is a Colombian former model and beauty pageant titleholder who won Miss Colombia 1985.

== Early life ==
Urbina, was born in Riohacha, La Guajira, daughter of Enrique Urbina Pinto and Rina Pugliese, the latter daughter of Italian migrants.

== Pageantry ==
=== Miss Colombia ===
Within her responsibilities as Miss Guajira, she competed in the 33rd edition of Miss Colombia along with 18 contestants from different regions of Colombia, on November 11, 1985, in the city of Cartagena, Bolívar, where she was the winner of the night, winning the title of Miss Colombia 1985, being the first time that a representative of La Guajira is Miss Colombia.

=== Miss Universe ===
As Miss Colombia, Urbina competed with 77 contestants in the 35th edition of the Miss Universe pageant, held at the Atlapa Convention Centre in Panama City on July 21, 1986, where she finished as second runner-up.

Awards and achievements
Preceded by Sandra Borda Caldas	Miss Colombia; 1985	Succeeded by María Patricia López
Preceded by Clarena Barros Gnecco	Miss Guajira; 1985	Succeeded by Soraima González Paz
