= Susana Caldas =

Colombian beauty pageant titleholder

- Born: Susana Caldas Lamaitre; April 5, 1964 (age 62); Cartagena, Bolivar, Colombia
- Height: 1.70 m (5 ft 7 in)
- Beauty pageant titleholder
- Title: Miss Bolivar 1983; Miss Colombia 1983
- Hair color: Light brown
- Eye color: Green
- Major competitions: Miss Colombia 1983 (Winner); Miss Universe 1984 (4th Runner-Up)

Susana Caldas Lamaitre (born April 5, 1964) is a Colombian architect and beauty pageant titleholder who was crowned Miss Colombia 1983. Caldas finished as fourth runner-up in Miss Universe 1984.

Awards and achievements
Preceded by (England) Karen Moore	Miss Universe 4th Runner-Up; 1984	Succeeded by (Uruguay) Andrea Lopez
Preceded by Julie Pauline Sáez	Miss Colombia; 1983	Succeeded by Sandra Borda Caldas
Preceded by Cecilia Margarita López	Miss Bolivar; 1983	Succeeded by Sandra Borda Caldas
