= Nicole Haughton =

Jamaican beauty pageant titleholder

- Beauty pageant titleholder
- Title: Miss Jamaica Universe
- Agency: Pulse
- Major competition: Miss Jamaica World (Runner Up) Miss Jamaica Universe 1999, Miss Universe 1999 (Top Ten)

Nicole Haughton (born January 1975) is a Jamaican model and beauty pageant titleholder who was crowned Miss Jamaica Universe 1999.

== Pageantry career ==
Haughton, a graduate of Campion College, in Kingston, was encouraged to enter the 1999 Miss Jamaica Universe Pageant by the then 16 year old Author and journalist Legrek Parond, whom she had met while managing the family business, Haughton' Pharmacy in Spanish Town. It was through this chance encounter that afforded Legrek Parond his breakthrough, in landing a freelance journalism position at the Jamaica Observer Newspaper, and subsequently covering the 1999 Miss Universe Pageant in Trinidad, as a 16 year old accredited journalist.

Haughton represented her country at Miss Universe 1999 in Trinidad and Tobago and was a top ten finalist.
