= Miss Universe 1986 =

35th Miss Universe pageant

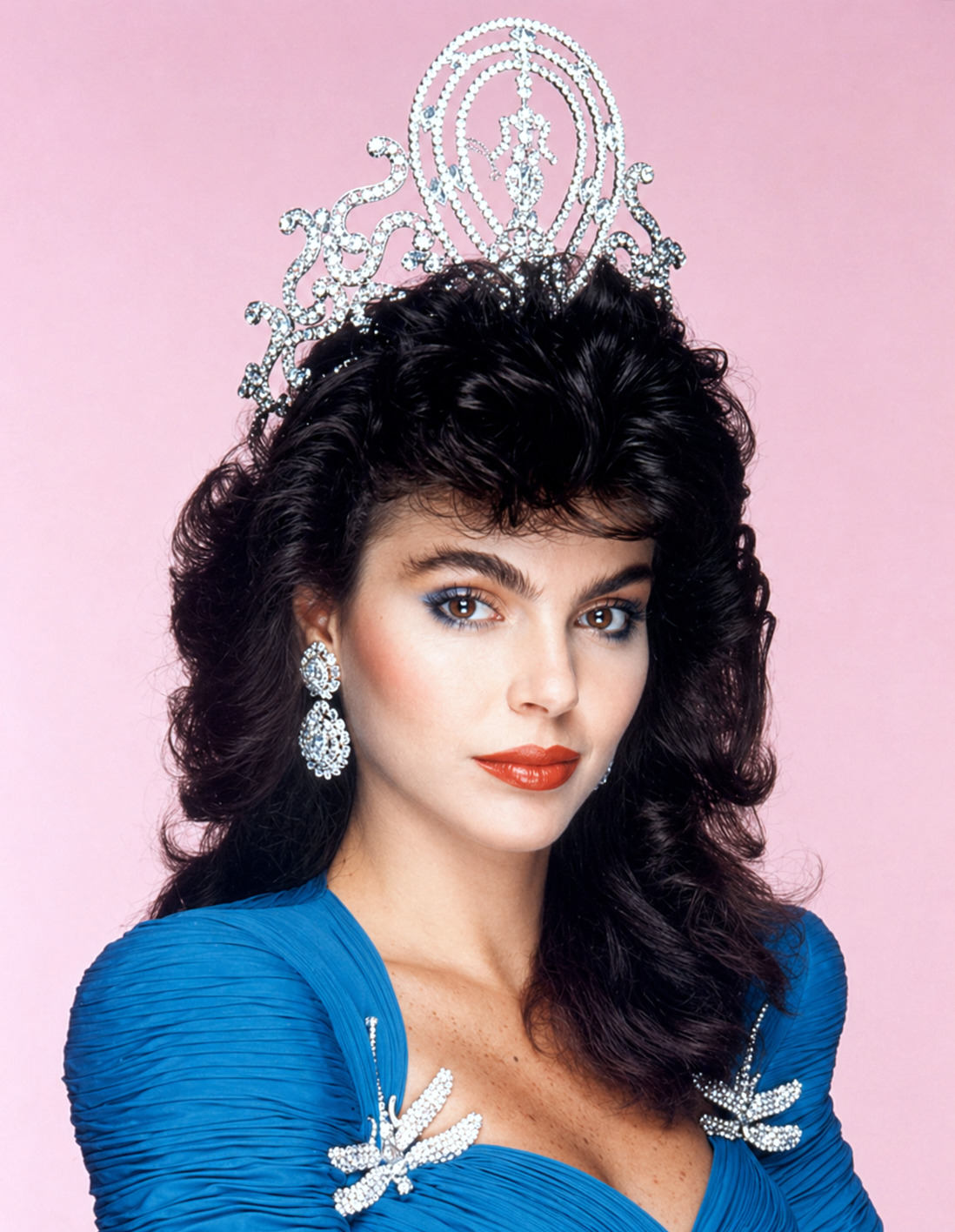
- Bárbara Palacios
- Date: 21 July 1986
- Presenters: Bob Barker; Mary Frann
- Entertainment: Miami Sound Machine
- Venue: Atlapa Convention Centre, Panama City, Panama
- Broadcaster: CBS (international); TVN (official broadcaster)
- Entrants: 77
- Placements: 10
- Debuts: Côte d'Ivoire
- Withdrawals: Bermuda; Cayman Islands; Dominica; Haiti; Senegal; Tahiti; Yugoslavia
- Returns: Aruba; Jamaica; Switzerland; Turkey
- Winner: Bárbara Palacios; Venezuela
- Congeniality: Dina Reyes Salas (Guam)
- Best National Costume: Gilda García (Panama)
- Photogenic: Susanna Huckstep (Italy)

Miss Universe 1986 was the 35th Miss Universe pageant, held at the Atlapa Convention Centre in Panama City, Panama, on 21 July 1986. At the conclusion of the event, Bárbara Palacios of Venezuela was crowned by Deborah Carthy-Deu of Puerto Rico. Seventy-seven contestants competed in this year.

== Results ==
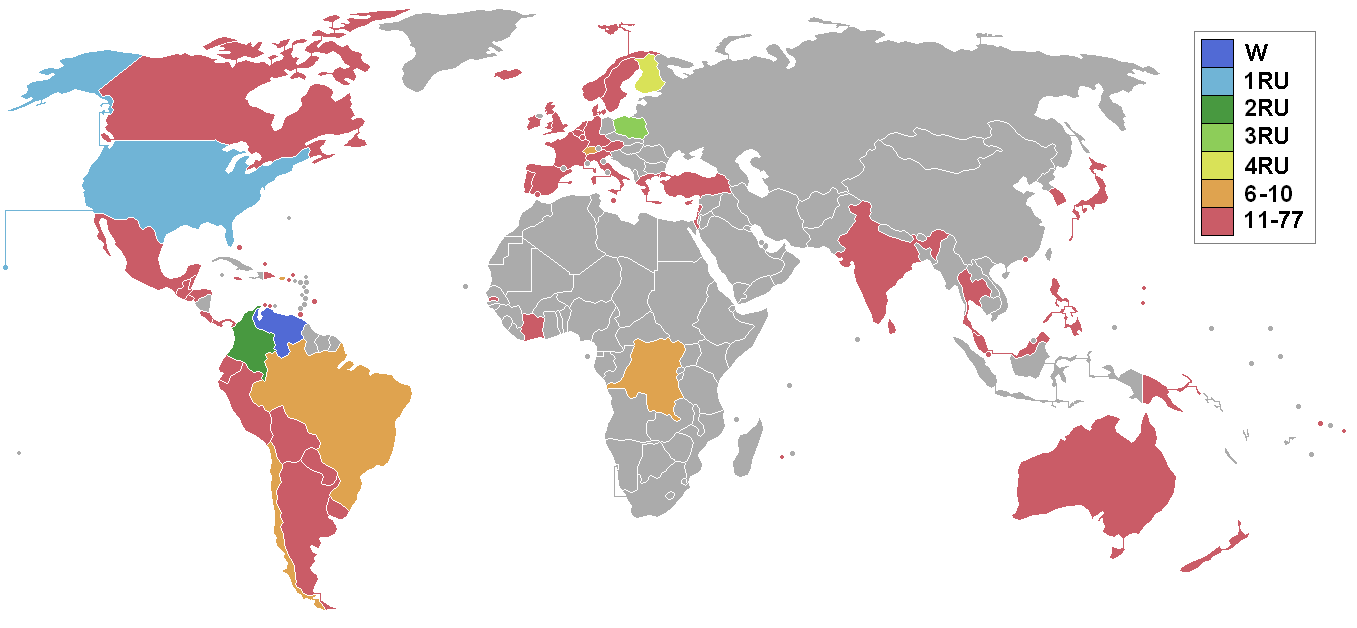
Miss Universe 1986 participating nations and results

=== Placements ===
Placement	Contestant
Miss Universe 1986	Venezuela – Bárbara Palacios
1st Runner-Up	United States – Christy Fichtner
2nd Runner-Up	Colombia – María Mónica Urbina
3rd Runner-Up	Poland – Brygida Bziukiewicz
4th Runner-Up	Finland – Tuula Irmeli Polvi
Top 10	Brazil – Deise Nunes; Chile – Mariana Villasante; Puerto Rico – Elizabeth Robison; Switzerland – Eveline Glanzmann; Zaire – Aimée Dobala

== Contestants ==
- Argentina – María de los Ángeles Fernández Espadero
- Aruba – Mildred Jacqueline Semeleer
- Australia – Christina Lucinda Bucat
- Austria – Manuela Redtenbacher
- Bahamas – Marie Brown
- Barbados – Roslyn Irene Williams
- Belgium – Goedele Liekens
- Belize – Romy Ellen Taegar
- Bolivia – Elizabeth O'Connor-d'Arlach
- Brazil – Deise Nunes
- British Virgin Islands – Shereen Desmona Flax
- Canada – Renee Newhouse
- Chile – Mariana Villasante Aravena
- Colombia – María Mónica Urbina
- Cook Islands – Lorna Sawtell
- Costa Rica – Aurora Velásquez Arigño
- Côte d'Ivoire – Marie Françoise Kouame
- Curaçao – Christine Joyce Denise Sibilo
- Cyprus – Christina Vassaliadou
- Denmark – Helena Christensen
- Dominican Republic – Lissette Chamorro
- Ecuador – Verónica Lucía Sevilla Ledergerber
- El Salvador – Vicky Elizabeth Cañas Álvarez
- England – Joanne Ruth Sedgley
- Finland – Tuula Irmeli Polvi
- France – Catherine Carew
- Gambia – Rose Marie Eunson
- Gibraltar – Gail Anne May Francis
- Greece – Vasilia Mantaki
- Guam – Dina Ann Reyes Salas
- Guatemala – Christa Kalula Wellman Girón
- Holland – Caroline Veldkamp
- Honduras – Sandra Natalie Navarrete Romero
- Hong Kong – San Lee Robin Mae
- Iceland – Thora Thrastardóttir
- India – Mehr Jesia
- Ireland – Karen Ann Shevlin
- Israel – Nilly Drucker
- Italy – Susanna Huckstep
- Jamaica – Liliana Antoinette Cisneros
- Japan – Hiroko Esaki
- Lebanon – Reine Philip Barakat
- Luxembourg – Martine Pilot
- Malaysia – Betty Chee
- Malta – Antoinette Zerafa
- Mexico – Alejandrina Carranza Ancheta
- New Zealand – Christine Atkinson
- Northern Mariana Islands – Christine Guerrero
- Norway – Tone Anette Henriksen
- Panama – Gilda García
- Papua New Guinea – Anna Wild
- Paraguay – Johanna Eugenia Kelner Toja
- Peru – Karin Mercedes Lindemann García
- Philippines – Violeta Naluz
- Poland – Brygida Bziukiewicz
- Portugal – Mariana Dias Carriço
- Puerto Rico – Elizabeth Robison Latalladi
- Réunion – Geneviève Lebon
- Scotland – Natalie Devlin
- Singapore – Farah Lange
- South Korea – Young-ran Bae
- Spain – Concepción Tur Espinosa
- Sri Lanka – Indra Kumari
- Sweden – Anne Lena Rahmberg
- Switzerland – Eveline Nicole Glanzmann
- Thailand – Thaveeporn Klungpoy
- Trinidad and Tobago – Candace Jennings
- Turkey – Demet Başdemir
- Turks and Caicos Islands – Barbara Bulah Mae Capron
- United States – Christy Fichtner
- United States Virgin Islands – Jasmine Olivia Turner
- Uruguay – Norma Silvana García Lapitz
- Venezuela – Bárbara Palacios
- Wales – Tracey Rowlands
- West Germany – Birgit Jahn
- Western Samoa – Tui Kaye Hunt
- Zaire – Aimee Likobe Dobala
