= Suzanne Sablok =

Indian model (born c. 1967)

- Born: 1967 (age 58–59)
- Occupation: Model
- Height: 173 cm (5 ft 8 in)
- Beauty pageant titleholder
- Title: Femina Miss India Universe 1989/1990
- Major competitions: Miss Universe 1990 (top-10 finalists)

Suzanne Sablok (born c. 1967) is an Indian model and beauty pageant titleholder who was Miss India the years 1989–1990. She later represented India in the Miss Universe 1990 and became a semifinalist where she placed eighth, effectively ending a 16-year drought for the country at Miss Universe. During the telecast, the co-anchor showed preliminary results indicating that Suzanne had placed second in the preliminary swimsuit competition with a score of 8.15. However, the preliminary scores shown during the Parade of Nations indicate that Suzanne placed sixth in preliminary swimsuit with a score of 8.22, while she placed second in preliminary interview with a score of 8.15. It is unclear which preliminary scores announced were correct.

Preceded by Dolly Minhas	Miss India Universe; 1989	Succeeded by Christabelle Howie
