= Madhu Sapre =

Indian supermodel from Maharashtra (born 1971)

- Born: Madhushree Sapre; 14 July 1971 (age 55); Nagpur, Maharashtra, India
- Occupations: Model, actress
- Height: 5 ft 8 in (1.73 m)
- Spouse: Gian Maria Emendatori (m. 2001)
- Children: 1
- Beauty pageant titleholder
- Title: Femina Miss India Universe 1992; Miss Universe 1992 (2nd Runner Up)
- Hair color: Black
- Eye color: Black
- Major competitions: Femina Miss India Universe 1992 (Winner); Miss Universe 1992 (2nd Runner-Up)

Madhu Sapre (born 14 July 1971) is an Indian supermodel and beauty pageant titleholder. She won Femina Miss India in 1992.

== Career ==
In the 1990s, Sapre was an athlete who rose to fame when she started modeling at a very young age. As Miss India she represented India at the 1992 Miss Universe pageant, where she was the 2nd runner-up.

Madhu says "All the officials had told us that our answers had to be truthful," she says, "and coming from the heart. Nobody told us we had to be politically correct. I said what my heart told me and I lost. According to me, India has been in poverty for many years, so it was not going to suddenly change in one year by my becoming the prime minister. But there are other areas like art and sports in which we can improve. And being a sportsgirl I had suffered because we don't have the equipment and the grounds in India. In the brief time you get to answer I wanted to say all this but perhaps because of my inadequacy in English, I could not express myself." She has also acted in the 2003 film Boom.

Milind Soman, a male model and her then-boyfriend, posed nude with her in a print ad for Tuff Shoes. The social service branch of the Mumbai police had registered a case in August 1995 after Sapre and Soman posed in the nude, wearing only shoes and a python wrapped around them. Another case was filed under the Wildlife Protection Act against the advertising agency for illegal use of the python. The accused include the publishers and distributors of two magazines that featured the controversial ad, the advertising agency, the two models, and the photographers. The case lasted for 14 years, after which the courts acquitted the accused.

== Personal life ==
Sapre lives in Riccione, a small town on the east coast of Italy with her husband, Italian businessman Gian Maria Emendatori, and shuttles between India and Italy. They have a daughter together named Indira. She met Emendatori through mutual friends while he was in India on a holiday. They got married in 2001, after which she moved to Riccione.

== Filmography ==
Year	Title	Role	Language	Notes
2003	Boom	Anu Gaekwad	Hindi	

Preceded by Julia Lemigova	Miss Universe 2nd Runner-Up; 1992	Succeeded by Milka Chulina
