= Miss Universe 1995 =

44th Miss Universe pageant

- Date: 12 May 1995
- Presenters: Bob Goen; Daisy Fuentes
- Entertainment: Jon Secada
- Venue: Windhoek Country Club Resort, Windhoek, Namibia
- Broadcaster: CBS (international); NBC (official broadcaster)
- Entrants: 82
- Placements: 10
- Debuts: Seychelles; Ukraine; Zambia
- Withdrawals: Argentina; Belgium; Honduras; Luxembourg; Swaziland; Zimbabwe
- Returns: Belize; Bonaire; Czech Republic; Indonesia; Kenya; Nicaragua; South Africa; United States Virgin Islands
- Winner: Chelsi Smith; United States
- Congeniality: Toyin Raji (Nigeria)
- Best National Costume: María Reyes (Spain)
- Photogenic: Petra Hultgren (Sweden)

Miss Universe 1995 was the 44th Miss Universe pageant, held at the Windhoek Country Club Resort in Windhoek, Namibia on 12 May 1995. Chelsi Smith of the United States was crowned by Sushmita Sen of India at the conclusion of the event. This marks the first and so far only time the pageant has been held in Africa. Eighty-two contestants competed in this year.

== Results ==
=== Placements ===
Placement	Contestant
Miss Universe 1995	United States – Chelsi Smith
1st Runner-Up	India – Manpreet Brar
2nd Runner-Up	Canada – Lana Buchberger
Top 6	Puerto Rico – Desiree Lowry; Trinidad and Tobago – Arlene Peterkin; Venezuela – Denyse Floreano
Top 10	Colombia – Tatiana Castro; Dominican Republic – Cándida Lara; El Salvador – Eleonora Carrillo; South Africa – Augustine Masilela

=== Special awards ===
Award	Contestant
Miss Photogenic	(Sweden) Sweden – Petra Hultgren
Miss Congeniality	(Nigeria) Nigeria – Toyin Raji
Best National Costume	(Spain) Spain – María Reyes
Vibrance Most Beautiful Hair Award	Peru – Paola Dellepiane

== Contestants ==
Eighty-two contestants competed for the title.

Country/Territory	Contestant	Age (Note: Ages at the time of the pageant)	Hometown
Aruba	Marie-Denise Herrlein	20	San Nicolaas
Australia	Jacqueline Shooter	20	Gold Coast
(The Bahamas) Bahamas	Tenika Lindsay	20	Grand Bahama
Belize	Deborah Wade	20	Belmopan
Bolivia	Sandra Rivero	22	Santa Cruz de la Sierra
Bonaire	Donna Landwier	20	Kralendijk
Brazil	Renata Bessa	18	Contagem
British Virgin Islands	Elaine Patricia Henry	20	Tortola
Bulgaria	Boiana Dimitrova	18	Pleven
Canada	Lana Buchberger	20	Calgary
Cayman Islands	Anita Bush	22	Grand Cayman
Chile	Paola Falcone	20	Santiago
Colombia	Tatiana Castro	21	Bogotá
Cook Islands	Tarita Brown	20	Rarotonga
Costa Rica	Beatriz Alejandra Alvarado	19	Alajuela
Curaçao	Maruschka Jansen	24	Willemstad
Cyprus	Clara Davina Rainbow	18	Larnaca
Czech Republic	Eva Kotulánová	20	Brno
Denmark	Tina Dam	22	Aalborg
Dominican Republic	Cándida Lara	23	Santo Domingo
Ecuador	Radmila Pandžić	22	Manabí
Egypt	Nadia Ezz	22	Cairo
El Salvador	Eleonora Carrillo	19	San Salvador
Estonia	Enel Eha	19	Tallinn
Finland	Heli Pirhonen	20	Kitee
France	Corine Lauret	21	Réunion
Germany	Ilka Endres	25	Aachen
(United Kingdom) Great Britain	Sarah-Jane Southwick	19	Nottingham
Greece	Helen Papaioannou	25	Thessaloniki
Guam	Alia Tui Stevens	23	Chalan Pago-Ordot
Guatemala	Indira Chinchilla	23	Guatemala City
Hong Kong	Halina Tam	22	Hong Kong
Hungary	Andrea Harsanyi	20	Győr
Iceland	Margret Skuladóttir Sigurz	20	Reykjavík
India	Manpreet Brar	22	Delhi
Indonesia	Susanty Manuhutu	21	Jakarta
(Republic of Ireland) Ireland	Anna Marie McCarthy	23	Dublin
Israel	Yana Kalman	20	Tel Aviv
Italy	Alessandra Meloni	22	Cagliari
Jamaica	Justine Willoughby	23	Kingston
Japan	Narumi Saeki	19	Tokyo
Kenya	Josephine Wanjiku Mbatia	25	Nairobi
Malaysia	Suziela Azrai	18	Klang
Malta	Sonia Massa	20	Fleur-de-Lys
Mauritius	Marie Priscilla Mardaymootoo	25	Port Louis
Mexico	Luz María Zetina	21	Mexico City
Namibia	Patricia Burt	20	Windhoek
Netherlands	Chantal van Woensel	22	Zeeland
New Zealand	Shelley Edwards	23	Auckland
Nicaragua	Linda Clerk	22	Managua
Nigeria	Toyin Raji	22	Kogi
Northern Mariana Islands	Karah Kirschenheiter	18	Saipan
Norway	Lena Sandvik	23	Østfold
Panama	Michele Sage	25	Panama City
Paraguay	Bettina Barboza	19	Asunción
Peru	Paola Dellepiane	18	Lima
Philippines	Joanne Santos	18	Manila
Poland	Magdalena Pecikiewicz	19	Silesia
Portugal	Adriana Iria	19	Faro
Puerto Rico	Desirée Lowry	22	Corozal
Romania	Monika Grosu	20	Bucharest
Russia	Yulia Alekseeva	22	Moscow
Seychelles	Maria Payet	21	Mahé
Singapore	Tun Neesa Abdullah	23	Singapore
Slovakia	Nikoleta Mezsarasova	20	Bratislava
South Africa	Augustine Masilela	26	Johannesburg
South Korea	Han Sung-joo	20	Seoul
Spain	María Reyes	18	Soria
Sri Lanka	Shivani Vasagam	24	Colombo
Sweden	Petra Hultgren	23	Stockholm
Switzerland	Sarah Briguet	24	Geneva
Taiwan	Liao Chia-Yi	18	Taipei
Thailand	Phavadee Vichienrat	20	Bangkok
Trinidad and Tobago	Arlene Peterkin	27	Port of Spain
Turkey	Gamze Saygi	21	Istanbul
Turks and Caicos Islands	Sharleen Rochelle Grant	24	Grand Turk
Ukraine	Irina Chernomaz	19	Kharkiv
United States	Chelsi Smith	21	Houston
United States Virgin Islands	Kim Marie Ann Boschulte	24	Saint Thomas
Uruguay	Sandra Znidaric	22	Montevideo
Venezuela	Denyse Floreano	18	Ciudad Ojeda
Zambia	Luo Trica Punabantu	19	Lusaka
