= Monica Brodd =

Swedish beauty pageant contestant (born 1973)

Monica Brodd (born 1973) is a Swedish model and beauty pageant titleholder who won Miss Sweden 1992 and represented her country at Miss Universe 1992 where she placed among the Top 10 competitors.
