= List of Miss Universe Malaysia titleholders =

This is a list of women who have won the Miss Malaya, Miss Malaysia and Miss Universe Malaysia beauty pageant.

== Titleholders ==
=== 1964 to present ===
From 1964 on, the winner of Miss Universe Malaysia represent the country at Miss Universe pageant.

- Declared as winner
- Ended as runner-up or top 5/6 qualification
- Ended as one of the finalists or semifinalists
- Ended as special awards winner

Year	State	Miss Universe Malaysia	Placement at Miss Universe	Special awards
2026	Johor	Eunice Wong	Did not compete	
2025	Kuala Lumpur	Chloe Lim Sue Lyn	Unplaced	
2024	Selangor	Sandra Lim Shue Hui	Top 30	
2023	Kuala Lumpur	Serena Siew Mun Lee	Unplaced	
2022	Selangor	Lesley Cheam Wei Yeng	Unplaced	
2021	Did not compete			
2020	Sarawak	Francisca Luhong James	Unplaced	
2019	Kuala Lumpur	Shwetajeet Kaur Sekhon	Unplaced	
2018	Penang	Jane Teoh Jun	Unplaced	
2017	Kuala Lumpur	Samantha Katie James	Unplaced	
2016	Selangor	Kiranmeet Kaur Jassal	Unplaced	
2015	Negeri Sembilan	Vanessa Tevi Kumares	Unplaced	
2014	Perak	Sabrina Beneett	Unplaced	
2013	Putrajaya	Carey Ng Sue Mun	Unplaced	
2012	Penang	Kimberley Ann Estrop-Leggett	Unplaced	
2011	Kuala Lumpur	Deborah Priya Henry	Unplaced	
2010	Selangor	Nadine Ann Thomas	Unplaced	
2009	Sabah	Joannabelle Ng Li Vun	Unplaced	
2008	Terengganu	Levi Li Su Lin	Unplaced	
2007	Sarawak	Adelaine Chin Ai Nee	Unplaced	
2006	Malacca	Melissa Ann Tan Swee Yen	Unplaced	
2005	Sabah	Angela Gan Hui Boon	Unplaced	
2004	Penang	Andrea Veronica Fonseka	Unplaced	
2003	Kuala Lumpur	Elaine Daly	Unplaced	
2002	Sarawak	Karen Lit Eit Ang	Unplaced	
2001	Pahang	Michelle Tung Mei Chin	Unplaced	
2000	Sarawak	Lynette Mei-Ling Ludi	Unplaced	
1999	Sarawak	Jeanette Ooi Phaik Kween	Unplaced	
1998	Kuala Lumpur	Sherine Wong Sook Ling	Unplaced	
1997	Penang	Trincy Low Ee Bing	Unplaced	
1996	Johor	Adeline Ong Siew Fong	Unplaced	
1995	Selangor	Suziela Azrai	Unplaced	
1994	Sarawak	Liza Koh	Unplaced	
1993	Selangor	Lucy Narayanasamy	Unplaced	
1992	Kuala Lumpur	Crystal Yong	Unplaced	
1991	Perak	Elaine Chew	Unplaced	
1990	Perak	Anna Lin Mei Yoke	Unplaced	
1989	Selangor	Carmen Cheah Swee	Unplaced	
1988	Johor	Linda Lum Chee Ling	Unplaced	
1987	Sabah	Christine Praglar	Unplaced	
1986	Sabah	Betty Chee Nyuk Pit	Unplaced	
1985	Pahang	Agnes Chin Lai Hong	Unplaced	
1984	Selangor	Latifah Abdul Hamid	Unplaced	
1983	Kedah	Puspa Mohamad Salleh	Unplaced	
1982	Kuala Lumpur	Siti Rohani Wahid	Unplaced	
1981	Kuala Lumpur	Audrey Loh Yin Fong	Unplaced	
1980	Pahang	Felicia Yong Lee Lin	Unplaced	
1979	Pahang	Irene Wong Sun Ching	Unplaced	
1978	Kuala Lumpur	Yasmin Yusuff	Unplaced	Best National Costume (2nd runner-up)
1977	Pahang	Leong Li Ping	Unplaced	
1976	Perak	Teh Faridah Ahmad Norizan	Unplaced	
1975	Perak	Alice Cheong Yee Leng	Unplaced	
1974	Johor	Lily Chong Swee Lian	Unplaced	
1973	Selangor	Margaret Loo Tai-Tai	Unplaced	
1972	Johor	Helen Looi	Unplaced	
1971	Terengganu	Yvette Maria Bateman	Unplaced	
1970	Perak	Josephine Lena Wong	Top 15	Queen of Expo; Best in Swimsuit (Top 10)
1969	Penang	Sabrina Loo (Note: Dethroned due to unwilling to represent Malaysia at Miss Universe. Her first runner-up, Rosemary Wan of Selangor took over the crown and title.)	Did not compete	
1969	Selangor	Rosemary Wan Chow Mei	Unplaced	
1968	Johor	Maznah Mohamed Ali	Unplaced	
1967	Kedah	Monkam Siprasome (Note: She was also known by her other name "Ann/Anne Low".)	Unplaced	
1966	Perak	Helen Lee Siew Lien	Unplaced	
1965	Penang	Patricia Augustus	Unplaced	
1964	Selangor	Angela Filmer	Unplaced	

=== 1949 to 1963 ===
Miss Malaysia titleholders from 1949 to 1963 include:

Year	State	Miss Malaya	Placement at Miss Universe	Special awards
1963	Kelantan	Nik Azizah Nik Yahya	Did not compete	
1962	Singapore	Sarah Al Habshee Abdullah	Unplaced	
1955	Unknown	Unknown	Did not compete	
1954	Singapore	Marjorie Wee	Debut as Miss Singapore	
1953	Singapore	Violet Maria Sleigh	Did not compete	
1952	Selangor	Zainon Mohammed	Did not compete	
1951	Kuala Lumpur	Colleen Cooke	No pageant	
1949	Kuala Lumpur	Joan May Darby	No pageant	

== List of Runners-up and finalists ==
Edition	Winner (1st Place)	1st Runner–Up (2nd Place)	2nd Runner–Up (3rd Place)	3rd Runner–Up (4th Place)	4th Runner–Up (5th Place)
1949	Joan Darby; Kuala Lumpur	Babsy Nariman; Burma/Singapore	Margaret Potter; Kuala Lumpur	Not awarded from 1949 until 1973	
1951	Colleen Cooke; Kuala Lumpur	Queenie Hatelie; Penang	Maria; Singapore	Not awarded from 1949 until 1973	
1953	Violet Sleigh; Kuala Lumpur	Adeda Al-Johary; Singapore	Jill Wilkinson; Penang	Not awarded from 1949 until 1973	
1954	Marjorie Wee; Singapore	Violet Sleigh; Kuala Lumpur	Rugayah Ibrahim; Singapore	Not awarded from 1949 until 1973	
1964	Angela Filmer; Selangor	Vera Wee; Singapore	Leonie Foo; Perak	Not awarded from 1949 until 1973	
1965	Patricia Augustus; Penang	Alice Woon; Singapore	Clara de Run; Selangor	Not awarded from 1949 until 1973	
1966	Helen Lee; Perak	Betty Lim; Kuala Lumpur	Ho Lee; Kuala Lumpur	Not awarded from 1949 until 1973	
1967	Monkam Siprasome; Kedah	Maznah Mohamed Ali; Johor	Ramlah Alang; Terengganu	Not awarded from 1949 until 1973	
1969	Sabrina Loo; Penang	Rosemary Wan; Selangor	Sandra Van Geyzel; Negeri Sembilan	Not awarded from 1949 until 1973	
1970	Josephine Lena Wong; Perak	Linda Soo; Penang	Mary Ann Wong; Pahang	Not awarded from 1949 until 1973	
1971	Yvette Bateman; Terengganu	Zuraidah Ismail; Pahang	Jenny Ng; Johor	Not awarded from 1949 until 1973	
1973	Margaret Loo; Selangor	Evelyn Thum; Penang	Marleng Shawn; Sarawak	Not awarded from 1949 until 1973	
1974	Lily Chong; Johor	Linda Kaur; Selangor	Rosalinda Ahmad; Terengganu	Jan Khan; Perak	Susanna Jipanis; Sabah
1975	Alice Cheong; Perak	Sabrina Husseini; Penang	Janet Yee; Selangor	Gracie Veronica Giekie; Sarawak	Jamaliah Ahmad; Terengganu
1976	Faridah Norizan; Perak	Maria Low; Johor	Noraine Ahmad	Not awarded	
1978	Yasmin Yusoff; Kuala Lumpur	Nancie Foo; Selangor	Leona Anne Pinto; Sarawak	Ngafimah Osir; Sabah	Risia Ali Omar; Sabah
1979	Irene Wong; Pahang	Debbie Oh; Sarawak	Saharah Abu Bakar; Kelantan	Janet Poon; Kedah	Annie Chin; Selangor
1988	Linda Lum; Johor	Amy Quek; Sarawak	Jennifer Chong; Negeri Sembilan	Not awarded	
1989	Carmen Cheah; Selangor	Christine Tan; Penang	Evrill June; Sabah	Bernaddine Ooi; Penang	Jean Chia; Sarawak
1997	Trincy Low; Penang	Ooi Bee Bee	Kathleen Cyril	Not awarded	
2000	Lynette Ludi; Sarawak	Alda Stannis Kasun; Sabah	Surita Lim; Kuala Lumpur	Jcqlyne Chin	Unknown
2002	Karen Ang; Sarawak	Christina Chelliah; Kuala Lumpur	Unknown		
2003	Elaine Daly; Kuala Lumpur	Andrea Ho; Penang	Rane Tey; Johor	A. Thanusia; Penang	Jacqueline How; Kuala Lumpur
2004	Andrea Fonseka; Penang	Pushpa Narayan; Pahang	Estelle Looi; Penang	Not awarded from 2004 until 2010	
2005	Angela Gan; Sabah	Chloe Chan; Perak	Chermaine Poo; Kuala Lumpur	Not awarded from 2004 until 2010	
2006	Melissa Ann Tan; Malacca	Rehka Athmalingam; Perak	Daphne Chan; Johor	Not awarded from 2004 until 2010	
2007	Adelaine Chin; Sarawak	Goh Nai Hsing; Kuala Lumpur	Sue Ann Cheng; Sarawak	Not awarded from 2004 until 2010	
2008	Levy Li; Terengganu	Jean Thor Nee; Kuala Lumpur	Valerie Chan; Sarawak	Not awarded from 2004 until 2010	
2009	Joannabelle Ng; Sabah	Cassandra Patrick; Kuala Lumpur	Claudia Tania Sibert; Sarawak	Not awarded from 2004 until 2010	
2010	Nadine Ann Thomas; Selangor	Mourhna Reddy; Kuala Lumpur	Vera Hui; Johor	Not awarded from 2004 until 2010	
2012	Kimberley Leggett; Penang	Gabriella Robinson; Kuala Lumpur	Boon Lu Xanne; Selangor	Juanita Ramayah; Selangor	Not awarded from 2012 until 2013
2013	Carey Ng; Putrajaya	Natalia Ng; Selangor	May Salitah Naru Kiob; Sabah	Symren Kaur; Kuala Lumpur	Not awarded from 2012 until 2013
2014	Sabrina Beneett; Perak	Lalitha Ramesh; Sabah	Kausalya Ida; Sarawak	Lyn Lim; Penang	Karina Grewal; Selangor
2015	Vanessa Tevi Kumares; Negeri Sembilan	Pauline Tan; Selangor	Kelly Jagan; Sabah	Sugeeta Chandran; Selangor	Not awarded
2016	Kiran Jassal; Selangor	Dhivya Dhyana Suppiah; Kuala Lumpur	Lina Soong; Negeri Sembilan	Swarna Naidu; Penang	Nisha Sema; Penang
2017	Samantha James; Kuala Lumpur	Dana Low; Selangor	Ollemadthee Kunasagaran; Penang	Laura Simon; Sabah	Not awarded from 2017 until 2020
2018	Jane Teoh; Penang	Alexis Sue-Ann Seow; Selangor	Liliana Fernandez; Kuala Lumpur	Jasebel Robert; Kuala Lumpur	Not awarded from 2017 until 2020
2019	Shweta Sekhon; Kuala Lumpur	Frost Yaw; Johor	Tessmin Kaur; Selangor	Su Lee; Kuala Lumpur	Not awarded from 2017 until 2020
2020	Francisca Luhong James; Sarawak	Charissa Chong; Selangor	Serene Chai; Johor	Neha Verma; Kuala Lumpur	Not awarded from 2017 until 2020
2022	Cheam Wei Yeng; Selangor	Ajunee Kaur; Kuala Lumpur	Tee Wan Ying; Pahang	Not awarded	
2023	Serena Lee; Kuala Lumpur	Caroline Green; Sarawak	Temara Nelia Inigo; Selangor	Not awarded	
2024	Sandra Lim; Selangor	Gianna Tan; Selangor	Temara Nelia Inigo; Selangor	Not awarded	
2025	Chloe Lim; Kuala Lumpur	Priyaa Simmi; Kuala Lumpur	Jenli Lee; Kuala Lumpur	Not awarded	

== Franchise ==
=== National Directors ===
1. Jaycee Liu Chang Lan (1962–1980)
2. Unknown (1981–2009)
3. Andrea Fonseka (2010–2013)
4. Carey Ng (2014–2016)
5. Elaine Daly (2013, 2016–2022)
6. Poppy Capella Swastika (2023)
7. Eleen Yong (2024)
8. Charissa Chong (2025)
9. Ayu Omar (2026–present) as President & National Director

=== Franchise holders ===
1. Rotary Club Kuala Lumpur (1952–1959)
2. Junior Chamber of Malaya (1960–1963)
3. PJ and Jaycees Kuala Lumpur (1964–1968)
4. Far East Beauty Congress (1969–1974)
5. Miss Orient Sdn. Bhd. (1975–1980)
6. Pageant Promotions Pte. Ltd. (1981–2008)
7. Beyond Entity Sdn. Bhd. (2009–2022; 2024)
8. Just Capella Sdn. Bhd. (2023)
9. Miss Grand International Public Company Limited (2026–present)

=== Name changes ===
1. Miss Malaya (1962–1963)
2. Miss Malaysia (1964–1969)
3. Miss Malaysia Universe (1970–2009)
4. Miss Universe Malaysia (2010–present)
