= Kerry Anne Wells =

Australian beauty queen and new anchor

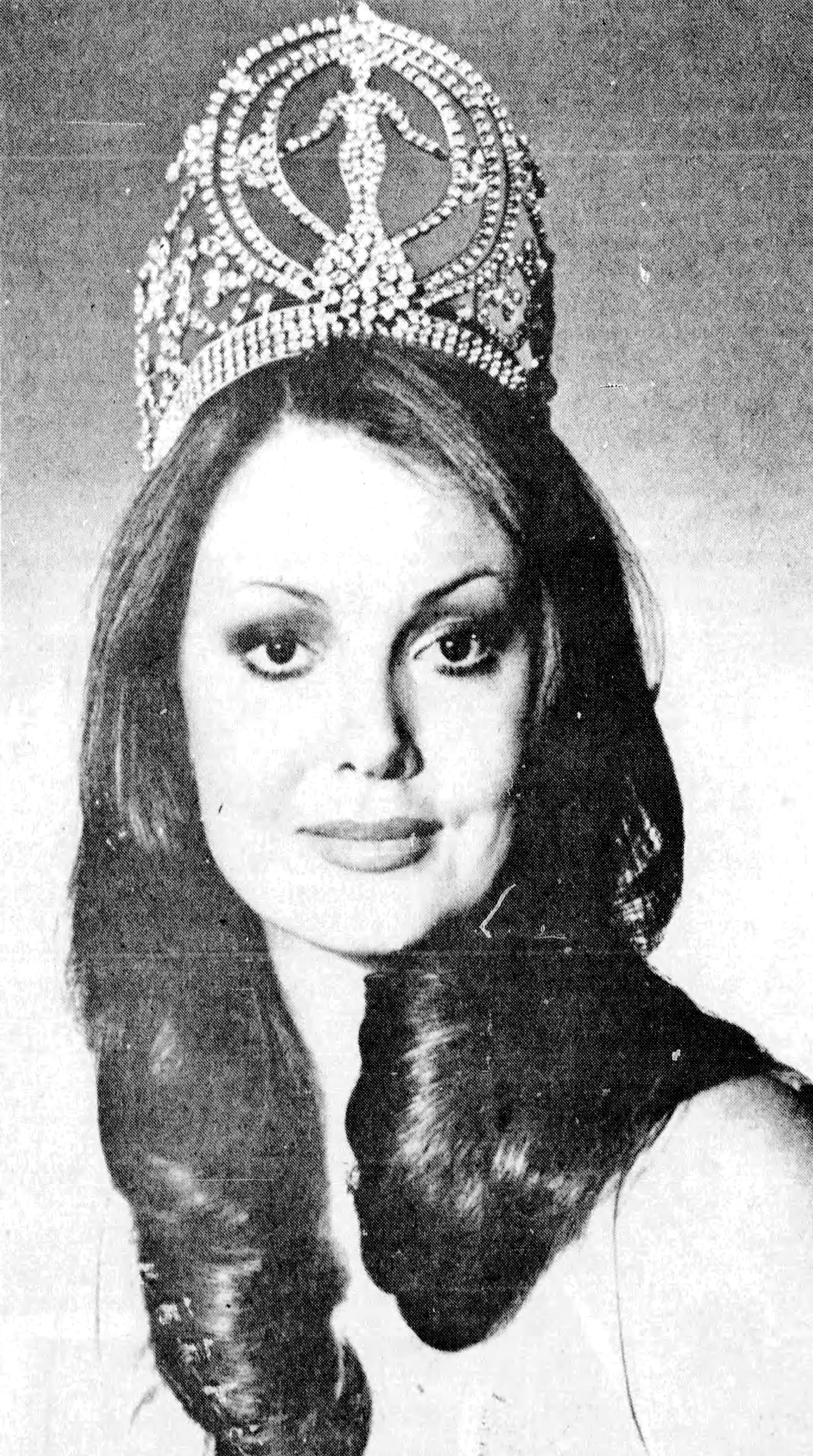
- Wells as the 21st Miss Universe
- Born: Kerry Anne Wells; 25 September 1951 (age 75); Perth, Western Australia, Australia
- Height: 5 ft 11 in (1.80 m)
- Beauty pageant titleholder
- Title: Miss Universe Australia 1972; Miss Universe 1972
- Hair color: Brown
- Eye color: Blue
- Major competitions: Miss Universe Australia 1972 (Winner); Miss Universe 1972 (Winner)

Kerry Anne Wells (born 25 September 1951 in Perth) is an Australian fashion designer, writer, commentator, news anchor and beauty queen who was crowned Miss Universe 1972.

The 1972 pageant was the first to take place outside the continental United States. That year, it was held in Dorado, Puerto Rico. Wells was not crowned by her predecessor, Georgina Rizk because Rizk was not able to travel to Puerto Rico due to government restrictions because of fears of a terrorist attacks after a group of Japanese hired by Arab terrorists, attacked the international airport in Tel Aviv and killed twenty-two Puerto Rican tourists. For that reason Wells was crowned by Miss Universe 1970, Marisol Malaret of Puerto Rico.

Her crowning moment was not shown on television because of a strike threat among pageant electricians. The screen blacked out as her name was announced as the new Miss Universe.

Wells was selected to crown the winner of Miss Universe 1975, due to the suspension of duties by reigning titleholder at the time, Amparo Munoz.

After her reign, she pursued working as a news anchor. Prior to entering the pageants, she worked as a weather girl.

Wells's Miss Universe victory came in a year that Australian women also won the Miss World crown, the Miss Asia Pacific title, and placed second in Miss International. This record was broken by India in the year 2000 where 4 beauty queens, Lara Dutta, Priyanka Chopra, Dia Mirza and Aditi Gowitrikar won Miss Universe, Miss World, Miss Asia Pacific and Mrs. World titles respectively.

As of 2007, Kerry Anne Wells is a successful fashion designer, writer and commentator who speaks out about positive body image and self-esteem. She is involved with BodyThink, a lifestyle program designed for Australian schools.

Awards and achievements
Preceded by (Lebanon) Georgina Rizk	Miss Universe; 1972	Succeeded by (Philippines) Margie Moran
Preceded by (New South Wales) Suzanne Rayward	Miss Australia; 1972	Succeeded by (Queensland) Susan Mainwaring
