= Miss Suriname =

Beauty pageant

Tropical Beauties Suriname Foundation
- Formation: 1951
- Type: Beauty pageant
- Headquarters: Paramaribo
- Location: Suriname
- Members: Miss Universe
- Official language: Dutch
- President: Jermain Tjin-A-Koeng
- Staff: Chilton Sampono
- Website: misstropicalbeauties.org

Miss Suriname is a national Beauty pageant in Suriname. The pageant is now under Tropical Beauties Suriname Foundation which selected the titleholders to Miss World, Miss Universe, Miss International, Miss Earth, Miss Supranational and Mister Supranational.

== History ==
Miss Suriname was held in 1951 for first time. The pageant was run by Lions International Organization until 1999. Since 1958 the winner of Miss Suriname represents her country at the Miss Universe or sometimes Miss World. On occasion, when the winner does not qualify (due to age) for either contest, a runner-up is sent. In 1999 is the last participation of Suriname at the Miss Universe before the local pageant absent to held the contest. In 2007 after returning in new concept, Miss Suriname run by A.P.R.A (Angel's Public Relations & Administration) and decided to send its winner to Miss World.

=== 2007-2012 ===
After a long period of inactivity regarding The National Pageant, The Miss Suriname Pageant began in 2007 by A.P.R.A. (Angel's Public Relations & Administration). In addition in 2007 Miss Suriname collaborated to Miss Suriname, Little Miss Suriname and Miss Teen Model Suriname. The pageant is being national franchise holder for Miss World and Miss Earth until 2008 and Miss International until 2012.

=== 2011-Present ===
In 2011 Miss Suriname divided to two contests which are Miss Suriname by A.P.R.A and Miss Tropical Beauties Suriname. Both of pageants have different purposes. Miss Tropical Beauties Suriname comes to promote the culture of Suriname and the winner will become a goodwill ambassador of her country. The pageant is also becoming national franchise for Miss Earth, Miss International, Miss Supranational and Miss Grand International.

== International winners ==
- Miss West Indies
  - 1955 — Greta Nahar

== Galleries ==
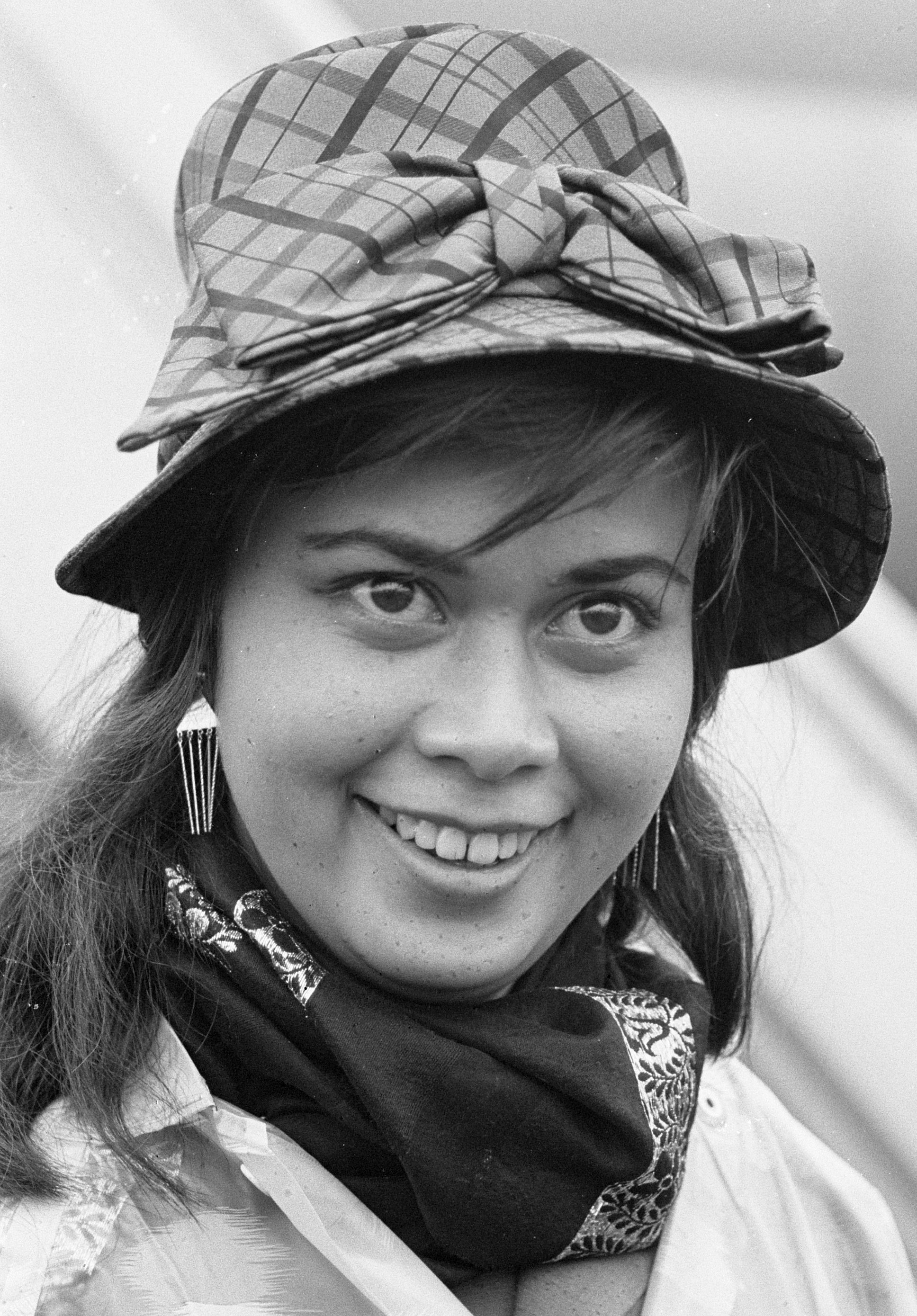
Miss World Suriname 1963, Virginia Blanche Hardjo

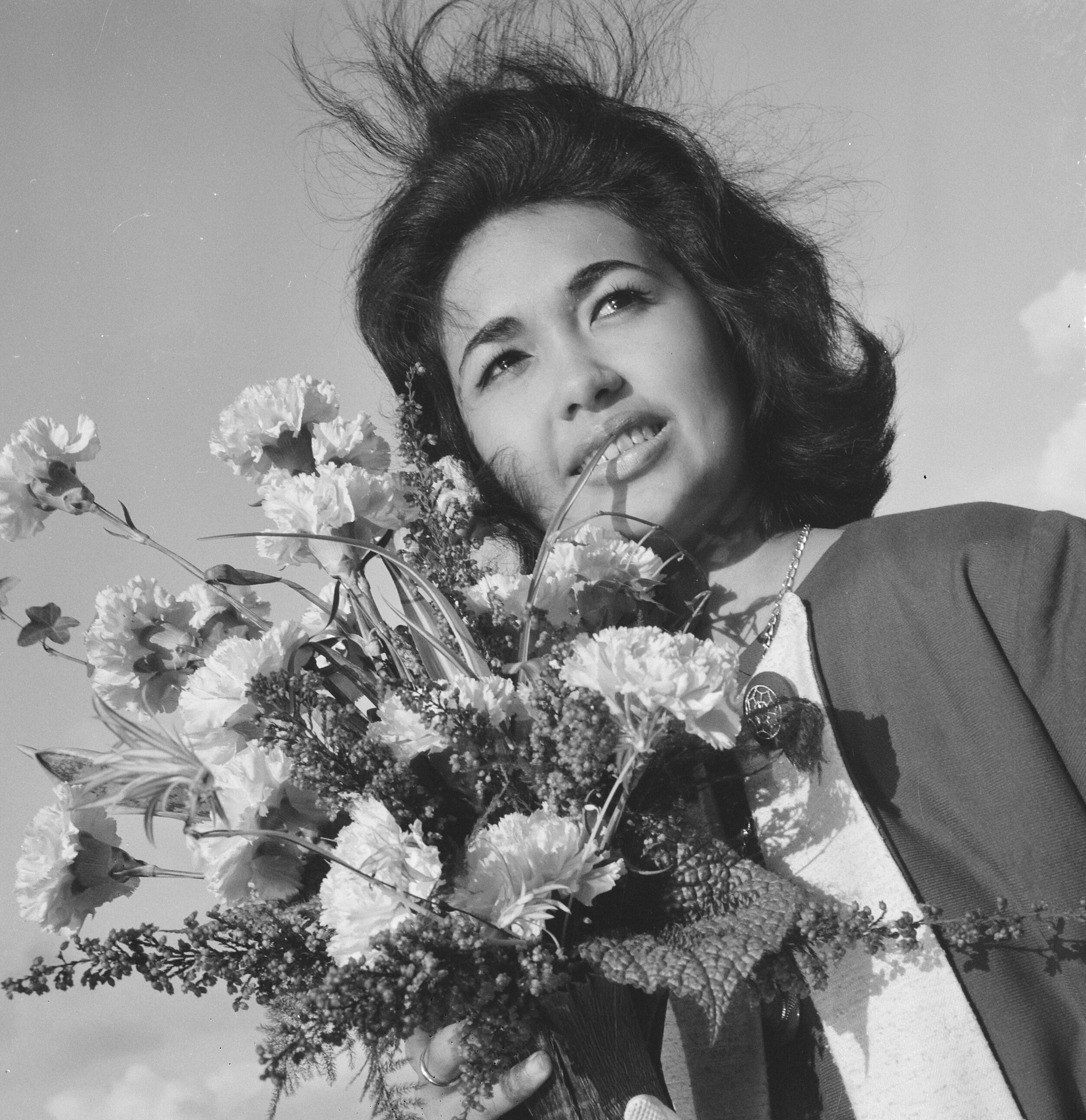
Miss World Suriname 1964, Norma Dorothy (Chin Ten Foen)

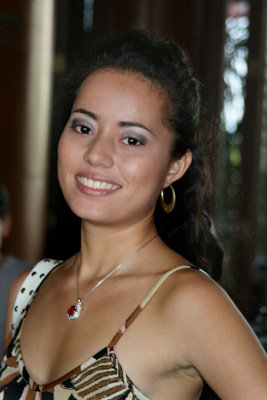
Miss World Suriname 2007, Charisse Moll

== Titleholders ==
Winner International Title
Miss Universe Suriname
Miss World Suriname
Miss International Suriname
Miss Earth Suriname
Miss Supranational Suriname
Miss Grand International Suriname
Mister Supranational Suriname

The winners of Miss Suriname represented the country at Miss Universe pageant. In 1959, 1965 and 1981 Alita Visser, Anita van Eyck and Joan Boldewijn withdrew at Miss Universe, due to unknown reasons. Gertrud Gummels is the only Miss Suriname who placed in the Top 15. Ingrid Mamadeus made a debut at the Miss International 1971 competition.

Year	Miss Suriname	Miss Tropical Beauties Suriname	Mister Suriname
1951	Olga Tjon En Fa	Debuted 2011	Debuted 2016
1955	Greta Nahar; Miss West Indies 1955	Debuted 2011	Debuted 2016
1956	Detta van Brussel	Debuted 2011	Debuted 2016
1958	Gertrud Gummels	Debuted 2011	Debuted 2016
1959	Alita Visser	Debuted 2011	Debuted 2016
1960	Christine Jie Sam Foek	Debuted 2011	Debuted 2016
1961	Kitty Essed	Debuted 2011	Debuted 2016
1963	Brigitta Hougen	Debuted 2011	Debuted 2016
1964	Cynthia Ingrid Dijkstra	Debuted 2011	Debuted 2016
1965	Anita van Eyck	Debuted 2011	Debuted 2016
1966	Joyce Magda Leysner	Debuted 2011	Debuted 2016
1969	Greta Natsir	Debuted 2011	Debuted 2016
1970	Ingrid Mamadeus	Debuted 2011	Debuted 2016
1971	Marita Martowirono	Debuted 2011	Debuted 2016
1972	Carmen Cerna Muntslag	Debuted 2011	Debuted 2016
1973	Yvonne Ma Ajong	Debuted 2011	Debuted 2016
1974	Bernadette Werners	Debuted 2011	Debuted 2016
1975	Mavis Slengard	Debuted 2011	Debuted 2016
1976	Peggy Van der Leuv	Debuted 2011	Debuted 2016
1977	Marlene Roesmienten Saimo	Debuted 2011	Debuted 2016
1978	Garance Harriette Rustwijk	Debuted 2011	Debuted 2016
1979	Sergine Lieuw-A-Len	Debuted 2011	Debuted 2016
1981	Joan Boldewijn	Debuted 2011	Debuted 2016
1982	Vanessa de Vries	Debuted 2011	Debuted 2016
1989	Consuela Cruden	Debuted 2011	Debuted 2016
1990	Saskia Sibilo	Debuted 2011	Debuted 2016
1991	Simone Vos	Debuted 2011	Debuted 2016
1992	Nancy Kasangaloewar	Debuted 2011	Debuted 2016
1993	Jean Zhang	Debuted 2011	Debuted 2016
1999	Serafiya Niekoop	Debuted 2011	Debuted 2016
2007	Safyra Rachida Duurham	Debuted 2011	Debuted 2016
2008	Mireille Nederbiel	Debuted 2011	Debuted 2016
2009	Zoureena Rijger	Debuted 2011	Debuted 2016
2010	Jo-Ann Damien Sang	Debuted 2011	Debuted 2016
2011	x	Sharifa Henar	Debuted 2016
2012	Stefanie Grace Gentle	Periskia Laing	Debuted 2016
2013	x	Jaleeza Weibolt	Debuted 2016
2014	Aiapra With	Tashana Lösche	Debuted 2016
2015	x	Nicole Shelley Tsai-A-Woen	Debuted 2016
2016	x	Jaleesa Pigot	Roché Raoul Kioe-A-Sen
2017	x	Andreza Santos	Arthur Nóbrega
2018	x	Sri-Dewi Martomamat	Angelo Wijngaarde
2019	x	Farisha Tjin Asjoe	Glaucio Stekkel
2023	x	Pooja Chotkan	Irvaan Gajadhar
2024	x	x	x
2025	Chiara Wijntuin	x	x
2026	Eunike Kishundat Lioe-A-Joe	x	x

== Current Franchises ==
=== Miss Universe Suriname ===
- : Declared as Winner
- : Ended as runner-up or top 5/6 qualification
- : Ended as one of the finalists or semifinalists
- : Ended as special awards winner

Year	Miss Suriname	Placement at Miss Universe	Special Award(s)	Notes
2026	Eunike Lioe			
2025	Chiara Wijntuin	Did not compete		
2024	Pooja Chotkan	Unplaced		
Did not compete between 2000-2023
1999	Serafiya Niekoop	Unplaced		
Did not compete between 1994-1998
1993	Jean Zhang	Unplaced		
1992	Nancy Kasangaloewar	Unplaced		
1991	Simone Vos	Unplaced		
1990	Saskia Sibilo	Unplaced		
1989	Consuela Cruden	Unplaced		
Did not compete between 1983-1988
1982	Vanessa de Vries	Unplaced		
Did not compete between 1980-1981
1979	Sergine Lieuw-A-Len	Unplaced		
1978	Garance Harriette Rustwijk	Unplaced		
1977	Marlene Roesmienten Saimo	Unplaced		
1976	Peggy Vandeleuv	Unplaced		
1975	Did not compete			
1974	Bernadette Werners	Unplaced		
1973	Yvonne Ma Ajong	Unplaced		
1972	Carmen Cerna Muntslag	Unplaced		
1971	Marcelle Darou	Unplaced		
1970	Ingrid Mamadeus	Unplaced		
1969	Greta Natsir	Unplaced		
Did not compete between 1967-1968
1966	Joyce Magda Leysner	Unplaced		
1965	Did not compete			
1964	Cynthia Ingrid Dijkstra	Unplaced		
1963	Brigitta Hougen	Unplaced		
Did not compete between 1961-1962
1960	Christine Jie Sam Foek	Unplaced		
1959	Did not compete			
1958	Gertrud Gummels	Top 15		
