= Miss Universe Malaysia 1970 =

- Date: 29 May 1970
- Venue: Fortuna Hotel, Bukit Bintang, Kuala Lumpur
- Entrants: 13
- Placements: 5
- Returns: Sabah; Sarawak
- Winner: Josephine Lena Wong; Perak

Miss Malaysia 1970, the 5th edition of the Miss Universe Malaysia, was held on 29 May 1970 at Fortuna Hotel, Bukit Bintang, Kuala Lumpur. Josephine Lena Wong of Perak was crowned by the outgoing titleholder, Rosemary Wan of Selangor at the end of the event.

== Results ==
Final Results	Contestants
Miss Malaysia Universe 1970	Perak – Josephine Lena Wong
1st Runner-Up	Penang – Linda Soo
2nd Runner-Up	Pahang – Mary Ann Wong

== Delegates ==
- Johor – Malinda Khor
- Kedah – Mimi Abu Bakar
- Kelantan – Rokiah Abdul Rahman
- Melaka – Vicky Chong
- Negeri Sembilan – Florence Chan
- Pahang – Mary Ann Wong
- Penang – Linda Soo Yoke Lin
- Perak – Josephine Lena Wong
- Perlis – Carolyn Chin
- Sabah – Zowita Sheikh Mustapha
- Sarawak – Salley Lee
- Selangor – Zabedah Yusof
- Trengganu – Nancy Ang
