= Miss Tunisie =

Beauty pageant

Miss Tunisia Organization
- Formation: 1956
- Type: Beauty pageant
- Headquarters: Tunis
- Location: Tunisia
- Members: Miss World; Miss International
- Official language: Arabic
- President: Aida Antar
- Website: misstunisie.org

Miss Tunisie or Miss Tunisia is a national Beauty pageant in Tunisia. The pageant produced titleholders of Tunisia at Miss World and Miss International.

== History ==
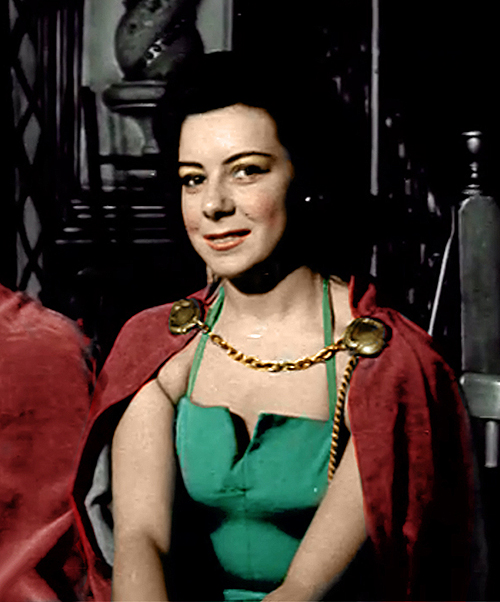
Pascaline Agnes became the first woman from Tunisia to participate in Miss World 1956

Miss Tunisie was held for first time in 1956. The pageant became the national franchise of Miss World in 1956–present, Miss Universe in 1960 - 1971, and Miss International in 1960–present. In 1996, President of Association TEJ - Aida Antar revived the defunct Miss Tunisie contest and is now the official trademark owner.

In 2013, Association TEJ declared to return at Miss World pageant for the first time since 1978. The pageant was held in Jakarta, Indonesia where for the first time the pageant did not allow the bikini session for only that year.

== Titleholders ==
Year	Miss Tunisie
1935	Georgette Temmos
1936	Ethel Azzopardi
1956	Daniele Boublil
1957	Jacqueline Tapia
1958	Denise Orlando
1959	Habiba Bent Abdallah
1960	Marie-Louise Carrigues
1963	Claudine Younes
1964	Dolly Allouche
1965	Zeineb Bent Lamine
1967	Rekaia Dekhil
1968	Zohra Boufaden
1969	Zohra Tabania
1970	Aida Mzali
1971	Souad Keneari
1974	Zohra Kehlifi
1975	Monia Dida
1976	Narjess Medelgi
1978	Malek Nemlaghi
1996	Ibticem Lahmar
1998	Najla Kouniali
2000	Leïla Oualha
2002	Amira Thabet
2004	Rym Laalai
2006	Rym Kadri
2008	Khdija Mrabet
2010	Donia Rekik
2013	Hiba Telmoudi
2014	Wahiba Arres
2015	Rawia Djbeli
2016	Meriem Hammami
2017	Emna Abdelhedi
2018	Haifa Ghedir
2019	Sabrine Khalifa Mansour
2022	Nesrine Haffar
2023	Amira Afli
2025	Lamis Redissi

== Titleholders under Miss Tunisia Organization ==
=== Miss Universe Tunisia ===
- : Declared as Winner
- : Ended as runner-up or top 5/6 qualification
- : Ended as one of the finalists or semifinalists
- : Ended as special awards winner

Miss Tunisia winner was usually competing at Miss Universe until 1971.

Year	Miss Universe Tunisie	Placement at Miss Universe	Special Award(s)	Notes
Did not compete between 2011—present
2010	Donia Rekik	Did not compete		Withdrawal — No official confirmation between Miss Universe and Miss Tunisie Organization.
Did not compete between 1973—2009
1972	Souad Keneari	Did not compete		Withdrawal — Keneari did not get permission from the government.
1971	Aida Mzali	Unplaced		
1970	Zohra Tabania	Unplaced		
1969	Zohra Boufaden	Unplaced	Miss Congeniality	
1968	Rekaia Dekhil	Unplaced		
1967	Zeineb Bent Lamine	Did not compete		
1966	Did not compete			
1965	Dolly Allouche	Unplaced		
1964	Claudine Younes	Unplaced		
Did not compete between 1961—1963
1960	Marie-Louise Carrigues	Unplaced		

=== Miss World Tunisia ===
- : Declared as Winner
- : Ended as runner-up or top 5/6 qualification
- : Ended as one of the finalists or semifinalists
- : Ended as special awards winner

Year	Miss World Tunisie	Placement at Miss World	Special Award(s)	Notes
2027	Oumayma Haouet	TBA		
2026	Did Not Compete			
2025	Lamis Redissi	Top 20	Miss World Talent (Top 48)	Miss Tunisia 2025, Lamis Radissi replaced Miss Tunisia 2023, Amira Afli for undisclosed reason
2024	No competition held			
2023	Imen Mehrzi	Top 40	Miss World Talent	
2022	Miss World 2021 was rescheduled to 16 March 2022 due to the COVID-19 pandemic outbreak in Puerto Rico, no edition started in 2022			
2021	Amani Layouni	Unplaced	Miss World Talent (Top 27); Miss World Sport (Top 32)	Appointed — Amani Layouni was appointed by Miss Tunisie org.
2020	Due to the impact of COVID-19 pandemic, no pageant in 2020			
2019	Sabrine Khalifa Mansour	Top 40		
2018	Haifa Ghedir	Did not compete		
2017	Emna Abdelhedi	Unplaced		
2016	Meriem Hammami	Unplaced		
2015	Maroua Heni	Unplaced		
2014	Wahiba Arres	Unplaced		
2013	Heba Talmoudi	Unplaced		
Did not compete between 1979—2012
1978	Malek Nemlaghi	Unplaced		
Did not compete between 1976—1977
1975	Monia Dida	Unplaced		
Did not compete between 1972—1974
1971	Souad Keneari	Unplaced		
1970	Kaltoum Khouildi	Unplaced		
1969	Zohra Tabania	Unplaced		
1968	Zohra Boufaden	Unplaced		
1967	Rekaia Dekhil	Unplaced		
1966	Did not compete			
1965	Zeineb Bent Lamine	Unplaced		
1964	Dolly Allouche	Unplaced		
1963	Claudine Younes	Unplaced		
Did not compete between 1958—1962
1957	Jacqueline Tapia-Boyle	3rd Runner-up		
1956	Pascaline Agnes	Unplaced		

=== Miss International Tunisia ===
- : Declared as Winner
- : Ended as runner-up or top 5/6 qualification
- : Ended as one of the finalists or semifinalists
- : Ended as special awards winner

Miss International Tunisia is usually appointed by the winner or one of the runner-ups in Miss Tunisia pageant.

Year	Miss International Tunisie	Placement at Miss International	Special Award(s)	Notes
Did not compete since 2024—present
2023	Alaa Tabbel	Unplaced		
Did not compete between 2020—2022
2019	Sarra Brahmi	Unplaced		
2018	Dorsaf Zouaghi	Did not compete		
2017	Khaoula Saad Gueye	Unplaced		
2016	Hiba Telmoudi	Unplaced		
2015	Wahiba Arres	Unplaced		
2014	Did not compete			
2013	Sondes Zamouri	Unplaced		
Did not compete between 2005—2012
2004	Rym Laalai	Unplaced		
2003	Amira Thabet	Unplaced		
2002	Nihad El-Abdi	Unplaced		
2001	Leila Oualha	Unplaced		
2000	Ismahene Lahmar	Top 15		
1999	Leïla Bent Abdesalem	Unplaced		
1998	Nejla Kouniali	Top 15		
1997	Hajer Radhouene	Top 15		
1996	Ibticem Lahmar	1st Runner-up		
Did not compete between 1970—1995
1969	Rekaia Dekhil	Unplaced		
Did not compete between 1961—1968
1960	Habiba Bent Abdallah	Unplaced		

=== Miss Earth Tunisia ===
- : Declared as Winner
- : Ended as runner-up or top 5/6 qualification
- : Ended as one of the finalists or semifinalists
- : Ended as special awards winner

Starting in 2022, the title Miss Earth Tunisia is awarded to one of the runner-ups in the Miss Tunisia pageant. In 2022, Imen Mehrzi was selected Miss Earth Tunisia.

Year	Miss International Tunisie	Placement at Miss International	Special Award(s)	Notes
Did not compete since 2024—present
2023	Imen Mehrzi	Did not compete		

=== Miss Grand Tunisia ===
- : Declared as Winner
- : Ended as runner-up or top 5/6 qualification
- : Ended as one of the finalists or semifinalists
- : Ended as special awards winner

In 2015, Arij Nasri, who represented Téboursouk at the Miss Tunisie 2015 pageant and was named the first-vice miss, was appointed Miss Grand Tunisia. Nasri then competed at Miss Grand International 2015, but was unplaced.

Year	Miss Grand Tunisie	Placement at Miss Grand International	Special Award(s)	Notes
2015	Arij Nasri	Unplaced		

== See also ==
- List of beauty contests
