= Claudine Cassereau =

French model and artist (1953–2020)

- Born: 1953; Loudun, France
- Died: 5 August 2020 (aged 66–67); Fréjus, France
- Occupation: Model
- Beauty pageant titleholder
- Title: Miss France 1972
- Major competitions: Miss France 1972 (Winner); Miss Universe 1972 (Unplaced)

Claudine Cassereau (1953 – 5 August 2020) was a French model, artist and beauty pageant titleholder. She was elected Miss Poitou-Charentes in 1971 and was 3rd Runner-Up (4th place) in Miss France in 1972. She then became Miss France 1972 after Chantal Bouvie de Lamotte was hurt by a fall from horseback.

== Biography ==
Cassereau was born in Loudun. She began painting at the age of eight. She was elected Miss Poitou-Charentes 1971 at the age of 18 in Airvault.

Miss France 1972 was held at the Palais des Fêtes in Épernay. Cassereau won the prize of Miss Elegance and was 4th place overall (3rd Runner-Up), but was given the prize following a riding accident by the winner, Chantal Bouvie de Lamotte. She was presented by the French Football Federation during the quarterfinals of the 1971–72 Coupe de France. The Senator from Vienne and the Mayor of Loudun, René Monory held a reception in her honor. She would travel around France and around the world, participating in numerous ceremonies, galas, and on television sets. She notably traveled to New York City where she was received at the United Nations by US President Richard Nixon and accompanied by the French ambassador.

Cassereau represented France on an international level. She finished 6th in the Miss Europe competition on 13 June 1972 in Estoril, Portugal. She participated in the Miss Universe 1972 competition held in Puerto Rico, and Miss World 1972 held in London. She would fulfill her functions as Miss France until the 1973 competition.

After Miss France, Cassereau worked in a restaurant in Tours. She then moved to Cogolin in the 1990s and devoted herself to painting. She mostly painted horses and celebrities, such as Marilyn Monroe, James Dean, Raimu, and Johnny Hallyday.

Some official lists did not show Cassereau as Miss France 1972, so she brought her request to Geneviève de Fontenay, Chair of the Miss France Committee, but her request to be shown on the official list as Miss France 1972 was dismissed in favor of Chantal Bouvie de Lamotte, who had originally won the prize.

Claudine Cassereau died in Fréjus on 5 August 2020 at the age of 66.
