= Walid Toufic =

Lebanese singer (born 1954)

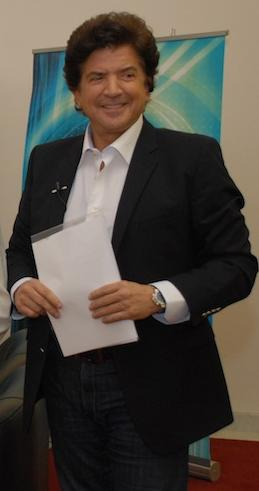
- Toufic in 2010

Background information
- Born: Walid Toutounji; April 8, 1954 (age 72)
- Origin: Tripoli, Lebanon
- Genres: Lebanese, Arabic, pop-folk
- Occupation: Singer
- Years active: 1973–present
- Website: www.walidtoufic.net

Walid Toutounji (Arabic: وليد توتنجي; born April 8, 1954), known as Walid Toufic (وليد توفيق), is a Lebanese singer and actor.

== Biography ==
Walid Toufic, born Walid Toutounji, grew up with his Sunni family in Tripoli, Lebanon. He later relocated to western Beirut and lived in the residential area of Ibn Rashd Street. His first oud tutor was the blind Amin Azar. During this period, Toufic worked to raise enough money for his music lessons.

Toufic became popular and made his big break in Egypt. His acting career began soon afterwards where he starred in movies with various Egyptian and Arab stars in Egyptian cinema, including Farid al-Atrash, Mariam Fakhr Eddine, Madiha Yousri, Samir Ghanem, Laila Elwi, Duraid Lahham, Huda Sultan, Saeed Saleh, Raghda, and Athar El-Hakim, among others.

Toufic had a longstanding collaboration with Egyptian composer Baligh Hamdi. Songs like Ehna El-Tayibin and Sinin Ahbab were met with success. Meeting prominent 20th-century Arab-Egyptian singer and composer Mohammed Abdel Wahab played a substantial part in influencing Toufic.

Toufic's song subjects include love and patriotism of his home country, Lebanon, and the Arab world at large. His popularity in the Arab world has won him the title of The Arab Star given to him by Lebanese journalist George Khoury.

He is married to Georgina Rizk, Miss Universe 1971. They have two children.
