= Amalia Heller =

Venezuelan broadcaster and beauty pageant titleholder

- Born: Amalia del Carmen Heller Gómez; April 13, 1951 (age 74); Caracas, Venezuela
- Height: 1.74 m (5.7 ft)
- Spouse: Leonardo Ron Pedrique
- Children: Salomón Leonardo; Miguel Alejandro

Amalia del Carmen Heller Gómez (born 13 April 1951) is a Venezuelan broadcaster, entertainer and beauty pageant titleholder known for her participation at Miss Venezuela 1972 and represented her country at Miss World 1972.

== Biography ==
Amalia Heller was born on 13 April 1951 in Caracas, Venezuela. She had already won some competitions in the locality of Caracas by the age of six. At the age of 14, she embarked on a cruise on the Caribbean Sea. While on this trip, she met Osmel Sousa at a party she and her brother attended, and Sousa invited Heller to participate in Miss Venezuela. She would, and appeared at Miss Venezuela 1972 representing the State of Sucre and, despite being the most promoted contestant, placed as the first runner-up. That year, she traveled to London to compete in Miss World 1972 on 1 December 1972, in the process rooming with and befriend Lynda Carter (who four years later would play Wonder Woman in the TV series of the same name), but did not place. In 1974, she married Leonardo Ron Pedrique and they had two children, Salomón Leonardo and Miguel Alejandro.

Heller worked as a radio show host on La Nueva Magica 99.1fm and became president of the company until the radio station was shut down by the National Commission of Telecommunications (CONATEL) over political disagreements.

== Citations ==
Preceded by Ana María Padrón	Miss World Venezuela; 1972	Succeeded by Edicta García
