= Miss Universe 1972 =

21st Miss Universe pageant

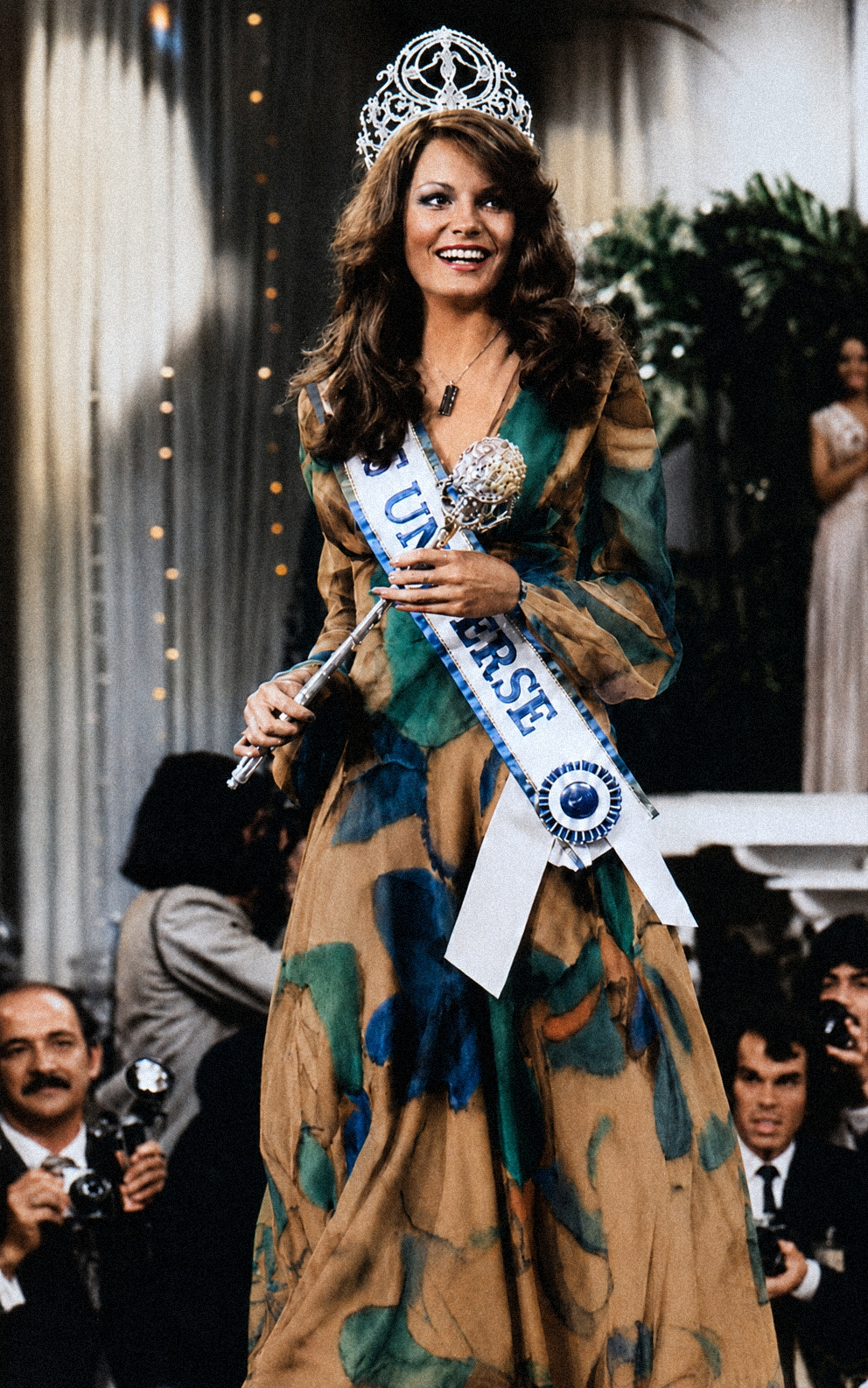
- Kerry Anne Wells
- Date: 29 July 1972
- Presenters: Bob Barker
- Venue: Cerromar Beach Hotel, Dorado, Puerto Rico
- Broadcaster: CBS (international); Telemundo (official broadcaster)
- Entrants: 61
- Placements: 12
- Debuts: Iraq
- Withdrawals: Lebanon; Nicaragua; Panama; Trinidad and Tobago; Tunisia
- Returns: Chile; Denmark; El Salvador; Hong Kong; Paraguay
- Winner: Kerry Anne Wells; Australia
- Congeniality: Ombayi Mukuta (Zaire)
- Best National Costume: Carmen Ampuero (Peru)

Miss Universe 1972 was the 21st Miss Universe pageant, held at the Cerromar Beach Hotel in Dorado, Puerto Rico on 29 July 1972. It was the first edition to be held outside the continental United States.

At the conclusion of the event, Miss Universe 1970, Marisol Malaret, crowned Kerry Anne Wells of Australia as Miss Universe 1972. It is the first victory of Australia in the pageant's history. Miss Universe 1971, Georgina Rizk of Lebanon, was not able to crown her successor due to government restrictions because of fears of a terrorist attack.

Contestants from sixty-one countries and territories participated in this year's pageant. The pageant was hosted by Bob Barker in his sixth consecutive year, while Helen O'Connell provided commentary and analysis throughout the event.

== Background ==
=== Location and date ===
On 3 August 1971, the Miss Universe Organization and the Government Economic Development Administrator of Puerto Rico signed a contract to bring both Miss Universe and Miss USA pageants to San Juan for the next five years. Additionally, instead of Miami, Georgina Rizk, Miss Universe 1971, will reside in the designated territory as per the signed contract. Harold Glasser, president of the Miss Universe Organization, stated that the competition was relocated to Puerto Rico due to the positive impression that Miss Universe 1970, Marisol Malaret, made during her reign.

=== Selection of participants ===
Contestants from sixty-one countries and territories were selected to compete in the pageant. One candidate is appointed to the position after being runner-up in their national pageant.

==== Debuts, returns, and, withdrawals ====
This edition saw the debut of Iraq and the returns of El Salvador, which last competed in 1955; and Chile, Denmark, Hong Kong and Paraguay which last competed in 1970.

Miss Lebanon 1972, Christiane Accaoui, withdrew due to government restrictions because of fears of a terrorist attack. Elicia Irish of Trinidad and Tobago and Souad Keneari of Tunisia withdrew for undisclosed reasons. Nicaragua and Panama withdrew from the competition after their respective organizations failed to hold a national competition or appoint a delegate.

Both Maria Koutrouza of Cyprus and Roya Rouhani Moghaddam of Iran are set to compete this year, but withdrew for undisclosed reasons. Daniela Krajcinovic of Yugoslavia withdrew for health problems.

=== Incidents during the competition ===
During the Miss USA 1972 pageant, two months before the competition, two bombs exploded inside the Cerromar Beach Hotel, damaging four rooms and four cars in the hotel. The explosions were suspected to be the work of activists opposing the United States' rule in Puerto Rico. As a result, security at the Cerromar Beach Hotel has been tightened during the competition. Only individuals with connections to the hotel, the government, and the competition are permitted inside the competition location. If the damage to the competition persists, the competition in Puerto Rico will not proceed.

On 14 July 1972, Salibe Tartak, the Lebanese Consul in San Juan, announced that the Lebanese government had denied permission for Miss Universe 1971, Georgina Rizk, and the Lebanese candidate for Miss Universe 1972, Christiane Accoui, to travel. Rizk stated that she chose not to fly to Puerto Rico due to fears of reprisals related to the Tel Aviv Airport massacre that occurred on 30 May 1972, which resulted in the deaths of sixteen Puerto Ricans. The massacre was carried out by three Japanese men who had been recruited by Palestinian guerrilla groups. According to Tartak, instead of being afraid of the massacre on May 30, Rizk was afraid of possible terrorist activities by terrorist groups on the island at Miss Universe, just like the bombings that occurred during Miss USA 1972.

On the night of the final competition, 400 members of the Puerto Rican Socialist Party gathered to protest along the highway in front of the hotel. The demonstrators chanted, "Working women work, and bourgeois women model." According to Juan Mari Bras, the secretary-general of the Socialist Party, the heavy police presence at the hotel caused a traffic jam on the highway where they were picketing. During the announcement of the winner of the competition, members of the Puerto Rican Socialist Party managed to disconnect the cables of the cameras broadcasting the event. The connection was only restored as Kerry Anne Wells was making her first walk as Miss Universe 1972.

== Results ==
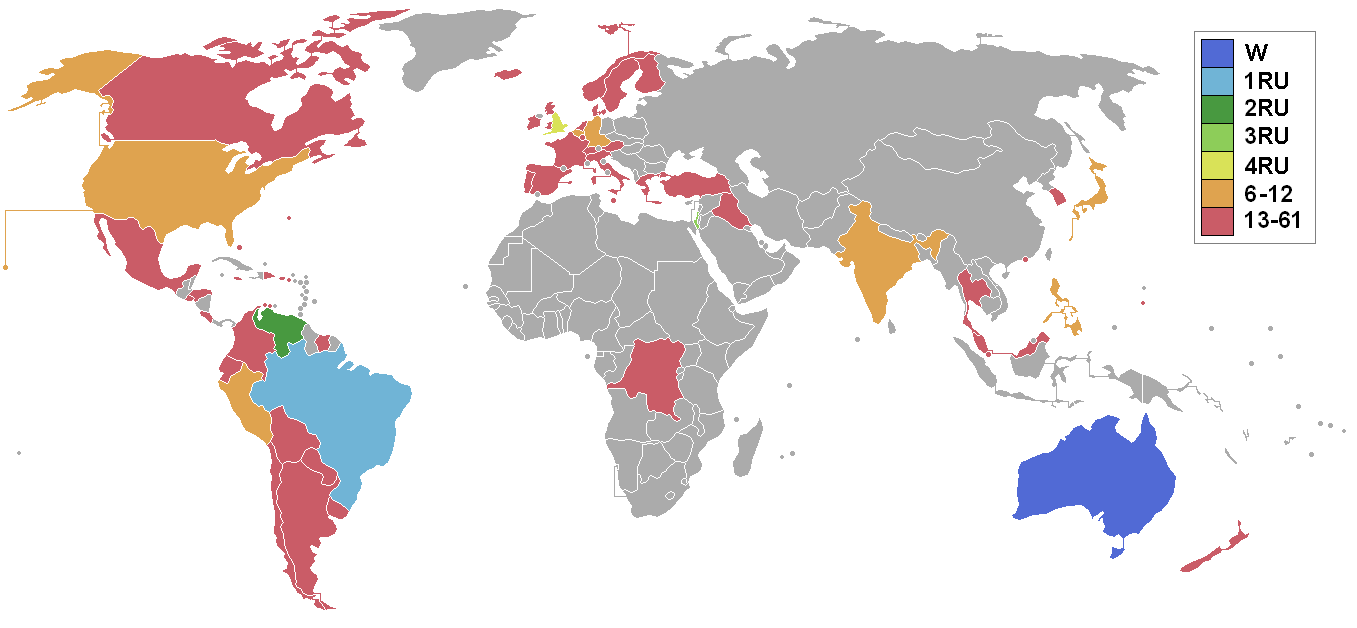
Miss Universe 1972 participating countries and territories.

=== Placements ===
Placement	Contestant
Miss Universe 1972	Australia – Kerry Anne Wells
1st Runner-Up	Brazil – Rejane Costa
2nd Runner-Up	Venezuela – María Antonieta Cámpoli
3rd Runner-Up	Israel – Ilana Goren
4th Runner-Up	England – Jennifer McAdam
Top 12	Belgium – Anne-Marie Roger; India – Roopa Satyan; Japan – Harumi Maeda; Peru – Carmen Amelia Ampuero; Philippines – Armi Barbara Crespo; United States – Tanya Wilson; West Germany – Heidemarie Weber

=== Special awards ===
Award	Contestant
Miss Amity	Zaire – Ombayi Mukuta
Best National Costume	Peru – Carmen Amelia Ampuero

== Pageant ==
=== Format ===
Same with 1971, twelve semi-finalists were chosen at the preliminary competition that consists of the swimsuit and evening gown competition. The twelve semi-finalists participated in the casual interview, swimsuit, and evening gown competitions. From twelve, five finalists were shortlisted to advance to the final interview.

=== Selection committee ===
- Mapita Cortés – Puerto Rican actress
- Kiyoshi Hara – President of the Asahi Broadcasting Corporation in Japan
- Sylvia Hitchcock – Miss Universe 1967 from the United States
- Curt Jurgens – German-Austrian stage and film actor
- Jean-Louis Lindekens – Belgian columnist
- Lynn Redgrave – British-American actress
- Line Renaud – French actress and singer
- Arnold Scaasi – Canadian fashion designer
- Edilson Cid Varela – Brazilian journalist
- Fred Williamson – American actor and former football player
- Earl Wilson – American columnist and journalist

== Contestants ==
Sixty-one contestants competed for the title.

Country/Territory	Contestant	Age (Note: Ages at the time of the pageant)	Hometown
Argentina	Norma Dudik	22	Buenos Aires
(Netherlands Antilles) Aruba	Ivonne Dirksz	18	Oranjestad
Australia	Kerry Anne Wells	20	Perth
Austria	Uschi Pacher	21	Carinthia
(The Bahamas) Bahamas	Deborah Taylor	22	Bimini
Belgium	Anne-Marie Roger	24	Brussels
Bermuda	Helen Brown	18	St. George's
Bolivia	María Alicia Vargas	19	Santa Cruz de la Sierra
Brazil	Rejane Costa	18	Cachoeira do Sul
Canada	Bonny Brady	18	Perth
Chile	Consuelo Fernández	18	Santiago
Colombia	María Luisa Lignarolo	19	Atlántico
Costa Rica	Vicki Ross	22	San José
(Netherlands Antilles) Curaçao	Ingrid Prade	19	Willemstad
Denmark	Marianne Schmidt	18	Copenhagen
Dominican Republic	Ivonne Butler	19	La Romana
Ecuador	Susana Castro	19	Quito
El Salvador	Ruth Eugenia Romero	22	San Salvador
England	Jennifer McAdam	24	London
Finland	Maj-Len Eriksson	19	Helsinki
France	Claudine Cassereau	19	Poitou
Greece	Nansy Kapetanaki	19	Athens
Guam	Patricia Alvarez	18	Yigo
Holland	Jenny Ten Wolde	25	The Hague
Honduras	Doris Alicia Roca	19	Cortés
Hong Kong	Rita Leung	19	Hong Kong
Iceland	María Kristín Jóhannesdóttir	19	Reykjavík
India	Roopa Satyan	18	Bangalore
Iraq	Wijdan Burhan El-Deen Sulyman	18	Baghdad
Ireland	Maree McGlinchey	22	Donegal
Israel	Ilana Goren	19	Kiryat Motzkin
Italy	Isabela Specia	20	Milan
Jamaica	Grace Marilyn Wright	20	Kingston
Japan	Harumi Maeda	21	Tokyo
Luxembourg	Anita Heck	18	Esch-sur-Alzette
Malaysia	Helen Looi	22	Georgetown
Malta	Doris Abdilla	21	Birżebbuġa
Mexico	María del Carmen Orozco	18	Chihuahua
New Zealand	Kristine Allan	19	Auckland
Norway	Liv Olsen	22	Oslo
Paraguay	María Stela Volpe	19	Asunción
Peru	Carmen Ampuero	18	Lima
Philippines	Armi Barbara Crespo	18	Manila
Portugal	Iris dos Santos	18	Portuguese Mozambique
Puerto Rico	Bárbara Torres	18	Santurce
Scotland	Elizabeth Stevely	20	Glasgow
Singapore	Jacqueline Han	21	Singapore
South Korea	Yeon-joo Park	20	Seoul
Spain	María del Carmen Muñoz	18	Madrid
Suriname	Carmen Muntslag	18	Paramaribo
Sweden	Britt Marie Johansson	19	Trångsund
Switzerland	Anneliese Weber	–	Zürich
Thailand	Nipapat Sudsiri	21	Kanchanaburi
Turkey	Neslihan Sunay	18	Eskişehir
United States	Tanya Wilson	22	Honolulu
United States Virgin Islands	Carol Krieger	18	Saint Croix
Uruguay	Christina Moller	20	Montevideo
Venezuela	María Antonieta Cámpoli	18	Nueva Esparta
Wales	Eileen Darroch	21	Caerwys
West Germany	Heidemarie Weber	24	Brandenburg
Zaire	Ombayi Mukuta	18	Kinshasa
