= Georgina Rizk =

Lebanese model

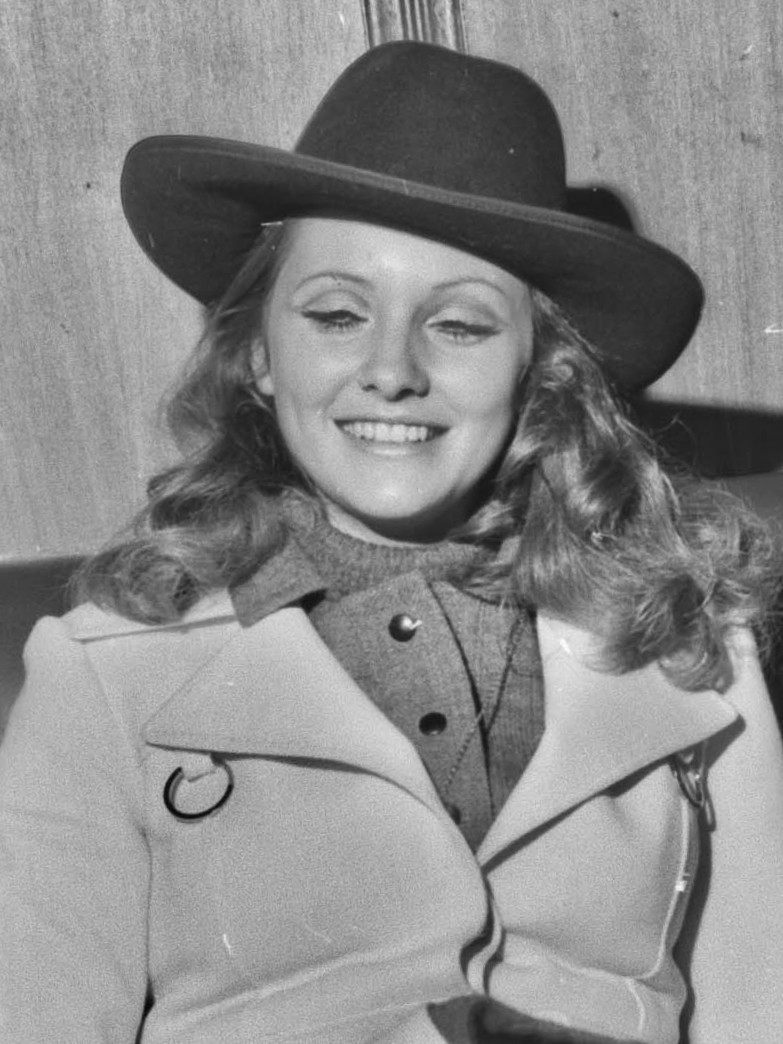
- Rizk in 1971
- Born: 3 January 1953 (age 73); Beirut, Lebanon
- Height: 5 ft 6.5 in (169 cm)
- Spouses: Muharram Fouad (m. 1975; div. 1975) Ali Hassan Salameh (m. 1978; died 1979) Walid Toufic (m. 1990)
- Children: 3
- Beauty pageant titleholder
- Title: Miss Lebanon 1970; Miss Universe 1971
- Hair color: Auburn
- Eye color: Green
- Major competitions: Miss Lebanon 1970 (Winner); Miss World 1970 (Unplaced); Miss Universe 1971 (Winner)

Georgina Rizk (Arabic: جورجينا رزق, romanized: Jūrjīnā Rizq) (born 3 January 1953) is a Lebanese model, socialite, and beauty queen. After being crowned Miss Lebanon 1970, she represented Lebanon at Miss Universe 1971, where she won the title, becoming the first Lebanese and the first Arab woman to do so. She had previously competed at Miss World 1970, where she was unplaced.

In 1971, she began a relationship with Palestinian militant Ali Hassan Salameh that lasted until his assassination by the Mossad in 1979. She currently serves as a judge for the Miss Lebanon contest and is married to Lebanese singer and actor Walid Toufic.

== Biography ==
Rizk was born in Beirut into a Christian household. She was crowned Miss Lebanon in 1970 and represented Lebanon at the Miss World pageant but failed to place. Months later, on 24 July 1971, she represented Lebanon at the Miss Universe pageant and was crowned Miss Universe 1971 in Miami Beach, Florida, United States. She was the first woman from the Middle East, the fourth woman from Asia overall and the first from West Asia to win the title. In the pageant, she made a memorable fashion statement by wearing a very revealing top and hotpants.

The 1972 Miss Universe pageant was held in Cerromar Beach Hotel in Dorado, Puerto Rico. On 30 May 1972, a month before the pageant telecast, 17 Christian pilgrims from Puerto Rico, along with other victims, were killed during an attack at the Lod Airport in Israel (now Ben Gurion International Airport). The massacre was perpetrated by three members of the Japanese Red Army on behalf of the Popular Front for the Liberation of Palestine (PFLP). Due to fear of possible retaliation for the massacre of the Puerto Ricans, Rizk was not allowed to attend the Miss Universe pageant to crown her successor in Puerto Rico.

== Personal life ==
Prior to winning the pageant and at the time of her crowning, she dated a French university chemistry student named Philippe Duc. She stated at a press conference in 1971 that she approved of pre-marital sex, stating "we must have lots of experience" and that "marriage is not a simple thing". Rizk would later claim that her comments were misquoted: what she really meant was that she approved of pre-marital sex but only with someone one loved or planned to marry.

Rizk's first husband was Muharram Fouad, an Egyptian singer and actor whom she married for a short period in 1975. Rizk later married Ali Hassan Salameh, a Palestinian who was chief of operations for Black September and founder of Force 17. The couple spent their honeymoon in Hawaii and then stayed at Disneyland. When Rizk got pregnant, she returned to Beirut. Salameh was killed in 1979 by the Mossad. Salameh, identified as a key participant in the 1972 Munich massacre, was killed as part of Mossad assassinations following the Munich massacre. Rizk was six months pregnant when Salameh was assassinated.

She married Lebanese singer Walid Toufic in 1990. She has two children with him.

She has been a judge for the Miss Lebanon pageants.

Her sister was jailed in Syria for murdering her husband.

Rizk has a Canadian maternal nephew, actor Ty Wood.

== Role in the Arab-Israeli conflict and Lebanese Civil War ==
Even though Rizk was a model who became a popular figure in Lebanon for her achievements, she never had any interest or aspirations to be involved in politics. However, Rizk was often involuntarily drawn into the regional conflict. This was largely due to the current political events at the time, with her country Lebanon caught up in the Arab-Israeli conflict and strategically positioned near the heart of the conflict.

At Miss Universe 1971, in Miami, Florida, she was reportedly on friendly terms with the Miss Israel contestant Etty Orgad, whom she "met and enjoyed knowing" according to Rizk. She responded to criticism by stating that "this is a beauty contest, not politics" and that the conflict "is the government's worry, not mine."

In 1972, at the Lod Airport Massacre in Israel, 17 Puerto Rican tourists, among others, were murdered by Palestine militant terrorists under the banner of the PLO. As a result, Rizk was forbidden to attend the Miss Universe 1972 in Puerto Rico to crown her successor due to fear of a revenge attack. She stated that she was afraid to attend the beauty pageant for fear of what might happen.

In the Lebanese Civil War in the mid-1970s, she was drawn into the conflict when she began a romantic relationship with Palestinian PLO militant and intelligence official Ali Hassan Salameh, who was nicknamed "The Red Prince" due to his lavish lifestyle, and playboy persona. (Salameh was allegedly still married to his first wife Um Hassan when their affair began). The date on which the couple was married is widely disputed. Yasser Arafat was said to disapprove of their pre-marital relationship because it violated the traditional conservative Arab status quo, and he remained hostile to Rizk due to that.

After her marriage, in keeping with Salameh's traditional Muslim background and conservative Palestinian culture, Rizk quit her modeling and film careers, staying mostly at home. The couple were said to only be known to socialize with fellow wealthy Lebanese and Palestinians.

Awards and achievements
Preceded by Puerto Rico Marisol Malaret	Miss Universe; 1971	Succeeded by Australia Kerry Anne Wells
Preceded by Georgette Gero	Miss Lebanon; 1971	Succeeded by Marcelle Herro
