= Anna Santisteban =

Puerto Rican businesswoman (1914–2003)

- Born: November 3, 1914; Guayama, Puerto Rico
- Died: May 18, 2003 (aged 88); Santurce, Puerto Rico
- Occupations: businesswoman, beauty entrepreneur

Anna Santisteban (November 3, 1914 – May 18, 2003) was a Puerto Rican businesswoman and beauty entrepreneur who presided over the Miss Puerto Rico beauty pageant from 1962 to 1995, or 33 years. Popularly known as the Hacedora de Reinas (Maker of Queens), she was in charge of selecting and preparing the delegate to compete for the title of Miss Universe, as well as other beauty international beauty titles, including Miss World and Miss International. Under her leadership, Puerto Rico won Miss Universe thrice (1970, 1985, and 1995) and Miss International once (1987).

== Career ==
Born in Guayama, Puerto Rico, Santisteban thought to create a modeling agency. Santisteban's finishing school and modeling academy, Polianna, quickly became a landmark for aspiring models in the island during the 1960s. She was famous for referring to her students as "my girls", her personal approach to training making her a mother figure for many runway and TV models at that time.

After the success of her first beauty enterprise, in 1962 Santisteban received an offer to produce the Miss Puerto Rico competition.

Under Santisteban's close supervision, many Miss Puerto Rico titleholders became TV personalities, international models and business leaders. Some of her detractors have said that Santisteban was a strict trainer and an ambitious woman. She neither confirmed nor denied this fact. After Deborah Carthy-Deu won the second Miss Universe title for Puerto Rico in 1985, Puerto Rico scored remarkable positions in both the semifinal and final rounds of this competition.

In 1993, Dayanara Torres became Santisteban's third and last winner for the Miss Universe Pageant. In 1996, when Donald Trump acquired the Miss Universe Organization, Santisteban, the oldest national director at the age of 81, lost the franchise.

== Personal life ==
With first husband Luis Pedreira, Santisteban had three sons, Walter, Luis and Alberto, the youngest, who died in an accident. When Eddie Ortiz, her second husband and business partner, died in 2000, she suffered a fall and was removed from her Art-Deco home in the upmarket San Juan area known as Ocean Park, to a long-term care nursing home named Hogar Santa Teresa de Jornet.

On May 18, 2003, Santisteban died at the Pavía Hospital in Santurce, Puerto Rico after battling a long illness.
