= María Antonieta Cámpoli =

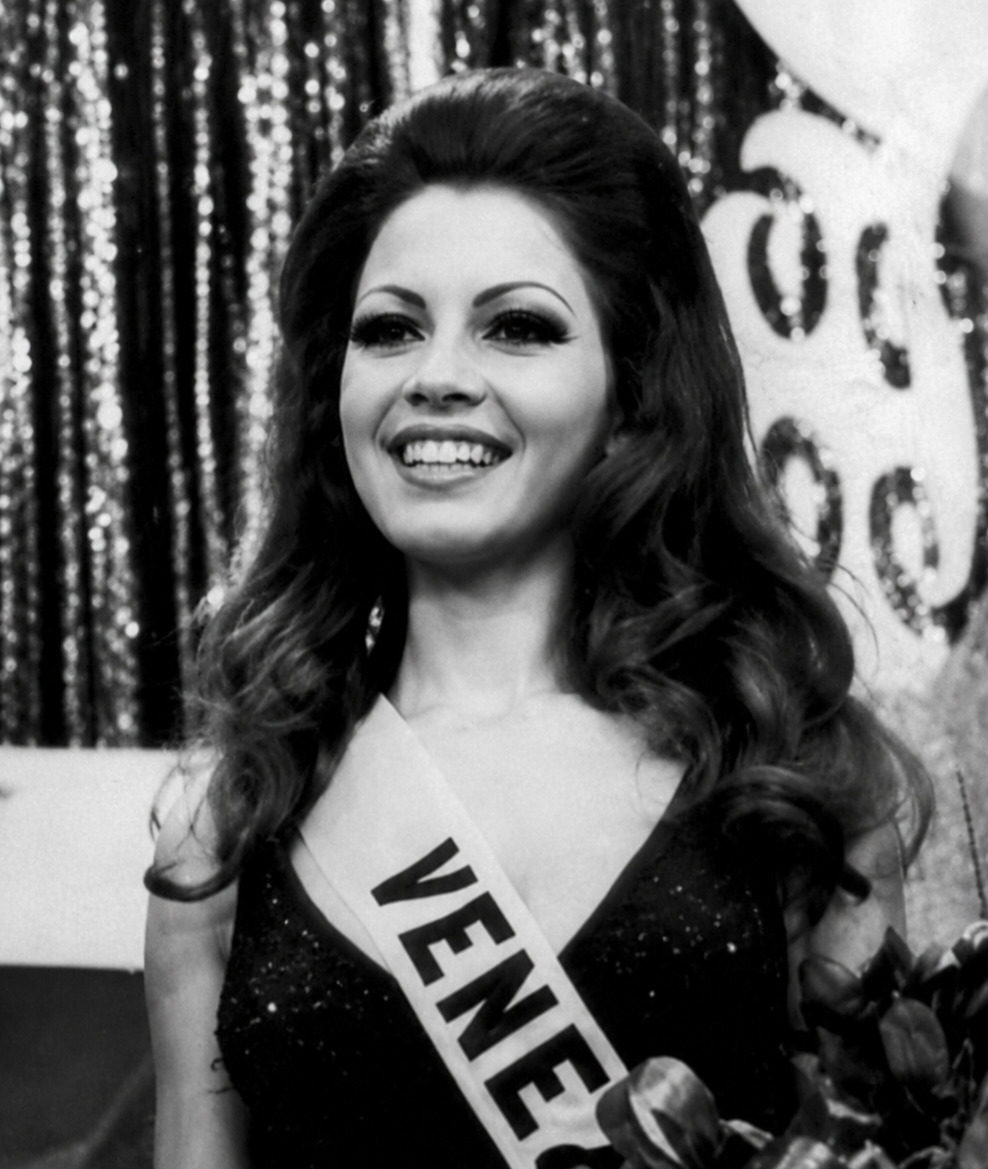
- Born: María Antonieta Cámpoli Prisco; October 9, 1955 (age 70); Isola del Liri, Italy
- Height: 1.72 m (5 ft 8 in)
- Beauty pageant titleholder
- Hair color: Brown
- Eye color: Hazel

María Antonieta Cámpoli Prisco (born October 9, 1955) is an Italian-Venezuelan beauty pageant titleholder who was crowned Miss Venezuela 1972.

== Biography ==
Maria Antonietta Cámpoli was born in Isola del Liri (an ancient city of Latium, located nearly 100 km south of Rome) in 1955. Later, her family moved to live in Caracas, where she grew up. At the age of 17, she was elected Miss Venezuela. But there was a huge scandal when her age was officially known, because by law she was not allowed to participate as she was under 18 years old ("menor de edad") and additionally she was not born in Venezuela. It was President Rafael Caldera who allowed her to maintain the title, arguing even that she was "Venezuelan by birth", because she had moved to Venezuela when she was less than five years old. She later went to Puerto Rico as Miss Venezuela in the Miss Universe of the same year.

She is the Miss Venezuela titleholder for 1972, and represented Venezuela at Miss Universe 1972, where she finished as the 2nd runner-up.

== See also ==
- Italo-venezuelans

Preceded by Jeannette Donzella	Miss Venezuela; 1972	Succeeded by Desireé Rolando
