= Miss Congo (RC) =

Miss Republic of the Congo
- Formation: 2005
- Type: Beauty pageant
- Headquarters: Brazzaville
- Location: Republic of the Congo
- Members: Miss International
- Official language: French

Miss Republic of the Congo or Miss Congo (RC) is a national beauty pageant responsible selecting Congo'lese for ambassador of the country. In 2006 the country participated at the Miss International competition in China.

== Titleholders ==
Color key

- Declared as Winner
- Ended as runner-up
- Ended as one of the finalists or semifinalists

The winner of Miss Congo (RC) might compete at the Miss International or Miss Tourism Queen International if held.

Year	Miss Republic of the Congo	Notes
2005	Maurielle Nkouka Massamba	
2006	Fatouma Blanda Eboundit*	2nd Runner-up and Miss Bikini (Top 5) at Miss Tourism Queen International 2006
2007	Jolette Sven Wamba Miylou	
2008	Kelly Falco	
2009	Grace Obelo	
2010	Bel-Benoit Boudzoumou	

- (*) Miss Republic of the Congo 2008, Fatouma Eboundit is the first representative who placed in the 2nd Runner-up of "Miss Tourism Queen International 2006" in China.

== See also ==
- Miss Congo (RDC)
