= Miss Venezuela 1972 =

19th edition of the Miss Venezuela competition

- Date: July 12, 1972
- Presenters: Gilberto Correa; Liana Cortijo
- Venue: Teatro Paris (La Campiña) Caracas, Venezuela
- Broadcaster: Venevision
- Entrants: 16
- Placements: 5
- Winner: María Antonieta Cámpoli; Nueva Esparta

Miss Venezuela 1972 was the 19th edition of Miss Venezuela pageant held at Teatro Paris (now called Teatro La Campiña) in Caracas, Venezuela, on July 12, 1972.

Venevision aired the pageant for first time. Gilberto Correa and Liliana Cortijo co-hosted the event.

== Results ==
=== Placements ===
- Miss Venezuela 1972 - María Antonieta Cámpoli (Miss Nueva Esparta)
- 1st runner-up - Amalia Heller (Miss Sucre)
- 2nd runner-up - Marilyn Plessman † (Miss Guárico)
- 3rd runner-up - Nancy Kranwinkel (Miss Amazonas)
- 4th runner-up - Marydée Sierraalta (Miss Falcón)

=== Special awards ===
- Miss Fotogénica (Miss Photogenic) - Marydée Sierraalta (Miss Falcón)
- Miss Amistad (Miss Friendship) - Gloria León (Miss Zulia)
- Miss Simpatía (Miss Congeniality) - (Tie) Eva Medrano (Miss Anzoátegui), Miriam Bocanegra (Miss Apure) and Valentina Villegas (Miss Miranda)

== Contestants ==
- Miss Amazonas - Nancy de Lourdes Kranwinkel Plaza
- Miss Anzoátegui - Eva Medrano
- Miss Apure - Miriam Bocanegra
- Miss Aragua - Elizabeta Sartore Rossini
- Miss Bolívar - Gloria Gruber Figarelli
- Miss Departamento Vargas - Eiling Antonetti
- Miss Distrito Federal - Clara Gómez Velutini
- Miss Falcón - Marydée Sierraalta González†
- Miss Guárico - Marilyn Plessman Martínez Stapulionis†
- Miss Miranda - Valentina Villegas
- Miss Monagas - Auristela Quintero
- Miss Nueva Esparta - María Antonieta Cámpoli Prisco
- Miss Portuguesa - Luz Maria Sánchez Oraá
- Miss Sucre - Amalia Heller
- Miss Táchira - Ana Mireya Obregón
- Miss Zulia - Gloria León
