= Faridah Norizan =

Malaysian actress and model

Teh Faridah
- Born: Teh Faridah Ahmed Norizan; 1959 (age 66–67); Kuala Kangsar, Perak, Malaya
- Occupations: Former model; former actress; marketing officer; beauty pageant titleholder
- Height: 5 ft 6.5 in (1.69 m)
- Beauty pageant titleholder
- Title: Miss Perak 1976; Miss Malaysia Universe 1976
- Hair colour: Dark brown
- Eye colour: Black
- Major competitions: Miss Malaysia Universe 1976 (Winner); Miss Universe 1976 (Unplaced)

Teh Faridah (born 1959) is a Malaysian former actress and model as well as beauty pageant titleholder who was crowned Miss Malaysia Universe 1976. She represented Malaysia at the Miss Universe 1976 at Lee Theatre, Hong Kong.

In August 1976, Jelita magazine was established and Faridah was the first woman to be appeared on the cover of the magazine. Faridah was only 19-year-old at that time and was working as a marketing officer at Korean Airlines in Kuala Lumpur.

== Filmography ==
Year	Film	Role
1977	Pendekar	Cempaka
1977	Loceng Maut	Aluni
1979	Dendang Perantau	Faridah
1980	Sumber Ilhamku	
1981	Perjanjian Syaitan	

Awards and achievements
Preceded by Alice Cheong	Miss Universe Malaysia; 1976	Succeeded by Leong Li Peng
