= Miss Universe 1976 =

25th Miss Universe pageant

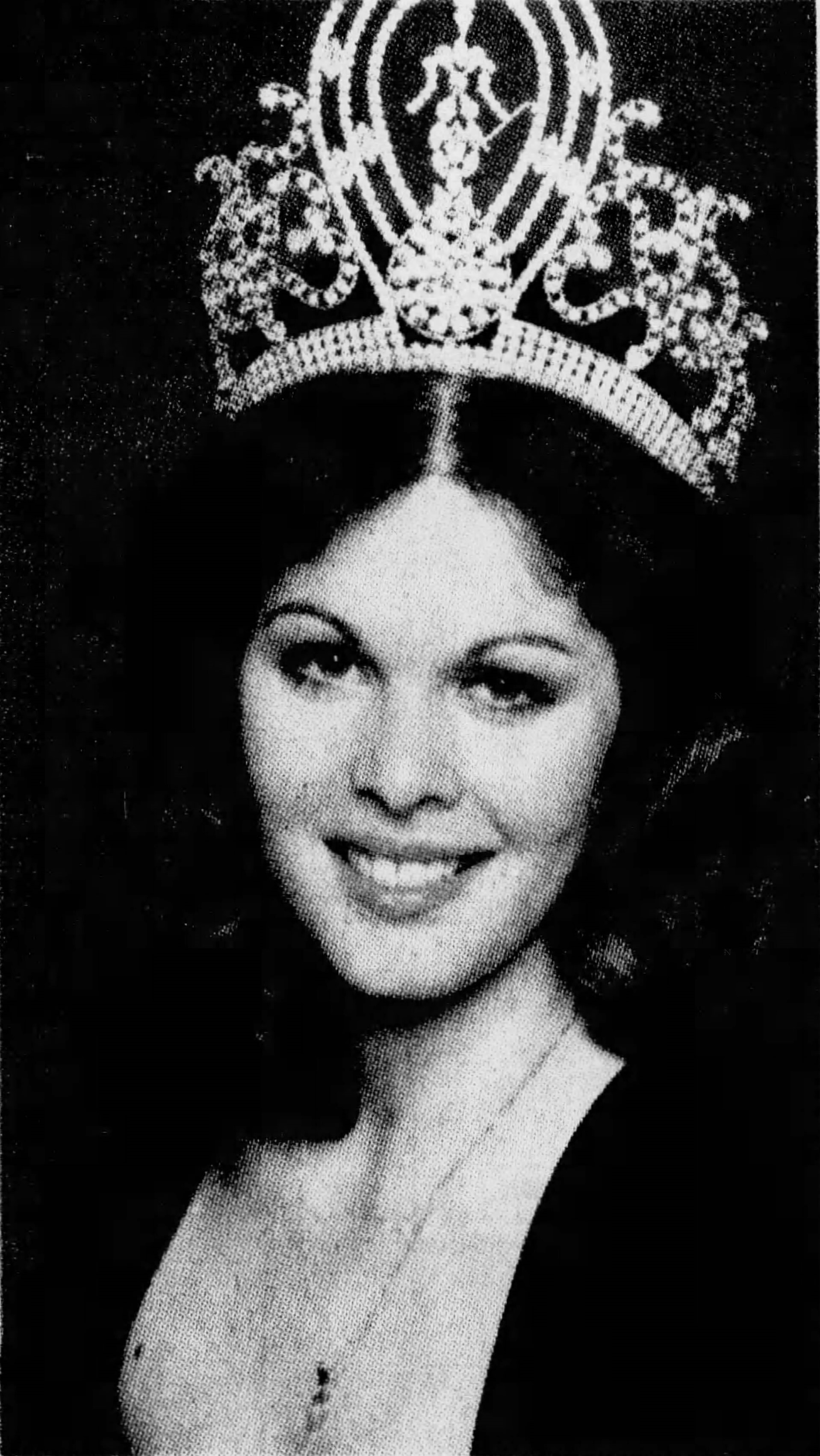
- Rina Messinger
- Date: 11 July 1976 (Note: The event was held at 8:00 am Hong Kong Time (UTC+08:00); for the Americas, this was July 10 in their local times.)
- Presenters: Bob Barker; Helen O'Connell
- Venue: Lee Theatre, Hong Kong
- Broadcaster: CBS (international) TVB (Host broadcaster)
- Entrants: 72
- Placements: 12
- Debuts: Barbados; Northern Mariana Islands; Papua New Guinea; Sint Maarten
- Withdrawals: Belize; Haiti; Jamaica; Lebanon; Micronesia; Morocco
- Returns: Honduras; Norway; Suriname
- Winner: Rina Messinger; Israel
- Congeniality: Margaret McFarlane (Trinidad and Tobago)
- Best National Costume: Rocío Lazcano (Peru)
- Photogenic: Pauline Davies (England)

Miss Universe 1976 was the 25th Miss Universe pageant, held at the Lee Theatre in Hong Kong, on 11 July 1976.

At the conclusion of the event, Anne Marie Pohtamo of Finland crowned Rina Messinger of Israel as Miss Universe 1976. It is the first victory of Israel in the pageant's history.

Contestants from seventy-two countries and territories participated in this year's pageant. The pageant was hosted by Bob Barker in his tenth consecutive year, while Helen O'Connell provided commentary and analysis throughout the event.

== Background ==
=== Location and date ===
On 3 August 1971, the Miss Universe Organization and the Government Economic Development Administrator of Puerto Rico signed a contract to bring Miss Universe and Miss USA to San Juan from 1972 to 1976. However, the Puerto Rican government canceled the agreement in February 1973 because, according to Puerto Rican government officials, the agreement was allegedly illegal.

The pageant's 25th anniversary was supposed to be held in Israel. However, it was announced on 15 January 1976, that the competition would no longer be held in Israel after the Israeli Ministry of Finance refused to allocate $300,000 to host the competition in the country. According to then-Finance Minister Yehoshua Rabinovitz, if competition for Israeli tourism and propaganda is good, the funds should come from the Tourism and Foreign Ministry budget.

On 6 February, Miss Universe Inc. president Harold Glasser announced that the 25th anniversary of the pageant would be held on 10 July in Hong Kong, and all money raised from tickets would go to The Community Chest of Hong Kong.

=== Selection of participants ===
Contestants from seventy-two countries and territories were selected to compete in the pageant. Two candidates were selected to replace the original dethroned winner.

==== Replacements ====
Miss Venezuela 1976 first runner-up, Judith Castillo, was appointed to represent Venezuela after Miss Venezuela 1976, Elluz Peraza, resigned after four days to get married. Miss Holland 1976 first runner-up, Nannetje Nielen, was appointed to represent her country after Miss Holland 1976, Lucie Visser, chose not to participate for undisclosed reasons.

==== Debuts, returns, and, withdrawals ====
This edition saw the debuts of Barbados, the Northern Mariana Islands, Papua New Guinea, and Sint Maarten, and the returns of Norway which last competed in 1973; and Honduras and Suriname which last competed in 1974.

Janet Joan Joseph of Belize, Angela Ruddock of Jamaica, and Ramona Karam of Lebanon withdrew for undisclosed reasons. Haiti, Micronesia, and Morocco withdrew after their respective organizations failed to hold a national competition or appoint a delegate.

Cleopatra Sanders of Antigua and Irene Penn of the British Virgin Islands were supposed to participate in this edition, but were unable to do so for undisclosed reasons. Amiot Moea of Tahiti was also supposed to participate, but withdrew from the competition after finding out that her mother fell ill.

== Results ==
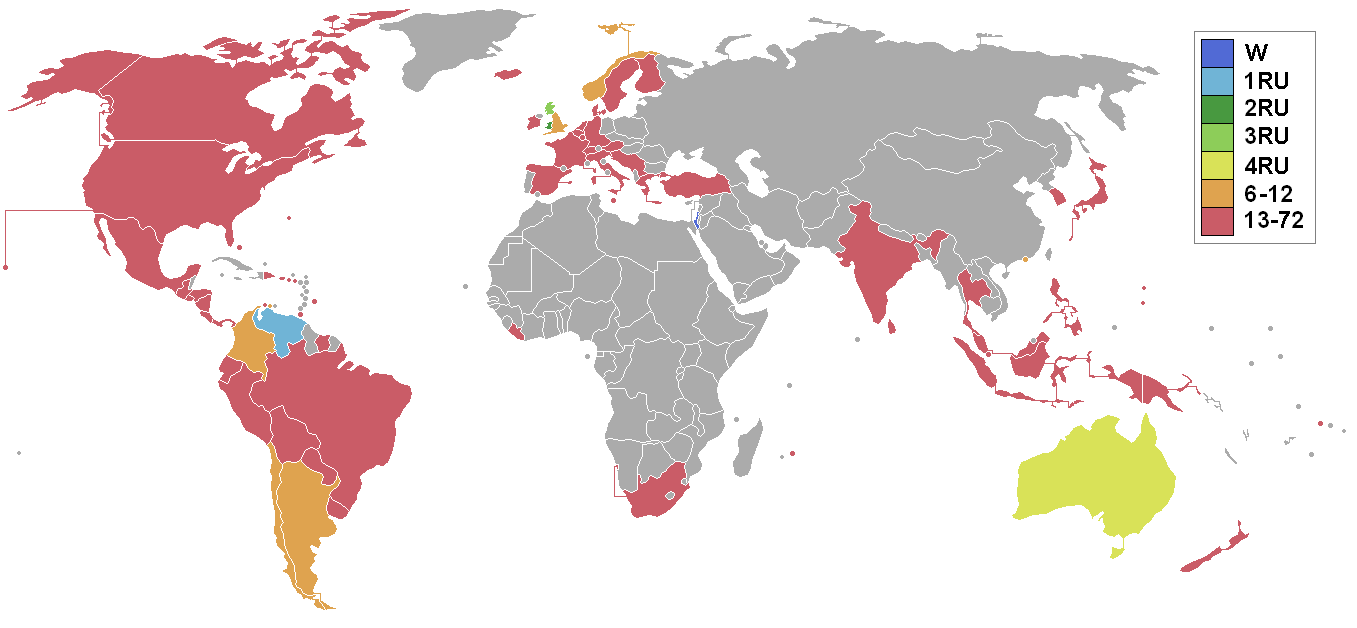
Miss Universe 1976 participating countries and territories

=== Placements ===
Placement	Contestant
Miss Universe 1976	Israel – Rina Messinger
1st Runner-Up	Venezuela – Judith Castillo
2nd Runner-Up	Wales – Sian Adey-Jones
3rd Runner-Up	Scotland – Carol Jean Grant
4th Runner-Up	Australia – Julie Ismay
Top 12	Argentina – Lilian Noemí de Asti; Chile – Verónica Sommers; Colombia – María Reyes; Curaçao – Anneke Dijkhuizen; England – Pauline Davies; Hong Kong – Rowena Lam; Norway – Bente Lihaug

=== Special awards ===
Award	Contestant
Miss Photogenic	England – Pauline Davies
Miss Congeniality	Trinidad and Tobago – Margaret McFarlane
Best National Costume	Peru – Rocío Lazcano

== Pageant ==
=== Format ===
Same with 1971, twelve semi-finalists were chosen at the preliminary competition that consists of the swimsuit and evening gown competition. The twelve semi-finalists participated in the casual interview, swimsuit, and evening gown competitions. From twelve, five finalists were shortlisted to advance to the final interview.

=== Selection committee ===
- Henri, Count of Paris – French noble
- Margareta Arvidsson – Miss Universe 1966 from Sweden
- Florinda Bolkan – Brazilian actress and model
- Britt Ekland – Swedish actress
- Dame Margot Fonteyn – English prima ballerina
- Aldo Gucci – Italian fashion designer and businessman
- Dong Kingman – Chinese-American painter
- David Newbigging – Hong Kong politician, chairman of Jardine Matheson
- Roman Polanski – Polish-French filmmaker
- Run Run Shaw – Hong Kong entertainment mogul and philanthropist
- Fred Williamson – American football player and actor

== Contestants ==
Seventy-two contestants competed for the title.

Country/Territory	Contestant	Age (Note: Ages at the time of the pageant)	Hometown
American Samoa	Taliilani Letuli	22	Pago Pago
Argentina	Lilian Noemí De Asti	19	Buenos Aires
Aruba	Cynthia Bruin	19	Oranjestad
Australia	Julie Ismay	24	Sydney
Austria	Heidi-Marie Passian	19	Lilienfeld
Bahamas	Sharon Smith	19	Nassau
Barbados	Jewell Nightingale	22	Saint Michael
Belgium	Yvette Aelbrecht	18	Brussels
Bermuda	Vivienne Hollis	19	Smith's Parish
Bolivia	Carolina Aramayo	17	La Paz
Brazil	Katia Moretto	18	Sorocaba
Canada	Normande Jacques	22	Blind River
Chile	Verónica Sommer	21	Valdivia
Colombia	María Helena Reyes	20	Bogotá
Costa Rica	Silvia Jiménez	21	San José
Curaçao	Anneke Dijkhuizen	18	Willemstad
Denmark	Brigitte Trolle	19	Copenhagen
Dominican Republic	Norma Lora	23	Santo Domingo
Ecuador	Gilda Plaza	21	Guayaquil
El Salvador	Mireya Calderón	19	San Salvador
England	Pauline Davies	22	Manchester
Finland	Suvi Lukkarinen	22	Helsinki
France	Monique Uldaric	22	Saint-Pierre
Greece	Melina Michailidou	18	Athens
Guam	Pilar Laguana	19	Hagåtña
Guatemala	Blanca Montenegro	20	Guatemala City
Holland	Nannetje Nielen	18	Amsterdam
Honduras	Victoria Pineda	22	San Pedro Sula
Hong Kong	Rowena Lam	18	Hong Kong
Iceland	Gudmunda Johannesdottir	19	Reykjavík
India	Naina Balsaver	18	Bombay
Indonesia	Juliarti Rahayu Gunawan	22	Jakarta
Ireland	Elaine O'Hora	20	Rathfarnham
Israel	Rina Messinger	20	Haifa
Italy	Diana Scapolan	21	Milan
Japan	Miyako Iwakuni	19	Osaka
Liberia	Laurine Johnson	19	Monrovia
Luxembourg	Monique Wilmes	19	Echternach
Malaysia	Faridah Norizan	19	Ipoh
Malta	Mary Grace Ciantar	19	Kalkara
Mauritius	Marielle Tse-Sik-Sun	23	Port Louis
Mexico	Carla Jean Evert	17	Acapulco
New Zealand	Janey Kingscote	22	Christchurch
Nicaragua	Ivania Navarro	19	Matagalpa
Northern Mariana Islands	Candelaria Borja	26	Saipan
Norway	Bente Lihaug	21	Oslo
Panama	Carolina Chiari	18	Panama City
Papua New Guinea	Eva Regina Arni	21	Port Moresby
Paraguay	Nidia Fátima Cárdenas	20	Asunción
Peru	Rocío Lazcano	20	Lima
Philippines	Elizabeth de Padua	20	Los Baños
Puerto Rico	Elizabeth Zayas	17	Salinas
Scotland	Carol Jean Grant	19	Glasgow
Singapore	Linda Tham	19	Singapore
Sint Maarten	Angela Huggins	18	Philipsburg
South Africa	Cynthia Classen	18	Cape Town
South Korea	Kwang-hyun Chung	19	Seoul
Spain	Olga Fernández	18	Pontevedra
Sri Lanka	Genevieve Parsons	22	Colombo
Suriname	Peggy Vandeleuv	18	Paramaribo
Sweden	Caroline Westerberg	18	Tierp
Switzerland	Isabelle Fischbacher	18	Vevey
Thailand	Katareeya Areekul	22	Bangkok
Trinidad and Tobago	Margaret McFarlane	19	Couva
Turkey	Manolya Onur	20	Istanbul
United States	Barbara Peterson	22	Edina
United States Virgin Islands	Lorraine Baa	23	Saint Thomas
Uruguay	Leila Viñas	22	Montevideo
Venezuela	Judith Castillo	18	Caracas
Wales	Sian Adey-Jones	18	Bodfari
West Germany	Birgit Hamer	19	Saxony-Anhalt
Yugoslavia	Svetlana Radojčić	18	Belgrade
