= Miss Universe 1971 =

20th anniversary of the Miss Universe pageant

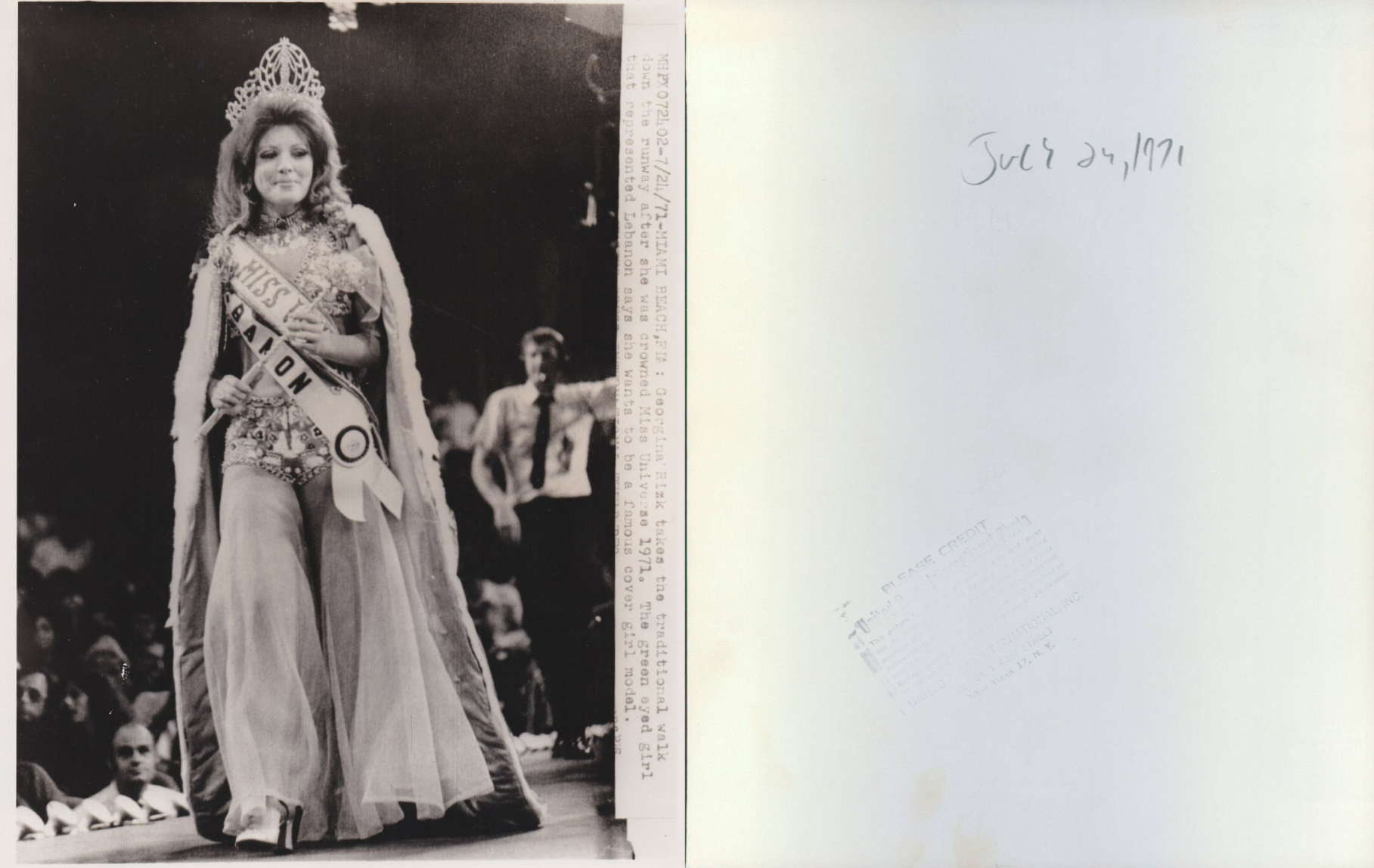
- Georgina Rizk
- Date: 24 July 1971
- Presenters: Bob Barker; June Lockhart
- Venue: Miami Beach Auditorium, Miami Beach, Florida, United States
- Broadcaster: CBS (WTVJ)
- Entrants: 60
- Placements: 12
- Withdrawals: Chile; Ceylon; Czechoslovakia; Denmark; Hong Kong; Paraguay
- Returns: Thailand; Trinidad and Tobago; United States Virgin Islands
- Winner: Georgina Rizk; Lebanon
- Congeniality: Magnolia Martínez (Peru)
- Best National Costume: María Luisa López (Mexico)
- Photogenic: Vida Valentina Doria (Philippines)

Miss Universe 1971 was the 20th Miss Universe pageant, held at the Miami Beach Auditorium in Miami Beach, Florida, on 24 July 1971.

At the conclusion of the event, Marisol Malaret of Puerto Rico crowned Georgina Rizk of Lebanon as Miss Universe 1971. It is the first victory of Lebanon in the competition.

Contestants from sixty countries and territories participated in this year's pageant. The pageant was hosted by Bob Barker in his fifth consecutive year, while June Lockhart provided commentary and analysis throughout the event. The Singing Lettermen performed in this edition.

== Background ==
=== Selection of participants ===
Contestants from sixty countries and territories were selected to compete in the pageant. One candidate was selected to replace the original dethroned winner, and another was selected after another national pageant was held to replace the original winner.

==== Replacements ====
Miss Virgin Islands 1971, Utha Williams, was disqualified for exceeding the age limit and was replaced by her first runner-up, Cherrie Creque. Williams was 28 years old at the time of the competition.

Miss Italy 1970, Alda Balestra, was supposed to represent her country in this edition. However, Enzo Mirigliani, the organizer of Miss Italia, decided not to send her to the competition, expressing concerns that American judges often overlooked Italian contestants. As a result, a separate competition was quickly arranged by Mario Pedretti to select a new representative for Miss Universe, ultimately won by Mara Palvarini.

Palvarini was shocked to discover that the Miss Universe competition had a policy prohibiting married women from participating. Consequently, on her wedding day, just three days after winning the title of Miss Italia Universo, Palvarini decided to postpone her wedding to compete in Miss Universe in Miami. Her fiancé fully supported her decision to participate in the event.

==== Returns and withdrawals ====
This edition saw the returns of Trinidad and Tobago which last competed in 1966, the United States Virgin Islands which last competed in 1968, and Thailand which last competed in 1969.

Miroslava Jancíková of Czechoslovakia withdrew after the Czechoslovak government banned beauty pageants in their country. Dorrit Weinrich withdrew due to feminist actions in her country. Marite Tomassone of Paraguay withdrew after a few days in Miami for undisclosed reasons. Ceylon, Chile, and Hong Kong after their respective organizations failed to hold a national competition or appoint a delegate.

== Results ==
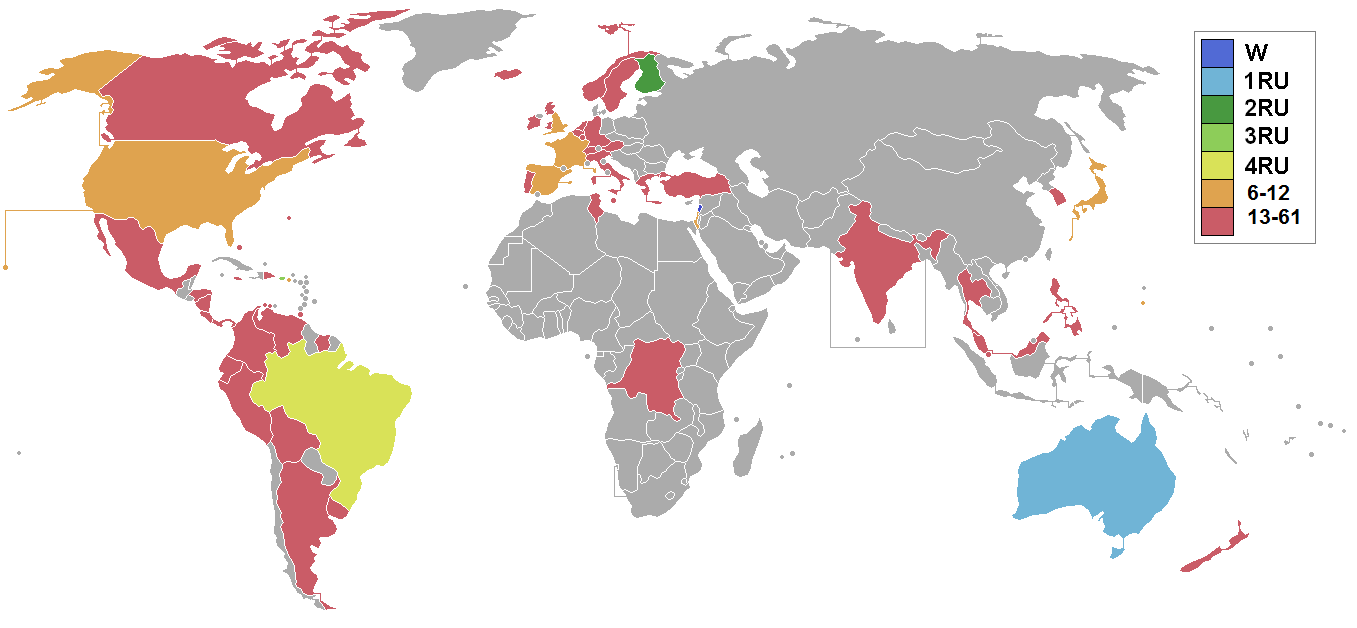
Miss Universe 1971 participating countries and territories

=== Placements ===
Placement	Contestant
Miss Universe 1971	Lebanon – Georgina Rizk
1st Runner-Up	Australia – Toni Rayward
2nd Runner-Up	Finland – Pirjo Laitila
3rd Runner-Up	Puerto Rico – Beba Franco
4th Runner-Up	Brazil – Eliane Guimarães
Top 12	England – Marilyn Ward; France – Myriam Stocco; Israel – Ester Orgad; Japan – Shigeko Taketomi; Spain – Josefina Román; United States – Michele McDonald; United States Virgin Islands – Cherrie Creque

=== Special awards ===
Award	Contestant(s)
Miss Amity	Peru – Magnolia Martínez
Miss Photogenic	Philippines – Vida Doria
Best National Costume	Mexico – María Luisa López
Top 10 Best in Swimsuit	Australia – Toni Rayward; Brazil – Eliane Guimarães; England – Marilyn Ward; Finland – Pirjo Laitila; Israel – Ester Orgad; Japan – Shigeko Taketomi; Lebanon – Georgina Rizk; Puerto Rico – Beba Franco; United States – Michele McDonald; United States Virgin Islands – Cherrie Creque

== Pageant ==
=== Format ===
Several changes were implemented in this edition. The number of semi-finalists was reduced to twelve compared to fifteen in previous years. The results of the preliminary competition and the closed-door interview determined the twelve semi-finalists selected. The twelve semi-finalists participated in the casual interview, swimsuit, and evening gown competitions. From twelve, five finalists were shortlisted to advance to the final interview.

=== Selection committee ===
- Margareta Arvidsson – Miss Universe 1966 from Sweden
- Eileen Ford – American model and founder of Ford Models
- George Fowler – American lawyer; former New York State Commissioner for Human Rights
- Yousuf Karsh – Armenian-Canadian photographer
- Jean-Louis Lindekens – Belgian columnist
- Dong Kingman – Chinese-American painter
- Line Renaud – French actress and singer
- Edilson Cid Varela – Brazilian journalist
- Itsuro Watanabe – President of the Japan-America Association
- Earl Wilson – American columnist and journalist

== Contestants ==
Sixty contestants competed for the title.

Country/Territory	Contestant	Age (Note: Ages at the time of the pageant)	Hometown
Argentina	María del Carmen Vidal	21	Santa Fe
(Netherlands Antilles) Aruba	Vallita Maduro	19	Santa Cruz
Australia	Toni Rayward	19	Sydney
Austria	Edeltraud Neubauer	18	Vienna
(The Bahamas) Bahamas	Muriel Rahming	24	Nassau
Belgium	Martine de Hert	18	Antwerp
Bermuda	Rene Furbert	20	Paget Parish
Bolivia	Ana María Landívar	18	Sucre
Brazil	Eliane Guimarães	21	Mariana
Canada	Lana Drouillard	20	Ancaster
Colombia	Piedad Mejía	23	Manizales
Costa Rica	Rosa María Rivera	18	San José
(Netherlands Antilles) Curaçao	Maria Vonhogen	19	Willemstad
Democratic Republic of the Congo	Martine Mualuke	19	Kinshasa
Dominican Republic	Sagrario Reyes	20	El Seibo
Ecuador	Ximena Moreno	18	Quito
England	Marilyn Ward	21	Hampshire
Finland	Pirjo Laitila	20	Helsinki
France	Myriam Stocco	20	Languedoc-Roussillon
Greece	Angela Carayanni	18	Athens
Guam	Linda Avila	18	Mangilao
(Netherlands) Holland	Laura Mulder-Snid	18	Amsterdam
Honduras	Dunia Ortega	19	Santa Bárbara
Iceland	Guðrún Valgarðsdóttir	18	Skagafjörður
India	Raj Gill	21	Dhule
(Republic of Ireland) Ireland	Marie Hughes	22	Dublin
Israel	Ester Orgod	19	Eilat
Italy	Mara Palvarini	20	Mantua
Jamaica	Suzette Wright	19	Clarendon
Japan	Shigeko Taketomi	21	Tokyo
Lebanon	Georgina Rizk	18	Beirut
Luxembourg	Mariette Francoise Fay	18	Mersch
Malaysia	Yvette Maria Bateman	21	Terengganu
Malta	Felicity Carbott	19	Valletta
Mexico	María Luisa López	21	Mexico City
New Zealand	Linda Ritchie	21	Rotorua
Nicaragua	Xiomara Paguaga	20	Managua
Norway	Ruby Reitan	23	Oslo
Panama	Gladys Isaza	18	Panama City
Peru	Magnolia Martínez	24	Lima
Philippines	Vida Valentina Doria	20	Binmaley
Portugal	Maria Celmira Bauleth	18	Portuguese Angola
Puerto Rico	Beba Franco	24	San Juan
Scotland	Elizabeth Montgomery	18	Ayr
Singapore	Jenny Wong	23	Singapore
South Korea	Mi-ae Noh	19	Seoul
Spain	Josefina Román	24	Cádiz
(Suriname (Kingdom of the Netherlands)) Suriname	Marcelle Darou	19	Paramaribo
Sweden	Vivian Oihanen	20	Vaxholm
Switzerland	Anita Andrini	19	Ticino
Thailand	Warunee Sangsirinavin	19	Bangkok
Trinidad and Tobago	Sally Karamath	22	San Fernando
Tunisia	Aida Mzali	18	Tunis
Turkey	Filiz Vural	18	Istanbul
United States	Michele McDonald	19	Butler
United States Virgin Islands	Cherrie Creque	20	Saint Croix
Uruguay	Alba Techira	19	Montevideo
Venezuela	Jeannette Donzella	18	Monagas
Wales	Dawn Cater	19	Cardiff
West Germany	Vera Kirst	22	Bavaria
