= Miss Congo (RDC) =

Beauty pageant

Miss République Démocratique du Congo
- Formation: 1968
- Type: Beauty pageant
- Headquarters: Kinshasa
- Location: DR Congo
- Official language: French
- Website: coeurafricain.org

Miss République Démocratique du Congo (Formerly known as Miss Zaire) is a national Beauty pageant in Congo.

== History ==
The Miss DRC pageant, originally known as Miss Zaire, began in 1968. Sponsored by the Ministry of Tourism in Kinshasa, the country has participated in major international competitions such as Miss Universe, Miss World, and Miss International. However, since 2009, the pageant ceased to compete due to a lack of funding and sponsorship.

In 2016, the Miss RD Congo Organization introduced new features in collaboration with the Ministry of Tourism and Pygma Communication, making the pageant a reality TV show.

In December 2019, the Minister of Tourism announced the return of the Miss Congo (DRC) competition, with plans to elect the winner from December 2019 to September 2020.

== See also ==
- Miss Congo (RC)
