= Miss Universe 1970 =

19th Miss Universe pageant

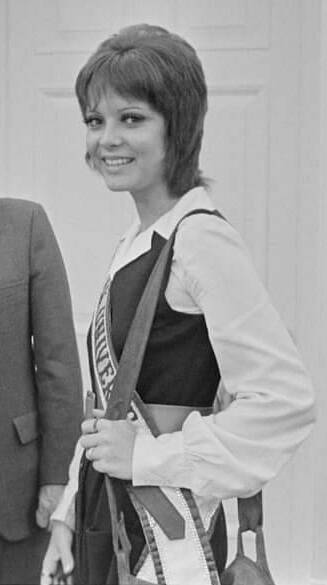
- Marisol Malaret
- Date: 11 July 1970
- Presenters: Bob Barker; June Lockhart
- Venue: Miami Beach Auditorium, Miami Beach, Florida, United States
- Broadcaster: CBS
- Entrants: 63
- Placements: 15
- Debuts: Czechoslovakia
- Withdrawals: Bonaire; Thailand; Yugoslavia
- Returns: Lebanon; Panama; Paraguay; Portugal
- Winner: Marisol Malaret; Puerto Rico
- Congeniality: Hilary Best (Guam)
- Best National Costume: Roxana Brown (Bolivia)
- Photogenic: Margaret Hill (Bermuda)

Miss Universe 1970 was the 19th Miss Universe pageant, held at the Miami Beach Auditorium in Miami Beach, Florida, on 11 July 1970.

At the conclusion of the event, Gloria Diaz of the Philippines crowned Marisol Malaret of Puerto Rico as Miss Universe 1970. It is the first victory of Puerto Rico in the competition.

Contestants from sixty-three countries and territories participated in this year's pageant. The pageant was hosted by Bob Barker in his fourth consecutive year, while June Lockhart provided commentary and analysis throughout the event.

== Background ==
=== Queen of Expo '70 ===
Prior to the competition in Miami Beach, fifty-four candidates traveled to Osaka, Japan, for the Queen of Expo '70 pageant, which took place at the 1970 Osaka Exposition on 20 June 1970. Not all candidates participated in the pageant, and the results did not influence their scores in the official competition in Miami. This event was intended as an experiment featuring computer judges rather than human ones. Josephine Wong from Malaysia was crowned the winner of the pageant.

=== Selection of participants ===
Contestants from sixty-three countries and territories were selected to compete in the pageant.

==== Debuts, returns, and withdrawals ====
This edition saw the debut of the Czechoslovakia, and the returns of Portugal which last competed in 1965; Panama and Paraguay in 1967; and Lebanon, which last competed in 1968.

Despite competing at the Queen of Expo '70 pageant, Miss Thailand 1969, Warunee Sangsirinavin was disqualified for not meeting the minimum age requirement. She competed a year later. Snežana Džambas of Yugoslavia withdrew for health reasons which caused her not compete at the preliminary competition. Bonaire withdrew for financial reasons.

== Results ==
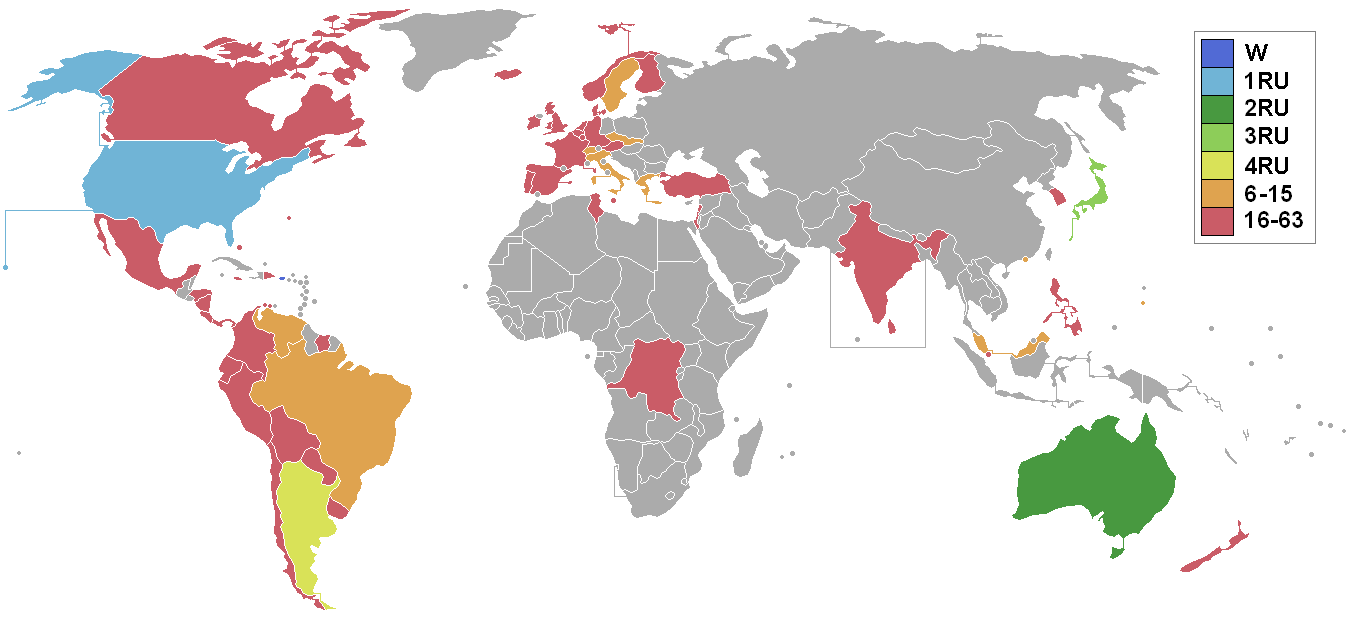
Miss Universe 1970 participating nations and results

=== Placements ===
Placement	Contestant
Miss Universe 1970	Puerto Rico – Marisol Malaret
1st Runner-Up	United States – Deborah Shelton
2nd Runner-Up	Australia – Joan Zealand
3rd Runner-Up	Japan – Jun Shimada
4th Runner-Up	Argentina – Beatriz Gross
Top 15	Brazil – Eliane Thompson; Czechoslovakia – Kristina Hanzalová; Greece – Angelique Bourlessa; Guam – Hilary Best; Hong Kong – Mabel Hawkett; Italy – Anna Zamboni; Malaysia – Josephine Wong; Sweden – Britt-Inger Johansson; Switzerland – Diane Roth; Venezuela – Bella La Rosa

=== Special awards ===
Award	Contestant
Miss Amity	Guam – Hilary Best
Miss Photogenic	Bermuda – Margaret Hill
Best National Costume	Bolivia – Roxana Brown
Queen of Expo '70	Malaysia – Josephine Wong
Top 10 Best in Swimsuit	Argentina – Beatriz Gross; Australia – Joan Zealand; Brazil – Eliane Thompson; Czechoslovakia – Kristina Hanzalová; Holland – Maureen Renzen; Japan – Jun Shimada; Malaysia – Josephine Wong; Puerto Rico – Marisol Malaret; Sweden – Britt-Inger Johansson; United States – Deborah Shelton

== Pageant ==
=== Format ===
Same with 1966, fifteen semi-finalists were chosen at the preliminary competition that consists of the swimsuit and evening gown competition. Each of the fifteen semi-finalists were individually interviewed by Bob Barker. Following the interviews, the fifteen semi-finalists participated in the swimsuit and evening gown competitions. From fifteen, five contestants were shortlisted to advance to the final interview.

=== Selection committee ===
- Julio Alemán – Mexican actor
- Pearl Bailey – American actress and singer
- Eileen Ford – American model and founder of Ford Models
- Yousuf Karsh – Armenian-Canadian photographer
- Dong Kingman – Chinese-American painter
- David Merrick – American theatre producer
- Line Renaud – French actress and singer
- Corinna Tsopei – Miss Universe 1964 from Greece
- Edilson Cid Varela – Brazilian journalist
- Earl Wilson – American columnist and journalist

== Contestants ==
Sixty-three contestants competed for the title.

Country/Territory	Contestant	Age (Note: Ages at the time of the pageant)	Hometown
Argentina	Beatriz Gros	21	Buenos Aires
Aruba	Linda Richardson	20	Oranjestad
Australia	Joan Zealand	24	Sydney
Austria	Elfriede Kurz	19	Linz
Bahamas	Antoinette Patrice DeGregory	19	Nassau
Belgium	Francine Martin	20	Liège
Bermuda	Margaret Hill	21	Hamilton
Bolivia	Roxana Brown	18	La Paz
Brazil	Eliane Thompson	20	Piraí
Canada	Norma Hickey	19	Prince Edward Island
Ceylon	Yolanda Ahlip	22	Colombo
Chile	Soledad Errázuriz	19	Santiago
Colombia	María Luisa Riascos	18	Antioquia
Costa Rica	Lillian Berrocal	18	Cartago
Curaçao	Nilva Maduro	21	Willemstad
Czechoslovakia	Kristina Hanzalová	20	Bratislava
Democratic Republic of the Congo	Marie-Josée Basoko	22	Kinshasa
Denmark	Winnie Hollmann	23	Copenhagen
Dominican Republic	Sobeida Fernández	18	Valverde
Ecuador	Zoila Montesinos	18	Portoviejo
England	Yvonne Ormes	21	Nantwich
Finland	Ursula Rainio	20	Rovaniemi
France	Françoise Durand-Behot	23	Paris
Greece	Angelique Bourlessa	23	Athens
Guam	Hilary Best	18	Yigo
Holland	Maureen Renzen	19	The Hague
Honduras	Francis Van Tuyl	18	Cortés
Hong Kong	Mabel Hawkett	18	Hong Kong
Iceland	Erna Jóhannesdottir	19	Reykjavík
India	Veena Sajnani	23	Bombay
Ireland	Rita Doherty	21	Fermanagh
Israel	Moshit Tsiporin	20	Ramat Gan
Italy	Anna Zamboni	18	Turin
Jamaica	Sheila Neil	23	Kingston
Japan	Jun Shimada	21	Tokyo
Lebanon	Georgette Gero	20	Beirut
Luxembourg	Josée Reinert	18	Esch-sur-Alzette
Malaysia	Josephine Wong	18	Ipoh
Malta	Tessie Pisani	18	Birkirkara
Mexico	Libia Zulema	18	Sinaloa
New Zealand	Glenys Treweek	19	Auckland
Nicaragua	Graciela Salazar	18	León
Norway	Vibeke Steineger	22	Bergen
Panama	Berta López	18	Santiago
Paraguay	Teresa Brítez	18	Paraguarí
Peru	Cristina Málaga	21	Arequipa
Philippines	Simonette de los Reyes	19	Pasay
Portugal	Ana Maria Lucas	21	Lisbon
Puerto Rico	Marisol Malaret	20	Santurce
Scotland	Lee Marshall	19	Wishaw
Singapore	Cecilia Undasan	21	Singapore
South Korea	Young-ae Yoo	18	Seoul
Spain	Noelia Afonso	19	Canary Islands
(Suriname (Kingdom of the Netherlands)) Suriname	Ingrid Mamadeus	20	Paramaribo
Sweden	Britt-Inger Johansson	19	Kalmar
Switzerland	Diane Roth	18	Geneva
Tunisia	Zohra Tabania	18	Tunis
Turkey	Asuman Tuğberk	18	Istanbul
United States	Deborah Shelton	21	Norfolk
Uruguay	Renee Buoncristiano	22	Montevideo
Venezuela	Bella La Rosa	20	Carabobo
Wales	Sandra Cater	21	Carmarthen
West Germany	Irene Neumann	22	Garmisch-Partenkirchen
