= Marisol Malaret =

Puerto Rican pageant title-holder (1949–2023)

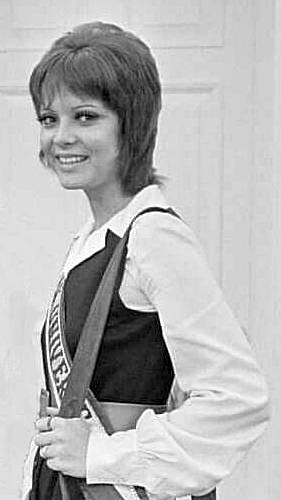
- Malaret in 1970 visiting President Nixon in the Oval Office
- Born: Marisol Malaret Contreras; October 13, 1949; Utuado, Puerto Rico
- Died: March 19, 2023 (aged 73); San Juan, Puerto Rico
- Height: 5 ft 8 in (173 cm)
- Spouse(s): Butch James (divorced); Corky Stroman (divorced); Frank Cué
- Children: 1
- Beauty pageant titleholder
- Title: Miss Puerto Rico 1970; Miss Universe 1970
- Hair color: Red
- Eye color: Blue
- Major competitions: Miss Puerto Rico 1970 (Winner); Miss Universe 1970 (Winner)

Marisol Malaret Contreras (October 13, 1949 – March 19, 2023) was a Puerto Rican TV host, model and beauty queen who won the title of Miss Universe 1970, becoming the first Miss Puerto Rico to win the title. She was also the first Caribbean woman to be crowned Miss Universe.

== Biography ==
Malaret Contreras was born in Utuado, Puerto Rico on October 13, 1949 to Antonio Malaret González and her mother, Lydia Graciella Contreras Silva. She started to work from an early age due to the death of her father and chronic illness of her mother. She was reportedly persuaded by Puerto Rican make-up artist Carmen Andino to compete in the Miss Puerto Rico pageant, then owned by Puerto Rican modeling guru and businesswoman Anna Santisteban. Malaret's strong will, ethics, and beauty made her a crowd favorite in the local contest. Before winning, she worked as an executive secretary for the Puerto Rico Telephone Company.

Malaret had one brother Jesús, and five half-siblings Joseph, Alicia, Rita, Antonio, and Raul. Her parents were Lydia Contreras and José Antonio Malaret. She was married three times; to former male model Butch James, musician Corky Stroman, with whom she had her only child Sasha, and Cuban-born engineer Frank Cué.

Malaret died from complications of a pulmonary condition on March 19, 2023, at age 73.

== Miss Universe 1970 ==
The auburn-haired, blue-green-eyed Malaret won the title on July 11, 1970, at the Miami Beach Auditorium in Miami Beach, Florida. Her victory also made her the first Puerto Rican and the first Caribbean to win the Miss Universe title. Additionally, she obtained Puerto Rico's first ever placement at Miss Universe since its inception in 1952 and was the first Puerto Rican woman to win a major international pageant.

After her win in the Miss Universe pageant, she was honored with what was considered until then one of the biggest welcomings ever at San Juan's Isla Verde International Airport. The New York Times reported that "50,000 turned out in San Juan to honor a Queen."

She was also invited to the White House for a visit in the Oval Office with then-President Richard Nixon.

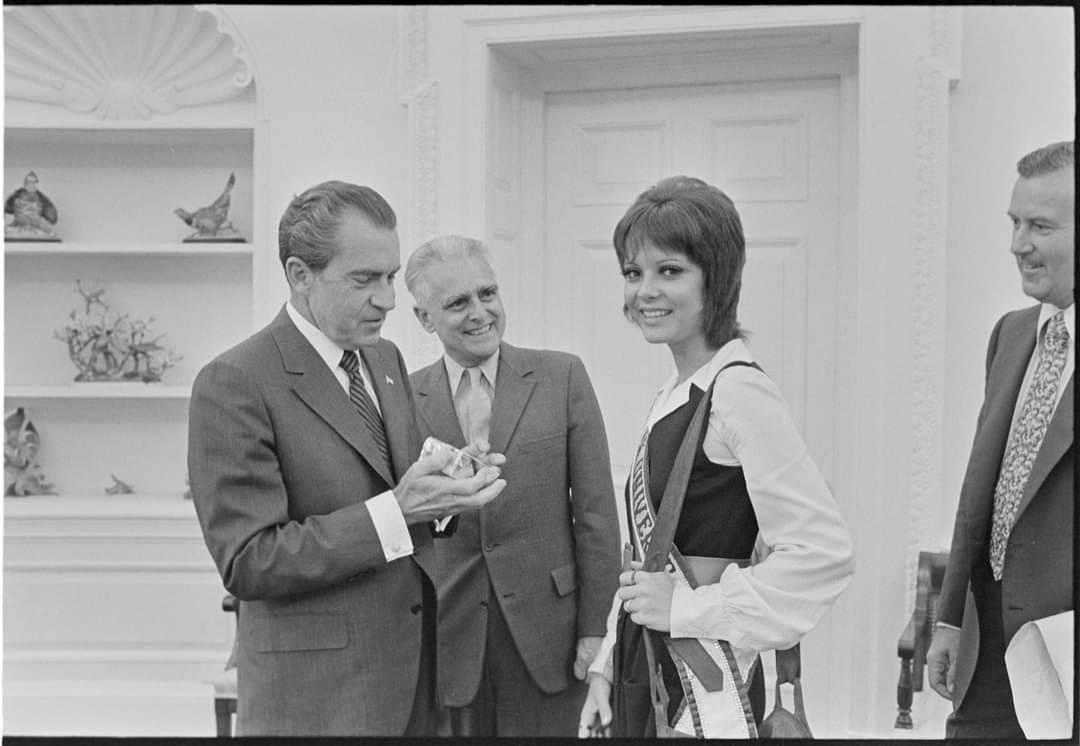
Malaret meeting the President of the United States, Richard Nixon, in the Oval Office in 1970

Malaret's face graced the covers of many international and Puerto Rican entertainment and gossip magazines, such as Vea, Teve Guía, Artistas, Estrellas, and its smaller version Estrellitas. She participated in many advertising campaigns, and performed occasionally as a motivational speaker to young women and aspiring business leaders.

== See also ==
- List of Puerto Ricans
- French immigration to Puerto Rico
- List of television presenters
- History of women in Puerto Rico

Awards and achievements
Preceded by (Philippines) Gloria Diaz	Miss Universe; 1970	Succeeded by (Lebanon) Georgina Rizk
Preceded by Aida Betancourt	Miss Puerto Rico; 1970	Succeeded by Beba Franco
