= Big Four beauty pageants =

Miss World, Miss Universe, Miss International and Miss Earth

Big Four
- The Big Four Beauty Pageants; Major International Beauty Pageants
- Affiliations: Miss World; Miss Universe; Miss International; Miss Earth

The Big Four or the Big League Pageants refers to the four major international beauty pageants for women — Miss World, Miss Universe, Miss International and Miss Earth.

The group was first described by the China Daily newspaper in 2004 as "the world's four major beauty contests". In April 2008, the South China Morning Post described them as "four of the world's top beauty pageants"; the same description was also used by South Korea's leading newspaper, Chosun Ilbo in 2010. In 2017, the Latin Times considered the group as the "most important pageants in the world". In 2018, NBC News referred to them as the "four biggest international pageants". Agencia EFE in 2019 classified them as the "four most influential beauty pageants in the world".

Among the hundreds of thousands of beauty contests held annually, the Big Four are considered the most prestigious, widely covered and broadcast by media. The Wall Street Journal, BBC News, CNN, Xinhua News Agency, and global news agencies such as Reuters, Associated Press and Agence France-Presse collectively refer to the four major pageants as the "Big Four".

National beauty pageants in some countries have historically used their final placements to select representatives for different international competitions, including Miss Universe and Miss World. In India, for example, the winner of Miss India represented the country at Miss Universe, while the first runner-up represented India at Miss World in 1994. Such selection arrangements varied among countries and changed over time.

== Big Four pageants ==
- Miss World is the oldest existing major international beauty pageant. It was created in the United Kingdom by Eric Morley in 1951. Since Morley's death in 2000, his widow, Julia Morley, co-chairs the pageant.
- Miss Universe is an international beauty pageant that is run by the Miss Universe Organization. It is currently owned by JKN Global Group and Legacy Holding Group USA Inc., an American division of Mexican company Legacy Holding through the joint venture company JKN Legacy Inc. The pageant was founded in 1952 by California clothing company Pacific Mills. The pageant became part of Kayser-Roth and then Gulf+Western Industries, before being acquired by Donald Trump in 1996, and WME/IMG in 2015.
- Miss International, also called "Miss International Beauty", is a Tokyo-based international beauty pageant organized by The International Culture Association. The pageant was first held in 1960.
- Miss Earth is an annual international environmental-themed beauty pageant promoting environmental awareness organized by Manila-based Carousel Productions through the Miss Earth Foundation and was first held in 2001. The pageant is affiliated with and works on projects with other institutions, including Greenpeace, World Wildlife Foundation, and United Nations Environment Program.

	Miss World	Miss Universe	Miss International	Miss Earth
Formation	29 July 1951; 75 years ago	28 June 1952; 74 years ago	12 August 1960; 66 years ago	3 April 2001; 25 years ago
Headquarters	London, England	New York City, United States; Samut Prakan, Thailand; Mexico City, Mexico	Tokyo, Japan	Manila, Philippines
Advocacy	Humanitarian causes through Beauty with a Purpose	Humanitarian issues and be a voice to effect positive change in the world	Achieve a world where women can live with positivity, inner strength, and individuality	Promote environmental awareness, conservation, and social responsibility
President	Julia Morley	Raul Rocha Cantú	Akemi Shimomura	Lorraine Schuck; Ramon Monzon
Organization	Miss World Limited	JKN Legacy Inc.	International Cultural Association	Carousel Productions

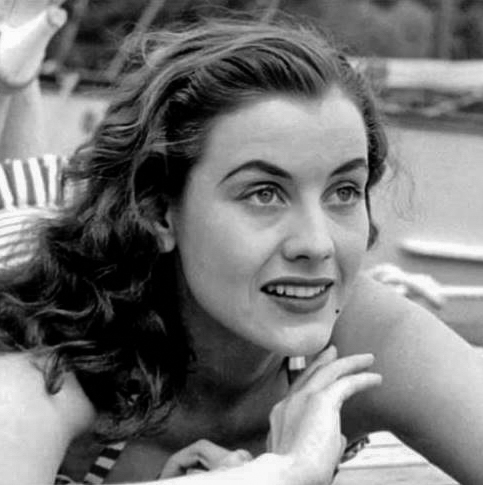
Miss World 1951
First winner of Miss World
Kiki Håkansson,
Sweden

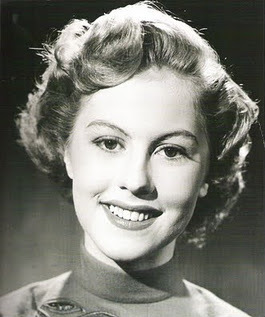
Miss Universe 1952
First winner of Miss Universe
Armi Kuusela
Finland

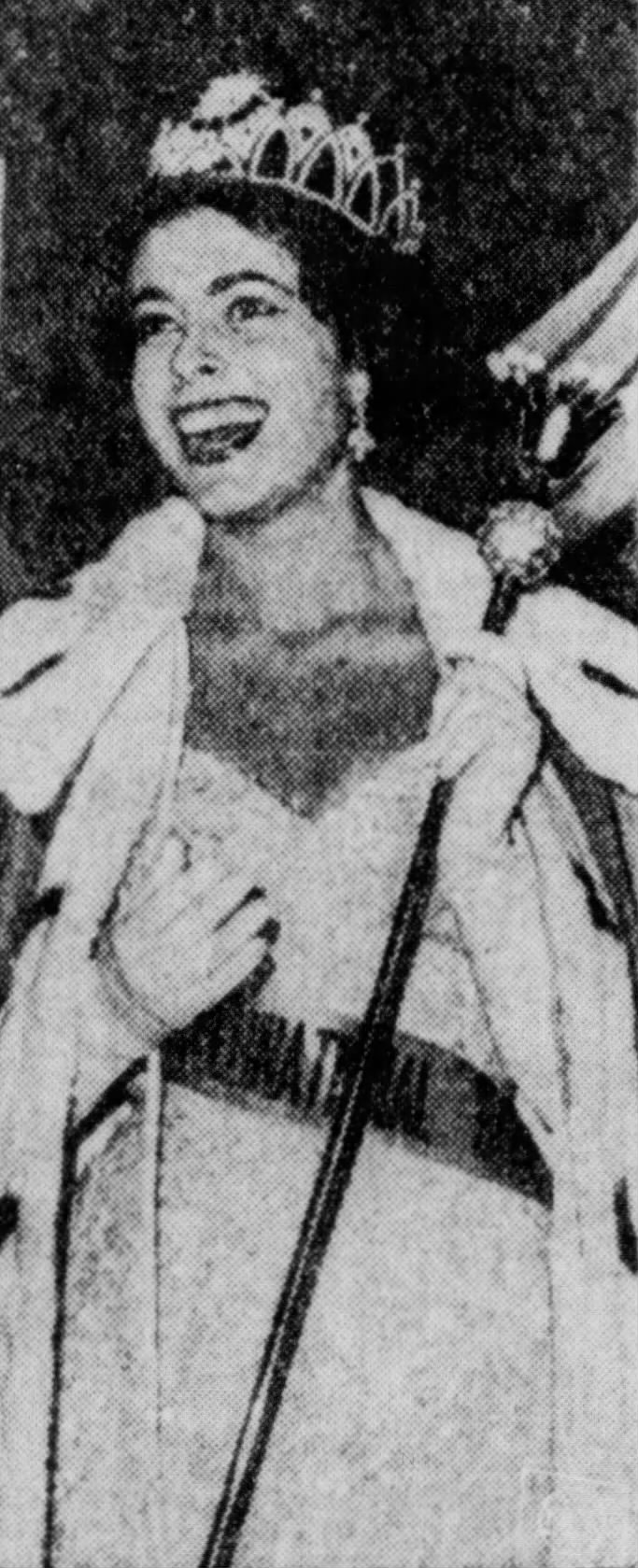
Miss International 1960
First winner of Miss International
Stella Márquez
Colombia

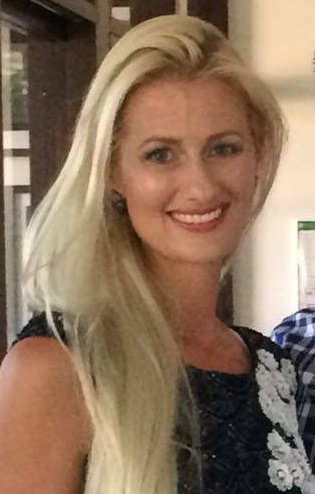
Miss Earth 2001
First winner of Miss Earth
Catharina Svensson
Denmark

In October 2005, Cynthia Kanema of Zambia earned the distinction of becoming the first woman to have participated in all four of the world's top beauty pageants: Miss World 2003, Miss International 2004, Miss Universe 2005, and Miss Earth 2005. In 2011, Miss South Africa Bokang Montjane became the first woman to both compete in all of the Big Four pageants and place in any of them: Miss Earth 2007 (Top 16), Miss International 2009, Miss Universe 2011, and Miss World 2011 (Top 7).

== Records ==
=== Complete achievement by countries/ territories ===
The following countries or territories have won each Big Four pageant at least once:

Country/Territory	Year Achieved	Total wins	Miss World	Miss Universe	Miss International	Miss Earth
Brazil	2004	6	1971	1963; 1968	1968	2004; 2009
Venezuela	2005	24	1955; 1981; 1984; 1991; 1995; 2011	1979; 1981; 1986; 1996; 2008; 2009; 2013	1985; 1997; 2000; 2003; 2006; 2010; 2015; 2018; 2023	2005; 2013
Philippines	2013	15	2013	1969; 1973; 2015; 2018	1964; 1970; 1979; 2005; 2013; 2016	2008; 2014; 2015; 2017
Puerto Rico	2019	10	1975; 2016	1970; 1985; 1993; 2001; 2006	1987; 2014	2019
United States	2020	16	1973; 1990; 2010	1954; 1956; 1960; 1967; 1980; 1995; 1997; 2012; 2022	1974; 1978; 1982	2020
Australia	2024	8	1968; 1972	1972; 2004	1962; 1981; 1992	2024

==== Brazil ====
The first country to win all four major international pageant titles was Brazil, when it won Miss Earth 2004. Brazil has won two Miss Universe crowns, two Miss Earth crowns, one Miss World crown, and one Miss International crown.

==== Venezuela ====
In winning Miss Earth 2005, Venezuela became the second country to win titles for each of the Big Four pageants. With two Miss Earth titles, seven Miss Universe titles, nine Miss International titles, and six Miss World titles, Venezuela is the country with the most wins in the Big Four pageants – and the most wins in the latter two pageants' respective histories. By winning Miss Earth 2013, Venezuela became the first and so far only country to win all four pageants multiple times.

==== Philippines ====
After winning Miss World 2013, the Philippines was the third country and the first in Asia to win all titles of the Big Four pageants. The Philippines currently has six Miss International crowns, four Miss Universe crowns, four Miss Earth crowns – the most wins in the pageant's history – and one Miss World crown. By winning Miss World 2013, Miss International 2013, Miss Earth 2014, Miss Earth 2015, and Miss Universe 2015, the Philippines achieved the feat in a span of only three calendar years. After winning Miss International 2016, Miss Earth 2017, and Miss Universe 2018, the Philippines currently holds the distinction of longest streak of wins in all four major beauty pageants with a streak of six successive years.

==== Puerto Rico ====
After winning Miss Earth 2019, Puerto Rico became the first territory and fourth country to win all titles of the Big Four pageants. Puerto Rico currently has ten Big Four crowns: five Miss Universe, two Miss World, two Miss International, and one Miss Earth.

==== United States ====
After winning Miss Earth 2020, the United States became the fifth country to win in all titles of the Big Four pageants. It currently has nine Miss Universe crowns – the most in the pageant's history – alongside three crowns in Miss World and three crowns in Miss International.

==== Australia ====
After winning Miss Earth 2024, Australia became the sixth country and the first in the oceanic region to win in all titles of the Big Four pageants. The country has two Miss Universe crowns, two Miss World crowns and three crowns in Miss International.

=== Longest streak of wins ===
The Philippines holds the longest streak of winning at least one of the Big Four pageant titles in a single year with wins in six consecutive years from 2013 to 2018 (Miss World 2013 and Miss International 2013, Miss Earth 2014, Miss Universe 2015 and Miss Earth 2015, Miss International 2016, Miss Earth 2017, and Miss Universe 2018), and is currently the only country in the world to win at least once in all of the Big Four pageant titles in any of its titles streak.

=== Multiple wins in the same year ===
France became the first nation to win at least two of the Big 4 beauty pageant titles in the same year, winning in 1953 (Miss Universe and Miss World), followed by Brazil in 1968 (Miss Universe and Miss International), Australia in 1972 (Miss Universe and Miss World), Venezuela in 1981 (Miss Universe and Miss World) as well as in 2013 (Miss Universe and Miss Earth), India in 1994 and 2000 (Miss Universe and Miss World), Ecuador in 2011 (Miss International and Miss Earth), and the Philippines in 2013 (Miss World and Miss International) and 2015 (Miss Universe and Miss Earth).

=== Back-to-back wins ===
In Miss World, three back-to-back victories have been recorded. In its first two editions, Sweden recorded back-to-back with Kiki Hakansson and May-Louise Flodin in Miss World 1951 and Miss World 1952, respectively. United Kingdom contestants Ann Sidney and Lesley Langley duplicated this feat in Miss World 1964 and Miss World 1965, respectively. The most recent back-to-back Miss World victories came from India, with Yukta Mookhey in Miss World 1999 and Priyanka Chopra in Miss World 2000 edition.

In Miss Universe, Venezuela is currently the only country to win back-to-back in Miss Universe 2008 and Miss Universe 2009. Stefanía Fernandez won the Miss Universe 2009 title in which Venezuela earned a Guinness World Record to have the first Miss Universe winner succeeded by her compatriot, Miss Universe 2008 Dayana Mendoza.

In Miss Earth, the victory of Angelia Ong in Miss Earth 2015, succeeding Jamie Herrell, Miss Earth 2014, made the Philippines to date the only country to win back-to-back in the Miss Earth pageant.

The Miss International competition, on the other hand, has yet to see a back-to-back win.

== Winners by year ==
Year	Miss World	Miss Universe	Miss International	Miss Earth
2026	Joheirry Mola; Dominican Republic	24 November 2026	25 November 2026	12 December 2026
2025	Suchata Chuangsri; Thailand	Fátima Bosch; Mexico	Catalina Duque; Colombia	Natálie Puškinová; Czech Republic
2024	Cancelled	Victoria Kjær Theilvig; Denmark	Huỳnh Thị Thanh Thủy; Vietnam	Jessica Lane; Australia
2023	Krystyna Pyszková; Czech Republic	Sheynnis Palacios; Nicaragua	Andrea Rubio; Venezuela	Drita Ziri; Albania
2022	Cancelled (Note: Competition was cancelled due to the COVID-19 pandemic)	R'Bonney Gabriel; United States	Jasmin Selberg; Germany	Mina Sue Choi; South Korea
2021	Karolina Bielawska; Poland	Harnaaz Sandhu; India	Cancelled	Destiny Wagner; Belize
2020	Cancelled	Andrea Meza; Mexico	Cancelled	Lindsey Coffey; United States
2019	Toni-Ann Singh; Jamaica	Zozibini Tunzi; South Africa	Sireethorn Leearamwat; Thailand	Nellys Pimentel; Puerto Rico
2018	Vanessa Ponce; Mexico	Catriona Gray; Philippines	Mariem Velazco; Venezuela	Nguyễn Phương Khánh; Vietnam
2017	Manushi Chhillar; India	Demi-Leigh Nel-Peters; South Africa	Kevin Lilliana; Indonesia	Karen Ibasco; Philippines
2016	Stephanie Del Valle; Puerto Rico	Iris Mittenaere; France	Kylie Verzosa; Philippines	Katherine Espín; Ecuador
2015	Mireia Lalaguna; Spain	Pia Wurtzbach; Philippines	Edymar Martínez; Venezuela	Angelia Ong; Philippines
2014	Rolene Strauss; South Africa	Paulina Vega; Colombia	Valerie Hernandez; Puerto Rico	Jamie Herrell; Philippines
2013	Megan Young; Philippines	Gabriela Isler; Venezuela	Bea Santiago; Philippines	Alyz Henrich; Venezuela
2012	Yu Wenxia; China	Olivia Culpo; United States	Ikumi Yoshimatsu (Note: Dethroned, no replacement); Japan	Tereza Fajksová; Czech Republic
2011	Ivian Sarcos; Venezuela	Leila Lopes; Angola	Fernanda Cornejo; Ecuador	Olga Álava; Ecuador
2010	Alexandria Mills; United States	Ximena Navarrete; Mexico	Elizabeth Mosquera; Venezuela	Nicole Faria; India
2009	Kaiane Aldorino; Gibraltar	Stefania Fernandez; Venezuela	Anagabriela Espinoza; Mexico	Larissa Ramos; Brazil
2008	Ksenia Sukhinova; Russia	Dayana Mendoza; Venezuela	Alejandra Andreu; Spain	Karla Henry; Philippines
2007	Zhang Zilin; China	Riyo Mori; Japan	Priscila Perales; Mexico	Jessica Trisko; Canada
2006	Taťána Kuchařová; Czech Republic	Zuleyka Rivera; Puerto Rico	Daniela di Giacomo; Venezuela	Hil Hernández; Chile
2005	Unnur Vilhjálmsdóttir; Iceland	Natalie Glebova; Canada	Lara Quigaman; Philippines	Alexandra Braun; Venezuela
2004	María Julia Mantilla; Peru	Jennifer Hawkins; Australia	Jeymmy Vargas; Colombia	Priscilla Meirelles; Brazil
2003	Rosanna Davison; Ireland	Amelia Vega; Dominican Republic	Goizeder Azúa; Venezuela	Dania Prince; Honduras
2002	Azra Akın; Turkey	Oxana Fedorova (Note: Dethroned, replaced by first runner-up); Russia	Christina Sawaya; Lebanon	Džejla Glavović; Bosnia and Herzegovina
2002	Azra Akın; Turkey	Justine Pasek (Note: Originally first-runner-up, replaced dethroned winner); Panama	Christina Sawaya; Lebanon	Winfred Omwakwe; Kenya
2001	Agbani Darego; Nigeria	Denise Quiñones; Puerto Rico	Małgorzata Rożniecka; Poland	Catharina Svensson; Denmark
2000	Priyanka Chopra; India	Lara Dutta; India	Vivian Urdaneta; Venezuela	Founded 2001
1999	Yukta Mookhey; India	Mpule Kwelagobe; Botswana	Paulina Gálvez; Colombia	Founded 2001
1998	Linor Abargil; Israel	Wendy Fitzwilliam; Trinidad and Tobago	Lía Borrero; Panama	Founded 2001
1997	Diana Hayden; India	Brook Lee; United States	Consuelo Adler; Venezuela	Founded 2001
1996	Irene Skliva; Greece	Alicia Machado; Venezuela	Fernanda Alves; Portugal	Founded 2001
1995	Jacqueline Aguilera; Venezuela	Chelsi Smith; United States	Anne Lena Hansen; Norway	Founded 2001
1994	Aishwarya Rai; India	Sushmita Sen; India	Christina Lekka; Greece	Founded 2001
1993	Lisa Hanna; Jamaica	Dayanara Torres; Puerto Rico	Agnieszka Pachałko; Poland	Founded 2001
1992	Julia Kourotchkina; Russia	Michelle McLean; Namibia	Kirsten Davidson; Australia	Founded 2001
1991	Ninibeth Leal; Venezuela	Lupita Jones; Mexico	Agnieszka Kotlarska; Poland	Founded 2001
1990	Gina Tolleson; United States	Mona Grudt; Norway	Silvia de Esteban; Spain	Founded 2001
1989	Aneta Kręglicka; Poland	Angela Visser; Netherlands	Iris Klein; Germany	Founded 2001
1988	Linda Pétursdóttir; Iceland	Porntip Nakhirunkanok; Thailand	Catherine Gude; Norway	Founded 2001
1987	Ulla Weigerstorfer; Austria	Cecilia Bolocco; Chile	Laurie Simpson; Puerto Rico	Founded 2001
1986	Giselle Laronde; Trinidad and Tobago	Bárbara Palacios; Venezuela	Helen Fairbrother; England	Founded 2001
1985	Hólmfríður Karlsdóttir; Iceland	Deborah Carthy-Deu; Puerto Rico	Nina Sicilia; Venezuela	Founded 2001
1984	Astrid Carolina Herrera; Venezuela	Yvonne Ryding; Sweden	Ilma Urrutia; Guatemala	Founded 2001
1983	Sarah-Jane Hutt; United Kingdom	Lorraine Downes; New Zealand	Gidget Sandoval; Costa Rica	Founded 2001
1982	Mariasela Álvarez; Dominican Republic	Karen Baldwin; Canada	Christie Claridge; United States	Founded 2001
1981	Pilín León; Venezuela	Irene Sáez; Venezuela	Jenny Derek; Australia	Founded 2001
1980	Gabriella Brum (Note: Resigned, replaced by first runner-up); West Germany	Shawn Weatherly; United States	Lorna Chávez; Costa Rica	Founded 2001
1980	Kimberley Santos (Note: Originally first runner-up, replaced original winner who resigned); Guam	Shawn Weatherly; United States	Lorna Chávez; Costa Rica	Founded 2001
1979	Gina Swainson; Bermuda	Maritza Sayalero; Venezuela	Melanie Marquez; Philippines	Founded 2001
1978	Silvana Suárez; Argentina	Margaret Gardiner; South Africa	Katherine Ruth; United States	Founded 2001
1977	Mary Stävin; Sweden	Janelle Commissiong; Trinidad and Tobago	Pilar Medina; Spain	Founded 2001
1976	Cindy Breakspeare; Jamaica	Rina Messinger; Israel	Sophie Perin; France	Founded 2001
1975	Wilnelia Merced; Puerto Rico	Anne Marie Pohtamo; Finland	Lidija Manić; Yugoslavia	Founded 2001
1974	Helen Morgan; United Kingdom	Amparo Muñoz (Note: Resigned, no replacement); Spain	Brucene Smith; United States	Founded 2001
1974	Anneline Kriel; South Africa	Amparo Muñoz; Spain	Brucene Smith; United States	Founded 2001
1973	Marjorie Wallace; United States	Margie Moran; Philippines	Anneli Björkling; Finland	Founded 2001
1972	Belinda Green; Australia	Kerry Anne Wells; Australia	Linda Hooks; United Kingdom	Founded 2001
1971	Lúcia Petterle; Brazil	Georgina Rizk; Lebanon	Jane Hansen; New Zealand	Founded 2001
1970	Jennifer Hosten; Grenada	Marisol Malaret; Puerto Rico	Aurora Pijuan; Philippines	Founded 2001
1969	Eva Rueber-Staier; Austria	Gloria Diaz; Philippines	Valerie Holmes; United Kingdom	Founded 2001
1968	Penelope Plummer; Australia	Martha Vasconcellos; Brazil	Maria Carvalho; Brazil	Founded 2001
1967	Madeleine Hartog-Bel; Peru	Sylvia Hitchcock; United States	Mirta Massa; Argentina	Founded 2001
1966	Reita Faria; India	Margareta Arvidsson; Sweden	Cancelled (Note: Competition was cancelled due to dispute of the organizers)	Founded 2001
1965	Lesley Langley; United Kingdom	Apasra Hongsakula; Thailand	Ingrid Finger; Germany	Founded 2001
1964	Ann Sidney; United Kingdom	Corinna Tsopei; Greece	Gemma Cruz; Philippines	Founded 2001
1963	Carole Crawford; Jamaica	Iêda Maria Vargas; Brazil	Guðrún Bjarnadóttir; Iceland	Founded 2001
1962	Catharina Lodders; Netherlands	Norma Nolan; Argentina	Tania Verstak; Australia	Founded 2001
1961	Rosemarie Frankland; United Kingdom	Marlene Schmidt; Germany	Stanny van Baer; Netherlands	Founded 2001
1960	Norma Cappagli; Argentina	Linda Bement; United States	Stella Márquez; Colombia	Founded 2001
1959	Corine Rottschäfer; Netherlands	Akiko Kojima; Japan	Founded 1960	Founded 2001
1958	Penelope Coelen; South Africa	Luz Marina Zuluaga; Colombia	Founded 1960	Founded 2001
1957	Marita Lindahl; Finland	Gladys Zender; Peru	Founded 1960	Founded 2001
1956	Petra Schürmann; Germany	Carol Morris; United States	Founded 1960	Founded 2001
1955	Susana Duijm; Venezuela	Hillevi Rombin; Sweden	Founded 1960	Founded 2001
1954	Antigone Costanda; Egypt	Miriam Stevenson; United States	Founded 1960	Founded 2001
1953	Denise Perrier; France	Christiane Martel; France	Founded 1960	Founded 2001
1952	May-Louise Flodin; Sweden	Armi Kuusela; Finland	Founded 1960	Founded 2001
1951	Kiki Håkansson; Sweden	Founded 1952	Founded 1960	Founded 2001

=== Attendance history ===
As of the Miss World 2026 edition that took place on 05 September 2026, there have been 16,028 entrants and 3,533 placements in the Big Four international beauty pageants.

Big Four	Miss World		Miss Universe		Miss International		Miss Earth	
Attenda.	Entrants	Placements	Entrants	Placements	Entrants	Placements	Entrants	Placements
Total	5,457	1,197	5,117	1,003	3,218	848	1,960	415
2026	111	40	-		-		-	
2025	108	40	118	30	80	20	78	25
2024	Cancelled		125	30	71	20	76	20
2023	112	40	84	20	70	15	85	20
2022	Cancelled		83	16	66	15	85	20
2021	97	40	80	16	Cancelled		80	20
2020	Cancelled		74	21	Cancelled		82	20
2019	111	40	90	20	83	15	85	20
2018	118	30	94	20	77	15	87	18
2017	118	40	92	16	69	15	85	16
2016	117	20	86	13	69	15	83	16
2015	114	20	80	15	70	10	86	16
2014	121	25	88	15	73	10	84	16
2013	127	20	86	16	67	15	88	16
2012	116	30	89	16	69	15	80	16
2011	113	31	89	16	67	15	84	16
2010	115	25	83	15	70	15	84	14
2009	112	16	83	15	65	15	80	16
2008	109	15	80	15	63	12	85	16
2007	106	16	77	15	61	15	88	16
2006	104	17	86	20	53	12	82	16
2005	102	15	81	15	52	12	80	16
2004	107	15	80	15	58	15	61	16
2003	106	20	71	15	45	12	57	10
2002	88	20	75	10	47	12	53	10
2001	93	10	77	10	52	15	42	10
2000	95	10	79	10	56	15	Founded 2001	
1999	94	10	84	10	51	15	Founded 2001	
1998	86	10	81	10	43	15	Founded 2001	
1997	86	10	74	10	42	15	Founded 2001	
1996	88	10	79	10	48	15	Founded 2001	
1995	84	10	82	10	47	15	Founded 2001	
1994	87	10	77	10	50	15	Founded 2001	
1993	81	10	79	10	47	15	Founded 2001	
1992	83	10	78	10	50	15	Founded 2001	
1991	78	10	73	10	51	15	Founded 2001	
1990	81	10	71	10	50	15	Founded 2001	
1989	78	10	76	10	47	15	Founded 2001	
1988	84	10	66	10	46	15	Founded 2001	
1987	78	12	68	10	47	15	Founded 2001	
1986	77	15	77	10	46	15	Founded 2001	
1985	78	15	79	10	43	15	Founded 2001	
1984	72	15	81	10	46	15	Founded 2001	
1983	72	15	80	12	41	15	Founded 2001	
1982	68	15	77	12	43	15	Founded 2001	
1981	67	15	76	12	42	15	Founded 2001	
1980	67	15	69	12	42	3	Founded 2001	
1979	70	15	75	12	45	5	Founded 2001	
1978	68	15	75	12	43	5	Founded 2001	
1977	62	15	80	12	48	5	Founded 2001	
1976	60	15	72	12	45	15	Founded 2001	
1975	67	15	71	12	48	15	Founded 2001	
1974	58	15	65	12	45	15	Founded 2001	
1973	54	15	61	12	47	15	Founded 2001	
1972	53	15	61	12	47	15	Founded 2001	
1971	56	15	60	12	50	15	Founded 2001	
1970	58	15	63	15	47	15	Founded 2001	
1969	50	15	61	15	48	15	Founded 2001	
1968	53	15	65	15	49	15	Founded 2001	
1967	55	15	56	15	46	15	Founded 2001	
1966	51	15	58	15	Cancelled (Note: Competition was cancelled due to dispute of the organizers)		Founded 2001	
1965	48	16	56	15	44	15	Founded 2001	
1964	42	16	60	15	42	15	Founded 2001	
1963	40	14	50	15	46	15	Founded 2001	
1962	33	15	52	15	50	15	Founded 2001	
1961	37	15	48	15	52	15	Founded 2001	
1960	39	18	43	15	52	15	Founded 2001	
1959	37	11	34	15	Founded 1960		Founded 2001	
1958	20	6	35	15	Founded 1960		Founded 2001	
1957	23	7	32	15	Founded 1960		Founded 2001	
1956	24	6	30	15	Founded 1960		Founded 2001	
1955	21	8	33	15	Founded 1960		Founded 2001	
1954	16	6	33	16	Founded 1960		Founded 2001	
1953	15	6	26	16	Founded 1960		Founded 2001	
1952	11	6	30	10	Founded 1960		Founded 2001	
1951	27	5	Founded 1952		Founded 1960		Founded 2001	

Placement history

Big Four	Miss World	Miss Universe	Miss International	Miss Earth
Placements	List: Top 5: 1 edition (1951); Top 6: 5 editions (1952–1954; 1956; 1958); Top 7: 1 edition (1957); Top 8: 1 edition (1955); Top 10: 14 editions (1988–2001); Top 11: 1 edition (1959); Top 12: 1 edition (1987); Top 14: 1 edition (1963); Top 15: 26 editions (1961–1962; 1966–1986; 2004–2005; 2008); Top 16: 4 editions (1964–1965; 2007; 2009); Top 17: 1 edition (2006); Top 18: 1 edition (1960); Top 20: 5 editions (2002–2003; 2013; 2015–2016); Top 25: 2 editions (2010; 2014); Top 30: 2 editions (2012; 2018); Top 31: 1 edition (2011); Top 40: 5 editions (2017; 2019; 2021; 2023; 2025)	List: Top 10: 20 editions (1952; 1984–2002); Top 12: 13 editions (1971–1983); Top 13: 1 edition (2016); Top 15: 25 editions (1955–1970; 2003–2005; 2007–2010; 2014–2015); Top 16: 8 editions (1953–1954; 2011–2013; 2017; 2021–2022); Top 20: 4 editions (2006; 2018–2019, 2023); Top 21: 1 edition (2020); Top 30: 2 editions (2024–2025)	List: Top 3: 1 edition (1980); Top 5: 3 editions (1977–1979); Top 10: 2 editions (2014–2015); Top 12: 5 editions (2002–2003; 2005–2006; 2008); Top 15: 50 editions (1960–1965; 1967–1976; 1981–2001; 2004; 2007; 2009–2013; 2016–2019; 2022–2023); Top 20: 1 edition (2024)	List: Top 10: 3 editions (2001–2003); Top 14: 1 edition (2010); Top 16: 13 editions (2004–2009, 2011–2017); Top 18: 1 edition (2018); Top 20: 6 editions (2019–2024); Top 25: 1 edition (2025)

Debut wins

Debut wins timeline
	Countries/Territories/States
1950s	List: 1951: Sweden; 1952: Finland; 1953: France; 1954: Egypt; United States; 1955: Venezuela; 1956: Germany; 1957: Peru; 1958: Colombia; South Africa; 1959: Japan; Netherlands
1960s	List: 1960: Argentina; 1961: United Kingdom; 1962: Australia; 1963: Brazil; Iceland; Jamaica; 1964: Greece; Philippines; 1965: Thailand; 1966: India; 1969: Austria
1970s	List: 1970: Grenada; Puerto Rico; 1971: Lebanon; New Zealand; 1974: Spain; 1975: (Socialist Federal Republic of Yugoslavia) Yugoslavia; 1976: Israel; 1977: Trinidad and Tobago; 1979: Bermuda
1980s	List: 1980: Costa Rica; Guam; 1982: Canada; Dominican Republic; 1984: Guatemala; 1986: England; 1987: Chile; 1988: Norway; 1989: Poland
1990s	List: 1991: Mexico; 1992: Namibia; Russia; 1996: Portugal; 1998: Panama; 1999: Botswana
2000s	List: 2001: Denmark; Nigeria; 2002: Kenya; Turkey; 2003: Honduras; (Republic of Ireland) Ireland; 2006: Czech Republic; 2007: China; 2009: Gibraltar
2010s	List: 2011: Angola; Ecuador; 2017: Indonesia; 2018: Vietnam
2020s	List: 2021: Belize; 2022: South Korea; 2023: Albania; Nicaragua

== Winners by country/territory ==
Country/Territory	Titles	Beauty pageant			
Country/Territory	Titles	Miss World	Miss Universe	Miss International	Miss Earth
Venezuela	24	6 (1955, 1981, 1984, 1991, 1995, 2011)	7 (1979, 1981, 1986, 1996, 2008, 2009, 2013)	9 (1985, 1997, 2000, 2003, 2006, 2010, 2015, 2018, 2023)	2 (2005, 2013)
United States	16	3 (1973, 1990, 2010)	9 (1954, 1956, 1960, 1967, 1980, 1995, 1997, 2012, 2022)	3 (1974, 1978, 1982)	1 (2020)
Philippines	15	1 (2013)	4 (1969, 1973, 2015, 2018)	6 (1964, 1970, 1979, 2005, 2013, 2016)	4 (2008, 2014, 2015, 2017)
India	10	6 (1966, 1994, 1997, 1999, 2000, 2017)	3 (1994, 2000, 2021)	×	1 (2010)
Puerto Rico	10	2 (1975, 2016)	5 (1970, 1985, 1993, 2001, 2006)	2 (1987, 2014)	1 (2019)
Australia	8	2 (1968, 1972)	2 (1972, 2004)	3 (1962, 1981, 1992)	1 (2024)
Mexico	7	1 (2018)	4 (1991, 2010, 2020, 2025)	2 (2007, 2009)	×
Colombia	6	×	2 (1958, 2014)	4 (1960, 1999, 2004, 2025)	×
South Africa	6	3 (1958, **1974**, 2014)	3 (1978, 2017, 2019)	×	×
Brazil	6	1 (1971)	2 (1963, 1968)	1 (1968)	2 (2004, 2009)
Sweden	6	3 (1951, 1952, 1977)	3 (1955, 1966, 1984)	×	×
United Kingdom	6	4 (1961, 1964, 1965, 1983)	×	2 (1969, 1972)	×
Germany	5	1 (1956)	1 (1961)	3 (1965, 1989, 2022)	×
Poland	5	2 (1989, 2021)	×	3 (1991, 1993, 2001)	×
Spain	5	1 (2015)	1 (1974)	3 (1977, 1990, 2008)	×
Czech Republic	4	2 (2006, 2023)	×	×	2 (2012, 2025)
Thailand	4	1 (2025)	2 (1965, 1988)	1 (2019)	×
Jamaica	4	4 (1963, 1976, 1993, 2019)	×	×	×
France	4	1 (1953)	2 (1953, 2016)	1 (1976)	×
Iceland	4	3 (1985, 1988, 2005)	×	1 (1963)	×
Netherlands	4	2 (1959, 1962)	1 (1989)	1 (1961)	×
Argentina	4	2 (1960, 1978)	1 (1962)	1 (1967)	×
Finland	4	1 (1957)	2 (1952, 1975)	1 (1973)	×
Dominican Republic	3	2 (1982, 2026)	1 (2003)	×	×
Ecuador	3	×	×	1 (2011)	2 (2011, 2016)
Japan	3	×	2 (1959, 2007)	1 (2012)	×
Canada	3	×	2 (1982, 2005)	×	1 (2007)
Peru	3	2 (1967, 2004)	1 (1957)	×	×
Trinidad and Tobago	3	1 (1986)	2 (1977, 1998)	×	×
Greece	3	1 (1996)	1 (1964)	1 (1994)	×
Norway	3	×	1 (1990)	2 (1988, 1995)	×
Denmark	2	×	1 (2024)	×	1 (2001)
Vietnam	2	×	×	1 (2024)	1 (2018)
China	2	2 (2007, 2012)	×	×	×
Russia	2	2 (1992, 2008)	×	×	×
Chile	2	×	1 (1987)	×	1 (2006)
Panama	2	×	1 (**2002**)	1 (1998)	×
Lebanon	2	×	1 (1971)	1 (2002)	×
Israel	2	1 (1998)	1 (1976)	×	×
Austria	2	2 (1969, 1987)	×	×	×
Costa Rica	2	×	×	2 (1980, 1983)	×
New Zealand	2	×	1 (1983)	1 (1971)	×
Albania	1	×	×	×	1 (2023)
Nicaragua	1	×	1 (2023)	×	×
South Korea	1	×	×	×	1 (2022)
Belize	1	×	×	×	1 (2021)
Indonesia	1	×	×	1 (2017)	×
Angola	1	×	1 (2011)	×	×
Gibraltar	1	1 (2009)	×	×	×
Honduras	1	×	×	×	1 (2003)
Ireland	1	1 (2003)	×	×	×
Kenya	1	×	×	×	1 (**2002**)
Turkey	1	1 (2002)	×	×	×
Nigeria	1	1 (2001)	×	×	×
Botswana	1	×	1 (1999)	×	×
Portugal	1	×	×	1 (1996)	×
Namibia	1	×	1 (1992)	×	×
England	1	×	×	1 (1986)	×
Guatemala	1	×	×	1 (1984)	×
Guam	1	1 (**1980**)	×	×	×
Bermuda	1	1 (1979)	×	×	×
Yugoslavia (Note: Yugoslavia does not exist as a country anymore. Now in today's Serbia, Montenegro, North Macedonia, Croatia, Slovenia, Bosnia and Herzegovina, and the partially recognized Kosovo.)	1	×	×	1 (1975)	×
Grenada	1	1 (1970)	×	×	×
Egypt	1	1 (1954)	×	×	×
Country/Territory	Titles	Beauty pageant			
Country/Territory	Titles	Miss World	Miss Universe	Miss International	Miss Earth
Not replaced resigned titles
Spain	1	×	1 (1974)	×	×
Not replaced dethroned titles
Japan	1	×	×	1 (2012)	×
United States	1	1 (1973)	×	×	×
Replaced resigned titles
~~Germany~~	1	1 (~~1980~~)	×	×	×
~~United Kingdom~~	1	1 (~~1974~~)	×	×	×
Replaced dethroned titles
~~Bosnia and Herzegovina~~	1	×	×	×	1 (~~2002~~)
~~Russia~~	1	×	1 (~~2002~~)	×	×

=== Winners by continent ===
Continent or region	Titles	Miss World	Miss Universe	Miss International	Miss Earth
Europe	65	27 (1951, 1952, 1953, 1956, 1957, 1959, 1961, 1962, 1964, 1965, 1969, ~~1974~~, 1977, ~~1980~~, 1983, 1985, 1987, 1988, 1989, 1992, 1996, 2003, 2005, 2006, 2008, 2009, 2015, 2021, 2023)	13 (1952, 1953, 1955, 1961, 1964, 1966, 1974, 1975, 1984, 1989, 1990, ~~2002~~, 2016, 2024)	21 (1961, 1963, 1965, 1969, 1972, 1973, 1975, 1976, 1977, 1986, 1988, 1989, 1990, 1991, 1993, 1994, 1995, 1996, 2001, 2008, 2022)	4 (2001, ~~2002~~, 2012, 2023, 2025)
North America	56	15 (1963, 1970, 1973, 1975, 1976, 1979, 1982, 1986, 1990, 1993, 2010, 2016, 2018, 2019, 2026)	25 (1954, 1956, 1960, 1967, 1970, 1977, 1980, 1982, 1985, 1991, 1993, 1995, 1997, 1998, 2001, **2002**, 2003, 2005, 2006, 2010, 2012, 2020, 2022, 2023, 2025)	11 (1974, 1978, 1980, 1982, 1983, 1984, 1987, 1998, 2007, 2009, 2014)	5 (2003, 2007, 2019, 2020, 2021)
South America	48	11 (1955, 1960, 1967, 1971, 1978, 1981, 1984, 1991, 1995, 2004, 2011)	14 (1957, 1958, 1962, 1963, 1968, 1979, 1981, 1986, 1987, 1996, 2008, 2009, 2013, 2014)	16 (1960, 1967, 1968, 1985, 1997, 1999, 2000, 2003, 2004, 2006, 2010, 2011, 2015, 2018, 2023, 2025)	7 (2004, 2005, 2006, 2009, 2011, 2013, 2016)
Asia	43	12 (1966, 1994, 1997, 1998, 1999, 2000, 2002, 2007, 2012, 2013, 2017, 2025)	13 (1959, 1965, 1969, 1971, 1973, 1976, 1988, 1994, 2000, 2007, 2015, 2018, 2021)	11 (1964, 1970, 1979, 2002, 2005, 2012, 2013, 2016, 2017, 2019, 2024)	7 (2008, 2010, 2014, 2015, 2017, 2018, 2022)
Africa	12	5 (1954, 1958, **1974**, 2001, 2014)	6 (1978, 1992, 1999, 2011, 2017, 2019)	×	1 (**2002**)
Oceania	11	3 (1968, 1972, **1980**)	3 (1972, 1983, 2004)	4 (1962, 1971, 1981, 1992)	1 (2024)
**Total**	**235**	**73**	**74**	**63**	**25**

The country/territory that assumed a position is indicated in bold
The country/territory that was dethroned, resigned or originally held the position is indicated in striketrough
The country/territory that was dethroned, resigned or originally held the position but was not replaced is indicated underlined

== See also ==
- List of beauty pageants
