= Miss Dominion of Canada =

Miss Dominion of Canada was a beauty pageant held in Niagara Falls, Ontario for many years, primarily at the Sheraton Brock Hotel, on July 1, Canada's Dominion Day (now known as "Canada Day"), beginning in 1959.

Sandra Campbell of Leamington, Ontario, representing Canada at the Miss Universe Pageant. Sandra represented Canada at Miss Universe in El Salvador, Miss World in London, Miss International in Australia, and Queen of the Pacific Pageant in Tokyo.

The winner of this pageant represented Canada at four of the world's largest international beauty pageants, Miss Universe (until 1977), Miss World (1962–1979), Miss International, and Queen of the Pacific. The Miss Dominion of Canada pageant originated when the Bruno family of Ancaster, Ontario, obtained franchise rights to select and send Canada's exclusive representatives to these international pageants. As many as 20 contestants selected via local pageants across many provinces of Canada competed in the annual Niagara Falls competition. Throughout the 1970s, there were generally between twelve and twenty contestants competing at the final judging.

== Selection Process ==
The Miss Dominion pageant required the finalists to participate in events including evening dress, swimsuit, interviews, talent, and various singing and dancing vignettes. Notable individuals selected as pageant judges would then select the runners up and the winner.

== Duties and Responsibilities of Miss Dominion of Canada ==
The contestant selected as Miss Dominion of Canada would visit nearly every Canadian province and other countries such as the United States, Japan, Australia, and Europe during her one-year reign. Until 1977, Miss Dominion of Canada was the country's representative at Miss Universe. The Miss Universe franchise in Canada was taken over by the nationally televised Miss Canada contest in 1978. Miss Dominion of Canada also represented the country at Miss World from 1962 to 1979 after which the franchise was taken over by Miss World Canada.

== Notable Miss Canada Winners ==
Famous or notable winners of this pageant include Sandra Campbell of Leamington, Ontario, who became a television personality in Sydney, Australia (Celebrity Squares and One in a Million) and a marketing executive with a major American corporation. Another notable winner is Jacquie Perrin, who for more than a decade was the host of CBC TV's award-winning investigative consumer program, Market Place. Now at CBC Newsworld, Jacquie has been involved in various special news projects and is seen weekly as the host of highly rated Saturday Report. Mary Lou Farrell made guest appearances on the Lawrence Welk Show, and used her stage name Aniko in performing in many Broadway musicals.

== The Pageant Lives On ==
Rumours that the Miss Dominion of Canada Pageant continued beyond 1979 have been present for many years. Despite the lack of media coverage from Canadian media, Miss Dominion of Canada delegates continued to represent Canada at various international contests, including Miss International, Maja Internacional and others throughout the 1980s. These women were selected by the franchise owners as Miss Dominion of Canada from 1980 until at least 1991; they included Linda Farrell (1987), Lee-Ann Bruce (1988) and Robin Nardi (1989).

There was also a Miss Teen Dominion of Canada Pageant for at least one year in the early 1970s.

Miss Dominion of Canada Pageant Director John Bruno died in 2004.

A history of Canadian beauty contests, including Miss Dominion of Canada, is currently under development in book form.

== Titleholders ==
Year	Miss Dominion of Canada	Province	Placement & Performance	Ref.
1959	Eileen Butter	Ancaster, Ontario	Unplaced at Miss Universe 1959	
1960	Edna Dianne MacVicar	Galt, Ontario	3rd Runner-up at Miss International 1961; Unplaced at Miss Universe 1960	
1961	Wilda Reynolds	Toronto, Ontario	Unplaced at Miss Universe 1961	
1962	Marlene Leeson	Ontario	Unplaced at Miss International 1963; Unplaced at Miss World 1962	
1962	Marilyn McFatridge	Toronto, Ontario	Top 15 at Miss Universe 1962	
1963	Jane Kmita	Regina, Saskatchewan	Unplaced at Miss International 1964; Unplaced at Miss Universe 1963; Unplaced at Miss World 1963	
1964	Mary Lou Farrell	Regina, Saskatchewan	Unplaced at Miss International 1965; Unplaced at Miss Universe 1964; Unplaced at Miss World 1964; Contestant at Miss Canada 1963	
1965	Carol Ann Tidey	Hamilton, Ontario	Top 7 at Miss World 1965; Top 15 at Miss Universe 1965	
1966	Diane Coulter	Wheatley, Ontario	Top 15 at Miss World 1966; Contestant at Queen of the Pacific Quest 1967	
1967	Donna Marie Barker	Ontario	Top 15 at Miss World 1967; Unplaced at Miss Universe 1967; Contestant at Queen of the Pacific Quest 1968	
1968	Nancy Wilson	Chatham, Ontario	Unplaced at Miss International 1969; Top 15 at Miss Universe 1968; Unplaced at Miss World 1968; Contestant at Queen of the Pacific Quest 1969	
1969	Jacquie Perrin	Ontario	Unplaced at Miss International 1970; Unplaced at Miss Universe 1969; Unplaced at Miss World 1969; Contestant at Queen of the Pacific Quest 1970	
1970	Norma Joyce Hickey	Charlottetown, Prince Edward Island	Top 15 at Miss International 1971; Unplaced at Miss Universe 1970; Unplaced at Miss World 1970; Contestant at Queen of the Pacific Quest 1972	
1971	Lana Drouillard	Windsor, Ontario	Unplaced at Miss Universe 1971; Unplaced at Miss World 1971	
1972	Bonny Brady	Perth, Ontario	Unplaced at Miss Universe 1972; Unplaced at Miss World 1972; Unplaced at Miss International 1972; Contestant at Queen of the Pacific Quest 1973	
1973	Deborah Ducharme	Port Colborne, Ontario	Unplaced at Miss Universe 1973; Unplaced at Miss World 1973	
1974	Sandra Margaret Emily Campbell	Leamington, Ontario	Unplaced at Miss Universe 1975; Unplaced at Miss World 1974; Unplaced at Miss International 1974; Miss Personality at Queen of the Pacific Pageant 1975	
1975	Normande Jacques	Blind River, Ontario	Unplaced at Miss Universe 1976	
1976	Pamela Mercer	Burnaby, British Columbia	Unplaced at Miss Universe 1977; Unplaced at Miss World 1976	
1977	Marianne McKeen	Burnaby, British Columbia	Unplaced at Miss World 1977	
1978	Brigitte Hoffman	Hamilton, Ontario	Unplaced at Miss World 1978	
1979	Catherine MacKintosh	Thunder Bay, Ontario	Unplaced at Miss World 1979	
1973	Deborah Ducharme	Port Colborne, Ontario		

== Miss Dominion of Canada at Miss International ==
Colour key

- Declared as winner
- Finished as a runner-up
- Finished as finalist or semifinalist.

Year	Miss International Canada	Province	National Title	Placement & Performance	Ref.
1960	Margaret Powell	Calgary	1st Runner-up-Miss Dominion of Canada 1960	Unplaced	
1961	Edna McVicar	Niagara Peninsula	Winner-Miss Dominion of Canada 1960	3rd Runner-up	
1962	Susan Peters	Ontario	-	Unplaced	
1963	Marlene Leeson	Ontario	Assumed-Miss Dominion of Canada 1962 (initially 2nd Runner-up)	Unplaced	
1964	Jane Kmita	Regina	Winner-Miss Dominion of Canada 1960	Unplaced	
1965	Mary Lou Farrell	St. John’s	Winner-Miss Dominion of Canada 1963	Unplaced	
1966	No Pageant Held				
1967	Marjorie Anne Schofield	Central Ontario	Assumed-Miss Dominion of Canada 1962 (initially 1st Runner-up)	Unplaced	
1968	Patricia Lane	Hamilton	2nd Runner-up-Miss Dominion of Canada 1968	Unplaced	
1969	Nancy Wilson	Chatham	Miss Dominion of Canada	Unplaced	
1970	Jacquie Perrin	Ontario	Miss Dominion of Canada	Unplaced	
1971	Norma Joyce Hickey	Darnley	Miss Dominion of Canada	Top 15	
1972	Bonny Brady	Perth	Miss Dominion of Canada	Unplaced	
1973	Nancy Henderson	Argyle	2nd Runner-up 1973	Unplaced	
1974	Sandra Campbell	Leamington	Miss Dominion of Canada	Unplaced	
1975	Anormande Jacques	Northern Ontario	Miss Dominion of Canada	Unplaced	
1976	Lynn Hore	Ontario	-	Unplaced	
1977	Jacki Dreher	Ontario	-	Unplaced	
1978	Kimberly Allan	Ontario	-	Unplaced	
1979	Karen Vanderwoude	Ontario	-	Unplaced	
1980	Marie Rinaz	Ontario	-	Unplaced	
1981	Carol Donlon	Ontario	-	Unplaced	
1982	Laura Claudia Ciancolo	Ontario	Miss Dominion of Canada	Unplaced	
1983	Starr Andreeff	Ontario	Miss Dominion of Canada	Unplaced	
1984	Terry Lee Bailey	Ontario	Miss Dominion of Canada	Unplaced	
1985	Jennifer Frances Bruno	Ontario	Miss Dominion of Canada	Unplaced	
1986	Irene Elizabeth Vermeulen	Ontario	Miss Dominion of Canada	Unplaced	
1987	Julie Christine McDonald	Ontario	Miss Dominion of Canada	Unplaced	
1988	Katherine Stayshyn	Ontario	Miss Dominion of Canada	Unplaced	
1989	Linda Marie Farrell	Ontario	Miss Dominion of Canada	Unplaced	
1990	Lee Ann Bruce	Ontario	Miss Dominion of Canada	Unplaced	
1991	Robin Elizabeth Nardi	Ontario	Miss Dominion of Canada	Unplaced	
1992	Lara Corwen Thornton	Ontario	Miss Dominion of Canada	Unplaced	
Canada did not participate in Miss International (1993–1998).
1999	Jennefer Jenei	Ontario	Attended Miss International 1999 but withdrew for unknown reasons.		
2000	Angeliki Lakouras	Ontario	-	Top 12	
2001	Shauna Olechow	Ontario	-	Unplaced	
2002	Alicia Victoria Altares	Ontario	-	Unplaced	

== Miss Dominion of Canada Runner-up ==
Year	Runner-up	Position	Province	Placement & Notes	Ref.
1959	Margaret Powell	2nd	Calgary	Unplaced at Miss International 1960	
1962	Marlene Leeson	3rd	Huntsville	Unplaced at Miss International 1963; Unplaced at Miss World 1962; Marilyn McFatridge was dethroned Sept. 1962 and replaced by Marlene Leeson.	
1966	Marjorie Schofield	2nd	Central Ontario	Unplaced at Miss Universe 1966; Unplaced at Miss International 1967; Diane Coulter resigned to get married, and was replaced by Marjorie Schofield during or before May 1967.	
1971	Deborah Tone	5th	Argyle	Unplaced at Miss Universe 1974; Unplaced at Miss Pacific Queen Quest 1974; Deborah Ducharme resigned in December 1973 to pursue a modelling career, and was replaced by Deborah Tone (5th in 1971).	
1973	Nancy Henderson	3rd	Argyle	Unplaced at Miss International 1973	
1979	Bonnie Johnson	3rd	Eastern Ontario	Unplaced at Maja International 1984	

=== Miss Maja International ===
Year	Delegate	Placement & Performance	Notes	Ref.
1969	Ann Soamaalia	Unplaced		
1982	Lindy Marie Gray	Unplaced		
1983	Terry Lee Bailey	3rd Runner-up		
1984	Bonnie Johnson	Unplaced		
1985	Jennifer Frances Bruno	Unplaced		
1986	Irene Elizabeth Vermeulen	Unplaced		
1987	Julie Christine McDonald	Unplaced		
1988	Linda Marie Farrell	Unplaced		
1989	Lee Ann Bruce	Unplaced		

=== Miss Wonderland ===
Year	Delegate	Placement & Performance	Notes	Ref.
1987	Kathryn Cummins	Top 15		
1988	Wanda Pyatt	Top 15		
1989	Marion McNaughton	Unplaced		

=== Miss All Nations ===
Year	Delegate	Province	Placement & Performance	Notes	Ref.
1989	Brenda Solange Hughes Ulloa	Ontario	Unplaced		

=== Miss Ambar del Mundo ===
Year	Delegate	Province	Placement & Performance	Notes	Ref.
1975	Annette Legrand	Ontario	Unplaced		
1978	Diane Rouleau	Ontario	Unplaced		

=== Miss Asia Pacific International ===
Year	Delegate	Placement & Performance	Notes	Ref.
1984	Jennifer Frances Bruno	Unplaced	Miss Friendship	
1985	Tanya Baser	Unplaced		
1987	Valerie Kettle	Top 10		
1988	Clara Leigh	Unplaced		
1989	Gloria Petrovic	3rd Runner-up		
1992	Helena Zupan	Top 10	Miss Photogenic	
1993	April Telek	Top 10		
1994	Susanne Rothfos	Top 10		
1995	Robin Palmer	Unplaced		
1996	Noelle Elizabeth Huta	Unplaced		
1997	Andrea Joan Verhoel	Top 10		
1998	Gabriella Petivoky	Unplaced		
2000	Mercedes Honoridez-Leggett	Top 10		
2002	Rachel Anne Solidarios	Unplaced		
2003	Rossana Tassone	Unplaced		
2005	April Angeline Simone Mullings	Unplaced		
The pageant was not held from 2006 to 2015.
2016	Natalie Carriere	Top 15		
2017	Maleeka Singh	Unplaced		
2018	Ariel Jingjing Cao	Unplaced		
2019	Jessica Victoria Cianchino	2nd Runner-up	Continents Queen of Americas; Miss Photogenic; Miss Culture Salon	
The pageant was not held from 2020 to 2023.
2024	Mya Bao	Top 10		
2025	Naomi Shotlander	Top 30		
2026	Canada withdrew from Miss Asia Pacific International 2026.			

=== World Queen of Banana ===
Year	Delegate	Placement & Performance	Notes	Ref.
2004	Anna Maria Ezechiels	Winner		
2005	Gretal Montgomery	3rd Runner-up		
2006	Olivia Gurun	Unplaced		
2007	Jennifer Schott	3rd Runner-up		
2008	Lina Lombana	Unplaced		
2009	Neda Derakhshanfar	Unplaced		

=== Miss Globe ===
Year	Miss Globe Canada	Placement & Performance	Notes
1988	Jody Keable	Unplaced	
1989	Maggie Montpelier	Unplaced	
1996	Natalie Spizzirri	Unplaced	
2002	Mias Santa Ana Pilar	Unplaced	
2005	Shenna Aperocho	Unplaced	
2006	Jessica Thibault	Unplaced	
2007	Natasa Delic	Unplaced	
2008	Stefania Cerbino	Unplaced	
2009	Shannelle Vogt	Unplaced	

=== Miss Intercontinental ===
Year	Miss Intercontinental Canada	Placement & Performance	Notes
1978	Unknown	—	Representative's name and province unknown.
1979	Unknown	—	Representative's name and province unknown.
1982	Laura Claudia Ciancolo	Unplaced	Unplaced at Miss International 1982.
2000	Caroline Frolic	Unplaced	
2001	Annette Melner	Unplaced	
2001	Michelle Weswaldi	Unplaced	Currently National Director of Miss World Canada. Unplaced at Miss World 1996. Unplaced at Miss Earth 2001.
2002	Anna Mae Abbea	Unplaced	
2004	Lauren O'Neill	Unplaced	
2006	Elisa Wang	Unplaced	
2008	Jenna Lee Creelman	Top 15	

=== Miss Young International ===
Year	Miss Young Canada	Placement & Performance	Notes
1970	Wendy J. Wilson	Unplaced	
1971	Kathleen Snoblen	Unplaced	
1972	Unknown	Unplaced	
1973	Unknown	Unplaced	
1974	Heather Best	Unplaced	Miss Friendship Award
1975	Unknown	Unplaced	
1977	Michele Robinson	Unplaced	
1978	Heather Anne Hazell	Unplaced	
1979	Brigitte June Hofmann	Unplaced	Unplaced at Miss World 1978.
1980	Patricia Glinka	Unplaced	
1981	Heather Jean Hiscox	Top 15	
1983	Lindy Marie Gray	Unplaced	

=== Miss Teen International ===
Year	Miss Teen International Canada	Placement & Performance	Notes
1966	Penny McEwan	Unplaced	
1967	Eva Patrick Marla Kocklik	Unplaced	
1968	Ane Grazyna Sapieja	1st Runner-up	
1969	Christine Kordiuk	Unplaced	
1974	Diana MacDonald	1st Runner-up	
1995	Shelly Carroll	Unplaced	
1996	Unknown	Unplaced	
1997	Bethany	Unplaced	
1998	Sandra Gail Wellmont	Unplaced	

== See also ==
- Miss Canada
- Miss Earth Canada
- Miss Universe Canada
- Miss World Canada
