= Miss World Sweden =

Beauty pageant

- Formation: 1951
- Type: Beauty pageant
- Headquarters: Stockholm
- Location: Sweden
- Members: Miss World
- Official language: Swedish

Miss World Sweden is a national Beauty pageant that has selected Sweden's representative to the Miss World pageant.

== History ==
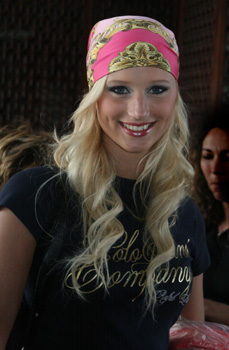
Annie Oliv, at Miss World 2007, Top 5

Firstly, Miss Sweden which ran from 1949 to 2003, by the lifestyle and women's magazine VeckoRevyn and production company Strix in partnership with MTG. The competition qualified delegates to the global Miss World contest. As the competition stopped running, it was replaced by separate pageants with various franchises, but lost the franchise in 2003. The pageant was under sponsorship by Studio Fashion Inc. and the marketing was done by the women's magazine Hänt Extra until 2020. After that the newly formed Miss Sweden pageant under the Miss Sweden Organization became the new sponsors/licenseholders with the main winner of Miss Sweden going to Miss World.

Sweden has the longest unbroken participation at the Miss World pageant, having appeared almost every year since the first edition in 1951, with the exception of 2018. Many of the contestants have gone on to notable careers in television and film.

== Controversies ==
In the 1970 Miss World pageant, held in London, United Kingdom, controversy followed after the result was announced. Black contestant Jennifer Hosten of Grenada won, and black contestant Pearl Jansen of South Africa placed 1st Runner-Up, after which the BBC and newspapers received numerous protests about the result, and accusations of racism were made by all sides. Four of the nine judges had given first-place votes to Miss Sweden Marjorie Christel Johansson, while Miss Grenada received only two firsts, yet Johansson finished fourth. Since the Prime Minister of Grenada (then Premier), Sir Eric Gairy, was on the judging panel, inevitably there were many accusations that the contest had been rigged. Some of the audience gathered in the street outside Royal Albert Hall after the contest and chanted "Swe-den, Swe-den". Four days later, organising director Julia Morley (1941-) resigned because of the intense pressure from the newspapers. Years later, Johansson was reported as saying that she had been cheated out of the title.

Rita Rudolfsson Berntsson, at the 1972 Miss World pageant, created a mild sensation at the luncheon, where she wore a gown which had the flag of Sweden attached to her derrière. The crew were likely much more impressed with top front panel of her gown which barely covered the sides of her breasts. She was told to change the outfit.

Jennifer Palm Lundberg placed third runner-up in the national pageant, but won the title when each of the original top three placers declined the crown. This happened after arguments over the contract for the winner. It was revealed that the original winner was fired when her lawyer suggested her not to sign the contract written by the agency. The first and second runners-up each declined the crown for various reasons.

== Titleholders ==
=== Miss World Sweden ===
Color key

- Declared as Winner
- Ended as runner-up
- Ended as one of the finalists or semifinalists

The Miss World Sweden Organization was created in 2003 to focus more on the Miss World pageant.

Year	Miss World Sweden	Represented	Notes	Special Awards
Miss World Sweden by Hänt Extra
2003	Ida Söfringsgärd	Växjö	Unplaced	
2004	Eva Helena Hjertonsson	Kalmar	Unplaced	
2005	Liza Berggren	Gothenburg	Unplaced	
2006	Cathrin Skoog	Östersund	Unplaced	
2007	Annie Oliv	Gothenburg	Top 5	
2008	Jennifer Palm Lundberg	Sigtuna	Unplaced	
2009	Erica Harrison	Stockholm	Unplaced	
2010	Daniela Karlsson	Stockholm	Unplaced	
2011	Nicoline Artursson	Halmstad	Top 15	
2012	Sanna Jinnedal	Borås	Top 30	Miss World Sport
2013	Agneta Myhrman	Stockholm	Unplaced	
2014	Olivia Asplund	Stockholm	Top 25	Miss World Beach Beauty
2015	Natalia Fogelund	Gothenburg	Unplaced	
2016	Emma Strandberg	Stockholm	Unplaced	
2017	Hanna Haag	Gävle	Top 40	
2018	Amanda Wiberg	Stockholm	Did not compete	
2019	Daniella Lundqvist	Kalmar	Unplaced	
Miss World Sweden by Miss Sweden Organization
2020	Due to the impact of COVID-19 pandemic, no pageant in 2020			
2021	Gabriella Lomm Mann	Stockholm	Unplaced	Miss World Sport (Top 32)
2022	Due to the impact of COVID-19 pandemic, no pageant in 2022			
2023	Stina Nordlander	Kramfors	Unplaced	
2025	Isabelle Åhs	Malmö	Unplaced	
2026	Bianca Lindström	Stockholm	Unplaced	
2027	TBA	TBA	TBA	

== Miss Sweden at Miss World ==
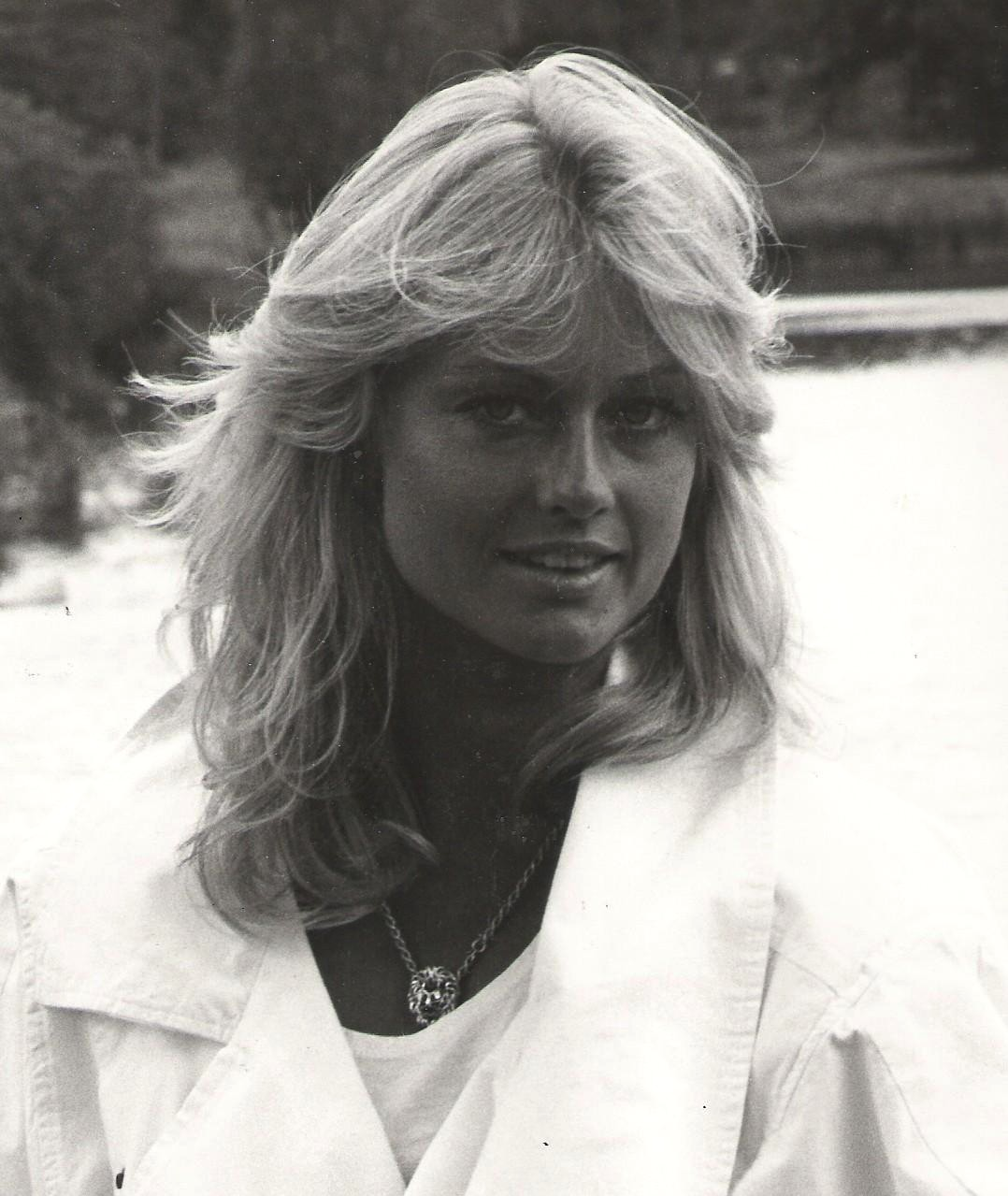
Mary Stävin, 1977 Miss World, in the James Bond- film, A View to a Kill.

Miss Sweden which ran from 1949 to 2003, by the female magazine VeckoRevyn and production company Strix in partnership with MTG.

Year	Miss Sweden	Notes
1951	Kiki Håkansson†	Miss World 1951
1952	May-Louise Flodin†	Miss World 1952
1953	Ingrid Johansson	Unplaced
1954	Margareta Westling	Unplaced
1955	Anita Åstrand	4th Runner-Up
1956	Eva Bränn	4th Runner-Up
1957	Ellenor Edin	Unplaced
1958	Harriett Margareta Wågström	3rd Runner-Up
1959	Carola Håkansson	Unplaced
1960	Barbara Olsson	Unplaced
1961	Ingrid Margareta Lundquist	Unplaced
1962	Margareta Palin	Unplaced
1963	Grethe Qviberg	4th Runner-Up
1964	Agneta Malmberg	Unplaced
1965	Britt Marie Lindberg	Top 15
1966	Ulla Andersson	Unplaced
1967	Eva Englander	Top 15
1968	Gunilla Friden	Top 15
1969	Ingrid Marie Ahlin	Unplaced
1970	Marjorie Christal Johansson	3rd Runner-Up
1971	Simonetta Kohl	Top 15
1972	Rita Rudolfsson Berntsson	Unplaced
1973	Mercy Nilsson	Unplaced
1974	Jill Lindquist	4th Runner-Up
1975	Agneta Catharina Magnusson	Unplaced
1976	Anne Christine Gernandt	Unplaced
1977	Mary Ann Catrin Stävin	Miss World 1977
1978	Ossie Margareta Carlsson	1st Runner-Up
1979	Ingrid Marie Säveby	Unplaced
1980	Kerstin Monica Jernemark	Top 15
1981	Carita Gustafsson	Unplaced
1982	Annelie Margareta Sjöberg	Unplaced
1983	Eva Lisa Törnquist	Unplaced
1984	Madeleine Gunnarsson	Unplaced
1985	Bolette Christophersson	Top 15
1986	Elisabeth Marita Ulvan	Unplaced
1987	Charlotta Trydell	Unplaced
1988	Cecilia Hörberg	Top 15
1989	Lena Berglind	Unplaced
1990	Daniela Maria Jessica Almen	Unplaced
1991	Catrin Olsson	Unplaced
1992	Ulrika Johansson	Unplaced
1993	Victoria Silvstedt	Top 10
1994	Sofia Andersson	Unplaced
1995	Jeanette Hassel	Unplaced
1996	Åsa Johansson	Unplaced
1997	Sofia Joelsson	Unplaced
1998	Jessica Almenäs	Unplaced
1999	Louise Torsvik	Unplaced
2000	Ida Manneh	Unplaced
2001	Camilla Bäck	Unplaced
2002	Sofia Hedmark	Unplaced
2003	Isabelle Jonsson	Disqualified
