= Annie Oliv =

Swedish beauty pageant contestant

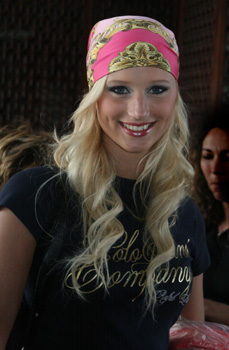
- Annie during Miss World 2007
- Born: Annie Oliv; October 12, 1987 (age 38); Gislaved, Småland, Sweden
- Beauty pageant titleholder
- Title: Miss World Sweden 2007
- Major competitions: Miss World 2007 (Top 5)

Annie Oliv (born October 12, 1987) is a Swedish cellist and beauty pageant titleholder who represented her country and ranked as a top-five finalist in Miss World 2007 held in Sanya, China.

== Career ==
Oliv won Miss World Sweden on September 8, 2007, and was crowned by the host Marie Plosjö. Oliv, representing Gothenburg, succeeded the previous year's winner Cathrin Skoog, who represented Östersund. Oliv completed her upper secondary high school education and one year at the Royal Ballet School. She has worked as a personal assistant for the disabled in Gothenburg.

=== Melodifestivalen 2008 ===
On February 23, 2008, Oliv participated in the Swedish music competition Melodifestivalen 2008, as she played cello during Mickey Huskic entry in semifinal three. They were eliminated in the first round, ending up seventh.

| Preceded by Cathrin Skoog | Miss World Sweden; 2007 | Succeeded by Jennifer Palm Lundberg |
| Preceded by (Czech Republic) Taťána Kuchařová | Miss World Europe; 2007 | Succeeded by (Russia) Ksenia Sukhinova |
