= Berggren =

Berggren is a Swedish surname. Notable people with the surname include:

- Arne Berggren (born 1960), Norwegian author and scriptwright
- Dick Berggren (born 1942), American motorsports announcer and magazine editor
- Emelie Berggren (born 1982), Swedish ice hockey player
- Evy Berggren (1934–2018), Swedish gymnast and Olympic champion
- Gunnar Berggren (1908–1983), Swedish boxer
- Hans Berggren (born 1973), Swedish footballer
- Inger Berggren (1934–2019), Swedish singer
- Jenny Berggren (born 1972), Swedish singer
- Jonas Berggren (born 1967), Swedish singer
- Jonatan Berggren (born 2000), Swedish ice hockey player
- Karl Berggren, American electrical engineer
- Katarina Berggren (born 1968), Swedish politician
- Linn Berggren (born 1970), Swedish singer
- Liza Berggren (born 1986), Swedish fashion model and former dancer
- Niklas Berggren (born 1966), Swedish curler
- Peter Berggren (born 1962), former Swedish Olympic swimmer
- Sven Berggren (1837–1917), Swedish botanist, explorer and university professor
- Thommy Berggren (born 1937), Swedish actor
- Tobias Berggren (1940–2020), Swedish poet
- Tom Berggren, (born 1942), Swedish curler
- Tommy Berggren (1950–2012), Swedish football player
- Wes Berggren (1971–1999), American musician

== See also ==
- Bergren
