= Mary Lou Farrell =

Canadian actress and singer (1942–2011)

- Born: Mary Louise Farrell; November 27, 1942; St. John's, Newfoundland
- Died: October 20, 2011 (aged 68); Temple Terrace, Florida
- Other name: Aniko Farrell
- Spouse: Peter Palmer (m. 1966)
- Children: 1
- Beauty pageant titleholder
- Title: Miss Dominion of Canada 1964
- Major competitions: Miss Dominion of Canada 1964 (winner); Miss Universe 1964; Miss World 1964; Miss International 1965

Mary Louise Farrell Palmer (November 27, 1942 – October 20, 2011), known professionally as Aniko Farrell, was a Canadian singer, actress and beauty pageant titleholder who won Miss Dominion of Canada.

Farrell was one of nine children born to Arthur and Elizabeth Farrell in St. John's, Newfoundland. She was educated at Holy Heart of Mary Regional High School and started to sing at an early age. She won several awards at the Kiwanis Music Festival. In 1964 Farrell was voted Miss Newfoundland and won Miss Dominion of Canada later that same year. She went on to enter the Miss World contest where she was the runner-up.

Farrell made guest appearances on The Lawrence Welk Show and was offered a contract to appear regularly on the show. She used her stage name Aniko when performing in Broadway musicals. It was there in 1966 where she met Peter Palmer, whom she married later that year in Los Angeles. The couple had a daughter, Farrell Beth, and lived in Florida until her death in 2011.

== See also ==
- List of people of Newfoundland and Labrador

Preceded by Jane Kmita	Miss World Canada; 1964	Succeeded by Carol Ann Tidey
