= Jacquie Perrin =

- Born: Jacquie Perrin; 1949 (age 76–77); Toronto, Ontario, Canada
- Education: York University
- Occupations: television host, news anchor
- Beauty pageant titleholder
- Title: Miss Dominion of Canada 1969
- Hair colour: Blonde
- Major competitions: Miss Dominion of Canada 1969 (winner); Miss Universe 1969; Miss World 1969; Miss International 1970; Queen of the Pacific

Jacquie Perrin (born c. 1949) is a Canadian journalist and beauty pageant titleholder. She was host of the CBC's Saturday Report and is current host of the Sunday 5:00 p.m. edition of CBC News: Today on CBC Newsworld. Her broadcast career began at CKWS radio in Kingston, Ontario where she hosted a daily TV talk show. She also put her geography degree from York University to good use as the local weather reporter. Jacquie was selected Miss Dominion of Canada in 1969 and represented Canada at the Miss Universe, Miss World, Miss International, and Queen of the Pacific pageants. She is also an accomplished pilot.

Preceded by Nancy Wilson	Miss World Canada, Miss Dominion of Canada; 1969	Succeeded by Norma Joyce Hickey
