= Marie Plosjö =

Swedish model

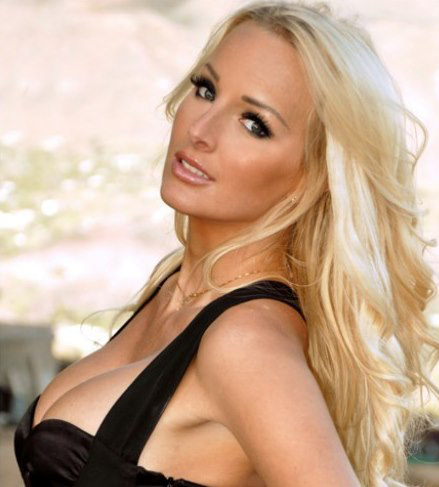
Marie Plosjö

Cindy Marie Helene Plosjö (born 30 June 1976 in Bjuv, Sweden) is a Swedish model for magazines such as Cafe, Moore and Slitz. She has also been in Playboy as well as ICE magazines. She has posed for some pictures which may be classified as nudes. In 2005 she was a contestant in season 2 of the reality show Paradise Hotel where she ended up in a fight over David Lotfi with her former friend and also model Natacha Peyre. Marie Plosjö has also released a single called "Boom boom boom". In 2008 she continued her modelling career, and was host for the final of Miss World Sweden 2007 and 2008. She is CEO of a big blogportal in Sweden, and she is an artist with exhibitions around the world.
