= Dani Karlsson =

Swedish model and beauty queen

- Born: Daniela Chelsea Chatarina Karlsson; Malmö, Sweden
- Height: 1.72 m (5 ft 7 1/2 in)
- Beauty pageant titleholder
- Title: Miss World Sweden
- Hair color: Dark
- Eye color: Blue/Green
- Major competitions: Miss World Sweden (winner); Miss World Top Model (top 20); Miss World 2010

Daniela Chelsea Chatarina "Dani" Karlsson is a Swedish beauty pageant titleholder and model who won Miss World Sweden 2010 and represented Sweden at Miss World 2010 on 30 October in China. Karlsson was called in on the same day as the pageant finale as one of the other contestants decided to back out of the pageant. Karlsson appeared in the music video for Darin's single "Lovekiller". She was said to be romantically linked with former Idol judge Andreas Carlsson.
