= Peter Palmer (actor) =

American actor (1931–2021)

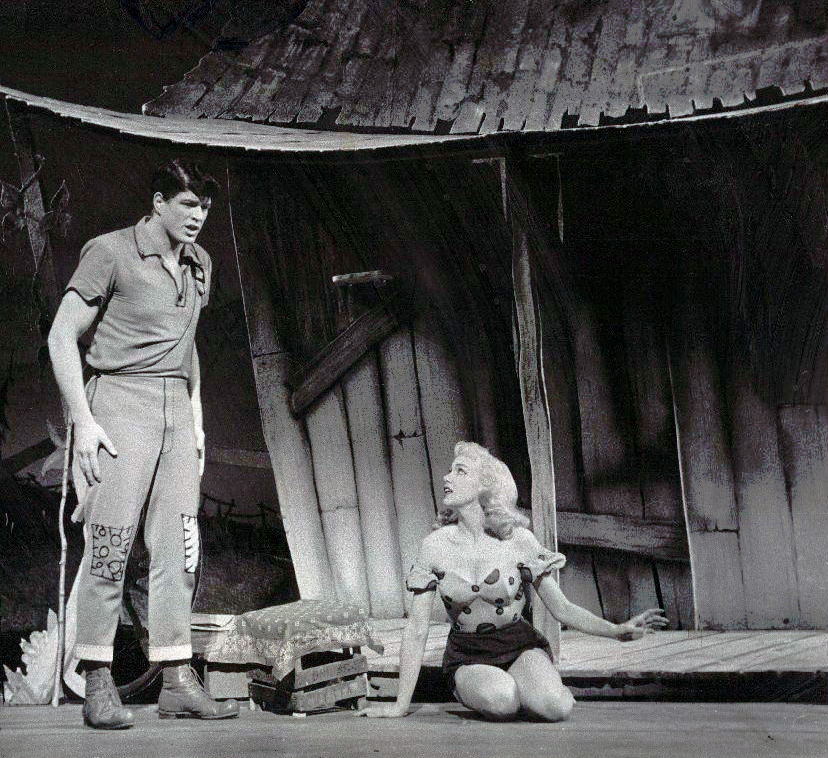
- Palmer as Li'l Abner and Edie Adams as Daisy Mae, 1956.
- Born: Peter Webster Palmer; September 20, 1931; Milwaukee, Wisconsin, U.S.
- Died: September 21, 2021 (aged 90); Tampa, Florida, U.S.
- Occupation: Actor
- Years active: 1956–1990s
- Spouses: Jackie Palmer (m. 1954; div. 1964) Mary Lou Farrell (m. 1966; died 2011)
- Children: 7

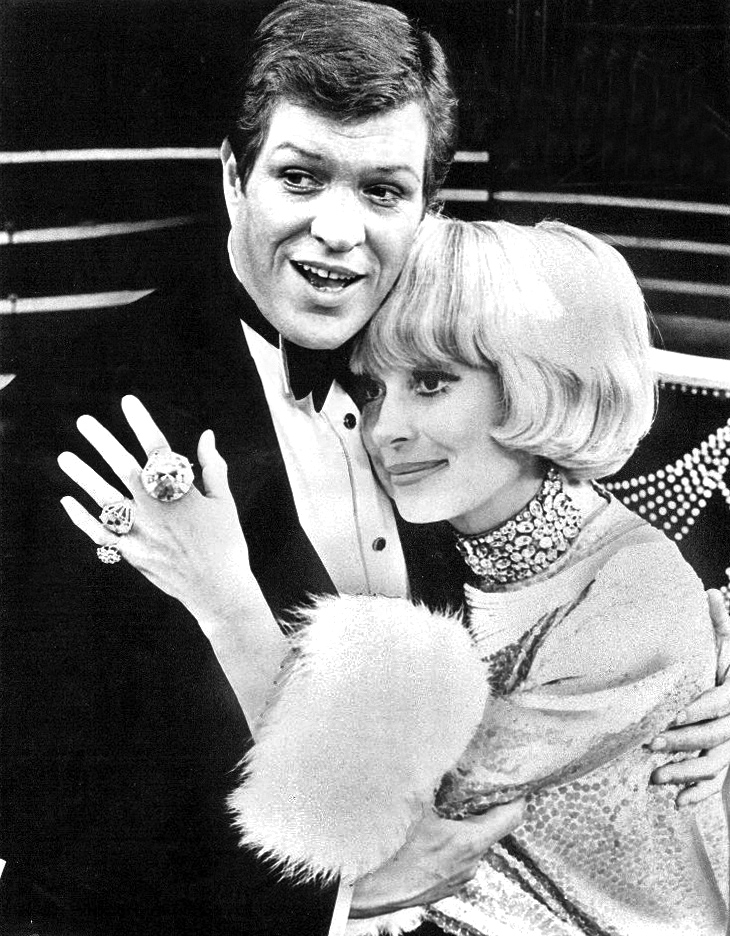
Peter Palmer and Carol Channing in Lorelei on Broadway (1974)

Peter Webster Palmer (September 20, 1931 – September 21, 2021) was an American actor best known for his portrayal of Li'l Abner, alongside Edie Adams, both on Broadway and on film.

== Life and career ==
Palmer was born on September 20, 1931, in Milwaukee, Wisconsin. He attended the University of Illinois at Urbana-Champaign.

In 1956, Palmer was cast in the title role of the musical Li'l Abner, for which he won a Theatre World Award. Having won a singing contest while in the U.S. Army, he was rewarded with an appearance on The Ed Sullivan Show, where he sang "Granada". The producers of the musical, Melvin Frank and Norman Panama, happened to spot him on the Sullivan show and sought out to hire him immediately. In 1959, he was cast in the same role in the movie version. His Li'l Abner role brought him a guest appearance on The Ford Show (starring Tennessee Ernie Ford).

Palmer said that he tired of the Li'l Abner role after six months of the show's 22-month run. "It stamped me so definitely as a hillbilly type," he said, "that everything else I was offered afterward was in a similar vein". He tried to alter that image by singing in night clubs and making recordings of his singing in operettas.

In 1967, Palmer had a recurring role as Sergeant James Bustard, a former Confederate States of America soldier in the short-lived series Custer. Throughout the 1960s, 1970s, and 1980s, Palmer appeared on numerous television episodes, including small parts on Dallas, M*A*S*H, and Emergency! He appeared on Broadway with Carol Channing in Lorelei in 1974. In 1977, he had a regular role as part of the cast on the short-lived sitcom The Kallikaks, playing Oscar Heinz.

== Personal life ==
In 1954, Palmer married his first wife, Jackalee Ann "Jackie" Gleason; they divorced in 1964. In 1966, he married Mary Lou "Aniko" Farrell Palmer. He had 7 children: with his first wife, Jackie, he had 5 (Sherri, Scott, Kathy, Mike, and Steven); with his second wife, Aniko, he had a daughter, Farrell Beth; Palmer had a son, Jack, from a previous relationship.

== Death ==
Palmer died in Shelbyville, KY on September 21, 2021, the day after his 90th birthday.

== Filmography ==
Year	Title	Role	Notes
1959	Li'l Abner	Li'l Abner Yokum	
1988	Deep Space	Pike	
1988	A Time of Destiny	Policeman	
1990	Edward Scissorhands	Editor	
