= Sanna Jinnedal =

Swedish model

- Born: Sanna Jinnedal; 25 April 1993 (age 33); Borås, Sweden
- Occupation: Model (profession)
- Beauty pageant titleholder
- Title: Miss World Sweden 2012
- Years active: 2012–present
- Hair color: Blonde
- Eye color: Blue
- Major competitions: Miss World Sweden 2012 (Winner); Miss World 2012 (Top 30)

Sanna Jinnedal (born 25 April 1993 in Borås) is a Swedish model and beauty titleholder. Jinnedal was crowned Miss World Sweden 2012 and represented Sweden at Miss World 2012 in China, placing amongst the Top 30 and she also became Miss World Sportswoman 2012. She additionally represented Sweden at Miss Pearl of Europe 2012 on Cyprus and placed second runner-up.
