= Jennifer Palm Lundberg =

Swedish model

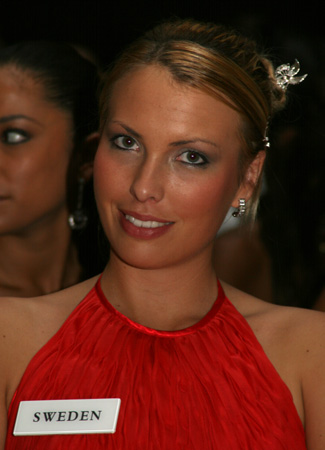
- Lundberg in 2008
- Born: 28 April 1986 (age 39); Sigtuna, Stockholm County, Sweden
- Height: 1.76 m (5 ft 9 in)
- Beauty pageant titleholder
- Title: Miss World Sweden 2008
- Hair color: Gold/Brown
- Eye color: Green

Jennifer Palm Lundberg (born 28 April 1986 in Sigtuna, Stockholm County, Sweden) is a Swedish model and beauty pageant titleholder who won Miss World Sweden 2008 and represented Sweden in Miss World 2008, in Johannesburg, South Africa.

== Biography ==
Lundberg placed third runner-up in the Miss World Sweden pageant, but claimed the title when the original winner, Amanda Ulfdotter, was fired and the first and second runners-up declined the crown after arguments over the winning contract.

Lundberg decided during her reign as Miss World Sweden to work with charities concerning anorexia nervosa and bulimia with plans to help the Swedish Animal Protection Service.

She speaks Swedish, English, Norwegian and Spanish.

Preceded by Annie Oliv	Miss World Sweden; 2008	Succeeded by -
