= Agneta Myhrman =

Swedish beauty queen (born 1994)

Agneta Myhrman Lilliesköld (born 11 November 1994) is a Swedish model and beauty pageant titleholder who was crowned Miss World Sweden 2013 and represented Sweden at Miss World 2013 in Bali, Indonesia.

Myhrman was born and lives in Stockholm.
