= Bergren =

Bergren is a surname, variant of Berggren. Notable people with the surname include:

- Bob Bergren, American politician, Montana state legislator 2002–present
- Eric Bergren (1954–2016), American screenwriter
- Ann Bergren (1942–2018), professor

== See also ==
- Berggren
