= Lorelei (musical) =

1974 American musical

- 2003 Decca combined cast recordings release
- Music: Jule Styne
- Lyrics: Adolph Green and Betty Comden (new songs) Leo Robin (songs from Gentlemen Prefer Blondes)
- Book: Kenny Solms and Gail Parent
- Basis: Gentlemen Prefer Blondes
- Productions: 1974 Broadway

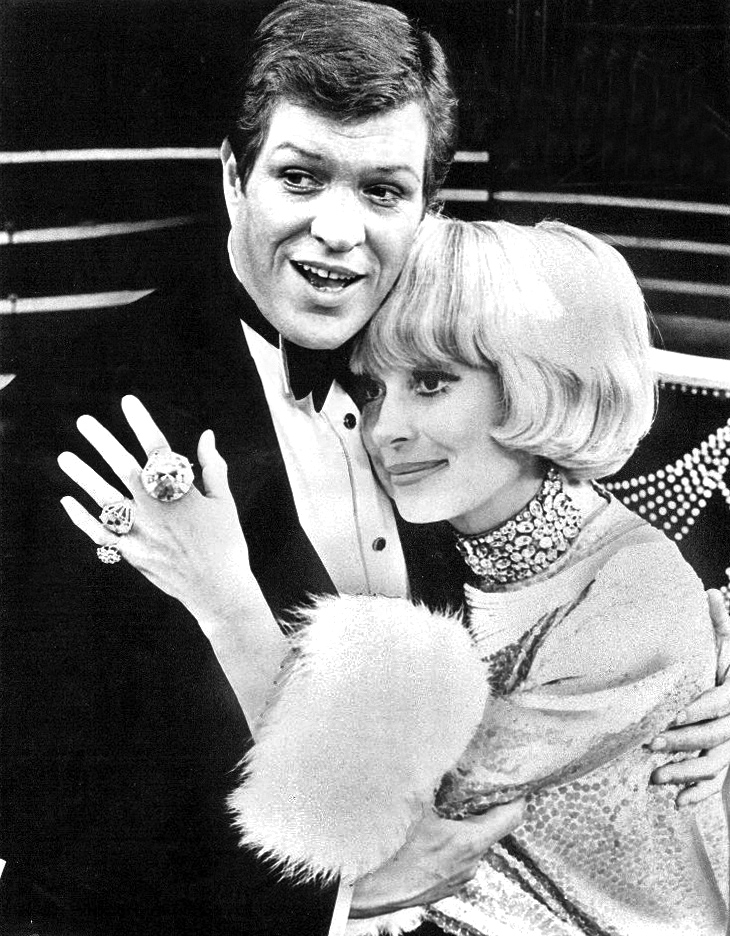
Peter Palmer and Carol Channing

Lorelei is a musical with a book by Kenny Solms and Gail Parent, lyrics by Betty Comden and Adolph Green, and music by Jule Styne. It is a revision of the Joseph Fields-Anita Loos book for the 1949 production Gentlemen Prefer Blondes and includes many of the Jule Styne-Leo Robin songs written for the original.

The 1974 Broadway production of Lorelei, directed by Robert Moore and starring Carol Channing, ran for 320 performances.

== Synopsis ==
Subtitled Gentlemen Still Prefer Blondes, it opens with the title character, a heavily-bejeweled, very wealthy widow, about to set sail on the SS Ile de France. The moment reminds her of a past voyage she took with her best friend and fellow showgirl Dorothy Shaw, and in a flashback we relive their madcap adventures after Lorelei's plans to marry Gus Esmond are derailed by his father and the two women sail from New York City to Paris and settle in at the Hôtel Ritz.

== Productions ==
In 1973 Carol Channing, who had originated the role of Lorelei Lee in 1949, reprised her role when Lorelei premiered in Oklahoma City at the Civic Center Music Hall and broke box office records after six straight days of performances sold out within 24 hours. Lorelei then toured the country for nearly a year and earned a tidy profit. According to Steven Suskin, writing in Playbill, "Channing did great business in some places, and only so-so in others; the star pleased audiences, by and large, but the show didn't. If the show had impressive grosses along the way, it also had outsized costs as they added songs and threw out songs along the way."

The musical opened on Broadway at the Palace Theatre on January 27, 1974, following 11 previews and closed on November 3, 1974 after 321 performances. The musical was directed by Robert Moore, with choreography by Ernest Flatt and costumes by Alvin Colt. The cast featured Tamara Long as Dorothy and Peter Palmer as Gus, with Brandon Maggart, Dody Goodman, and Lee Roy Reams. Carol Channing was nominated for the 1974 Tony Award for Best Actress in a Musical.

In her review in Time, Martha Duffy described the show as "a particularly tawdry retread . . . The book, which always had the flaw of seeming more heartless than its heroine, now seems just plain crass." Of its star, she noted, "Channing, who is now 51, looks much too old for the part . . . Instead of throwing herself into the proceedings, Carol seems to expend her energy with utmost calculation . . . she remains almost stationary and is offstage altogether for the strenuous tap-dance sequences."

== Song list ==
Act I

- Overture (1974 Broadway Version)
- Looking Back
- Bye, Bye Baby (from Gentlemen Prefer Blondes)
- It's High Time (from Gentlemen)
- A Little Girl from Little Rock (from Gentlemen)
- I'm A'Tingle, I'm A'Glow
- I Love What I'm Doing (from Gentlemen)
- It's Delightful Down in Chile (from Gentlemen)
- Paris, Paris
- I Won't Let You Get Away
- Keeping Cool With Coolidge (from Gentlemen)
- Men

Act II

- Coquette (from Gentlemen)
- Mamie is Mimi (from Gentlemen)
- Diamonds Are a Girl's Best Friend (from Gentlemen)
- Lorelei
- Homesick Blues (from Gentlemen)
- Just a Kiss Apart
- "Looking Back"… on… "Diamonds"
- Button Up With Esmond (from Gentlemen)
- Diamonds Are a Girl's Best Friend (Reprise)
- Overture (1973 Tour Version)

== Recordings ==
The show's cast album was recorded on February 18, 1973 prior to the tryout tour. During eleven months on the road, songs were discarded and new ones added, so when the show reached New York City, it was decided to make a new recording on March 1, 1974. In 2003, Decca Broadway combined the two recordings, resulting in a definitive cast recording that includes all the songs from both.
