= Alan Haven =

English jazz organist (1935–2016)

Alan Haven (1 April 1935 – 7 January 2016), born in Prestwich, Lancashire, United Kingdom, was an English jazz organist. His original name was Alan Halpern and he was Jewish. He lived off Kings Road and attended Kings Road School, Prestwich.

He was known for his collaborations with John Barry in the James Bond films From Russia with Love (1963) and Goldfinger (1964), the comedy film A Jolly Bad Fellow (1964), and in the Richard Lester film The Knack …and How to Get It (1965). He released a single from the Lester film, but is perhaps best known for the single Image in 1965 (originally recorded by The Hank Levine Orchestra), which was frequently used as a theme tune on the offshore radio station Radio Caroline and also featured in the 1965 horror film The Night Caller. His early work was performed on a Lowrey organ.

When Barry decided to adapt his own Oscar-winning theme from the 1968 medieval drama The Lion in Winter as a single, he wrote an extended solo for organ with Haven in mind. As released, the jazz adaptation marks a notable departure from the soundtrack score which featured a choir singing in Latin.

Haven also released several albums in the 1960s and 1970s, initially on Fontana Records, then CBS Records including a recording of a live set at Ronnie Scott's in London. A 1966 album, Live at Annie's Room (recorded at Annie Ross's eponymous club) featured one of several collaborations with drummer Tony Crombie. Haven's friend Spike Milligan contributed the album notes for the 1971 release St. Elmo's Fire.

Alan Haven’s performance of “A Hard Day’s Night” on the 1965 British TV special The Music of Lennon & McCartney is one of the standout instrumental moments of the show — and one of the few times a Beatles song was presented in a modern jazz organ style on national television in the ’60s.

Haven was married to 1965 Miss World winner Lesley Langley in the 1960s and they had one daughter.

Mal Jefferson, record producer, writes:

In 1991, Rudi Mancini the owner of Blackpool's Queens Hotel south shore saw Alan performing in a bar/ nightclub in Manchester. Alan was working as a duo with Karen Elle, a beautiful blonde beauty queen (she was the current Miss Anglia), who was also a very fine jazz singer. The act was called Haven and Elle.

Rudi asked Alan and Karen to come and do a season at his hotel when his contract there finished. The hotel had a cabaret lounge and also a large ballroom. They duly came over and did a very successful season there as well as gigs at other local venues. My company, Mastersound, remastered and re-released three of his previous albums on cassette for Alan to sell. They were 'Organ Show', 'Images' and 'Collector's Item'.

Local musicians, including Eric Delaney, organised a big band night featuring Alan, and they performed a full version of 'Image' in a large local venue (The Yellow Submarine), which we recorded, but never released, due to contractual difficulties with the large orchestra. Also, Alan and Karen produced four albums with us which were – 'Two', 'Day By Day', 'Libra' and 'By The Seaside' which was released in 1992.

After the season, Alan and Karen lived in Longridge for some years with Kenny Baker (English actor) ( (R2-D2 from Star Wars), who was also a local cabaret star.
