= May-Louise Flodin =

Swedish model and Miss World 1952 (1934–2011)

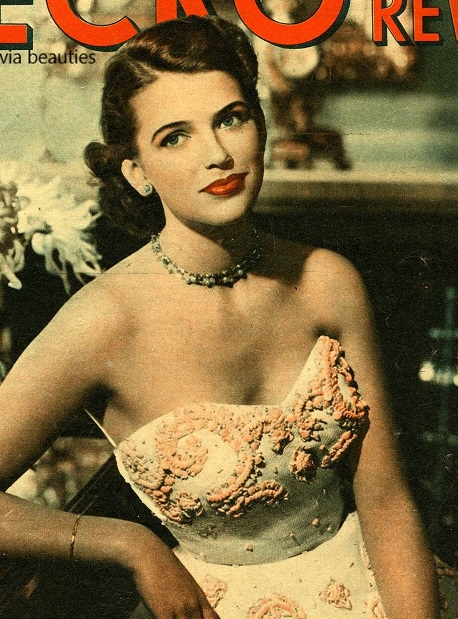
- Born: May-Louise Frances Flodin; 5 September 1934; Stockholm, Sweden
- Died: 4 February 2011 (aged 76); Stockholm, Sweden
- Occupations: beauty queen and model
- Children: 3
- Beauty pageant titleholder
- Title: Miss World Sweden 1952
- Hair color: Light brown
- Eye color: Blue
- Major competitions: Miss World Sweden 1952 (Winner); Miss World 1952 (Winner)

May-Louise Flodin (5 September 1934 – 4 February 2011) was a Swedish model and beauty queen who won the Miss World 1952. She was the second winner and was crowned by her predecessor Kiki Håkansson also from Sweden.

Awards and achievements
Preceded by (Sweden) Kiki Håkansson	Miss World; 1952	Succeeded by (France) Denise Perrier
Preceded by Kiki Håkansson	Miss World Sweden; 1952	Succeeded by Ingrid Johansson
