= Kiki Håkansson =

Swedish model and first Miss World winner (1929–2024)

- Håkansson in 1951
- Born: Kerstin Margareta Håkansson; 23 July 1929; Stockholm, Sweden
- Died: 4 November 2024 (aged 95); California, U.S.
- Occupations: beauty queen and model
- Spouse: Dallas Anderson
- Children: 3
- Beauty pageant titleholder
- Title: Miss Sweden 1951; Miss World 1951
- Hair color: Light brown
- Eye color: Blue
- Major competitions: Miss World Sweden 1951 (Winner); Miss World 1951 (Winner)

Kerstin Margareta "Kiki" Håkansson (23 July 1929 – 4 November 2024) was a Swedish model and beauty queen who was the first winner of the Miss World beauty pageant.

== Miss World 1951 ==
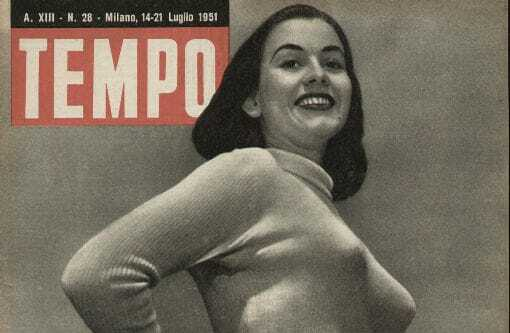
Håkansson on the cover of Tempo magazine

Originally the Festival Bikini Contest, Miss World was organized by Eric Morley as a mid-century advertisement for swimwear at the Festival of Britain. Håkansson was a photo and fashion model when she was crowned Miss Sweden World in 1951 and subsequently won the London pageant.

Håkansson wore a bikini during the crowning ritual, after which she was condemned by Pope Pius XII and some countries with strong religious traditions threatened to withdraw delegates. In 1952, bikinis were banned from the pageant and replaced with more modest swimwear. While they were eventually reintroduced to Miss World, Håkansson remains the only winner to have received her crown while wearing one.

== Later life ==
Håkansson declined an Italian film contract and an American modelling contract and continued her modelling career in Europe, working for the Comité français de l'élégance. She studied French couture sewing, and judged several beauty pageants. She married Dallas Anderson, an American sculptor whom she met when he was studying in Europe; after nine years in Copenhagen, they moved to the United States, where Håkansson retired from modelling and Anderson became a faculty member at Brigham Young University in Utah.

== Personal life and death ==
Håkansson and her husband had three children. She died in her sleep on 4 November 2024 in California, at the age of 95.

Awards and achievements
New title	Miss World; 1951	Succeeded by (Sweden) May-Louise Flodin
New title	Miss World Sweden; 1951	Succeeded by May-Louise Flodin
