= Liza Berggren =

Swedish model (born 1986)

- Born: 6 February 1986 (age 39); Mölndal, Sweden
- Occupation: fashion model
- Beauty pageant titleholder
- Title: Miss World Sweden 2005

Liza Berggren (born 6 February 1986 in Mölndal, Sweden) is a Swedish fashion model and beauty pageant titleholder who won Miss World Sweden 2005.

== Career ==
In 2005, she was the Swedish delegate at 2005 Miss World pageant, held in Sanya, China, after winning Miss World Sweden. Afterward, Berggren decided to become a fashion model. Berggren started her modeling career with Avenue Modeller. Under Avenue Modeller, she began to modeling other cities such as Milan, Copenhagen and Berlin.

Berggren is predominantly an editorial model who has been featured in magazines such as Numero Magazine, Zink, Cosmopolitan Magazine, Viktor Magazine, and Love. She has appeared on the cover of Henne magazine in Norway and was the face of Kristian Aadnevik in the Spring of 2011. Berggren has landed campaigns with AnneKarine, Farzan Esfahani, Carlings, Bjorklund, Christopher Kane, and P2 Summer.
