= Miss World 1965 =

15th Miss World pageant

- Lesley Langley
- Date: 19 November 1965
- Presenters: David Jacobs; Michael Aspel
- Venue: Lyceum Ballroom, London, United Kingdom
- Broadcaster: BBC
- Entrants: 48
- Placements: 16
- Debuts: Costa Rica; Gambia; Malta; Syria
- Withdrawals: Aruba; Montserrat; Nicaragua; Portugal; Republic of China; Spain; Turkey
- Returns: Australia; Bolivia; Cyprus; French Polynesia; Israel; Jordan; Malaysia; Peru; Rhodesia
- Winner: Lesley Langley; United Kingdom

Miss World 1965 was the 15th edition of the Miss World pageant, held at the Lyceum Ballroom in London, United Kingdom on 19 November 1965.

At the end of the event, Ann Sidney of the United Kingdom crowned Lesley Langley of the United Kingdom as Miss World 1965. It was the United Kingdom's third victory, and the second time in the history of the pageant that two contestants from the same country won consecutively. Dianna Lynn Batts of the United States finished as first runner-up, while Gladys Anne Waller of Ireland finished as second runner-up.

Contestants from forty-eight countries and territories participated in this pageant. David Jacobs and Michael Aspel hosted the pageant.

== Background ==
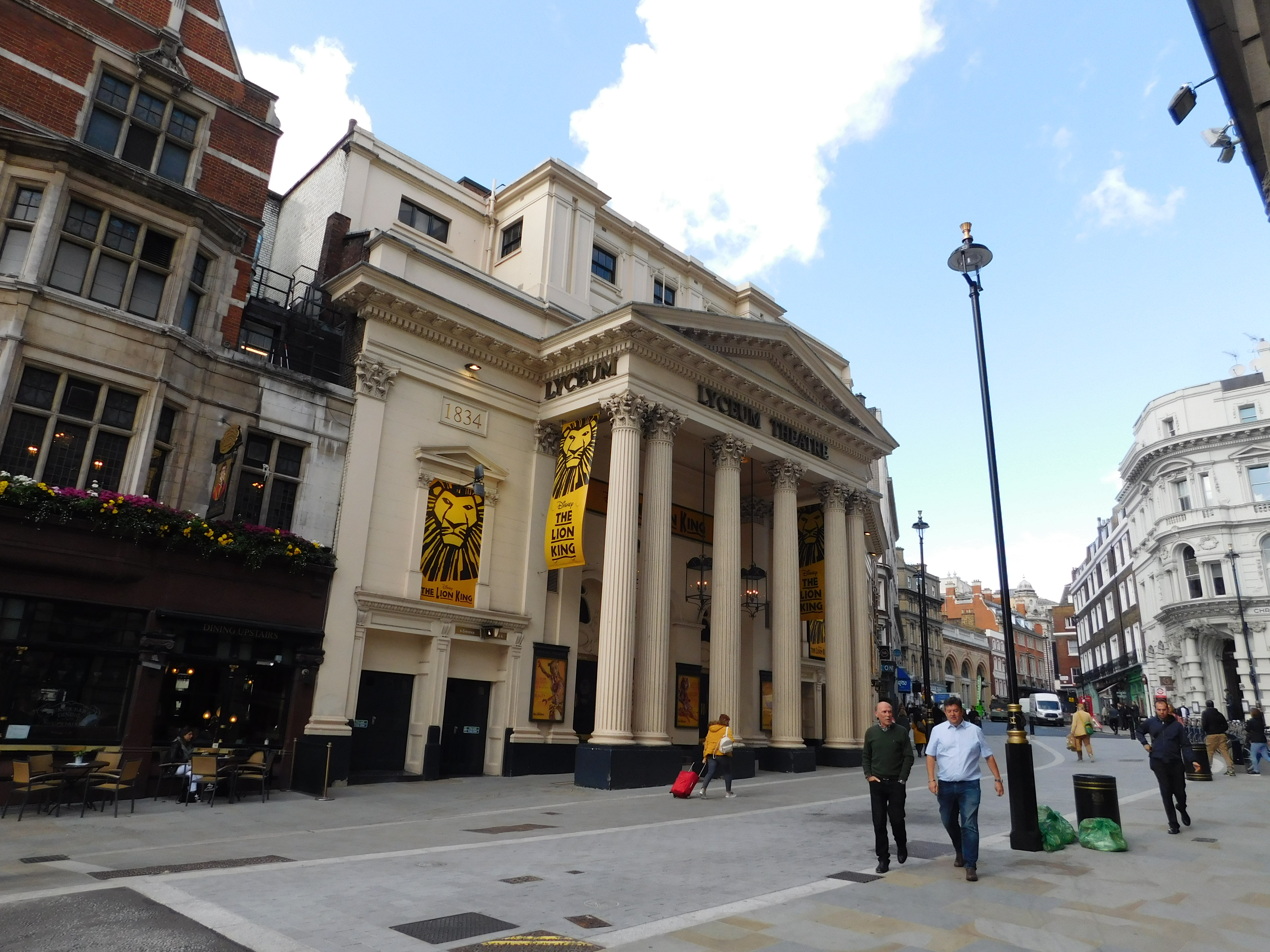
Lyceum Ballroom, the location of Miss World 1965

=== Selection of participants ===
Participants from forty-eight countries and territories were chosen to compete in the pageant. Five contestants were appointed to represent their countries/territories after placing as runners-up in their national pageants, or were selected through a casting process, and one contestant was appointed after the original delegate withdrew.

==== Replacements ====
Miss Italy 1965 Alba Rigazzi was originally scheduled to compete in this edition. However, she was replaced by Guya Libraro due to undisclosed reasons.

==== Debuts, returns, and withdrawals ====
The countries of Costa Rica, Gambia, Malta, and Syria competed for the first time. Returning to this edition were Australia and Tahiti, which both last competed in 1960; Rhodesia, which last competed in 1961, as Rhodesia and Nyasaland; and Bolivia, Cyprus, Israel, Jordan, Malaysia, and Peru, which all last competed in 1963.

Aruba, Montserrat, Nicaragua, Spain, and Turkey did not compete in this edition. Alicia Angela Yarzagaray of Aruba did not compete due to undisclosed reasons. Alicia Borrás of Spain voluntarily withdrew from the competition due to her opposition to the participation of Rosemarie Viňales of Gibraltar amidst the dispute between the United Kingdom and Spain over the territory of Gibraltar. Rose Willock of Montserrat did not compete due to a lack of funds to send Willock to London. Flora Sánchez Arguello of Nicaragua and Zerrin Arbas of Turkey did not compete because they failed to arrive on time.

Sylvia Elaine Simons of Bermuda, Anna Eboweime of Nigeria, and Maria do Carmo Paraíso Sancho of Portugal were also scheduled to compete in this edition, but ultimately did not proceed due to undisclosed reasons. Azira Febrianti Wicaksono of Indonesia did not proceed with the competition due to her country's conservative Islamic views and protests by conservative Muslims against her participation. Ana Elena Noreña of Mexico also did not proceed with the competition after breaking her arm. Thai Kim Huong of Vietnam did not proceed with participation due to a lack of funds to bring her to London.

== Results ==
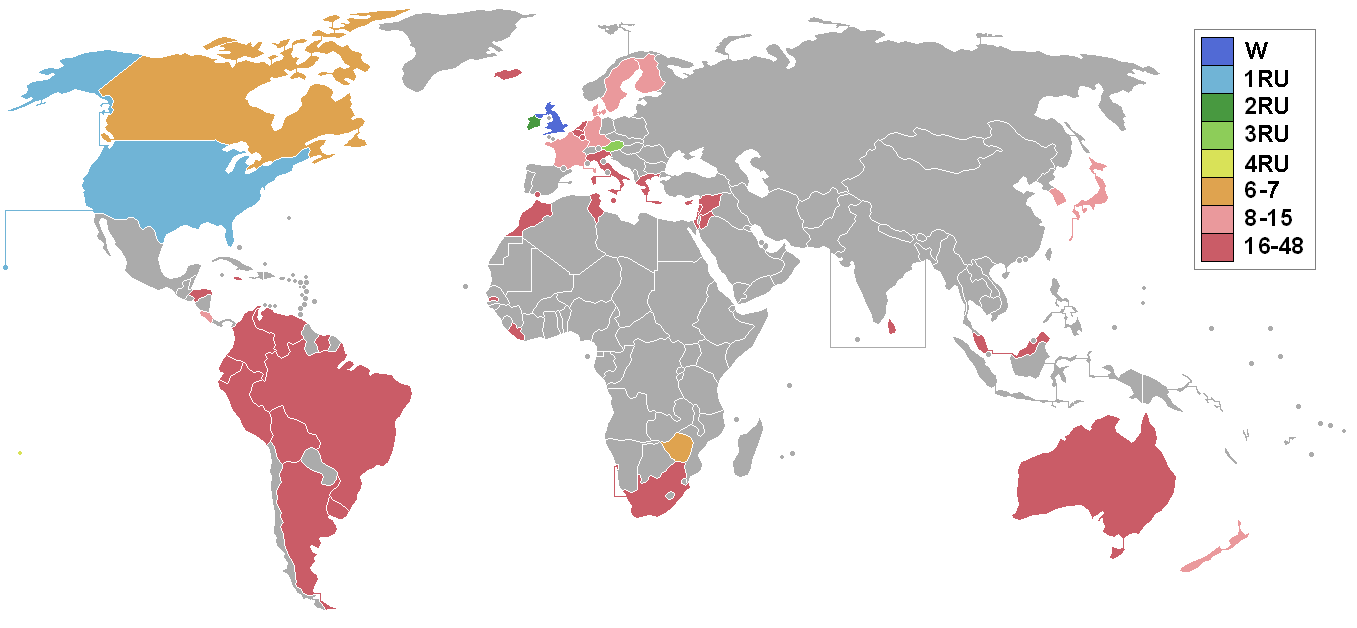
Countries and territories which participated in Miss World 1965 and their placements.

=== Placements ===
Placement	Contestant
Miss World 1965	United Kingdom – Lesley Langley
1st runner-up	United States – Dianna Lynn Batts
2nd runner-up	(Republic of Ireland) Ireland – Gladys Anne Waller
3rd runner-up	Austria – Ingrid Kopetzky
4th runner-up	French Polynesia – Marie Tapare
Top 7	Canada – Carol Ann Tidey; Rhodesia – Lesley Bunting
Top 16	Costa Rica – Marta Eugenia Escalante; Denmark – Yvonne Ekman; Finland – Raija Salminen; France – Christiane Sibellin; Germany – Karin Schütze; Japan – Yuko Oguchi; New Zealand – Gay Lorraine Phelps; South Korea – Lee Eun-ah; Sweden – Britt-Marie Lindblad

== Pageant ==
=== Format ===
As in 1961, fifteen semi-finalists were chosen through a preliminary competition held on the day of the final competition, which consisted of the swimsuit and evening gown competitions. However, because two contestants tied in score for the fifteenth spot, Morley decided to include both of them, making it sixteen semi-finalists advancing in the competition. The sixteen semi-finalists competed in the swimsuit competition and evening gown competition, and seven finalists were subsequently chosen to compete in the final interview.

=== Selection committee ===
- Stanley Baker – English actor
- Donald Malcolm Campbell – English racecar driver
- Martine Carol – French actress
- Sir Learie Constantine – High Commissioner of Trinidad to the United Kingdom
- Broderick Crawford – American actor
- Fatehsinghrao Prataprao Gaekwad – Maharaja of Baroda
- Suzanna Leigh – English actress
- Johnny Mathis – American singer
- Henrietta Tiarks – Marchioness of Tavistock

== Contestants ==
Forty-eight contestants competed for the title.

Country/Territory	Contestant	Age (Note: Ages at the time of the pageant)	Hometown
Argentina	Lidia Díaz	20	Buenos Aires
Australia	Jan Rennison	20	Sydney
Austria	Ingrid Kopetzky	21	Vienna
Belgium	Lucy Nossent	21	Brussels
Bolivia	Gabriela Cornel Kempff	19	Santa Cruz de la Sierra
Brazil	Berenice Lunardi	18	Minas Gerais
Canada	Carol Ann Tidey	18	Ancaster
(Sri Lanka) Ceylon	Shirlene De Silva	19	Colombo
Colombia	Nubia Angelina Bustillo Gallo	19	El Carmen de Bolívar
Costa Rica	Marta Eugenia Escalante	20	Puntarenas
Cyprus	Krystalia Psara	17	Nicosia
Denmark	Yvonne Ekman	20	Copenhagen
Ecuador	Corine Mirguett Corral	18	Pichincha
Finland	Raija Salminen	19	Helsinki
France	Christiane Sibellin	23	Lyon
French Polynesia	Marie Tapare	20	Papeete
(The Gambia) Gambia	Ndey Jagne	18	Banjul
Germany	Karin Schütze	25	Berlin
Gibraltar	Rosemarie Viňales	18	Gibraltar
Greece	Maria Geka	26	Athens
Honduras	Edda Inés Mungula	20	Francisco Morazán
Iceland	Sigrún Vignisdóttir	17	Reykjavík
(Republic of Ireland) Ireland	Gladys Anne Waller	21	Dublin
Israel	Shlomit Gat	19	–
Italy	Guya Libraro	18	Campania
Jamaica	Carol McFarlane	18	Montego Bay
Japan	Yuko Oguchi	20	Urawa
Jordan	Nyla Haddad	–	Amman
Lebanon	Yolla Harb	18	Beirut
Liberia	Melvilla Harris	17	Monrovia
Luxembourg	Marie-Anne Geisen	18	Luxembourg City
Malaysia	Clara Eunice de Run	20	Selangor
Malta	Wilhelmina Mallia	19	Valletta
Morocco	Lucette Garcia	19	Rabat
Netherlands	Janny de Knegt	20	Amsterdam
New Zealand	Gay Lorraine Phelps	21	Auckland
Peru	Lourdes Cárdenas	18	Arequipa
Rhodesia	Lesley Bunting	21	Salisbury
South Africa	Carol Davis	22	–
South Korea	Lee Eun-ah	20	Seoul
Suriname	Anita van Eyck	18	Paramaribo
Sweden	Britt Lindblad	21	Gothenburg
Syria	Raymonde Doucco	27	Damascus
Tunisia	Zeineb Lamine	–	Istanbul
United Kingdom	Lesley Langley	21	Bayswater
United States	Dianna Lynn Batts	19	Falls Church
Uruguay	Raquel Luz Delgado	22	Montevideo
Venezuela	Nancy González	21	Anzoátegui
