= Lesley Langley =

British model, actress, and beauty queen

- Langley in 1965
- Born: Lesley Doreen Hill; 26 March 1944 (age 82); Weymouth, Dorset, England
- Occupations: Actress; dental practice assistant
- Spouse: Alan Haven (divorced)
- Children: 1

Lesley Doreen Langley (born 26 March 1944, with the name Lesley Hill, which she changed to Leslie Langley to make it more artistic) is a British actress, model and beauty queen who was crowned Miss World 1965 she previously was crowned Miss United Kingdom 1965. She became the third woman from her country to win the title, and the second Miss United Kingdom in a row, thus making the United Kingdom the second country to have back-to-back winners. Sweden was the first, winning the inaugural pageant in 1951 and the second pageant in 1952.

== Career ==
Langley attended the Royal Merchant Navy School—now known as Reddam House, Berkshire—in the 1950s.

In the mid-1960s she played a small part as a member of an all-female team of pilots in the James Bond film Goldfinger as well as a Thal in the Doctor Who serial The Daleks.

She also became the front cover in 1967 on Weymouth's Official Holiday Guide, with photos inside.

== Personal life ==
During her tenure Langley met and married jazz organist Alan Haven—known for his collaborations with John Barry in the James Bond films From Russia with Love and Goldfinger—and they had one daughter named Chloë. They divorced and Lesley later worked as a dental practice assistant.

Awards and achievements
Preceded by (United Kingdom) Ann Sidney	Miss World; 1965	Succeeded by (India) Reita Faria
Preceded by Ann Sidney	Miss United Kingdom; 1965	Succeeded by Jennifer Lowe Summers
