= Miss World 1952 =

2nd Miss World pageant

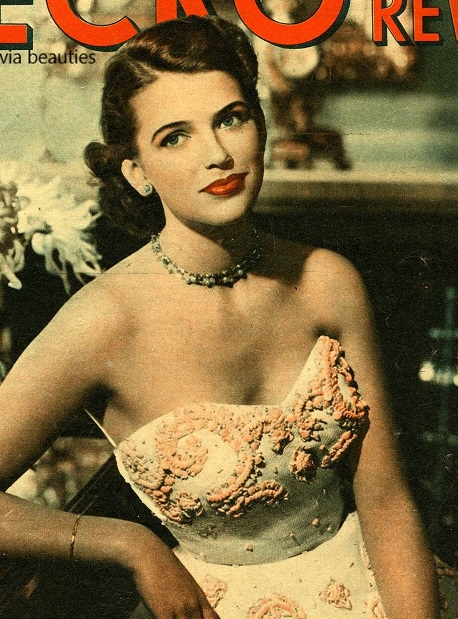
- May-Louise Flodin
- Date: 14 November 1952
- Presenters: Eric Morley
- Venue: Lyceum Ballroom, London, United Kingdom
- Entrants: 11
- Placements: 5
- Debuts: Finland; Ireland; Switzerland; West Germany
- Withdrawals: Mexico
- Winner: May-Louise Flodin; Sweden

Miss World 1952 was the 2nd edition of the Miss World pageant, held at the Lyceum Ballroom in London, United Kingdom, on 14 November 1952.

At the conclusion of the event, May-Louise Flodin of Sweden was announced as Miss World 1952. It was the first back-to-back victory in Miss World. During the announcement of winners, Flodin was only awarded with a trophy and a bouquet. It is also the second victory of Sweden in the pageant.

A special award was given by actress and former beauty queen Betty Hutton, who came third-runner up in each of her beauty pageant. It was given to Eva Hellas of Finland. It is also known, unofficially, that the fourth-runner up was Marlene Ann Dee of United Kingdom and the fifth runner-up was Nicole Drouin from France.

Eleven contestants from ten countries participated in this year's pageant, the smallest number of contestants in its history. The pageant was hosted by Eric Morley.

== Background ==
=== Selection of participants ===
Eleven contestants from ten countries were selected to compete in the pageant. Two contestant was invited to compete again to even out the number of contestants, while two contestants were appointed to replace the original winner.

==== Replacements ====
Elisabeth van Proosdij was set to represent Holland at Miss World. However, Van Proosdij chose to get married during her reign. Therefore, Sanny Weitner, first runner-up at Miss Holland 1951, was appointed as the representative of Holland at Miss World.

==== Debuts and withdrawals ====
After promoting the competition with twelve contestants, Morley thought of inviting Miss Britain 1951 Marlene Ann Dee to complete the twelve contestants in this edition. This edition marked the debuts of Finland, Ireland, Switzerland and West Germany. Belgium was also set to debut this year, however, Anne-Marie Pauwels refused to part from her boyfriend during the contest, leading to her disqualification. Thus, only eleven contestants competed in the finals. Leila Teresa Tuma of Syria did not compete due to political tensions.

== Results ==
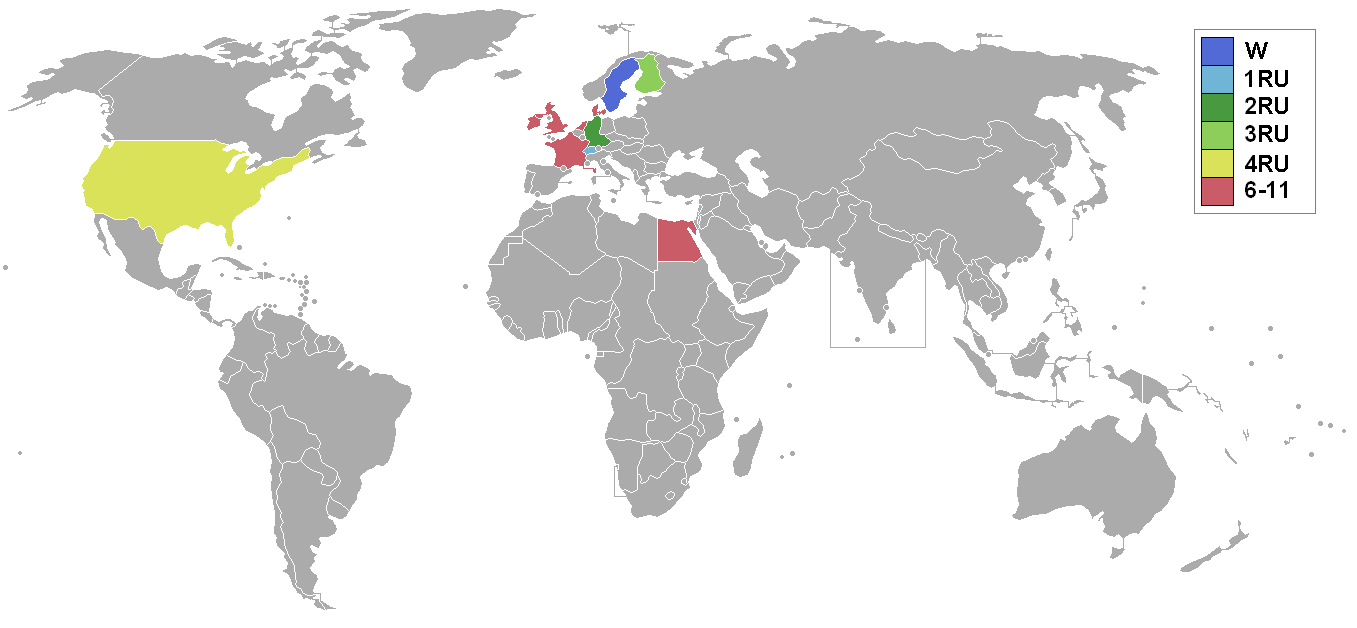
Miss World 1952 participating countries

=== Placements ===
Placement	Contestant
Miss World 1952	Sweden – May-Louise Flodin
1st Runner-Up	Switzerland – Sylvia Müller
2nd Runner-Up	West Germany – Vera Marks
3rd Runner-Up	Finland – Eva Hellas
4th Runner-Up	United Kingdom – Marlene Ann Dee
5th Runner-Up	France – Nicole Drouin

== Judges ==
A panel of six judges evaluated the performances of the eleven contestants. They were:

- Glynis Johns - actress
- Petula Clark - singer and actress
- Richard Todd - actor
- Claude Berr - co-organizer of the Miss Europe pageant
- Eddy Franklyn - owner of a model agency
- Charles Eade - editor of the Sunday Dispatch

== Contestants ==
Eleven contestants competed for the title.

Country	Contestant	Age (Note: Age at the time of the pageant)	Hometown
Denmark	Lillian Christensen	–	Copenhagen
Finland	Eva Hellas	19	Helsinki
France	Nicole Drouin	22	Paris
Ireland	Eithne Dunne	—	Dublin
Netherlands (Note: Competed as Holland in the pageant)	Sanny Weitner	19	Amsterdam
Sweden	May-Louise Flodin	20	Gothenburg
Switzerland	Sylvia Müller	20	Geneva
United Kingdom (Note: Competed as Britain in the pageant)	Doreen Dawne	29	London
United Kingdom	Marlene Ann Dee	20	London
United States	Tally Richards	24	New York City
West Germany	Vera Marks	19	Frankfurt
