= Miss World 1964 =

14th Miss World pageant

- Ann Sidney
- Date: 12 November 1964
- Presenters: Michael Aspel
- Venue: Lyceum Ballroom, London, United Kingdom
- Broadcaster: BBC
- Entrants: 42
- Placements: 16
- Debuts: Aruba; Montserrat
- Withdrawals: Bolivia; Chile; Cyprus; Israel; Jordan; Malaysia; Mexico; Nigeria; Peru
- Returns: Ecuador; Gibraltar; Honduras; Italy; Lebanon; Morocco; Nicaragua; Republic of China; Uruguay
- Winner: Ann Sidney; United Kingdom

Miss World 1964 was the 14th edition of the Miss World pageant, held at the Lyceum Ballroom in London, United Kingdom, on 12 November 1964.

At the end of the event, Carole Joan Crawford of Jamaica crowned Ann Sidney of the United Kingdom as Miss World 1964. It was the United Kingdom's second victory in the history of the pageant. Ana María Soria of Argentina finished as first runner-up, while Linda Lin of the Republic of China finished as second runner-up.

Contestants from forty-two countries and territories participated in this pageant. The pageant was hosted by Michael Aspel.

== Background ==
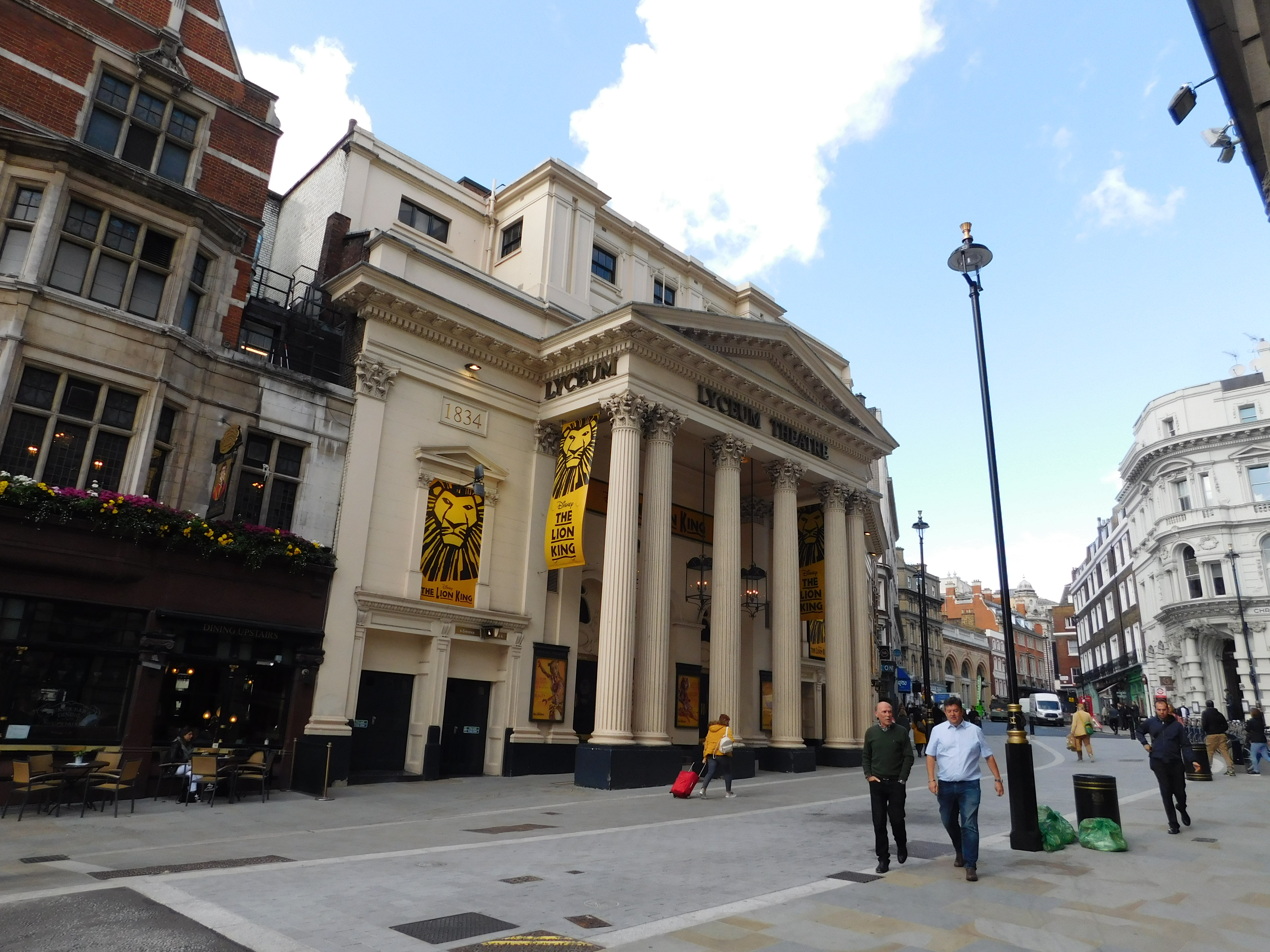
Lyceum Ballroom, the location of Miss World 1964

=== Selection of participants ===
Participants from forty-two countries and territories were chosen to compete in the pageant. Three contestants were appointed to represent their countries/territories after placing as runners-up in their national pageants, or were selected through a casting process.

==== Replacements ====
Miss Jamaica 1964 first runner-up Erica Cooke was appointed to represent her country after the original winner, Mitsy Constantine, had her request to be accompanied by her mother at the pageant rejected. This followed a change in pageant policy prohibiting contestants from being accompanied by their mothers, which was enacted after Miss World 1963 Carole Joan Crawford's mother accompanied her during her reign as Miss World. Jacqueline Gayraud was appointed as the new Miss France 1964 to compete at Miss World after Arlette Collot, the original winner, refused to tour across France. Miss Turkey 1964 Ayten Örnek was originally scheduled to compete. However, second runner-up Nurlan Coşkun accused the organizers of telling her she would win. To resolve the situation, Örnek was sent to Miss International, and Coşkun was sent to Miss World.

==== Debuts, returns, and withdrawals ====
The territories of Aruba and Montserrat competed for the first time. Returning to this edition were Morocco, which last competed in 1958; Gibraltar and Honduras, which both last competed in 1959; Lebanon, which last competed in 1961; and Ecuador, Italy, the Republic of China, and Uruguay, which all last competed in 1962.

Countries that did not compete in this edition include Bolivia, Jordan, Israel, Malaysia, Mexico, Nigeria, Peru, Chile, and Cyprus. Sonia Marino Cárdenas of Bolivia did not compete because she chose to continue her studies. Ofira Margalit of Israel did not compete due to her conscription. Katie Barnaba Faizah of Jordan, Leonie Foo Saw Pheng of Malaysia, Olga Ceniceros of Mexico, and Nora Pallarés of Chile did not compete due to undisclosed reasons. Martha Bassey of Nigeria did not compete due to a lack of budget. Peru and Cyprus did not participate after their national organizations failed to hold a national competition or appoint a delegate.

Marvo Manning of Barbados, Alice Weber of Curaçao, Henrietta Monteiro of Zambia, and Lea Avaemai Vahine of Tahiti were also scheduled to compete in this edition, but ultimately did not proceed due to undisclosed reasons.

== Results ==
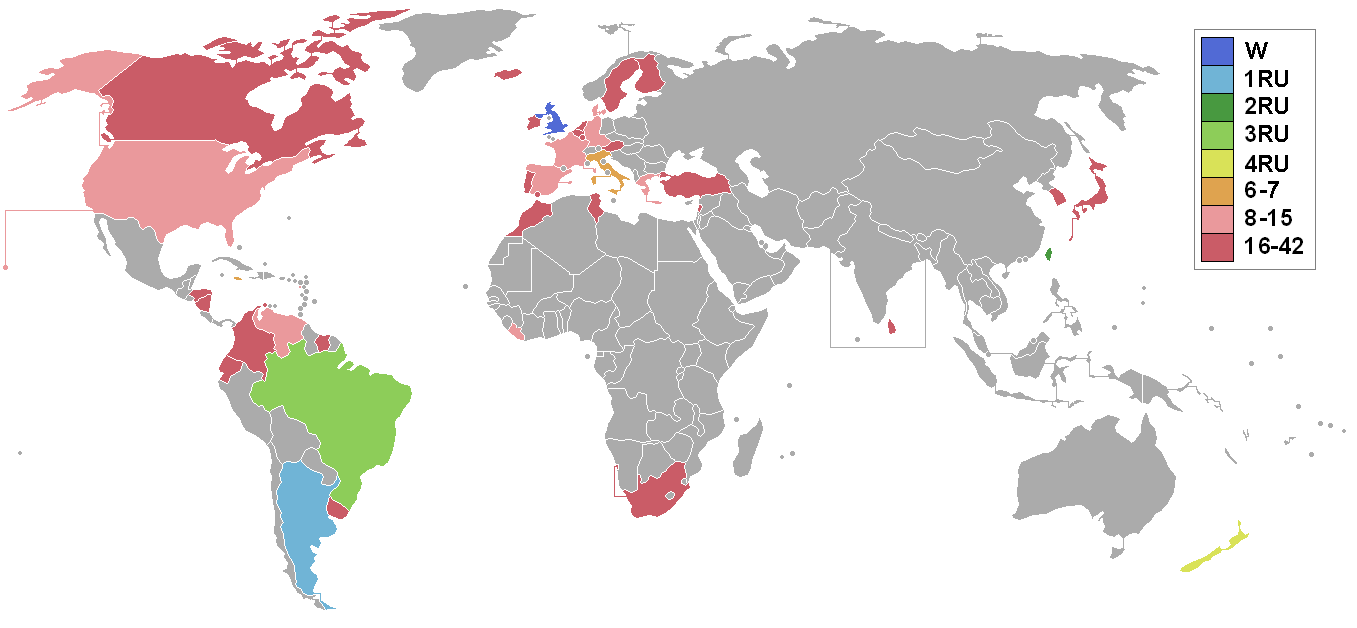
Countries and territories which participated in Miss World 1964 and their placements.

=== Placements ===
Placement	Contestant
Miss World 1964	United Kingdom – Ann Sidney
1st runner-up	Argentina – Ana María Soria
2nd runner-up	(Taiwan) Republic of China – Linda Lin
3rd runner-up	Brazil – Maria Isabel Avelar
4th runner-up	New Zealand – Lyndal Cruickshank
Top 7	Italy – Mirka Sartori; Jamaica – Erica Cooke
Top 16	Denmark – Yvonne Mortensen; France – Jacqueline Gayraud; Germany – Juliane Herm; Greece – Mary Kouyoumitzou; Liberia – Norma Dorothy Davis; Montserrat – Helen Joseph; Spain – María José Ulla; United States – Jeanne Marie Quinn; Venezuela – Mercedes Hernández

== Pageant ==
=== Format ===
As in 1961, fifteen semi-finalists were chosen through a preliminary competition held on the day of the final competition, which consisted of the swimsuit and evening gown competitions. However, because two contestants tied in score for the fifteenth spot, Morley decided to include both of them, making it sixteen semi-finalists advancing in the competition. The sixteen semi-finalists competed in the swimsuit competition and evening gown competition, and seven finalists were subsequently chosen to compete in the final interview.

- Paul Anka – Canadian singer
- Billy Butlin – English businessman
- John Cavanagh – Irish designer
- Bernard Delfont – English theatrical entrepreneur
- Tab Hunter – American actor
- Lady Sonia Elizabeth Melchett
- Vidal Sassoon, CBE – English hairstylist and businessman
- Nicolette Elaine Katherine Vane-Tempest-Stewart – Marchioness of Londonderry
- Godfrey Herbert Winn – English journalist

== Contestants ==
Forty-two contestants competed for the title.

Country/Territory	Contestant	Age (Note: Ages at the time of the pageant)	Hometown
Argentina	Ana María Soria	23	Buenos Aires
Aruba	Regina Croes	21	Oranjestad
Austria	Victoria Lazek	20	Vienna
Belgium	Danièle Defrere	20	Brussels
Brazil	Maria Isabel Avelar	18	Aracaju
Canada	Mary Lou Farrell	21	Newfoundland
(Sri Lanka) Ceylon	Marina Dellerene Swan	18	Colombo
Colombia	Paulina Vargas	–	Huila
Denmark	Yvonne Mortensen	19	Copenhagen
Ecuador	María de Lourdes Anda	19	Guayaquil
Finland	Maila Östring	19	–
France	Jacqueline Gayraud	18	Paris
Germany	Juliane Herm	19	Stuttgart
Gibraltar	Lydia Davis	19	Gibraltar
Greece	Mary Kouyoumitzou	18	Heraklion
Honduras	Araceli Cano	23	Francisco Morazán
Iceland	Rósa Einarsdóttir	19	Reykjavík
(Republic of Ireland) Ireland	Mairen Cullen	20	Dublin
Italy	Mirka Sartori	20	Veneto
Jamaica	Erica Cooke	17	Kingston
Japan	Yoshiko Nakatani	24	Ibaraki
Lebanon	Nana Barakat	–	Beirut
Liberia	Norma Dorothy Davis	19	Monrovia
Luxembourg	Gabrielle Heyrard	17	Luxembourg City
Montserrat	Helen Joseph	22	Plymouth
Morocco	Leila Gourmala	21	Rabat
Netherlands	Renske van der Berg	19	The Hague
New Zealand	Lyndal Cruikshank	21	Invercargill
Nicaragua	Sandra Correa	16	Masaya
Portugal	Rolanda Campos	24	Lisbon
(Taiwan) Republic of China	Linda Lin	22	Taichung
South Africa	Vedra Karamitas	22	Transvaal
South Korea	Yoon Mi-hee	23	Seoul
Spain	María José Ulla	19	La Coruña
Suriname	Norma Dorothy Tin Chen Fung	18	Paramaribo
Sweden	Agneta Malmgren	19	–
Tunisia	Dolly Allouche	18	Tunis
Turkey	Nurlan Coşkun	18	Istanbul
United Kingdom	Ann Sidney	20	Parkstone
United States	Jeanne Marie Quinn	20	East Meadow
Uruguay	Alicia Elena Gómez	–	Montevideo
Venezuela	Mercedes Hernández	19	Caracas
