= Ann Sidney =

British actress and beauty queen

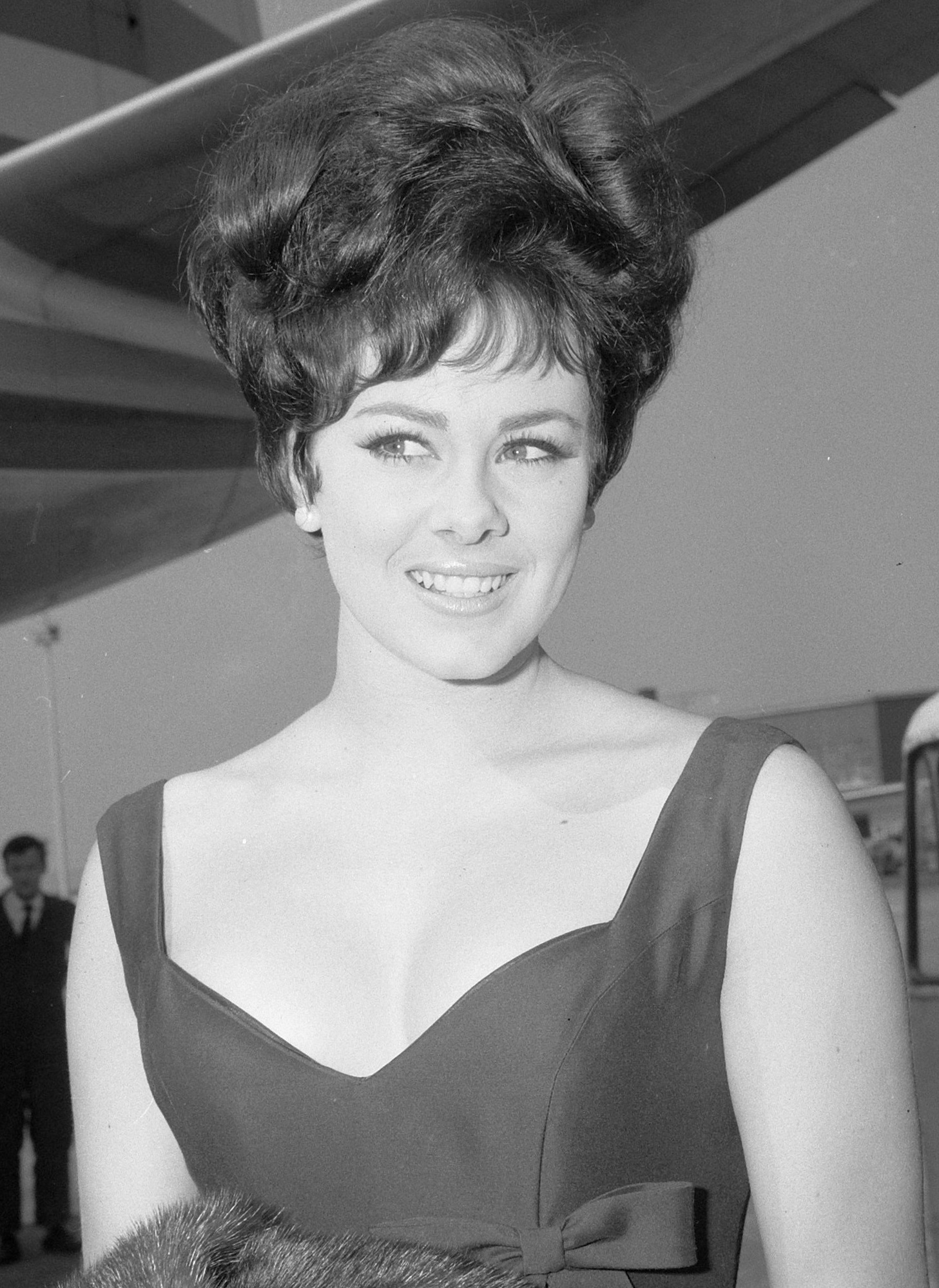
- Ann Sidney in 1965
- Born: 27 March 1944 (age 82); Poole, Dorset, England
- Occupations: Actress; model
- Spouse(s): 5, including: Rod McLennan (m. 1970; div. 1972) Duncan Weldon (m. 2005; died 2019)
- Awards: Miss United Kingdom 1964; Miss World 1964
- Website: annsidney.com

Ann Sidney (born 27 March 1944) is a British actress, television host and beauty queen who won the 1964 Miss World contest representing the United Kingdom.

== Early life ==
Sidney moved to Poole when very young. She went to Martin Road School in Parkstone and then Martin Kemp-Welch secondary school, which later became St Aldhelm's Academy, leaving school at fifteen. She initially took an apprenticeship in hairdressing, working in salons in Bournemouth, but then decided that she would rather be a model.

== Miss World ==
Sidney became the second woman of a current total of five from Great Britain to win the title, after Rosemarie Frankland in 1961, and the first of two from Poole. The pageant was held in London on 12 November 1964. It was watched on television by a reported 27.2 million people in the UK alone. During her reign as Miss World, she travelled around the world five times and joined Bob Hope on his USO tour of Asia.

== Career ==
After relinquishing the Miss World title, Sidney had many television acting roles, including The Avengers and Are You Being Served?, and in films, including the spy thriller Sebastian (1968) with Dirk Bogarde and Susannah York, and the Donald Cammell/Nicolas Roeg film Performance (1970) with James Fox and Mick Jagger, as well as forming a touring cabaret act. In 1967 she appeared in the long-running West End farce Not Now, Darling opposite Donald Sinden and Bernard Cribbins.

Sidney has appeared in numerous stage musicals such as Jacques Brel is Alive and Well and Living in Paris and as Maria von Trapp in the Sound of Music. She has also appeared in several Christmas pantomimes in the UK, such as Prince Charming in Cinderella with Brian Conley and as Dick in Dick Whittington with Les Dawson. She also spent six years as a lead singer at the MGM Grand Las Vegas.

In December 1970, Sidney married actor Rod McLennan and moved to Australia. She featured in several Australian television programs, including the comedy series Birds In The Bush (1972), the war drama Spyforce and later co-hosted an Australian version of the game show, The Better Sex (1978).

== Personal life ==
Both before and during her reign as Miss World, Sidney was dating Bruce Forsyth, who at the time was married to Penny Calvert.

In December 1970 Sidney married actor Rod McLennan and moved to Australia; The couple divorced in 1972. In 2005 Sidney married her fifth husband, the West End producer Duncan Weldon. He died in 2019.

Awards and achievements
Preceded by (Jamaica) Carole Crawford	Miss World; 1964	Succeeded by (United Kingdom) Lesley Langley
