= Miss World 1951 =

1st Miss World pageant

- Kiki Håkansson
- Date: 27 July 1951
- Presenters: Eric Morley
- Venue: Lyceum Ballroom, London, United Kingdom
- Entrants: 27
- Placements: 5
- Debuts: Denmark; France; Holland; Mexico; Sweden; United Kingdom; United States
- Winner: Kiki Håkansson; Sweden

Miss World 1951 was the 1st edition of the Miss World pageant, held at the Lyceum Ballroom in London, United Kingdom, on 27 July 1951. The contest was originally intended to be a one-off event connected with the Festival of Britain.

At the conclusion of the event, Kiki Håkansson of Sweden was announced as Miss World 1951. This is the first victory of Sweden in the history of the pageant. Håkansson is also the only winner to be crowned wearing a bikini.

Twenty-seven contestants from seven countries participated in this year's pageant. The pageant was hosted by Eric Morley.

== Background ==
=== Location and date ===
The decade of the 1950s began and Europe was just beginning to rise after World War II. In Britain, people slowly returned to normal. Herbert Morrison, a member of the British parliament, began planning the centennial celebration of the 1851 Great Exhibition. In the summer of 1951, the “Festival of Great Britain” was finally born and it was located in Central London, on the banks of the River Thames.

The Lyceum Ballroom, located half a mile from the South Bank where the Festival of Great Britain was being held, belonged to Mecca Dancing. Being so close to the headquarters of the Festival of Great Britain, Mecca Dancing was asked by the event's organizers if they could contribute in any way to the Festival. Eric Morley was the Publicity Sales Manager of Mecca Dancing, responsible for finding innovative ideas for the Festival. He wanted to create some activity or event that would attract attention, not only to young people but to people of all ages. This is how he suggested creating an international beauty pageant and proposed it to the organizers. Morley’s suggestion was accepted and the planning of the first Miss World pageant was in full swing. He saw how Bikini fashion was popular and decided that the contest would show beautiful women wearing that tiny garment. Initially, the event would be called “Girl Bikini Contest of the Festival of Great Britain” but due to its international character and after the comment of some journalists, Morley decided to call it “Miss World” after making sure that name had not been previously used or patented. The first Miss World contest would be held that summer of 1951, being one of the last events of the Festival of Great Britain.

=== Selection of participants ===
==== Debuts ====
Twenty-seven contestants from seven countries were selected to compete in the pageant, which included twenty-one from the United Kingdom. This edition marked the debuts of Denmark, France, Holland, Mexico, Sweden, the United Kingdom (Note: Competed as Britain in the pageant) and the United States. Originally, there were thirty contestants competing in the pageant, but Mary Akroyd and two more married ladies decided not to show up due to their husbands’ objection to showing themselves wearing bikinis before the eyes of other men.

== Results ==
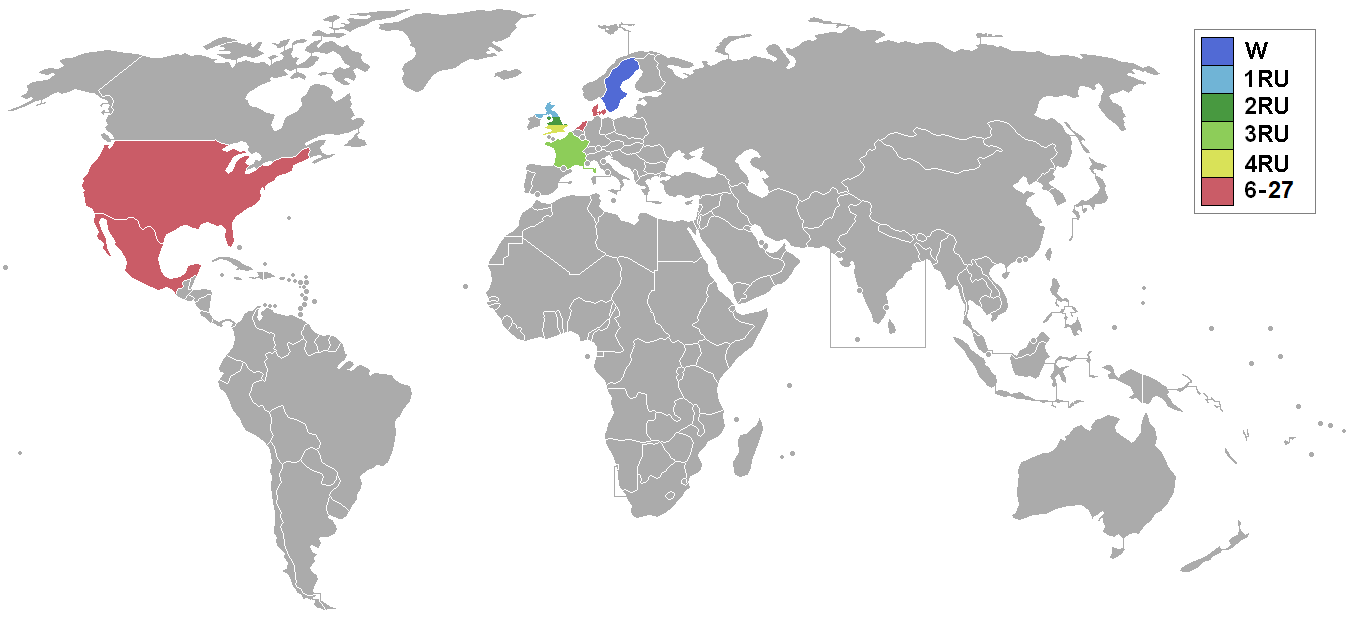
Miss World 1951 participating countries and territories

=== Placements ===
Placement	Contestant
Miss World 1951	Sweden – Kiki Håkansson
1st Runner-Up	United Kingdom – Laura Ellison
2nd Runner-Up	United Kingdom – Doreen Dawne
3rd Runner-Up	France – Jacqueline Lemoine
4th Runner-Up	United Kingdom – Aileen Chase

== Contestants ==
Twenty-seven contestants competed for the title.

Country	Contestant	Age (Note: Age at the time of the pageant)	Hometown
Denmark	Lily Jacobsen	18	Copenhagen
France	Jacqueline Lemoine	19	Paris
Holland	Margaret van Beer	–	Amsterdam
Mexico	Brenda Cotton	21	Mexico City
Sweden	Kiki Håkansson	22	Stockholm
United Kingdom	Aileen Chase	20	Southwick
United Kingdom	Ann West	18	Ilford
United Kingdom	Brenda Mee	18	Derby
United Kingdom	Doreen Dawne	28	London
United Kingdom	Elaine Pryce	22	Bolton
United Kingdom	Fay Cotton	18	East Midlands
United Kingdom	Jean Sweeney	–	Liverpool
United Kingdom	Jean Worthe	–	London
United Kingdom	Laura Ellison	26	London
United Kingdom	Margaret Mills	–	Middleton
United Kingdom	Margaret Morgan	22	West Kirby
United Kingdom	Margaret Turner	–	Birmingham
United Kingdom	Marlene Ann Dee	19	London
United Kingdom	Mary McLaney	–	Clydebank
United Kingdom	Maureen O'Neill	19	Palmers Green
United Kingdom	Nina Way	21	London
United Kingdom	Norma Kitchen	21	Leeds
United Kingdom	Pat Cameron	–	Glasgow
United Kingdom	Sidney Walker	18	Fleetwood
United Kingdom	Sylvia Wren	20	Dagenham
United Kingdom	Thelma Kerr	19	Belfast
United States	Annette Gibson	20	Louisville
