= Miss Austria =

Beauty contest

Miss Austria Corporation Miss Österreich MISSion Austria
- Formation: 1929
- Type: Beauty pageant
- Headquarters: Steyr
- Location: Austria
- Official language: German
- National Director: Kerstin Rigger
- Website: Official website

Miss Austria is a national beauty pageant in Austria.

== History ==
- Between 1929 and 1931, the Miss Austria was managed by Neues Wiener Tagblatt. The winner went to International Pageant of Pulchritude, the first pageant to crown a Miss Universe. Lisl Goldarbeiter, Miss Austria 1929 of Vienna, won the first International competition.
- Starting in 1929, Miss Austria franchised the Miss Europe license.
- In 1948 and 1949, the weekly magazine Wiener Illustrierte managed the contest.
- Starting in 1953, Miss Austria franchised the Miss Universe license.
- Starting in 1955, Miss Austria franchised the Miss World license.
- In 1958 Erich Reindl took over the brand of Miss Austria.
- Starting in 1960, Miss Austria franchised the Miss International license.
- In 1992, Emil Bauer bought the Miss Austria Corporation.
- Beginning in 2012, Silvia Schachermayer (formerly Silvia Hackl, Miss Austria 2004) handled the Miss Austria Corporation.
- Starting in 2016, Miss Austria franchised the Miss Earth license.
- In 2018, Jörg Rigger made his debut as the CEO of Miss Austria Corporation, where later on Kerstin Rigger took over as CEO of Mission Austria.
  - The Miss Austria Organization has returned the Miss World and Miss Universe participation franchises. Therefore, Austria is not allowed to compete on both Miss World and Miss Universe pageants starting in 2018.

Note: In the pageant of Miss Austria, the first and second placed candidates of each federal state take part. So in the final there are 18 delegates from the 9 Bundesländer.

=== Franchise holders ===
The Miss Austria winner traditionally goes to Miss Universe and Miss World competitions; sometimes it could be allocated to Miss Europe. A runner-up will take over if the winner does not qualify to represent Austria on the world stage. In Schachermayer directorship between 2015 and 2017, the Miss Austria result divided into Top 3 classification winners. Before announcing the grand winner of Miss Austria, the Top 3 were automatically awarded as Miss Earth Austria, Miss World Austria and lastly, Miss Universe Austria.

Number of wins under Miss Austria
Pageant	Wins
Miss Europe	5
Miss World	2
International Pageant of Pulchritude	1
Miss Universe	0
Miss International	0
Miss Earth	0

High achievements from Miss Austria delegates between 1929 and 2013 include:
- Miss Europe (1950, 1958, 1959, 1978, 1980) – Beginning in 2006, Miss Austria did not send a contestant to Miss Europe, after the organization had been absent for a long time.
- Miss International (1963, 1972, 1982) – Since 1995, Austria has not presented a representative at Miss International.
- Miss World (1969, 1987)
- Miss Earth (2013) – Beginning in 2018, a delegate from Austria was selected by another franchise holder.
- Miss Universe (1977 – 1st Runner-up)
- International Pageant of Pulchritude (1929)

== Titleholders ==
Year	Miss Austria	Age	Province/State	Notes
1929	Elisabet "Lisl" Goldarbeiter	19	Vienna	Miss Universe 1929; International Pageant of Pulchritude
1930	Ingeborg (von) Grienberger	18	Styria	
1931	Hertha van Haentjens	20	Vienna	
1932–1947	no contest			
1948	Gertraude Decombe	21	Vienna	Did not compete
1949	Nadja Tiller	20	Vienna	
1950	Ingeborg "Inge" Marek	24	Vienna	Miss Austria despite being married
1951	no contest			
1952	Ingeborg "Inge" Freuis	19	Vorarlberg	
1953	Lore Felger	19	Vienna	
1954	no contest			
1955	Felicitas (von) Goebel	24	Vienna	
1956	Traudl Eichinger	17	Vienna	
1957	Elisabeth "Sissy" Schübel-Auer	20	Vienna	
1958	Johanna "Hanni" Ehrenstrasser	19	Vienna	Miss Europe 1958
1959	Christine "Christl" Spazier	19	Vienna	Miss Europe 1959
1960	no contest			
1961	Heide "Heidi" Fischer	20	Vienna	
1962	Viktoria "Dorli" Lazek	18	Vienna	
1963	Xenia Doppler	20	Salzburg	Did not compete
1964	Erika Augustin	24	Vienna	Did not compete
1965	Carin Schmidt	22	Lower Austria	
1966	Eva "Evi" Rieck	17	Lower Austria	Did not compete
1967	Christina "Christl" Bartu	21	Vorarlberg	
1968	Brigitte Krüger	25	Lower Austria	
1969	Eva Rueber-Staier	19	Styria	Miss World 1969
1970	Elfriede "Eva" Kurz	19	Upper Austria	
1971	Sonja Mlinaric	19	Tyrol	Did not compete; got married
1972	Ursula "Uschi" Pacher	21	Carinthia	
1973	Roswitha Kobald	17	Styria	
1974	Evelyn Engleder	20	Vienna	
1975	Rosemarie Holzschuh	21	Lower Austria	
1976	Heidi Passian	19	Upper Austria	
1977	Eva Düringer	17	Vorarlberg	Miss Europe 1978
1978	Doris Anwander	17	Vorarlberg	
1979	Karin Zorn	18	Styria	Miss Europe 1980
1980	Helga Scheidl	16	Lower Austria	Did not compete
1981	Edda Schnell	18	Vienna	
1982	Elisabeth Kawan	19	Styria	
1983	Mercedes Stermitz	24	Styria	
1984	Michaela Nussbaumer	20	Vorarlberg	
1985	Elfriede Haindl	20	Styria	Did not compete
1986	Ulrike "Ulli" Harb	24	Styria	Did not compete
1987	Marielle Moosmann	18	Vorarlberg	Did not compete
1988	Sabine Grundner	18	Carinthia	Did not compete
1989	Nicole Natter	18	Vorarlberg	Did not compete
1990	Susanne Hausleitner	21	Styria	Did not compete
1991	Christine Heiss	23	Vorarlberg	Did not compete
1992	Tamara Mock	21	Vorarlberg	Did not compete
1993	Jutta Mirnig	19	Carinthia	Did not compete
1994	Eva Medosch	17	Vienna	Did not compete
1995	Dagmar Perl	19	Styria	Did not compete
1996	Sonja Horner	21	Upper Austria	Did not compete
1997	Susanne Nagele	17	Tyrol	
1998	Sabine Lindorfer	22	Upper Austria	
1999	Sandra Kölbl	20	Vorarlberg	
2000	Patricia Kaiser	15	Upper Austria	
2001	Daniela Rockenschaub	19	Upper Austria	
2002	Céline Roscheck	18	Lower Austria	Did not compete
2003	Tanja Duhovich	21	Vienna	Did not compete
2004	Silvia Hackl	21	Upper Austria	Did not compete
2005	Isabella Stangl	19	Salzburg	Did not compete
2006	Tatjana Batinić	20	Vienna	
2007	Christine Reiler	25	Lower Austria	
2008	Marina Schneider	18	Tyrol	Did not compete
2009	Anna Hammel	21	Upper Austria	
2010	Valentina Schlager	18	Carinthia	Did not compete
2011	Carmen Stamboli	27	Vienna	Did not compete
2012	Amina Dagi	17	Vorarlberg	
2013	Ena Kadic	23	Tyrol	
2014	Julia Furdea	19	Upper Austria	
2015	Annika Grill	21	Upper Austria	
2016	Dragana Stanković	19	Lower Austria	
2017	Celine Schrenk	19	Lower Austria	
2018	Daniela Zivkov	21	Upper Austria	Dethroned; did not compete
2018	Izabela Ion	24	Vorarlberg	Successor
2019	Larissa Robitschko	21	Styria	Did not compete
2020	no contest			
2021	Linda Lawal	18	Upper Austria	Did not compete
2022	no contest			
2023	Valentina Bleckenwegner	23	Upper Austria	Did not compete
2024	Lucia Sisic	20	Vienna	Did not compete; died in 2026
2025–2026	no contest			

=== Gallery ===
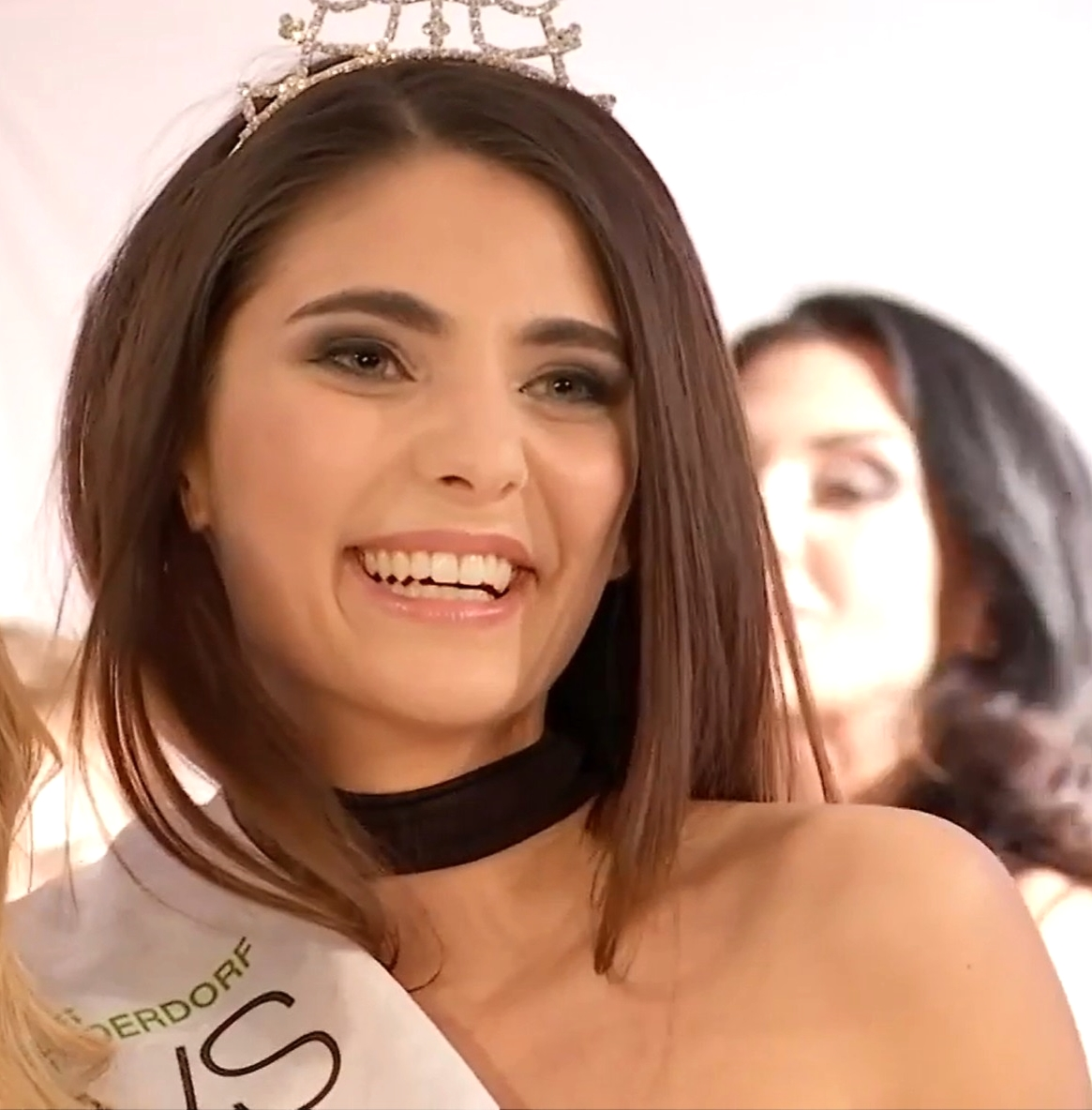
Miss Austria 2018 (dethroned)
Daniela Zivkov

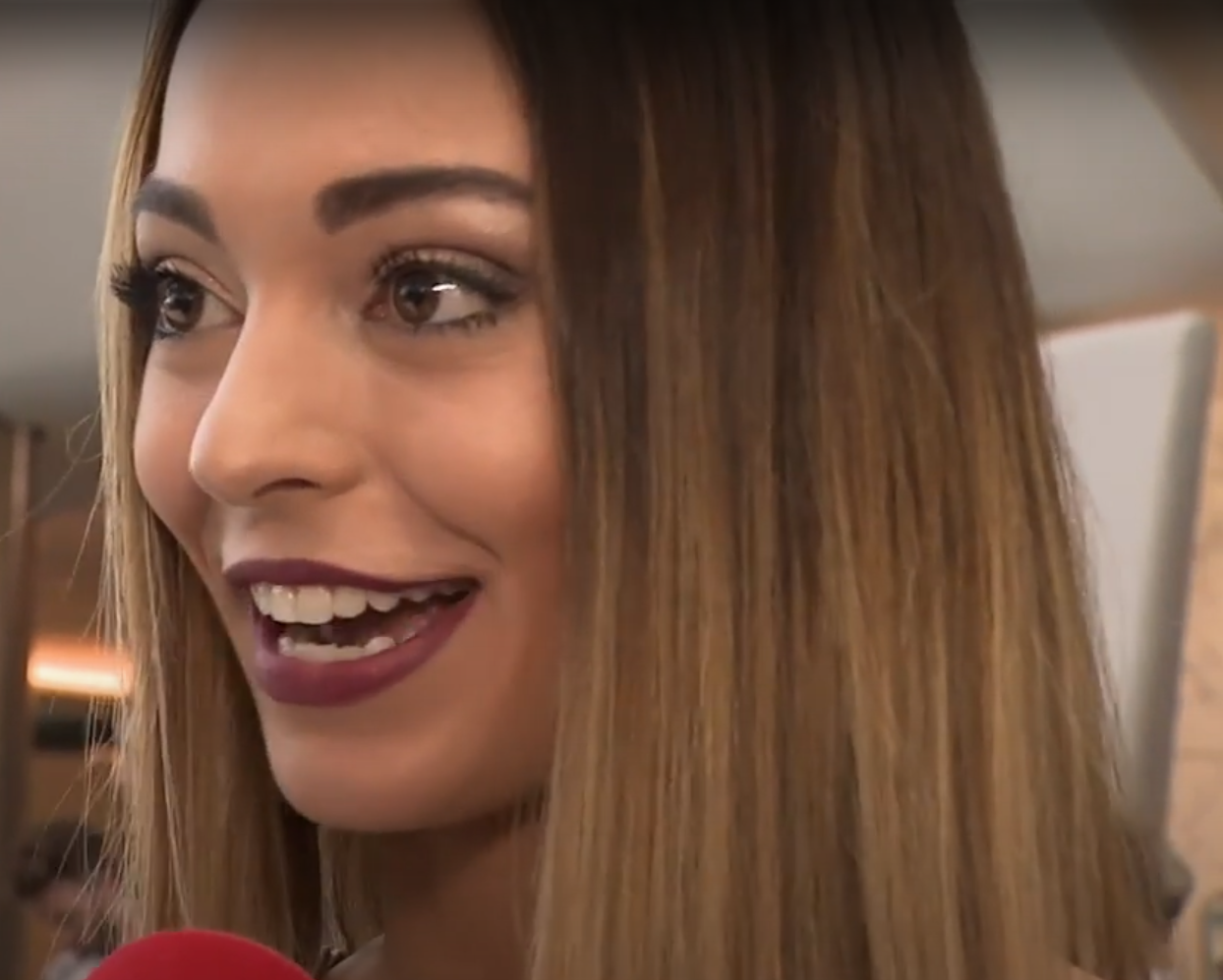
Miss Austria 2017
Celine Schrenk

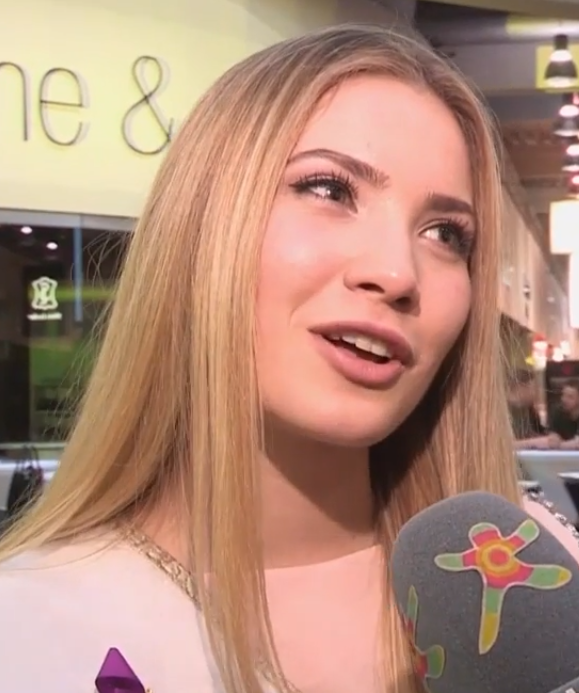
Miss Austria 2016
Dragana Stanković

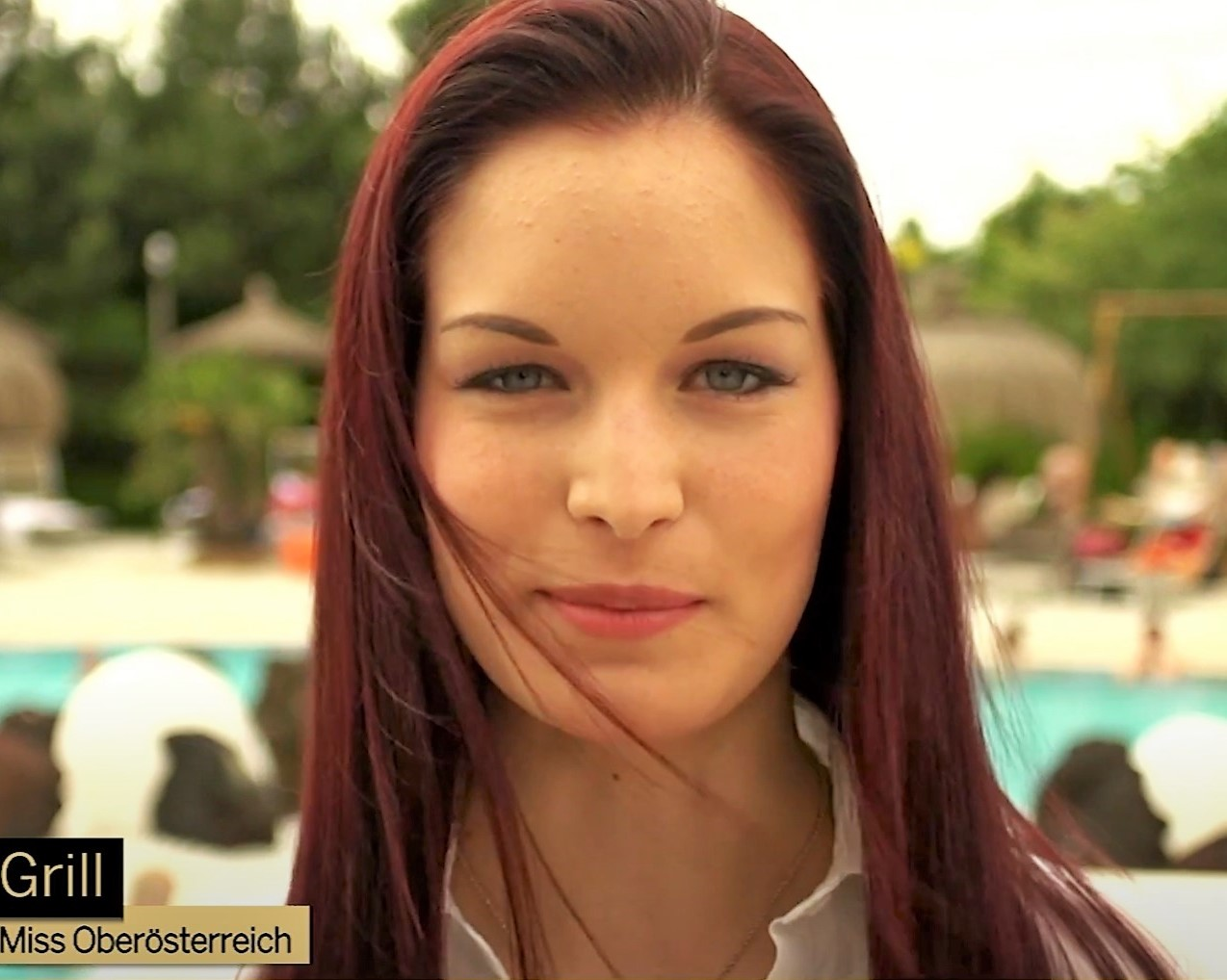
Miss Austria 2015
Annika Grill

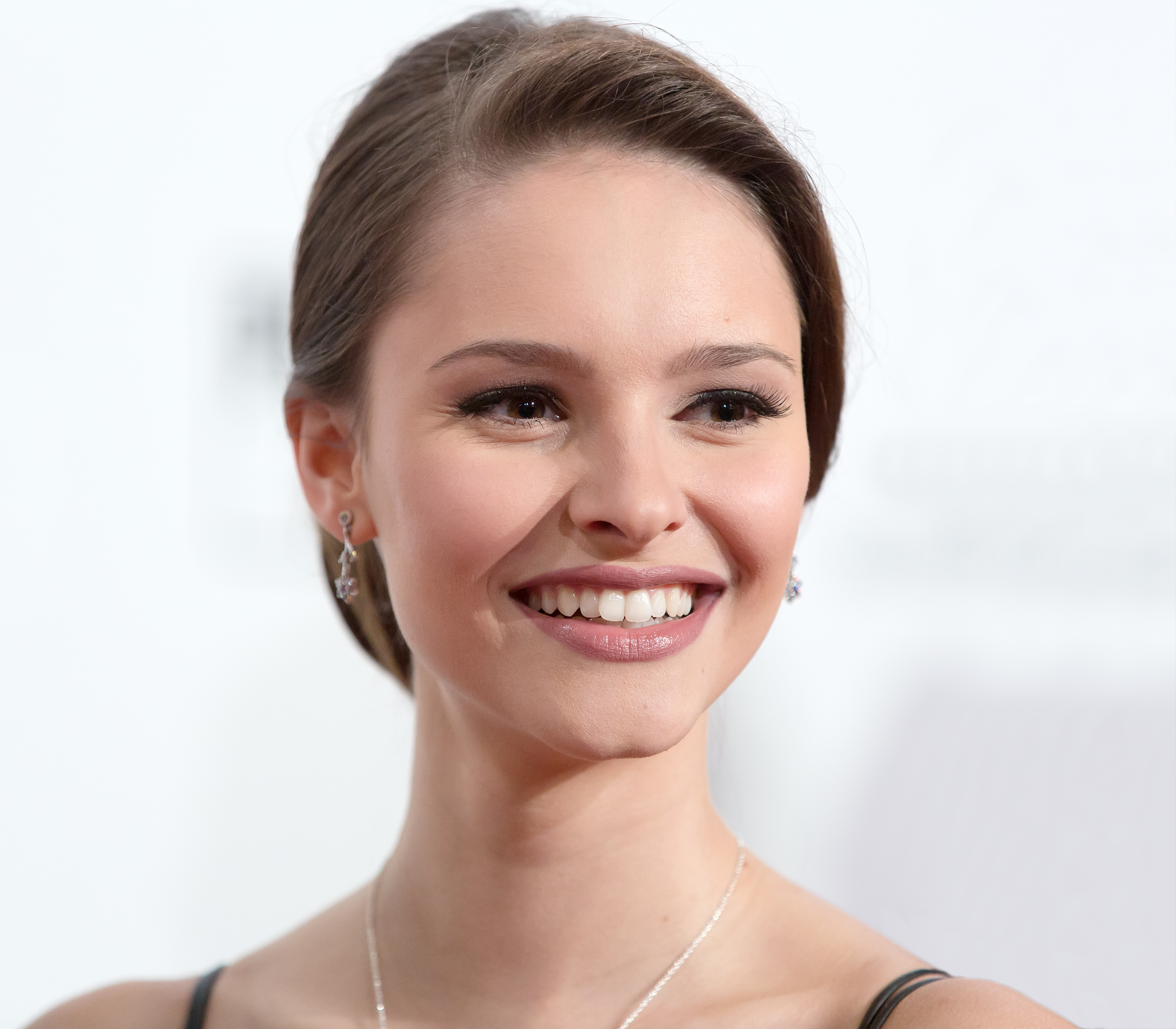
Miss Austria 2014
Julia Furdea

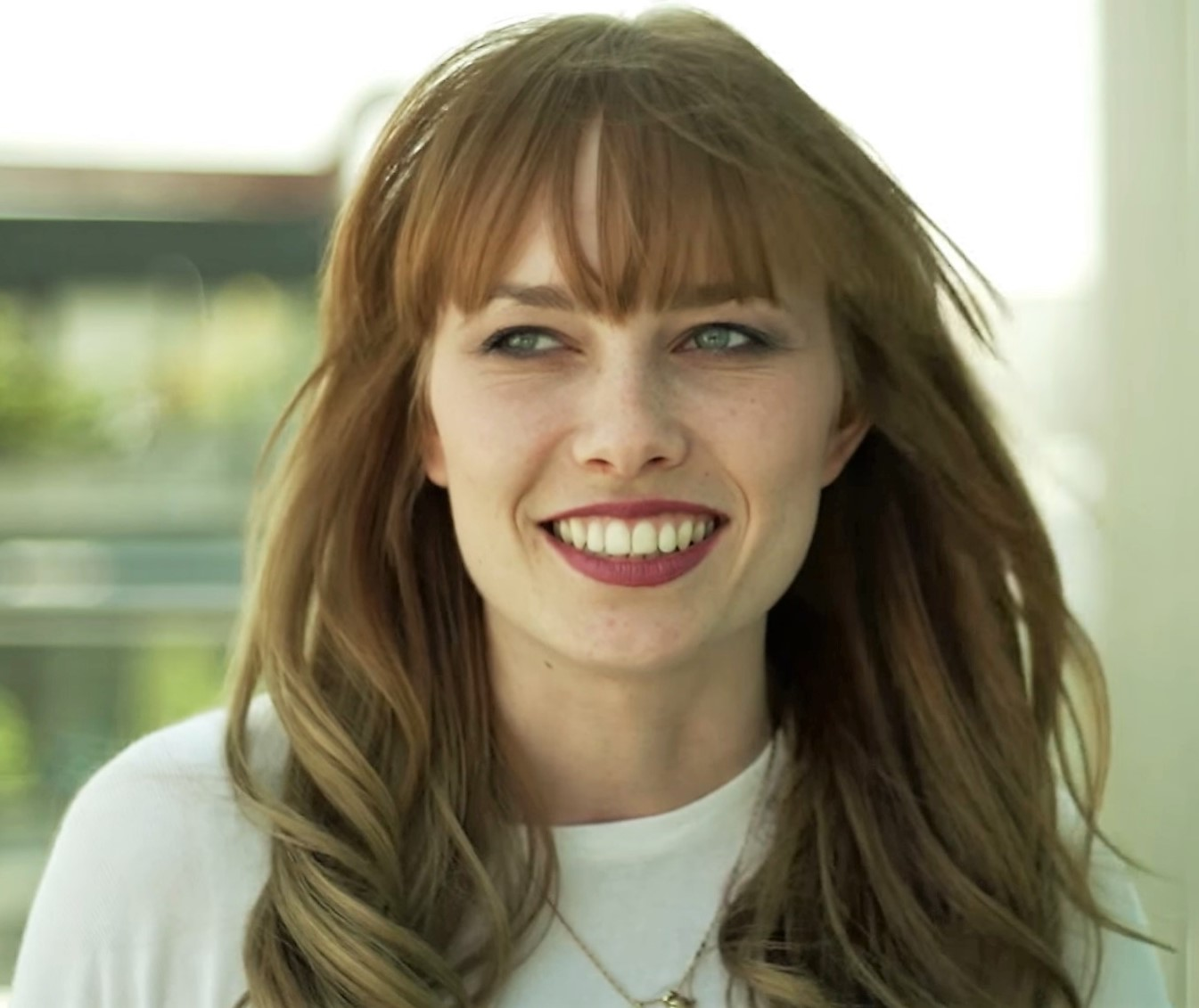
Miss Austria 2013
Ena Kadic

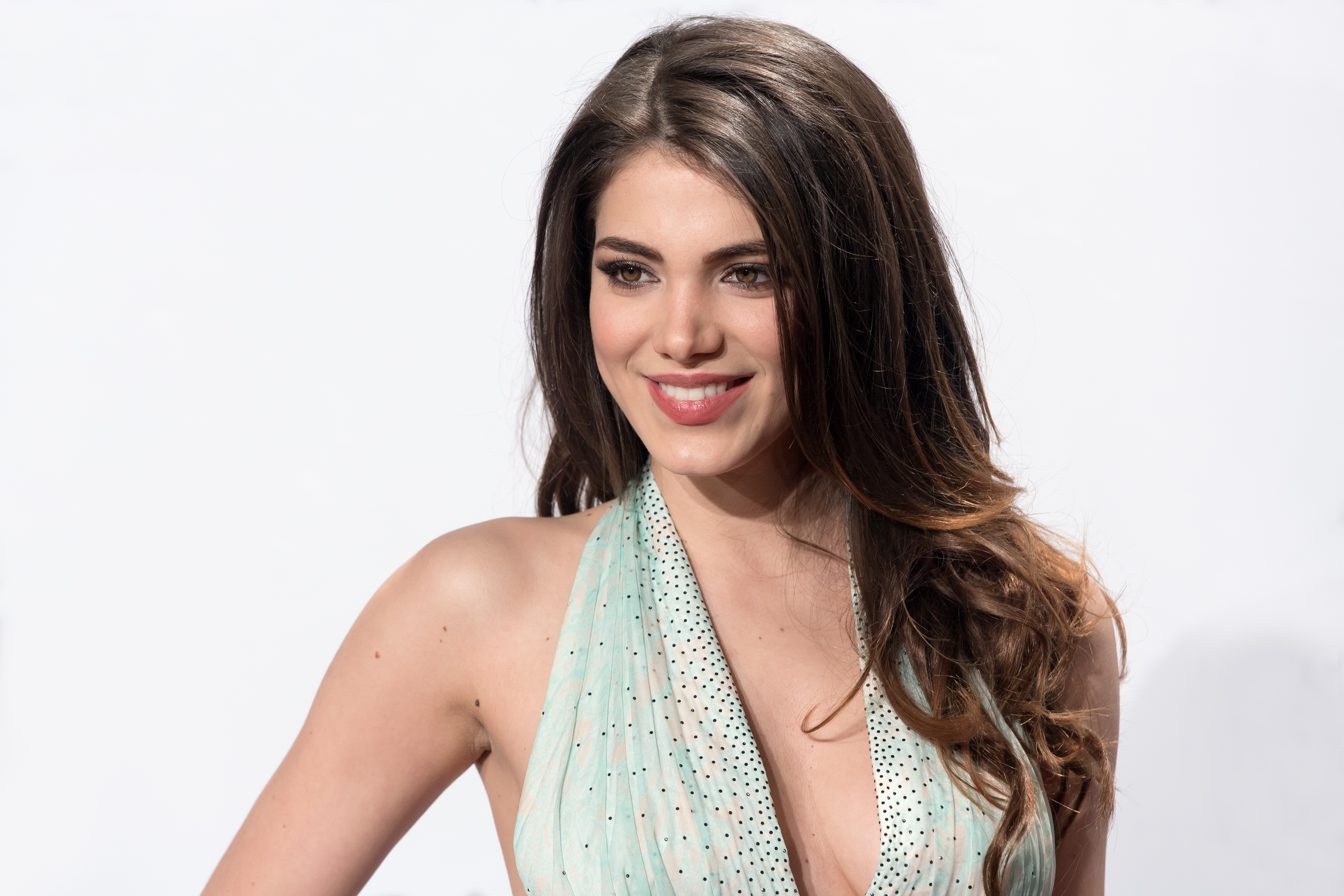
Miss Austria 2012
Amina Dagi

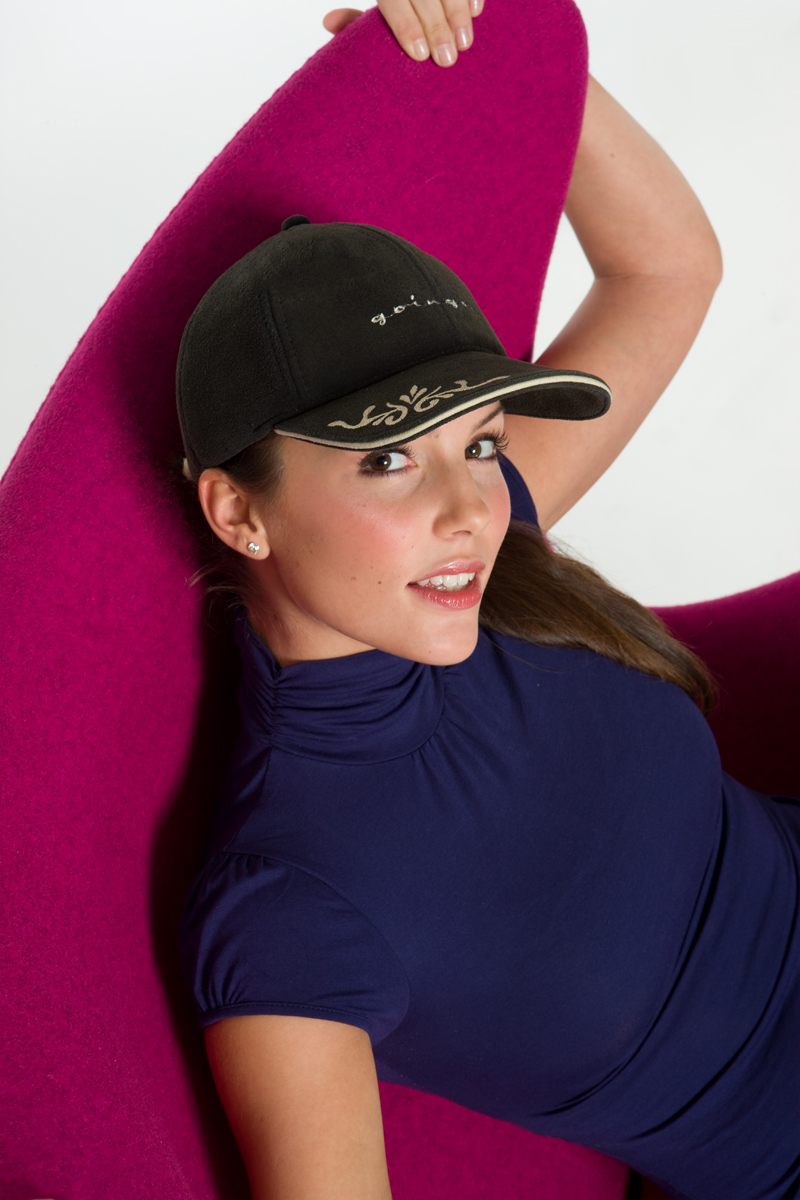
Miss Austria 2009
Anna Hammel

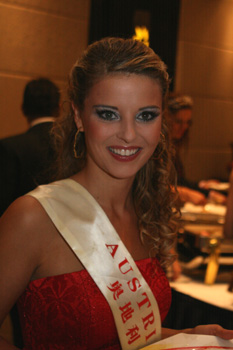
Miss Austria 2007
Christine Reiler

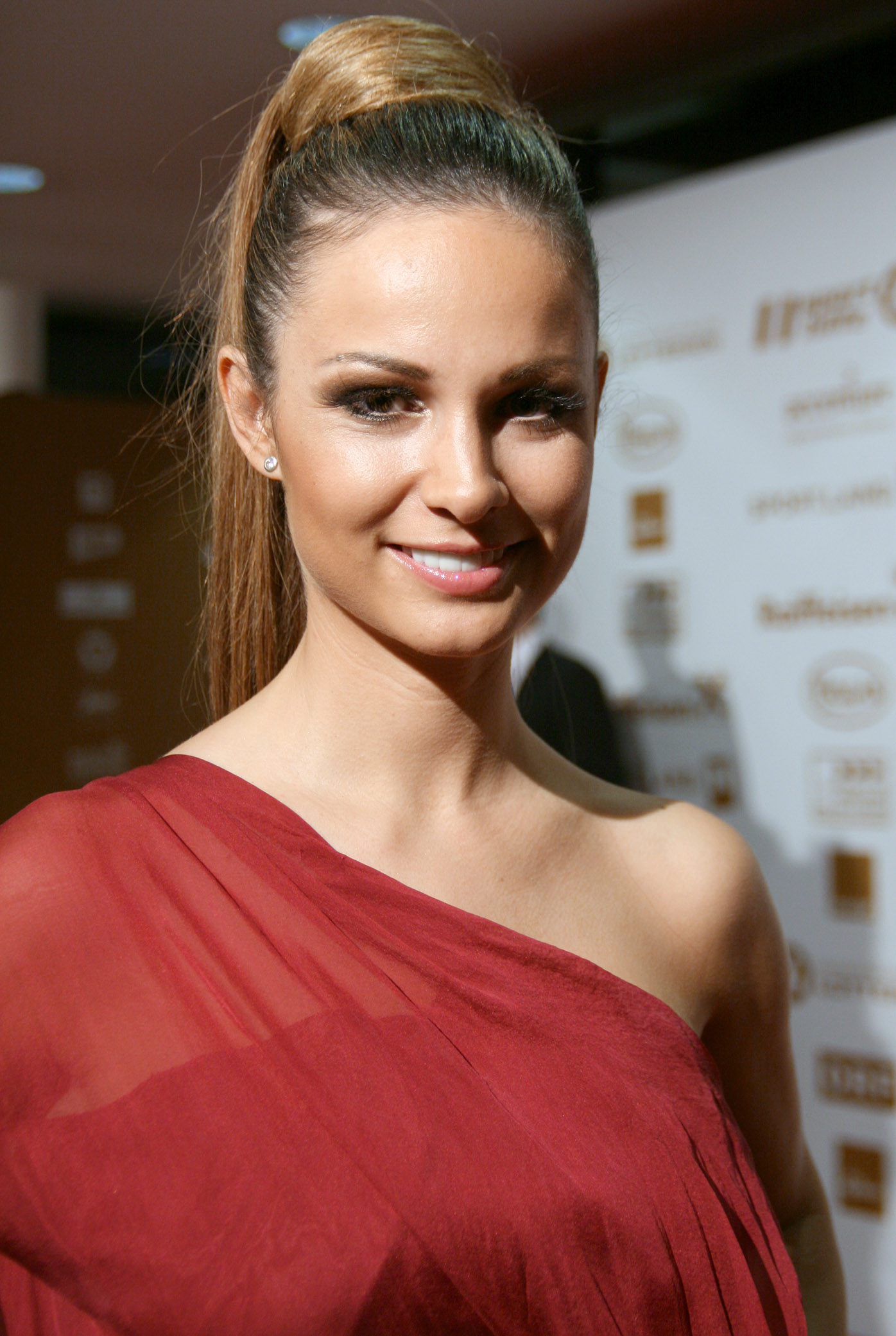
Miss Austria 2004
Silvia Hackl

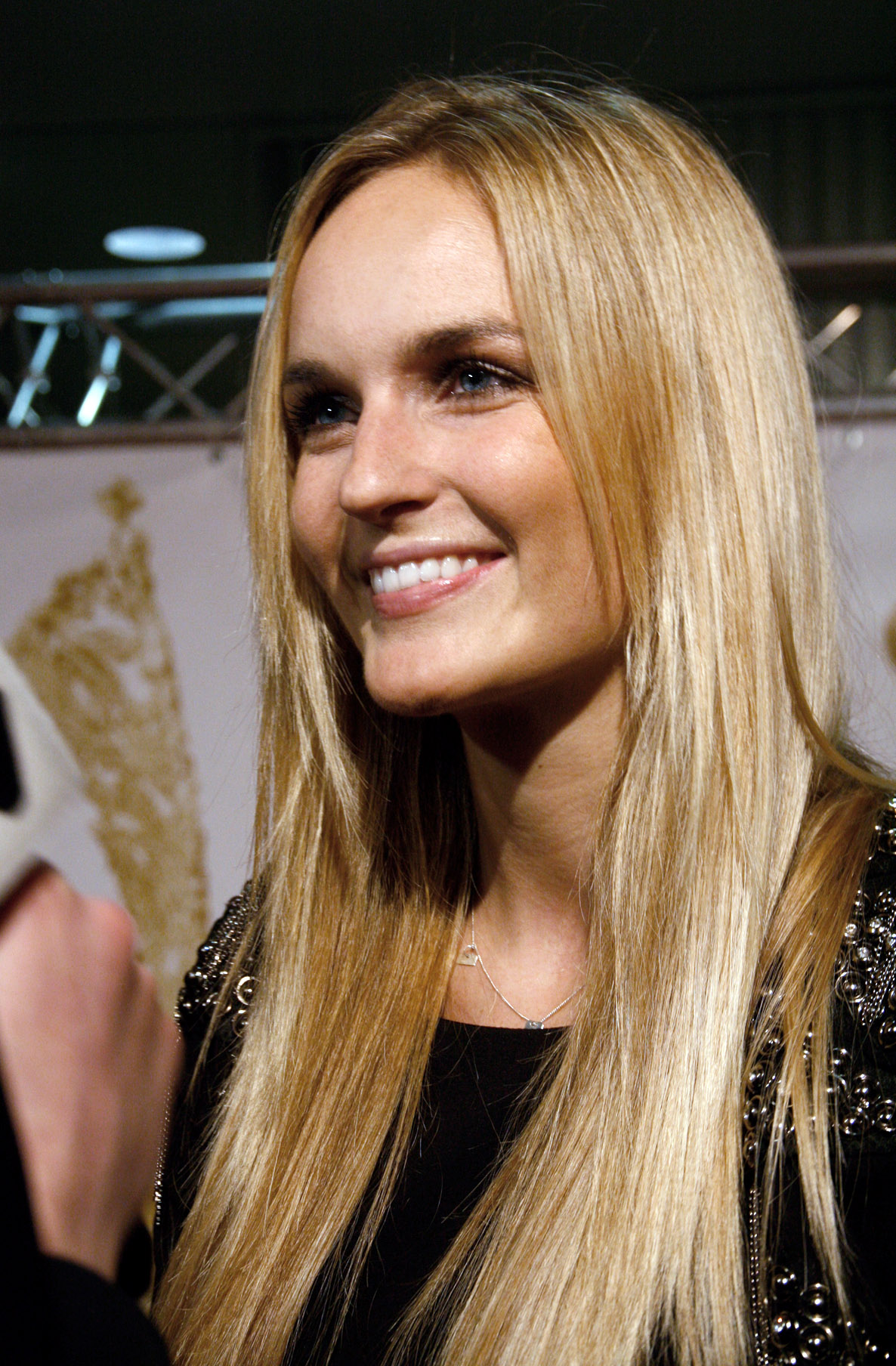
Miss Austria 2000
Patricia Kaiser

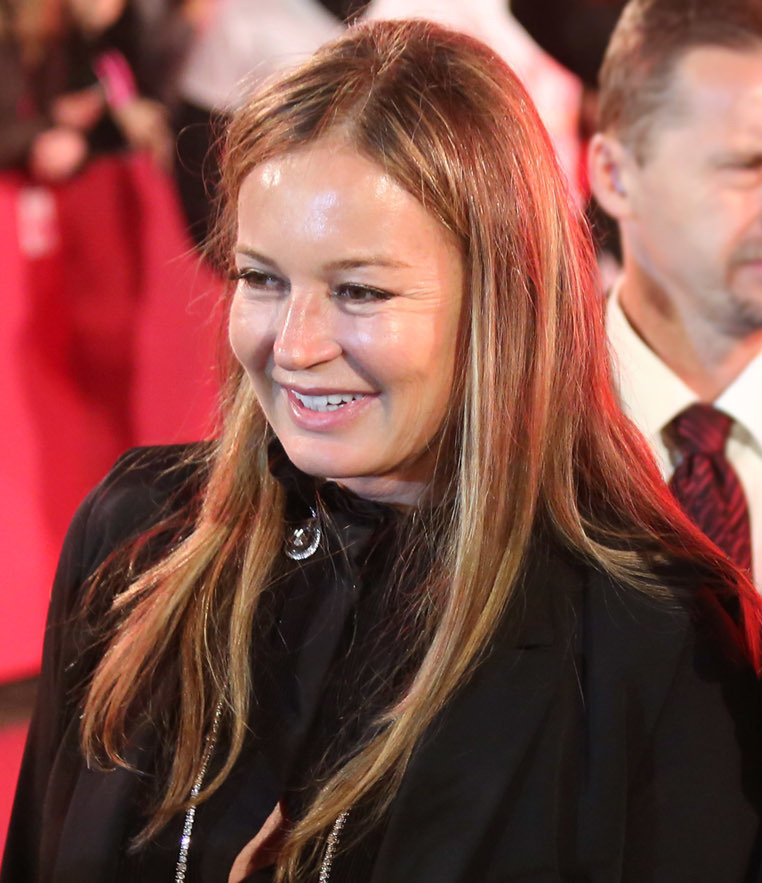
Miss Austria 1977
Eva Cavalli

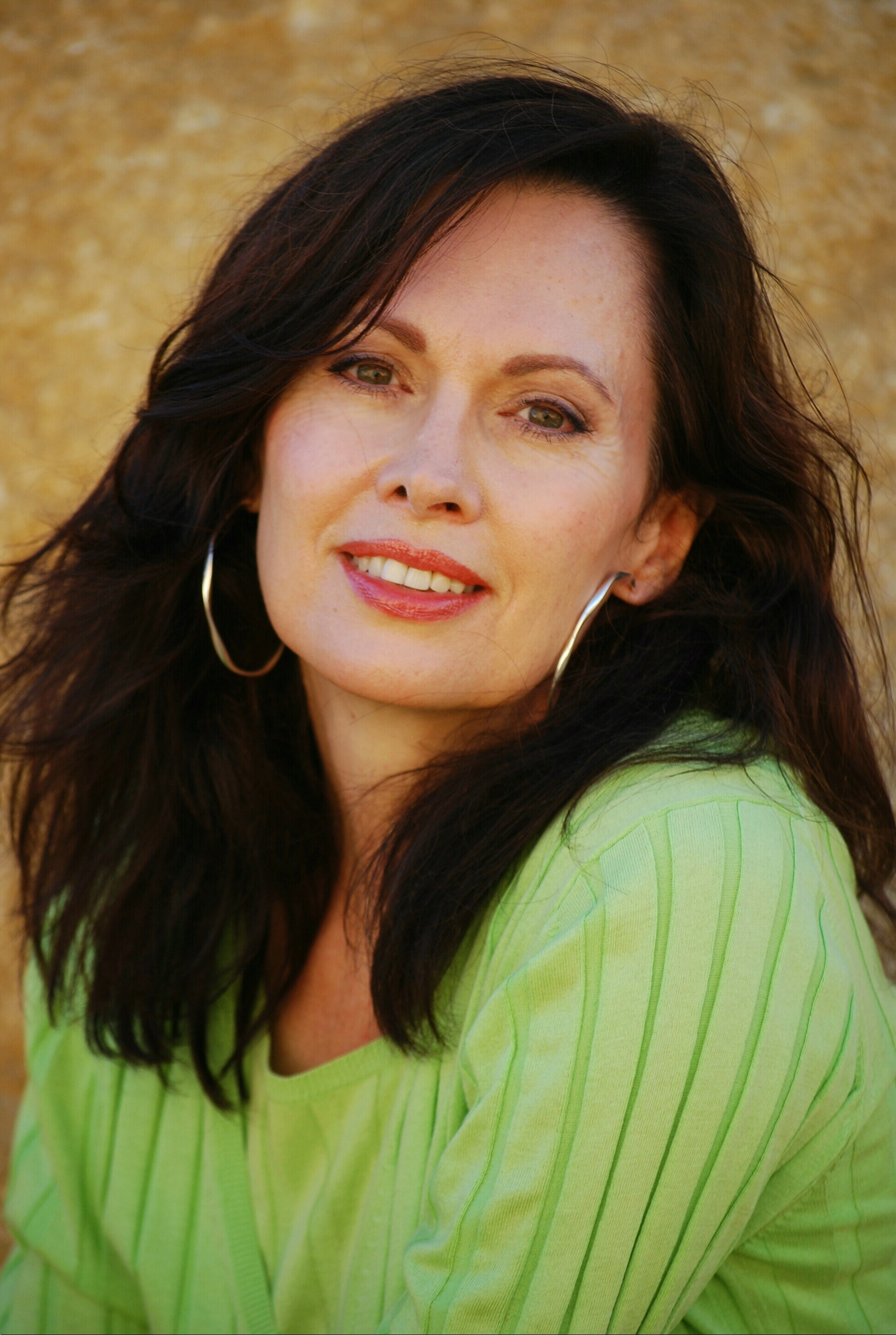
Miss Austria 1974
Evelyn Engleder

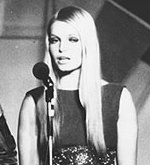
Miss Austria 1968
Eva Rueber-Staier

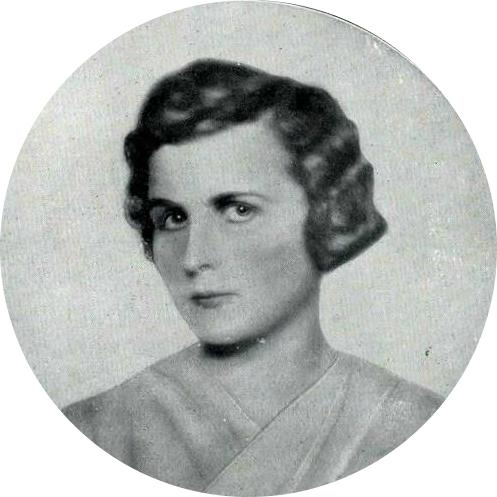
Miss Austria 1930
Ingeborg von Grienberger

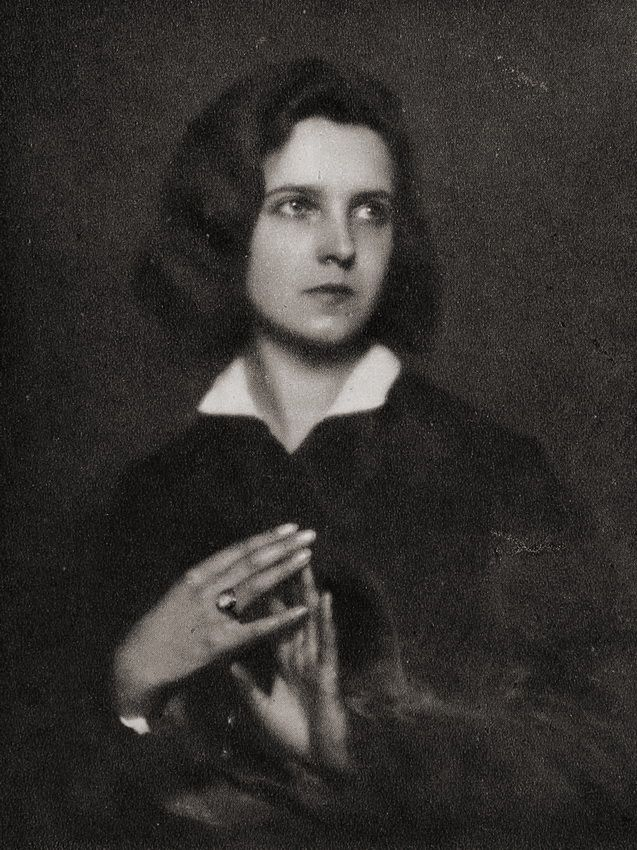
Miss Austria 1929
Lisl Goldarbeiter

== Big Four pageants representatives ==
The following women have represented Austria in the Big Four international beauty pageants, the four major international beauty pageants for women. These are Miss World, Miss Universe, Miss International and Miss Earth.

=== Miss Universe Austria ===
- : Declared as Winner
- : Ended as runner-up or top 5/6 qualification
- : Ended as one of the finalists or semifinalists
- : Ended as special awards winner

The Miss Austria competes at the Miss Universe pageant. Between 2005 and 2012, Austria did not participate at the Miss Universe pageant due to lack of sponsorship. In 2013, Miss Austria Organization regained the license to compete at the Miss Universe pageant. In 2018, the organization returned the local franchise to the MUO organization.

Year	Province	Miss Austria	Placement at Miss Universe	Special Award(s)	Notes
1952	Vorarlberg	Inge Freuis	Did not compete		
1953	Vienna	Lore Felger	Top 16		Illustrierte Kronen Zeitung Agency
1954	Did not compete				
1955	—	Edith Philipp	Did not compete		
1956	Vienna	Traudl Eichinger	Did not compete		
1957	Vienna	Hannerl Melcher	Top 16		Erich Reindl Directorship
1958	Vienna	Johanna "Hanni" Ehrenstrasser	Did not compete		
1959	Vienna	Christine "Christl" Spazier	Unplaced		
1960	Vienna	Elisabeth "Sissy" Hodacs	2nd Runner-up		
1961	Vorarlberg	Ingrid Bayer	Unplaced		
1962	Vienna	Christa Ingrid Linder	Top 15		
1963	Vienna	Gertraud Bergler	Top 15		
1964	Vienna	Gloria "Gigi" Mackh	Unplaced		
1965	Lower Austria	Carin Ingberg Schmidt	Unplaced	Miss Photogenic	
1966	Vienna	Renate Polacek	Unplaced		
1967	Vorarlberg	Christina "Christl" Bartu	Unplaced		
1968	Lower Austria	Brigitte Krüger	Unplaced		
1969	Styria	Eva Rueber-Staier	Top 12		Later won Miss World 1969
1970	Upper Austria	Elfriede "Eva" Kurz	Unplaced		
1971	Vienna	Edeltraud Neubauer	Unplaced		
1972	Carinthia	Ursula "Uschi" Pacher	Unplaced		
1973	Styria	Roswitha Kobald	Unplaced		
1974	Vienna	Evelyn Maria Engleder	Unplaced		
1975	Lower Austria	Rosemarie Holzschuh	Unplaced		
1976	Upper Austria	Heidi-Marie Passian	Unplaced		
1977	Vorarlberg	Eva Maria Düringer	1st Runner-up		
1978	Vorarlberg	Doris Elizabeth Anwander	Unplaced		
1979	Styria	Karin Zorn	Unplaced		
1980	Vienna	Isabel Stefanie Müller	Unplaced		
1981	Vienna	Gudrun Gollob	Unplaced		
1982	Styria	Elisabeth Kawan	Unplaced		
1983	Styria	Mercedes Stermitz	Unplaced		
1984	Vorarlberg	Michaela Nussbaumer	Unplaced		
1985	Vienna	Martina Margarete Haiden	Unplaced		
1986	Upper Austria	Manuela Redtenbacher	Unplaced		2nd Runner-up
1987	Vienna	Kristina Sebestyen	Unplaced		
1988	Lower Austria	Maria Steinhart	Unplaced		
1989	Vienna	Bettina Berghold	Unplaced		
1990	Vienna	Sandra Luttenberger	Unplaced		
1991	Vienna	Regina Kozak	Did not compete		
1992	Vienna	Karin Friedl	Unplaced		Emil Bauer Directorship
1993	Vienna	Rosemary Bruckner	Unplaced		
1994	Styria	Kerstin Sattler	Did not compete		
Did not compete between 1995—1998
1999	Vienna	Katja Giebner	Unplaced		
2000	—	Simone Smrekar	Did not compete		
Did not compete between 2001—2002
2003	Lower Austria	Céline Roscheck	Did not compete		
2004	Vienna	Daniela Strigl	Unplaced		Vladimir Kraljević (Miss Universe Croatia Organization) Directorship
Did not compete between 2005—2012
2013	Upper Austria	Doris Hofmann	Unplaced		Silvia Schachermayer Directorship
2014	Upper Austria	Julia Furdea	Unplaced		
2015	Vorarlberg	Amina Dagi	Unplaced		Appointed as "Miss Universe Austria 2015" after the Miss Austria 2015 allocated to Miss World – Amina Dagi was Miss Austria 2012
2016	Upper Austria	Dajana Dzinic	Unplaced		Received the title of "Miss Universe Austria" in the Top 3 finale
2017	Lower Austria	Celine Schrenk	Unplaced		
2018	Vorarlberg	Izabela Ion	Did not compete		
2019	Styria	Larissa Robitschko	Did not compete		
Did not compete between 2020—2025
2026	Vienna	Victoria Amerson	Did not compete		Appointed as "Miss Universe Austria 2026" after the death of Miss Austria 2024, Lucia Sisic

=== Miss World Austria ===
- : Declared as Winner
- : Ended as runner-up or top 5/6 qualification
- : Ended as one of the finalists or semifinalists
- : Ended as special awards winner

At least between 1985 and 1989, the Austrian Miss World contestant was chosen not in the Miss Austria contest, but a different contest named Miss World Österreich and organized by Lilo Hoffmann.

Year	Province	Miss World Austria	Placement at Miss World	Special Award(s)	Notes
1953	Vienna	Lore Felger	Did not compete		
1954	Did not compete				
1955	Vienna	Felicitas (von) Goebel	Top 8		
1956	—	Margaret Scherz	Unplaced		Runner-up / Appointed
1957	—	Lilo Fischer	Unplaced		Runner-up / Appointed
1958	Vienna	Elisabeth "Sissy" Schübel-Auer	Did not compete		
1959	—	Helga Knofel	Unplaced		Runner-up / Appointed
1960	Salzburg	Luise Kammermeier	Did not compete		
1961	—	Hella Wolfsgruber	Top 15		Runner-up / Appointed
1962	Vienna	Inge Jaklin	Unplaced		Runner-up / Appointed
1963	—	Sonja Russ	Unplaced		Runner-up / Appointed
1964	Vienna	Viktoria "Dorli" Lazek	Unplaced		
1965	—	Ingrid Kopetzky	Unplaced		Runner-up / Appointed
1966	Lower Austria	Eva "Evi" Rieck	Did not compete		
1967	Vorarlberg	Christina "Christl" Bartu	Unplaced		
1968	Lower Austria	Brigitte Krüger	Top 15		
1969	Styria	Eva Rueber-Staier	Miss World 1969		
1970	—	Rosemarie Resch	Unplaced		Runner-up / Appointed
1971	—	Waltraud Lucas	Top 15		Runner-up / Appointed
1972	Carinthia	Ursula "Uschi" Pacher	3rd Runner-up		
1973	Styria	Roswitha Kobald	Unplaced		
1974	Vienna	Evelyn Maria Engleder	Unplaced		
1975	Lower Austria	Rosemarie Holzschuh	Unplaced		
1976	Lower Austria	Monika Mühlbauer	Unplaced		Runner-up
1977	Vorarlberg	Eva Maria Düringer	Top 15		
1978	Vorarlberg	Doris Elizabeth Anwander	Top 15		
1979	Styria	Karin Zorn	6th Runner-up		
1980	Styria	Sonya-Maria Schlepp	Top 15		4th Runner-up
1981	Vorarlberg	Beatrix Kopf	Unplaced		4th Runner-up
1982	Vienna	Rita Isabella Zehetner	Did not compete		
1983	Styria	Mercedes Stermitz	Top 15		
1984	Upper Austria	Heidemarie Pilgerstorfer	Top 15		Runner-up / Appointed
1985	Salzburg	Gabriele Maxonus	Unplaced		Elected in Miss World Österreich contest
1986	Vienna	Chantal Schreiber	2nd Runner-up		Elected in Miss World Österreich contest
1987	Styria	Ulla Weigerstorfer	Miss World 1987		Elected in Miss World Österreich contest
1988	Vienna	Alexandra Werbanschitz	Top 15		Elected in Miss World Österreich contest
1989	Vorarlberg	Marion Amann	Unplaced		Elected in Miss World Österreich contest
1990	Vienna	Carina Friedberger	Unplaced		Runner-up / Appointed
1991	Vienna	Andrea Isabella Pfeiffer	Unplaced		Runner-up / Appointed
1992	Vienna	Kerstin Kinberg	Unplaced		Runner-up / Appointed
1993	Carinthia	Jutta Ellinger	Unplaced		Runner-up / Appointed
1994	Vienna	Bianca Engel	Unplaced		Runner-up / Appointed
1995	Vienna	Elizabeth Unfried	Unplaced		Runner-up / Appointed
1996	Vienna	Bettina Buxbaumer	Unplaced		Runner-up / Appointed
1997	Tyrol	Susanne Nagele	Unplaced		
1998	Upper Austria	Sabine Lindorfer	Unplaced		
1999	Vorarlberg	Sandra Kölbl	Unplaced		
2000	Upper Austria	Patricia Kaiser	Unplaced		
2001	Upper Austria	Daniela Rockenschaub	Unplaced		
2002	Lower Austria	Céline Roscheck	Did not compete		
2003	Vorarlberg	Bianca Zudrell	Did not compete		
2003	Vienna	Tanja Duhovich	Did not compete		
2004	Upper Austria	Silvia Hackl	Did not compete		
2005	Salzburg	Isabella Stangl	Did not compete		
2006	Vienna	Tatjana Batinić	Unplaced		
2007	Lower Austria	Christine Reiler	Top 16		
2008	Styria	Kathrin Krahfuss	Unplaced		Runner-up
2009	Upper Austria	Anna Hammel	Unplaced		
2010	Carinthia	Valentina Schlager	Did not compete		
2011	Vienna	Julia Hofer	Unplaced		Runner-up / Appointed
2012	Vorarlberg	Amina Dagi	Unplaced		Later Miss Universe Austria 2015
2013	Tyrol	Ena Kadic	Unplaced		
2014	Upper Austria	Julia Furdea	Unplaced		
2015	Upper Austria	Annika Grill	Unplaced		
2016	Lower Austria	Dragana Stanković	Unplaced	Miss World Sport (Top 24)	
2017	Vienna	Sarah Chvala	Unplaced		Received the title of "Miss World Austria" in the Top 3 finale
2018	Vorarlberg	Izabela Ion	Unplaced		Selected as the new Miss Austria 2018; Ion previously placed as the 1st Runner-up
2019	Styria	Larissa Robitschko	Did not compete		
Did not compete between 2021—2025

=== Miss Earth Austria ===
- : Declared as Winner
- : Ended as runner-up or top 5/6 qualification
- : Ended as one of the finalists or semifinalists
- : Ended as special awards winner

Beginning in 2016, Miss Earth Austria became a major title of Miss Austria Organization. In 2018 the Miss Earth Austria moved to another franchise holder.

Year	Province	Miss Earth Austria	Placement at Miss Earth	Special Award(s)	Notes
2016	Vienna	Kimberly Budinsky	Unplaced		Received the title of "Miss Earth Austria" in the Top 3 finale
2017	Upper Austria	Bianca Kronsteiner	Unplaced		Received the title of "Miss Earth Austria" in the Top 3 finale

== See also ==
- Miss Germany
- Miss France
- Miss Switzerland
