= Amina Dagi =

Russian-Austrian model and beauty pageant titleholder

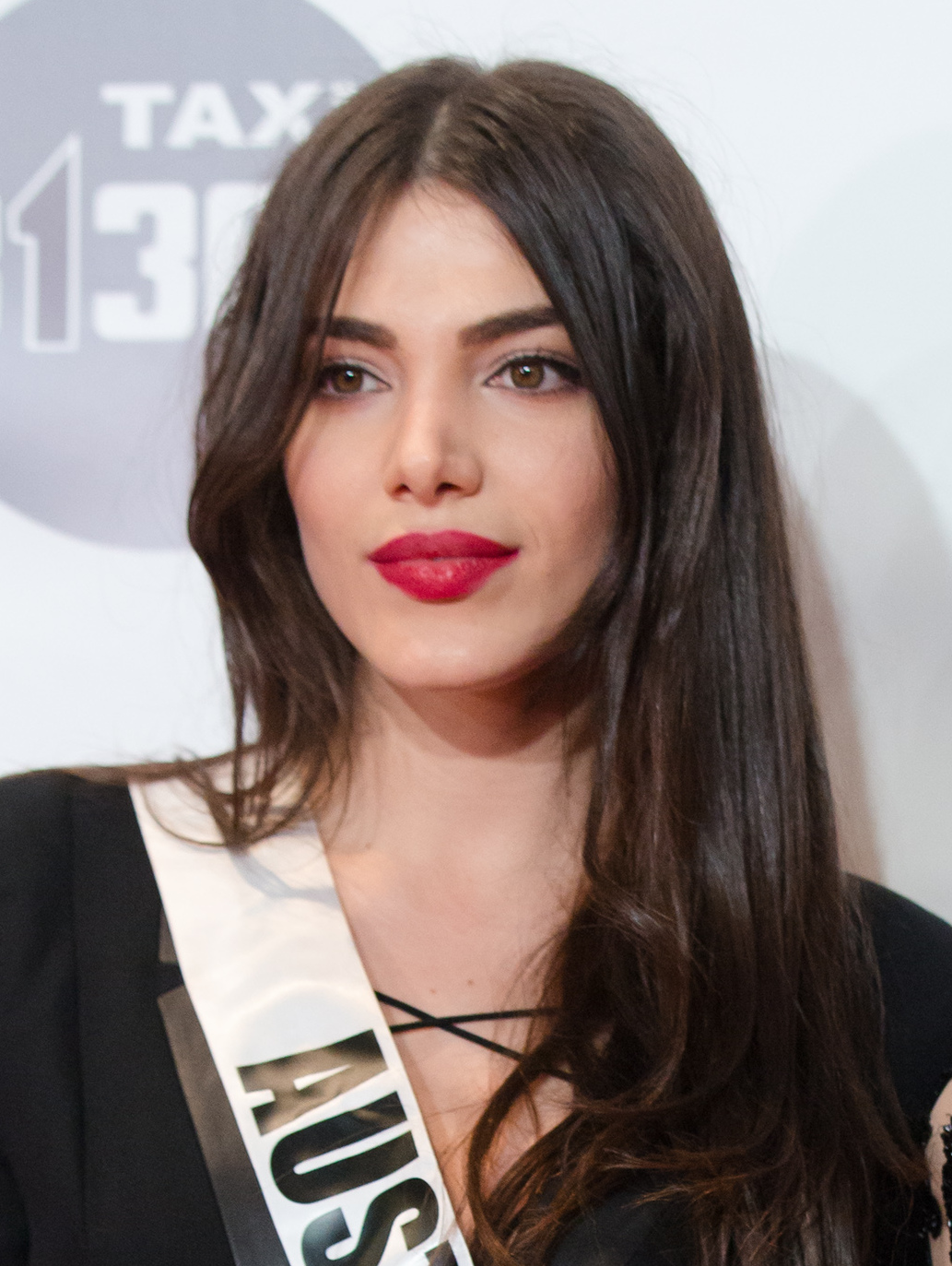
- Amina Dagi during Filmball Vienna 2016
- Born: Amina Mirzakhanova; 12 February 1995 (age 31); Makhachkala, Dagestan, Russia
- Height: 1.75 m (5 ft 9 in)
- Beauty pageant titleholder
- Title: Miss Austria 2012
- Hair color: Brown
- Eye color: Hazel
- Major competitions: Miss Austria 2012 (Winner); Miss World 2012 (Unplaced); Miss Universe 2015 (Unplaced)

Amina Dagi (born Amina Mirzakhanova; Russian: Амина Мирзаханова; 12 February 1995) is a Russian-Austrian model and beauty pageant titleholder who was crowned Miss Austria 2012. She competed at the Miss World 2012 pageant and was appointed Miss Universe Austria 2015 after Annika Grill resigned from Miss Universe 2015 due to competing at Miss World 2015. Dagi then represented her country at the Miss Universe 2015 pageant.

== Personal life ==
Dagi was born in Makhachkala, Dagestan in the North Caucasus of Russia. Following the death of her father, the family immigrated to Austria in 2003, settling in Bludenz. They later received Austrian citizenship and changed their surname to Dagi, due to the often misspellings and mispronunciations of their original surname; taking the name Dagi was meant to honor their homeland of Dagestan. Dagi worked at Zusammen:Österreich prior to becoming Miss Austria, and graduated from BG Bludenz. She became first runner-up at Miss Vorarlberg 2012, which qualified her for the Miss Austria final of the same year.

=== Miss Austria 2012 ===
On 30 March 2012 Amina was crowned Miss Austria 2012 at the Casino Baden while representing Vorarlberg. She competed at the Miss World 2012 pageant in China, and did not place in the semi-finals.

=== Appointed as Miss Universe Austria 2015 ===
On 15 October 2015 Miss Universe Austria 2015 Annika Grill was replaced by Dagi after Grill announced that she could not compete at the Miss Universe 2015 pageant due to being the Austrian representative for Miss World 2015. She competed at the Miss Universe 2015 pageant in Las Vegas on 20 December 2015 but failed to advance to Top 15.

Awards and achievements
| Preceded by Julia Furdea | Miss Universe Austria; 2015 | Succeeded by Dajana Dzinic |

Awards and achievements
| Preceded by Carmen Stamboli | Miss Austria; 2012 | Succeeded by Ena Kadic |
