= Bosnian Austrians =

Ethnic group in Austria

Bosnian Austrians Bosanski Austrijanci
Total population
- 223,000 (2023)

Regions with significant populations
- Vienna, Graz, Salzburg, Linz, Wels, Villach, Klagenfurt

Languages
- Bosnian · Serbian · Croatian · Austrian German

Religion
- Sunni Islam, Orthodox Christianity, Roman Catholicism

Related ethnic groups
- Other South Slavic peoples

Bosnian Austrians are citizens of Austria whose ancestry can be traced to Bosnia and Herzegovina. The vast majority of Bosnians emigrated to Austria during and after the Bosnian War of the 1990s, though a large number emigrated as early as the 19th century.

== Communities ==
The largest Bosnian communities in Austria are found in Vienna, Graz, Linz and Wels; followed by Salzburg, Villach and Klagenfurt.

In June 2013, the city of Wels inaugurated Platz der Bosniaken — Trg Bošnjaka square, located in front of the Bosnian Austrian Cultural Center, as a gesture of recognition and appreciation for the Bosnian community in Austria. Just seven years later, in 2020, the first woman of Bosnian descent, Alma Zadić, a lawyer and politician of the Green party, was sworn in as the Minister of Justice of Austria.

== Demographics ==
According to the population census 2014 conducted by "Statistik Austria" (Austrian federal agency for statistics), the total number of people of Bosnian descent in Austria was 155,050. It comprised 1.9% of the total population. As of 2023, some 46,000 Bosnians lived in Vienna.

== Notable people ==
- Adis Jašić, footballer
- Alen Orman, footballer
- Alma Zadić, lawyer and politician of the Green Party who has been serving as Minister of Justice
- Amar Dedić, footballer
- Amer Hrustanović, wrestler
- Anel Hadžić, footballer
- Azra Aksamija, artist and architectural historian
- Boris Nemšić, businessman and the former CEO of Telekom Austria
- Deniz Mujić, footballer
- Edin Salkić, handball player
- Emir Dilaver, footballer
- Enisa Kadić, Miss Austria 2013
- Haris Bukva, footballer
- Irfan Škiljan, inventor of IrfanView
- Ivona Dadic, track and field athlete of Bosnian Croat descent.
- Madita, singer
- Mirela Dedić, handball player
- Muharem Huskovic, footballer
- Nina Kusturica, film director
- Oliver Lukić, footballer
- Sanel Kuljić, footballer
- Smail Balić, historian
- Sena Jurinac, soprano
- Zlatko Junuzović, footballer

== See also ==
- Austria–Bosnia and Herzegovina relations
- Immigration to Austria
- Diaspora studies
- Bosniaks
- Bosnians
- Die Bosniaken Kommen
