= Palazu =

Palazu may refer to one of two villages in Constanța County, Romania:

- Palazu Mare, a village in Constanța city
- Palazu Mic, a village in Mihail Kogălniceanu Commune
