= Julia Furdea =

Austrian model (born 1994)

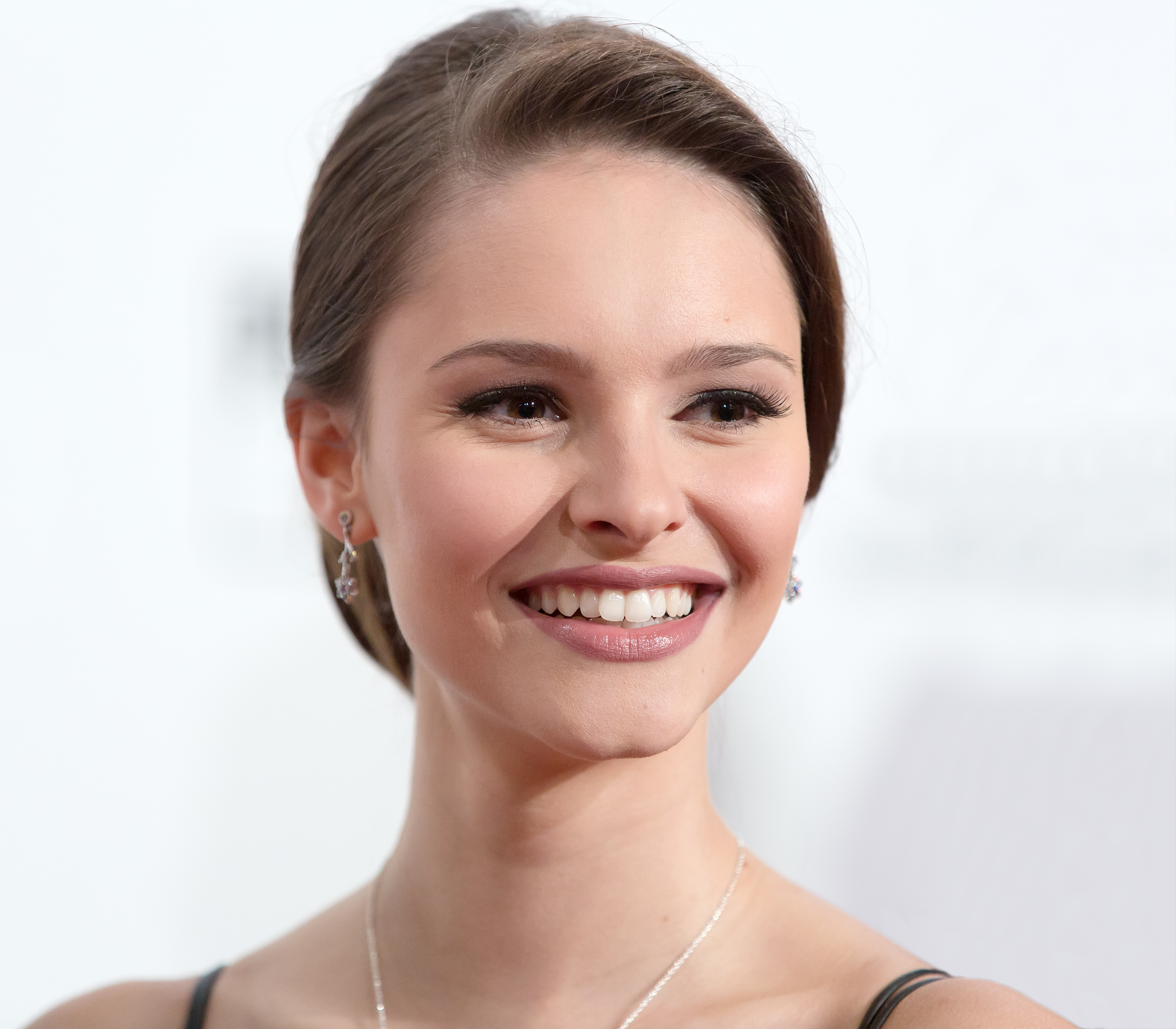
- Born: Julia Furdea; 19 July 1994 (age 32); Timișoara, Romania
- Height: 1.70 m (5 ft 7 in)
- Beauty pageant titleholder
- Title: Miss Oberösterreich 2014; Miss Austria 2014
- Hair color: Brown
- Eye color: Brown
- Major competitions: Miss Austria 2014 (Winner); Miss World 2014; (Unplaced); Miss Universe 2014; (Unplaced)

Julia Furdea (born 19 July 1994) is a Romanian-Austrian model and beauty pageant titleholder who was crowned Miss Austria 2014 and represented her country at both Miss World 2014 in London and Miss Universe 2014 in Doral.

== Early life ==
Furdea studied at the University of Vienna. Besides her modeling career, She is a radio host at the biggest private radio station Kronehit, and also hosts events such as the International Gala Judo Federation. She is the niece of the Romanian former rugby union player Adrian Pllotschi.

== Pageantry ==
=== Miss Oberösterreich 2014 ===
Furdea was crowned as Miss Oberösterreich 2014 from Asten. Doris Hofmann as the reigning queen from the province crowned her as the new winner.

=== Miss Austria 2014 ===
Furdea was crowned as Miss Austria 2014 represented Upper Austria at the Casino Baden near Vienna on 3 July 2014. The reigning Miss Universe 2013, Gabriela Isler was judging at the pageant together with Miss World 2009, Kaiane Aldorino.

Julia represented Austria at the Miss World 2014 and Miss Universe 2014 but she finished unplaced.

=== Moderation and model ===
Since September 2018, she has joined the team of Austria's first breakfast television show Cafe Puls on Puls 4, where she presents the weather. She also hosts the station's first children's cooking show Das jüngste Gericht.

Awards and achievements
Preceded by Doris Hofmann	Miss Universe Austria; 2014	Succeeded by Amina Dagi

Awards and achievements
Preceded by Ena Kadic	Miss Austria; 2014	Succeeded by Annika Grill
