= Eva Maria Düringer Cavalli =

Austrian fashion designer

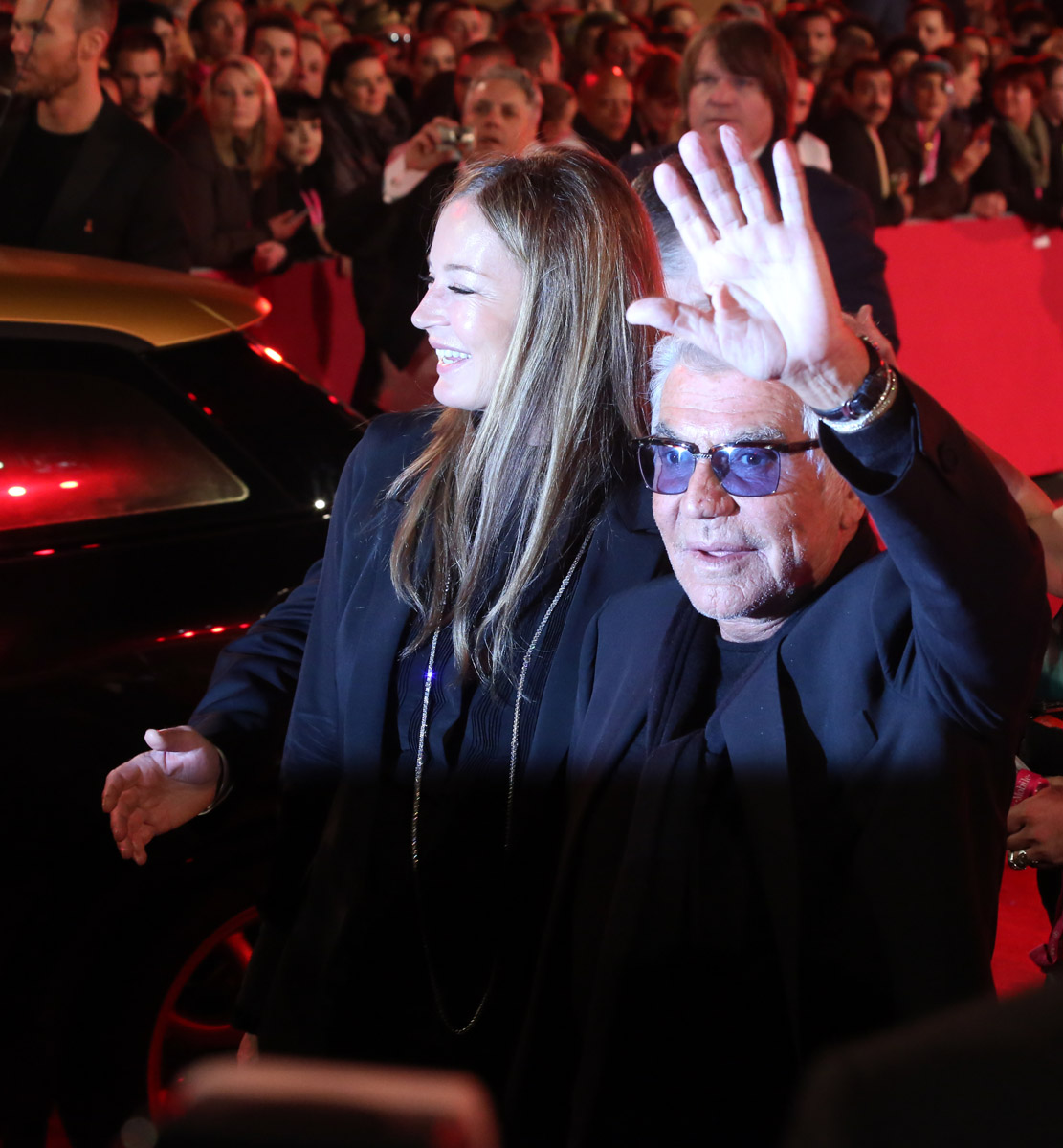
- Eva and Roberto Cavalli in 2013
- Born: Eva Maria Düringer; Lake Constance, Bodensee, Austria
- Occupation: Co-creative director of Cavalli brands
- Children: 3
- Awards: Miss Austria 1977; Miss Europe 1978/1977

Eva Maria Düringer Cavalli (born 9 October 1959 as Eva Maria Düringer, and sometimes referred to as Eva Cavalli) is an Austrian fashion designer and beauty pageant titleholder who was crowned Miss Austria 1977 and Miss Europe 1978/1977. She was also previously the co-creative director for Cavalli brands. Cavalli and her husband Roberto Cavalli divorced in 2010.

== Biography ==
She was born at Lake Constance, Bodensee, Austria. Her parents are Frieda Koenig and Anton Düringer. At 17 years old, she won the title of Miss Austria. She was the youngest participant to hold the crown. She attended the Miss Universe pageant in 1977, where she was placed first runner-up, placing first runner up makes the highest placement in her country's Miss Universe, and the Miss World pageant in 1977, where she reached the semi-finals. She also attended the Miss Europe 1977 pageant and was crowned as the winner. In 1980, she married a jury member of Miss Universe, Italian leather designer Roberto Cavalli. The couple had three children together and their main residence was in Florence until their divorce in 2010.
