= Adrian Pllotschi =

Romanian rugby union player and coach

- Born: 26 October 1959 (age 67) Mihail Kogălniceanu, Romania
- Height: 178 cm (5 ft 10 in)
- Weight: 76 kg (168 lb)
- Notable relative: Julia Furdea (niece)

Rugby union career
- Position: Wing
Youth career
- 1976-1979: Club Sportiv Școlar 2 Constanța
Senior career
| Years | Team | Apps | (Points) |
| 1979-1990 | Farul Constanța | | |
International career
| Years | Team | Apps | (Points) |
| 1980–1990 | Romania | 3 | (0) |
Coaching career
- Years: Team
- 1990-2000: Farul Constanța (youth team)
- 2000-2005: Club Sportiv Școlar 2
- 2005-2006: Farul Constanța (youth team)
- 2006-2010: Clubul Sportiv Școlar 2
- 2010-: L.P.S. Constanța

Adrian Pllotschi (born 26 October 1959) in Mihail Kogălniceanu, is a former Romanian rugby union football player and currently coach. He played as a wing. He is the uncle of the Romanian-Austrian Miss World 2014 contestant for Austria Julia Furdea.

== Club career ==
Pllotschi played for Farul Constanța during his career.

== International career ==
Pllotschi gathered 3 caps for Romania, from his debut in 1987 to his last game in 1990. He was a member of his national side for the 1st Rugby World Cup in 1987 and played in the group match against Scotland, at Dunedin, on 2 June 1987.

== Honours ==
Farul Constanța

- Cupa României: 1990-91, 1993–94
