= Eva Rueber-Staier =

Austrian model, actress, presenter, and beauty queen (born 1949)

- Rueber-Staier in 1969
- Born: 1949 (age 76–77); Bruck an der Mur, Austria
- Other name: Eva Cowan
- Occupations: Actress; Model; TV host Beauty queen
- Years active: 1969–1983

Eva Rueber-Staier (born 1949) is an Austrian actress, television host, model and beauty queen who won Miss World 1969.

== Biography ==
Rueber-Staier was born in 1949 in Bruck an der Mur, Styria. She won the title of Miss Austria and participated in the Miss Universe 1969 contest, in which she was a top 15 semi-finalist. She also went on to win the Miss World 1969 pageant. During her tenure, she starred in the Bob Hope USO tour in South Vietnam.

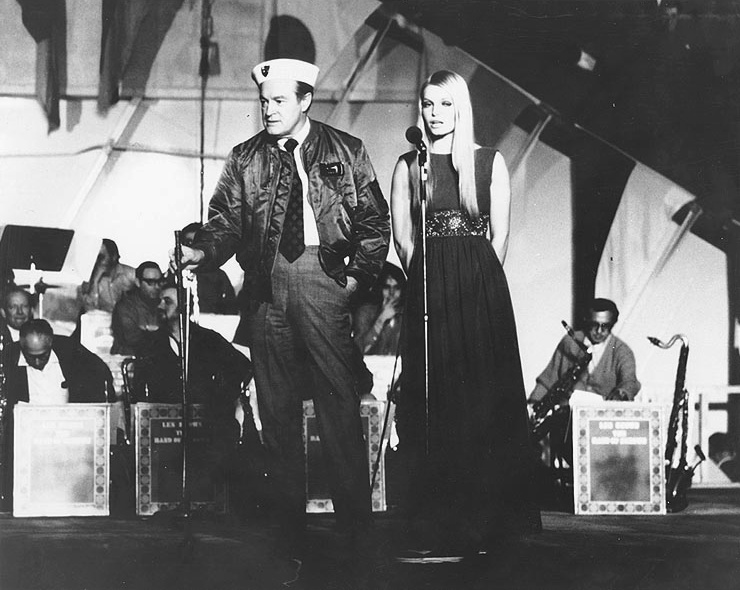
Eva Rueber-Staier with Bob Hope during a USO tour on USS Saratoga

She played a skiing Cadbury Flake girl in a 1971 ad directed by Ridley Scott.

In 1972, she co-presented the nine weekly episodes of Animal Stars with Tony Soper on BBC1, a series about popular animals like penguins, seals, and dolphins.

Her acting career contains a recurring James Bond credit: she played General Gogol's assistant Rublevitch in the films The Spy Who Loved Me, For Your Eyes Only, and Octopussy. She also has a minor role in Carry On Dick, one of the later in the Carry On film series.

Eva Rueber-Staier married British film director Ronald Fouracre at the Caxton Hall register office on 2 January 1973. They were married until her husband's death on 2 July 1983.

She has lived in an Elizabethan Grade II listed house in Pinner since 1984 and moved there when she was expecting her first and only child, Ronald's son Alexander Fouracre, who lives in Willesden Green and works as a camera man. She later lived with her second husband, publisher Brian Cowan.

Rueber-Staier has produced metalwork sculptures; some were exhibited during Hertfordshire Visual Arts Forum's "open studios 2008".

== Filmography ==
Year	Title	Role	Notes
1969	The New Adventures of Snow White	Cinderella	
1974	Doctor at Sea	Anna-Marie	episode 4: 'The Senior Officer's Perks'
1974	Carry On Dick	Birds of Paradise Entertainer	credited as Eva Reuber-Staier
1975	Space: 1999	Jane	series 1, episode 2: 'Force of Life'
1976	The Slipper and the Rose	Princess #4	credited as Eva Reuber-Staier
1976	The Chiffy Kids	Ringmaster	episode 6: 'Magpie Lays an Egg', credited as Eva Reuber-Staier
1976	The New Avengers		Episode: 'The House of Cards'
1977	The Spy Who Loved Me	Rublevitch	
1981	For Your Eyes Only	Rublevitch	
1983	Octopussy	Rublevitch	final film role

Awards and achievements
Preceded by (Australia) Penelope Plummer	Miss World; 1969	Succeeded by (Grenada) Jennifer Hosten
