= Doris Hofmann =

Austrian model (born 1990)

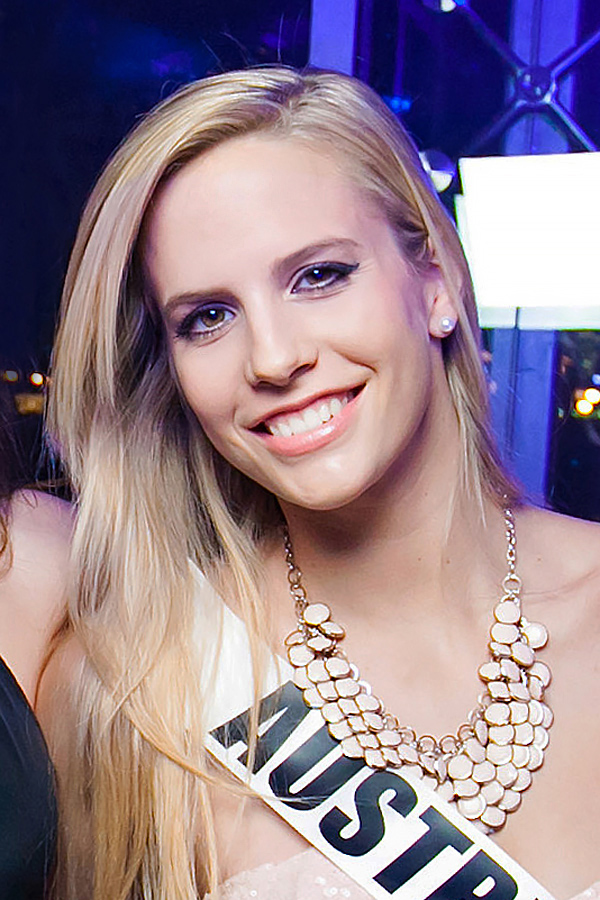
- Born: Doris Hofmann; 1990 (age 35–36); Steyr, Austria
- Height: 1.73 m (5 ft 8 in)
- Beauty pageant titleholder
- Title: Miss Oberösterreich 2013; Miss Universe Austria 2013
- Hair color: Blonde
- Eye color: Green
- Major competitions: Miss Austria 2013 (1st Runner-up); Miss Universe 2013 (Unplaced)

Doris Hofmann (born 1990) is an Austrian model and beauty pageant titleholder who designated as Miss Universe Austria 2013. She represented her country at Miss Universe 2013.

== Miss Austria 2013 ==
Doris placed as the 1st Runner-up at the Miss Austria 2013.

== Designated ==
Doris Hofmann was selected to represent Austria at the Miss Universe 2013, held in Moscow, Russia on 9 November where she failed to place in Top 16. Doris was a first runner-up in Miss Österreich 2013 pageant.

Awards and achievements
Preceded by Daniela Strigl	Miss Universe Austria; 2013	Succeeded by Julia Furdea
