= Kathrin Krahfuss =

Austrian beauty pageant contestant

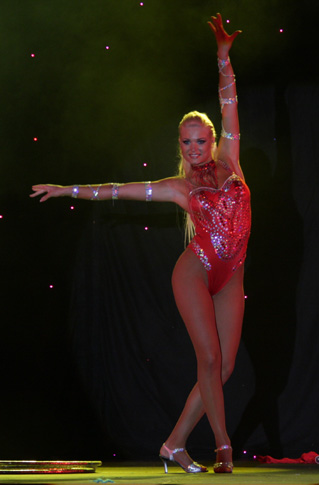
- Born: Kathrin Krahfuss; November 3, 1984 (age 41); Graz, Austria
- Height: 177 cm (5 ft 10 in)
- Beauty pageant titleholder
- Title: Miss Styria 2008; Miss World Austria 2008
- Hair color: blonde
- Eye color: blue

Kathrin Krahfuss (born November 3, 1984) is an Austrian beauty pageant contestant and circus acrobat who represented Austria in Miss World 2008 in South Africa. She is a freelance artist. She spent four years with the Golden Circus and two with the Circus Picard.

Krahfuss won the title of Myss Styria in 2008 and ranked second in the subsequent final of Miss Austria 2008.
