= Hamid Tamjidi =

Iranian writer, film director, and producer

- حمید تمجیدی
- Born: Tehran, Iran
- Education: College of Film and Television
- Occupations: Film actor, film director
- Website: kasrafilm.com

Hamid Tamjidi (Persian: حمید تمجیدی. Born 1956) is an Iranian writer, film director, and producer.

== Early life ==
Tamjidi was born in Tehran and graduated with a degree in film editing from Seda v Sima University. He has four children - Larisa, Kasra, Nakisa, and Parsa. His oldest son, Kasra, has appeared in some of his films.

== Early career ==
He made his first film The Burnt Twigs as part of his thesis. Then he was hired by the Iran TV network as the official film editor. Two years later he started to work as a writer and director for the same organization. One of his first documentaries Doragh Pond won several awards and a year after he began his first TV series Agate based on his screenplay. In 1987 his short documentary Call of the Pond won the jury's special award at the Fajr International film festival. At that time he established his film company KASRAFILM and produced and directed several more films. He made six films, TV series, and more than fifty documentaries.

Among Tamjidi's most popular films were the documentary films Tree (1982), Hur 'e Doragh (1983 & winner for best documentary at the third Fajr international film festival) Call of the Pond (1986 winner of the jury's special award at the sixth Fajr international film festival).

The TV series he wrote and directed are The Map (1986), Agate (1988), Learning for Living (1991), Wages of Fear (1992), Playing with Death (1995), and Tell Him That I Love Him (1999).

The feature films that he wrote directed and produced: The Burnt Twigs (1977), The Mirage (1986), The Rose (1989), Dear Wednesday (1992), Playing with Death (1995), and Endless Night (1999).

His last movie The Endless Night was banned from public screening and he couldn't continue his work for years. In 2006 he immigrated to Canada and now lives in NB. In 2007 he wrote his first English screenplay, Saffron. In 2016 he made his first movie The Bird May Die in Canada and won several major awards from international film festivals such as the Chandler International Film Festival, Alaska International Film Festival, Depth of Field International Film Festival Competition, Hollywood Film Competition, International Independent Film Awards, Los Angeles Film Awards, European Cinematography AWARDS (ECA).

== Filmography ==
Movies

- The Burnt Twigs, 1977
- The Mirage, 1986
- The Rose , 1989
- Dear Wednesday, 1992
- Playing with Death, 1995
- Endless Night, 1999
- The bird May Die, 2016

TV series

- Tree, 1982
- Hur'e Doragh, 1983
- Call of the Pound, 1986
- Aghigh, 1988
- Wages of Fear, 1992
- Playing with Death, 1995
- Tell Him That I Love Him, 1999
