= Nazan Saatci =

Turkish actress

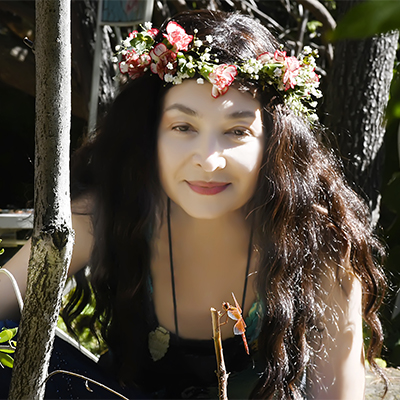
- Born: June 22, 1958 (age 67); Samsun, Turkey
- Education: University of Istanbul
- Occupation: Actress
- Years active: 1979–present

Nazan Saatci (born June 22, 1958) is a Turkish actress. She is known for her performances in Tokatçi (1983), Ölümsüz (1982), and Hulchal (1985). She was the second runner-up in Miss Asia Pacific beauty pageant in 1983.

== Early life and family ==
Saatci was born on June 22, 1958, in Samsun, Turkey. She has a degree in Turkish linguistics and literature from the University of Istanbul. After her cinema career, she has moved to California where she lives along with her family.

== Career ==
Saatci made her screen debut in Fakir (1979). Her first breakthrough as an actress was a Turkish TV play Tokatçi (1982). Her first Urdu movie Halchal was released on April 5, 1985 in Pakistani cinemas. From 1985 to 1988, she appeared in Lollywood movies Zanjeer, Manila ki bijliyan,Talash, and Badla. In 1995, she worked in an Iranian spy movie Playing with Death, filmed in Iran and Turkey.

Saatci was the second runner-up in Miss Europa 1978 (Unofficial Miss Europe 1978) which was held in Reggio Emilia, Italy. She was again the second runner-up in Miss Asia Pacific (1983) held in the Philippines and received the special award of "Miss Talent".

== Spiritual beliefs ==
Since 2008, Saatci became convinced that she had been experiencing one-to-one conversations with fairies. In 2011, she formed Fairy Voices, a non-profit organization, to share her spiritual experience. She claims to have some recorded fairy voices and images as evidence for an unseen fairy world.

== Filmography ==
Film performances
Year	Title	Role	Language	Notes
1979	Fakir	Ezo	Turkish	
1981	Hamayli Boynundayim		Turkish	
1981	Seviyorum Allahim		Turkish	
1982	Ölümsüz		Turkish	
1983	Kahreden Kursun	Ceren	Turkish	
1983	Bir Zamanlar Kardestiler	Cicek Ogretmen	Turkish	
1983	Tokatçi	Emine	Turkish	
1985	Hulchal	Leyla	Urdu	
1986	Zanjeer	Aashi	Urdu	
1986	Talash		Urdu	
1987	Manila Ki Bijlian	Sitara	Urdu	
1987	Badla	Shama	Urdu	
1987	Erkek Sevgisi	Nazo	Turkish	
1988	Shehanshah	Mary	Urdu/Punjabi	
1989	Toofani Bijlian	Nazan	Urdu	
1990	Abdulla from Minye 2	Feyza	Turkish	
1991	Acilar ve Arzular		Turkish	
1993	Sonbahar Aski	Jülide	Turkish	
1994	Kizimi Ariyorum		Turkish	
1995	Playing with Death	Meral	Persian	TV series
