= Playing with Death =

- Directed by: Hamid Tamjidi
- Written by: Maryam Bakhtiar; Hamid Tamjidi
- Produced by: Alireza Zarif(IRIBTelevision Channel 2)
- Starring: Abdolreza Akbari; Saleh Kermezi; Hamid Tamjidi; Bulent Polat; Berrin Topaloglu; Ahmad FaKhr
- Edited by: Hamid Tamjidi; Mitra Bakhtiar
- Music by: Mohammad Ahmadian
- Release date: 1995
- Running time: 120 mins
- Countries: Iran, Turkey
- Language: Persian

Playing with Death is a 1995 Iranian detective movie filmed in Iran and Turkey and produced by Alireza Zarif of 'IRIB Television'.

== Cast ==
- Abdolreza Akbari
- Ahmad Fakhr
- Mohammad Barsozian
- Hamid Tamjidi
- Hassan Shirzad
- Asqar Mohebi
- Larisa Tamjidi
- Cüneyt Arkın
- Salih Kırmızı
- Berrin Topaloğlu
- Bülent Polat
- Nazan Saatci
