= Miss Europe 1978 =

International beauty pageant

- Date: March 15, 1978
- Venue: Helsinki, Finland
- Entrants: 15
- Placements: 5
- Withdrawals: Cyprus, Denmark, Luxembourg, Malta, Scotland, [Wales, Yugoslavia
- Winner: Eva Maria Düringer; Austria

Miss Europe 1978, also sometimes referred to as Miss Europe 1977, was the 39th edition of the Miss Europe pageant and the 28th edition under the Mondial Events Organization. It was held in Helsinki, Finland on March 15, 1978. Eva Maria Düringer of Austria was crowned Miss Europe 1978/1977 by outgoing titleholder Riitta Inkeri Väisänen of Finland.

== Results ==
=== Placements ===
| Placement | Contestant |
|---|---|
| Miss Europe 1978 | Austria – Eva Düringer |
| 1st Runner-Up | Germany – Dagmar Winkler |
| 2nd Runner-Up | England – Sarah Louise Long |
| 3rd Runner-Up | Iceland – Guðbjörg Vilhjálmsdóttir |
| 4th Runner-Up | Finland – Maarit Ryhänen |

== Contestants ==
- Austria – Eva Düringer
- Belgium – Jacqueline Harmars
- England – Sarah Louise Long
- Finland – Maarit Ryhänen
- France – Véronique Fagot
- Germany – Dagmar Winkler
- Greece – Maria Spantidaki
- Holland – Caroline Hooft
- Iceland – Guðbjörg (Gudbjörg) Vilhjálmsdóttir
- Ireland – Lorraine Bernadette Enriquez
- Italy – Emanuela Goggia
- Norway – Åshild Ottesen
- Spain – Guillermina Ruiz-Doménech
- Sweden – Evonne Wilhelmsson
- Switzerland – Gaby Bosshard

== Notes ==
=== Withdrawals ===
- Cyprus
- Denmark
- Luxembourg
- Malta
- Scotland
- Wales
- Yugoslavia

== "Comité Officiel et International Miss Europe" Competition ==
Miss Europa 1978
- Date: September 11, 1978
- Venue: Reggio Emilia, Italy
- Entrants: 22
- Placements: 3
- Debuts: Malta
- Withdrawals: Iceland, Luxembourg & Spain
- Returns: Czechoslovakia, England, Greece, Ireland, Poland, Scotland Yugoslavia
- Winner: Barbara-Ann Neefs (Netherlands) Holland

From 1951 to 2002 there was a rival Miss Europe competition organized by the "Comité Officiel et International Miss Europe". This was founded in 1950 by Jean Raibaut in Paris, the headquarters later moved to Marseille. The winners wore different titles like Miss Europe, Miss Europa or Miss Europe International.

This year, the contest took place in Reggio Emilia, Italy on September 11, 1978. There 22 contestants all representing different countries and regions of Europe. At the end, Barbara-Ann Neefs of Holland was crowned as Miss Europa 1978. She succeeded predecessor Maria Teresa Maldonado Valle of Spain.

=== Placements ===
| Final results | Contestant |
|---|---|
| Miss Europa 1978 | Holland – Barbara-Ann Neefs |
| 1st runner-up | Norway – Helene Hornfeldt |
| 2nd runner-up | Turkey – Nazan Saatçi |

=== Contestants ===
- Andorra – Marlene Sanchez
- Austria – Monique DeHavilland
- Belgium – Christine Oset
- Czechoslovakia – Helena Henrikssonova
- Denmark – Christina Petersen
- England – Robina Sharpe
- Finland – Anne Marite Erkkila
- France – Danielle Borchio
- Germany – Simone Gorczak
- Greece – Fani Griba
- Holland – Barbara-Ann Neefs
- Ireland – Janet Gilbey
- Italy – UNKNOWN
- Malta – Marika Spiteri
- Monaco – Sylvie Parera
- Norway – Helene Hornfeldt
- Poland – Vokosava Andielkovic
- Scotland – Joanna Woolger
- Sweden – Katarina Malmros
- Switzerland – Katherina Hasenknopf
- Turkey – Nazan Saatçi
- Yugoslavia – Milena Omerzu

=== Notes ===
==== Withdrawals ====
- Iceland
- Luxembourg
- Spain

==== Returns ====
- Belgium
- Czechoslovakia
- England
- Greece
- Ireland
- Luxembourg
- Poland
- Scotland
- Yugoslavia

==== Debuts ====
- Malta
