= Larissa Robitschko =

Beauty pageant titleholder (born 1998)

- Born: Styria, Austria
- Beauty pageant titleholder
- Title: Miss Austria 2019
- Major competitions: Miss Styria 2019 (Winner); Miss Austria 2019 (Winner)

Larissa Robitschko is an Austrian model and beauty pageant titleholder who won Miss Austria 2019.

== Pageantry ==
Robitschko won Miss Styria 2019 in April 2019 and was given the right to compete at Miss Austria 2019.

On 6 June 2019, Robitschko competed at the Miss Austria 2019 pageant, where she won. On the next day, It was reported that Austria will still withdraw and not compete in any international pageant like Miss World, Miss Universe and Miss International.

Austria withdrew from the 2018 competition after the franchise was relinquished. The Miss Austria Organization will not compete unless the Miss Austria Organization release official statements regarding on Austria's participation. The Miss Austria Organization has not made any statements regarding on the withdrawal of participation as of 9 October 2026.
