= Mihail Kogălniceanu, Constanța =

Mihail Kogălniceanu
- Commune
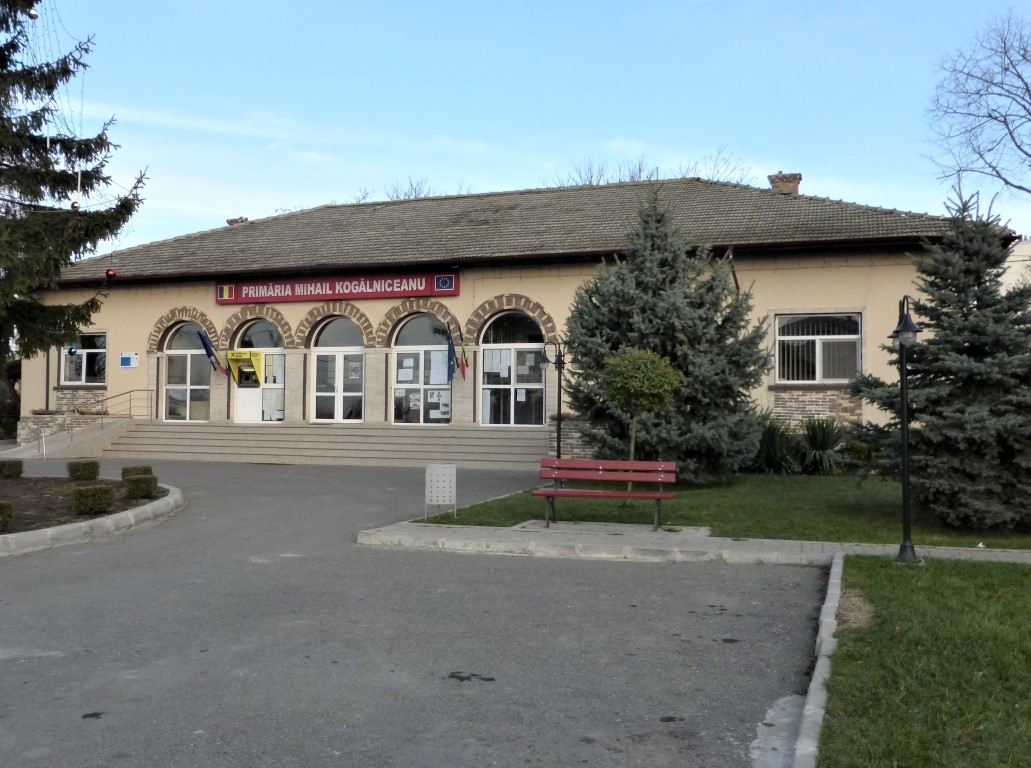
- Town Hall

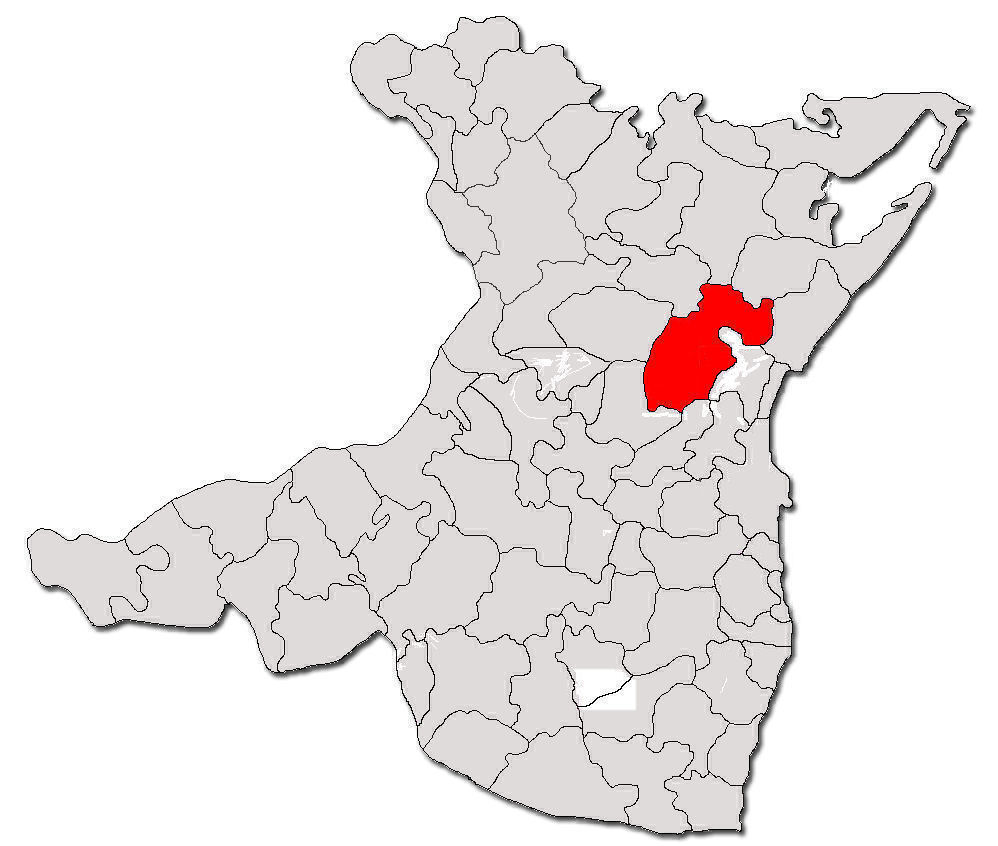
- Location in Constanța County

- Location in Romania
- Coordinates: 44°22′0″N 28°27′30″E
- Country: Romania
- County: Constanța
- Subdivisions: Mihail Kogălniceanu, Palazu Mic, Piatra

Government
  - Mayor (2020–2024): Ancuța-Daniela Belu (PNL)
- Area: 165.51 km^{2} (63.90 sq mi)
- Elevation: 10 m (33 ft)
- Population (2021-12-01): 9,103
  - Density: 55.00/km^{2} (142.4/sq mi)
- Time zone: UTC+02:00 (EET)
  - Summer (DST): UTC+03:00 (EEST)
- Postal code: 907195
- Area code: +(40) 241
- Vehicle reg.: CT
- Website: mk-primaria.ro

Mihail Kogălniceanu (Romanian pronunciation: [mihaˈil koɡəlniˈtʃe̯anu]) is a commune in Constanța County, Northern Dobruja, Romania, located 25 km (16 mi) northwest of Constanța proper. The commune includes three villages:

- Mihail Kogălniceanu - historical names: Kara Murat (Turkish: Karamurat), Bulgari (Bulgarian: Българи) and Regele Ferdinand
- Palazu Mic
- Piatra (historical name: Tașaul, Turkish: Taşağıl)

The commune further includes two territorially distinct communities, Social Group Sibioara and Social Group Ceres, which are legally part of the village of Mihail Kogălniceanu. The Mihail Kogălniceanu International Airport is located nearby.

== History ==
The village is situated on the site of a Roman settlement called Vicus Clementianus, discovered by the archaeologist Vasile Pârvan in 1913.

In 1651, the place was mentioned by the Ottoman traveler Evliya Çelebi as a Tatar settlement named Kara Murat ("Black Murat", after its founder).

In 1879-1880, after the incorporation of Northern Dobruja into Romania, the village started to be settled by Romanian shepherds from Transylvania (Mocani). Germans coming from Bessarabia began settling the village from 1876. By 1918, the Germans made up the majority of the population. In the 1930s, the village was renamed Ferdinand I, after King Ferdinand I of Romania. In 1948, with the advent of the communist regime, the commune was given its current name, after the Romanian politician Mihail Kogălniceanu.

Mihail Kogălniceanu is home to the Gheorghe Celea Museum, the first and only Aromanian museum in Romania, founded in 2006 by Willibard ("Willy") Wisoșenschi of the Mușata Armână Cultural Foundation.

== Demographics ==
At the 2011 census, Mihail Kogălniceanu had a population of 9,978; of those, 8,273 were Romanians (84.95%), 419 Tatars (4.30%), 246 Roma (2.53%), 108 Aromanians (1.11%), 33 Turks (0.34%), 3 Hungarians (0.03%), 3 Germans (0.03%), 642 others (6.59%), and 12 with undeclared ethnicity (0.12%). At the 2021 census, the commune had 9,103 inhabitants, of which 82.73% were Romanians, 2.68% Tatars, and 1.66% Roma.

== Natives ==
- Adolph Bachmeier (1937–2016), U.S.-Romanian soccer player
- Dumitru Caraman (born 1944), footballer
- Toma Enache (born 1970), film director
- Stere Gulea (born 1943), film director and screenwriter
- Adrian Pllotschi (born 1959), rugby union football player and coach
- Stere Sertov (1963–2022), footballer
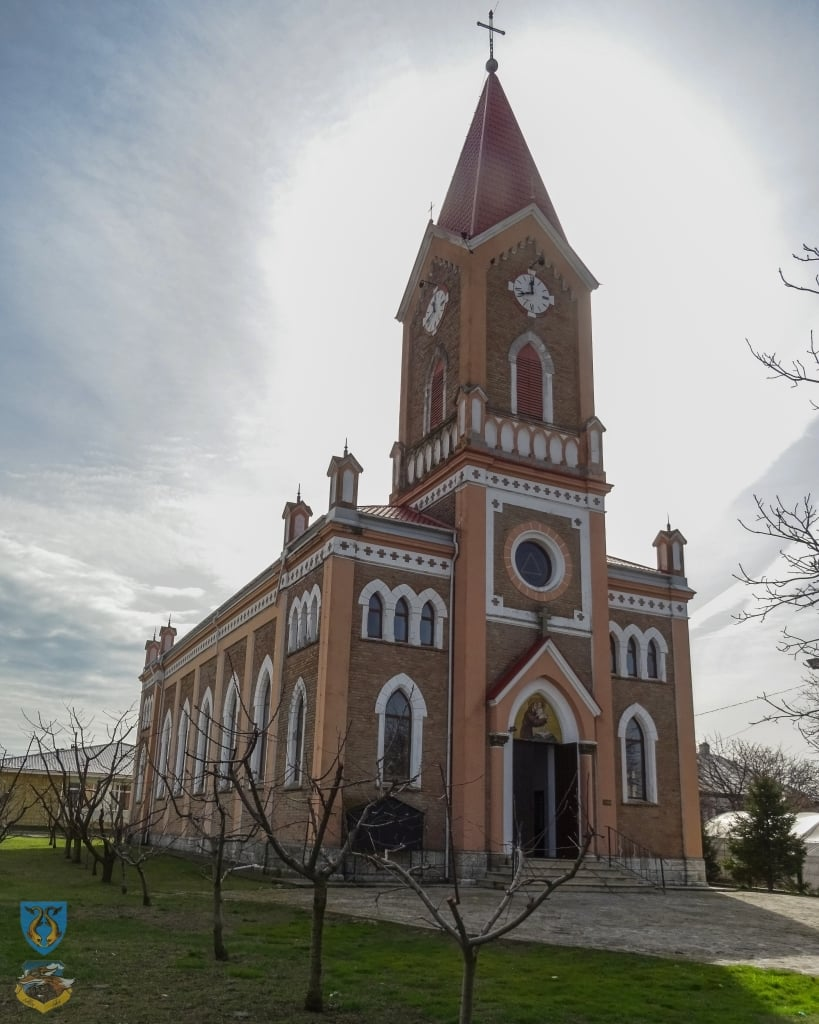
St. Anthony of Padua Catholic church

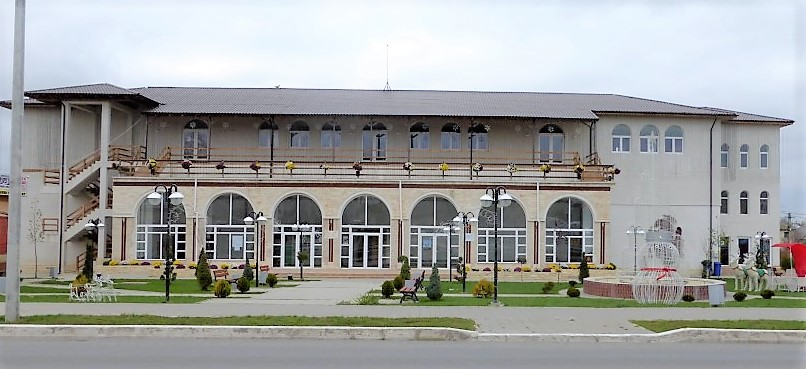
Cultural Center

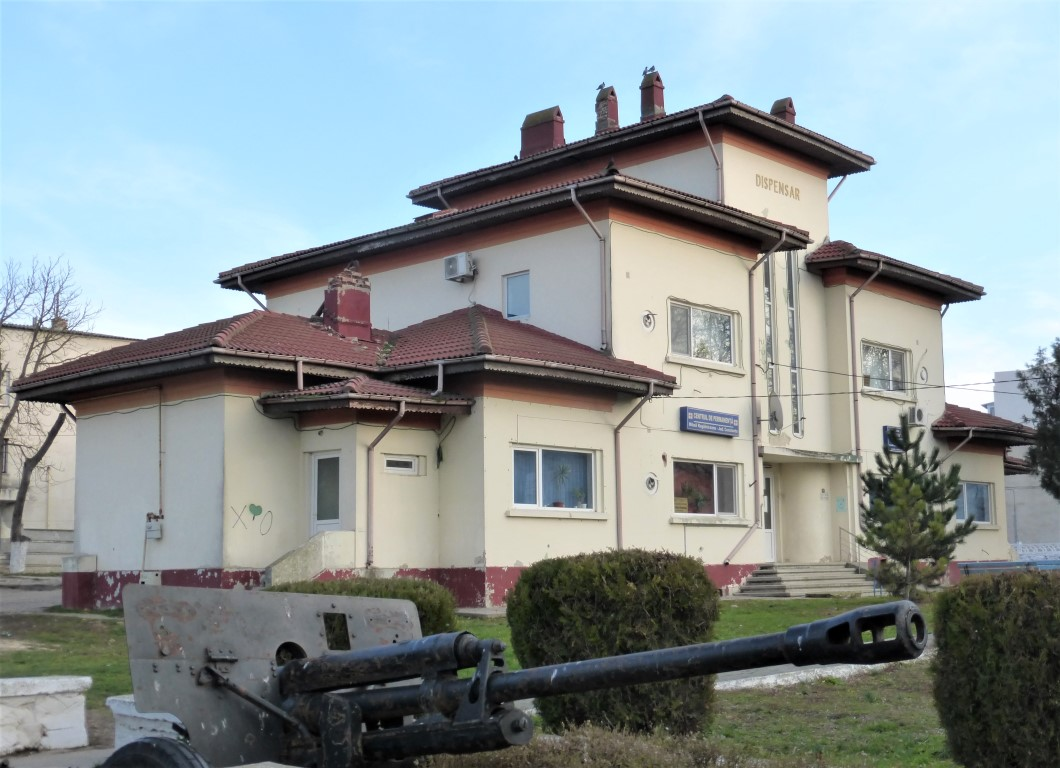
Clinic
