= Miss World 1969 =

19th Miss World pageant

- Eva Rueber-Staier
- Date: 27 November 1969
- Presenters: Michael Aspel; Pete Murray
- Entertainment: Frank Ifield; Lionel Blair
- Venue: Royal Albert Hall, London, United Kingdom
- Broadcaster: BBC
- Entrants: 50
- Placements: 15
- Debuts: Seychelles
- Withdrawals: Ceylon; Ghana; Italy; Kenya; Morocco; Peru; Switzerland; Thailand; Uganda
- Returns: Czechoslovakia; Gambia; Iceland; Lebanon; Paraguay
- Winner: Eva Rueber-Staier; Austria

Miss World 1969 was the 19th edition of the Miss World pageant, held at the Royal Albert Hall in London, United Kingdom on 27 November 1969.

At the end of the event, Penelope Plummer of Australia crowned Eva Rueber-Staier of Austria as Miss World 1969. It was Austria's first-ever victory in the history of the pageant. Gail Renshaw of the United States finished as first runner-up, while Christa Margraf of Germany finished as second runner-up.

Contestants from fifty countries and territories participated in this pageant. Michael Aspel and Pete Murray hosted the pageant. Frank Ifield and Lionel Blair performed at this edition.

== Background ==
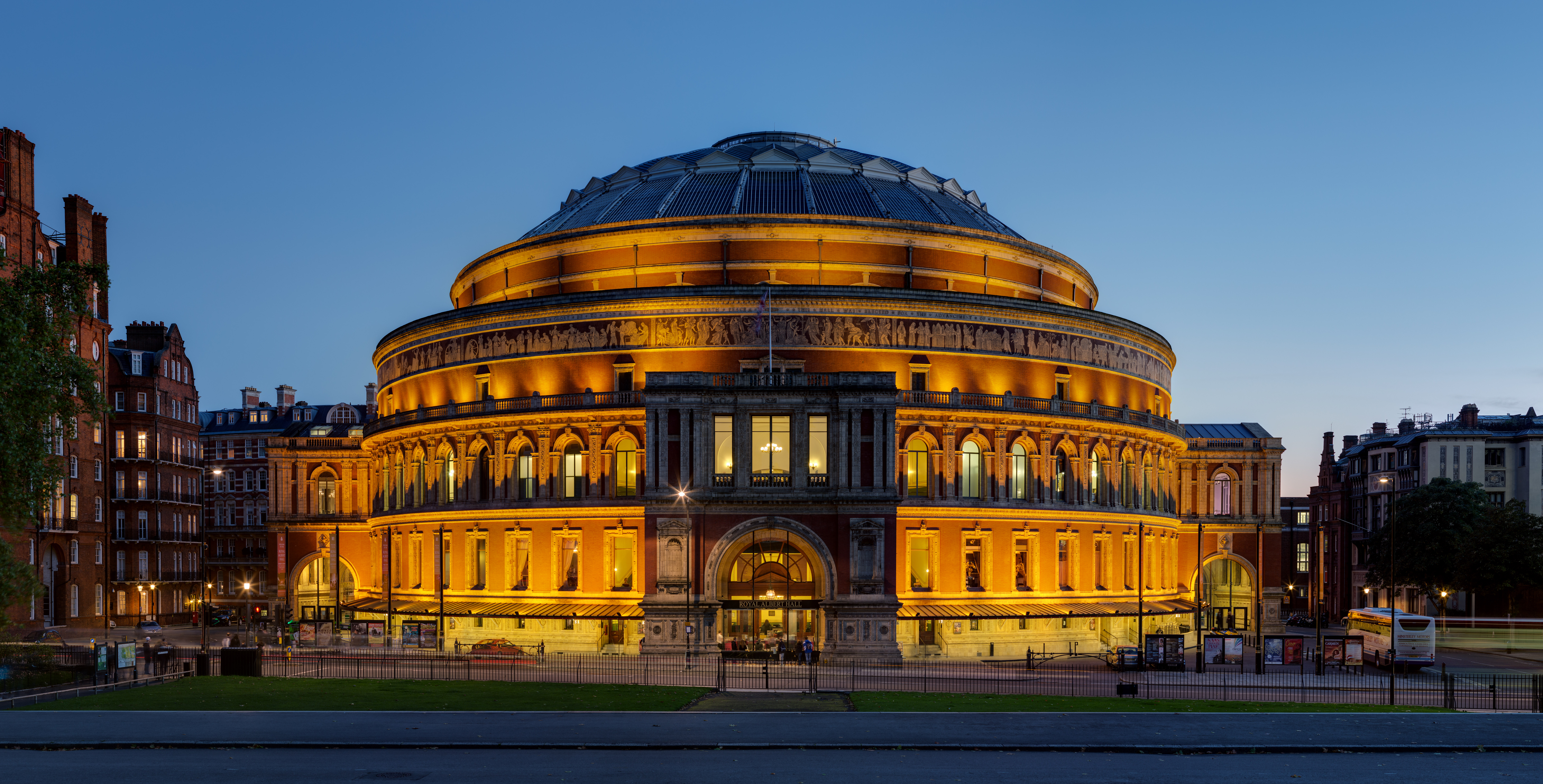
Royal Albert Hall, the location of Miss World 1969

=== Location and date ===
Due to the arrival of colored television in London, Miss World Organization president Eric Morley decided to hold the pageant at the Royal Albert Hall instead of the Lyceum Ballroom to make the pageant larger and to accommodate the use of colored television. The date of the pageant was also moved to 27 November 1969.

On 20 November 1969, two groups of British Young Liberals began protesting against the participation of Miss South Africa Linda Collett, because according to them, Collett was chosen based on her skin color. Mecca Ltd. denied this, stating that they had no intention of removing Collett as a candidate for Miss World.

=== Selection of participants ===
Participants from fifty countries and territories were chosen to compete in the pageant. Five contestants were appointed to represent their countries/territories after placing as runners-up in their national pageants, or were selected through a casting process, and one contestant was appointed after the original delegate withdrew.

==== Replacements ====
After participating in Miss Universe, Miss Venezuela 1969 María José Yellici resigned from her title to marry her boyfriend Guillermo Zuloaga, who later became the president of Globovision two years later. Because of this, the title was given to first runner-up Marzia Piazza. However, Yellici's wedding did not push through.

==== Debuts, returns, and withdrawals ====
The territory of Seychelles competed for the first time. Returning to this edition were Paraguay, which last competed in 1959, and Czechoslovakia, Gambia, Lebanon, and Iceland, which last competed in 1967.

Ceylon, Ghana, Italy, Kenya, Morocco, Peru, Thailand, and Uganda did not compete in this edition. Methsili Silva of Ceylon, Victoria Folson of Ghana, Phanarat Phisutthisak of Thailand, and Charlotte Ssali of Uganda did not compete due to undisclosed reasons. Instead of being sent to Miss World, the sponsors of Rahima Hachti of Morocco decided to send her to Miss Maja International in Spain instead. The Miss Italia Organization did not send Anna Zamboni of Italy because they allegedly felt it was a waste of money to spend on bringing their candidate to the United Kingdom only for her to be used for publicity. Kenya and Peru did not participate after their national organizations failed to hold a national competition or appoint a delegate.

Miss Switzerland 1969 Liselotte Pouli was also scheduled to compete in this edition, but due to the publication of nude photographs of her predecessor, the organizers of their national competition decided not to send Pouli to London.

== Results ==
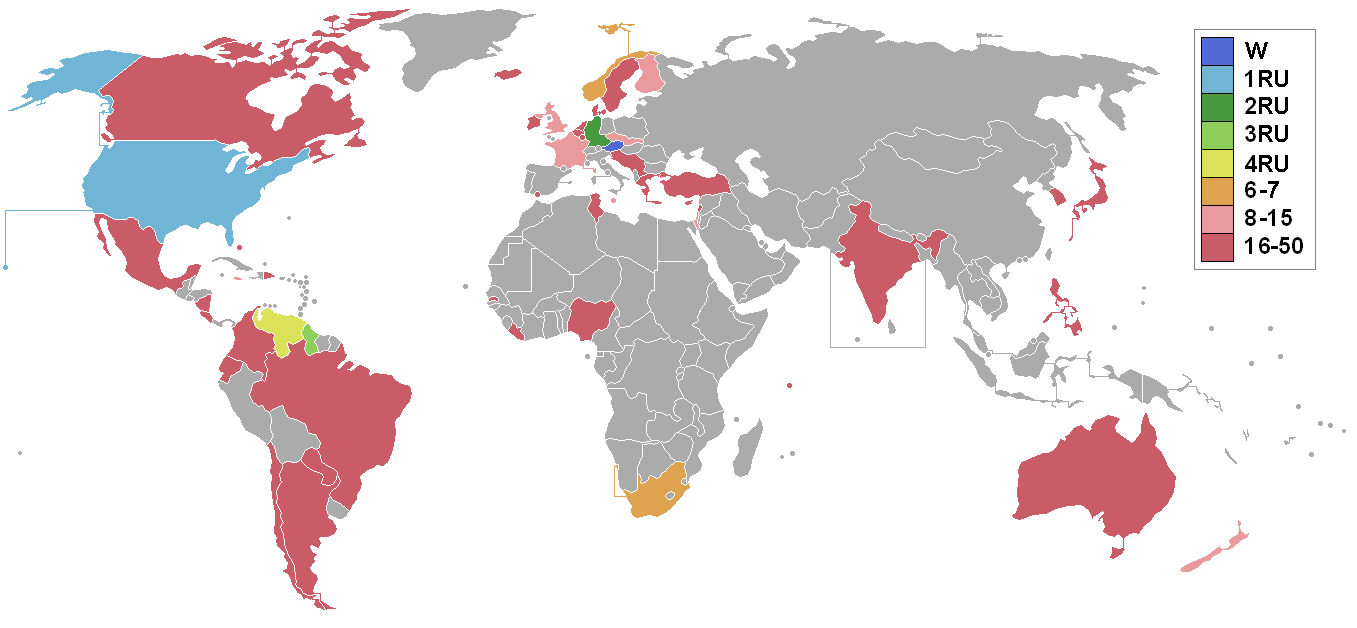
Countries and territories which participated in Miss World 1969 and their placements.

=== Placements ===
Placement	Contestant
Miss World 1969	Austria – Eva Rueber-Staier
1st runner-up	United States – Gail Renshaw
2nd runner-up	Germany – Christa Margraf
3rd runner-up	Guyana – Pamela Lord
4th runner-up	Venezuela – Marzia Piazza
Top 7	Norway – Kjersti Jortun; South Africa – Linda Collett
Top 15	Czechoslovakia – Marcela Bitnarova; Finland – Päivi Raita; France – Suzanne Angly; Israel – Tehila Selah; Jamaica – Marlyn Elizabeth Taylor; Malta – Mary Brincat; New Zealand – Carole Robinson; United Kingdom – Sheena Drummond

== Pageant ==
=== Format ===
As in 1961, fifteen semi-finalists were chosen through a preliminary competition held on the day of the final competition, which consisted of the swimsuit and evening gown competitions. The fifteen semi-finalists competed in the swimsuit and evening gown competitions, and seven finalists were subsequently chosen to compete in the final interview.

=== Selection committee ===
- Francis Chichester – English aviator and pilot
- Henry Cooper – English boxer
- Lady Sarah Courage – Model and wife of English car racer Piers Courage
- Michael Crawford – English actor and comedian
- Peter Dimmock – BBC executive
- Ambrose Patrick Genda – High Commissioner of Sierra Leone to the United Kingdom
- Abdul Jamil Abdul Rais – High Commissioner of Malaysia to the United Kingdom
- Omar Sharif – Egyptian actor
- Susannah York – English actress

== Contestants ==
Fifty contestants competed for the title.

Country/Territory	Contestant	Age (Note: Ages at the time of the pageant)	Hometown
Argentina	Ana María Soria	23	Buenos Aires
Australia	Stefane Meurer	20	Newport
Austria	Eva Rueber-Staier	20	Graz
Bahamas	Ida Pearce	16	Nassau
Belgium	Maud Alin	18	Charleroi
Brazil	Ana Cristina Rodrigues	18	Rio Grande do Sul
Canada	Jacquie Perrin	21	Toronto
Chile	Ana María Nazar	22	Santiago
Colombia	Lina María García	18	Santander
Costa Rica	Damaris Ureña	17	Guanacaste
Cyprus	Flora Diaouri	19	Nicosia
Czechoslovakia	Marcela Bitnarova	19	Náchod
Denmark	Jeanne Perfeldt	21	Copenhagen
Dominican Republic	Sandra Cabrera	18	Peravia
Ecuador	Ximena Aulestia	17	Quito
Finland	Päivi Raita	19	Helsinki
France	Suzanne Angly	18	Mulhouse
(The Gambia) Gambia	Marie Carayol	24	Banjul
Germany	Christa Margraf	22	Eibach
Gibraltar	Marilou Chiappe	21	Gibraltar
Greece	Heleni Alexopoulou	18	Athens
Guyana	Pamela Lord	24	Georgetown
Iceland	Ragnheiður Pétursdóttir	17	Reykjavík
India	Adina Shellim	21	Maharashtra
(Republic of Ireland) Ireland	Hilary Clarke	19	Dublin
Israel	Tehila Selah	21	Ramat HaSharon
Jamaica	Marlyn Elizabeth Taylor	21	Kingston
Japan	Emiko Karashima	20	Kitakyushu
Lebanon	Roula Majzoub	17	Beirut
Liberia	Antoinette Coleman	19	Clay-Ashland
Luxembourg	Jacqueline Schaeffer	18	Esch-sur-Alzette
Malta	Mary Brincat	17	Gżira
Mexico	Gloria Leticia Hernández	–	Guanajuato
Netherlands	Nente van der Vliet	23	The Hague
New Zealand	Carole Robinson	22	Auckland
Nicaragua	Carlota Marina Brenes López	19	Matagalpa
Nigeria	Morenike Faribido	23	Lagos
Norway	Kjersti Jortun	19	Oslo
Paraguay	Blanca Zaldívar	–	Asunción
Philippines	Feliza Teresa Miro	17	Manila
Seychelles	Sylvia Labonté	18	Victoria
South Africa	Linda Collett	18	Durban
South Korea	Kim Seung-hee	19	Seoul
Sweden	Ing-Marie Ahlin	20	Stockholm
Tunisia	Zohra Tabania	17	Tunis
Turkey	Sermin Aysin	17	Istanbul
United Kingdom	Sheena Drummond	18	Edinburgh
United States	Gail Renshaw	22	Falls Church
Venezuela	Marzia Piazza	18	Vargas
Yugoslavia	Radmila Živković	20	Belgrade
