= Boris Nemšić =

Bosnian-Austrian businessman

- Born: 17 August 1957 (age 68); Sarajevo, Bosnia and Herzegovina, Yugoslavia
- Citizenship: Austrian
- Education: University of Sarajevo (Dipl.-Ing.); TU Wien (Dr. techn.)
- Occupation: Businessman
- Known for: CEO of Telekom Austria; CEO of VimpelCom

Boris Nemšić (born on August 17, 1957, in Sarajevo, Bosnia and Herzegovina) is a Bosnian-Austrian businessman and the former CEO of Telekom Austria. From April 2009 until June 2010 he was CEO of VimpelCom.

== Career ==
In 1980, Nemšić graduated from the University of Sarajevo with a degree in electrical engineering. In 1984, at the age of 27, Nemšić moved to Vienna. In 1990, he received his doctorate from TU Wien, where he worked at the Institute of Telecommunications as a research assistant for two years.

From 1990 until 1997, Nemšić led the department for development of mobile communication at Ascom and Bosch Telecom. In 1997, he was hired by Mobilkom Austria as Head of Network Planning. In 1998, he was appointed to lead the Croatian Mobilkom Austria subsidiary Vipnet.

In May 2000, Mobilkom Austria appointed Nemšić as General Manager of the company. In July 2002, he was additionally appointed COO and in 2006 CEO of Telekom Austria. On March 31, 2009, Nemšić resigned as CEO of Telekom Austria and Mobilkom Austria and was appointed CEO of VimpelCom in Russia. In June 2010, he left the company unexpectedly. In 2011, Nemšić joined Delta Partners, a consulting firm specializing in telecommunications, media and technologies.

Nemšić was questioned as a witness in corruption investigations involving Telekom in 2012 and again in 2015.

In 2019, he was named chairman of Infobip.

Nemšić is an investor and consultant for the mobile virtual operator Educom. He held various board member positions at the following companies: I-New Unified Mobile Solutions (chairman of the board), Cellwize (chairman of the board) or Frequentis AG (member of the supervisory board).

He is a member of the University Council of TU Wien. He was named president of the Handball Liga Austria in 2014.

== Personal life ==
Nemšić is married and has two children.

He is of Bosnian Croatian descent.

During his studies, Nemšić played handball and won the Austrian Cup and Austrian championship with UHC Stockerau.

== Honors ==
Nemšić was named "Man of the Year 2007" by Austrian business magazine Trend.

In 2008, he was awarded the Grand Decoration of Honour in Gold for Services to the Republic of Austria for his services to the development of mobile communications in Austria.
