= Lisl Goldarbeiter =

Austrian model and actress (1909–1997)

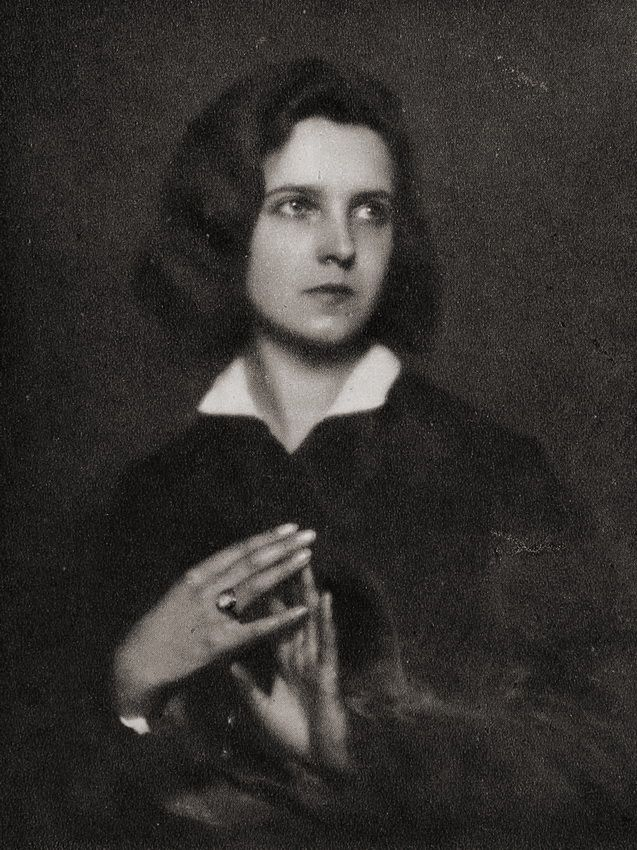
- Goldarbeiter in 1929
- Born: 23 March 1909; Vienna, Austria-Hungary
- Died: 14 December 1997 (aged 88); Budapest, Hungary
- Occupations: Model, Actress
- Spouse: Fritz Spielmann (m. 1930; div. 1937) Marci Tenczer (m. 1949)

Lisl Goldarbeiter (23 March 1909 – 14 December 1997) was an Austrian model and actress, who in 1929, became the first and only Austrian to win the Miss Universe (Note: The International Pageant of Pulchritude, also known as Miss Universe or the International Beauty Contest, was a beauty contest that began in 1920, featuring contestants from multiple nations. This pageant originated the title "Miss Universe" and was the first international contest. The last pageant event in the United States was held in 1931 although additional Miss Universe events were held until 1935. This contest served as a model for modern contests that began after World War II.) title. She also participated in the Miss Europe competition in 1929.

== Life ==
Goldarbeiter was born on 23 March 1909, in Vienna, Austria. She was born in a middle-class Austro-Hungarian Jewish family. She was the daughter of Izidor Goldarbeiter (b.1877), a fashion dealer from Szeged, Hungary, and, Aloisia née Schimek (1884–1967).

On 11 June 1929, Goldarbeiter became the first-ever non-American to win the Miss Universe beauty pageant, which was held in Galveston, Texas. Lisl was voted Miss Universe 1929 in a unanimous decision by the jurors. Miss United States took the second place and the third, fourth and fifth places were also taken by Americans representing Ohio, Dallas and Massachusetts. Of the 34 contestants, 27 were from America.

In the same year of 1929, she finished second at the Miss Europe beauty contest in Paris. In the summer of 1930 Goldarbeiter married Fritz Spielmann, who came from a Viennese industrialist family and whom she had met in Paris. They divorced in 1937. During WWII, because her mother was Protestant, she did not suffer Nazi persecution. She married her second cousin Marczell "Marci" Tenczer in 1949. Marci and Goldarbeiter grew up together in Vienna, and he continued to live in Goldarbeiter's house after she married Spielmann. Marci was an amateur filmmaker. Goldarbeiter's modeling talent was discovered by Marci during the early 1920s. He used to take photographs of her when he moved to Vienna from Szeged in the late 1920s.

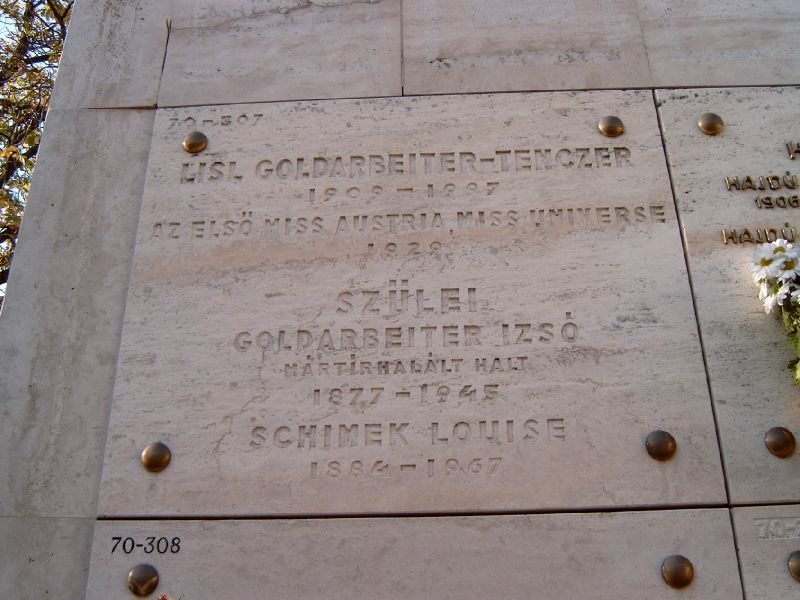
Tomb of Lisl Goldarbeiter

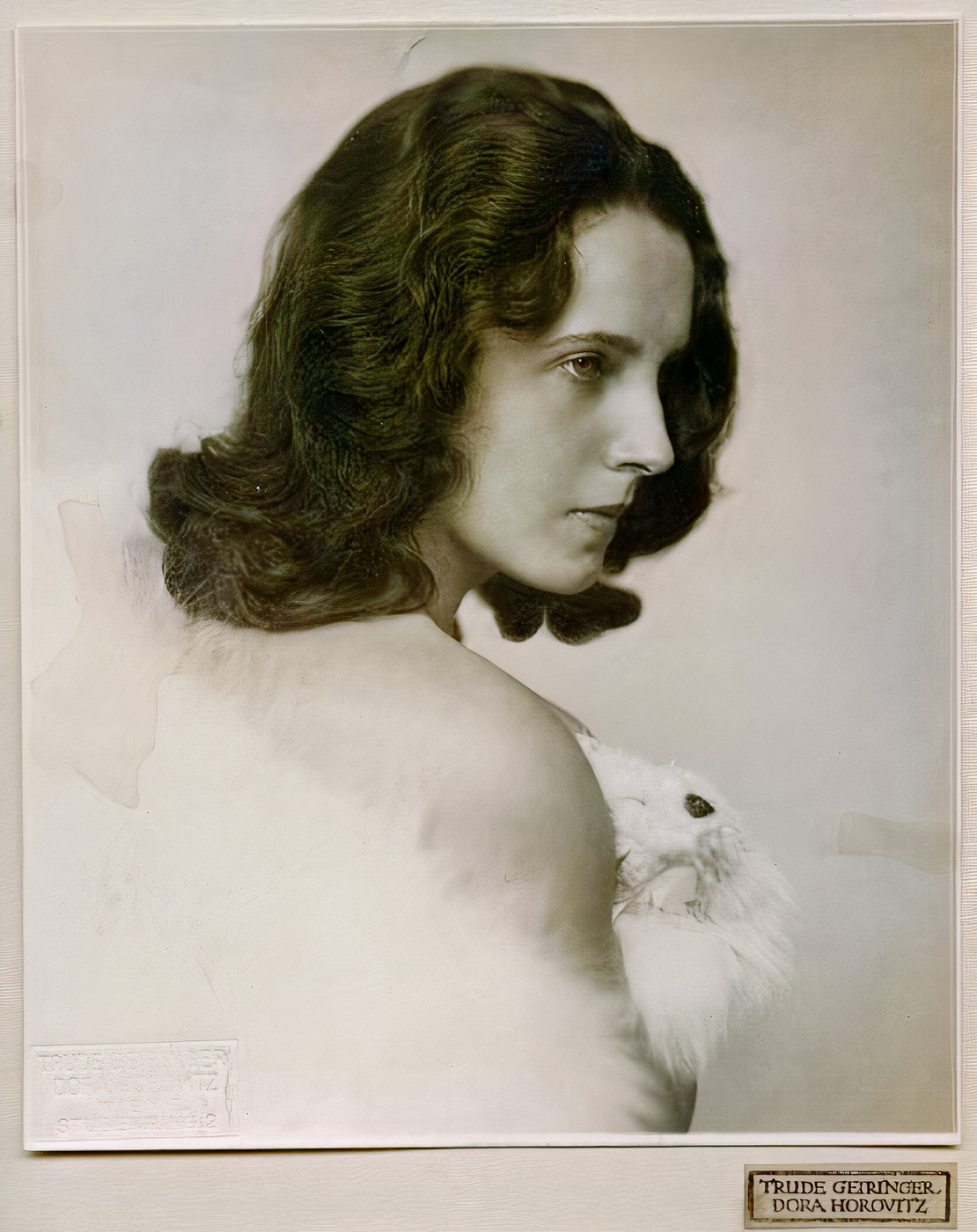
Lisl Goldarbeiter's photograph during the 1929 Miss Universe contest

Lisl Goldarbeiter died on 14 December 1997 in Budapest, Hungary. She is buried in the Farkasréti Cemetery.

== In popular culture ==
=== Films ===
- Miss Universe 1929 – Lisl Goldarbeiter. A Queen in Wien (2006, Documentary).

=== Literature ===
- Reuveni, Gideon; Roemer, Nils H. (2010). Longing, belonging, and the making of Jewish consumer culture. Leiden: Brill. ISBN 978-90-04-18607-1. OCLC 704665456.
- Greenspoon, Leonard J. (2013). Fashioning Jews : clothing, culture, and commerce. West Lafayette, Ind. ISBN 978-1-61249-292-6. OCLC 870303200.
