= Ena Kadic =

Bosnian-Austrian model (1989–2015)

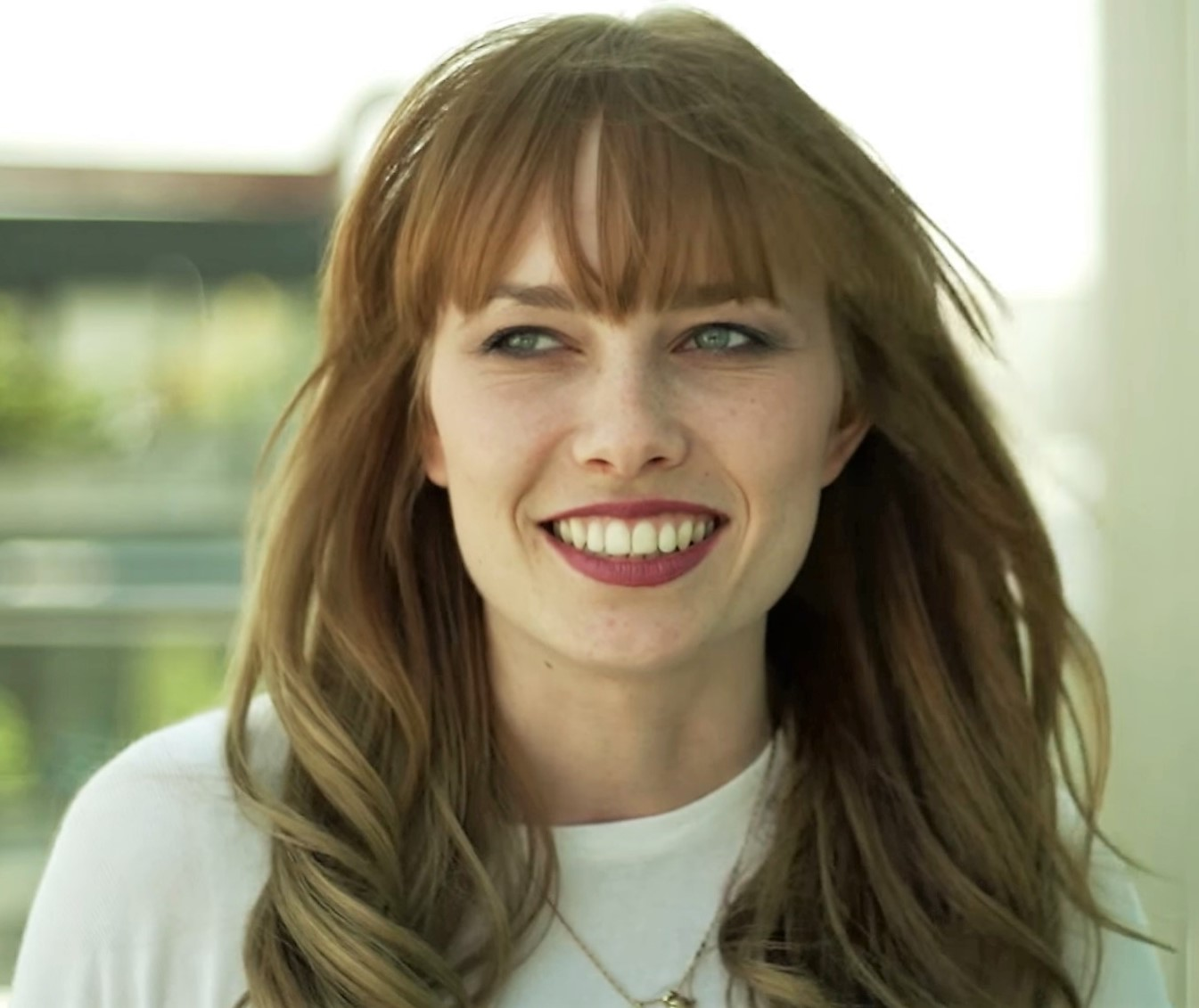
- Kadic in 2014
- Born: Ena Kadić; 6 October 1989; Bihać, FR Yugoslavia
- Died: 19 October 2015 (aged 26); Innsbruck, Tyrol, Austria
- Height: 1.77 m (5 ft 10 in)
- Beauty pageant titleholder
- Title: Miss Austria 2013
- Hair color: Brown
- Eye color: Blue/green

Ena Kadić (6 October 1989 – 19 October 2015) was a Bosnian-Austrian model and beauty pageant titleholder who was the winner of the Miss Austria 2013.

== Pageantry ==
Kadic represented Austria at the Miss World 2013 pageant in Bali, Indonesia on 28 September 2013.

== Death ==
Kadić died on 19 October 2015 after sustaining serious head injuries, a lung trauma and pelvic injuries after falling from the Bergisel mountain in Innsbruck, Tyrol while jogging. Investigators now believe that it was a suicide.
