= List of Miss World titleholders =

List of Miss World winners (1951–present)

The following is a list of Miss World titleholders from the competition's inaugural edition in 1951 to present.

== Miss World titleholders ==
Edition	Year	Representing	Miss World	Age (Note: Ages at the time of the pageant.)	Hometown	National Title	Location	Date	Entrants
1st	1951	Sweden	Kiki Håkansson	22	Stockholm	The Prettiest Girl in Sweden 1951	London, United Kingdom	July 29, 1951	27
2nd	1952	Sweden	May-Louise Flodin	18	Stockholm	The Prettiest Girl in Sweden 1952	London, United Kingdom	November 14, 1952	11
3rd	1953	France	Denise Perrier	18	Ambérieu-en-Bugey	Élégance Française 1953 (Note: Denise Perrier had won Miss France 1953 under a separate Miss France pageant organized by a separate competing committee (French Committee of Elegance) rather than the main one (Miss France Committee/Comité Miss France), and was later designated by the competing committee as Miss World France 1953 when that committee obtained the franchise license rights for France at Miss World.)	London, United Kingdom	October 19, 1953	15
4th	1954	Egypt	Antigone Costanda	19	Alexandria	Miss Egypt 1953	London, United Kingdom	October 18, 1954	16
5th	1955	Venezuela	Susana Duijm	19	Aragua de Barcelona	Miss Venezuela 1955	London, United Kingdom	October 20, 1955	21
6th	1956	Germany	Petra Schürmann	23	Mönchengladbach	Miss Germany World 1956	London, United Kingdom	October 15, 1956	24
7th	1957	Finland	Marita Lindahl	18	Helsinki	Miss Suomi 1957	London, United Kingdom	October 14, 1957	23
8th	1958	South Africa	Penelope Coelen	18	Durban	Miss South Africa 1958	London, United Kingdom	October 13, 1958	20
9th	1959	Netherlands	Corine Rottschäfer	21	Hoorn	Miss Holland 1957	London, United Kingdom	November 10, 1959	37
10th	1960	Argentina	Norma Cappagli	21	Buenos Aires	Miss Sweater Argentina 1960	London, United Kingdom	November 8, 1960	39
11th	1961	United Kingdom	Rosemarie Frankland	18	Rhosllanerchrugog	Miss United Kingdom 1961	London, United Kingdom	November 9, 1961	37
12th	1962	Netherlands	Catharina Lodders	20	Haarlem	Miss Holland 1962	London, United Kingdom	November 8, 1962	33
13th	1963	Jamaica	Carole Crawford	20	Kingston	Miss Jamaica World 1963	London, United Kingdom	November 7, 1963	40
14th	1964	United Kingdom	Ann Sidney	20	Poole	Miss United Kingdom 1964	London, United Kingdom	November 12, 1964	42
15th	1965	United Kingdom	Lesley Langley	21	Weymouth	Miss United Kingdom 1965	London, United Kingdom	November 19, 1965	48
16th	1966	India	Reita Faria	23	Mumbai	Eve's Weekly Miss India 1966	London, United Kingdom	November 17, 1966	51
17th	1967	Peru	Madeleine Hartog-Bel	21	Camaná	Miss Perú 1966	London, United Kingdom	November 16, 1967	55
18th	1968	Australia	Penelope Plummer	19	Kempsey	Dream Girl Miss Australia 1968	London, United Kingdom	November 14, 1968	53
19th	1969	Austria	Eva Rueber-Staier	20	Bruck an der Mur	Miss Austria 1969	London, United Kingdom	November 27, 1969	50
20th	1970	Grenada	Jennifer Hosten	23	St. George's	Miss Grenada 1970	London, United Kingdom	November 20, 1970	58
21st	1971	Brazil	Lúcia Petterle	22	Rio de Janeiro	Miss Brasil Mundo 1971	London, United Kingdom	November 10, 1971	56
22nd	1972	Australia	Belinda Green	20	Sydney	Dream Girl Miss Australia 1972	London, United Kingdom	December 1, 1972	53
23rd	1973	United States	Marjorie Wallace (Note: Became the first titleholder not to complete her reign after being fired for failing to fulfill the basic requirements of the job. Organisers extended an offer to first runner-up Evangeline Pascual of the Philippines to complete the duties of Miss World for the remainder of the year without holding the title; when Pascual turned down that offer, organisers next turned to second runner-up Patsy Yuen of Jamaica, who accepted.)	19	Indianapolis	Miss World USA 1973	London, United Kingdom	November 23, 1973	54
24th	1974	United Kingdom	Helen Morgan (Note: Resigned four days after winning the title amid intense pressure over her status as a single mother.)	22	Walsall	Miss United Kingdom 1974	London, United Kingdom	November 22, 1974	58
24th	1974	South Africa	Anneline Kriel (Note: Assumed the title following Helen Morgan's resignation.)	19	Pretoria	Miss South Africa 1974	London, United Kingdom	November 22, 1974	58
25th	1975	Puerto Rico	Wilnelia Merced	18	Caguas	Miss Mundo de Puerto Rico 1975	London, United Kingdom	November 20, 1975	67
26th	1976	Jamaica	Cindy Breakspeare	22	Kingston	Miss Jamaica World 1976	London, United Kingdom	November 18, 1976	60
27th	1977	Sweden	Mary Stävin	20	Örebro County	Miss Sweden World 1977	London, United Kingdom	November 17, 1977	62
28th	1978	Argentina	Silvana Suárez	20	Córdoba	Miss Argentina Mundo 1978	London, United Kingdom	November 16, 1978	68
29th	1979	Bermuda	Gina Swainson	21	Hamilton	Miss Bermuda 1979	London, United Kingdom	November 15, 1979	70
30th	1980	Germany	Gabriella Brum (Note: Resigned 18 hours after winning the title, reportedly due to her partner's disapproval. Allegations that she had posed for nude photographs were later cited as a possible contributing factor.)	18	Berlin	Miss Germany 1980	London, United Kingdom	November 13, 1980	67
30th	1980	Guam	Kimberley Santos (Note: Assumed the title following Gabriella Brum's resignation.)	19	Hagåtña	Miss Guam 1980	London, United Kingdom	November 13, 1980	67
31st	1981	Venezuela	Pilín León	18	Maracay	Miss Venezuela Mundo 1981	London, United Kingdom	November 12, 1981	67
32nd	1982	Dominican Republic	Mariasela Álvarez	22	Santo Domingo	Miss República Dominicana Mundo 1982	London, United Kingdom	November 18, 1982	68
33rd	1983	United Kingdom	Sarah-Jane Hutt	19	Poole	Miss United Kingdom 1983	London, United Kingdom	November 17, 1983	72
34th	1984	Venezuela	Astrid Carolina Herrera	21	San Felipe	Miss Venezuela Mundo 1984	London, United Kingdom	November 15, 1984	72
35th	1985	Iceland	Hólmfríður Karlsdóttir	22	Reykjavík	Ungfrú Ísland Heimur 1985	London, United Kingdom	November 14, 1985	78
36th	1986	Trinidad and Tobago	Giselle Laronde	23	Port of Spain	Miss Trinidad and Tobago 1986	London, United Kingdom	November 13, 1986	77
37th	1987	Austria	Ulla Weigerstorfer	20	Bad Aussee	Miss Austria World 1987	London, United Kingdom	November 12, 1987	78
38th	1988	Iceland	Linda Pétursdóttir	19	Húsavík	Ungfrú Ísland 1988	London, United Kingdom	November 17, 1988	84
39th	1989	Poland	Aneta Kręglicka	24	Szczecin	Miss Polonia 1989	Wan Chai, Hong Kong	November 22, 1989	78
40th	1990	United States	Gina Tolleson	21	Spartanburg	Miss USA World 1990	London, United Kingdom	November 8, 1990	81
41st	1991	Venezuela	Ninibeth Leal	20	Maracaibo	Miss Venezuela Mundo 1991	Atlanta, United States	December 28, 1991	78
42nd	1992	Russia	Julia Kourotchkina	18	Shcherbinka	Miss Russia 1992	Sun City, South Africa	December 12, 1992	83
43rd	1993	Jamaica	Lisa Hanna	18	Kingston	Miss Jamaica World 1993	Sun City, South Africa	November 27, 1993	81
44th	1994	India	Aishwarya Rai	21	Mangaluru	Femina Miss India World 1994	Sun City, South Africa	November 19, 1994	87
45th	1995	Venezuela	Jacqueline Aguilera	19	Valencia	Miss Venezuela Mundo 1995	Sun City, South Africa	November 18, 1995	84
46th	1996	Greece	Irene Skliva	18	Athens	Miss Hellas 1996	Bengaluru, India	November 23, 1996	88
47th	1997	India	Diana Hayden	24	Hyderabad	Femina Miss India World 1997	Mahé, Seychelles	November 22, 1997	86
48th	1998	Israel	Linor Abargil	18	Netanya	Miss Israel 1998	Mahé, Seychelles	November 26, 1998	86
49th	1999	India	Yukta Mookhey	21	Mulund	Femina Miss India World 1999	London, United Kingdom	December 4, 1999	94
50th	2000	India	Priyanka Chopra	18	Jamshedpur	Femina Miss India World 2000	London, United Kingdom	November 30, 2000	95
51st	2001	Nigeria	Agbani Darego	19	Lagos	Most Beautiful Girl in Nigeria 2001	Sun City, South Africa	November 16, 2001	93
52nd	2002	Turkey	Azra Akın	21	Ankara	Türkiye Güzeli 2002	London, United Kingdom (Note: Originally set to be held in Abuja, Nigeria, but was relocated to the United Kingdom after anti-pageant rioting.)	December 7, 2002	88
53rd	2003	Ireland	Rosanna Davison	19	Dublin	Miss Ireland 2003	Sanya, China	December 6, 2003	106
54th	2004	Peru	María Julia Mantilla	20	Trujillo	Miss Perú Mundo 2004	Sanya, China	December 4, 2004	107
55th	2005	Iceland	Unnur Vilhjálmsdóttir	21	Reykjavík	Ungfrú Ísland 2005	Sanya, China	December 10, 2005	102
56th	2006	Czech Republic	Taťána Kuchařová	18	Opočno	Miss České Republiky 2006	Warsaw, Poland	September 30, 2006	104
57th	2007	China	Zhang Zilin	23	Weihai	Miss China World 2007	Sanya, China	December 1, 2007	106
58th	2008	Russia	Ksenia Sukhinova	21	Tyumen	Miss Russia 2007	Johannesburg, South Africa (Note: Originally set to be held in Kyiv, Ukraine, but was relocated to South Africa after a diplomatic crisis between Russia and Georgia.)	December 13, 2008	109
59th	2009	Gibraltar	Kaiane Aldorino	23	Gibraltar	Miss Gibraltar 2009	Johannesburg, South Africa	December 12, 2009	112
60th	2010	United States	Alexandria Mills	18	Louisville	Miss United States World 2010	Sanya, China	October 30, 2010	115
61st	2011	Venezuela	Ivian Sarcos	22	Guanare	Miss Venezuela Mundo 2010	London, United Kingdom	November 6, 2011	113
62nd	2012	China	Yu Wenxia	23	Shangzhi	Miss China World 2012	Ordos City, China	August 18, 2012	116
63rd	2013	Philippines	Megan Young	23	Olongapo	Miss World Philippines 2013	Nusa Dua, Indonesia	September 28, 2013	127
64th	2014	South Africa	Rolene Strauss	22	Volksrust	Miss South Africa 2014	London, United Kingdom	December 14, 2014	121
65th	2015	Spain	Mireia Lalaguna	23	Barcelona	Miss Mundo España 2015	Sanya, China	December 19, 2015	114
66th	2016	Puerto Rico	Stephanie Del Valle	19	San Juan	Miss Mundo de Puerto Rico 2016	Oxon Hill, United States	December 18, 2016	117
67th	2017	India	Manushi Chhillar	20	Rohtak	Femina Miss India 2017	Sanya, China	November 18, 2017	118
68th	2018	Mexico	Vanessa Ponce	26	Mexico City	Miss México 2018	Sanya, China	December 8, 2018	118
69th	2019	Jamaica	Toni-Ann Singh	23	Saint Thomas	Miss Jamaica World 2019	London, United Kingdom	December 14, 2019	111
2020		No competition held due to the COVID-19 pandemic							
70th	2021	Poland	Karolina Bielawska	22	Łódź	Miss Polonia 2019	San Juan, Puerto Rico	March 16, 2022	97
2022		No competition held due to the delay of the 2021 pageant							
71st	2023	Czech Republic	Krystyna Pyszková	25	Třinec	Miss Czech Republic 2022	Mumbai, India	March 9, 2024	112
2024		No competition held due to the delay of the 2023 pageant							
72nd	2025	Thailand	Suchata Chuangsri	21	Phuket	Miss World Thailand 2025	Hyderabad, India	May 31, 2025	108
73rd	2026	Dominican Republic	Joheirry Mola	24	Santo Domingo	Miss Mundo Dominicana 2026	Nha Trang, Vietnam	September 5, 2026	111

== Countries or territories by number of wins ==
Country or territory	Titles	Years
India	6	1966, 1994, 1997, 1999, 2000, 2017
Venezuela	6	1955, 1981, 1984, 1991, 1995, 2011
Jamaica	4	1963, 1976, 1993, 2019
United Kingdom	4	1961, 1964, 1965, 1983
South Africa	3	1958, 1974, 2014
United States	3	1973, 1990, 2010
Iceland	3	1985, 1988, 2005
Sweden	3	1951, 1952, 1977
Dominican Republic	2	1982, 2026
Czech Republic	2	2006, 2023
Poland	2	1989, 2021
Puerto Rico	2	1975, 2016
China	2	2007, 2012
Russia	2	1992, 2008
Peru	2	1967, 2004
Austria	2	1969, 1987
Argentina	2	1960, 1978
Australia	2	1968, 1972
Netherlands	2	1959, 1962
Thailand	1	2025
Mexico	1	2018
Spain	1	2015
Philippines	1	2013
Gibraltar	1	2009
Ireland	1	2003
Turkey	1	2002
Nigeria	1	2001
Israel	1	1998
Greece	1	1996
Trinidad and Tobago	1	1986
Guam	1	1980
Bermuda	1	1979
Brazil	1	1971
Grenada	1	1970
Finland	1	1957
Germany	1	1956
Egypt	1	1954
France	1	1953

Assumed wins

Titles assumed following resignations.

Country or territory	Titles	Years
Guam	1	1980
South Africa	1	1974

Continent or region	Titles	Years
Oceania	1	1980
Africa	1	1974

Resigned wins

Country or territory	Titles	Years
Germany	1	1980
United Kingdom	1	1974

Continent or region	Titles	Years
Europe	2	1974, 1980

Dethroned not replaced wins

Country or territory	Titles	Year(s)
United States	1	1973

Continent or region	Titles	Years
North America	1	1973

Debut wins

	Countries/Territories/States
1950s	List: 1951: Sweden; 1953: France; 1954: Egypt; 1955: Venezuela; 1956: Germany; 1957: Finland; 1958: South Africa; 1959: Netherlands
1960s	List: 1960: Argentina; 1961: United Kingdom; 1963: Jamaica; 1966: India; 1967: Peru; 1968: Australia; 1969: Austria
1970s	List: 1970: Grenada; 1971: Brazil; 1973: United States; 1975: Puerto Rico; 1979: Bermuda
1980s	List: 1980: Guam; 1982: Dominican Republic; 1985: Iceland; 1986: Trinidad and Tobago; 1989: Poland
1990s	List: 1992: Russia; 1996: Greece; 1998: Israel
2000s	List: 2001: Nigeria; 2002: Turkey; 2003: (Republic of Ireland) Ireland; 2006: Czech Republic; 2007: China; 2009: Gibraltar
2010s	List: 2013: Philippines; 2015: Spain; 2018: Mexico
2020s	List: 2025: Thailand

== Continents by number of wins ==
Continent or region	Titles	Years
Europe	27	1951, 1952, 1953, 1956, 1957, 1959, 1961, 1962, 1964, 1965, 1969, 1977, 1983, 1985, 1987, 1988, 1989, 1992, 1996, 2003, 2005, 2006, 2008, 2009, 2015, 2021, 2023
North America	15	1963, 1970, 1973, 1975, 1976, 1979, 1982, 1986, 1990, 1993, 2010, 2016, 2018, 2019, 2026
Asia	12	1966, 1994, 1997, 1998, 1999, 2000, 2002, 2007, 2012, 2013, 2017, 2025
South America	11	1955, 1960, 1967, 1971, 1978, 1981, 1984, 1991, 1995, 2004, 2011
Africa	5	1954, 1958, 1974, 2001, 2014
Oceania	3	1968, 1972, 1980

== Titleholders gallery ==
Miss World 2026
Joheirry Mola
Dominican Republic

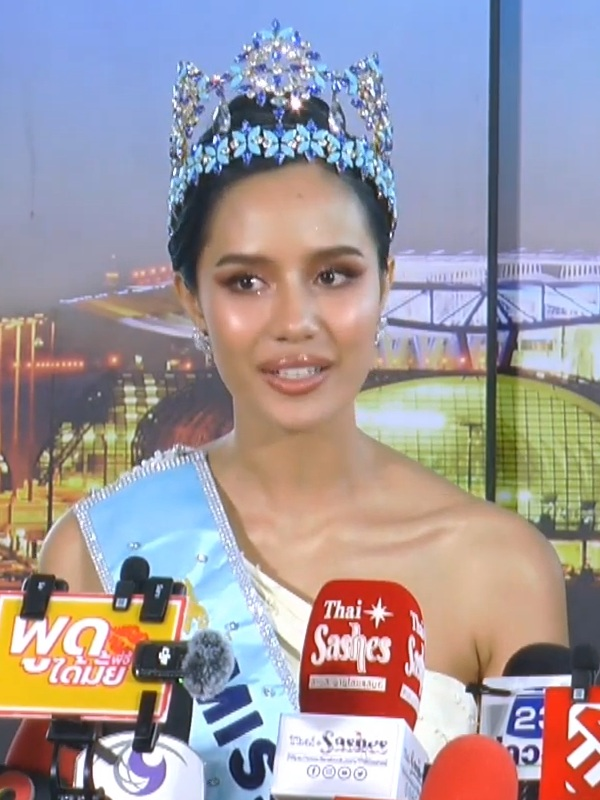
Miss World 2025
Suchata Chuangsri
Thailand

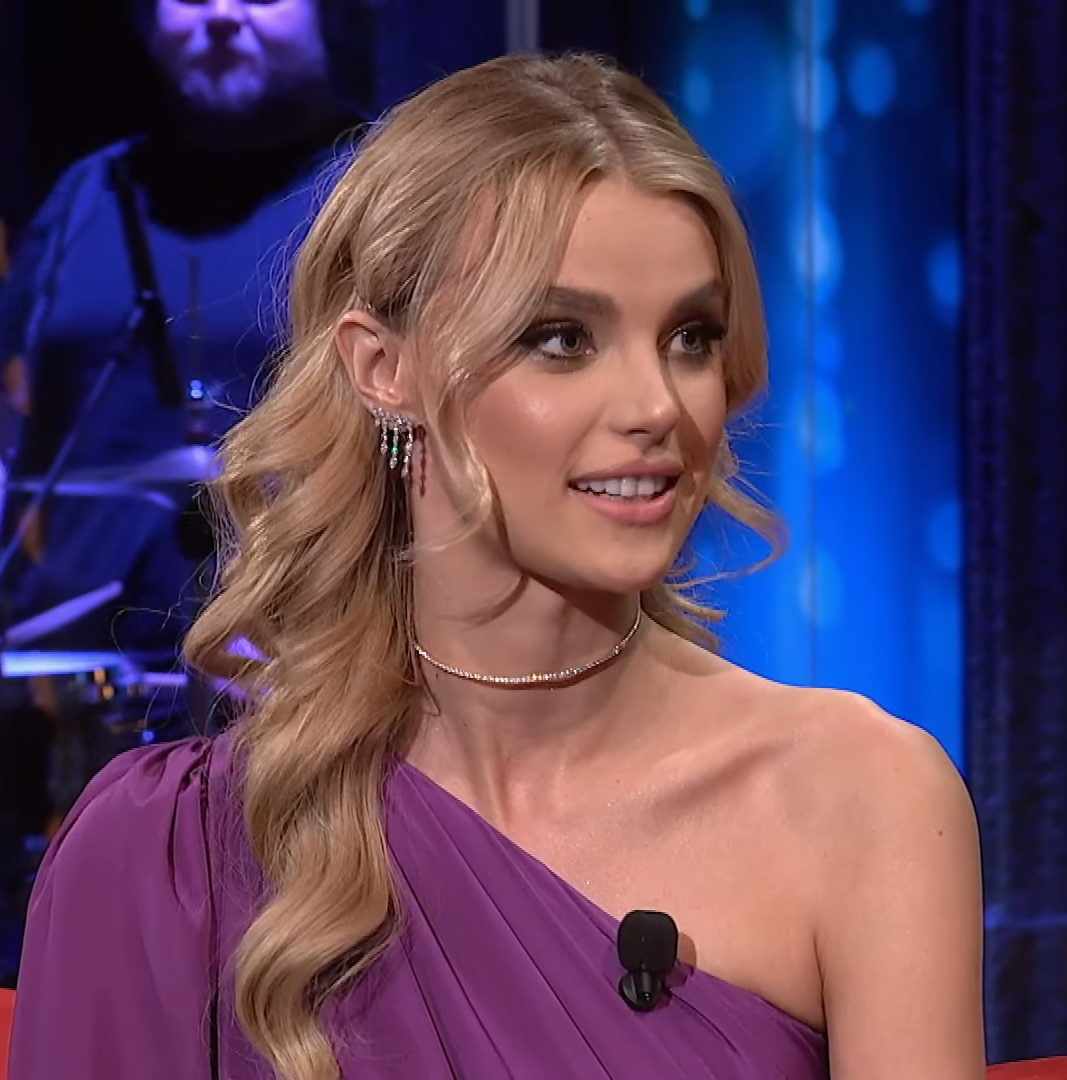
Miss World 2023
Krystyna Pyszková
Czech Republic

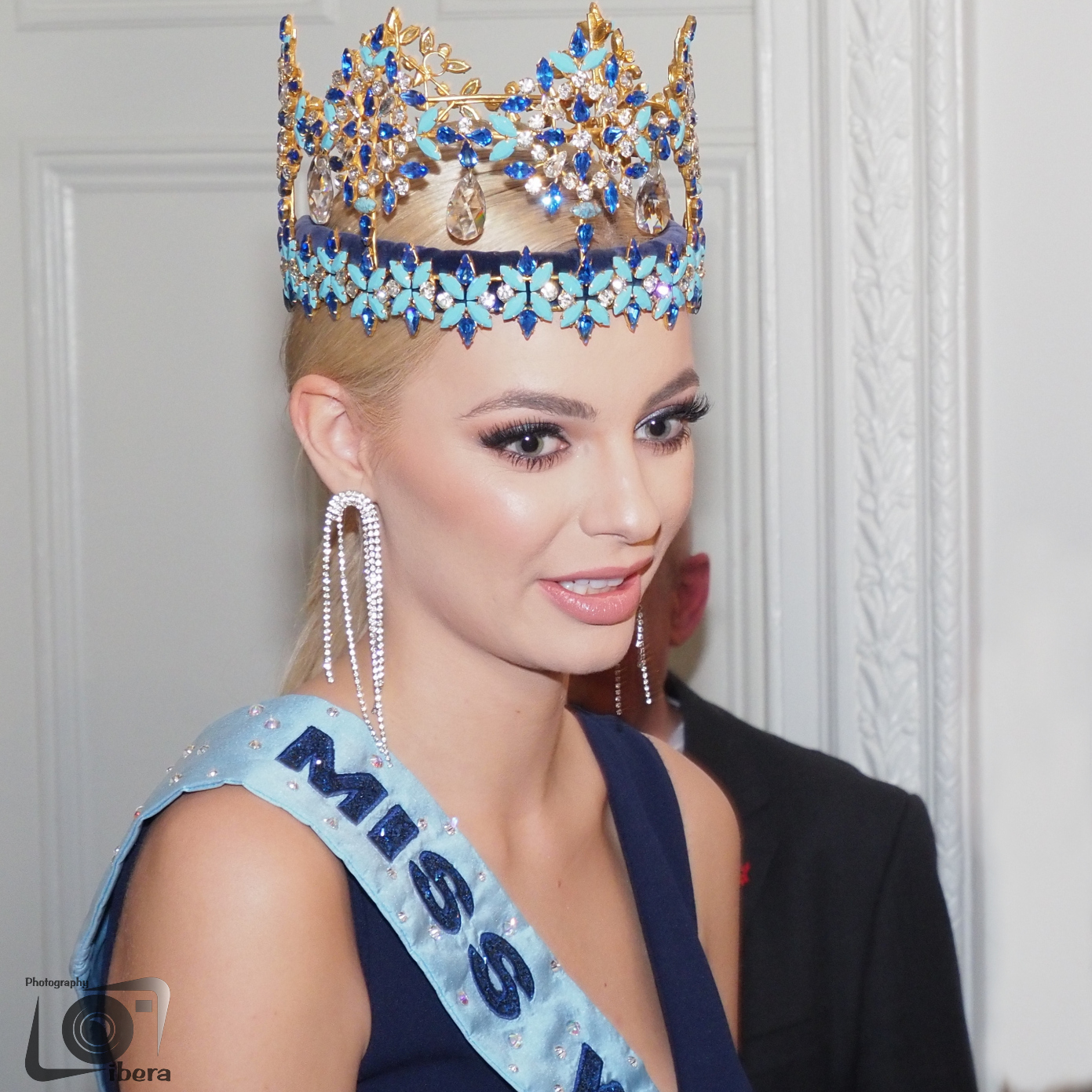
Miss World 2021
Karolina Bielawska
Poland

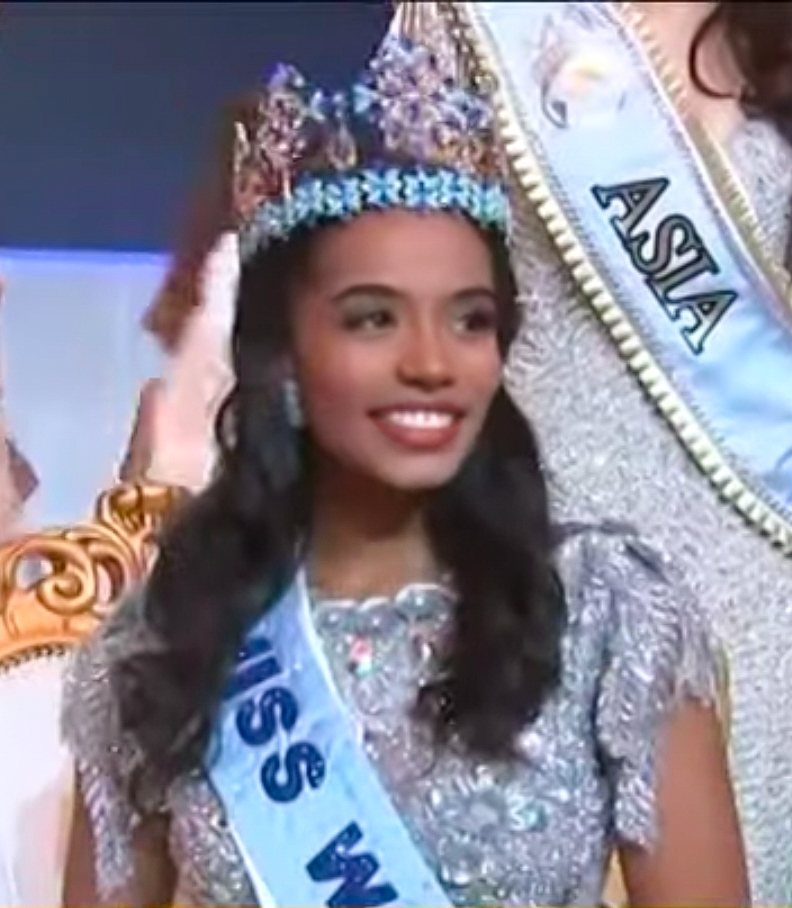
Miss World 2019
Toni-Ann Singh
Jamaica

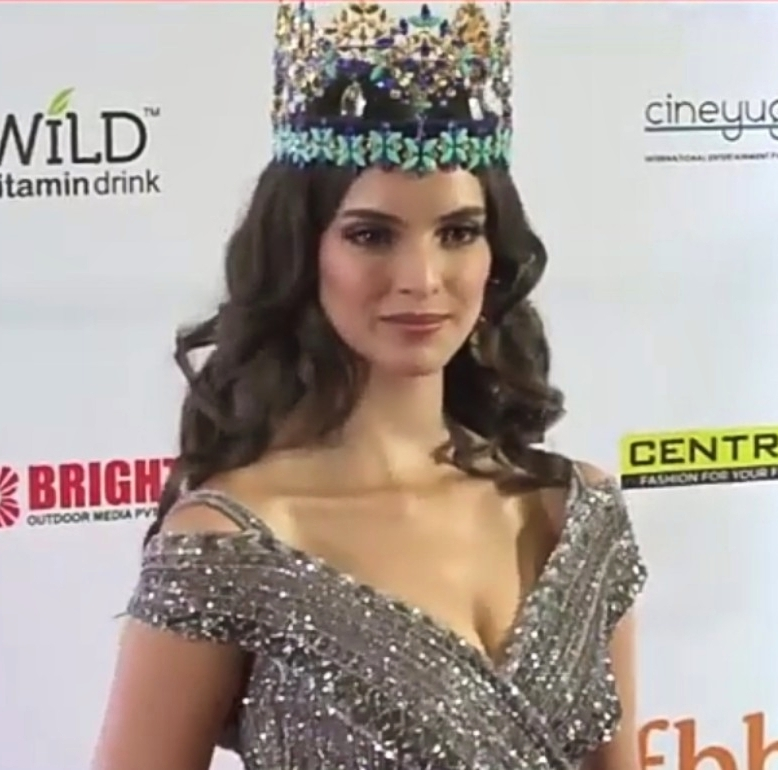
Miss World 2018
Vanessa Ponce
Mexico

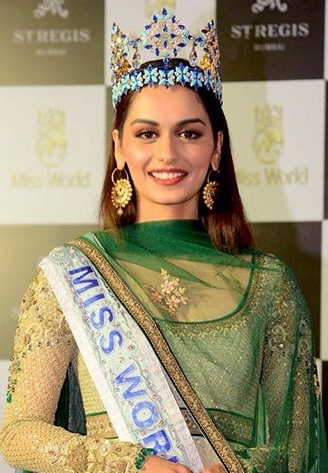
Miss World 2017
Manushi Chhillar
India

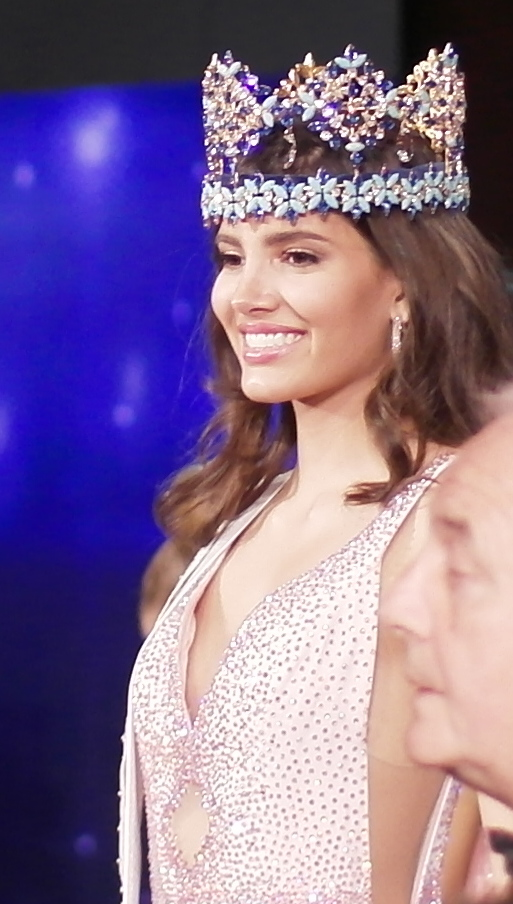
Miss World 2016
Stephanie Del Valle
Puerto Rico

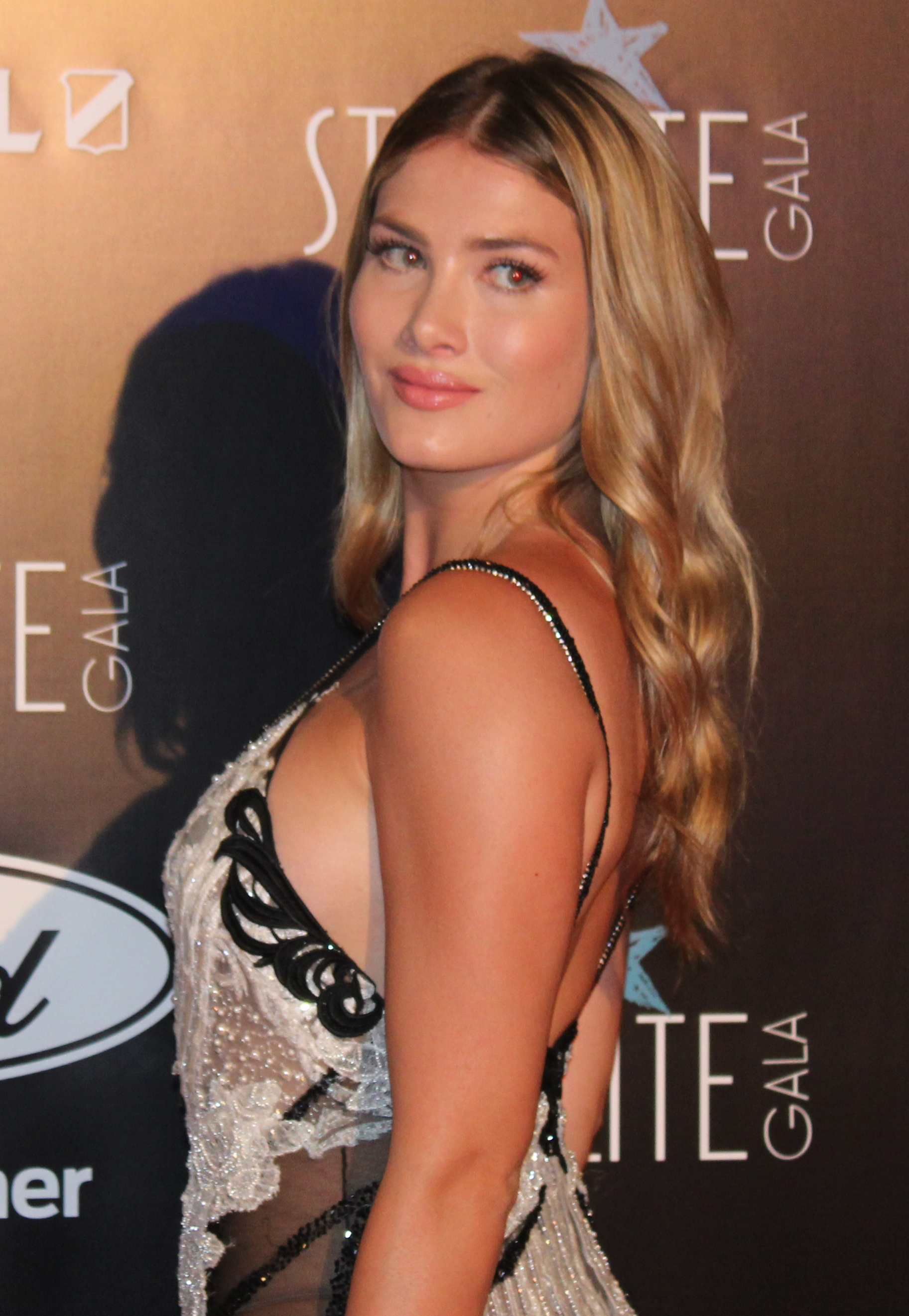
Miss World 2015
Mireia Lalaguna
Spain

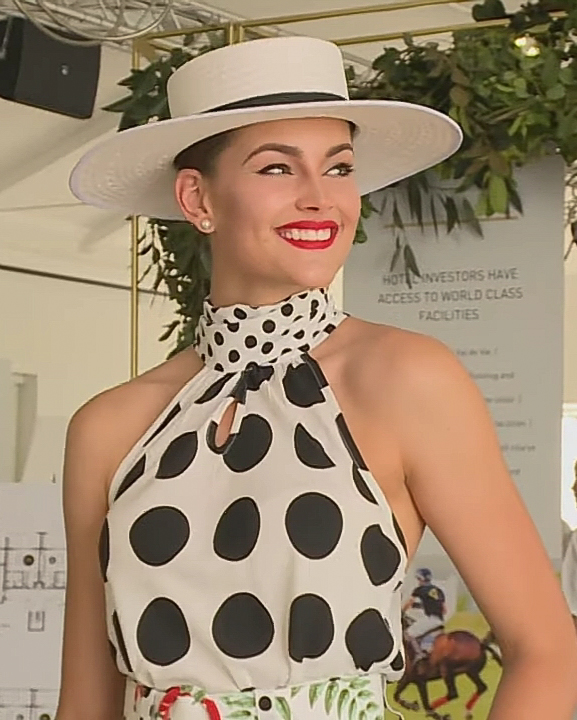
Miss World 2014
Rolene Strauss
South Africa

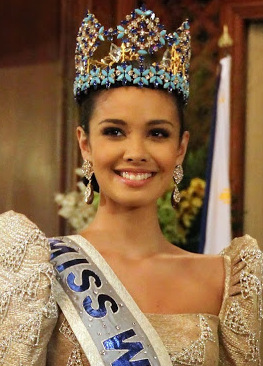
Miss World 2013
Megan Young
Philippines

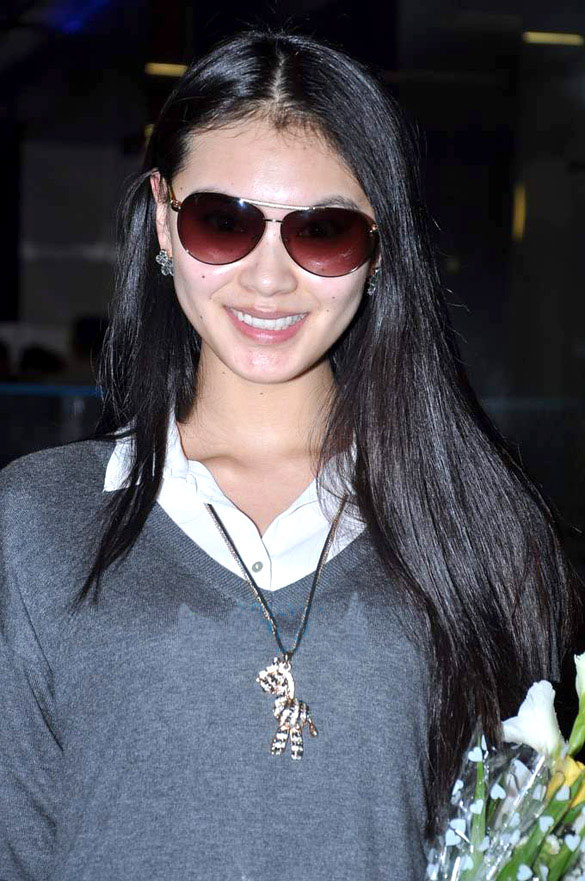
Miss World 2012
Yu Wenxia
China

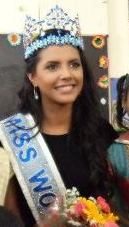
Miss World 2011
Ivian Sarcos
Venezuela

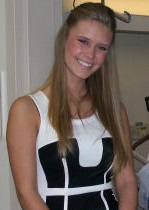
Miss World 2010
Alexandria Mills
United States

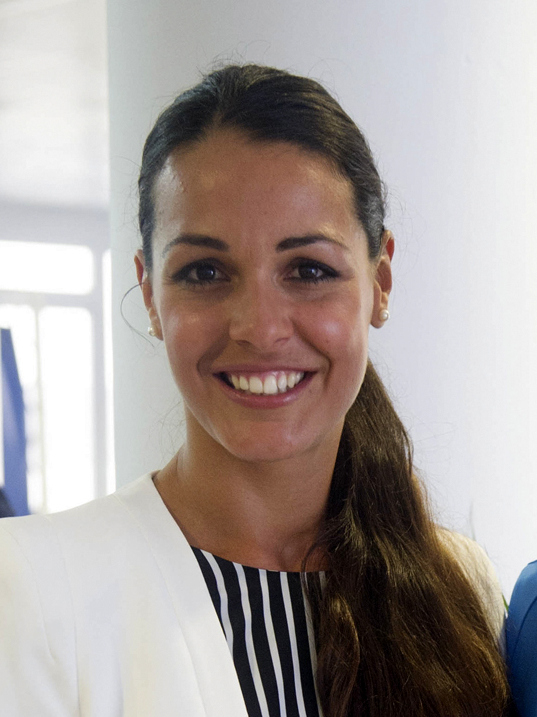
Miss World 2009
Kaiane Aldorino
Gibraltar

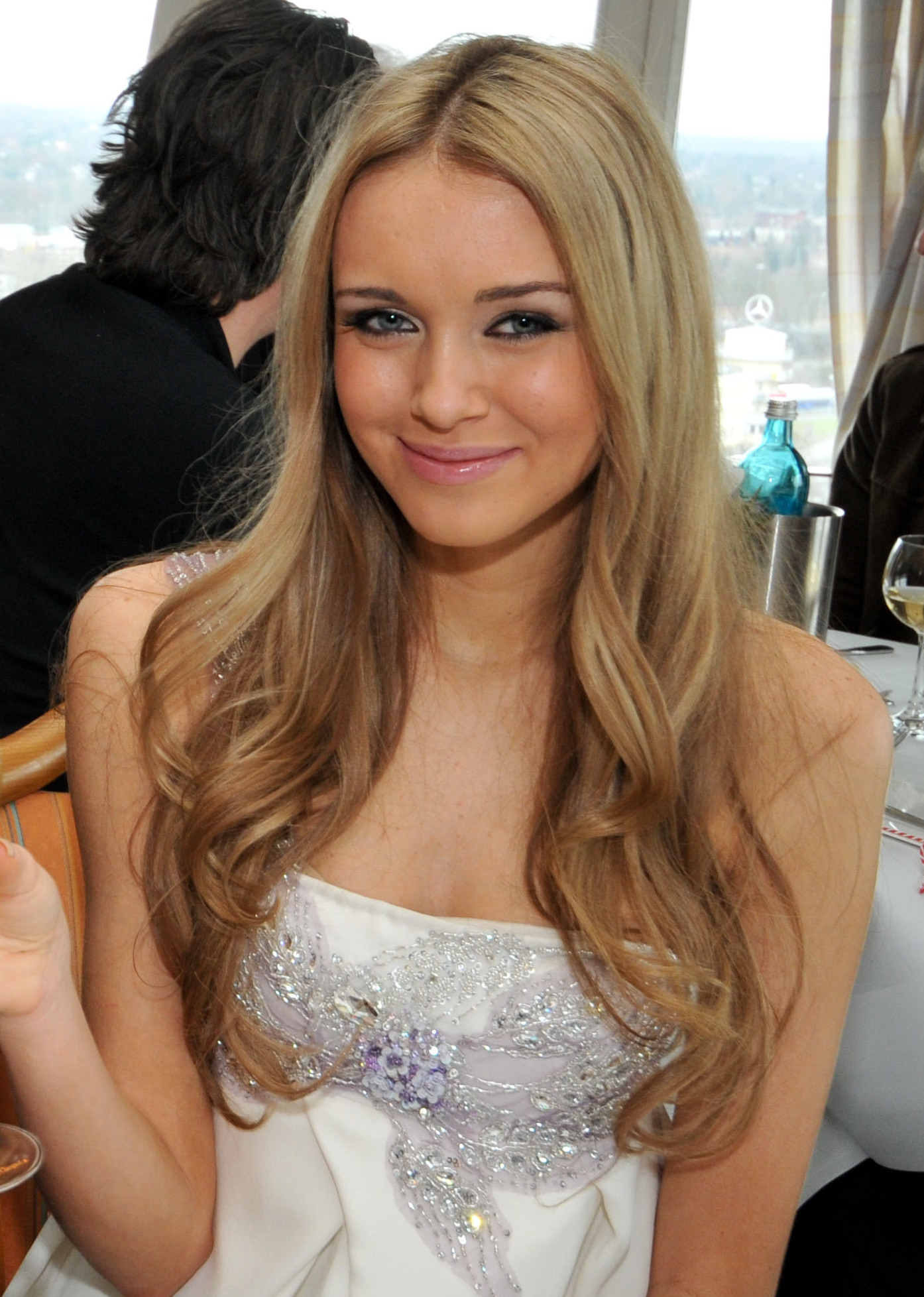
Miss World 2008
Ksenia Sukhinova
Russia

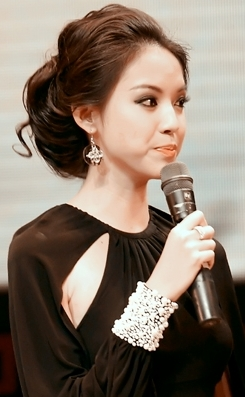
Miss World 2007
Zhang Zilin
China

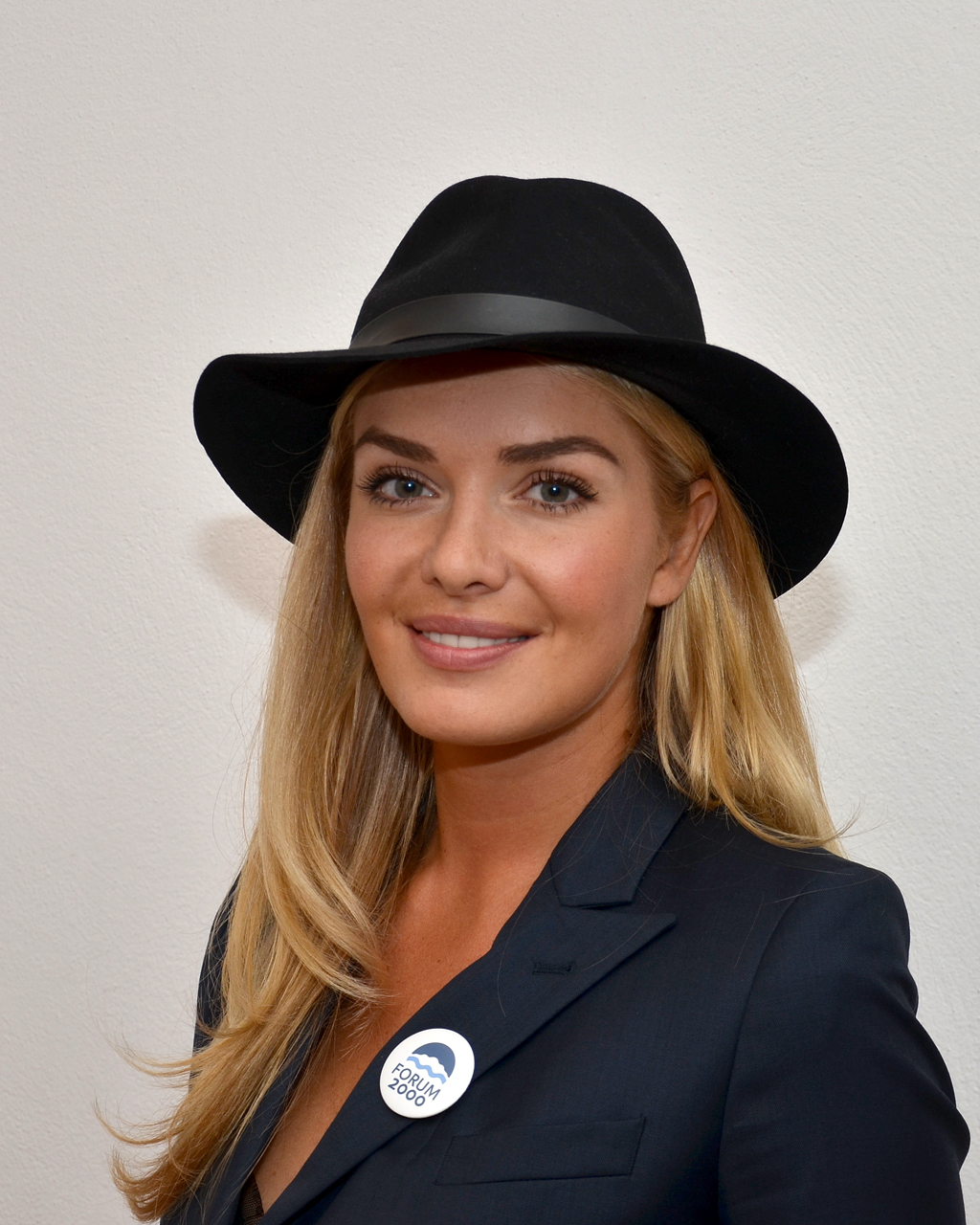
Miss World 2006
Taťána Kuchařová
Czech Republic

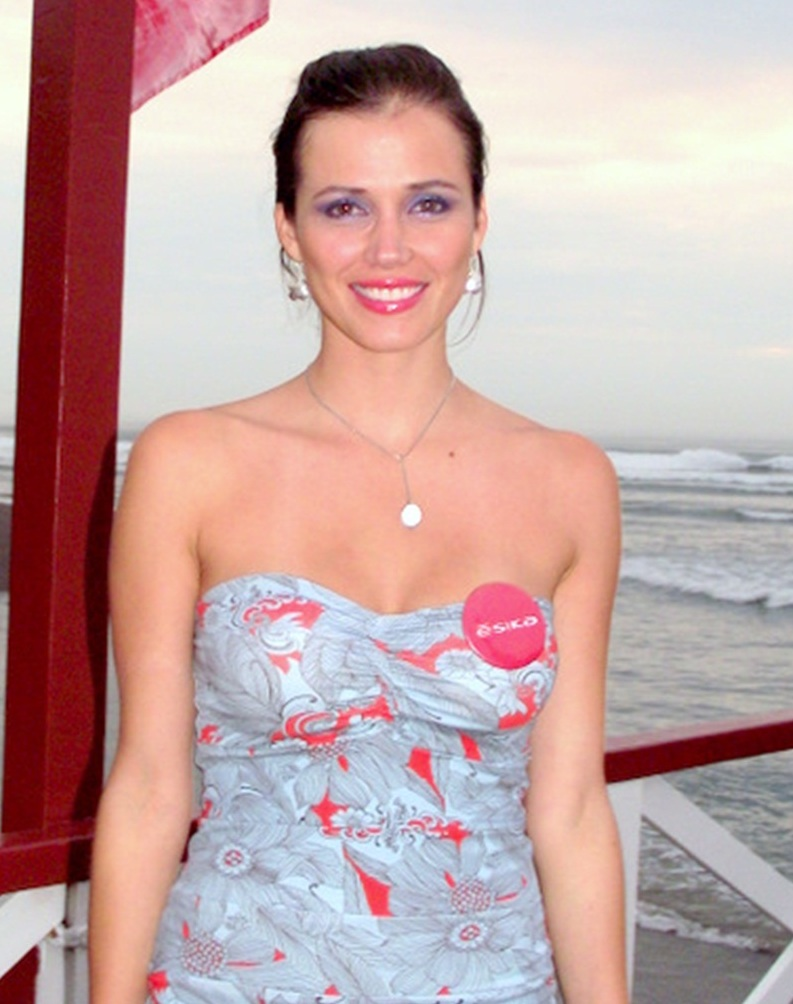
Miss World 2004
María Julia Mantilla
Peru

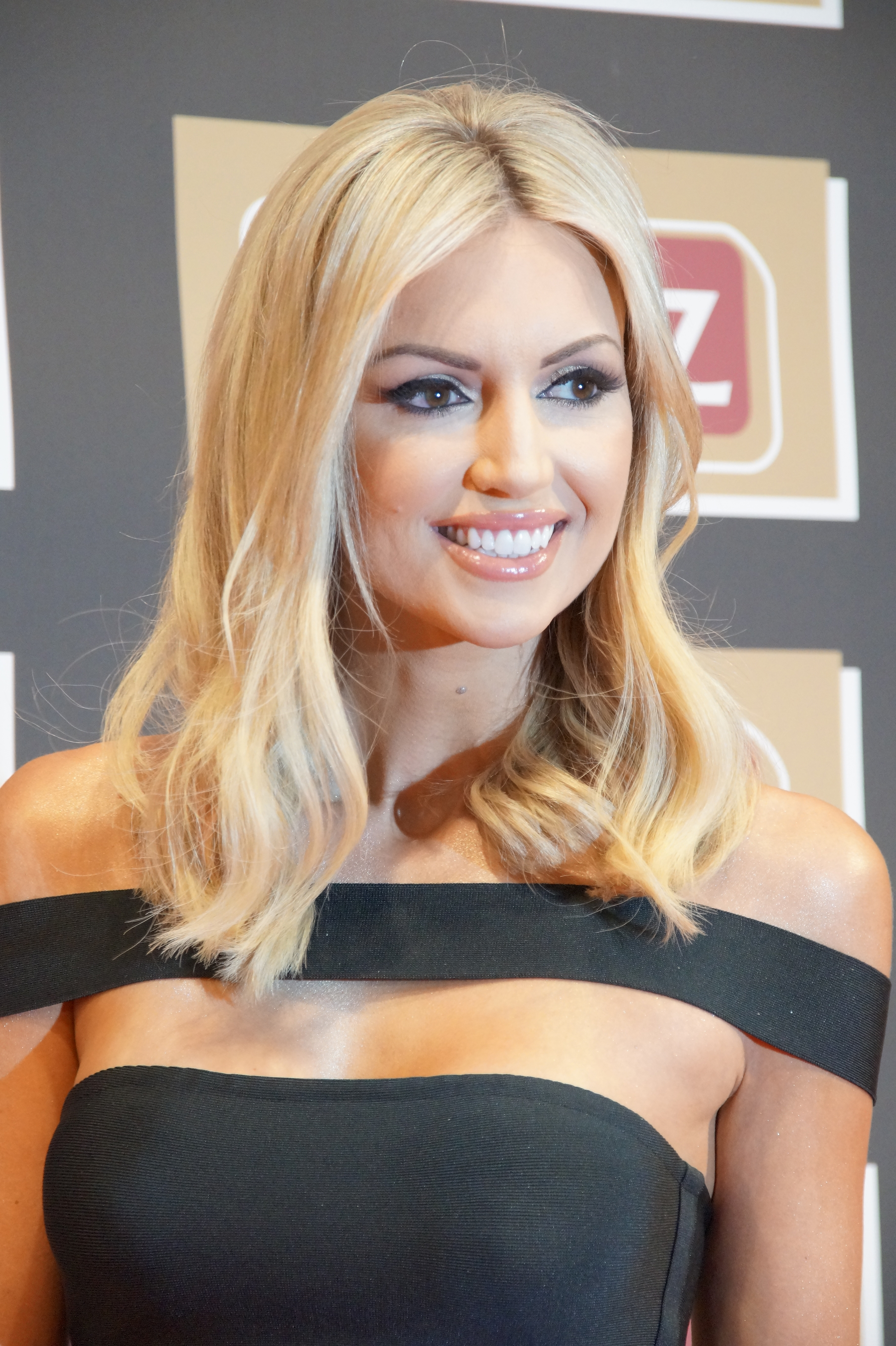
Miss World 2003
Rosanna Davison
Ireland

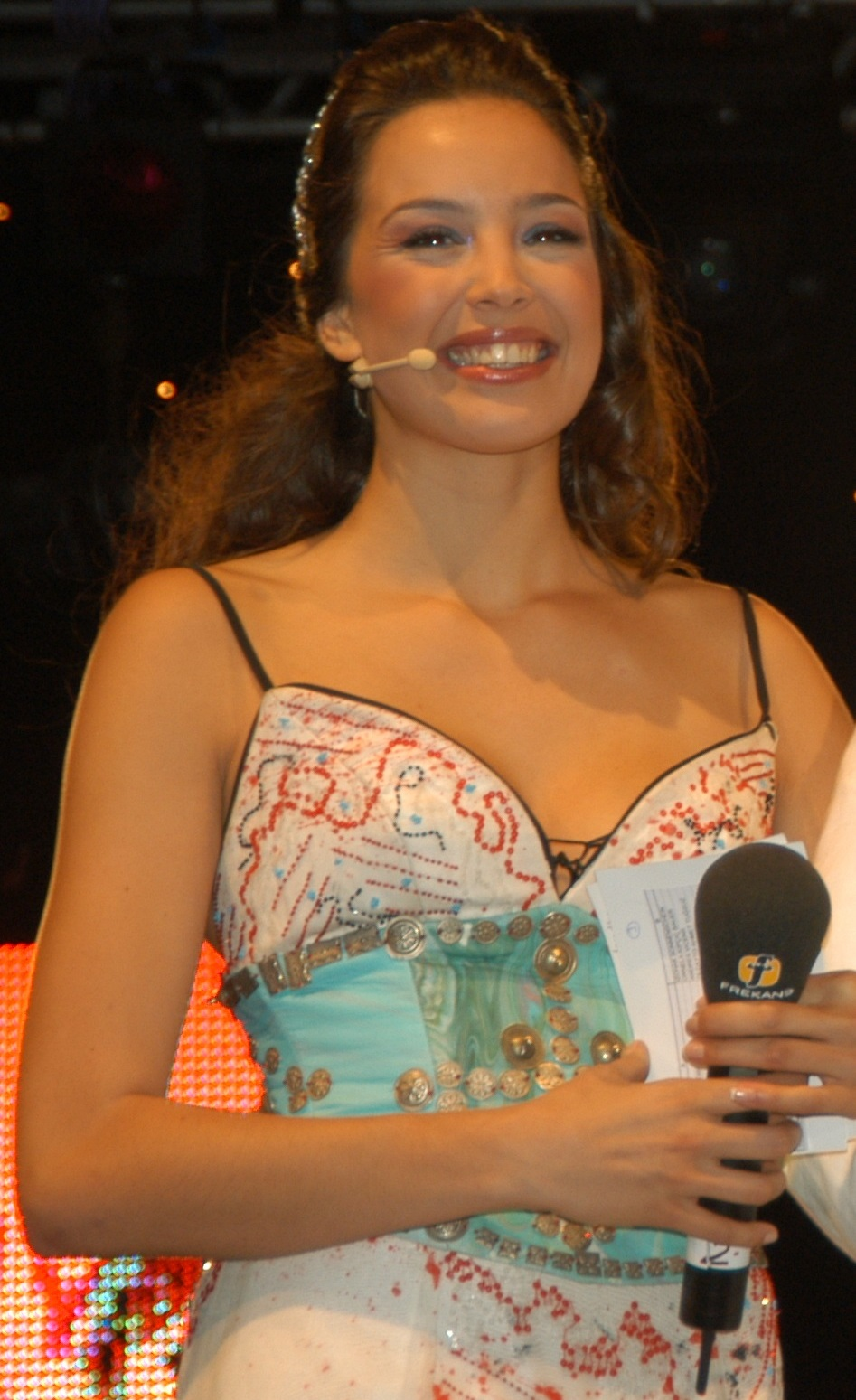
Miss World 2002
Azra Akın
Turkey

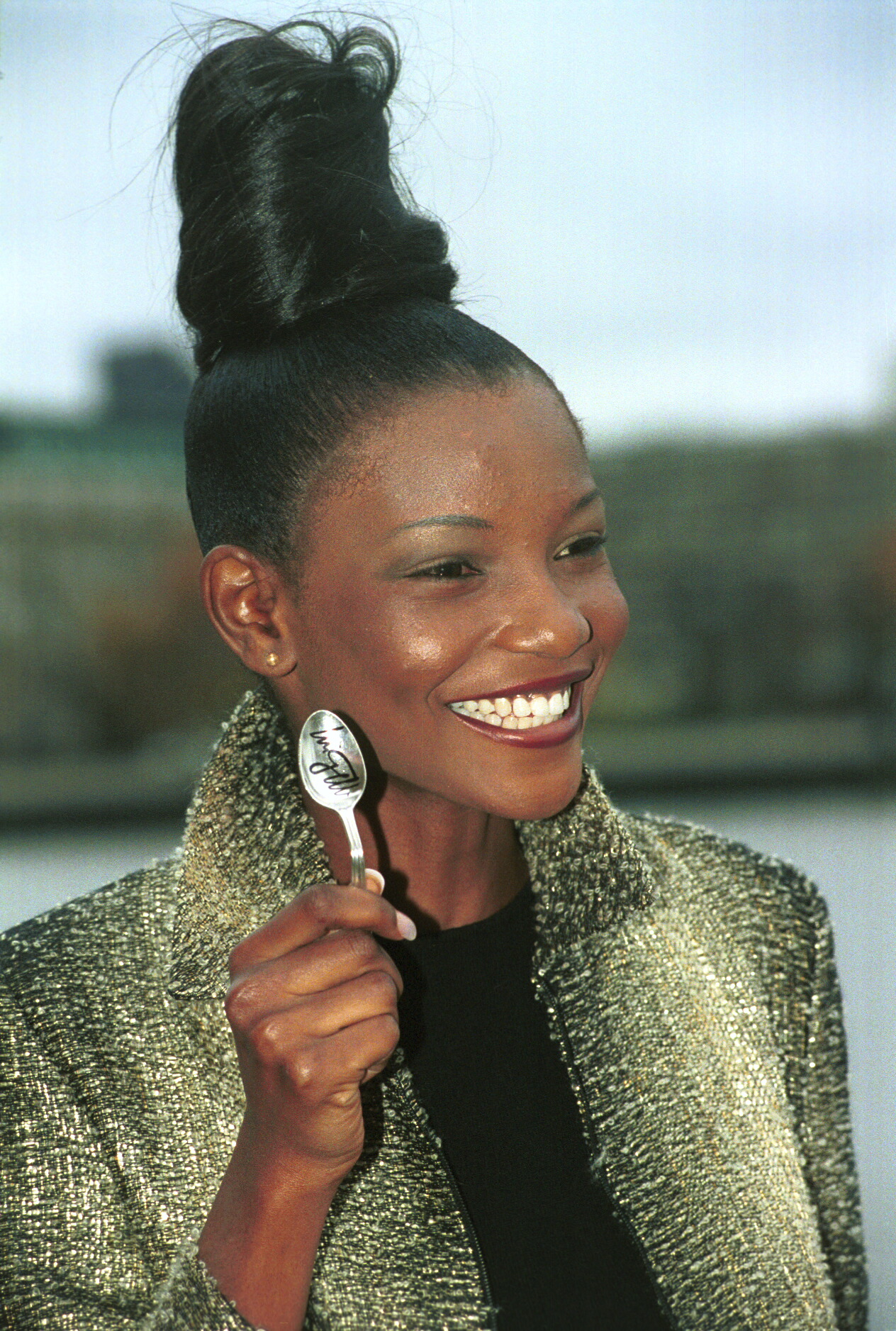
Miss World 2001
Agbani Darego
Nigeria

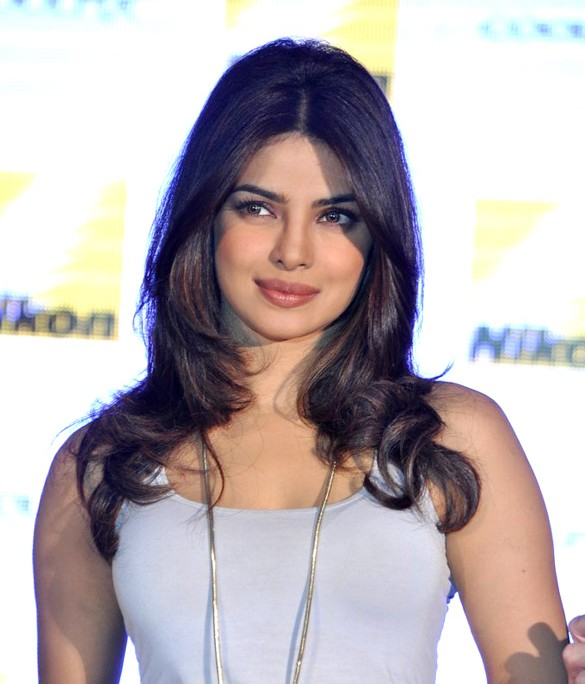
Miss World 2000
Priyanka Chopra
India

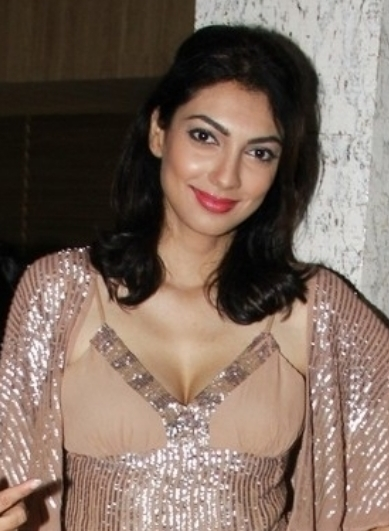
Miss World 1999
Yukta Mookhey
India

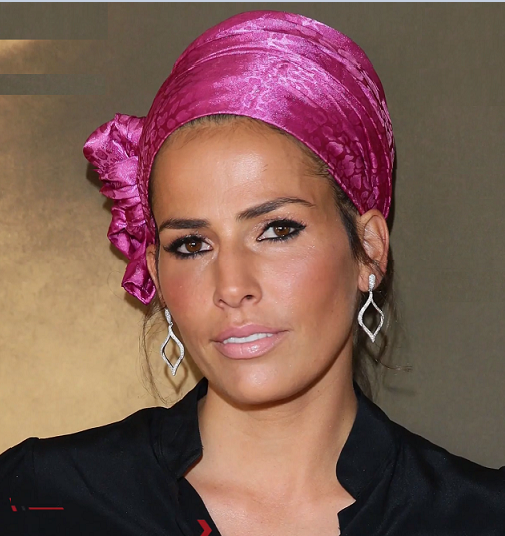
Miss World 1998
Linor Abargil
Israel

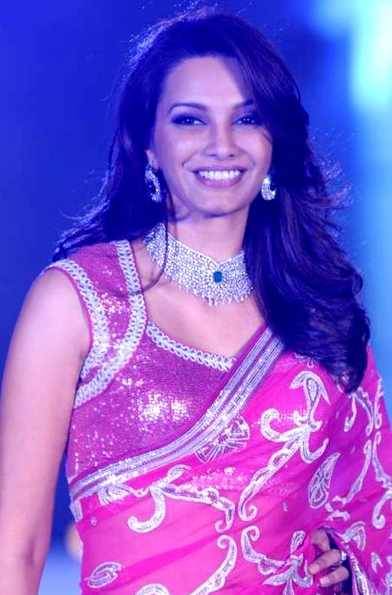
Miss World 1997
Diana Hayden
India

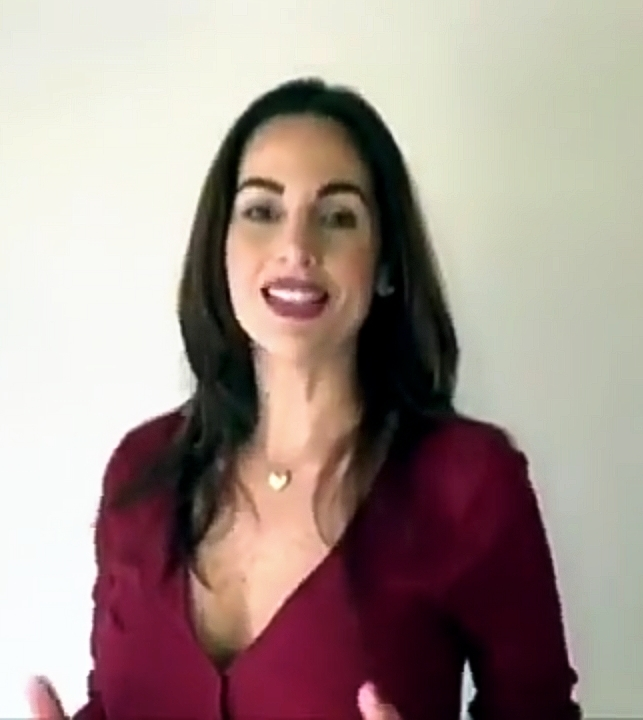
Miss World 1995
Jacqueline Aguilera
Venezuela

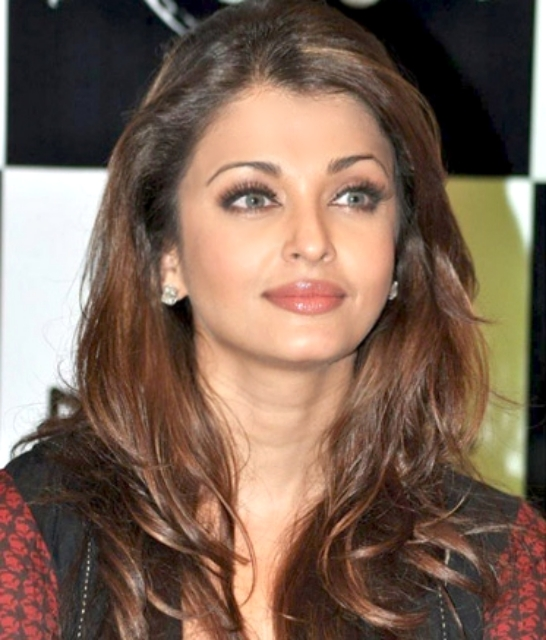
Miss World 1994
Aishwarya Rai
India

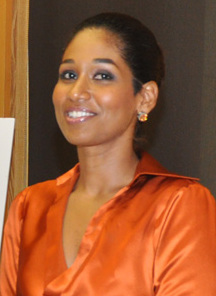
Miss World 1993
Lisa Hanna
Jamaica

Miss World 1992
Julia Kourotchkina
Russia

Miss World 1991
Ninibeth Leal
Venezuela

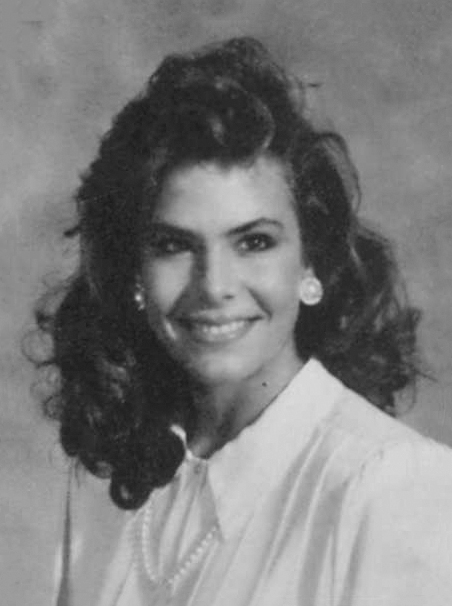
Miss World 1990
Gina Tolleson
United States

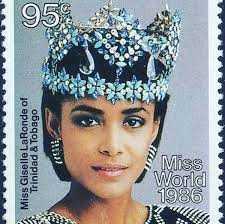
Miss World 1986
Giselle Laronde
Trinidad and Tobago

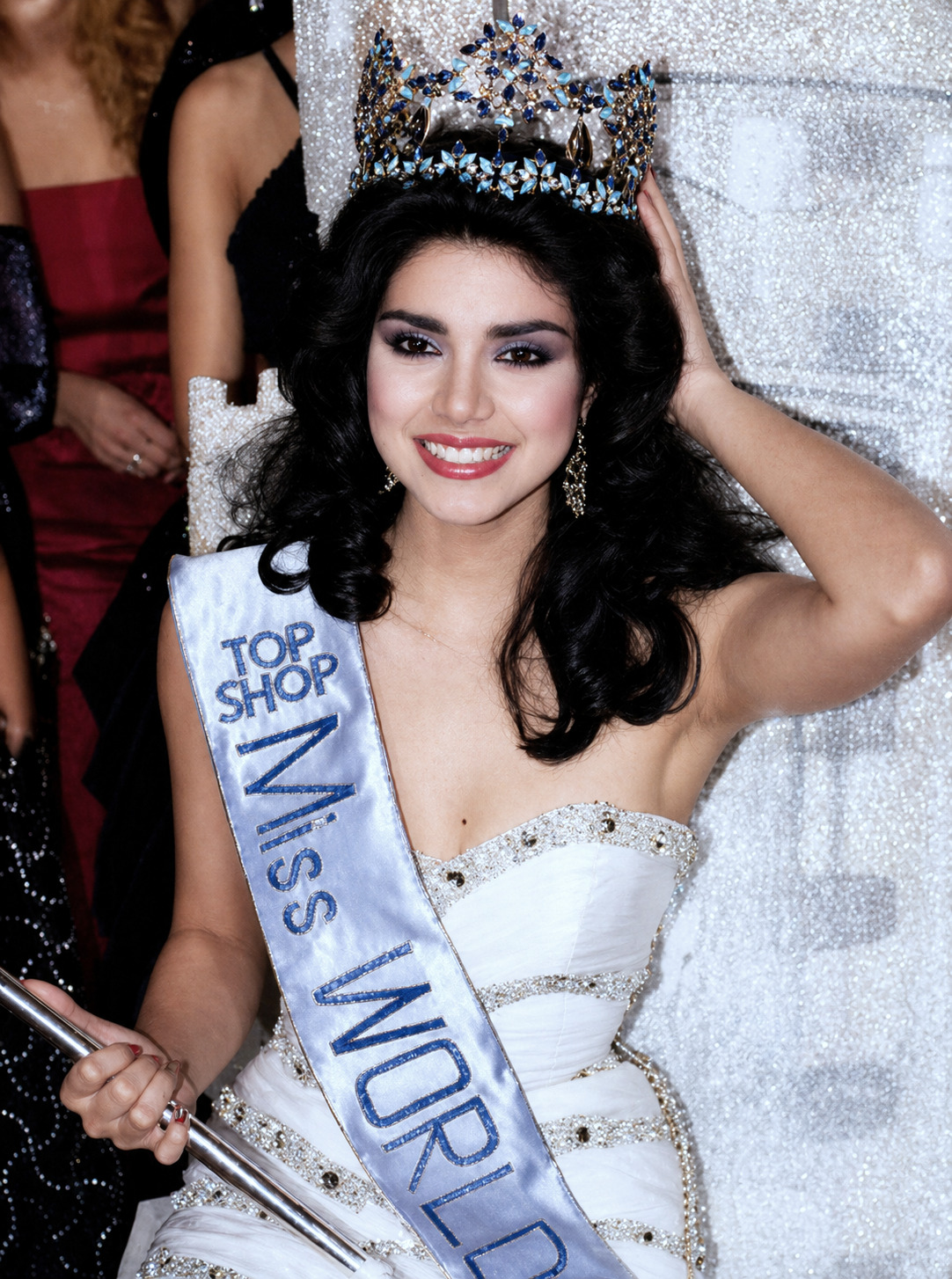
Miss World 1984
Astrid Carolina Herrera
Venezuela

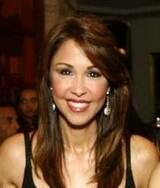
Miss World 1982
Mariasela Álvarez
Dominican Republic

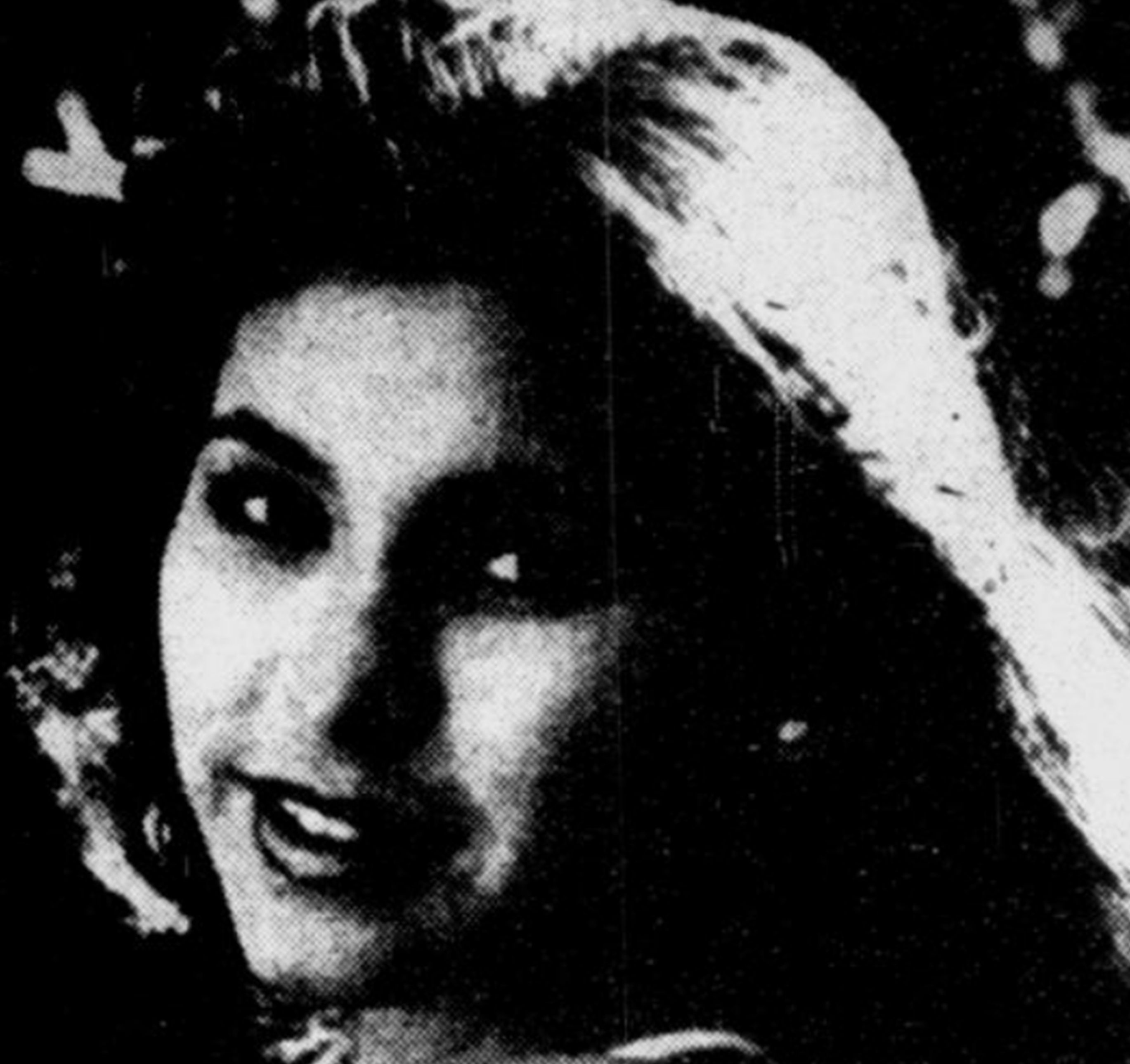
Miss World 1980
Kimberley Santos
Guam

Miss World 1979
Gina Swainson
Bermuda

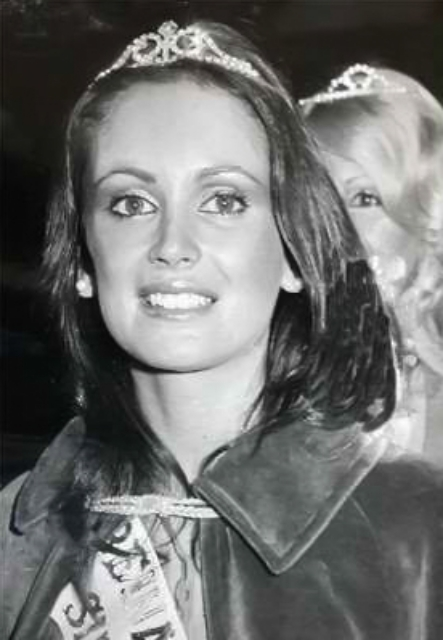
Miss World 1978
Silvana Suárez
Argentina

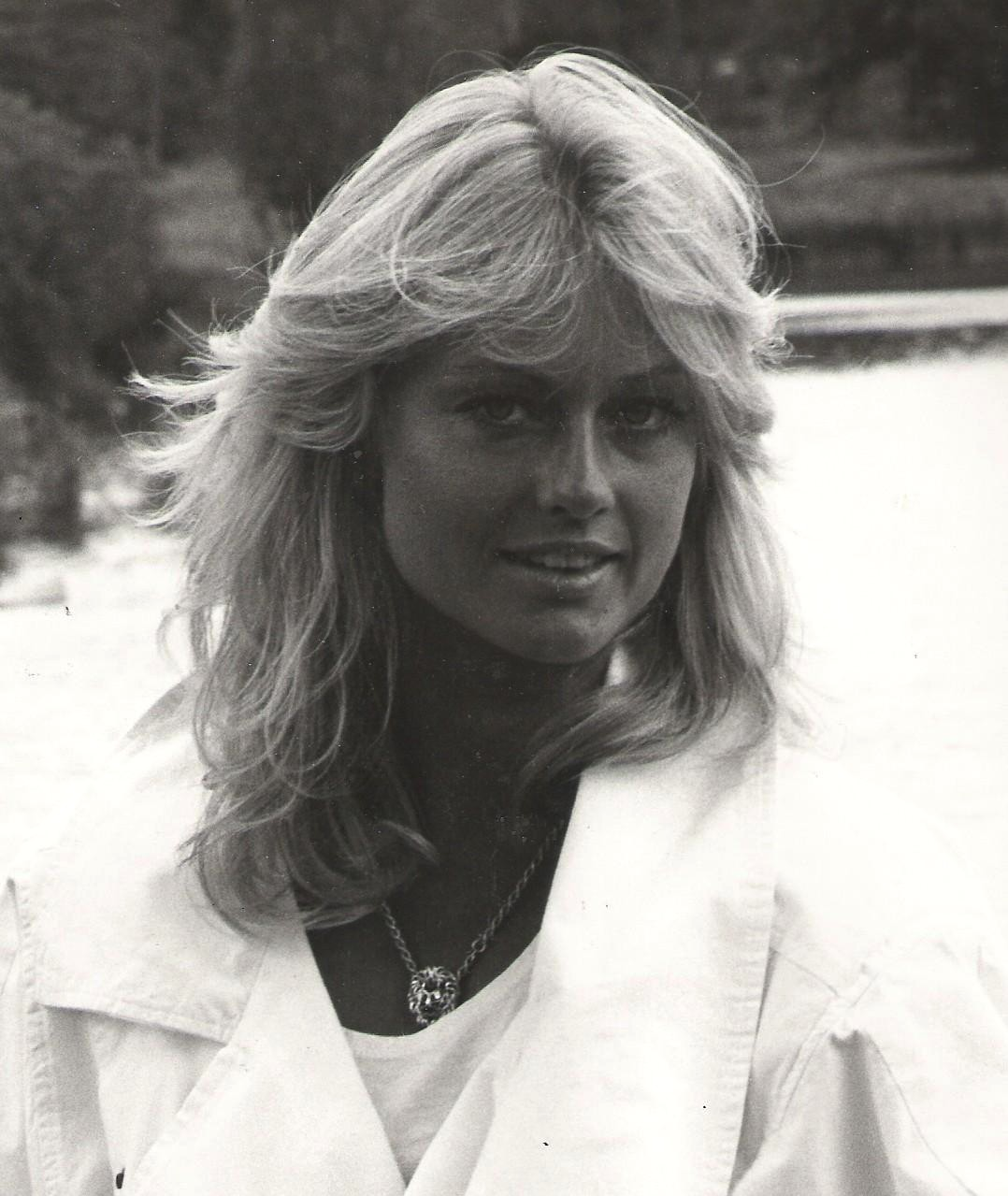
Miss World 1977
Mary Stävin
Sweden

Miss World 1976
Cindy Breakspeare
Jamaica

Miss World 1975
Wilnelia Merced
Puerto Rico

Miss World 1974
Anneline Kriel
South Africa

Miss World 1974 (resigned)
Helen Morgan
United Kingdom

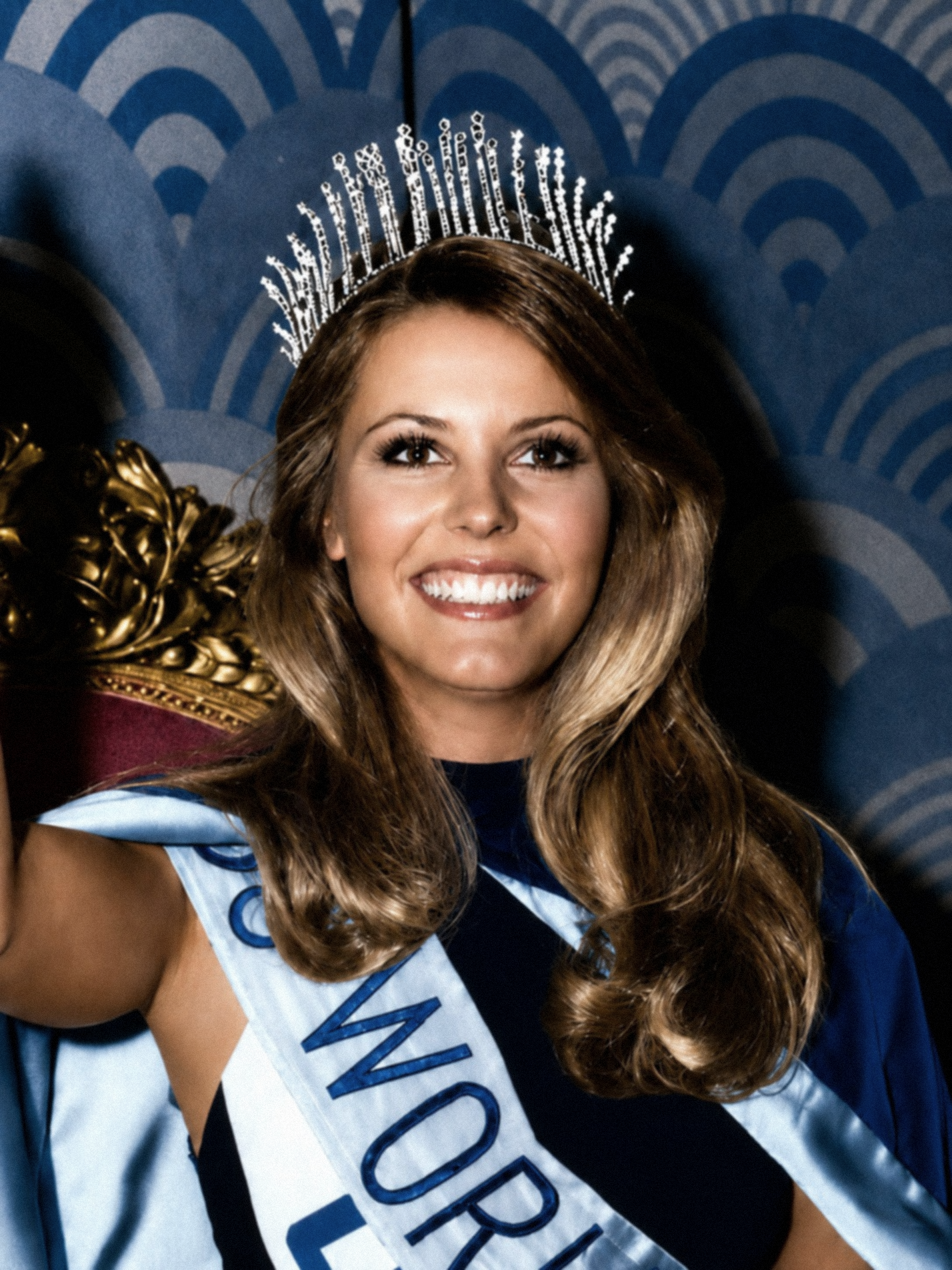
Miss World 1973
Marjorie Wallace
United States

Miss World 1972
Belinda Green
Australia

Miss World 1971
Lúcia Petterle
Brazil

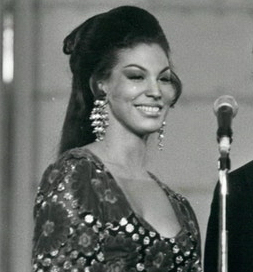
Miss World 1970
Jennifer Hosten
Grenada

Miss World 1969
Eva Rueber-Staier
Austria

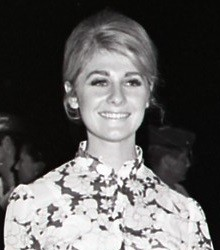
Miss World 1968
Penelope Plummer
Australia

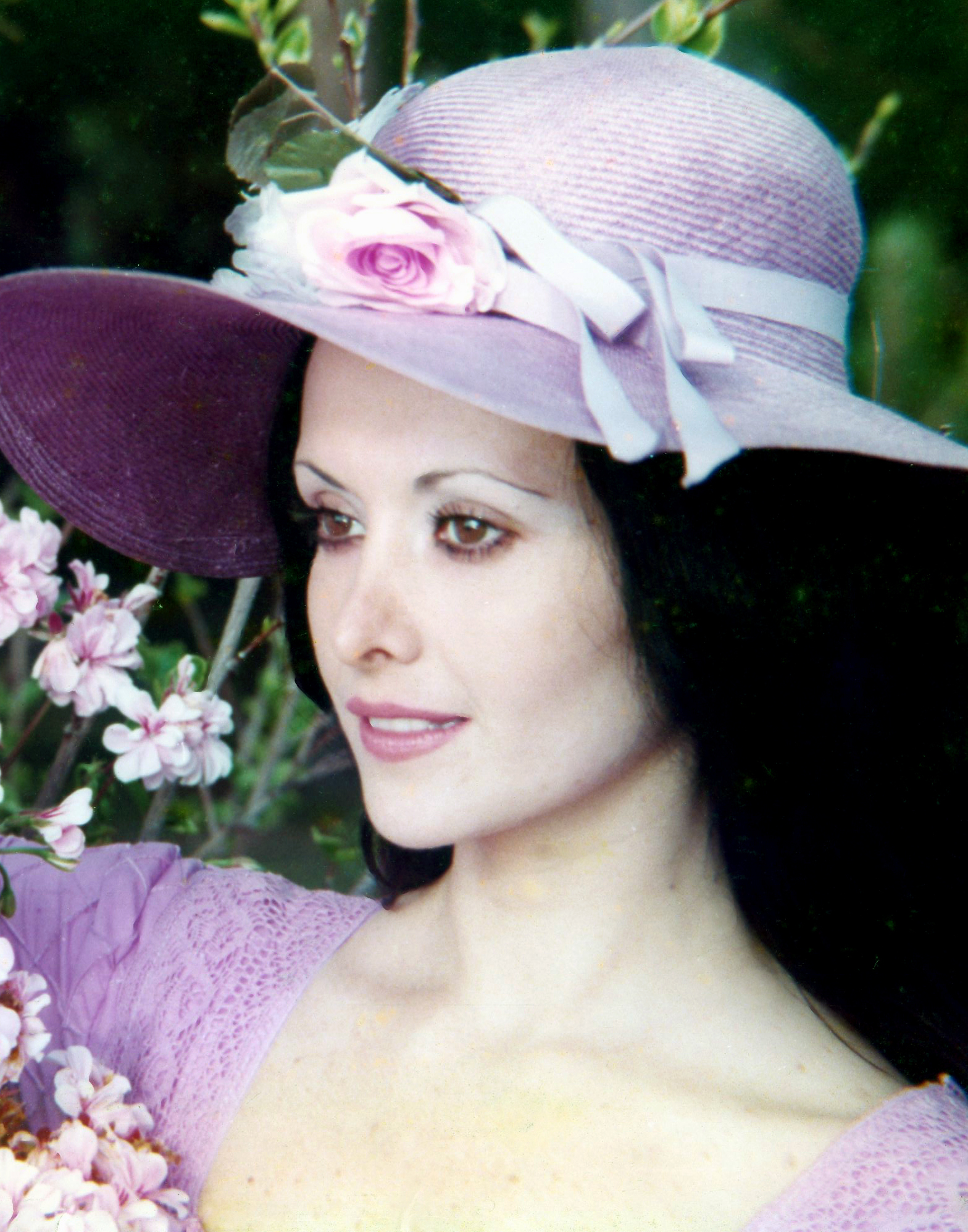
Miss World 1967
Madeline Hartog-Bel
Peru

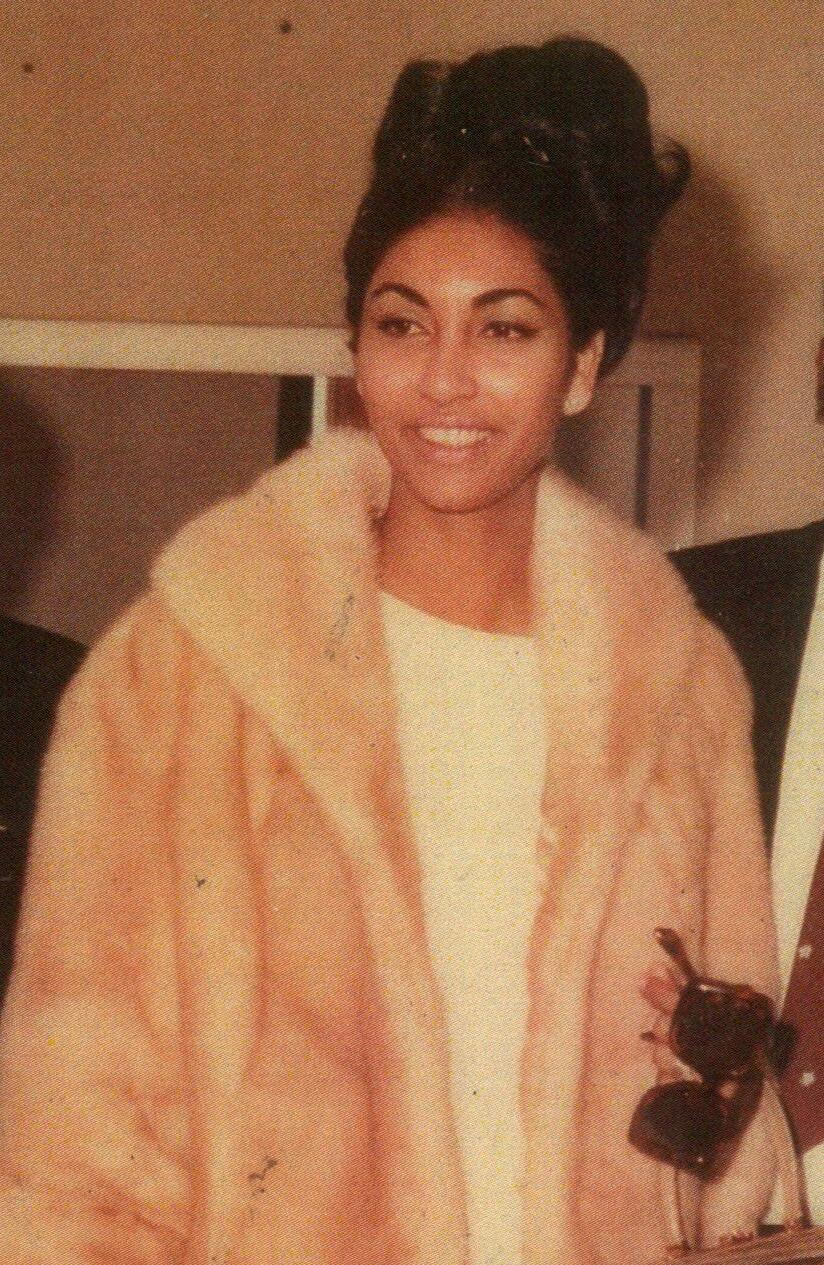
Miss World 1966
Reita Faria
India

Miss World 1965
Lesley Langley
United Kingdom

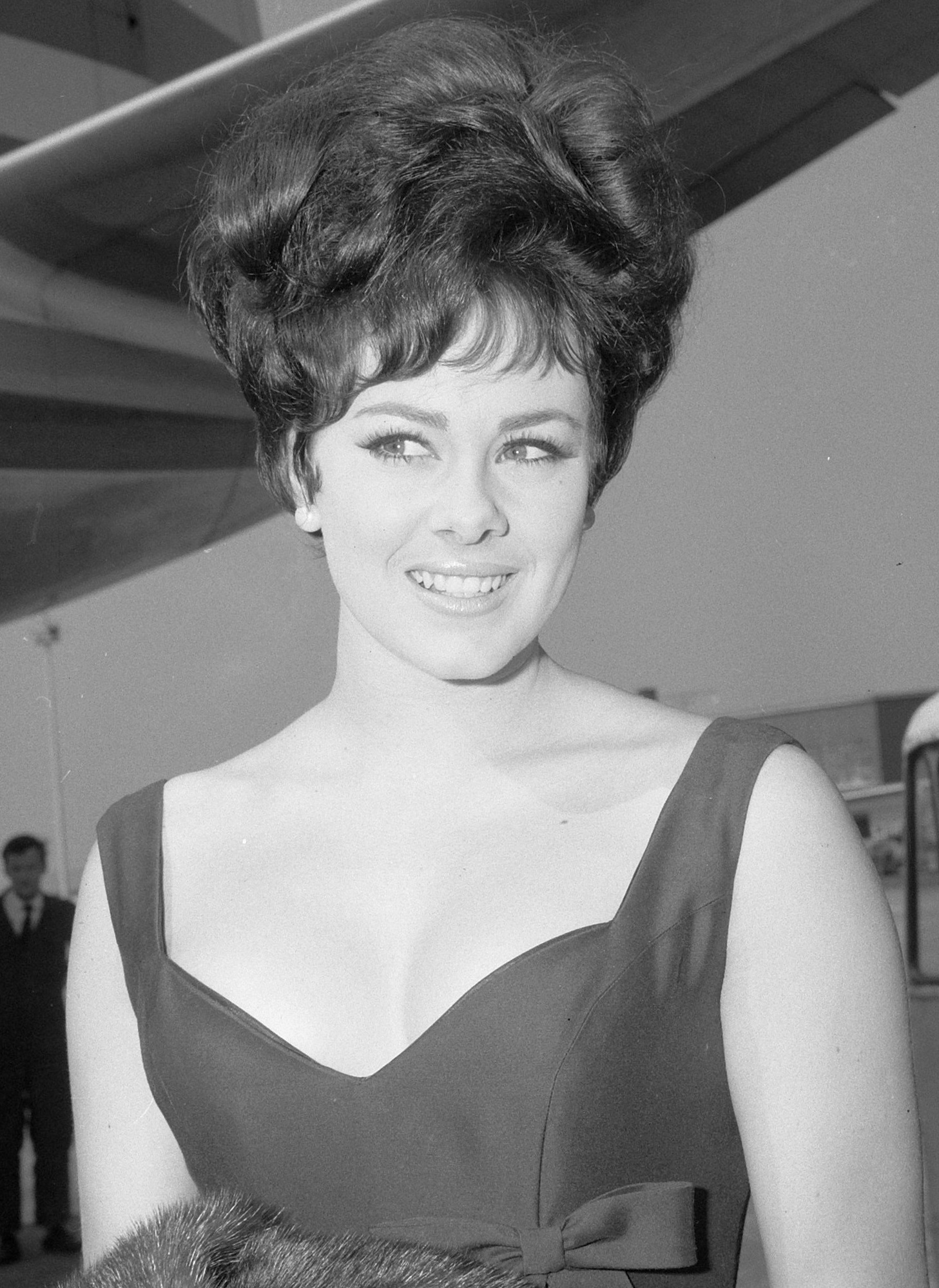
Miss World 1964
Ann Sidney
United Kingdom

Miss World 1963
Carole Crawford
Jamaica

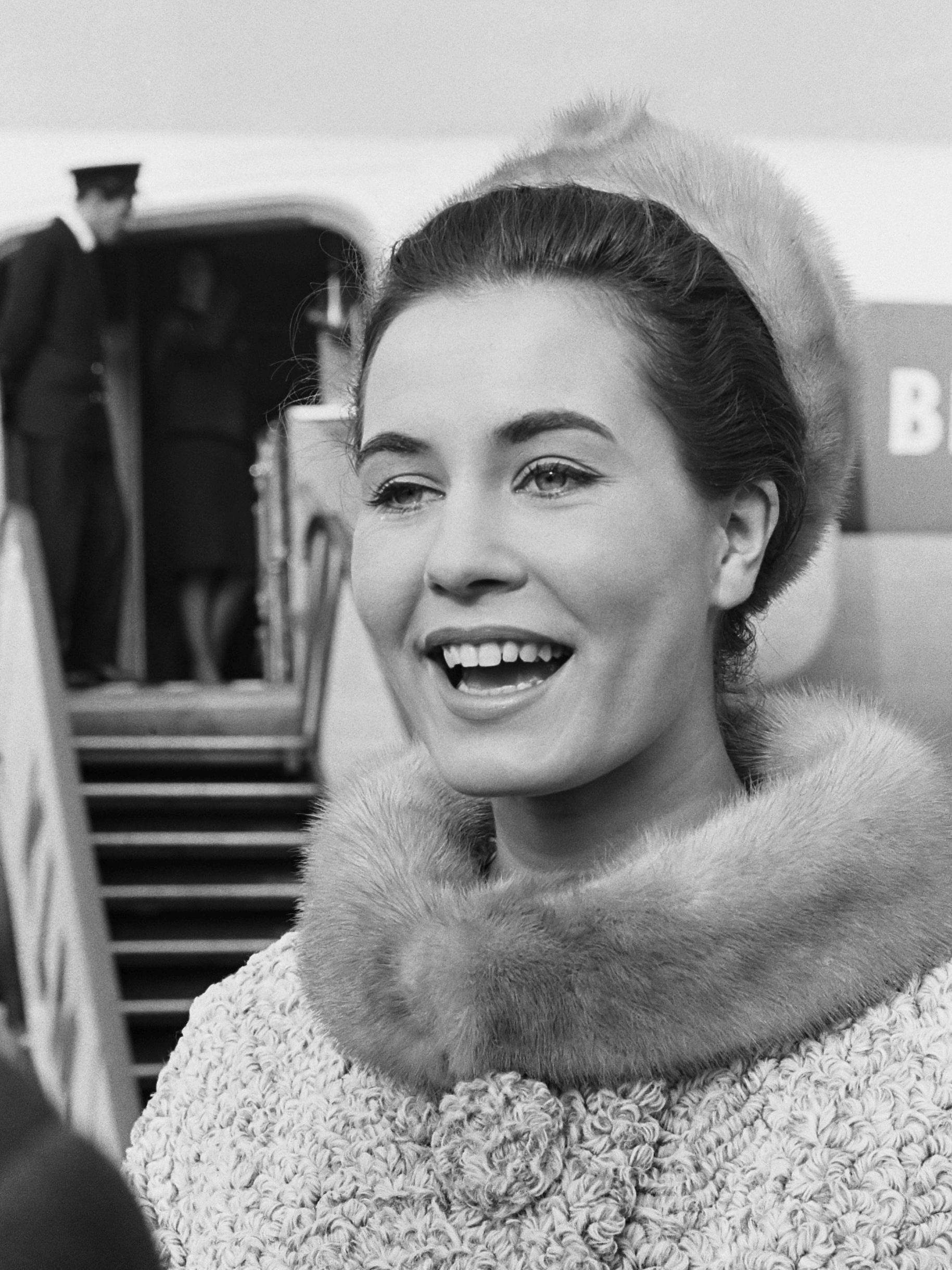
Miss World 1962
Catharina Lodders
Netherlands

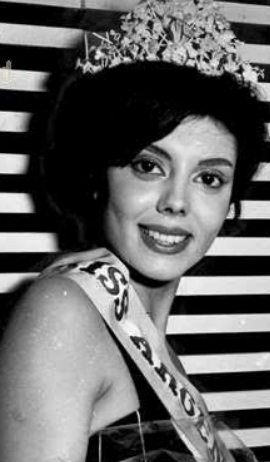
Miss World 1960
Norma Cappagli
Argentina

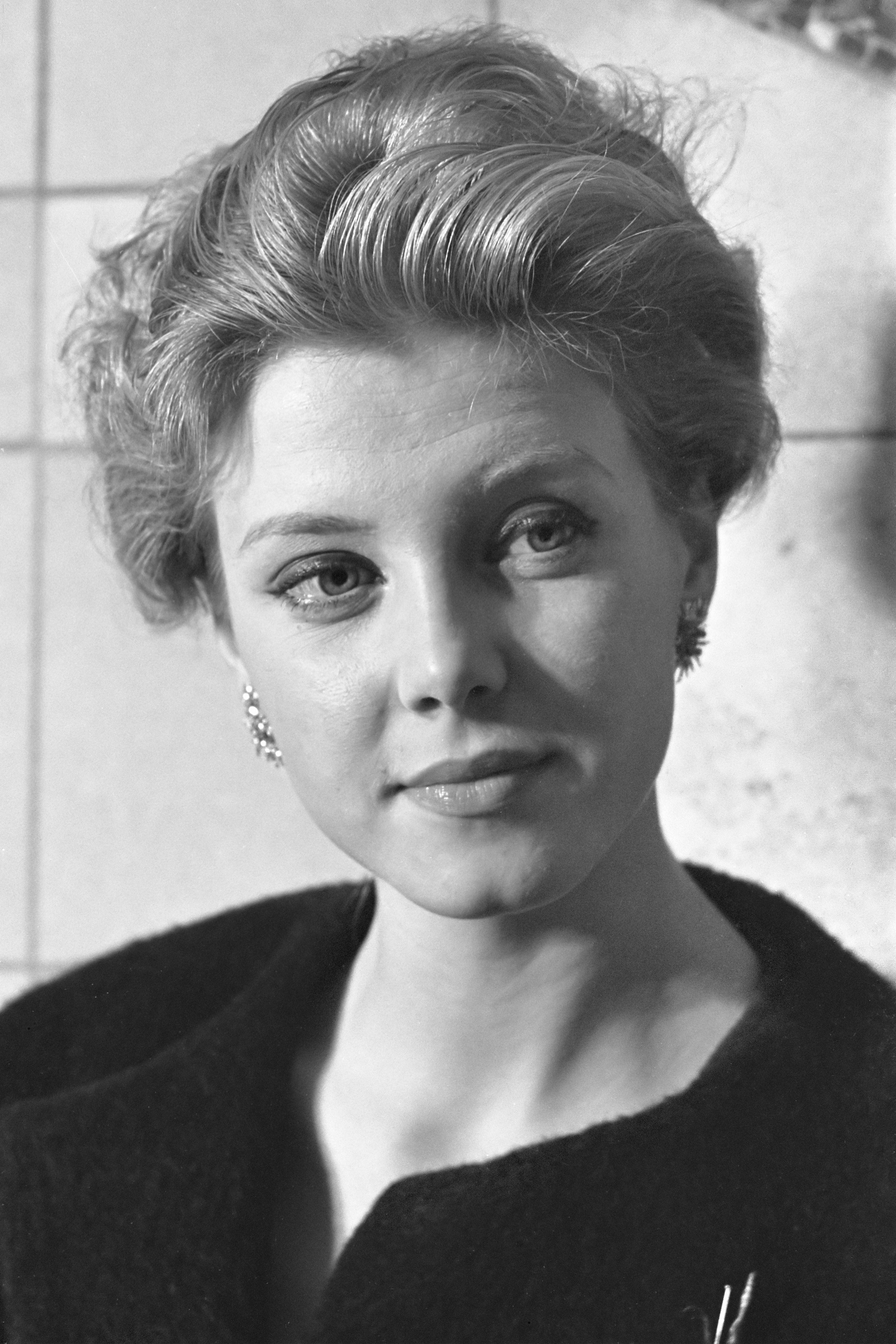
Miss World 1959
Corine Rottschäfer
Netherlands

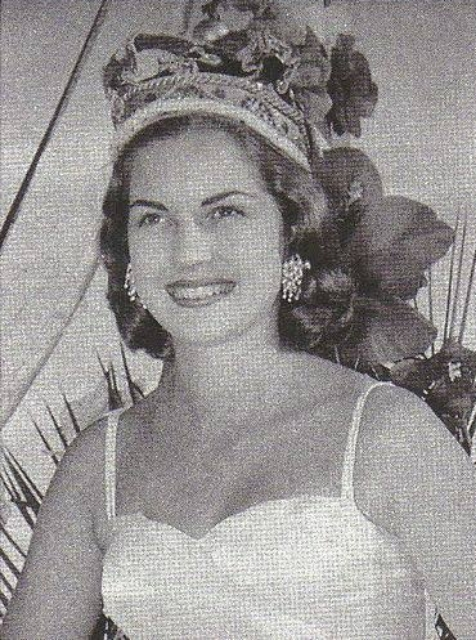
Miss World 1958
Penelope Coelen
South Africa

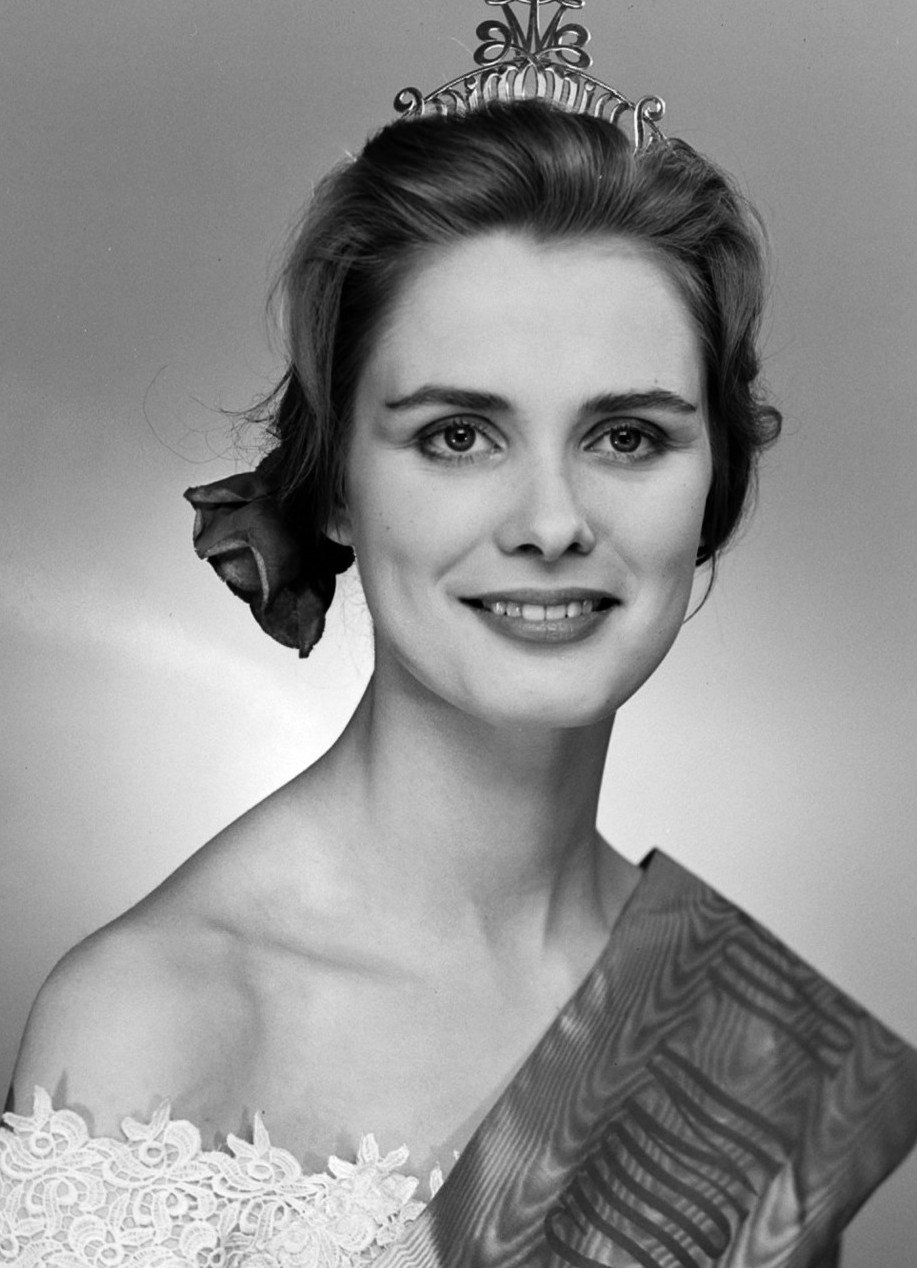
Miss World 1957
Marita Lindahl
Finland

Miss World 1956
Petra Schürmann
Germany

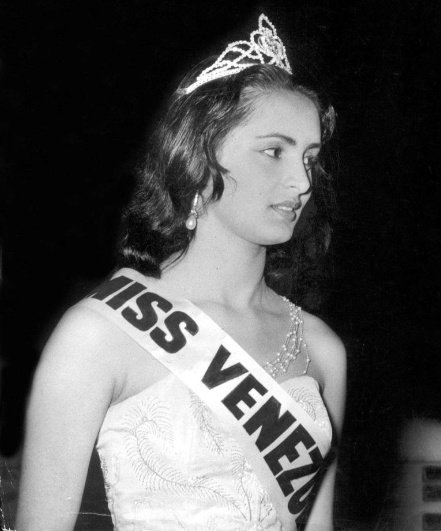
Miss World 1955
Susana Duijm
Venezuela

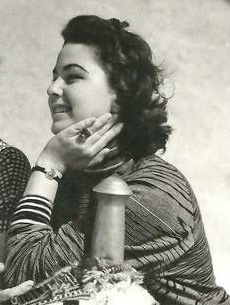
Miss World 1954
Antigone Costanda
Egypt

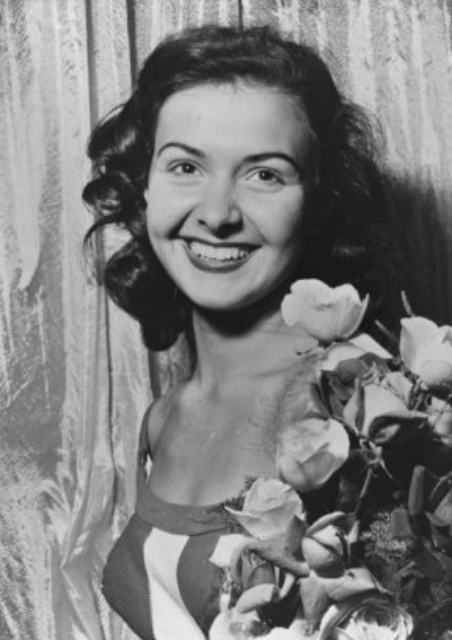
Miss World 1953
Denise Perrier
France

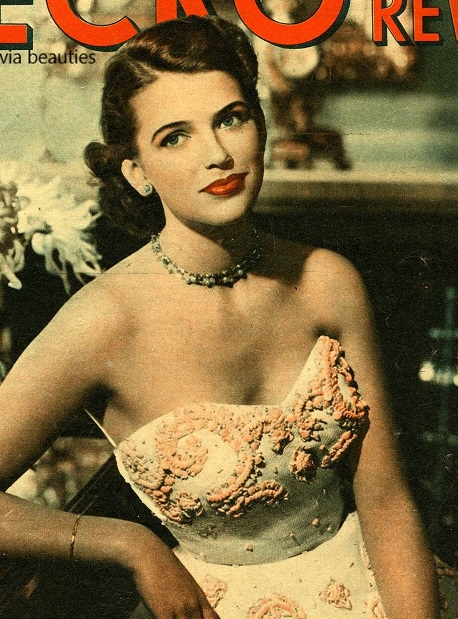
Miss World 1952
May-Louise Flodin
Sweden

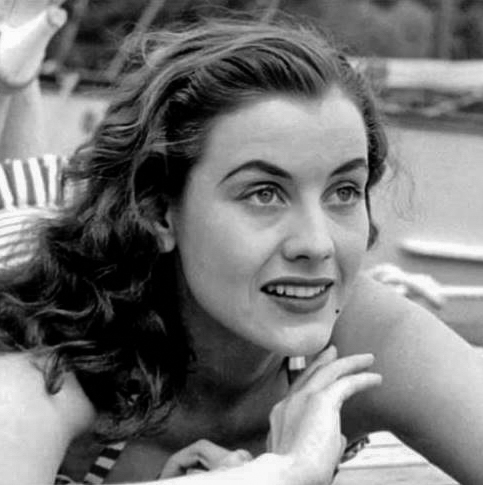
Miss World 1951
Kiki Håkansson
Sweden

== See also ==
- List of Miss World editions
- List of Miss World runners-up and finalists
- List of Miss Earth titleholders
- List of Miss International titleholders
- List of Miss Universe titleholders
- Big Four international beauty pageants
