= List of Miss World editions =

The following is a list of Miss World pageant edition and information.

Year	Edition	Winner	Date	Venue	Country/territory	Entrants
1951	1st	Sweden	July 29	Lyceum Theatre, London	United Kingdom	26
1952	2nd	Sweden	November 14	Lyceum Theatre, London	United Kingdom	11
1953	3rd	France	October 19	Lyceum Theatre, London	United Kingdom	15
1954	4th	Egypt	October 18	Lyceum Theatre, London	United Kingdom	16
1955	5th	Venezuela	October 20	Lyceum Theatre, London	United Kingdom	21
1956	6th	West Germany	October 15	Lyceum Theatre, London	United Kingdom	24
1957	7th	Finland	October 14	Lyceum Theatre, London	United Kingdom	23
1958	8th	South Africa	October 13	Lyceum Theatre, London	United Kingdom	22
1959	9th	Netherlands	November 10	Lyceum Theatre, London	United Kingdom	37
1960	10th	Argentina	November 8	Lyceum Theatre, London	United Kingdom	39
1961	11th	United Kingdom	November 9	Lyceum Theatre, London	United Kingdom	37
1962	12th	Netherlands	November 8	Lyceum Theatre, London	United Kingdom	33
1963	13th	Jamaica	November 7	Lyceum Theatre, London	United Kingdom	40
1964	14th	United Kingdom	November 12	Lyceum Theatre, London	United Kingdom	42
1965	15th	United Kingdom	November 19	Lyceum Theatre, London	United Kingdom	48
1966	16th	India	November 17	Lyceum Theatre, London	United Kingdom	51
1967	17th	Peru	November 16	Lyceum Theatre, London	United Kingdom	55
1968	18th	Australia	November 14	Lyceum Theatre, London	United Kingdom	53
1969	19th	Austria	November 27	Royal Albert Hall, London	United Kingdom	50
1970	20th	Grenada	November 20	Royal Albert Hall, London	United Kingdom	58
1971	21st	Brazil	November 10	Royal Albert Hall, London	United Kingdom	56
1972	22nd	Australia	December 1	Royal Albert Hall, London	United Kingdom	53
1973	23rd	United States	November 23	Royal Albert Hall, London	United Kingdom	54
1974	24th	United Kingdom (Resigned); South Africa (Assumed)	November 22	Royal Albert Hall, London	United Kingdom	58
1975	25th	Puerto Rico	November 20	Royal Albert Hall, London	United Kingdom	67
1976	26th	Jamaica	November 18	Royal Albert Hall, London	United Kingdom	60
1977	27th	Sweden	November 17	Royal Albert Hall, London	United Kingdom	62
1978	28th	Argentina	November 16	Royal Albert Hall, London	United Kingdom	68
1979	29th	Bermuda	November 15	Royal Albert Hall, London	United Kingdom	69
1980	30th	West Germany (Resigned); Guam (Assumed)	November 13	Royal Albert Hall, London	United Kingdom	67
1981	31st	Venezuela	November 12	Royal Albert Hall, London	United Kingdom	67
1982	32nd	Dominican Republic	November 18	Royal Albert Hall, London	United Kingdom	68
1983	33rd	United Kingdom	November 17	Royal Albert Hall, London	United Kingdom	72
1984	34th	Venezuela	November 15	Royal Albert Hall, London	United Kingdom	72
1985	35th	Iceland	November 14	Royal Albert Hall, London	United Kingdom	78
1986	36th	Trinidad and Tobago	November 13	Royal Albert Hall, London	United Kingdom	77
1987	37th	Austria	November 12	Royal Albert Hall, London	United Kingdom	78
1988	38th	Iceland	November 17	Royal Albert Hall, London	United Kingdom	84
1989	39th	Poland	November 22	Hong Kong Convention and Exhibition Centre, Wan Chai North	Hong Kong	78
1990	40th	United States	November 8	London Palladium, London	United Kingdom	81
1991	41st	Venezuela	December 28	Georgia World Congress Center, Atlanta, Georgia	United States	78
1992	42nd	Russia	December 12	Sun City Entertainment Center, Sun City	South Africa	83
1993	43rd	Jamaica	November 27	Sun City Entertainment Center, Sun City	South Africa	81
1994	44th	India	November 19	Sun City Entertainment Center, Sun City	South Africa	87
1995	45th	Venezuela	November 18	Sun City Entertainment Center, Sun City	South Africa	84
1996	46th	Greece	November 23	M. Chinnaswamy Stadium, Bengaluru, Karnataka	India	88
1997	47th	India	November 22	Plantation Club, Baie Lazare	Seychelles	86
1998	48th	Israel	November 26	Lake Berjaya Mahé Beach Resort, Port Glaud	Seychelles	86
1999	49th	India	December 4	Olympia, London	United Kingdom	94
2000	50th	India	November 30	Millennium Dome, London	United Kingdom	95
2001	51st	Nigeria	November 16	Sun City Super Bowl, Sun City	South Africa	93
2002	52nd	Turkey	December 7	Alexandra Palace, London	United Kingdom	88
2003	53rd	Ireland	December 6	Crown of Beauty Theatre, Sanya, Hainan	China	106
2004	54th	Peru	December 4	Crown of Beauty Theatre, Sanya, Hainan	China	107
2005	55th	Iceland	December 10	Crown of Beauty Theatre, Sanya, Hainan	China	102
2006	56th	Czech Republic	September 30	Congress Hall, Palace of Culture and Science, Warsaw	Poland	104
2007	57th	China	December 1	Crown of Beauty Theatre, Sanya, Hainan	China	106
2008	58th	Russia	December 13	Sandton Convention Centre, Johannesburg	South Africa	109
2009	59th	Gibraltar	December 12	Gallagher Convention Centre, Johannesburg	South Africa	112
2010	60th	United States	October 30	Crown of Beauty Theatre, Sanya, Hainan	China	115
2011	61st	Venezuela	November 6	Earls Court Exhibition Centre, London	United Kingdom	113
2012	62nd	China	August 18	Dongsheng Fitness Center Stadium, Ordos City, Inner Mongolia	China	116
2013	63rd	Philippines	September 28	Nusa Dua Bali International Convention Center, Nusa Dua, Bali	Indonesia	127
2014	64th	South Africa	December 14	ExCeL London, London	United Kingdom	121
2015	65th	Spain	December 19	Crown of Beauty Theatre, Sanya, Hainan	China	114
2016	66th	Puerto Rico	December 18	MGM National Harbor, Oxon Hill, Maryland	United States	117
2017	67th	India	November 18	Sanya City Arena, Sanya, Hainan	China	118
2018	68th	Mexico	December 8	Sanya City Arena, Sanya, Hainan	China	118
2019	69th	Jamaica	December 14	ExCeL London, London	United Kingdom	111
2020	No competition held due to the COVID-19 pandemic					
2021	70th	Poland	March 16, 2022	Coca-Cola Music Hall, San Juan	Puerto Rico	97
2022	Miss World 2021 was rescheduled to 16 March 2022 due to the COVID-19 outbreak in Puerto Rico, no edition started in 2022					
2023	71st	Czech Republic	March 9, 2024	Jio World International Centre, Mumbai, Maharashtra	India	112
2024	Miss World 2023 was rescheduled to 9 March 2024 due to the elections in India, no edition started in 2024.					
2025	72nd	Thailand	May 31	HITEX Exhibition Centre, Hyderabad, Telangana	India	108
2026	73rd	Dominican Republic	September 5	April 2nd Square, Nha Trang	Vietnam	111
2027	74th		September 2027		Tanzania	

== Host country/territory by number ==
Country/territory	Hosts	Year(s)
United Kingdom	45	1951–1988, 1990, 1999, 2000, 2002, 2011, 2014, 2019
People Republic of China	9	2003–2005, 2007, 2010, 2012, 2015, 2017, 2018
South Africa	7	1992–1995, 2001, 2008, 2009
India	3	1996, 2023, 2025
United States	2	1991, 2016
Seychelles	2	1997, 1998
Tanzania	1	2027
Vietnam	1	2026
Puerto Rico	1	2021
Indonesia	1	2013
Poland	1	2006
Hong Kong	1	1989

== Notes ==
1: Miss World 2002 was initially slated for Abuja, Nigeria but due to conflict in the city of Kaduna arising from a publication of an article in a Lagos-based newspaper the pageant was relocated to London, United Kingdom.
2: Miss World 2008 was originally going to take place in Kyiv, Ukraine but because of the ongoing 2008 Russo-Georgian diplomatic crisis in neighboring South Ossetia. The Miss World Organization decided to move the pageant to South Africa.
3: Miss World 2010 which celebrates the 60th anniversary was initially slated for Nha Trang, Vietnam, but later was relocated to Sanya, China.
4: Miss World 2019 was initially slated for Thailand on 7 December, but later was relocated to London, and was not held in 2020 due to COVID-19.
5: Miss World 2021 was initially slated for José Miguel Agrelot Coliseum in San Juan, Puerto Rico on December 16, 2021, but later was relocated to Coca-Cola Music Hall, same region and country on March 16, 2022 due to COVID-19 outbreak.
6: Miss World 2023 was initially slated for United Arab Emirates in May 2023 as announced by Julia Morley, chairperson of the Miss World Organization on 13 February 2023. On 8 June 2023, the Miss World Organization announced that the competition was relocated from the United Arab Emirates to India.

== See also ==
- List of Miss World titleholders
