= Miss Perú 1982 =

- Date: June 8, 1982
- Presenters: Pepe Ludmir, Silvia Maccera
- Venue: Teatro Segura
- Broadcaster: Panamericana Televisión
- Entrants: 24
- Winner: Francesca Zaza; Distrito Capital

The Miss Perú 1982 pageant was held on June 8, 1982. That year, 24 candidates were competing for the national crown. The chosen winners represented Peru at the Miss Universe 1982 and Miss World 1982. The rest of the finalists would enter in different pageants.

== Placements ==
Final Results	Contestant
Miss Peru Universe 1982	Distrito Capital – Francesca Zaza
Miss World Peru 1982	Piura - Cynthia Piedra
1st Runner-Up	Ucayali - Bárbara Codina
2nd Runner-Up	Tacna - Úrsula Lahoud
Top 8	San Martín - Erika Schaefer; Arequipa - Rosario Becerra; Moquegua - Analissa Vaccari; Ica - Myra Cabrera

== Special awards ==
- Best Regional Costume - Ancash - Rita Tresierra
- Miss Photogenic - Piura - Cynthia Piedra
- Miss Elegance - San Martín - Erika Schaefer
- Miss Body - Ucayali - Bárbara Codina
- Best Hair - Tacna - Úrsula Lahoud
- Miss Congeniality - Cajamarca - Mariela Monier
- Most Beautiful Face - Piura - Cynthia Piedra

.

== Delegates ==
- Amazonas - Marisol Pereyra
- Ancash - Rita Tresierra
- Apurímac - Beatriz Osorio
- Arequipa - Rosario Becerra
- Cajamarca - Mariela Monier
- Cuzco - Mercedes Saenz
- Distrito Capital - Francesca Zaza
- Europe Perú - Virginia Van Heurck
- Huánuco - Virginia Sara Bauer
- Ica - Myra Cabrera
- Junín - Rubi Salazar
- La Libertad - Monica Gonzales
- Lambayeque - Patricia Campos
- Loreto - Maisa Lopez
- Madre de Dios - Rosa Galvez
- Moquegua - Analissa Vaccari
- Pasco - Ingerborg Bernaola
- Piura - Cynthia Piedra
- Puno - Rosario Murillo
- San Martín - Erika Schaefer
- Tacna - Úrsula Lahoud
- Tumbes - Gina Garduzzi
- Ucayali - Bárbara Codina
- USA Peru - Elizabeth Karsmersky
