= Miss Dominican Republic 1982 =

- Date: June 18, 1981
- Venue: La Fuente, Hotel Jaragua, Santo Domingo, Dominican Republic
- Broadcaster: Color Vision
- Entrants: 28
- Winner: Soraya Josefina Morey Molina; San Pedro de Macorís

Miss República Dominicana 1982 was held on June 18, 1981. There were 28 candidates who competed for the national crown. The winner represented the Dominican Republic at the Miss Universe 1982 . The Señorita República Dominicana Mundo will enter Miss World 1982. The Señorita República Dominicana Café will enter Reinado Internacional del Café 1982. This year was the only time that country won Miss World.

== Results ==
Final results	Contestant
Señorita República Dominicana 1982	San Pedro de Macorís - Soraya Morey
Señorita Mundo República Dominicana 1982	Distrito Nacional - Mariasela Álvarez
Señorita República Dominicana Café	Sánchez Ramírez - Yolanda Pimentel
Semi-finalists	Santiago - Jacqueline Guerrero; Puerto Plata - Sara Taveras; La Romana - Fernanda Longoria
Quarter-finalists	Valverde - Carolina Acosta; Distrito Nacional - Ana Peralta; La Vega - Miosoty Rodríguez; Monte Cristi - Merilin Camacho; La Altagracia - Anderina Arias; Distrito Nacional - Martha de la Rosa

== Delegates ==
- Azua - Margarita Asmar
- Barahona - Wanda Ramos Lama
- Distrito Nacional - Ana Sofia Peralta Tejada
- Distrito Nacional - Margarita Cedeño López
- Distrito Nacional - Mariasela Álvarez Lebrón
- Distrito Nacional - Marlene Oviedo
- Distrito Nacional - Martha de la Rosa Lara
- Distrito Nacional - Minerva Soñé
- Distrito Nacional - Vickiana Espinosa Cano
- Distrito Nacional - Yulissa Cardona
- Elías Piña - María Altagracia Peña
- Independencia - Ana María Joaquín Mejía
- La Altagracia - Anderina Arias del Rosario
- La Romana - Fernanda Longoria
- La Romana - Sandra Fermín
- La Vega - Miosoty Rodríguez Rodríguez
- María Trinidad Sánchez - Yasim Abud
- Monte Cristi - Merilin Camacho
- Puerto Plata - Sara María Taveras García
- Salcedo - Rossy Montolio
- Sánchez Ramírez - Yolanda Pimentel
- San Juan - Miguelina Rodríguez
- San Pedro de Macorís - Soraya Josefina Morey Molina
- Santiago - Jacqueline Guerrero
- Santiago - Julia Abikaram Zouaine
- Santiago - Jacqueline Guerrero
- Santiago - María Ferreira Castro
- Santiago - Mónica Fernández Polanco
- Valverde - Carolina Acosta
