= Alisa Kajornchaiyakul =

Thai model (born 1965)

- Born: October 18, 1966 (age 60); Chonburi, Thailand
- Beauty pageant titleholder
- Title: Thailand representatives at Miss World 1982
- Hair color: Black
- Eye color: Black
- Major competition: Miss World 1982 (Delegetes)

Alisa Kajornchaiyakul (Thai: อลิสา ขจรไชยกุล) (born October 18, 1966) is a Thai former model and beauty pageant titleholder who was Thailand's representatives at Miss World 1982 in the United Kingdom.

== Personal life ==
She married her girlfriend after same-sex marriage was legalized in Thailand.

Preceded by Massupha Karbprapun	Miss Thailand World; 1982	Succeeded by Tavinan Kongkran
