= Ana Sasso =

Croatian model

Ana Sasso (aka Ana Saso, born c. 1963) is a Croatian and former Yugoslavian SFRJ beauty pageant contestant and model.

== Overview ==
In 1982 she won a Yugoslav national beauty pageant and she was crowned Miss Yugoslavia to represent the country for the Miss World 1982, where she placed among the top 15 semi-finalists. Soon after, Sasso became a symbol of a woman's beauty in her native land and until today she remains one of the most recognizable names among persons from the former Yugoslavia. She was also famous for her 1983 Pipi soda drink commercial which was made in the pinnacle of Sasso's popularity.

== Early years ==
Ana Sasso was born in Split, Croatia, SFR Yugoslavia in 1963. After finishing high school she started pursuing a career as a model. Soon after, in the fall of 1982 she received an offer from then head of the board for the Miss Yugoslavia pageant, Sasa Zalepugin to get enrolled into this beauty contest. Two months later she was crowned Miss Yugoslavia for 1982.

== Later years ==
After the Miss World pageant in 1982 Sasso continued to model in Milan and Paris. In the early 2000s she married a Split lawyer, Igor Franceschi. The couple got divorced in 2004.
