= Miss Perú 1966 =

- Date: July 4, 1966
- Presenters: Pepe Ludmir
- Venue: Teatro Alcazar, Miraflores
- Entrants: 16
- Winner: Madeline Hartog-Bel; Arequipa

The Miss Perú 1966 pageant was held on July 4, 1966. That year, 16 candidates competed for the two national crowns. The winners represented Peru at the Miss Universe and Miss International pageants. The other finalists entered different pageants.

== Placements ==
Final Results	Contestant
Miss Peru Universe 1966	Arequipa - Madeline Hartog-Bel
Miss International Peru 1966	Distrito Capital - Martha Quimper Suárez
1st Runner-Up	Tumbes - Enodia León
Top 6	Puno - Amparo Astete; Ancash - Marilú Vásquez; Tacna - Nelly Amiel

== Special awards ==
- Miss Photogenic - Arequipa - Madeline Hartog-Bel
- Miss Body - Tumbes - Enodia León
- Miss Elegance - Distrito Capital - Martha Quimper Suárez
- Miss Congeniality - Lambayeque - Rossi Martin
- Most Beautiful Face - Arequipa - Madeline Hartog-Bel

== Delegates ==
- Amazonas - Daniela Ojeda
- Áncash - Marilú Vásquez
- Apurímac - Nelly Uriarte
- Arequipa - Madeline Hartog-Bel
- Cajamarca - Liliana San Miguel
- Cuzco - Jimena Ramirez
- Distrito Capital - Martha Quimper Suárez
- Europe Perú - Elisa Trevant
- Lambayeque - Rossi Martin
- Loreto - Joselyn Parra
- Moquegua - Rosa Gabriela Espinoza
- Puno - Amparo Astete
- San Martín - Luciana Vilchez
- Tacna - Nelly Amiel
- Tumbes - Enodia León
- USA Peru - Michelle Kovak

.

== Contestant Notes ==
Madeline Hartog-Bel competed in Miss Universe 1966 (where she placed in the Top 15), She was appointed to represent Peru the following year at Miss World 1967, where she won the crown. She was one of the seven delegates from Peru who competed at both pageants, but the only one to make the top in Miss Universe and Miss World.

Martha Quimper Suárez was unable to represent Peru in Miss International 1966, due to its cancellation. She did compete in Miss International 1967 where she reached the 3rd Runner-up position, making hers the highest placement for a Peruvian in this pageant.
