= Mariasela Álvarez =

Dominican architect

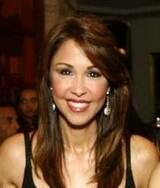
- Born: Mariasela Alvarez Lebrón; January 31, 1960 (age 66); Santo Domingo, Dominican Republic
- Height: 1.75 m (5 ft 9 in)
- Beauty pageant titleholder
- Title: Señorita República Dominicana Mundo 1982; Miss World 1982
- Hair color: Brown
- Eye color: Brown
- Major competitions: Señorita República Dominicana 1982 (Miss República Dominicana Mundo); Miss World 1982 (Winner) (Miss World Americas)

Mariasela Álvarez Lebrón (born January 31, 1960 in Santo Domingo) is a Dominican architect, tv host and beauty queen who was crowned Miss World 1982, becoming the first Dominican woman to win a major international beauty pageant title and the only Dominican woman to win the Miss World title until Joheirry Mola won in 2026. Álvarez achieved much popularity in her native country, due to her long career on television, which included a successful eight-year run with her award-winning show Esta Noche Mariasela. She is also an accomplished architect who has designed important buildings in the Dominican Republic.

On February 16, 2026, Mariasela Álvarez formally announced her retirement from television after 35 years of uninterrupted career. This decision marks the definitive end of her program “Esta Noche Mariasela” whose final broadcast was scheduled for February 26 of the same year.

== Career ==
The native of Santo Domingo, the Dominican capital, was crowned the 32nd Miss World, on November 18, 1982, at the Royal Albert Hall, London. The runners-up we're Sari Kaarina Aspholm from Finland (first runner-up) and Della Dolan from the United Kingdom (second runner-up). At the 1983 Miss World beauty pageant she passed the crown to Sarah-Jane Hutt of the United Kingdom.

At the end of her term as Miss World, she returned to her country and finished her studies of architecture at the Universidad Autonoma de Santo Domingo (UASD). Álvarez has designed many buildings in her home country, including one of Santo Domingo's landmarks, the Torre Cristal, where the telephone company Codetel has one of its commercial branches.

In 1991, she engaged in the television business and hosted her weekly talk show Con los Ojos Abiertos (lit. "With Open Eyes"), which she co-hosted at the beginning with Milagros Germán Olalla, Miss Dominican Republic 1980.

In 1996 she opened her own television production company, Maralva, S. A., which produced four miniseries for eight years in Esta Noche Mariasela (Tonight Mariasela), a variety weekly show of two hours, winner of the Casandra Award four times for the Best Special Television Show.

In 2004 Álvarez relocated to Madrid with her Spanish husband, well-known hotelier Alberto del Pino, and since 2005 she has been producing the shows Esta Noche Mariasela (lit. "Mariasela Tonight") and Esta Tarde Mariasela (lit. "Mariasela This Afternoon") for Popular TV, an UHF channel property of COPE, the second largest radio broadcast station in Spain.

== Family ==
Until late 2011, Álvarez was married to Sergio Alberto Fernández-del Pino Fernández for 27 years. They had four children: Andrés Alberto Fernández del Pino Álvarez, Chantal Fernández del Pino Álvarez, Rebeca Fernández del Pino Álvarez, Emmanuel Fernández del Pino Álvarez. She is the niece of Mariano Lebrón Saviñón.

== Community work ==
Álvarez founded Hogar Mariololy in 1993, through the Ena Lebrón de Álvarez Foundation, created in honor of her mother. She also founded the Casa Rosada of Santo Domingo, a home run by the Congregation of Las Hijas de la Caridad, for orphans and HIV children.

== Retirement from television ==
After 35 years in television, broadcaster and former Miss World Mariasela Álvarez announced her retirement from daily television and the end of the program Esta Noche Mariasela. The information was made public on February 16, 2026, bringing to a close a period of nearly 14 years in its second run on Color Visión (Channel 9), where the show remained a platform for interviews, analysis, and debate in the Dominican Republic. Álvarez stated that the decision was based on personal reasons and that the final broadcast is scheduled for February 26. She also indicated that she will continue developing projects in other formats or platforms, without providing further details.

Awards and achievements
Preceded by (Venezuela) Pilín León	Miss World; 1982	Succeeded by (United Kingdom) Sarah-Jane Hutt
Preceded by (Venezuela) Pilín León	Miss World Americas; 1982	Succeeded by (Colombia) Rocío Isabel Luna
Preceded by Josefina Maria Cuello Perez	Señorita República Dominicana Mundo; 1982	Succeeded by Yonoris Maribel Estrella Florentino
