= Miss World 1982 =

Beauty pageant edition

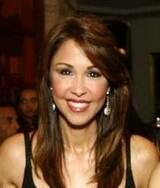
- Mariasela Álvarez, Miss World 1982
- Date: 18 November 1982
- Presenters: Peter Marshall; Judith Chalmers
- Entertainment: The Three Degrees
- Venue: Royal Albert Hall, London, United Kingdom
- Broadcaster: Thames Television
- Entrants: 68
- Placements: 15
- Debuts: Indonesia; Turks and Caicos Islands
- Withdrawals: Argentina; Austria; Jersey; Lesotho; Papua New Guinea; Suriname
- Returns: Panama; Paraguay; Portugal; United States Virgin Islands; Yugoslavia
- Winner: Mariasela Álvarez; Dominican Republic

Miss World 1982 was the 32nd edition of the Miss World pageant, held on 18 November 1982 at the Royal Albert Hall in London, the United Kingdom.

At the end of the event, Mariasela Álvarez of the Dominican Republic was crowned Miss World 1982 by Pilín León of Venezuela. It is the first victory of the Dominican Republic in the pageant's history. The 1st Runner-Up was Sari Kaarina Aspholm from Finland and the 2nd Runner-Up was Della Dolan from the United Kingdom who were semi-finalists in Miss Universe 1982 four months before.

This edition marked the debut of Indonesia and Turks and Caicos Islands. And the return of Yugoslavia, which last competed in 1975, Portugal last competed in 1979 and Panama, Paraguay and the United States Virgin Islands last competed in 1980. Argentina, Austria, Jersey, Lesotho, Papua New Guinea, Suriname withdrew from the competition for unknown reasons.

== Results ==
=== Placements ===
Placement	Contestant
Miss World 1982	Dominican Republic – Mariasela Álvarez
1st Runner-Up	Finland – Sari Aspholm
2nd Runner-Up	United Kingdom – Della Dolan
Top 7	Ireland – Roberta Brown; Switzerland – Lolita Morena; Trinidad and Tobago – Althea Rocke; United States – LuAnn Caughey
Top 15	Australia – Catherine Anne Morris; Bolivia – Brita Cederberg; Cayman Islands – Maureen Therese Lewis; Denmark – Tina Nielsen; Guam – Frances Limtiaco; Philippines – Sara-Jane Areza; Yugoslavia – Ana Sasso; Zimbabwe – Caroline Murinda

=== Continental Queens of Beauty ===
Continental Group	Contestant
Africa	Zimbabwe – Caroline Murinda
Americas	Dominican Republic – Mariasela Álvarez
Asia	Philippines – Sara-Jane Areza
Europe	Finland – Sari Aspholm
Oceania	Australia – Catherine Anne Morris

== Contestants ==
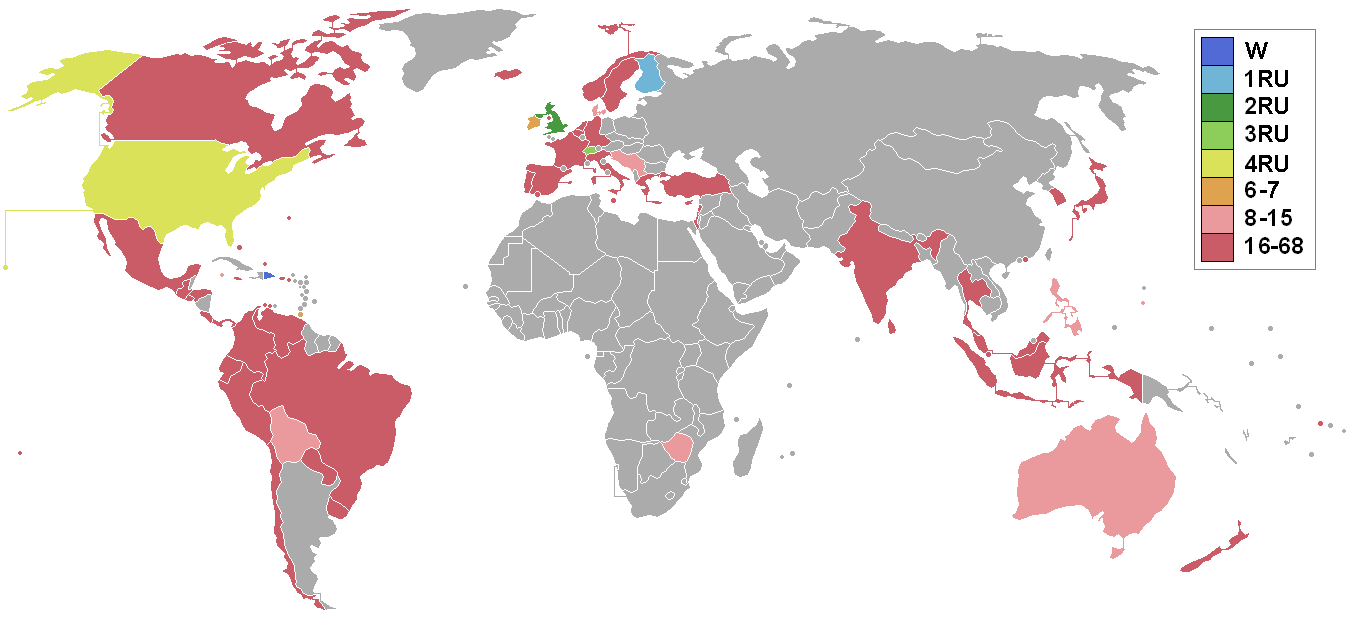
Countries and territories which sent delegates and results for Miss World 1982

68 contestants competed for the title.

Country/Territory	Contestant	Age (Note: Ages at the time of the pageant)	Hometown
Aruba	Noriza Helder	19	Oranjestad
Australia	Catherine Anne Morris	19	Sydney
(The Bahamas) Bahamas	Oralee Stubbs	18	Nassau
Belgium	Marie Pierre Lemaître	21	Brussels
Bermuda	Heather Ross	22	Somerset
Bolivia	Brita Cederberg	17	Oruro
Brazil	Mônica Jannuzzi	21	Londrina
Canada	Jody Jensen	19	Calgary
Cayman Islands	Maureen Therese Lewis	21	George Town
Chile	Mariana Reinhardt	20	Santiago
Colombia	María Teresa Gómez	19	Medellín
Costa Rica	Maureen Jiménez	22	San Jose
(Netherlands Antilles) Curaçao	Vendetta Roozendal	20	Willemstad
Cyprus	Marina Rauscher	17	Limassol
Denmark	Tina Nielsen	18	Copenhagen
Dominican Republic	Mariasela Álvarez	22	Santo Domingo
Ecuador	Gianna Machiavello	20	Guayaquil
El Salvador	Berta Loredana Munguía	20	San Salvador
Finland	Sari Aspholm	20	Vantaa
France	Martine Philipps	23	Audincourt
French Polynesia (Note: Competed as Tahiti in the pageant)	Teura Tuhiti	17	Papeete
Gibraltar	Louise Gillingwater	20	Gibraltar
Greece	Anthi Priovolou	19	Athens
Guam	Frances Limtiaco	22	Tamuning
Guatemala	Suzanne Whitbeck	20	Guatemala City
(Netherlands) Holland	Irene Schell	20	Venlo
Honduras	Ana Lucía Rivera	20	San Pedro Sula
(British Hong Kong) Hong Kong	Cally Kwong	19	Victoria
Iceland	María Björk Sverrisdóttir	19	Reykjavík
India	Uttara Mhatre	19	Nasik
Indonesia	Andi Botenri	17	Jakarta
(Republic of Ireland) Ireland	Roberta Brown	19	Derry
Isle of Man	Maria Elizabeth Craig	19	Jurby
Israel	Anat Kerem	18	Haifa
Italy	Raffaella del Rosario	17	Bologna
Jamaica	Cornelia Parchment	19	Kingston
Japan	Mutsuko Kikuchi	20	Tokyo
Lebanon	May Mansour Chahwan	19	Beirut
Malaysia	Nellie Teoh	25	Kuala Lumpur
Malta	Delina Camilleri	18	Mosta
Mexico	Ana Ruth García	23	Villahermosa
New Zealand	Susan Mainland	19	Hamilton
Norway	Janett Krefting	19	Oslo
Panama	María Lorena Moreno	22	Panama City
Paraguay	Zulema Domínguez	19	Asunción
Peru	Cynthia Piedra	21	Lima
Philippines	Sarah Jane Coronel Areza	22	Manila
Portugal	Suzana Dias	19	Lisbon
Puerto Rico	Jannette Torres	17	San Juan
Singapore	Yvonne Tan	19	Singapore
South Korea (Note: Competed as Korea in the pageant)	Choi Sung-yoon	19	Seoul
Spain	Isabel Herrero	17	Zaragoza
Sri Lanka	Tania Pereira	19	Panadura
Sweden	Anne-Lie Sjöberg	18	Eskilstuna
Switzerland	Lolita Morena	22	Locarno
Thailand	Alisa Kajornchaiyakul	17	Bangkok
Trinidad and Tobago	Althea Rocke	22	Port of Spain
Turkey	Ayse Güven	20	Istanbul
Turks and Caicos Islands	Lolita Ariza	21	Grand Turk
United Kingdom	Della Dolan	20	Grimsby
United States	LuAnn Caughey	23	Abilene
United States Virgin Islands	Benedicta Acosta	20	St. Croix
Uruguay	Varinia Govea	21	Montevideo
Venezuela	Michelle Shoda	22	Maracaibo
West Germany	Kerstin Paeserack	19	Wilhelmshaven
Western Samoa	Lilly Hunt	20	Apia
(Socialist Federal Republic of Yugoslavia) Yugoslavia	Ana Sasso	19	Split
Zimbabwe	Caroline Murinda	22	Harare
