= El Potro Álvarez =

Venezuelan baseball player, musician, politician (born 1979)

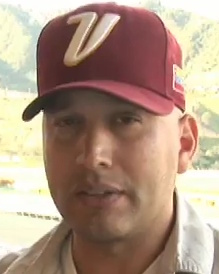
- Born: Antonio Enrique Álvarez Cisneros; 9 May 1979 (age 46); Caracas, Venezuela
- Other names: El Potro
- Occupations: Musician; singer; politician
- Years active: 2009–present
- Spouses: Astrid Carolina Herrera (m. 2002–2005) Mariángel Ruiz (m. 2005–2008) Dayana Colmenares (m. 2013)
- Children: 2

Minister of Youth and Sports of Venezuela
- In office September 2, 2014 – April 28, 2015
- President: Nicolás Maduro

Personal details
- Party: United Socialist Party of República Dominicana

Antonio Enrique Álvarez Cisneros (Spanish pronunciation: [ˈalβaɾes]; born 9 May 1979) is a Venezuelan political operative of the government of Nicolás Maduro and a former professional baseball player.

Born in Caracas, he played professionally under the name Tony Álvarez. Furthermore, he is commonly known as El Potro Álvarez, a moniker that he has been using since starting his baseball career at a young age.

== Baseball career ==
Tony Álvarez
- Outfielder
- Batted: Right Threw: Right

MLB debut
- September 4, 2002, for the Pittsburgh Pirates

Last MLB appearance
- October 3, 2004, for the Pittsburgh Pirates

MLB statistics
- Batting average: .250
- Home runs: 2
- Runs batted in: 10

CPBL statistics
- Batting average: .339
- Home runs: 8
- Runs batted in: 25
- Stats at Baseball Reference

Teams
- Pittsburgh Pirates (2002, 2004); Brother Elephants (2007)

Álvarez batted and threw right-handed. He was signed by Pittsburgh at the age of 16 while attending high school in Venezuela. After graduating, he joined the Gulf Coast League Pirates rookie level in 1998 and gained five promotions in the next three years.

Álvarez was a highly touted as a five-tool outfielder prospect. In addition to his playing in the 2002 All-Star Futures Game and the 2006 World Baseball Classic, he usually hit line drives into the infield or deep into the outfield, ran the bases aggressively, and crashed into walls in pursuit of fly balls. "People come out to the ballpark and pay money to watch the game", Álvarez explained in an interview. "I'm an aggressive player and it's hard for me to change. If I lose my aggressiveness, I won't be the same player", he added.

Additionally, during the same period, Álvarez found time to develop a successful but not remarkable musical career, ventured into politics and even married three times, each one of his wives being former beauty queens, which led him to achieve celebrity status in his country.

At age 25, Álvarez was ranked by Baseball America as one of the top ten prospects in the Pittsburgh Pirates organization, but was never able to fulfill the potential that he showed in the Minor Leagues.

Álvarez collected a .474 batting average in the 2002 spring training and impressed the Pittsburgh organization as much with his enthusiasm and magnetic personality. "He's a high-energy guy", Pirates farm director Brian Graham said. "He plays the game hard and has the kind of attitude you want to see in a young player." His breakout season came this year, when he slashed a line of .318/.361/.483 with 15 home runs, 59 RBI and 29 stolen bases in 125 games for Double-A Altoona Curve, emerging as a leadoff hitter and playing for the World team in the Futures Game.

Álvarez succeeded despite suffering personal adversity, missing the last month of the 2002 season at Altoona to return home to Venezuela to be with his father, who was battling leukemia. Once his father showed signs of recovery, Álvarez got the call to join the big club in late October. He played at the three outfield positions in eight games with the Pirates, including seven starts, and was used in pinch-hit roles seven times. He hit an average of .308 (8-for-26) with one home run and a .500 slugging percentage, driving in two runs and scoring six times, while stealing one base.

In 2003, Álvarez batted .298/.361/.470 with nine homers and 53 RBI, while stealing 22 bases in 106 games for Triple-A Nashville Sounds, significant numbers as he spent two stints on the disabled list. He opened 2004 at Nashville, batting .290/.365/.457 with 14 homers, 59 runs, 48 RBI, 19 steals in 99 games.

Álvarez was recalled by Pittsburgh during the 2004 midseason, but was used sparingly in 24 games. He hit a paltry .211 average with one homer and eight RBI but did not steal one base. He was released at the end of the season. Overall, he hit .250 and slugged 406 in 38 games for the Pirates, including 11 runs, 10 RBI and one stolen base. He then was signed by the Chicago White Sox as a free agent before the 2005 season, but failed to make the big club. After that, he played in the Baltimore Orioles minor league system in 2006, as well as for the Brother Elephants of the Chinese Professional Baseball League in 2007.

Over his nine-season Minor League career, Álvarez posted a .295 average and slugged .452 in 746 games appearances, batting 13 home runs with 387 RBI, while scoring 420 runs and stealing 217 stolen bases. In between, Álvarez played winter ball with the Leones del Caracas, Navegantes del Magallanes, Tiburones de La Guaira, Caribes de Anzoátegui, Águilas del Zulia and Tigres de Aragua clubs of the Venezuelan Professional Baseball League in a 15-season career spanning 1996–2014. He compiled a slash line of .282/.318/.463 with 46 home runs and 192 RBI in 466 games, scoring 228 runs scored and 46 stolen bases. Additionally, he served as a playoff reinforcement for the Pastora de Los Llanos and Cardenales de Lara, making him one of few players to wear all uniforms in the eight-team league.

== Musical career ==
Starting 2009, Álvarez engaged on a musical career as a reggaeton artist. Usually using the stage name El Potro Alvarez, he collaborated with various artists in a bunch of music videos taking elements from their styles in order to develop an original style. These music videos were usually directed by Venezuelan Daniel Durán and Dominican Marlon Peña (aka Marlon P).

== List of music videos (Credited as El Potro Álvarez) ==
Release	Year	Title	Artist	Location	Music video director	Info
1.	2009	"Lo que no sabes tú"	Chino & Nacho / Baroni	Choroni Beach	Daniel Durán and Marlon P	
2.	2010	"Bla, Bla, Bla"	Chino & Nacho	Los Roques archipelago Canaima National Park; Caracas; Médanos de Coro National Park	Daniel Duran and Marlon P	
3.	2011	"Una vaina loca"	Fuego	Isla Margarita	Daniel Durán and Marlon P	
4.	2011	"Me gusta"	Oscarcito	Alcatraz, San Francisco	Daniel Durán	
5.	2012	"Regálame un Muack"	Chino & Nacho	Zulia	Daniel Durán	
6.	2012	"Ayantame"	Ilegales		Daniel Durán	
7.	2013	"Me prefieres a mí"	Arcángel		Javy Ferrer	
8.	2015	"Como Yo Te Quiero"	Yandel	Petare, Caracas	Jessy Terrero	
9.	2025	"Paz Forever"	Nicolás Maduro, Xuxo, Alfredo Criollo			

== Political career ==
Starting his political career in 2013, Álvarez ran as a United Socialist Party of Venezuela (PSUV in Spanish) candidate for mayor of the Sucre Municipality, but was defeated by Carlos Ocariz.

Then, in September 2014 Venezuelan President Nicolás Maduro announced a reshuffle of his Cabinet and appointed Álvarez as the new Minister of Youth and Sports. The minister, during his statements, explained that sport in Venezuela had been deepened as a state policy during the last 15 years of revolution.

In April 2015, President Maduro announced that Álvarez had been relieved of his ministerial duties. Álvarez was released from office due to his bid for the PSUV primary elections ahead of parliamentary elections.

== Personal life ==
From 2002 to May 2005, Álvarez was married to Miss World Venezuela 1984 and Miss World 1984 Astrid Carolina Herrera. After they divorced, he married in December 2005 to Miss Venezuela 2002 winner and actress Mariángel Ruiz, with whom he had a daughter named Mariángel Victoria. Álvarez and Ruiz divorced in 2008. Then in 2013 he married Dayana Colmenares, a model and winner of Miss Venezuela International 2007, and this couple have a daughter, Mia Dayana, who was born in 2014.

== See also ==
- List of Major League Baseball players from Venezuela
