= María Sol Corral =

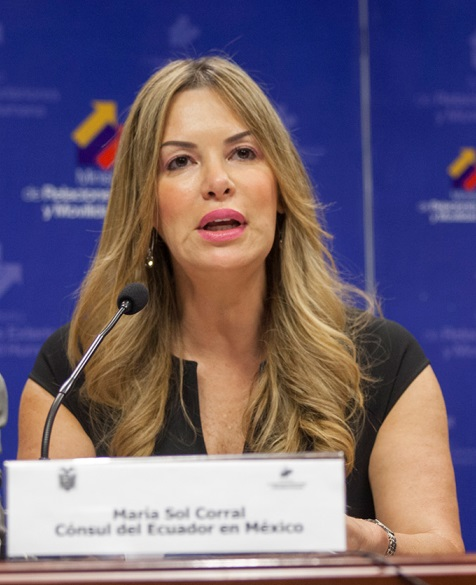
- Born: 1965 (age 60–61); Quito, Ecuador
- Occupations: Public image consultant, politician
- Known for: Miss Ecuador and a consul in Mexico
- Political party: United Ecuadorian movement and the Socialist Party

María Sol Corral Zambrano (born 1965) is an Ecuadorian actress, politician, diplomat and beauty pageant titleholder who represented her country at Miss World 1984. She was consul at the Ecuadorian embassy in Mexico. She was Miss World Ecuador in 1984 and a deputy mayor of Quito.

== Life ==
Corral was born in Quito in 1965.

She was Miss World Ecuador in 1984 and she acted in TV soaps.

She was an image consultant on the political campaigns of Roberto Campa and Rafael Correa in 2006. In 2007 she led President Lenín Moreno's office.

She was a Deputy Mayor of Quito before was became a consul at the Ecuadorian embassy in Mexico In 2014. Corral was appointed by the President, Rafael Correa, as the Consul General in Mexico. She was looking after migrants from Ecuador, implementing a virtual Consulate and helping with Ecuadorian tourist visas for Mexico. She was a consul in Mexico until 2018.

In 2019, she was a candidate for mayor of Quito for the United Ecuadorian movement and the Socialist Party.

In 2022, she was listed as an image consultant to the Women Economic Forum.

== Private life ==
On December 7, 2007, the Mexican singer Ninel Conde married her second husband, businessman Juan Zepeda. The couple separated in August 2013. It was reported in 2015 that the marriage to Zepeda was invalid as he was already married to María Sol Corral of Ecuador and they had two children. She had presented her marriage certificate and noted that her former husband did not contribute financially to maintain their children.
