= Astrid Carolina Herrera =

Venezuelan actress and beauty queen (born 1963)

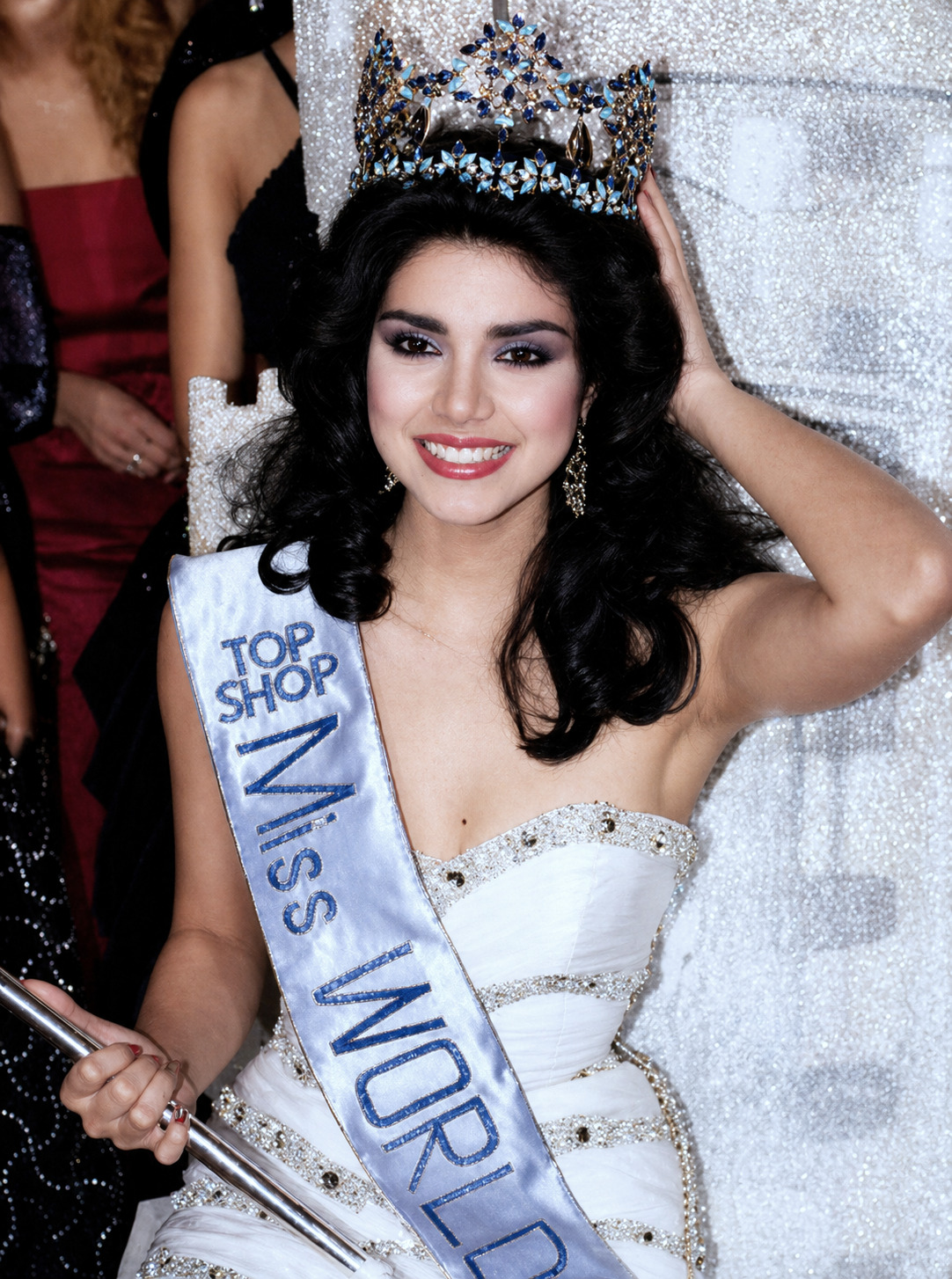
- Herrera in 1984
- Born: Astrid Carolina Herrera Irazábal; June 23, 1963 (age 63); San Felipe, Venezuela
- Occupations: Actress and model
- Height: 1.73 m (5 ft 8 in)
- Spouses: Édgar Ignacio Padrón Godoy (m. 1998; div. 2001); Tony Álvarez (m. 2002; div. 2005)
- Children: 1
- Beauty pageant titleholder
- Title: Miss World 1984
- Years active: 1984-2011
- Hair color: Black
- Eye color: Brown
- Major competitions: Miss Venezuela 1984 (1st runner-up)

Astrid Carolina Herrera Irazábal (born June 23, 1963) is a Venezuelan actress and beauty queen who won Miss World 1984 pageant in London, United Kingdom, becoming the third woman from her country to win the title.

== Biography ==
Astrid Carolina Herrera Irazábal was born on June 23, 1963, in Yaracuy, Venezuela. She is the third daughter of David Herrera and Odelia Irazábal. She has three sisters and one brother.

== Personal life ==
In 1988, she married the military man Edgar Ignacio Padrón Godoy. The couple divorced in 2001. In 2002, she married the Venezuelan baseball player Tony Álvarez in the Mayor's Office of Carrizal, Miranda. The couple divorced in 2005. On June 5, 2014, she gave birth to her first child, a girl, whom she called Miranda Carolina Herrera Irazábal. In 2017, she underwent surgery for a tumor in the pituitary gland that turned out to be benign.

== Pageantry ==
=== Miss World Venezuela ===
Herrera, who stands 1.73 m (5 ft 8 in) tall, competed in 1984 as Miss Miranda in her country's national beauty pageant, Miss Venezuela, obtaining the title of Miss World Venezuela.

=== Miss World ===
As the official representative of her country to the 1984 Miss World pageant held in London, United Kingdom on November 15, 1984, she obtained the Photogenic award, became Miss World Americas and was crowned Miss World 1984.

== Filmography ==
=== Television ===
Year	Title	Character	Channel
1987-1988	Mi amada Beatriz	Estefanía	RCTV
1988-1989	Alma mía	Alma Mía	RCTV
1988-1989	Abigail	Amanda Riquelme	RCTV
1989	La pasión de Teresa	Teresa de Jesús Velasco	RCTV
1990	Emperatriz	Endrina Lander Corona/Eugenia Sandoval	Venevisión/Marte Televisión
1992	La loba herida	Isabel Campos/Álvaro Castillo/Lucero Gitano	Venevisión/Marte Televisión
1992	Las dos Dianas	Jimena	Marte Televisión
1992	Divina obsesión	Daniela Esposito	Marte Televisión
1993-1994	Morena Clara	Clara Rosa Guzmán/Clara Rosa "Morena Clara" Aldara	Venevisión
1995-1996	El manantia	Eva María Sandoval	Producciones JES
2000-2001	Amantes de luna llena	Perla "La Perla" Mujica	Venevisión
2001-2002	Secreto de amor	Yesenia Roldán	Venevisión/Fonovideo Productions
2002	La mujer de Judas	Altagracia del Toro	RCTV
2003	Engañada	Yolanda	Venevisión
2004-2005	Sabor a ti	Raiza Alarcón de Lombardi	Venevisión
2007-2008	Arroz con leche	Abril Lefebvre	Venevisión
2011	La viuda joven	Ivana Humboldt de Calderón	Venevisión

Awards and achievements
Preceded by (United Kingdom) Sarah-Jane Hutt	Miss World; 1984	Succeeded by (Iceland) Hólmfríður Karlsdóttir
Preceded by (Colombia) Rocío Isabel Luna	Miss World Americas; 1984	Succeeded by (United States) Brenda Denton
Preceded by (Socialist Federal Republic of Yugoslavia) Bernarda Marovt	Miss World Photogenic; 1984	Succeeded by (Zaire) Kayonga Mureka Tete
Preceded by Carolina Cerruti	Miss World Venezuela; 1984	Succeeded by Ruddy Rodríguez
Preceded by Donna Bottone	Miss Miranda; 1984	Succeeded by Yvonne Balliache
