= Miss Venezuela 1983 =

30th edition of the Miss Venezuela competition

- Date: May 5, 1983
- Presenters: Gilberto Correa; Carmen Victoria Pérez; Raúl Velasco†
- Venue: Macuto Sheraton Hotel, Caraballeda, Vargas state, Venezuela
- Broadcaster: Venevision
- Entrants: 22
- Placements: 8
- Winner: Paola Ruggeri; Portuguesa

Miss Venezuela 1983 was 30th Miss Venezuela pageant, was held in Caraballeda, Vargas state, Venezuela, on May 5, 1983, after weeks of events. The winner of the pageant was Paola Ruggeri, Miss Portuguesa.

The pageant was broadcast live on Venevision from the Macuto Sheraton Hotel in Caraballeda, Vargas state. At the conclusion of the final night of competition, outgoing titleholder Ana Teresa Oropeza, crowned Paola Ruggeri of Portuguesa as the new Miss Venezuela. The pageant telecast was also part of the network preparations for its broadcast of the 1983 Pan American Games in Caracas later in the year, with Joaquin Rivera acting as executive producer of both the opening and closing ceremonies. For this, a special number was done during the pageant promoting the multisport event.

== Results ==
=== Placements ===
- Miss Venezuela 1983 - Paola Ruggeri (Miss Portuguesa)

The runners-up were:

- 1st runner-up - Carolina Cerruti (Miss Apure)
- 2nd runner-up - Donna Bottone (Miss Miranda)
- 3rd runner-up - Isabel Yépez (Miss Amazonas)
- 4th runner-up - Helene Chemaly † (Miss Distrito Federal)
- 5th runner-up - Marina Rueda (Miss Monagas)
- 6th runner-up - Dalia Linares (Miss Lara)
- 7th runner-up - Laura García (Miss Barinas)

=== Special awards ===
- Miss Photogenic (voted by press reporters) - Marbellyz Roa (Miss Guárico)
- Miss Congeniality - Reina Venturini (Miss Falcón)
- Miss Elegance - Adriana Novellino (Miss Táchira)
- Miss Amistad - Paulina Parada (Miss Mérida)
- Miss National Press - Carolina Cerruti (Miss Apure)

== Contestants ==
The Miss Venezuela 1983 delegates are:

- Miss Amazonas - Isabel Teresa Yépez
- Miss Anzoátegui - Millarca (Mila) Márquez Chaumier
- Miss Apure - Carolina Cerruti Duijm
- Miss Aragua - Julie Miralles
- Miss Barinas - Laura García Flores
- Miss Bolívar - Yadira Caraballo
- Miss Carabobo - Maria Eugenia Larrain
- Miss Delta Amacuro - Vera Fawzy Sayed†
- Miss Departamento Vargas - Josefina Durán Longa
- Miss Distrito Federal - Helene Chemaly Abudei†
- Miss Falcón - Reina Venturini Madrigal
- Miss Guárico - Marbellyz Roa Cermeño
- Miss Lara - Dalia Di Filippo Linares
- Miss Mérida - Paulina Parada Sandrock
- Miss Miranda - Donnatella Tiranti Bottone
- Miss Monagas - Marina Rueda Menero
- Miss Nueva Esparta - Evelyn Luján
- Miss Portuguesa - Paola Ruggeri Ghigo
- Miss Sucre - Ana Sayeg
- Miss Táchira - Adriana Novellino Blonval
- Miss Yaracuy - Gisel Arrivillaga
- Miss Zulia - Susana Cavazza Castellano
