= Carmen María Montiel =

American politician

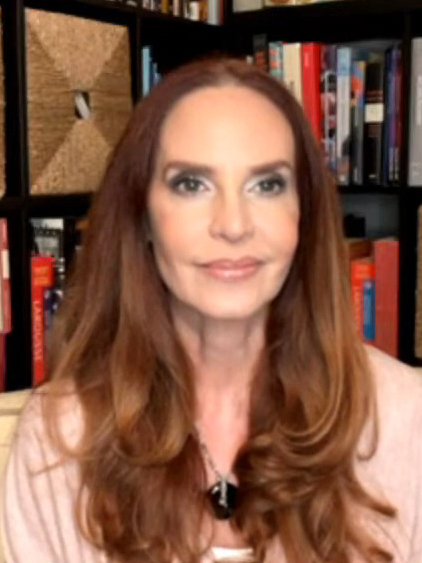
- Montiel in 2021
- Born: Carmen María Montiel Ávila; December 19, 1964 (age 61); Maracaibo, Venezuela
- Education: Central University of Venezuela; East Tennessee State University (BA)
- Political party: Republican

Carmen María Montiel Ávila (born December 19, 1964) is a Venezuelan-American journalist, politician, writer, activist and beauty pageant titleholder who won Miss Venezuela 1984. She is the author of the 2020 memoir Stolen Identity: A Story of Love, Violence and Liberation.

== Education and career ==
Born in Maracaibo, Venezuela, to a traditional Spanish colonial family, Montiel entered the Miss Venezuela pageant at age 19; she would win Miss Venezuela, Miss South America, and second runner-up in Miss Universe Pageant in 1984. That year, Montiel would create the charitable foundation "Las Misses" to aid pediatric hospitals in Venezuela, Ecuador, and Peru.

Also, that year, while studying at the Universidad Central of Venezuela, Montiel was hired by Venevisión, first to co-host the morning talk show Buenos Días Venezuela with Manuel Correa, and the following year to host Close Up, a weekly celebrity news show. In 1986, she became a frequent guest on the Mexican Sunday celebrity spotlight program Siempre en Domingo and hosted the Miss Universe Special in Panama.

Her journalistic work expanded into radio that year, beginning a stint as disc jockey and producer at the Caracas-based RQ 910, on which she told the stories of young people who exemplified character and hard work. Also, from 1986 through 1988, she co-hosted the three-hour weekday-morning magazine show Complicidades with Maite Delgado and Eva Gutierrez.

In the late 1980s, Montiel came to the United States to complete her journalism studies. She received a bachelor's in Broadcasting and Spanish, Magna Cum Laude, from East Tennessee State University in Johnson City in 1991. Montiel went on to work as a television news anchor, reporter, and writer at Telemundo-CNN in Houston, Texas. She would report on-site at the 1992 GOP Convention in Houston.

Since that time, Montiel has been a television producer, writer, and correspondent for such companies as Provicom and TV Venezuela. Montiel has also been a real-estate entrepreneur.

Montiel has gained recognition for her pro-democracy and conservative activism. In 2018, she ran as a Republican for Texas's 29th Congressional District, the seat now held by Democratic representative Sylvia Garcia. In 2022 she ran again for Congress for Texas's 18th Congressional District, a seat held for almost thirty years by Democratic representative Sheila Jackson Lee. A frequent commentator in print and broadcast media, Montiel has drawn attention to human-rights and economic concerns in her native Venezuela. Montiel was also a candidate for the special election on November 4, 2025 for Texas's 18th Congressional District. After the death of Sheila Jackson Lee, who held the seat for almost 30 years, Sylvester Turner was elected in November 2024. Turner died on March 5, 2025, leaving the seat vacant for a new election.. While the election went to a run-off election in January 2026, Montiel finished fourth with 5,110 votes (6.71%) and received the most votes of any Republican candidate in the race.

== Memoir ==
Montiel wrote about physical and psychological abuses she survived during her marriage to her ex-husband in her 2020 memoir Stolen Identity: A Story of Love, Violence and Liberation. She describes the period she recounts as "the worst time of my life but also the most beautiful one" because, in her effort to protect herself and her children, she became closer to them and to her siblings who supported her. Montiel devotes much of her current philanthropic work to helping women who have endured domestic abuse.

== Charitable work ==
In addition to "Las Misses" and her work on behalf of domestic-violence victims, Montiel has also performed philanthropic work for the United Way and the Rainforest Foundation. She chaired the Latin Women's Initiative luncheon in 2006 and the "Gala de las Americas" for the Institute of Hispanic Culture of Houston in 2008. She has also served on the board of Success Scholarships as well as on various committees of the Museum of Fine Arts of Houston, for which she organized the Latin Mecenas for the museum's Latin American Art Department. She is currently on the Board of Directors of UNICEF, Virtuosi of Houston Institute of Hispanic Culture of Houston, and the Advisory Board of the Latin Women Initiative.

== Recognitions ==
In 2008, H Texas magazine named Montiel one of the 25 most beautiful people in Houston. The following year, she was named the most elegant lady of the European and Latin communities by Dinastia Latina magazine. She was named Woman of Distinction for the Crohn's & Colitis Foundation and Houston Chronicle's Best Dressed in Houston in 2010 and 2011 respectively.

Montiel has won numerous awards for her work including Woman of the Year, Zulia 1984; Lions Club Award 1985; Uni-Prensa Award 1985; Fundación "Las Granjas Infantiles" 1986; Meridiano de Oro 1987 and 1988; and Aquila de Oro 1988. The Consulate General of Mexico and The Houston Area Women's Center have recognized her for her journalistic work in the Houston Community.

== See also ==
- Hispanic and Latino conservatism in the United States

Awards and achievements
Preceded by (Venezuela) Paola Ruggeri	Miss Sudamérica; 1984	Succeeded by (Venezuela) Silvia Martínez
Preceded by Paola Ruggeri	Miss Venezuela; 1984	Succeeded by Silvia Martínez
