= Miss Venezuela 1984 =

31st edition of the Miss Venezuela competition

- Date: May 11, 1984
- Presenters: Gilberto Correa; Carmen Victoria Pérez; Raúl Velasco
- Venue: Macuto Sheraton Hotel, Caraballeda, Vargas, Venezuela
- Broadcaster: Venevision
- Entrants: 23
- Placements: 8
- Winner: Carmen María Montiel; Zulia

Miss Venezuela 1984 was the 31st Miss Venezuela pageant, was held in Caraballeda, Vargas state, Venezuela, on May 11, 1984, after weeks of events. The winner of the pageant was Carmen María Montiel, Miss Zulia.

The pageant, which included animals on stage for the first time, was broadcast live on Venevision from the Macuto Sheraton Hotel in Caraballeda, Vargas state. At the conclusion of the final night of competition, outgoing titleholder Paola Ruggeri, crowned Carmen María Montiel of Zulia as the new Miss Venezuela.

== Results ==
=== Placements ===
- Miss Venezuela 1984 – Carmen María Montiel (Miss Zulia)

The runners-up were:

- 1st runner-up – Astrid Carolina Herrera (Miss Miranda)
- 2nd runner-up – Miriam Leyderman (Miss Nueva Esparta)
- 3rd runner-up – Carla Mariani (Miss Carabobo)
- 4th runner-up – Mirla Ochoa † (Miss Delta Amacuro)
- 5th runner-up – Maria Teresa Ambrosino (Miss Barinas)
- 6th runner-up – Carolina Cristancho (Miss Aragua)
- 7th runner-up – Ana Rosa Abad (Miss Apure)

=== Special awards ===
- Miss Photogenic (voted by press reporters) – Astrid Carolina Herrera (Miss Miranda)
- Miss Congeniality – Consuelo Borges (Miss Amazonas)
- Miss Elegance – Maria Alejandra Castro Egui (Miss Guárico)
- Miss Amity – Maribel Aguilar (Miss Mérida)

== Contestants ==
The Miss Venezuela 1984 delegates are:

- Miss Amazonas – Consuelo Borges Hernández
- Miss Anzoátegui – Mariela Salma Caminiti
- Miss Apure – Ana Rosa Abad Perdomo
- Miss Aragua – Annette Carolina Cristancho Gruber
- Miss Barinas – María Teresa Ambrosino D'Amico
- Miss Bolívar – Petra María -Mery- Muñoz Ojeda
- Miss Carabobo – Carla Mariani Casentini
- Miss Cojedes – Yurby Josefina Bolaños
- Miss Delta Amacuro – Mirla Rociel Ochoa Silva†
- Miss Departamento Vargas – Martha Alida Salas Contreras
- Miss Distrito Federal – Antoinette Medina González
- Miss Falcón – Mary Loly Alba
- Miss Guárico – Maria Alejandra Castro Egui
- Miss Lara – Esther Querales Pérez
- Miss Mérida – Maribel Aguilar Meza
- Miss Miranda – Astrid Carolina Herrera Irazábal
- Miss Monagas – Maria de los Ángeles Morales Pavía
- Miss Nueva Esparta – Miriam Leyderman Eppel
- Miss Portuguesa – Mercedes Mercedes†
- Miss Sucre – Morelia Chávez González
- Miss Táchira – María Alejandra Niño Berti†
- Miss Yaracuy – Irene Dajdaj Firgau
- Miss Zulia – Carmen María Montiel Avila
