= List of diplomatic missions in Ecuador =

This is a list of diplomatic missions in Ecuador. At present, the capital city of Quito hosts 41 embassies, and several other missions or delegations or consulates, while several other countries have ambassadors accredited from other regional capitals. Several countries also maintain consulates or consulates general in other Ecuadorian cities. This listing excludes honorary consulates.

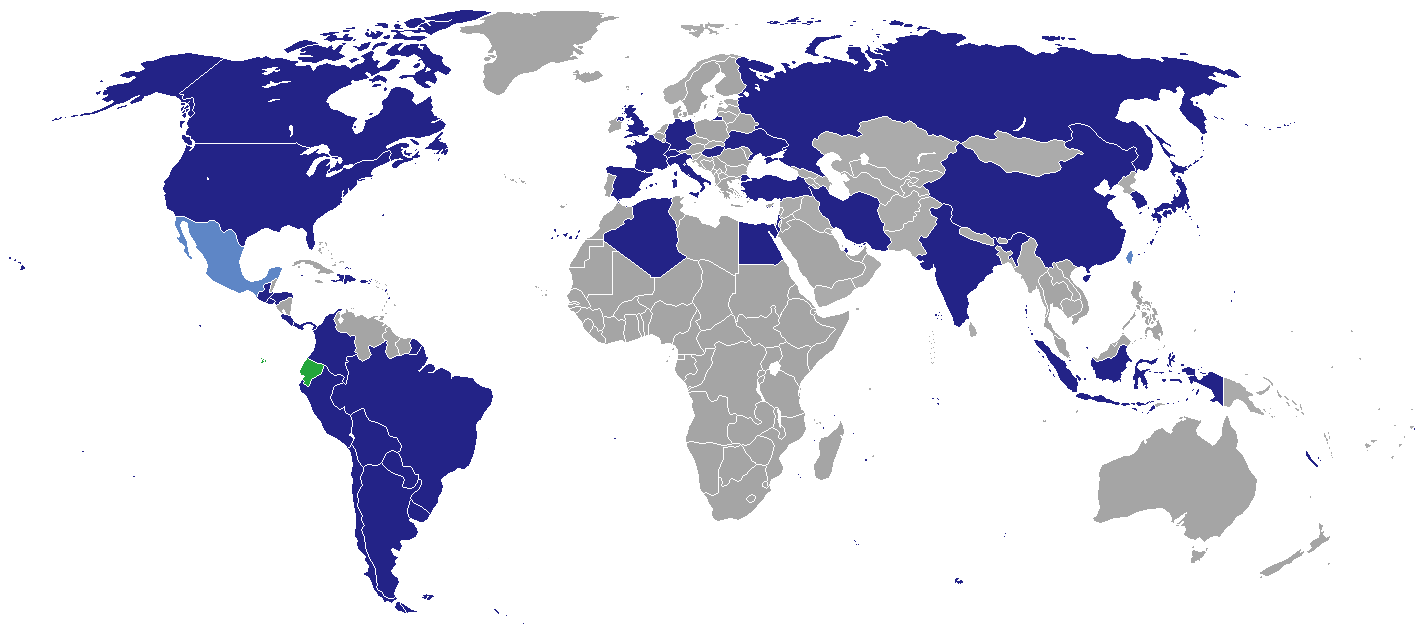
Map of diplomatic missions in Ecuador

== Diplomatic missions in Quito ==
=== Embassies ===
1. Algeria
2. Argentina
3. Bolivia
4. Brazil
5. Canada
6. Chile
7. China
8. Colombia
9. Costa Rica
10. Dominican Republic
11. Egypt
12. El Salvador
13. France
14. Germany
15. Guatemala
16. Haiti
17. Holy See
18. Honduras
19. Hungary
20. India
21. Indonesia
22. Iran
23. Israel
24. Italy
25. Japan
26. Lebanon
27. Palestine
28. Panama
29. Paraguay
30. Peru
31. Qatar
32. Russia
33. South Korea
34. Sovereign Military Order of Malta
35. Spain
36. Switzerland
37. Turkey
38. Ukraine
39. United Kingdom
40. United States
41. Uruguay

=== Other missions or delegations ===
1. European Union (Delegation)
2. Mexico (Interest Section) (Note: Under the protecting power of Switzerland.)
3. Taiwan (Commercial Office)

=== Gallery ===
Embassy of Argentina

Embassy of Egypt

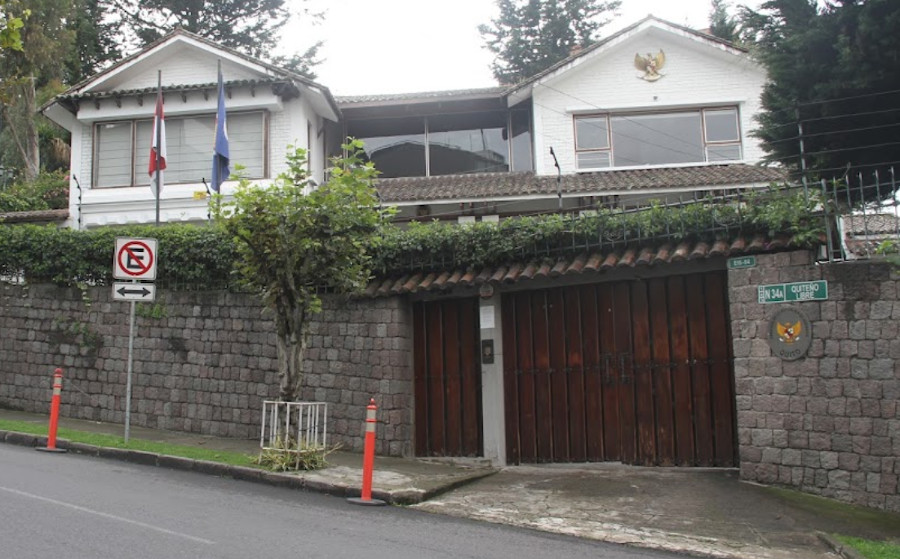
Embassy of Indonesia

Embassy of Russia

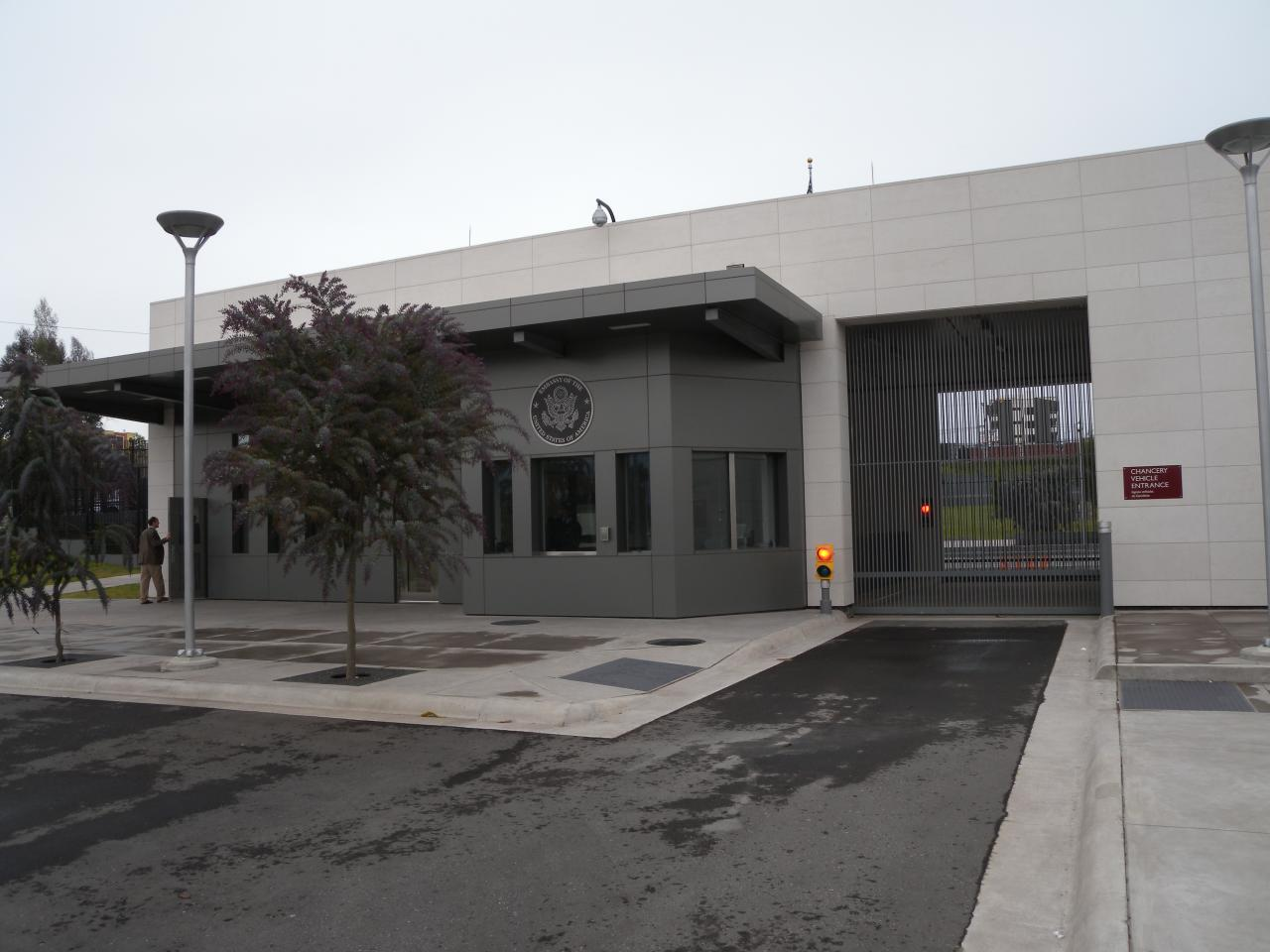
Embassy of the United States

== Consular missions ==
=== Cuenca ===
- Peru

=== Esmeraldas ===
- Colombia (Consulate)

=== Guayaquil ===
- Argentina (Consulate)
- Chile
- China
- Colombia (Consulate)
- Panama
- Peru
- Spain
- United States

=== Loja ===
- Peru

=== Machala ===
- Peru

=== Nueva Loja ===
- Colombia (Consulate)

=== Santo Domingo de los Colorados ===
- Colombia (Consulate)

=== Tulcán ===
- Colombia (Consulate)

== Non-resident Embassies accredited to Ecuador ==
=== Resident in Bogotá, Colombia ===
1. Austria
2. Morocco
3. New Zealand
4. Norway
5. Philippines
6. Portugal
7. Sweden

=== Resident in Brasília, Brazil ===
1. Albania
2. Armenia
3. Azerbaijan
4. Bahrain
5. Benin
6. Bulgaria
7. Burkina Faso
8. Cape Verde
9. Congo-Brazzaville
10. Ivory Coast
11. Ghana
12. Mali
13. Mauritania
14. Namibia
15. Oman
16. Saudi Arabia
17. Slovakia
18. Slovenia
19. Suriname
20. Tunisia
21. Zambia
22. Zimbabwe

=== Resident in Buenos Aires, Argentina ===
1. Angola
2. Georgia
3. Pakistan
4. Serbia

=== Resident in Caracas, Venezuela ===
1. Belarus
2. Equatorial Guinea
3. Grenada
4. Guyana
5. Nigeria
6. Saint Vincent and the Grenadines
7. Sudan
8. Trinidad and Tobago

=== Resident in Havana, Cuba ===
1. Ethiopia
2. Kenya
3. Mongolia
4. Sri Lanka

=== Resident in Lima, Peru ===
1. Belgium
2. Czechia
3. Finland
4. Greece
5. Netherlands
6. Poland
7. Romania
8. Thailand
9. United Arab Emirates

=== Resident in Santiago de Chile, Chile ===
1. Australia
2. Croatia
3. Denmark
4. Ireland
5. Jordan
6. Kuwait
7. Malaysia
8. South Africa
9. Syria
10. Vietnam

=== Resident elsewhere ===
1. Bangladesh (Mexico City)
2. Iceland (Ottawa)
3. Libya (Managua)
4. Madagascar (Washington, D.C.)
5. Nepal (New York City)
6. North Macedonia (Ottawa)
7. Uganda (Washington, D.C.)

== Closed missions ==
Host city	Sending country	Mission	Year closed	Ref.
Quito	Belarus	Embassy (Note: Resident in Bogotá, Colombia)	2021	
Quito	Belgium	Embassy (Note: Resident in Lima, Peru)	2006	
Quito	Bulgaria	Embassy	1990	
Quito	Cuba	Embassy	2026	
Quito	East Germany	Embassy	1990 (Note: Existed as a commercial mission in between 1965 and 1973, when it opened as an embassy after formal diplomatic relations were established.)	
Quito	Libya	Embassy (Note: Resident in Managua, Nicaragua)	2011	
Quito	Mexico	Embassy	2024	
Quito	Netherlands	Embassy	2012	
Quito	Nicaragua	Embassy	2024	
Quito	Romania	Embassy	2000	
Quito	Sweden	Embassy	1992	
Quito	Venezuela	Embassy	2024	
Cuenca	Colombia	Consulate	2014	
Guayaquil	Mexico	Consulate General	2009	
Guayaquil	Peru–Bolivia	Legation and Consulate General	1839	
Guayaquil	Venezuela	Consulate General	2024	
Macará	Peru	Consulate	2017	

== See also ==
- Foreign relations of Ecuador
- List of diplomatic missions of Ecuador
