= Paola Ruggeri =

Venezuelan swimmer

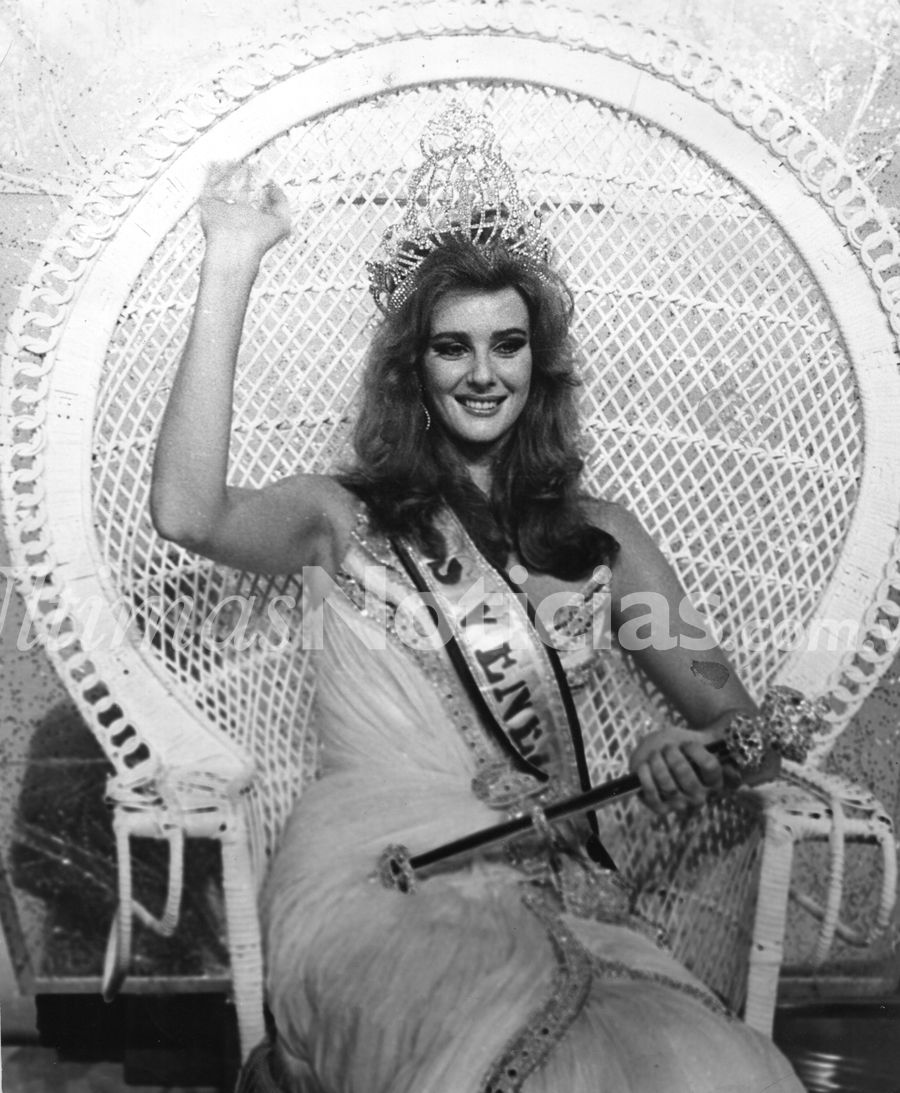
Paola Ruggeri

Paola Laura Ruggeri Ghigo (born July 14, 1961 in Caracas, Venezuela from an italo-venezuelan father and mother) is a Venezuelan athlete and beauty pageant titleholder who won Miss Venezuela 1983. She placed 7th in Miss Universe 1983 as the only Latin American among the Top 12 semifinalists.

== Miss Venezuela ==
Ruggeri competed in 1983 as Miss Portuguesa in her country's national beauty pageant, Miss Venezuela, capturing the crown and the right to represent her country in Miss Universe 1983.

== Miss Universe ==
As the official representative of her country to the 1983 Miss Universe pageant held in St. Louis, Missouri on July 11, 1983, she was the only Latin American contestant in the semifinals, won the preliminary swimsuit competition and placed third in the semifinal evening gown competition, placing 7th overall.

== Career ==
Ruggeri is also an Olympic Swimmer and keeps active as a Professional Swimmer. She competed in three events at the 1976 Summer Olympics.

Awards and achievements
Preceded by Ana Teresa Oropeza	Miss Venezuela; 1983	Succeeded by Carmen María Montiel
Vacant Title last held by (Venezuela) Irene Sáez (1981) as Miss Confraternidad Sudamericana	Miss Sudamérica; 1983	Succeeded by (Venezuela) Carmen María Montiel
