= List of diplomatic missions of Ecuador =

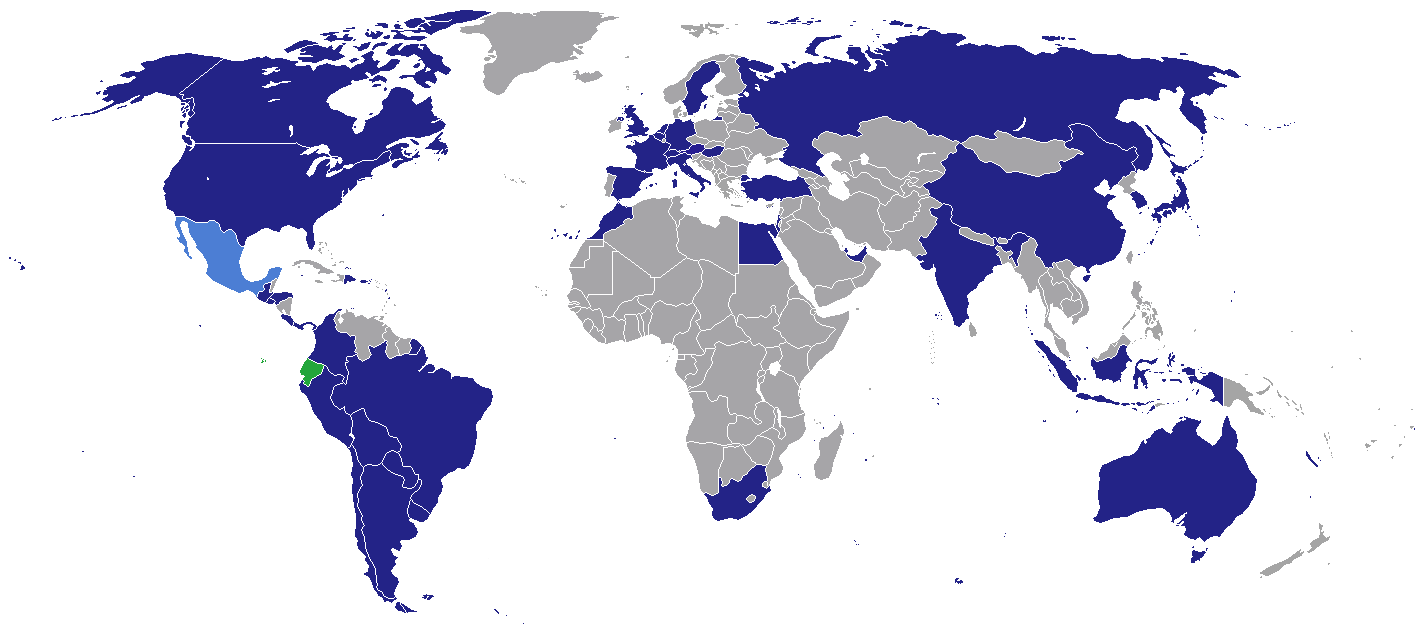
Diplomatic missions of Ecuador

This is a list of diplomatic missions of Ecuador, excluding honorary consulates.

== Current missions ==
=== Africa ===
Host country	Host city	Mission	Concurrent accreditation	Ref.
Egypt	Cairo	Embassy	Country: Bahrain; Saudi Arabia	
Morocco	Rabat	Embassy		
South Africa	Pretoria	Embassy	Countries: Angola; Equatorial Guinea; Mozambique; Namibia; Nigeria; Zimbabwe	

=== Americas ===
Host country	Host city	Mission	Concurrent accreditation	Ref.
Argentina	Buenos Aires	Embassy		
Argentina	Buenos Aires	Consulate-General		
Bolivia	La Paz	Embassy		
Brazil	Brasília	Embassy		
Brazil	São Paulo	Consulate-General		
Canada	Ottawa	Embassy	International Organization: International Civil Aviation Organization	
Canada	Toronto	Consulate-General	International Organization: International Civil Aviation Organization	
Chile	Santiago de Chile	Embassy		
Colombia	Bogotá	Embassy		
Colombia	Ipiales	Consulate-General		
Costa Rica	San José	Embassy		
Dominican Republic	Santo Domingo	Embassy		
El Salvador	San Salvador	Embassy	Country: Belize	
Guatemala	Guatemala City	Embassy	Country: Antigua and Barbuda; Grenada; Saint Lucia	
Honduras	Tegucigalpa	Embassy		
Mexico	Mexico City	Interest Section		
Panama	Panama City	Embassy		
Paraguay	Asunción	Embassy		
Peru	Lima	Embassy		
Peru	Tumbes	Consulate-General		
United States	Washington, D.C.	Embassy		
United States	Atlanta	Consulate-General		
United States	Chicago	Consulate-General		
United States	Houston	Consulate-General		
United States	Long Island City	Consulate-General		
United States	Los Angeles	Consulate General		
United States	Miami	Consulate-General		
United States	Minneapolis	Consulate-General		
United States	New Haven	Consulate-General		
United States	New York City	Consulate-General		
United States	Newark	Consulate-General		
United States	Phoenix	Consulate-General		
Uruguay	Montevideo	Embassy		
Uruguay	Montevideo	Consulate-General		

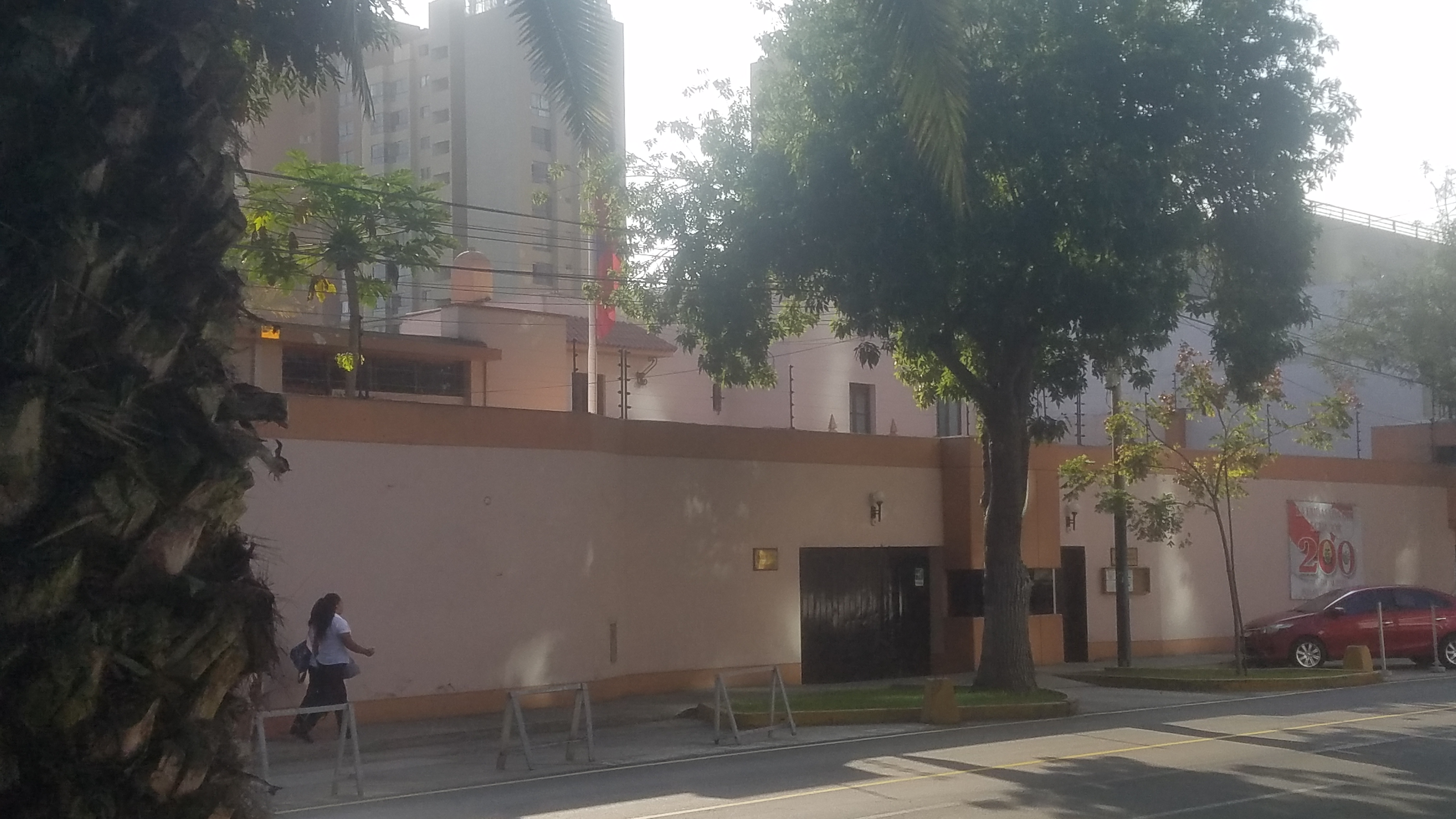
Embassy in Lima

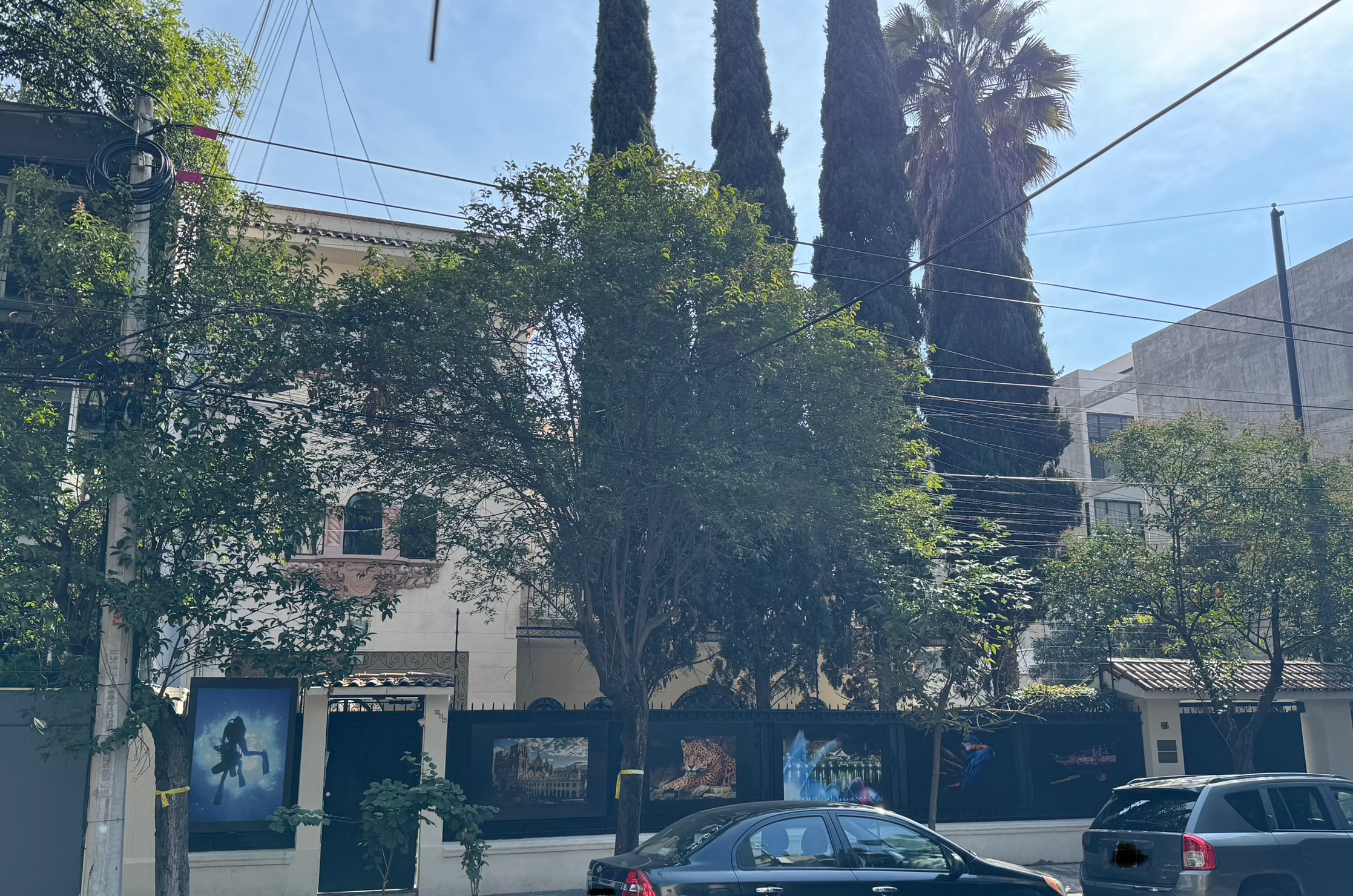
Interest section in Mexico City

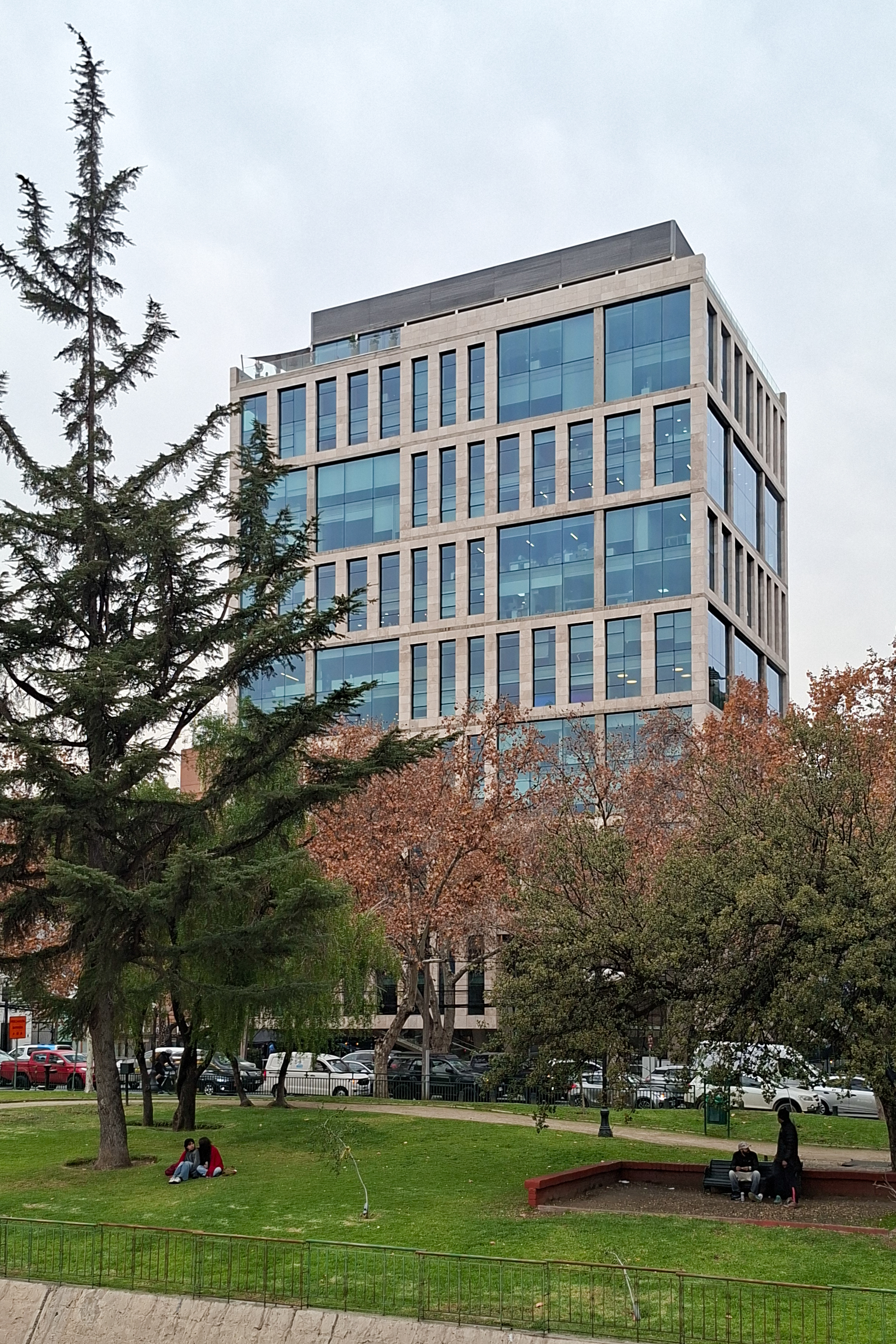
Building hosting the Embassy in Santiago

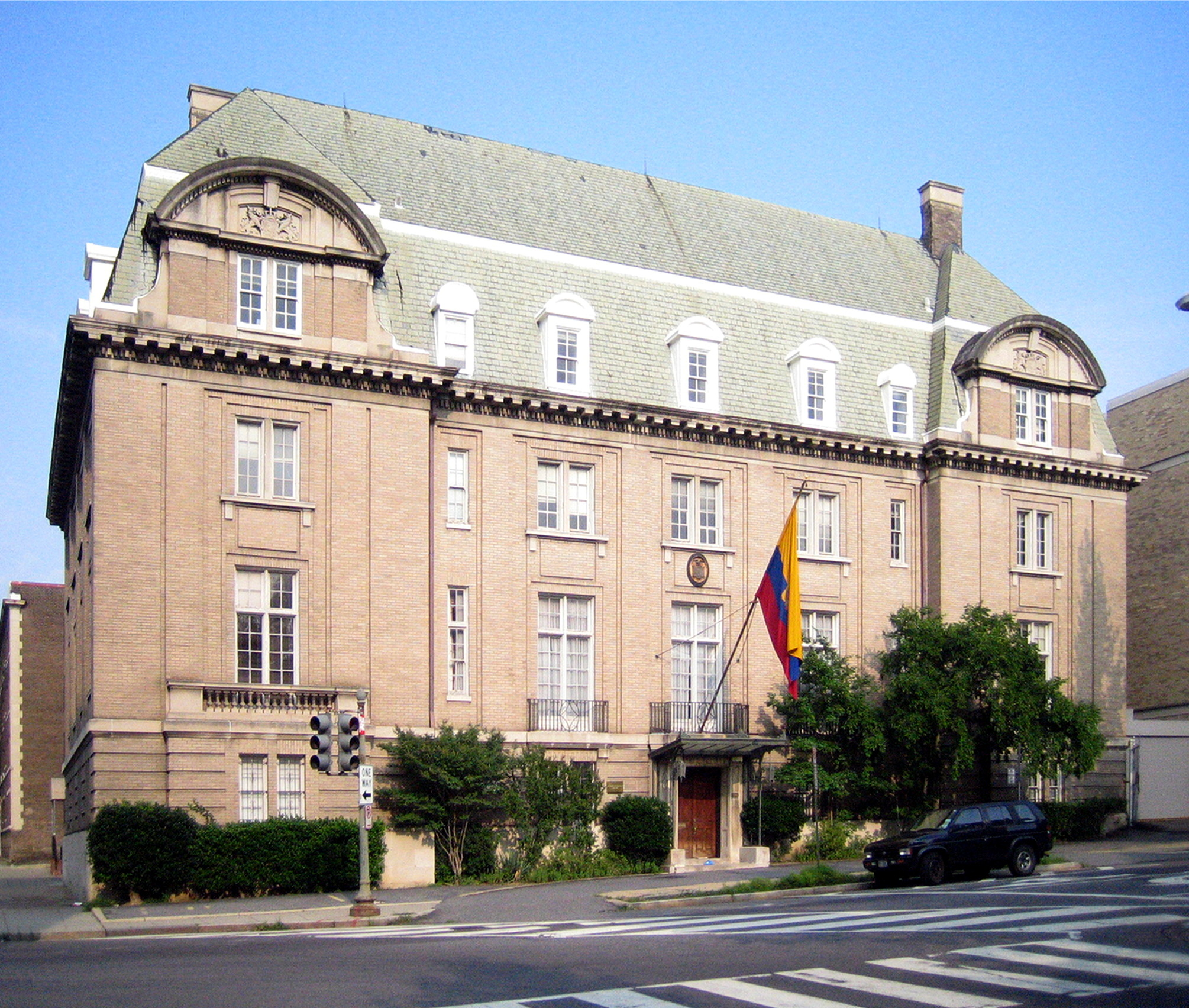
Embassy in Washington, D.C.

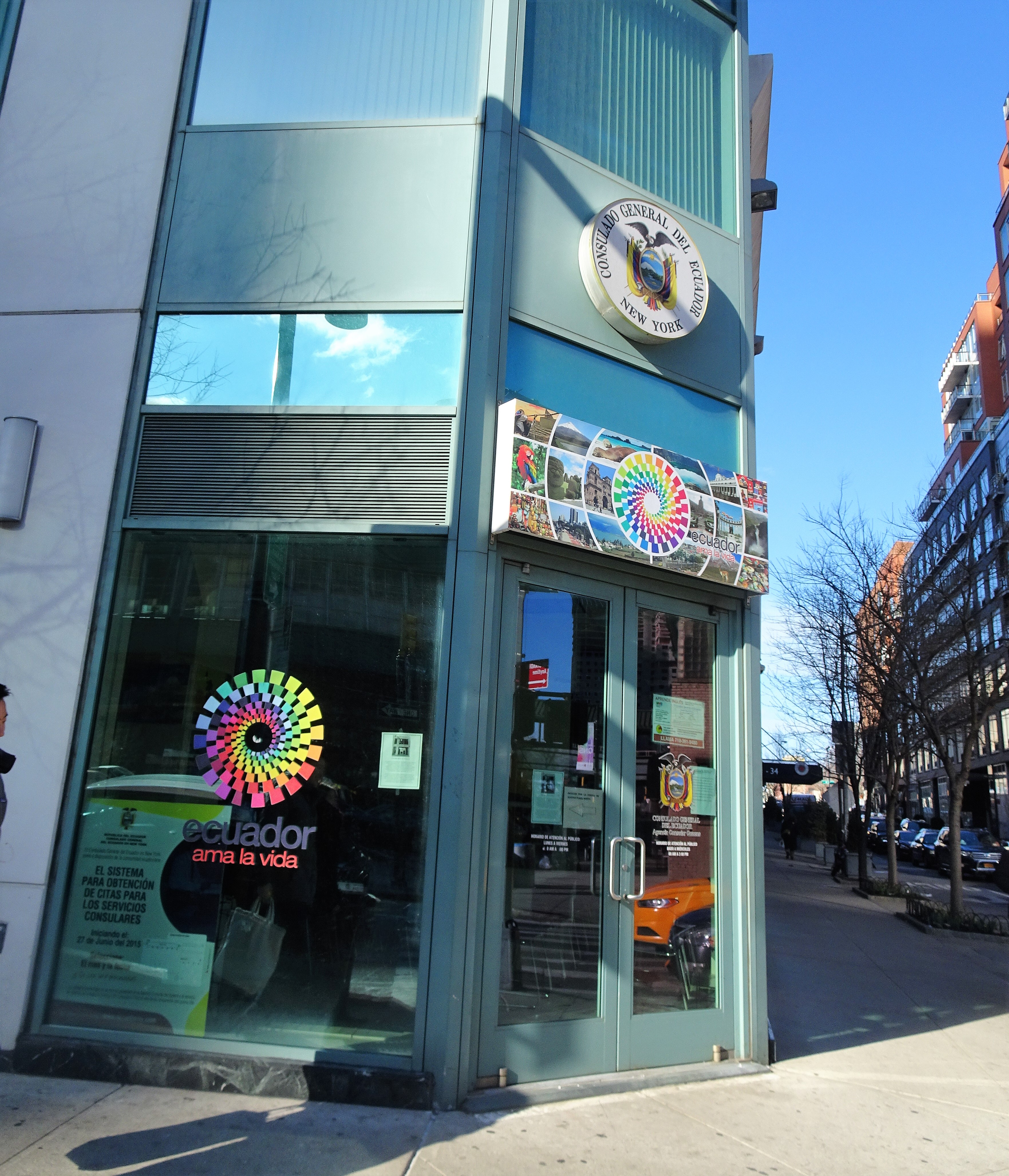
Consulate-General in Long Island City

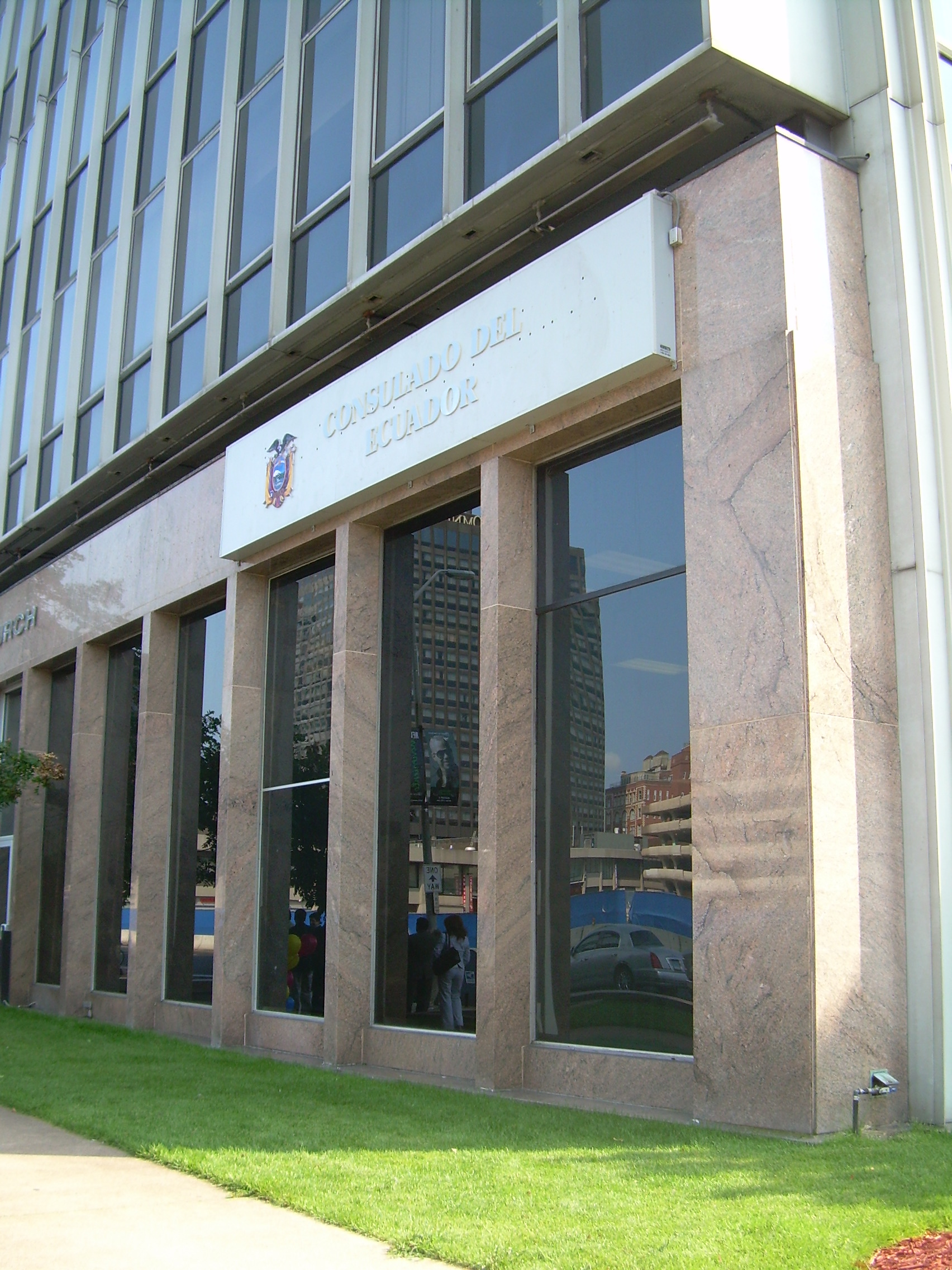
Consulate-General in New Haven

=== Asia ===
Host country	Host city	Mission	Concurrent accreditation	Ref.
China	Beijing	Embassy		
China	Guangzhou	Consulate-General		
China	Shanghai	Consulate-General		
India	New Delhi	Embassy	Countries: Bangladesh; Nepal; Sri Lanka	
Indonesia	Jakarta	Embassy	Countries: Brunei; Philippines; Singapore; Timor-Leste	
Israel	Tel Aviv	Embassy	Countries: Cyprus	
Japan	Tokyo	Embassy		
Palestine	Ramallah	Representative Office		
Qatar	Doha	Embassy	Countries: Iraq; Jordan; Kuwait; Lebanon; Oman; Syria	
South Korea	Seoul	Embassy		
Turkey	Ankara	Embassy		
United Arab Emirates	Abu Dhabi	Embassy		

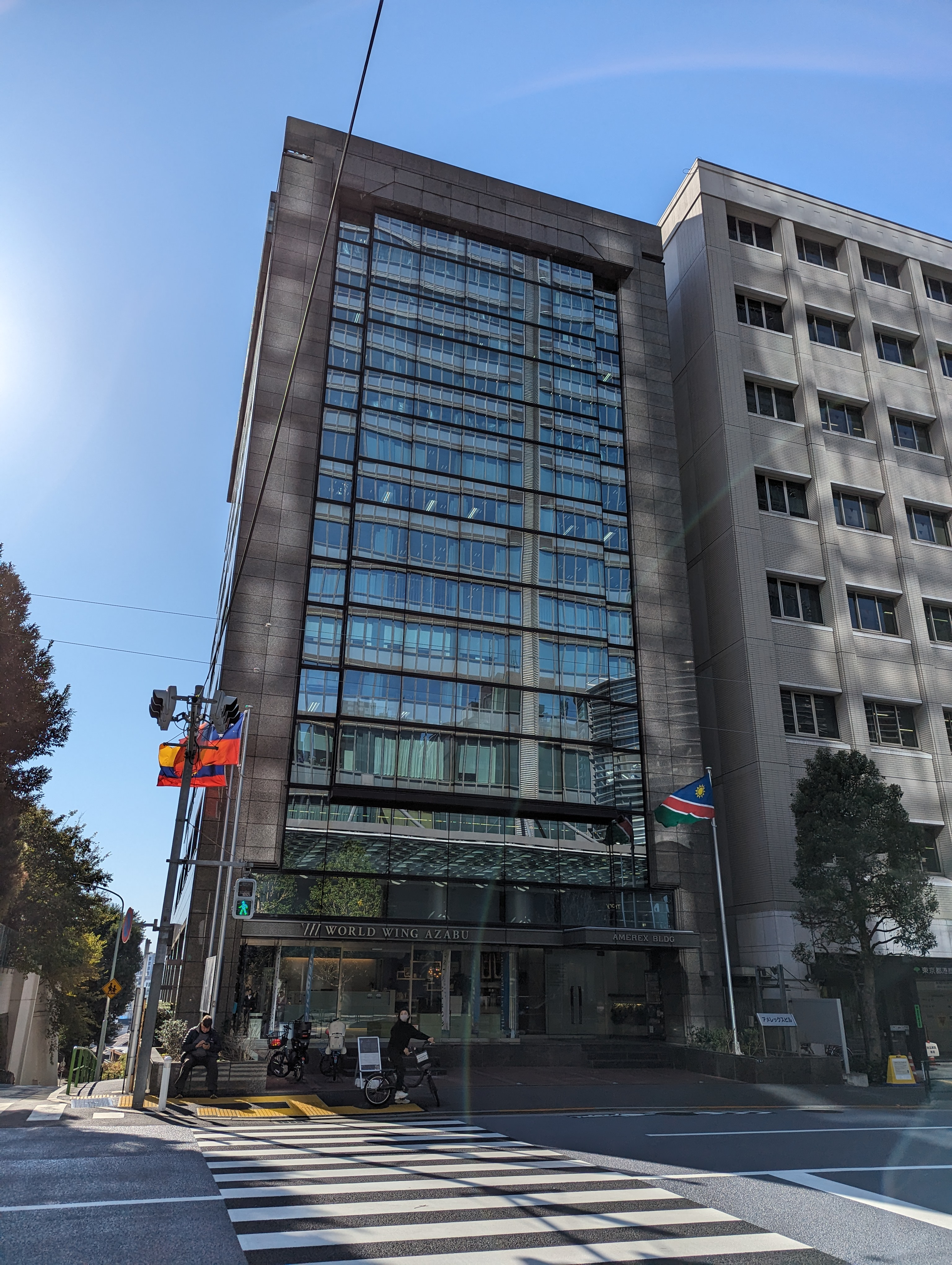
Embassy in Tokyo

=== Europe ===
Host country	Host city	Mission	Concurrent accreditation	Ref.
Austria	Vienna	Embassy	Countries: Poland; Ukraine; International Organizations: International Atomic Energy Agency; Comprehensive Nuclear-Test-Ban Treaty Organization; United Nations	
Belgium	Brussels	Embassy	International Organization: European Union	
France	Paris	Embassy	Country: Monaco	
Germany	Berlin	Embassy	Countries: Czech Republic; Estonia; Latvia; Lithuania	
Germany	Hamburg	Consulate	Countries: Czech Republic; Estonia; Latvia; Lithuania	
Holy See (Note: The Ecuadorian Embassy to the Holy See is located outside Vatican territory in Rome.)	Rome	Embassy	Country: Malta	
Hungary	Budapest	Embassy	Countries: Bulgaria; Croatia; Romania; Serbia	
Italy	Rome	Embassy	Countries: Greece; Slovenia	
Italy	Genoa	Consulate-General	Countries: Greece; Slovenia	
Italy	Milan	Consulate-General	Countries: Greece; Slovenia	
Netherlands	The Hague	Embassy		
Russia	Moscow	Embassy	Countries: Armenia; Belarus; Kazakhstan; Kyrgyzstan; Moldova	
Spain	Madrid	Embassy	Country: Andorra	
Spain	Madrid	Consulate-General	Country: Andorra	
Spain	Barcelona	Consulate-General	Country: Andorra	
Spain	Málaga	Consulate	Country: Andorra	
Spain	Murcia	Consulate	Country: Andorra	
Spain	Palma de Mallorca	Consulate	Country: Andorra	
Spain	Valencia	Consulate	Country: Andorra	
Sweden	Stockholm	Embassy	Countries: Denmark; Finland; Iceland; Norway	
Switzerland	Bern	Embassy	Country: Liechtenstein	
United Kingdom	London	Embassy	Countries: Ireland; Portugal	
United Kingdom	London	Consulate-General	Countries: Ireland; Portugal	

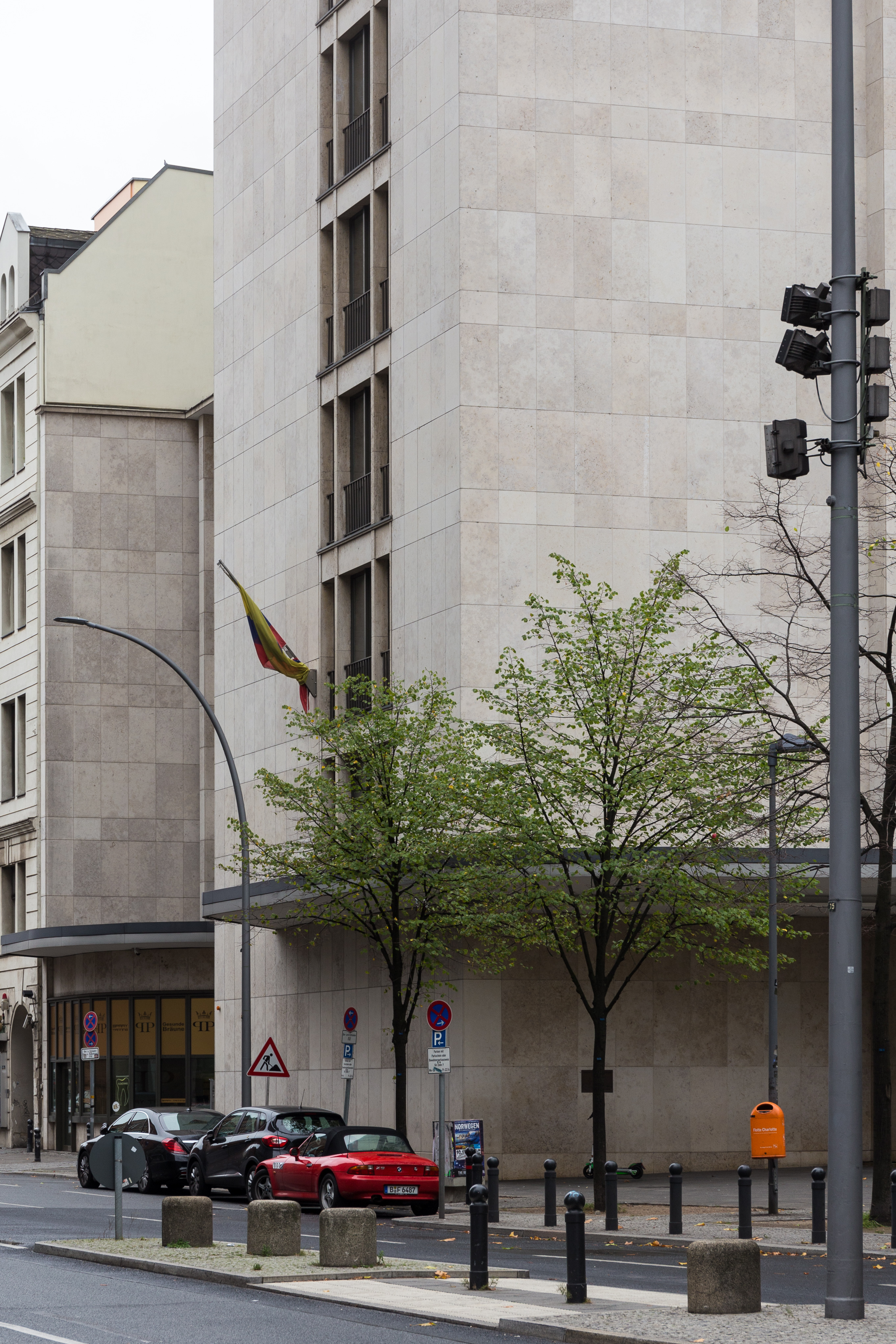
Building hosting the Embassy in Berlin

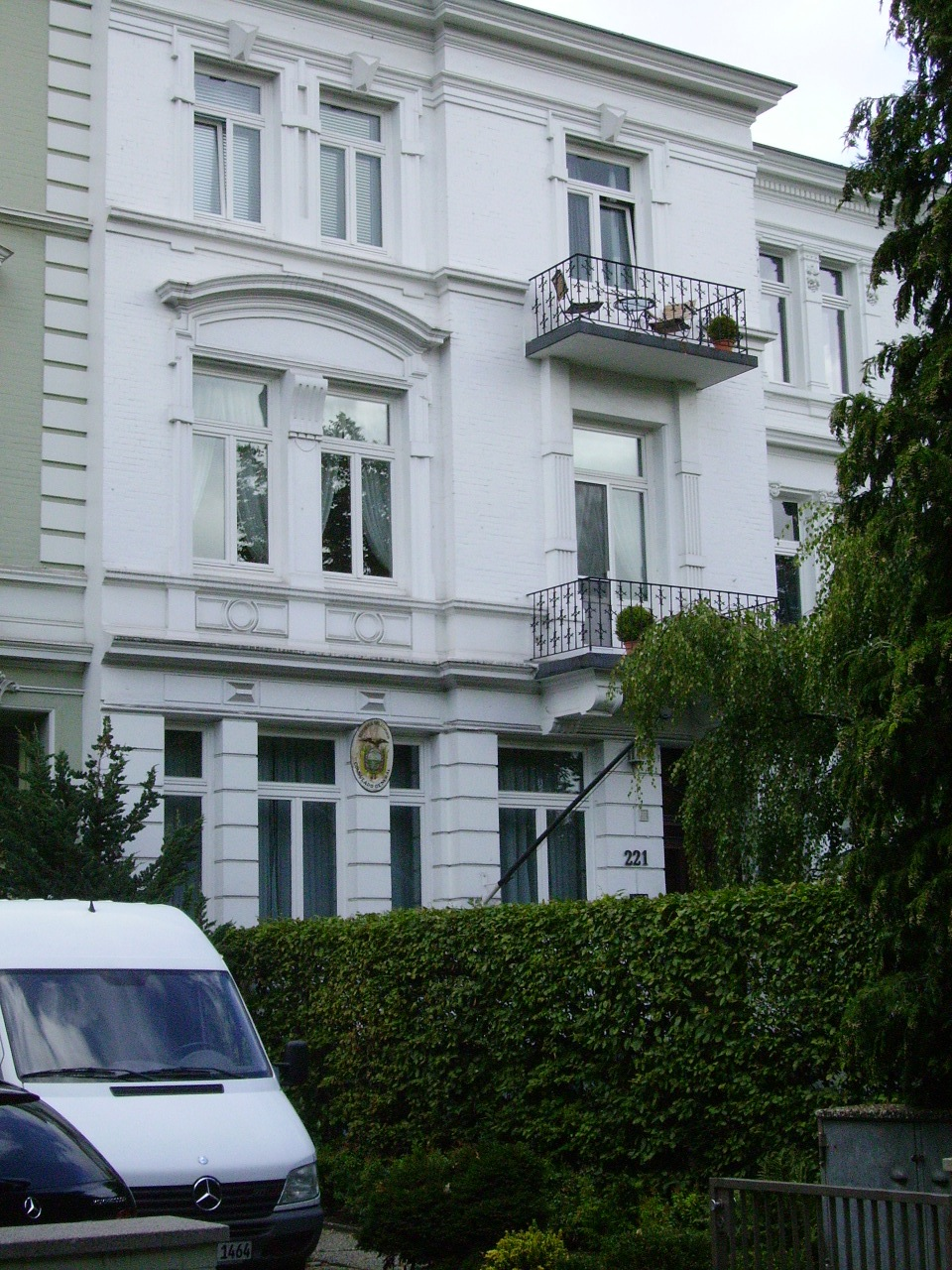
Consulate-General in Hamburg

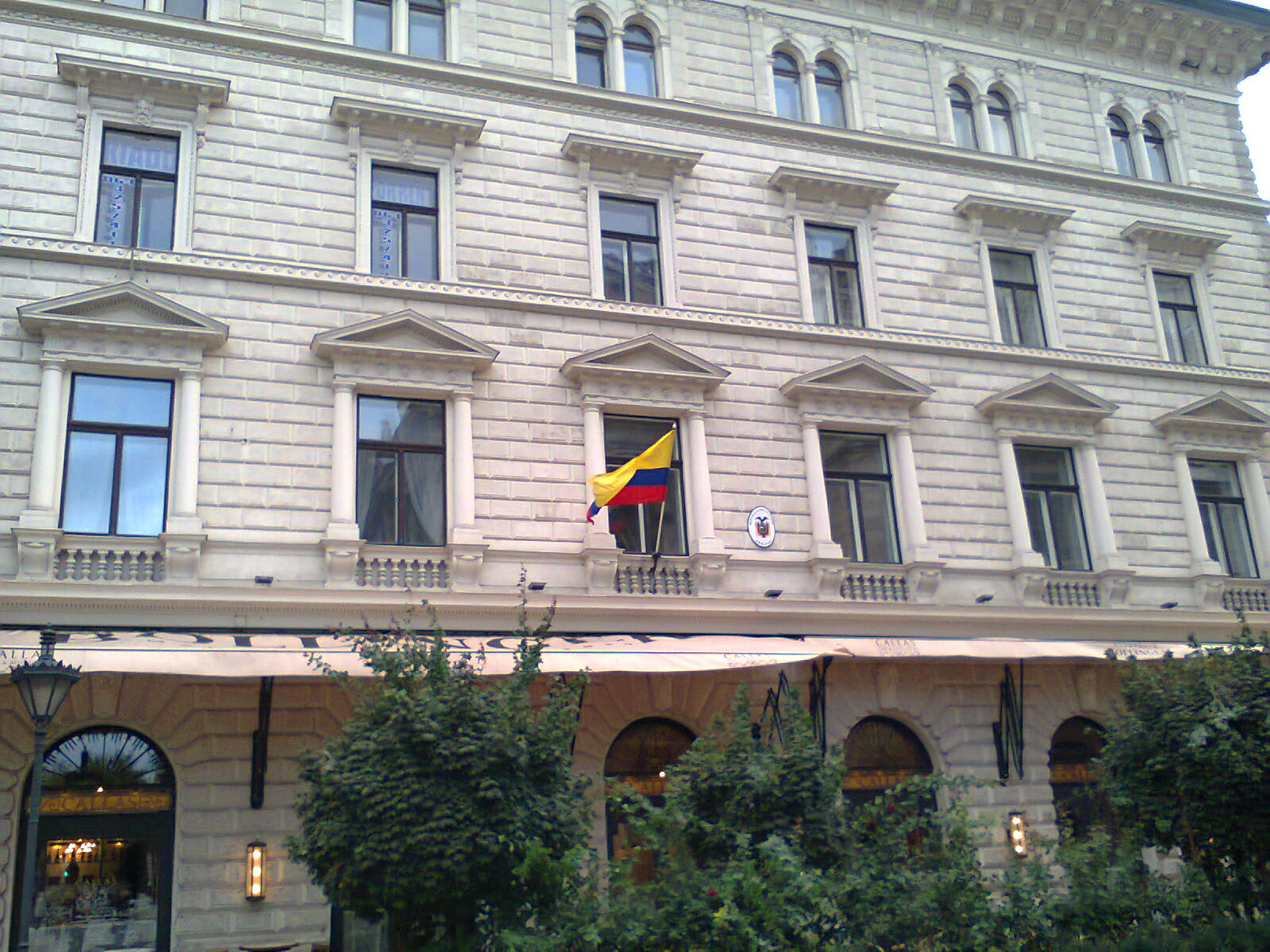
Embassy in Budapest

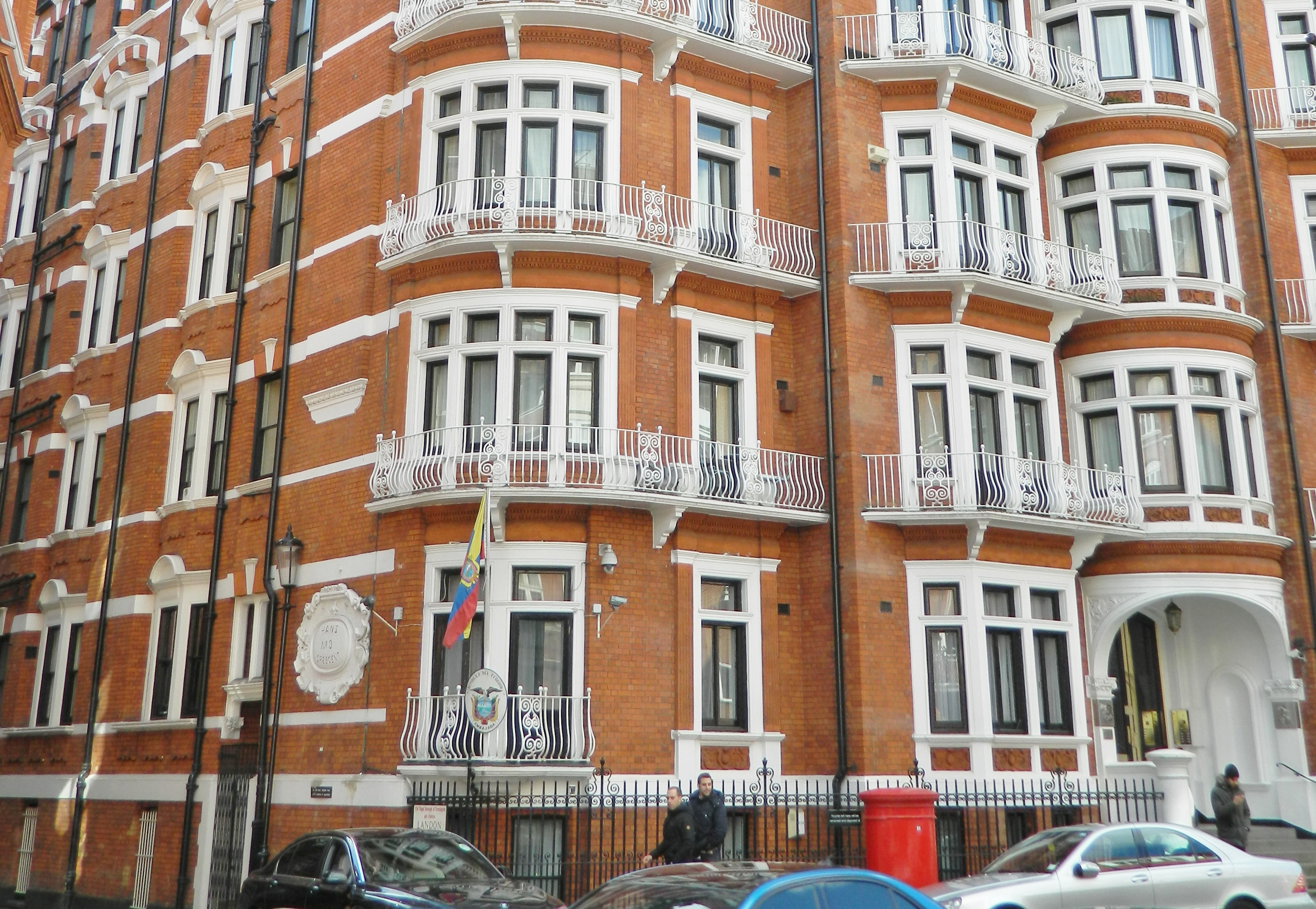
Building hosting the Embassy in London

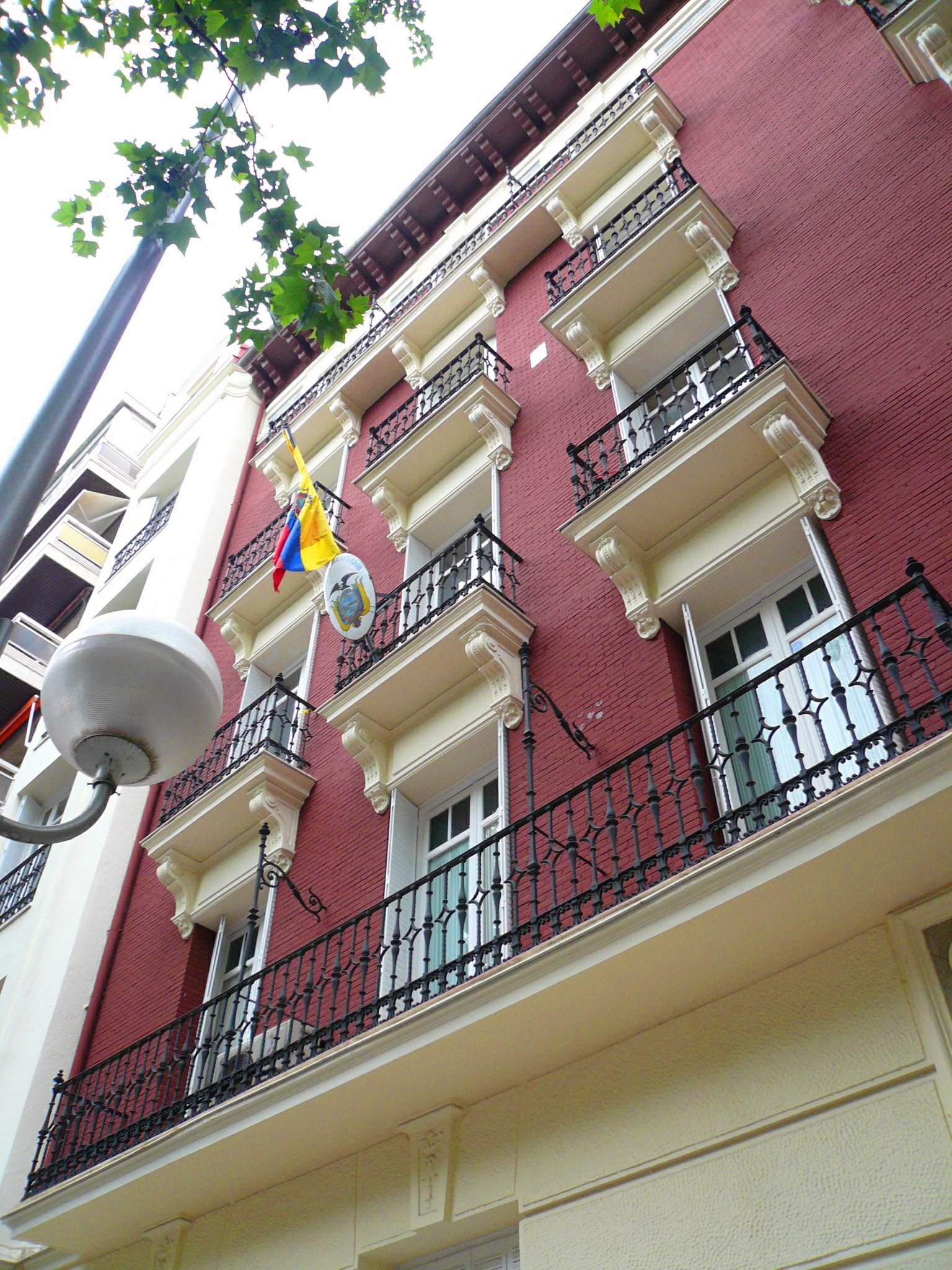
Embassy in Madrid

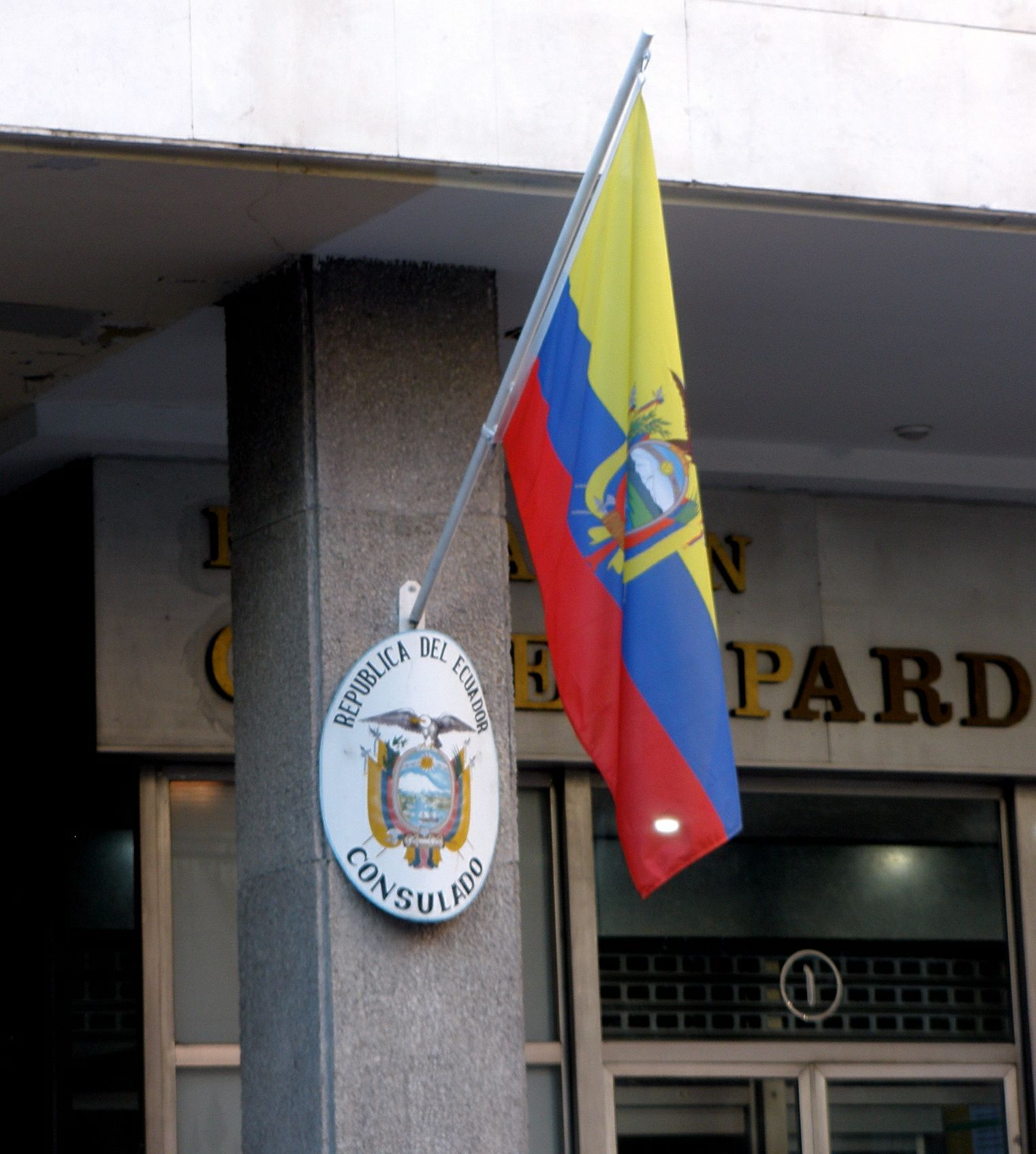
Consulate-General in Madrid

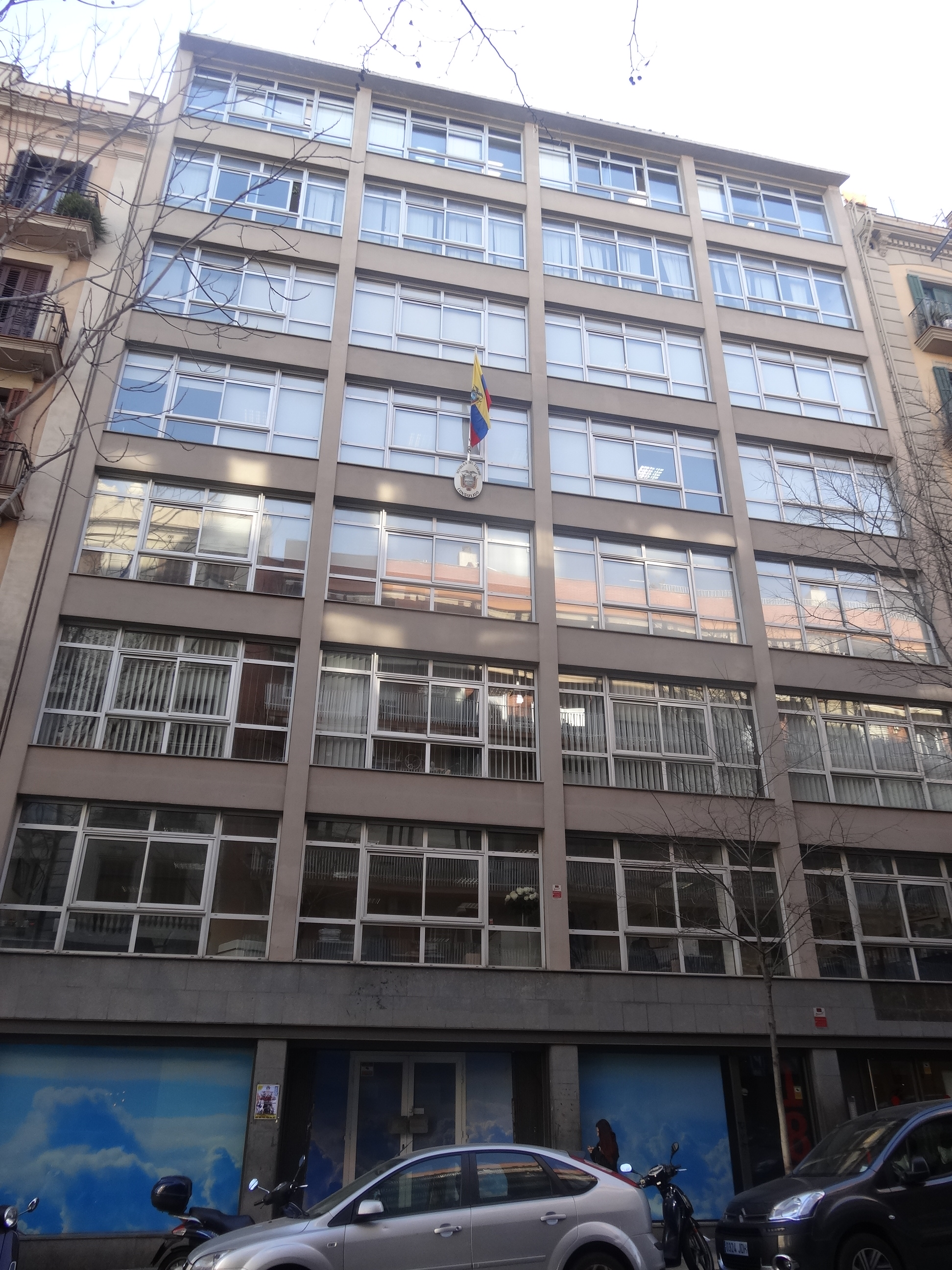
Consulate-General in Barcelona

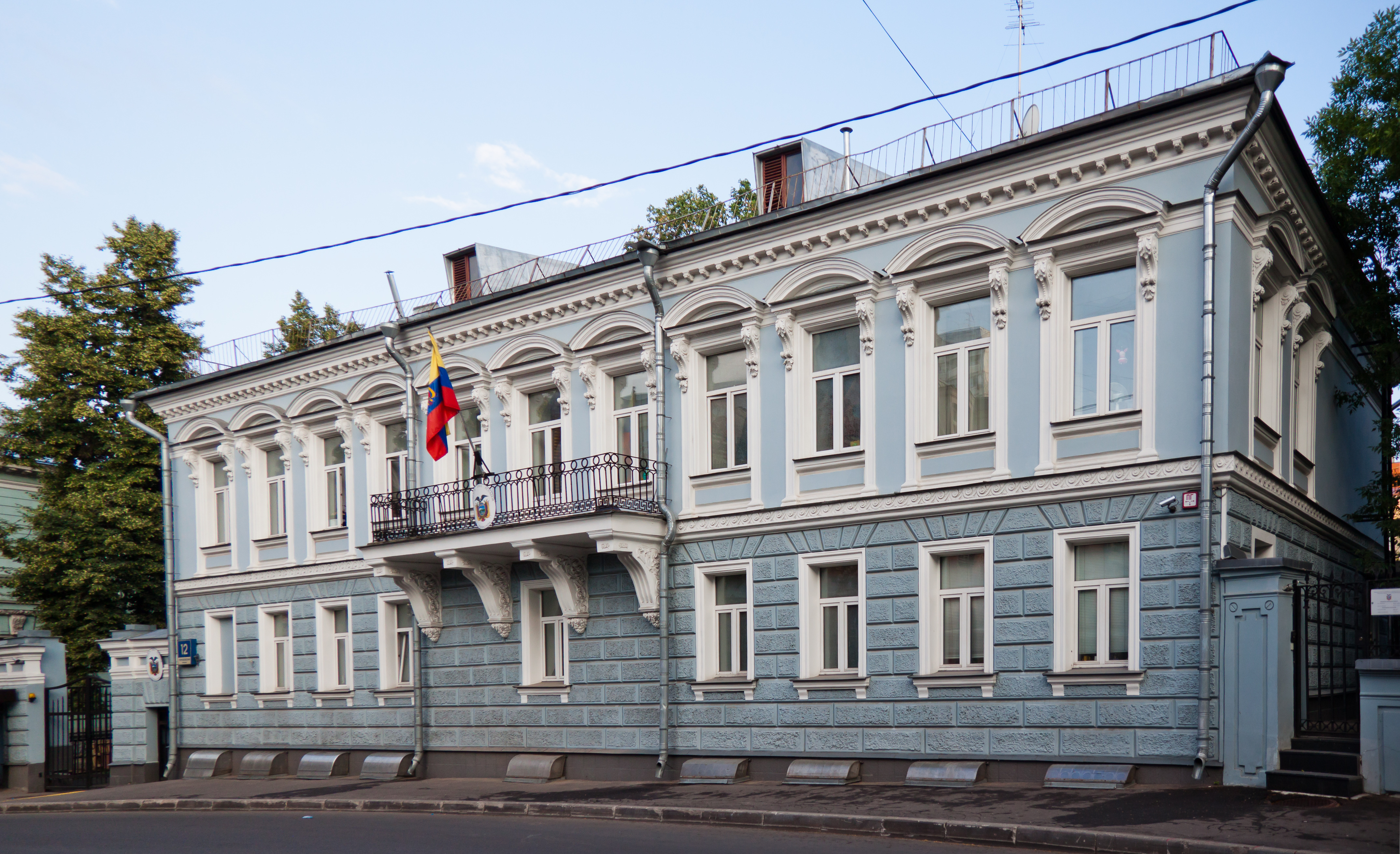
Embassy in Moscow

Embassy in Paris

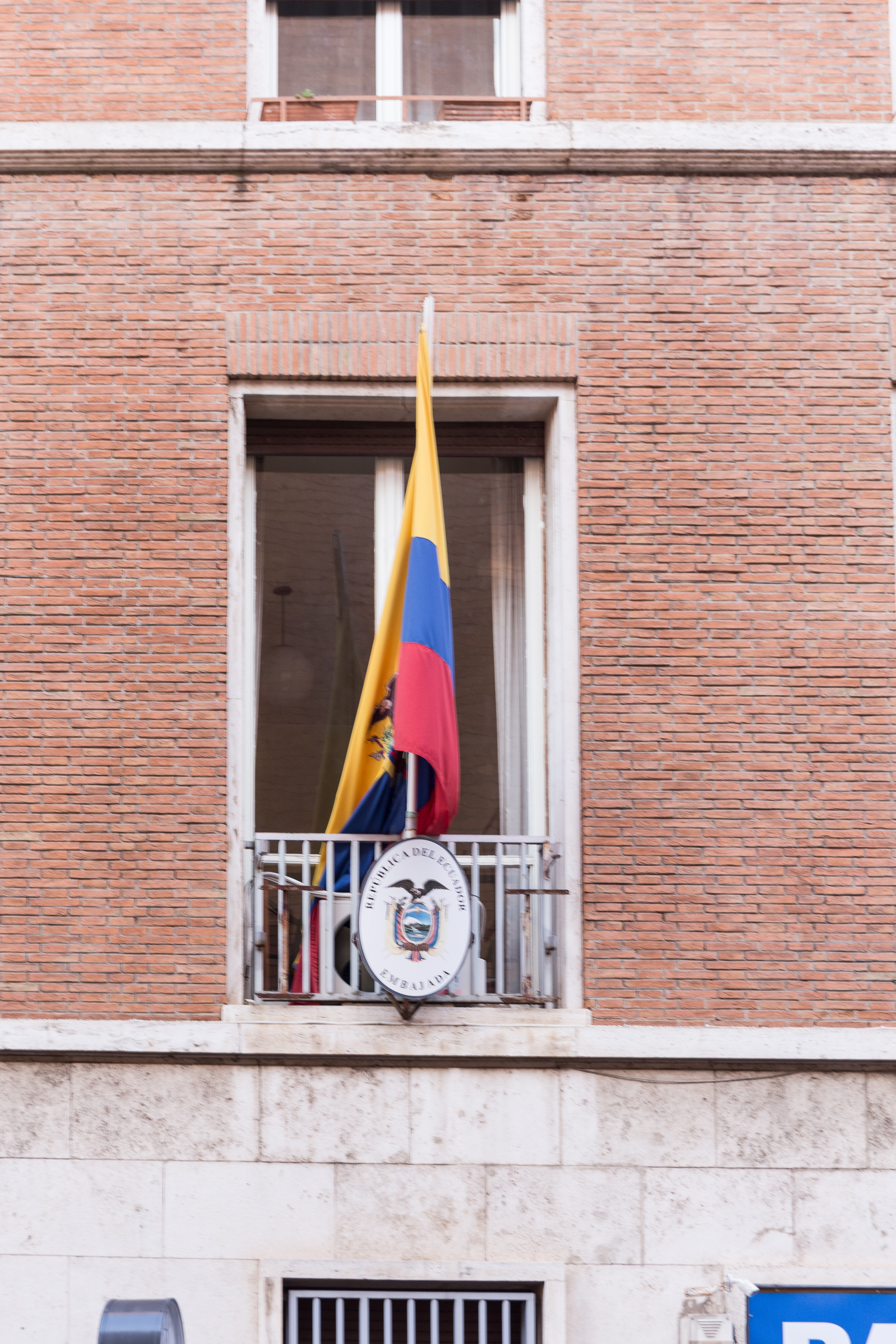
Embassy to the Holy See in Rome

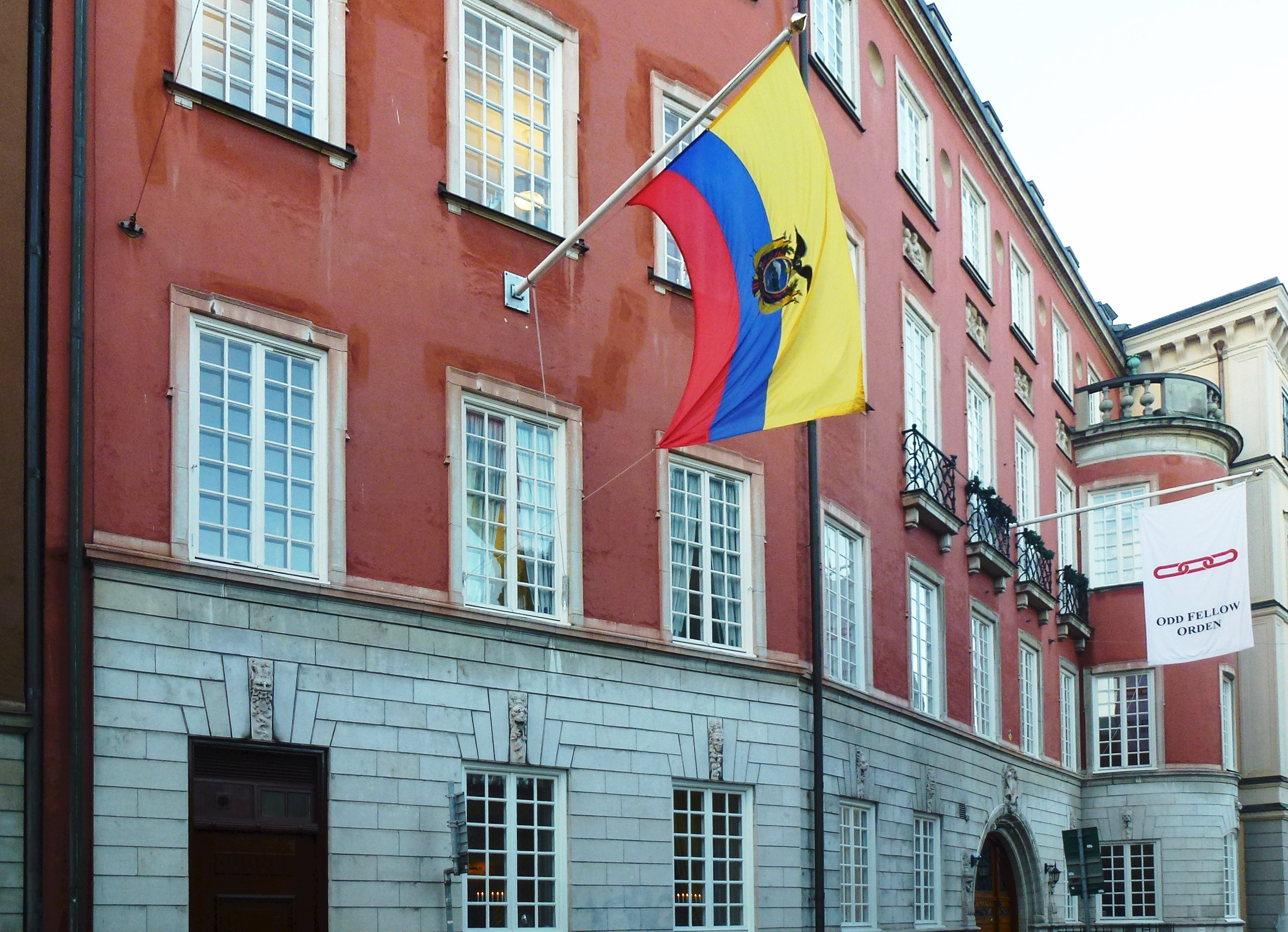
Embassy in Stockholm

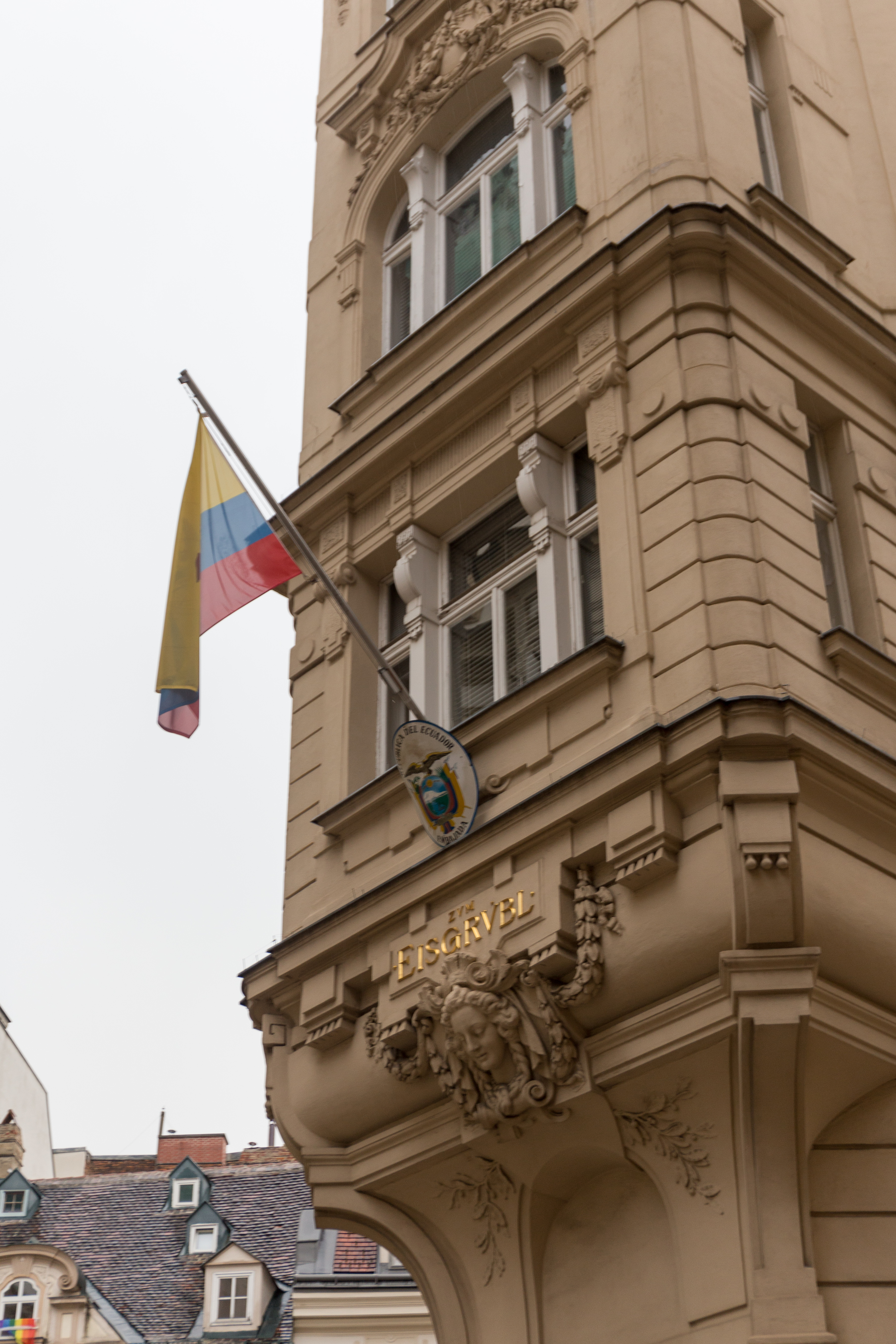
Embassy in Vienna

=== Oceania ===
Host country	Host city	Mission	Concurrent accreditation	Ref.
Australia	Canberra	Embassy	Country: New Zealand	

=== Multilateral organizations ===
Organization	Host city	Host country	Mission	Concurrent accreditation	Ref.
Organization of American States	Washington, D.C.	United States	Permanent Mission		
United Nations	New York City	United States	Permanent Mission		
United Nations	Geneva	Switzerland	Permanent Mission		
UNESCO	Paris	France	Permanent Mission		

== Closed missions ==
=== Africa ===
Host country	Host city	Mission	Year closed	Ref.
Algeria	Algiers	Embassy	2019	
Angola	Luanda	Embassy (Note: Resident in Pretoria, Gauteng, South Africa)	2019	
Ethiopia	Addis Ababa	Embassy	2019	
Libya	Tripoli	Embassy	2011	
Nigeria	Abuja	Embassy	2019	

=== Americas ===
Host country	Host city	Mission	Year closed	Ref.
Colombia	Cali	Consulate	2013	
Colombia	Puerto Asís	Consulate	2013	
Cuba	Havana	Embassy	2026	
Mexico	Mexico City	Embassy (Note: Continues as an interest section.)	2024	
Mexico	Guadalajara	Consulate	2013	
Mexico	Monterrey	Consulate	2024	
Mexico	Tapachula	Consulate	2020	
Nicaragua	Managua	Embassy	2020	
Peru	Piura	Consulate	2013	
Venezuela	Caracas	Embassy	2024	
Venezuela	Mérida	Consulate General	2014	
Venezuela	Valencia	Consulate	2020	

=== Asia ===
Host country	Host city	Mission	Year closed	Ref.
India	Mumbai	Consulate	2019	
Iran	Tehran	Embassy	2020	
Malaysia	Kuala Lumpur	Embassy	2020	
Singapore	Singapore	Embassy (Note: Resident in Jakarta, Daerah Khusus Ibukota, Indonesia)	2014	

=== Europe ===
Host country	Host city	Mission	Year closed	Ref.
Belarus	Minsk	Embassy (Note: Resident in Moscow, Russia)	2019	
Poland	Warsaw	Embassy (Note: Resident in Vienna, Austria)	2014	
Portugal	Lisbon	Embassy (Note: Resident in London, England, United Kingdom)	2014	
Romania	Bucharest	Embassy (Note: Resident in Budapest, Hungary)	1999	
Spain	Alicante	Consulate	2018	
Spain	Pamplona	Consulate	2013	

=== Multilateral organizations ===
Organization	Host city	Host country	Mission	Year closed	Ref.
International Civil Aviation Organization	Montreal	Canada	Delegation	2020	
Andean Parliament	Bogotá	Colombia	Delegation	2020	

== See also ==
- Foreign relations of Ecuador
- List of diplomatic missions in Ecuador
- Visa policy of Ecuador
