= Miss World 1984 =

Beauty pageant edition

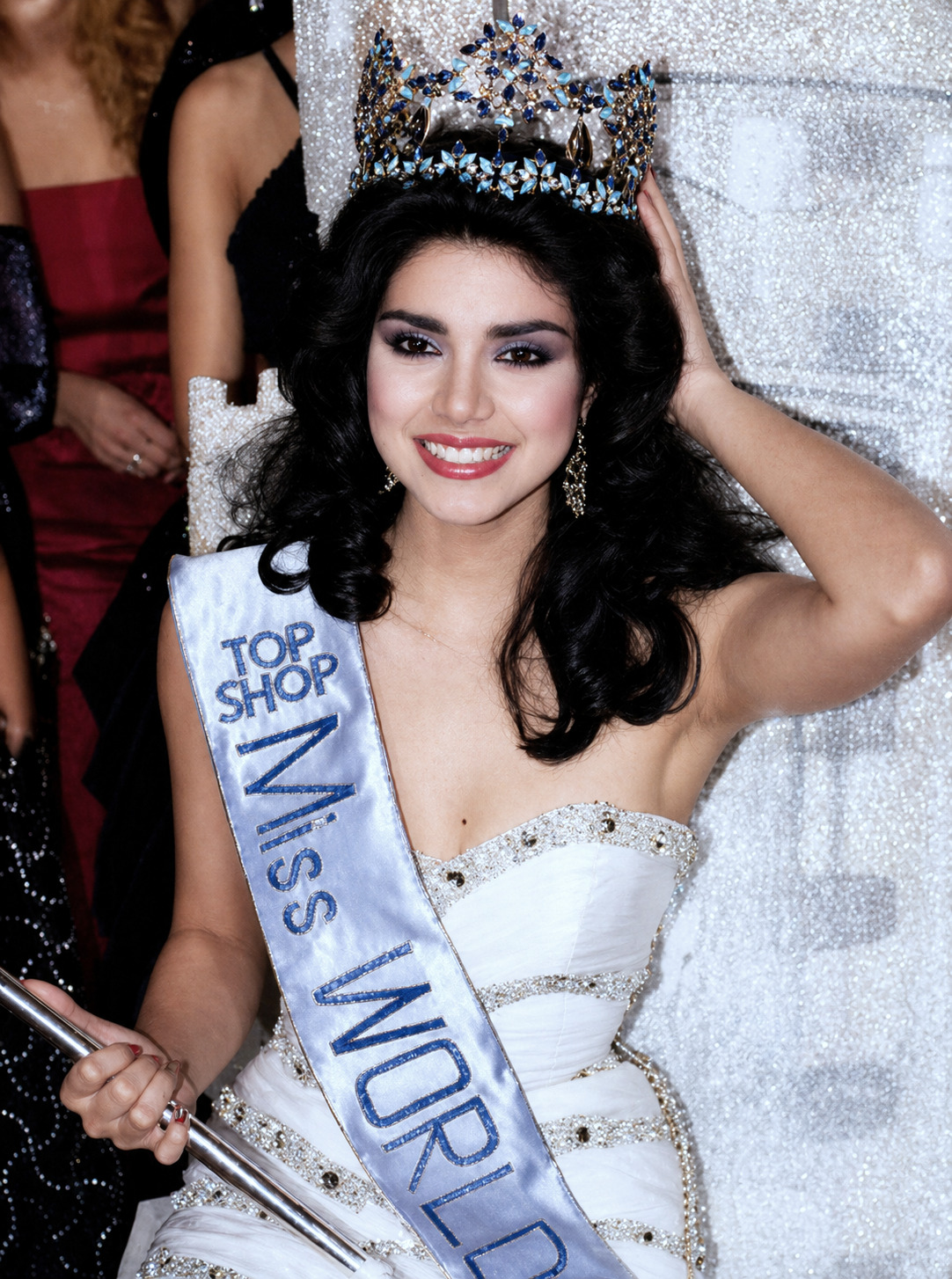
- Date: 15 November 1984
- Presenters: Peter Marshall; Judith Chalmers
- Entertainment: The Drifters
- Venue: Royal Albert Hall, London, United Kingdom
- Broadcaster: Thames Television
- Entrants: 72
- Placements: 15
- Withdrawals: Indonesia; Liberia; Tonga; Turkey
- Returns: French Polynesia; Kenya; Nigeria; Sri Lanka
- Winner: Astrid Carolina Herrera; Venezuela

Miss World 1984, the 34th edition of the Miss World pageant, was held on 15 November 1984 at the Royal Albert Hall in London, United Kingdom.

The winner was Astrid Carolina Herrera from Venezuela and was crowned Miss World 1984 by the previous winner, Sarah-Jane Hutt of the United Kingdom. The 1st and 2nd runners-up were Constance "Connie" Fitzpatrick from Canada, and Lou-Anne Ronchi from Australia. The event was viewed by 17.1 million people in the United Kingdom. It is the third victory of Venezuela in the pageant, after in 1955 and in 1981.

This edition marked the return of Kenya, which last competed in 1968, Nigeria last competed in 1979, French Polynesia (as Tahiti) and Sri Lanka last competed in 1982. Indonesia, Liberia, Tonga, Turkey, withdrew from the competition for unknown reasons.

== Results ==
=== Placements ===
Placement	Contestant
Miss World 1984	Venezuela – Astrid Carolina Herrera
1st Runner-Up	Canada – Connie Fitzpatrick
2nd Runner-Up	Australia – Lou-Anne Ronchi
Top 7	Brazil – Adriana Alves de Oliveira; Ireland – Olivia Tracey; United Kingdom – Vivienne Rooke; United States – Kelly Lea Anderson
Top 15	Austria – Heidemarie Pilgerstorfer; Colombia – Patricia Janiot; Finland – Anna-Liisa Tilus; Holland – Nancy Neede; Iceland – Berglind Johansen; Israel – Iris Louk; Kenya – Khadija Ismail; Switzerland – Silvia Affolter

=== Continental Queens of Beauty ===
Continental Group	Contestant
Africa	Kenya – Khadija Adam Ismail
Americas	Venezuela – Astrid Carolina Herrera
Asia	Israel – Iris Louk
Europe	United Kingdom – Vivienne Rooke
Oceania	Australia – Lou-Anne Ronchi

== Contestants ==
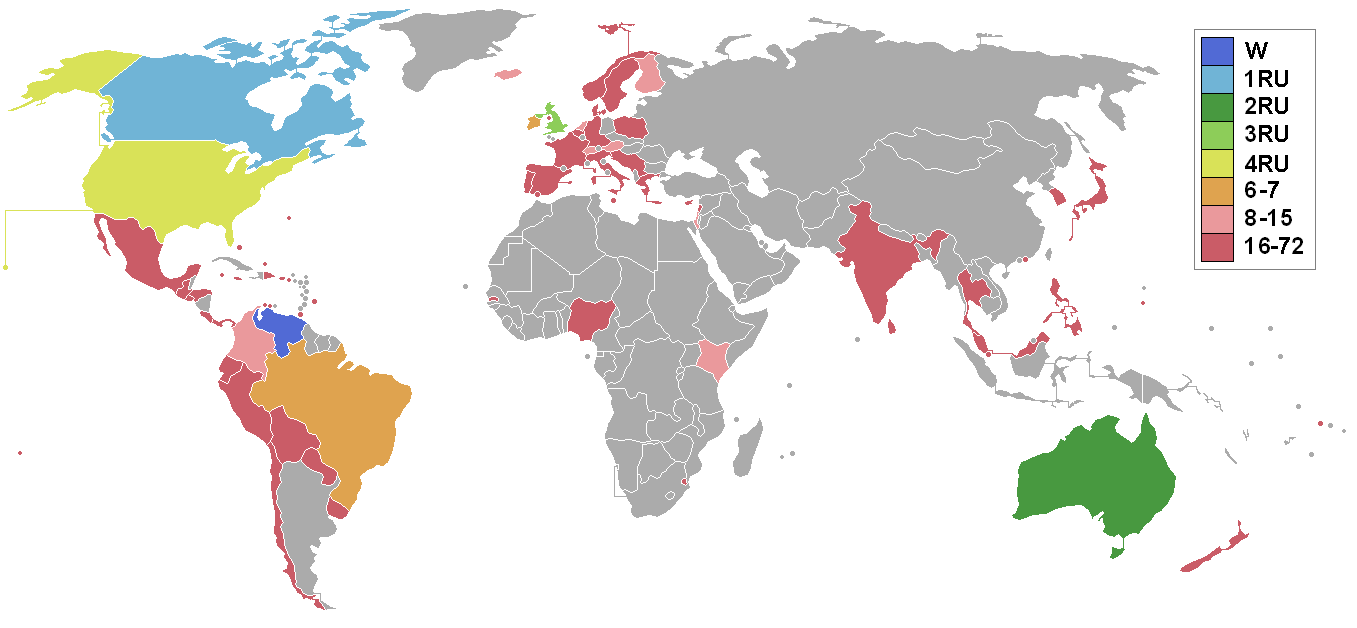
Miss World 1984 participating countries and territories

72 contestants competed for the title.

Country	Contestant	Age (Note: Ages at the time of the pageant)	Hometown
Aruba	Margaret Bislick	22	Oranjestad
Australia	Lou-Anne Ronchi	22	Perth
Austria	Heidemarie Pilgerstorfer	23	Linz
(The Bahamas) Bahamas	Yvette Rolle	20	Nassau
Barbados	Gale Thomas	22	Christ Church
Belgium	Brigitte Muyshondt	24	Antwerp
Bermuda	Rhonda Wilkinson	21	St. Georges
Bolivia	Erika Weise	21	Santa Cruz
Brazil	Adriana Alves de Oliveira	21	Rio Grande
Canada	Constance "Connie" Fitzpatrick	20	Hamilton
Cayman Islands	Thora Ann Crighton	22	George Town
Chile	María Soledad García	21	Santiago
Colombia	Patricia Janiot	20	Bucaramanga
Costa Rica	Catalina Blum	21	San Jose
Curaçao	Ivette Atacho	20	Willemstad
Cyprus	Agathi Demetriou	17	Paphos
Denmark	Pia Melchiorsen	18	Frederikshavn
Dominican Republic	Mayelinne de Lara	20	El Seibo
Ecuador	María Sol Corral	19	Quito
El Salvador	Celina María López	17	San Salvador
Finland	Anna-Liisa Tilus	19	Helsinki
France	Martine Robine	19	Cabourg
French Polynesia (Note: Competed as Tahiti in the pageant)	Hinarii Kilian	17	Punaauia
(The Gambia) Gambia	Mirabelle Carayol	19	Banjul
Gibraltar	Karina Hollands	18	Gibraltar
Greece	Vassiliki Barba	18	Athens
Guam	Janet Clymer	20	Mangilao
Guatemala	Carla Aldana	22	Guatemala City
(Netherlands) Holland	Nancy Neede	20	Amsterdam
Honduras	Myrtice Hyde	22	Roatan
(British Hong Kong) Hong Kong	Joan Tong	20	Hong Kong Island
Iceland	Berglind Johansen	18	Reykjavík
India	Suchita Kumar	19	Bombay
(Republic of Ireland) Ireland	Olivia Tracey	24	Dublin
Isle of Man	Jill Armstrong	17	Braddan
Israel	Iris Louk	18	Rishon LeZion
Italy	Federica Tersch	20	Milan
Jamaica	Jacqueline Crichton	20	Kingston
Japan	Ayako Ohsone	21	Tokyo
Kenya	Khadija Ismail	24	Nairobi
Lebanon	Elaine Khoury	19	Beirut
Malaysia	Christine Teo	22	Kuala Lumpur
Malta	Graziella Previ	19	Gzira
Mexico	Mariana Urrea	19	Guadalajara
New Zealand	Barbara McDowell	19	Auckland
Nigeria	Cynthia Oronsaye	20	Lagos
Norway	Ingrid Martens	19	Oslo
Panama	Ana Luisa Seda	18	Panama City
Paraguay	Susana Ivasiuten	17	Encarnación
Peru	Gloria Loayza-Guerra	21	Trujillo
Philippines	Aurora Sevilla	21	Manila
(Polish People's Republic) Poland	Magdalena Jaworska	23	Warsaw
Portugal	Maria Leonor Mendes Correia	22	Lisbon
Puerto Rico	María de los Ángeles Rosas	23	San Juan
Singapore	Jenny Li	22	Singapore
South Korea (Note: Competed as Korea in the pageant)	Lee Joo-hee	18	Seoul
Spain	Juncal Rivero	18	Valladolid
Sri Lanka	Bhagya Gunasinghe	22	Colombo
(Eswatini) Swaziland	Busie Motsa	19	Manzini
Sweden	Brigitte Gunnarsson	21	Malmö
Switzerland	Silvia Anna Affolter	20	Sarnen
Thailand	Intira Imsompoh	19	Bangkok
Trinidad and Tobago	Ria Rambardan	17	Tunapuna
Turks and Caicos Islands	Miriam Coralita Adams	18	Grand Turk
United Kingdom	Vivienne Rooke	22	Bristol
United States	Kelly Anderson	23	Clarksburg
United States Virgin Islands	Sandy Lewis	19	St. Croix
Uruguay	Giselle Barthou	23	Montevideo
Venezuela	Astrid Carolina Herrera	21	Caracas
West Germany	Brigitta Berx	22	Düsseldorf
Western Samoa	Ana Bentley	22	Apia
(Socialist Federal Republic of Yugoslavia) Yugoslavia	Dinka Delić	18	Zenica
