= List of Miss World Malaysia titleholders =

This is a list of women who have won the Miss World Malaysia beauty pageant.

== Titleholders ==
Year	Titleholder	Age (Note: Ages at the time of Miss World Malaysia pageant.)	Represented	Placement at Miss World
1963	Catherine Loh	19	Brunei	Top 14
1964	Leonie Foo Saw Pheng	18	Perak	
1965	Clara Eunice de Run	20	Selangor	
1966	Merlyn Therese McKelvie	18	Selangor	
1967	Rosenelly Abu Bakar	19	Selangor	
1968	Ramlah Alang	22	Terengganu	
1970	Mary Ann Wong Keat Choon	21	Pahang	
1971	Daphne Munro	24	Selangor	
1972	Janet Mok Swee Chin	21	Johor	
1973	Majorie Ann Hon	19	Kuala Lumpur	
1974	Shirley Tan	21	Johor	
1975	Fauziah Haron	19	Johor	
1976	Che Puteh Che Naziadin	21	Terengganu	
1977	Christine Mary Lim Kim Boey	17	Penang	
1978	Ngafimah Kartina Osir	22	Sabah	
1979	Shirley Bernaddine Chew	18	Perlis	Top 15
1980	Callie Liew Tan Chee	23	Pahang	
1981	Cynthia Geraldine de Castro	20	Selangor	
1982	Nellie Teoh Swee Yong	25	Kuala Lumpur	
1983	Michelle Yeoh Choo Kheng	21	Perak	
1984	Christina Teo Pick Yoon	22	Kuala Lumpur	
1985	Rosalind Kong Siew Kuen	21	Perak	
1986	Joan Martha Cordoza	22	Malacca	
1987	Sheila Shankar	23	Kuala Lumpur	
1988	Sue Choy Fun Wong	19	Penang	
1989	Vivien Shee Yee Chen	24	Sarawak	
1991	Samantha Schubert †	22	Kuala Lumpur	
1992	Fazira Wan Chek	18	Selangor	
1993	Jacqueline Ngu	23	Sarawak	
1994	Rahima Orchient Yayah	21	Sabah	Top 10
1995	Trincy Low Ee Bing	19	Penang	
1996	Qu-An How Cheok Kuan	20	Selangor	
1997	Arianna Teoh Lai Poh	24	Penang	Top 10
1998	Lina Teoh Pick Lim	22	Malacca	2nd Runner-up
1999	Jaclyn Lee Tze Wey	24	Kedah	
2000	Tan Su Wei	24	Malacca	
2001	Sasha Tan Hwee Teng	24	Johor	
2002	Mabel Ng Chin Mei	24	Penang	
2003	Sze Zen Wong	23	Pahang	
2004	Gloria Ting Mei Ru	22	Sarawak	
2005	Emmeline Ng Wei Shu	23	Kuala Lumpur	
2006	Adeline Choo Wan Ling	23	Johor	
2007	Deborah Priya Henry	21	Kuala Lumpur	Top 15
2008	Wincci Soo	23	Selangor	
2009	Thanuja Ananthan	23	Kuala Lumpur	
2010	Nadia Min Dern Heng	25	Negeri Sembilan	
2011	Chloe Chen Tien Nee	21	Kuala Lumpur	
2012	Yvonne Lee	23	Selangor	
2013	Melinder Kaur Bhullar	21	Selangor	
2014	Dewi Liana Seriestha	25	Sarawak	Top 25
2015	Brynn Zalina Lovett	22	Sabah	
2016	Tatiana Nandha Kumar	18	Kuala Lumpur	
2018	Larissa Ping Liew	19	Sarawak	Top 30
2019	Alexis SueAnn Seow Su Yin	24	Selangor	Top 40
2021	Lavanya Sivaji	25	Selangor	Top 40
2023	Wenanita Wences Angang	26	Sabah	Top 40
2025	Saroopdeep Kaur Bhatt	24	Perak	Top 40
2026	Taanusiya Chetty Veerapandian	24	Kuala Lumpur	2nd Runner-up

== List of Runners-up ==
Year	Winner (1st Place)	1st Runner–Up (2nd Place)	2nd Runner–Up (3rd Place)	3rd Runner–Up (4th Place)	4th Runner–Up (5th Place)	5th Runner–Up (6th Place)
1963	Catherine Loh; Brunei	Ann Woodford; Singapore	Alice Woon; Singapore	Not awarded from 1963 – 1976		
1964	Leonie Foo; Perak	Habsah Hamdan; Sarawak	Rohani Salleh; Kelantan	Not awarded from 1963 – 1976		
1965	Clara de Run; Selangor	Theresa Van Dort; Singapore	Shirley Wong; Pahang	Not awarded from 1963 – 1976		
1966	Merlyn McKelvie; Selangor	Maheran Mokhtar; Kedah	Fauziah Nuruddin; Pahang	Not awarded from 1963 – 1976		
1967	Rosenelly Abu Bakar; Selangor	Linda Atkinson	Yap Moy Yin	Not awarded from 1963 – 1976		
1968	Ramlah Alang; Terengganu	Normah Ali	Ainun Yaakub	Not awarded from 1963 – 1976		
1970	Mary Ann Wong; Pahang	Anita Galleyot; Melaka	Zabedah Yusof; Selangor	Not awarded from 1963 – 1976		
1971	Daphne Munro; Selangor	Jean Perera †; Negeri Sembilan	Katherine Tan; Johor	Not awarded from 1963 – 1976		
1972	Janet Mok; Johor	Catherine da Silva; Perak	Mia Blassan; Sarawak	Not awarded from 1963 – 1976		
1973	Marjorie Hon; Melaka	Narimah Yusoff; Perak	Marleng Shawn; Sarawak	Not awarded from 1963 – 1976		
1974	Shirley Tan; Johor	Diana Hartley; Sabah	Tanee Yap; Pahang	Not awarded from 1963 – 1976		
1975	Fauziah Haron; Johor	Jennifer Rabel; Selangor	Lisa Othman; Terengganu	Not awarded from 1963 – 1976		
1977	Christine Mary Lim; Penang	Norani Yaacob; Perak	Laura Yap †; Pahang	Shahnon Ahmed; Kelantan	Pamela Ooi; Penang	
1978	Kartina Osir; Sabah	Farida Abdul Samad; Selangor	Susie Yap	Not awarded from 1978 – 1981		
1979	Shirley Chew; Kuala Lumpur	Jill Heng; Sarawak	Jacintha Lee; Negeri Sembilan	Not awarded from 1978 – 1981		
1980	Callie Liew; Pahang	Christina Leong; Johor	Zainab Merican; Kedah	Not awarded from 1978 – 1981		
1981	Cynthia de Castro; Selangor	Jenny Hon; Negeri Sembilan	Karen Chan; Penang	Not awarded from 1978 – 1981		
1982	Nellie Teoh; Kuala Lumpur	Helen Peters; Penang	Jeannette Kim; Sarawak	Phyllis Lim; Kelantan	Sharinah Samsuddin; Kuala Lumpur	
1983	Michelle Yeoh; Perak	Dotty Kamaluddin; Pahang	Jennifer Yong; Sarawak	Not awarded from 1983 – 1984		
1984	Christina Teo; Selangor	Christine Saw; Kuala Lumpur	Lim Shuh Ting; Johor	Not awarded from 1983 – 1984		
1985	Rosalind Kong; Perak	Latonia Chang; Kuala Lumpur	Penny Ong; Pahang	Martha de Silva; Selangor	Not awarded from 1985 – 2012	
1987	Sheila Shankar; Kuala Lumpur	Maljeet Kaur; Negeri Sembilan	Catherine Lai; Sarawak	Cindy Leong; Terengganu	Not awarded from 1985 – 2012	
1988	Sue Wong; Pahang	Didi Liu; Sabah	Veronica Shockman; Kuala Lumpur	Riguan Rashidi; Perak	Not awarded from 1985 – 2012	
1989	Vivien Chen; Sarawak	Tengku Roslinda; Selangor	Thum Pei Ling; Penang	Lena Tan; Negeri Sembilan	Not awarded from 1985 – 2012	
1991	Samantha Schubert; Kuala Lumpur	Tonia Wee; Sarawak	Haznina Haniff; Kuala Lumpur	Suji Thomas; Sabah	Not awarded from 1985 – 2012	
1992	Fazira Wan Chek; Kuala Lumpur	Jojo Tan; Johor	Cecelia Lim; Johor	Cynthia Ong; Penang	Not awarded from 1985 – 2012	
1993	Jacqueline Ngu; Sarawak	Vanidah Imran; Kuala Lumpur	Chew Sing Ying; Kedah	Jossener Teh; Penang	Not awarded from 1985 – 2012	
1994	Rahima Yayah; Sabah	Vanaja Subramaniam; Johor	Margarita Donaghey; Kuala Lumpur	(Unknown)	Not awarded from 1985 – 2012	
1995	Trincy Low; Penang	Challene Ng; Kuala Lumpur	Deffany Sevelan; Sabah	(Unknown)	Not awarded from 1985 – 2012	
1997	Arianna Teoh; Penang	Lavinia Tan; Selangor	Priscilla Wong; Melaka	Cinthy Yih Yee; Sarawak	Not awarded from 1985 – 2012	
1999	Jaclyn Lee; Selangor	Elaine Daly; Kuala Lumpur	Kiran Velayutham; Melaka	Wendy Quek; Perak	Not awarded from 1985 – 2012	
2000	Su Wei Tan; Melaka	Andrea Gomez; Perak	Shaleen Cheah; Melaka	(Unknown)	Not awarded from 1985 – 2012	
2001	Sasha Tan; Johor	Mandy Ng; Selangor	Adele Lim; Kuala Lumpur	(Unknown)	Not awarded from 1985 – 2012	
2002	Mabel Ng; Penang	Audrey Chong; Sabah	Michelle Hon; Kuala Lumpur	Dennapa Ung; Selangor	Not awarded from 1985 – 2012	
2003	Sze Zen Wong; Pahang	Alexis Leong; Johor	Sharon Liew; Sabah	Chelsia Ng; Penang	Not awarded from 1985 – 2012	
2004	Gloria Ting; Sarawak	Pang Su Len; Selangor	Parveen Kaur; Kuala Lumpur	Sophie Lim; Sabah	Not awarded from 1985 – 2012	
2005	Emmeline Ng; Kuala Lumpur	Natassia Tan	Rachel Looi	Allison Tay	Not awarded from 1985 – 2012	
2006	Adeline Choo; Johor	Cassandra Patrick; Kuala Lumpur	Stephanie Mak	Sim Van Ren	Not awarded from 1985 – 2012	
2007	Deborah Henry; Kuala Lumpur	Dawn Jeremiah; Penang	Jacqueline Ong	Mae Lee	Not awarded from 1985 – 2012	
2008	Soo Wincci; Selangor	Cindy Chen	Shereen Kaur; Kuala Lumpur	Not awarded from 2008 – 2012		
2009	Thanuja Ananthan; Kuala Lumpur	Stephanie Chua; Penang	Christy Yeoh; Perak	Not awarded from 2008 – 2012		
2011	Chloe Chen; Kuala Lumpur	Pamela Tan; Melaka	Chua Yee See; Pahang	Not awarded from 2008 – 2012		
2012	Lee Yvonne; Selangor	Vera Chang; Kuala Lumpur	Jocelyn Leong; Kuala Lumpur	Not awarded from 2008 – 2012		
2013	Melinder Bhullar; Kuala Lumpur	L'oreal Mok; Kuala Lumpur	Tanisha Demour; Kuala Lumpur	Rubini Sambanthan; Selangor	Kim Low; Kuala Lumpur	
2014	Dewi Liana; Sarawak	Bob Low; Putrajaya	Cassandra Jeremiah; Sabah	Dhivya Dhyana; Kuala Lumpur	Olivia Shyan; Kuala Lumpur	
2015	Brynn Lovett; Sabah	Serene Chai; Johor	Melinda Lee; Penang	Catherine Chow; Perak	Natalia Benggon; Sabah	
2016	Tatiana Kumar; Kuala Lumpur	Ranmeet Jassal; Selangor	Shweta Sekhon; Kuala Lumpur	Jessica Lim; Selangor	Francisca Luhong; Sarawak	
2018	Larissa Ping; Sarawak	Shannen Totten; Selangor	Naomi Sim; Sarawak	Not awarded from 2018 – 2019		
2019	Alexis SueAnn; Selangor	Juliana Sambai Sibat; Sarawak	Melissa Jespoh Raj; Selangor	Not awarded from 2018 – 2019		
2021	Lavanya Sivaji; Selangor	Anya Kimberly Kow; Sabah	Charissa Chong; Selangor	Menaka Kathiresan; Johor	Natalie Ang; Penang	Crystal Tung; Penang
2022	Wenanita Angang; Sabah	Evelyn Ting; Sarawak	Anya Kimberly Kow; Sabah	Not awarded in 2022		
2023	Saroop Roshi; Perak	Natalie Ang; Penang	Shu Wen Chai; Sabah	Vaishnavi Shivakumar; Selangor	Ellesha Meschille; Sabah	Adlyn Andrew; Selangor
2024	Taanusiya Chetty; Kuala Lumpur	Kelly Eleanor Tseu; Sabah	Hantze Liow; Kuala Lumpur	Not awarded in 2024		

== Trivia ==
=== National Directors ===
1. Mr. Paul Lee
2. Datuk Vincent Lee
3. Dato Anna Lin Mei Yoke (2013–2016)
4. Dr. Sean Wong (2018–present)

=== Franchise Holder ===
1. Far East Beauty Congress / Miss Orient Pte. Ltd. (1963–1989)
2. Naga DDB Needham Dik
3. Meridian Surf Sdn. Bhd. (2013–2016)
4. Fantastic Golden Sdn. Bhd. (2018–present)

=== Board of directors ===
1. Tan Sri V. Jeyaratnam – President of Far East Beauty Congress
2. Mr. Paul Lee – Executive Director of Far East Beauty Congress
3. Mr. Sunny Hoh – Executive Producer of Far East Beauty Congress
4. Mrs. Ruth Heng – Executive Producer of Far East Beauty Congress (1968–1969)
5. Mr. Eric Goh (2018–present) as Managing Director
6. Mr. Arnold Vegafria (2018–present) as Talent Manager

=== Name Changes ===
1. Miss Malaysia (1963–1964)
2. Miss Malaysia/World (1965–1989)
3. Miss Malaysia World (1991–2007; 2013–2016)
4. Miss World Malaysia (2008–2012; 2018–present)
