= Miss Malaysia =

National beauty pageant

Miss Malaysia is a national beauty pageant in Malaysia.

== Notable winners of Miss Malaysia ==
- Tengku Zanariah Tengku Ahmad (Miss International Malaya 1960) – Raja Permaisuri Agong of Malaysia from 1984 to 1989.
- Yasmin Yusoff (Miss Universe Malaysia 1978) – veteran actress, singer, radio presenter, former model
- Michelle Yeoh (Miss World Malaysia 1983) – international actress
- Fazira Wan Chek (Miss World Malaysia 1992) – actress, singer, TV host, businesswoman, model
- Rahima Orchient Yayah (Miss World Malaysia 1994) – businesswoman, former model
- Soo Wincci (Miss World Malaysia 2008) – actress, singer, model
- Thanuja Ananthan (Miss World Malaysia 2009) – model, TV host, actress, humanitarian activist
- Deborah Henry (Miss Universe Malaysia 2011) – motivational speaker, TV host, humanitarian activist, former model
- Rubini Sambanthan (Miss International Malaysia 2014) – model, actress
- Dewi Liana Seriestha (Miss World Malaysia 2014) – won Miss World Talent award in Miss World 2014 which then making her the first woman from Malaysia to receive the special award.
- Alexis Sue-Ann Seow (Miss World Malaysia 2019) – model, emcee, fashion blogger
- Francisca Luhong James (Miss Universe Malaysia 2020) – the first indigenous woman to win the title of Miss Universe Malaysia.
- Nisha Thayananthan (Miss Earth Malaysia 2021) – full-time doctor, part time model
- Lavanya Sivaji (Miss World Malaysia 2021) – full-time doctor, model

== Miss Malaya ==
Before Malaysia was formed, Malaysian representatives represented the whole nation with a title of "Miss Malaya".

Color keys

- : Declared as Winner
- : Ended as runner-up or top 5/6 qualification
- : Ended as one of the finalists or semifinalists
- : Ended as special awards winner

=== Miss Malaya Universe ===
Year	Representative's Name	Hometown	Placement	Special Awards	Ref
1962	Sarah Alhabshee Abdullah	Kuala Lumpur	Unplaced		
1963	Nik Azizah Nik Yahya	Kelantan	did not compete		

=== Miss Malaya International ===
Year	Representative's Name	Hometown	Placement	Special Awards	Ref
1960	Zanariah Zena Ahmad	Kelantan	Unplaced		
1961	Helen Tan Hong Lean	Kuala Lumpur	Top 15		
1962	Brenda Maureen Alvisse	Penang	Unplaced		
1963	Jasmin Mariam Idris	Kuala Lumpur	did not compete		

== Titleholders at Big Four pageants ==
Malaysia has been represented in the Big Four international beauty pageants since 1960. These are Miss World, Miss Universe, Miss International and Miss Earth.

== Dewi Malaysia ==
=== Representative to Miss Planet International ===
Year	Representative's Name	Hometown	Placement	Special Awards	Ref
2022	Nur Syafiqah Ibrahim	Kuala Lumpur	TBD	TBD	
2020	Nur Aishah Nordin	Selangor			
2019	Viviana Lin Winston	Kuching	2nd Runner-Up		
2018	Brenie Sea	Kuala Lumpur			
2016	Wenanita Wences Angang	Kuala Penyu	1st Runner-up	Best in National Costume	
2015	Cheryl Joanne Chan Fan Nyuk	Kota Kinabalu			

== Miss Supranational ==
Year	Representative's Name	Hometown	Placement	Special Awards	Ref
2024	TBA	TBA	TBA		
2023	Deidre Ann Walker	Kota Kinabalu	Top 24		
2022	Melisha Lin	Gombak	Top 24		
2018	Sanjna Suri	Kuala Lumpur	Top 25		
2016	Julylen Liew Ei Ling	Kota Kinabalu	Unplaced		
2015	Tanisha Demour	Kuala Lumpur	Top 10	Top 3 - Best National Costume; Top 10 - Best Body	
2014	Audrey Loke Pui Yan	Selangor	Unplaced	Best Smile	
2013	Nancy Marcus	Kuala Lumpur	Unplaced	Miss Talent	

== Miss Grand Malaysia ==
Color keys

- : Declared as Winner
- : Ended as runner-up or top 5/6 qualification
- : Ended as one of the finalists or semifinalists
- : Ended as special awards winner

=== Representative to Miss Grand International ===
Year	Representative's Name	Hometown	Placement	Special Awards	Ref
2021	Lishalliny Karanan	Shah Alam	Top 20	Best National Costume; Lottery Prizes Event; 2nd Place - Miss Popular Vote; Top 20 - Best in Swimsuit; Top 20 - Pre-Arrival	
2020	Jasebel Robert	Kuala Lumpur	Top 10	Miss Popular Vote; Top 10 - Best National Costume; Top 25 - How to get to know you in 1 minute	
2019	Mel Dequanne Abar	Kota Kinabalu	Unplaced	2nd Place – Miss Popular Vote; Top 10 – Best in Swimsuit; Top 10 – Best National Costume; Top 10 – Pre-Arrival; Top 21 – Fashion Show	
2018	Debra Jeanne Poh	Labuan	Unplaced	Top 5 - Miss Popular Vote; Top 10 – Best National Costume	
2017	Sanjeda John	Kota Kinabalu	Unplaced	Top 5 – Miss Popular Vote; Top 20 – Best National Costume	
2016	Ranmeet Jassal	Subang Jaya	Top 20	Top 10 – Miss Popular Vote; Top 10 – Best National Costume	
2015	Santhawan Boonratana	Kelantan	Unplaced	Top 3 – Miss Popular Vote; Top 20 – Best National Costume	
2014	Jane Koo	Penang	Unplaced	Top 20 – Best National Costume	
2013	Michelle Madeleine Moey	Penang	Unplaced	Top 20 – Best in Swimsuit	

=== Representative to The Miss Globe ===
In 2017, the first runner-up was sent to Miss Intercontinental pageant. In 2018 and 2019, the runners-up were unable to compete at international level due to lack of sponsorship. Started from 2021, the first runner-up of Miss Grand Malaysia pageant will be sent to The Miss Globe pageant.

Year	Representative's Name	Hometown	Placement	Special Awards	Ref
2023	Manvin Khera	Kuala Lumpur	The Miss Globe 2023	Miss Talent	
2022	Sarah Cynthia	Kuala Lumpur	Unplaced		
2021	Malveen Kaur Gill	Senai	Top 15	Head to Head Challenge	
2019	Saroopdeep Bath	Ipoh	did not compete		
2018	Kate Avella Cantwell	Papar	did not compete		

=== Representative to Miss Intercontinental ===
Since 2018, the second runner-up of Miss Grand Malaysia pageant will compete Miss Intercontinental pageant.

Year	Representative's Name	Hometown	Placement	Special Awards	Ref
2022	Jeevasheni Anang Kodiappan	Kuala Lumpur	TBA	TBA	
2021	Poorani Rajoo	Kuala Lumpur	Top 20		
2019	Haaraneei Muthu Kumar	Selangor	Unplaced		
2018	Scarlett Megan Liew	Penampang	Top 20		
2017	Sanjna Suri	Ipoh	Top 18		
2014	Nicole Bungan Langdon-Down	Miri	Unplaced		
2013	Julies Lucas	Miri	Unplaced		
2005	Yuki Koay Lee Chuen	Kuala Lumpur	Unplaced		
2004	Soo Wincci	Selangor	Unplaced		
2003	not available	Kuala Lumpur	Unplaced		
2002	Anya Lim Chai Ying	Kuala Lumpur	Unplaced		
2000	Surita Lim Mei Sinn	Kuala Lumpur	Unplaced		
1984-1998 (incomplete or no data)					
1977	N.A.				

== Miss Malaysia Tourism Pageant ==
PAGEANT’S BACKGROUND

D’Touch International Sdn. Bhd., a name synonymous in the beauty pageant industry both locally and internationally, started way back in 1989. To date, D’Touch has successfully organized more than 55 Miss Malaysia Finals and 47 International Beauty Pageant World Finals.

Since the company’s inception in 1990, D’Touch International has crowned 118 Miss Malaysia Winners and 150 World title-holders. This record has propelled D’Touch International as the leading Pageant Producer in the world.

D’Touch International is also the Franchisor of 6 International Pageant Titles such as Miss Tourism International, Miss Tourism Queen of the Year International, Miss Tourism Metropolitan International, Miss Tourism Global, Miss Tourism Cosmopolitan International and Miss Chinese World. These Pageant Titles are now franchised to more than 80 countries worldwide.

D’Touch International Sdn. Bhd. is a fully fledged event management and promotion company. It is helmed by Tan Sri Datuk Danny Ooi, the President & Franchise owner, a fellow Malaysian who dared to dream the great, and envisioned putting Malaysia on the world map.

Color keys

- : Declared as Winner
- : Ended as runner-up or top 5/6 qualification
- : Ended as one of the finalists or semifinalists
- : Ended as special awards winner

Year	Miss Malaysia Tourism Pageant Elemental Court Titlists		
Year	Miss Malaysia Tourism	Miss Malaysia Tourism Queen Of The Year	Miss Malaysia Tourism Metropolitan
2024	Mathi Malarchelvi	Wynwie Hilston Lai	Alysha De Cruz
2023	Jen Cheang Shi Hui	Joanne Clare Deaves	Shelyn Poh
2022	Phoebe Ong Yi Huui	Anita Mae Loh Swee Ying	Ellen Rachel
2021	How Zo Ee	Rachel Tee Hsu Xin	Yoong Jia Yi
2020			
2019	Cheryl Loo Wen Nee	Not awarded	Not awarded
2018	Caenne Ng	Not awarded	Not awarded
2017	Melissa Ng	Lee Jia Ling	Crystal Tung
2016	Ng Shin Ying	Thalia Thin	Tiong Li San

Year	Miss Malaysia Tourism Pageant Elemental Court Titlists				
Year	Miss Malaysia Tourism	Miss Malaysia Tourism Queen Of The Year	Miss Malaysia Tourism Metropolitan	Miss Malaysia Tourism Global	Miss Malaysia Chinese
2015	Xandria Ban	Rishon Shun	Elaine Chong	Janet Fabian	Not awarded
2014	Ranjani Rajamanickam	Shirley Hew	Joey Ong Ai Ee	Not awarded	Not awarded
2013	Thaarah Ganesan	Not awarded	Not awarded	Not awarded	Not awarded
2012	Yong Wan Jun	Yen Wai Yee	Not awarded	Not awarded	Not awarded
2011	Aileen Gabriella Robinson	Eugenee Ooi	Jennifer Yap	Ilinca Tan	Low Lai Kim
2010	Gabriella Ashley Boudulle	Not awarded	Not awarded	Not awarded	Not awarded
2009	Not awarded	Subathra Jeyabalan	Yvonne Lee	Weena Marcus	Not awarded
2008	Angela Ching	Yuanie Kung	Angelreena Lim	Not awarded	Not awarded
2007	Joann Chan Suit Yee	Not awarded	Not awarded	Not awarded	Not awarded
2005	Not awarded	Gurdev Kaur	Not awarded	Not awarded	Not awarded
2004	Not awarded	Lavence Lim	Not awarded	Not awarded	Not awarded
2003	Carrie Lee	Not awarded	Not awarded	Not awarded	Not awarded

Year	Miss Malaysia Tourism Pageant Elemental Court Titlists	
Year	Miss Malaysia Tourism Queen Of The Year	Miss Malaysia Asia Pacific
2001	Arase Sathivel	Not awarded
2000	Carla Soong	Lim Sui Pei
1999		
1998
1997	Karmen Khor	Not awarded
1996	Zoee Tan	Not awarded

Year	Miss Malaysia Tourism Pageant Elemental Court Titlists					
Year	Miss Malaysia Tourism	Miss Malaysia Tourism Queen Of The Year	Miss Malaysia Tourism Global	Miss Malaysia Chinese	Miss Malaysia Intercontinental	Miss Malaysia Dreamgirl
1995	Not awarded	Not awarded	Not awarded	Carol Lee	Frennie Hew	Not awarded
1994	Emelia Rosnaida	Not awarded	Not awarded	Not awarded	Not awarded	Not awarded
1993	Not awarded	Susan Manen	Evan Chin	Not awarded	Rachelle Ng	Not awarded
1992	Not awarded	Not awarded	Kelly Phua	Not awarded	Not awarded	Penny Soon
1991	Not awarded	Not awarded	Datin Angelyn Phua	Not awarded	Not awarded	Not awarded
1990	Not awarded	Stephanie Law	Not awarded	Not awarded	Not awarded	Not awarded

=== Representative to Miss Tourism International ===
Year	Representative's Name	Hometown	Placement	Special Awards	Ref
2023	Jen Cheang Shi Hui		3rd Runner-up (Miss Tourism Cosmopolitan International)	Best In National Costume; Miss Friendship	
2022	Phoebe Ong Yi Huui	Sabah	6th Runner-up (Miss South East Asia Tourism Ambassadress)		
2021	How Zo Ee	Selangor	4th Runner-up (Miss Tourism Cosmopolitan International)	Top 5 – Best in Talent	
2020	Lim Sue Anne	Kuala Lumpur	6th Runner-up (Miss South East Asia Ambassadress)	Miss Glamorous Carlo Rino; Miss Sheng Tai Lifestyle Award	
2019	Cheryl Loo Wen Nee	Kuala Lumpur	Top 10	Miss GINTELL Wellness; Miss Glamorous Carlo Rino	
2018	Caenne Ng	Kuala Lumpur	5th Runner-up (Miss South East Asia Ambassadress)	Miss Popularity (Online Voting); Best National Costume	
2017	Melissa Ng Sook Khuan	Kuala Lumpur	Top 10		
2016	Ng Shin Ying	Kuala Lumpur	Top 10	Miss Talent	
2014	Ranjani Rajamanickam	Kuala Lumpur	Top 20	Miss Friendship	
2013	Thaarah Ganesan	Kuala Lumpur	4th Runner-up (Miss Tourism Cosmopolitan International)		
2012	Jun Yong Wan Jun	Kuala Lumpur	4th Runner-up (Dreamgirl of the Year International)	Miss Talent	
2011	Aileen Gabriella Robinson	Kuala Lumpur	Miss Tourism International 2011		
2010	Gabriella Ashley Boudulle	Kuala Lumpur	Top 10	Best National Costume	
2009	Edweena Marcus	Kuala Lumpur	3rd Runner-up (Miss Tourism Global)	Best National Costume	
2008	Angela Ching Cheau Thung	Kuala Lumpur	Top 15	Miss Friendship	
2006	Brenda Chew Sze Rou	Kuala Lumpur	Unplaced	Miss Friendship	
2005	Ivylyn Tan Theng Theng	Kuala Lumpur	Top 10		
2004	Melissa Theseira	Kuala Lumpur	Top 10	Miss Friendship	
2003	Carrie Lee Sze Kei	Kuala Lumpur	Top 10		
2002	Jacqlyne Chin Kim Lu	Kuala Lumpur	Top 10		
2001	Lyndel Soon Gaid Sim	Kuala Lumpur	4th Runner-up (Miss Tourism Cosmopolitan International)		
2000	Mabel Kang Chor Peng	Kuala Lumpur	Top 10		
1999	Michelle Tung Mei Chin	Kuala Lumpur	Top 10	Miss Friendship	
1998	Ooi Bee Bee	Kuala Lumpur	3rd Runner-up		
1995	Lavinia Tan Poh Ling	Kuala Lumpur	1st Runner-up		
1994	Emylia Rosnaida Abdul Hamid	Batu Gajah	1st Runner-up		

=== Representative to Miss Tourism Queen of the Year International ===
Year	Representative's Name	Hometown	Placement	Special Awards	Ref
2021	Rachel Tee Hsu Xin	Malacca	Unplaced		
2017	Lee Jia Ling	Kuala Lumpur	Top 29	Best in Talent; Best in Social Media	
2016	Thalia Thin	Kuala Lumpur	Top 20	Best in Talent	
2015	Rishon Shun	Sabah	Top 12	Miss Friendship	
2011	Eugenee Ooi Lee Shen	Kuala Lumpur	3rd Runner-up		
2010	Marina Liaw Mei Ee	Kuala Lumpur	Top 10	Best National Costume	
2009	Subathra Jeyabalan	Kuala Lumpur	Unplaced		
2008	Yuanie Kung	Kuala Lumpur	Unplaced		
2006	Constance Lau Chia Li	Kuala Lumpur	Unplaced	Miss Photogenic	
2005	Gurdev Kaur	Kuala Lumpur	Top 12		
2004	Lavence Lim	Kuala Lumpur	Top 10		
2001	Arase Sathivel	Kuala Lumpur	Unplaced		
2000	Carla Soong	Kuala Lumpur	Top 10	Miss Personality	
1997	Carmen Khor	Kuala Lumpur	Unplaced		
1996	Kimberly Tan Kim Kim	Kuala Lumpur	1st Runner-up	Miss Personality	
1995	Previtha Thiyagarajah	Kuala Lumpur	1st Runner-up		
1994	Cherlyn Khoo Mei Eyin	Kuala Lumpur	Top 10	Best National Costume	
1993	Susan Marguerite Manen	Kuala Lumpur	4th Runner-up	Miss Photogenic	

=== Representative to Miss Tourism Metropolitan International ===
Year	Representative's Name	Hometown	Placement	Special Awards	Ref
2021	Yoong Jia Yi	Kuala Lumpur	Unplaced		
2019	Tiong Li San	Kuala Lumpur	1st Runner-up	Miss Agape Wellness Beauty	
2017	Crystal Tung	Kuala Lumpur	Unplaced		
2016	Xandria Ban Kah Yee	Kuala Lumpur	Top 10	Miss Good Luck	
2015	Elaine Chong	Kuala Lumpur	Unplaced		
2009	Yvonne Lee	Kuala Lumpur	Unplaced		
2008	Angelreena Lim	Kuala Lumpur	Unplaced		
2007	Joanne Chan	Kuala Lumpur	Top 10	Miss Friendship	

=== Representative to Miss South East Asia Tourism Ambassadress ===
Year	Representative's Name	Hometown	Placement	Special Awards	Ref
2015	Shirley Hew	Kuala Lumpur	Top 7		
2015	Joey Ong Ai Ee	Kuala Lumpur	Unplaced	Miss Friendship	

=== Representative to Miss Chinese World ===
Year	Representative's Name	Hometown	Placement	Special Awards	Ref
2026	Ilyn Loh	Kuala Lumpur		Best In Talent; Miss Mercato Glamour; World Ginseng Elegance Star Award	
2026	Charmaine Chan	Johor			
2026	Katy Lee	Selangor			
2026	Verra Chan	Bintulu			
2023	Yoong Jia Yi	Melaka	2nd Runner-Up	Miss Mercato Glamour Award for Best Elegant	
2023	Tan Wei Lin	Johor	Unplaced		
2023	Joanne Clare Deaves	Kota Kinabalu	Unplaced	Best In Talent	
2023	Lim Wen Qi	Kuala Lumpur	Unplaced		
2023	Lau Koh Sin	Kuching	Top 5	Miss Oriental/Best Oriental	
2023	Lee Chai Suen	Penang	Unplaced		
2023	Ng Yong Jia	Perak	Unplaced	Miss GINTELL Wellness Best Health Image; SLIM DOC Best Physique Award	
2023	Er Wen Xin	Selangor	Unplaced		
2021	Aun Li Ying	Johor	1st Runner Up	Miss DSY Beauty Elegant	
2021	Jenny Ching	Kedah	Unplaced		
2021	Paris Chan	Kota Kinabalu	Unplaced		
2021	Lee Sherly	Kuala Lumpur	Top 10	Miss DIAMOND STAR Oriental Beauty	
2021	Winnie Bong	Kuching	Unplaced		
2021	Qiqi Lian	Penang	Unplaced		
2021	Oh Poh Yen	Perak	Unplaced		
2021	Chan Jing Er	Selangor	Unplaced		
2017	Lee Hui Qian	Kuala Lumpur	Unknown	Miss Dews Healthy Skin	
2017	Adeline Chan Yin Ling	Penang	Unknown		
2017	Chong Jia Ying	Perak	Unknown	Miss Oriental	
2017	Anny Wong Wei Wei	Sibu	Unknown		
2011	Unknown	Kuala Lumpur	Unknown		
2011	Unknown	Penang	Unknown		
2011	Unknown	Perak	Unknown		
2011	Unknown	Sibu	Unknown		
2005	Unknown				

== Fatwa ruling in Malaysia ==
In Malaysia, female Muslims were denied participation in beauty pageants following the issue of a fatwa in 1996 by the Mufti of Selangor, Ishak Baharom. The issue came to a nasty twist in July - September 1997 when four Malay participants joined the Miss Malaysian petite contest, only to be arrested by the authorities. In the ensuing public outcry and debate that followed, the effectiveness of the fatwa was shown given the influence of the Selangor's Mufti over the nation's sharia law. The fatwa resonated with the ideology that Muslim women should cover up private parts of their body, or Aurat of which the beauty pageants' practices ran contrary to - even though such religious enactments also apply to male pageants.

In Kuala Lumpur on 21 July 2013, the organisers of Miss Malaysia World 2013 were forced to drop four of its Muslim finalists following a fatwa prohibiting Muslim women from joining beauty pageants. According to Wan Zahidi, the fatwa prohibiting Muslim women from joining beauty pageants was issued and gazetted under the Federal Territories Islamic Administration Act in February 1996.

In recent years, the National Fatwa Council, the country's highest Islamic body, had also issued rulings forbidding Muslims from using Botox and banned women from exhibiting tomboy behaviour, which it defined as behaving or dressing like men or taking part in lesbian sex.

The council came under heavy scrutiny for its proposal to ban yoga after a university lecturer advised people to stop practising it for fear that it could deviate from the teachings of Islam. The move was met with protests from progressive Muslim women's groups like Sisters in Islam who deemed the fatwas regressive while observers claimed it highlighted the worrying trend of overt Islamisation in Malaysia.

The four contestants are:

1. Wafa Johanna de Korte, 19, Kuala Lumpur
2. Sara Amellia Bernard, 20, Perak
3. Miera Sheikh, 19, Malacca
4. Kathrina Binti Ridzuan, 24, Kuala Lumpur

Nevertheless, a public outcry ensued, as members of the public questioned the way the religious authorities handled the matter as well as the abrupt ruling which came about – Muslim women in the past had participated in beauty pageants without much protest amongst the religious authorities. This invoked the concerns of Mahathir Mohamad's who had raised objections to the way the religious authorities had implemented and enforced the law – and questions including distinctions on religious laws and personal freedom were raised. Nevertheless, the fatwa ruling has since been very effective; Muslim women have since then been deterred from joining any beauty pageants. Malaysian beauty pageants, in compliance with the law, similarly denied Muslim individuals from participating. However, Muslim women may still join smaller scale beauty pageant contests such as Dewi Remaja, Miss Intercontinental, and Miss Tourism International, provided that they don't display publicly wearing swimsuits.

== See also ==
- Miss Universe Malaysia
- Miss World Malaysia
- Miss International Malaysia
- Miss Earth Malaysia
- Miss Grand Malaysia
- Unduk Ngadau
- Dewi Remaja
