= Miss World Malaysia 2022 =

- Date: 27 August 2022
- Presenters: Jimmy Pamo; Melisha Lin
- Entertainment: Dewi Liana Seriestha; Venisa Judah; Dr. Sean Wong
- Venue: Sipadan Hall, Sabah International Convention Centre, Kota Kinabalu, Sabah
- Broadcaster: HyperLive
- Entrants: 23
- Placements: 6
- Winner: Wenanita Angang; Sabah

Miss World Malaysia 2022, the 54th edition of the Miss World Malaysia pageant, was held at Sipadan Hall, Sabah International Convention Centre, Kota Kinabalu, Sabah.

Miss World Malaysia 2021, Dr. Lavanya Sivaji crowned her successor, Wenanita Angang at the end of the event. She represented Malaysia at Miss World 2023 pageant.

== Pageant ==
=== Background ===
The pageant was attended by the president of Miss World, Julia Morley as well as Miss World 2021, Karolina Bielawska. She was the first reigning titleholder of Miss World to arrive in Sabah, Malaysia.

Initially, 23 contestants were chosen to compete but only top 15 contestants from all over Malaysia competed for the crown and title. The contestants had the chance to participate in various activities such as philanthropic as well as fun activities in Kota Kinabalu and Kiulu. The media conference, sashing ceremony and photoshoot was held on 23 to 24 August 2022. Hilton Kota Kinabalu have functioned as the accommodation for the contestants during the pageant activities in Sabah.

== Contestants ==
23 contestants were chosen to compete but only 15 contestants made it to the finals.

Contestant	Represented	Age (Note: Ages at the time of the pageant)	Placement
Aishu Ashvinaa Jeyabalan	Kajang, Selangor		
Ashwini Ravi	Puchong, Selangor		
Thivyawathy Krishna Kumar	Klang, Selangor		
Adlyn Jayne Andrew	Selangor		Top 6
Angela Quah	Johor Bahru, Johor		
Febe Rachel Sabtuh	Kota Kinabalu, Sabah	26	
Janilda Navya Tiong Rui Fen	Johor	19	
Manjula June Tamara Esotharan	Kuala Lumpur		
Vanishree Raman	Selangor		
Nancy Tor	Betong, Sarawak	25	Top 6
Theevya Ulaganathan	Selangor	26	
Venisa Judah	Kota Kinabalu, Sabah	25	Top 6
Wenanita Wences Angang	Kuala Penyu, Sabah	26	Miss World Malaysia 2022
Anya Kimberly Kow	Paitan, Sabah	19	2nd Princess
Evelyn Ting	Kuching, Sarawak	25	1st Princess
Angeline Anusya Retna Nesan	Kuala Lumpur		Top 23 (Note: The top 23 semi-finalists were revealed on 5 August 2022. The top 15 finalists were announced on 15 August 2022. The following 8 contestants did not advance to the finale.)
Archana Ganesan	Batu Caves, Selangor		Top 23
Einthumathi Ulaganathan	Perai, Penang		Top 23
Helen Chong Yi Xin	Sepang, Selangor		Top 23
Jade Park	Kota Melaka, Melaka	28	Top 23
Joanna Joseph	Klang, Selangor	24	Top 23
Khirthiga Chandrasekharan	Kuala Lumpur		Top 23
Lisa Marie	Kuala Lumpur		Top 23
