= Miss World Malaysia =

Beauty pageant

- Type: Malaysian women's beauty pageant
- Franchise holder: HyperLive Entertainment
- Headquarters: Kota Kinabalu, Sabah
- Asia represented: Southeast Asia
- First edition: 20 April 1963; 63 years ago
- Most recent edition: 3 December 2024; 23 months ago
- Current titleholder: Taanusiya Chetty; Kuala Lumpur
- Founder: Paul Lee
- Key people: Julia Morley
- National Director: Sean Wong
- Language: English
- Website: Official website

Miss World Malaysia is a national beauty pageant and non-governmental organisation that selects Malaysia's representative for the Miss World competition. In instances where the winner does not meet eligibility requirements, a runner-up may be appointed.

The reigning Miss World Malaysia, Taanusiya Chetty of Kuala Lumpur, she represented the nation at the Miss World 2026 pageant and finished 2nd Runner-Up. Meanwhile, Saroop Roshi of Perak has been appointed to represent Malaysia at Miss World 2025 where she finished as top 40 quarter-finalists.

== History ==
Malaysia’s involvement in the Miss World pageant dates back to 1960, when Eric Morley extended the first official invitation to then-Malaya.

On 7 August 2018, the Miss World Malaysia pageant came under the new management of Fantastic Golden Sdn. Bhd., which was officially appointed as the national licensee. Singaporean singer, songwriter, and social entrepreneur Sean Wong, was named national director by Julia Morley, chairwoman of the Miss World Organisation. Miss World Malaysia 2018 was held on 8 September at the Borneo Convention Centre Kuching (BCCK), marking the first time the national pageant took place in Sarawak.

=== 2020–present ===
The COVID‑19 pandemic forced the Miss World Malaysia pageant to adapt its format. In 2021, the national competition was held virtually due to the pandemic for the first time via the HyperLive platform, allowing contestants to participate virtually across the country. This marked a shift from traditional in-person events to a digital-first experience, allowing contestants to still showcase their talents, advocacy, and beauty in a safe and engaging manner.

Winners like Lavanya Sivaji, Wenanita Angang, and Saroop Roshi championed social causes such as Indigenous health equity, autism therapy via hippotherapy, and mental health advocacy for underprivileged youth.

=== Host Country ===
In 1986, in response to growing accusations of Western bias in the judging process, Miss World organisers decided to relocate the preliminary segment of the competition to Macau. At first, Eric Morley, founder of the pageant, made efforts to bring the 1986 edition to Malaysia. The underlying motivation was to address growing criticisms of Western bias in the judging process. However, despite initial interest and discussions with local organisers, negotiations could not be finalised due to logistical, financial, and possibly cultural concerns. As a result, the plan was shelved, and the pageant continued to be held in its traditional host city, London.

Sarawak had previously withdrawn its bid to host the Miss World pageant due to inadequate facilities, plans were revived in 2003 with the assurance that Kuching could become a future venue once a new convention centre with a 5,000-seat capacity was completed. On 15 April 2003, then Minister of Tourism, Datuk Abang Johari Tun Openg, expressed confidence that Kuching City would be ready to host the international pageant by 2005 or 2006.

=== Islamic law and controversy ===
Since 1996, a fatwa issued by the National Fatwa Council declared that it is forbidden for Muslim women to participate in or organise beauty pageants that select representatives for international competitions. This edict was gazetted under the Administration of Islamic Laws (Federal Territories) Act 1993.

In Miss World Malaysia 2013, four Muslim finalists were disqualified after the Federal Territories Mufti, Datuk Wan Zahidi Wan Teh reaffirmed the fatwa’s authority, prompting official intervention by JAWI (Federal Territory Islamic Department). Organisers were instructed to disqualify them, and investigations were initiated under the Syariah Criminal Offences Act (Federal Territories) 1997 for alleged violations and potential insult to religion. The disqualification of the four Muslim finalists in 2013 was not unprecedented. This was not the first time the issue of Muslim participation in Miss World Malaysia had surfaced. In 2001, a similar controversy arose when Norazlin Johari, a Muslim finalist from Sarawak, was disqualified from competing, reportedly due to religious sensitivities. These recurring incidents reflect the long-standing tension between religious edicts and national beauty pageants in Malaysia.

The rulings received public criticism, particularly from civil society groups such as Sisters in Islam, who argued the ban was overly restrictive and infringed on personal freedoms. They questioned whether attire or participation in a pageant should warrant legal or religious exclusion.

As a result, Muslim women have been effectively barred from Miss World Malaysia and similar national pageants. This has shaped the demographic of past titleholders with Rahima Orchient Yayah noted as the last Muslim woman to compete internationally before the matter became legally variable.

=== Notable winners ===
- Catherine Loh (1963) – She was born in Beaufort, North Borneo, and raised in Brunei Town, she represented Brunei in Miss Malaysia 1963. That same year, she became the first Bruneian woman to compete on the international stage, finishing in the top 14 at Miss World 1963.
- Michelle Yeoh (1983) – She placed 18th at Miss World 1983, narrowly missing the top 15 finalists. Nevertheless, she was known internationally for her roles in the 1997 James Bond film Tomorrow Never Dies and the Chinese-language martial arts film Crouching Tiger, Hidden Dragon (2000). In 2023, she won her first Academy Award making her the first Asian woman to win an Oscar for lead actress.
- Samantha Schubert (1991) – She placed 20th overall in Miss World 1991, though only the top 10 were selected as finalists. She made a successful career as a model, actress and producer; she later moved to Los Angeles to focus on acting. In 2015, she was diagnosed with pancreatic cancer and died on 25 April 2016.
- Erra Fazira (1992) – A well-known Malaysian actress, singer, model, TV presenter, and film producer.
- Rahima Orchient Yayah (1994) – In Miss World 1994, she made history as the first and only Muslim woman from Malaysia to reach the top 10 finalists. She is now a successful businesswoman in Malaysia.
- Lina Teoh (1998) – She finished as the second runner-up at Miss World 1998 — Malaysia’s highest-ever placement in the pageant. She took up acting and she also hosted numerous TV shows.
- Deborah Henry (2007) – A successful model, TV host, actress, and humanitarian. Her performance during the pageant was considered as one of the country's best performances in the pageant's history although she only finished at the top 16. Beyond entertainment, she is the co-founder of Fugee School, an education initiative for refugee children, and has been widely recognised for her philanthropic work across Asia. She also serves as a refugee-rights advocate for the UNHCR Malaysia and as a children’s rights advocate with World Vision.
- Wincci Soo (2008) – The first titleholder to receive a PhD. In 2022, she was appointed as an Associate Professor at Universiti Teknologi MARA and also released a trilingual single titled “Como Esta.”
- Thanuja Ananthan (2009) – Following her pageant success, she carved a multifaceted career in modelling, television, and acting across Malaysia and Singapore. She is also a passionate animal advocate serving as an ambassador for SPCA Malaysia.
- Dewi Liana Seriestha (2014) – The first titleholder to win the Miss World Talent award in Miss World 2014. Overall, she finished at the top 25 quarter-finalists.

=== Editions ===
Year	Date	Pageant Venue	Entrants
1963	April 21	Stadium Negara, Kuala Lumpur	30
1964	October 9	Stadium Negara, Kuala Lumpur	14
1965	October 9	Stadium Negara, Kuala Lumpur	14
1966	October 10	Stadium Negara, Kuala Lumpur	14
1971	August 30	Stadium Negara, Kuala Lumpur	14
1973	October 27	Stadium Negara, Kuala Lumpur	14
1974	October 27	Nirwana Ballroom, Hilton Hotel, Kuala Lumpur	14
1975	October 28	Nirwana Ballroom, Hilton Hotel, Kuala Lumpur	14
1977	October 7	Nirwana Ballroom, Hilton Hotel, Kuala Lumpur	14
1982	September 25	Rampaisari Ballroom, Merlin Subang, Selangor	14
1983	October 1	Ipoh City Hall, Ipoh, Perak	14
1985	October 1	Merlin Subang Hotel, Selangor	14
1986	September 27	Putra World Trade Centre, Kuala Lumpur	18
1987	September 15	Rampaisari Ballroom, Merlin Subang, Selangor	14
1988	September 14	Shangri-La Hotel, Kuala Lumpur	14
1989	September 19	Shangri-La Hotel, Kuala Lumpur	14
1991	November 4	Concorde Hotel, Wisma Concorde, Kuala Lumpur	13
1992	August 23	Crown Princess Hotel, Kuala Lumpur	14
1993	August 15	Grand Mahkota Ballroom, Istana Hotel, Kuala Lumpur	15
1994	September 10	Crown Princess Hotel, Kuala Lumpur	16
1995	August 18	The Legend Hotel, Kuala Lumpur	20
1996	September 15	The Legend Hotel, Kuala Lumpur	20
1997	September 13	The Legend Hotel, Kuala Lumpur	20
1998	September 25	Grand Hall, Renaissance Hotel, Kuala Lumpur	20
1999	August 20	Grand Hall, Renaissance Hotel, Kuala Lumpur	19
2000	August 23	Grand Hall, Renaissance Hotel, Kuala Lumpur	19
2001	August 10	Grand Hall, Renaissance Hotel, Kuala Lumpur	20
2002	August 23	Grand Hall, Renaissance Hotel, Kuala Lumpur	20
2003	September 5	Grand Hall, Renaissance Hotel, Kuala Lumpur	20
2004	August 21	Grand Hall, Renaissance Hotel, Kuala Lumpur	14
2005	September 8	Shangri-La Hotel, Kuala Lumpur	18
2006	July 28	Sime Darby Convention Centre, Kuala Lumpur	19
2007	May 25	Palace of the Golden Horses Hotel, Kuala Lumpur	16
2008	August 9	Palace of the Golden Horses Hotel, Kuala Lumpur	20
2011	August 20	Sunway Pyramid Convention Centre, Selangor	26
2012	July 13	Zouk Club, TREC Holdings, Kuala Lumpur	17
2013	August 1	Corus Hotel, Hampshire Residence, Kuala Lumpur	15
2014	August 30	Corus Hotel, Hampshire Residence, Kuala Lumpur	21
2015	August 29	Corus Hotel, Hampshire Residence, Kuala Lumpur	20
2016	August 28	Corus Hotel, Hampshire Residence, Kuala Lumpur	20
2018	September 8	Borneo Convention Centre, Sarawak	12
2019	October 6	Mega Star Arena, Kuala Lumpur	20
2021	October 16	Virtual Pageant	39
2022	August 27	Sabah International Convention Centre, Sabah	14
2023	August 25	Sabah International Convention Centre, Sabah	14
2024	December 3	Sabah International Convention Centre, Sabah	11

=== Requirements ===
Requirements for participants of the Miss World Malaysia election: (2018)

- Malaysian citizen, ages 17 to 28.
- Non-Muslim and not married or divorced or have had children.
- Must be able to communicate well in English and Bahasa Melayu.
- Preferably special expertise or achievements in various fields (music, dance, singing, leadership, etc.)

== Titleholders (2019–present) ==
Year	Miss World Malaysia	Runners-Up	
2019	Alexis SueAnn	Juliana Sambai Sibat	Melissa Raj
2021	Lavanya Sivaji	Anya Kimberly Kow	Charissa Chong
2022	Wenanita Angang	Evelyn Ting	Anya Kimberly Kow
2023	Saroop Roshi	Natalie Ang	Shu Wen Chai
2024	Taanusiya Chetty	Kelly Eleanor Tseu	Hantze Liow

== Representatives to Miss World ==
The following women have represented Malaysia in Miss World, one of the four major international beauty pageants for women.

Color key

- : Declared as Winner
- : Ended as runner-up or top 5/6 qualification
- : Ended as semi-finalist
- : Ended as quarter-finalist
- : Unplaced but given special award(s)
- : Withdrew or did not attend the competition

Year	Candidate	State	Placement & Performance	
Year	Candidate	State	Placements	Special award(s)
2027	TBA	TBA	TBA	
2026	Taanusiya Chetty	Kuala Lumpur	2nd Runner-Up	5 Special Awards: Miss World Asia; Winner – Beauty with a Purpose; Top 20 – People's Choice Award (Top 5 of Asia & Oceania); Top 20 – Multimedia Award (Top 5 of Asia & Oceania); Top 60 – Miss World Top Model
2025	Saroop Roshi	Perak	Top 40	2 Special Awards: Top 7 – Multimedia Award; Top 48 – Miss World Talent
2023	Wenanita Angang	Sabah	Top 40	1 Special Award: Top 25 – Head to Head Challenge
2021	Lavanya Sivaji	Selangor	Top 40	1 Special Award: Top 28 – Beauty with a Purpose
2019	Alexis SueAnn	Selangor	Top 40	2 Special Awards: Top 10 – Multimedia Award; Top 12 – Beauty with a Purpose
2018	Larissa Ping	Sarawak	Top 30	7 Special Awards: Winner – Head to Head Challenge; 4th runner-up – Miss World Talent; Top 5 – Best World Designer Award; Top 10 – Multimedia Award; Top 12 – Beauty with a Purpose; Top 32 – Miss World Top Model; Finalist for Dances of the World
2016	Tatiana Kumar (Note: Tatiana was dethroned few months after competing at Miss World 2016 due to a breach of Code of Conduct and contract on 6 March 2017. She was replaced by the first runner-up, Shweta Sekhon.)	Kuala Lumpur	Unplaced	
2016	Shweta Sekhon	Kuala Lumpur	Took over the title after the original titleholder was dethroned 1	
2015	Brynn Zalina Lovett	Sabah	Unplaced	3 Special Awards: 1st runner-up – Miss World Talent; Top 10 – Multimedia Award; Top 11 – Dances of the World
2014	Dewi Liana Seriestha	Sarawak	Top 25	1 Special Award: Winner – Miss World Talent
2013	Melinder Bhullar	Selangor	Unplaced	1 Special Award: 4th runner-up – Multimedia Award
2012	Lee Yvonne	Selangor	Unplaced	
2011	Chloe Chen	Kuala Lumpur	Unplaced	
2010	Nadia Heng	Negeri Sembilan	Unplaced	
2009	Thanuja Ananthan	Kuala Lumpur	Unplaced	3 Special Awards: Top 12 – Miss World Top Model; Top 20 – Beauty with a Purpose; Top 40 – Beach Beauty Award
2008	Wincci Soo	Selangor	Unplaced	2 Special Awards: Top 19 – Miss World Talent; Top 32 – Miss World Top Model
2007	Deborah Henry	Kuala Lumpur	Top 16	2 Special Awards: Top 12 – Miss World Sport; Top 21 – Beach Beauty Award
2006	Adeline Choo	Johor	Unplaced	
2005	Emmeline Ng	Kuala Lumpur	Unplaced	1 Special Award: Winner – Miss World Sport
2004	Gloria Ting	Sarawak	Unplaced	
2003	Wong Sze Zen	Pahang	Unplaced	
2002	Mabel Ng	Penang	Unplaced	
2001	Sasha Tan	Johor	Unplaced	
2000	Tan Su Wei	Malacca	Unplaced	
1999	Jaclyn Lee	Kedah	Unplaced	
1998	Lina Teoh	Malacca	2nd Runner-Up	1 Special Award: Miss World Asia & Oceania
1997	Arianna Teoh	Penang	Top 10	
1996	Qu-An How	Selangor	Unplaced	
1995	Trincy Low	Penang	Unplaced	
1994	Rahima Orchient Yayah	Sabah	Top 10	
1993	Jacqueline Ngu	Sarawak	Unplaced	
1992	Fazira Wan Chek	Selangor	Unplaced	
1991	Samantha Schubert †	Kuala Lumpur	Unplaced	
1989	Vivien Chen	Sarawak	Unplaced	
1988	Sue Wong	Penang	Unplaced	
1987	Sheila Shankar	Kuala Lumpur	Unplaced	
1986	Joan Cardoza	Malacca	Unplaced	
1985	Rosalind Kong	Perak	Unplaced	
1984	Christina Teo	Selangor	Unplaced	
1983	Michelle Yeoh	Perak	Unplaced	
1982	Nellie Teoh	Kuala Lumpur	Unplaced	
1981	Cynthia de Castro	Selangor	Unplaced	
1980	Callie Liew	Pahang	Unplaced	
1979	Shirley Chew	Perlis	Top 15	
1978	Kartina Osir	Sabah	Unplaced	
1977	Christine Mary Lim	Penang	Withdrew before finals as a protest 2	
1976	Puteh Naziadin	Terengganu	Withdrew before finals as a protest 3	
1975	Siti Fauziah Haron	Johor	Unplaced	
1974	Shirley Tan	Johor	Unplaced	
1973	Narimah Yusoff (Note: Narimah was originally first runner-up, but became Miss World Malaysia after the original titleholder, Marjorie, relinquished her title. Due to the pageant rules, if for any reason due to age or any other reason, the runner-up will be able to take over the title.)	Perak	Unplaced	
1973	Majorie Ann Hon	Kuala Lumpur	Disqualified from competing after stepping down from her title 4	
1972	Janet Chin	Johor	Unplaced	
1971	Daphne Munro	Selangor	Unplaced	
1970	Mary Ann Wong	Pahang	Unplaced	
1968	Ramlah Alang	Terengganu	Disqualified from participation for undisclosed reasons	
1967	Rosenelly Abu Bakar	Selangor	Disqualified from participation after failing to arrive at the pageant on time	
1966	Merlyn McKelvie	Selangor	Unplaced	
1965	Clara de Run	Selangor	Unplaced	
1964	Leonie Foo	Perak	Appointed representative; later withdrew and did not attend the pageant	
1963	Catherine Loh	Brunei	Top 14	

- Malaysia did not compete in 1964, 1967–1969, 1990, and 2017.
- The national pageant was not held in 1969 due to protests by the Malaysian Islamic Party, in 1990 because of insufficient sponsorship, and in 2017 following an internal dispute among the organisers.
- ^Note 1: The runner-up did not compete in Miss World 2016 as the reigning titleholder, who was later dethroned, had already represented the country at the international pageant prior to the decision.
- ^Note 2: In Miss World 1977, Malaysia withdrew from the pageant in protest against South Africa’s apartheid policy. At the time, South Africa held separate competitions for white and black contestants, but only the white winner was allowed to compete internationally. This exclusionary practice remained in place until apartheid ended in the early 1990s.
- ^Note 3: Malaysia withdrew from Miss World 1976 in protest against the inclusion of two separate South African contestants—one white and one black—which reflected the country’s apartheid policy of racial segregation.
- ^Note 4: Due to personal reasons, the reigning titleholder stepped down, and the first runner-up was appointed as her successor.
- ^Note 5: The 2020 edition of the pageant was cancelled as a result of the COVID-19 pandemic.
- ^Note 6: No pageant was held in 2022, as the rescheduled Miss World 2021 took place on 16 March 2022 following a COVID-19 outbreak in Puerto Rico.
- ^Note 7: No pageant was held in 2023, as Miss World 2023 was rescheduled to 9 March 2024.

== See also ==
- Miss World
