= Ni Hao =

Nihao, Ni Hao, or 你好 (lit. 'hello' in Mandarin Chinese) may refer to:

- Ni Hao, Kai-Lan, American children's television show
- Hi, Mom (2021 film) (Chinese: 你好，李焕英; pinyin: Nǐ hǎo, Lǐ Huànyīng), a 2021 Chinese comedy film

== See also ==
- My Huckleberry Friends (Chinese: 你好，旧时光), 2017 Chinese streaming television series
- Last Letter (2018 film) (Chinese: 你好，之华), 2018 Chinese romantic drama film
- Mr. Siao's Mandarin Class or 你好 Mr. Siao!, 2009 Malaysian television series
- Niʻihau, a Hawaiian island
- Nīhoa, a Hawaiian island
- Neoma (disambiguation)
