= Miss World Malaysia 2019 =

52nd edition of Malaysian beauty pageant

- Date: 6 October 2019
- Venue: Mega Star Arena, Viva Mall, Kuala Lumpur, Malaysia
- Entrants: 20
- Placements: 11
- Winner: Alexis Sue-Ann Seow; Selangor

Miss World Malaysia 2019, the 52nd edition of the Miss World Malaysia pageant. The coronation night was held on October 6, 2019 at Mega Star Arena in Kuala Lumpur.

Special guests include renowned Malaysian model, actress, TV host Amber Chia, Dewi Liana Seriestha (Miss World Malaysia 2014) and Larissa Ping (Miss World Malaysia 2018). The winner received over RM30,000 in cash and a RM25,000 diamond ring from CERES, plus a free 1-month trip to London, United Kingdom.

20 contestants competed in the grand finale. Miss World Malaysia 2018, Larissa Ping crowned her successor, Alexis SueAnn Seow at the end of the event. She represented Malaysia at Miss World 2019 in London, United Kingdom.

== Special awards ==
Award	Delegate	Ref
People's Choice Award	07 – Alexis SueAnn Seow	
Miss Photogenic	18 – Temara Inigo	
Miss Personality	11 – Juliana Sibat	
Miss Elegant	12 – Amanda Hong	
Miss Talent	07 – Alexis SueAnn Seow	
Top Model Award	10 – Karyn Ong	
Miss Goodwill Ambassador	02 – Chermaine Kang	

== Contestants ==
20 contestants competed for the crown and title.

No.	Contestant	Placement
01	Joanneia Selin Joseph	Top 11
02	Chermaine Kang Yi Ting	Top 11
03	Rosanne Reynauld	
04	Janice Ng Si Ying	
05	Jean Kueh Yong Jun	Top 11
06	Nisha Thayananthan	Top 6
07	Alexis SueAnn Seow	Miss World Malaysia 2019
08	Melissa Jespoh Raj	2nd Princess
09	Phan Jing Mun	
10	Karyn Ong	
11	Juliana Sambai Sibat	1st Princess
12	Amanda Hong Chzi Ann	Top 6
13	Parveen Ranjit Singh	
14	Ong Kar Hooi	
15	Kimberley Lee Mei Guan	Top 11
16	Goh Jia Rong	
17	Thaneswari Rajenthiran	
18	Temara Nelia Inigo	Top 11
19	Hemavalli Raman	Top 11
20	Tan Zhi Ying	Top 6

== Judges ==
The following served as judges on the coronation night of Miss World Malaysia 2019:

- Amber Chia – Actress, Model, TV Host
- Datuk Sri Navneet Goenka – CEO of Ceres Jewels
- Dewi Liana Seriestha – Miss World Malaysia 2014
- Larissa Ping – Miss World Malaysia 2018

== Crossovers ==
Contestants who previously competed/appeared at other international/national beauty pageants:

=== National Pageants ===
Miss Universe Malaysia

- 2018 – Alexis Sue-Ann Seow (1st Runner-up)
- 2019 – Jean Kueh Yong Jun (Miss Congeniality and Miss Babel Body Beautiful)

Miss Borneo Hornbill Festival

- 2018 – Juliana Sambai anak Sibat (Winner)

Miss Grand Malaysia

- 2019 – Chermaine Kang Yi Ting
