= Miss World Malaysia 2021 =

- Date: 16 October 2021
- Venue: Kuala Lumpur, Malaysia and various locations virtually
- Broadcaster: HyperLive.tv
- Entrants: 39
- Placements: 12
- Winner: Lavanya Sivaji; Selangor

Miss World Malaysia 2021, the 53rd edition of the Miss World Malaysia pageant was held virtually on October 16, 2021, due to the COVID-19 pandemic.

The pageant was aired virtually on a new interactive online TV platform HyperLive. Preliminary event was held on October 2, 2021. The pageant was a collaboration with Sabah Tourism Board and Sabah Association of Tour and Travel Agents (SATTA) to promote Sabah as a tourist destination and produce highly engaging tourism-related live variety shows hosted by Malaysian beauty queens.

39 contestants from all across Malaysia competed for the title. Miss World Malaysia 2019, Alexis Sue-Ann crowned her successor, Lavanya Sivaji at the end of the event. The official crown ceremony was held on November 1, 2021, at Ceres Jewels in Kuala Lumpur. She represented Malaysia at Miss World 2021 which was held in San Juan, Puerto Rico.

== Contestants ==
39 contestants competed in the preliminary but only 37 contestants competed in the finale.

No.	Contestant	Placement
01	Adlyn Jayne Andrew	Top 12
02	Angela Quah	
03	Anya Kimberly Kow	1st Princess
04	Buganna Saravanna	
05	Chantel	
06	Chara Aren Nawan	
07	Charissa Chong	2nd Princess
08	Giselle Ching An Yee	
09	Clera Pungi	
10	Crystal Tung Lu Yie	5th Princess
11	Dabbie Bungan	
12	Dana Koay	
13	Danoshini Gopal	
14	Durga Dee	
15	Susie Siew Sing Goh	
16	Haylynn Tan	Top 12
17	Hemavalli Raman	
18	Jessica Gomez	Top 12
19	Lavanya Sivaji	Miss World Malaysia 2021
20	Leonara Henry	
21	Shanny Lim	Top 12
22	Soluna Shun Qi	
23	Felina Rouge	
25	Skye Malarvili	
26	Malanika Sahathevan	3rd Princess
27	Menaka Kathiresan	
28	Nancy Tor	
29	Nandhini Sundaram	
30	Narmatha	
31	Natalie Ang Ai Dee	4th Princess
32	Natalie Grace	
33	Nisha Lor	Top 12
34	Sanglisha Kunasekaran	
35	Shalineswari Vikneswaran	
36	Thanisha C.	
37	Tharushiny Francis	
38	Vanishaa Rameas	
39	Vinthiya Vasu	Top 12
40	Shreethaar Arunagirinathan	
