= Deborah Priya Henry =

Television host, former model, and refugee rights advocate

Deborah Henry
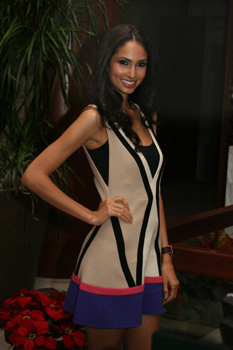
- Henry in 2007
- Born: 21 July 1985 (age 41); Dublin, Ireland
- Education: University of Queensland
- Occupations: [Model; TV host
- Height: 1.78 m (5 ft 10 in)
- Beauty pageant titleholder
- Title: Miss World Malaysia 2007; Miss Universe Malaysia 2011
- Major competitions: Miss World Malaysia 2007 (Winner); Miss World 2007 (Top 15); Miss Universe Malaysia 2011 (Winner); Miss Universe 2011 (Unplaced)

Deborah Priya Henry (born 21 July 1985), also known as Priya Emmanuel, is a Malaysian TV host, and beauty pageant titleholder who won Miss Universe Malaysia 2011. She won Miss Malaysia World 2007, and reached the top 15 at Miss World 2007.

Henry left her modelling career to champion for the lives of refugee children in Malaysia.

== Early life ==
Deborah Henry was born on 21 July 1985 in Dublin, Ireland, to a Malaysian Indian father and an Irish mother. She grew up in Kuala Lumpur, Malaysia.

Henry spent her secondary school years at Sayfol International School. She particularly excelled in basketball and volleyball at school, and won a gold medal in the Kuala Lumpur International Schools athletics meet. She received a "Sportswoman of the Year" trophy from her school for her achievements.

Henry began modelling at the age of 15 and modelled in London three years later for seven months. She appeared in Malaysian rock band Estranged's music video "Itu Kamu".

Henry holds a B. Arts. degree in Political Science and Economics from the University of Queensland, in Brisbane, Australia.

== Career ==
=== Modelling ===
Henry began modelling at the age of 15, as a catwalk and print model in Kuala Lumpur. She moved to London in 2003. She took a break from modelling in 2004 to study in Brisbane. She returned to Malaysia in 2007 and competed in Miss Malaysia World 2007. She has also appeared on the covers of Elle India, Harper's Bazaar Malaysia, Marie Claire Malaysia and many more. She has also been featured in Vogue India. Henry is the Face of Malaysian International Fashion Alliance (MIFA) 2011.

=== Pageantry ===
Henry won Miss Malaysia World 2007 and represented her country at Miss World 2007, where she reached the top 15. Henry won Miss Universe Malaysia, on 27 January 2011 in Kuala Lumpur. This gaining her the right to represent Malaysia at Miss Universe 2011, where she did not reach the semifinals.

=== TV Hosting ===
Henry was one of the three hosts for Bella, a magazine style talk show with Daphne Iking and Elaine Daly.

=== Acting ===
Henry was one of the cast for The Malay Chronicles: Bloodlines (2011).

=== Product endorsements ===
In March 2017, Henry released a ready-to-wear clothing line named Deborah Henry x FashionValet: Laidback Luxe. In collaboration with Fashion Valet, the line features clothing intended for trendy travelers.

== Humanitarian work ==
Henry co-founded Fugee School, a non-profit charity organisation that provides basic education to Somalian refugee children. To date, the school has educated more than 250 students, and currently nurturing 130 students from age four to 22. Henry is also a World Vision's Childs' rights Advocate. World Vision is a Christian relief, development and advocacy organisation. She also speaks for the Harper's Bazaar The Pink Project PSA 2010. Henry became the ambassador for Yes, I Can Campaign, an educational, awareness & advocacy campaign for the prevention of unplanned & unwanted pregnancy in Malaysia.

In 2013, Henry was included in Forbes's list of top Asian philanthropists for her contribution in "helping the many refugees from war-torn Somalia who had found their way to Malaysia".

In 2016, in conjunction with the holy month of Ramadan, Henry launched a personal fundraiser under World Vision Malaysia to raise money for displaced Syrian nationals seeking refuge in Lebanon.

Henry became one of Malaysian AIDS Foundation Red Ribbon Celebrity Supporter in 2018 joining the likes of Dato' Sri Siti Nurhaliza, Datuk Aaron Aziz, Bob Yusof, Dayang Nurfaizah, Joey G and Fahrin Ahmad to spread safe sex awareness in Malaysia. She will also be emceeing the 2018 Tun Dr Siti Hasmah Award Gala Dinner alongside Fahrin Ahmad.

== Personal life ==
Henry married Malaysian entrepreneur, Dr Rajiv Bhanot, on 27 February 2017 in Udaipur, India. They met when Henry was sixteen years old.

Awards and achievements
| Preceded by Nadine Ann Thomas | Miss Universe Malaysia; 2011 | Succeeded by Kimberley Leggett |
| Preceded by Adeline Choo Wan Ling | Miss Malaysia World; 2007 | Succeeded by Soo Wincci |
