= Miss Universe Malaysia 2010 =

- Date: 16 May 2010
- Venue: Royale Chulan Hotel, Kuala Lumpur
- Broadcaster: Astro Hitz
- Entrants: 18
- Placements: 5
- Winner: Nadine Ann Thomas; Selangor

Miss Universe Malaysia 2010, formerly titled Miss Malaysia Universe up until last year, the 44th edition of the Miss Universe Malaysia, was held on 16 May 2010 at Royale Chulan Hotel, Kuala Lumpur. Nadine Thomas of Selangor was crowned by the outgoing titleholder, Joannabelle Ng of Sabah at the end of the event. She then represented Malaysia at the Miss Universe 2010 pageant in Las Vegas, United States.

== Contestants ==
The official Top 18 finalists of The Next Miss Universe Malaysia 2010.

No.	Contestant	Age	Ethnicity	Occupation	Notes
1.	Cassandra Santharay	23	Eurasian	Librarian	
2.	Charlene Wong	26	Chinese	Student: Master in English literature	Top 5
3.	Chow Xiang Yee	26	Chinese	Auditor	
4.	Dalvin Kaur Parsh	23	Punjabi	Student: Deg in Information System	
5.	Dasha Subramaniam	23	Indian	Bio Med Sci Graduate	
6.	Felixia Yeap Chin Yee	23	Chinese	Model	
7.	Gail Marianne James	23	Eurasian	Business Owner	Top 5
8.	Jasmine Olikh	25	Eurasian	MBA graduate	
9.	Joanne Chong	23	Chinese	Financial Planner	
10.	Joey Hui	20	Chinese	Student: Degree in Marketing	
11.	Katherine Ng	25	Chinese	Financial Analyst	
12.	Mourhrna Anetha Reddy	25	Eurasian	Law Graduate and Model	1st Runner-up
13.	Nadine Ann Thomas	23	Indian	Event & Talent Coordinator	Winner
14.	Sarah Yap	24	Chinese	Student: Adv Diploma in Business Management	
15.	Tiong Sue Lynn	25	Chinese	Writer	
16.	Tracy Tan	21	Chinese	Student: Fashion & Merchandising	
17.	Vera Hui	25	Chinese	Flight Attendant	2nd Runner-up
18.	Zoe Lee	19	Chinese	Student: Foundation in Business Studies	

== Crossovers ==
Contestants who previously competed/appeared at other national beauty pageants:

Miss Malaysia Indian Global

- 2006 - Mourhrna Anetha Reddy (Winner)
