= Larissa Ping =

Malaysian model

Larissa Ping Liew
- Born: Larissa Ping Liew; 18 March 1999 (age 27); Kuching, Sarawak, Malaysia
- Education: University of Malaya
- Occupations: Model; beauty pageant titleholder; student
- Height: 1.72 m (5 ft 8 in)
- Beauty pageant titleholder
- Title: Miss World Malaysia 2018
- Hair colour: Dark Brown
- Eye colour: Black
- Major competitions: Miss World Malaysia 2018 (Winner); Miss World 2018 (Top 30)

Larissa Ping Liew (born 18 March 1999) is a Malaysian model, fashion blogger and beauty pageant titleholder, who was crowned Miss World Malaysia 2018. She represented Malaysia at Miss World 2018 pageant, where she placed in the Top 30.

== Personal life ==
Larissa was born and raised in Kuching, Sarawak. Her father is Malaysian Chinese and a native of the state capital city while her mother is an ethnic Kenyah from Miri, an indigenous tribe belonging to the Orang Ulu designation. She is both fluent in English as well as the national Malaysian language (particularly the Sarawakian dialect).

She studied at the St. Joseph's Private School, Kuching during her secondary school years and scored straight A's in her SPM. She finished her foundation in arts at HELP University. She was awarded 100% School Achiever Scholarship Award (SASA) totaling RM 20,000 for her foundation programme which she completed in 2018, scoring 8 High Distinctions and 5 Distinctions.

In 2023, Larissa graduated from the University of Malaya with Bachelor of Laws.

== Pageantry ==
=== Keligit Orang Ulu Miri 2018 ===
Larissa was crowned the winner of Keligit Orang Ulu for Miri Division in May 2018. The pageant is held annually in conjunction with the Gawai Dayak festival.

=== Miss World Malaysia 2018 ===
Larissa was crowned as Miss World Malaysia 2018 pageant as well as winning the Miss Talent and Miss Photogenic awards at the Borneo Convention Centre Kuching in Sarawak on 8 September 2018. She succeeded outgoing Miss World Malaysia 2016, Shweta Sekhon.

=== Miss World 2018 ===
After a year of absence, Larissa represented Malaysia at the Miss World 2018 pageant held in China on 8 December 2018. She was placed in the Top 30. Other than being in the quarter-finalist, she was placed in some of the events that occurred during the pageant week:

- Winner Head to Head challenge in Round 1 and 2
- Fourth runner-up in Miss World Talent,
- Top 5 in Best Designer Award,
- Top 12 in Beauty with a Purpose,
- Top 10 in Multimedia Award,
- Top 30 in Swimsuit music video,
- Top 32 in Miss World Top Model.

== Filmography ==
=== Music videos ===
Year	Title	Role	Singer/Artist	Ref.
2019	"Who Are U"	Herself	Zee Avi	
2020	"Liling (At Home Semangat Gawai Version)"	Herself	Alena Murang Project (with Various Artists)	

== Humanitarian works ==
Larissa is an avid advocate for children's education, spends her free time teaching Myanmar refugee children at Zomi Education Centre in Malaysia. In 2018, she spearheaded the "Indigenous Digital Outreach Programme", together with Sarawak Multimedia Authority (SMA) and The Champions Kuching at SK Long Seridan, Marudi, Sarawak. The project facilitated the setup of a computer lab, restocking the school library and replacing some of the ceiling fans and lights.

== Awards ==
- Herald Global's Most Admired Leaders Of Asia - Beauty Pageant (2019)
- The 4th World Excellence Entrepreneur Brand Celebrity Awards - Malaysia Excellence Celebrity Award (2023)

Awards and achievements
Preceded by (Sabah) Brynn Lovett	Miss World Malaysia; 2018	Succeeded by (Kuala Lumpur) Alexis Seow
