= List of Justice in the City episodes =

Below is an episodic synopsis of Justice in the City, which consists of 30 episodes and broadcast on ntv7 in Malaysia and MediaCorp Channel 8 in Singapore. The synopsis is according to Singapore's synopsis.

== Episodic synopsis ==
No.	Title	Original release date
1	"Episode One"	September 10, 2012 U (Malaysia); October 15, 2012 PG (Singapore)
2	"Episode Two"	September 11, 2012 U (Malaysia); October 16, 2012 PG (Singapore)
3	"Episode Three"	September 12, 2012 U (Malaysia); October 17, 2012 PG (Singapore)
4	"Episode Four"	September 13, 2012 U (Malaysia); October 18, 2012 PG (Singapore)
5	"Episode Five"	September 17, 2012 U (Malaysia); October 19, 2012 PG (Singapore)
6	"Episode Six"	September 18, 2012 U (Malaysia); October 22, 2012 PG (Singapore)
7	"Episode Seven"	September 19, 2012 U (Malaysia); October 23, 2012 PG (Singapore)
8	"Episode Eight"	September 20, 2012 U (Malaysia); October 24, 2012 PG (Singapore)
9	"Episode Nine"	September 24, 2012 U (Malaysia); October 25, 2012 PG (Singapore)
10	"Episode Ten"	September 25, 2012 U (Malaysia); October 26, 2012 PG (Singapore)
11	"Episode Eleven"	September 26, 2012 U (Malaysia); October 29, 2012 PG (Singapore)
12	"Episode Twelve"	September 27, 2012 U (Malaysia); October 30, 2012 PG (Singapore)
13	"Episode Thirteen"	October 1, 2012 U (Malaysia); October 31, 2012 PG (Singapore)
14	"Episode Fourteen"	October 2, 2012 U (Malaysia); November 1, 2012 PG (Singapore)
15	"Episode Fifteen"	October 3, 2012 U (Malaysia); November 2, 2012 PG (Singapore)
16	"Episode Sixteen"	October 4, 2012 U (Malaysia); November 5, 2012 PG (Singapore)
17	"Episode Seventeen"	October 8, 2012 U (Malaysia); November 6, 2012 PG (Singapore)
18	"Episode Eighteen"	October 9, 2012 U (Malaysia); November 7, 2012 PG (Singapore)
19	"Episode Nineteen"	October 10, 2012 U (Malaysia); November 8, 2012 PG (Singapore)
20	"Episode Twenty"	October 11, 2012 U (Malaysia); November 9, 2012 PG (Singapore)
21	"Episode Twenty-one"	October 15, 2012 U (Malaysia); November 12, 2012 PG (Singapore)
22	"Episode Twenty-two"	October 16, 2012 U (Malaysia); November 13, 2012 PG (Singapore)
23	"Episode Twenty-three"	October 17, 2012 U (Malaysia); November 14, 2012 PG (Singapore)
24	"Episode Twenty-four"	October 18, 2012 U (Malaysia); November 15, 2012 PG (Singapore)
25	"Episode Twenty-five"	October 22, 2012 U (Malaysia); November 16, 2012 PG (Singapore)
26	"Episode Twenty-six"	October 23, 2012 U (Malaysia); November 19, 2012 PG (Singapore)
27	"Episode Twenty-seven"	October 24, 2012 U (Malaysia); November 20, 2012 PG (Singapore)
28	"Episode Twenty-eight"	October 25, 2012 U (Malaysia); November 21, 2012 PG (Singapore)
29	"Episode Twenty-nine"	October 29, 2012 U (Malaysia); November 22, 2012 PG (Singapore)
30	"Episode Thirty (Finale)"	October 30, 2012 U (Malaysia); November 23, 2012 PG (Singapore)

== See also ==
- List of programmes broadcast by ntv7
- List of MediaCorp Channel 8 Chinese Drama Series (2010s)
