= Wenanita Angang =

Malaysian beauty pageant titleholder

- Born: Wenanita Wences Angang; 8 May 1996 (age 30); Kota Kinabalu, Sabah, Malaysia
- Education: Sunway University; Lancaster University BSc (Hons) Information System (Business Analytics)
- Occupation: Model
- Height: 1.75 m (5 ft 9 in)
- Beauty pageant titleholder
- Title: Miss Sabah Model of the Year 2016; Miss Planet Malaysia 2016; Unduk Ngadau Kuala Penyu 2018; Miss World Malaysia 2022
- Years active: 2016 – present
- Major competitions: Busak Mosongon 2016; (1st runner-up); Miss Sabah Model of the Year 2016; (Winner); Miss Planet International 2016; (1st runner-up); Unduk Ngadau Kuala Penyu 2018; (Winner); Miss Tourism and Culture Universe; (2nd runner-up); Miss World Malaysia 2022; (Winner); Miss World 2023; (Top 40)

Wenanita Angang (born 8 May 1996) is a Malaysian model and beauty pageant titleholder who was crowned Miss World Malaysia 2022. She represented her country at Miss World 2023.

Prior to becoming Miss World Malaysia 2022, she won Miss Planet Malaysia in 2016 and was first runner-up in Batumi, Georgia. In 2018, she won the title of Unduk Ngadau Kuala Penyu in her hometown, Sabah, Malaysia. She went on to represent Malaysia at Miss Tourism and Culture Universe 2019, where she finished as second runner-up. As the winner of Miss World Malaysia 2022, Angang represented her country at Miss World 2023, and reached the top 40.

== Pageantry ==
=== Busak Mosongon 2016 ===
Angang's first pageant was Busak Mosongon 2016. Busak Mosongon (loosely translated to mean Beautiful Flower), is a beauty contest held during the Odou Bakanjar festival, celebrated by the Tatana community in Sabah, where participants are judged by their portrayal of Tatana’s ancient and disappearing customs and practices. Here, she placed as first runner-up in her first pageant.

=== Miss Sabah Model of the Year 2016 ===
Angang entered and won Miss Sabah Model of the Year 2016, against 13 other finalists. The contest was held in Shangri-La's Tanjung Aru Resort and Spa on the 4 June 2016. The contest was established in 2011 for Sabahan women to showcase their talent in modelling as well as pageantry.

=== Miss Planet International 2016 ===
At age 20, she won Miss Planet Malaysia, at Miss Planet International 2016, held in Batumi, Georgia. she was second and received the 'Best in National Costume' award.

=== Unduk Ngadau 2018 ===
In May 2018, at the Harvest Festival, Kaamatan, held annually in the state of Sabah, she was crowned as Unduk Ngadau for the Kuala Penyu District, whereby Inanam representative, Hosiani James Jaimis, a Tambunan native, won the state level competition.

=== Miss Tourism and Culture Universe 2019 ===
In 2019 represented Malaysia at the Miss Tourism and Culture Universe 2019, on 31 August 2019 in Myanmar. She was the second runner-up.

=== Miss World Malaysia 2022 ===
Angang entered and won Miss World Malaysia 2022, on 27 August 2022 against 14 other contestants. She succeeded Dr. Lavanya Sivaji from Selangor. She became the fifth titleholder from her state to win the title of Miss World Malaysia within the period of seven years, following Brynn Zalina Lovett in Miss World Malaysia 2015.

In the final 'Question and Answer' portion, she was asked by the host, "What is the most inconvenient truth about climate change?", to which she replied:

When we step out of SICC, especially for Sabahans, you can feel the heat wave we did not feel a few years ago. So I urge everyone to not only advocate and raise awareness about climate change but actually take action on it.

During the pageant, she reached the top eight for the Beauty with a Purpose award. She represented Malaysia at Miss World 2023.

=== Miss World 2023 ===
Angang represented her country at Miss World 2023, and reached the top 40.

Awards and achievements
Preceded by Cheryl Joanne Chan	Miss Planet Malaysia; 2016	Succeeded by Viviana Winston
Preceded by Frida Fornander; Sweden	Miss Planet International (1st Runner-Up); 2016	Succeeded by Marisa Phonthirat; Thailand
Preceded by Suzziereen Helly Guan Poh	Unduk Ngadau Kuala Penyu; 2018	Succeeded by Suzayannie Guan Poh
Preceded by Lavanya Sivaji	Miss World Malaysia; 2022	Succeeded by Saroop Roshi
