= Miss World Malaysia 1963 =

- Date: 23 April 1963
- Venue: Stadium Negara, Kuala Lumpur
- Sponsor: Messrs. Detlin Overseas Pty. Ltd.
- Entrants: 30
- Placements: 11
- Winner: Catherine Loh; Brunei

Miss Malaysia 1963, the first edition of the Miss World Malaysia pageant was held on 23 April 1963, at the Stadium Negara in Kuala Lumpur. 30 candidates from all across Federation, Singapore and Borneo were expected to compete but only 11 candidates were chosen to compete in the grand finale while the remainder will be taking part in a fashion tableau in conjunction of the contest.

Catherine Loh, representing Brunei was being elected as Miss Malaysia 1963. She was crowned by French actress Capucine at the end of the event. She had been “Miss Brunei” for three consecutive years.

== Requirements ==
- Any girls from any of the Malaysian territories are able to compete;
- Ages between 17 and 27 years old.

== Results ==
Final results	Contestant
Miss Malaysia 1963	Brunei – Catherine Loh
1st Runner-Up	Singapore – Ann Woodford
2nd Runner-Up	Singapore – Alice Woon

== Judges ==
- Puan Rahah Mohamed Noah – Malaysian socialite and wife of Malaysian 2nd Prime Minister, Tun Abdul Razak Hussein
- Encik Mohamed Khir Johari – Minister of Agriculture & Co-Operatives
- Capucine – French model and actress
- William Holden – American actor
- Susannah York – English actress
- T.K. Critchley – Australian High Commissioner
- Maj. Gen. Sher Ali Khan Pataudi – Pakistani High Commissioner

== Candidates ==
24 delegates competed at Miss Malaysia 1963.

- Alice Woon, 17, Singapore
- Annabella Solomon, Kuala Lumpur
- Anita Chee, 21, Kluang
- Ann Woodford, 20, Singapore
- Carmen Smith, Kuala Lumpur
- Catherine Loh, 19, Brunei
- Diana Yong, Kuala Lumpur
- Fanny Voon, Jesselton
- Helen Lee Yoke Lin, 22, Kuala Lumpur
- Ho Nyuk Bitt, Jesselton
- Linda Foo, 20, Singapore
- Linda Tong, Kuala Lumpur
- Maria Abdulla, Singapore
- Molly Lan, Sandakan
- Molly Low, Singapore
- Mona Bird, Kuala Lumpur
- N. Selvarani, Rawang
- Olga Cornelius, Singapore
- Patricia Chan, Singapore
- Pixie Monteiro, Singapore
- Sara Abdullah, Kuala Lumpur
- Shirley Andre, Kuala Lumpur
- Susan Chiew, Ipoh
- S. Pushparani, Kuala Lumpur

== Crossovers ==
Contestants who previously competed/appeared at other international/national beauty pageants:

National competition

Miss Malaya International

- 1961 – Ann Woodford (1st Runner-Up)

State competition

Miss Melaka International

- 1961 – Ann Woodford (1st Runner-Up)

Miss Kuala Lumpur International

- 1962 – Ann Woodford (2nd Runner-Up)

Miss Brunei

- 1961 – Catherine Loh (Winner)
- 1962 – Catherine Loh (Winner)

Miss Kebaya

- 1962 – Catherine Loh (Winner)

Miss Varsity Queen Singapore

- 1963 – Alice Woon (Winner)
