= Neoma =

Neoma may refer to:

- NEOMA Business School, a French Business School
- Neoma, a genus of insects
- Lumeneo Neoma, a city electric car manufactured by Lumeneo in France
- Nyoma (or Neoma), a town in Northern India

== See also ==
- Nǐ hǎo ma? (你好嗎), a Mandarin Chinese expression written in Pinyin which means "How are you?"
- Ni Hao (disambiguation)
- Noema, a technical term in phenomenology to describe a type of thought
