= Justice in the City =

- 庭外和解
- Genre: Law
- Directed by: Sam Au; David Lau
- Starring: Shaun Chen; Chris Tong; Soo Wincci
- Opening theme: 梦想展开 By Nic Lee
- Countries of origin: Malaysia; Singapore
- Original language: Chinese
- No. of episodes: 30

Production
- Running time: 45 minutes (approx.)

Original release
- Network: ntv7 (Malaysia), Mediacorp Channel 8
- Release: 10 September – 30 October 2012

Justice In The City (庭外和解) is ntv7’s first legal drama. It stars Shaun Chen, Chris Tong and Soo Wincci as casts of this series. The thirty-episode drama revolves around a group of young lawyers. It is shown on Mediacorp Channel 8 at 7pm.

== Plot ==
The series opens with a case which sees an old couple who have been married for over fifty years, file for divorce. The wife, Chen Jin Ying, is determined to divorce her husband, Liu Fa Zhi, despite her children's objections. When her son, Liu Guo Dong realises that his mother is divorcing his father because she wanted to be with her ex-lover (an old man suffering from dementia), decides to hire Hui Qi and her boss, Luo You Wei, to prevent her from obtaining her rightful share of the family fortune. When Jian Zhi learned of Jin Ying's predicament, he decided to help her.

Meanwhile, Hui Qi's rough background is revealed in the next case, where she stands up for Gao Yong Wen, a crippled beggar who had been injured at his previous workplace, a factory. Much to Yong Wen's dismay, his company only compensated him with a small sum of money before firing him. Hui Qi is determined to help Yong Wen in his court case because he has previously supported her studies. It was through his financial support that she could afford to fulfill her ambition and graduate from law school.

When Hui Qi investigates the factory where Yong Wen's injury occurred, she finds out that it belonged to Guo Dong and decides to pursue adequate compensation for Yong Wen. Guo Dong is left with no choice but to hire Jian Zhi to fight against Hui Qi. In the midst of Jian Zhi's investigations, he discovers a shocking secret: Yong Wen had caused the death of Hui Qi's mother by stealing her money meant for her daughter's education and driving her to kill herself.

At the end of the case, Hui Qi and Jian Zhi gradually drew closer, but their love could not blossom when Jian Zhi's ex-girlfriend, He Le Er, made a return to his life. Le Er pleads for Jian Zhi's sympathy, claiming that she has been living with fear due to her husband, Luo Dong Hai's abusive behaviour. As Jian Zhi spent more time with Le Er to help her regain confidence, his relationship with Hui Qi soured. Disappointed and crushed, Hui Qi decides to accept her boss, You Wei, who has been pursuing her, despite being married to Lin Qian Yi, who is suffering from mental illness. Qian Yi is a good and faithful wife who stood by her husband through thick and thin. She even lost her dignity as a woman to fund You Wei’s studies only to be repaid with ungratefulness, which caused her to have a mental breakdown.

Later, Luo You Wei wanted to divorce and get together with Hui Qi. He filed for an appeal when Qiu Jian Zhi stopped him to do so. You Wei made much faked evidence to harm Jian Zhi and his family and was found out by Hui Qi. Hui Qi then reported to the police about Luo You Wei. Luo You Wei then became a fugitive.

== Cast ==
- Shaun Chen as Qiu Jian Zhi
- Chris Tong as Zhuo Hui Qi
- Remus Kam as Luo You Wei
- Soo Wincci as Liang Qian Yi
- Emily Lim as He Le Er
- Elvis Chin as Luo Dong Hai

== Singapore broadcast ==
- This drama would be the 22nd co-production with ntv7 after a short hiatus of about a year. The drama will be broadcast on MediaCorp Channel 8 on its premiere on 15 October 2012 right before Malaysia's ntv7 broadcasts the 21st episode. It will end on 23 November 2012 in Singapore.
- A list of episodic synopses can be found on List of Justice In The City episodes.
