= Miss World Malaysia 2013 =

- Date: 1 August 2013
- Venue: Corus Hotel, Kuala Lumpur
- Entrants: 15
- Placements: 5
- Winner: Melinder Bhullar; Kuala Lumpur
- Personality: Tan Sui Hua; Penang
- Photogenic: Jayarubini Muthaliyar; Selangor

Miss World Malaysia 2013, the 47th edition of the Miss World Malaysia pageant, was held at the Corus Hotel, Kuala Lumpur on August 1, 2014. Yvonne Lee of Selangor crowned her successor, Melinder Bhullar from Kuala Lumpur at the end of the event.

Fifteen contestants from different states competed for the crown. Melinder then represented Malaysia at the Miss World 2013 held in Bali, Indonesia where she placed as fourth runner-up for Multimedia Award.

== Results ==
Final results	Contestant
Miss Malaysia World 2013	#9 Kuala Lumpur – Melinder Bhullar
1st Runner-Up	#7 Kuala Lumpur – L'oreal Mok
2nd Runner-Up	#13 Kuala Lumpur – Tanisha Demour
3rd Runner-Up	#6 Selangor – Jayarubini Muthaliyar
4th Runner-Up	#5 Kuala Lumpur – Kim Low

== Special awards ==
Awards	Contestant
Miss Photogenic	#6 Selangor – Jayarubini Muthaliyar
Miss Personality	#14 Penang – Tan Sui Hua
Miss Beautiful Eyes	#9 Kuala Lumpur – Melinder Bhullar
Miss Beautiful Skin	#15 Penang – Venus Tan
Miss Elegance	#13 Kuala Lumpur – Tanisha Demour
Miss Fitness	#14 Penang – Tan Sui Hua
Miss Metrojaya	#9 Kuala Lumpur – Melinder Bhullar
Miss Social Media Queen	#1 Selangor – Audrey Loke
Miss Talent	#4 Johor – Coco Tan
Miss Wacoal	#9 Kuala Lumpur – Melinder Bhullar

== Contestants ==
15 contestants competed for the crown and title.

Contestant	Represented	Height	Placement	Ref
Audrey Loke Pui Yan	Shah Alam, Selangor	167 cm (5 ft 5 1/2 in)		
Brenda Cheong Ling Wei	Kuala Lumpur	161 cm (5 ft 3 1/2 in)		
Cassandra Yong	Klang, Selangor	170 cm (5 ft 7 in)		
Coco Tan	Johor Bahru, Johor	170 cm (5 ft 7 in)		
Kim Low	Kuala Lumpur	175 cm (5 ft 9 in)	4th Runner-Up	
Jayarubini Sambanthan Muthaliyar	Shah Alam, Selangor	176 cm (5 ft 9 1/2 in)	3rd Runner-Up	
L'oreal Mok Shien Leng	Kuala Lumpur	172 cm (5 ft 7 1/2 in)	1st Runner-Up	
Manpreet Kaur	Kuala Lumpur	170 cm (5 ft 7 in)		
Melinder Kaur Bhullar	Kuala Lumpur	169 cm (5 ft 6 1/2 in)	Winner	
Sharmisttha Yoogan	Kuala Lumpur	170 cm (5 ft 7 in)		
Sim Jing Yi	Melaka	169 cm (5 ft 6 1/2 in)		
Stephanie Lim	Kuala Lumpur	166 cm (5 ft 5 1/2 in)		
Tanisha Kaur Demour Harjit Singh	Kuala Lumpur	179 cm (5 ft 10 1/2 in)	2nd Runner-Up	
Tan Sui Hua	Penang	170 cm (5 ft 7 in)		
Venus Tan	Penang	165 cm (5 ft 5 in)		

=== Disqualified ===
Four Muslim contestants were disqualified from the pageant due to the fatwa which prohibit Muslim women from competing in beauty pageants.

- Wafa Johanna de Korte, Kuala Lumpur
- Sara Amellia Bernard, Perak
- Miera Sheikh, Melaka
- Kathrina Redzuan, Kuala Lumpur

=== Retreats ===
- Sherine Tan, Kuala Lumpur
