= Fugee School =

Malaysian refugee learning centre

- Logo of Fugee Org, parent organisation of Fugee School
- Founded: 2009
- Founder: Deborah Henry, Shikeen Halibullah
- Headquarters: Kuala Lumpur
- Services: Education for refugees and stateless children
- Executive Director: Deborah Henry
- Parent organization: Fugee Org
- Students: 240+
- Website: https://www.fugee.org/

Fugee School is a Malaysian alternative learning centre headquartered in Kuala Lumpur that provides access to education and social-emotional support for refugees and stateless children in Malaysia. Part of the non-profit organisation Fugee Org, the school provides kindergarten to secondary education, with supporting programmes that bridges secondary students to tertiary education, and access to IGCSE/GED exams. They also provide university scholarship programmes that opens access to higher education for eligible candidates.

The school was co-founded in 2009 by Deborah Henry, and is recognised by the UNHCR.

== History ==
After hosting a documentary in 2008 on a Somali refugee family in Kuala Lumpur, Henry began providing English and Mathematics tuition classes with university friend Shikeen Halibullah, in an effort to address the lack of access to public schools for refugees in Malaysia. In 2009, Fugee School officially opened for enrolment, receiving a large number of Somali students, and has since provided education to refugee children from Yemen, Syria, Pakistan, Myanmar, Sudan, and Palestine.

In 2017, the organisation launched the fashion brand Fugeelah, in an effort for Fugee School to eventually be self-sustainable, and to create job opportunities for their students. The brand carried designs by students and were sewn by women from marginalised communities.

In 2020, the school launched the Fugee HiEd Scholarship Programme, the only university scholarship for refugee and stateless students in Malaysia.

== Activities ==
Fugee School's efforts have provided access to better life outcomes for refugees, such as integration to daily life in Malaysia, entrepreneurial skills, and access to higher education that leads to professional employment and eventual resettlement.

An art exhibition called Artrockus was held at Menara Ken at Taman Tun Dr Ismail to showcase artwork made by students from the school.

As a fundraising effort, the school collaborated with Harriot-Watt University Malaysia to run a charity football match that raised RM6,590 in support of Fugee School.

An awareness campaign called 'Mythbusters: Jom Borak' was launched to raise awareness of lived realities faced by refugees through interactive and engaging activities with refugee students, including social media polls, quizzes, street interviews, and personal stories, as well as meeting and speaking to refugees first-hand.
