= Samantha Schubert =

Malaysian actress and model

- Born: Samantha Schubert; 23 April 1969; Kuala Lumpur, Malaysia
- Died: 25 April 2016 (aged 47); Cheras, Malaysia
- Education: Drama Studio London
- Occupations: Actress, model
- Years active: 1991–2016
- Spouse: Oliver Knott (m. 2002)
- Children: 3
- Parents: Carl Schubert (father); Datuk Dr. Paddy Bowie (mother)
- Relatives: Peter Schubert (brother); Richard Schubert (brother)

Samantha Schubert (born 23 April 1969 – 25 April 2016) was a Malaysian actress, model, and beauty pageant titleholder who won Miss Malaysia World 1991.

== Personal life ==
Samantha Schubert was born in Kuala Lumpur, Malaysia on 23 April 1969, the youngest child of Carl Schubert, and Datuk Dr. Paddy Bowie, a well-known author and political analyst. She is of British descent. She has two elder brothers, Peter Schubert who has died due to car accident in 2004, and Richard Schubert who has also died of illness in 2006.

Bowie wrote in a column for The Star that Schubert's "precocious debut" to the stage was during a visit to the Royal Palace at Sri Menanti in Negeri Sembilan: "We were in the Great Hall. The band struck up. But before the assembled adults could begin to dance, this three-year-old girl took the floor and stole the show."

She honed her talent for dance during her formative years at school in England and she remained in England for several years of her life while studying at Drama Studio London and married to a British research analyst Oliver Knotts in 2002.

She returned to Malaysia as a dancer and signed with Genting Group. Soon after, she was enlisted to join "The Girls", the dance troupe of entertainer Sudirman. However, an injury derailed Schubert's dance dreams. She then moved to Los Angeles, United States to take up acting, pursuing her study at the Lee Strasburg School of Film & Theatre Los Angeles and The Beverly Hills Playhouse.

Schubert was a successful model before starring in films such as Red Scorpion 2 (1994), Scorpion Orchid (1995), Amok (1995), and her last film appearance, The Red Kebaya (2006). Her career included several print campaigns and over 30 television commercials, including her most recognizable work for Nescafé classic TV commercial in 1995. At the time of her death, Schubert had returned to Malaysia to perform in a play produced and directed by Kedah-born actress, Susan Lankester.

== Death ==
Schubert was diagnosed with the disease in August 2015 after going in for a check-up over a persistent backache. In February 2016, Schubert was rushed to Prince Court Medical Centre, Kuala Lumpur with stomach fluid buildup due to an inoperable tumor caused by pancreatic cancer.

She remained in hospice care until her death, two days after her 47th birthday. Schubert was survived by husband Oliver Knotts, 47, and children Jodie, 12, Harry, 10 and Thomas, seven.

Funeral service was held at St. John's Cathedral. Following the service, her cortege made its way to the DBKL Crematorium in Cheras. In accordance with her final wishes, Schubert's remains was interred along with her father Carl, along with those of her brothers Richard and Peter at the Cheras cemetery.

== Filmography ==
Year	Title	Role	Notes
1994	Red Scorpion 2	Renee	
1995	Scorpion Orchid	Sally	
1995	Amok		
2006	The Red Kebaya	Davinia Reynolds	(final film role)

Awards and achievements
Preceded by (Sarawak) Vivien Chen	Miss World Malaysia; 1991	Succeeded by (Selangor) Fazira Wan Chek
