= Nadine Ann Thomas =

Malaysian actress, model, and DJ (born 1986)

- Born: Nadine Ann Thomas; 2 September 1986 (age 40)
- Beauty pageant titleholder
- Title: Miss Universe Malaysia 2010
- Hair colour: Black
- Eye colour: Black
- Major competitions: Miss Universe Malaysia 2010 (Winner); Miss Universe 2010 (Unplaced)

Nadine Ann Thomas is a Malaysian-British actress, model, DJ and beauty pageant titleholder. She was crowned Miss Universe Malaysia 2010 and competed in Miss Universe 2010.

== Career ==
Thomas is a DJ under tutelage of Malaysian hip hop artist Joe Flizzow. Thomas is the spokesperson for lingerie range Neubodi.

== Filmography ==
Year	Film	Role
2011	Nasi Lemak 2.0	Curry Daughter
2010	The 2010 Miss Universe Pageant (TV Special)	Herself
