= Saroop Roshi =

Malaysian model and beauty queen

- Occupation: Model
- Height: 1.76 m (5 ft 9 in)
- Beauty pageant titleholder
- Title: Miss World Malaysia 2023
- Years active: 2019–present
- Hair color: Dark brown
- Eye color: Brown
- Major competitions: Miss Universe Malaysia 2019; (Unplaced); Miss Grand Malaysia 2019; (1st runner-up); Miss World Malaysia 2023; (Winner); Miss World 2025; (Top 40)

Saroop Roshi is a Malaysian model and beauty pageant titleholder who won Miss World Malaysia 2023.

== Pageantry ==
Roshi competed at Miss Grand Malaysia 2019 and was first runner-up, however she did not placed at Miss Universe Malaysia 2019.

Roshi won Miss World Malaysia 2023. She became the fifth Perakian to win the title following Rosalind Kong in 1985. She represented her country at Miss World 2025 and reached the Top 40.

== Personal life ==
In 2019, Roshi created an online suicide prevention organisation called “UnmaskYourself”, to create awareness, promote prevention and intervention efforts for suicide in Malaysia. UnmaskYourself works with mental health professionals, people with lived experiences, children, and teenagers from marginalised and vulnerable communities. It was created after her own personal experience of depression after the death of her father.

Awards and achievements
Preceded by Wenanita Angang (Sabah)	Miss World Malaysia; 2023	Succeeded by Taanusiya Chetty (Kuala Lumpur)
