= Miss World Malaysia 2015 =

- Date: 29 August 2015
- Venue: Corus Hotel, Kuala Lumpur
- Entrants: 20
- Placements: 5
- Winner: Brynn Zalina Lovett; Sabah

Miss World Malaysia 2015, the 49th edition of the Miss World Malaysia pageant, was held at the Corus Hotel, Kuala Lumpur on August 29, 2015. Dewi Liana Seriestha of Sarawak crowned her successor, Brynn Zalina Lovett from Sabah at the end of the event. The main sponsors for the event was Metrojaya and Corus Hotel while the exclusive sponsor was Wacoal Malaysia.

Twenty contestants from different states competed for the crown. Brynn represented Malaysia at Miss World 2015 held in Sanya, China where she got first runner-up for Miss World Talent, Top 10 in Multimedia Award and Top 12 Dances of the World.

== Contestants ==
20 contestants competed for the crown and title.

No.	Contestant	Placement	No.	Contestant	Placement	Ref
1	Adelina Chan		11	Mae Ziele Nyara Joseph		
2	Annie Kok		12	Melinda Lee Chen Ling	2nd Runner-Up	
3	Beatrice Lee		13	Narishma Tiwari Karam Shankar		
4	Brynn Zalina Lovett	Winner	14	Natasha Aprillia Benggon	4th Runner-Up	
5	Catherine Chow Kit May	3rd Runner-Up	15	Pareesha Nayar		
6	Crystal Wang		16	Santhawan Dew Boonratana		
7	Dhiva Sakti Yogandran		17	Serene Chai Yong Bin	1st Runner-Up	
8	Diana Sim Siew Ling		18	Shindy Kua Xin Yi		
9	Ellie Elyana		19	Summer Chia Youn Khoon		
10	Grace Yan Hui Xin		20	Venagary Veena Rajee		

== Judges ==
The following served as judges on the coronation night of Miss Malaysia World 2015:

- Melinder Bhullar – Miss Malaysia World 2013
- Jovian Mandagie – Fashion designer
- Dato Julie Lim Chew Ching – House of Tatiana founder and owner
- Takashi Watanabe – Executive Director of Wacoal Malaysia
- Joyce Sit – President of Laura Ashley (Asia)
