= Nadia Heng =

Malaysian model (born 1985)

- Born: Nadia Heng Min Dern; 16 June 1985 (age 41); Port Dickson, Negeri Sembilan, Malaysia
- Occupations: TV host, emcee, model, actress
- Height: 1.68 m (5 ft 6 in)
- Beauty pageant titleholder
- Title: Miss World Malaysia 2010
- Hair colour: Brown
- Major competitions: Miss World 2010 (Unplaced)

Chinese name
- Chinese: 邢敏敦
Transcriptions
Standard Mandarin
- Hanyu Pinyin: Xíng Mǐndūn
Yue: Cantonese
- Jyutping: Jing4 Man5 Deon1
Southern Min
- Hokkien POJ: Hêng Bín-tun

Nadia Heng Min Dern (Chinese: 邢敏敦; born 16 June 1985) is a Malaysian beauty pageant titleholder and model who won Miss World Malaysia 2010 and represented Malaysia at Miss World 2010 on 30 October in China.

== Early life ==
Heng was born in Port Dickson, Negeri Sembilan, to a Chinese father and English mother. She has a fraternal twin sister Natalie who was born a minute before her. Her father used to work in Port Dickson's hotel industry before his retirement and her mother is an administrator at a nursing home in England. Heng has appeared in more than 20 TV commercials and print advertisements, among them jobs for Spritzer and Gintell.

== Personal life ==
Heng graduated with a degree in communications from Universiti Sains Malaysia in 2006 and used to work as a public relations manager. She is now a professional emcee and host for some of the biggest brands. She loves reading, running, singing, swimming and travelling. She told the interviewer that her Personal Motto is ‘Life is a self-fulfilling prophecy. Learn to live, enjoy the moment.

Heng describes herself as a versatile, determined, sociable and diligent person. She says that her future ambition is to have a successful accessories and clothing line. In college, Heng received the best student award during her diploma in public relations. She is fluent in English, Mandarin Chinese, and Malay.

== Career ==
Heng competed in the Miss World Malaysia 2010 and won the title. She then represented Malaysia in the Miss World 2010 held in Sanya, China, but was unplaced.

Heng appeared in two Malay-language films in 2013: the action film Langgar and the romantic comedy Lemak Kampung Santan. In 2014 she became a co-host of the 8TV talk show G-Thang. She subsequently founded her own company Be Spoke to offer her services as a master of ceremonies.
