= Lavanya Sivaji =

Malaysian model and beauty pageant

- Born: Lavanya Sivaji; 16 May 1996 (age 30); Batu Caves, Selangor, Malaysia
- Education: National Defence University of Malaysia
- Occupations: Doctor; model; beauty pageant titleholder
- Height: 1.73 m (5 ft 8 in)
- Beauty pageant titleholder
- Title: Miss World Malaysia 2021
- Years active: 2021–present
- Hair colour: Black
- Eye colour: Dark brown
- Major competitions: Miss World Malaysia 2021 (Winner); Miss World 2022 (Top 40)

Lavanya Sivaji (born 16 May 1996) is a Malaysian doctor and beauty pageant titleholder. She was crowned Miss World Malaysia 2021, and was selected to represent Malaysia at Miss World 2022.

== Personal life ==
Lavanya was born in Batu Caves, Selangor, Malaysia. She is of Indian descent and her great grandparents migrated from Tamil Nadu, India to Malaysia. She speaks three languages, Tamil, Malay, and English. In 2005, she moved from Taman Seri Gombak to Rawang, Selangor. From 2009 to 2013, she attended SMK Seri Garing Rawang & completed her foundation studies in Kolej Matrikulasi Kedah. In 2015, she enrolled at the National Defence University of Malaysia in Kuala Lumpur, Malaysia to pursue her medical degree. She is the leader and founder of 4Them, a Malaysian advocacy and fundraising project based on the Orang Asli community's health and nutrition issues.

== Pageantry ==
=== Miss Malaysia Indian Global 2019 ===
She competed at Miss Malaysia Indian Global in 2019 held in Petaling Jaya, Selangor where she ended up as the third runner-up and was also awarded the subsidiary title, Miss Web Popular.

=== Miss World Malaysia 2021 ===
On October 16, 2021, she competed against 36 other candidates from all across Malaysia in a virtual contest of Miss World Malaysia 2021. At the end of the pageant, she succeeded 2019 Miss World Malaysia, Alexis Sue-Ann Seow. She was also the winner of the Head to Head challenge. Lavanya was an underdog winner as she competed and won against pageant veterans, and famous figures in Malaysian pageantry. She represented Malaysia at the 70th Miss World pageant in San Juan, Puerto Rico.

=== Miss World 2021 ===
In November & December 2021, she participated in the 70th Miss World pageant in San Juan, Puerto Rico and her intelligence & poise while answering questions during the Head to Head Challenge astounded many. Prior finals, she was recognized by many international pageant portals & was listed as a hot pick. Two days before the scheduled finals on 16 December 2021, Lavanya along with many other contestants & Miss World crew members were tested positive for COVID-19. The finals of Miss World was then postponed to 16 March 2022. She then made Malaysia proud by reaching the Top 40 quarter-finalists in Miss World 2022 based on judges' choice, making her the first Malaysian representative to make it into Miss World quarter-finalists through judges' selection since 2018. She also managed to get into Top 27 semifinalist for the Beauty with a Purpose (BWAP) fast track with her 4Them project.

Awards and achievements
Preceded by Alexis Sue-Ann Seow	Miss World Malaysia; 2021	Succeeded by Wenanita Angang
