= Thanuja Ananthan =

Malaysian model and beauty queen (born 1985)

- தநுஜா ஆநந்தன்
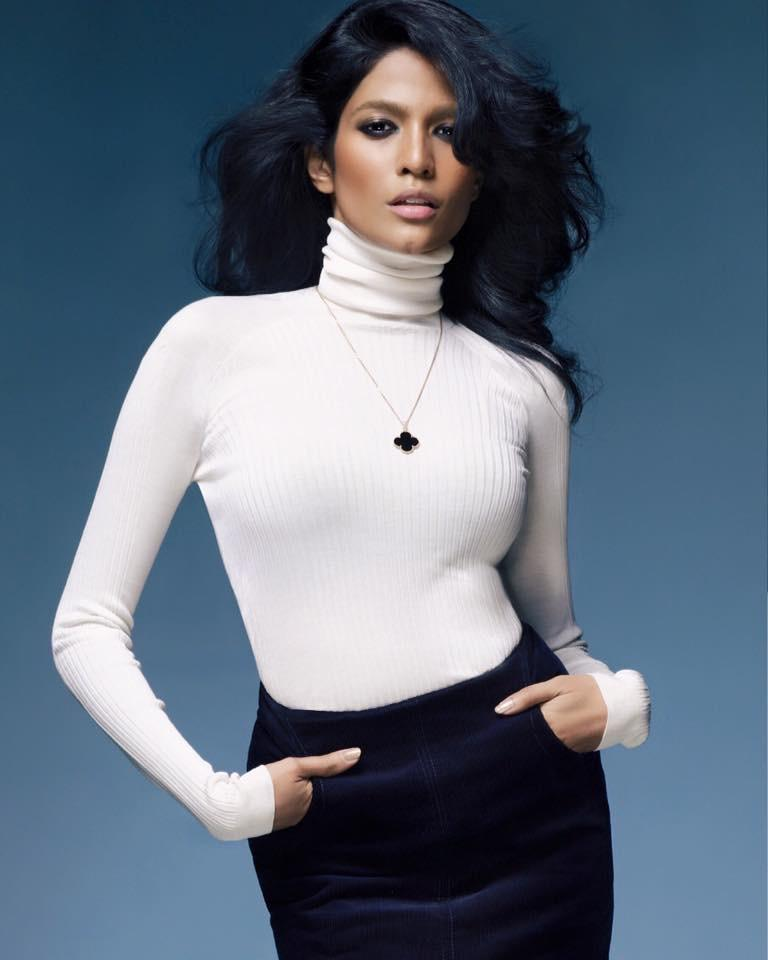
- Born: Thanuja Ananthan; 31 August 1985 (age 41); Kuala Lumpur, Malaysia
- Height: 1.83 m (6 ft 0 in)
- Beauty pageant titleholder
- Title: Miss World Malaysia 2009
- Hair colour: Black
- Eye colour: Black
- Major competitions: Miss World 2009 (Unplaced); 2014 Asia Model Award Star Prize

Thanuja Ananthan (Tamil: தநுஜா ஆநந்தன்; born 31 August 1985) is a Malaysian model and beauty pageant titleholder who was crowned as Miss World Malaysia 2009 and represented her country at the Miss World 2009.

== Career ==
=== Miss World Malaysia 2009 ===
Ananthan was crowned as Miss World Malaysia 2009 by the outgoing Miss World Malaysia 2008, Soo Wincci. Eighteen contestants vied for the crown.

=== Miss World 2009 ===
Anathan represented Malaysia at the Miss World 2009 which was held at Johannasburg, South Africa. She competes with 120 delegates from around the world.

=== Achievements in the Miss World 2009 ===
- Miss world Top Model (Top 12): The first Miss Malaysia to be a finalist in this category.
- Miss World Beach Beauty (Top 40)
- Miss World Beauty With A purpose (Top 20): The first Miss Malaysia to make it into the top 20 for this category with her video of her passion & involvement in START Foundation.

=== Acting career ===
Thanuja is also active in acting. She started her professional acting career through the crime thriller Temuan Takdir which was released on 11 August 2016. She later acted with Remy Ishak and Elvis Chin in the six-episode patriotic drama, Anak Merdeka, which aired on all Astro channels from 26 to 31 August 2017; Thanuja plays the role of Devi. She became the main star alongside Kilafairy, Erwin Dawson, Cristina Suzanne and Hefny Sahad in the mystery drama series, Nafas on ntv7 where she played the role of Trisya.

== Filmography ==
- MasterChef Selebriti Malaysia (2012)
- Temuan Takdir (2016)
- Anak Merdeka (2017)
- Best in Town (2017)
- Festival Filem Malaysia ke-29 (2017)
- Nafas (2018)
- DM Hati Awak (2018)
- All Together Now Malaysia (2021–2023)
- Murder By Moonlight (2022)
- PADU (coming Sept 2023)
