= Dewi Liana Seriestha =

Malaysian artist, actress, and model

- Born: Dewi Liana Yudhi Seriestha; 7 September 1989 (age 37); Kuching, Sarawak, Malaysia
- Education: Akademi Seni Budaya Dan Warisan Kebangsaan (ASWARA)
- Occupations: Singer; songwriter; actress; model; beauty pageant titleholder
- Height: 1.80 m (5 ft 11 in)
- Beauty pageant titleholder
- Title: Miss World Malaysia 2014; Miss World Talent 2014
- Years active: 2005–2010; 2014–present
- Hair colour: Black
- Eye colour: Black
- Major competitions: Miss World Malaysia 2014 (Winner); Miss World 2014 (Top 25)
- Musical career
- Genre: Pop
- Instrument: Vocals
- Labels: Warner Music Malaysia; Hikayat Records; Dewi Nation Empire

Dewi Liana Seriestha (born 7 September 1989) is a Malaysian singer, model and beauty pageant titleholder who was crowned Miss Malaysia World 2014. She represents her country at Miss World 2014 at London, England where she placed as one of the Top 25 quarter-finalist and also became the first Malaysian to win the Miss World Talent award.

== Early life ==
Seriestha was born in Kuching city centre but hails from Kampung Tematu, which is a residential neighbourhood in the Padawan suburban area of the city outside city limits.

Her father, Yudhi Seriestha is an Indonesian musician and singer of Chinese descent while her mother Catherine Noep Sigit is a Malaysian Bidayuh singer. She is the third of four siblings. She come second in a national singing competition, Bintang Kecil RTM in 2000. In 2005, she moved to Kuala Lumpur with her parents to pursue her career. Seriestha graduated from National Academy of Arts, Culture and Heritage (ASWARA) in November 2015.

== Career ==
=== 2005–2010: Mentor and Miss Fair and Lovely World Harvest Festival 2010 ===
In 2005, Seriestha made her national television debut in a singing competition, Mentor, which was aired on TV3. She was only 16 and was the youngest finalist of the show. Seriestha also ventured into acting. In 2009–2010, she acted for Malay drama, Kembali, Nilai Cinta Diana and Patung Cinta for Radio Televisyen Malaysia.

In 2010, she joined a Sarawak-based beauty pageant Miss Fair & Lovely World Harvest Festival where she finished as first runner up and also a subsidiary title for Miss Talent.

=== 2014–2016: World Championships of Performing Arts, Miss World 2014 and first single ===
In 2014, Seriestha was chosen to represent Malaysia at World Championships of Performing Arts. She won the gold medal for classical opera, three silver medals for contemporary, world music and variety category (vocal), a special accolade under Industry Award and a medal for classical champion of WCOPA. In August 2014, she was crowned as Miss World Malaysia 2014 at Corus Hotel, Kuala Lumpur where she had the rights to be the representative for Malaysia in Miss World 2014 held in London. She won the Miss World Talent title and was named one of the Top 25 quarter-finalist.

During the Eid al-Fitr in 2015, Seriestha joined other 10 celebrities for a charity show held in Kuching, Sarawak alongside Malaysian pop diva, Ziana Zain for the show "Aidilfitri with Ziana Zain & Friends".

On 4 September 2015, Seriestha releases her first single, Hati Telah Dimiliki on Spotify and iTunes. The single is the theme song for a TV3 series, Waris Kasih.

In November 2015, she was awarded Asia Outstanding Achievement Award during the Asia Golden Dragon Awards 2015/2016 for her series of achievements during the WCOPA as well as the Miss World 2014.

She performed at the national-level Chinese New Year open house at Sibu Town Square in February 2016. The event was attended by the then Prime Minister of Malaysia, Najib Razak. In July 2016, she announced that her second single is still in the works and she would be signing with Warner Music Malaysia. She composed the single herself.

In December 2016, She performed at the national-level Christmas open house at Pavilion Kuala Lumpur alongside David Arumugam, Cassidy Anderson and Michael Leaner. The event was attended by the then Deputy Prime Minister of Malaysia, Ahmad Zahid Hamidi, Tourism and Culture Minister Mohamed Nazri Abdul Aziz, Transport Minister Liow Tiong Lai and Human Resources Minister Richard Riot Anak Jaem

=== 2017–present: Second single, new label and first English single ===
Seriestha's second single, "Seindah Berdua" was released to digital platforms such as iTunes, Apple Music and Spotify on 20 January 2017, under Warner Music Malaysia. In May 2017, she was chosen as the icon and a keynote speaker for International Dayak Culture Day in Bengkayang Regency, Indonesia. She was also crowned as The Most Beautiful Dayak Woman during the Dayak Culture Day 2017.

In July 2018, she performed in a musical theater, Sarawak: An Indigenous Journey. The musical theater is held in conjunction with the second edition of Rainforest Fringe Festival, a run-up to the Rainforest World Music Festival.

In October 2018, it was announced that her single "Seindah Berdua" has advanced into the semi-finals of the 33rd Anugerah Juara Lagu.

Seriestha's first English single, "I Love You" was released on 1 February 2019. The song was co-written by herself and Mark Woods. The music video for the single was released on YouTube on 24 April 2019.

In June 2019, she performed alongside Dennis Lau, Namewee, Aisyah Aziz, Jeryl Lee, Lee Elaine, Jimmy Sax, Dennis Yin, NAMA, and Fara Dolhadi for The Chosen by Dennis Lau & Friends Concert held at Mega Star Arena, Kuala Lumpur. The concert represents the start of Lau's Give Back movement in collaboration with Teach For Malaysia (TFM).

== Other ventures ==
=== Product endorsements ===
In October 2015, Seriestha signed a two-year contract as an ambassador with Furley Bioextracts range of Mangosteen products for Spray8 Wound Care, Beaute & Ostania.

== Discography ==
=== Singles ===
==== As lead artist ====
Year	Title	Album	Notes
2015	"Hati Telah Dimiliki"	Non-album single	Theme song for drama series, Waris Kasih.
2017	"Seindah Berdua"	Non-album single	Composed by Dewi Seriestha herself.
2019	"I Love You"	Non-album single	First English single.
2021	"Satu Petanda"	Non-album single	Composed by Rudi Muhammad and released by Hikayat Records.
2023	"Cinta Abadi" (featuring Anding Indrawani)	Non-album single	Composed by herself and launched on Valentine's Day.
2024	"Melodiku"	Non-album single	Released on 31 March 2024.
2026	"Andai Saja"	Non-album single	Released on 10 May 2026.
2026	"Negeriku" (featuring Yudhi Seriestha)	Non-album single	Composed by her father, Yudhi Seriestha in 2000, when she was just 11 years old and represented Sarawak in the national-level Bintang Kecil singing competition organised by Radio Televisyen Malaysia (RTM).

==== As featured artist ====
Year	Title	Artist	Album	Notes
2006	"Puteri Santubong"	M.I.X	Mula Dari Dulu	Rendition of Sarawak folk song, "Puteri Santubong".
2019	"Esok"	劉凱彥 (Dennis Lau)	Single	Alongside Natalie, Jade, Dash, Aisyah Aziz, Fara Dolhadi, Jeryl Lee, Lee Elaine, Dania Hidayah, Razin Aiman, Nursyasya Batrisyia, Stacy Jean, Chyme and Varsha.
2020	"Hello Borneo"	TUJU (K-Clique)	Single	

==== Promotional singles ====
Year	Title	Notes
2018	"Undilah" (with Andi Bernadee, Bella Nazari & Wan Shahjuddin)	The rendition was recorded in conjunction with the 14th General Election.

=== Music videos ===
Title	Year	Director
"Hati Telah Dimiliki"	2015	Maddha Fahmi
"Seindah Berdua"	2017	Abu
"I Love You"	2019	Seha Mso
"Cinta Abadi" (featuring Anding Indrawani)	2023	Yudhi Seriestha

=== Concerts and tours ===
==== As supporting act ====
- "Dennis Lau & Friends: The Chosen Concert", Mega Star Arena, Kuala Lumpur (2019)
- "Bersama Merentas Zaman Concert" by Petronas, KLCC Plaza, Kuala Lumpur (2019)
- "Konsert Hari Wanita Sedunia" (International Women's Day Concert), Auditorium DBKL, Kuala Lumpur (2020)
- "Sarawak's Diva Duo: Dewi & Jolynn In Concert", TVS, Kuching (2022)
- "2022 Citrawarna Keluarga Malaysia Concert", Kuching Waterfront, Kuching (2022)
- "I Want To Break Free! Queen Tribute Concert", Borneo Convention Centre Kuching, Kuching (2022)

== Filmography ==
Film and television
Year	Title	Role	Channel	Notes
2005	Mentor	Contestant	TV3	Mentor is a talent reality show.
2016	Kamek Sayang Sarawak (We Love Sarawak)	Host	TV3	
2017	Selamat Pagi Malaysia	Herself	RTM TV1	Guest for "Santai Selebriti" segment.
2020	Selamat Pagi Malaysia	Herself	RTM TV1	Special appearance in conjunction with Gawai Dayak and Kaamatan festival.
2020	The JayC Show	Herself	TVS	Guest star for Episode 12 of the talk show.
2021	Nadi Seni	Herself	TVS	Featured star for Episode 4.
2021	Nota di Kota – Season 1	Host	TVS	Host for the 13-episode talk show featuring various celebrities.
2021	TVSTARZ	Herself	TVS	Vocal coach for the reality show.
2022	Solo Traveler: Outback Sabah	Host	TV Okey	13-episode travel documentary.

== Theater credits ==
Year	Production	Role	Venue	Dates	Notes
2016	Mulan	Maharani	Auditorium DBKL	15–17 April 2016	Performed "Reflection".
2019	Gemilang Sebuah Muzikal		Auditorium DBKL	13–15 December 2019	Main role.
2021	Putri Santubong – The Warrior Princess	Putri Sejinjang	Sarawak Cultural Village	11–12 December 2021	Staged at Sarawak Cultural Village and screened virtually.
2024	Puteri Hang Li Po Musical Theatre	Puteri Hang Li Po	Encore Melaka	3 - 6 October 2024	Produced by Istana Budaya, the special musical celebrated 50 years of diplomatic ties between Malaysia and China.

== Awards and nominations ==
Year	Award	Category	Nominated work	Result	Reference
2015	Asia Golden Dragon Awards 2015/2016	Asia Outstanding Achievement Award	Herself	Won	
2015	Swinas Inspirational Award by UMNO's Women's Youth Wing	Cultural	Herself	Won	
2015	Pekema (Vehicle Importers Association) Sarawak	Outstanding Achievement Award	Herself	Won	
2017	International Dayak Culture Day	The Most Beautiful Dayak Woman	Herself	Won	
2018	McM Rising Stars McMillan Woods Global Awards	Vocalist Extraordinaire of the Year	Herself	Won	
2018	Anugerah Juara Lagu	–	"Seindah Berdua"	Semi-finalist	
2018	Ngarum Lagu Bidayuh (NLB) (Bidayuh Music Awards)	Special Bidayuh Artistes and Musicians Association (Bama) Award	Herself	Won	
2020	World Championship of Performing Arts Malaysia	Meritocracy Award	Herself	Won	
2023	Dayak Icons Award	The Most Talented Dayak Beauty Queen of the Century	Herself	Won	
2023	The 4th World Excellence Entrepreneur Brand Celebrity Awards	Malaysia Excellence Celebrity Award	Herself	Won	
2025	Global Institute for Leadership & Management (GLIMS) International Excellence Awards	Crown of Beauty, Culture and Talent Ambassador Award 2025	Herself	Won	
2026	Sarawak Bidayuh Graduates Association (BGA) Excellence Awards	Excellence Award - Entertainment	Herself	Won	

== General sources ==
- Yayasan John Jinep (2017). Dewi Liana Seriestha: A Portrait in Words and Pictures. Kuching, Sarawak: Dayak Bidayuh National Association. ISBN 9789832981176. OCLC 1076419152.

Awards and achievements
Preceded by Melinder Bhullar	Miss Malaysia World; 2014	Succeeded by Brynn Lovett
Preceded by (Indonesia) Vania Larissa	Miss World Talent; 2014	Succeeded by (Guyana) Lisa Punch
