= Alexis SueAnn =

Malaysian model, blogger and beauty queen

- Born: Alexis SueAnn Seow Su Yin; 6 February 1995 (age 31); Selangor, Malaysia
- Education: Degree in Psychology
- Occupations: Beauty pageant titleholder; social media influencer; fashion blogger; fitness model; emcee
- Height: 1.72 m (5 ft 8 in)
- Beauty pageant titleholder
- Title: Miss World Malaysia 2019
- Years active: 2015–present
- Hair color: Dark Brown
- Eye color: Dark Brown
- Major competitions: Miss Universe Malaysia 2018 (1st Runner-up); Miss World Malaysia 2019 (Winner); Miss World 2019 (Top 40)

Alexis SueAnn (born 6 February 1995) is a Malaysian model, fashion blogger, and beauty pageant titleholder who was crowned Miss World Malaysia 2019. She represented Malaysia at Miss World 2019, where she placed in the Top 40.

== Personal life ==
Alexis is a Malaysian Chinese hailed from Selangor. She has a bachelor's degree in psychology. In 2015, she became the youngest female weekday radio announcer at Hitz, after winning the Hitz Announcer Search. She also used to be a rover host for some of 8TV's Quickie segments. She is eloquent in Bahasa Melayu, English, Mandarin Chinese and Cantonese.

== Career ==
=== Pageantry ===
Miss Universe Malaysia 2018

In 2018, she competed in the Miss Universe Malaysia 2018 and was named as the first runner-up of the pageant.

Miss World Malaysia 2019

Alexis was crowned Miss World Malaysia 2019 as well as winning the Miss Talent, People's Choice and Beauty with a Purpose subsidiary awards at the Mega Star Arena, in Kuala Lumpur on 6 October 2019. She succeeded outgoing Miss World Malaysia 2018, Larissa Ping.

In the final question and answer round, Alexis was asked what would something that she wish to change about the world. She answered:

"Overall, I would like to change how we view each other, to have social acceptance in general, as a lot of people are not respecting each other and there are a lot bullies online especially."

Miss World 2019

As Miss World Malaysia 2019, she represented Malaysia at Miss World 2019, which was held at ExCeL London, London, United Kingdom in December 2019, where she advanced into the top 40 quarter-finalists. She automatically advanced to the top 40 after her "Beauty with a Purpose" project was placed amongst the top 10. Besides, she was also placed in the top 27 for Miss World Talent and she was also one of the favorite to win the Multimedia Award via Miss World website as she placed in the top 10. At the end of the pageant, Toni-Ann Singh of Jamaica was crowned as Miss World 2019.

== Humanitarian works ==
Alexis passion in humanitarian works started when she was young. Since twelve years old, she would follow her mother who worked for a foundation to old folks' and children's home regularly. When she was sixteen, she together with her mother and other volunteers, including Thanuja Ananthan, Miss World Malaysia 2009 participated in the "Climb of Hope", an expedition to scale Mount Kinabalu and successfully raised RM 50,000 for the National Cancer Society of Malaysia (NCSM).

As her Beauty with a Purpose project, she initiated a project of her own, #Chance4Change. The project, a collaboration with Orphancare Foundation, aims to focus on providing awareness and education on baby dumping, and sexual grooming for youths in colleges as well as sustainable income solution for teen and single mothers.

Awards and achievements
| Preceded by Dana Low | Miss Universe Malaysia 2018 (1st Runner-up); 2018 | Succeeded by Frost Yaw |
| Preceded by Larissa Ping | Miss World Malaysia; 2019 | Succeeded by Lavanya Sivaji |
