= Miss World Malaysia 2014 =

- Date: 30 August 2014
- Venue: Corus Hotel, Kuala Lumpur
- Entrants: 21
- Placements: 5
- Winner: Dewi Liana Seriestha; Sarawak
- Personality: Dewi Liana Seriestha; Sarawak
- Photogenic: Dhivya Suppiah; Kuala Lumpur

Miss World Malaysia 2014, the 48th edition of the Miss World Malaysia pageant, was held at the Corus Hotel, Kuala Lumpur on August 30, 2014. Melinder Bhullar of Kuala Lumpur crowned her successor, Dewi Liana Seriestha from Sarawak at the end of the event.

Twenty-one contestants from different states competed for the crown. Dewi then represented Malaysia at the Miss World 2014 held in London, United Kingdom where she received the Miss World Talent 2014 award and made it to the Top 25 quarter-finalist.

== Results ==
Final results	Contestant
Miss Malaysia World 2014	#6 Sarawak – Dewi Liana Seriestha
1st Runner-Up	#2 Putrajaya – Bob Low
2nd Runner-Up	#3 Sabah – Cassandra Jeremiah
3rd Runner-Up	#7 Kuala Lumpur – Dhivya Suppiah
4th Runner-Up	#13 Kuala Lumpur – Olivia Shyan

== Special awards ==
Awards	Contestant
Miss Photogenic	#7 Kuala Lumpur – Dhivya Suppiah
Miss Personality	#6 Sarawak – Dewi Liana Seriestha
Miss Beautiful Hair	#19 Selangor – Sue Thang
Miss Elegance	#4 Sabah – Cheryl Joanne Chan
Miss Fitness	#3 Sabah – Cassandra Jeremiah
Miss Metrojaya	#2 Putrajaya – Bob Low
Miss Natural Beauty	#10 Melaka – Lisa Lau
Miss Social Media Queen	#3 Sabah – Cassandra Jeremiah
Miss Talent	#6 Sarawak – Dewi Liana Seriestha
Miss Wacoal	#2 Putrajaya – Bob Low
Miss Dr. Alice Award	#6 Sarawak – Dewi Liana Seriestha

== Contestants ==
21 contestants competed for the crown and title.

Contestant	Represented	Height	Placement
Amelia Tan Shei Shen	Kangar, Perlis	167 cm (5 ft 5 1/2 in)	
Bob Low Sze Yie	Putrajaya	175 cm (5 ft 9 in)	1st Runner-Up
Cassandra Devi Jeremiah	Penampang, Sabah	173 cm (5 ft 8 in)	2nd Runner-Up
Cheryl Joanne Chan Fan Nyuk	Kota Kinabalu, Sabah	165 cm (5 ft 5 in)	
Claire Chin	Kuching, Sarawak	161 cm (5 ft 3 1/2 in)	
Dewi Liana Seriestha	Bau, Sarawak	180 cm (5 ft 11 in)	Winner
Dhivya Dhyana Suppiah	Kuala Lumpur	175 cm (5 ft 9 in)	
Esther Chiew Yen Qi	Kinta, Perak	167 cm (5 ft 5 1/2 in)	
Gurmesh Dhillon	Ipoh, Perak	166 cm (5 ft 5 1/2 in)	
Lisa Lau Li Ling	Melaka City, Melaka	167 cm (5 ft 5 1/2 in)	
Mabel Marshall	Kuala Lumpur	159 cm (5 ft 2 1/2 in)	
Mico Pun Chiew Yeok	Johor Bahru, Johor	168 cm (5 ft 6 in)	
Olivia Shyan	Kuala Lumpur	168 cm (5 ft 6 in)	4th Runner-Up
Ooi Ning	Seremban, Negeri Sembilan	167 cm (5 ft 5 1/2 in)	
Rebecca Soh	Kuala Lumpur	168 cm (5 ft 6 in)	
Ruth Jacob	Kuala Lumpur	165 cm (5 ft 5 in)	
Sabrina Chan	Ipoh, Perak	165 cm (5 ft 5 in)	
Shanti Poorrenee Ganasalingam	Kuantan, Pahang	170 cm (5 ft 7 in)	
Thang Sue Sien	Shah Alam, Selangor	175 cm (5 ft 9 in)	
Tracey Isabella Lovett	Beaufort, Sabah	170 cm (5 ft 7 in)	
Vidiana Dannis	Kajang, Selangor	173 cm (5 ft 8 in)	
