= Rahima Orchient Yayah =

Malaysian businesswoman

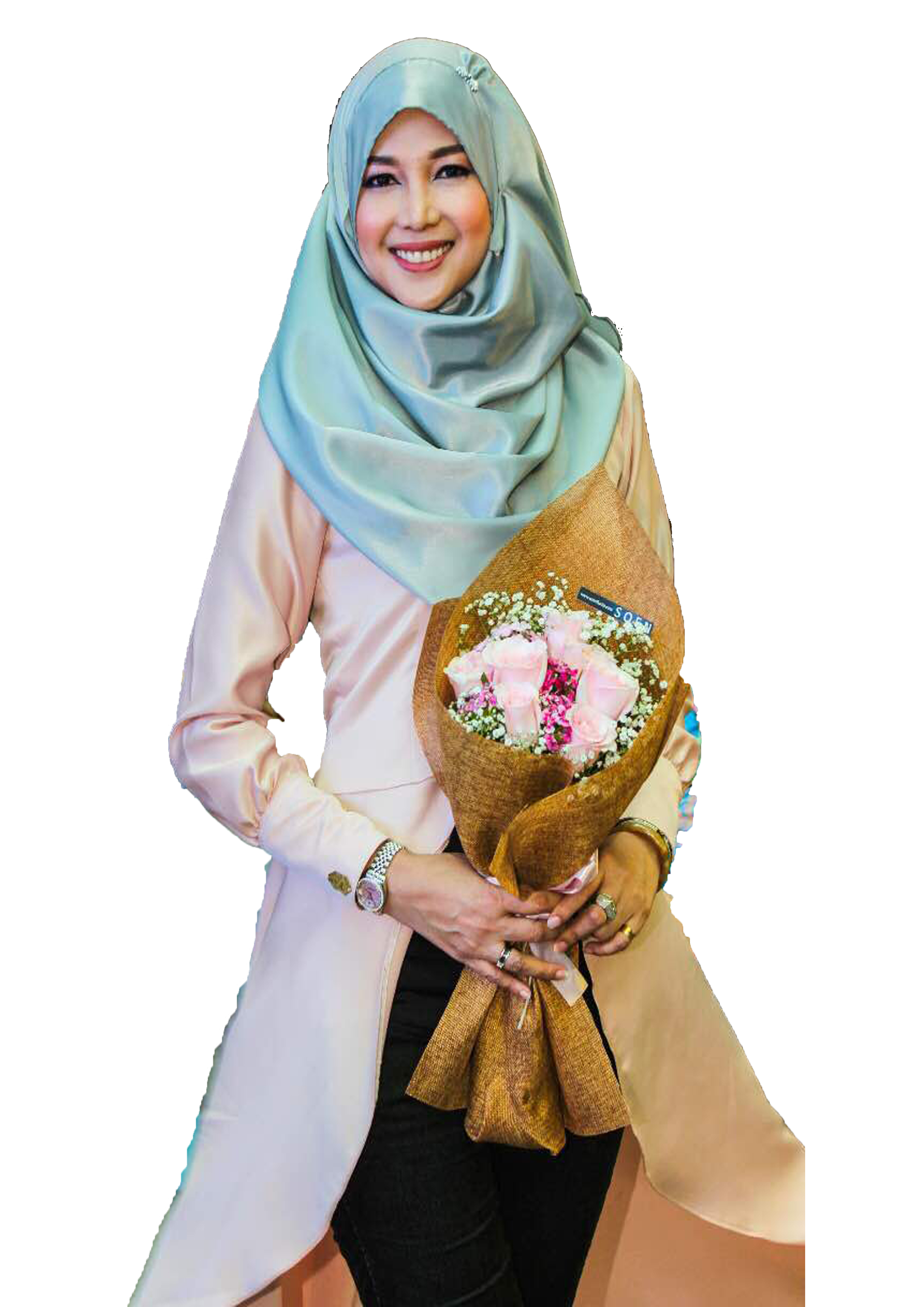
- Born: Rahima binti Yayah; 1974 (age 51–52); Tawau, Sabah, Malaysia
- Education: Preston University
- Occupations: Model; businesswoman; fashion designer; beauty pageant titleholder
- Height: 5 ft 8.5 in (1.74 m)
- Children: 2
- Beauty pageant titleholder
- Title: Miss World Malaysia 1994
- Hair colour: Dark brown
- Eye colour: Black
- Major competitions: Miss Malaysia World 1994 (Winner); Miss World 1994 (Top 10)

Rahima Orchient Yayah (born 1974) is a Malaysian businesswoman, former model and beauty pageant titleholder who was crowned as Miss Malaysia World 1994. She represented Malaysia in Miss World 1994 pageant in Sun City, South Africa where she placed in the top 10 semi-finalists.

== Personal life ==
Born in 1974, in Tawau, Sabah. She was married to a Malaysian Chinese businessman where she had 2 sons. She received a diploma in business administration from Inti College in 1993 and Pitman Training certificate for secretarial work from Kinabalu Commercial College, Sabah in 1989.

== Career ==
While representing Malaysia to Miss World 1994, she managed to reach the top 10 semi-finalist. She was then defeated by Aishwarya Rai, a model and an actress hailed from India. She was the third Malaysian representative to qualify into the semi-finalist since the country debut in 1963. The last time Malaysia made into the semi-final was in Miss World 1979 through Shirley Chew. Her participation in the competition marked in the history of major beauty pageant in Malaysia as the last Muslim woman to ever compete in Miss World pageant after the 1996 fatwa banning Muslim women from competing in any national pageant that sends the winner to an international pageant.

She holds a Master of Business Administration from Preston University. She started and helmed her own fashion design company at the age of 28. She envisioned to make her company to be one of the top firm in the fashion designing and patterning industry. She have made two boutique branches which is in Tawau and Wisma Muis HQ ground floor and Karamunsing Complex at Kota Kinabalu.

Awards and achievements
Preceded by (Sarawak) Jacqueline Ngu	Miss World Malaysia; 1994	Succeeded by (Penang) Trincy Low
