= Brynn Zalina Lovett =

Malaysian dancer, swimming instructor and beauty pageant titleholder

- Born: Brynn Zalina Lovett; 28 February 1993 (age 33); Beaufort, Sabah, Malaysia
- Education: Taylor's University
- Height: 1.70 m (5 ft 7 in)
- Beauty pageant titleholder
- Title: Miss World Malaysia 2015
- Hair colour: Black
- Eye colour: Brown
- Major competitions: Miss World Malaysia 2015 (Winner); Miss World 2015 (Unplaced)

Brynn Zalina Lovett (born 28 February 1993) is a Malaysian dancer, swimming instructor and beauty pageant titleholder. She was crowned as Miss Malaysia World 2015 by her predecessor, Dewi Liana Seriestha at the pageant's grand finals in Corus Hotel, Kuala Lumpur on 29 August 2015.

== Early life ==
Lovett's father is an Australian of Scottish descent, while her mother is Murut. She has a twin sister named Tracey Isabella Lovett, who was a finalist at Miss Malaysia World 2014 which inspired her to participate the following year. She holds a Foundation in Communications from Taylor's University.

== Career ==
=== Pageantry ===
Miss World Malaysia 2015

Aside from winning the eventual title, Lovett also won three subsidiary titles; Miss Talent, Miss Wacoal and Miss Fitness.

Miss World 2015

Lovett represented Malaysia at Miss World 2015 competition which was held in Sanya, China on 19 December 2015. Although she was unplaced, she finished as 1st runner-up for Miss World Talent, top 10 for the Multimedia Award & top 11 for the Dances of the World.

=== Acting career ===
Lovett played a small part in the 2018 musical, Ola Bola The Musical, which is based on the movie of the same name.

== Charitable works ==
Lovett started Dance for Hope, a charity competition that raises treatment funds for child cancer patients, in collaboration with the National Cancer Council Malaysia (MAKNA). The project was Lovett's Beauty With A Purpose project, and is a tribute to her father who died from cancer when she was fifteen.

Awards and achievements
Preceded by Dewi Liana Seriestha	Miss Malaysia World; 2015	Succeeded by Tatiana Kumar
