= Mr. Siao's Mandarin Class =

- 你好 Mr. Siao
- Genre: Comedy
- Directed by: Berg Lee Seng Wan
- Starring: Auguste Kwan Teik Hooi; Kee Thuan Chye; Soo Wincci; Loo Aye Keng; Elvanna Raine; Steve Yap; Ling Tang; Tony Ong; Alvin Wong; Baki Zainal; Chai Jen; Ramasundran Rengan; Cindy Chen
- Opening theme: "Ni Hao, Mr Siao" by Auguste Kwan
- Ending theme: "Ni Hao, Mr Siao" by Auguste Kwan
- Country of origin: Malaysia
- Original languages: Mandarin; Hokkien; Cantonese; Hakka; English; Malay; Tamil
- No. of seasons: 2
- No. of episodes: 15 episodes 13 episodes in Season 1 + 2 hours CNY Special episodes

Production
- Producer: Primeworks Studios
- Running time: 30 minutes (approx.)

Original release
- Network: ntv7
- Release: 15 April 2009 – 7 April 2010

你好 Mr. Siao! (NI HAO, Mr Siao!) (Mandarin for “Good Day, Mr Siao”) showing adult students from different ethnics in Malaysia learning Mandarin in a classroom setting. This locally produced series shows how non-Chinese and non-Mandarin-speaking Chinese learn Mandarin with hilarious outcomes. The series premiered on 15 April 2009, airing every Wednesday at 9:00pm on ntv7. A 2 CNY special episodes was aired during Chinese New Year 2010. The second season was premiered on 7 April 2010, acquiring its previous slot. This drama series mimics a British drama series named Mind Your English in 1978.

== Synopsis ==
The owner of Dream Big International, Mr. Robert Toh is looking to expand his business and is aiming to the China market. He needs his “diamond-ranking” and “pearl-ranking” leaders to train and guide the China distributors and agents but most of them are not well-versed in Mandarin. So he gets a Mandarin lecturer to teach this selected group proper Mandarin.

== Casts ==
=== Main Casts ===
in order of appearance
Auguste Kwan Teik Hooi
Kee Thuan Chye
Soo Wincci
Loo Aye Keng
Elvanna Raine
Steve Yap
Ling Tang
Tony Ong
Alvin Wong
Baki Zainal
Chai Jen
Ramasundran Rengan
Cindy Chen

=== Special appearances ===
Actor	Character	Description	Appearance
Kyo Chen			Season 1 - Episode 10
Berg Lee		Spy from a rival company	Season 1 - Episode 12
