= Melinder Bhullar =

Malaysian model

- ਮਲਿੰਦਰ ਕੌਰ ਭੁੱਲਰ
- Born: Melinder Kaur Bhullar; 4 May 1992 (age 34); Kuala Lumpur, Malaysia
- Height: 1.67 m (5 ft 5 1/2 in)
- Beauty pageant titleholder
- Title: Miss World Malaysia 2013
- Hair colour: Brown
- Eye colour: Brown
- Major competitions: Miss World Malaysia 2013 (Winner); Miss World 2013 (Unplaced)

Melinder Kaur Bhullar (Punjabi: ਮਲਿੰਦਰ ਕੌਰ ਭੁੱਲਰ, romanized: Malidara kaura bhulara; born 1992) is a Malaysian model and beauty pageant titleholder. In 2013 she became the first Malaysian to be placed in the Multimedia Awards title in Miss World 2013, where she was placed as 4th Runner-up in that award.

== Career ==
=== Miss World Malaysia 2013 ===
In 2013, Bhullar was crowned as Miss World Malaysia 2013 and succeeded Yvonne Lee. She beat other fifteen contestants from different states. In the competition, she won the subsidiary title, Miss Beautiful Eyes and Miss Wacoal.

=== Miss World 2013 ===
Bhullar represented Malaysia in Miss World 2013 in Bali, Indonesia. Although she was considered one of the dark horses in that year, she did not placed, she but won the Multimedia Award as the fourth runner-up.
