= Soo Wincci =

Malaysian singer, actress and model (born 1985)

Doctor Soo Wincci
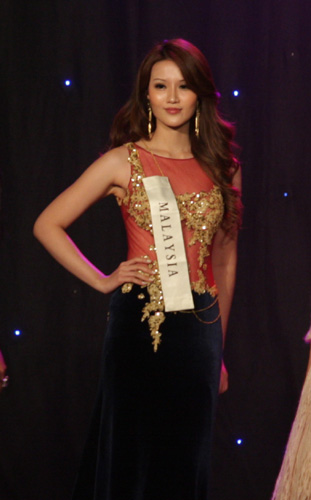
- Soo in 2008
- Born: 26 October 1985 (age 40); Petaling Jaya, Selangor, Malaysia
- Education: University of Reading (LLB); University of the Sunshine Coast (MBA); Open University Malaysia (PhD)
- Occupations: Singer; actress; model; associate professor
- Years active: 2004–present
- Beauty pageant titleholder
- Title: Miss World Malaysia 2008
- Major competitions: Miss Malaysia Intercontinental 2004 (2nd); Miss Intercontinental 2004 (unplaced); Miss Malaysia Oriental World 2004 (3rd); Miss Chinatown Malaysia 2005 (2nd); Miss Universe Malaysia 2008 (Top 5); Miss World 2008 (unplaced)

Chinese name
- Traditional Chinese: 蘇盈之
- Simplified Chinese: 苏盈之
- Hanyu Pinyin: Sū Yíngzhī
- Jyutping: Sou1 Jing4 Zi1

Soo Wincci (Chinese: 苏盈之; born 26 October 1985) is a Malaysian singer, actress, beauty pageant titleholder and model. She crowned Miss World Malaysia in 2008 and represented Malaysia in the Miss World 2008 beauty pageant. In 2013, she was selected by Hollywood's Independent Critics as one of the 100 most beautiful women in the world. In 2016 she was awarded the "Top 10 Most Outstanding Young Malaysian Award". In 2018 the Chinese media nicknamed her "The Most Beautiful Dr". She has four entries in the Malaysia Book of Records.

== Early life and education ==
Soo is a law graduate from the University of Reading (UK), an MBA holder from the University of the Sunshine Coast, and a PhD recipient in Business administration from Open University Malaysia. She received a PhD scholarship from Open University Malaysia.

In 2016, she managed to complete her Ph.D. research and passed her viva voce on 31 May 2016.

In 2017 she was accepted by Berklee College of Music Valencia to pursue her second master's degree. She graduated with her second master's & was awarded her post-master's fellowship .

In 2018, she graduated with a master's degree in music production, innovation and technology and later 2019 on with a Post master's degree Fellowship from Berklee College of Music in 2019.

In 2019 upon graduation, she was awarded 2 records by the Malaysia Book of Records, "Beauty Queen with the Most Achieved Degrees" and "Recording Artist with the Most Achieved Degrees". She was also accepted to the University of Polytechnic Valencia in order to pursue her second Ph.D.

== Career ==
=== 2004–2008: Beauty pageant ===
Soo Wincci spent almost six years modelling and participated in over twenty pageants until she won her most desired title: Miss World Malaysia in 2008.

In 2004, Wincci won second place in the Miss Malaysia Intercontinental pageant. However, the winner could not join the world pageant so she represented Malaysia in the Miss Intercontinental Pageant in China. She came third in the Miss Malaysia Oriental World pageant in the same year.

In 2005, she was the first runner-up in the Miss Chinatown pageant.

In 2008, after she completed her law degree in UK, she won Miss World Malaysia and represented Malaysia in the Miss World beauty pageant in Johannesburg, South Africa. She was a semifinalist for the Miss World Top Model and top finalist for Miss World Talent contests.

=== 2009–2012: Acting and singing career ===
In 2009, Soo began her acting career in a local NTV7 Chinese sitcom, titled Mr. Siao's Mandarin Class. On 18 August 2009, Soo released her self-composed singing album Soo Wincci. Samsung appointed her song "Beauty With a Purpose" (which was sung in English, Malay, and Chinese) as the theme for Samsung LED.

Soo starred in the Mediacorp Chinese drama titled Injustice as well as the second season of Mr. Siao's Mandarin Class in 2010.

Soo released her first full Chinese album titled Ying Guang in 2011. She acted as Hui Ying in the Mediacorp drama Destiny in Her Hands" and NTV7's legal drama Justice in the City. She also starred in Asia's first 3D thriller Hunter playing the role of a host named Hu Jing, aired in Asia in 2012. She composed and sang the movie's theme song.

In 2011, she went to the London Media and Film Academy to attend the Acting Masterclass, and the Hosting Masterclass. She also worked on her vocal skills with famous UK singing coach, Kim Chadler.

In 2012, she released her third Chinese album (with her own magazine) titled, In My Heart.

Soo joined the celebrity edition of MasterChef Malaysia, reaching the top-five finalists and became known as the Queen of Desserts. After MasterChef, she launched her Malay EP titled Terus Teranglah.

She launched her first Chinese international album titled Happiness in Taiwan.

In 2013, Soo was selected by Hollywood's Independent Critics for its list the 100 Most Beautiful Face of 2013. She was number 91. In 2014, Soo founded her own talent management company, Beyond Artistes. She acted as the main lead for the drama The Injustice Stranger.

=== 2017–present: Composing, public appearance and acting career ===
She also became a music producer by writing, composing and producing her self-created first motivational pop song titled "I Am X A Loser". She held her first motivational speaking tour giving talks at over twenty universities across Malaysia. Her villain role inside "Kau Yang Satu" received good reviews and was successfully released in cinemas.

She also attended variety shows in China and was being nicknamed by the China media as "The Most Beautiful Dr".

In mid-2020, she broke the news of her new comeback song with a Latin Grammy-winning Producer.

She returned back to acting in a Astro new originals series titled "The Queens's Ploy". Besides acting, she will be producing and composing for the drama theme songs. Apart from that, Soo also a participant The Masked Singer Malaysia in season 4 as Kak Cat.

== Other activities ==
=== Spokesperson ===
In 2010, Soo was also appointed to be the spokesperson for Avon Products Anew Skin in Malaysia.

=== Writing ===
In 2017 she wrote and produced her first book and audiobook titled Inwinccible X.

=== Ambassadorship ===
In January 2020, she was selected as the cultural ambassador for Thean Hou Temple of Malaysia.

== Awards and recognitions ==
- 2016: The Malaysia Book of Records as "The First Miss World Malaysia To Receive a PhD"
- 2016: JCI Ten Outstanding Young Malaysian (TOYM)
- 2019: The Malaysia Book of Records for "Most Number of Academic Degrees Obtained by a Beauty Queen"
- 2019: The Malaysia Book of Records for "Most Number of Academic Degrees Obtained by a Recording Artiste"
- 2022: The Malaysia Book of Records as "First Miss World Malaysia Appointed As Associate Professor"
