= Miss Universe Malaysia 2022 =

55th edition of Miss Universe Malaysia pageant

- Date: 7 October 2022
- Presenters: Hansen Lee
- Venue: M Resort and Hotel, Damansara, Kuala Lumpur
- Entrants: 13
- Placements: 8
- Winner: #6 Cheam Wei Yeng

Miss Universe Malaysia 2022 was the 55th edition of the Miss Universe Malaysia pageant which was held on 7 October 2022 at M Resort and Hotel, Damansara, Kuala Lumpur. Miss Universe Malaysia 2020, Francisca Luhong James crowned Cheam Wei Yeng at the end of the event. She represented Malaysia in Miss Universe 2022.

== Background ==
=== Location and date ===
Beauty camp of Miss Universe Malaysia 2022 was held from June until October.

On 8 September 2022, it was confirmed via Miss Universe Malaysia Instagram that the finale will take place at a new Resort and Hotel in the green belt of Damansara in Kuala Lumpur on 7 October 2022.

=== The Next Miss Universe Malaysia Reality Show ===
Sixth-webisodes of reality show entitled "The Next Miss Universe Malaysia 2022" was released via YouTube on Miss Universe Malaysia Channel.

Episode	Title	Original air date	Ref
1	The Journey Begins	20 June 2022	
2	Miracles with Make-Up	21 June 2022	
3	Your Hair is Your Crown	25 June 2022	
4	A Great Skin Starts Here	26 June 2022	
5	A Queen's Professional Haircare	2 July 2022	
6	A Good Hair Day Gets Better	3 July 2022	
7	Fish Bowl Challenge	2 September 2022	
8	Wax Candy	17 September 2022	
9	FIRE Fit	18 September 2022	
10	Elpis Models	24 September 2022	
11	Habib Raya Event	1 October 2022	
12	Vogue Lounge	2 October 2022	

== Pageant ==
=== Gala Night ===
On 8 September 2022, the organization announced that the gala night will be held at M Resort and Hotel in Kuala Lumpur. Due to organisers not getting approval from the Kuala Lumpur City Hall, the swimsuit competition for this edition has been cancelled.

=== Selection committee ===
- Kenny Yee – Founder of Make Up Miracle & Beauty Workshop
- Datin Selwinder Kaur – Chief Executive Officer of Glojas Aesthetic Clinic
- Rizman Ruzaini – Malaysian fashion designer
- Don Teo – Director of Operations, M Resort and Hotel
- Andrea Wong – Creative director and fashion stylist
- Dr. Karen Po – Medical Director of La Jung
- Shweta Sekhon – Miss Universe Malaysia 2019

== Placements ==
Color keys

- Declared as the winner in an International pageant.
- Ended as Runner-up in an International pageant.
- Ended as finalist or semifinalist in an International pageant.
- Unplaced.

Final results	Delegate	International pageant	International placement
Miss Universe Malaysia 2022	06 – Cheam Wei Yeng	Miss Universe 2022	Unplaced
1st Runner-Up	01 – Ajunee Kaur		
2nd Runner-Up	12 – Tee Wan Ying		
Top 8	02 – Annatasha Jeremiah; 04 – Catherine Lai; 08 – Joann Tiong; 10 – Kaverrna Nair; 15 – Wong Siu Jane		

== Awards ==
Special Awards	Delegate
Miss Congeniality	02 – Annatasha Jeremiah
Miss Habib	01 – Ajunee Kaur
Miss Body Beautiful	12 – Tee Wan Ying
Subsidiary Awards	Delegate
Miss La Jung Glorious	15 – Wong Siu Jane
Miss Glojas Glowing Beauty	01 – Ajunee Kaur
Miss Good Hair Day	02 – Annatasha Jeremiah
Miss M Resort	15 – Wong Siu Jane
Miss Radiant Confident	06 – Cheam Wei Yeng
Miss Dermalogica Healthy Skin	04 – Catherine Lai
Miss Schwarzkopf Most Beautiful Hair	06 – Cheam Wei Yeng

== Contestants ==
15 contestants competed for the title. Seven from Selangor, two from Melaka, and one each from Kuala Lumpur, Sabah, Penang, Sarawak, Perak and Pahang.

No.	Delegate	Age (Note: Ages at the time of the pageant)	Height	Residency	Placement	Notes
01	Ajunee Simreet Kaur Khangura	20	1.70 m (5 ft 7 in)	Kuala Lumpur	1st Runner-up	
02	Annatasha Shanty Jeremiah	25	1.70 m (5 ft 7 in)	Penampang	Top 8	
03	Buganna S. Saravana Kumar	24	1.68 m (5 ft 6 in)	Melaka		
04	Catherine Lai Hui Yi	26	1.68 m (5 ft 6 in)	Melaka	Top 8	
05	Chantal Yuen Ting	27	1.72 m (5 ft 7 1/2 in)	Penang		Dropped out from the pageant
06	Lesley Cheam Wei Yeng	26	1.66 m (5 ft 5 1/2 in)	Semenyih	Miss Universe Malaysia 2022	
07	Clarissa Tay Wei Qi	24	1.71 m (5 ft 7 1/2 in)	Selangor		
08	Joann Tiong Hau Ping	21	1.66 m (5 ft 5 1/2 in)	Kuching	Top 8	
09	Kasshvini Mathuraiveran	26	1.68 m (5 ft 6 in)	Selangor		Dropped out from the pageant
10	Kaverrna Nair Sukumaran	26	1.68 m (5 ft 6 in)	Subang Jaya	Top 8	
11	Jingle Phan Jing Mun	26	1.70 m (5 ft 7 in)	Ipoh		
12	Tee Wan Ying	25	1.76 m (5 ft 9 1/2 in)	Mentakab	2nd Runner-up	
13	Thevambbikai G.K. Kasinathan	27	1.75 m (5 ft 9 in)	Selangor		
14	Varyne Foo Augustine	20	1.70 m (5 ft 7 in)	Puchong		
15	Wong Siu Jane	25	1.71 m (5 ft 7 1/2 in)	Selangor	Top 8	
