= Miss Universe Malaysia 2020 =

2020 beauty pageant in Malaysia

- Date: 5 September 2020
- Presenters: Hansen Lee
- Entertainment: Aqeesh Aleeya
- Venue: Kota Damansara, Petaling Jaya, Selangor
- Broadcaster: hurr.tv
- Entrants: 18
- Placements: 11
- Winner: Francisca James Sarawak
- Congeniality: Celine Foo; Kuala Lumpur
- Fan Favorite: Meme Yaw; Sabah

Miss Universe Malaysia 2020, the 54th edition of the Miss Universe Malaysia, was held on 5 September 2020 at Kota Damansara, Petaling Jaya, Selangor. Francisca Luhong James of Sarawak was crowned by the outgoing titleholder, Shweta Sekhon of Kuala Lumpur at the end of the event. She represents Malaysia at Miss Universe 2020 pageant held in Hollywood, Florida, United States.

== Background ==
=== Gala Night ===
The Miss Universe Malaysia was originally to be held on April 16, 2020 but on March 16, 2020, every events in Malaysia have to be cancel (or postponed) due to the disease transmission of COVID-19.

In early July, it was announced that the gala night will be held on September 5 in the form of "e-Gala" with no audience present physically during the event due to the COVID-19 pandemic and social distancing. The e-Gala will be the first-ever virtual Miss Universe Malaysia gala and will be broadcast live on the official website of Miss Universe Malaysia. During the livestream, audiences get to vote for the Miss Body Beautiful, Best in Evening Gown and the winner of Miss Universe Malaysia.

==== e-Gala Night Judges ====
- Dato' Hans Isaac - actor, director and producer.
- Datin Selwinder Kaur - Glojas by Smart International Aesthetic chief operating officer.
- Dr Nicholas Lim - La Jung Aesthetic Clinic medical director and aesthetic medical practitioner.
- Deborah Priya Henry - Miss Universe Malaysia 2011.
- Carven Ong - Carven Ong Couture creative designer.
- Michelle Lam - Esthetics International Group director.
- Shawn Loong - Shawn Cutler Group of Salons founder, creative director and celebrity stylist.
- Elizabeth Lee - Bowerhouse co-founder.

==== Pre-judging Judges ====
- Marini Ramlan - artist and entrepreneur.
- Rubin Khoo - associate publisher at Burda Luxury KL.
- Sunita Chhabra - editor of "Life Inspired" at The Star.
- Datuk Yasmin Yusoff - Miss Universe Malaysia 1978, actress and singer.
- Zahir Kelvin Ong Abdullah - TV host and executive director of Venus Assets Sdn Bhd.

=== Background ===
The public could watch the live-streamed competition by purchasing tickets to the show on the Miss Universe Malaysia website, with 20 per cent of the proceeds to be channeled to Lighthouse Children Welfare Home Association in Kuala Lumpur and Selangor. The winner will also receive a cash prize and sponsored prizes with a combined value of RM 180,000 and a full education scholarship from HELP University.

=== Final program ===
The grand finale was originally scheduled for 5 March 2020, then being delayed from April 2020 and once again to 11 July 2020 before being rescheduled to 5 September 2020. It was originally to be held at The Majestic Hotel Kuala Lumpur, but it was changed to live-streamed virtually at Miss Universe Malaysia website.

=== Marketing ===
The finalists will be featured in an online show, The Next 2020 Miss Universe Malaysia, comprising 18 episodes scheduled to be aired starting January 23, 2020, followed by 10 episodes of their journey leading to the crowning of Miss Universe Malaysia on online lifestyle channel, hurr.tv. The webisodes will also be available on the Miss Universe Malaysia Organization YouTube channel and the hurr.tv mobile app.

== Results ==
Final Results	Contestants
Miss Universe Malaysia 2020	Sarawak – Francisca James
1st Runner–Up	Selangor – Charissa Chong
2nd Runner–Up	Johor – Serene Chai
3rd Runner–Up	Kuala Lumpur – Neha Verma
Top 11	Kuala Lumpur – Celine Foo; Kuala Lumpur – Chua Xing Er; Kuala Lumpur – Louisa Ananthan; Kuala Lumpur – Pritha Manivannan; Pahang – Quinn Fung; Sabah – Rindsay Rachelle Laige; Sabah – Meme Yaw §

§ – Fan favorite winner

=== Order of announcements ===
Top 11

1. Kuala Lumpur - Celine Foo

2. Sabah - Rindsay Laige

3. Selangor - Charissa Chong

4. Johor - Serene Chai

5. Sarawak - Francisca James

6. Kuala Lumpur - Louisa Ananthan

7. Pahang - Quinn Fung

8. Kuala Lumpur - Pritha Manivannan

9. Kuala Lumpur - Chua Xinger

10. Kuala Lumpur - Neha Verma

11. Sabah - Meme Yaw §

Top 4

1. Selangor - Charissa Chong

2. Kuala Lumpur - Neha Verma

3. Sarawak - Francisca James

4. Johor - Serene Chai

== Special awards ==
Awards	Contestants
Miss Congeniality	#2 Kuala Lumpur – Celine Foo
Miss Habib	#11 Kuala Lumpur – Neha Verma
Miss Body Beautiful	#9 Kuala Lumpur – Louisa Ananthan
Best in Evening Gown	#7 Sarawak – Francisca Luhong James
Fan Favorite Winner	#10 Sabah – Meme Yaw
Miss Online Personality	#11 Kuala Lumpur – Neha Verma
Miss La Jung Youthful Forever	#17 Kuala Lumpur – Serene Chai Yong Bin
Miss Auto Bavaria Elegance	#7 Sarawak – Francisca Luhong James
Miss Dermalogica Healthy Skin	#14 Kuala Lumpur – Pritha Manivannan
Miss Skinz Sanctuary Flawless Skin	#17 Kuala Lumpur – Serene Chai Yong Bin
Miss Strip Body Confidence	#3 Selangor – Charissa Chong Su Huey
Miss Glojas Beautiful	#14 Kuala Lumpur – Pritha Manivannan
Shawn Cutler Hair Award	#16 Sabah – Rindsay Rachelle Laige

== Contestants ==
18 contestants competed for the title of Miss Universe Malaysia 2020:

No.	Contestants	Age (Note: Ages at the time of the pageant)	Height	Represented	Notes
1.	Adelina Chan Yin Ling	26	168 cm (5 ft 6 in)	Penang	
2.	Celine Foo	25	173 cm (5 ft 8 in)	Kuala Lumpur	Top 11
3.	Charissa Chong Su Huey	26	171 cm (5 ft 7 1/2 in)	Selangor	1st runner-up
4.	Ching Poh Yee (Chloe)	24	165 cm (5 ft 5 in)	Kuala Lumpur	
5.	Chua Xing Er (Xinger)	23	173 cm (5 ft 8 in)	Kuala Lumpur	Top 11
6.	Francisca Luhong James	24	175 cm (5 ft 9 in)	Sarawak	Winner
7.	Gladys Liew Chi Mun	23	167 cm (5 ft 5 1/2 in)	Perak	
8.	Haylynn Tan Siau Thong	20	167 cm (5 ft 5 1/2 in)	Selangor	
9.	Louisa Ananthan	22	170 cm (5 ft 7 in)	Kuala Lumpur	Top 11
10.	Yaw Mee Mee (Meme)	25	170 cm (5 ft 7 in)	Sabah	Top 11
11.	Neha Verma	21	176 cm (5 ft 9 1/2 in)	Kuala Lumpur	3rd runner-up
12.	Ooi Erjun	22	174 cm (5 ft 8 1/2 in)	Selangor	
13.	Prissha Gerald	21	174 cm (5 ft 8 1/2 in)	Johor	
14.	Pritha Manivannan	26	168 cm (5 ft 6 in)	Kuala Lumpur	Top 11
15.	Fung Wei Qing (Quinn)	23	168 cm (5 ft 6 in)	Pahang	Top 11
16.	Rindsay Rachelle Laige	21	168 cm (5 ft 6 in)	Sabah	Top 11
17.	Serene Chai Yong Bin	25	168 cm (5 ft 6 in)	Johor	2nd runner-up
18.	Yong Meei Yeng	26	168 cm (5 ft 6 in)	Selangor	

== Crossovers ==
Contestants who previously competed/appeared at other international/national beauty pageants:

International Pageants

Miss International

- 2013 - Charissa Chong (Unplaced)

World Miss University

- 2014 - Charissa Chong (Top 30)

Miss Asean

- 2014 - Charissa Chong (Top 5)

Miss Global Beauty Queen

- 2017 - Meme Yaw (Unplaced)

National Pageants

Miss Universe Malaysia

- 2017 - Meme Yaw (Top 50)

Miss World Malaysia

- 2015 - Serene Chai Yong Bin (1st Runner-up)
- 2016 - Francisca Luhong James (4th Runner-up) → (2nd Runner-up)
- 2018 - Francisca Luhong James (Top 5)

Miss International Malaysia

- 2013 - Charissa Chong (Winner–Miss International Malaysia)
- 2017 - Meme Yaw (Winner–Miss Global Beauty Queen Malaysia)

Miss Astro Chinese International

- 2016 - Serene Chai Yong Bin (Top 8)

Miss Cultural Harvest Festival

- 2015 - Francisca Luhong James (2nd Runner-up)

Supermodel International Malaysia

- 2017 - Charissa Chong (Top 20)

Miss Malaysia Borneo Tourism

- 2015 - Meme Yaw (Top 5)

Sabah Model Of The Year

- 2016 - Meme Yaw (Finalist)
