= Jane Teoh =

Malaysian model and beauty pageant titleholder

- Born: Teoh Jun Jane; 26 July 1997 (age 29); Bayan Lepas, Penang, Malaysia
- Education: Penang Chinese Girls' High School
- Occupation: Model • Student
- Height: 1.78 m (5 ft 10 in)
- Beauty pageant titleholder
- Title: Face of Beauty Malaysia 2016; Miss Universe Malaysia 2018
- Agency: Andrew Models (Kuala Lumpur)
- Years active: 2016–present
- Hair colour: Dark brown
- Eye colour: Black
- Major competitions: Miss Universe Malaysia 2018 (Winner); Miss Universe 2018 (Unplaced)

Jane Teoh (born 1997) is a Malaysian Chinese model and beauty pageant titleholder, who was crowned Miss Universe Malaysia 2018. She represented her country at the Miss Universe 2018 pageant and did not make it to the semifinalists round. This was the 48th consecutive year Malaysia did not place in the Miss Universe pageant.

== Personal life ==
Teoh Jun Jane was born and raised in Bayan Lepas, Penang, Malaysia. She has an older sister (163 cm (5 ft 4 in)) and a younger brother (164 cm (5 ft 5 in)). She is the tallest in her family. She was a prefect in Penang Chinese Girls' High School. After competing in the Miss Universe 2018, she plans to complete her degree in Accounting at HELP University.

== Pageantry ==
=== Face of Beauty Malaysia 2016 ===
Teoh's first appearance in the pageantry world came when she joined Face of Beauty Malaysia 2016, which was held in Penang. She was crowned the winner, earning the right to represent the country at the Face of Beauty International 2016.

=== Face of Beauty International 2016 ===
Teoh represented Malaysia at the 5th edition of Face of Beauty International held in Ulaanbaatar, Mongolia. She was placed in the Top 10.

=== Miss Universe Malaysia 2018 ===
In 2018, Teoh competed at the Miss Universe Malaysia 2018, where she was eventually crowned as winner by the outgoing titleholder, Samantha Katie James. By winning the crown, Teoh gained the right to represent Malaysia at Miss Universe 2018.

=== Miss Universe 2018 ===
Teoh represented Malaysia at global Miss Universe 2018 held in Bangkok, Thailand, but not managed to place in the top 20 semifinalists.

== Modelling career ==
=== 2018-present ===
Teoh is a fashion model and has walked for fashion shows such as the Mercedes-Benz Fashion Week Kuala Lumpur, Penang Fashion Week 2018, and Sakura Collection 2018 in Japan. In 2019, Teoh was featured in a promotional campaign called "Heritage at the Heart" by Singaporean luxury jade jeweller, Choo Yilin. Teoh became one of two Malaysian models to be featured in Victoria's Secret first ever local campaign in 2023.

== Advocacy ==
After winning Miss Universe Malaysia in January 2018, Teoh was cyberbullied by people who poked fun at her features. Inspired by her experience, Teoh launched an awareness campaign against cyberbullying called "#DareToShout" in conjunction with World Mental Health Day 2018. Teoh conducted a series of talks in Penang schools to champion the cause.

Awards and achievements
Preceded by Vienna Goh Yun Tyn	Face of Beauty Malaysia; 2016	Succeeded by Ollemadthee Kunasagaran
Preceded by Samantha Katie James	Miss Universe Malaysia; 2018	Succeeded by Shweta Sekhon
