= Miss Cultural Harvest Festival =

- Formation: 1999
- Type: Beauty pageant
- Headquarters: Kuching, Sarawak, Malaysia
- Location: Malaysia
- Official language: English, Malay
- Affiliations: Sarawak Tourism Board; Sarawak Cultural Village

Miss Cultural Harvest Festival is a Malaysian ethnic beauty pageant held annually during the Sarawak Harvest and Folklore Festival since 1999.

== Background ==
Miss Cultural Harvest Festival is held in conjunction with the Sarawak Harvest and Folklore Festival, one of the highlights of the Gawai Dayak celebration. The Sarawak Harvest and Folklore Festival is the largest in Sarawak in terms of the community involved.

The beauty pageant aims to seek a winner who has the grace and poise, articulate with a sound knowledge of Sarawak and its tourism-related subjects. The beauty pageant is open to all single ladies of any background, unlike the traditional Kumang Gawai pageant where the contestants are of the Dayak community.

== Titleholders ==
Year	Winner	Ethnic background	Note
2023 - 2026	No pageant held		
2022	No pageant held due to the COVID-19 pandemic		
2021	No pageant held due to the COVID-19 pandemic		
2020	No pageant held due to the COVID-19 pandemic		
2019	Tamira Lallemand	Bidayuh-English	
2018	Melinda Peter Jinap	Bidayuh-Kelabit	
2017	Shastaclaire Drickerson	Bidayuh-Punjabi	
2016	Trisdewi Trisno	Javanese-Chinese	
2015	Jean Seymour Harry	Iban	
2014	Stepheni Johari	Iban	
2013	Rosalind Sajah Robert Lugah	Iban	

== Former editions ==
Due to change of the festival name and collaboration with Fair and Lovely brand, the contest was previously known as "Miss Fair and Lovely Gawai Tourism Night (GTN)" between 1999 and 2004, "Miss Fair and Lovely" for the 2005 and 2006 editions, "Miss Fair and Lovely World Harvest Festival" between 2007 and 2010, and "Miss World Harvest Festival" for the 2011 and 2012 editions.

=== Miss World Harvest Festival (2011 - 2012) ===
Year	Winner
2012	Magrina Awing George
2011	Suljirina Lucas

=== Miss Fair and Lovely World Harvest Festival (2007 - 2010) ===
Year	Winner
2010	Ummu Khansa Romainoor
2009	Janet Bennet
2008	Pearlycia Brooke
2007	Hazel Desmond

=== Miss Fair and Lovely (2006) ===
Year	Winner
2006	Raden Ira Faraniza Mohd Iskandar
2005	Esther Agetha Jitom

=== Miss Fair and Lovely Gawai Tourism Night (GTN) (1999 - 2004) ===
Year	Winner
2004	Marcella Shareen Mos
2003	Farhana Zainal
2002	Sharifah Norzuridah
2001	Fairozita Ramli
2000	Shahida
1999	Rowena Awa Ngumbang

== Notable crossovers ==
Winners and contestants who competed/appeared at other international/ national beauty pageants:

International Pageants

Miss World

- 2014 - Dewi Liana Seriestha (Note: Dewi was the first runner-up of the 2010 edition.) (Top 25)

Miss Universe

- 2020 - Francisca Luhong James Bungan (Unplaced)

National Pageants

Miss World Malaysia

- 2011 - Janet Bennet (Top 10 and "Miss Photogenic")
- 2014 - Dewi Liana Seriestha (Winner)
- 2016 - Francisca Luhong James Bungan (Note: Francisca was the 2nd runner-up of the 2015 edition.) (4th runner-up)
- 2018 - Francisca Luhong James Bungan (Top 5)

Miss Universe Malaysia

- 2013 - Karissa Kara Simon (Note: Karissa was the 2nd runner-up of the 2012 edition.) (Top 17 Finalist)
- 2018 - Jessy Gantle (Note: Jessy was Miss Photogenic of the 2015 edition.) (Top 18 Finalist)
- 2020 - Francisca Luhong James Bungan (Note: Francisca was the second runner-up of the 2015 edition.) (Winner)

Miss Earth Malaysia

- 2017 - Jean Seymour Harry (Top 6 and "Miss Eco Beauty")

== See also ==
- Sarawak
- Gawai Dayak
- Unduk Ngadau
- Teluwaih Jinih
