= Miss Universe Malaysia 1973 =

11th edition of Miss Universe Malaysia

- Venue: Merlin Hotel, Kuala Lumpur
- Entrants: 13
- Placements: 8
- Winner: Margaret Loo; Selangor

Miss Malaysia Universe 1973, the 7th edition of the Miss Universe Malaysia, was held at the Merlin Hotel, Kuala Lumpur. Maggie Loo of Selangor was crowned by the outgoing titleholder, Helen Looi of Penang at the end of the event. She then represented Malaysia at the Miss Universe 1973 pageant in Athens, Greece.

== Results ==
Final Results	Contestants
Miss Malaysia Universe 1973	Selangor – Maggie Loo
1st Runner–Up; Miss Malaysia Asia Quest 1974	Penang – Evelyn Thum Lin Chee
2nd Runner–Up	Sarawak – Marleng Shawn
3rd Runner–Up	Kelantan – Sharifah Hamiza Syed Abu Bakar
4th Runner–Up	Pahang – Rosalina Ahmad
Top 8	Perlis – Noor Fauziah Ibrahim; Sabah – Raja Khatijah Raja Kamal; Trengganu – Rahani Haji Mahgan

== Delegates ==
- Johore - Angela Lee
- Kedah - Kim Ai Thing
- Kelantan - Sharifah Hamiza Syed Abu Bakar
- Malacca - Liza Saw
- Negri Sembilan - Sandra Yeo
- Pahang - Rosalina Yahil Ahmad (Also competed in previous year, won Miss Malaysia Asia Quest 1972)
- Penang - Evelyn Thum Lin Chee
- Perak - Shirley Cheong
- Perlis - Noor Fauziah Ibrahim
- Sabah - Raja Khatijah Raja Kamal
- Sarawak - Marleng Shawn
- Selangor - Maggie Loo Tai Tai
- Trengganu - Rahani Haji Mahgan
