= Miss Universe Malaysia 2003 =

- Date: 11 April 2003
- Presenters: K.T. Pillay
- Venue: Istana Hotel, Kuala Lumpur
- Broadcaster: Astro Hitz
- Director: Pageant Promotions Sdn. Bhd.
- Entrants: 16
- Placements: 10
- Winner: Elaine Daly; Kuala Lumpur

Miss Malaysia Universe 2003, the 37th edition of the Miss Universe Malaysia, was held on 11 April 2003 at the Istana Hotel, Kuala Lumpur. Elaine Daly of Kuala Lumpur was crowned by the outgoing titleholder, Karen Ang of Sarawak at the end of the event. She then represented Malaysia at the Miss Universe 2003 pageant in Panama City, Panama. Daly also once competed in Miss Malaysia World 1999 where she ended up as runner-up.
