= Borneo Convention Centre Kuching =

Event venue in Kuching, Malaysia

- Interactive map of Borneo Convention Centre Kuching
- Location: Kuching, Sarawak, Malaysia
- Coordinates: 1°33′45″N 110°24′20″E
- Owner: Sarawak state government
- Operator: Borneo Isthmus Development Sdn Bhd

Construction
- Built: October 2009
- Construction cost: RM 200 million

Website
- www.bcck.com.my

The Borneo Convention Centre Kuching (BCCK) is a convention centre located in Kuching, Sarawak, Malaysia. It is the first dedicated convention and exhibition centre in Borneo and the second-largest convention centre in Borneo after the Sabah International Convention Centre in Kota Kinabalu. Located approximately 8 km from the city centre, it aims to organize and attract local and international concerts, events, exhibitions and conventions to Sarawak.

The convention centre is managed by Borneo Isthmus Development Sdn. Bhd., which is a Sarawak state-owned company. It oversees all operational aspects of convention centre. BCCK is commonly mistaken as the new office for the Sarawak Convention Bureau (SCB). The SCB functions to attract and bid for conferences and meetings to the state of Sarawak which can be hosted in any venue as chosen by the organizers.

== Construction ==
=== First phase ===
Located on a six-hectare riverfront site in the city of Kuching, construction began in June 2006. The estimated cost of construction was about RM 200 million. Construction was completed in October 2009.

=== Expansion ===
The second stage of the convention centre, known as BCCK2, began on April 30, 2025 and is expected to be fully completed by March 31, 2028. The expansion was designed by KIRK Architects and the RM550 million-construction contract was awarded to Cahya Mata Sarawak subsidiary, CMS Land Sdn Bhd. The expansion is set to be one of the world's largest single-floor timber structures, at 15,500 m² under-roof with a clear span of 42 metres, when combined with the existing BCCK, will be able to host 15,000 visitors at once.

== Architecture ==
A major element in the design – when viewed from the outside – is its roof structure. The centre's roof is shaped in the form of a “ririk” leaf, which in the Iban language refers to the species Phacelophrynium maximum. "Ririk" grows in abundance in Sarawak, and due to its large leaves, it is used by many indigenous tribes for wrapping rice and food.

The roof canopy is supported by a series of exposed structural elements resembling the trunks and branches of rainforest trees. BCCK is designed on an east–west axis to mitigate the effects of solar gain. It is also oriented to face Mecca and incorporates a Muslim prayer room.

== Specifications ==
The building has a gross floor area of 36,500 square metres and the internal design offers complete flexibility with functional spaces able to be sub-divided into a variety of sizes and configurations for plenary sessions, exhibitions and banquets.

The capacities in BCCK include 1,500 delegates in plenary, a 2,000-capacity banquet hall and 14 breakout meetings rooms. The largest pillar free exhibition space is 2,500 square meters. Car parking for 800 vehicles is provided in a combination of underground and open parking.

In addition, BCCK provides supporting service areas including reception and pre-function assembly areas, a VIP lounge, administration offices, commercial kitchens capable of servicing 2,000 delegates and a public restaurant.

== Facilities ==
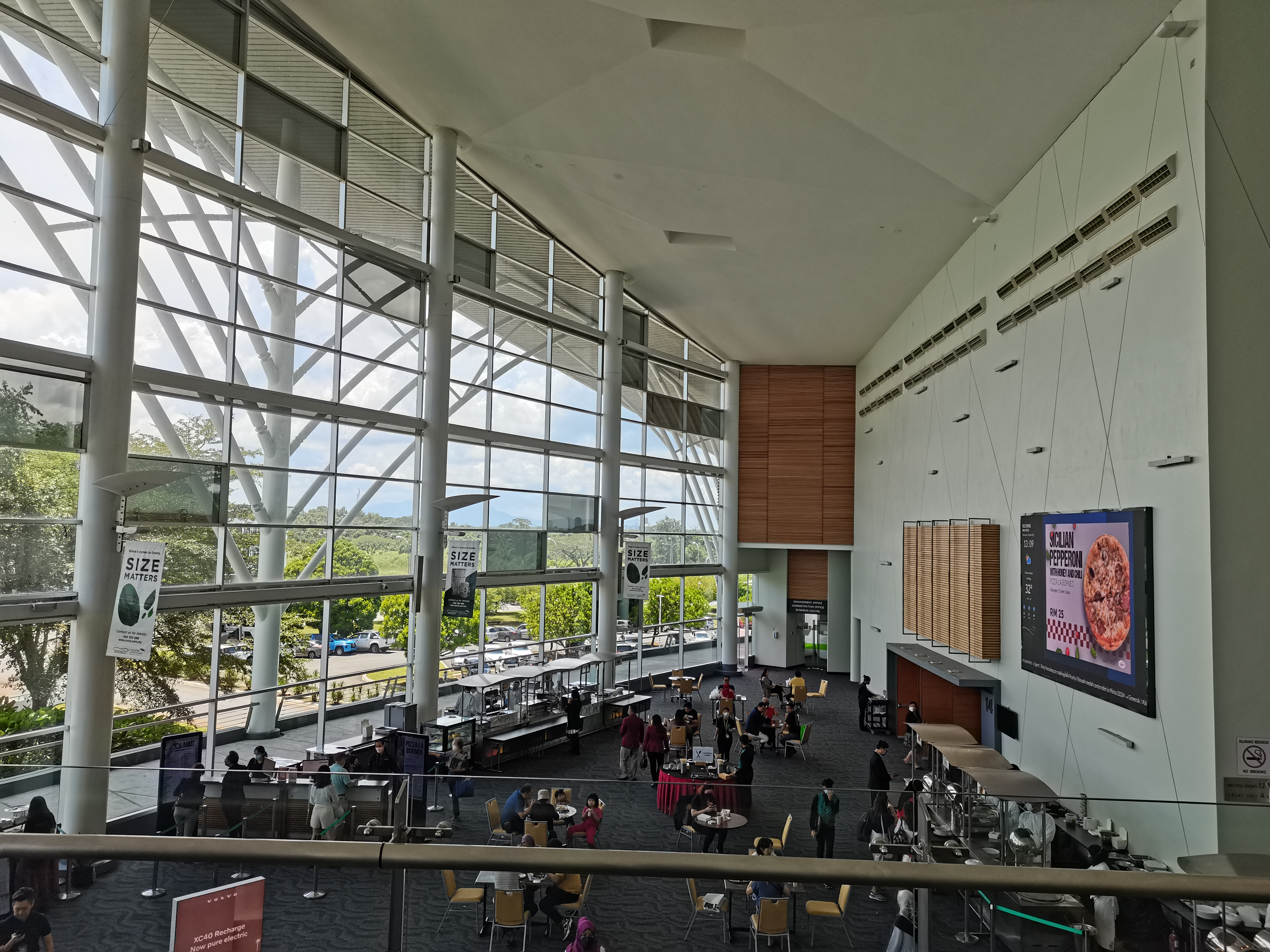
Interior view of Borneo Convention Centre during SHEDA Expo 2022.

- Meeting Room
- Conference Room
- Exhibition Hall

== Major events in BCCK ==
=== Conferences ===
- TEDxYouth @ Kenyalang 2016
- TEDxKenyalang 2017
- 13th World Islamic Economic Forum (WIEF) (2017)
- 20th Gempuru Besai Iban 2017
- 6th International Energy Week (IEW) 2025, 15 - 17 July 2025
- Sarawak Renewable Energy Forum (Saref) 4.0, 3 - 4 September 2025
- 4th Rabies in Borneo (RIB 2025) Conference, 30 September - 1 October 2025
- 6th World Veterinary Poultry Association Congress (WVPAC 2025), 6 - 10 October 2025

=== Entertainment events ===
- Miss World Malaysia 2018
- 23rd Asian Television Awards 2019
- Boney M 50th Anniversary Tour, 4 January 2025

== Awards ==
Year	Award	Category	Result
2015	rAWr (Recognising Award Winning Results) Awards	Purpose Built Convention & Exhibition Centre Award for Excellence (below 15,000 sqm gross saleable space)	Won
2017	rAWr (Recognising Award Winning Results) Awards	International Conference Award for Excellence (Below 1,000 delegates)	Won
2017	rAWr (Recognising Award Winning Results) Awards	Purpose Built Convention and Exhibition Centre Award for Excellence (Below Gross 15,000 sqm of total saleable space)	Won
2018	AIPC Apex Award	Best Client Rated Convention Centre	Nominated
2025	3rd Malaysia Business Events Awards (MBEA)	Purpose-Built Convention & Exhibition Centre Excellence Award – Total Saleable Space 15,000 sqm & Below	Won
