= Miss Universe Malaysia 2018 =

- Date: 11 January 2018
- Presenters: Stephen Rahman-Hughes; Kimberley Leggett
- Entertainment: Yuna; Nasty Rock Crew; Dasha Logan
- Venue: Majestic Araneta Auditorium, Kuala Lumpur
- Broadcaster: hurr.tv
- Entrants: 18
- Placements: 10
- Winner: Jane Teoh; Penang
- Congeniality: Natasha Aprillia Benggon; Sabah
- Photogenic: Charmaine Chew; Kedah

Miss Universe Malaysia 2018, the 52nd edition of the Miss Universe Malaysia, was held on 11 January 2018 at the Majestic Araneta Auditorium, Kuala Lumpur. Jane Teoh of Penang was crowned by the outgoing titleholder, Samantha James of Kuala Lumpur at the end of the event. She then represented Malaysia at the Miss Universe 2018 pageant in Bangkok, Thailand.

== Results ==
Final Results	Contestants
Miss Universe Malaysia 2018	Penang – Jane Teoh
1st Runner–Up	Selangor – Alexis Sue-Ann
2nd Runner–Up	Kuala Lumpur – Liliana Fernandez
3rd Runner–Up	Kuala Lumpur – Jesebel Robert
Top 10	Kedah – Charmaine Chew; Kuala Lumpur – Jaipreet Kaur; Kuala Lumpur – Kaayathri Pramasivam; Kuala Lumpur – Shannen Jade; Sabah – Natasha Benggon; Selangor – Mellisa Wong

=== Gala Night Judges ===
- Dato’ Sri Navneet Goenka - Founder & Vice President of CERES Jewels
- Dato’ Hans Isaac - Malaysian actor, Writer, Director and producer
- Miko Au - Founder of Miko Gelere, Celebrity Hairstylist
- Levy Li - Miss Universe Malaysia 2008
- Lau Sook Phing - General Manager of L’Oréal Luxe Malaysia
- Datin Selwinder Kaur - Chief Operating Officer of Glojas Health Clinic
- Kiriat Argenio - Director of Marketing Zalora Malaysia
- Nuraliza Othman - National Director of Miss Singapore, Miss Universe Singapore 2002
- Deborah Henry - Miss Universe Malaysia 2011

== Special awards ==
Awards	Contestants
Face of La Juiceria	Kuala Lumpur – Alexis SueAnn
Miss Fitness Fitology	Selangor – Mellisa Wong
Miss Body Beautiful	Kuala Lumpur – Liliana Fernandez
Miss Congeniality	Sabah – Natasha Benggon
Miss Online Personality	Penang – Jane Teoh
Miss Zalora Style Star	Kuala Lumpur – Liliana Fernandez
Miss SMC Winning Smile	Perak – Charlotte Tan
Miss Auto Bavaria Elegance	Perak – Charlotte Tan
Miss Lancôme Beautiful	Kuala Lumpur – Maria Escobia
Miss Miko Galere Exceptional Coiffure	Kedah – Charmaine Chew
Miss Glojas Glowing Beauty	Kuala Lumpur – Alexis SueAnn
Most Inspiring by HELP University	Selangor – Shri Dahinoor John (Top 50 finalist)

== Contestants ==
Official 18 Finalists of Miss Universe Malaysia 2018.

=== Color Key ===
Declared as Winner
Ended as Top 4 Finalists
Ended as Top 10 Semifinalists
Eliminated or Quit

No.	Contestant	Age	Height	Ethnicity	Hometown	Occupation	Notes
1	Alexis SueAnn Seow Su-Yin	22	5 ft 8 in (1.73 m)	Chinese	Selangor	TV & Radio Host/YouTuber	1st Runner-up
2	Asha Kaur Ranjit Singh	24	5 ft 6 1/2 in (1.69 m)	Punjabi	Kuala Lumpur	Dental Student	
3	Charlotte Tan Bee Theng	24	5 ft 6 in (1.68 m)	Chinese	Perak	Chemist	
4	Charmaine Chew Qi En	20	5 ft 8 in (1.73 m)	Chinese	Kedah	Public Relations/Marketing Student	Top 10
5	Jaipreet Kaur Dhillon	23	5 ft 8 in (1.73 m)	Punjabi	Kuala Lumpur	Business Graduate	Top 10
6	Jane Teoh Jun	20	5 ft 10 in (1.78 m)	Chinese	Penang	Accounting & Finance Student	Winner
7	Jasebel Shalani Robert	22	5 ft 8 in (1.73 m)	Chindian	Kuala Lumpur	Mass Communications Student	3rd Runner-up
8	Jessy Gantle	23	5 ft 5 in (1.65 m)	Aborigine	Sarawak	Human Resource Administrator	
9	Kaayathri Pramasivam	25	5 ft 7 2/3 in (1.72 m)	Indian	Kuala Lumpur	Assistant Pharmacist	Top 10
10	Kirsten Wong Yee Mun	22	5 ft 7 in (1.70 m)	Chinese	Kuala Lumpur	Advertising & design Student	
11	Liliana Fernandez	20	5 ft 7 2/3 in (1.72 m)	Eurasian	Kuala Lumpur	Early Childhood Education Student	2nd Runner-up
12	Lysandra Gabriel Storie	20	5 ft 6 in (1.68 m)	Aborigine	Sarawak	Applied Science Student	Pre-eliminated/quit before Coronation
13	Maria Devonne Escobia	24	5 ft 5 2/3 in (1.67 m)	Filipino	Kuala Lumpur	Business Administration Student	
14	Mellisa Wong Yi Sheong	22	5 ft 6 1/2 in (1.69 m)	Chinese	Selangor	Medical Student	Top 10
15	Natasha Aprillia Jalius Benggon	23	5 ft 9 1/2 in (1.77 m)	Aborigine	Sabah	Entrepreneur	Top 10
16	Sabrina Thevy Arumugam	25	5 ft 9 2/3 in (1.77 m)	Indian	Selangor	Veterinary Doctor	
17	Shahraswaty Nesaretnam	21	5 ft 7 in (1.70 m)	Indian	Selangor	Psychology Student	
18	Shannen Jade Totten	23	5 ft 7 1/2 in (1.71 m)	Eurasian	Kuala Lumpur	Model/Artist	Top 10

== Top 50 ==
The Top 50 contestants was announced via Miss Universe Malaysia official page on 8 September 2017.

The contestant that was chosen as official candidate.

No.	Contestant	Age	Height	Ethnicity	Audition Place
1.	Alexis Sue-Ann	22	171 cm	Chinese	Kuala Lumpur
2.	Asha Kaur Ranjit Singh	24	169 cm	Indian	Kuala Lumpur
3.	Charmaine Chew Qi En	20	173 cm	Chinese	Kuala Lumpur
4.	Ellie Chuah Ee Leen	25	171 cm	Chinese	Kuala Lumpur
5.	Ginisha Ashuk	23	163 cm	Indian	Kuala Lumpur
6.	Jacyntha Foo Kai Syn	25	171 cm	Chinese	Kuala Lumpur
7.	Jaipreet Kaur Dhillon	23	173 cm	Indian	Kuala Lumpur
8.	Jasebel Shalani Robert	22	171 cm	Chindian	Kuala Lumpur
9.	Kaayathri Pramasivam	25	172 cm	Indian	Kuala Lumpur
10.	Kristen Wong Yee Mun	22	170 cm	Chinese	Kuala Lumpur
11.	Liliana Fernandez	20	172 cm	Indian	Kuala Lumpur
12.	Maria Devonne Escobia	25	172 cm	Eurasian	Kuala Lumpur
13.	Rachel Tee Hoi May	23	157 cm	Chinese	Kuala Lumpur
14.	Sabrina Thevy	25	177 cm	Indian	Kuala Lumpur
15.	Soo See Yin	22	175 cm	Chinese	Kuala Lumpur
16.	Shannen Jade Totten	23	171 cm	Eurasian	Kuala Lumpur
17.	Amrit Kaur Dhillon	27	170 cm	Indian	Selangor
18.	Shri Dahinoor John	25	163 cm	Indian	Selangor
19.	Felina Jesu Kumar	21	166 cm	Indian	Selangor
20.	Kimberley Mah Hwee Fen	21	168 cm	Chinese	Selangor
21.	Mellisa Wong Yi Sheong	22	169 cm	Chinese	Selangor
22.	Anne Michelle Stanley	25	167 cm	Indian	Selangor
23.	Priscilla Divya Pillai	23	166 cm	Indian	Selangor
24.	Yin Pui Kuan	25	168 cm	Chinese	Selangor
25.	Shahraswaty Nesaretnam	21	170 cm	Indian	Selangor
26.	Vivien Chew Yin Shang	26	165 cm	Chinese	Selangor
27.	Lim Yin Shi	24	165 cm	Chinese	Selangor
28.	Candace Yeap Xin Ying	24	168 cm	Chinese	Penang
29.	Crystal Tung Lu Yie	22	166 cm	Chinese	Penang
30.	Jane Teoh	20	178 cm	Chinese	Penang
31.	Charlotte Tan Bee Theng	24	168 cm	Chinese	Perak
32.	Khausalya Nadarajan	22	173 cm	Indian	Perak
33.	Marissa Anne Jansen	22	168 cm	Indian	Perak
34.	Sri Monisha Subranamian	21	170 cm	Indian	Negeri Sembilan
35.	Nithya Lakshami Therar	18	168 cm	Indian	Negeri Sembilan
36.	Nichole Lee Hui Wen	24	173 cm	Chinese	Malacca
37.	Sheryl Doi May Yen	22	174 cm	Chinese	Malacca
38.	Tavappriya Manidar	25	168 cm	Indian	Johor
39.	Fiollaa Redup	25	167 cm	Iban	Sarawak
40.	Jessy Gantle	23	165 cm	Bidayuh	Sarawak
41.	Phung Jin Wen	25	170 cm	Chinese	Sarawak
42.	Lysandra Gabriel	20	167 cm	Iban	Sarawak
43.	Elena Laurel Moujing	19	168 cm	Kadazandusun	Sabah
44.	Evita Patcey Edgar	20	160 cm	Kadazandusun	Sabah
45.	Kimberly Vung	22	168 cm	Chinese	Sabah
46.	Kimberly Ye Wan Chuin	25	165 cm	Chinese	Sabah
47.	Shervin Chaw	19	166 cm	Chinese	Sabah
48.	Natasha Aprillia Benggon	23	176 cm	Kadazandusun	Sabah
49.	Sherlene Cheah	18	169 cm	Chinese	Sabah
50.	Sofia Xena William	19	168 cm	Kadazandusun	Sabah

== Crossovers ==
Contestants who previously competed/appeared at other national beauty pageants:

Miss Universe Malaysia

- 2017 - Kirsten Wong Yee Mun (Top 50)
- 2017 - Mellisa Wong Yi Sheong (Top 50)

Miss World Malaysia

- 2019 - Alexis Sue-Ann (Winner)
- 2018 - Shannen Jade Totten (1st Runner-up)
- 2015 - Natasha Aprillia Jalius Benggon (4th Runner-up)

Miss International Malaysia

- 2019 - Charmaine Chew (Winner)

Miss Grand Malaysia

- 2020 - Jasebel Shalani Robert (Winner)
- 2019 - Lysandra Gabriel Storie (Top 12)
- 2017 - Maria Devonne Escobia (Top 7)

Miss Grand Kuala Lumpur

- 2017 - Maria Devonne Escobia (2nd Runner-up)

Miss Grand Sarawak

- 2019 - Lysandra Gabriel Storie (1st Runner-up)
- 2017 - Lysandra Gabriel Storie (5th Runner-up)

The Face of M.O Sarawak

- 2017 - Jessy Gantle (Winner)

Dewi Idola Berkarisma

- 2017 - Jessy Gantle (Finalists Top 15)

The Face of Beauty International

- 2016 - Jane Teoh Jun (Top 10)

The Face of Beauty International Malaysia

- 2016 - Jane Teoh Jun (Winner)

Miss Iban London Qualifiers of Borneo Hornbill Festival

- 2016 - Jessy Gantle (2nd Runner-up)

Miss Malaysia Kebaya Sarawak

- 2016 - Jessy Gantle (Top 14)

Unduk Ngadau

- 2015 - Natasha Aprillia Jalius Benggon (Top 7)

Unduk Ngadau Inanam

- 2015 - Natasha Aprillia Jalius Benggon (Winner)

Miss Cultural Harvest Festival

- 2015 - Jessy Gantle (Finalists Top 16)

Miss Earth Malaysia

- 2014 - Natasha Aprillia Jalius Benggon (3rd Runner-up)

Miss Earth Sabah

- 2014 - Natasha Aprillia Jalius Benggon (1st Runner-up)

Puteri Samarahan

- 2014 - Jessy Gantle (Winner)

Ratu Kebaya 1Malaysia

- 2012 - Jessy Gantle (Top 12)

== See also ==
- Bachelor of Malaysia
