= Miss Universe Malaysia 2025 =

- Date: 12 September 2025
- Presenters: Hansen Lee; Nadia Heng
- Entertainment: Joe Flizzow; Priscilla Abby; Belle Sisoski
- Theme: Redefining Your Journey
- Venue: Majestic Ballroom, The Majestic Hotel Kuala Lumpur
- Entrants: 16
- Placements: 8
- Winner: Chloe Lim; Kuala Lumpur
- Photogenic: Jen Li; Kuala Lumpur

External videos
- GALA FINALS of Miss Universe Malaysia 2025

Miss Universe Malaysia 2025 was the 58th edition of the Miss Universe Malaysia pageant.

Chloe Lim of Kuala Lumpur was crowned as the winner at the end of the event. Lim will represent Malaysia at Miss Universe 2025 in Thailand.

== Background ==
On July 31, Charissa Chong, Miss Grand Malaysia 2022 and first runner-up of Miss Universe Malaysia 2020, was announced as the new national director.

=== Official national costume designer ===
The organization, in collaboration with Persatuan Pentas Anak Seni Malaysia (PPASM), announced Malaysia’s Top National Costume Designer Grand Final, to be held at Sabah International Convention Centre on August 31. The winner will be collaborating with the organization for the official national costume for the Miss Universe 2025 stage. The grand winner was a costume inspired by the Bajau Sama traditional attire by Sabahan designer, Mell Sulaiman.

=== New crown ===
The organization has unveiled the new official crown ahead of the gala night this year, revealing the "Eternal Blossom" in partnership with A Vintage Collezione. The crown is made out of 18K white gold and 16.39 carats of natural diamonds.

=== Location and date ===
On August 21, the organization scheduled the finals for September 12, through an announcement on their official Facebook page. The pageant will be held at the Majestic Ballroom, The Majestic Hotel Kuala Lumpur.

== Results ==
=== Placements ===
Placement	Contestant
Miss Universe Malaysia 2025	Chloe Lim
1st Runner-Up	Priyaa Simmi
2nd Runner-Up	Jenli Lee
Top 8	Malveen Kaur; Ranmeet Jassal; Priyanka Sockanathan; Elina Cheah; Priscilla Yap

=== Subsidiaries titles and sponsor awards ===
Award	Contestant
Miss Elegance	Jenli Lee
Miss Photogenic	Jenli Lee
Miss Bright Skin	Jenli Lee
Miss Crowning Glory	Jenli Lee
Miss Love Life	Chloe Lim
Miss Fitness	Chloe Lim
Miss Spritzer	Chloe Lim
Miss Social Media	Malveen Kaur

== Pageant ==
=== Format ===
During the coronation night, the contestants competed in the national costume, swimsuit competition, and evening gown round after which the field was narrowed to 8 semi-finalists. Afterward, the top 8 semi-finalists then competed in the question-and-answer portion, and the top 3 finalists were announced followed by the Miss Universe Malaysia 2025 crowning.

=== Selection committee ===
==== Audition judges ====
Audition judges consisted of the following personalities:

- Datin Seri Livonia Ricky - Chairperson of Miss Universe Malaysia Organization
- James Tan - Founder and director of Evenstar Management
- Charissa Chong - National director of Miss Universe Malaysia Organization
- Rubini Sambanthan - Actress and model

==== Pre-judging panel ====
Pre-judging panel consisted of the following personalities:

- Datin Seri Livonia Ricky - Chairperson of Miss Universe Malaysia Organization
- Sabrina Beneett - Miss Universe Malaysia 2014
- Marlene Lim - Pageant consultant and health equity advocate
- Eva Shahrul - Make-up stylist

==== Gala night judging panel ====
The panel of judges consisted of the following personalities:

- Datin Seri Livonia Ricky - Chairperson of Miss Universe Malaysia Organization
- Marlene Lim - Pageant consultant and health equity advocate
- Siti Rahayu Baharin - Child rights activist with Yayasan Chow Kit
- Dr. Jillian Heng - Co-Founder of Bright Clinic
- Fenti Riana - Head of Special Projects, Boost Juice Bars Malaysia
- Ashlee Ng - General Manager of Consumer Products Division of L’Oréal Malaysia & Singapore

== Delegates ==
=== Top 16 ===
The Top 16 finalists were announced on July 31 during a press conference at Holiday Inn Bangsar.

Delegate	Age	Height	State	Profession
Bhadrani Nagendran	27	1.60 m (5 ft 3 in)	Kuala Lumpur	Social Worker
Chloe Chin	24	1.60 m (5 ft 3 in)	Selangor	Business Strategist
Chloe Lim	27	1.74 m (5 ft 8 1/2 in)	Kuala Lumpur	Management Consultant
Elaine Cheah	26	1.71 m (5 ft 7 1/2 in)	Kuala Lumpur	Recruitment Consultant
Elina Cheah	24	1.71 m (5 ft 7 1/2 in)	Selangor	Freelance Model
Jen Li	28	1.68 m (5 ft 6 in)	Kuala Lumpur	Model & Dive Trip Coordinator
Joey Leng	25	1.66 m (5 ft 5 1/2 in)	Perak	Content Creator
Kavita Sanglish	26	1.63 m (5 ft 4 in)	Kuala Lumpur	Psychology Graduate
Keerthanaah Parthipan	25	1.68 m (5 ft 6 in)	Negeri Sembilan	Psychology Student
Malveen Kaur	31	1.68 m (5 ft 6 in)	Johor	Emcee & Live Host
Priscilla Yap	25	1.68 m (5 ft 6 in)	Kuala Lumpur	Engineer & Pilates Instructor
Priyaa Simmi	30	1.70 m (5 ft 7 in)	Kuala Lumpur	Business Advisor
Priyanka Sockanathan	24	1.70 m (5 ft 7 in)	Kuala Lumpur	Freelance Model & Content Creator
Ranmeet Jassal	33	1.70 m (5 ft 7 in)	Selangor	Medical Doctor
Tan Su Jie	25	1.67 m (5 ft 5 1/2 in)	Melaka	Global Business Journalism Student
Valenice Tiong	36	1.76 m (5 ft 9 1/2 in)	Sarawak	Tour Operations & Sales Executive
