= Francisca Luhong James =

Malaysian model

- Born: Francisca Luhong James; 14 October 1995 (age 30); Kuching, Sarawak, Malaysia
- Education: Universiti Teknologi MARA
- Occupation: Model
- Height: 1.75 m (5 ft 9 in)
- Beauty pageant titleholder
- Title: Miss Universe Malaysia 2020
- Years active: 2015–present
- Major competitions: Miss World Malaysia 2016 (4th runner-up); Miss World Malaysia 2018 (top 5); Miss Universe Malaysia 2020 (winner); Miss Universe 2020 (unplaced)

Francisca Luhong James (born 14 October 1995) is a Malaysian model and beauty pageant titleholder who was crowned Miss Universe Malaysia 2020. She represented her country at Miss Universe 2020, and did not reach the top 21, marking the 50 years of unplacement for Malaysia at Miss Universe since Josephine Lena Wong at Miss Universe 1970.

== Early life and career ==
James was born 14 October 1995 in Kuching, Sarawak. She is of mixed heritage from Kayan, Kenyah, Iban, and Dayak people. She is the eldest of three siblings and the only daughter of James Mering Bungan and Pauline Japok. She has a degree in mass communication majoring in public relations.

== Pageantry ==
=== Miss Cultural Harvest Festival 2015 ===
At 19, James participated in Miss Cultural Harvest Festival 2015, an annual ethnic beauty pageant held during the Sarawak Harvest and Folklore Festival. She was the second runner-up of the competition.

=== Miss World Malaysia 2016 ===
In 2016, James reached the top five at Miss World Malaysia 2016. She also won Miss Talent, Miss Natural Beauty, and Miss Elegant awards.

=== Miss World Malaysia 2018 ===
In 2018, James reached the top five at Miss World Malaysia 2018. She also won the People's Choice and Top Model awards.

=== Miss Universe Malaysia 2020 ===
In 2020, James won Miss Universe Malaysia 2020, earning her the right to represent Malaysia at Miss Universe 2020. The final of Miss Universe Malaysia 2020 was held on 5 September 2020 at Damansara, Petaling Jaya, Selangor. James was the eighth Miss Universe Malaysia from Sarawak and also the first Dayak woman.

=== Miss Universe 2020 ===
James represented Malaysia at Miss Universe 2020, held in Hollywood, Florida, US on 16 May 2021. She did not reach the top 21, marking the 50 years of unplacement for Malaysia at Miss Universe since Josephine Lena Wong at Miss Universe 1970.

==== Controversy ====
During her reign, James was accused of having previously been a nude model on adult websites, which she denied. This resulted in her being forced to step down as the titleholder of Miss Universe Malaysia.

Awards and achievements
Preceded by Mellinda Lee Penang	Miss World Malaysia (4th Runner-Up); 2016	Succeeded by None
Preceded by Shweta Sekhon Kuala Lumpur	Miss Universe Malaysia; 2020	Succeeded by Cheam Wei Yeng Selangor
