= HELP University =

Private university in Kuala Lumpur, Malaysia

- Universiti HELP
- Former names: HELP Institute (1986), HELP University College (2004)
- Motto: The University of Achievers
- Established: 1 April 1986
- Chancellor: Datuk Dr. Paul Chan Tuck Hoong
- Vice-Chancellor: Professor Dr. Andy Liew Teik Kooi
- Location: Wisma CL, HELP University, No. 5, Jalan Sri Semantan 1, KL and Subang Bestari, Subang 2, No. 2, Jalan Persiaran Cakerawala, Shah Alam,, Kuala Lumpur & Selangor, Malaysia
- Campus: Wisma CL:1.04-acre freehold site with a gross floor area (GFA) of 222,000 sq ft Subang Bestari campus: • Phase 2A Size: 3.3 acres (about 15,147 square meters). • Phase 1 Size: 4.6 acres. • Total Site Area: 23 acres (including the wider precinct).; Both campuses are classified as suburban.
- Website: www.university.help.edu.my

HELP University; (formerly known as HELP Institute) is a private university located in Kuala Lumpur, Malaysia.

HELP is an acronym for Higher Education Learning Philosophy (HELP).

== History ==
HELP Institute was founded on 1 April, 1986, by husband-and-wife Datuk Dr. Paul Chan Tuck Hoong and Datin Chan-Low Kam Yoke with a budget of RM 25,000.

Originally located in a shop lot in Kampung Attap, Kuala Lumpur, the modest campus began with its library housed in a garage. At the time, it had just eight teachers and 30 students, offering the University of London External Degree Programmes and the British A-Levels. It was the first institution outside of the United Kingdom to offer the University of London's Diploma in Economics.

HELP Institute was the pioneer of twinning programmes, allowing students to complete one or two years of the curriculum of the partner universities in Malaysia, then transfer to the overseas institution to complete their degrees.

In 1989, HELP Institute relocated to a building along Jalan Ipoh. In 1991, it moved again to a newer and larger purpose built campus located in Pusat Bandar Damansara, which underwent significant expansion over time.

In 2004, HELP Institute was granted university college status by the Ministry of Higher Education (Malaysia), and was renamed to HELP University College. In 2005, HELP Academy was established to offer programmes from partner universities.

In 2007, HELP International Corporation Berhad, the holding company overseeing its education institutions, was publicly listed on Bursa Malaysia.

In 2011, it was granted full university status and was renamed to HELP University.

On 24 November 2022, HELP University established the Centre for Neuropsychology to support teaching, research, and clinical services in the field.

HELP University is a member of the HELP Education Group. The group consists of HELP University, HELP Academy, HELP International School, Crescendo-HELP International School, and Tunku Putra-HELP International School.

== Logo ==
HELP University, HELP Academy and several of its subsidiaries share a common corporate logo featuring two hands: one extended in assistance, symbolising a helping hand reaching out to support the other.

== Campuses ==
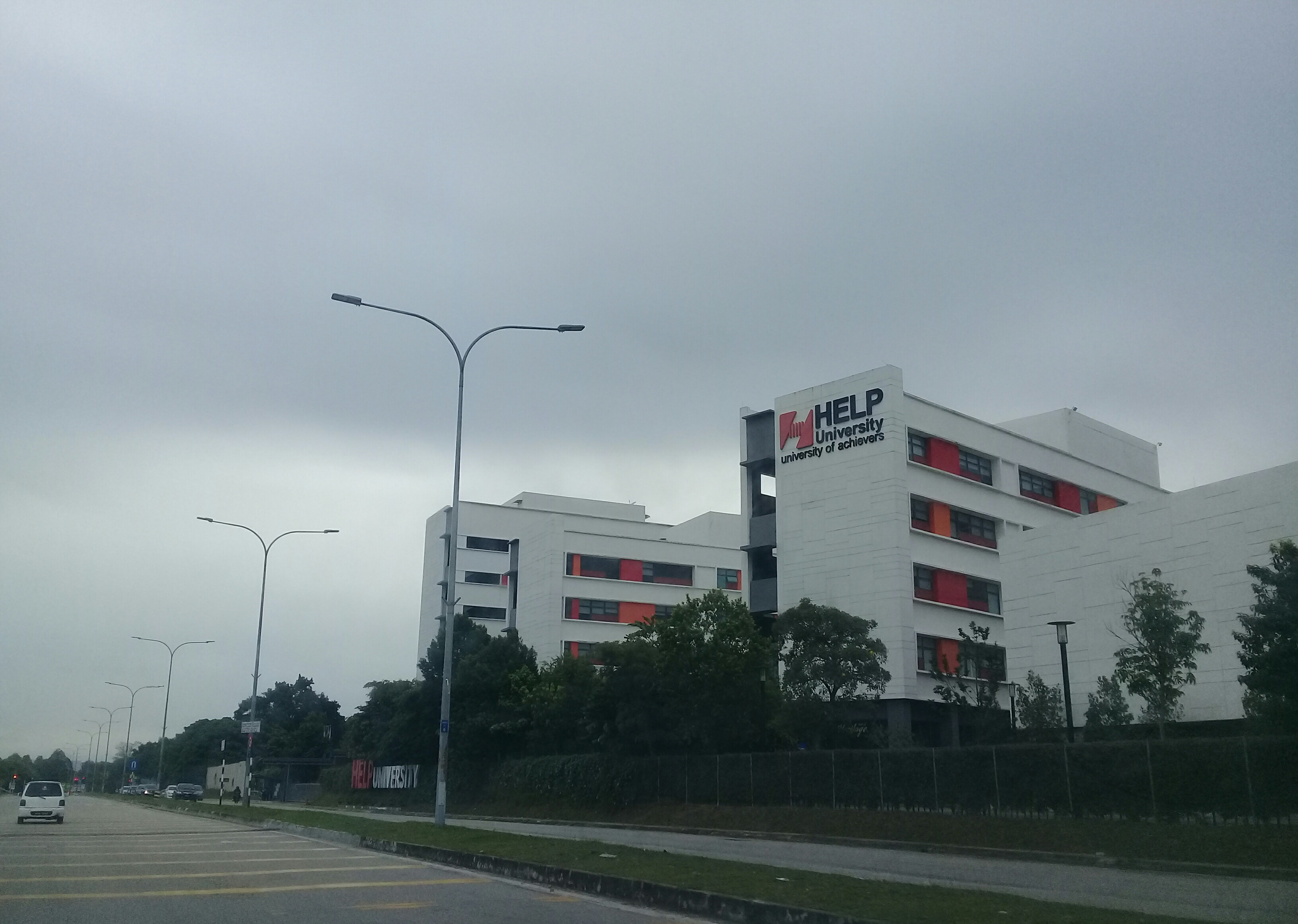
HELP University Subang Bestari campus.

HELP University has two campuses, one located in Damansara Heights, Kuala Lumpur and the other located in Subang Bestari, Shah Alam, Selangor. HELP University's Subang Bestari campus opened in April 2016, and is the largest of the two campuses.

HELP University's Subang Bestari campus opened its doors in April 2016 and is the larger campus of the two. The campus won the IFLA Asia Pacific Awards 2019, Honorable Mention; and the Malaysia Landscape Architecture Awards MLAA 2018, Honour, Landscape Design Award Professional Category. Both awards were won by Verona Landscape Architecture that designed the Subang Bestari campus landscape.

The Subang Bestari campus also won the PAM Awards 2017, Education (Commendation).

== Faculties and Centres ==
HELP University has seven academic faculties, a Centre for Continuing Professional Development, and an Institute for Crime and Criminology. The faculties are:

- Faculty of Behavioural Sciences
- Faculty of Business, Economics and Accounting
- HELP Matriculation Centre
- Faculty of Law and Government,
- Faculty of Computing and Digital Technology,
- Faculty of Communication, Media and Creative Industries.
- ELM Graduate School
- School of Hospitality and Tourism
- Institute of Criminology and Justice
- Department of Education and English

== Notable alumni ==
=== Media and Entertainment ===
- Sarimah Ibrahim (Psychology) – TV host, radio announcer, actress and singer.
- Lisa Surihani (Law) – model, actress, and TV host.
- Jane Teoh (Accounting) – model, Miss Universe Malaysia 2018.
- Shweta Sekhon (Marketing) – model, actress, and Miss Universe Malaysia 2019.
- Chris Cheong – magician, mentalist, and illusionist.

=== Sports ===
- Sara Yap Kim Wen (Psychology) – Bronze Medalist in Taekwondo at the 2018 Asian Games.

=== Business ===
- Venon Tian (Law & MBA) - Group CEO, Zus Coffee

== Awards and Rankings ==
- HELP University secured 46th place globally in the "Visionary Leadership" category of the 2025 World University Rankings for Innovation (WURI).
- HELP University and HELP Academy were rated Berdaya Saing (Competitive), the highest category, in the 2022 ratings by the Malaysian Ministry of Higher Education. Institutions were evaluated upon criteria set by Malaysia's Higher Education Institutions ratings.
- HELP University was the first university in Southeast Asia to be awarded five stars in eight categories by Quacquarelli Symonds (QS) Star Rating System in April 2020. The categories include Teaching, Internationalisation, Employability, Academic Development, Facilities, Social Responsibility, Inclusiveness, and Programme Strength for its Master of Business Administration (MBA).
- HELP University was ranked No.1 among 650 universities in Asia for the Outbound Student Exchange Program by QS Rankings: Asia 2021.
- The university was ranked between 401 and 450 in the QS Asian University Rankings 2021.
- In 2019, the Malaysian Digital Economy Corporation (MDEC) granted HELP University the Premier Digital Tech University (PDTU) status, recognizing it as one of Malaysia's top tertiary institutions specializing in digital technology.
- HELP University was rated six stars for Human Resource Management, Language Studies, Education, Banking, Psychology, Mathematics and Statistics, Counselling, and Law by TalentBank in the National Graduate Employability Index in 2023.
- HELP University is widely regarded as the pioneer in Psychology degree programmes in Malaysia and is often known as the "University of Psychology" locally.
- HELP University's Psychology degree programme is rated 6 Stars for Psychology in the Malaysian Graduate Employability Index by TalentBank.
- The Six Star ranking means that our Psychology programme has secured a Top 5 position within its category (benchmarked among private universities) based on employer validation and graduate employability data collected by Talentbank. •HELP University has consistently achieved high marks from Talentbank in Psychology and related behavioral sciences over multiple years (including previous recognition in 2022, 2023, 2025, and 2026)
- HELP University’s FEBA programme is the largest and oldest faculty at HELP University (established in 1986), renowned for strong corporate links and high graduate employability. • Its accounting degrees hold recognitions and exemptions from major global bodies such as CPA Australia, ICAEW, ACCA, MAICSA, and MIA and has been Rated 6 stars for Banking, Human Resource Management, and Accounting.
- HELP University is also famous for high-performing legal education and long-standing articulation pathways to top universities in the UK, Australia, and New Zealand. • The degree programme is rated 6 stars for Law by TalentBank.• HELP University’s Computing and Digital Technology degree programme is recognised for its specialised tech curricula and digital innovation. The programme has been awarded the Premier Digital Tech University (PDTU) status by the Malaysian Digital Economy Corporation (MDEC).
