= Kerry Hill =

Australian architect

- Hill at CAA Conference Dhaka 2013
- Born: William Kerry Hill; 19 June 1943; Perth, Western Australia, Australia
- Died: 26 August 2018 (aged 75); Singapore
- Education: Perth Technical College
- Alma mater: University of Western Australia
- Occupation: Architect
- Spouse: Ruth Hill

William Kerry Hill AO (19 June 1943 – 26 August 2018) was an Australian architect who specialised in hotel design in tropical Asia. Based in Singapore, his works were known for their features of steeply pitched pavilion roofs, shaded walkways, and an abundance of water features, affectionately dubbed the "Kerry Hill touch".

Hill has been widely named as an influential figure in refining tropical modernist architecture and defining the Bali architectural style for his works on numerous hotels on the island. Sri Lankan architect Geoffrey Bawa, whom he had a personal friendship with, influenced his early works "by understanding and embracing the architectural traditions of the East".

== Early life and career ==
Hill was born in Perth, Western Australia, on 19 June 1943, the same year his father died in the Battle of Britain. Hill grew up in northwestern Australia, and spent his teens travelling around the country, ultimately influencing his decision to become an architect. He studied architecture at Perth Technical College before later transferring to the University of Western Australia; he graduated from the latter in 1968, being amongst the first architecture students to graduate from the school. As a student, he worked for Perth's Kierath and Waldron Architects, known for their clinker brick houses. Between 1969 and 1971, Hill worked for the Perth-based Howlett & Bailey architecture practice, on projects including the building of the Perth Concert Hall.

== Career ==
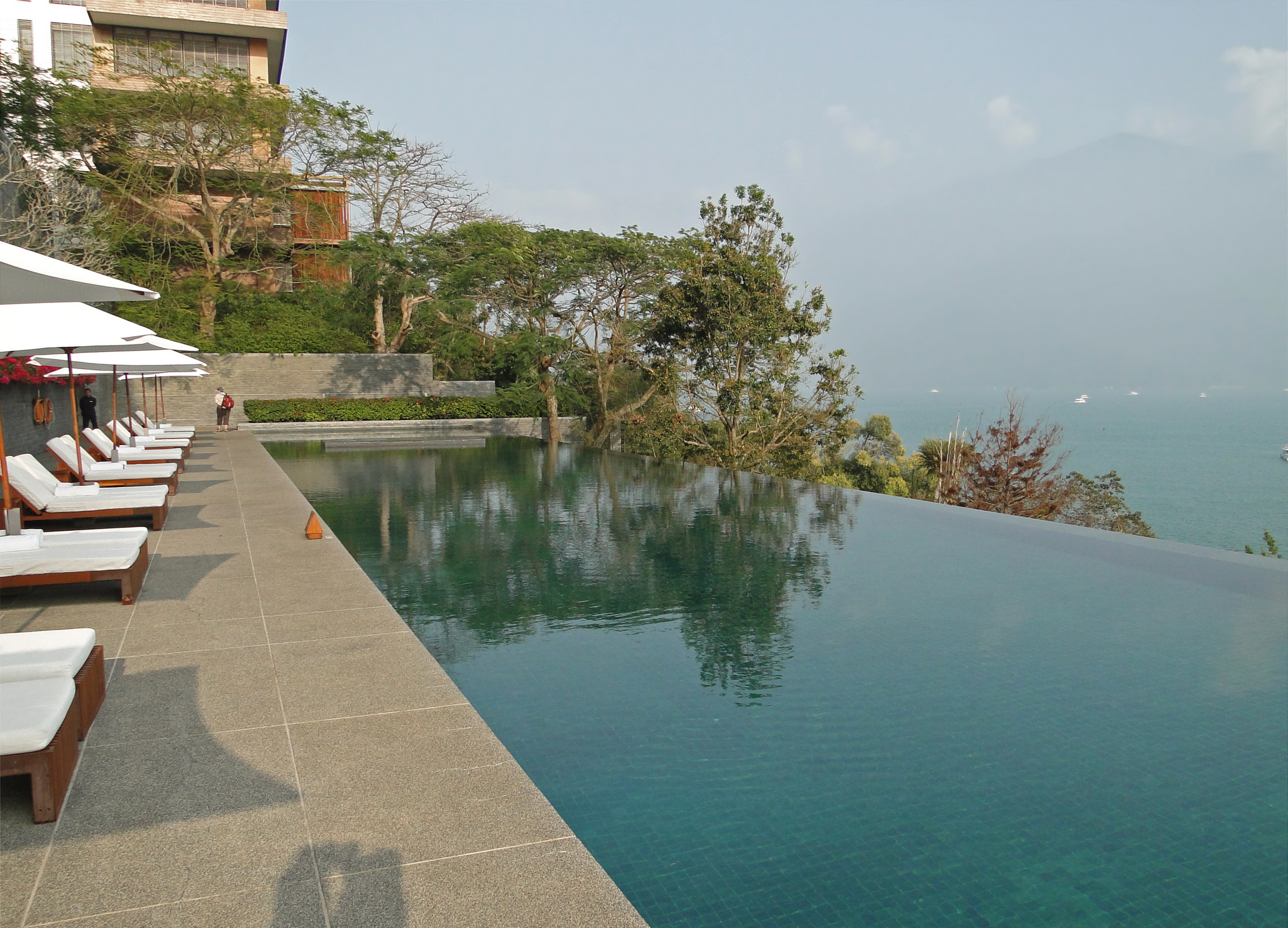
The Lalu, Taiwan (2002)

Hill subsequently left Australia in 1971 to work at Hong Kong-based practice Palmer & Turner, marking the start of Hill's decades-long career in Asia. His position at Palmer & Turner would later send him to Bali, Indonesia to work on the construction of Peter Muller's Bali Hyatt in Sanur. He would spend the next seven years with Palmer & Turner in Indonesia moving between Jakarta and Bali; from 1974 to 1978 he managed Palmer & Turner's Jakarta branch office.

In 1979, Hill moved to Singapore to established his own architectural practice, Kerry Hill Architects, where he would eventually acquire permanent residency and remain for the remainder of his life. His practice was commenced with many commissions from Indonesian hotelier Adrian Zecha, designing the Amanusa and Serai hotels in Bali; along with the designs of Zecha's Chedi, Beaufort Sentosa, and Datai hotels in Bandung, Singapore, and Langkawi, respectively, among others. In particular the Datai hotel in Langkawi cemented Hill's reputation in his reverence for a place's setting and culture. His design for the resort, which was completed in 1994, has been said to counter contemporary approaches, having built rooms within the land's rainforest whilst ensuring minimal construction impact on the setting's environment.

In 2013, Hill released a 440-page book entitled Crafting Modernism, detailing his approach and numerous projects over the years. Hill later lectured architecture at various universities, including the National University of Singapore, the University of Hawaii, the University of Western Australia and the University of Queensland, among other places. His work has been exhibited in Perth.

== Style ==
Hill has been praised for his region-sensitive approach that accounts for a locale's site and climate, providing a modern interpretation over a traditional setting. His style has been widely described to exude the traditions and cultures in which his projects are set, incorporating and adapting local materials and construction practices into his designs. His works have been said to have sought traditional designs as a reference in his modernist buildings through association and suggestion. Richard Hassell of Singapore's WOHA spoke of Hill saying, "His design amplifies what it means to be in a particular place, what sets that place apart". In a 2014 interview with Dezeen, Hill attributes his approach on the features of his designs to contextual sensitivities, ensuring that each project is uniquely drawn according to the needs of their settings. He further added his distaste for the cookie-cutter approach, or "plonk-architecture" as he called it, making references to Frank Gehry and his trademark style.

== Awards and recognition ==
In 1995 he was awarded the Kenneth F. Brown Asia Pacific Culture and Architecture Design Award, in 2001 the Aga Khan Award for Architecture, in 2003 the RAIA Robin Boyd Award for the Ogilvie House, and in 2006 the Royal Australian Institute of Architects Gold Medal. In 2010, he received the President's Design Award, awarded by then-President of Singapore, S. R. Nathan. He was appointed as a recipient of the Order of Australia in 2012 for his services in architecture and for being an ambassador of Australian design in South-east Asia. In the same year, he won the award for Best Housing Design at the World Architecture Festival, for his design of the Martin No. 38 residential project in Singapore. His work has been published in A+U (Japan); Architectural Digest (Germany); Architectural Review, Wallpaper, World Architecture (UK), Architecture Australia, Monument (Australia); Indian Architect & Builder, Singapore Architect, and Space (Singapore).

== Death and legacy ==
Hill died aged 75 in his Singapore home on August 26, 2018, after a battle with cancer. His death prompted many tributes, including among them from Richard Kirk, then president of the Australian Institute of Architects; he credited Hill's work to have defined the region's tropical modernist style and named Hill one of Australia's most renowned architects. His approach and style has influenced the styles of WOHA's Wong Mun Summ and Richard Hassell, Ernesto Bedmar of Bedmar and Shi, Richard Ho, Cheong Yew Kuan; the latter most of whom had been a student of Hill's.

== Notable projects ==
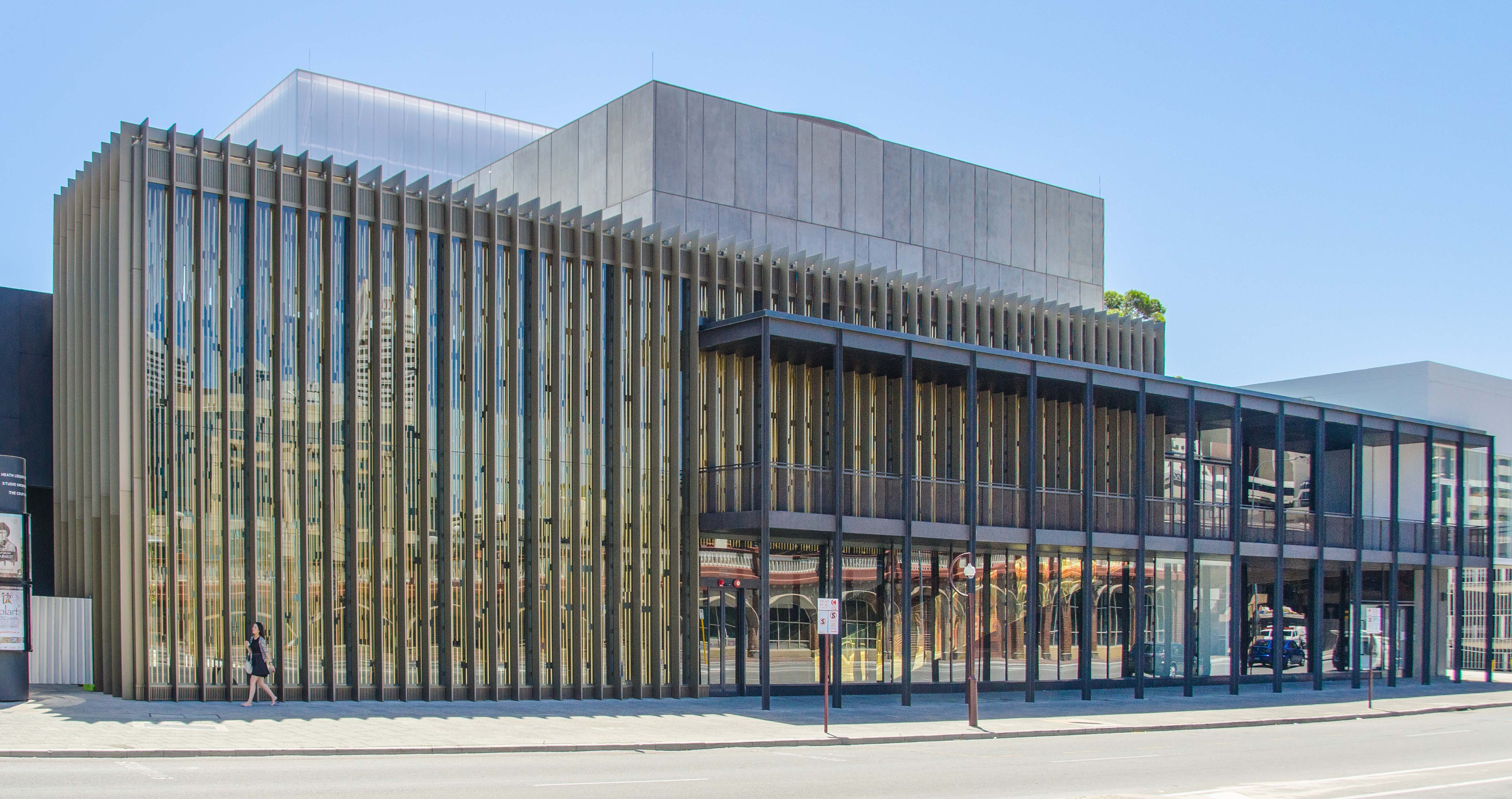
State Theatre Centre of Western Australia

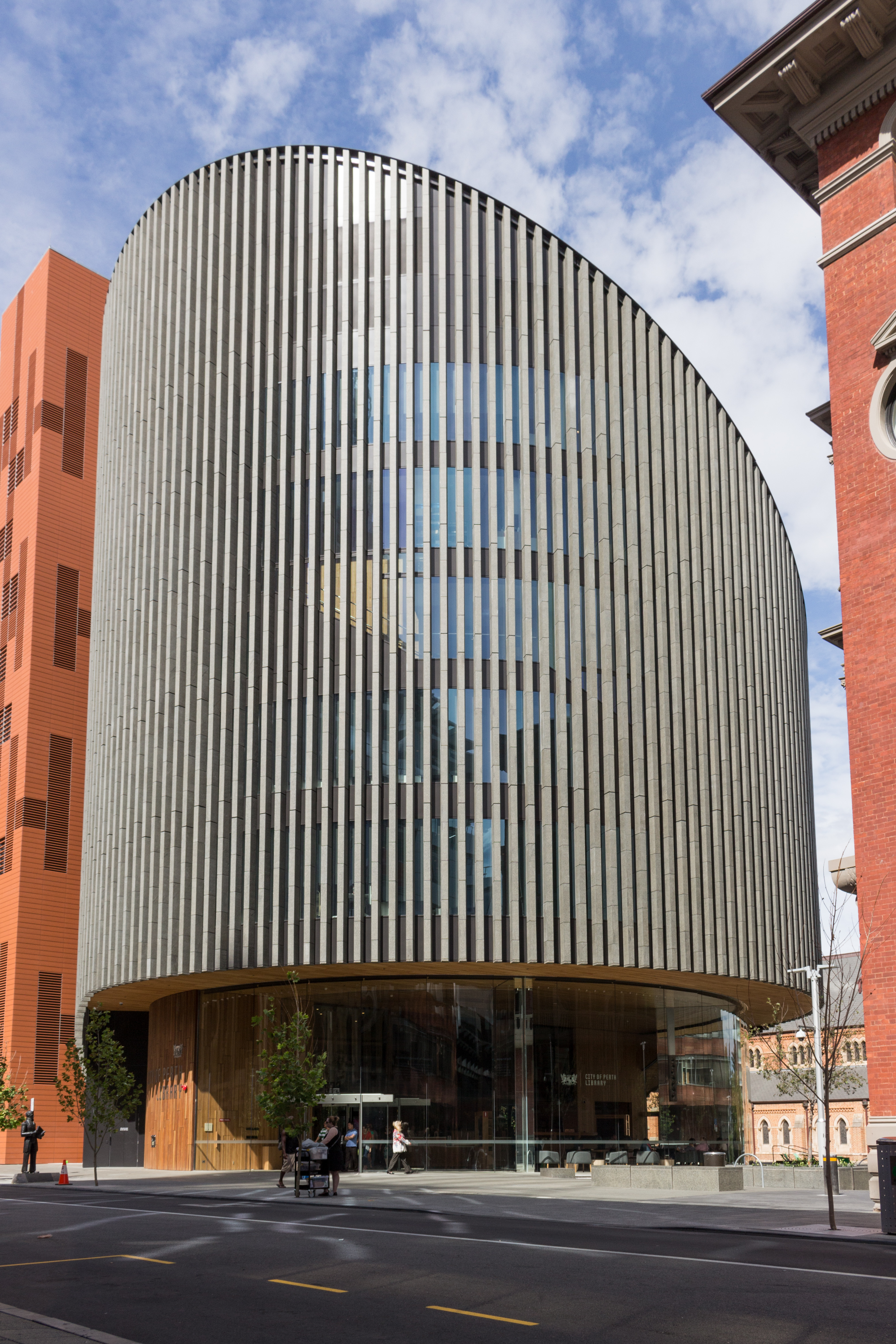
City of Perth Library

- Darwin Centre, Darwin, Australia (1986)
- Sukhothai Hotel, Bangkok, Thailand (1991)
- Amanusa Hotel, Bali, Indonesia (1992)
- The Chedi Hotel, Bandung, Indonesia (1994)
- The Serai Hotel, Bali, Indonesia (1994)
- The Datai Hotel, Langkawi, Malaysia (1994)
- Singapore Cricket Association Pavilion, Singapore (1999)
- The Lalu Hotel, Sun Moon Lake, Taiwan (2002)
- Ogilvie House, Sunshine Beach, Queensland, Australia (2002)
- ITC Sonar, Kolkata, India (2003)
- The Chedi Hotel, Chiang Mai, Thailand (2003)
- Amankora, Bhutan (2007)
- State Theatre Centre of Western Australia, Perth, Australia (2010)
- City of Perth Library, Perth, Australia (2014)
- Aman Tokyo (2015)
- COMO The Treasury Hotel, Perth, Australia (2015)
- Amanyangyun (2018)
- Aman Kyoto (2019)
- One and Only Desaru, Malaysia (2020)
- RAH FALHU, Maldives (2021)
- The Conlay, Malaysia (2025)
- EQ West, Perth, Australia (2026)

== General references ==
- Goad, Philip; Pieris, Anoma; Bingham-Hall, Patrick (2014). New Directions in Tropical Asian Architecture. Tuttle Publishing. ISBN 978-0804844437.
