= Miss Universe Malaysia 1969 =

Beauty pageant

- Date: 23 June 1969
- Venue: Johore Diamond Jubilee Hall, Grand Mutiara Hotel, Johor Bahru, Johore
- Entrants: 11
- Placements: 5
- Withdrawals: Sabah; Sarawak
- Winner: Rosemary Wan; Selangor (Assumed); Sabrina Loo; Penang (Resigned)

Miss Malaysia 1969, the 4th edition of the Miss Universe Malaysia, was held on 23 June 1969 at the Johore Diamond Jubilee Hall (Dewan Jubli Intan), Grand Mutiara Hotel, Johor. Sabrina Loo of Penang was crowned by the wife of Tunku Mahkota Johor Tunku Abdul Jalil, Tengku Sahariah.

However, Loo was not able to represent Malaysia on the grounds of not willing to compete. Following the rules of the pageant, in for any reason the winner cannot fulfill her duty, the runner-up will take over the crown and title. In this case, the runner-up Rosemary Wan replaced her as the winner. She represented Malaysia at Miss Universe 1969 pageant in Miami, Florida. This was the first time in the history of Miss Universe Malaysia where the runner-up represents the country at the international stage.

== Results ==
| Final Results | Contestants |
|---|---|
| Miss Malaysia 1969 | Penang – Sabrina Loo (Resigned) |
| 1st Runner–Up | Selangor – Rosemary Wan (Assumed title) |
| 2nd Runner–Up | Negri Sembilan – Sandra Van Geyzel |

== Delegates ==
- Johore - Badariah Abdul Aziz
- Kedah - Sharifah Noor Syed Salim
- Kelantan - Badariah Ariffin
- Malacca - Lisa Lee
- Negri Sembilan - Sandra Jacqueline Van Geyzel
- Pahang - Rosalina Mehmet
- Penang - Sabrina Loo
- Perak - Catherine Da Silva
- Perlis - Chang Choon Thow
- Selangor - Rosemary Wan Chow Mei
- Trengganu - Khairon Mohamed Noor
