= Amanyangyun =

Resort hotel in Shanghai, China

- Entrance to an antique villa at Amanyangyun

General information
- Location: 6161 Yuanjiang Road; Minhang District, Shanghai, China
- Opening: January 8, 2018; 8 years ago
- Owner: Aman Resorts
- Operator: Aman Resorts

Design and construction
- Architect: Kerry Hill Architects
- Developer: Ma Dadong
- Awards: Michelin key

Other information
- Number of rooms: 37
- Number of restaurants: 5

Website
- aman.com/resorts/amanyangyun

Amanyangyun is a luxury resort hotel in Minhang District, Shanghai, China, operated by Aman Resorts. It opened on January 8, 2018, as the fourth Aman property in China and the first in Shanghai. The resort was built around 50 Ming and Qing dynasty houses and roughly 10,000 camphor trees relocated over a 15-year period from Fuzhou, Jiangxi Province, after their original site was threatened by a reservoir project. The project was conceived and financed by Chinese entrepreneur Ma Dadong, and the buildings were designed and restored by Kerry Hill Architects, which were among the firm's final completed commissions before founder Kerry Hill's death in August 2018.

The resort won Hotel of the Year at the AHEAD Asia Awards in 2019 and holds one Michelin Key.

== History ==
=== Threat to the original site (2002–2006) ===
In 2002, Fuzhou, Jiangxi-born entrepreneur Ma Dadong learned during a visit home that construction of the Liao Fang Reservoir, approved by local authorities, would submerge several villages containing Ming and Qing dynasty houses as well as a forest of camphor trees, some believed to be over 1,000 years old. Construction of the dam was completed in 2006. Rather than let the structures and trees be destroyed, Ma financed their disassembly and transport approximately 700 kilometres (435 mi) to a site outside Shanghai.

=== Relocation and construction (2002–2017) ===
The relocation of the houses and trees took place over roughly 15 years and involved botanists, engineers, and craftsmen. Each of the 50 houses was disassembled brick by brick and stone by stone, catalogued, and stored before reconstruction; some contained carvings and family records dating back centuries. The roughly 10,000 relocated trees (one account puts the precise figure at 10,502) ranged from 20 to 50 tonnes each once pruned, and the largest, an approximately 1,000-year-old specimen later known as the King Camphor Tree or Emperor Tree, required the demolition of a motorway toll booth to allow its transport.

Ma invited Aman Resorts to become involved in the project in 2009, and the company engaged Kerry Hill Architects to design a masterplan integrating the restored houses into a new resort. Twenty-six of the houses were ultimately rebuilt on the Shanghai site.

=== Opening (2018) ===
Amanyangyun opened to guests on January 8, 2018. The resort's name combines yang, meaning "to cultivate," and yun, meaning "cloud."

== Architecture ==
Amanyangyun was designed by Kerry Hill Architects as a contemporary walled village, combining the restored antique houses with newly built courtyard suites and pavilions arranged around the replanted camphor forest. The 13 restored antique houses were converted into villas retaining their original external brick, roof tiles, and timber pillars, while their interiors were updated with contemporary amenities including underfloor heating and Wi-Fi. At the centre of the property is Nan Shufang, a cultural pavilion modelled on the traditional Chinese scholar's studio, used for calligraphy, tea ceremonies, and displays of antique art. A private theatre on the property screens a documentary on the relocation project for arriving guests.

Amanyangyun is regarded as one of Kerry Hill's last completed projects before his death in August 2026.

== Facilities ==
The resort includes five restaurants, among them the Italian restaurant Arva and the Chinese restaurant Lazhu, which serves dishes from Ma Dadong's native Jiangxi province. Other facilities include an Aman Spa, an organic garden, a Children's Discovery Centre, and a King Camphor Tree seedling programme centred on the estate's oldest tree.

The property features private residences separate from the operating hotel. A s of the Michelin Guide's current listing, the operating resort comprises 37 rooms across suites, pavilions, and remaining antique villas.

== Reception ==
Amanyangyun won Hotel of the Year at the AHEAD Asia Awards 2019, along with awards in the Guestrooms, Hotel Conversion, and Visual Identity categories, the most of any hotel that year. The AHEAD jury praised the project's "brilliant hard-fought efforts to preserve the historical and cultural heritage of a province." The resort holds one Michelin Key.

CNN described the relocation project as "one of the most extraordinary examples of philanthropic conservation in modern China."

== Operation ==
As of 2026, the resort's general manager is Christophe Olivro, who also serves as Aman's regional manager for China.
