= State Theatre Centre of Western Australia =

Theatre in Perth, Western Australia

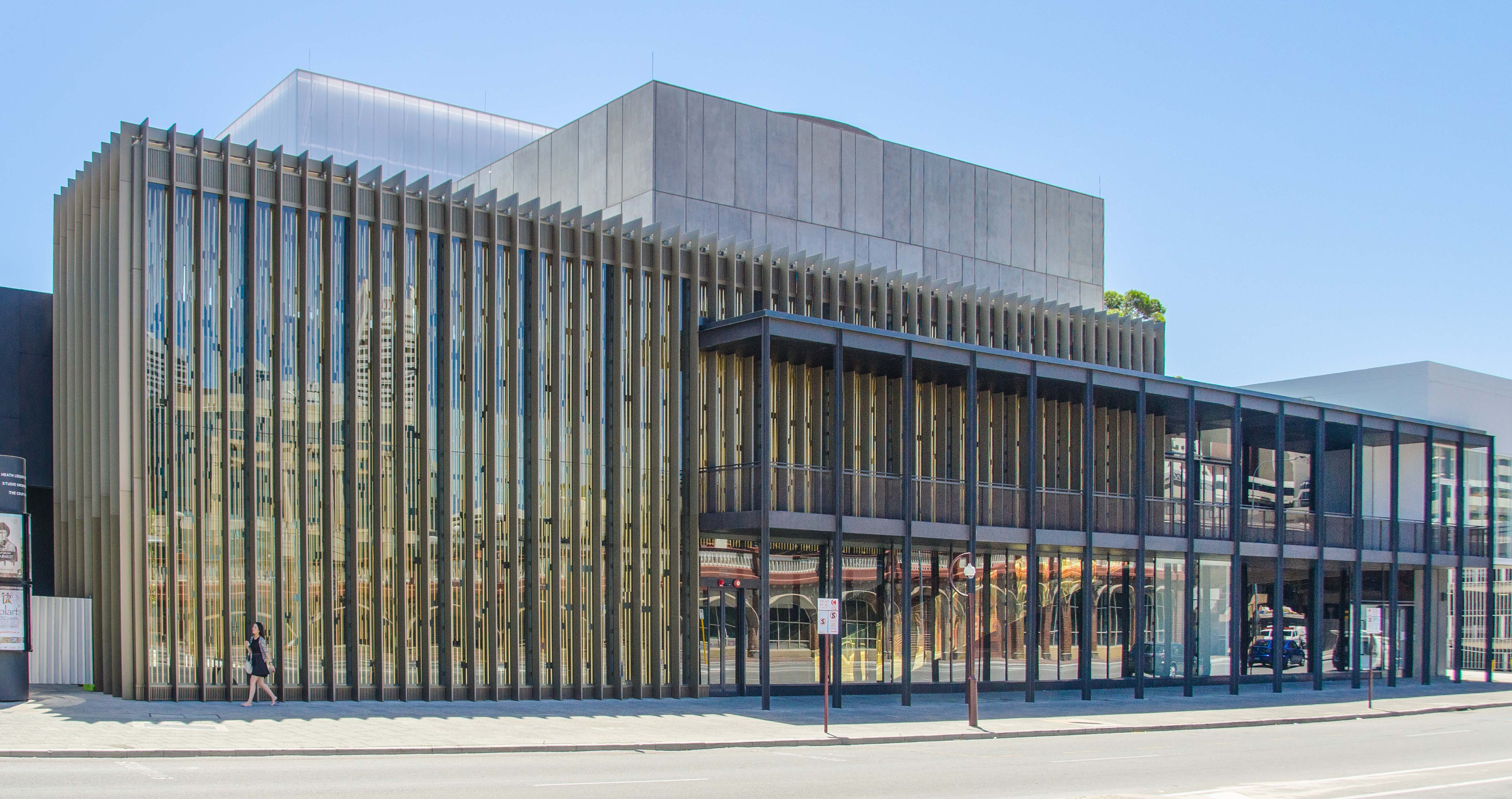
- Roe Street façade (facing south) of the State Theatre of Western Australia
- Interactive map of State Theatre Centre of Western Australia
- Address: 174–176 William Street; Perth; Australia
- Coordinates: 31°57′00″S 115°51′34″E
- Owner: Government of Western Australia
- Operator: Perth Theatre Trust
- Capacity: 575 – Heath Ledger Theatre; 234 – Studio Underground; 200 – The Courtyard

Construction
- Opened: 27 January 2011
- Years active: 2011–present
- Architect: Kerry Hill Architects

Tenants
- Black Swan State Theatre Company; Perth Theatre Company

Website
- www.ptt.wa.gov.au/venues/state-theatre-centre-of-wa/

The State Theatre Centre of Western Australia is a theatre complex located within the Perth Cultural Centre in Perth, Western Australia. The larger of three dedicated performance areas is known as the Heath Ledger Theatre in honour of Perth-born film actor Heath Ledger.

== Design and construction ==
After an international design competition in 2005, attracting more than 40 designs worldwide, was won by Kerry Hill Architects, construction on the Theatre Centre began in late 2007.

In July 2008 the Western Australian government announced that the complex would be named after Heath Ledger, however after a change of government, that decision was modified in December 2008 to apply only to the main auditorium.

The centre was officially opened on 27 January 2011.

== Facilities ==
The largest of three dedicated performance areas is the 575-seat Heath Ledger Theatre, named in honor of the late Academy Award winning actor, Heath Ledger. It is a traditional proscenium theatre. The stage can be modified to accommodate an orchestral pit. All the rows of seats are curved to face the stage and each row is elevated above the row in front, so that the occupant of every seat in the house can have an unobstructed view of the stage. There are timber acoustic baffles below the ceiling which enhance the acoustic qualities of the auditorium and the walls of the auditorium are lined with attractive timber panels.

The 234-seat "Studio Underground" is a black box theatre. The "Courtyard" is an outdoor area that can be configured to seat up to 200 people.

Although there is an inconspicuous lift, the main entry to the first floor foyer of the theatre is by a staircase over which hang spectacular decorative elements. The foyer is timber paneled like the auditorium.

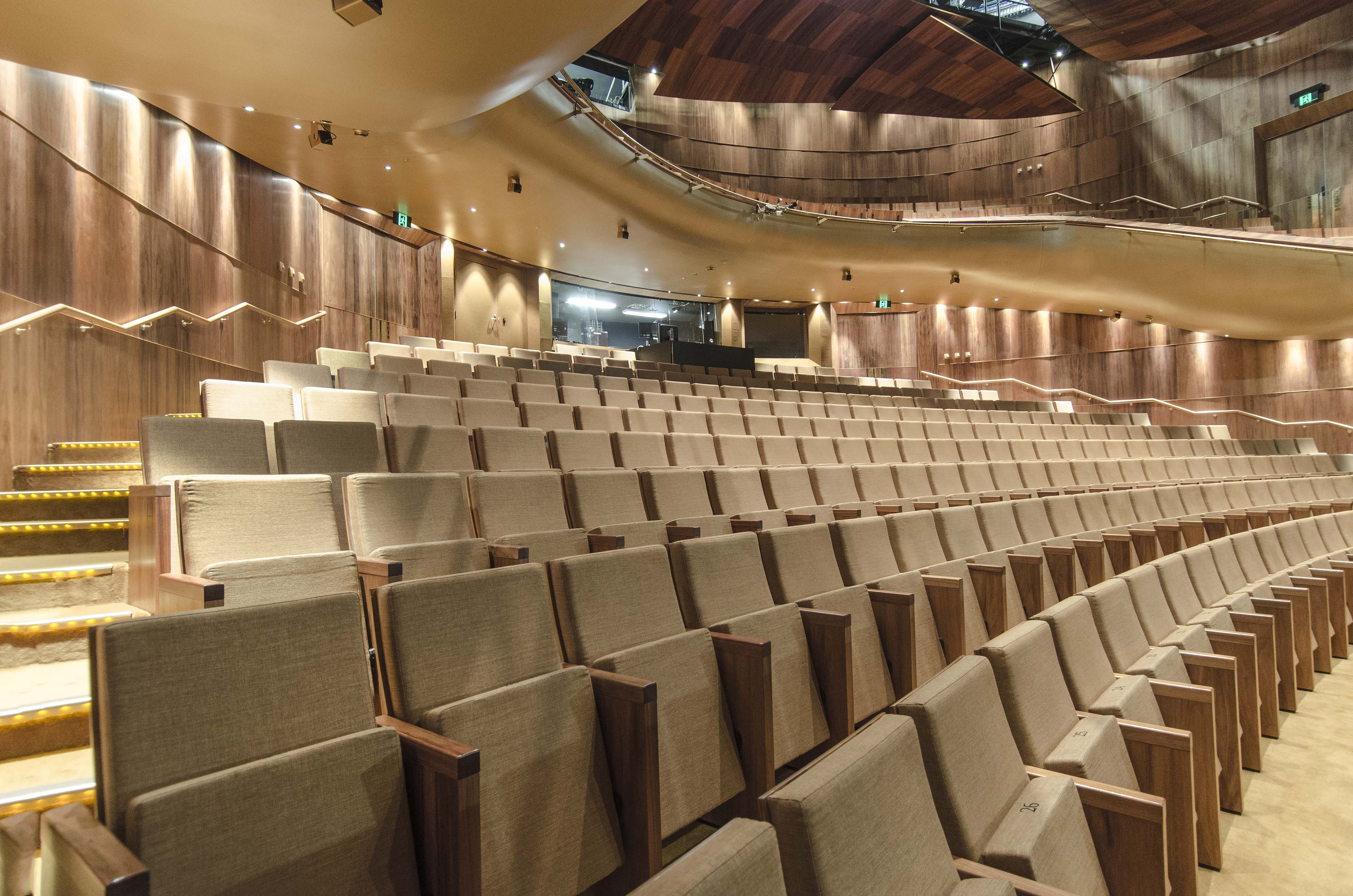
Auditorium 1 of the State Theatre Centre - Heath Ledger Theatre

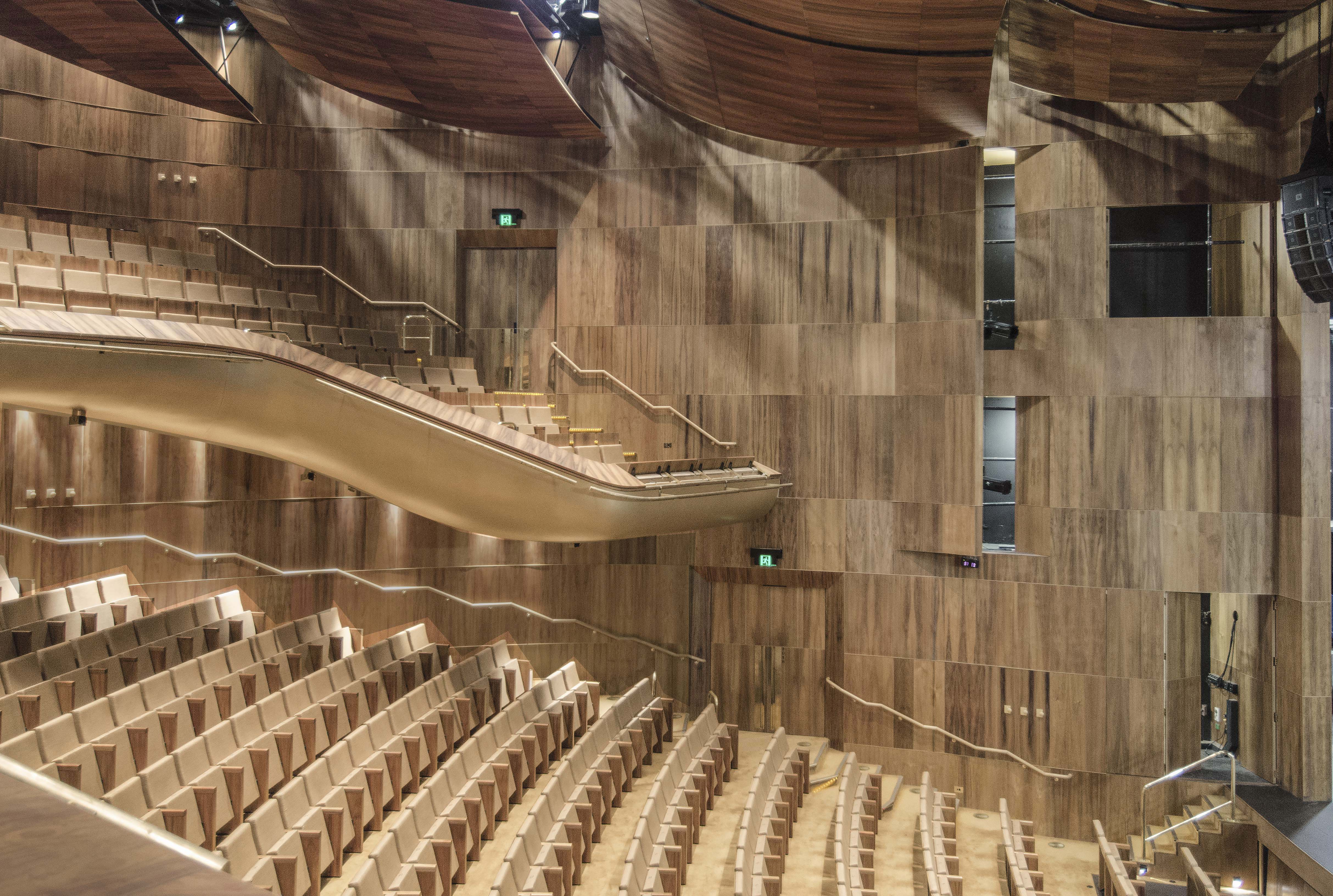
Auditorium 2 State Theatre Centre - Heath Ledger Theatre

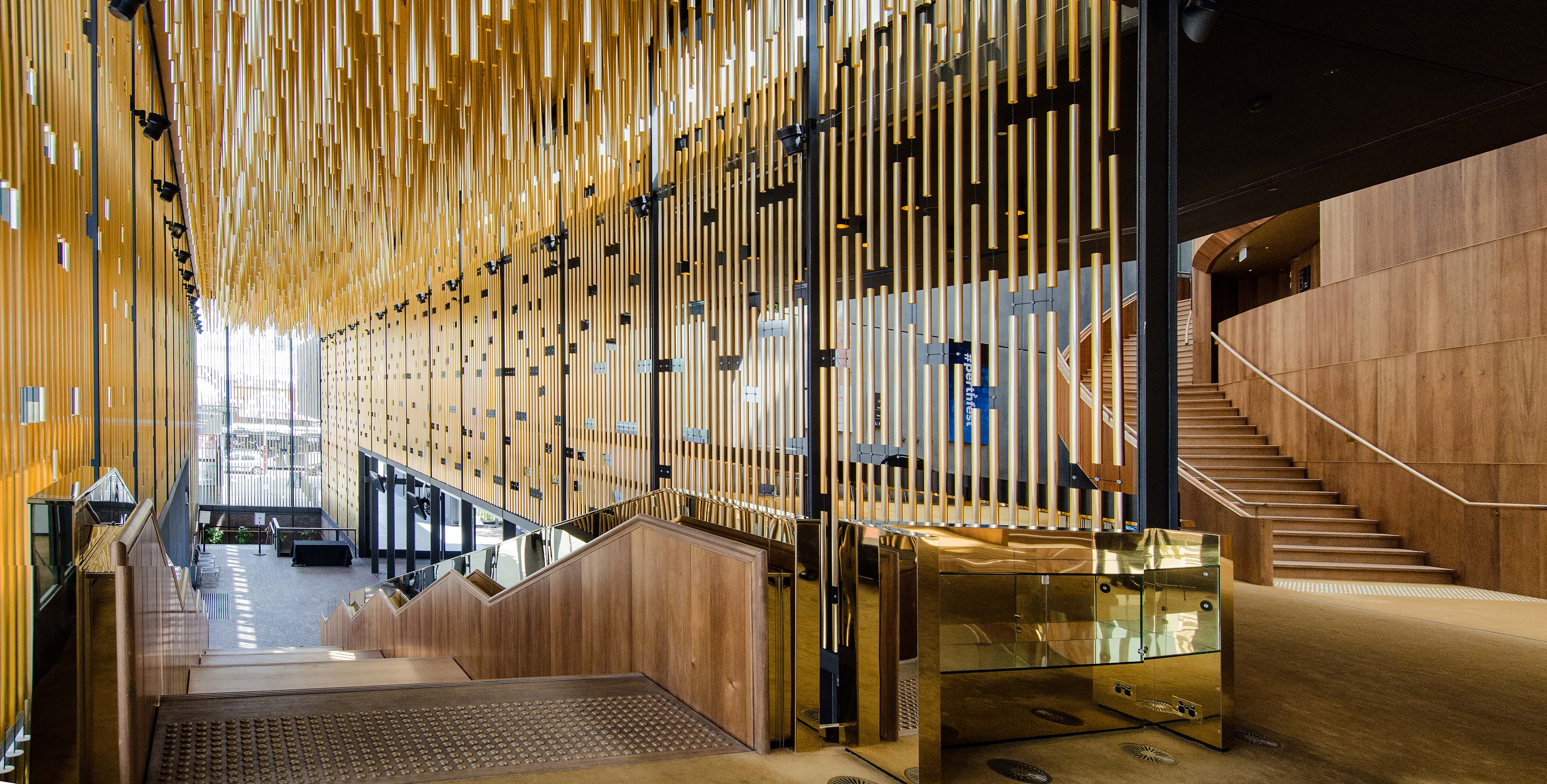
Upstairs foyer of the State Theatre of Western Australia

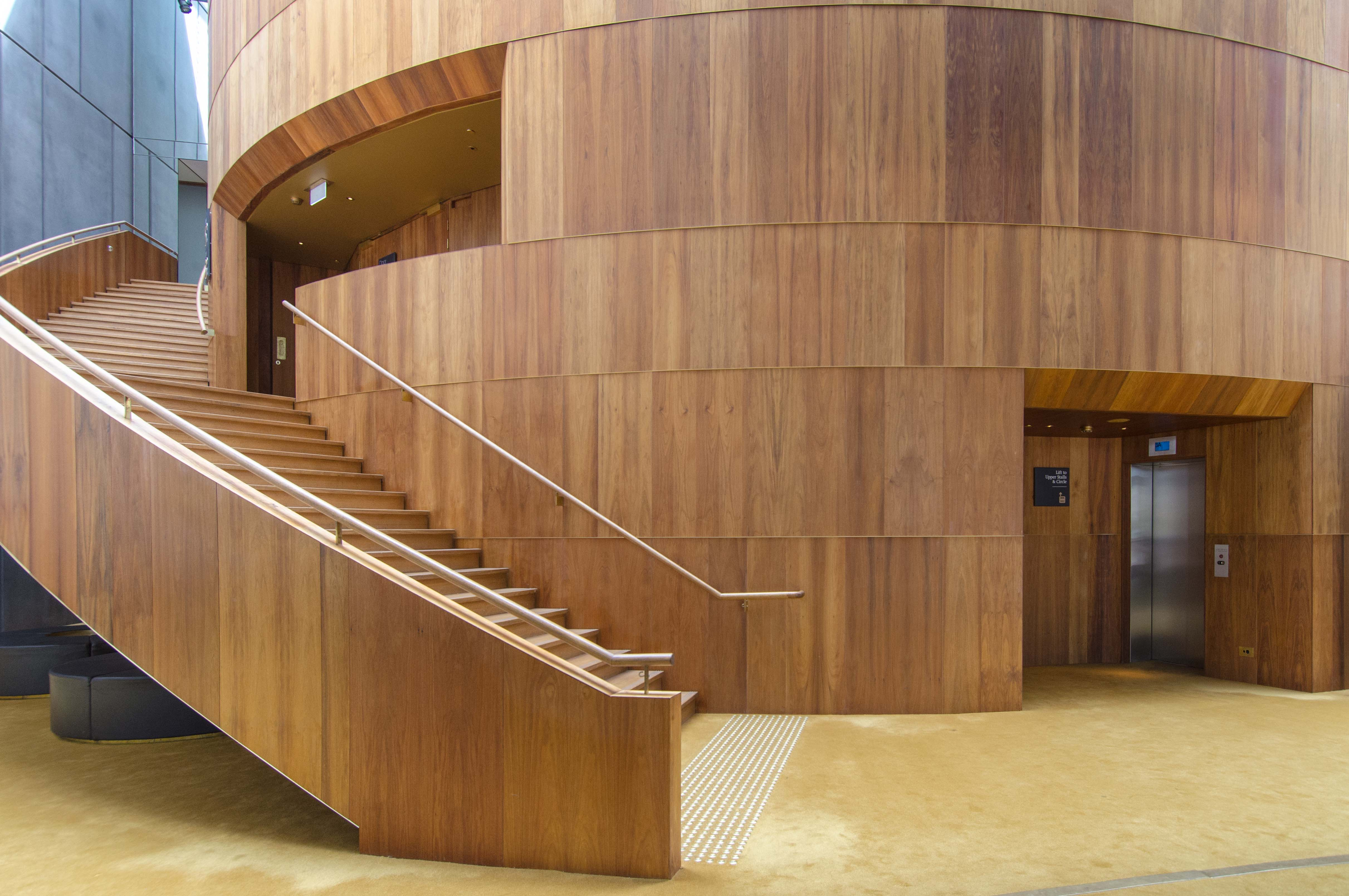
Foyer of the State Theatre of Western Australia

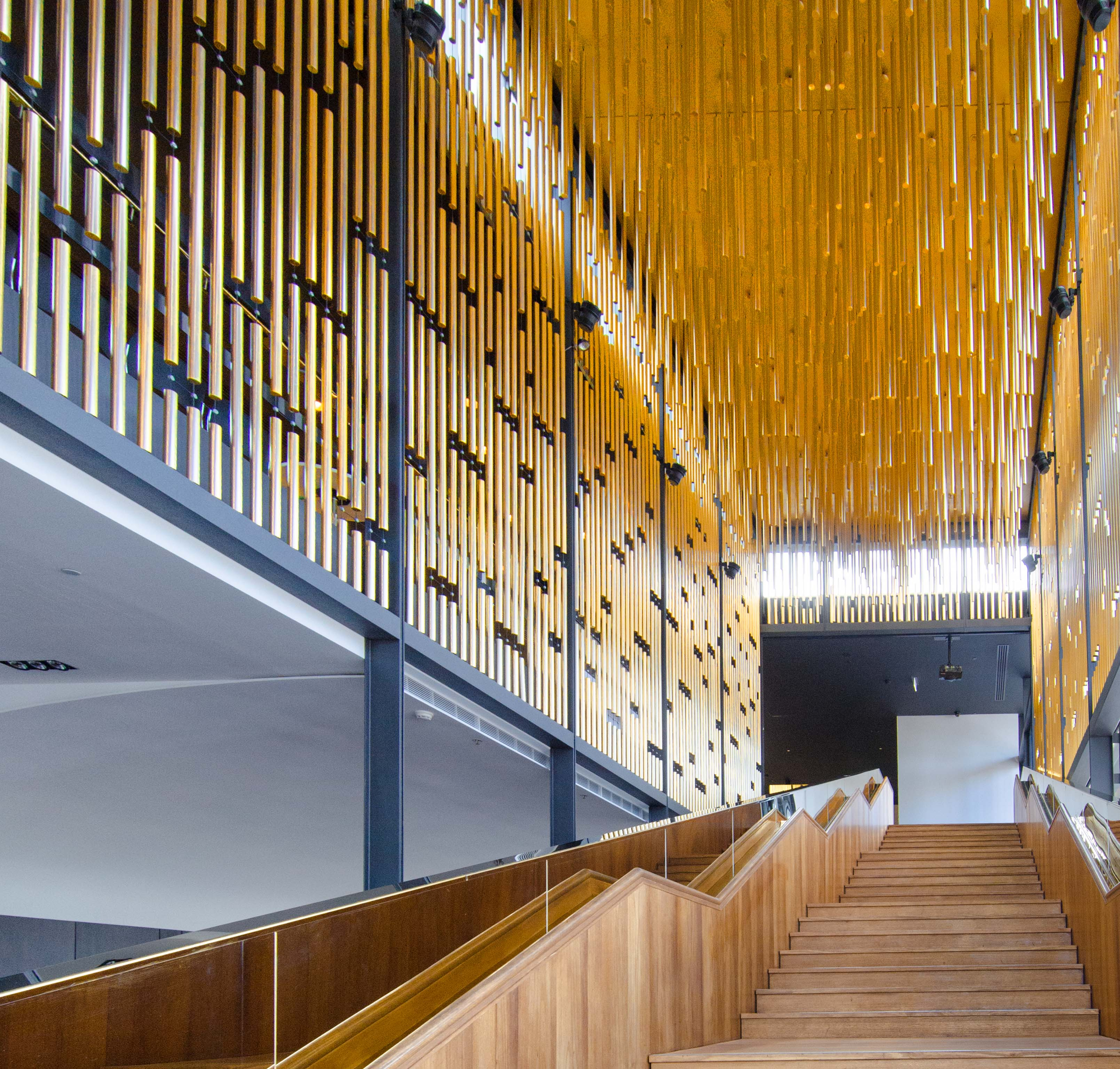
Entry staircase of the State Theatre of Western Australia
