= Miss Universe Malaysia 2004 =

Beauty pageant edition

- Date: 16 April 2004
- Venue: Kuala Lumpur
- Broadcaster: Astro Hitz
- Entrants: 13
- Placements: 8
- Winner: Andrea Fonseka; Penang
- Congeniality: Estelle Looi (Penang)

Miss Malaysia Universe 2004, the 38th edition of the Miss Universe Malaysia, was held on 16 April 2004 at Kuala Lumpur. Andrea Fonseka of Penang was crowned by the outgoing titleholder, Elaine Daly of Kuala Lumpur at the end of the event. She then represented Malaysia at the Miss Universe 2004 pageant in Quito, Ecuador.
