= Charmaine Chew =

Malaysian model and social influencer

- 赵奇恩
- Born: Charmaine Chew Qi En; 1996 (age 29–30); Alor Setar, Kedah, Malaysia
- Education: Taylor's University
- Occupations: Beauty pageant titleholder; social media influencer; model; emcee; student
- Height: 1.72 m (5 ft 8 in)
- Beauty pageant titleholder
- Title: Miss International Malaysia 2019
- Agency: Gatherum Management
- Years active: 2018–present
- Hair color: Black
- Eye color: Brown
- Major competitions: Miss Universe Malaysia 2018 (Top 10); Miss International Malaysia 2019 (Appointed); Miss International 2019 (Unplaced)

Charmaine Chew (born 1996) is a Malaysian beauty pageant titleholder, social media influencer, model and emcee who was crowned Miss International Malaysia 2019.

== Personal life ==
Chew hails from Alor Setar, the state capital of Kedah. She is pursuing a degree in public relations and mass communication at Taylor's University Lakeside Campus. She is a gamer and avid Muay Thai fan.

In 2018, she was invited to speak at TEDxYouth at Sri KDU International School in Petaling Jaya, Selangor. In November 2019, she is selected to be the International Grand Symposium Speaker at the International Model United Nations Malaysia 2019 in Taylor's University, Subang Jaya, Selangor.

== Pageantry ==
=== Miss Universe Malaysia 2018 ===
Chew competed in her first beauty pageant, Miss Universe Malaysia 2018 when she was twenty-one years old. She was the top 10 finalist of Miss Universe Malaysia 2018 and awarded the subsidiary title Miss Miko Galere.

=== Miss International Malaysia 2019 ===
In October 2019, Chew was appointed as Miss International Malaysia 2019 by the official licensee, Miss International Malaysia. She was selected from a list of suggestions by local pageant fans.

=== Miss International 2019 ===
As Miss International Malaysia 2019, Chew represented Malaysia at the Miss International 2019 competition in Tokyo, Japan on 12 November 2019, where Sireethorn Leearamwat of Thailand emerged as the eventual winner.

Awards and achievements
Preceded by Mandy Loo	Miss International Malaysia; 2019	Succeeded by TBA
