= Shweta Sekhon =

Malaysian model and beauty queen

- Born: Shwetajeet Kaur Sekhon; 6 November 1997 (age 28); Kuala Lumpur, Malaysia
- Education: HELP University
- Occupation: Model
- Height: 1.72 m (5 ft 8 in)
- Beauty pageant titleholder
- Title: Miss World Malaysia 2016; Miss Universe Malaysia 2019
- Hair colour: Black
- Eye colour: Black
- Major competitions: Miss World Malaysia 2016 (2nd Runner-up/Winner); Miss Universe Malaysia 2019 (Winner); Miss Universe 2019 (Unplaced)

Shweta Sekhon (born Shwetajeet Kaur Sekhon, 6 November 1997), is a Malaysian model and beauty pageant titleholder. She was crowned as Miss World Malaysia 2016 and Miss Universe Malaysia 2019. She represented Malaysia at the Miss Universe 2019 pageant in Atlanta, United States.

== Background ==
Shweta was born and raised in Kuala Lumpur, Malaysia of a local Malaysian Indian of ethnic Punjabi descent. She was named after Bollywood actor Amitabh Bachchan's eldest daughter, Shweta Nanda. She was raised by a single mum, a former Malaysia Airlines stewardess, together with her older sister Sabrina. She completed her form six studies at SMK Cochrane, Kuala Lumpur. She is fluent in English, Malay, Punjabi, and Hindi. She also decided to take a break from pursuing her tertiary education to focus on beauty pageants.

== Pageantry ==
Miss Malaysia World 2016

Shweta was scouted online for Miss World Malaysia 2016 pageant and chosen as the official Top 18 of the pageant. At the end of the pageant, she was initially placed as the second runner-up. In September 2016, she was elevated to first runner-up when Ranmeet Jassal gave up her first runner-up title. Six months after the pageant finals, she assumed the Miss Malaysia World 2016 title replacing the winner Tatiana Kumar, who was stripped off title due to "breach of conduct". She was the first in the history of beauty pageants in Malaysia to receive an unprecedented double promotion. Unfortunately, she did not compete in the Miss World 2017 pageant due to conflict in the organization.

Miss Universe Malaysia 2019

Shweta auditioned for the Miss Universe Malaysia 2019 and was chosen as the official Top 18. She was crowned as Miss Universe Malaysia 2019 as well as received subsidiary title, Miss Glojas Beauty by her predecessor, Jane Teoh in the final competition at The Majestic Hotel, Kuala Lumpur on 7 March 2019.

Miss Universe 2019

Shweta represented Malaysia at Miss Universe 2019 pageant which was held on 8 December 2019 in Atlanta, Georgia, United States but was unplaced. An unfortunate incorrect announcement was made during the national costume winner announcement.

=== Advocacy ===
Shweta launched a campaign, #YourBodyYourSay as her Miss Universe Malaysia advocacy campaign in August 2019. She hopes to build a much more positive society who is not fearful of accepting their true and real, authentic self. As part of the campaign, she conducted sharing sessions at universities such as HELP University and MAHSA University. The session at MAHSA University was featured in webisode, "Love, Shweta" that was released in October 2019.

== Modelling career ==
=== 2019 – 2020 ===
In July 2019, Shweta graced the cover for "Bela", "KL Lifestyle", and AEON Malaysia's Pearl magazine. She was also featured in the pages of fashion magazines, "Remaja" and "Majalah Nona". She also walked for Kedah Fashion Week held at Aman Central Mall in Alor Setar. In August, she walked for Kuala Lumpur Fashion Week in Alia Bustaman.

In February 2020, Shweta graces the cover of FEMALE magazine.

== Filmography ==
=== Film ===
Year	Title	Role	Notes
2024	Rubenin Jaanu		
2025	Keluang Man	Doctor Malini	

=== Television series ===
Year	Title	Role	TV Network
2023	Rajuk Katrina	Jasmine	TV3
2024	X-Change	Detective Divia	Astro Premier

=== Television ===
Year	Title	Role	TV Network
2020	MeleTOP	Guest host	Astro Ria

== Awards and recognition ==
- Special Awards at "Konsert Throwbaek 2019" by Astro – Malaysian Sweetheart

Awards and achievements
Preceded by (Sabah) Brynn Zalina Lovett	Miss World Malaysia; 2016	Succeeded by (Sarawak) Larissa Ping Liew
Preceded by (Penang) Jane Teoh	Miss Universe Malaysia; 2019	Succeeded by (Sarawak) Francisca James
