= Tatiana Kumar =

Malaysian model (born 1998)

- Born: Tatiana Nandha Kumar; 9 April 1998 (age 28); Bandar Tun Razak, Kuala Lumpur, Malaysia
- Height: 1.76 m (5 ft 9 1/2 in)
- Beauty pageant titleholder
- Title: Miss World Malaysia 2016
- Hair colour: Brown
- Eye colour: Black
- Major competitions: Miss World Malaysia 2016 (Winner; dethroned); Miss World 2016 (Unplaced)

Tatiana Kumar (born 9 April 1998) is a Malaysian model and beauty pageant titleholder. She was crowned Miss World Malaysia 2016, and was selected to represent Malaysia at Miss World 2016.

== Background ==
Tatiana Kumar is the daughter of a French mother and a Malaysian Indian father. She attended the French School of Kuala Lumpur.

== Pageantry ==
Tatiana was crowned Miss World Malaysia 2016 in Kuala Lumpur on 27 August 2016. She represented Malaysia at Miss World 2016 held at the Washington D.C., United States on 18 December 2016.

However, after a few months in March 2017, she was stripped off her title, as Miss Malaysia World committee stated that it was due to her "offensive" posting online, as well as for breaching conduct and contract terms, without further explanation. In December 2018, Tatiana finally break the news and she explained the real reason behind her dethronement. It was due to she declined to do a lingerie photoshoot.

Awards and achievements
| Preceded by Brynn Zalina Lovett | Miss Malaysia World; 2016 | Succeeded by Larissa Ping |
