= Miss Universe Malaysia 2019 =

- Date: March 7, 2019
- Presenters: Hansen Lee; Andrea Fonseka
- Entertainment: Dato' Sheila Majid; Yazmin Aziz; Aqeesh; Rainky Wai; ISE; Jason Leong
- Venue: Majestic Araneta Auditorium, Kuala Lumpur
- Broadcaster: hurr.tv
- Entrants: 18
- Placements: 10
- Winner: Shweta Sekhon; Kuala Lumpur
- Congeniality: Jean Kueh; Selangor

Miss Universe Malaysia 2019, the 53rd edition of the Miss Universe Malaysia, was held on 7 March 2019 at the Majestic Araneta Auditorium, Kuala Lumpur. Shweta Sekhon of Kuala Lumpur was crowned by the outgoing titleholder, Jane Teoh of Penang at the end of the event. She then represented Malaysia at the Miss Universe 2019 pageant in Atlanta, United States.

== Results ==
Final Results	Contestants
Miss Universe Malaysia 2019	Kuala Lumpur – Shweta Sekhon
1st Runner–Up	Johor – Frost Yaw
2nd Runner–Up	Selangor – Tessminderjit Kaur
3rd Runner–Up	Kuala Lumpur – Su Lee
Top 10	Kedah – Thunisah Devi; Kuala Lumpur – Christine Chai; Malacca – Nikita Menon; Perak – Rishon Shun; Selangor – Rabecca Tan; Selangor – Tanushia Devi

=== Gala Night Judges ===
- Alia Bastamam - Fashion designer and creative director
- Dato' Dr. JasG - Glojas Smart International Aesthetic CEO and founder
- Kiran Jassal - Miss Universe Malaysia 2016
- Lynn Lim - Actress
- Miko Au - Miko Galere celebrity hairstylist
- Dr. Nicholas Lim - La Jung Clinic Medical Director
- TJ Chan - Malaysia Airlines Berhad Head of Branding and Marketing Communications
- Whulandary Herman – Miss Universe Indonesia 2013

== Special awards ==
Awards	Contestants
Miss Congeniality	Selangor – Jean Kueh
Miss Miko Galére Exceptional Coiffure	Perak – Rebecca Chan
Miss Duchess & Co. Online Personality	Malacca – Nikita Menon
Miss Babel Body Beautiful	Selangor – Jean Kueh
Face of MUCA	Johor – Frost Yaw
Miss Dentist Winning Smile	Kuala Lumpur – Christine Chai
Miss Glojas Glowing Beauty	Kuala Lumpur – Shweta Sekhon
Miss Auto Bavaria Elegance	Kuala Lumpur – Christine Chai
Miss Habib Jewels	Malacca – Nikita Menon

== Contestants ==
Official 18 finalists of Miss Universe Malaysia 2019.

=== Color Key ===
Declared as Winner
Ended as Top 4 Finalists
Ended as Top 10 Semifinalists
Eliminated or Quit

Contestant	Age	Height	Hometown	Occupation	Notes
Cassandra Devi Jeremiah	26	5 ft 9 in (1.75 m)	Sabah	Youth Development Executive	
Christine Chai Xin Tze	19	5 ft 8 in (1.73 m)	Kuala Lumpur	Mass Communication and Media Student	Top 10
Elaine Audrey Lee	27	5 ft 3 in (1.60 m)	Sabah	News Announcer	
Frost Yaw Hui Jing	25	5 ft 5 in (1.65 m)	Johor	Actress/ Model	1st Runner-up
Jean Kueh Yong Jun	26	5 ft 5 in (1.65 m)	Selangor	Psychology Graduate	
Michelle Jeyabalan	26	5 ft 5 in (1.65 m)	Kelantan	Public Relations and Marketing Graduate	
Naveesyaah Kumar	22	5 ft 7 in (1.70 m)	Selangor	Mass Communication Student	
Nikita Menon	23	5 ft 7 2/3 in (1.72 m)	Malacca	Economics and Finance Student	Top 10
Rabecca Tan Yee Ying	26	5 ft 8 1/2 in (1.74 m)	Selangor	Public Relations Intern	Top 10
Rebecca Chan Hui Ting	25	5 ft 9 in (1.75 m)	Perak	Sales and Procurement Executive	
Rishon Shun	25	5 ft 7 1/2 in (1.71 m)	Perak	English Teacher	Top 10
Saroopdeep Bath	21	5 ft 9 2/2 in (1.78 m)	Perak	Retail Associate/ Fashion Model	
Shwetajeet Kaur Sekhon	22	5 ft 7 1/2 in (1.71 m)	Kuala Lumpur	Freelance Fashion Model	Winner
Soniyah Kumaresan	26	5 ft 9 in (1.75 m)	Kuala Lumpur	Fashion Design Intern	
“Su Lee” Lee Su Hsien	25	5 ft 7 1/2 in (1.71 m)	Kuala Lumpur	Events Executive	3rd Runner-up
Tanushia Devi Paransothy	24	5 ft 11 in (1.80 m)	Selangor	Actuarial Executive	Top 10
Tessminderjit Kaur	23	5 ft 7 in (1.70 m)	Selangor	Biomedical Engineering (Prosthetics & Orthotics) Student	1st Runner-up
Thunisah Devi	24	5 ft 7 in (1.70 m)	Kedah	Pharmacy Graduate	Top 10

== Webisodes ==
The top 18 finalists were featured in an online show, “The Next Miss Universe Malaysia 2019” consisting of six episodes of their personal profiles, followed by 12 episodes of their journey leading to the crowning of Miss Universe Malaysia 2019.

== Crossovers ==
Contestants who previously competed/appeared at other international/national beauty pageants:

International Pageants

Supermodel International

- 2017: Su Lee Hsien (Top 10)

Miss Asia Pacific International

- 2016: Rishon Shun

Miss Tourism Queen International

- 2016 - Cassandra Jeremiah (Best National Costume)

National Pageants

Miss Grand Malaysia

- 2018 - Saroopdeep Bath (1st Runner-up)

Miss World Malaysia

- 2014 - Cassandra Jeremiah (2nd Runner-up)
- 2016 - Shweta Sekhon (2nd Runner-up, later Miss World Malaysia 2016)

Miss Global Intercontinental Malaysia

- 2016 - Cassandra Jeremiah (2nd Runner-up)

Miss Malaysia Tourism

- 2015 - Rishon Shun (Miss Malaysia Tourism Queen of the Year)

Miss Perak Tourism

- 2015 - Rishon Shun (Winner)

Supermodel International Malaysia

- 2017: Su Lee Hsien (Winner)
