= Choo Yilin =

Fine jewelry company from Singapore

- Industry: Jewellery
- Founded: 2009
- Founders: Choo Yilin
- Headquarters: Singapore
- Products: Jade Jewellery
- Website: https://chooyilin.com/

Choo Yilin is a Singapore-based fine jewelry company founded in 2009. It first became known for its modern take on traditional jade jewelry, and has subsequently also created jewelry using other gemstones such as spinels and pearls. In October 2019, the brand announced that it would be going on an indefinite hiatus.

== History ==
=== Establishment ===
The brand was created in 2009 by founder Choo Yilin, who created her eponymous brand with the intention of modernising jade jewelry. She has cited both the gemstone's cultural significance in Asia and the need to create a link between the traditional stone and the style of the modern day, because "the younger generation do not have that sort of emotional connection with [jade] because they always associate it with their grandmothers."

In addition, founder Choo Yilin has also expressed the desire to promote the appreciation of jade outside of Asia, by "creating jade pieces in such a way that it can connect deeply with a non-Chinese audience as well... to show the world that jade is beautiful beyond cultural borders."

=== Awards & Impact ===
In 2010, Choo Yilin was nominated for the Mort Abelson design award for jewelry, the first Asian designer to have done so. The brand was also named one of Singapore Tatler's 10 Best Singapore Jewellers in 2017, 2018, and 2019.

In 2018, Choo Yilin's pieces were worn by Singaporean actress Janice Koh to the LA premiere of the movie Crazy Rich Asians. A subsequent media campaign by the Singapore Tourism Board also featured the brand's jewelry.

Choo Yilin has also been commissioned by the Singapore Tourism Board and the Singapore Ministry of Foreign Affairs to design and produce jewelry pieces for prominent individuals such as Amanda Seyfried, Maria Sharapova, Serena Williams, and Sasha and Malia Obama.

=== Collaborations ===
Choo Yilin has created special jewelry collections in collaboration with YTL Hotels and Singapore Airlines.

=== International Reach ===
The brand has showcased its work at jewelry shows in London, New York and Paris.

In 2017, Choo Yilin was invited by the Singapore Tourism Board to be one of seven Singaporean designers to showcase their work at an exposition in New York City.

In September 2019, the brand announced plans to expand to other markets, including Malaysia and the United States.

=== Indefinite Closure ===
In October 2019, the brand announced that it would be taking an indefinite hiatus. Founder Yilin Choo has reportedly stated that the hiatus is not for financial reasons. Instead, the brand will "work on ‘laying the foundations for Choo Yilin v2.0, the next chapter of our journey of love, heritage, and becoming.’"

== Jewelry ==
=== Jade ===
Choo Yilin is primarily known for its jade jewellery. It uses Type A jadeite sourced from Myanmar that is custom-cut for the brand.

=== Designs ===
The brand's jewelry often uses traditional Peranakan motifs, which are of cultural significance to people in the Southeast Asia region. Other motifs include Asian botanicals such as bamboo and cherry blossom.

While it was still operational, Choo Yilin also offered bespoke services for its jewelry pieces, and is particularly well known for its customised Si Dian Jin, a set of four jewelry pieces that are an integral part of a Chinese bride's traditional wedding trousseau.
