= Miss World Malaysia 2016 =

- Date: 28 August 2016
- Venue: Corus Hotel, Kuala Lumpur
- Entrants: 20
- Placements: 5
- Winner: Shweta Sekhon (assumed); Tatiana Kumar (dethroned); Kuala Lumpur

Miss World Malaysia 2016, the 50th edition of the Miss World Malaysia pageant, was held at the Corus Hotel, Kuala Lumpur on August 28, 2016. Brynn Zalina Lovett of Sabah crowned her successor Tatiana Kumar from Kuala Lumpur at the end of the contest. Twenty contestants from all across Malaysia competed for the crown. Tatiana represented Malaysia at Miss World 2016.

== Contestants ==
20 contestants competed for the crown and title.

| Contestant | Represented | Age | Height | Placement | Ref |
|---|---|---|---|---|---|
| Janani Baskaran | Kuala Lumpur | 18 | 165 cm (5 ft 5 in) | | |
| Tan Hui Ling | Johor | 25 | 164 cm (5 ft 4 1/2 in) | | |
| Marissa Ong | Melaka | 17 | 167 cm (5 ft 5 1/2 in) | | |
| Jessica Lim | Selangor | 24 | 167 cm (5 ft 5 1/2 in) | 3rd Runner-Up | |
| Janice Tan | Labuan | 19 | 170 cm (5 ft 7 in) | | |
| Shweta Sekhon | Kuala Lumpur | 19 | 170 cm (5 ft 7 in) | 2nd Runner-Up | |
| Yuvin Loo Liu Yan | Penang | 19 | 170 cm (5 ft 7 in) | | |
| Ranmeet Jassal | Selangor | 24 | 173 cm (5 ft 8 in) | 1st Runner-Up (Note: First runner-up, Ranmeet Jassal relinquished her position and prizes due to being handpicked as Miss Grand Malaysia 2016. There were no official statement stated that the other runners-up moved up one position.) | |
| Tatiana Kumar | Kuala Lumpur | 18 | 176 cm (5 ft 9 1/2 in) | Winner | |
| Francisca Luhong James | Sarawak | 20 | 175 cm (5 ft 9 in) | 4th Runner-Up | |
| Ushaanthini Puttharasan | Penang | 23 | 175 cm (5 ft 9 in) | | |
| Amreet Kaur Sra | Perak | 20 | 175 cm (5 ft 9 in) | | |
| Chloe Wong | Sarawak | 25 | 171 cm (5 ft 7 1/2 in) | | |
| Adelina Chan | Penang | 23 | 168 cm (5 ft 6 in) | | |
| Joyce Khoo | Sarawak | 22 | 168 cm (5 ft 6 in) | | |
| Malathy Vadamalai | Kuala Lumpur | 21 | 167 cm (5 ft 5 1/2 in) | | |
| Paveetha Panir Selvam | Kuala Lumpur | 23 | 168 cm (5 ft 6 in) | | |
| Sally Lee Kah Ying | Melaka | 23 | 167 cm (5 ft 5 1/2 in) | | |
| Mary Jane Atkinson | Sarawak | 21 | 167 cm (5 ft 5 1/2 in) | | |
| Miffy Deyn | Johor | 25 | 165 cm (5 ft 5 in) | | |

== Crossovers ==
Contestants who previously competed/appeared at other national beauty pageants:

Miss Grand Malaysia

- 2016 - Ranmeet Jassal (Winner)

Miss Cultural Harvest Festival

- 2015 - Francisca Luhong James Bungan (2nd Runner-up)

Miss Earth Malaysia

- 2015 - Amreet Kaur Sra (1st Runner-up)

Miss Tourism Queen Malaysia

- 2015 - Amreet Kaur Sra (Winner)

Miss Tourism Queen International

- 2015 - Amreet Kaur Sra (Miss Elegance)
