= Richard Kirk Architect =

KIRK (founded as Richard Kirk Architect) is an Australian architectural practice established in Brisbane in 1995 by architect Richard Kirk. The practice maintains studios in Brisbane, Sydney and Kuala Lumpur, and works across education, cultural, residential and commercial architecture, with a focus on mass engineered timber construction.

The practice's built work includes the Advanced Engineering Building at the University of Queensland (2013), the Mon Repos Turtle Centre in Bundaberg (2019), and the Engineering and Innovation Place at James Cook University in Townsville (with i4 Architecture and Charles Wright Architects), which received the Daryl Jackson Award for Educational Architecture at the 2025 National Architecture Awards. Its Moffat Beach House, a cross-laminated timber residence on the Sunshine Coast, received a state award for residential architecture at the 2024 Queensland Architecture Awards.
