= Miss World Malaysia 2018 =

- Date: 8 September 2018
- Entertainment: Imran Ajmain; Dewi Liana Seriestha
- Venue: Borneo Convention Centre Kuching, Sarawak
- Director: Dr. Sean Wong
- Producer: Creative Teamlab Sdn. Bhd.
- Entrants: 12
- Placements: 5
- Winner: Larissa Ping Liew; Sarawak

Miss World Malaysia 2018, the 51st edition of the Miss World Malaysia pageant, was held at the Borneo Convention Centre Kuching in Sarawak on 8 September 2018.

Present were Sarawak Chief Minister, Datuk Patinggi Abang Johari Tun Openg and his wife Datin Patinggi Juma'ani Tuanku Bujang as well as Toh Puan Raghad Kurdi Taib, the wife of the Yang di-Pertua Negeri of Sarawak and Datuk Haji Abdul Karim Rahman Hamzah, Minister of Tourism, Arts, Culture, Youth and Sports. The winner received a crown worth RM4 million, RM30,000 cash and RM30,000 worth of prizes. The event itself was supported by the Ministry of Tourism Sarawak.

12 contestants competed in the grand finale. Sarawakian lass Larissa Ping was crowned Miss World Malaysia 2018. She was crowned by Malaysian actresses, Nabila Huda and Carmen Soo. She then represented Malaysia at Miss World 2018 in Sanya, China where she placed in the Top 30.

== Contestants ==
12 contestants competed for the crown and title.

No.	Contestant	Age	Height	Placement
01	Larissa Ping Liew	19	1.72 m (5 ft 7 1/2 in)	Miss World Malaysia 2018
02	Esther Chew Yen Qi	24	1.66 m (5 ft 5 1/2 in)	
03	Noel Mun Yi	22	1.68 m (5 ft 6 in)	
04	Dhurghesswary Uthawaraj	20	1.72 m (5 ft 7 1/2 in)	
05	Zane Wong	22	1.70 m (5 ft 7 in)	
06	Emily Ng Nee	24	1.70 m (5 ft 7 in)	
07	Shannen Jade Totten	24	1.71 m (5 ft 7 1/2 in)	1st Princess
08	Amanda Andrea Koh	26	1.63 m (5 ft 4 in)	
09	Kathleen Wong	24	1.75 m (5 ft 9 in)	Top 5
10	Naomi Sim En Yi	26	1.78 m (5 ft 10 in)	2nd Princess
11	Francisca Luhong James	22	1.75 m (5 ft 9 in)	Top 5
12	Loh Shi Min	22	1.68 m (5 ft 6 in)	

== Judges ==
The following served as judges on the coronation night of Miss World Malaysia 2018:

- Amber Chia – Actress, Model, TV Host
- Carmen Soo – Actress, Model
- Dewi Liana Seriestha – Miss World Malaysia 2014
- Nabila Huda – Actress, TV Host, Emcee
- Sapphire Wong – Miss Cheongsam Sarawak 2016
- Tong Bing Yu – Artist
