= Miss Universe Malaysia =

Malaysian beauty pageant

- Formation: 1962; 64 years ago
- Type: NGO
- Headquarters: Kuala Lumpur
- Location: Malaysia
- Official language: English
- Owner: Miss Grand International Public Company Limited
- President & National Director: Ayu Omar
- Key people: Nawat Itsaragrisil
- Affiliations: Miss Universe
- Website: mumo.com.my

Miss Universe Malaysia is an annual national beauty pageant and an organization that selects Malaysia's representative to the annual Miss Universe contest. On occasion, when the winner does not qualify (due to age or any other reason), a runner-up is sent.

The current Miss Universe Malaysia is Sandra Lim of Selangor. She won on 6 September 2024 and represented her country at Miss Universe 2024 where she finished in the top 30.

== History ==
The competition was first held in 1964 as "Miss Malaysia" until 1969 and "Miss Malaysia Universe" from 1970 until 2009. Also "Miss Malaya" in 1962 and 1963. No national competition were held in 1968, 2011 and 2021. The pageant was founded in 1962 by Mr. Jaycee Liu Chang Lan who then became the pageant's first national director. The first franchisee with the Miss Universe Organization was the Petaling Jaya Rotary Club. The pageant was registered under Beyond Entity Sdn. Bhd. in 2009 and MYEG Services Berhad as the franchise holder until 2022.

Malaya was first invited to compete in Miss Universe 1954 but due to lack of support from the Malayan government, the winner was competed as Miss Singapore instead. In 1964, the first Miss Universe Malaysia pageant was held at Stadium Merdeka, Kuala Lumpur and has been organized annually since 1969. More than eight thousands spectators were in the stadium to witnessed the first ever Miss Universe Malaysia contest. The contest was then won by Angela Filmer from Selangor where she had the rights to represent Malaysia in Miss Universe 1964 pageant in Miami, Florida, United States thus making her the second woman from Malaysia to ever compete in Miss Universe stage after Sarah Alhabshee Abdullah in 1962. However, at the time, Malaysia had not yet been formed. Malaysia was also once withdrawn in Miss Universe 1963.

The pageant was first televised in the 1970s. From 2010 to 2017, the pageant was broadcast on Diva and 8TV. From 2017 to 2019, the pageant was broadcast on hurr.tv, which also then became the official online channel. The current official media partner for Miss Universe Malaysia is The Star, an English-language daily newspaper since 2003 until now.

On 11 May 1995, the Government of Selangor issued a fatwa in prohibiting every Muslim woman in Malaysia from joining and competing in any national pageant that sends the winner to an international pageant such as Miss Universe. The fatwa regarding the banning of Muslim women in participating in beauty pageants was finalized through the government gazette on 8 February 1996. The fatwa has been recently issued in Penang on 11 May 2017.

=== 2010–2019 ===
In 2010, the Miss Malaysia Universe was restyled by then national director, Andrea Fonseka, a former Miss Malaysia Universe 2004. The pageant organisation changed its name to Miss Universe Malaysia Organization, and moved its headquarters from Kuala Lumpur to the MYEG Services Berhad Malaysia building, Petaling Jaya, Selangor. On 3 November 2012, Fonseka stepped down as national director and the position was given to then Miss Malaysia Universe 2003, Elaine Daly. Daly held the position for a year before it was given to Carey Ng, a former Miss Universe Malaysia 2013. The first pageant production under Carey Ng's auspices was in 2014. On 3 February 2016, she resigned shortly after the Miss Universe Malaysia 2016 competition due to several controversies and again, was replaced by Daly who has held the position of national director since the resignation of Carey Ng.

=== 2020–2021 ===
Since the pageant's inception in 1964, the country had only one international place, at 1970 with Josephine Lena Wong. At Miss Universe Malaysia 2020, Francisca Luhong James was unplaced at Miss Universe 2020. As of 2023, Malaysia currently holds the longest streaks of unplaced contestants in Miss Universe beauty pageant for 52 years since their last placement in 1970.

In 2021, the Miss Universe Malaysia Organization withdrew from Miss Universe 2021 in Eilat, Israel due to travel restrictions associated with the COVID-19 pandemic. This was the second time the country did not since Miss Universe 1962.

=== Miss Universe Malaysia 2022 controversy ===
Miss Universe Malaysia 2022, Lesley Cheam' position was called into question by beauty pageant fans across the country due to controversy over a dildo. The finale was held privately with no live telecast, which raised doubts among the pageant fans. Fans petitioned for first runner-up Ajunee Kaur, to represent Malaysia at Miss Universe 2022. The Miss Universe Malaysia organization did not reply regarding this.

=== 2023–present ===
On 8 February 2023, a new Miss Universe Malaysia organization was formed under the same ownership with Miss Universe Indonesia. The license was co-owned by an Indonesian artist, Datin Wira Poppy Capella Swastika, which was also the national director of the pageant under Just Capella Sdn. Bhd. management. The pageant press launch was held at the St. Regis Hotel, Kuala Lumpur on 17 February 2023. Present were the Miss Universe and Miss Universe Malaysia team, Miss Universe 2022, R'Bonney Gabriel, second runner-up and top five of Miss Universe 2022, Andreína Martínez and Gabriëla Dos Santos, respectively.

On 12 August 2023, the Miss Universe Organization (MUO) cancelled Miss Universe Malaysia 2023 over the controversy iover Miss Universe Indonesia. MUO terminated their franchise contract with the owner and national director for both Miss Universe Malaysia and Indonesia, Datin Wira Poppy Capella.

On 21 June 2024,a new national director was announced for Miss Universe Malaysia organization, Malaysian model and former beauty queen Eleen Yong.

== Competition ==
In 1962, Malaya debut at Miss Universe. Since the formation of Malaysia on 16 September 1963, the Malayan candidates began to compete as Miss Malaysia. The modern pageant is attended by participants from various city from the thirteen states and three federal territories (Kuala Lumpur and Selangor are usually represented by more than one participant), for a total of 18 to 20 participants.

=== State competitions ===
Since 1963, each state holds a regional competition to choose their delegate for the Miss Universe Malaysia pageant. The state winners hold the title "Miss (State) Universe" for the year of their reign. The state pageants were discontinued since then. These were the following regional competition that sent their delegate to Miss Universe Malaysia pageant:

- Miss Johore Universe
- Miss Kedah Universe / Miss Kedah-Perlis Universe
- Miss Kelantan Universe
- Miss Kuala Lumpur
- Miss Malacca
- Miss Negri Sembilan Universe
- Miss Pahang Universe
- Miss Penang Universe
- Miss Perak Universe
- Miss Perlis Universe / Miss Kedah-Perlis Universe
- Miss Sabah
- Miss Sarawak
- Miss Selangor Universe
- Miss Singapore Universe
- Miss Trengganu Universe

The most successful state is Selangor, which has had the most semi-finalists and runner-ups including ten winners. Other successful states include Kuala Lumpur, Perak, Sarawak, Penang, and Sabah. The least successful states are Putrajaya, placing only once in the history of the pageant; Labuan, which has only placed twice; and Negeri Sembilan, which gained its only crown in 2015. The states that has not (yet) win any crown were Labuan and Perlis.

=== Editions ===
Year	Date	Venue of Competition	Host State	Entrants
2026				
2025	12 September	Majestic Ballroom, The Majestic Hotel Kuala Lumpur	Kuala Lumpur	16
2024	6 September	The Majestic Hotel, Tasik Perdana	Kuala Lumpur	16
2023	27 August	Private Event		6
2022	7 October	M Resort and Hotel, Damansara	Kuala Lumpur	15
2020	5 September	Kota Damansara, Petaling Jaya	Selangor	18
2019	7 March	Majestic Araneta Auditorium, The Majestic Hotel	Kuala Lumpur	18
2018	11 January	Majestic Araneta Auditorium, The Majestic Hotel	Kuala Lumpur	18
2017	23 February	Majestic Araneta Auditorium, The Majestic Hotel	Kuala Lumpur	17
2016	30 April	Palace of the Golden Horses Hotel, Seri Kembangan	Selangor	14
2015	17 April	Shangri-La Hotel, Jalan Sultan Ismail	Kuala Lumpur	17
2014	19 December 2013	Setia City Convention Centre, Shah Alam	Selangor	19
2013	10 December 2012	Setia City Convention Centre, Shah Alam	Selangor	17
2012	10 November 2011	Sunway Pyramid Convention Centre, Shah Alam	Selangor	19
2011	11 January	Smoke and Fire Variety Club, Gardens Mall	Kuala Lumpur	10
2010	16 May	Royale Chulan Hotel, Jalan Conlay	Kuala Lumpur	18
2009	30 May	Royale Chulan Hotel, Jalan Conlay	Kuala Lumpur	18
2008	30 May	St. Giles Gardens Hotel, Mid Valley City	Kuala Lumpur	13
2007	21 April	The Mines Resort, Seri Kembangan	Selangor	16
2006	19 April	Royale Chulan Hotel, Jalan Conlay	Kuala Lumpur	13
2005	30 April	Royale Chulan Hotel, Jalan Conlay	Kuala Lumpur	13
2004	16 April	Royale Chulan Hotel, Jalan Conlay	Kuala Lumpur	13
2003	11 April	Hotel Istana, Bukit Bintang	Kuala Lumpur	16
1990	23 April	Genting Highlands, Bentong	Pahang	15
1989	19 March	Hyatt Saujana Hotel, Shah Alam	Selangor	16
1979	28 April	Merlin Hotel, Jalan Sultan Ismail	Kuala Lumpur	21
1978	18 May	Merlin Hotel, Lebuh Penang, George Town	Penang	17
1977	30 April	Federal Hotel, Bukit Bintang	Kuala Lumpur	14
1973	10 June	Merlin Hotel, Jalan Sultan Ismail	Kuala Lumpur	13
1971	12 June	Merlin Hotel, Jalan Sultan Ismail	Kuala Lumpur	13
1970	29 May	Fortuna Hotel, Bukit Bintang	Kuala Lumpur	13
1969	23 June	Johor Diamond Jubilee Hall, Grand Mutiara Hotel	Johor	11
1967	30 June	Asrama Perak, Tambun, Ipoh	Perak	10
1965	12 June	Stadium Merdeka, City Centre	Kuala Lumpur	14
1964	13 June	Stadium Merdeka, City Centre	Kuala Lumpur	14

== Winners ==
The oldest woman to win, was Miss Universe Malaysia 2011, Deborah Henry of Kuala Lumpur, at 26 years old. Maznah Ali, of Johor, the first runner-up in Miss Malaysia 1967 and the titleholder of Miss Malaysia 1968 was the first to compete in two international pageants on the same year: Miss Universe and Miss International. The tallest Miss Universe Malaysia is Miss Universe Malaysia 2004, Andrea Fonseka, of Penang at 6 feet and 0 inch (183 cm).

The first Malay winner to win the title was Nik Azizah Nik Yahya of Kelantan in 1963; the first Eurasian winner was Angela Filmer of Selangor in 1964; the first Hispanic winner was Patricia Augustus of Penang in 1965; the first Chinese winner was Helen Lee of Perak in 1966; the first Siamese winner was Monkam Siprasome of Kedah in 1967; the first Caucasian winner was Yvette Batterman of Selangor in 1971; the first Indian winner was Lucy Narayanasamy of Selangor in 1993; and the first Indigenous winner was Francisca Luhong James of Sarawak in 2020.

== Crowns of Miss Universe Malaysia ==
The crown of Miss Universe Malaysia has changed numerous times since 1964.

- Rafflesia Tiara (2013) – The tiara consists of 229 freshwater pearls, six blue sapphires, diamonds and adorned with white gold and designed in floral motif priced at RM500,000 (US$121 thousand), was designed by its director Winnie Sin. The crown was a reflection of Rafflesia The Pearl Centre's 10th anniversary in the entertainment and jewellery making business.
- Aquamarine Crown (2016–2018) – Created by Ceres Jewels, this crown drawn inspiration from the roaring ocean waves, the fascinating shades and colors of the ocean water, these elements embodied a woman with nature's wonder. The crown estimated to be worth US$1.3 million. The whole production process, from the first sketches to the production itself, took about six months.
- Reflection Crown (2019–2022) – Created by Habib Jewels, the crown features a 10-carat diamond set in white gold and was conceptualized to represent strength, power, courage, creativity, self-respect and love. The crown was named such as it resonates with the values and beauty reflected in each finalist. The crown is valued at RM2.38 million (US$580 thousand).
- Women Empowerment Tiara (2024) – The tiara made by J & Kel'l Creation consists of 18k white gold base, 70 carats of diamonds, jade central stone, and Tsavorite accents. Being a symbol of strength, beauty, and achievements of women worldwide.
- Eternal Blossom (2025-present) - Created by A Vintage Collezione, the crown captures the moment when a woman embraces her strength and individuality. The crown is made out of 18K white gold and 16.39 carats of natural diamonds. The crown is valued at USD50,000 (approximately RM211,000).

== Recent titleholders ==
Year	Candidate	State	Placement & Performance	
Year	Candidate	State	Placements	Special award(s)
2026				
2025	Chloe Lim	Kuala Lumpur	Unplaced	
2024	Sandra Lim	Selangor	Top 30	
2023	Serena Lee	Kuala Lumpur	Unplaced	

== See also ==
- Miss Universe
