= Cultural depictions of Mahathir Mohamad =

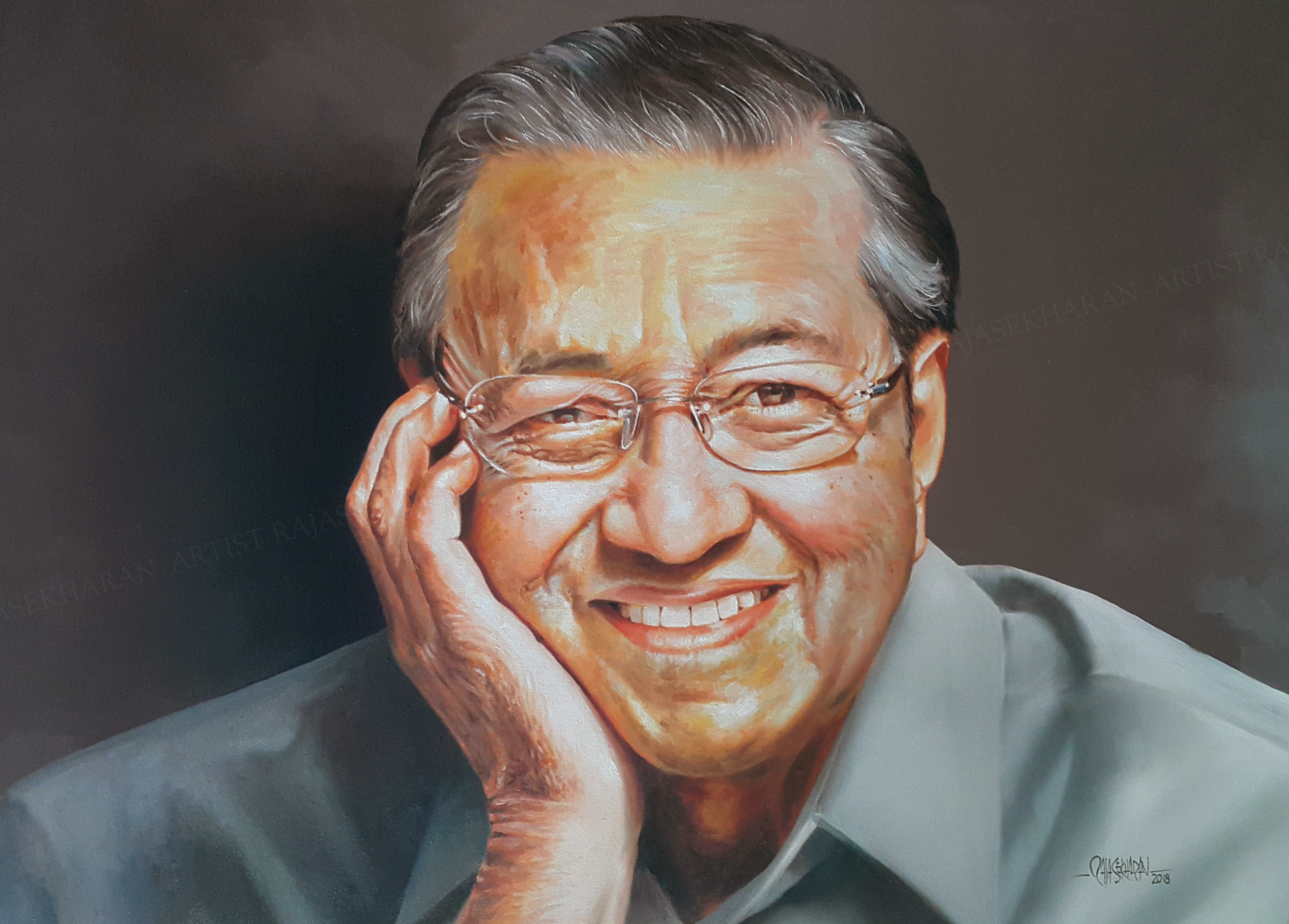
Oil painting of Mahathir by Indian art director Rajasekharan Parameswaran

Mahathir Mohamad has been portrayed many times in popular culture in recent years, due to his contributions to Malaysia's development, leadership, and global influence, earning numerous accolades throughout his political career.

Mahathir has been depicted in various cultural forms, reflecting his role in Malaysian history. In 2010, the musical Mahathir, the Musical portrayed his life from his early years to his political career, with Esma Daniel in the lead role. The production was well received and had an extended run. A sequel followed in 2011. In 2012, the play Teater Tun Siti Hasmah focused on his wife, Siti Hasmah, highlighting her career as a doctor and first lady, with Nazim Othman and Esma Daniel portraying Mahathir. A mural of Mahathir was unveiled in Alor Setar, Kedah in 2015. Internationally, a monument dedicated to Mahathir was inaugurated in Sarajevo, Bosnia and Herzegovina in December 2020, created by artist Enes Sivac. The monument includes an excerpt from Mahathir's speech at the International Conference of Parliamentarians on Bosnia-Herzegovina.

== Details and attributes ==
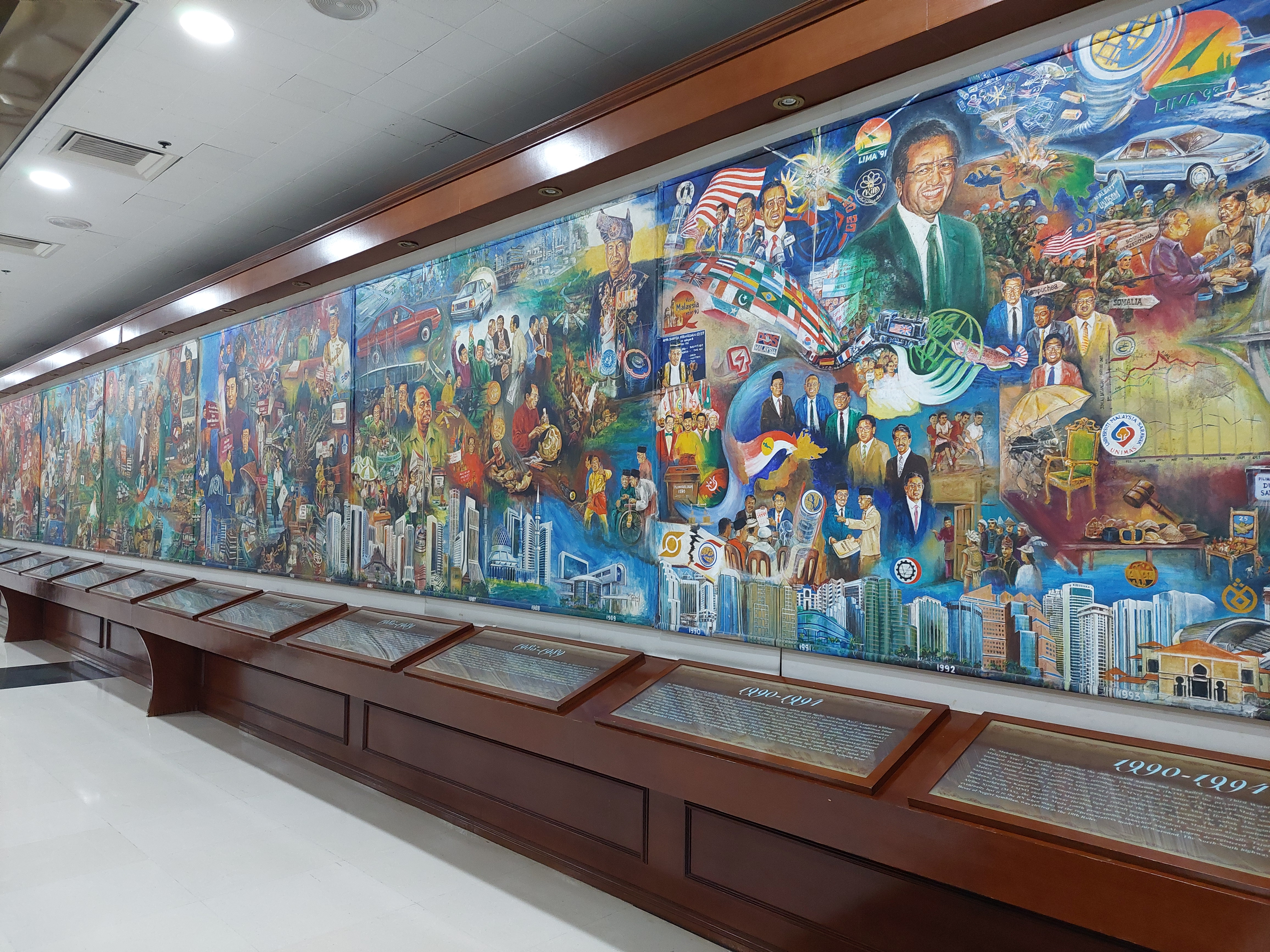
A mural painting at the World Trade Centre Kuala Lumpur depicts the timeline of Malaysia's history, with most of it focusing on Mahathir

In November 1995, the UMNO general assembly at the Putra World Trade Centre featured the Anugerah art gallery, which showcased portraits of party president Mahathir. Painted over three years by a Russian artist, the portrait was presented to Mahathir by the gallery owner, Ferri Anugerah Maamur. It depicts Mahathir in an oratory pose during the 1994 general assembly, with the Malaysian and UMNO flags in the background. Mahathir was also seen imitating the expression on the portrait exhibited in his honor.

In December 2002, a resilient petunia hybrid named “Mahathir flowers” was introduced by Ipoh nursery owner Hooi Suk Chang to honor Mahathir. The plant, created by cross-breeding imported and local variants, is known for thriving in direct sunlight and various environments.

On 7 October 2003, the Yang di-Pertuan Agong Tuanku Syed Sirajuddin opened the photo exhibition A Thousand Faces of Dr Mahathir at the National Art Gallery in Jalan Tun Razak, Kuala Lumpur. The exhibition was organized by the local media, who pooled their resources to showcase memorable images documenting Mahathir's 22-year career as Prime Minister. Within just two days, the exhibition attracted 6,000 visitors. Besides Mahathir and Siti Hasmah, Sarah Ali, the wife of Uganda’s First Deputy Prime Minister Moses Ali, and Semra Sezer, the wife of the Turkish President Ahmet Necdet Sezer, also attended the exhibition. In the same month, The One Academy in Petaling Jaya presented Mahathir with a portrait of himself, further celebrating his contributions to the nation.

In 2004, celebrated Malaysian cartoonist, Lat compiled his works from the New Straits Times' Scenes of Malaysian Life series, featuring Mahathir into a book entitled, Dr. Who?!: Capturing the Life and Times of a Leader in Cartoons, published by Berita Publishing. On 31 August, the Centre Court of Suria KLCC was transformed into an art gallery for a two-day exhibition titled 22 Years from The HeART as a tribute to Mahathir. The exhibition featured Merdeka-themed paintings by various artists, with each piece representing a year of Mahathir's 22-year tenure as Malaysia's fourth prime minister, capturing key moments in the nation's history.

In 2008, Eugene Yu created a comic strip chronicling the life of Mahathir, from his birth to his retirement as Malaysia's fourth prime minister. In 2010, actor Esma Daniel portrayed Mahathir in Mahathir, the Musical, a Malaysian production staged at Istana Budaya from September 24 to October 4. The musical depicted Mahathir's journey from his humble rural beginnings to becoming Malaysia's Prime Minister in 1981, highlighting key moments in his life and career until his retirement in 2003. Due to overwhelming public response, its run was extended by five days to October 9. Following its initial success, Mahathir, the Musical returned with a sequel in 2011, staged at Istana Budaya from January 21 to 30.

The 2011 Mandarin sitcom Time FM revisited key events from the 1980s to 1997, including Mahathir's appointment as Prime Minister, the launch of Malaysia's first national car, and the construction of the Penang Bridge. In November of the same year, the Malaysian National News Agency (Bernama) launched the Che Det coffee table book, depicting the great moments in the career of Mahathir as the country's fourth prime minister.

In November 2012, Teater Tun Siti Hasmah was staged at Istana Budaya, with Nazim Othman portraying a young Mahathir and Esma Daniel playing him as Prime Minister. The play, based on the life of Siti Hasmah, highlighted her journey as a doctor, wife, and supporter of Malaysia's fourth Prime Minister. Mahathir was portrayed by Nazril Idrus in the 2013 film Tanda Putera, directed by Shuhaimi Baba.

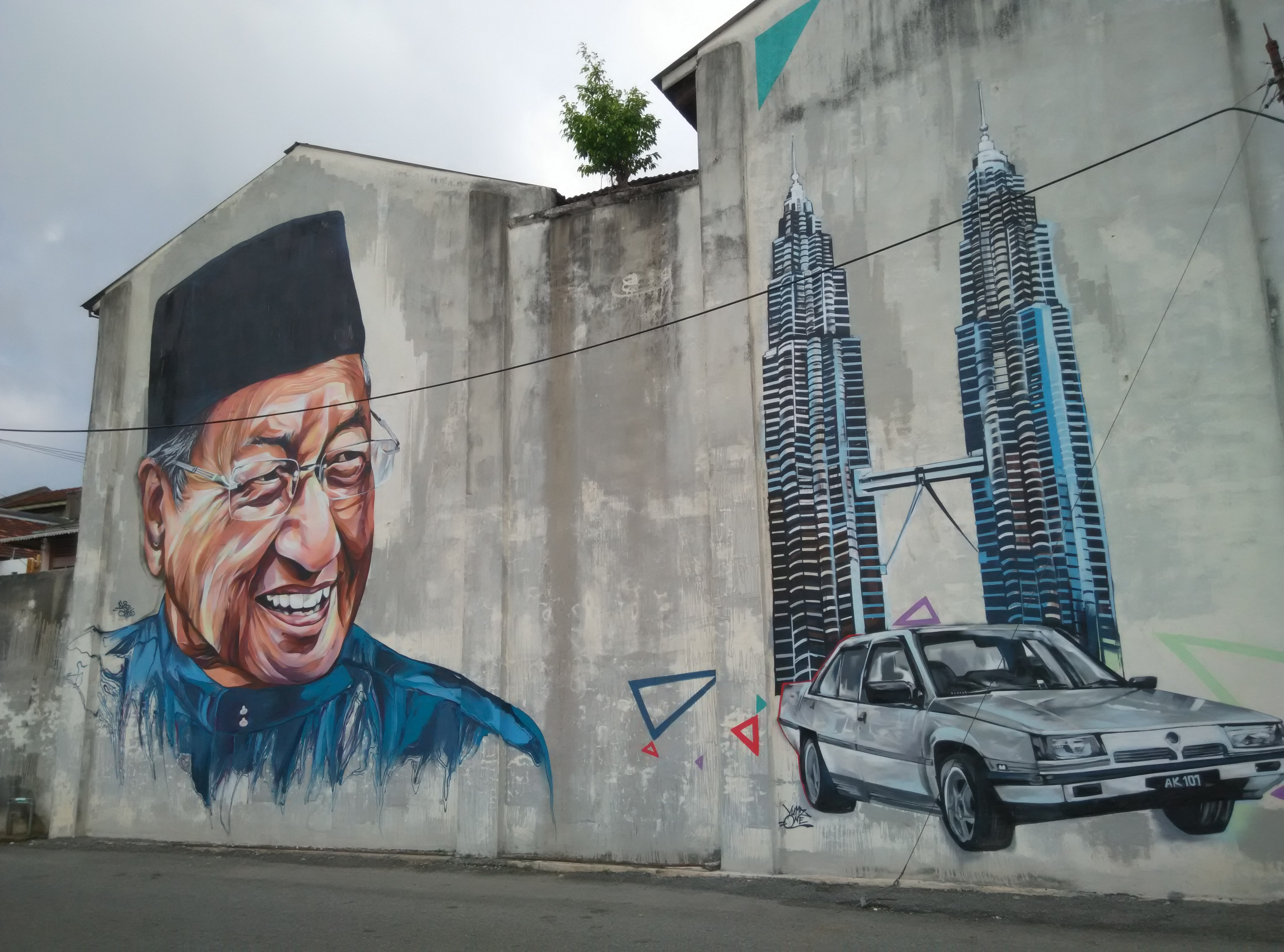
This mural in Jalan Pekan Melayu, Alor Setar, features Mahathir alongside the Petronas Twin Towers and Proton Saga, symbolizing his legacy as Malaysia's 'Father of Modernisation'.

On 6 June 2015, a mural of Mahathir was unveiled at Jalan Pekan Melayu, Alor Setar, as part of Kedah's 'Tourism Month of the Legend Kedah'. The 30.48-meter-wide mural, featuring Mahathir in traditional Kedah Malay attire alongside the Petronas Twin Towers and Proton Saga, symbolizes his legacy as Malaysia's 'Father of Modernisation'. Created by Mustakim Ismail and his team, the mural was completed in a week and has since become a local and tourist attraction.

Released on 17 September 2015, Kapsul is a science fiction film directed by Martias Ali. The story follows a time capsule of Vision 2020, buried by Mahathir, which is stolen, sending Zohri (played by Faizal Hussein) back to the past. Haeriyanto Hassan portrays Mahathir in the film. Mahathir also makes his acting debut in a cameo role in the film.

From July 24 to November 16, 2016, Ilham Gallery hosted an exhibition titled Era Mahathir, featuring over 44 works by 28 Malaysian artists. The collection included pieces completed during the 22-year administration of Mahathir, a period marked by the nation's transformation from an agrarian economy to an industrialized one. This era saw significant changes in the country's landscape through infrastructure and development projects, fostering a growing sense of national self-confidence symbolized by the slogan "Malaysia Boleh." The exhibition showcased both contemporaneous and recent works, offering insights into the complexities of that period through diverse artistic perspectives. On 13 December, a wax figure of Mahathir was unveiled at Madame Tussauds in Bangkok, Thailand.

In May 2018, Mahathir appeared as a cartoon character in an episode of Upin & Ipin titled "Terima Kasih Cikgu" ("Thank You, Teacher"). In the episode, Mahathir is depicted alongside his wife, Siti Hasmah, visiting a kindergarten. In the same June of that year, Malaysian Lego enthusiast Vincent Kiew crafted figures of Mahathir in a grey suit and Siti Hasmah in a pink outfit using Lego bricks, symbolizing their enduring love and Mahathir's influence.

In August 2018, an art exhibition titled Tun M: A Forever Legacy was held at Perdana University, Seri Kembangan, featuring nearly 100 artworks of Mahathir. The pieces, contributed by artists from over 40 countries, also included portraits of Siti Hasmah. Perdana University chief operating officer Norpisah Mat Isa said the exhibition was a tribute to Mahathir's immense contribution to the nation. Mahathir himself later also visited the exhibition. Meanwhile, a group of 20 Lego enthusiasts, after two months of work, unveiled a 76cm x 76cm Lego mural of Mahathir and Siti Hasmah on August 30 at Sunway Pyramid, made with 9,216 custom Lego pieces and featuring a unique "double-mirror" effect that allows viewers to see the images of Mahathir and Siti Hasmah from different angles.

In November 2018, Poh Kong Jewellers Sdn Bhd, Malaysia's largest jewellery retail chain, introduced a new patriotic symbol—the Gold Note of Hope—in honor of Mahathir. The 999.9 fine gold note showcases an autographed portrait of Mahathir, the Jalur Gemilang, iconic national landmarks, and the Bunga Raya, Malaysia's national flower.

On 11 November 2018, Mahathir visited Wisma Kebudayaan Soka Gakkai Malaysia (SGM) to open the "Splendours of Malaysia – Paintings of Ethnic Cultures of the Land" exhibition. During the event, National Artist Ismail Embong presented Mahathir with a painting depicting his first meeting with Soka Gakkai International (SGI) President Daisaku Ikeda in 1988.

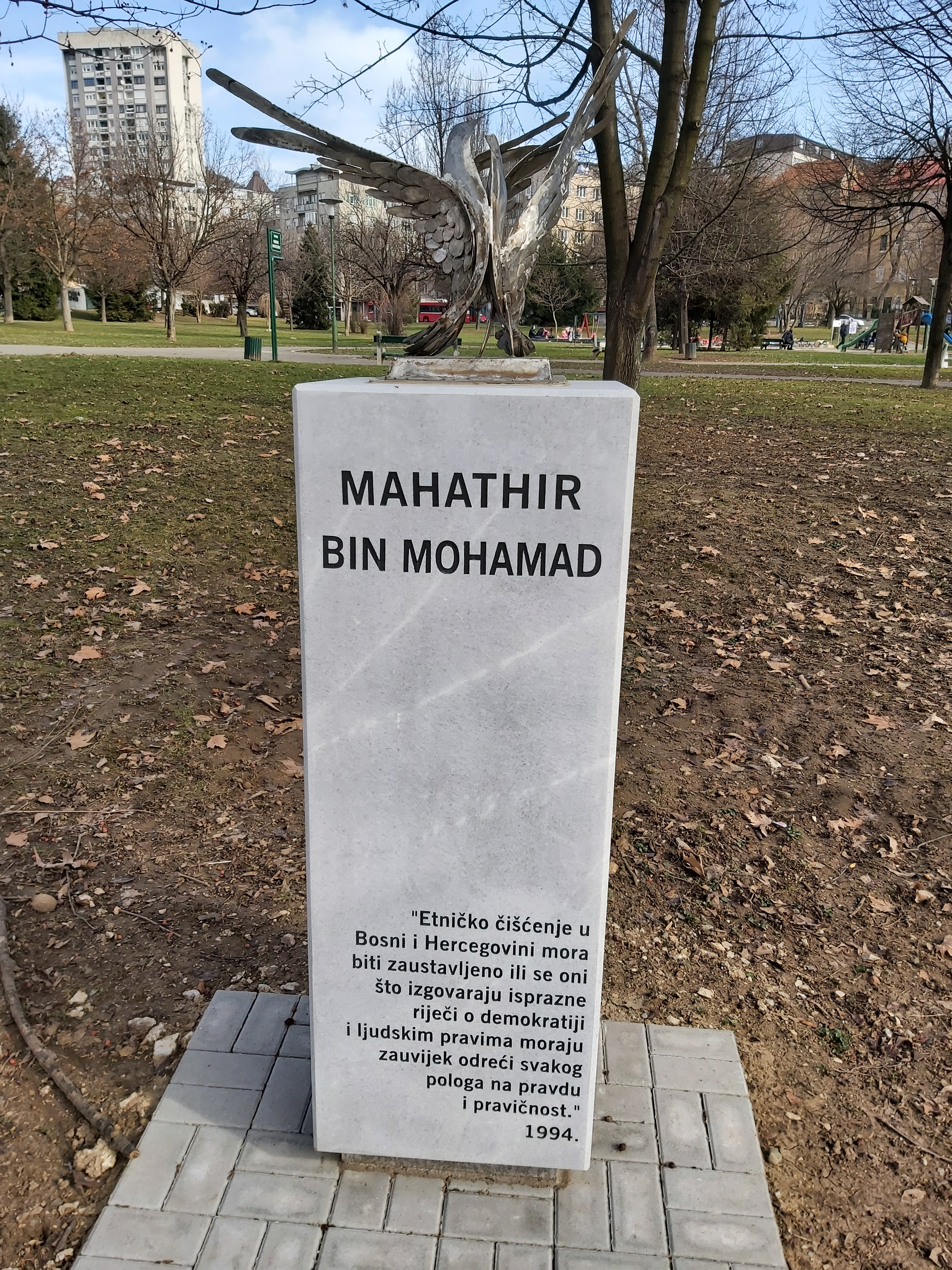
In 2020, a monument dedicated to Mahathir was erected in the Bosnian capital Sarajevo.

The following day, during an official visit to Singapore, an orchid hybrid named “Dendrobium Mahathir Siti Hasmah” was unveiled to honor Mahathir and his wife. The flower features mahogany petals, reddish-brown sepals with white edges, and a purple lip, growing up to 38 cm with 14 to 20 flowers per plant.

On 28 September 2019, a unique exhibition titled Tun M Custom Show was launched in Kuala Lumpur, celebrating Mahathir. The exhibition featured over 40 custom figurines created by local artists to mark Malaysia's Merdeka Day and Malaysia Day celebrations. Each artist was given a six-inch figurine to transform in their own creative way, all aimed at honoring Mahathir. Among them, toy designer Michael Chuah, starting in the same year in March, designed three versions of a vinyl figure of Mahathir, each with unique features.

On 24 December 2020, a monument dedicated to Mahathir was unveiled in Sarajevo, Bosnia and Herzegovina, at Kemal Monteno Park. The grey sculpture, created by artist Enes Sivac, commemorates Mahathir and Malaysia's invaluable assistance during Bosnia and Herzegovina's most challenging times and its recovery period. The monument features the final line of Mahathir's speech at the International Conference of Parliamentarians on Bosnia-Herzegovina, held in Kuala Lumpur. On 25 June 2023, Mahathir visited the monument and shared a photo of himself with it on Instagram, where the post received positive comments from his followers.
