= Miss Universe Malaysia 2016 =

- Date: 30 January 2016
- Presenters: Hansen Lee • Deborah Priya Henry
- Venue: Palace of the Golden Horses Hotel, Seri Kembangan, Malaysia
- Entrants: 14
- Placements: 8
- Winner: Kiran Jassal (Selangor)
- Congeniality: Nisha Sema (Penang)
- Photogenic: Dhivya Dhyana Suppiah (Kuala Lumpur)

Miss Universe Malaysia 2016, the 50th edition of Miss Universe Malaysia, was held on January 30, 2016, at the Palace of the Golden Horses Hotel, Selangor. Kiran Jassal of Selangor was crowned by the outgoing titleholder, Vanessa Tevi Kumares of Negeri Sembilan at the end of the event. She then represented Malaysia at the Miss Universe 2016 pageant in Manila, Philippines.

== Results ==
Final Results	Contestants
Miss Universe Malaysia 2016	Selangor – Kiranmeet Kaur Jassal
1st Runner–Up	Kuala Lumpur – Dhivya Dhyana Suppiah
2nd Runner–Up	Negeri Sembilan – Lina Soong
3rd Runner–Up	Penang – Swarna Naidu
4th Runner–Up	Penang – Nisha Sema
Top 8	Kuala Lumpur – Cindy Ng; Kuala Lumpur – Jennifer Ling; Perak – Alicia Tan

=== Gala Night Judges ===
- Sonny San
- Dato Dr Ko Chung Beng
- Zaihani Mohd Zain
- Shawn Loong
- Dato Sri Navneet Goenka
- Elaine Daly – Miss Universe Malaysia 2003
- Jeff Lee
- Datuk Wira Rahadian Mahmud Khalil
- Awal Ashaari – actor, model and television presenter

=== Preliminary Judges ===
- Dato' Farah Khan – founder and president of Malaysia's leading luxury retailer
- Gillian Hung – fashion guru
- Kavita Sidhu – Miss Charm International 1990, actress, fashion designer and producer
- Debbie Goh – malaysian actress
- Whulandary Herman – Miss Universe Indonesia 2013
- Sukanya Poljak – actress
- Aster Lim
- Shawn Loong

== Special awards ==
Awards	Contestants
Miss Photogenic	Kuala Lumpur – Dhivya Suppiah
Miss Talent	Negeri Sembilan – Lina Soong
Miss Best Body	Penang – Swarna Naidu
Miss Congeniality	Penang – Nisha Sema
Miss My Dentist Winning Smile 1	Penang – Swarna Naidu
Miss My Dentist Winning Smile 2	Selangor – Kiran Jassal
Miss Online Personality	Perak – Alicia Tan

== Judges ==
- Dato' Farah Khan - Founder and president of Malaysia's leading luxury retailer
- Gillian Hung - Fashion guru
- Kavita Sidhu - Miss Charm International 1990, Malaysian actress, fashion designer and a producer
- Debbie Goh - Malaysian actress
- Whulandary Herman - Miss Universe Indonesia 2013
- Sukanya Poljak - Actress
- Aster Lim
- Shawn Loong

== Contestants ==
The official Top 14 finalists of The Next Miss Universe Malaysia 2016.

No.	Contestant	Age	Height	Ethnicity	Hometown	Occupation	Notes
1.	Alicia Tan	25	5 ft 9 in (1.75 m)	Chinese	Ipoh, Perak	Accounting Student	Top 8
2.	Ariessa Leanne Lam Yin Yee	26	5 ft 7 in (1.70 m)	Chinese	Kinta, Perak	Make-up artist/Radio DJ	
3.	Cindy Ng	26	5 ft 8 1/2 in (1.74 m)	Chinese	Singapore City, Singapore	Social Entrepreneur	Top 8
4.	Dhivya Dhyana Suppiah	25	5 ft 9 1/2 in (1.77 m)	Indian	Bukit Bintang, K.L	Medical Student	1st Runner-up
5.	Hazelin Ng	22	5 ft 9 in (1.75 m)	Chinese	Kuching, Sarawak	Student	
6.	Jeniffer Ling	23	5 ft 7 in (1.70 m)	Chinese	Setiawangsa, K.L	Business Developer	Top 8
7.	Kiran Kaur Jassal	20	5 ft 8 1/2 in (1.74 m)	Punjabi	Subang Jaya, Selangor	Dentistry Student	Winner
8.	Lina Soong	25	5 ft 9 1/2 in (1.77 m)	Chinese	Seremban, N.9	Multimedia Student	2nd Runner-up
9.	Loveena Ruben	19	5 ft 6 1/2 in (1.69 m)	Indian	Titiwangsa, K.L	Media Student	
10.	Nisha Sema	22	5 ft 9 1/2 in (1.77 m)	Indian-Japanese	George Town, Penang	Mass Communications and Public Relations Student	4th Runner-up
11.	Rema Rao	26	5 ft 6 1/2 in (1.69 m)	Indian	George Town, Penang	Compliance Consultant	
12.	Shiat Teen	25	5 ft 7 in (1.70 m)	Chinese	Petaling Jaya, Selangor	Flight Attendant	
13.	Swarna Naidu	18	5 ft 6 in (1.68 m)	Indian	Mumbai, India	Hotel Management	3rd Runner-up
14.	Yen Nee	25	5 ft 6 1/2 in (1.69 m)	Chinese	Bukit Mertajam, Penang	Physiotherapist	

== Crossovers ==
Contestants who previously competed/appeared at other national beauty pageants:

Miss Malaysia World

- 2014 - Dhivya Dhyana Suppiah (3rd Runner-up)
