= Carey Ng =

Malaysian Chinese director and model

- Born: Carey Ng Sue Mun; 3 November 1988 (age 37); Putrajaya, Malaysia
- Height: 1.75 m (5 ft 9 in)
- Spouse: Roen Cian Nagapan (m. 2017)
- Children: 2
- Beauty pageant titleholder
- Title: Miss Universe Malaysia 2013
- Hair colour: Black
- Eye colour: Black
- Major competitions: Miss Universe Malaysia 2013 (Winner); Miss Universe 2013 (Unplaced)

Carey Ng

Chinese name
- Traditional Chinese: 莊淑慧
- Simplified Chinese: 庄淑慧
- Hanyu Pinyin: Zhuāng Shú Huì
- Pha̍k-fa-sṳ: Tsông Su̍k-fui
- Jyutping: Zong1 Suk6 Wai6
- Hokkien POJ: Chng Siok-hūi
- Tâi-lô: Tsng Siok-huī

Carey Ng Sue Mun also known as Carey Ng (simplified Chinese: 庄淑慧; traditional Chinese: 莊淑慧; pinyin: Zhuāng Shú Huì; Jyutping: Zong1 Suk6 Wai6; Pe̍h-ōe-jī: Chng Siok-hūi; Pha̍k-fa-sṳ: Tsông Su̍k-fui), is a Malaysian Chinese director, model and beauty pageant titleholder who was crowned Miss Malaysia 2013. She represented Malaysia at the Miss Universe 2013 and ended up did not make it to the semifinalists round, this is the 43rd consecutive year Malaysia did not placed in Miss Universe pageant.

== Miss Universe ==
=== Miss Universe Malaysia 2013 ===
Ng competed in her country's national beauty pageant Miss Universe Malaysia 2013, held 10 December 2012 at the Setia City Convention Centre, where she became the eventual winner of the Miss Universe Malaysia title, gaining the right to represent her nation as the official representative of Malaysia to the 2013 Miss Universe pageant.

=== Miss Universe 2013 ===
Ng participated in Miss Universe 2013 representing Malaysia but did not place.

=== National Director of Miss Universe Malaysia Organization ===
Ng was appointed as the national director of the Miss Universe Malaysia Organization (MUMO) in September 2014. She received criticism from pageant fans over the crowning of Miss Universe Malaysia 2015, Vanessa Tevi. The results were also criticised by French fashion and beauty expert, Inès Ligron on her Facebook posting. In 2016, a couple of days after the crowning of Kiran Jassal (Miss Universe Malaysia 2016), Ng resigned as national director of the pageant.

== Career ==
In her modelling career, Ng has graced the covers of Female Magazine, August Man and FHM. In July 2015, Ng modelled in a spread for Style Magazine which featured bags by Louis Vuitton.

Ng has appeared in television advertisements for MyEG and MAS, and is an official ambassador for Reebok Malaysia.

== Personal life ==
Ng wed entrepreneur Roen Cian Nagapan in 2017. The couple has two daughters.

Awards and achievements
Preceded by Kimberley Leggett	Miss Universe Malaysia; 2013	Succeeded by Sabrina Beneett
