= Farah Khan (disambiguation) =

Farah Khan is an Indian film director and choreographer

Farah Khan can also refer to:

- Farah Khan (businesswoman), a Singaporean businesswoman
- Farrah Khan, an American politician
- Louis Farrakhan, an American religious leader
