= Miss Universe Malaysia 2014 =

- Date: 19 December 2013
- Presenters: Jason Godfrey • Sarimah Ibrahim • Ben Ibrahim
- Entertainment: Natalia Tang Ling • Z Chen • Benjamin Toong
- Venue: Setia City Convention Centre, Shah Alam, Malaysia
- Entrants: 19
- Placements: 10
- Winner: Sabrina Beneett; Perak
- Congeniality: Livonia Ricky Guing (Sarawak)
- Photogenic: Lalitha Monisha Ramesh (Sabah)

Miss Universe Malaysia 2014, the 48th edition of the Miss Universe Malaysia, was held on 19 December 2013 at Setia City Convention Centre, Shah Alam, Selangor. Sabrina Benett of Perak was crowned by the outgoing titleholder, Carey Ng of Putrajaya at the end of the event. She then represented Malaysia at the Miss Universe 2014 pageant in Miami, United States.

== Placements ==
Final Results	Contestants
Miss Universe Malaysia 2014	Perak – Sabrina Beneett
1st Runner–Up	Sabah – Lalitha Ramesh
2nd Runner–Up	Sarawak – Kausalya Ida
3rd Runner–Up	Penang – Lynn Lim
4th Runner–Up	Selangor – Karina Grewal
Top 10	Kuala Lumpur – Foong Tsin; Penang – Shangkharee Nadarajan; Perak – Denise Th'ng; Sarawak – Elaine Wong; Selangor – Jean Lim

=== Judges ===
- Wan Ahmad Wan Abas
- Reshmonu
- Carmen Soo
- Andrew Tan
- Sazzy Falak
- Dr Daniel Yap
- Miko Au

== Special awards ==
Awards	Contestants
Miss Radiant Skin	Penang – Lyn Lim
Miss Elegant	Selangor – Jean Lim
Miss Best Body	Sarawak – Kausalya Ida
Miss Photogenic	Sabah – Lalitha Monisha
Miss Congeniality	Sarawak – Livonia Ricky
Miss My Dentist Winning Smile	Penang – Lyn Lim
Malaysia Choice	Selangor – Karina Grewal

== Contestants ==
Official 19 Finalists of Miss Universe Malaysia 2014.

No.	Contestant	Age	Height	Ethnicity	Hometown	Occupation	Notes
1	Cheryll Ho	20	5 ft 7 in (1.70 m)	Chinese	Perak	Part-time Model	
2	Cynthia Chan	24	5 ft 7 1/2 in (1.71 m)	Chinese	Melaka	Corporate Communication Executive	
3	Denise Th'ng	19	5 ft 7 2/3 in (1.72 m)	Chinese	Perak	Business Student	Top 10
4	Elaine Wong	22	5 ft 8 1/2 in (1.74 m)	Chinese	Sarawak	Business & Commerce Student	Top 10
5	Foong Tsin	25	5 ft 9 1/2 in (1.77 m)	Chinese	Kuala Lumpur	Investment Banking Executive	Top 10
6	Hema Gayathiry	23	5 ft 10 in (1.78 m)	Indian	Selangor	Petroleum Engineering Student	
7	Jean Lim	23	5 ft 9 2/3 in (1.77 m)	Chinese	Selangor	Management & Marketing Student	Top 10
8	Karina Grewal	25	5 ft 7 in (1.70 m)	Indian	Selangor	Law Graduate	4th Runner-up
9	Kausalya Ida	25	5 ft 7 in (1.70 m)	Iban	Sarawak	Law Student	2nd Runner-up
10	Kim Goh	23	5 ft 7 1/2 in (1.71 m)	Chinese	Penang	Accounting Student	
11	Lalitha Monisha Ramesh	21	5 ft 10 in (1.78 m)	Indian	Sabah	Law Graduate	1st Runner-up
12	Livonia Ricky Guing	22	5 ft 7 1/2 in (1.71 m)	Bidayuh	Sarawak	Culinary Science Student	
13	Lyn Lim	24	5 ft 7 in (1.70 m)	Chinese	Penang	Psychology Student	3rd Runner-up
14	Nicole Main Aldeth	22	5 ft 6 in (1.68 m)	Indian	Selangor	Creative Design Student	
15	Patricia Lee	24	5 ft 5 2/3 in (1.67 m)	Chinese	Negeri Sembilan	Member Services Management	
16	Ramona Kanapathy	23	5 ft 7 1/2 in (1.71 m)	Chindian	Perak	Mass Communication Student	
17	Sabrina Beneett	23	5 ft 10 1/2 in (1.79 m)	Indian	Perak	Psychology & Communication Student	Winner
18	Shangkharee Nadarajan	23	5 ft 9 in (1.75 m)	Chinese	Penang	Medical Student	Top 10
19	Vivian Chew Cheah	23	5 ft 9 1/2 in (1.77 m)	Chinese	Selangor	Architectural Designer	

== Top 40 ==
The contestant that was chosen as official candidate.

No.	Contestant	Age	Represented	Notes
1	Amber Ng	19	Batu Pahat, Johor	
2	Patricia Lee	24	Seremban, Negeri Sembilan	Top 19
3	Ruth Jacob	25	Mont Kiara, Kuala Lumpur	
4	Elaine Wong	22	Sibu, Sarawak	Top 19
5	Ramona Kanapathy	23	Ipoh, Perak	Top 19
6	Junn Loh	22	Kuala Lumpur	
7	Patricia Ho	21	Malacca	
8	Sabrina Chan	21	Ipoh, Perak	
9	Sabrina Beneett	23	Ipoh, Perak	Top 19
10	Sheena Kujalan	23	Petaling Jaya, Selangor	
11	Joey Pang	21	Subang Jaya, Selangor	
12	Denise Th'ng	19	Shah Alam, Selangor	Top 19
13	Adeline Lee	22	Terengganu	
14	Lalitha Monisha Ramesh	20	Kota Kinabalu, Sabah	Top 19
15	Nicole Main Aldeth	21	Subang Jaya, Selangor	Top 19
16	Jean Lim	23	Klang, Selangor	Top 19
17	Cheryll Ho	19	Petaling Jaya, Selangor	Top 19
18	Shari Dawson	21	Penang	
19	Jennifer Teh	24	Kuala Lumpur	
20	Lyn Lim	24	Kuala Lumpur	Top 19
21	Lynn Sia	21	Puchong, Selangor	
22	Mabel Chan	23	Subang Jaya, Selangor	
23	Hema Gayathiry	23	Shah Alam, Selangor	Top 19
24	Eling Liew	23	Johor Bahru, Johor	
25	Foong Tsin	25	Kuala Lumpur	Top 19
26	Carron Kho	21	Kuching, Sarawak	
27	Livonia Ricky Guing	22	Kuching, Sarawak	Top 19
28	Kim Goh	23	Penang	Top 19
29	Karina Grewal	25	Petaling Jaya, Selangor	Top 19
30	Joanna Sharmilavathi	25	Petaling Jaya, Selangor	
31	Joyce Ang	20	Kedah	
32	Cynthia Chan	24	Subang Jaya, Selangor	Top 19
33	Yvonne Chow	23	Johor Bahru, Johor	
34	Kausalya Ida	25	Kuching, Sarawak	Top 19
35	Vivian Chew Cheah	23	Petaling Jaya, Selangor	Top 19
36	Shangkharee Nadarajan	23	Penang	Top 19
37	Justwin Tan	20	Petaling Jaya, Selangor	
38	Claudia Pangkas	19	Miri, Sarawak	
39	Kohinoor Kaur	20	Kota Kinabalu, Sabah	
40	Sonia Naidu	19	Kuching, Sarawak	

== Crossovers ==
Miss Tourism Queen International Borneo

- 2015 - Livonia Ricky Guing (Unplaced)

Miss Global International Malaysia

- 2015 - Livonia Ricky Guing (2nd Runner-up)
- 2013 - Livonia Ricky Guing (Top 6)

Miss India Malaysia

- 2013 - Sabrina Beneett (2nd Runner-up)

Miss Earth Malaysia

- 2012 - Livonia Ricky Guing (Unplaced)

Miss Selangor Kebaya

- 2011 - Sabrina Beneett (Winner)

Dewi Remaja (Miss Teen Malaysia)

- 2010 - Shangkharee Nadarajan (2nd Runner-up)

Miss Borneo Beautiful

- 2009 - Livonia Ricky Guing (Winner)
