= Jangan Pandang Belakang Congkak =

- Directed by: Ahmad Idham
- Written by: Ahmad Idham; Zulkeflee Said
- Screenplay by: Ahmad Idham
- Produced by: David Teo
- Starring: Shaheizy Sam; Lan Pet Pet; Cat Farish
- Cinematography: Indra Che Muda
- Edited by: Ahmad Mustadha
- Music by: Brian Ng
- Production company: Metrowealth Pictures
- Distributed by: MIG Pictures
- Release date: June 4, 2009 (Malaysia)
- Running time: 90 minutes
- Country: Malaysia
- Box office: MYR 6.15 million

Jangan Pandang Belakang Congkak (English: Don't Look Back Congkak) is a 2009 Malaysian Malay-language horror comedy film directed by Ahmad Idham. It was produced after the success of Idham's previous horror movies - Jangan Pandang Belakang and Congkak.

== Plot ==
The film tells the story of three youths from Kuala Lumpur: Punai (Mazlan Pet Pet), a car jockey; Asmat (Cat Farish), a cleaner and aspiring rapper; and Johan (Sam Shaheizy), an aspiring actor.

Each of them receives a letter from the late Pak Sudir (Piee), inviting them to his house. Upon their arrival, they meet Pak Sudir's assistant, Mustika (Lisa Surihani), and discover that Pak Sudir was actually their grandfather, who happens to be very wealthy.

The three of them have a chance to inherit all of his belongings and wealth, but under strict conditions: they must stay at his house for three consecutive days without touching anything, especially an old congkak. On the very first night, strange occurrences begin to happen.

== Cast ==
- Shaheizy Sam as Johan
- Cat Farish as Asmat
- Lan Pet Pet as Punai
- Lisa Surihani as Mustika
- Azlee Jaafar as Pak Mor
- Piee as Pak Sudir
- Den Wahab as Latiff
- Belalang as Megat
- Dina as Ziana
- Zarina Zainoordin as Wati
- Mas Muharni as Wawa
