= Miss Universe Malaysia 2017 =

- Date: 23 February 2017
- Presenters: Joey G • Amelia Henderson
- Entertainment: Chen Xiao • Vince Chong • Harith Iskander
- Venue: The Majestic Hotel, Kuala Lumpur
- Broadcaster: Diva (TV channel); Hurr.tv (Online broadcaster)
- Entrants: 17
- Placements: 10
- Winner: Samantha Katie James (Kuala Lumpur)
- Congeniality: Karshini Ganesh (Johor)

Miss Universe Malaysia 2017, the 51st edition of the Miss Universe Malaysia, was held on 23 February 2017 at the Majestic Hotel, Kuala Lumpur. Samantha James of Kuala Lumpur of was crowned by the outgoing titleholder, Kiran Jassal of Selangor at the end of the event. She then represented Malaysia at the Miss Universe 2017 pageant in Las Vegas, United States.

== Results ==
Final Results	Contestants
Miss Universe Malaysia 2017	Kuala Lumpur – Samantha Katie James
1st Runner–Up	Selangor – Dana Low
2nd Runner–Up	Penang – Ollemadthee Kunasagaran
3rd Runner–Up	Sabah – Laura Simon
Top 10	Johor – Karshini Ghanesh; Kuala Lumpur – Savina Vanan; Kuala Lumpur – Peh Leon; Penang – Gina Phillips; Penang – Tanalaksiumy Rayer; Sarawak – Sonia Naidu

=== Gala Night Judges ===
- Andrea Fonseka – Former Miss Malaysia Universe 2004 and former national director of Miss Universe Malaysia
- Dato' Hans Isaac – Malaysian actor, Writer, Director and producer
- Judrieana Jamaludin - Marketing Manager (Malaysia), NBCUniversal International Networks
- Shawn Loong – Malaysian hair stylist
- Rizman Nordin – Malaysian fashion designer
- Datuk Sri Navneet Goenka - Founder & Vice President of CERES Jewels
- Debbie Goh – Actress and former beauty queen

=== Pre-interview Judges ===
- Andrea Fonseka – Miss Universe Malaysia 2004
- Kartini Arrifin – Director of iM4U Radio
- Hui Mathews – Founder of ash be nimble
- Sunita Chhabra – editor, Life Inspired (a pull-out in The Star)
- Dato' Sri Raja Rezza Shah @ Shah Rezza - Movie Producer, Founder of the Islamic Fashion Festival (IFF) 2006
- Lina Tan - Filmmaker

== Special awards ==
Awards	Contestants
Face of Ash-Be-Nimble	Kuala Lumpur – Samantha Katie
Top 3	Sabah – Laura Simon; Kuala Lumpur – Peh Leon
Miss Glamorous Eyes	Labuan – Erica Tan
Miss Congeniality	Johor – Karshini Ganesh
Miss Online Personality	Sarawak – Sonia Naidu
Miss Body Beautiful	Selangor – Dana Low
Miss Natural Beauty	Kuala Lumpur – Peh Leon
Miss Beautiful Skin	Labuan – Erica Tan
Miss Naza Maserati	Sarawak – Sonia Naidu
Miss Tsubaki	Kuala Lumpur – Samantha Katie
Face of La Juiceria	Kuala Lumpur – Samantha Katie

== Contestants ==
Official 17 Finalists of Miss Universe Malaysia 2017.

No.	Contestant	Age	Height	Ethnicity	Hometown	Occupation	Notes
1	Dana Low	21	5 ft 7 1/2 in (1.71 m)	Chinese	Subang Jaya, Selangor	Communications Student	1st Runner-up
2	Dewina Petrus Guriting	25	5 ft 5 1/2 in (1.66 m)	Kadazan-dusun	Kota Kinabalu, Sabah	Freelance Model	
3	Erica Mae Tan	25	5 ft 7 1/2 in (1.71 m)	Chinese	Victoria City, Labuan	Biomedical Science Graduate	
4	Gina Phillips	21	5 ft 6 in (1.68 m)	Chinese Irish	George Town, Penang	Social Science Student	Top 10
5	Jaspreet Kaur Gill	23	5 ft 7 in (1.70 m)	Punjabi	Ipoh, Perak	Accounting Student	
6	Karshini Ghanesh	19	5 ft 6 1/2 in (1.69 m)	Indian	Johor Bahru, Johor	Medical Student	Top 10
7	Laura Simon	24	5 ft 7 2/3 in (1.72 m)	Kadazan-dusun Chinese	Kota Kinabalu, Sabah	Personal Trainer/Fencing Coach	3rd Runner-up
8	Maegan Yip Rue Vey	24	5 ft 8 in (1.73 m)	Chinese	Ampang, Selangor	Entrepreneurship Development Executive	
9	Michelle Soin Syeh Ling	20	5 ft 7 1/2 in (1.71 m)	Chinese	Muar, Johor	Law Student	
10	Nicolle Tan Jia Yi	19	5 ft 6 in (1.68 m)	Chinese	Petaling Jaya, Selangor	Psychology Student	
11	Ollemadthee Kunasagaran	24	5 ft 7 1/2 in (1.71 m)	Indian	George Town, Penang	Engineering Graduate	2nd Runner-up
12	Peh Leon	23	5 ft 7 2/3 in (1.72 m)	Chinese	Sri Hartamas, K.L	Finance Manager	Top 10
13	~~Samantha Katie James~~	~~22~~	~~5 ft 7 in (1.70 m)~~	~~Chinese Brazilian~~	~~Klang, Selangor~~	~~Professional Model/Actress~~	~~Winner~~ (Dethroned)
14	Savina Vanan	24	5 ft 7 2/3 in (1.72 m)	Indian	Ampang, Kuala Lumpur	Marketing Associate	Top 10
15	Sonia Naidu Devakrishnan	22	5 ft 7 2/3 in (1.72 m)	Bidayuh Indian	Kuching City, Sarawak	Rates Analyst	Top 10
16	Tammy Marion Singho	20	5 ft 7 2/3 in (1.72 m)	British Portuguese Indian	Shah Alam, Selangor	Business Model	
17	Tanalaksiumy Mahenthiran Rayer	22	5 ft 7 2/3 in (1.72 m)	Indian Chinese	Bukit Mertajam, Penang	National Athlete/Accounting Student	Top 10

== Top 50 ==
The Top 50 contestants was announced via Miss Universe Malaysia official website.

The contestant that was chosen as official candidate.

No.	Contestant	Age	Height	Ethnicity	Audition Place
1	Ollemadthee Kunasagaran	24	171 cm	Indian	Penang
2	Gina Phillips	21	168 cm	Eurasian	Penang
3	Mahalakshmi Raja Gopal	26	172 cm	Indian	Penang
4	Hazelyn Ng	20	168 cm	Chinese	Penang
5	Harcanaa Elankovan	19	173 cm	Punjabi	Penang
6	Khoo Juu Yei	23	169 cm	Chinese	Penang
7	Sarah Lim	20	170 cm	Chinese	Penang
8	Dewina Petrus Guriting	25	166 cm	Kadazandusun	Sabah
9	Chyna Stephens	20	168 cm	Kadazandusun	Sabah
10	Laura Simon	24	172 cm	Kadazandusun	Sabah
11	Deidra Cassandra	23	171 cm	Kadazandusun	Sabah
12	Amy Leong	23	173 cm	Chinese	Sarawak
13	Chong Yiik Li	22	168 cm	Chinese	Sarawak
14	Fiona Wilson	20	170 cm	Iban	Sarawak
15	Khu Zhiou Ru	21	171 cm	Chinese	Sarawak
16	Lee Mindy	22	170 cm	Chinese	Johor
17	Michelle Soin	20	171 cm	Chinese	Johor
18	Janice Lim	23	178 cm	Chinese	Johor
19	Narishma Tiwari	23	177 cm	Indian	Johor
20	Chong Li May	18	168 cm	Chinese	Kuala Lumpur
21	Dana Low	21	171 cm	Chinese	Kuala Lumpur
22	Erica Tan	25	173 cm	Chinese	Kuala Lumpur
23	Gaya**	25	168 cm	Indian	Kuala Lumpur
24	Maegan Yip	23	173 cm	Chinese	Selangor
25	Jaspreet Kaur	23	170 cm	Indian	Kuala Lumpur
26	Karshini Ganesh	19	169 cm	Indian	Kuala Lumpur
27	Kirsten**	18	170 cm	Chinese	Kuala Lumpur
28	Lynn Sia	24	174 cm	Chinese	Kuala Lumpur
29	Meme Yaw	22	172 cm	Chinese	Kuala Lumpur
30	Juliet Ching Seet Yen	25	171 cm	Chinese	Kuala Lumpur
31	Ng Sher Yin	19	168 cm	Chinese	Kuala Lumpur
32	Nicolle Tan	19	168 cm	Chinese	Kuala Lumpur
33	Peh Leon	23	172 cm	Chinese	Kuala Lumpur
34	Samantha Katie James	21	170 cm	Caucasian	Kuala Lumpur
35	Savina Vanan	24	172 cm	Indian	Kuala Lumpur
36	Sonia Naidu	22	172 cm	Indian	Sarawak
37	Su Hsien	22	178 cm	Chinese	Kuala Lumpur
38	Tai Fung Ying Tan	22	175 cm	Chinese	Kuala Lumpur
39	Tammy Marion Singho	20	172 cm	Eurasian	Kuala Lumpur
40	Tanalaksiumy M. Rayer	22	172 cm	Indian	Kuala Lumpur
41	Tanisha Suwandy	18	172 cm	Indian	Kuala Lumpur
42	Wong Yi Sheong	21	175 cm	Chinese	Kuala Lumpur
43	Zara Tam	24	172 cm	Chinese	Kuala Lumpur
44	Karen Kaur	22	178 cm	Indian	Kuala Lumpur
45	Mohana Ramanee	24	178 cm	Indian	Kuala Lumpur
46	Victoria Ann De Souza	22	177 cm	Caucasian	Selangor
47	Abby Teoh	21	173 cm	Chinese	Selangor
48	Delveena Kaur	22	175 cm	Indian	Selangor
49	Esdelyn Litia	25	168 cm	Chinese	Pahang
50	Loo Liu Yan	20	170 cm	Chinese	Kedah

== Crossovers ==
Contestants who previously competed/appeared at other national beauty pageants:

Miss Glam World

- 2018 -Tanalaksiumy M. Rayer (Top 15/Miss Fitness Collabs)

Miss Glam Malaysia

- 2018 -Tanalaksiumy M. Rayer (Winner)

Glam Next Face Malaysia

- 2018 - Sonia Naidu Devakrishnan (Winner)

Face of Beauty International

- 2017 - Ollemadthee Kunasagaran (4th Runner-up)

Face of Beauty Malaysia

- 2017 - Ollemadthee Kunasagaran (Winner)

Miss India Penang

- 2016 - Ollemadthee Kunasagaran (Winner)

Miss Global International Sabah

- 2016 - Dewina Petrus Guriting (2nd Runner-up)

Unduk Ngadau

- 2016 - Laura Simon

(Represent Likas)

Unduk Ngadau Kota Kinabalu

- 2016 - Laura Simon (1st Runner-up)
- 2016 - Dewina Petrus Guriting (5th Runner-up)

Unduk Ngadau Pertisa

- 2016 - Dewina Petrus Guriting (1st Runner-up)

Miss Borneo Kebaya

- 2015 - Sonia Naidu Devakrishnan (Winner)

Miss Earth Sabah

- 2015 - Dewina Petrus Guriting (Finalists Top 12)

Miss Scuba Sabah

- 2014 - Dewina Petrus Guriting (2nd Runner-up)

Miss Universe Malaysia

- 2013 - Samantha Katie James (Top 8)

Miss Global International

- 2013 - Dewina Petrus Guriting (Finalists Top 18)

Miss World Malaysia

- 2012 - Jaspreet Kaur Gill (Finalists Top 17)

Miss Earth Sabah

- 2011 - Dewina Petrus Guriting (Finalists Top 12)

Unduk Ngadau Sabah

- 2011 - Laura Simon

Unduk Ngadau Klang

- 2011 - Laura Simon (Winner)

Miss Tourism Queen International Borneo

- 2010 - Dewina Petrus Guriting (Finalists Top 10)
