= Pierre Andre =

Malaysian actor, director and writer

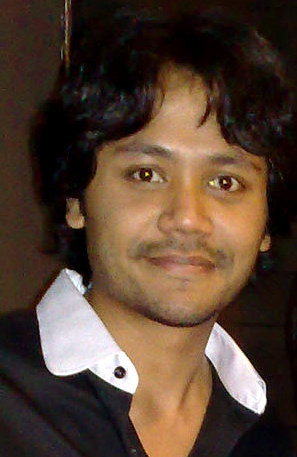
- Andre in 2008
- Born: Muhammad Pierre Andre bin Nazrul Andre; 17 March 1985 (age 41); Kuala Lumpur, Malaysia
- Other name: Pierre
- Occupations: Actor; director; writer; YouTuber; Internet personality
- Years active: 2005–2016, 2020–present
- Spouse: Siti Nur Hidayah Hashim (m. 2013)
- Children: 2
- Awards: Anugerah Yasmin Ahmad

YouTube information
- Channel: Andre Brothers Pictures
- Genres: Vlog; drama
- Subscribers: 270 thousand
- Views: 20.2 million
- Last updated: 4 August 2026

Muhammad Pierre Andre bin Nazrul Andre (born 17 March 1985) is a Malaysian actor, director and writer, born of mixed Malay-French descent.

His role as Reza in the 2005 film Gol & Gincu was his first major role. Since then, he has since appeared in other films and TV series, as well written a screenplay, and directed his first movie. After his last directed movie, Kecoh Primadona Kena Hantu was released in 2016, Andre went on indefinite hiatus from showbiz.

== Personal life ==
He is the eldest child of the Malaysian actress Khatijah Tan and her husband, Nazarul Andre (born Philip Harry-Andre), who is of French descent. His younger brother is the Malaysian actor and director, Mikail Andre.

After becoming engaged on 9 February 2013, Andre married Siti Nur Hidayah Hashim on 23 June 2013. He has a daughter from that marriage.

== Filmography ==
=== Feature films ===
Year	Title	Credited as			Role	Notes
Year	Title	Actor	Director	Writer	Role	Notes
2005	Potret Mistik	Yes	No	No	Badrul	
2005	Cinta Fotokopi	Yes	No	No	Din	
2005	Lady Boss	Yes	No	No	Friend Izwan 2	
2005	Gol & Gincu	Yes	No	No	Reza	
2005	Salon	Yes	No	No	Ezra Fernandez	
2005	Pontianak Harum Sundal Malam II	Yes	No	No	Purnama	
2006	Cinta	Yes	No	No	Taufiq	
2006	Main-Main Cinta	Yes	No	No	Farid	
2007	Jangan Pandang Belakang	Yes	No	Yes	Darma	
2007	9 September	Yes	Yes	Yes	Kogi	
2007	Dunia Baru The Movie	Yes	No	No	Muhd Adif	
2008	Congkak	No	No	Yes	—	
2008	I'm Not Single	No	Yes	Yes	—	
2008	Sepi	Yes	No	No	Khalil	
2008	Selamat Pagi Cinta	Yes	No	No	Ilham	
2009	Jangan Tegur	Yes	Yes	Yes	Kamal	
2009	Krazy Crazy Krezy	Yes	No	No	—	
2010	Lampu Merah	Yes	Yes	Yes	Rizal	
2011	Al-Hijab	Yes	Yes	Yes	Rafael	
2011	Seru	Yes	Yes	Yes	Bob	
2011	3,2,1 Cinta	Yes	No	No	Fariz	
2012	Chantek	Yes	Yes	Yes	AD Ady	
2012	3 Temujanji	Yes	No	No	Sein	
2012	Gerimis Mengundang	Yes	No	No	Pierre	
2012	X	Yes	No	No	Hafiz	
2012	Aku, Kau & Dia	Yes	Yes	Yes	Abang Harris	
2012	Strawberi Cinta	Yes	No	No	Hakimi	
2013	Pada Suatu Cinta Dahulu	Yes	No	No	Zainal adults	
2013	Cerita Kita	No	Yes	Yes	—	
2013	Langgar	No	No	Yes	—	
2013	1 Lawan Satu	No	Yes	Yes	—	
2013	Paku Pontianak	No	No	Yes	—	
2013	Longkai	Yes	No	No	Mubarak	
2013	Highland Tower	No	Yes	Yes	—	
2013	Ustaz, Mu Tunggu Aku Datang	No	Yes	Yes	—	
2014	Muka Surat Cinta	No	Yes	Yes	—	
2014	Sniper	No	Yes	Yes	—	
2014	Jin	No	Yes	Yes	—	
2014	Kasut Ku Kusut	No	Yes	Yes	—	
2014	Cerita Hantu Malaysia	No	Yes	Yes	—	
2015	Apartment	No	Yes	Yes	—	
2016	Kecoh Primadona Kena Hantu	No	Yes	Yes	—	
2024	Jangan Pandang Belakang 2: Aku Tahu Asal Usulmu	Yes	Yes	No	Darma	Cameo
2025	Dajal: Satu Malam Dipedajal	No	Yes	Yes	—	
2026	Nar'sata: Sekutu Setan	No	Yes	Yes	—	

=== Television ===
Year	Title	Role	TV channel
2007	Anugerah Skrin 2007	Entertainer	TV3
2012	Anugerah Skrin 2012	Entertainer	TV3
2013	Salam Muslim	Himself/guest	Astro Oasis

=== Television series ===
Year	Title	Credited as			Role	TV channel
Year	Title	Actor	Director	Writer	Role	TV channel
2006–2007	Gol & Gincu The Series	Yes	No	No	Reza	8TV
2006–2008	Dunia Baru	Yes	No	No	Muhd Adif	TV3
2009	Cik Ah Cik Nin	Yes	No	No	Roshan	Astro Prima
2010	Siong	Yes	No	No	Amzar	TV3
2010	Tiramisu	Yes	No	No	Dani Mirza	TV3
2010	Halimah Jongang The Series	Yes	No	No	Ali	Astro Prima
2011	Ana Lulu	No	Yes	Yes	—	TV3
2013	Dewi Lasak	No	Yes	Yes	—	TV3

=== Television films ===
Year	Title	Credited as			Role	TV channel
Year	Title	Actor	Director	Writer	Role	TV channel
2009	Hantu Raya	Yes	No	No	Yusof	TV3
2009	Nizam Kambing	Yes	No	No	Nizam	TV3
2010	Hantu Kek	Yes	Yes	No	Anuar	TV3
2010	Ku Yakin Berlaku	Yes	No	No	Ustaz Arif	Astro Oasis
2010	Fatimah Juling	Yes	No	No	Zack	Astro Prima
2011	Miah Oh Miah	Yes	No	No	Jamil	TV9
2014	Cinta Organik	Yes	No	No	Razlan	TV2

== Frequent collaborators ==
Frequent actor collaborations (2 or more films)
Actor/Actress	9 September (2007)	I'm Not Single (2008)	Jangan Tegur (2009)	Seru (2011)	Al-Hijab (2011)	Aku, Kau & Dia (2012)	Chantek (2012)	Cerita Kita (2013)	1 Lawan Satu (2013)	Highland Tower (2013)	Ustaz, Mu Tunggu Aku Datang (2013)	Muka Surat Cinta (2014)	Sniper (2014)	Jin (2014)	Kasut Ku Kusut (2014)	Cerita Hantu Malaysia (2014)	Apartment (2015)	Kecoh! Primadona Kena Hantu (2016)	Jangan Pandang Belakang 2: Aku Tahu Asal Usulmu (2024)	Dajal: Satu Malam Dipedajal (2025)	Nar'sata: Sekutu Setan (2026)	Total
Adibah Yunus										Yes			Yes									2
Along Eyzendy				Yes				Yes	Yes		Yes				Yes							5
Atikah Suhaime										Yes		Yes			Yes							3
Awal Ashaari		Yes		Yes																		2
Cat Farish		Yes																	Yes			2
Da'i Fuad																				Yes	Yes	2
Fadlan Hazim													Yes								Yes	2
Harun Salim Bachik						Yes								Yes								2
Hafidzuddin Fazil		Yes																	Yes			2
Kamal Adli																Yes	Yes	Yes				3
Kazar Saisi	Yes		Yes																			2
Kamarool Haji Yusoff															Yes	Yes		Yes				3
Khatijah Tan								Yes	Yes						Yes			Yes	Yes	Yes	Yes	7
Maimon Mutalib					Yes		Yes															2
Mikail Andre					Yes				Yes	Yes	Yes	Yes	Yes									6
Mawar Rashid																			Yes		Yes	2
Nisha Dirr				Yes			Yes															2
Nina Iskandar												Yes	Yes									2
Ruminah Sidek		Yes																	Yes			2
Ruzaidi Abdul Rahman									Yes		Yes											2
Pablo Amirul													Yes		Yes							2
Pekin Ibrahim					Yes	Yes																2
Rahhim Omar			Yes													Yes						2
Shima Anuar								Yes		Yes												2
Yana Samsudin	Yes							Yes														2

== Awards and nominations ==
Name of the award ceremony, year presented, award category, nominee(s) of the award and the result of the nomination
Awards	Year	Category	Recipient(s)	Result	Ref.
Anugerah Bintang Popular Berita Harian (Note: Pierre Andre has been banned from accepting any nominations after 2009.)	2007	Best Popular Actor	Jangan Pandang Belakang	Nominated	—N/a
Anugerah Skrin	2007	Best Actor	Jangan Pandang Belakang	Nominated	—N/a
Anugerah Skrin	2012	Anugerah Yasmin Ahmad	Pierre Andre	Won	—N/a
Festival Filem Malaysia	2006	Best Male Hope Actor	Salon	Nominated	—N/a
Festival Filem Malaysia	2007	Best Actor	Jangan Pandang Belakang	Nominated	—N/a
Festival Filem Malaysia	2009	Best Director	Jangan Tegur	Nominated	—N/a
