= Miss Universe Malaysia 2012 =

Malaysian beauty pageant

- Date: 10 November 2012
- Presenters: Will Quah
- Entertainment: Dayang Nurfaizah
- Venue: Sunway Pyramid Convention Centre, Subang Jaya, Selangor, Malaysia
- Broadcaster: Astro Hitz
- Entrants: 19
- Placements: 9
- Winner: Kimberley Leggett; Penang
- Congeniality: Jennifer Goh (Kuala Lumpur)

Miss Universe Malaysia 2012, the 46th edition of the Miss Universe Malaysia, was held on 10 November 2012 at Sunway Pyramid Convention Centre, Subang Jaya, Selangor. Kimberley Leggett of Penang was crowned by the outgoing titleholder, Deborah Priya Henry of Kuala Lumpur at the end of the event. She then represented Malaysia at the Miss Universe 2006 pageant in Las Vegas, United States.

== Results ==
Final Results	Contestants
Miss Universe Malaysia 2012	Penang – Kimberley Leggett
1st Runner–Up	Kuala Lumpur – Aileen Gabriella Robinson
2nd Runner–Up	Selangor – Boon Lu Xanne
3rd Runner–Up	Selangor – Juanita Ramayah
Top 9	Malacca – Stephanie Vincent; Perak – Magdeline Wang Sir Kar; Sarawak – Genevie Wan Anyie; Selangor – Aw Sim Li; Selangor – Cassandra Kiu Jian Qian

=== Judges ===
- Amir Luqman – Malaysian fashion designer
- Stephanie Kay – fashion designer
- Gillian Hung – fashion guru
- Andrew Tan – fashion icon
- Datin Josephine Fonseka – Miss Malaysia Universe 1970
- Bill Keith – fashion designer

== Contestants ==
From Top 30 Finalists down to Top 19 Grand Finalists.

No.	Contestant	Age	Height	Ethnicity	Hometown	Occupation	Notes
1	Aileen Gabriella Robinson	22	5 ft 9 inch in (175 cm)	Eurasian	Kuala Lumpur	Dance Academy Assistant Principal	1st Runner-up
2	Aw Sim Li	21	5 ft 8 inch in (173 cm)	Chinese	Selangor	Business & Commerce Student	Top 9
3	Boon Lu Xanne	24	5 ft 7 inch in (170 cm)	Chinese	Selangor	Freelance Writer/Model	2nd Runner-up
4	Cassandra Kiu Jian Qian	20	5 ft 7 inch in (170 cm)	Chinese	Selangor	International Business & Marketing Student	Top 9
5	Cheryl Ann Felix	24	5 ft 8 inch in (173 cm)	Indian	Penang	Writer	
6	Deviyah Daranee Radhakrishnan	20	5 ft 7½ inch in (172 cm)	Indian	Perak	Accounting Student	
7	Estelle Sim Jing Yi	20	5 ft 6 inch in (167 cm)	Chinese	Selangor	Psychology Student	
8	Evelyn Chew	23	5 ft 7 inch in (169 cm)	Chinese	Kedah	Electronic Engineering Student/Microwave & Communication Graduate	
9	Genevie Wan Anyie	24	5 ft 9½ inch in (176 cm)	Orang Ulu (Kayan)	Sarawak	Chemical Engineering Student	Top 9
10	Jascinta Kaur	19	5 ft 8½ inch in (174 cm)	Punjabi	Selangor	A-level Student/Accounting & Finance Graduate	
11	Jennifer Goh Rui Xian	19	5 ft 9 inch in (175 cm)	Chinese	Kuala Lumpur	Bsc(Hons) Real Estate Management & Development Student	Miss Congeniality
12	Juanita David Ramayah	20	5 ft 7 inch in (170 cm)	Eurasian	Selangor	Host/Communication & Media Management Student	3rd Runner-up
13	Kimberley Ann Estrop-Leggett	18	5 ft 10 inch in (178 cm)	Eurasian	Penang	Part Time Model/Economics & Business Student	Winner
14	Layka Sethuram	25	5 ft 7 inch in (170 cm)	Sikh	Kuala Lumpur	Director of Public Relation	
15	Magdeline Wang Sir Kar	19	5 ft 8½ inch in (174 cm)	Chinese	Perak	Business Commerce & Communication Student	Top 9
16	Stephanie Vincent	23	5 ft 9½ inch in (176 cm)	Chindian	Malacca	Human Resource Business Administration	Top 9
17	Suchitra Kaur Kumar	24	5 ft 6½ inch in (169 cm)	Punjabi	Kuala Lumpur	Tax Accountant	
18	Sugeeta Chandran	22	5 ft 7 inch in (170 cm)	Indian	Selangor	Psychology & Human Resource Student	
19	Zana Chin Mun Yee	22	5 ft 9 inch in (175 cm)	Chinese	Perak	Runway Model/Actress/Host/Talent	

1 Age during the contest

== Crossovers ==
Contestants who previously competed/appeared at other national beauty pageants:

Miss Universe Malaysia

- 2015 - Sugeeta Chandran (3rd Runner-up)

Miss Earth

- 2012 - Deviyah Daranee Radhakrishnan (Unplaced/Best Talent Group 3/2nd Runner-up Best National Costume)

Miss Earth Malaysia

- 2012 - Deviyah Daranee Radhakrishnan (Winner)

Miss Tourism International

- 2012 - Aileen Gabriella Robinson (Winner)

Miss Tourism Malaysia

- 2011 - Aileen Gabriella Robinson (Winner)

Miss Global International Malaysia

- 2011 - Genevie Wan Anyie (Finalists Top 16)

Miss Borneo Beautiful

- 2010 - Genevie Wan Anyie (1st Runner-up)

Seventeen Cover Girl

- 2008 - Juanita David Ramayah (Winner)
