= SMK Puteri =

- Seremban, Negeri Sembilan; Malaysia

Information
- Type: Government non-Boarding all-girls secondary school
- Motto: Kualiti teras kecemerlangan (Quality compulsory to excel)
- Established: 1993
- Grades: Form 1 - Form 5
- Enrollment: 1573
- Affiliations: Malaysia Ministry Of Education
- Abbreviation: Puteri
- Website: https://smkputeriseremban.blogspot.com/

SMK Puteri is an all-girl secondary school in Seremban, Malaysia. The school is widely known as Puteri.

== History ==
=== Japanese Occupation ===
During Japanese Occupation, the school is being used as shelter for sisters and orphanage from Taiping and Singapore. After Japanese left on 1 Oct 1945, the school is reopened and accept 800 new students and the school continue expand.

=== New school ===
SMK Puteri was built to replace the old and SMK Convent building. A plot of land near Taman AST was chosen to build a new school. On 8 July 1993, ground breaking ceremony was done by Menteri Besar Mohd Isa Samad.

Total cost for the school is RM5,305,170.00. The new school has seven blocks that consists of three levels, two blocks consists of two levels and two blocks consists of only one level.

== Curriculum ==
Results of PMR 2006

Percentage of pass in every subject

Subjects	2004	2005	2006
Malaysian language	99.7	100.0	100.0
English	99.3	100.0	99.1
History	99.0	99.7	99.4
Geography	100.0	100.0	99.7
Chinese Language	100.0	100.0	100.0
Tamil Language	100.0	100.0	100.0
Punjabi	100.0	100.0	100.0
Islam	98.5	100.0	98.7
Mathematics	97.6	98.4	98.7
Science	99.7	100.0	99.7
Kemahiran Hidup (Teknikal)	100.0	100.0	100.0
Kemahiran Hidup (Ekonomi Rumah Tangga)	100.0	99.1	99.2
Kemahiran Hidup (Perdagangan dan Keushawanan)	-	99.0	100.0

=== Enrollment ===
Student

Form	Malay	Chinese	Indian	Other	Total
Form 1	154	71	103	4	332
Form 2	149	68	110	7	334
Form 3	117	47	92	5	261
Form 4	125	68	113	48	354
Form 5	119	76	91	6	292
Total	664	330	509	70	1573

== Co-curricular ==
=== Hockey ===
- 2007
  - Kejohanan Hoki Tunas Cemerlang Kebangsaan – Champion
  - Karnival Sukan Sekolah-Sekolah Premier Kebangsaan – Runners-up
  - Anugerah Guru Berjasa Sukan Kementerian Pelajaran Malaysia
- 2008
  - Hoki KILAT 6's & 7's – Champion
  - Kejohanan Sukan-Sekolah Premier Zon Selatan – Runners-up
  - Kejohanan Hoki MSSM – 5th
  - Anugerah Jasamu DiKenang Jabatan Pelajaran Negeri Sembilan
- 2009
  - Kejohanan Hoki Juara-Juara Sekolah Kebangsaan – Fourth place & Anugerah Pemain Harapan
  - Kejohanan Sukan Institusi Pendidikan Malaysia (SIPMA) – Runners-up

== Notable alumni ==
- Aina Abdul - singer and actress.
- Vanessa Tevi - model and Miss Universe Malaysia 2015.
