= Teater Tun Siti Hasmah =

- Original language: Malay
- Written by: Erma Fatima
- Subject: Siti Hasmah
- Genre: Biographical

Premiere
- Date: November 9, 2012
- Place: Istana Budaya, Kuala Lumpur

Teater Tun Siti Hasmah is a Malaysian play directed by Erma Fatima and starring Lisa Surihani, Eja, Nazim Othman and Esma Danial. It depicts the life of Siti Hasmah, wife of Malaysian prime minister Mahathir Mohamad, concentrating largely on her role as a doctor and medical officer in her youth before becoming Malaysia's first lady. The play was produced in November 2012 at the Istana Budaya, Malaysia's "Palace of Culture" and main theatrical venue.

== Production delays ==
The production was originally slated for August 2012 but was faced with a series of challenges, including the withdrawal of the original director and several lead actors due to other contractual obligations.

== Reception ==
Siti Hasmah was in attendance at the opening night of the production and complimented the director afterwards on a "job well done".

== See also ==
- Mahathir, the Musical
