= Kimberley Leggett =

Malaysian beauty pageant titleholder (born 1993)

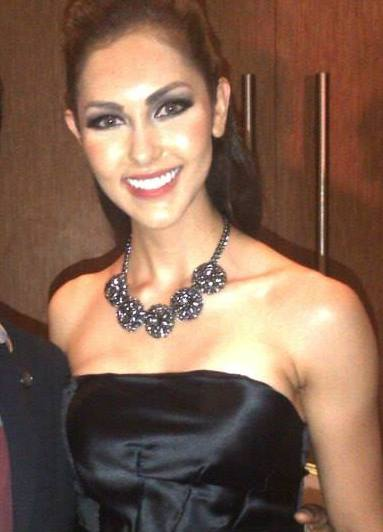
- Miss Universe Malaysia 2012 at Gala Night.
- Born: Kimberley Ann Estrop-Leggett; 23 March 1993 (age 33); Tanjung Bungah, Penang, Malaysia
- Education: University of Melbourne, Australia
- Height: 1.75 m (5 ft 9 in)
- Beauty pageant titleholder
- Title: Miss Universe Malaysia 2012
- Hair colour: Light Brown
- Eye colour: Hazel
- Major competitions: Miss Universe Malaysia 2012 (Winner); Miss Universe 2012 (Unplaced)

Kimberley Leggett (born 23 March 1993) is a Malaysian-British TV host and beauty pageant titleholder who was crowned Miss Universe Malaysia 2012. She represented Malaysia at Miss Universe 2012.

== Personal life ==
Leggett was born and raised in Tanjung Bungah, Penang, Malaysia to Jillian Estrop and Stephen Leggett. She is of Eurasian (British–Serani) descent. She is fluent in English, Malay and French as well as understands Hokkien and Cantonese.

She attended St. Christopher International Primary School and later went on to The International School of Penang (Uplands). She graduated with a bachelor's degree in Media Communications and Screen Studies from University of Melbourne, Australia in 2016.

== Miss Universe Pageant ==
=== Miss Universe Malaysia 2012 ===
Leggett was crowned Miss Universe Malaysia 2012 on 10 November 2011 at the Sunway Pyramid Convention Centre by Deborah Priya Henry. She also won some subsidiary titles which are Miss Photogenic, Best Bikini Body, and Nestle Fitnesse Award. As the winner, she was chosen to be the ambassadress for WWF Malaysia, Relay for Life and the Malaysian Nature Society amongst others. She worked as a model for various print ads, commercials and fashion shows and most notably appeared on the covers of NewMan Magazine, 260 Celsius and Shape Malaysia. In 2012, Leggett also worked as an emcee and hosted several shows for Malaysian International Fashion Week.

=== Miss Universe 2012 ===
She participated in the 2012 Miss Universe pageant on 19 December which was held in Las Vegas, United States. Although she was considered as a front runner by many pageant portals, she failed to secure a place in the Top 16.

== Post-Miss Universe 2012 ==
=== Hosting ===
Leggett co-hosted the Gala Night dinner of Miss Universe Malaysia 2018 alongside actor, Stephen Rahman-Hughes.

=== Other ventures ===
Leggett is currently focusing on a career as a personal trainer and nutrition coach after getting both her Certificate in Fitness and Precision Nutrition. She hopes to take up Physiotherapy in order to complement her practice in the fitness line. She has been a regular attendee of the Australian Health & Fitness Expo and has featured alongside The Biggest Loser Australia's Commando Steve in Women's Health & Fitness Magazine in 2015.

Awards and achievements
Preceded by Deborah Priya Henry	Miss Universe Malaysia; 2012	Succeeded by Carey Ng
