= Ahmad Idham =

Malaysian actor, director, producer

- أحمد إدهام
- Born: Ahmad Idham bin Ahmad Nadzri; January 1, 1974 (age 52); Alor Setar, Kedah, Malaysia
- Occupations: Actor, film director, screenwriter
- Years active: 1994–present
- Spouse: Jameah "Amy" Aziz (m. 1999)
- Children: 4
- Relatives: Khalid Nadzri (brother); Azman Nadzri (brother); Abby Nadzri (sister)

Ahmad Idham bin Ahmad Nadzri (born January 1, 1974) is a Malaysian actor, director and producer of television and film. He has directed over 30 films and nearly 10 telemovies to date. As an actor, he is best known for his role as Iskandar in the sitcom Spanar Jaya, which aired on ntv7 from 1999 to 2005. He was a former CEO of the National Film Development Corporation Malaysia (FINAS) from March 2019 to September 2021.

== Personal life ==
Idham was born and raised in Alor Setar, Kedah and is the eldest son in the family. He has two younger brothers, Khalid and Azman and a younger sister, Arbaiyah also known as Abby. Idham holds the bachelor's degree in Accountancy from the Universiti Teknologi MARA (UiTM).

In September 2020, he successfully completed his Doctor of Philosophy from Universiti Utara Malaysia and obtained a Doctor of Philosophy approval in the field of Management. He made a thesis entitled 'Malaysian Film Industry Ecosystem and Policy: A Study on the Internationalization of Malay Films.

Idham married Jameah "Amy" Aziz in 1999 and has four children. His oldest son, Ahmad Firdaus has had autism since birth. He established a special school named after his son, with an international system of education and therapy available to disabled people, named Eden Firdaus Special Need Center located in the Encorp Strand Mall, Kota Damansara.

== Filmography ==
=== Film ===
Year	Title	Credited As			Role	Notes
Year	Title	Actor	Director	Writer	Role	Notes
1995	KLU	Yes	No	No		Debut film appearances
2000	Senario Lagi	Yes	No	No	Doctor	
2000	Anaknya Sazali	Yes	No	No	Farid	
2002	Mr. Cinderella	Yes	Yes	No	Doctor	
2004	Tangkai Jering	Yes	No	No	Ramadhan	
2006	Tipah Tertipu The Movie	No	Yes	Yes	—	
2006	Remp-It	Yes	Yes	No		
2006	Tentang Bulan	No	Yes	No	—	
2007	Jangan Pandang Belakang	No	Yes	No	—	
2007	Impak Maksima	Yes	Yes	Yes	Rizwan	
2008	Congkak	Yes	Yes	No	Trader	
2008	I'm Not Single	Yes	No	No	Ahmad	
2008	Senario The Movie: Episode 1	No	Yes	No	—	
2008	Brainscan: Aku Dan Topi Ajaib	No	Yes	No	—	
2009	Syurga Cinta	No	Yes	No	—	
2009	Jangan Pandang Belakang Congkak	No	Yes	No	—	
2009	Senario The Movie Episod 2: Beach Boys	Yes	Yes	No	Abang Ghasidah	
2010	Adnan Sempit	No	Yes	No	—	
2010	Niyang Rapik	No	Yes	Yes	—	
2010	Semerah Cinta Stilleto	No	Yes	No	—	
2010	Jangan Pandang Belakang Congkak 2	No	Yes	No	—	
2010	Cuti-Cuti Cinta	No	Yes	No	—	
2010	Aku Masih Dara	No	Yes	No	—	
2010	Damping Malam	Yes	Yes	No	Wadi	
2011	Senjakala	No	Yes	Yes	—	
2011	Hantu Bonceng	No	Yes	Yes	—	
2012	Jangan Pandang-Pandang	No	Yes	Yes	—	
2012	Gerimis Mengundang	No	Yes	No	—	
2012	Mael Lambong	No	Yes	Yes	—	
2012	8 Jam	No	Yes	No	—	
2012	Apa Celop Toqq...	No	Yes	Yes	—	
2013	Gangster Celop	No	Yes	Yes	—	
2013	Lari	No	Yes	Yes	—	
2014	Tembus	No	Yes	Yes	—	
2014	Hantu Nan Sempit	No	Yes	Yes	—	
2015	Romeo Kota	Yes	No	Yes	ASP Jamal	
2015	Mat Moto	Yes	Yes	Yes	Iskandar	
2016	Harmonika	No	No	Yes	—	
2016	Mat Moto Otai	Yes	Yes	Yes	Iskandar	
2017	Minah Moto	No	Yes	Yes	—	
2017	Pencuri Hati Mr. Cinderella	Yes	Yes	Yes	Salman	
2018	Hantu Wangan	Yes	Yes	Yes	Himself	
2018	Qhaliq	Yes	No	Yes	Tuan Roslan	
2019	Kron	Yes	No	No	Professor Amri	
2024	Anak Perjanjian Syaitan 2	No	Yes	Yes	—	
2024	Saka Perawan	No	Yes	Yes	—	
2024	Reeza GTR	No	Yes	Yes	—	
2025	Sahak Gangster	No	Yes	Yes	—	
2025	Impak Maksima 2	No	Yes	Yes	—	

=== Television series ===
Year	Title	Credited As			Role	TV channel	Notes
Year	Title	Actor	Director	Writer	Role	TV channel	Notes
1996	Identiti	Yes	No	No		TV3	
1997	Cinta Antara Benua	Yes	No	No	Wahid	TV3	
1998	Cinderella	Yes	No	No	Salman	TV3	
1999	Romeo & Juliet	Yes	No	No	Romi	TV3	
1998–2005	Spanar Jaya	Yes	No	No	Iskandar	NTV7	
2003	Mengejar Pelangi	Yes	Yes	No		Astro Prima	
2005	Aku, Dia & Capetown	No	Yes	Yes		TV3	
2006	Kamasutra	Yes	No	No	Kamal	TV3	
2007	Kerana Cintaku Saerah	Yes	No	No		TV3	
2008	Ezora	No	Yes	Yes	—	TV3	
2008	Impak Maksima the Series	Yes	Yes	Yes	Rizwan	TV3	
2009	Rempit vs Impak Maksima The Series	No	Yes	Yes	—	TV3	
2011	Ustaz Amirul	No	No	Yes	—	TV3	
2012	Apa Celop!	No	Yes	Yes	—	TV3	
2012	Runtun Qalbu	No	No	Yes	—	TV3	
2016	Married Tapi Benci	No	No	Yes	—	TV3	
2016	Tak Beli Tak Cinta	No	Yes	Yes	—	TV3	
2018	Cinta Tiada Ganti	Yes	No	No	Borhan	Astro Prima	
2019	Spanar Jaya X	Yes	Yes	No	Iskandar	TV3	Episode: "Ini Harta Mat Rock Yang Punya"
2019	Spanar Jaya X	Yes	Yes	No	Iskandar	TV3	Episode: "Stiletto Merah"

=== Telemovie ===
Year	Title	Credited As			Role	TV channel
Year	Title	Actor	Director	Writer	Role	TV channel
1997	Dominan	Yes	No	No		TV3
1999	Minah Meenachi	Yes	No	No		TV3
2000	Pak Jalal T.J	Yes	No	No		TV3
2002	Tarantula	Yes	Yes	No		TV3
2003	Che Mat	Yes	No	No	Idris	TV3
2008	Rempit vs Impak Maksima	No	Yes	Yes	—	TV3
2009	Lagu Kita	No	Yes	Yes	—	Astro Citra
2009	2 Jiwa 1 Hati	Yes	Yes	Yes	Doctor	TV3
2010	Talkin Terakhir	No	Yes	No	—	TV3
2012	Apa Celop Raya	No	Yes	Yes	—	TV3
2013	Abang Long vs Kak Yong	No	Yes	Yes	—	TV3
2018	Ketupat Untuk Ariana	No	Yes	No	—	TV3
2018	Rezeki Tanpa Alamat	No	Yes	No	—	TV3
