= Miss Universe Malaysia 2013 =

- Date: 10 December 2012
- Presenters: Will Quah • Julie Woon
- Entertainment: Primo
- Venue: Shah Alam, Selangor, Malaysia
- Entrants: 17
- Placements: 8
- Winner: Carey Ng; Putrajaya

Miss Universe Malaysia 2013, the 47th edition of the Miss Universe Malaysia, was held on 10 December 2012 at Shah Alam, Selangor. Carey Ng of Putrajaya was crowned by the outgoing titleholder, Kimberley Leggett of Penang at the end of the event. She then represented Malaysia at the Miss Universe 2013 pageant in Moscow, Russia.

== Results ==
Final Results	Contestants
Miss Universe Malaysia 2013	Putrajaya – Carey Ng Sue Mun
1st Runner–Up	Selangor – Natalia Ng Mei Mei
2nd Runner–Up	Sabah – May Salitah Naru Kiob
3rd Runner–Up	Kuala Lumpur – Symren Kaur
Top 8	Kedah – Trisha Kuck; Kuala Lumpur – Samantha Katie James; Selangor – Marissa Majella Paramaraj; Selangor – Shareeta Selvaraj

== Contestants ==
The official Top 17 finalists of The Next Miss Universe Malaysia 2013.

No.	Contestant	Age	Height	Ethnicity	Represented	Notes
1	Angely Yew	25	5 ft 9 inch in (176cm)	Chinese	Kedah	
2	Carey Ng Sue Mun	23	5 ft 9 inch in (176cm)	Chinese	Putrajaya	Winner
3	Chammaine Tan	20	5 ft 8½ inch in (174cm)	Chinese	Penang	
4	Jassinta Mirasol	25	5 ft 9½ inch in (178cm)	Filipino-Dusun	Sabah	
5	Karissa Kara Simon	23	5 ft 9 inch in (176cm)	Eurasian	Sarawak	
6	Kelsey Rabindran	23	5 ft 7 inch in (170cm)	Indian	Selangor	
7	Leanndrea Anne Paramaraj	20	5 ft 8½ inch in (174cm)	Eurasian	Selangor	
8	Marissa Majella Paramaraj	22	5 ft 6 inch in (160cm)	Eurasian	Selangor	Top 8
9	May Salitah Naru Kiob	24	5 ft 6½ inch in (169cm)	Kadazan-Dusun	Sabah	2nd Runner-up
10	Naomi Chandrasegar	24	5 ft 9½ inch in (178cm)	Indian	Selangor	
11	Natalia Ng Mei Mei	24	5 ft 6½ inch in (168cm)	Chinese	Selangor	1st Runner-up
12	Rice Hing Zhi Yu	21	5 ft 7 inch in (170cm)	Chinese	Pahang	
13	Samantha Katie James	18	5 ft 6½ inch in (168cm)	Brazilian-Chinese	Kuala Lumpur	Top 8
14	Sarah Jade Schipper	25	5 ft 6½ inch in (168cm)	Eurasian	Perak	
15	Shareeta Selvaraj	22	5 ft 6½ inch in (168cm)	Indian	Selangor	Top 8
16	Symren Kaur	20	5 ft 6 inch in (167cm)	Indian	Kuala Lumpur	3rd Runner-up
17	Trisha Kuck	20	5 ft 6 inch in (167cm)	Eurasian	Kedah	Top 8

== Crossovers ==
Contestants who previously competed/appeared at other national beauty pageants:

Miss Universe

- 2017 - Samantha Katie James (Unplaced)

Miss Universe Malaysia

- 2017 - Samantha Katie James (Winner)

Asia's Next Top Model Season 3

- 2015 - Shareeta Selvaraj (14th placed)

ATV Miss Asia Malaysia

- 2014 - Leanndrea Anne Paramaraj (3rd Runner-up)

Miss Wilayah Kebaya

- 2013 - Leanndrea Anne Paramaraj (2nd Runner-up)

Miss World Harvest Festival

- 2012 - Karissa Kara Simon (2nd Runner-up)

Miss World Malaysia

- 2011 - May Salitah Naru Kiob (Finalists Top 25)

Miss Earth Malaysia

- 2010 - May Salitah Naru Kiob (Top 10)

Miss Earth Sabah

- 2010 - May Salitah Naru Kiob (Winner)
