= Samantha Katie James =

Winner of Miss Universe Malaysia 2017

- Born: Samantha Katie James; 2 November 1994 (age 32); Klang, Selangor, Malaysia
- Occupations: Actress, model, beauty queen
- Height: 1.68 m (5 ft 6 in)
- Beauty pageant titleholder
- Title: Miss Universe Malaysia 2017
- Years active: 2012–present
- Hair colour: Dark brown
- Eye colour: Brown
- Major competitions: Miss Universe Malaysia 2013 (Top 8); Miss Universe Malaysia 2017 (Winner) (Dethroned); Miss Universe 2017 (Unplaced)

Samantha Katie James (born 2 November 1994) is a Malaysian-Brazilian actress, model and beauty pageant titleholder who was crowned Miss Universe Malaysia 2017. She represented her country in Miss Universe 2017 in Las Vegas, Nevada.

== Personal life ==
Samantha Katie James is of Brazilian and Chinese descent, who hails from Klang, Selangor. James has never met her biological father, and her biological mother left her in foster care from the age of 2 to 17. She has worked as a model since the age of 17. James speaks fluent English and Malay, and she also understands Tamil and Mandarin Chinese. She is a pescatarian.

== Career ==
=== Acting ===
She was one of the main actors for Indonesian-Malaysian horror movie, "Kastil Tua" (2015) based on old abandoned Kellie's Castle. She also played a role in an upcoming Chinese international movie, "Huang", where she spoke fluent Chinese. In 2017, she acted in a Malaysian telemovie, "Wanita Terindah" along Fattah Amin and Fazura. The telemovie premiered at GSC Pavilion Kuala Lumpur and was aired on Astro First Channel beginning 2 November 2017.

== Controversy ==
On 1 June 2020, she was criticized for posting a story on her Instagram account targeted towards the Black Lives Matter movement and black community as a whole. It was suggested that they should see the murder of George Floyd as a challenge, and that they chose to be born in the United States as coloured people, in order "to learn a certain lesson". On the same day, a petition calling for the Miss Universe Malaysia committee to strip her off her crown and title garnered 21,000 signatures. Miss Universe Malaysia disavowed her comments. Her account on Instagram quickly became unverified following the controversy. However, the check mark reappeared after a few days.

On 24 August 2021, during the COVID-19 pandemic in Malaysia, she insisted on not wearing face coverings except when "undercover around annoying people", whilst further commenting on the use of face masks; remarking "I will never wear that f****ng diaper on my face."

== Pageantry ==
=== Miss Universe Malaysia 2013 ===
James competed in Miss Universe Malaysia 2013, and was placed in the top 8.

=== Miss Universe Malaysia 2017 ===
On her second attempt James was crowned as Miss Universe Malaysia 2017 on February 23, 2017, at The Majestic Hotel in Kuala Lumpur. She was crowned by outgoing titleholder Kiran Jassal.

=== Miss Universe 2017 ===
James competed in the Miss Universe 2017 Pageant at Las Vegas, Nevada, USA. She was considered one of the fan favorites to win, but she failed to make a placement.

== Filmography ==
=== Film ===
Year	Title	Language	Role	Notes
2015	Kastil Tua	Indonesian	Angie	Indonesia production
2017	Huang	Mandarin Chinese		Released only in China

=== Telemovie ===
Year	Title	Language	Role	Channel
2017	Wanita Terindah	Malay	Melissa	Astro First Ekslusif

Awards and achievements
Preceded by Kiran Jassal	Miss Universe Malaysia; 2017	Succeeded by Jane Teoh
