= I'm Not Single =

- Directed by: Pierre Andre
- Written by: Pierre Andre
- Produced by: David Teo
- Starring: Farid Kamil; Lisa Surihani; Awal Ashaari; Intan Ladyana; Ahmad Idham; David Teo
- Distributed by: Metrowealth Movies Production Sdn Bhd
- Release date: 24 July 2008 (Malaysia)
- Running time: 87 minutes
- Country: Malaysia
- Language: Malay
- Budget: MYR 1.5 million
- Box office: MYR 1,391,000

I'm Not Single (Malay: Aku Bukan Bujang) is a Malaysian Malay-language romantic comedy film directed by Pierre Andre starring Farid Kamil, Lisa Surihani, Awal Ashaari, Intan Ladyana, Ahmad Idham and David Teo. It was released on 24 July 2008.

== Synopsis ==
The movie tells of a young couple Maya and Adam who loathe each other because they are forced into an arranged marriage by their parents. Maya's ailing grandmother wants her to marry as soon as possible despite the fact that she already has a steady boyfriend, Dani. Dani and Maya love each other and had even planned to marry previously. With the arranged marriage looming closer, Dani has to try and figure out how to stop from Maya been taken away from him forever.

== Cast ==
- Farid Kamil as Adam
- Lisa Surihani as Maya
- Awal Ashaari as Dani
- Intan Ladyana as Lisa
- Ahmad Idham as Ahmad
- David Teo as David
- Dato' Jalaluddin Hassan as Borhan
- Fadilah Mansor as June
- Hafidzuddin Fazil as Ghani
- Aznah Hamid as Su
- Ruminah Sidek as Nenek
- Cat Farish as Psycho

== Awards ==
The film was nominated for two categories in the 21st Malaysian Film Festival, 2008.

Nominated

- Best Film - Nominated

Won

- Most Promising Actress - Lisa Surihani
