= Sabrina Beneett =

Malaysian beauty pageant titleholder

- Born: Sabrina Beneett; 10 March 1990 (age 36); Ipoh, Perak, Malaysia
- Height: 1.80 m (5 ft 11 in)
- Beauty pageant titleholder
- Title: Miss Selangor 2011; Miss Universe Malaysia 2014
- Hair colour: Dark Brown
- Eye colour: Dark Brown
- Major competitions: Miss Universe Malaysia 2014 (Winner); Miss Universe 2014 (Unplaced)

Sabrina Beneett is a Malaysian-Indian pageant titleholder who was crowned Miss Universe Malaysia 2014 held at Setia City Convention Centre in Setia Alam. She represented Malaysia at the Miss Universe 2014 in Florida and ended up did not make it to the semifinalists round, this is the 44th consecutive year Malaysia did not placed in Miss Universe pageant.

== Early life ==
Sabrina Beneett is a freelance model who hails from the state of Perak. She is a Malaysian Indian. She studied psychology and communication.

== See also ==
- Miss Universe 2014

Awards and achievements
Preceded by Carey Ng	Miss Universe Malaysia; 2014	Succeeded by Vanessa Tevi
