= Lisa Surihani =

Malaysian actress (born 1986)

Yang Berbahagia Datin Hajjah Lisa Surihani
- ليسا سوريهاني
- Born: Lisa Surihani binti Mohamed; March 23, 1986 (age 40); Kuala Lumpur, Malaysia
- Education: Aberystwyth University
- Occupations: Actress; Commercial; Model; Host Television; Producer
- Years active: 1997–present
- Spouse: Datuk Yusry Abdul Halim (m. 2012)
- Children: 3

Lisa Surihani Mohamed (/ˈlisɑːˈsʊrihɑːni/; Lee-sah-Soo-ree-ha-nee), born 23 March 1986) is a Malaysian actress, model, television host and commercial model. Starting her entertainment career in 1997, at the age of 11, she has appeared in feature films and television shows as well as TV commercials. She has received the Malaysian Film Festival for Best Actress. Her films include Goodbye Boys (2006) I'm Not Single (2008), Kapoww!! (2010), SAM: Saya Amat Mencintaimu (2012) and Ular (2013).

Lisa married singer-actor Yusry KRU in 2012 and they have three children. In February 2017, she was appointed as the Goodwill Ambassador of UNICEF Malaysia.

== Early life ==
Lisa Surihani was born in Kuala Lumpur to a family of Bugis with distant Chinese, Arab and Indian ancestry. She studied in Sekolah Sri Inai during her primary and secondary years. She studied law at the Help University College and Aberystwyth University in Wales, United Kingdom.

== Career ==
Lisa started out in an Ovaltine commercial at 11. Some of her earliest TV appearances were Gergasi on TV1 and later Ayah Kami. She first acted in films Goodbye Boys and recently Sekali Lagi with Malaysian actor Shaheizy Sam. She was awarded Best Actress in a Comedy at the Anugerah Lawak Warna. She also received the Best Actress award at the 23rd Malaysian Film Festival.

In 2012, she starred in local films Lagenda Budak Setan 2, Cyber X: Ancaman Penggodam and Istanbul Aku Datang. She was given the Best Actress award at the 23rd Malaysian Film Festival and Most Popular Film Actress at Anugerah Bintang Popular Berita Harian.

Lisa's stage debut came in the November 2012 production of Teater Tun Siti Hasmah, a biographical sketch of first lady Siti Hasmah Mohamad Ali.

== Personal life ==
Lisa Surihani married Malaysian singer and actor Yusry Abdul Halim, of KRU fame, in 2012. The couple welcomed a daughter in September 2015. In November 2016, they announced that they were expecting their second child. On 23 April 2017, Lisa gave birth to her second child, a boy. They had their third child, a son, on 23 June 2021.

On 11 January 2013, Lisa lost approximately RM50,000 in savings due to her ATM card being used by other individuals without her consent. She and her mother Siti Amirah Ahmad lodged a police report.

== Filmography ==
=== Feature films ===
| Year | Title | Role | Notes |
|---|---|---|---|
| 2006 | Goodbye Boys | Lara | Feature film debut |
| 2008 | I'm Not Single | Maya Borhan | |
| 2009 | Jangan Pandang Belakang Congkak | Mustika Sudirman | |
| 2010 | V3 Samseng Jalanan | Kamsah | |
| 2010 | Semerah Cinta Stilleto | Siti Laila/Stilla | |
| 2010 | Lagenda Budak Setan | Ayu Sidaratul Dursina | |
| 2010 | Kapoww!! | Siti Nurhasnita | |
| 2010 | Zoo | Shila | |
| 2010 | Jangan Pandang Belakang Congkak 2 | Mustika Sudirman | |
| 2011 | Sekali Lagi | Sheila | |
| 2011 | Ombak Rindu | Mila Amylia Rashdan | |
| 2011 | Papa, I Love You | Elly | |
| 2012 | Lagenda Budak Setan 2: Katerina | Ayu | |
| 2012 | SAM (Saya Amat Mencintaimu) | Lisa | |
| 2012 | Istanbul Aku Datang | Dian | |
| 2012 | The Smurfs | Smurfette (voice) | Malay version |
| 2013 | Ular | Myra | |
| 2014 | Despicable Me 2 | Lucy Wilde (voice) | Malay version |
| 2014 | Lagenda Budak Setan 3: Kasyah | Ayu | |
| 2014 | Dendam Orang Mati | Lena | |
| 2014 | Manisnya Cinta Di Cappadocia | Izelea | |
| 2015 | Suamiku, Encik Perfect 10 | Aleeya Azmeen | |
| 2015 | Cicakman 3 | Linda | |
| 2015 | Sinaran | Shila | |
| 2018 | Wheely | Bella (voice) | |
| 2023 | Sumpahan Malam Raya | Herself | |

=== Television series ===
| Year | Title | Role | TV channel | Notes |
|---|---|---|---|---|
| 2002 | Gergasi | | TV1 | |
| 2004 | Ayah Kami | | TV1 | |
| 2008 | Mertua vs Menantu | | Astro Prima | |
| 2009–2010 | Jangan Pandang Belakang Congkak The Series | Mustika Sudirman | Astro Warna | |
| 2010 | 3 Janda | Intan | Astro Prima | |
| 2010 | Tudung Ekspres | Erin | Astro Ria | |
| 2011 | Adamaya | Maya | TV3 | |
| 2012 | Mana Hilangnya Juwita | Anggun | Astro Ria | |
| 2012 | Oh My English! | Herself | Astro TVIQ | |
| 2018 | Alamatnya Cinta | | Astro Ria | Cameo |
| 2020 | Pelindung Seorang Puteri | Rose | Astro Ria | |
| 2021 | Ramadan Pertama Edi | | Astro Ria | As producer |
| 2024 | Kiblat ke Syurga | Dr. Khadijah | Astro Ria | |

=== Television ===
| Year | Title | Role | TV channel | Ref. |
|---|---|---|---|---|
| 2008 | Down Memory Lane | Host | TV1 | |
| 2010 | MyEG Extra Time Bring It! | Host | ESPN | |
| 2010 | Mari Menari | Host | Astro Ria | |
| 2011 | Siti: Hiburan & Inspirasi | Guest | Astro Ria | |
| 2013 | HBO Sentral | Host | HBO Asia | |
| 2014 | Pasport Cinta | Herself | TV2 | |
| 2016–2017 | e-bu Babypedia | Host | Astro Ria | |
| 2022 | Sakinah Mawaddah Warahmah | Host | Astro Oasis | |

=== Theater ===
| Year | Title | Role |
|---|---|---|
| 2012 | Teater Tun Siti Hasmah | Siti Hasmah Mohd Ali |

=== Telemovie ===
| Year | Title | Role | TV channel |
|---|---|---|---|
| 2009 | Ponti Anak Remaja | | Astro Ria |
| 2010 | Azan | Rosa | TV1 |
| 2011 | S3RAM | Suhaila | Astro Ria |
| 2013 | Mamma Mamma Mia! | Leeya | Astro Ria |
| 2014 | Jawa Taiko | Alisa | Astro Prima |
| 2014 | Strawberi & Karipap: Sesat Kat Paris | Sofea | Astro First Exclusive |
| 2016 | Syahadah Yang Hilang | Zubaidah | Astro Citra |
| 2017 | Kontena Ana | Ana | Astro Citra |
| 2018 | Aku Posmen | Latifah | Astro Citra |
| 2019 | Geng | Mariam | Astro First Exclusive |
| 2019 | Dah Mati Pun Cantik | Dr Rina | Astro Citra |
| 2020 | 6 Hari | Suzi | Astro Citra |
| 2020 | Aku Posmen, Kau Latifah, Dia Joseph | Latifah | Astro Citra |

== Videography ==
Music video
| Year | Title | Singer |
|---|---|---|
| 2004 | "Milikku" | Zahid AF2 ft Cat Farish |

== Endorsements ==
| Year | Products | Notes | Sources |
|---|---|---|---|
| 1997 | Ovaltine | | |
| 2002 | Johnson & Johnson | | |
| 2002 | McDonald's | | |
| 2004 | Hotlink Siti Nurhaliza Fantasia Tour | with Siti Nurhaliza, Nadiya Nisaa and Sazzy Falak | |
| 2004 | Rexona | | |
| 2004 | MyEG | | |
| 2007 | Lip Ice | | |
| 2007 | Maggi Cukup Rasa | | |
| 2010 | Garnier | | |
| 2010 | Honda Icon | | |
| 2012 | Freshlook | | |
| 2012 | DiGi Easy Prepaid | | |
| 2012 | I Choose Malaysia campaign ads | | |
| 2013 | Marigold Peel Fresh | | |
| 2013 | WeChat | with Shaheizy Sam | |
| 2014 | Sofy BodyFit | | |
| 2015 | Courts | with Harith Iskander | |
| 2015 | Oral-B | | |
| 2015 | Body Shop | | |

== Awards and nominations ==
| Year | Awards | Category | Nominated work | Result |
|---|---|---|---|---|
| 2008 | 21st Malaysian Film Festival | Most Promising Actress | I'm Not Single | Won |
| 2010 | 23rd Malaysian Film Festival | Best Actress | Lagenda Budak Setan | Won |
| 2010 | Anugerah Bintang Popular Berita Harian | Most Popular Film Actress | —N/a | Won |
| 2012 | Anugerah Skrin | Best Supporting Actress For Film | Ombak Rindu | Won |
| 2013 | Anugerah Lawak Warna | Best Comedy Actress For Film | Istanbul Aku Datang | Won |
| 2014 | Festival Filem Malaysia | Best Actress | Istanbul Aku Datang | Won |
| 2015 | Anugerah Skrin | Best Actress For Film | Dendam Orang Mati | Won |

Awards and achievements
| Preceded by Natasha Hudson | Malaysian Film Festival- Promising Actress; 2008 | Succeeded by Jaclyn Victor |
