= Jangan Pandang Belakang =

- Directed by: Ahmad Idham
- Written by: Ahmad Idham; Pierre Andre
- Produced by: David Teo
- Starring: Pierre Andre; Intan Ladyana; Khatijah Tan; Ruminah Sidek
- Cinematography: Indra Che Muda
- Edited by: Ahmad Mustadha
- Music by: Brian Ng
- Distributed by: Metrowealth Movies Production Sdn. Bhd.
- Release date: 5 April 2007 (Malaysia)
- Running time: 99 minutes
- Country: Malaysia
- Language: Malay
- Box office: MYR 6.33 million

Jangan Pandang Belakang (English: Don't Look Behind) is a 2007 Malaysian Malay-language supernatural horror film directed by Ahmad Idham starring Pierre Andre, Intan Ladyana, Khatijah Tan and Ruminah Sidek.

== Plot ==
The movie opens with an unnamed elder being exorcised by an imam during the night. Although the spirit had been exorcised, the man does not make it through the night. The imam orders a bottle be discarded into the sea,

Darma (Pierre Andre) is traumatised by the mysterious death of his fiancée, Rose (Intan Ladyana) who had killed herself. Unknown to him, Rose had been haunted by a malicious spirit which they had brought to her home after picking up a small jar found washed up at the beach. Apparently, the spirit had been imprisoned and was inadvertently released by the couple.

At her home, after her death, before leaving Darma had taken the small jar with him, and with it, the malignant spirit.

Not satisfied with why Rose had suddenly killed herself, Darma decides to investigate the case with the help of Rose's twin sister, Seri, (also played by Intan Ladyana). As they probe into the death, a series of strange occurrences start to unravel, leaving Darma in a disturbed state of mind that affects his life and career. When he is advised to take a week's break from work, he returns to his village to rest. Unknown to him, he is only getting closer to solving his fiancée's death and the truth behind the strange happenings.

It was Darma's senile grandmother who could see the ghost and had unwittingly invited the spirit into the house. In Malay belief, certain spirits cannot enter the house unless invited in. The ghost ends up possessing Darma after tormenting the family, however, the ghost is successfully exorcised by the resident Imam, putting an end to the Saka which had been haunting them.

== Cast ==
- Pierre Andre as Darma
- Intan Ladyana as Rose & Seri
- Khatijah Tan as Mak Lang (Darma's aunt)
- Ruminah Sidek as Opah (Grandmother)
- Rio Elani as Lin
- Dian P. Ramlee as Rose mother's / Seri
- Hafidzuddin Fazil as Tok Imam
- Kamarool Haji Yusoff as Pak Megat
- Jalaluddin Hassan as Daim (special appearance)
- Cat Farish as Bus Driver (special appearance)

A stuntman Nazari Abu Bakar died during the shooting of the film. The unexpected thing happen when the cameraman try to take a shot at the location, suddenly capture a mystery entity. That photo are being use as a teaser poster of this film.

== Reception ==
The film was released on 5 April 2007 on 51 theatres across Malaysia, Indonesia, Brunei, and Philippines. On its opening weekend, the film debuted at number 1 in Malaysia, grossing $433,589 in 55 theatres with an average $7,883 per theatre. In Philippines, the film debuted at number 9 grossing $19,748 in 20 theatres with an average $987 per theatre. In Singapore, the film grossed $91,030 on its first premiere, ranking at number 2 in 5 theatres with an average $18,206 per theatre. Overall, the film was an international success, grossing RM6.33 million, becoming the highest-grossing film of all time in Malaysia.

== Awards and nominations ==
20th Malaysian Film Festival, 2007
Won

- Box Office Film

Nominated

- Best Actor – Pierre Andre
- Best Actress in a Supporting Role – Ruminah Sidek
- Best Cinematography – Indra Che Muda Redzuan
- Best Editor – Ahmad Mustadha
