= Mahathir, the Musical =

2010 Malaysian musical

Mahathir, the Musical is a Malaysian musical which was staged at Istana Budaya in Kuala Lumpur, Malaysia, from September 24 to October 4, 2010. The musical centers around former Malaysian Prime Minister Mahathir Mohamad. The musical received an overwhelming response from the public even before its debut.

== Synopsis ==
The musical follows the life of Mahathir, tracing his rural background, Malaysia's independence from Britain in 1957, and Mahathir's success when he entered political office in the 1960s. It also portrays Mahathir as a visionary, tracing his journey from his childhood days of selling balloons to earn extra pocket money, all the way to his rise to the country's highest office in 1981, and his time in office before retiring in 2003.

== Cast ==
Role	Actor
Mahathir	Esma Daniel
Anwar Ibrahim	
Siti Hasmah Mohamad Ali	

== See also ==
- Teater Tun Siti Hasmah
