= Awal Ashaari =

Malaysian actor and television presenter

- أول أشاعري
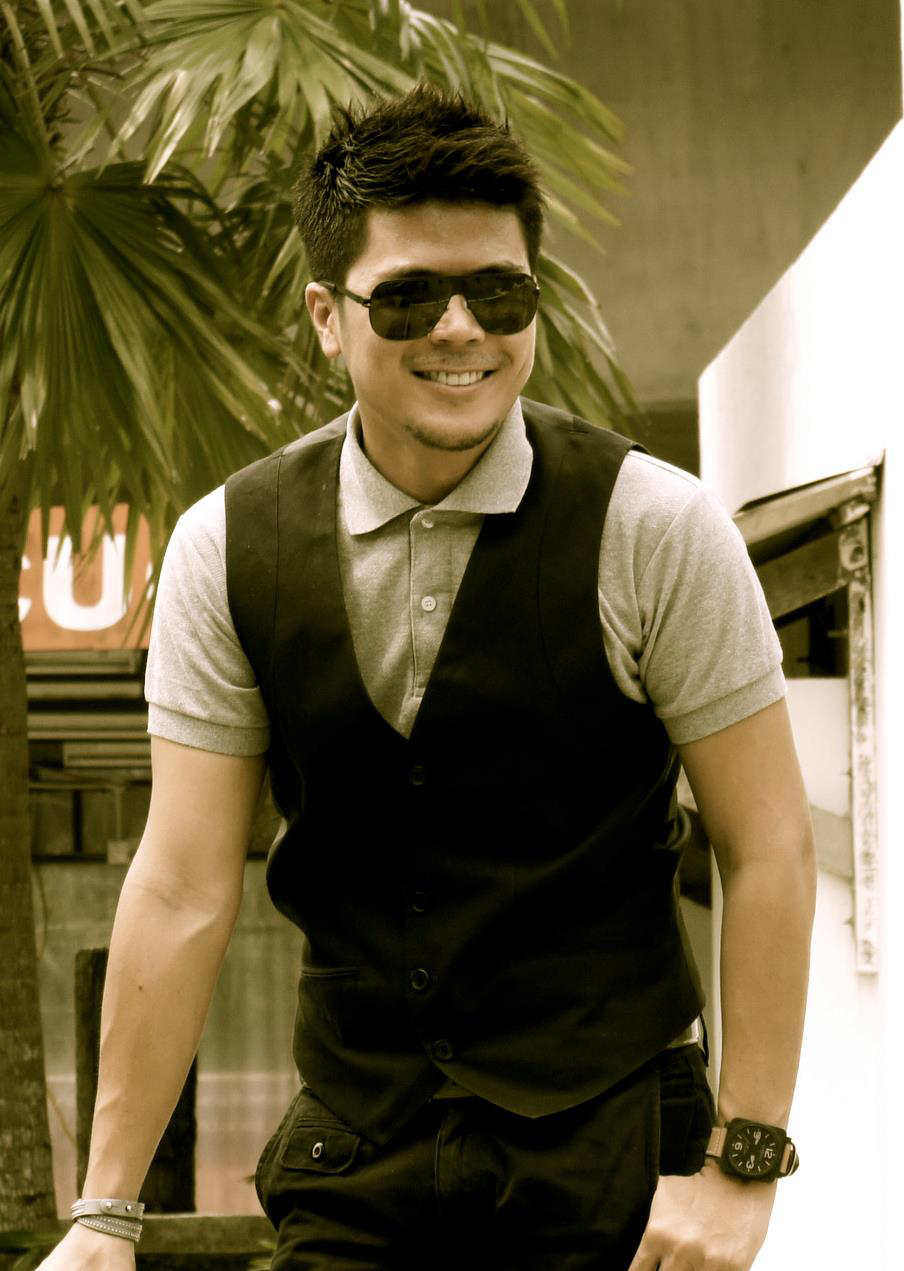
- Born: Ahmad Awaluddin bin Ashaari; 6 August 1981 (age 44); Kampung Baru, Kuala Lumpur, Malaysia
- Occupations: Actor; Host Television; Model
- Years active: 2004–present
- Height: 180 cm (5 ft 11 in)
- Spouse: Scha Alyahya (m. 2012)
- Children: 2

Ahmad Awaluddin "Awal" bin Ashaari (born 6 August 1981) is a Malaysian actor, model and TV host.

== Early life and career ==
Awal Ashaari was born in Kampung Baru, Kuala Lumpur, Malaysia. He holds a diploma from Universiti Teknologi MARA in mass communications.

He then went on to work at Leo Burnett advertising, where its executive creative director Yasmin Ahmad is also a filmmaker, as an account executive, but felt he did not belong there. He then went on to become a newsreader for 8TV's Twenty Hundred News for eight months in 2003. It was also at that time was the first season of Malaysian Idol competition and Awal managed to reach the final 30 cut-off. Later in 2004, FCUK had a model search competition and he was selected.

Besides modelling and fashion spreads, Awal hosts Beat TV on Astro Ria. He has also been involved in numerous Malay dramas such as Impak Maksima, Noktah Erna and Cinta Medik. Previously, he was the host of One in a Million, a Malaysian reality singing competition show. He was also the host for a reality TV show on Astro Ria, Mari Menari season 1 with Lisa Surihani.

== Personal life ==
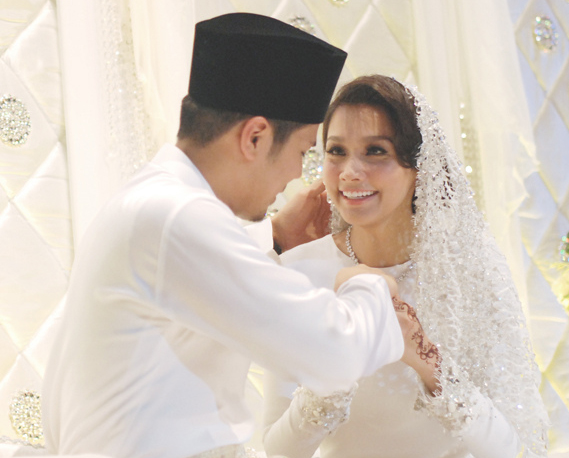
Awal on his wedding day with Scha

Awal married actress Scha Alyahya on 4 May 2012. Lara Alana is his first child with Scha, born on 22 July 2014. His second child, another daughter, was born on 12 February 2021 and bestowed the name Lyla Amina.

== Filmography ==
=== Film ===
Year	Title	Role	Notes
2007	Diva	Jay	Debut film appearances
2007	Impak Maksima	Ayie	
2008	Apa Kata Hati?	Riezman	
2008	I'm Not Single	Dani	
2009	Maut	Fendi	
2009	Syurga Cinta	Irham	
2010	Niyang Rapik	Amir	
2011	Seru	Zed	Cameo

=== Television series ===
Year	Title	Role	TV channel
2004	Impian IIlyana (Season 1)	Rizal	NTV7
2007	Seribu Erti	Ehsan	
2007	Impian Illyana (Season 2)	Rizal	TV9
2007	Cinta Medik	Khai	TV9
2007	Misi XX Ray (Season 2)	Awaluddin	TV3
2008	Kahit Isang Saglit	Amir Mohammad	TV2
2008	Impak Maksima the Series	Ayie	TV3
2008	Haryati 2		TV2
2008	3R	Mark	TV3
2008	Puteri (Season 4)	Helmi	TV3
2009	Cinderella Blues	Azhar b. Johar	TV3
2009	Embun Mutiara	Roni	TV3
2010	Noktah Erna	Syamsul	TV3
2013	Sedetik Cinta	Hakimi	TV3
2018	Dapur Kongsi	Remy	NTV7

=== Television ===
Year	Program	Role	TV channel	Notes
2007	Sensasi	Host	TV3	with Intan Suraya
2010–2017, 2020–2021	Melodi	Host	TV3	with Janna Nick
2021	Festival AJL	Host	TV3	
2021	Borak Kelamin	Host	Astro Ria	with Elly Mazlein
2021	Spotlight Tanpa Prejudis	Host	Finas Malaysia	
2022	Anugerah Industri Muzik 23	Host	Astro Ria	with Sherry Alhadad & Azad Jasmin
2022	Anugerah Seri Angkasa 2022	Host	TV2	with Jeed Zulkefli
2022	FFM32	Host	TV2	with Sarimah Ibrahim
