= Kiran Jassal =

Malaysian model and beauty pageant titleholder (born 1996)

- ਕਿਰਨ ਜੱਸਲ
- Born: Kiranmeet Kaur Baljeet Singh Jassal; 13 March 1996 (age 30); Subang Jaya, Selangor, Malaysia
- Education: International Medical University
- Height: 5 ft 8.5 in (1.74 m)
- Beauty pageant titleholder
- Title: Miss Universe Malaysia 2016
- Years active: 2016-present
- Hair colour: Brown
- Eye colour: Brown
- Major competitions: Miss Universe Malaysia 2016 (Winner); Miss Universe 2016 (Unplaced)

Kiranmeet Kaur Jassal (Punjabi: ਕਿਰਨ ਜੱਸਲ, romanized: Kirana jasala; born 13 March 1996), commonly known as Kiran Jassal, is a Malaysian Indian model and beauty pageant titleholder who was crowned Miss Universe Malaysia 2016. She represented her country at Miss Universe 2016 in Manila, Philippines.

== Personal life ==
Jassal is the youngest in a family of four. Her mother, lawyer Ranjit Kaur, was Mrs Malaysia World 2015 winner while her elder sister, Dr. Ranmeet Jassal was the titleholder of Miss Grand Malaysia 2016. She plans to eventually study dentistry. Jassal stated in July 2016 that she would not give up on dentistry, "regardless of anything". Jassal aspires to set up her own orthodontic practice in the future. She is of Punjabi descent and a Sikh.

== Career ==
=== Pageantry ===
==== Miss Universe Malaysia 2016 ====
Jassal was crowned Miss Universe Malaysia 2016 on 30 January 2016 at the Palace of the Golden Horses Hotel, Seri Kembangan, Malaysia. She was crowned by outgoing titleholder, Miss Universe Malaysia 2015, Vanessa Tevi. Besides the main title, she was also awarded the "Miss My Dentist Winning Smile" subsidiary title.

==== Miss Universe 2016 ====
Jassal represented Malaysia at the Miss Universe 2016 and got into the Top 12 for Best in National Costume award, alongside Miss Venezuela and the winner Miss Myanmar. She represented Malaysia using a costume inspired by the Petronas Twin Towers. The National Costume was made by Malaysian leading fashion designer Rizman Ruzaini, who also designed her evening gown.

=== Modelling ===
Jassal walked for the 2016 L'Oréal Professionnel Colour For Life hair fashion charity event alongside Deborah Henry and supermodel, Amber Chia.

== Humanitarian work ==
Jassal is one of the celebrity ambassadors for Malaysia AIDS Foundation. In 2018, Jassal was appointed as Petron Security Ambassador to spread awareness of the Royal Malaysia Police's Go-To-Safety-Point (GTSP) initiative.

Awards and achievements
Preceded by Vanessa Tevi	Miss Universe Malaysia; 2016	Succeeded by Samantha Katie
