= Istana Budaya =

Opera house in Kuala Lumpur, Malaysia

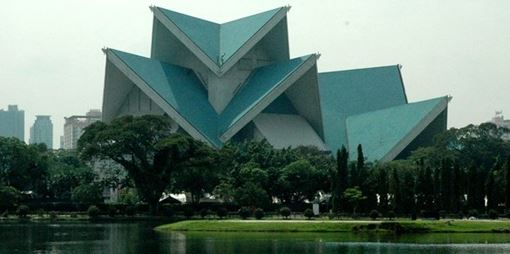
- View from across the lake
- Interactive map of Istana Budaya
- Location: Kuala Lumpur, Malaysia
- Coordinates: 3.1744°N 101.7037°E
- Owner: City of Kuala Lumpur
- Seating type: hall seats and box seats
- Capacity: 1,408 seats
- Type: Concert hall, Opera house
- Public transit: PY18 Hospital Kuala Lumpur MRT station

Construction
- Built: 1995
- Opened: 1999
- Architect: Muhammad Kamar Ya'akub

Website
- Official website Istana Budaya on Facebook

The Istana Budaya or also known as the Palace of Culture, is Malaysia's main venue for all types of theatre including musical theatre, operetta, classical concerts and opera from local and international performances. It is located in the heart of Kuala Lumpur city, next to the National Art Gallery.

== History ==
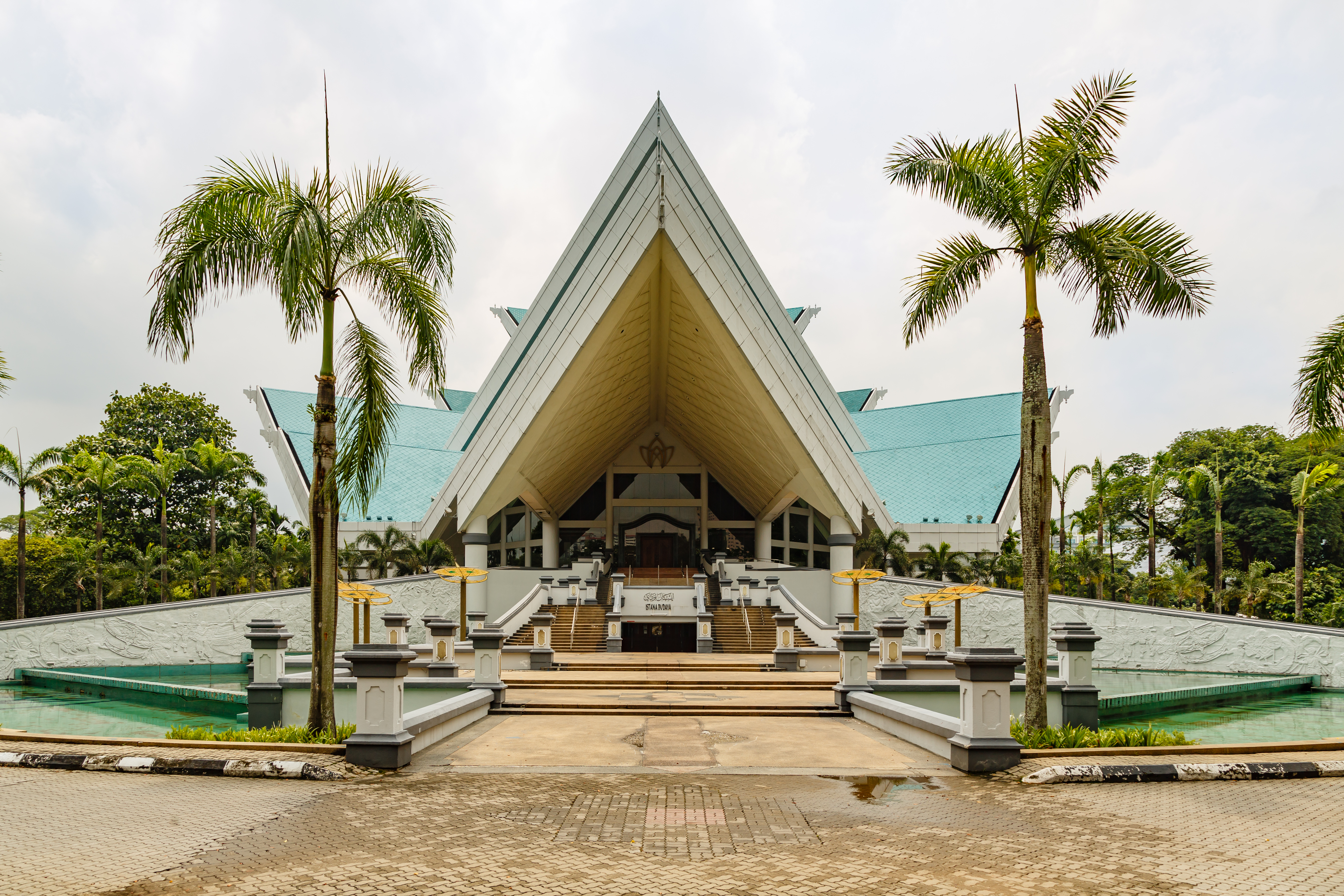
Main entrance

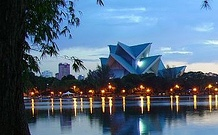
Istana Budaya at night

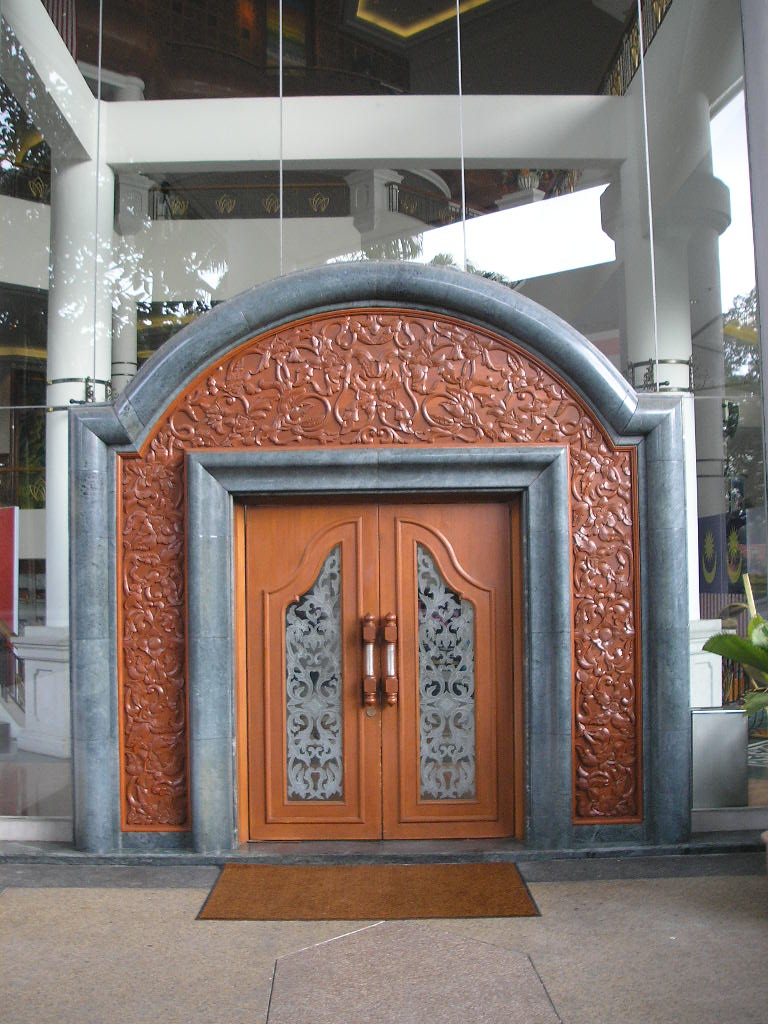
One of the doors with traditional Malay motifs

The idea of this theatre began with the proposal in 1964 to establish a cultural centre. The construction work began in 1995 and was completed three years later. It was built at a cost of RM210 million with a theatre floor area of 21,000 m² as part of the 54,400 m² cultural complex. The Istana Budaya was officially opened in 1999 by the Prime Minister of Malaysia, Mahathir Mohamad. Upon completion, the former national theatre, Panggung Negara was relocated to this new building. Istana Budaya is the home of the Residence Artists (Dance); the National Symphony Orchestra (NSO) and the Orchestra Traditional Malaysia (OTM).

Istana Budaya logo

The Istana Budaya theatre hall Panggung Sari, with its unique design of royal boxes inspired by the windows of the traditional Rumah Melayu or Malay house, can accommodate an audience of up to 1,408 people.

Istana Budaya aims to raise the standards of performing arts, develop artistic excellence in theatre, popularise high-quality theatre productions and develop a higher sense of artistic appreciation.

From September 24 to October 4, 2010, Istana Budaya held Mahathir, the Musical.

== Architecture ==
The building was designed by the local architect firm, ADC ARCHITECT SDN. The inspiration for the design is based on a traditional moon kite in flight. The turquoise folds on the roof and the intricate design of the foyer are just two of the interesting features of the building. Istana Budaya's architecture has intrigued experts and academics.

The main building takes the shape of the sirih junjung, a traditional arrangement or a present made of betel leaves used during Malay wedding and welcoming ceremonies. As in a traditional Malay house, the building is divided into three areas:

- The serambi (lobby and foyer)
- The rumah ibu (main house) as the auditorium
- The rumah dapur (kitchen) as the stage and rehearsal hall.

The interior was constructed using local resources such as Langkawi's marble and high-quality tropical wood for the doors crafted by hand to shape flowers and leaf motifs. The verdant carpets in the entrance hall and lobby feature cempaka flower and the banyan tree, inspired by traditional Malay opera or Mak Yong.

In the auditorium, there are royal boxes on each side, patterned after the windows of a Malay house. The entrance to the theatre, too, replicates a palace's main hall, or the Balairong Seri and is said to be modelled after one in Malacca.

The theatre lobby on the third floor extends the influence of Malay culture, taking the shape of the rebana ubi or traditional drum. The auditorium itself seats about 1,408 people, including 788 in the stalls on the first floor, 328 in the grand circle on the second floor and 292 people in the upper circle. The orchestra pit, when it is not in use, can take in 98 people.

Istana Budaya has wheelchair facilities, including a ramp into the foyer, a lift with easy-to-reach buttons and an area designated for the handicapped. Restrooms for the disabled are also found at both the stalls and grand circle areas. Additionally, there is also a costume gallery featuring clothes from Malay traditional theatre. The costumes are from Bangsawan, Mak Yong, Ajat Bebunuh, Layang Emas and Bambarayon performances, among others.

== Performances ==
Istana Budaya has staged many notable opera performances including The Merry Widow, Tosca, La Bohème, Turandot and Carmen accompanied by the National Symphony Orchestra and chorus. It has also become the main venue for the successful local musical production, Puteri Gunung Ledang.

== Music directors / conductors ==
- Mustafa Fuzer Nawi (1999 – ) Music Director / Chief conductor

== See also ==
- List of concert hall in Malaysia
- List of opera houses
