= Farah Khan (businesswoman) =

Singaporean businesswoman

- Born: Singapore
- Occupation: Entrepreneur
- Known for: High end fashion design and creation

Farah Khan is a Singaporean entrepreneur, the founder of the luxury retail fashion boutique Melium Group and the creative director of the Farah Khan label. In 2011, The Star listed her as one of the top 100 memorable women in Malaysia. In 2006, Khan received the Italian Star of Solidarity Order (The Ordine della Stella della Solidarietà Italiana) from the Italian Ambassador to Malaysia Alessandro Busacca in conjunction with his country's national day. This award honours foreign personalities who strengthen ties between Italy and foreign countries in terms of culture, language, humanitarian actions.

== Personal life ==
Khan is the daughter, the third of five siblings, of a former diamond merchant and a lady who owned a Shanghainese-style fashion boutique called Le Bijou in Singapore. She learned the art of tailoring from her mother who made fashion dresses. Khan claims that she sees fashion as a form of self-expression and a means to display her creativity.

At 27, Khan divorced her first husband and remarried with Singaporean business tycoon Akbar Khan based in Kuala Lumpur. She adopted the Muslim name Farah Khan and joined her husband in the Malaysian capital. She stayed home for about a year and decided to resume her activities in the fashion industry.

Khan has three children: a 35-year-old son and a 33-year-old daughter from her first marriage. She also has another son, aged 23, from her second marriage. Khan has since been in a long-term relationship with Greek businessman Dimitri Pantazaras, 58, a real estate developer. She spends time with charity causes for children with special needs. In the past, Khan battled stomach cancer and survived against odds.

== Career ==
Khan's career is better described through her achievements and creations in the fashion industry. Since 1974, she founded 3 luxury boutiques and a group. Khan is recognized in Malaysia as a style icon among notable designers including Jimmy Choo and Bernard Chandran.

=== The Link ===
In 1974, Khan set up The Link boutique along Orchard Road in Singapore at the Mandarin Hotel. It's a designer store with luxury Italian and British designer labels including Genny and Jean Muir. Unexpectedly, Khan sold the store in 1982 to Singaporean fashion retailer Tina Tan-Leo, married and moved to Malaysia.

=== Melium Group ===
In 1987, Khan opened Le Salon, a multi-brand boutique which carried notable brand including Versace and Alberta Ferretti. Then in 1989, she rebranded Le Salon to Melium Group set up in association with German leather brand Aigner, and menswear label Hugo Boss. The Melium Group operates 38 stores in Malaysia and runs Aseana, a luxury multi-brand boutique. The group also owns and operates a chain of 18 dome cafes in Malaysia. Under the leadership of Khan, the Melium Group operates in Indonesia as lone stores at the W Retreat & Spa in Bali and Plaza Indonesia, Jakarta.

=== FARAH KHAN (label) ===
Under the Melium Group umbrella, Khan launched in 2007, the fashion label FARAH KHAN that integrates Southeast Asian beadwork and modern styles. The label retails in several cities worldwide.
