= Vanessa Tevi =

Malaysian model and beauty pageant titleholder

Chinese name
- Traditional Chinese: 溫妮莎
- Simplified Chinese: 温妮莎
- Hanyu Pinyin: Wēn Níshā
- Jyutping: Wan1 Nei4 Saa1
- Hokkien POJ: Un Nî-sa
- Tâi-lô: Un Nî-sa

Vanessa Tevi Kumares (Tamil: வெனெசா தேவி குமரேஸ்; simplified Chinese: 温妮莎; traditional Chinese: 溫妮莎; pinyin: Wēn Níshā; Jyutping: Wan1 Nei4 Saa1; Pe̍h-ōe-jī: Un Nî-sa; born 4 December 1991) is a Malaysian Chindian model and beauty pageant titleholder, who was crowned Miss Universe Malaysia 2015. She represented her country at Miss Universe 2015 pageant.

== Personal life ==
Vanessa Tevi is a Malaysian of Indian and Chinese parentage. Her father is of Tamil Indian descent and her mother is of Hokkien Chinese descent. She is a former student at SMK Puteri and Taylor's University Lakeside campus, and graduated in Britain at the University of Sunderland with a degree in Tourism Management. After graduating from the University of Sunderland, she took an internship at the Marriott in Chandler, Arizona, United States, for a year before working for a hotel in Singapore.

== Career ==
=== Pageantry ===
==== Miss Universe Malaysia 2015 ====
Tevi was crowned Miss Universe Malaysia 2015 on 18 April 2015, beating 16 other hopefuls. She represented Malaysia at the Miss Universe 2015 pageant.

==== Miss Universe 2015 ====
Tevi represented Malaysia at the global 64th Miss Universe 2015 pageant held in Las Vegas, US on 20 December 2015. She failed to place in the semi-finals, but garnered media attention and acclaim by being the first candidate to embrace the pageant winner, Miss Universe 2015 Pia Wurtzbach after the incident.

=== Modelling ===
In October 2016, Tevi was selected as one of two Malaysian women to represent Puma as the brand's official ambassadors for the Southeast Asia market, in conjunction with the launch of the sportswear company's “Do You” campaign.

Awards and achievements
Preceded by Sabrina Beneett	Miss Universe Malaysia; 2015	Succeeded by Kiran Jassal
