= Miss Universe Malaysia 2015 =

- Date: 17 April 2015
- Presenters: Will Quah • Sarah Lian
- Venue: Shangri-La Hotel, Kuala Lumpur, Malaysia
- Entrants: 17
- Placements: 10
- Winner: Vanessa Tevi Kumares; Negeri Sembilan
- Congeniality: Kohinoor Kaur (Sabah)
- Photogenic: Sugeeta Chandran (Selangor)

Miss Universe Malaysia 2015, the 49th edition of the Miss Universe Malaysia, was held on 17 April 2015 at Shangri-La Hotel, Kuala Lumpur. Vanessa Tevi Kumares of Negeri Sembilan was crowned by the outgoing titleholder, Sabrina Beneet lof Perak at the end of the event. She then represented Malaysia at the Miss Universe 2014 pageant in Las Vegas, United States.

== Results ==
Final Results	Contestants
Miss Universe Malaysia 2015	Negeri Sembilan – Vanessa Tevi Kumares
1st Runner–Up	Selangor – Pauline Tan Li Shin
2nd Runner–Up	Sabah – Kelly Jagan
3rd Runner–Up	Selangor – Sugeeta Chandran
Top 6	Kedah – Meera Maniar; Selangor – Jenny Wong
Top 10	Penang – Gloria Tneh; Sarawak – Jasveer Sandhu; Selangor – Ashley Ahn; Selangor – Nisha Kumar

=== Special awards ===
Awards	Contestants
Miss Photogenic	Selangor – Sugeeta Chandran
Miss Congeniality	Sabah – Kohinoor Kaur
Miss Talent	Selangor – April Tang
Miss Best Body	Kedah – Meera Maniar
Miss My Dentist Winning Smile	Selangor – Pauline Tan
Miss Naza Maserati Elegance	Penang – Gloria Tneh

== Contestants ==
No.	Contestant	Age	Height	Ethnicity	Hometown	Occupation	Notes
1	Amanda Khong Pui Mun	25	5 ft 7 1/2 in (1.71 m)	Chinese	Kuala Lumpur	Internet Entrepreneur	
2	April Tang	24	5 ft 7 in (1.70 m)	Chinese	Selangor	Secretary/ DJ	
3	Ashley Ahn	22	5 ft 9 in (1.75 m)	Chinese-Korean	Selangor	Writer/TV Host	Top 10
4	Gloria Tneh	23	5 ft 6 1/2 in (1.69 m)	Chinese-Indian	Penang	Law Student	Top 10
5	Jasveer Sandhu	26	5 ft 10 in (1.78 m)	Indian	Sarawak	Staff Nurse	Top 10
6	Jenny Wong	23	5 ft 8 in (1.73 m)	Chinese-Indian	Selangor	Teacher/Freelance Model	Top 6
7	Kelly Jagan	25	5 ft 8 1/2 in (1.74 m)	Chinese-Indian	Sabah	Professional Model	2nd Runner-up
8	Kohinoor Kaur Kaittiani	22	5 ft 7 1/2 in (1.71 m)	Indian	Sabah	Law Student	
9	Meera Maniar	23	5 ft 5 1/2 in (1.66 m)	Indian	Kedah	Social Entrepreneur	Top 6
10	Nisha Kumar	24	5 ft 7 2/3 in (1.72 m)	Indian	Selangor	Physiotherapist	Top 10
11	Pauline Tan Li Shin	21	5 ft 6 in (1.68 m)	Chinese	Selangor	Actress	1st Runner-up
12	Pauline Thong	21	5 ft 7 in (1.70 m)	Chinese	Selangor	Accounting Student	
13	Shaelina Martin John Patrick	22	5 ft 7 in (1.70 m)	Indian	Selangor	Medical Student	
14	Shalini Mathialagan	20	5 ft 6 1/2 in (1.69 m)	Chinese-Indian	Kuala Lumpur	Flight Attendant	
15	Sugeeta Chandran	25	5 ft 9 1/2 in (1.77 m)	Indian	Selangor	Physciolagy Student	3rd Runner-up
16	Vaishnevi Thanaseharan	23	5 ft 8 in (1.73 m)	Indian	Kuala Lumpur	Medical Student	
17	Vanessa Tevi Kumares	23	5 ft 7 in (1.70 m)	Chinese-Indian	Negeri Sembilan	Tourism Management	
