= List of Malaysians of Indian descent =

This is a list of notable Malaysians of Indian origin, including original immigrants who obtained Malaysian citizenship and their Malaysian descendants. Entries on this list are demonstrably notable by having a linked current article or reliable sources as footnotes against the name to verify they are notable and define themselves either full or partial Indian origin, whose ethnic origin lie in India.

This list also includes emigrant Malaysians of Indian origin and could be taken as a list of famous Malaysians of Indian origin.

== Academicians ==
- Abdullah Abdul Kadir
- Chandra Muzaffar
- Jomo Kwame Sundram, Economist
- K. S. Maniam
- Lloyd Fernando
- Muthucumaraswamy Sornarajah
- Shan Ratnam

== Activists, social workers, environmentalist and lawyers ==
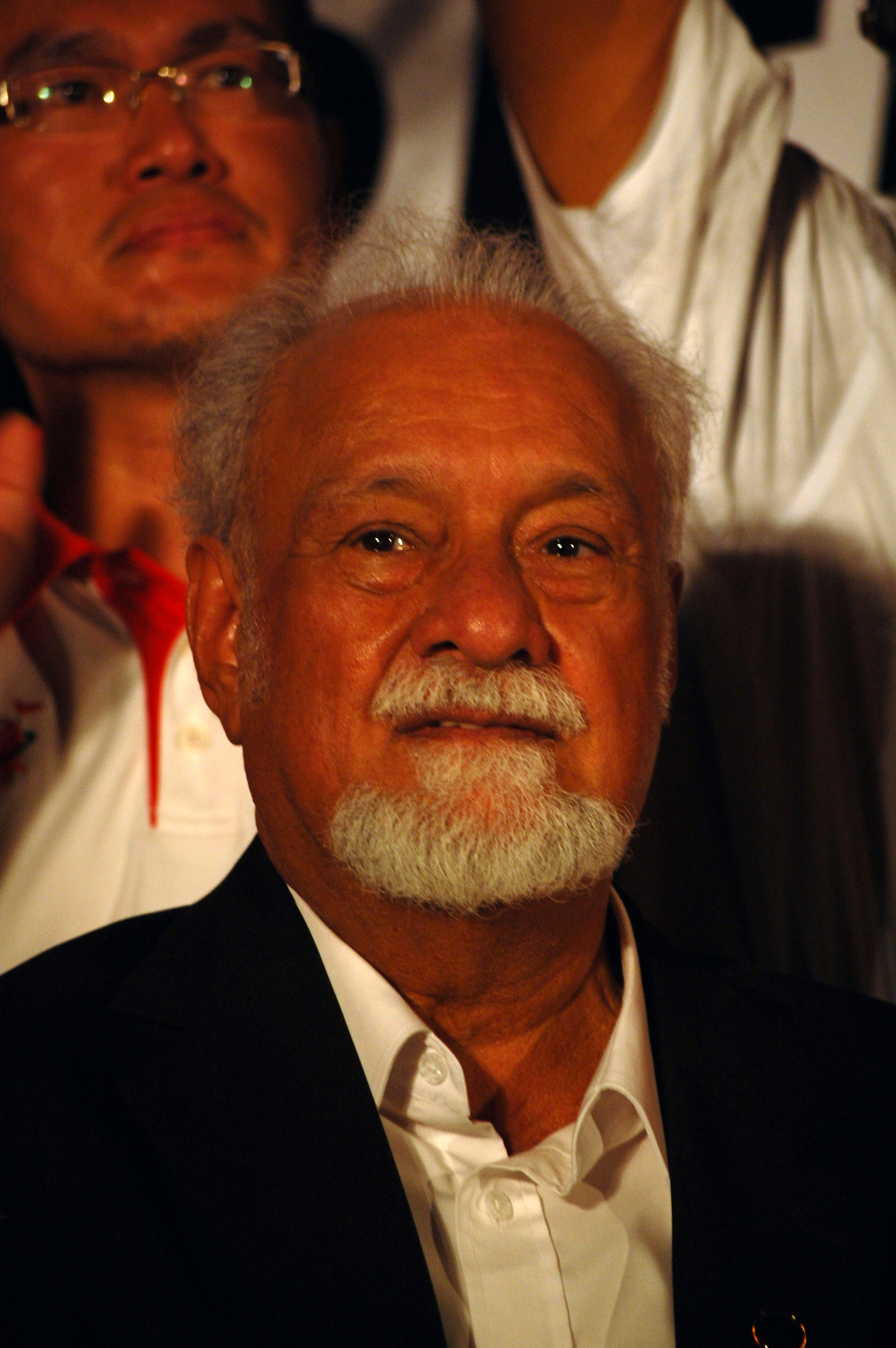
Karpal Singh, lawyer and politician

- Ambiga Sreenevasan, ex-president of the Malaysian Bar Council and active activist
- Cecil Rajendra, human rights activist
- Chacko Vadaketh, Malaysian actor, writer, television personality and MC
- Charles Hector, Malaysian human rights advocate and activist
- D. R. Seenivasagam
- G. Rama Iyer
- Gengadharan Nair
- Gurmit Singh, Singaporean actor of part Malaysian-Punjabi descent
- Hans Isaac, Malaysian actor, producer, director and a former model
- Irene Fernandez (1946–2014)
- Irene Xavier, women's rights activist
- Ivy Josiah
- K. L. Devaser
- Kamal Bamadhaj, political science student and human rights activist, who was killed in the Dili Massacre in East Timor on 12 November 1991
- Karpal Singh (1940–2014), prominent Malaysian politician, lawyer and human rights activist
- Latheefa Koya, fifth Chief Commissioner of the Malaysian Anti-Corruption Commission (MACC) from June 2019 to March 2020.
- M. Manoharan, prominent lawyer, politician, HINDRAF (legal adviser)
- Mahadev Shankar
- Mary Shanthi Dairiam, Malaysian human rights and women's rights advocate; elected member from Malaysia to the Committee on the Elimination of All Forms of Discrimination against Women (2005–2008) and United Nations official.
- Murugan Chillayah
- Murugesan Sinnandavar
- Nisha Ayub, Malaysian transgender rights activist.
- Param Cumaraswamy, high-profile Malaysian lawyer from Kuala Lumpur; Chair of the Malaysian Bar Council from 1986 to 1988; United Nations Special Rapporteur on the Independence of Judges and Lawyers by the UN Commission on Human Rights from 1994 to 2003
- R. Ramani, second president of Malaya Bar Council; first Asian president of Malaya Bar Council
- Ramon Tikaram, British stage and screen actor
- Rasammah Bhupalan, social activist
- Ravichandran, Tamil film actor who played lead roles in Tamil movies of the 1960s and 1970
- P. Uthayakumar, founder of HINDRAF
- S. M. Mohamed Idris, consumer rights activist
- Steven Thiru, current president of Malaysian Bar
- Uma Sambanthan

== Actresses and female models ==
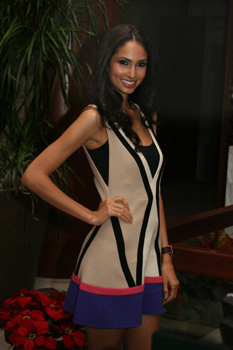
Deborah Priya, winner of Miss Malaysia

- Amelia Thripura Henderson, Malaysian actress
- Andrea Fonseka, Malaysian model, television presenter, actress and beauty pageant titleholder
- Anaika Soti, Bollywood and Kollywood actress; attended high school in Malaysia
- Deborah Priya Henry, winner of Miss Malaysia 2011, television personality, and actress
- Haanii Shivraj (1991–2014), Malaysian actress
- Kavita Sidhu, actress and former beauty queen
- Kiran Jassal, Miss Universe Malaysia 2016
- Melinder Bhullar, Miss Malaysia World 2013
- Nadine Ann Thomas, winner of Miss Malaysia 2010
- Neelofa
- Nicole Arumugam, British actress
- Nithya Shree, actress and makeup artist
- Pushpa Narayan, Malaysia actress and model
- Ramya Raj, Malaysia-born actress who acts in Tamil cinema
- Rubini Sambanthan, former beauty queen and model. She stars in the sixth cycle of Asia's Next Top Model.
- Sabrina Beneett, winner of Miss Malaysia 2014
- Sangeeta Krishnasamy, actress and model; first Malaysian woman to act in a Tamil movie
- Sharon Alaina Stephen, Malaysian actress
- Shuba Jay, Malaysian actress; was killed, together with her husband and daughter, in the shootdown of Malaysia Airlines Flight 17
- Shweta Sekhon, winner of Miss Universe Malaysia 2019 and Miss World Malaysia 2016
- Tatiana Kumar, Miss World Malaysia 2016
- Thanuja Ananthan, Miss World Malaysia 2009-2010
- Vanessa Tevi, winner of Miss Malaysia 2015

== Ancient rulers ==
- Tun Ali of Malacca, fourth Bendahara of the Malaccan Sultanate
- Tun Fatimah, daughter to the Malaccan Bendahara who lived during the 16th century; was married to Malacca's Sultan Mahmud Shah as one of his consorts after all her male siblings were executed
- Tun Mutahir of Malacca, famous bendahara of the Malaccan Sultanate

== Arts and entertainment ==
- 'Punnagai Poo' Gheetha, the first female producer of Tamil films
- Hans Isaac, Malaysian actor, producer, director, and former model
- Huzir Sulaiman, Malaysian actor, director, and writer
- V. Nagaraj, prominent Malaysian director
- B. S. Rajhans, Malaysia's first filmmaker
- Praboo Ariva, Malaysia youngest director
- Prem Nath, Malaysia director
- Pria Viswalingam, Malaysian-born Australian documentary and filmmaker
- Redza Piyadasa
- Rani Moorthy, Malaysian-born playwright, actress, and artistic director of Rasa Productions
- Sharad Sharan, journalist and film director
- Solamalay Namasivayam, artist
- Syed Thajudeen, artist
- Zabrina Fernandez, television producer
- Geraldine Viswanathan, Australian actress
- Zulkiflee Anwar Haque, cartoonist

== Business people and entrepreneurs ==
- Ananda Krishnan, 3rd richest man in Malaysia, has a son who is a Theravada Buddhist monk known as Ajahn Siripanyo.
- Arul Kanda Kandasamy, Ex-President and CEO of 1Malaysia Development Berhad
- Bastianpillai Paul Nicholas, first Asian banker in British Malaya
- Doraisingam Pillai, CEO of Lotus chain of restaurants and companies
- G. Gnanalingam, current executive chairman of Westports Malaysia Sdn Bhd
- Maha Sinnathamby, founder of Greater Springfield
- Naraina Pillai, social entrepreneur and businessman, who spent most of his life in Singapore during the colonial period; of Tamil origins, he greatly contributed to the Tamil community in Singapore
- Ninian Mogan Lourdenadin
- K. L. Palaniappan, architect, businessman, and executive director of MK Land
- Shoba Purushothaman, co-founder of The NewsMarket
- K. R. Somasundram, Head of National Land Finance Co-Operative
- K. Thamboosamy Pillay, a significant figure of Kuala Lumpur and Sri Mahamariamman Temple, Kuala Lumpur
- Tony Fernandes, Malaysian entrepreneur and founder of Tune Air Sendirian Berhad; introduced the first budget, no-frills, and low-cost airline, AirAsia, to Malaysia and Asia with the tagline "Now Everyone Can Fly"
- Vinod Balachandra Sekhar, businessman, president and Group Chief Executive of Putra Group
- Weeratunge Edward Perera, Malaysian Sinhalese educator, businessman and social entrepreneur

== Comedians ==
- Indi Nadarajah, actor, comedian, and singer based in Kuala Lumpur, Malaysia
- Kavin Jayaram, stand-up comedian

== Criminals ==
- Nagaenthran K. Dharmalingam, drug trafficker executed in Singapore
- Pannir Selvam Pranthaman, drug trafficker sentenced to death in Singapore
- Datchinamurthy Kataiah, drug trafficker sentenced to death in Singapore
- Gobi Avedian, drug trafficker sentenced to 15 years' jail and ten strokes of the cane for drug trafficking in Singapore
- Kalwant Singh Jogindar Singh, drug trafficker executed in Singapore
- Vignes Mourthi, drug trafficker executed in Singapore

== Dancers ==
- January Low Wye San (born 1985), classical dancer of Orissi and Bharathanatyam forms

== Deejays and television personalities ==
- Jonathan Putra, television host and actor, Channel V VJ, model, and musician
- Rueben Thevandran (Burn), Malaysian radio personality, television host, singer, and voice-over artist

== Doctors ==
- M. K. Rajakumar
- T. Sachithanandan
- Thirunavuk Arasu Sinnathuray

== Fashion designer ==
- Bernard Chandran, Malaysia's "King of Fashion"

== Freedom fighters and nationalists ==
- S. A. Ganapathy, veteran of the communist underground resistance to Japanese occupation and postwar trade unionist in then Malaya; first president of the 300,000-strong Pan Malayan Federation of Trade Unions (PMFTU); was hanged by the colonial authorities in 1949 after being convicted for allegedly being in possession of firearms
- Janaky Athi Nahappan, one of the earliest women involved in the fight for Malaysian (then Malaya) independence
- John Thivy, founding president of the Malayan Indian Congress
- Rasammah Bhupalan, Malaysian freedom fighter and social activist
- V. T. Sambanthan, a Founding Father of Independent Malaysia and the fifth president of the Malaysian Indian Congress
- V. Manickavasagam, Malaysian freedom fighter and the sixth president of the Malaysian Indian Congress
- R. G. Balan

== Journalists ==
- M. G. G. Pillai, political activist and journalist
- Rehman Rashid, journalist

== Legal authorities ==
- Augustine Paul
- Balasubramaniam Perumal
- Baltej Singh Dhillon, first Royal Canadian Mounted Police officer allowed to wear a turban
- Gengadharan Nair, high courts of Malaysia
- K. S. Rajah, Senior Counsel and former Judicial Commissioner of the Supreme Court of Singapore
- G. Rama Iyer
- K. Thanabalasingam
- Steven Thiru, prominent Malaysian lawyer and former President of Malaysian Bar.
- Tommy Thomas, barrister and former Attorney General of Malaysia

== Literary figures ==
- John Davies, archivist, writer, and received the prestigious Ahli Mangku Negara award
- K. S. Maniam, novelist and academician
- Munshi Abdullah, early Malayan historian and the father of modern Malay literature
- Preeta Samarasan, finalist for the Commonwealth Writers Prize 2009
- Rani Manicka, author and novelist
- Shamini Flint
- Malachi Edwin Vethamani, Malaysian-born Indian poet, writer, editor, bibliographer, academic and critic
- Uthaya Sankar SB, Malaysian writer

== Martial artists ==
- Joe Thambu

== Astronauts ==
- S. Vanajah, one of the finalists for Malaysia's Angkasawan programme

== Mountaineers ==
- M. Moorthy, member of the first group of Malaysians to successfully climb Mount Everest
- M. Magendran, the first Malaysian Man who climbed the Mount Everest on 1997

== Musicians ==
- Alvin Anthons, entertainer, professional emcee, event manager, radio DJ and singer
- Ash Nair, Malaysian alternative musician and former contestant of season two of Malaysian Idol
- C Loco, now known as Sashi C Loco, co-founder of Poetic Ammo
- Chakra Sonic, Malaysian hip hop musician
- Dave Gahan, English singer-songwriter, member of Depeche Mode; father is Malaysian-Indian
- David Arumugam, Malaysian singer and founder of Alleycats
- Dhilip Varman, singer, lyricist, and composer
- D J Dave, popular Malaysian singer and entertainer active in the 1970s and 1980s
- Gerald Sellan, songwriter, composer and drum player for Malaysian/American rock band, Beat the system
- Guy Sebastian, Australian pop, R&B, and soul singer-songwriter who was the first winner of Australian Idol in 2003; currently a judge on the Australian version of The X Factor
- Harikrish Menon, singer and songwriter
- Helen Savari, member of the popular duet, Cenderawasih, active in the 1980s
- Irene Savari, member of the popular duet, Cenderawasih, active in the 1980s
- Jaclyn Victor, winner of the first Malaysian Idol and current number-one pop singer of Malaysia; acted in many Malaysian and Tamil movies
- Kamahl, cabaret or easy listening singer and recording artist
- Loganathan Arumugam, Malaysian singer
- Moots, frontman and rapper for the famous rap rock band Pop Shuvit
- Manjit Singh Gill
- Prema Lucas
- Prema Yin, Malaysian musician and singer
- Prashanthini, playback singer in Tamil cinema
- Reshmonu, singer-songwriter from Malaysia who does mostly English songs
- Ronnie Pereira, lead guitarist and singer of the 1970s band Revolvers
- Shanmugam Arumugam, guitarist
- Shree Chandran, rapper and music producer
- Stewart Sellan, electric and acoustic guitar player for Malaysian/American rock band, Beat the System
- Sukhjit Singh Gill, member of Goldkartz
- Tanita Tikaram, British pop-folk singer-songwriter
- Malaysia Vasudevan, Tamil playback singer and actor in the Tamil film industry
- Yogi B, often referred to as Kavidhai Kundargal; known as the godfather of Tamil rap; currently famous rapper in Kollywood; co-founder of Poetic Ammo
- Yugendran, playback singer in Tamil cinema

== Religious ==
- Ven. Dr. Kirinde Sri Dhammananda Nāyaka Thero, Sri Lankan Buddhist monk and scholar, often regarded as Chief High Priest of Malaysia and Singapore
- Ven. Datuk K. Sri Dhammaratana, Sri Lankan Buddhist monk and instrumental in setting up Ti-Ratana Welfare Society
- Antony Selvanayagam, Bishop Emeritus of the Diocese of Penang
- Anthony Soter Fernandez, Archbishop Emeritus of the Roman Catholic Archdiocese of Kuala Lumpur
- Murphy Pakiam, metropolitan archbishop of the Roman Catholic Archdiocese

== Scientists ==
- Alastair Robinson
- Mahaletchumy Arujunan, listed as one of the 100 most influential people in the field of biotechnology by the 7th edition of The Scientist American Worldwide View: A Global Biotechnology Perspective Journal
- Satwant Singh Dhaliwal, Malaysian geneticist, academic and author
- B. C. Shekhar

== See also ==
- List of Malaysians
- List of Malay people
- List of Malaysians of Chinese descent
- List of Singaporean Indians
