= List of Singaporean Indians =

This is a list of notable Singaporean Indians.

== Academicians ==
- Kishore Mahbubani
- Shan Ratnam - professor and head of the department of Obstetrics and Gynaecology of the National University Hospital of Singapore
- Abhimanyu Goel - Researcher and architect

== Actors, actresses and models ==
- Dalreena Poonam Gill - winner of Miss World Singapore (2014); Singapore football referee
- Gurmit Singh - popular actor, host and comedy performer; best known for his role in Phua Chu Kang Pte Ltd
- Kumar - comedian, television host, actor, and drag queen
- Michelle Saram
- Nuraliza Osman - beauty queen who represented Singapore at the Miss Universe 2002
- Pilar Arlando - Miss Singapore World for 2009–2010
- Rathi Menon - model and beauty pageant titleholder who won the title of Miss Singapore Universe 2014

== Arts and entertainment ==
- Haresh Sharma - Singaporean playwright
- Neila Sathyalingam - Singaporean classical Indian dancer
- T. Sasitharan

== Businessmen ==
- G. Ramachandran
- Naraina Pillai - social entrepreneur and businessman
- Thomas Thomas
- Bhupendra Kumar Modi
- G. S. Sareen, Omni United
- Karan Singh Thakral
- Saurabh Mittal
- Piyush Gupta, banker
- Vinod Kannan
- Rajeev Suri

== Criminals ==
- Gaiyathiri Murugayan, maid abuser and killer
- Julaiha Begum, wife of murdered ex-cop T Maniam for instigating her husband's murder.
- Kalidass Sinnathamby Narayanasamy, an army lance corporal sentenced to death for molesting and killing his seven-year-old niece.
- Mathavakannan Kalimuthu, convicted murderer who was granted clemency by then President of Singapore Ong Teng Cheong and placed under life imprisonment.
- Maniam Rathinswamy and S. S. Asokan, the two security guards responsible for killing a loan shark.
- Nadarajah Govindasamy, a businessman executed in 1977 for killing the fiancé of his daughter
- Surajsrikan Diwakar Mani Tripathi, a 20-year-old unemployed man who murdered a jogger at Punggol Field.
- Shanmugam Murugesu, a drug trafficker and former sports athlete who was executed in 2005
- Somasundarajoo s/o Vengdasalam, Somasundram s/o Subramaniam and Ponapalam s/o Govindasamy, the three Indians who were among the eighteen rioters hanged for killing four prison officers during the Pulau Senang riots
- Vasavan Sathiadew, who killed his foster brother
- S. Nagarajan Kuppusamy, a lorry driver hanged for killing a prison warden
- Saminathan Subramaniam, a convicted criminal jailed for manslaughter
- Tangaraju Suppiah, drug trafficker
- Bala Kuppusamy, serial rapist
- G. Krishnasamy Naidu, a former taxi driver sentenced to life imprisonment for killing and decapitating his wife
- Soosainathan Dass Saminathan, a jobless man hanged for the rape and murder of an Indonesian baby girl
- Stephen Francis, Richard James and Konesekaram Nagalingam, the three Indian teenagers hanged for the Gold Bars triple murders of 1971
- Sagar Suppiah Retnam, a gang leader of Ang Soon Tong who was executed for killing a bystander during a gang clash
- Anbuarsu Joseph, a gang leader of Gi Leng Kiat who was executed for murder
- Gunasegaran Ramasamy, a convicted robber jailed for stabbing a woman to death

== Doctors ==
- Balaji Sadasivan
- Gopal Baratham
- Kanwaljit Soin

== Deejays and television personalities ==
- Anita Kapoor
- Sharanjit Leyl - reporter, producer and presenter with BBC World News
- Vanessa Fernandez

== Lawyers ==
- Davinder Singh
- Eugene Thuraisingam - Human rights lawyer
- Glenn Knight - Singaporean lawyer and the first Director of the Commercial Affairs Department (CAD)
- Rajesh Sreenivasan
- Subhas Anandan - prominent criminal lawyer in Singapore

== Legal authorities and diplomats ==
- Dileep Nair - United Nations Under-Secretary-General for Internal Oversight Services; head of the United Nations Office of Internal Oversight Services
- Gopinath Pillai
- Kasinather Saunthararajah - Senior Counsel and former Judicial Commissioner of the Supreme Court of Singapore
- Ravinder Singh - Singaporean former army general
- Sundaresh Menon - Chief Justice of Singapore; former Attorney-General of Singapore; first ethnic Indian to hold both posts
- T. S. Sinnathuray - former Singaporean Supreme Court judge
- Vijaya Kumar Rajah - current Attorney-General of Singapore

== Literary figures ==
- Chandran Nair - Singaporean poet and retired Director and Mediator of UNESCO
- Edwin Thumboo
- Janadas Devan - Singaporean journalist
- M. Balakrishnan - Singaporean author, popularly known by his pen name Ma Ilangkannan; first Tamil writer to receive the South East Asian Writers Award in 1982
- V. R. Gopala Pillai

== Musicians ==
- Krissy - rapper and singer
- Lady Kash - award-winning international rapper and songwriter
- Paul Abisheganaden - conductor and Cultural Medallion recipient
- Priyadarshini - playback singer, researcher and performer whose works are predominantly in the Tamil, Kannada, Telugu and Hindi cinema industries.
- Shabir - award-winning singer-songwriter, record producer, music composer and performer whose works are predominantly in Tamil

== Politicians ==
- Vivian Balakrishnan - Minister for Foreign Affairs
- S. Dhanabalan
- S. Iswaran
- S. Jayakumar - politician, diplomat, lawyer and author
- J B Jeyeratnam
- Devan Nair - 3rd President of Singapore
- Hri Kumar Nair
- Indranee Rajah - Minister, Prime Minister's Office, Second Minister for Finance and Second Minister for National Development
- K. Shanmugam - Coordinating Minister for National Security of Singapore & Minister for Home Affairs
- Tharman Shanmugaratnam - current President of Singapore
- Pritam Singh - Leader of the Opposition, Secretary-General of the Workers' Party
- Paul Tambyah - chairman of the Singapore Democratic Party and infectious diseases consultant
- Hamid Razak - Parliamentian
- Inderjit Singh (Singaporean politician)
- Vikram Nair
- Dinesh Vasu Dash
- Murali Pillai
- Janil Puthucheary

== Religious ==
- Rennis Ponniah - 9th Bishop of Singapore

== Sportspeople ==
=== Athletics ===
- C Kunalan
- Kesavan Soon

=== Cricket ===
- Mahadevan Sathasivam
- Stacey Muruthi

=== Football and soccer ===
- Anumanthan Kumar - Singapore international footballer
- Ram Shanker
- Rhysh Roshan Rai
- Madhu Mohana - Singaporean footballer

=== Tennis ===
- Rheeya Doshi

=== Petanque ===
- Shanti Prakash Upadhayay

== Others ==
- Satheesh Noel Gobidass, victim of an alleged murder case at Orchard Towers in 2019

== See also ==
- List of Malaysians of Indian descent
