= 2013 AIM Malaysian-Indian Awards =

AIM Malaysian-Indian 2013
- Location: Setia City Conventions Centre, Shah Alam, Selangor
- Hosted by: Aanantha; Sangeeta Krishnasamy; Muthu Kumaran (Red Carpet)

Television/radio coverage
- Network: Astro Vaanavil

The 2013 AIM Malaysian Indian were held on 12 October 2013 at the Setia City Convention Centre, Shah Alam, Selangor. Marking the debut and first instalment of the award show. The inaugural AIM Malaysian-Indian music awards show, sponsored by the Ministry of Information, Communications & Culture (MICC). The award is to recognise and honouring Malaysian based Indian artist talents.

The awards nominations are open to albums, singles and music videos released in Malaysia during the period from 1 January 2010 to 31 December 2012 except for the category of Best New Artiste which is only for first album/single released during the period from 1 January 2012 to 31 December 2012. The award show were telecast on Astro Vaanavil.

== Nominees and winners ==
Winners are listed first and highlighted in bold.

Best New Artist	Best Vocal Performance in a Song (Male)
**Vinesh Kumar – Thanimaiyil (Single)**; Ashtaka – Let's Get It Together (Album: Ashtaka); Hashmitha Selvam - Indru Vaazhnthidalaam (Single); Subrah G – Vennigam (Album: Love Signature); Thyivya Kalaiselvan – Inni Vendham (Single)	**Dhilip Varman – Mazhaiye Mazhaiye**; Dhilip Varman – Vizhigal Seruma; Jay – Enggo Tulainthavan; Siddarthan – Theende Thheende; Vinod Kumar – Antha Nimidham
Best Vocal Performance in a Song (Female)	Best Duo/Group/Collaboration Vocal Performance in a Song
**Hasmitha Selvam – Let Love Take Over**; Gowri Arumugam – Yenggugiren; Preeta Prasad – Sri Ragavendhira; Shamala – Sha Na; Thila Laxshman – Yennule Yennule	**Suresh Rogen & Suganya Jagathesan – Vinukku Sontham Vennila**; Dhilip Varman & Sharmila Sivaguru – Mazhaiye Vann Mazhaiye; Jay & Thilai Laxshman – Uchi Muthal; Sevviyal Darren & Siddarthan – Vaire Vengai; Sidhartan & Preeta Prasad – Mana Mathure
Best Folk/Gana Song	Best Rock Song
**Naa Venuma Appa Venuma – Shanthesh**; Maduraikara Panggale – Ragu, Jay & Vijeyandara; Mannin Mainthargal Deepavali – Suresh Rogen, Jack (No Entry), Psycomantra, Rahna; Punjabi Jeha – Goldkartz; Sollamal Varumo – Harikumar & Phycomantra	**VMB 2.0 – Vikadakavi & Denesh**; Crystal – Casino; Samba Sakthi – Boy Mj feat Hindu Ozacky; Vaathiyar:The Kingdom of Janmavaram -The Villanz
Best Hip Hop/Rap Song	Best Pop/Contemporary Song
**Scooter Vandi**; Symphony Nillevey; Tamileh Swag; Thamilachi; Unnai Parthe Pinbu	**Enggo Tulainthavan**; Machane Va Va; Povin Odu; Thendee Thendee; Yennule Yennule
Best Song in a Drama/Film	Best Devotional Song
**Maana Mathure – Anushthaana (film)**; Enggo Tulainthauan – Maduraikaran (film); Mazhaiye Vann Mazhaiye – Vilaiyaatu Pasange (film); Povin Odu – Orr Iravu (Drama); Yennule Yennule – Yaar Kutram (Drama)	Varam; Ayyapan; Sri Ragavendhira; Tammarai Kanna; Yenn Kural

- Best Engineered Album : Album Crystal by Artist Casino
- Best Music Video : Naduvan
- Best Album Cover : Ashtaka by Wan &Reshmonu
- Best Musical Arrangement award : Boy Radge

== Performers and award presenter ==
=== Performers ===
- Ashtaka
- Coco Nantha
- Goldkartz
- Hashmitha Selvam
- Helen Doreena
- Jay
- OG Dass
- Shruthi J
- Siddarthan
- Suresh Rogen
- Thila
- Laxshman

=== Presenters ===
- Tan Sri A K Nathan
- Allan Perera
- Asangani
- Dato’ David Arumugam
- Datuk DJ Dave
- Dato’ Ganesan
- Indi Nadarajah
- Datin Seri Manimala N. T. Rajah
- Dato’ Muthu Kumar
- Mydin Sultan
- DCP Datuk A. Paramasivam
- Tamil Selvee
- P Unnikrishnan
