= Genga =

Genga may refer to:

- Genga (原画), Japanese animation terminology for key animation drawings, literally meaning "original pictures"
- Genga, California, former Tongva village
- Genga, Marche, Italy
- Genga, Liberia
- Girolamo Genga (c. 1476 – 1551), Italian artist
- Bernardino Genga (1620–1690), Italian artist
- Gengadharan Nair (1944–2007), Malaysian judge
