= Vamba Sherif =

Dutch writer of Liberian descent (born 1973)

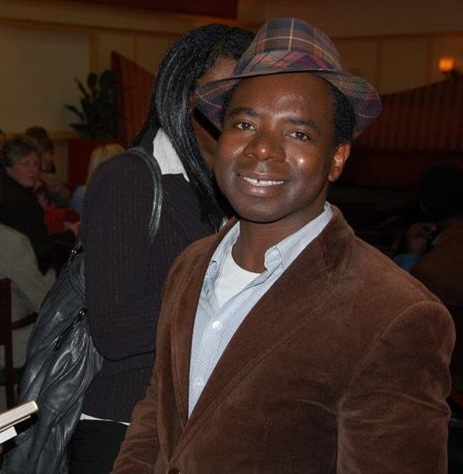
- Sherif in 2015
- Born: 1973 (age 52–53); Kolahun, Liberia
- Occupation: Author
- Writing career
- Language: Dutch
- Period: 1999–present
- Genres: Novels; essays; columns
- Notable work: Land of My Fathers
- Website: vambasherif.com

Vamba Sherif (born 1973) is a Liberian-born writer residing in the Netherlands. He writes in English and Dutch. His 2015 novel The Emperor's Son deals with Samori Toure, who founded a great empire in northwestern Africa in the 19th century. Toure fought the English and the French to hold on to this empire.

== Personal life ==
Sherif was born in Kolahun, Liberia, in 1973 and spent parts of his youth in Kuwait, where he completed his secondary education. The First Gulf War compelled him to flee Kuwait and settle first in Syria and then in the Netherlands, where he studied law. The Liberian civil war triggered the need in him to explain Liberia to himself, which resulted in his first novel, about the founding of the country, published in Dutch under the title Het land van de vaders, in 1999, and in English translation as Land of My Fathers, in 2016. His second book was The Kingdom of Sebah, published in 2003, followed by Bound to Secrecy in 2006 and The Witness in 2011. Bound to Secrecy was chosen as one of the ten best translated books in Germany in 2010 in a list that included Robert Bolaño's 2666. Sherif has written for numerous publications in the Netherlands and around the world, including The New York Times, Long Cours in France, and KulturAustausch in Germany. One of his earliest stories, "Faces", was published in African Writing, and his tale "The Bridge of Sighs" was published in The Kalahari Review.

== Books ==
- Land of My Fathers (1999): A novel about the founding of Liberia. Edward Richards, born into slavery in America, leaves for Liberia to join his beloved Charlotte after not having seen her for twenty years. In Liberia, he is confronted with the difficulties the settlers face regarding the people scattered along the coast and the hinterland of Liberia. Edward decides to head for the hinterland to preach the word of God to the natives. There he meets a remarkable man, Halay. When his land is threatened with war and the oracle ordains that a man must sacrifice himself in order to avert an imminent war and ensure a lasting peace, it is Halay who rises up to the challenge.
- The Kingdom of Sebah (2003): A Liberian family migrates to Europe to seek their fortune. The family's progress, however, is hampered not by the challenges the new world throws in their path but by the secrets they carry with them. The story is told from the perspective of the son, who is a writer.
- Bound to Secrecy (2007): William Mawolo arrives in a small Liberian town with a secret mission: to investigate the mysterious disappearance of the police chief. The locals, however, are far from happy about his presence, and their hostility increases daily, threatening to boil over. At the same time, Mawolo is drawn to the absent chief's daughter, Makemeh, who for some reason doesn't seem to be too concerned about her missing father. Intrigued, Mawolo decides to stay longer than required and even attempts to take charge of the town. Little by little, he begins to behave like the despotic man whose disappearance he came to investigate. His desire to uncover the town's dark secrets puts him in danger.
- The Witness (2011): Onno, a 70-year-old white man, meets and falls in love with a mysterious woman with a past rooted in the Liberian civil war. The novel explores the accuracy of memory, empathy as a theme, and the impact of some of our decisions on our lives.
- The Emperor's Son (2015): Zaiwulo is thirteen when he leaves his home of Haindi in the forest of present-day Liberia and travels with his father to Musadu, an old city in the savannah in present-day Guinea. He comes to study under Talahat, a great scholar and head of a prosperous and legendary family, the Haidarahs. This family traces its origin to Timbuktu. It is believed that the source of the family wealth and vast knowledge are found in an ancient manuscript that Talahat keeps in his study. Zaiwulo suspects that there is more to his presence amongst the Haidarahs than his father, who abandons him in Musadu, is willing to let on. Throughout his life, he is plagued by that secret and its implications, by the silence on the part of his teacher and everyone else. Zaiwulo's story unfolds in a period that was largely determined by the will of a single man, Samori Toure. Once a trader, Samori became a slave to save his mother and rose up to confront his slave master. Samori became the only leader in Africa who confronted the might of the French and the British in an attempt to hold on to his empire. His campaigns against these powers lasted years, affecting many parts of West Africa, including Liberia, Guinea, Sierra Leone, Ivory Coast, Burkina Faso, Ghana, and Mali. The French admired Samori so much that they nicknamed him "The Black Napoleon". Zaiwulo comes in contact with this great man, who takes a liking to him. Samori sees in the child traces of his mother's world. To Zaiwulo, Samori embodies freedom, a man who elevates his followers, some of whom were once slaves, to rulers in the greatest African empire in the late-19th century. Zaiwulo follows Samori throughout his campaigns, fighting side by side with him, leading his armies, until the latter is captured and exiled by the French to present-day Gabon. Then Zaiwulo flees the French and returns to the forest, where he hopes to find clues to the secret that had led him to Musadu. What he finds has far-reaching consequences for his life.
- Zwart – Afro-Europese literatuur uit de Lage Landen (Black: Afro-European Literature from the Low Countries) (2018), a collection of essays and short stories by Black writers from The Netherlands and Belgium, edited by Sherif and Ebissé Rouw. ISBN 9789025451547

== Publications in English ==
- Vamba Sherif: Land of My Fathers. London, Hope Road, 2016. ISBN 9781908446497
- Vamba Sherif: Bound to Secrecy. London, Hope Road, 2015. ISBN 9781908446329
- Vamba Sherif: The Emperor's Son. Lehi, UT: Iskanchi, 2023. ISBN 9781957810102
