= Boawolohun =

Village in Lofa County, Liberia

Coordinates: 8.20556°N 10.12056°W

- Town
- Interactive map of Boawolohun
- Country: Liberia
- County: Lofa County
- District: Kolahun District
- Elevation: 516 m (1,693 ft)

Boawolohun is a small town in Kolahun District, Lofa County, Liberia. It is situated about 10 miles (16 km) from the city of Kolahun, the headquarters of the district. The town has a population of about 2,500 (2008 census).

== History ==
The town was established in the mid-18th century by Bombo Kollie. The current location of the town was established about 120 years ago after the cessation of intra-tribal faction which took the town from its original strategic (hilltop) location to its current location (flat land). Over the last century Boawolohun has served as a satellite city for adjourning villages and hamlets. In the earlier 70s when the town opened its first school, the school absolved most of the kids in the surrounding towns, villages and hamlets. Most of the first schoolchildren have gone onto greater achievement. This has helped to make the town a beacon of progressive and social changes for its surrounding neighbors.

This became more prevalent when Boawolohun was given a nickname Nehwalahun, or "Sweet Heaven" in the mid 70's. Despite the destruction of the civil war, it still lives up to its nickname today.

== Liberian Civil War ==
Like most towns and cities in Liberia, Boawolohun was greatly affected by the 14 years of civil war. The town lost most of its citizens and was almost reduced to a ghost town. Things have begun to pick up since the war ended; through the hard work of the youth of the town, Boawolohun opened its first 12-bedroom clinic five years ago. It is being run by a registered nurse. The school has also received infused funding as it contemplates raising itself to a full junior high school.
