= Beat the System =

Beat the System may refer to:

- Beat the System (band), a Malaysian/American rock band
- Beat the System (album), an album by Christian rock band Petra
- Beat the System, a 2011 EP by Alyson Stoner
- Beat the System, a record label, see The Fits
