= Mahaletchumy Arujanan =

Malaysian scientist

- மஹாலக்ஷ்மி அர்ஜுநன்
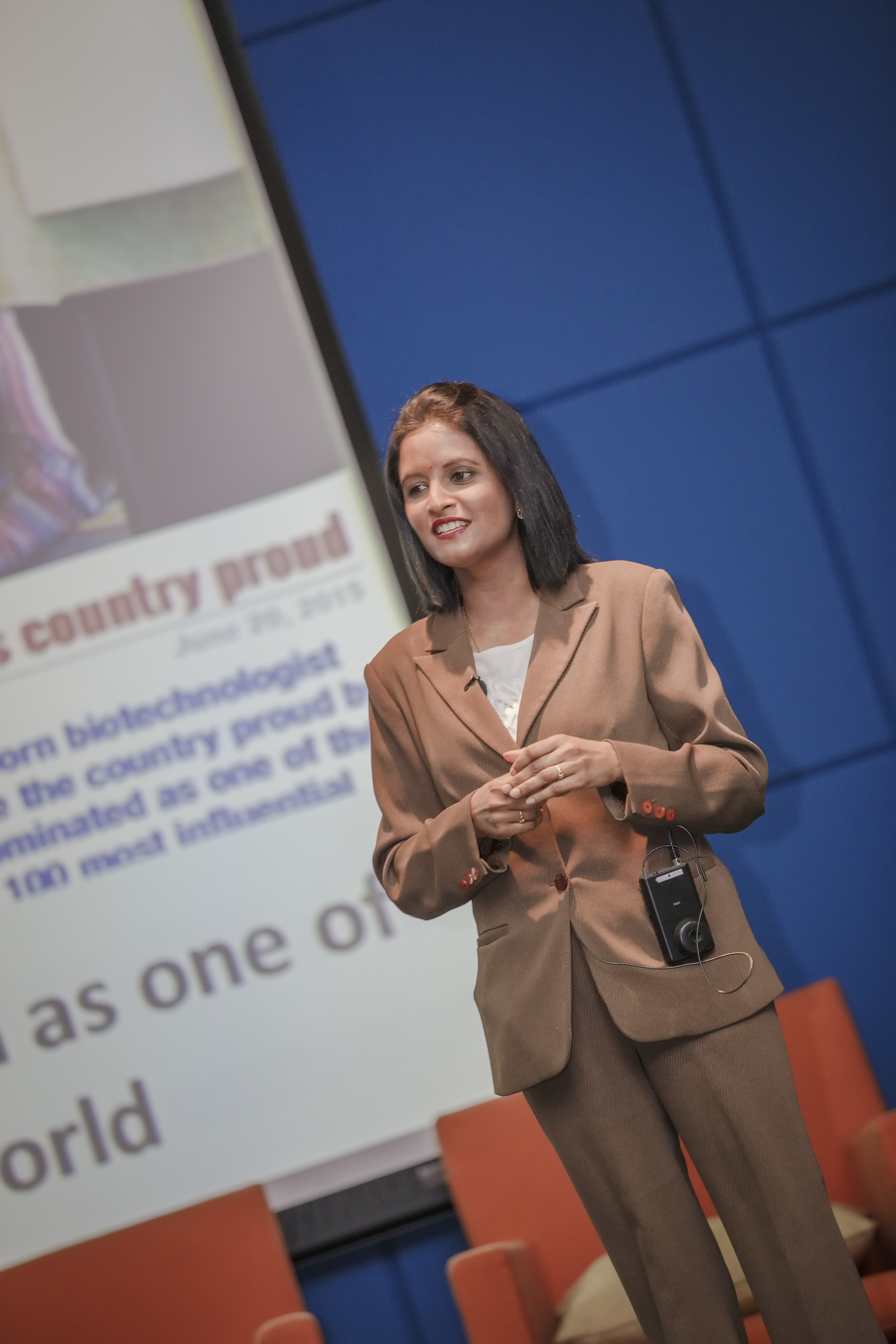
- Arujanan in Penang, Malaysia giving a talk on her career journey
- Born: 25 May 1969 (age 57); Klang Valley, Selangor, Malaysia
- Spouse: Selvamuthu Raja
- Children: 2 (Komalah & Deepa)
- Parent(s): Arujanan Periasamy and Mariyayee. S

Mahaletchumy Arujanan (Tamil: மஹாலக்ஷ்மி அர்ஜுநன்; born 25 May 1969) is an international recognised science communicator of Malaysian Indian origin. She works as the Global Coordinator of International Service for the Acquisition of Agribiotech Applications (ISAAA) and executive director of Malaysian Biotechnology Information Center (MABIC).

She is actively involved in science communication since 2003 but became a public figure in 2015 when she was listed as one of the 100 most influential people in the field of biotechnology by the 7th edition of The Scientific American Worldwide View: A Global Biotechnology Perspective Journal.

She studied in University Putra Malaysia (1989-1993), then in University of Malaya (1993-1997). In 1996, she started working In Sandoz Agro, a Swiss agrichemical company while completing her Masters.

Her journey to become a prominent science communicator is said to be a path of struggle, passion and dedication. Between 1996 - 2002, she worked in four different organisations and companies before finding her calling for science communication when she joined the Malaysian Biotechnology Information Centre (MABIC) in Jan 2003 as a project officer. Mahaletchumy took over as the executive director in May 2005 where she felt strongly that communicating science to all stakeholders will solve many issues as science is in everything. This also expanded her role internationally.

In 2008, she joined University of Malaya to pursue a PhD in science communication, being the first Malaysian to pursue a PhD in this field. As part of her initiative to democratise science and remove the elitism often linked to science, she founded the country's first biotechnology newspaper, The Petri Dish. She created many platforms to engage a wide range of stakeholders to raise their understanding of science. As the Executive Directors of MABIC, her work aims to create a science literate society; promote STEM education and careers to students; influence science-based policies and regulations; and make science communication a mainstream discipline. All her contributions in science communication earned her a number of accolades and also made her a sought after international speaker. This includes speaking at the EU Parliament in 2016 on the need for EU to address concerns related to genetically modified crops in a science-based manner.

Mahaletchumy is a regular speaker at the Agri-biotechnology and Biosafety Communication Symposium (ABBC) since the first ABBC in 2015 in Nairobi, Kenya. In 2017, she spoke at the ABBC in Uganda urging lawmakers to pass their Biosafety Bill as adoption of agribiotechnology safeguards livelihood. In 2019, Mahaletchumy underscored the need for Africa's growing population to tap into the prospects offered by emerging technologies such genome editing at the 3rd ABBC in Pretoria, South Africa. In 2021, in the 4th ABBC held virtually, Mahaletchumy lauded Africa for continued growth in number of countries adopting biotech crops. In 2023, ABBC, held in Nairobi, Kenya, Mahaletchumy voiced out that the 30 years of communication about GMOs have been marred by glaring mistakes such as over-claims, inward engagements (not engaging opponents) and low social media footprint.

Mahaletchumy also visits Pakistan regularly to support their adoption of agribiotechnology and to train scientists, regulators, policymakers, and journalists on effective communication. She actively contributed towards the development of biotechnology in the Muslim world to support equality and inclusiveness. Mahaletchumy organised a workshop in Malaysia to address the Challenges of Communicating Agribiotechnology in Muslim Countries.

In 2018, Mahaletchumy established the Asian Short Course in Agribiotechnology and Biosafety (ASCA), an annual short course for biosafety regulators, scientists, industry players and even the media to support science-based policy making, agile regulations that support emerging technologies. bridging the gap between media and scientists, and where youth are inspired to pursue STEM education and career.

Mahaletchumy was listed as one of the 100 most influential persons in biotechnology by Scientific American WorldView in 2015. She is a recipient of 2010 TWAS Regional Prize for Public Understanding of Science for East, Southeast Asia, and Pacific Region, and has been listed as one of the prominent women in biotechnology law and regulations by Biotechnology Law Report. She was recognized as one of the Great Women of Our Time by the Malaysian Women's Weekly in their December 2015 issue.

== Early life and education ==
Mahaletchumy was born in Klang Valley, Malaysia to a Tamil school headmaster, Arujanan Periasamy who emphasised the importance of education to her. He played a pivotal role in shaping her determination and resilience, and create her legacy. She spoke about him passionately in her interview with New Straits Times and the Malay Mail. She has four siblings and her mother was a housewife.

Mahaletchumy started her primary and secondary education at Convent Klang and continued her pre-university (STPM) at ACS Klang. She pursued her bachelor's degree in University Putra Malaysia, majoring in Microbiology and graduated in 1993. She continued her Masters in Biotechnology at University of Malaya and graduated in 1997. Realising the knowledge barrier between scientists and non-technical stakeholders, Mahaletchumy decided to pursue her PhD in Science Communication, becoming the 1st to do so in Malaysia.

== Career ==
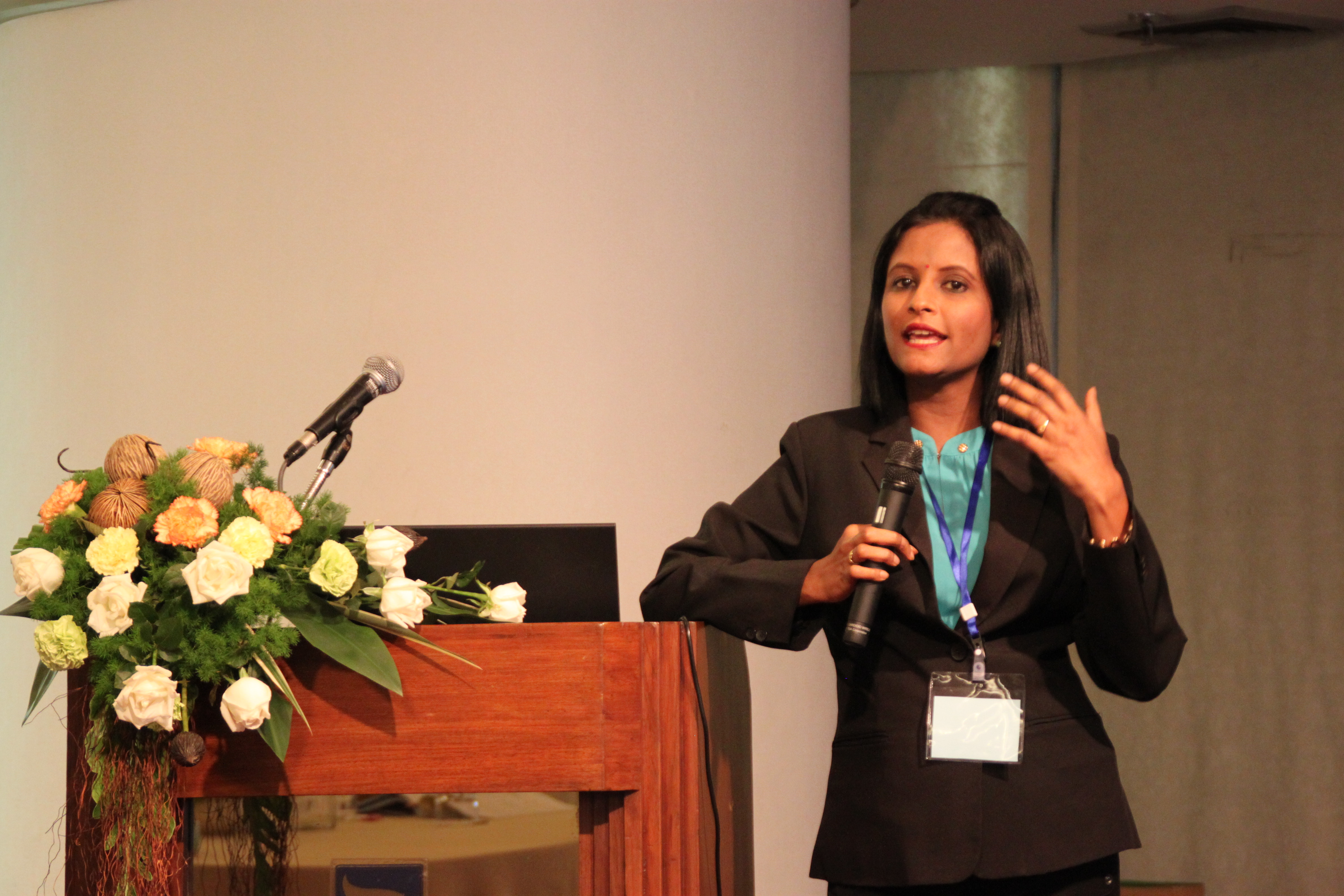
Arujanan giving a talk at a workshop in Chiang Rai, Thailand on communicating agribiotechnology

Mahaletchumy started her career as a Technical and Admin Officer with Sandoz Agro Chemicals in 1992. Her stint at Sandoz did not last long as the company merged with Ciba Geigy and the regional office she was working was closed. She joined The International Plant Genetic Resources Institute, now known as Bioversity International as a Programme Officer. She left after 2 years to join the healthcare company DXN. Mahaletchumy left DXN and joined Total Health Concept. 1999 to 2002, Arujanan was struggling to build a career and finally left Total Health Concept in 2002.

She joined the Malaysian Biotechnology Information Centre (MABIC) in January 2003 as a Project Officer and was promoted to be the Executive Director in May 2005. Mahaletchumy revamped MABIC, made efforts to introduce the centre to key ministries and government agencies, and forged a strong relationship with international partners. She started engaging with various stakeholders to create awareness on biotechnology. This led her to be a pioneer in science communication in Malaysia. She was appointed the Global Coordinator of ISAAA on 1 May 2019. She is currently responsible for the entire network of ISAAA that has its presence in South East Asia, South Asia, East Asia, Africa, USA, and Latin America.

Mahaletchumy's involvement in many areas of science communication includes influencing policies and regulations; inspiring students to pursue STEM education; ensuring science is commercialised; adoption of emerging technologies that attract public concerns such as genetic modification, gene editing, cell therapy and novel foods; alleviating risk-averse attitude among investors; raising public understanding of science to empower them to make informed decisions; and ensuring religious leaders are informed about bioethical issues.

Mahaletchumy's advocacy initiatives across academia, industry, government, and intergovernmental organizations earned her many roles. She sits on the Selangor Bio advisory Council to provide advice on biotechnology development in the state; and Board Member of the Malaysia Board of Technologists (MBOT). In the academic sector she serves as the Adjunct Lecturer for UCSI, Monash University Malaysia, and AIMST University; and a member of Industry Advisory Panel for QUEST International University Perak. She serves in the editorial board member of Estidotmy, an online science publication to bring science and maths closer to society.

Mahaletchumy is also on the advisory board for Cornell Alliance for Science, Farming Future Bangladesh, Genetic Literacy Project (USA) and Mustafa Science and Technology Foundation for women.

She also served UN FAO as its International Consultant on Strategy for Public Participation and Outreach for Sri Lanka from 2019-2022.

Mahaletchumy plays an active role as a trainer/consultant for talent development in STEM for the Malaysian Bioeconomy Corporation, Industry Cluster of Excellence, Ministry of Higher Education Malaysia, and Khazanah GIFT programme that aims to help graduates to accelerate in their career.

=== The Petri Dish ===
Mahaletchumy is the founding editor-in-chief for the first science newspaper in Malaysia, The Petri Dish. The newspaper was initiated to bring biotechnology/science to the public domain.

The newspaper started as a 12-page monthly in February 2011 with a circulation of 2,000 copies and has grown into a 20-page publication with 20,000 copies circulated to key stakeholders in the fields of science/biotechnology in Malaysia. With a strong belief that science should reach the public, Mahaletchumy made efforts to circulate The Petri Dish to shopping malls, private hospitals, Starbucks outlets, ministries and government agencies related to science, hotels, Malaysian airports, Parliament library and selected car service centres. In Feb 2017, Arujanan created an online portal for The Petri Dish.

== Contributions ==
=== Biotechnology/Science communication ===
1. Mahaletchumy established the Science Communication Advisory Committee under COMSTECH in 2023 to build a strong science communication strategy in the OIC member states. She is the international advisor for this initiative.
2. She co-founded the Science Media Centre Malaysia, emulating Science Media Centre UK in 2019 with an award winning journalist, Tan Su Lin with an aim to promote accurate and evidence-based reporting especially on complex or controversial science issues in the media.
3. Mahaletchumy's expertise in science communication was also leveraged by Nature Masterclass where she was an expert who delivered modules for scientific communities on effective ways to communicate their research.
4. Mahaletchumy initiated several dialogues between scientists and ulama (Islamic scholars) to bridge the knowledge gap between the two groups. Despite being non-Muslim, she immensely contributed towards Muslim countries by creating awareness on agriculture biotechnology and food security. Her initiatives translate into the adoption of a resolution urging Muslim countries to adopt agriculture biotechnology. This is being used as a reference in Muslim countries.
5. Mahaletchumy introduced various non-traditional approaches to bring biotechnology to the public. One of it was through a fashion show. This was later adopted by her Kenyan counterpart.
6. Mahaletchumy also introduced a carnival concept to create awareness on biotechnology to school students by engaging them with public speaking, debates, quiz, poster drawing and coloring competitions
7. Mahaletchumy was also very actively involved in advocating for a balanced biosafety regulation. She organized several conferences and seminars to create awareness among Malaysian and Asian scientists, policymakers, regulators and industry players on the need for a science-based biosafety regulation.
8. Mahaletchumy is a regular speaker around the world where she promotes agribiotechnology as a tool to ensure food security, alleviate poverty among farmers and sustainable development
9. Mahaletchumy also founded the Asian Short Course on Agribiotechnology, Biosafety Regulations, and Communication (ASCA) in 2018 to create a capacity building platform for Asian policymakers and regulators in modern Agribiotechnology, a multidisciplinary sector that involves international and national law, the science of modern biotechnology, socioeconomics, risk assessment, and management and communication. ASCA allows Asian stakeholders to upscale themselves in these areas without having to seek for training in the USA.

=== Uplifting of the Malaysian Indian community ===
Mahaletchumy is an active speaker at schools and community events. in 2023, she made The Petri Dish accessible to 525 Tamil schools in Malaysia through a funding she received from the Malaysian Indian Transformation Unit. She introduced a 4-page pull-out in Tamil language, called Ariviyal Ainthiram to expose around 80,000 primary school students to the latest STEM developments with an aim to future-proof them in the fields of STEM.

== Roles and awards ==
Official positions
Global Coordinator	ISAAA
Executive Director	Malaysian Biotechnology Information Centre
Editor-in-Chief	The Petri Dish
International Consultant on Strategy for Public Participation and Outreach	UN FAO (Sri Lanka)
Awards/Nominations
Wiki Impact	100 changemakers creating real impact in Malaysia, 2024
Tatler	Asia's Most Influential 2023
Wiki Impact	Women Empowerment 2022
Finalist Women of the Future SEA 2019 (mentor)	Women of the Future Awards SEA (2019)
Scientific American WorldView 2015	100 Most influential person in biotechnology in the world (2015)
Women in Biotechnology Law and Regulation	Biotechnology Law Report, Mary Ann Liebert (2015)
Great Women of our Time	Malaysian Women's Weekly (2015)
Regional Prize for Public Understanding of Science	Third World Academy of Science (2010)

== Work ==
=== Publications ===
Her selected publications:

- Arujanan, M. Effective Communication Strategies for Stakeholder Acceptance of New Technologies in Agri-food Systems (2024) in Food Security Issues in Asia. Paul Teng (editor) https://doi.org/10.1142/13469
- Jones, M.G.K.; Fosu-Nyarko, J.; Iqbal, S.; Adeel, M.; Romero-Aldemita, R.; Arujanan, M.; Kasai, M.;Wei, X.; Prasetya, B.; Nugroho, S.; et al. Enabling Trade in Gene-Edited Produce in Asia and Australasia: The Developing Regulatory Landscape and Future Perspectives. Plants (2022), 11, 2538. https://doi.org/10.3390/plants11192538
- Arujanan, M. (2021) Communicating Genome Editing: Editing the Bloopers from the Past Science Communication Strategies. In. ISAAA. Breaking Barriers with Breeding: A Primer on New Breeding Innovations for Food security. ISAAA Brief No. 56. ISAAA: Ithaca, NY.
- ·Arujanan, M., Shamsuddin, S and Nadzri, F. (2020). Malaysia: Science Communication in a Pluralistic Society. Toss Gascoigne, et al. (editor), The emergence of modern science communication, ANU Press DOI: http://doi.org/10.22459/CS.2020
- Arujanan, M. and Teng, P. (2017). Legal, Regulatory and Labelling Status of Biotech Crops. pp 46–89. In. Advances in Botanical Research Vol. 86. Eds Jean-Pierre Jacquot and Pierre Gadal. Academic Press Publication. https://doi.org/10.1016/bs.abr.2017.11.019
- Arujanan, M. and Singaram, M. (2017). Biotechnology and Bioeconomy Landscape in Malaysia. New Biotechnology. Doi: 10.1016/j.nbt.2017.06.004. Elsevier.
- Arujanan, M. (2017). Genetically Engineered Crops: Fake News Disappointments. Inter Press Service. News Agency. http://www.ipsnews.net/2017/05/genetically-engineered-crops-fake-news-disappointments/ June 1, 2017.
- Arujanan, M. (2017). March for Science: Agony and Ecstasy of a Malaysian Agricultural Biotechnology Communicator. Genetic Literacy Project. https://www.geneticliteracyproject.org/2017/04/21/march-science-agony-ecstasy-malaysian-agricultural-biotechnology-science-communicator/ April 21, 2017
- Arujanan, M. (2017). Unlocking Asia’s potential in agribiotechnology. Genetic Literacy Project. https://www.geneticliteracyproject.org/2017/02/21/asian-agrobiotechnology-slowed-private-public-sector-tensions-ngo-activism/ Feb 21, 2017
