= Margaret Karembu =

Kenyan science communication specialist and biotechnology advocate

Margaret Gathoni Karembu
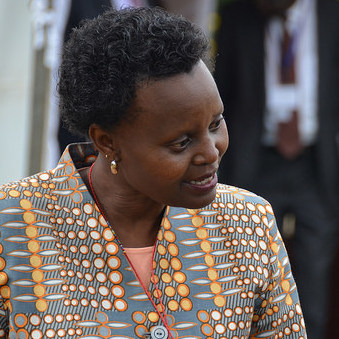
- Education: Ph.D (Environmental Science Education); Master’s Degree (Education)
- Alma mater: Kenyatta University (PhD); Meru University of Science and Technology (MA)
- Scientific career
- Fields: Agri-biotech
- Workplaces: International Service for the Acquisition of Agri-biotech Applications (Director); Kenyatta University (Lecturer)
- Thesis: Contribution of Primary schools towards Environmental Enhancement in Kenya. The case of Kiambu District. (2002)
- Doctoral advisor: Richard Kimutai Kerich

Margaret Gathoni Karembu is a Kenyan science educator and science management specialist in the fields of technology transfer and the applications of biotechnology in Africa. She is the Director of the AfriCenter division of the ISAAA, a non-profit international organization that shares agricultural biotechnology, focusing on genetic engineering. She is the chair of the Open Forum on Agricultural Biotechnology Programming Committee, Kenya Chapter.

Her responsibilities at the ISAAA include planning and managing all aspects of the AfriCenter programmes that include the transfer of agri-biotechnologies between industrialised and developing countries. She is also involved in the spreading of information on modern agricultural biotechnology to encourage informed decisions about contentious issues such as GMO's.

She previously served as Council chair and vice-chair of the Cooperative University College of Kenya and Meru University of Science and Technology respectively.

In December 2000, her project, involving the evaluation and transfer of tissue culture banana technology, was awarded the First Research Medal in the Global Development Network (GDN) awards for ‘Science and Technology for Development’ sponsored by the Government of Japan and the World Bank.

== Education and career ==
From 1992 to 2002 Karembu was a Senior Lecturer at Kenyatta University, Kenya. During this time she gained wide experience in technology diffusion research on small-scale agriculture. In 2000 her project involving the evaluation and transfer of tissue culture banana technology to the benefit of more than 5,000 farmers in East Africa was awarded the First Research Medal in the Global Development Network (GDN) awards for ‘Science and Technology for Development’ sponsored by the Government of Japan and the World Bank.

In 2002 she was awarded a PhD in Environmental Science Education with a thesis entitled: "Contribution of Primary schools towards Environmental Enhancement in Kenya. The case of Kiambu District.". In 2003 she joined the ISAAA.

In 2008 she completed the Science, Technology and Innovation Policy Course at Kennedy School of Executive Education, Harvard University. In 2011 she attended the Strategic Leadership and Change Management for Directors of State Corporations at the Kenya Institute of Administration and the USAID's Champions for Change Leadership Course. In 2015 she attended Cornell University's Alliance for Science - Biotechnology Leadership Course.

She coordinates ISAAA's Biotechnology Information Centers in Africa which provide information in English, Swahili and French.

== Activism ==
Karembu has long been an active promotor of biotechnology. In 2001, as a staff member of the Kenyatta University, she was interviewed by New Scientist magazine regarding the propaganda from certain green organisations about biotechnology in Europe that has led to obstruction of attempts to combat hunger in Africa. "We don't get data, we get opinions," Karembu said in the interview.

In 2014 she wrote an opinion piece for the International Food Policy Research Institute published on SciDev.net entitled: The problems with the arguments against GM crops in which she pointed out that by 2013 more than 18 million farmers (at least 90 per cent of which were small-scale resource-poor farmers in developing countries) had chosen to use genetically modified crops on more than 175 million hectares of farmland. "New evidence shows that arguments against GM crops are unfounded", says Margaret Karembu. “Contrary to widely held opinion that GM technology will only benefit multi-nationals and is meant for large-scale farmers, the latest trends reveal otherwise.”

Karembu has actively promoted low-environmental impact methods, biotechnology sharing and genetically modified organisms as part of her work, by writing papers, presenting at conferences, writing two books for children presenting the case for genetically modified crops and in many interviews. In an interview with The Kenya Standard she said that "...linkages of GMOs to cancer are misplaced [and] ... even rural residents who eat traditional foods are succumbing to cancer.... The association of GMOs to cancer is partly caused by faulty studies that attempt to create an association.... It is important for scientific and health experts to come out and clarify these scares."

Karembu also sees public-private partnerships as one of the important elements in providing biotechnology to Africa.

Karembu presented during the first Global Congress on Scientific Thinking and Action that was held March 17-20, 2021. During Session VI: Food Biotechnology, she said that the voices of African scientists have been overshadowed by those of human rights activists who are opposed to GMOs. She urged that it is important not to over-claim what GMOs can do and choose the right communication platform. The presentation can be found on the Aspen Institute website.

== Selected publications ==
Karembu has authored or co-authored several books, papers and policy briefs, including:

- Karembu, M.; Nguthi, F.N.; Kenya, E. (2009). Open Forum on Agricultural Biotechnology in Africa (OFAB): Experiences in Sharing Knowledge and Information on Agricultural Biotechnology : Report for September 2007-November 2008. ISAAA AfriCenter.
- Karembu, Margaret; Njunguna, Michael (2013). "10. Institutional Issues in Biotechnology applications: Concepts and empirical evidence from Kenya". In Qaim, M.; Krattiger, A.F.; von Braun, J. (eds.). Agricultural Biotechnology in Developing Countries: Towards Optimizing the Benefits for the Poor. Springer US. ISBN 978-1-4757-3178-1.
- Karembu, Margaret Gathoni (2002). Small Scale Farmers'Adoptive Responses to Banana Biotechnology in Kenya: Implications for Policy (PDF). Kenya: The African Technology Policy Studies Network. p. 28. ISBN 9966-916-06-7.
- Karembu, M.; Nguthi, F.; Ismail, H. (2009). Biotech crops for Africa: The final frontier (PDF). Kenya: ISAAA. p. 40.

== See also ==
- GMO conspiracy theories
