= Chandran Nair =

Singaporean poet (1945–2023)

- Born: 1945; Kerala, India
- Died: 18 September 2023 (aged 77–78); Montigny-le-Bretonneux, France
- Occupation: Poet
- Parent: V. R. Gopala Pillai (father)
- Website: https://www.poetry.sg/chandran-nair-again-thinking

Chandran Nair (1945 – 18 September 2023) was a poet, director, and mediator at UNESCO. Born in India, he spent most of his life living and writing in Singapore. He died in Montigny-le-Bretonneux, a suburb of Paris, France, where he had relocated for his work with UNESCO.

He wrote poetry, in collections such as Once the Horsemen and Other Poems and was the founder of the Society of Singapore Writers.

== Biography ==
=== Background ===
Chandran Nair was born in Kerala, India, in 1945. He moved to Singapore at the age of seven. His father, Villayil Raman Gopala Pillai, wrote short stories and novels in Malayalam under the pen name Njekkad, and emigrated to Singapore in 1947.

In 1973, Chandran Nair married Ivy Goh Pek Kien. Nair studied at Raffles Institution and the University of Singapore, where he earned a Master's degree in Science (marine biology) and a Diploma in fisheries (with distinction). However, after graduating, he pursued a career in publishing. He later worked as an international civil servant with UNESCO, first in Karachi (1981–1985), where he began painting, and then in Paris (1985–2004), where he resided.

=== Career ===
Nair began writing at an early age, with his first poems published in The Rafflesian, his school magazine, in 1963. His first poetry collection, Once the Horsemen and Other Poems (University Education Press, Singapore), was published in 1972 and was well received, as was his second collection, After the Hard Hours, This Rain (Woodrose Publications, Singapore, 1975). He co-translated The Poems and Lyrics of the Last Lord Lee, the Last Emperor of the Southern Tang Dynasty (Woodrose Publications, Singapore, 1975) with Malcolm Koh Ho Ping.

In 1973, Nair won The New Nation Singapore Short Story Writing Contest and published his stories in Short Stories from Africa and Asia, which he co-edited with Theo Luzuka. He also edited Singapore Writing (1977) for the Society of Singapore Writers and contributed to Singapore Short Stories (Vol. 1), edited by Robert Yeo. His stories also appeared in translation in Malay in Cerpen Cerpen Asean (Dewan Bahasa dan Pustaka).

Nair served as the founding President of the Society of Singapore Writers from 1976 to 1981.

After moving to Paris, Nair continued painting and writing, though he did not publish any new works. However, his poetry was included in several anthologies, such as Calling of the Kindred (Cambridge University Press, 1993) and Reworlding, an anthology reviewing the works of expatriate Indian writers, edited by Emmanuel S. Nelson (Greenwood Press, New York, 1992). His work was also included in Idea to Ideal (FirstFruits, Singapore, 2004), where 12 Singaporean poets discussed their work (edited by Felix Cheong) and in Journeys: An Anthology of Singapore Poetry, edited by Edwin Thumboo (1995).

His poem "Grandfather" has been used in examination papers by the University of Cambridge International Examinations Board.

During a discussion on the multiracial nature of modern Singapore, Chiang Hai Ding, MP for Ulu Pandan in the Parliament of Singapore, said: "Where else but in Singapore can we find an ethnic Indian, born in India, educated in Singapore, holding a Science degree from the University of Singapore (a Master's degree in Marine Biology) and writing beautiful love poems to his ethnic Chinese wife in an English-language magazine? I do not propose to read out his poems today, but in view of the forthcoming visit of our Foreign Minister to Peking, perhaps Mr. Speaker and hon. Members will bear with me as I read three lines:

To the east where there is sunshine
The Mind must turn for the beginning
of the World, in which only love matters.

(Chandran Nair, Her World, February 1975, p. 27)

=== Personal life and death ===
Nair was married to Ivy Goh Nair, and together they had three daughters. He died from a heart attack in Montigny-le-Bretonneux, France, on 18 September 2023.

== Works ==
=== Poetry collections ===
- Once the Horsemen and Other Poems (1972, University Education Press)
- After the Hard Hours, This Rain (1975, Woodrose Publications)
- Reaching for Stones: Collected Poems (1963-2009) (2010, Ethos Books) ISBN 9789810867171

=== Anthologies (editor) ===
- Singapore Writing (1977, Woodrose Publications for the Society of Singapore Writers)
- Short Stories from Africa and Asia (co-editor; 1976, Woodrose Publications)

=== Non-Fiction ===
- Book Promotion, Sales and Distribution, Management Training Course (1987)
- Dismantling Global White Privilege: Equity for a Post-Western World (2022)

=== Translations ===
- The Poems & Lyrics of Last Lord Lee: A Translation (co-translator; 1975, Woodrose Publications)

=== Reviews ===
Nair's poetry was commented upon by local as well as foreign reviewers.

Ban Kah Choon remarked on Once the Horsemen and Other Poems:

". . . But this is an important book of poems. Its themes are human ones, its scenes those we can recognize, its mythology ours. And Mr Nair handles it all adroitly. Many foreigners sneer at local poetry, talking of its lack of skill (as if that is the only thing that matters) and residing in the weather-beaten towers of Eliot, Yeats and Dylan Thomas. For them, I offer Mr Nair's volume of poems. It should be interesting to see his future development. We have a strong and unafraid voice among us."

Kirpal Singh reviewed Staying Close but Breaking free: Indian writers in Singapore:

". . . of all the Indians writing in English in Singapore, it is Chandran Nair, I believe, who may be said to be the most "Indian" in terms of literary expression. His two collections of poetry, Once the Horsemen and other Poems (1972) and After the Hard Hours this Rain (1975), reveal fairly explicit references to Indian myths, legends, landscape and spirituality. In an early poem 'Grandfather' written for his grandfather, Nair clearly registers the Indian nostalgia felt deeply in contemplation. The poem is suggestive also of the position Nair himself seems to have adopted in relation to living in an environment which does not always appreciate the commitment of becoming a sensitive soul." (Reworlding: The Literature of the Indian Diaspora, edited by Emmanuel S Nelson.)

Hariharan Poonjar said in response to Malayali Rebel in Singapore:

". . . Chandran is no juggler of words. He dives to the existential core of an experience and describes it without ornamentation and verbal fat. The basic struggle of a psyche responding to the pressures of an intense search for a personality that is rooted in the present—in one's own present—bristles in each line written by this promising poet."

Nirmala D Govindasamy review of Chandran Nair: An Appraisal mentioned that:

". . . Chandran Nair is obviously a master of words. His acuteness of observation and accuracy of detail when it comes to metaphorical allusions are admirable. Even if one is dissatisfied with his handling of themes, his handling of words distinguishes him as a skilled craftsman."

Nallama Jenstad said on Once the Horsemen and Other Poems:

". . . Chandran Nair's poetry is good—amazingly good. First, even from a purely sociological point of view, one sees through his imagery all the varied influences of this Malaysian/Singaporean Indian and watches as the influences struggle to form, not a "Revolving Man" but a real "person". One sees the background of Hinduism work side by side with Christianity, one watches the Chinese/Malay and "other" influences on his Indianness, from page to page and from poem to poem. It is very interesting reading—but even more, it is so forcefully well-written."

Edwin Thumboo wrote in his Introduction to the Second Tongue:

". . . Much of Chandran Nair's poetry is exploration. Once the Horsemen (1972) communicates the variety of Nair's poetic world and the note of urgency with which he attempts his themes. Image and metaphor abound and are part and parcel of "the wrestle with experience". For the raid into the articulate to achieve what Shelley called "new materials of knowledge" amounts to an essential self-understanding to harmonise the ways to thought and feeling. By taking many themes as grist for his maw, Nair's poetry ranges over the feelings of a Hindu bride to the Roman Emperor, Caligula. The simultaneous forays into life and language and the myths and legends of East and West, have strengthened and extended the coordinating power of Nair's idiom."

Ban Kah Choon discussed After the Hard Hours this Rain:

". . . For those of us who remember Chandran Nair's first book of poems (Once the Horsemen, 1972), impressed with its versatility and hard brilliance of style, a second offering of poems from any poet is another matter. . . we are worried about the poet's development, we search for those unhealthy signs that indicate a falling into the cliched and routined. . . If we are inclined to such ungenerous thought, Chandran Nair's new volume, After the Hard Hours this Rain sets our minds at ease. Our poet is as articulately tough as ever. . ."

== Awards ==
- New Nation Short Story Contest, First Prize for Leta, 1973
- University of Singapore Students' Union Silver Medal for Outstanding Work, 1969

== See also ==
- List of Nairs
