= Felix Cheong =

Singaporean Policeman and Dancer

- Occupations: Poet, Novelist
- Writing career
- Language: English
- Genres: Young adult fiction, poetry

Felix Cheong (born 1965, Singapore) is a Singaporean author and poet. He received the National Arts Council Young Artist Award for Literature in 2000. Cheong has written over 30 books across genres including poetry, young adult fiction, and graphic novels.

== Early life and education ==
Cheong spent his early childhood years in a kampong in Lorong 3, Geylang. He has one older brother and two younger brothers. Born to two Catholic parents, Cheong has described Catholicism as having a profound impact on his writing.

Cheong attended St. Anthony's Boys' School and represented the school in table tennis. He then attended St. Joseph's Institution, where he was a member of the school band and the Literary, Drama and Debate Society.

In 1990, Cheong graduated from the National University of Singapore with a Bachelor of Arts (Honors) in English Literature and Philosophy, and a minor in English Language. In June 2002, he completed his Masters of Philosophy in Creative Writing at the University of Queensland on a bursary awarded by the National Arts Council.

== Career ==
Cheong started his career as a broadcast journalist with the then-Singapore Broadcasting Corporation, where he worked for two years. He then joined CNBC Asia as a studio director for close to eight years. He later embarked on a freelance writing career before becoming a teacher. He has since taught at institutions such as LaSalle College, University of Newcastle, and the National University of Singapore.

Cheong's first collection of poetry, Temptation and Other Poems (ISBN 978-981-3065-17-8) was published in 1998 followed by a second collection in 1999, I Watch the Stars Go Out (ISBN 978-981-04-1127-5), Broken by the Rain (ISBN 978-981-04-8033-2) in 2003, and Sudden in Youth: New and Selected Poems (ISBN 978-981-08-3412-8) in 2009.

Cheong has written two young adult fiction books used as part of a national education campaign – The Call From Crying House (ISBN 978-981-4189-05-7) and its sequel, The Woman In The Last Carriage (ISBN 978-981-4189-11-8).

Cheong won the National Arts Council's Young Artist of the Year for Literature Award in 2000 and the poetry slam at the Hong Kong International Literary Festival in 2004.

His poems have been featured in various projects, including Singapore Poetry on the Sidewalks in 2016 and Poems on the MRT.

== Selected publications ==
=== Poetry ===
- The Mischief of Ordinary Things (2024, Marshall Cavendish Editions) ISBN 978-981-5169-18-8
- B-SIDES AND BACKSLIDES: 1986 -2018 (2018, Math Paper Press) ISBN 978-981-11-7304-2
- Broken by the Rain (2003, Firstfruits) ISBN 978-981-04-8033-2
- I Watch the Stars Go Out (1999, Ethos Books) ISBN 978-981-04-1127-5
- Temptation, and Other Poems (1998, Landmark Books) ISBN 978-981-3065-17-8

=== Fiction ===
- Singapore Siu Dai 2: The SG Conversation Upsize! (2014, Ethos Books) ISBN 978-981-09-2549-9
- Singapore Siu Dai: The SG Conversation In A Cup (2014, Ethos Books) ISBN 978-981-07-8858-2
- Vanishing Point (2012, Ethos Books) ISBN 978-981-07-3386-5
- Sudden in Youth: New & Selected Poems (2009, Ethos Books) ISBN 978-981-08-3412-8
- The Woman in the Last Carriage (2007, Landmark Books) ISBN 978-981-4189-11-8
- The Call from the Crying House (2006, Landmark Books) ISBN 978-981-4189-05-7
- Different (2005, Ethos Books) ISBN 978-981-05-3765-4
- Idea to Ideal: 12 Singapore Poets on the Writing of their Poems (editor; 2004, Firstfruits) ISBN 978-981-05-1686-4

=== Graphic novels ===
- The Showgirl and the Minister (2023, Penguin Random House SEA) ISBN 978-981-5144-31-4
- Goh Keng Swee: A Singaporean for All Seasons (2023, Marshall Cavendish International) ISBN 978-981-5113-41-9
