= V. R. Gopala Pillai =

Singaporean novelist

Villayil Raman Gopala Pillai

Villayil Raman Gopala Pillai (1915-1981) was a Singaporean novelist writing in Malayalam under the pen name G.P. Njekkad, after his natal village in Kerala.

== Background ==
Married to Bhargavi Pillai, he migrated to Singapore from Kerala, India in 1947. He had five children including Singaporean poet Chandran Nair.

Pillai worked as a manager-cum-accountant for Cathay Advertising in Singapore. An only child, Pillai had a fairly good education despite family objections based on astrological beliefs. He was formally schooled up to the age of 12. Pillai was a self-taught man, reading feverishly all kinds of books (especially Bengali novels translated into Malayalam) from a young age. "An author or a novelist must be well-read before he attempts to write himself", he told "Asiaweek" in an interview in 1981.

== Career ==
As a teenager, Pillai had several short stories rejected but he persevered, writing lighter satires. His first published story in 1932 criticised the caste system. He wrote articles and short fiction until 1962, when his first novel was published. Entitled "Kaithapookal" (Tainted Flowers), it was set entirely in Kerala. This was followed by "Maruppachakal" (Barrier of Sand), "Vruthabhangam" (Unbalanced Life), "Thapasu" (Meditation), "Agniparvatham (Volcano),"Vazhiyariyathe" (Journey without Signs) and "Aavarthanam" (Repetition) which was a best-seller. Many of these novels dealt with human relationships interwoven with the social fabric and were set in Singapore. His last novel, "Chirakudal Chalanangal" (Wings and Movements), was serialised by Kerala's then leading weekly, "Mathrubhoomi" (Motherland).

Pillai is remembered in Kerala as a popular novelist. His nine novels, though mostly set in Singapore and Malaysia, appealed to Malayali readers because of their immigrant "rags-to-riches" leitmotif. His characters were mainly from Kerala but he often incorporated other communities, like the Chinese. Readers in relatively poor Kerala was exposed to a world very different from what they were accustomed to. That was the attraction of Pillai's novels.

Another leitmotif of Pillai's works was the evident feminism running throughout his works. "I am a woman's man; 75% to 90% of my characters are female", he told "Asiaweek"'s Jagjit Kaur Nagpal. Pillai displayed a sympathetic attitude in many of his works towards the plight of women. "The female character is always growing in my mind", he said, "her actions and everything about her"..."It is something (his feminism) very natural to me; it is a habit. For instance, if there are two persons in a race --a man and a woman-- my attention will automatically go to the woman!" He attempted to write against women once but in the end relented: His intention was to portray an unpleasant, grumbling female but his dedication finally read "to one who keeps honey in the heart and chili on the tongue".

Pillai died shortly after the interview with "Asiaweek" of a second heart attack at the age of 66. He was remembered and regretted by the local Keralan community in Singapore who lost their prominent Malayalam writer; one who managed to gain both critical appreciation and commercial success in India's highly competitive literary circles.

== Works ==
=== Novels ===
- "Kaithapookal" (Tainted Flowers), Writers' Cooperative, Kerala, 1962
- "Maruppachakal" (Barrier of Sand), Writers' Cooperative, Kerala,
- "Vruthabhangam" (Unbalanced Life), Writers' Cooperative, Kerala,
- "Thapasu" (Meditation), Writers' Cooperative, Kerala,
- "Agniparvatham (Volcano), Writers' Cooperative, Kerala,
- "Vazhiyariyathe" (Journey without Signs), Writers' Cooperative, Kerala,
- "Aavarthanam" (Repetition), Writers' Cooperative, Kerala,
- "Chirakudal Chalanangal" (Wings and Movements), Writers' Cooperative, Kerala,

== See also ==
- List of Nairs
