= Kolahun =

Village in Lofa county, Liberia

- Location in Liberia
- Coordinates: 8°15′57″N 10°5′27″W
- Country: Liberia
- County: Lofa County
- District: Kolahun District

Kolahun is a town in the Kolahun District of Lofa County, Liberia.
