= Ram Shanker =

Singaporean footballer

Personal information
- Full name: Ram Shanker Vijaya Mogan
- Date of birth: 17 June 1985 (age 41)
- Place of birth: Singapore
- Position: Midfielder

Team information
- Current team: Balestier Khalsa Football Club

Senior career*
Years	Team	Apps	(Gls)
2004	Young Lions	5	(2)
2005	Balestier Khalsa Football Club	22	(0)
- * Club domestic league appearances and goals

Ram Shanker Vijaya Mogan (born 17 June 1985 in Singapore) is a Singaporean footballer who plays for Balestier Khalsa Football Club. His short stint with the Young Lions only spanned a handful of substitute appearances in the S.League.
