= G. S. Sareen =

Singaporean businessman (born 1966)

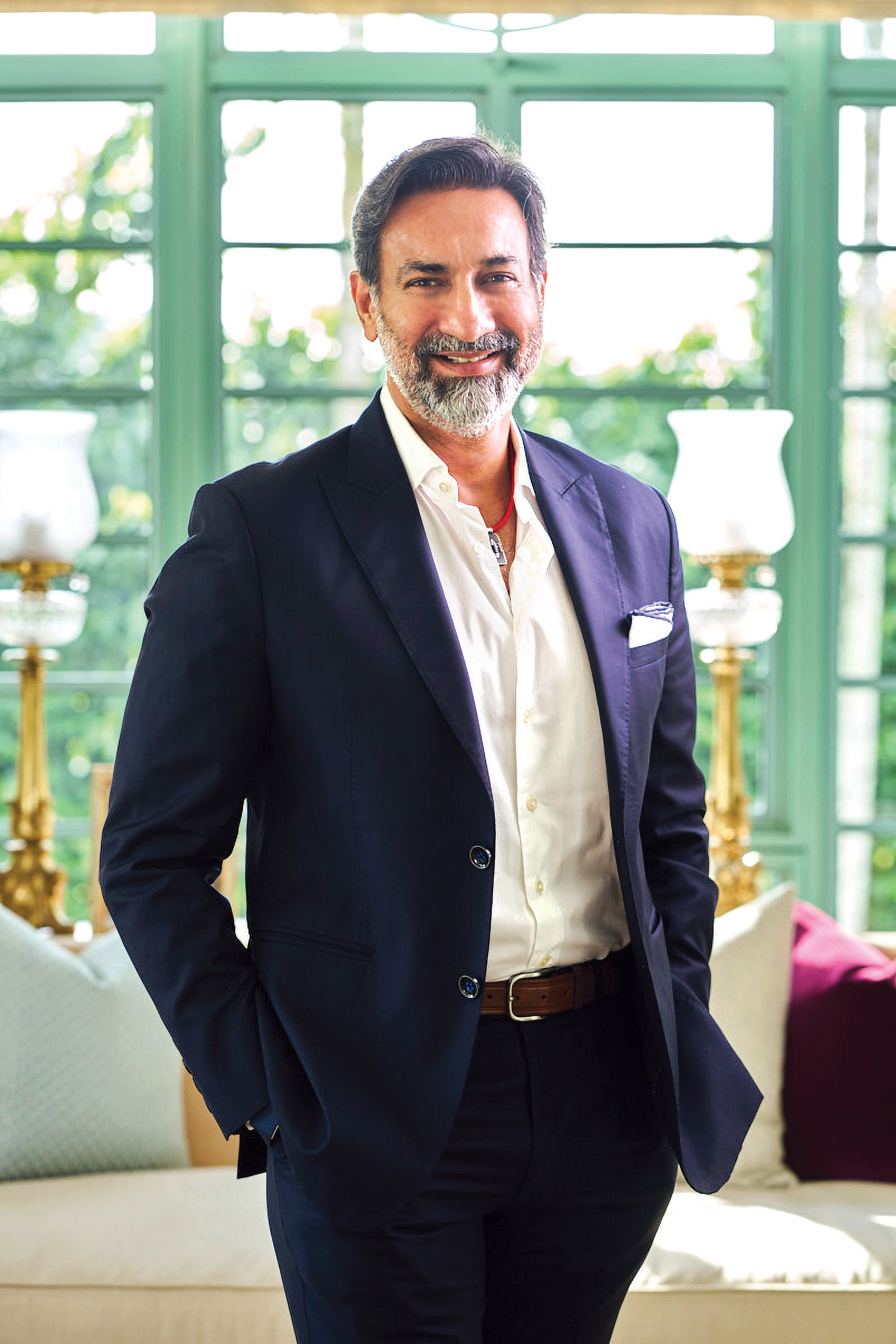
- Born: Gajendra Singh Sareen; 7 November 1966 (age 60); Madhya Pradesh, India
- Education: University of Bhopal; Indian Military Academy
- Spouse: Rewa Manmohan Singh Sareen (m. 1990)

Gajendra Singh Sareen (born 7 November 1966) is an Indian-Singaporean businessman, founder, CEO, and president of Singapore tire manufacturer and distributor, Omni United Pte. Ltd.

== Early life ==
Sareen was born on 7 November 1966 in Madhya Pradesh to an upper middle class family. He is the youngest of three siblings. His father, Dr Surender Singh Sareen, was a civil servant; his mother, Amrit Kaur Sareen, was paralyzed after being involved in an accident while visiting Africa. His brother, Paremendra Singh Sareen, died in a road accident in 1989 at the age of 27.

== Education ==
Sareen is an alumnus of Daly College Indore, Madhya Pradesh, India and holds a degree in Statistics from Bhopal University. He is also a decorated and distinguished member of the Indian Army. He joined the Indian Military Academy in 1986 and resigned his commission in 1992 to support his family. He was awarded a SENA MEDAL, a gallantry award for action, by the President of India during his tenure in the Army.

== Prior to Omni United career information/details ==
Omni United is Sareen's third business venture. Prior to its founding, he was an early entrepreneur in the online e-commerce industry. He launched, managed and subsequently sold mindtrac.com, one of the first B2B online market exchanges in the tire industry, backed by JP Morgan. Sareen launched mindtrac.com having gained previous knowledge of the market through various trading ventures throughout Asia and the USA.

== Omni United Pte. Ltd ==
Under Sareen's direction, Omni United sells in excess of 5 million units of passenger and light truck tires a year in 80 countries. Omni United's manufacturing partners are located in the China, India, Thailand and Serbia. In October 2015 Sareen purchased Interstate Tire Distributor (ITD), a California-based wholesaler. In June 2016, Sareen made his second acquisition with the purchase of Texas-based A to Z Tire & Battery, Inc. That part of the business has since been renamed Radar Tires, Inc.

=== Timberland Tires ===
Introduced in November, 2014, Timberland Tires were born out of an idea between Sareen and global lifestyle brand Timberland. The tires feature a rubber formulation that is appropriate for the recycling of the tires at the end of their useful life into outsoles for Timberland shoes.

Timberland Tires received recognition from some of the most influential organizations in the world for collaboration, innovation and sustainability. In May 2016, Timberland Tires won the WGSN Futures award in the category of Sustainable Design. Timberland Tires were also finalists of the 2016 Guardian Awards and also shortlisted as one of the finalists for the Institute for Scrap Recycling Industries (ISRI) 2016 Design for Recycling Award.

=== Partnership with The Breast Cancer Research Foundation ===
Sareen is also a supporter of the The Breast Cancer Research Foundation, based in New York since 2011. In 2012, he launched a pink side wall tire designed specifically to support the campaign. The pink side wall highlights the pink color of the fight again breast cancer. So far the company has donated over US$1.4 million, funding 28,000 hours of research to the cause.

== Rewa Vineyards ==
=== The estate ===
In 2012, Sareen acquired a vineyard in Coombsville AVA and named it after his wife, Rewa. The estate spans over 43 acres and is located in the providential rocky knoll in the volcanic hills of Coombsville which has a geologic history dating back 9 million years. The Vineyard produces a Sauvignon Blanc wine and two Cabernet Sauvignon wine.

== Awards and recognition ==
Throughout his career as the founding President and CEO of Omni United, Sareen has received many awards and recognitions. In 2018, he was felicitated by the Honourable Chief Minister of Madhya Pradesh, India, Mr. Chouhan Shivraj on behalf of the state Government for having done pioneering work in his professional field, his achievements and for his contribution to global economy. He is the recipient of the 2017, 2016 and 2015 Singapore Enterprise 50 awards, the 2015 Ethical Corporation's Sixth Annual Responsible Business Awards, the 2013 Distinguished Business Leader Award, and the 2013 DBS Insignia Spirit of Vision Prestige Award. In 2012, he was named to Fortune Magazine's 2012 list of "Asia's Hottest People in Business". In 2014, he was featured in "The Peak" magazine's anniversary publication as one of 30 men and women documenting their success stories - the "30/30 – The Game Changers".

== Personal life ==
In 1994, four years after their marriage, Sareen and his wife Rewa Manmohan Singh Sareen (born 4 Feb 1968) made the decision to relocate to Singapore. In 2009, Sareen took up citizenship in Singapore. The couple has two children, Hanut (born 22 Nov 1993) the elder son and Sumer (born 22 Oct 1998) the younger son. Sareen's mother lives with him in their Bukit Timah home, while his father died in 2005. Hanut served as a Sergeant in Singapore's National Service and currently manages key accounts and business development at Omni United. He is currently married to Alka and they have two sons. Sumer served as an Infantry Officer in Singapore's National Service and is currently managing Rewa Vineyards in the US.
