= Malaysian MC Kerambit =

Shree Chandran, better known by the stage name Malaysian MC Kerambit, is a Malaysian rapper and music producer. Also an audio engineer, Chandran has been living, recording and performing in the United States for just over a decade.

== Engineering, producing and rapping ==
Now based out of Los Angeles, Chandran has recorded, produced and engineered sessions for a slew of rappers and producers, both underground and mainstream, most notably, Micayle Mckinney (Danity Kane, Bow Wow), songwriter and producer Theron Feemster (Michael Jackson, Mary J. Blige, Ne-Yo), Klaus Derendorf (Carlos Santana, Josh Groban), German producer Fuego (Jason Derulo, Christina Milian), Production duo The Smeezingtons (B.o.B, Flo Rida) and mixer/audio engineer Lance Pierre (2pac, Eminem),

As a rapper, Chandran has released five solo albums, one group collaboration and two mixtapes. He has performed at shows in Los Angeles and his native Malaysia, and does much of his recording in Los Angeles and Cleveland, OH. He raps in both English and Bahasa Melayu. His topics vary from political upheaval and equality in Malaysia to grim street stories and his perspective of living in the U.S. His productions range from New York-influenced boom bap to techno, west coast funk and layered Malaysian movie samples.

== Biography ==
=== Early career ===
Chandran credits several high school friends with encouraging him to get back into writing and eventually recording. He had never written his own material with Da Joint and had never been a soloist. Chandran knew English, but still spoke and rapped with a significant accent, not always fully understanding American idioms and figures of speech. Still, his first, full written rap in America was the song, “Demonic,” which described his own internal plight and depression over his move to the States, along with his determination to come out on top. Its opening line deemed life a “nightmare.” The song's chorus features a higher power speaking directly to Chandran and encouraging him to emerge from his funk:

“Demonic, you treat your soul like some chronic/Just burnin’ it up, making things go into hectic/ I checked on your past, you hit button ‘automatic’/You have a beautiful soul, so don’t, please don’t waste it”

Chandran would continue writing and recording with local MCs and singers through his 2001 graduation. He had a very brief stint at the University of Akron, but soon decided that studying medicine was not his passion. The rapper says the September 11 attacks presented a turning point in which he realized life is too short to ignore dreams.

==== Dream and Golden Dream ====
He soon met Hip-hop producer Herbert “The Blinder” Townsend, a Binghamton, N.Y. transplant who lived on Cleveland's west side. Chandran spent much of fall 2001 recording with The Blinder. At The Blinder's in-home studio, Kerambit recorded Dream, a seven-song demo entirely produced by Townsend that included a new version of “Demonic.” He said that experience helped him hone his writing skills.

The Blinder's studio served as a gathering for several up-and-coming Cleveland MCs, including Trauma, who Kerambit eventually formed a bond and rap duo with, entitled MalayAmerica. The group's concept played on the cultural and geographical differences between the two members, yet sought to serve as an example of unity in a post-9/11 world.

The group released the Golden Dream album, produced by The Blinder, and equal parts solo Kerambit songs and solo Trauma records. Kerambit's solo contributions were taken from the Dream album. Among the album's joint collaborations was, “Disaster Has Struck,” which directly addressed 9/11, Osama bin Laden and the then-impending war in Afghanistan. The group and its debut gained traction as they sold it independently and attended music conferences and industry events. An internal feud led to the group's split before an impressed Calvin Gaines (Destiny's Child) could bring them to Arista Records, as he promised. The Blinder shut his studio down shortly after the split and returned to New York for family issues, and remains out of contact with Chandran.

== Artist development and music projects ==
=== Move to L.A. and Ya’ll Just Don’t Know 2003 ===
Chandran formed Malay-America Records Ltd. in April 2002 before relocating to L.A. Once there, he enrolled at Video Symphony, a Burbank, Calif. digital media institute where he earned Pro Tools certification. Producer Kevin Church and another Video Symphony student, re-recording mixer Steve Schatz, recorded much of Kerambit's music from 2003 to 2004. They hosted studio sessions where he laid vocals to beats he produced at Video Symphony. Some of these selections, along with tracks he completed in Cleveland before the L.A. move with producers Charles “Carlos” Wilder (Gerald Levert) & Veigaz “ShottaBoy” Mellano, would form the Ya’ll Just Don’t Know 2003 album. Church helped facilitate a working relationship with McKinney, who also began producing songs for Kerambit. He emerged from these sessions a more developed artist, the Malaysian MC. McKinney also gave him the nickname P.O.M. (Prince of Malaysia). Chandran also began producing and recording other musicians, including Cuban percussionist Long John Oliva. Kerambit was the last person to record Oliva and is featured on his song, “Moyumba.”

=== Malaysian MC, Reformasi and Chancellor Records ===
Kerambit released the Malaysian MC album in 2006. It represented his most daring work to that point, with more commercial offerings, including “Real Quick” and “Under the Influence” featuring his own brother, Krish Da Pimp. It also featured the Malaysian street anthem, “Where U At?” for which he shot a video in Burbank. The album was his first to be mastered by Mike Bozzi at Bernie Grundman Mastering in Hollywood and placed on iTunes and Amazon.com.

Prior to the release of Malaysian MC, began recording mixtapes, beginning with MA: Street in 2004. It featured his first freestyle recordings over famous instrumentals by Jay-Z, Nas and Lil Jon. The following summer, he recorded and released his second mixtape, MA2: The Malaysian Madman. Along with a diss to Malaysian rap group Too Phat, the mixtape also featured two new wrinkles: Kerambit rapping almost entirely in Bahasa Melayu and him openly endorsing and advocating for the Reformasi movement

Such lyrics are not a big deal in countries like the U.S. where freedom of speech is a natural right. In Kerambit's native country, though, the lyrics and content are stringently banned and contested by the country's Parliament. In his strongest showing of support, Kerambit prematurely claimed victory for Reformasi in the Malaysian General Election of 2008 three years before Anwar Ibrahim would win the Permatang Pauh by-election with a majority vote, returning him to Parliament as leader of the Malaysian opposition. The proclamation came in his “Reformasi Freestyle.” It is perhaps Kerambit's most spirited recording, and one in which he continually switches between a Bahasa Melayu flow and a more traditional, American hip-hop diction. In it, he exclaims, “Kerajaan Mati, Reformasi!” (Die Government, Reformation!). The song's Indian-flavored beat, given to Kerambit by a Cleveland DJ, later wound up on 50 Cent's “Get Down” track from DJ Whoo Kid’s G-Unit Radio 22: Hip-Hop is Dead mixtape. Kerambit believes performing “Reformasi” or many of his other MA2 recordings in Malaysia would result in his immediate arrest under the Internal Security Act without trial.

Kerambit signed a record, film and management deal with Chancellor Records in 2006 after proving himself to Kirv Entertainment head Kevin “KIRV” Irving (Dr. Dre, 50 Cent, Krayzie Bone) during a cold-call freestyle. Two months into the deal, however, Kerambit underwent two intestinal obstruction surgeries in five days, and spent weeks at the Swedish Medical Center in Englewood, Colo. The first procedure made the matter worse and landed him in the Intensive Care Unit. The second repair essentially saved his life. The surgeries put his career on hold and he got out of his deal at Chancellor.

=== Gengster Baik ===
In 2007, Kerambit returned to Malaysia for the first time since 1999. There, he initiated a Da Joint reunion, and produced the Dunia R.E.Z. album for Joint member REZ. Kerambit and REZ shopped the album to EMI and other labels, but they refused the violent and political content of the disc. DJ T-Bone, president of KartelHitmen soon hired Chandran as engineer to record popular Malaysian artists like Joe Flizzow, whom Chandran recorded & mixed on his collaboration with KRS-One, “Air Force Ones.”

Chandran later moved into a studio with “The GodFather” of Malaysian electronica, producer Syko-G, where the duo recorded MC Kerambit's fifth solo album, Gengster Baik. The 13-track album didn't abandon Kerambit's Reformasi ideals, but they were downplayed now that Chandran was back in Malaysia. Instead, the album was based around the concept of the “good gangsta” or “gangster baik,” who decried materialism, child molestation and other unlawfulness in the country. The album featured production from Syko-G, the American production team Hamster Alliance, Malaysian super producer Alvin “GoldFish” Teoh and featuring artists DJ Feedo of Egypt, and legendary Malaysian singer to’ki on the album's title track “Gengster Baik.”

=== Recent projects ===
Kerambit returned to the States in 2008 and earned permanent residency. He began recording and engineering sessions for producers like Feemster and pop acts like Prima J. He released his sixth album, Lost in America 1999-2009 in February 2010, as a celebration of his 10 years in the United States.
