= Genga, Liberia =

Vilalge in Lofa County, Liberia

Genga
- Location in Liberia
- Coordinates: 8°22′37″N 10°16′55″W
- Country: Liberia
- County: Lofa County
- District: Kolahun District

Genga is a village in northern Liberia. It is in the Kolahun District of Lofa County.

To the west is the border with Sierra Leone, whilst the border with Guinea is to the north. Mount Wuteve is 40 km to the SE.

Genga lies in a valley at an altitude of 432 meters, Lat 8°22'37"N, Long 10°16'55"W.

An alternate name is Geinga.
