= Omni United =

Singaporean tyre manufacturer

Omni United Pte Ltd
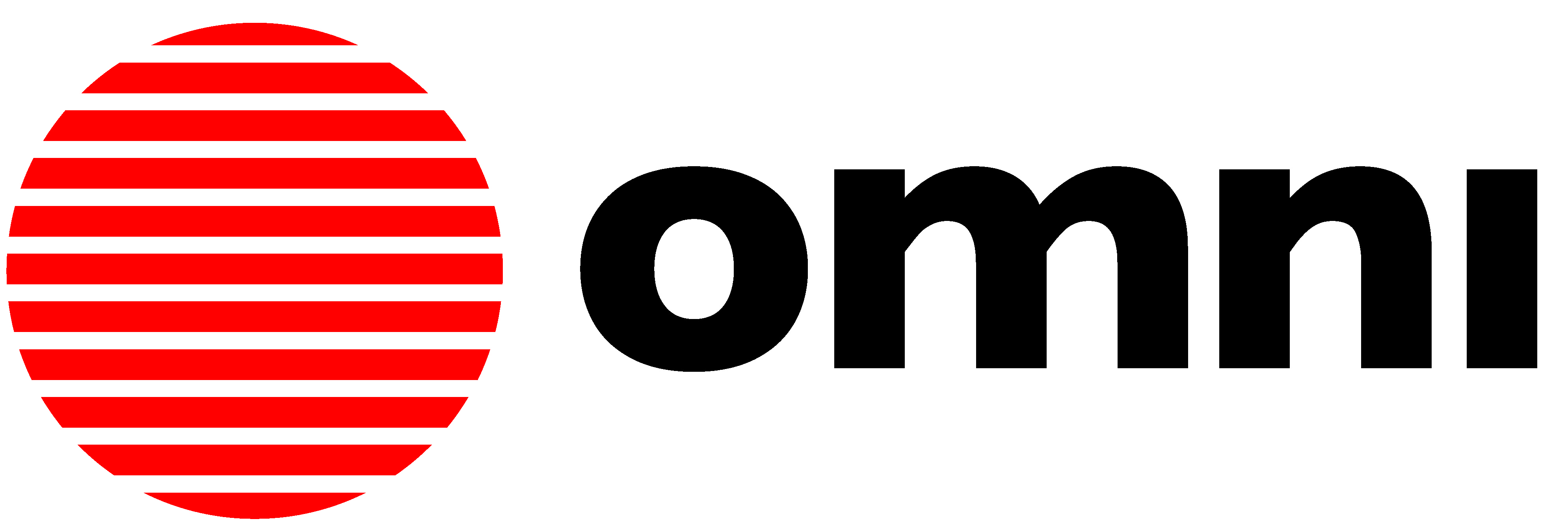
- Industry: Manufacturing, distribution
- Founded: 2003; 23 years ago
- Founder: G.S. Sareen
- Headquarters: Singapore
- Products: Tyres
- Brands: Radar Tyres, Patriot Tires, American Tourer, Tecnica Tires, RoadLux, Timberland Tires
- Owner: G.S. Sareen
- Website: www.omni-united.com

Omni United Pte Ltd is a tyre designer, manufacturer, and distributor headquartered in Singapore. The company develops and produces tyres in collaboration with manufacturing partners in Thailand, Serbia, China, and India. It owns several brands including Radar, Patriot, American Tourer, and Tecnica, and also develops other licensed and private brands. The company was founded in 2003 by G.S. Sareen, a former entrepreneur in the e-commerce industry. Omni United offers tyres for passenger cars, SUVs, 4x4, light truck, van, trailer, truck, and bus. It distributes more than five million tyres annually across 80 countries worldwide.

Omni United acquired Interstate Tire Distributor, a California-based wholesaler with six locations in four Western states, in October 2015. In June 2016, the company finalized the acquisition of Texas-based A to Z Tire & Battery, Inc. The business has since been renamed Radar Tires, Inc., formerly Omnisource.

== Brands ==
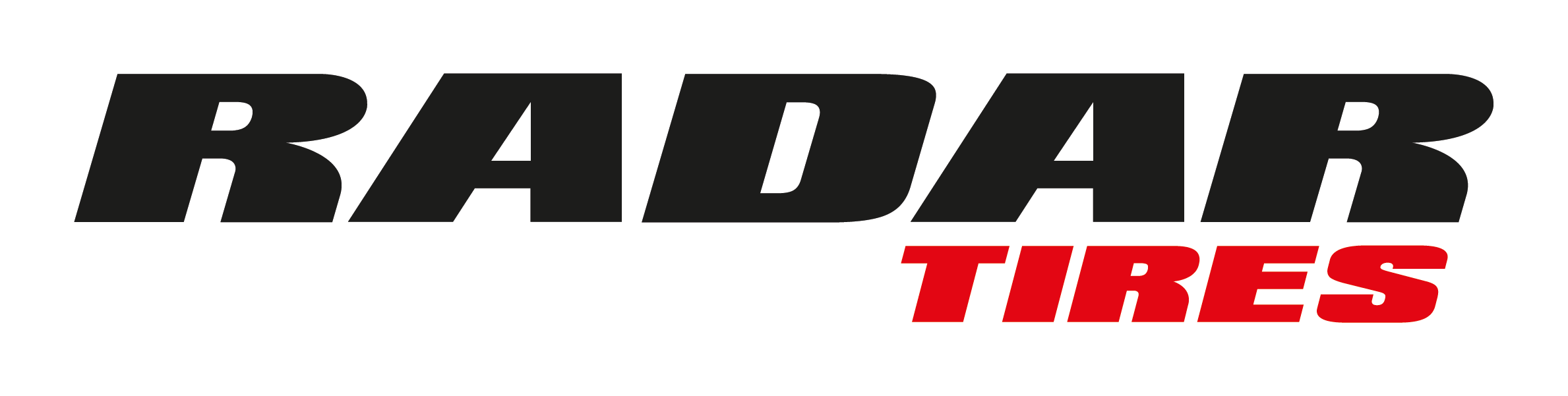
Radar Tyres is the flagship brand of Singapore-headquartered Omni United.

Omni United owns several brand names under which it offers products for passenger cars, SUVs, 4x4s, light trucks, vans, trailers, and commercial vehicles.

- Radar Tyres
- Patriot Tires
- American Tourer
- Tecnica
- Roadlux
- Timberland Tires

=== Radar Tyres ===
The Radar Tyres brand is owned by Omni United and was launched in 2006. The brand offers tyres for passenger cars, SUVs, 4x4s, light trucks, vans, trailers, trucks and buses.

=== Patriot Tires ===
The Patriot brand is owned by Omni United and was launched in 2016. The brand offers tyres for SUVs and light trucks.

=== American Tourer ===
The American Tourer brand is owned by Omni United and was launched in 2017. The brand offers tyres for passenger cars and CUVs. This brand is primarily sold in the United States by American automotive retail chains, Pep Boys.

=== Tecnica ===
The Tecnica brand is owned by Omni United and was launched in 2019. The brand offers tyres for passenger cars and SUVs.

=== Timberland Tires ===
Timberland Tires is a collaboration between Timberland and Omni United. The tyres feature a rubber formulation that is appropriate for the recycling of the tyres at the end of their useful life into outsoles for Timberland shoes. This collaboration is currently inactive.

== Radar Tires, Inc. ==
Radar Tires, Inc., formerly Omnisource, was founded in 1926 as Amarillo Bus Company. Radar Tires, Inc. has multiple distribution centers and a distribution network across the United States.

== Support to Breast Cancer Research Foundation (BCRF) ==
In 2011, Omni United through its Radar Tyres brand, partnered with the Breast Cancer Research Foundation (BCRF), to raise awareness about this cause and fund breast cancer research. To date, Omni has donated over US $1.4 million, which has funded approximately 28,000 hours of breast cancer research.

== Omni United collaboration with GFG Style (Giorgetto & Fabrizio Giugiaro) ==
In December 2021, Omni United entered into a collaboration with Italian automotive design house GFG Style, founded by Giorgetto and Fabrizio Giugiaro, to enhance the brand appeal of the Radar Tyres brand. Under this collaboration a number of passenger car and light truck tyre ranges have been launched.

=== Michael Clarke - Australian Cricket Legend as Global Brand Ambassador ===
Radar Tyres appointed former Australian cricketer Michael Clarke as a Global Brand Ambassador. Clarke, who captained Australia and led the team to victory in the 2015 ICC Cricket World Cup, represents Radar Tyres across selected markets through promotional campaigns and brand initiatives.

== Sports marketing programs ==
In 2013, Radar Tyres entered into the off-road racing world in the Lucas Oil Off Road Racing Series, SCORE International Desert Series and TORC: The Off Road Championship. In these series, the company participates in short-course off-road desert racing and long course desert racing. Radar's inaugural season featured the brand's Renegade R5 M/T tyre. Radar Tyres won the Class 10 at the SCORE International Baja 500.

In 2016, the company announced sponsorship of LPGA player Jodi Ewart Shadoff. The sponsorship concluded in 2021.

Radar Tyres has made marketing agreements with various sports leagues. In 2024, they entered into a multi-year sponsorship agreement with the Singapore Golf Association (SGA). In 2025, Radar Tyres signed a multi-year partnership agreement with Cricket South Africa (CSA). In October 2026, they signed a multi-year sponsorship agreement with the Maharlika Pilipinas Basketball League (MPBL)
