= Kolahun District =

District in Liberia

Coordinates: 8°17′13″N 10°05′04″W

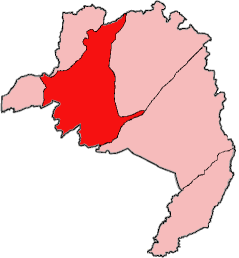
Location of Kolahun District in Lofa County

Kolahun District is an administrative district of Lofa County in Liberia. In 2008, it had an estimated population of 60,557. Kolahun was the scene of heavy fighting between government troops and rebels during Liberia's second civil war, causing massive shifts in population and destruction of property.

In 2015, Kolahun District was split into three separate districts, with Lukambeh District and Wanhasa District splitting off from Kolahun.

== See also ==
- Boawolohun
- Genga, Liberia
