= Ninian Mogan Lourdenadin =

British-Malaysian businessan

- Occupations: Businessman, investor

Dr. Ninian Mogan Lourdenadin KCMG KBE is a British-Malaysian businessman, investor, and doctor. He is the principal shareholder and CEO of MBf Holdings, a Malaysian services conglomerate operating in Malaysia, Fiji, Papua New Guinea, Singapore, Thailand, United Kingdom, United States of America, Tonga, Vanuatu, Solomon Islands, Guinea, Liberia, Togo and Australia.

According to Forbes, he is the 25th richest person in Malaysia, with a net worth of $1 billion.

Between 2004 and 2014 he donated $15 million to education and children's health charities as well as to Hindu temples in Malaysia, Fiji and Papua New Guinea. In 2014 he was featured in Forbes Asia's list of 48 Heroes of Philanthropy.

== Honour ==
=== Honour of Malaysia ===
- Malaysia
  - Commander of the Order of Loyalty to the Crown of Malaysia (P.S.M.) (2007)
