= January Low =

January Low Wye San
- Occupation: Dancer

January Low Wye San is a Malaysian Indian Classical dancer of Chinese Indian descent. She specializes in the classical dance forms of Orissi and Bharathanatyam.

Dancing under the tutelage of guru Ramli Ibrahim since she was 8, she developed into a promising artist and was soon labeled his protégé.

She had her arangetram (solo graduation dance) when she was 18 and went to receive the 2003 Kakiseni Award for Best Solo Performer for her performance.

Since then she has toured around the world with the Sutra Dance Theatre, performing in Sydney, New York, Ukraine, Paris, India, Italy and Malaysia.

She also appeared in Malaysian musician Pete Teo’s national unity music video "Here in My Home last" in 2008, starring alongside 49 other personalities, including football pundit Shebby Singh, Air Asia chief executive officer Datuk Seri Tony Fernandes, model Amber Chia, comedian Harith Iskander and actors Maya Karin.

She has appeared in various magazines, most recently on the cover of Tatler Malaysia's May 2009 arts issue.

In May 2009, she resigned from Sutra Dance Theatre and was to be in Seoul until November as part of a residency program in conjunction with the Seoul International Dance Festival to be held in South Korea later in the year.

== Sources ==
- "Low goes solo". New Straits Times. 19 May 2009. Archived from the original on 25 May 2009.
- "The Apotheosis by January Low, Under the Stars 2005". Kakiseni. August 2008. Archived from the original on 3 August 2008.
- "Download". Malaysian Artistes for Unity. Archived from the original on 23 March 2019.
- "da:ns festival 2008: Seen: Silent by Hun Pen & January Low (Cambodia/Malaysia)". Timeout Singapore. 17 October 2008. Archived from the original on 19 October 2008.
