= Doraisingam Pillai =

Malaysian business executive

Tan Sri Doraisingam Pillai is the CEO of the Lotus chain of restaurants and companies, which include music shops and cineplexes. He was awarded the Malaysian Indian Entrepreneur of 2005 by Malaysian Associated Indian Chambers of Commerce & Industry's (MAICCI).
