= International Service for the Acquisition of Agri-biotech Applications =

International Service for the Acquisition of Agri-biotech Applications (ISAAA)
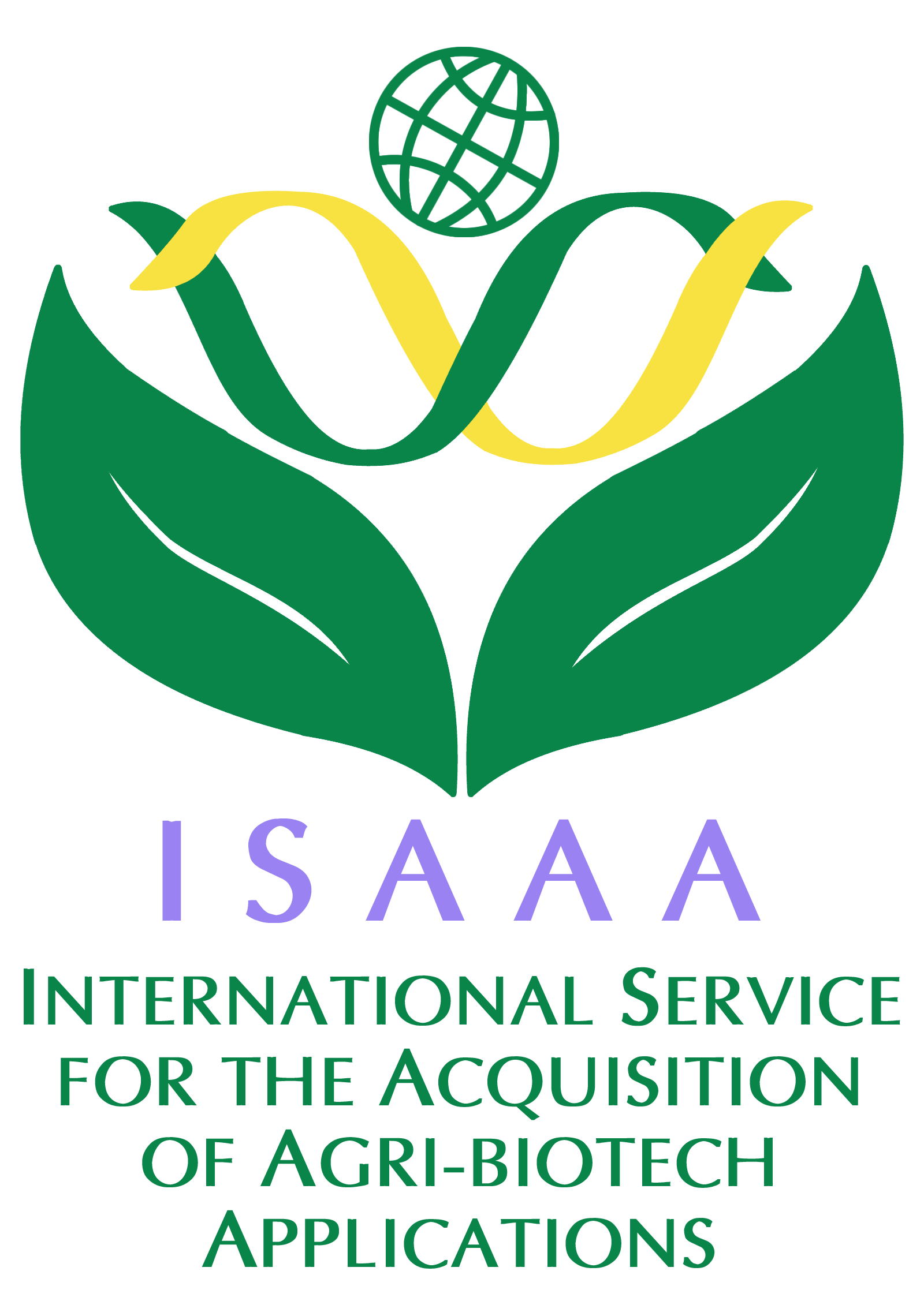
- Abbreviation: ISAAA
- Formation: 1992; 34 years ago
- Type: Not for profit organization
- Purpose: Technology transfer, Knowledge Sharing, Capacity Building, Impact Assessment of GM Crops
- Location: United States, Kenya, Philippines
- Region served: Worldwide
- Main organ: Board of Directors
- Website: www.isaaa.org

The International Service for the Acquisition of Agri-biotech Applications (ISAAA) is a non-profit international organization that shares agricultural biotechnology, focusing on genetic engineering.

== Structure ==
ISAAA operates three regional centers; ISAAA SEAsiaCenter, ISAAA AfriCenter and ISAAA AmeriCenter. ISAAA SEAsiaCenter is hosted by the International Rice Research Institute (IRRI) in Los Baños, Laguna, Philippines. This center also serves as the Global Coordination Office as well as the home of the Global Knowledge Center on Crop Biotechnology. ISAAA AfriCenter is hosted by the International Livestock Research Institute (ILRI) located in Nairobi, Kenya. ISAAA AmeriCenter is located in Cornell University, Ithaca, New York. It serves as the administrative and financial headquarters of the organization.

== Donor organisations ==
The ISAAA receives funding from both public and private donors. Some of the ISAAA's funding agencies and companies include the USDA, US Grains Council, Monsanto, Bayer, two banks – Fondazione Bussolera in Italy and Ibercaja in Spain, USAID and the Agricultural Biotechnology Support Project II.

== Annual Report on the Global Status of Commercialized Biotech/GM Crops ==
The organization releases an annual publication on the global status of commercially approved genetically engineered crops. The publication is authored by Clive James, the founder and chair emeritus of ISAAA. The annual brief provides research on global trends in the adoption of major biotech crops since they were first planted commercially. Various environmental groups have accused the ISAAA of inflating the size and impact of genetically modified crops in their report. James says that the report is based on a multiple public and private sources and that he considers it conservative.

The 2015 report says that "18 million farmers planted 179.7 million hectares of biotech crops in 28 countries, a marginal decrease of 1% (1.8 million hectares) from 2014." As per International Service for the Acquisition of Agri-Biotech Applications (ISAAA)'s latest 'Global Status of Commercialized Biotech/ GM Crops in 2017' report, India has the world's fifth largest cultivated area under genetically modified (GM) crops. The country with the highest area under transgenic crops, at 75 mh, is the United States.

== GM approval database ==
ISAAA documents approved GM crops worldwide and presents them in a database available in the organization's website. Each biotech event is featured with a brief description about the crop, trait, transformation method, developer, and summary of regulatory approval. Entries in the database were sourced from Biotechnology Clearing Houses/Regulatory Institutions of approving countries.

== See also ==
- Margaret Karembu - ISAAA AfriCenter Director
