= Dhilip Varman =

Malaysian singer, lyricist and composer

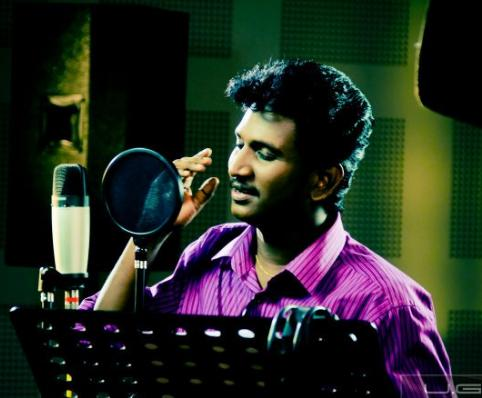

Background information
- Born: S. Dhilip varman
- Genres: Film score, theatre, world music
- Occupations: Composer, record producer, music director, singer, instrumentalist, arranger, programmer
- Years active: 2000–present
- Website: http://www.dhilipvarman.blogspot.com (defunct)

S. Dhilip Varman is a Malaysian singer, lyricist and composer.

== Background ==
Born and brought up from the state of Penang, many compare the texture and melody of his vocal range with that of Indian playback singers. Dhilip is an ardent fan of renowned musical composers Ilayaraja and A.R. Rahman, started his musical journey as a stage singer, performing at small shows. His productions have since appeared in local films 24 November, Kanngal and Ivanthan Hero. He even collected the Best Male Vocalist at last year’s MIMI (Malaysian Indian Music Industry) Awards. Dhilip produced his first local album, Kanavellam, which featured songs composed and arranged by him. Former Malaysian Works Minister Samy Vellu also contributed a poem that was used as a lyrics for the song, Kanavugal Varum (Dreams Will Come).

In the year 2000, Dhilip started his musical journey as a stage singer, performing in shows and concerts initially. His talent did not go unnoticed and in 2002 he got an opportunity to sing in an Album Rogkwave "Naveenam". He was given the chance to sing in an album by Sashi Rogkwave a.k.a. D’ Shaaq and later he invited him to join the group. Soon he ventured into his own production with the guidance of Rogkwave and went on to form his very own company Dhilip Varman Productions. Dhilip Varman shot to fame with his song Uyirai Tholaiten composed by Jay of Stigmatrix. This song caught the nation by surprise with its composition and rendering quality became the number 1 hit song featured for the longest period in THR Raaga Malaysian Top 10. Dhilip has moved a step forward with this success by recently launching his own album, Kanavellam. Dhilip's next album ( Meendum Meendum ) coming soon, in this new coming album, he has even sang a song with an Indian playback singer Karthik (singer) which was recorded in India itself.

Dhilip was also selected as "Best Male Vocalist" for MIMI Awards 2007.

== Filmography ==
=== Movie ===
| Year | Tamil | Notes |
|---|---|---|
| 2015 | Uyirai Tholaithen | Debut Tamil Movie (India) |
| 2018 | Kadaare Ragasiam | Malaysia Tamil Movie |

=== Album ===
| Year | Tamil | Notes |
|---|---|---|
| 2000 | Meendum Meendum | Album |
| 2007 | Kanavellam | Debut Malaysian Album |
| 2009 | Uyirai Tholaithean | Malaysian Album |
| 2015 | Sollamale Kan Mun Thonrinai | Debut Movie |
| 2018 | Kannerily | Vanothan Music Video |
| 2020 | Manasellam | Vanothan lyric Video / Music Video |

== As playback singer ==
=== Tamil songs ===
| Year | Film | Song | Music director | Co-singer(s) |
|---|---|---|---|---|
| 2013 | Ennathan Pesuvatho | "Nenje nenje" | D. Imman | Harshdeep Kaur |

== Awards ==
| Year | Category | Song | Film | Notes |
|---|---|---|---|---|
| 2007 | MIMI Award | Kanavellam | Kanavellam | Best Male Vocalist |
