= Goldkartz =

- Origin: Malaysia
- Genres: Bhangra, Punjabi dance music
- Years active: 2008–present
- Members: Manjit Singh Gill; Sukhjit Singh Gill

Goldkartz (sometimes stylised GoldKartz) is a Malaysian Indian music duo consisting of two Sikh brothers - Manjit Singh Gill and Sukhjit Singh Gill. They make Punjabi-inspired dance music. They have been called "the first serious attempt by a Southeast Asian bhangra recording act to cross over to foreign markets".

== History ==
Goldkartz's first album, Loaded, was released in 2008 and had some success in Malaysia. In 2010, they began working on their second album 24 Karaatz. Rosmah Mansor, the wife of Malaysian Prime Minister Najib Razak, helped in its release. 24 Karaatz was released in 2011 in Malaysia and in the USA, the UK, Europe, Canada and India.

== Reception ==
They have received critical acclaim for their music. Goldkartz's first album Loaded was the first bhangra album to be recorded and made completely in Malaysia and received that distinction in the Malaysian Book of Records.

== Discography ==
- Loaded (2008)
- 24 Karaatz (2011)

No.	Title	Length
1.	"Ha Karde" (featuring Rishi Rich and Mumzy Stranger)	4:17
2.	"Paisa" (featuring Vibe)	4:27
3.	"Gidhe Vich Nach" (featuring PBN)	4:20
4.	"Khed Ishqe Da"	5:14
5.	"Marjava"	5:11
6.	"Put Sardara De" (featuring Johnny Kalsi)	4:53
7.	"Sher Punjabi (Rebirth Mix)"	3:39
8.	"Nachangi Meh" (featuring Ranjit Gill and, Deftman)	4:18
9.	"Jawani"	4:38
10.	"Rock With You"	4:13
11.	"Dhol Tu Wadja"	5:00
12.	"Put Sardara De" (featuring Tigerstyle)	4:45
13.	"Tu Nachdi" (featuring Vibe)	3:39
14.	"Naal Nachna" (featuring Vibe)	4:16
15.	"Veer Da Viyah"	5:09
16.	"Rock With You (Tamil)" (featuring Shankar Mahadevan)	4:13
17.	"Bebaskan Hatim" (featuring Awie (Wings))	5:03
