= Beat the System (band) =

Malaysian/American rock band

- Origin: Kuala Lumpur, Malaysia
- Members: Stewart Sellan; Gerald Sellan; Shannon Gibbons; Adrian Puan

Beat the System is a Malaysian/American pop band from Kuala Lumpur, Malaysia. Formed in Malaysia by lead guitarist Stewart Sellan, the band is currently based in New York City. The band consists of lead vocalist Shannon Gibbons, lead guitarist Stewart Sellan, drummer/composer Gerald Sellan and composer Adrian Puan. Since the band's formation, there have been several line-up changes.

The band's debut single, "Gone", was on TraXX FM charts for 10 weeks in a row and 4 weeks at number 1. Beat the System has released multiple singles, including 2009's "Penipuan Berwaris", which was also selected as the single of Warner Music Malaysia compilation album "Indiestructable:Spirit of Freedom", 2010's "Transisi" a track that was written and produced by Beat the System for Warner Music Malaysia/EMI artist Fiq for his second album 'Diagnostik', and 2012's "Shine" featuring Malaysian Idol winner Jaclyn Victor.

In response to their single "Shine", Beat the System won the Song of the Year Award, Best Collaboration Award and Best Genre Bender Award at the 2012 Asian Voice Independent Music Awards featuring bands all over Asia.

In 2010, Beat the System was certified with Tipped to Be the Next Big Thing by the Asian Voice Independent Awards committee.

Diana Meltzer discovered and arranged their move to the US.

== History ==
In 2005, lead guitarist Stewart Sellan met Rage at a church in Johor Bahru and started writing songs. The duo realized that they needed a bassist to perform and Sam Seelan was introduced to the band by Rage. It was when Stewart Sellan decided to move to Kuala Lumpur, that he realized his brother Gerald Sellan was a drummer and offered him to join the band. Gerald Sellan was appointed as the band leader after a couple of years and the band was directed towards a newer sound.

After the departure of Rage, Gerald Sellan and Adrian Puan were appointed to be songwriters for the band.

After composing 10 brand new tracks, the band recorded a 30-minute EP and begins to shop for label in the US in which it caught the attention of Diana Meltzer of Monster Hits Music.

Diana Meltzer, upon hearing the Beat the System EP, flew to Malaysia and started developing the band. In December 2014 the band was relocated to New York to work on their debut album, Journey, with producer Andy Anderson, Grammy Awards nominated engineer Damien Page Lewis and mastering engineer Chris Athens. The band also acquired a new lead singer, May Leigh. After her departure in 2019, she was later replaced by Shannon Gibbons, a former American Idol contestant.

== Band members ==
Current members

- Gerald Sellan – songwriter, drums (2008–present)
- Stewart Sellan – electric guitar, acoustic guitar (2005–present)
- Shannon Gibbons – lead vocalist (2020–present)
- Adrian Puan – songwriter (2011–present)

Former members

- May Leigh – lead vocalist (2015–2019)

Touring musicians

- Mario Leong – keyboards, electric guitar, acoustic guitar (2011–present)

== Discography ==
=== Extended plays ===
Title	Album details
Beat the System EP	Released: 2007; Label: Self-released

=== Singles ===
Title	Year	Album	Details
"Be Your Own"	2016	Journey	Released: April 1, 2016; Label: Seismic Records
"Hero"	2016	Journey	Released: May 27, 2016; Label: Seismic Records
"Be Your Own" (featuring Riddler)	2017	Journey	Released: October 5, 2017; Label: Seismic Records
"Never Be the Same (Again)"	2018	Journey	Released: May 31, 2018; Label: Seismic Records
"Here Comes the Time"	2018	Journey	Released: December 5, 2018; Label: Seismic Records
"Chasing the High"	2021		Released: April 2, 2021; Label: AWAL Music

=== Compilation appearances ===
Album	Song	Year	Album details
Panic in the Peninsula	"Bring It On"	2005	Disarseter Records
Holocaust	"Heighten Horizon"	2006	Sam Seelan and Rage was featured in this song together with Saer'ze and K-Town Clan
Possibly the Best Compilation Ever!	"Penipuan Berwaris"	2008	Limited Edition
VOIZE : Possibly the Best Compilation Ever!	"Penipuan Berwaris"	2008	Voize.my
Indiestructable - Spirit of Freedom	"Penipuan Berwaris"	2009	Warner Music Malaysia
Diagnostik	"Transisi" (featuring Fiq)	2010	
A World Without Borders	"Gone"	2010	VR1 Playtime Productions
A World Without Borders	"Insanity"	2010	VR1 Playtime Productions
The Best of VIMA	"Shine" (featuring Jaclyn Victor)	2013	Sony Music Malaysia

== Awards and nominations ==
Asian Voice Independent Music Awards

Year	Nominated work	Award	Result
2010	Beat the System	Tipped to be the Next Big Thing	Won
2010	"Penipuan Berwaris"	Best Rock Song	Nominated
2012	"Shine"	Song of the Year	Won
2012	"Shine"	Best Collaboration	Won
2012	"Shine"	Best Genre Bender	Won

Asian Bite My Music Global Awards

Year	Nominated work	Award	Result
2012	"Shine"	Song of the Year	Won
2012	"Shine"	Best Collaboration	Won
2012	"Shine"	Best Vocalist	Nominated
2013	"Hero"	Best Rock Song	Won
