= Gengadharan Nair =

Justice Datuk K. P. Gengadharan Nair is a Malaysian High Court judge and prior to that was a prominent lawyer specialising in industrial law.

== Early life ==
Genga, as he was known to all, was born on 30 April 1944 in Kuala Lumpur. He was one of three children born to C.R. Nair and Lakshmi Kutty Amma.

As many from his generation who became lawyers, Genga was first a school teacher, trained at Brinsford Lodge in Liverpool and on his return, served in a number of schools, including the prestigious Victoria Institution in Kuala Lumpur.

He quickly became active in union activities.

== Legal and Judicial Career ==
In 1968, he quit teaching and left for London to read law at the Inner Temple. He was called to the bar after securing a Second Class degree in his first attempt at the Bar examinations.

On his return to Malaysia in 1972, Genga did his pupilage at the law firm of Xavier and Vadiveloo, a firm specialising in industrial law. He was admitted as an Advocate and Solicitor of the High Court of Malaya in June 1973. With the late D.P. Xavier as his mentor, Genga established himself as an expert in industrial law.

In all his years in practice, Genga only represented trade unions and the employees, eschewing the more lucrative briefs of employers and employer associations. He was committed to the advancement of labour rights

As a member of the Malaysian Bar, he was for many years a member of the Industrial Court of Rules and Practice Committee of the Bar Council and sat on the Bar Council's Special Committee on Review of Chambering in 2002.

In 1988, Genga and his partners, N. Mahalingam and Wong Lu Peen established the firm of Genga Maha Wong & Co (later known as Genga Maha & Peri) with the address Room 302, 3rd Floor, Bangunan NUBE, 114 Jalan Tuanku Abdul Rahman, 50100 Kuala Lumpur.

When Genga was appointed Judicial Commissioner in 2003, many, especially lawyers, who have appeared before him felt that the elevation should have been made much earlier.

He showed that appeared before him that, when properly attended, litigation as developed in the common law courts was one of the finest arts for conflict resolution available to man.

In the High Court in Johor Bahru, where he first heard his cases, he earned the respect of lawyers. The Court of Appeal had no difficulties in affirming his decisions.

He is also widely quoted for his judgements relating to criminal matters. In, PP V. Mohd. Abbas Danus Baksan [2004] 7 CLJ 249, he stated as follows:

"It is, in my humble view, quite clear that the accused was merely trying to tailor his defence in an attempt to create doubts about the prosecution's case knowing full well, having opted to give his evidence in the form of an unsworn statement from the dock that his story cannot be tested by cross examination. The end result of his statement is just a mere denial and assertions not supported by evidence. It is trite that mere denial without other proof to reasonably dislodge the evidence presented by the prosecution is insufficient to inject reasonable doubt into the prosecution's case."

In PP v Jessica Lim Lu Ping & Anor [2004] 2 CLJ 763, he observed that

Despite decades of sentencing by the Malaysian courts no golden rule has yet evolved in the sentencing of accused persons following a conviction in criminal cases. Neither have the courts evolved a cast iron formula to be followed in sentencing. However, there has always been a general flexible principle that all courts have a flexible and free discretion to be exercised judicially and with a judicial conscience in deciding the period in which a guilty criminal will be incarcerated in prison. Nonetheless, our courts have evolved a general flexible rule propounded through numerous decided cases that where an accused person pleads guilty without contesting the charge or charges against him in a trial which might consume many days, involving prosecutors, witnesses, documents, police officers and chemists the courts lean in favour of imposing a reduced sentence. A "plea of guilty" achieves the disposal of a criminal case with lightning speed. Every contest and trial leads to a backlog of undisposed criminal cases clogging the courts and the prisons with remand prisoners. It is in the public interest that pending criminal cases be disposed off as expeditiously as possible and accused persons who plead guilty be imposed with a reduced sentence. Honesty is a universal obligation and a reduced sentence encourages honesty when an accused pleads guilty, the end result being that more accused persons would willingly admit guilt without a trial, thus, reducing the workload of the prosecutor's office and the clearance of the backlog of cases.

== Family and Social Service ==
In 1976, he married Devagey Raru. A son, Sashikharan was born in 1982. Despite a busy schedule, Genga always made time for the family.

He spent his limited time engaging in community service. For many year, until his appointment as a judge, he was an active and respected member of the Rotary Club of Damansara.

Genga died on 21 April 2007 at the Subang Jaya Medical Centre in Petaling Jaya following a short illness and was cremated the day after.
