= Shan Ratnam =

- Born: Sittampalam Shanmugaratnam; 4 July 1928
- Died: 6 August 2001 (aged 73); Pasir Panjang, Queenstown, Singapore

Emeritus Professor Sittampalam Shanmugaratnam (4 July 1928 – 6 August 2001), also known as Shan Ratnam, was a Singaporean obstetrician and gynaecologist.

He was professor and head of the department of Obstetrics and Gynaecology of the National University Hospital of Singapore and specialized in human reproduction research. He was a medical pioneer and leader in the field of Obstetrics and Gynaecology, both in Singapore and internationally. At the peak of his career, he was the secretary-general of the Asia and Oceania Federation of Obstetrics and Gynaecology (AOFOG) and the president of the International Federation of Obstetrics and Gynaecology.

His work placed Singapore at the forefront in the international medical arena and established himself as a prominent figure in world of Obstetrics and Gynaecology. His work on contraception also contributed to Singapore's success in population control. The National University Hospital research laboratory for prostaglandin research was initiated and propelled by his vision and energy. He was also the founder of the IVF programme for childless couples.

== Career ==
As a young man, Ratnam began his career as a houseman (trainee medical officer) at the Singapore General Hospital in 1959. He also began teaching at the University of Singapore in 1963.

After obtaining his M.R.C.O.G (and later, the F.R.C.S.) in 1964 in England, he was appointed to the post of Professor and Head of the Department of Obstetrics and Gynaecology in Singapore, a post which he held for 25 years.

In 1972, Ratnam's Obstetrics and Gynaecology department received the accolade as being one of "13 research centres in human reproduction in the world", recognition conferred by the World Health Organization.

In 1970 he was made Chief Examiner and Director (1972) of Postgraduate Medical Studies at the National University of Singapore. He was a member of the editorial boards of several learned journals, including the International Journal of Obstetrics & Gynaecology, and International Journal of Prenatal and Perinatal Studies.

Ratnam's book, Cries from Within, was written to explain the procedure for sex change operations in 1970. He also led conception of the first in-vitro fertilization process in Asia, in 1983. He tried out IVF experiments on rats prior to his first, successful attempt on using IVF to conceive babies.

In 1977, he was awarded the Singapore Gold Public Administration Medal. His learned articles and conference papers run into the hundreds, and he has edited or co-edited 15 books to his credit.

Ratnam served as the secretary general of the Asia and Oceania Federation of Obstetrics and Gynaecology for seventeen years, and was a member of the executive board of the International Federation of Obstetrics and Gynaecology from 1969 to 1982, president-elect from 1982 to 1985, and president from 1985 to 1988.

Ratnam was awarded the Sims Black Travelling Professorship and the Visiting Professorship of the South African representative committee, both by the Royal College of Obstetricians and Gynaecologists, in 1982 and 1994 respectively.

In 1987, he also pioneered the procedure of giving birth to a baby born from frozen embryo transfer. He was part of a team of clinicians and scientists which led to the world's first microinjection baby via human ampullary coculture in 1991.

Ratnam also contributed to gynaecology through research. He had credit to 378 research papers in the referred International Journals, 232 research papers in the referred local and regional journals, including nineteen non-referred journals.

His career as a research scientist and teacher continued at the National University of Singapore despite his official retirement in 1998, as Emeritus Professor of Gynaecology and Obstetrics. He was a world authority on sex change operations, developing new techniques for transsexualism, embryo replacement, in vitro and controlled fertilisation.

His work with transsexual patients was shown in a documentary called "Shocking Asia". In this documentary, he was shown talking about his background with transsexual patients. He talked about how he first got involved with "the problem" (referring to the patient's penis) and how he used cadavers to come up with his technique of sexual reassignment surgery. It also shows his assistant, Dr Lim, taking some final pictures of a patient before her surgery.

== Personal life ==
Ratnam suffered a stroke in December 1999. He developed heart complications and died from pneumonia at 6:55 p.m. on 6 August 2001 in the National University Hospital of Singapore at the age of 73.

== Legacy ==
Many of his former students are now members in the O&G field including the current head of department at the National University Hospital, Dr P. C. Wong. He was a Hindu during his lifetime. He had two children; one son and one daughter. A centre at Camden Medical Centre was named after him, SSR International (Private International). The centre is currently run by his nephew C. Anandakumar.
