= Miss World 1988 =

Beauty pageant edition

- Miss World 1988 Titlecard
- Date: 17 November 1988
- Presenters: Peter Marshall; Alexandra Bastedo
- Entertainment: Koreana; Donny Osmond
- Venue: Royal Albert Hall, London, United Kingdom
- Broadcaster: Thames Television
- Entrants: 84
- Placements: 10
- Debuts: Bulgaria
- Withdrawals: Brazil; Panama; Saint Vincent and the Grenadines
- Returns: British Virgin Islands; Egypt; Ghana; Guyana; Liberia; Sierra Leone; Taiwan; Uganda
- Winner: Linda Pétursdóttir; Iceland

Miss World 1988, the 38th edition of the Miss World pageant, was held on 17 November 1988 at the Royal Albert Hall in London, United Kingdom.

The winner was Linda Pétursdóttir (Queen of Europe) from Iceland. At the conclusion of the event, she was crowned by Miss World 1987, Ulla Weigerstorfer of Austria. Runner-up was Yeon-hee Choi (Queen of Asia) representing South Korea and third was Kirsty Roper from the United Kingdom. The Miss World 1988 was hosted by Peter Marshall, who has hosted other Miss World competitions such as Miss World 1986, and Alexandra Bastedo, with musical performances by Koreana and 1970s American pop musician Donny Osmond.

This edition marked the debut of Bulgaria and the return of Egypt, which had last competed in 1956, Taiwan last competed (as Free China) in 1964, Ghana last competed in 1968 , Guyana last competed in 1971, Liberia and Uganda last competed in 1985, and the British Virgin and Sierra Leone Islands last competed in 1986

Brazil, Panama, and Saint Vincent and the Grenadines withdrew from the competition due to lost Miss World franchise.

== Results ==
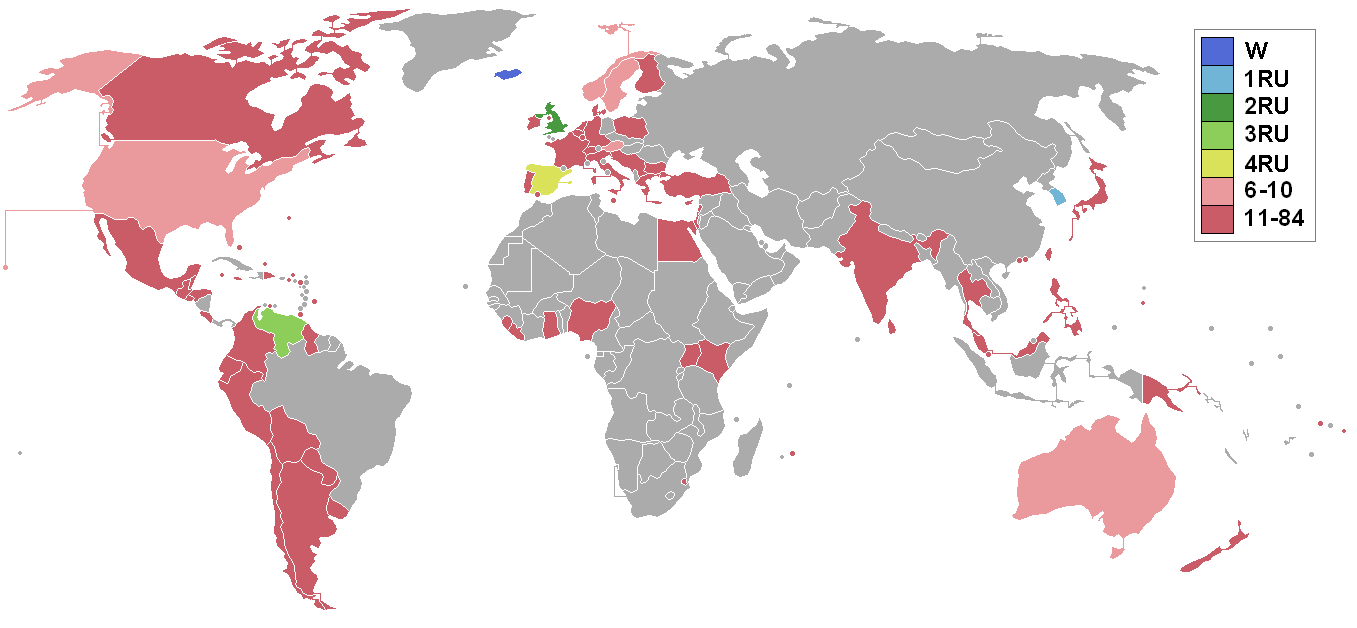
Countries and territories which sent delegates and results for Miss World 1988

=== Placements ===
Placement	Contestant
Miss World 1988	Iceland – Linda Pétursdóttir
1st Runner-Up	South Korea – Yeon-hee Choi
2nd Runner-Up	United Kingdom – Kirsty Roper
Top 5	Spain – Susana de la Llave Varón; Venezuela – Emma Rabbe
Top 10	Australia – Catherine Bushell; Austria – Alexandra Werbanschitz; Norway – Rita Helene Paulsen; Sweden – Cecilia Hörberg; United States – Diana Magaňa

==== Continental Queens of Beauty ====
Continental Group	Contestant
Africa	Kenya – Dianna Naylor
Americas	Venezuela – Emma Irmgard Marina Rabbe Ramírez
Asia	South Korea – Yeon-hee Choi
Europe	Iceland – Linda Pétursdóttir
Oceania	Australia – Catherine Bushell

== Contestants ==
84 countries participated in Miss World 1988.

Country/Territory	Contestant	Age	Hometown	Preliminary Scores
Argentina	Gabriela Madeira	19	Buenos Aires	18
Australia	Catherine Bushell	21	Sydney	26
Austria	Alexandra Werbanschitz	21	Graz	25
(The Bahamas) Bahamas	Natasha Rolle	21	Nassau	18
Barbados	Ferida Kola	20	Bridgetown	18
Belgium	Daisy van Cauwenbergh	19	Limbourg	19
Belize	Pauline Young	19	Belize City	18
Bermuda	Sophie Cannonier	19	Warwick East	19
Bolivia	Claudia Nazer	24	Tarija	18
British Virgin Islands	Nelda Farrington	22	Tortola	19
Bulgaria	Sonia Vassilieva	19	Varna	18
Canada	Morgan Fox	18	Richmond	19
Cayman Islands	Melissa McTaggart	23	Grand Cayman	20
Chile	María Francisca Aldunate	22	Santiago	20
Colombia	Jasmín Oliveros	20	Bahía Solano	18
Cook Islands	Annie Wigmore	17	Titikaveka	18
Costa Rica	Virginia Steinvort	19	San José	18
Curaçao	Anuschka Cova	19	Willemstad	18
Cyprus	Aphrodite Theophanous	18	Paphos	18
Denmark	Susanne Johansen	24	Copenhagen	20
Dominican Republic	María Josefina Martínez	21	San Ignacio de Sabaneta	23
Ecuador	Cristina López	20	Guayaquil	20
Egypt	Dina El Naggar	20	Giza	19
El Salvador	Karla Hasbún	17	San Salvador	19
Finland	Nina Andersson	21	Lahti	24
France	Claudia Frittolini	20	Illzach	18
Ghana	Dzidzo Abra Amoa	23	Volta	20
Gibraltar	Tatiana Desoiza	23	Gibraltar	18
Greece	Ariadni Mylona	19	Chania	18
Guam	Rita Mae Diaz	23	Windward Hills	18
Guatemala	Mariluz Aguilar	18	Guatemala City	23
Guyana	Christine Jardim	20	Georgetown	18
(Netherlands) Holland	Angela Visser	21	Rotterdam	23
Honduras	Alina Patricia Díaz	19	Choluteca	18
(British Hong Kong) Hong Kong	Michelle Reis	18	Kowloon	23
Iceland	Linda Pétursdóttir	18	Vopnafjörður	31
India	Anuradha Kottoor	22	Bombay	18
(Republic of Ireland) Ireland	Colette Jackson	22	Coolock	23
Isle of Man	Victoria O'Dea	17	Douglas	18
Israel	Dganit Cohen	18	Tel Aviv	21
Italy	Giulia Gemo	18	Modena	20
Jamaica	Andrea Haynes	24	Kingston	21
Japan	Kazumi Sakikubo	22	Kobe	18
Kenya	Dianna Naylor	21	Mombasa	21
Lebanon	Sylvana Samaha	19	Beirut	18
Liberia	Ollie White	19	Nimba	18
Luxembourg	Chantal Schanbacher	22	Altrier	20
Macau	Helena da Conceição Lo Branco	19	Macau	18
Malaysia	Sue Wong	19	Penang	18
Malta	Josette Camilleri	21	Marsa	18
Mauritius	Véronique Ash	21	Beau Bassin	18
Mexico	Cecilia Cervera	20	Tlaxcala	20
New Zealand	Lisa Corban	19	Tokoroa	19
Nigeria	Omasan Buwa	22	Warri	19
Norway	Rita Paulsen	21	Myrvoll	25
Papua New Guinea	Erue Taunao	19	Port Moresby	18
Paraguay	María José Miranda	19	Asunción	18
Peru	Martha Kaik	21	Lima	18
Philippines	Dana Narvadez	19	Manila	18
(Polish People's Republic) Poland	Joanna Gapinska	20	Szczecin	20
Portugal	Helena Isabel de Cunha Laureano	20	Sesimbra	18
Saint Kitts and Nevis	Hailey Cassius	21	Newtown	18
Sierra Leone	Tiwilla Ojukutu	21	Freetown	18
Singapore	Shirley Teo	23	Singapore	20
South Korea (Note: Competed as Korea in the pageant)	Choi Yeon-hee	22	Seoul	25
Spain	Susana de la Llave	19	Figueres	26
Sri Lanka	Michelle Koelmeyer	18	Colombo	18
(Eswatini) Swaziland	Thandeka Magagula	22	Manzini	19
Sweden	Cecilia Hörberg	22	Gothenburg	28
Switzerland	Karina Berger	20	Zürich	21
Taiwan (Note: Competed as China Taiwan in the pageant)	Wu Yi-ning	17	Taipei	18
Thailand	Prapatsara Chutanutpong	18	Bangkok	19
Trinidad and Tobago	Wendy Baptiste	19	Arouca	24
Turkey	Esra Sumer	19	Istanbul	18
Turks and Caicos Islands	Doreen Dickenson	20	Grand Turk	18
Uganda	Nazma Mohamed	20	Entebbe	18
United Kingdom	Kirsty Roper	17	Staffordshire	29
United States	Diana Magaña	23	Rancho Palos Verdes	27
United States Virgin Islands	Cathy Mae Sitaram	19	St. Croix	18
Uruguay	Gisel Silva	19	Montevideo	18
Venezuela	Emma Rabbe	19	La Guaira	29
West Germany (Note: Competed as Germany in the pageant)	Katja Munch	19	Frankfurt	21
Western Samoa	Noanoa Hill	17	Apia	18
(Socialist Federal Republic of Yugoslavia) Yugoslavia	Suzana Žunić	17	Split	18

== Notes ==
=== Other Notes ===
- Angela Visser competed in Miss Universe 1989, in May 1989, she only had seven months to prepare to Miss Universe before going to win.
