= Miss World 1990 =

40th Miss World pageant

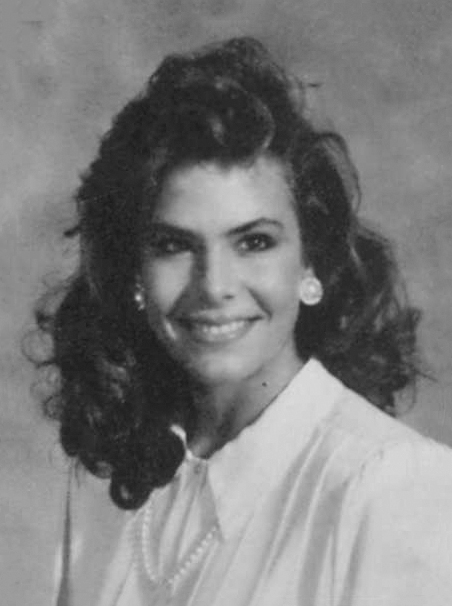
- Gina Tolleson
- Date: 8 November 1990
- Presenters: Peter Marshall; Michelle Rocca
- Entertainment: Jason Donovan; Richard Clayderman
- Venue: London Palladium, London, United Kingdom
- Broadcaster: E!; Thames Television
- Entrants: 81
- Placements: 10
- Debuts: Romania
- Withdrawals: Bermuda; Ecuador; Guyana; Malaysia; Saint Vincent and the Grenadines; Taiwan; Uganda
- Returns: Barbados; Brazil; British Virgin Islands; Bulgaria; Cook Islands; Egypt; India; Madagascar; Uruguay
- Winner: Gina Tolleson; United States
- Personality: Sabina Umeh (Nigeria)
- Photogenic: Sharon Luengo (Venezuela)

Miss World 1990, the 40th anniversary of the Miss World pageant, was held on 8 November 1990 at the London Palladium in London, United Kingdom.

The winner was Gina Tolleson representing the United States. She was crowned by Miss World 1989, Aneta Beata Kreglicka of Poland. After this event, the Miss World competition began staging outside the United Kingdom; in places such as in Atlanta, Hong Kong and Sun City, South Africa. This is the second time that the United States representative won Miss World, the other being Marjorie Wallace in 1973. Although Wallace was later dethroned (But still she is the official titleholder of Miss World 1973 and the title was not passed during her dethronement, but only the responsibilities was passed), Tolleson was allowed to crown her successor the following year in 1991. Runner-Up was Siobhan McClafferty from Ireland, and third was Sharon Luengo from Venezuela.

== Debuts, returns, and, withdrawals ==
This edition marked the debut of Romania and the return of Madagascar, which last competed in 1974, Brazil in 1987 and Barbados, the British Virgin Islands, Bulgaria, Cook Islands, Egypt, India and Uruguay in 1988.

Bermuda, Ecuador, Guyana, Malaysia, Saint Vincent and the Grenadines, Taiwan and Uganda, Withdrew from the competition.

== Results ==
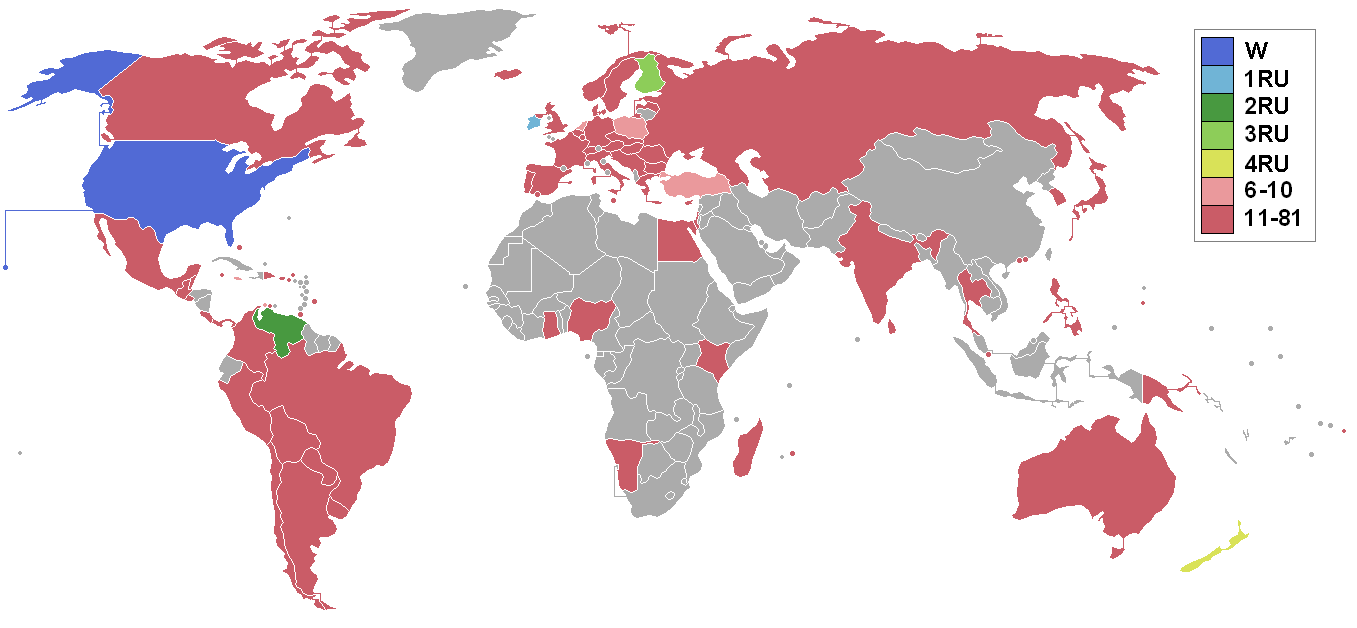
Countries and territories which sent delegates and results for Miss World 1990

=== Placements ===
Placement	Contestant
Miss World 1990	United States – Gina Tolleson
1st Runner-Up	Ireland – Siobhan McClafferty
2nd Runner-Up	Venezuela – Sharon Luengo
Top 5	Finland – Nina Björkfelt; New Zealand – Adelle Kenny
Top 10	Aruba – Gwendolyne Kwidama; Holland – Gabrielle Stap; Jamaica – Erica Aquart; Poland – Ewa Szymczak; Turkey – Jülide Ates

==== Continental Queens of Beauty ====
Continental Group	Contestant
Africa	Kenya – Aisha Wawira Lieberg
Americas	United States – Gina Tolleson
Asia & Oceania	New Zealand – Adelle Kenny
Caribbean	Jamaica – Erica Aquart
Europe	Ireland – Siobhan McClafferty

== Judges ==
- Eric Morley – Chairman and CEO of Miss World Organization
- Krish Naidoo
- Josie Fonseca
- Michael Ward
- Kimberley Santos – Miss World 1980 from Guam
- Wilnelia Merced – Miss World 1975 from Puerto Rico
- Ralph Halpern
- Rob Brandt
- Knut Meiner
- Ruth Moxnes
- Thomas Ledin
- Terje Aass
- Ann-Mari Albertsen
- Jarle Johansen
- Ingeborg Sørensen – Miss Norway 1972

== Contestants ==
Country/Territory	Contestant	Age	Hometown	Preliminary Score
Argentina	Romina Rosales	19	Buenos Aires	30
Aruba	Gwendolyne Charlotte Kwidama	20	Sint Nicolaas	41
Australia	Karina Brown	19	Sydney	39
Austria	Carina Friedberger	20	Eisenerz	33
(The Bahamas) Bahamas	Lisa Gizelle Strachan	19	Nassau	33
Barbados	Cheryl Jean Brewster	22	Saint Philip	30
Belgium	Katia Alens	23	Antwerp	33
Belize	Ysela Antonia Zabaneh	20	Independence	30
Bolivia	Daniela Domínguez Martilotti	17	Tarija	31
Brazil	Karla Cristina Kwiatkowski	20	Curitiba	35
British Virgin Islands	Suzanne Spencer	22	Tortola	33
Bulgaria	Violeta Galabova	18	Sofia	31
Canada	Natasha Palewandrem	22	Ottawa	35
Cayman Islands	Bethea Michelle Christian	17	Grand Cayman	30
Chile	María Isabel Jara Pizarro	21	Santiago	35
Colombia	Angela Mercedes Mariño Ortiz	19	Bogotá	38
Cook Islands	Angela Manarang	23	Rarotonga	30
Costa Rica	Andrea Murillo Fallas	20	Heredia	31
Curaçao	Jacqueline Nelleke Josien Krijger	23	Willemstad	33
Cyprus	Emilia Groutidou	18	Nicosia	30
Czechoslovakia	Andrea Roskovcová	19	Benešov	33
Denmark	Charlotte Christiansen	23	Copenhagen	35
Dominican Republic	Brenda Marte Lajara	21	Santo Domingo	30
Egypt	Dalia El Behery	20	Cairo	31
El Salvador	María Elena Henríquez	20	San Salvador	31
Finland	Nina Björkfelt	22	Turku	40
France	Gaëlle Voiry	21	Bordeaux	30
Germany	Christiane Stocker	23	Darmstadt	39
Ghana	Dela Tamakloe	24	Accra	30
Gibraltar	Sarah Yeats	18	Gibraltar	33
Greece	Sophia Lafkioti	19	Athens	31
Guam	Mary Esteban	22	Dededo	32
Guatemala	María del Rosario Pérez Aguilar	25	Guatemala City	30
(Netherlands) Holland	Gabrielle Stap	21	The Hague	46
Honduras	Claudia Bendaña McCausland	21	Tegucigalpa	30
(British Hong Kong) Hong Kong	Elaine da Silva	18	Sai Kung	31
Hungary	Kinga Czuczor	20	Budapest	32
Iceland	Ásta Sigríður Einarsdóttir	19	Garðabær	30
India	Naveeda Mehdi	18	Bombay	35
(Republic of Ireland) Ireland	Siobhan McClafferty	20	Dublin	43
Israel	Ariela Tesler	18	Tel Aviv	30
Italy	Cristina Gavagnin	19	Trieste	32
Jamaica	Erica Aquart	20	Kingston	42
Japan	Tomoko Iwasaki	20	Shizuoka	30
Kenya	Aisha Wawira Lieberg	19	Embu	32
(Latvian Soviet Socialist Republic) Latvia	Velga Bražņevica	23	Riga	38
Luxembourg	Bea Jarzyńska	18	Luxembourg City	30
Macau	Alexandra Paula Costa Mendes	19	Macau	30
Madagascar	Ellys Raza	20	Antananarivo	30
Malta	Karen Demicoli	18	Żejtun	30
Mauritius	Marie Desirée Audrey Pitchen	23	Beau Bassin	30
Mexico	Luz María Mena Basso	23	Mérida	40
(South West Africa) Namibia	Ronel Liebenberg	22	Windhoek	30
New Zealand	Adelle Kenny	17	Marlborough	42
Nigeria	Sabina Umeh	21	Lagos	30
Norway	Ingeborg Kolseth	20	Hundorp	33
Panama	Madelaine Leignadier Dawson	20	Panama City	30
Papua New Guinea	Nellie Ban	23	Manus	30
Paraguay	Alba María Cordero Rivals	21	Asunción	31
Peru	Gisselle Martínez Cuadros	21	Lima	38
Philippines	Antonette Elizalde Ballesteros	23	Manila	30
Poland	Ewa Maria Szymczak	23	Warsaw	40
Portugal	Filomena Paula Dias Miranda Marques	22	Lisbon	31
Puerto Rico	Magdalena Pabón	23	San Juan	35
Romania	Mihaela Raescu	22	Craiova	35
Singapore	Karen Frances Ng	17	Singapore	30
South Korea (Note: competed as Korea)	Go Hyun-jung	19	Seoul	35
Spain	María del Carmen Carrasco García	22	Madrid	32
Sri Lanka	Angela Mary Jane Gunasekera	23	Colombo	30
Sweden	Daniela Jessica Maria Almen	19	Västerås	33
Switzerland	Priscilla Leimgruber	20	Bulle	30
Thailand	Panida Umsaard	19	Bangkok	30
Trinidad and Tobago	Guenevere Helen Kelshall	22	Port of Spain	35
Turkey	Jülide Ates	19	Istanbul	41
(Soviet Union) Union of Soviet Socialist Republics (Note: competed as U.S.S.R.)	Lauma Zemzare	19	Moscow	37
United Kingdom	Helen Upton	19	Birmingham	39
United States	Gina Tolleson	21	Charleston	49
United States Virgin Islands (Note: competed as American Virgin Islands)	Keima Akintobi	17	Saint Thomas	37
Uruguay	María Carolina Casalia Abelia	19	Montevideo	32
Venezuela	Sharon Luengo	19	Maracaibo	50
(Socialist Federal Republic of Yugoslavia) Yugoslavia	Ivona Brnelić	18	Rijeka	31

== Notes ==
=== Debuts ===
- Romania competed in Miss World for the first time after the Miss World Organization allowed the nation to compete after a 24-year revolution.

There were two panels of judges, one in the United Kingdom and another in Norway, that commented Miss Venezuela to be “the best one”. This clip was removed from videos and she was placed 2nd Runner-Up.
