= Miss World 1989 =

Beauty pageant edition

- Miss World 1989 Titlecard
- Date: 22 November 1989
- Presenters: Peter Marshall; Alexandra Bastedo; John Davidson
- Entertainment: Aswad
- Venue: Hong Kong Convention and Exhibition Centre, Hong Kong
- Broadcaster: Asia Television
- Entrants: 78
- Placements: 10
- Debuts: Hungary; Latvia; Namibia; Union of Soviet Socialist Republics
- Withdrawals: Barbados; British Virgin Islands; Bulgaria; Cook Islands; Egypt; India; Isle of Man; Lebanon; Liberia; Saint Kitts and Nevis; Sierra Leone; Swaziland; Turks and Caicos Islands; Uruguay; Western Samoa
- Returns: Aruba; Czechoslovakia; Panama; Puerto Rico; Saint Vincent and the Grenadines
- Winner: Aneta Kręglicka; Poland
- Personality: Greet Ramaekers (Belgium)
- Photogenic: Anna Gorbunova (Soviet Union)

Miss World 1989, the 39th edition of the Miss World pageant, was held on 22 November 1989 at the Hong Kong Convention and Exhibition Centre, Hong Kong. 78 contestants competed in the pageant. It was the first time in history that the Miss World competition was staged outside of London. It was also the first time the Union of Soviet Socialist Republics had sent a contestant in any major pageant.

The winner was Aneta Kręglicka of Poland and was the first Eastern European person to win the competition. She was crowned by Linda Pétursdóttir of Iceland. The first and second runners-up respectively was Leanne Caputo of Canada and Mónica María Isaza of Colombia.

== Debuts, returns, and, withdrawals ==
This edition marked the debut of Hungary, Latvia, Namibia and Union of Soviet Socialist Republics. (Note: Also known as Soviet Union) and the returns of Czechoslovakia, which last competed in 1969, Aruba and Puerto Rico last competed in 1985 and Panama and Saint Vincent and the Grenadines last competed in 1987. On the other hand, Barbados, the British Virgin Islands, Bulgaria, Cook Islands, Egypt, India, Isle of Man, Lebanon, Liberia, Saint Kitts and Nevis, Sierra Leone, Swaziland, Turks and Caicos Islands, Uruguay and Western Samoa, withdrew from the competition.

== Results ==
=== Placements ===
Placement	Contestant
Miss World 1989	Poland – Aneta Kręglicka
1st Runner-Up	Canada – Leanne Caputo
2nd Runner-Up	Colombia – Mónica María Isaza
Top 10	Australia – Natalie Tania McCurry; Ireland – Barbara Curran; Mauritius – Jeanne Françoise Clement; Thailand – Prathumrat Woramali; United Kingdom – Suzanne Younger; United States – Jill Scheffert; United States Virgin Islands – Vanessa Thomas

==== Continental Queens of Beauty ====
Continental Group	Contestant
Africa	Mauritius – Jeanne-Françoise Clement
Americas	Canada – Leanne Caputo
Asia	Thailand – Prathumrat Woramali
Caribbean	United States Virgin Islands – Vanessa "Vania" Thomas
Europe	Poland – Aneta Kręglicka
Oceania	Australia – Natalie Tania McCurry

== Contestants ==
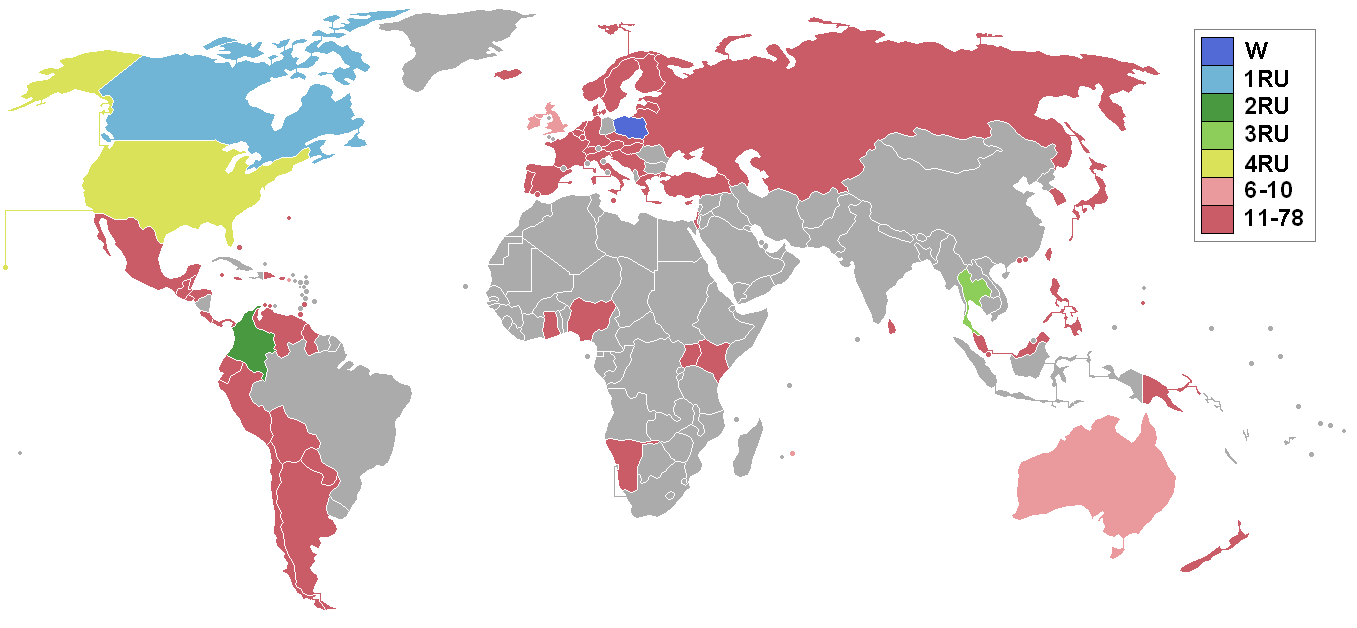
Countries and territories which sent delegates and results for Miss World 1989

78 contestants competed for the title.

Country/Territory	Contestant	Age	Hometown
Argentina	Patricia Wiedenhofer	17	La Pampa
Aruba	Dilailah Odor-Wever	20	Oranjestad
Australia	Natalie McCurry	23	North Bondi
Austria	Marion Amann	20	Vienna
(The Bahamas) Bahamas	Carolyn Moree	17	Nassau
Belgium	Greet Ramaekers	18	Limbourg
Belize	Martha Elena Badillo	20	San Pedro
Bermuda	Cherie Tannock	23	Warwick
Bolivia	María Victoria Julio	19	Tarija
Canada	Leanne Caputo	23	Milton
Cayman Islands	Michelle Garcia	20	Grand Cayman
Chile	Claudia Bahamondes	17	Santiago
Colombia	Mónica María Isaza	20	Medellín
Costa Rica	María Antonieta Sáenz	18	San José
Curaçao	Supharmy Sadji	19	Willemstad
Cyprus	Irma Voulgari	17	Larnaca
Czechoslovakia	Jana Hronková	22	Horšovský Týn
Denmark	Charlotte Pedersen	19	Holstebro
Dominican Republic	Irma Mauriz	23	San Felipe de Puerto Plata
Ecuador	Ximena Correa	19	Machala
El Salvador	Ana Estela Aguilar	20	San Salvador
Finland	Åsa Lövdahl	20	Helsinki
France	Stephanie Zlotkowski	17	Bordeaux
Ghana	Afua Amoah Bonsu	23	Accra
Gibraltar	Audrey Gingell	19	Gibraltar
Greece	Katerina Petropoulou	19	Athens
Guam	Cora Tricia Yanger	18	Mangilao
Guatemala	Rocío Lerma de la Vega	24	Guatemala City
Guyana	Lyla Shalimar Ryhaan Majeed	21	Georgetown
(Netherlands) Holland	Liesbeth Caspers	21	Noordwijk
Honduras	Belinda Bodden	18	San Pedro Sula
(British Hong Kong) Hong Kong	Ewong Yung-hung	21	Hong Kong Island
Hungary	Magdolna Gerloczy	18	Budapest
Iceland	Hugrún Guðmundsdóttir	20	Reykjavík
(Republic of Ireland) Ireland	Barbara Curran	23	Dublin
Israel	Ronit Sutton	19	Jerusalem
Italy	Paola Mercurio	17	Naples
Jamaica	Natasha Marcanik	19	Kingston
Japan	Kaori Muto	22	Tokyo
Kenya	Grace Chabari	22	Mombasa
(Latvian Soviet Socialist Republic) Latvia	Ina Magone	18	Liepāja
Luxembourg	Chris Scott	23	Luxembourg City
Macau	Guilhermina Madeira da Silva Pedruco	19	Macau
Malaysia	Vivien Chen Shee Yee	24	Kuching
Malta	Marika Micallef	18	Għargħur
Mauritius	Jeanne-Françoise Clement	20	Beau Bassin
Mexico	Nelia María Ochoa	19	Veracruz
(South Africa) Namibia	Emarencia Esterhuizen	22	Windhoek
New Zealand	Helen Rowney	19	Wellington
Nigeria	Bianca Onoh	22	Enugu
Norway	Bente Brunland	22	Oslo
Panama	Gloria Quintana	19	Panama City
Papua New Guinea	Joycelin Leahy	24	Morobe Province
Paraguay	Alicia María Jaime	20	Asunción
Peru	Maritza Zorrilla	20	Lima
Philippines	Estrella Querubin	20	Manila
(Polish People's Republic) Poland	Aneta Kręglicka	24	Gdańsk
Portugal	Maria Angélica Mira	18	Lisbon
Puerto Rico	Tania Collazo	18	Orocovis
Saint Vincent and the Grenadines	Anna Young	19	Kingstown
Singapore	Jacqueline Ang	18	Singapore
South Korea (Note: competed as Korea in the pageant)	Kim Hye-ri	19	Seoul
Spain	Eva Pedraza	18	Córdoba
Sri Lanka	Serena Danvers	21	Colombo
Sweden	Lena Berglind	23	Gothenburg
Switzerland	Catherine Mesot	23	Wil
Taiwan (Note: Also known as the Republic of China in the pageant)	Wang Min-yei	22	Taipei
Thailand	Prathumrat Woramali	17	Bangkok
Trinidad and Tobago	Samantha Bhagan	22	Goodwood Park
Turkey	Burcu Burkut	19	İzmir
Uganda	Doreen Lamon-Opira	20	Kampala
(Soviet Union) Union of Soviet Socialist Republics (Note: competed as Soviet Union in the pageant)	Anna Gorbunova	22	Moscow
United Kingdom	Suzanne Younger	23	Shrewsbury
United States	Jill Scheffert	21	Oklahoma City
United States Virgin Islands	Vanessa "Vania" Thomas	19	St. Thomas
Venezuela	Fabiola Candosín	19	Caracas
West Germany	Jasmine Beil	23	Frankfurt
(Socialist Federal Republic of Yugoslavia) Yugoslavia	Aleksandra Dobraš	17	Banja Luka

== Judges ==
- Eric Morley – Chairman and CEO of Miss World Organization
- Krish Naidoo
- Brian Daniels
- Rob Brandt
- Diane Hsin
- Peter Lam
- Giselle Laronde – Miss World 1986 from Trinidad and Tobago
- Richard Caring
- George Pitman

== Notes ==
=== Debuts ===
- Hungary
- Latvia (Latvian Soviet Socialist Republic)
- Namibia
- USSR

=== Returns ===
- Last competed in 1969:
  - Czechoslovakia
- Last competed in 1985:
  - Aruba
  - Puerto Rico
- Last competed in 1987:
  - Panama
  - Saint Vincent and the Grenadines

=== Replacements ===
- Soviet Union – Yulia Sukhanova did not compete due to parental refusal to sign any contract with the Miss USSR organizers due to being underaged or overaged.

=== Withdrawals ===
- Barbados
- British Virgin Islands
- Bulgaria
- Egypt
- India – National pageant postponed
- Lebanon – Due to a civil war
- Lithuania (Lithuanian Soviet Socialist Republic) - Liucija Gruzdytė
- Sierra Leone
- St. Kitts & Nevis
- Swaziland
- Turks & Caicos
- Uruguay
- Western Samoa

=== Other Notes ===
- Poland – Aneta Kręglicka competed in Miss International in 1989, securing the second position behind Iris Klein. Shortly after, she participated in Miss World and clinched the crown, making her the first Polish woman to achieve this honor. In 2021, Poland won Miss World for the second time, with Karolina Bielawska.
