= Miss World 1994 =

International beauty pageant

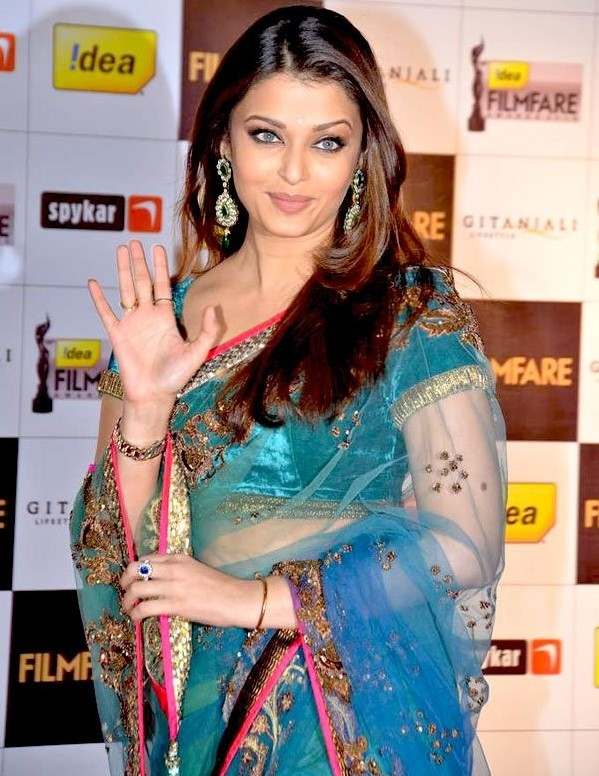
- Aishwarya Rai
- Date: 19 November 1994
- Presenters: Richard Steinmetz; Suanne Braun; Bronson Pinchot
- Venue: Sun City Entertainment Center, Sun City, South Africa
- Broadcaster: E!; SABC
- Entrants: 87
- Placements: 10
- Debuts: Bangladesh; China; Estonia
- Withdrawals: Aruba; Bermuda; El Salvador; Honduras; Lithuania; Malta; Namibia; Uganda; Uruguay
- Returns: Botswana; French Polynesia; Ghana; Hungary; Kenya; Peru; Romania; Saint Lucia; Saint Vincent and the Grenadines; Seychelles; Tanzania; Ukraine
- Winner: Aishwarya Rai; India
- Personality: Patinya Thongsri (Thailand)
- Best National Costume: Irene Ferreira (Venezuela)
- Photogenic: Aishwarya Rai (India)

Miss World 1994 was the 44th edition of the Miss World pageant, was held on 19 November 1994 and marked the third consecutive staging of Miss World in Sun City, South Africa. 87 contestants from around the world competed for the title. Lisa Hanna of Jamaica crowned her successor Aishwarya Rai of India at the end of the event.

== Debuts, returns, and withdrawals ==
This edition marked the debut of Bangladesh, China and Estonia. And the return of Botswana, French Polynesia, Ghana, Hungary, Kenya, Peru, Romania, Saint Lucia, Saint Vincent and the Grenadines, Seychelles, Tanzania and Ukraine; Tanzania, which last competed in 1967, Botswana last competed in 1974, Saint Lucia last competed in 1975, French Polynesia last competed (as Tahiti) in 1985, Saint Vincent and the Grenadines last competed in 1989, Peru last competed in 1990, Ghana and Kenya last competed in 1991 and Hungary, Romania, Seychelles and Ukraine last competed in 1992.

Aruba, Bermuda, El Salvador, Honduras, Lithuania, Malta, Namibia, Uganda, and Uruguay withdrew from the competition.

== Results ==
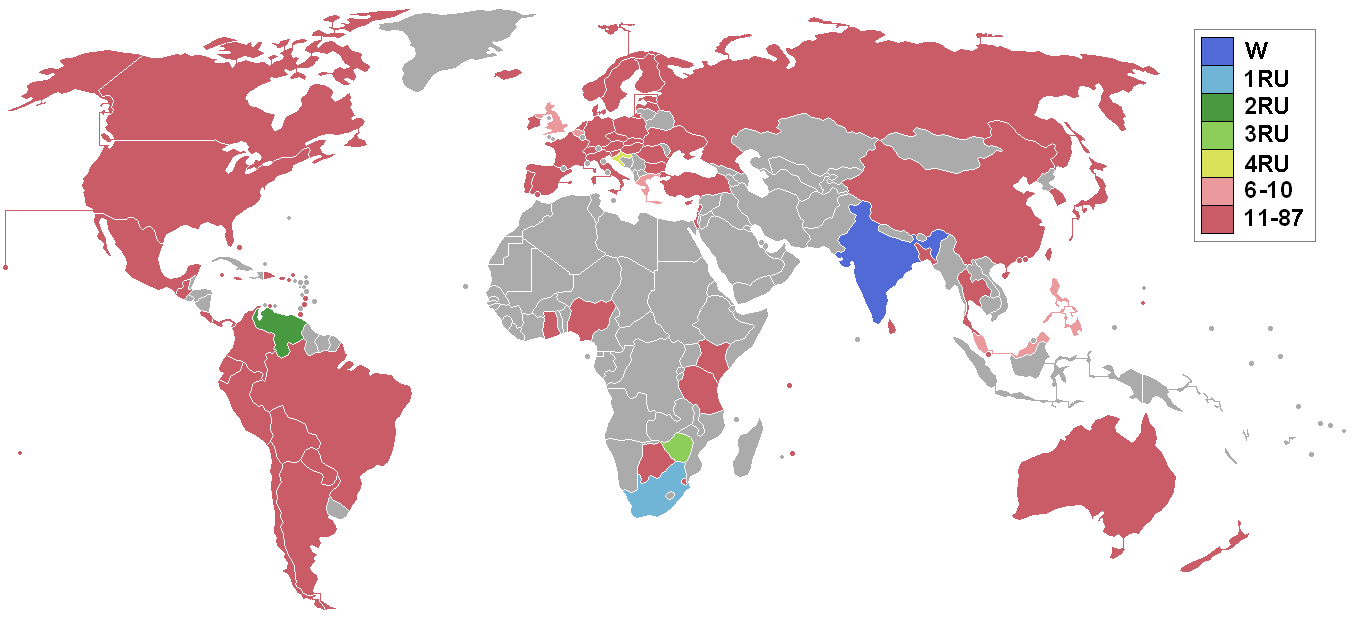
Countries and territories which sent delegates and results for Miss World 1994

=== Placements ===
Placement	Contestant
Miss World 1994	India – Aishwarya Rai
1st Runner-Up	South Africa – Basetsana Makgalemele
2nd Runner-Up	Venezuela – Irene Ferreira
Top 5	Croatia – Branka Bebić; Zimbabwe – Angeline Musasiwa
Top 10	Belgium – Ilse de Meulemeester; Greece – Evi Adam; Malaysia – Rahima Orchient Yayah; Philippines – Cara Subijano; United Kingdom – Melanie Abdoun

==== Continental Queens of Beauty ====
Continental Group	Contestant
Africa	South Africa – Basetsana Makgalemele
Americas	Venezuela – Irene Ferreira
Asia & Oceania	India – Aishwarya Rai
Caribbean	Cayman Islands – Anita Bush
Europe	Croatia – Branka Bebić

==== Special awards ====
Award	Contestant
Miss Photogenic	India – Aishwarya Rai
Miss Personality	Thailand – Patinya Thongsri
Best National Costume	Venezuela – Irene Ferreira

== Judges ==
- Eric Morley – Chairman and CEO of Miss World Organization
- Eileen Ford – founder, Ford Models agency
- Ronn Moss – Actor, The Bold and the Beautiful
- Katherine Kelly Lang – Actress, The Bold and the Beautiful
- Patrick Lichfield – Photographer
- Marsha Rae Ratcliff – Entertainer and Variety Clubs Ambassador
- Charles Dance – Actor (International Stage, Film, and Television)
- Iman – international supermodel
- Herb Ritts – Photographer
- Zindzi Mandela-Hlongwane – Daughter of Nelson Mandela
- Tony Leung Ka-fai – Actor，L'amant

== Contestants ==
Country/Territory	Contestant	Age (Note: Ages at the time of the pageant)	Hometown
Argentina	Miriam Elizabeth Nahón	22	Buenos Aires
Australia	Skye-Jilly Edwards	23	Hobart
Austria	Bianca Engel	20	Graz
(The Bahamas) Bahamas	Deanna North	23	Nassau
Bangladesh	Anika Taher	22	Dhaka
Belgium	Ilse de Meulemeester	23	Brussels
Bolivia	Mariela Arce	22	Cochabamba
Botswana	Hazel Mmopi	19	Gaborone
Brazil	Valquíria Blicharski	20	Curitiba
British Virgin Islands	Khara Forbes	19	Tortola
Bulgaria	Stella Ognianova	17	Sofia
Canada	Shawna Roberts	18	Calgary
Cayman Islands	Anita Bush	22	Grand Cayman
Chile	Yulissa del Pino	20	Santiago
China	Tao Pan	22	Shenzhen
Colombia	María Eugenia González	20	Bogotá
Costa Rica	Silvia Muñoz	19	San Marcos
Croatia	Branka Bebić	19	Split
Curaçao	Marisa Bos	18	Willemstad
Cyprus	Johanna Uwrin	17	Limassol
Czech Republic	Lenka Beličková	21	Karlovy Vary
Denmark	Sara Maria Wolf	19	Copenhagen
Dominican Republic	Claudia Franjul	24	Santo Domingo
Ecuador	Diana Noboa	24	Guayaquil
Estonia	Auli Andersalu	18	Tallinn
Finland	Mia Forsell	20	Askola
France	Radiah Latidine	19	Cayenne
French Polynesia (Note: Competed as Tahiti in the pageant)	Vaea Olanda	21	Papeete
Germany	Marte Helberg	18	Hamburg
Ghana	Matilda Alomatu	24	Accra
Gibraltar	Melissa Berllaque	17	Gibraltar
Greece	Evi Adam	21	Athens
Guam	Chalorna Freitas	23	Tamuning
Guatemala	Sonia María Rosales	19	Zacapa
(Netherlands) Holland	Yoshka Bon	19	Amsterdam
(British Hong Kong) Hong Kong	Annamarie Wood	20	Hong Kong
Hungary	Tímea Farkas	19	Záhony
Iceland	Birna Bragadóttir	19	Álftanes
India	Aishwarya Rai	21	Mangalore
(Republic of Ireland) Ireland	Anna McCarthy	22	Dublin
Israel	Shirly Schwatzberg	18	Tel Aviv
Italy	Arianna Novacco	19	Trieste
Jamaica	Johanna Ulett	22	Kingston
Japan	Shinobu Sushida	22	Miyazaki
Kenya	Josephine Mbatia	24	Nairobi
Latvia	Daina Tobija	20	Riga
Lebanon	Lara Badaoui	22	Keserwan
Macau	Ji-min Chen	20	Macau
Malaysia	Rahima Orchient Yayah	21	Kuala Lumpur
Mauritius	Priscilla Mardaymootoo	25	Port Louis
Mexico	Claudia Hernández	20	Santiago Ixcuintla
New Zealand	Shelley Edwards	22	Hastings
Nigeria	Susan Hart	19	Benue
Norway	Anne Lena Hansen	20	Harstad
Panama	Carmen Ogando	19	Colón
Paraguay	Jannyne Peyrat	20	Asunción
Peru	Marcia Pérez	21	Lima
Philippines	Cara Subijano	23	Manila
Poland	Jadwiga Flank	23	Bielsko-Biała
Portugal	Leonor Rodrigues	22	Lisbon
Puerto Rico	Joyce Giraud	19	Aguas Buenas
Romania	Leona Voicu	19	Bucharest
Russia	Anna Malova	23	Yaroslavl
Saint Lucia	Yasmine Walcott	21	Castries
Saint Vincent and the Grenadines	Cornise Yearwood	21	Georgetown
Seychelles	Marquise David	22	Victoria
Singapore	Angela Lee Pickard	20	Singapore
Slovakia	Karin Majtánová	20	Trenčín
Slovenia	Janja Zupan	20	Ljubljana
South Africa	Basetsana Makgalemele	20	Johannesburg
South Korea (Note: Competed as Korea in the pageant)	Yeon-hee Chae	22	Seoul
Spain	María Virginia Pareja	18	Barcelona
Sri Lanka	Nushara Fernando	20	Colombo
(Eswatini) Swaziland	Stephanie Wesselo	19	Mbabane
Sweden	Sofia Andersson	19	Stockholm
Switzerland	Sarah Briguet	24	Lausanne
Taiwan (Note: Also known as the Republic of China)	Joanne Wu	25	Taipei
Tanzania	Aina Maeda	20	Dodoma
Thailand	Patinya Thongsri	20	Bangkok
Trinidad and Tobago	Anabel Thomas	22	Port of Spain
Turkey	Pınar Altuğ	20	Istanbul
Ukraine	Nataliya Kozytska	20	Kyiv
United Kingdom	Melanie Abdoun	20	London
United States	Kristie Harmon	20	Conyers
United States Virgin Islands	Jessal Pearsall	17	St. Thomas
Venezuela	Irene Ferreira	18	Caracas
Zimbabwe	Angeline Musasiwa	21	Harare
