= Miss World 1986 =

Beauty pageant edition

- Miss World 1986 Titlecard
- Date: 13 November 1986
- Presenters: Peter Marshall; Mary Stävin
- Venue: Royal Albert Hall, London, United Kingdom
- Broadcaster: Thames Television
- Entrants: 77
- Placements: 15
- Debuts: Antigua and Barbuda; British Virgin Islands; Macau; Sierra Leone
- Withdrawals: Aruba; Côte d'Ivoire; Curaçao; French Polynesia; Liberia; Nigeria; Puerto Rico; Uganda; Zaire
- Returns: Honduras; Mauritius; Tonga; Turkey
- Winner: Giselle Laronde; Trinidad and Tobago

Miss World 1986, the 36th edition of the Miss World pageant, was held on 13 November 1986 at the Royal Albert Hall in London, United Kingdom.

The winner was Giselle Laronde from Trinidad and Tobago. She was crowned by Hólmfríður Karlsdóttir of Iceland. The first runner-up was Pia Rosenberg Larsen representing Denmark and the second runner-up was Chantal Schreiber representing Austria. Laronde was the only woman as of now from Trinidad and Tobago to capture the Miss World title.

== Background ==
=== Selection of participants ===
Contestants representing seventy-seven countries and territories were chosen to participate in the pageant. One candidate was appointed to represent her country to replace the original dethroned winner.

==== Replacements ====
The first runner-up of Miss Luxembourg 1986, Nathalie Wirion, was set to compete in the pageant, but was replaced by Miss Luxembourg Martine Pilot for undisclosed reasons.

==== Debuts, returns, and withdrawals ====
This edition marked the debut of Antigua and Barbuda, the British Virgin Islands, Macau and Sierra Leone. Returning countries for this edition included Mauritius, which last competed in 1980, Tonga and Turkey in 1983, and Honduras in 1984. Aruba, Côte d'Ivoire, Curaçao, French Polynesia (as Tahiti), Liberia, Nigeria, Puerto Rico, Uganda and Zaire withdrew from the competition.

== Results ==
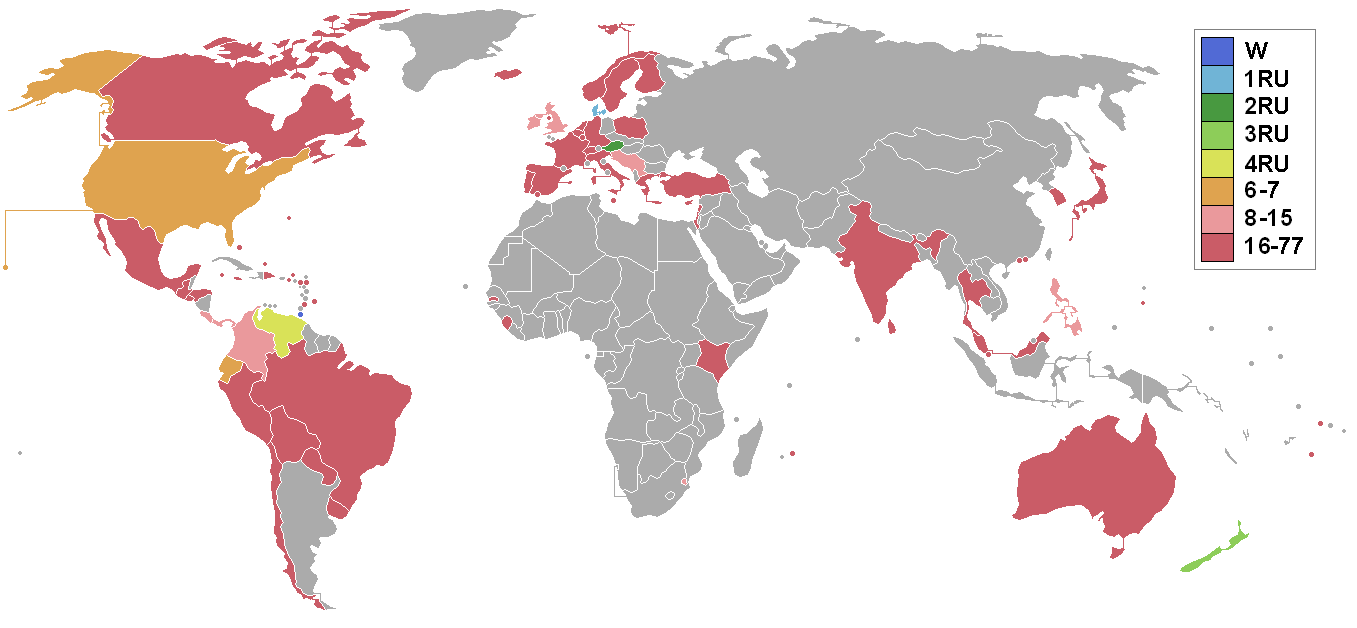
Countries and territories which sent delegates and results

=== Placements ===
Placement	Contestant
Miss World 1986	Trinidad and Tobago – Giselle Laronde
1st Runner-Up	Denmark – Pia Rosenberg Larsen
2nd Runner-Up	Austria – Chantal Schreiber
Top 7	Ecuador – Guisella Cucalón; New Zealand – Lynda McManus; United States – Halle Berry; Venezuela – María Begoña Juaristi
Top 15	Colombia – Karen Sue Wightman; Costa Rica – Ana Lorena González; Ireland – Rosemary Thompson; Panama – María Lorena Orillac; Philippines – Sherry-Rose Byrne; Swaziland – Ilana Lapidos; United Kingdom – Alison Slack; Yugoslavia – Maja Kučić

==== Continental Queens of Beauty ====
Continental Group	Contestant
Africa	Swaziland – Ilana Lapidos
Americas	Trinidad and Tobago – Giselle Laronde
Asia	Philippines – Sherry-Rose Byrne
Europe	Denmark – Pia Rosenberg Larsen
Oceania	New Zealand – Lynda McManus

== Judges ==
- Eric Morley - Chairman and CEO of Miss World Organization
- Lloyd Honeyghan
- Mrs. Arabella
- Nick Owen
- Robert Kalman
- Linda Womack
- Cecil Womack
- Ralph Halpern
- John Lloyd

== Contestants ==
Seventy-seven contestants competed for the title.

Country/Territory	Contestant	Age	Hometown
Antigua and Barbuda	Karen Knowles	19	St. John's
Australia	Stephanie Andrews	24	West Leederville
Austria	Chantal Schreiber	21	Vienna
(The Bahamas) Bahamas	Bridgette Strachan	17	Nassau
Barbados	Roslyn Williams	24	Saint Michael
Belgium	Goedele Liekens	23	Brussels
Bermuda	Samantha Jayne Morton	20	Pembroke West
Bolivia	Claudia Arévalo	17	Cochabamba
Brazil	Roberta Pereira da Silva	18	Itajai
British Virgin Islands	Anthonia Lewis	21	Tortola
Canada	Wynne Anita Kroontje	22	Sarnia
Cayman Islands	Deborah Cridland	21	George Town
Chile	Margot Elena Fuenzalida	22	Santiago
Colombia	Karen Sue Wightman	21	Barranquilla
Costa Rica	Ana Lorena González	21	San Jose
Cyprus	Maro Andreou	17	Limassol
Denmark	Pia Rosenberg Larsen	19	Frederiksberg
Dominican Republic	Susana González	19	Santiago
Ecuador	Guisella Cucalón	20	Guayaquil
El Salvador	Nadine Jeanpierre	18	San Salvador
Finland	Satu-Riitta Ala-Harja	19	Seinäjoki
France	Catherine Carew	21	Guadeloupe
(The Gambia) Gambia	Rose Marie Eunson	17	Banjul
Gibraltar	Dominique Martinez	20	Gibraltar
Greece	Anna Kechagia	19	Athens
Guam	Valerie Jean Flores	18	Agana
Guatemala	Sonia Schoenstedt	20	Guatemala City
(Netherlands) Holland	Janny ter Velde	17	Domburg
Honduras	Nilcer Viscovich	20	San Pedro Sula
(British Hong Kong) Hong Kong	May Ng	19	Kowloon Bay
Iceland	Gígja Birgisdóttir	18	Akureyri
India	Maureen Lestourgeon	24	Bombay
(Republic of Ireland) Ireland	Rosemary Thompson	20	Lisburn
Isle of Man	Sarah Therese Craig	21	Ballaugh
Israel	Osnat Moas	17	Motzkin
Italy	Enrica Patane	19	Rome
Jamaica	Lisa Mahfood	22	Kingston
Japan	Mutsumi Sugimura	19	Tokyo
Kenya	Patricia Maingi	20	Nairobi
Lebanon	Mireille Abi Fares	19	Beirut
Luxembourg	Martine Pilot	20	Erpeldange
Macau	Patricia Cheong	18	Macau
Malaysia	Joan Martha Cardoza	22	Kuala Lumpur
Malta	Andrea Licari	21	Floriana
Mauritius	Michelle Pastor	17	Quatre Bornes
Mexico	María de la Luz Velasco	20	Mexicali
Nicaragua	Marie Summers	18	Corn Island
New Zealand	Lynda McManus	20	Christchurch
Norway	Inger Louise Berg	18	Bodø
Panama	María Lorena Orillac	20	Panama City
Paraguay	Verónica Angulo	20	Asunción
Peru	Patricia Kuypers	22	Lima
Philippines	Sherry Rose Austria Byrne	18	Manila
(Polish People's Republic) Poland	Renata Fatla	19	Bielsko-Biała
Portugal	Elsa Maria Rodrigues	19	Lisbon
Saint Kitts and Nevis	Jacqueline Heyliger	20	Basseterre
Saint Vincent and the Grenadines	Mandy Haydock	21	Kingstown
Sierra Leone	Alice Matta Fefegula	22	Bo
Singapore	Michelle Loh	20	Bedok
South Korea (Note: Competed as Korea in the pageant)	An Jung-mi	19	Seoul
Spain	Remedios Cervantes	22	Málaga
Sri Lanka	Indira Gunaratne	20	Colombo
(Eswatini) Swaziland	Ilana Faye Lapidos	18	Manzini
Sweden	Elizabeth Ulvan	21	Motala
Switzerland	Renate Walther	22	Megève
Thailand	Sangravee as-Savarak	18	Bangkok
Tonga	Kerry Cowley	20	Nuku'alofa
Trinidad and Tobago	Giselle Laronde	23	Marabella
Turkey	Meltem Doganay	18	Ankara
Turks and Caicos Islands	Carmelita Ariza	17	Grand Turk
United Kingdom	Alison Louise Slack	20	Sheffield
United States	Halle Berry	20	Oakwood
United States Virgin Islands	Carmen Acosta	21	Saint Croix
Uruguay	Alexandra Goldenthal	17	Montevideo
Venezuela	María Begoña Juaristi	18	Maracaibo
West Germany	Dagmar Schulz	21	Duisburg
Western Samoa	Kasileta Gabriel	19	Apia
(Socialist Federal Republic of Yugoslavia) Yugoslavia	Maja Kučić	17	Split

== Notes ==
=== Withdrawals ===
Aruba and Puerto Rico lost its Miss World franchise due to financial assistance issues.

== Other Notes ==
- (Turks and Caicos Islands) Turks and Caicos – Carmelita Louise Ariza competed in the 1987 pageant in Singapore, where she achieved a Top 10 placement. She made history by being the first and only representative from Turk and Caicos to reach this milestone in Miss Universe.
