= Miss World 1987 =

Beauty pageant edition

- Miss World 1987 Titlecard
- Date: 12 November 1987
- Presenters: Peter Marshall; Alexandra Bastedo
- Entertainment: Rick Astley
- Venue: Royal Albert Hall, London, United Kingdom
- Broadcaster: Thames Television
- Entrants: 78
- Placements: 12
- Debuts: Belize; Cook Islands
- Withdrawals: Antigua and Barbuda; British Virgin Islands; Gambia; Sierra Leone; Tonga
- Returns: Argentina; Curaçao; Nigeria; Papua New Guinea
- Winner: Ulla Weigerstorfer; Austria

Miss World 1987, the 37th edition of the Miss World pageant, was held on 12 November 1987 at the Royal Albert Hall in London, United Kingdom.

The winner was Ulla Weigerstorfer (Queen of Europe) from Austria. She was crowned by Giselle Laronde of Trinidad and Tobago. Runner-up was Albani Lozada (Queen of Americas) from Venezuela, and third was Anna Margrét Jónsdóttir from Iceland. It is the second victory of Austria in the pageant.

This edition marked the debut of Belize and Cook Islands, and the return of Argentina and Papua New Guinea, which last competed in 1981 and Curaçao and Nigeria last competed in 1985. Antigua and Barbuda, the British Virgin Islands, the Gambia, Sierra Leone and Tonga, withdrew from the competition for unknown reasons.

== Results ==
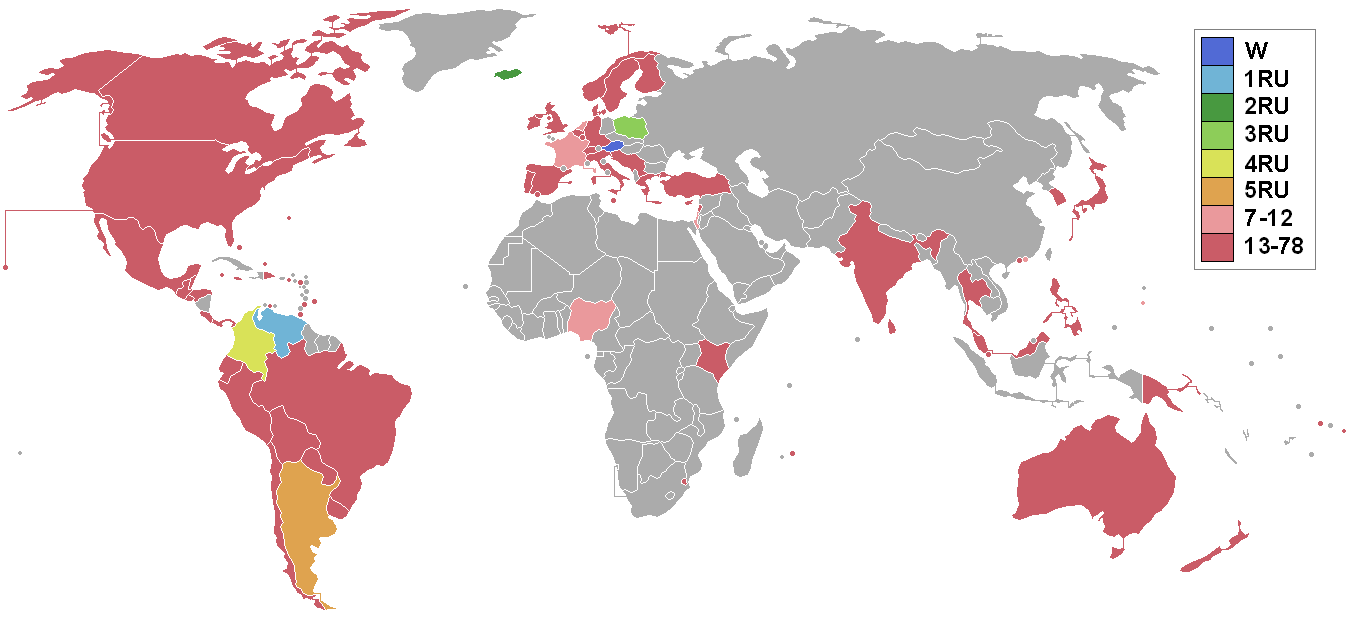
Countries and territories which sent delegates and results for Miss World 1987

=== Placements ===
Placement	Contestant
Miss World 1987	Austria – Ulla Weigerstorfer
1st Runner-Up	Venezuela – Albani Lozada
2nd Runner-Up	Iceland – Anna Margret Jónsdóttir
Top 6	Argentina – Katerina Ciscato; Colombia – Claudia Mercedes Escobar; Poland – Monika Nowosadko
Top 12	France – Nathalie Marquay; Guam – Francel Manibog Caracol; Holland – Angelique Cremers; Hong Kong – Pauline Yeung; Israel – Ya'el Gerthler; Nigeria – Mary Ngozi Bienoseh

=== Continental Queens of Beauty ===
Continental Group	Contestant
Africas	Nigeria – Mary Ngozi Bienoseh
Americas	Venezuela – Albani Lozada
Asia	Hong Kong – Pauline Yeung
Europe	Austria – Ulla Weigerstorfer
Oceania	Guam – Francel Manibog Caracol

== Judges ==
- Eric Morley † – Chairperson of Miss World
- Linford Christie
- Robert Coleman
- John Coleman
- Pilín León – Miss World 1981 from Venezuela
- Hayley Mills
- Albert Vinci
- Rick Wakeman
- Simon Williams

== Contestants ==
78 countries participated in Miss World 1987.

Country/Territory	Contestant	Age (Note: Ages at the time of the pageant)	Hometown
Argentina	Katerina Ciscato	17	La Plata
Australia	Donna Rudrum	23	Melbourne
Austria	Ulla Weigerstorfer	20	Vienna
(The Bahamas) Bahamas	Indira Wood	21	Nassau
Barbados	Dawn Michelle Waithe	19	Bridgetown
Belgium	Lynn Wesenbeek	24	Antwerp
Belize	Janine Sylvestre	20	Belize City
Bermuda	Kim Elizabeth Johnston	20	Southampton
Bolivia	Birgit Ellefsen	19	Cochabamba
Brazil	Simone Augusto Costa da Silva	20	Recife
Canada	Tracey Westerholm	24	Vancouver
Cayman Islands	Desirée Ann Hunter	22	Grand Cayman
Chile	Yasna Vukasovic	18	Punta Arenas
Colombia	Claudia Mercedes Escobar	21	Cali
Cook Islands	Michelle Leone Oberg	21	Rarotonga
Costa Rica	Alejandra Martínez	20	Cartago
Curaçao	Diana Fraai	18	Willemstad
Cyprus	Niki Christou	20	Nicosia
Denmark	Zelma Hesselmann	17	Copenhagen
Dominican Republic	Paula del Carmen Lora	21	Salcedo
Ecuador	Cecilia Pozo	21	Guayaquil
El Salvador	Claudia Alvarenga	19	San Salvador
Finland	Minna Rinnetmäki	19	Tampere
France	Nathalie Marquay	20	Mulhouse
Gibraltar	Mayte Sanchez	19	Gibraltar
Greece	Helen Moskiou	20	Athens
Guam	Francel Manibog Caracol	24	Tumon
Guatemala	Mábel Hernández	24	Chinautla
(Netherlands) Holland	Angelique Cremers	22	Schinveld
Honduras	Claudia María Paz	18	San Pedro Sula
(British Hong Kong) Hong Kong	Pauline Yeung	20	Hong Kong Island
Iceland	Anna Margret Jónsdóttir	21	Reykjavík
India	Manisha Kohli	17	Bombay
(Republic of Ireland) Ireland	Adrienne Rock	22	Dublin
Isle of Man	Lesley Henthorn	18	Greeba
Israel	Ya'el Gerthler	19	Rehovot
Italy	Barbara Martinuzzi	17	Turin
Jamaica	Janice Whittingham	20	Kingston
Japan	Keiko Unno	20	Tokyo
Kenya	Sheila Kegode	21	Nairobi
Lebanon	Josiane Haddad	21	Beirut
Luxembourg	Claudine Atten	24	Erpeldange
Macau	Olívia do Rosário	17	Macau
Malaysia	Sheela Shankar	23	Kuala Lumpur
Malta	Joanne Corser	18	Paola
Mauritius	Marie-France Mamet	25	Grand Bay
Mexico	Elizabeth Carrillo	20	Mazatlán
New Zealand	Karyn Metcalf	18	Manukau City
Nigeria	Mary Ngozi Bienoseh	19	Benue
Norway	Mette Veiseth	18	Namsos
Panama	María Cordelia Denis	19	Panama City
Papua New Guinea	Harriet Joan Warren	19	Port Moresby
Paraguay	Lourdes Stanley	19	Hohenhau
Peru	Suzette Woodman	21	Lima
Philippines	Maria Lourdes Apostol	21	Manila
Poland	Monika Nowosadko	23	Kolobrzeg
Portugal	Paula Isabel Leal do Sousa	18	Lisbon
Saint Kitts and Nevis	Jennifer Hensley	20	Basseterre
Saint Vincent and the Grenadines	Nicole Hadaway	19	Kingstown
Singapore	Janicia Koh	21	Spottiswoode Park
South Korea (Note: Competed as Korea in the pageant)	Chung Myoung-sun	22	Seoul
Spain	Sonsoles Artigas	20	Las Palmas
Sri Lanka	Priyanjali de Alwis	21	Dehiwala
(Eswatini) Swaziland	Phindile Simelane	17	Mbabane
Sweden	Karin Trydell	18	Laholm
Switzerland	Gabriela Bigler	23	Bern
Thailand	Benjawan Srilapan	18	Bangkok
Trinidad and Tobago	Maria del Valle Xavier	18	Diego Martin
Turkey	Şebnem Dinçgor	17	Istanbul
Turks and Caicos Islands	Edna Smith	20	Grand Turk
United Kingdom	Karen Mellor	24	Barnsley
United States	Clotlide Cabrera	23	Tampa Bay
United States Virgin Islands	Lisa Pitram	17	St. Thomas
Uruguay	Mónica Borrea	23	Montevideo
Venezuela	Albani Lozada	22	Acarigua
West Germany	Christiane Kopp	19	Berlin
Western Samoa	Ainslie Berking	18	Apia
(Socialist Federal Republic of Yugoslavia) Yugoslavia	Matilda Sazdova	18	Skopje

== Notes ==
=== Withdrawals ===
- British Virgin Islands – because of the national pageant postponement
- Sierra Leone – because of the national pageant postponement
