= Miss World 1985 =

Beauty pageant edition

- Miss World 1985 Titlecard
- Date: 14 November 1985
- Presenters: Peter Marshall; Anne Diamond
- Entertainment: Jack Jones
- Venue: Royal Albert Hall, London, United Kingdom
- Broadcaster: Thames Television
- Entrants: 78
- Placements: 15
- Debuts: Côte d'Ivoire; Saint Kitts and Nevis; Zaire
- Withdrawals: Honduras
- Returns: Liberia; Luxembourg; Saint Vincent and the Grenadines; Uganda
- Winner: Hólmfríður Karlsdóttir; Iceland

Miss World 1985, the 35th edition of the Miss World pageant, was held on 14 November 1985 at the Royal Albert Hall in London, United Kingdom. 78 contestants from all over the world competed for the coveted title.

At the end of the event, Astrid Carolina Herrera of Venezuela crowned Hólmfríður Karlsdóttir of Iceland as the new Miss World at the end of the event. This was Iceland's first victory in the pageant. The first and second runners-up are Mandy Shires of the United Kingdom and Brenda Denton of the United States.

This edition marked the debut of Côte d'Ivoire, Saint Kitts and Nevis and Zaire. And the return of Uganda, which last competed in 1968, Luxembourg last competed in 1977, Saint Vincent and the Grenadines last competed (as Saint Vincent) in 1978 and Liberia last competed in 1983.

Honduras withdrew from the competition for unknown reasons.

== Results ==
=== Placements ===
Placement	Contestant
Miss World 1985	Iceland – Hólmfríður Karlsdóttir
1st Runner-Up	United Kingdom – Mandy Shires
2nd Runner-Up	United States – Brenda Denton
Top 7	Israel – Maja Wechtenhaim; Jamaica – Alison Barnett; Switzerland – Eveline Glanzmann; Venezuela – Ruddy Rodríguez
Top 15	Brazil – Leila Bittencourt; Ireland – Anne Marie Gannon; New Zealand – Sheri Le Fleming Burrow; Paraguay – Daisy Ferreira; Poland – Katarzyna Zawidzka; Puerto Rico – Iris Matías; Sweden – Anne-Bolette Christophersson; Zaire – Benita Murekatete

=== Continental Queens of Beauty ===
Continental Group	Contestant
Africa	Zaire – Benita Kayonga Murekatete
Americas	United States – Brenda Denton
Asia	Israel – Maja Wechtenhaim
Europe	Iceland – Hólmfríður Karlsdóttir
Oceania	New Zealand – Sheri Le Fleming Burrow

== Judges ==
- Ibrahim Keita
- Graeme Souness
- Ralph Halpern
- Sarah-Jane Hutt – Miss World 1983 from United Kingdom
- Eric Morley – Chairman and CEO of Miss World Organization
- Duncan Goodhew
- Anne-Marie Moser
- Tan Sri Jeyaratnam
- Barry McGuigan

== Contestants ==
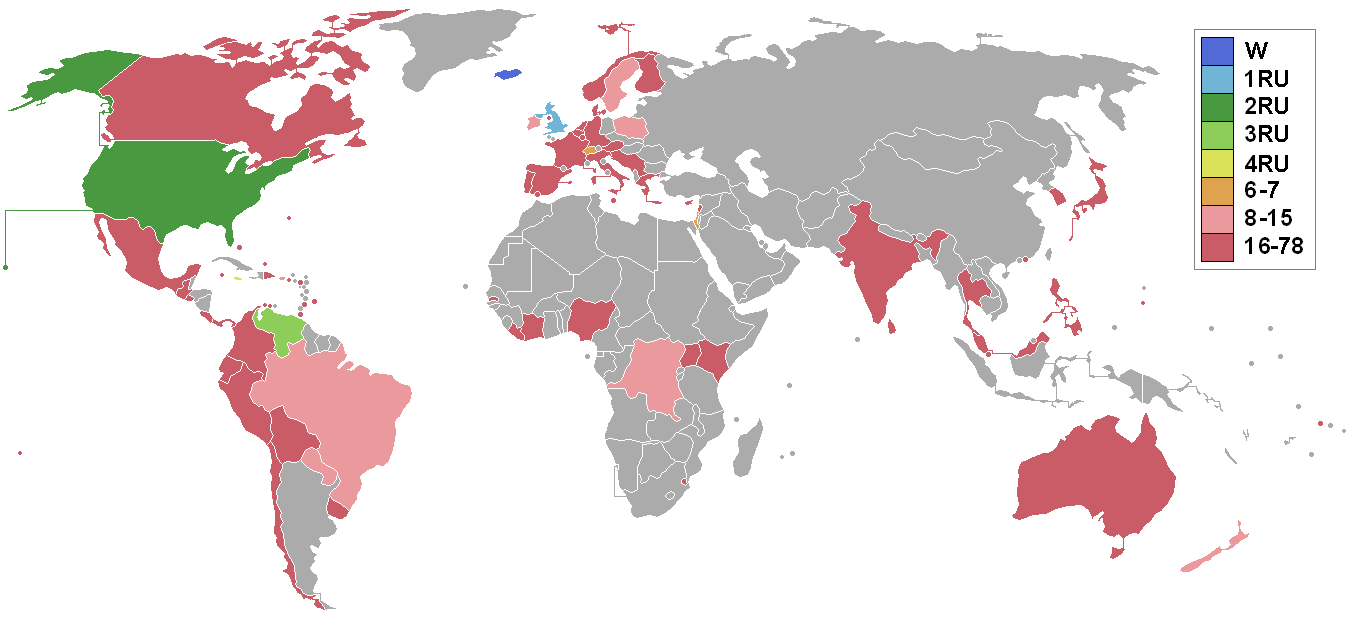
Countries and territories which sent delegates and results for Miss World 1985

78 contestants competed for the title.

Country	Contestant	Age	Hometown	Preliminary Score
Aruba	Jacqueline van Putten	24	Sint Nicolaas	20
Australia	Angelina Nasso	18	Sydney	21
Austria	Gabriele Maxonus	20	Salzburg	18
(The Bahamas) Bahamas	Rhonda Cornea	17	Abaco Island	20
Barbados	Elizabeth Wadman	19	Christ Church	19
Belgium	Ann van den Broeck	18	Antwerp	18
Bermuda	Jannell Ford	23	Devonshire	23
Bolivia	Carolina Abudinen	19	Santa Cruz	19
Brazil	Leila Bittencourt	19	Porto Alegre	28
Canada	Michelle Tambling	20	Toronto	19
Cayman Islands	Emily Hurlston	18	North Side	19
Chile	Lydia Labarca	20	Santiago	21
Colombia	Margarita Francisco	20	Santiago de Cali	23
Costa Rica	Marianela Herrera	19	San Jose	19
(Ivory Coast) Côte d'Ivoire (Note: Competed as Ivory Coast in the pageant)	Rose Armande Oulla	18	Abidjan	22
Curaçao	Lidushka Curiel	21	Willemstad	21
Cyprus	Juliana Kalogirou	18	Famagusta	18
Denmark	Jeanette Kröll	19	Odense	19
Dominican Republic	María Trinidad González	20	Santo Domingo	19
Ecuador	María del Pilar de Veintemilla	21	Quito	19
El Salvador	Luz del Carmen Mena	21	San Salvador	19
Finland	Marja Kinnunen	22	Tampere	26
France	Nathalie Jones	18	Nouméa	18
French Polynesia (Note: Competed as Tahiti in the pageant)	Ruth Manea	18	Faʻaʻā	18
(The Gambia) Gambia	Georgett Salleh	19	Brikama	18
Gibraltar	Gail Francis	22	Gibraltar	18
Greece	Epi Galanos	22	Athens	18
Guam	Therese Quintanilla	18	Agana	23
Guatemala	Maricela Luna	20	Guatemala City	19
(Netherlands) Holland	Brigitte Bergman	21	Utrecht	24
(British Hong Kong) Hong Kong	Aileen Lo	20	Hong Kong Island	21
Iceland	Hólmfríður Karlsdóttir	22	Reykjavík	34
India	Sharon Mary Clarke	18	New Delhi	24
(Republic of Ireland) Ireland	Anne Marie Gannon	19	Dublin	27
Isle of Man	Fiona Hartley	19	Douglas	23
Israel	Maja Wechtenhaim	21	Haifa	33
Italy	Cosetta Antoniolli	20	Milan	22
Jamaica	Alison Jean Barnett	19	Kingston	32
Japan	Haruko Sugimoto	22	Tokyo	18
Kenya	Jacqueline Mary Thom	18	Thika	20
Lebanon	Mary Khoury	25	Beirut	18
Liberia	Sarah Laurine Horton	18	Monrovia	18
Luxembourg	Beatrix Tinnemans	24	Luxembourg City	18
Malaysia	Rosalind Kong	21	Kuala Lumpur	18
Malta	Kristina Bologna	20	Mdina	18
Mexico	Alicia Yolanda Carrillo	23	Guadalajara	19
New Zealand	Sheri Le Fleming Burrow	20	Auckland	29
Nigeria	Rosemary Okeke	21	Lagos	18
Norway	Karen Margrethe Moe	18	Kristiansund	18
Panama	Diana Alfaro	24	Panama City	19
Paraguay	Daisy Ferreira	19	Asunción	33
Peru	Carmen del Rosario Muro	21	Lambayeque	19
Philippines	Elizabeth Cuenco	21	Manila	18
(Polish People's Republic) Poland	Katarzyna Zawidzka	23	Gorzów	32
Portugal	Fátima Raimundo	18	Cascais	19
Puerto Rico	Iris Matías	20	Caguas	30
Saint Kitts and Nevis	Karen Marcelle Grant	19	Old Road Town	19
Saint Vincent and the Grenadines	Donna Young	19	Kingstown	19
Singapore	Joanna Sylvia Mitchell	19	Paya Lebar	26
South Korea (Note: Competed as Korea in the pageant)	Park Eun-kyoung	22	Seoul	18
Spain	Amparo Martínez	23	Valencia	21
Sri Lanka	Natalie Gunewardene	22	Colombo	18
(Eswatini) Swaziland	June Hank	25	Manzini	19
Sweden	Anne-Bolette Christophersson	21	Stockholm	28
Switzerland	Eveline Glanzmann	20	Bauen	31
Thailand	Parnlekha Wanmuang	22	Bangkok	18
Trinidad and Tobago	Ulrica Phillip	21	San Fernando	20
Turks and Caicos Islands	Barbara Capron	18	Providenciales	19
Uganda	Helen Acheng	24	Kitgum	18
United Kingdom	Mandy Shires	19	Bradford	33
United States	Brenda Denton	22	Hobbs	31
United States Virgin Islands (Note: Competed as American Virgin Islands in the pageant)	Connie Colaire	23	Christiansted	19
Uruguay	Gabriela de León	19	Montevideo	20
Venezuela	Ruddy Rodríguez	18	Anaco	36
West Germany	Marion Morell	20	Stuttgart	20
Western Samoa	Angelie Achatz	21	Apia	18
(Socialist Federal Republic of Yugoslavia) Yugoslavia	Aleksandra Kosanović	23	Belgrade	21
Zaire	Benita Kayonga Murekatete	18	Kinshasa	24

== Notes ==
=== Other Notes ===
- This was the first time Iceland won Miss World
