= Miss World 1993 =

International beauty pageant

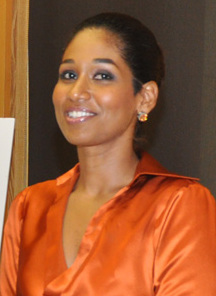
- Miss World 1993 titleholder - Lisa Hanna
- Date: 27 November 1993
- Presenters: Pierce Brosnan; Doreen Morris; Gina Tolleson; Kim Alexis
- Venue: Sun City Entertainment Center, Sun City, South Africa
- Broadcaster: E!; SABC
- Entrants: 81
- Placements: 10
- Debuts: Czech Republic; Lithuania; Slovakia
- Withdrawals: Czechoslovakia; Greenland; Hungary; Romania; Seychelles; Ukraine; Zambia
- Returns: Honduras; Zimbabwe
- Winner: Lisa Hanna; Jamaica
- Personality: Charlotte Als (Denmark)
- Best National Costume: Karminder Kaur-Virk (India)
- Photogenic: Barbara Chiappini (Italy)

Miss World 1993, the 43rd edition of the Miss World pageant, was held on 27 November 1993 at the Sun City Entertainment Centre in Sun City, South Africa. It was the second staging of the Miss World pageant in South Africa. The pageant secured 81 contestants from all over the world. This is the second consecutive staging of the pageant in Sun City.

At the end of the event, Lisa Hanna of Jamaica was crowned Miss World 1993 by the previous winner, Julia Kourotchkina of Russia. She became the third Jamaican to win Miss World since Carole Crawford in Miss World 1963 and Cindy Breakspeare in Miss World 1976. The first and second runners-up for this edition we're South Africa's Jacqueline Mofokeng and the Philippines' Ruffa Gutierrez.

== Selection of participants ==
=== Replacements ===
Miss Iceland 1993, Svala Björk Arnardóttir was replaced by her first runner up, Gudrun Rut Hreidarsdóttir due undisclosed reason. She went to Miss Universe 1994 instead. Anna Baychik of Russia unable to compete internationally due underage.

=== Debuts, returns, and, withdrawals ===
This edition marked the debut of the Czech Republic, Lithuania, and Slovakia and the return of Honduras and Zimbabwe; Zimbabwe last competed in 1982 and Honduras last competed in 1991.

Czechoslovakia, (Note: Czechoslovakia split into the Czech Republic and Slovakia on 1 January 1993.) Greenland, Hungary, Seychelles, Ukraine and Zambia, withdrew from the competition. Rita Onisca Muresan of Romania withdrew from the competition due lack of sponsor. Iryna Barabash of Ukraine, she got married few months prior the Miss World pageant.

China was supposed to participate for the first time in this edition through Pan Tao Wang-Yin, but this did not push through due to a problem with her visa. Wang-Yin participated in the next edition. Imela Nogic of Bosnia and Herzegovina, Sidorela Kola of Albania, and Lilia Uksvarav of Estonia also did not proceed in the competition for undisclosed reasons. Yugoslavia attempt tried to return in Miss World 1993 with Dragana Grahovac, winner of Miss Ju 1993 pageant under a new organization, but due the International sanctions against Yugoslavia by the Yugoslav Wars was denied participation until 1996 when the sanctions were lifted.

== Results ==
=== Placements ===
Placement	Contestant
Miss World 1993	Jamaica – Lisa Hanna
1st Runner-Up	South Africa – Jacqueline Mofokeng
2nd Runner-Up	Philippines – Ruffa Gutierrez
Top 5	Croatia – Fani Čapalija; Venezuela – Mónica Lei Scaccia
Top 10	Finland – Janina Frostell; France – Véronique de la Cruz; South Korea – Lee Seung-yeon; Sweden – Karin Victoria Silvstedt; United States – Maribeth Brown

== Judges ==
- Eric Morley † - Chairman and CEO of Miss World Organization
- Frederick Forsyth
- Grace Jones
- Vanessa Williams
- Louis Gossett Jr.
- Christie Brinkley
- Jackie Chan
- John Ratcliffe
- Dali Tambo
- Juliet Prowse †
- Twiggy

== Contestants ==
Country/Territory	Contestant	Age	Hometown
Argentina	Viviana Carcereri	19	Mendoza
Aruba	Christina van der Berg	18	Noord
Australia	Karen Ann Carwin	23	Brisbane
Austria	Jutta Ellinger	23	Vienna
(The Bahamas) Bahamas	Jacinda Sayde Francis	18	Nassau
Belgium	Stephanie Meire	23	Bruges
Bermuda	Kellie Hall	22	Southampton
Bolivia	Claudia Lorena Arrieta Justiniano	18	Santa Cruz de la Sierra
Brazil	Lyliá Virna	18	Maceió
British Virgin Islands	Kaida Donovan	18	Tortola
Bulgaria	Vera Roussinova	17	Sofia
Canada	Tanya Lynne Memme	22	Toronto
Cayman Islands	Audry Elizabeth Ebanks	20	Grand Cayman
Chile	Jessica Miroslava Eterovic Pozas	20	Punta Arenas
Colombia	Silvia Isabel Durán Angarita	23	Bucaramanga
Costa Rica	Laura Odio Salas	19	San José
Croatia	Fani Čapalija	18	Split
Curaçao	Sally Daflaar	19	Willemstad
Cyprus	Maria Magdalini Valianti	19	Larnaca
Czech Republic	Simona Smejkalová	19	Prague
Denmark	Charlotte Als	22	Copenhagen
Dominican Republic	Lynn Marie Álvarez Klinken	21	Concepción de La Vega
Ecuador	Danna Saab Saab	19	Guayaquil
El Salvador	Beatriz Eugenia Henríquez Pinto	21	San Salvador
Finland	Janina Frostell	20	Kuhmo
France	Véronique de la Cruz	19	Guadeloupe
Germany	Petra Klein	19	Ludwigsburg
Gibraltar	Jennifer Jane Ainsworth	18	Gibraltar
Greece	Mania Delou	19	Athens
Guam	Gina Burkhart	18	Sinajana
Guatemala	María Lucrecia Flores Flores	24	Guatemala City
(Netherlands) Holland	Hilda van der Meulen	22	Oudeschoot
Honduras	Tania Brüchmann Escoria	18	Tegucigalpa
(British Hong Kong) Hong Kong	May Lam Lai-mei	20	Hong Kong
Iceland	Guðrún Rut Hreiðarsdóttir	19	Reykjavík
India	Karminder Kaur-Virk	20	Chandigarh
(Republic of Ireland) Ireland	Pamela Flood	22	Dublin
Israel	Tamara Porat	18	Tel Aviv
Italy	Barbara Chiappini	18	Piacenza
Jamaica	Lisa Rene Shanti Hanna	18	Kingston
Japan	Yoko Miyasaka	22	Tokyo
Latvia	Sigita Rude	19	Liepāja
Lebanon	Ghada El Turk	21	Keserwan
Lithuania	Jurate Mikutaitė	21	Kaunas
Macau	Isabela Pedruco	20	Macau
Malaysia	Jacqueline Ngu	23	Kuala Lumpur
Malta	Susanne-Mary Borg	17	Mosta
Mauritius	Viveka Babajee †	20	Beau Bassin
Mexico	Elizabeth Margain Rivera	22	Mexico City
Namibia	Christalene Barbara Kahatjipara	20	Windhoek
New Zealand	Nicola Johanna Brighty	20	Auckland
Nigeria	Helen Ntukidem	22	Lagos
Norway	Rita Omvik	21	Kongsvinger
Panama	Aracelys del Carmen Cogley Prestán	23	Colón
Paraguay	Claudia Liz Florentín Fariña	19	Asunción
Philippines	Sharmaine “Ruffa” Rama Gutierrez	19	Manila
Poland	Aleksandra Spieczyńska	19	Wrocław
Portugal	Ana Luísa Barbosa Moreira	20	Porto
Puerto Rico	Ana Rosa Brito Suárez	23	San Juan
Russia	Olga Syssoeva	19	Moscow
Singapore	Desiree Chan Fam Yin	20	Singapore
Slovakia	Dana Vojtechovská	20	Košice
Slovenia	Metka Albreht	18	Postojna
South Africa	Palesa Jacqueline Mofokeng †	21	Soweto
South Korea (Note: Competed as Korea in the pageant)	Lee Seung-yeon	24	Seoul
Spain	Araceli García Eugenio	23	Madrid
Sri Lanka	Chamila Wickremesinghe	22	Colombo
(Eswatini) Swaziland	Sharon Richards	20	Mbabane
Sweden	Karin Victoria Silvstedt	19	Bollnäs
Switzerland	Patricia Fässler	19	Zürich
Taiwan (Note: Also known as the Republic of China.)	Virginia Long Wei-yen	19	Taipei
Thailand	Maturose “Sherry” Kato Leaudsakda	18	Bangkok
Trinidad and Tobago	Denyse Michelle Paul	23	San Fernando
Turkey	Emel Yıldırım	19	Istanbul
Uganda	Linda Bazalaki	20	Kampala
United Kingdom	Amanda Louise Johnson	19	Nottingham
United States	Maribeth Brown	23	Holliston
United States Virgin Islands (Note: competed as American Virgin Islands)	Suzanne Palermo	21	St. Thomas
Uruguay	María Fernanda Navarro Guigou	20	Montevideo
Venezuela	Mónica Lei Scaccia	22	Caracas
Zimbabwe	Karen Amanda Stally	19	Harare

== Notes ==
=== Did not compete ===
- Botswana – Mpho Lekoko - Due Lack of Time..
- French Polynesia – Heikapua Thérèse Moke
- Peru – Mónika Sáez Grimm - Due lack of sponsor.

=== Replacements ===
- Slovakia – The winner of last Miss Czechoslovakia 1993 pageant, Silvia Lakatošová from Slovakia supossed to participate there, but was remplaced by undisclosed reazons by a runner up - Dana Vojtechovska also from Slovakia.
- Turkey – The winner of Miss Turkey 1993, Arzum Onan was supposed to participate at Miss World 1993, however she won Miss Europe 1993 in June making her unable to compete after and remplaced by her runner up - Emel Yildirim.

=== Other Notes ===
- France - Véronique de la Cruz, a semi-finalist at this year’s Miss World, was unplaced at Miss Universe 1993 pageant in Mexico City just 6 months earlier.
