= Miss Perú 1989 =

- Date: April 16, 1989
- Presenters: Gonzalo Iwasaki, Katia Crovetti
- Venue: Coliseo Amauta
- Broadcaster: Panamericana Televisión
- Entrants: 16
- Winner: Mariana Sovero McKay; Distrito Capital

The Miss Perú 1989 pageant was held on April 16, 1989. That year, 16 candidates were competing for the national crown. The chosen winner represented Peru at the Miss Universe 1989 and Miss World 1989. The rest of the finalists would enter in different pageants.

== Placements ==
Final Results	Contestant
Miss Peru Universe 1989	Distrito Capital – Mariana Sovero McKay
Miss World Peru 1989	Region Lima - Maritza Zorrilla Priori
1st Runner-Up	Cajamarca - Mariela Bisval
2nd Runner-Up	Ancash - Macarena Leguía
3rd Runner-Up	Cuzco - Carmen Abad-Schuster
Top 10	Lambayeque - Clara Luisa Reátegui Cipriani; Ucayali - Tessy Torres Palacios; Tumbes - Guiselle García; Piura - Mariloli Pita; Amazonas - Ana Rosa Vick

== Special awards ==
- Best Regional Costume - Puno - Ana María Carrasco Palomo
- Miss Photogenic - Region Lima - Maritza Zorrilla
- Miss Elegance - Cuzco - Carmen Abad-Schuster
- Miss Body - Ancash - Macarena Leguía
- Best Hair - Distrito Capital – Mariana Sovero
- Miss Congeniality - Ucayali - Tessy Torres Palacios
- Most Beautiful Face - Amazonas - Ana Rosa Vick

.

== Delegates ==
- Amazonas - Ana Rosa Vick
- Ancash - Macarena Leguía
- Arequipa - Francoise Rodríguez
- Cajamarca - Mariela Bisval
- Callao - Ximena Fernald
- Cuzco - Carmen Abad-Schuster
- Distrito Capital - Mariana Sovero McKay
- Ica - Patricia Burgos
- La Libertad - Yvonne Vera
- Lambayeque - Clara Luisa Reátegui Cipriani
- Piura - Mariloli Pita
- Puno - Ana María Carrasco Palomo
- Region Lima - Maritza Zorrilla
- Tacna - Gladys Rivera
- Tumbes - Guiselle García
- Ucayali - Tessy Torres Palacios

.

== Background Music ==
- Swimsuit Competition – Spyro Gyra — Soho Mojo
- Evening Gown Competition – Orlando Netti -Te Voy A Contar Un Secreto

.
