= Linda Pétursdóttir =

Icelandic businesswoman and beauty queen

Linda Pétursdóttir (born 27 December 1969) is an Icelandic businesswoman and beauty queen who won Miss World 1988.

Linda was born in Húsavík and raised there and in Vopnafjörður. She won Miss Iceland on 23 May 1988 and Miss World that November. She was the second Icelandic woman to win the Miss World title after Hólmfríður Karlsdóttir won it on 1985. She was preceded and succeeded by European delegates, as the 1987 titleholder was Ulla Weigerstorfer from Austria who crowned her. And she crowned Aneta Kręglicka of Poland, at Miss World 1989. She won after Hólmfríður Karlsdóttir in 1985 and before Unnur Birna Vilhjálmsdóttir in 2005.

She operated a spa company named Baðhúsið for over 20 years, which closed in 2014. In 2003, with Reynir Traustason, she published her autobiography, Linda - ljós & skuggar.

In 2015, she was guest judge in the final Miss World 2015 beauty pageant in Sanya, Hainan, China PR.

In 2019, Pétursdóttir became the license holder for Miss World Iceland.

Awards and achievements
| Preceded by (Austria) Ulla Weigerstorfer | Miss World; 1988 | Succeeded by (Poland) Aneta Kręglicka |
| Preceded by (Austria) Ulla Weigerstorfer | Miss World Europe; 1988 | Succeeded by (Poland) Aneta Kręglicka |
| Preceded by Anna Margrét Jónsdóttir | Ungfrú Ísland; 1988 | Succeeded by Hugrún Linda Guðmundsdóttir |
