= Hólmfríður Karlsdóttir =

Icelandic model

- Born: Hólmfríður Karlsdóttir; 3 June 1963 (age 63); Reykjavík, Iceland
- Height: 1.73 m (5 ft 8 in)
- Beauty pageant titleholder
- Title: Miss World Iceland; Miss World 1985
- Hair color: Blonde
- Eye color: Blue
- Major competitions: Ungfrú Ísland 1985 (Runner-up); Miss World 1985 (Winner) (Miss World Europe)

Hólmfríður "Hófí" Karlsdóttir (born 3 June 1963) is an Icelandic former model and beauty queen who won the 1985 Miss World contest.

She was the first Icelandic contestant to won the Miss World title, although later she was followed by Linda Pétursdóttir in 1988, and the recent Icelandic winner: Unnur Birna Vilhjálmsdóttir in 2005.

== Miss World ==
Hólmfríður finished runner-up at the 1985 Miss Iceland contest behind Halla Jonsdóttir. Halla went to Miss Universe while Hólmfríður won the title of Miss World Iceland and represented Iceland at Miss World, where she was named Europe's Queen of Beauty and Miss World 1985, her first runner-up was Mandy Shires from the United Kingdom and her second runner-up was Brenda Denton from the United States. She also won the Miss World Europe title. She passed her crown to Giselle Laronde of Trinidad and Tobago, at the 1986 Miss World pageant.

== Life after Miss World ==
Hólmfríður is married to Elfar Rúnarsson and they have three children together, Anton Örn Elfarsson ('89), Rúnar Karl Elfarsson ('91) and Ásta Gígja Elfarsdóttir ('97). The family lives in Iceland, Garðabær, where Hófí works in a local kindergarten and Elfar works nearby as a lawyer.

Awards and achievements
Preceded by (Venezuela) Astrid Carolina Herrera	Miss World; 1985	Succeeded by (Trinidad and Tobago) Giselle Laronde
Preceded by (United Kingdom) Vivienne Rooke	Miss World Europe; 1985	Succeeded by (Denmark) Pia Rosenberg Larsen
Preceded by Berglind Johansen	Miss Iceland; 1985	Succeeded by Gígja Birgisdóttir
