= Aneta Kręglicka =

Polish dancer and beauty queen (born 1965)

- Born: Aneta Beata Kręglicka; 23 March 1965 (age 61); Szczecin, Poland
- Height: 173 cm (68 in)
- Beauty pageant titleholder
- Title: Miss Polonia 1989; Miss World 1989
- Hair color: Blonde
- Eye color: Blue
- Major competitions: Miss Polonia 1989 (Winner); Miss International 1989 (1st Runner-Up); Miss World 1989 (Winner)

Aneta Beata Kręglicka (born 23 March 1965) is a Polish dancer and beauty queen who won the Miss World 1989 contest on 22 November 1989 in Hong Kong, representing Poland. She became the first woman from Poland to win the title and the oldest titleholder when she was crowned on 22 November 1989, at the age of 24 years, 244 days. The next Pole to win said pageant was Karolina Bielawska in 2021.

== Early life ==
She was born in Szczecin. She studied economics at Gdańsk University and began graduate studies at SGH Warsaw School of Economics in Poland. She was a member of the contemporary dance group at Gdańsk University before entering the Miss Poland pageant.

== Miss World ==
In July 1989, she was crowned as Miss Polonia 1989. In September she traveled to Japan to represent her country at Miss International 1989, almost winning the crown for Poland, becoming the first runner-up to Iris Klein of Germany.

After this experience, she had to prepare immediately for Miss World, held in Hong Kong, and on 22 November 1989 won the title of Miss World 1989. For a year she traveled the world, fulfilling her obligations and helping the Miss World Organization with their charitable causes. She eventually crowned Gina Tolleson of the United States, at the 1990 Miss World pageant held in the London Palladium, London, United Kingdom on 8 November 1990.

== Life after Miss World ==
In 2006, she took part in the third season of the Polish version of Dancing With The Stars. She was also one of the judges at Miss World 2006, held in Poland that year.

She has one son, Aleksander, with her husband, director Maciej Żak.

Awards and achievements
Preceded by (Iceland) Linda Pétursdóttir	Miss World; 1989	Succeeded by (United States) Gina Marie Tolleson
Preceded by (Iceland) Linda Pétursdóttir	Miss World Europe; 1989	Succeeded by (Republic of Ireland) Siobhan McClafferty
Preceded by Joanna Gapińska	Miss Polonia; 1989	Succeeded by Joanna Michalska
Preceded by Joanna Gapińska	Miss Polonia World; 1989	Succeeded by Ewa Maria Szymczak
Vacant	Miss Polonia International; 1989	Succeeded by Ewa Maria Szymczak
