= Ché Greenidge =

Environmental activist and model from Barbados

Ché Greenidge is a model and environmental activist from Barbados. She was crowned Miss World Barbados on 31 August 2019. As part of her campaign, she wanted to raise awareness of deaf rights, and as a result learnt American sign language. She had previously competed in Miss Universe Barbados in 2017, but missed the final due to a broken foot. She competed in the 2019 Miss World beauty pageant, but was unplaced in the contest.

She studied at the University of the West Indies for a BA in Political Science and International Relations. As of 2022 she was executive director of Barbados Environmental Conservation Trust.
