= Miss World Guam =

Beauty pageant

- Formation: 2011
- Type: Beauty pageant
- Headquarters: Hagåtña
- Location: Guam
- Members: Miss World
- Official language: English
- Website: Official website

Miss World Guam is a national pageant that sends representatives to Miss World Pageant.

== History ==
Miss World Guam was founded in 2011. A separate pageant was launched in 2011 to focus on Miss World only and not other international pageants. On occasion, when the winner does not qualify (due to age) for either contest, a runner-up is sent.

Guam was debuted at Miss World in 1971 and represented by Deborah Bordallo Nelson, who placed as the 4th Runner-up. Guam won the crown after the official winner of Miss World 1980, Gabriella Brum, resigned the title. Kimberley Santos became the new Miss World 1980 from Guam.

== Titleholders ==
Color key

- Declared as Winner
- Ended as runner-up
- Ended as one of the finalists or semifinalists

Year	Miss World Guam	Placement	Special Awards
1971	Deborah Bordallo Nelson	Top 15	
1972	Maria Louise "Marylou" Pangelinan	Top 15	
1973	Shirley Ann Brennan	Unplaced	
1974	Rosemary Laguna Pablo	Unplaced	
1975	Dora Ann Quintanilla Camacho	Unplaced	
1976	Diane Marie Roberts Duenas	2nd Runner-up	
1977	Diane Haun	Unplaced	
1978	Elizabeth Clara Tenorio	Unplaced	
1979	Anne-Marie Kay Franke	Unplaced	
1980	Kimberly Santos	Miss World 1980	
1981	Rebecca Arroyo	Unplaced	
1982	Frances Rose Limtiaco	Top 15	
1983	Geraldine Santos	Unplaced	
1984	Janet Rachelle Clymer	Unplaced	
1985	Therese M. Quintanilla	Unplaced	
1986	Valerie Jean Flores	Unplaced	
1987	Francel Maribel Manibog Caracol	Top 12	Queen of Oceania
1988	Rita Mae Pangelinan	Unplaced	
1989	Cora Taitano Yanger	Unplaced	
1990	Mary Esteban	Unplaced	
1991	Yvonne Marie Limtiaco Speight	Unplaced	
1992	Michelle Cruz	Unplaced	
1993	Gina Burkhart	Unplaced	
1994	Chalorna Freitas	Unplaced	
1995	Joylyn Muñoz	Unplaced	
1996	Aileen Maravilla Villanueva	Unplaced	
2011	Siera Monique Robertson	Unplaced	
2012	Jeneva Bosko	Top 30	
2013	Camarin Maria Mendiola Leon	Unplaced	
2014	Chanel Victoria Cruz Jarrett	Unplaced	
2015	Aria Perez Theisen	Unplaced	Miss World Sport (2nd Runner-up)
2016	Phoebe Denight Palisoc	Unplaced	
2017	Destiny Cruz	Unplaced	Miss World Talent (Top 20)
2018	Gianna Sgambelluri	Unplaced	
