= Miss World Bermuda =

- Formation: 1971
- Founder: Milika Trott-Seymour
- Type: Beauty pageant
- Headquarters: Hamilton
- Location: Bermuda
- Members: Miss World
- Official language: English
- Website: www.missbermuda.bm

Miss World Bermuda is the national franchise of the Miss World pageant in the British Overseas Territory of Bermuda. Although Bermuda is under the jurisdiction of the United Kingdom, it still has its own contestant, very similar to many of the other BOTs.

== Titleholders ==
Color key

- Declared as Miss World
- Ended as runner-up
- Ended as one of the finalists or semifinalists in Miss World

Year	Miss World Bermuda	Placement	Special award(s)	Ref
1971	Rene Furbert	Unplaced		
1972	Helen Brown	Unplaced		
1973	Judy Joy Richards	Unplaced		
1974	Joyce Ann de Rosa	Unplaced		
1975	Donna Louise Wright	Unplaced		
1976	Vivienne Ann Hollis	Unplaced		
1977	Connie Marie Firth	Unplaced		
1978	Madeline Francine Joell	Unplaced		
1979	Gina Swainson	Miss World 1979		
1980	Zina Maria Minks	Top 15		
1981	Cymone Florie Tucker	Unplaced		
1982	Heather Michelle Ross	Unplaced		
1983	Angelita Emily Diaz	Unplaced		
1984	Rhonda Cherylene Wilkinson	Unplaced		
1985	Jannell Kathy Nadra Ford	Unplaced		
1986	Samantha Jayne Morton	Unplaced		
1987	Kim Elizabeth Johnston	Unplaced		
1988	Sophie Cannonier	Unplaced		
1989	Cherie Tannock	Unplaced		
1992	Dianne Lorraine Mitchell	Unplaced		
1993	Kellie Hall	Unplaced		
1995	Renita Minors	Unplaced		
2011	Jana Lynn Outerbridge	Unplaced		
2012	Rochelle Minors	Unplaced	Multimedia Award (Top 10)	
2013	Katherine Arnfield	Unplaced		
2014	Lillian Lightbourn	Unplaced		
2015	Alyssa Rose	Unplaced	Miss World Talent (Top 14)	
