= Barbara Chiappini =

Italian model, showgirl and actress

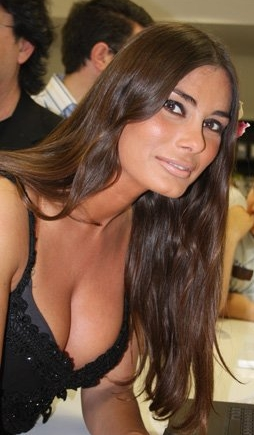
- Born: 2 November 1974 (age 51); Piacenza, Italy
- Occupations: Showgirl, model, television personality and actress
- Years active: 1992 – present
- Height: 178 cm (5 ft 10 in)
- Spouse: Carlo Marini Agostini
- Children: Sveva Lucia; Folco

Barbara Chiappini (born 2 November 1974) is an Italian actress, model and beauty pageant titleholder who was crowned Miss World Italy 1993 and represented her country at Miss World 1993.

== Life and career ==
Born in Piacenza, Chiappini studied violin for four years at the conservatory of her city. In 1993 she won the beauty contest "An Italian for Miss World" and she subsequently entered the Miss World competition, winning the title of "Miss Photogenic". The same year, she made her television debut as a regular in the variety show Buona Domenica. She was active on fotoromanzi and appeared in three sexy calendars in 2002, 2003 and 2004. She participated in the soap opera Un posto al sole and the first edition of the Raidue reality show L'Isola dei Famosi. She is also active in films, TV series, and on stage.
