= Miss Liberia =

Beauty pageant

Miss Liberia Organization
- Formation: 1962
- Type: Beauty pageant
- Headquarters: Monrovia
- Location: Liberia
- Members: Miss World; Miss International
- Official language: English
- Committee: Ministry of Information, Culture and Tourism (MICAT)

Miss Liberia is a national beauty pageant in Liberia.

== History ==
Miss Liberia pageant was held for first time in 1962. The pageant is sponsored by Ministry of Information, Culture and Tourism (MICAT). Traditionally, the winner will represent Liberia at Miss World pageant. In 1974 - 1977 the winner represented the country at Miss Universe pageant. This pageant is unrelated to Miss Liberia U.S.A pageant.

== Organizers ==
In 2012 Cellcom GSM Company has promised to sponsor the communication aspect of this year's Miss Liberia Beauty Pageant expected to be hosted by CT. Com Liberia Incorporated. The organizers of the pageant have budgeted a little over US$98,000 for the program. Cellcom has promised to contribute US$22,000 to the budget for publicity. The GSM Company says it believes in the improvement of any Liberian, who believes in achieving results for the benefit of all Liberians. After absent at the beauty contest, Miss Liberia is back in 2014. The Steering Committee of the Miss Liberia Beauty Pageant has announced 11 stripes Incorporated as the company to organize the prestigious Miss Liberia 2013/2014 beauty pageant in Monrovia.

== Titleholders ==
Year	Miss Liberia
1962	Agnes Elizabeth Anderson
1963	Ethel Zoe Norman
1964	Norma Dorothy Davis
1965	Melvilla Mardea Harris
1968	Wilhelmina Nadieh Brownell
1969	Antionette Coleman
1970	Florence Mamusu Wiles
1972	Cecelia Armena King
1974	Maria Yatta Johnson
1975	Aurelia Sancho
1976	Laurine Wede Johnson
1977	Welma Albertine Wani Campbell
1983	Annie Broderick
1985	Sarah Laurine Massanuh Horton
1988	Ollie White
1995	Sara Elizabeth Buchanan
1997	Joyce Jefferlyn Johnson
1998	Olivia Precious Cooper
1999	Sebah Esther Tubman
2005	Snoti Muna Forh
2006	Patrice Daiemoe Juah
2007	Bendu Tita Parker
2009	Shu-Rina Rosie Wiah
2010	Meenakshi Monica Subramani
2012	Leda Knowlden
2017	Wokie Dolo
2022	Veralyn Vonleh

== Liberia at International pageants ==
=== Miss Universe Liberia ===
- : Declared as Winner
- : Ended as runner-up or top 5/6 qualification
- : Ended as one of the finalists or semifinalists
- : Ended as special awards winner

Year	Miss Universe Liberia	Placement at Miss Universe	Special Award(s)
Did not compete since 1978—present
1977	Welma Albertine Wani Campbell	Unplaced	
1976	Laurine Wede Johnson	Unplaced	
1975	Aurelia Sancho	Unplaced	
1974	Maria Yatta Johnson	Unplaced	

=== Miss World Liberia ===
- : Declared as Winner
- : Ended as runner-up or top 5/6 qualification
- : Ended as one of the finalists or semifinalists
- : Ended as special awards winner

Year	Miss World Liberia	Placement at Miss World	Special Award(s)
Did not compete between 2025—present
2024	Veralyn Vonleh	Unplaced	
Did not compete between 2018—2022
2017	Wokie Dolo	Top 40	Head-to-Head Challenge Winner
Did not compete between 2012—2016
2011	Meenakshi Monica Subramani	Unplaced	
2010	Did not compete		
2009	Shu-Rina Rosie Wiah	Unplaced	
Did not compete between 2007—2008
2006	Patrice Daiemole Juah	Unplaced	
2005	Snoti Muna Forh	Unplaced	
Did not compete between 2000—2004
1999	Sebah Esther Tubman	Top 5	
1998	Olivia Precious Cooper	Unplaced	
Did not compete between 1989—1997
1988	Ollie White	Unplaced	
Did not compete between 1986—1987
1985	Sarah Laurine Massanuh Horton	Unplaced	
1984	Did not compete		
1983	Annie Broderick	Unplaced	Miss World Africa
Did not compete between 1973—1982
1972	Cecelia Armena King	Unplaced	
1971	Did not compete		
1970	Mainusa Wiles	Unplaced	
1969	Antionette Coleman	Unplaced	
1968	Wilhelmina Nadieh Brownell	Unplaced	
Did not compete between 1966—1967
1965	Melvilla Mardea Harris	Unplaced	
1964	Norma Dorothy Davis	Top 16	
1963	Ethel Zoe Norman	Top 15	

=== Miss International Liberia ===
- : Declared as Winner
- : Ended as runner-up or top 5/6 qualification
- : Ended as one of the finalists or semifinalists
- : Ended as special awards winner

Year	Miss Liberia International	Placement at Miss International	Special Award(s)
2025	Precious Lemu Flomo	Unplaced	
2024	Kindness Wilson	Unplaced	
Did not compete since 2022—2023
Due to the impact of COVID-19 pandemic, no pageant between 2020 and 2021
2019	Naomi Nucia Glay	Unplaced	Miss International Africa
Did not compete between 2009—2018
2008	Telena Casell	Unplaced	
2007	Harriette Thomas	Unplaced	
2006	Bendu Ciapha	Did not compete	
Did not compete between 1965—2005
1964	Norma Dorothy Davis	Unplaced	
1963	Did not compete		
1962	Agnes Elizabeth Anderson	Unplaced	
