= Miss Macau =

Beauty pageant

Miss Macau Pageant 澳門小姐競選
- Formation: 1972
- Type: Beauty pageant
- Headquarters: Macau
- Location: Macau
- Members: Miss Universe; Miss World; Miss International
- Official language: Chinese
- Organization: Macau Pageant Alliance - 澳門選美連盟; Kimmy Low ― Miss Universe Macau Organization
- Website: Miss Macau

Miss Macau (Chinese: 澳門小姐競選) is a beauty pageant in Macau, first held in 1972.

The reigning Miss Macau is Kristen feng, winner of the 2025 pageant.

== History ==
Miss Macau was held for the first time in 1972 and the program was sponsored by the Sociedade de Turismo e Diversões de Macau (STDM). In 1972, Miss Macau was allowed to represent Macau at the Miss Portugal pageant. Previously, Macau was a province from 1897 to 1976 and later the autonomous region of Macau in Portugal from 1976 to 1999. In 1972, Miss Macau won the Miss Congeniality award at the Miss Portugal competition. Between 1985 and 1998 the Miss Macau pageant was organized by TDM - Teledifusão de Macau.

=== Miss Macau 1963 ===
A Macau beauty queen identified in 1963, she is Ying Yun Hiu. She competed at Miss Asia in April 1963 in Tokyo, Japan, and named as the first Macau beauty queen who competed internationally. She also scheduled to compete at Miss Universe 1963 but enabled to compete since Macau politically between 1897 and 1976 was a province of Portugal.

=== Macau Pageant Alliance ===
In 2009, the MPA or Macau Pageant Alliance held for the first time. The alliance is officially franchise holder for Miss World and Miss International.

=== Miss Universe Macau ===
Beginning in 2024, the Miss Universe Organization allowed all the territories to compete in the Miss Universe pageant. The Miss Universe Macau is under Kimmy Low and sponsored by Zetrix, a Layer-1 interoperable blockchain designed to support real-world use cases among public sectors, enterprises, and financial institutions from Singapore. The Miss Universe Macau is unrelated to the Miss Macau organized by the Macau Pageant Alliance.

== Titleholders ==
=== Miss Macau 1972 ===
Year	Miss Macau	First Runner-up	Second Runner-up	Third Runner-up	Fourth Runner-up
1972	Anabela Oliveira da Costa	那打利拜華	伊利沙白亞馬留	戴安娜	花地瑪啤啤

=== Miss Macau 1985―2019 ===
Year	Miss Macau	First Runner-up	Second Runner-up
1985	Wong Yuk Sim	Carolina Maria Lopes	Marina da Rocha Lopes
1986	Patricia Cheong Sai	Angela Tsang	劉少英
1987	Olivia Ana Maria do Rosário	呂靜紅	溫雪梅
1988	Helena da Conceição Lo Branco	周維娜	Vera Chao
1989	Guilhermina "Mina" Madeira da Silva Pedruco	Leong Mei Chan	Lily Lei Lei Lei
1990	Alexandra Paula Costa Mendes	Micaela Mendes	黃月媚
1991	Cristina Guilherme Lam	梁穎詩	―
1992	Ho Lok I	Lucia Abrantes Santos	Io Weng San
1993	Isabela Madeira da Silva Pedruco	Lisa dos Santos Lewis	Balia Chan
1994	Chen Ji Min	Daniela Maria Costa Mendes	Lao Hio
1995	Geraldina Madeira da Silva Pedruco	Fon Io-In	Helena Isabel Dillar Fernandes
1996	Guiomar Madeira da Silva Pedruco	Lei Fei	Kimberley Chiu Nga Ling
1997	Agnes Lo Vai Van	Regina Gageiro Madeira	Ivy Cheong Weng Mui
2008	Florence Loi	Ana Kuan Barroso	Cherry Ng
2009	Laura Li	Sarah Leyshan	Joyce Huang
2019	Bobo Leong	Emily Yau	Dinelle Wong

=== Miss Universe Macau 2024–present ===
Year	Date	Miss Universe Macau	First Runner-up	Second Runner-up
2024	September 24, 2024	Cassandra Chiu	There were no runners-up	
2025	October 23, 2025	Kristen Feng	There were no runners-up	
2026	September 2026			

== International competition ==
=== Miss Universe Macau ===
- : Declared as Winner
- : Ended as runner-up or top 5/6 qualification
- : Ended as one of the finalists or semifinalists
- : Ended as special awards winner

Year	Representative	Title	Placement	Special Awards
Kimmy Low directorship — a franchise holder to Miss Universe from 2024
2024	Cassandra Chiu	Miss Universe Macau 2024	Top 30	
2025	Kristen Feng	Miss Universe Macau 2025	Unplaced	
2026	Xuhe Hou	Miss Universe Macau 2026	TBA	

=== Miss World Macau ===
- : Declared as Winner
- : Ended as runner-up or top 5/6 qualification
- : Ended as one of the finalists or semifinalists
- : Ended as special awards winner

Year	Representative	Title	Placement	Special Awards
1986	Sai Cheong	Miss Macau 1986	Unplaced	
1987	Olívia Maria do Rosário	Miss Macau 1987	Unplaced	
1988	Helena de Conceição Lo Branco	Miss Macau 1988	Unplaced	
1989	Guilhermina Madeira da Silva Pedruco	Miss Macau 1989	Unplaced	
1990	Alexandra Paula Costa Mendes	Miss Macau 1990	Unplaced	
1991	Cristina Guilherme Lam	Miss Macau 1991	Unplaced	
1992	Ho Lok-I	Miss Macau 1992	Unplaced	
1993	Isabella Madeira da Silva Pedruco	Miss Macau 1993	Unplaced	
1994	Chen Ji-Min	Miss Macau 1994	Unplaced	
1995	Geraldina Madeira da Silva Pedruco	Miss Macau 1995	Unplaced	
1996	Guiomar Madeira da Silva Pedruco	Miss Macau 1996	Unplaced	
1997	Agnes Lo	Miss Macau 1997	Unplaced	
Did not compete between 1998—2009
2010	Cherry Ng Ka-I	Miss Macau 2008; Second Runner-up	Unplaced	
Did not compete in 2011
2012	Winnie Sin	Miss Macau 2009; Top 6	Unplaced	Sports and Fitness (Top 24); Performing Talent (Top 16)
Did not compete between 2013—2016
2017	Wan Ling-Lan	Miss World Macau 2017	Top 15	Head-to-Head Challenge Winner (Group 7)
Did not compete in 2018
2019	Yu Yanan	Miss World Macau 2019	Unplaced	Miss World Top Model (Top 40)
2021	Jia Ni Yuan	Miss World Macau 2021	Unplaced	
2023	Li Mengli	Miss World Macau 2022	Unplaced	
2025	Li Mengli	Miss World Macau 2025	TBA	

=== Miss International Macau ===
- : Declared as Winner
- : Ended as runner-up or top 5/6 qualification
- : Ended as one of the finalists or semifinalists
- : Ended as special awards winner

Year	Representative	Title	Placement	Special Awards
2005	Ma Zheng	Miss International Macau 2005	Unplaced	
Did not compete between 2006—2007
2008	Florence Loi	Miss Macau 2008	Unplaced	
2009	Yvonne Yang	Miss Macau 2009; Contestant	Unplaced	
2010	Mandy Ye	Miss Macau 2009; Contestant	Unplaced	
2011	Winnie Sin	Miss Macau 2009; Top 6	Unplaced	
2012	Cherry Ng	Miss Macau 2008; Second Runner-up	Unplaced	
2013	Adela Sou Ka-Wai	Miss International Macau 2013	Unplaced	Miss Internet
2014	Chan Hio-Man	Miss International Macau 2014	Unplaced	
2015	Ana Choi	Miss International Macau 2015	Unplaced	
2016	Sulin Ip	Miss International Macau 2016	Unplaced	
2017	Sofia Paiva	Miss International Macau 2017	Unplaced	
2018	Cherry Chin	Miss International Macau 2018	Unplaced	
2019	Bobo Leong	Miss Macau 2019	Unplaced	Miss Photogenic (Top 10)
Due to the impact of COVID-19 pandemic, no pageant in 2020 and 2021
2022	Dinelle Wong	Miss Macau 2019; Second Runner-up	Unplaced	
2023	Emily Yau	Miss Macau 2019; First Runner-up	Unplaced	Miss International Asia Pacific
2024	Shirley Zhou	Miss International Macau 2024	Unplaced	

=== Miss Earth Macau ===
- : Declared as Winner
- : Ended as runner-up or top 5/6 qualification
- : Ended as one of the finalists or semifinalists
- : Ended as special awards winner

Year	Representative	Title	Placement	Special Awards
2025	Evangeline Chen	Miss Earth Macau 2025	Top 25	
