= Yasna Vukasovic =

Yasna Angélica Vukasovic Álvarez (born c. 1969) is a Chilean beauty pageant titleholder who was delegate for Miss World 1987. She comes from Punta Arenas, Chile and is of Croat origin. She has 3 daughters, 1 son and one grandson (Vicente). Yasna currently lives in Santiago, and among her various activities she is a certified PNL coach, producer and insurance agent.

Awards and achievements
Preceded by Margot Elena Fuenzalida	Miss World Chile; 1987	Succeeded by María Francisca Aldunate
