= Gina Tolleson =

American model and beauty queen (born 1969)

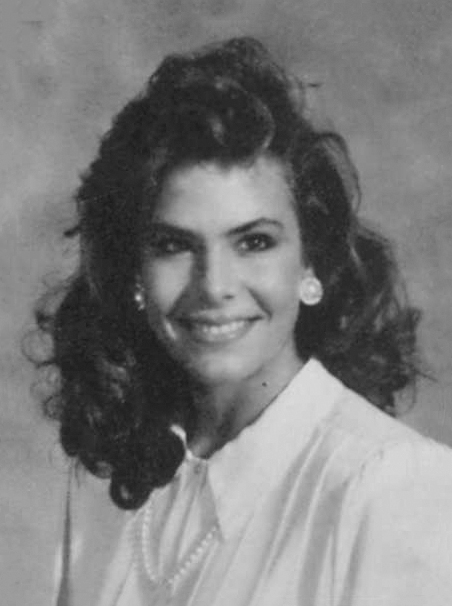
- Tolleson on her 1987 high school senior yearbook
- Born: Gina Marie Tolleson; March 26, 1969 (age 57); Spartanburg, South Carolina, U.S.
- Spouses: Alan Thicke (m. 1994; div. 1999): Christian Wiesenthal
- Children: 3
- Beauty pageant titleholder
- Title: Miss South Carolina USA 1990; Miss World America 1990; Miss World 1990
- Hair color: Brown
- Eye color: Hazel
- Major competitions: Miss USA 1990 (1st runner-up); Miss World 1990 (Winner) (Miss World Americas)

Gina Marie Tolleson (born March 26, 1969) is an American model and beauty queen who was crowned Miss World America 1990 and also Miss World 1990. She was the second American to win the Miss World title, after Marjorie Wallace in 1973.

== Miss World 1990 ==
Gina won the title of Miss South Carolina USA 1990 and was the first runner-up at Miss USA 1990. She went on to win the Miss World beauty pageant in 1990, representing the United States. Gina was coached by C.B. Mathis of CB's Limited in Lancaster, SC. During her reign, she traveled to over twenty countries including United Kingdom, Germany, Canada, Dominican Republic, South Africa, Poland, Belize, El Salvador, Guatemala and throughout the United States.

== Personal life ==
Gina married the late Canadian-American actor Alan Thicke (Growing Pains) on August 13, 1994, and divorced him on September 29, 1999. She has a son with Thicke named Carter William. She has two other children born 2005 and 2006, with her second husband Christian Wiesenthal.

Awards and achievements
Preceded by (Poland) Aneta Beata Kręglicka	Miss World; 1990	Succeeded by (Venezuela) Ninibeth Beatriz Leal
Preceded by (Canada) Leanne Caputo	Miss World Americas; 1990	Succeeded by (Venezuela) Ninibeth Leal
Preceded by Jill Scheffert (Oklahoma)	Miss World USA; 1990	Succeeded by Charlotte Ray (New Jersey)
