= Ulla Weigerstorfer =

Austrian TV host, model and beauty queen (born 1967)

- Born: Ulrike Weigerstorfer; 16 August 1967 (age 59); Bad Aussee, Austria
- Children: 1
- Beauty pageant titleholder
- Title: Miss World 1987
- Hair color: Blond

Ulla Weigerstorfer (born Ulrike Weigerstorfer 16 August 1967 in Bad Aussee) is an Austrian TV host, model and beauty queen who won Miss World 1987 in London representing Austria. She became the second titleholder from her country, after Eva Rueber-Staier of Austria in 1969.

== Life after Miss World ==
Ulla has appeared on various TV shows, presented a sports programme on radio and written two books about cosmetics. She has also undertaken work in the fast food industry and is involved in charity work.

In her free time she enjoys show jumping with her own horses.

In the 2013 Austrian parliamentary election Weigerstorfer ran for the Team Stronach. Following the resignation of Monika Lindner on November 27, she became her successor in the National Council (Nationalrat).

Awards and achievements
Preceded by (Trinidad and Tobago) Giselle Laronde	Miss World; 1987	Succeeded by (Iceland) Linda Pétursdóttir
Preceded by (Denmark) Pia Rosenberg Larsen	Miss World Europe; 1987	Succeeded by (Iceland) Linda Pétursdóttir
