= Giselle Laronde =

Trinidadian model and beauty queen (born 1963)

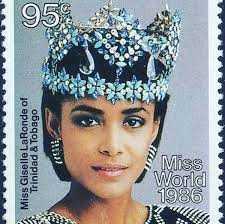
- Born: Giselle Jeanne-Marie Laronde; 23 October 1963 (age 62); Port of Spain, Trinidad and Tobago
- Other names: Giselle Laronde-West; Giselle Laronde
- Height: 1.65 m (5 ft 5 in)
- Beauty pageant titleholder
- Title: Miss Trinidad and Tobago World 1986; Miss World 1986
- Hair color: Black
- Eye color: Brown
- Major competitions: Miss Trinidad and Tobago; 1986 (Winner); Miss World 1986 (Winner) (Miss World Americas)

Giselle Jeanne-Marie Laronde-West (born October 23, 1963) is a Trinidadian model, stenographer and beauty queen who won Miss World 1986, representing Trinidad and Tobago. She became the second woman from that nation to win an international beauty pageant, after Janelle Commissiong (Miss Universe 1977), and the only one to date, to win the Miss World title. The pageant was held in London, UK at the Royal Albert Hall on November 13, 1986. She was preceded and succeeded by European delegates at Miss World .

== Early life ==
Giselle was born in Port-of-Spain, Trinidad. She grew up in several parts of Trinidad but spent most of her life in San Fernando where she moved to, with her family at the age of 10. One of four children, she attended St. Peter's school at Pointe-à-Pierre and St. Francois Girls High School. In her early 20s, while Giselle was working at a local credit union, many of her friends and family encouraged her to enter the Miss World contest because they said she looked the part and had the personality. Giselle considered herself as good-looking, but not as exceptionally gorgeous. She also considered herself a "tom-boy"; "never glamorous, never ever a girly-girl or getting her nails and hair done..." Following her family's prodding, she attended the Miss World auditions held in the nation's capital, Port-of-Spain, on what was the last day to be eligible for the contest. Laronde thought that the factors that led her to victory included a combination of self-assurance, beauty, personality, and grace. Giselle was told by one of the judges that she looked at ease on the stage and flowed when she walked. She eventually won the 1986 Miss World title, and also won Miss World Americas Continental title. Her runners-up are Pia Rosenberg Larsen from Denmark (first runner-up) and Chantal Schreiber from Austria (second runner-up). She passed her crown to Ulla Weigerstorfer of Austria at the 1987 Miss World pageant on November 12, 1987.

== After Miss World ==
After winning the Miss World title she used her prize money to attend the Goldsmiths College, University of London where she completed a degree in Sociology and Communication. Laronde-West was awarded the Chaconia Medal Gold and had a BWIA plane named after her. She holds a third degree black belt in Shotokan karate with SKIF, and won several medals at world championships around the world. She is married to Heathcliff West and has two sons, Kye and Kristof, who previously attended Fatima College and are both black belt karatekas. Kye West was on the Trinidad and Tobago National Football under 21 team and obtained a football scholarship to Villanova University in the USA and College of Charleston, South Carolina, where he gained a BSc degree in Public Health. Kristof West represented Trinidad and Tobago in Water Polo and Karate at many competitions around the world and got accepted to Li Po Chun United World College from where he graduated in 2019. He went on to complete a Bachelors degree in Media and Performance at the University College of Utrecht, Netherlands. Giselle continues to live in her homeland of Trinidad and Tobago where she is the Executive Manager Customer Experience with the national carrier Caribbean Airlines. She previously worked with Hilton International Trinidad and Angostura Limited, maker of the famous Angostura Aromatic Bitters.

Awards and achievements
Preceded by (Iceland) Hólmfríður Karlsdóttir	Miss World; 1986	Succeeded by (Austria) Ulla Weigerstorfer
Preceded by (United States) Brenda Denton	Miss World Americas; 1986	Succeeded by (Venezuela) Albany Lozada
Preceded by Ulrica Christina Phillip	Miss Trinidad and Tobago World; 1986	Succeeded by Maria del Valle Xavier
