= Miss Gambia =

National Gambian Beauty pageant

The Miss Gambia Organization
- Formation: 1963
- Purpose: Beauty pageant
- Headquarters: Banjul
- Location: The Gambia
- Official language: English
- President: Ida Saine Conteh
- Key people: The Gambia Fashion Organisation
- Affiliations: Miss Universe

The Miss Gambia is a national beauty pageant in The Gambia. The pageant aims to be a cultural ambassador of The Gambia.

== History ==
The Miss Gambia beauty pageant aims to be the platform of young women in Gambia as ambassador of goodwill for the country. In 2001 the annual Miss Gambia had not been organized due to myriad reasons including financial, organizational and logistical problems. Miss Gambia winners also had experience in Miss Universe or Miss World history.

In 2022, a new organization under Ida Saine Conteh took over the Miss Gambia beauty pageant. The organization's plan is for The Gambia to return to the Miss Universe competition.

== Organizers ==
- 1963 — Roxy Vous (Miss Bathurst)
- 1965 — METTA Youth Club (Miss Independence)
- 1981 — Atta Promotion
- 2022 — Ida Saine Conteh (The Gambia Fashion Organisation)

== Titleholders ==
Year	The Miss Gambia
1963	Joana Jahumpa
1964	Ndey Jagne
1965	Elizabeth Thomas
1966	Oumie Barry
1967	Janie Jack
1969	Marie Carayol
1970	Princess Margaret Davies
1982	Abbey Scattrel Janneh
1983	Mirabelle Carayol
1984	Georgett Salleh
1985	Batura Jallow
1986	Rose Marie Eunson
1987	Ellen Forster
1988	Oumou Haidara Faye
1989	Fatou Jarra
1990	Mai Coker
2000	Astou Njie

== Titleholders under Miss Gambia org. ==
=== Miss Universe Gambia ===
- : Declared the Winner
- : Finished as a runner-up or top 5/6 qualification
- : Finished as one of the finalists or semi-finalists
- : Finished as aspecial awards winner

Year	Division	Miss Gambia	Placement at Miss Universe	Special Award(s)	Notes
Did not compete between 2001—present
2000	Kanifing	Astou Njie	Did not compete		Withdrew — Njie was originally to compete in Miss Universe 2001 in Bayamon. However, franchise problems with her national pageant removed her from the official roster.
Did not compete between 1987—1999
1986	Banjul	Rose Marie Eunson	Unplaced		
1985	Banjul	Batura Jallow	Unplaced		
1984	Banjul	Mirabelle Carayol	Unplaced		
1983	Banjul	Abbey Scattrel Janneh	Unplaced	Miss Congeniality	Atta Promotion Management.
