= Miss St. Kitts & Nevis =

National beauty pageant in Saint Kitts and Nevis

Miss Saint Kitts and Nevis Saint Kitts Queens Of Carnival
- Formation: 1958
- Type: Beauty pageant
- Headquarters: Basseterre
- Location: Saint Kitts and Nevis
- Official language: English
- Leader: Noah G. Mills (Chairman)
- Key people: St. Kitts-Nevis National Carnival Committee (SKNNCC)
- Staff: 5 (from St. Kitts & Nevis)
- Website: www.skncarnival.com

Miss St. Kitts and Nevis is a national beauty pageant in Saint Kitts and Nevis.

== History ==
In 1957, the first Miss St. Kitts and Nevis had chosen in under Basil Henderson directorship, Judy Mestier. Over the years since the start of St. Kitts National Carnival, thousands of people have converged on “Carnival City” to see, what many people consider to be, the premiere event of carnival, the National Queen Show. No other show, except the calypso final, has come dose In consistently attracting packed audience, not to forget the thousands more who “glue’ themselves to radios arid listen to the captivating descriptions of testants on stage This show strikes home, more than any other, to the heart of carnival in its annual selection of ambassador for St. Kitts and Nevis.

== Titleholders ==
From 1977 to 1981 Miss St. Kitts & Nevis winners competed at Miss Universe and from 1985 to 2015 participated at Miss World competition.

Year	Miss Saint Kitts and Nevis
1957	Judy Mestier
1958	Claudina Bagnal
1971	Hazel Brookes
1972	Louvina Bertie
1973	Marguerite Arthurton
1974	Jennifer Evelyn
1975	Shirley Webbe
1976	Annette Frank
1977	Aurelie Buchanan
1978	Cheryl Chadderton
1979	Cheryl Dore
1980	Marva Warner
1981	Ichel Jeffers
1982	Caroline Buchanan
1983	Ithlane Archibald
1984	Karen Grant
1985	Jacqueline Heyliger
1986	Jennifer Hensly
1987	Haley Cassius
1988	Rosie Hodge
1989	Carla Johnson
1990	Wendy Peets
1991	Janetta Maloney
1992	Uazel Glasford
1994	Tracy Thompson
1995	Youlouca Armony
1996	Gloria Esdaille
1997	Tamika Pereira
1998	Nicola St. Catherine
1999	Giselle Lewis
2000	Nicole Gumbs
2001	Wanda Connor
2002	Genieve Hanley
2003	Dibye Bass (resigned) then Correlle Ferlance
2004	Johan Kelly
2005	Genelle Howell
2006	Tesia Burton
2007	Mariece Roberts
2008	Samantha Boone
2009	Sudeakka Francis
2010	Iantavian Queeley
2011	Kalia Huggins
2012	Zinga Imo
2013	Kaeve Armstrong
2014	Tishima Browne
2015	Orngel Erskine
2016	Katherina Davis
2017	Sheniqua Lanns
2018	Tawanna Collins
2019	Hardai Baley
2020	n/a
2021	Nekirah Nicholls
2022	Shafeyah Guishard
2023	Desnarine Hanley
2024	Daneika Dickenson
