= Miss Saint Vincent and the Grenadines =

Beauty pageant

Miss Saint Vincent and the Grenadines Organization
- Formation: 1951
- Type: Beauty pageant
- Headquarters: Kingstown
- Location: Saint Vincent and the Grenadines
- Members: Miss World; Miss Universe
- Official language: English
- Chairperson of Beauty Show Committee: Aviar Charles
- Key people: Carnival Development Corporation (CDC)
- Website: www.vincymas.vc

Miss Saint Vincent and the Grenadines is a national beauty pageant in Saint Vincent and the Grenadines.

== History ==
The Miss SVG held for the first time in 1951 by Queen of Carnival of the Saint Vincent and the Grenadines. The name's title carried from 1951 to 1985. During this period Adult suffrage came into being and revolutionized the society. Reestablished as the new Miss SVG, would continue the tradition of empowering young Vincentian women. Carnival Development Corporation (CDC) is currently owning the most prestigious beauty pageant in the country.

== International competitions ==
Between 1964 and 2006, the winner of the Miss Saint Vincent and the Grenadines represented the country at the Miss Universe pageant. Meanwhile, the Miss World contestants from SVG made their participation between 1978 and 1994. Nowadays there is no option for SVG to return at Miss World.

== Titleholders ==
Year	Miss Saint Vincent and the Grenadines
Queen of Carnival
1951	Audrey Hazell
1952	Jean Isaacs
1953	Pamela Dopwell
1954	Agnes Veira
1955	Maureen Lawrence
1956	Fleur Cox
1957	Marcelle Antrobus
1958	Cecile Jardine
1959	Daphne Henry
1960	Juliette Nanton
1961	Josephine Sardine
1962	Flora Richardson
1963	Diana Bernard
1964	Stella Hadley
1965	Betty Boyea
1966	Anna Ellis
1967	Marcelle Alves
1968	Joy Bennette
1969	Norlon Baynes
1970	Erica Evans
1971	Carolyn Brisbane
1972	Pamela Hadaway
1973	Pearl King
1974	Janice Olliverre
1975	Vacita Parsons
1976	June Thorne
1977	Gaylene Collins
1978	Ingrid Mayers
1980	Cassandra Thomas
1981	Marcia – Ann Morris
1982	Charmine Theobalds
1983	Sherill Barnwell
1984	Donna Young
1985	Fay – Kathlyn Roberts
Miss SVG
1986	Mandy Haydock
1987	Nichole Hadaway
1988	Judy Charles
1989	Susan Bennett
1990	Samantha Robertson
1991	Nicole Hendrickson
1993	Wendy Bynoe
1994	Cornice Yearwood
1997	Georgian Richards
1998	Idinga Miller
1999	Kimone Baptiste
2000	Juanita Phillips
2001	Michelle Fife
2002	La Ferne Fraser
2003	Shivern Peters
2004	Javorne Williams
2005	Casynella Ollivierre
2006	Sheridan Lewis
2007	Melissa Yorke
2008	Ronique Dellimore
2009	Veronique Williams
2010	Aphesia Matthews
2011	Aviar Charles
2012	Carice Glasgow
2013	Shara George
2014	Shadeisha George
2015	Deyonte Mayers
2016	Nikianna Williams
2017	Jimelle Roberts
2018	Shellisa Nanton
2019	Sharikah Rodney
2022	Jada Ross
2023	Arena Foy
2024	Zada Stephens
