= Miss Barbados World =

Beauty pageant

- Formation: 1974
- Type: Beauty pageant
- Headquarters: Bridgetown
- Location: Barbados
- Members: Miss World
- Official language: English
- National Director: Leah Marville

Miss Barbados World beauty pageant selects representatives for the Miss World pageant from Barbados.

== Organization ==
The current Miss Barbados World Pageant franchise holder is Stephanie Chase. Before that the Franchise holder was Cortez Blacket, Stephanie Chase herself is a former Miss Barbados 2001 who won the talent portion at the Miss World contest in South Africa that year and later a five-year record contract. As of 2011, Stephanie Chase handed over the Miss Barbados World franchise to Leah Marville.

== Notable finishes ==
To date, the only Miss Barbados winner who has become a 'top ten finalist' in the Miss World pageant was Linda Yvonne Fields, who was placed eighth over-all in the 1974 Miss World Contest held at Royal Albert Hall, London, England. Since then, the only Miss Barbados who has been was predicted/projected to place at Miss World was the 2009 Miss Barbados title holder, Leah Marville.

In 2004 Kennifer Marius was placed 3rd in the Talent Competition behind Antigua and Barbuda, and China.

Stephanie Chase, Miss Barbados World 2001, won the first inaugural Miss World Talent Award. This led to Ms. Chase receiving a five-year contract from AMI/ Sony CEO Eliot Cohen. She recorded in the United Kingdom. A UK tour also followed in 2003.

== Titleholders ==
- : Declared as Winner
- : Ended as runner-up or top 5/6 qualification
- : Ended as one of the finalists or semifinalists
- : Ended as special awards winner

Year	Miss Barbados World	Placement at Miss World	Special Awards
2023	Ashley Carrington	Did not compete	
2022	Miss World 2021 was rescheduled to 16 March 2022 due to the COVID-19 pandemic outbreak in Puerto Rico, no edition started in 2022		
2021	Did not compete		
2020	Due to the impact of COVID-19 pandemic, no pageant in 2020		
2019	Che' Amor Greenidge	Unplaced	Miss World Talent (Top 27); Miss World Top Model (Top 40)
2018	Ashley Lashley	Top 30	Beauty with a Purpose (Top 25); Miss World Top Model (Top 32)
Did not compete between 2015—2017
2014	Zoé Elizabeth Trotman	Unplaced	People's Choice award (Top 10)
2013	Regina Ramjit	Unplaced	
2012	Marielle Eoen Wilkie	Unplaced	Miss World Sports (Top 24)
2011	Taisha Shaddai Carrington	Unplaced	Miss World Talent (Top 20); Miss World Beach Beauty (Top 20); Beauty with a Purpose (Top 30)
2010	Danielle Bishop	Unplaced	Miss World Beach Beauty (Top 40)
2009	Leah Janine Marville	Unplaced	Queen of Caribbean; People's Choice award; Beauty with a Purpose (2nd Runner-up); Miss World Beach Beauty (Top 12); Miss World Top Model (Top 12); Miss World Talent (Top 22)
2008	Natalie Olivia Griffith	Top 16	Miss World Talent
2007	Did not compete		
2006	Latoya Tamara McDowald	Unplaced	Miss World Talent (Top 10); Miss World Beach Beauty (Top 10); World Designer Dress Award (Top 10)
2005	Marielle Chetham Onyeche	Unplaced	
2004	Kennifer Marius	Unplaced	
2003	Raquel Olivia Wilkinson	Unplaced	
2002	Natalie Webb-Howell	Unplaced	
2001	Stephanie Chase	Unplaced	Miss World Talent
2000	Leilani McConney	Unplaced	
Did not compete between 1996—1999
1995	Rashi Holder	Unplaced	
Did not compete between 1991—1994
1990	Cheryl Jean Brewster	Unplaced	
1989	Did not compete		
1988	Ferida Kola	Unplaced	
1987	Dawn Michelle Waithe	Unplaced	
1986	Roslyn Irene Williams	Unplaced	
1985	Elizabeth "Liz" Dana Wadman	Unplaced	
1984	Gale Angela Thomas	Unplaced	
1983	Nina McIntosh-Clarke	Unplaced	
Did not compete between 1976—1982
1975	Peta Hazel Greaves	Unplaced	
1974	Linda Yvonne Field	Top 15	

== See also ==
- Miss Universe Barbados
