= Peter Marshall (British broadcaster) =

British broadcaster (born 1945)

- Occupation: Broadcaster

Peter Marshall is a television presenter. He co-hosted the Miss United Kingdom and Miss World pageants.
