= Miss Luxembourg =

Beauty contest

Miss Luxembourg org.
- Formation: 1927
- Type: Beauty pageant
- Headquarters: Luxembourg City
- Location: Luxembourg
- Members: Miss World
- Official language: Luxembourgish
- President: Hervé Lancelin
- Website: www.missluxembourg.lu

Miss Luxembourg is a national beauty pageant in Luxembourg.

== History ==
The Miss Luxembourg pageant has existed since 1927. The winner is expected to become the brand ambassador of the country. The national committee has required the candidates to have Luxembourg citizenship, to be between 18 and 26 years of age, to have a good reputation, to be unmarried, to have no children, to be ready to serve in social and humanitarian actions, and must not have posed for any nude photos. Between 1959 and 1994 the winner represented the country at Miss Universe pageant. Later, Miss Luxembourg is expected to represent Luxembourg at the Miss World competition.

== Titleholders ==
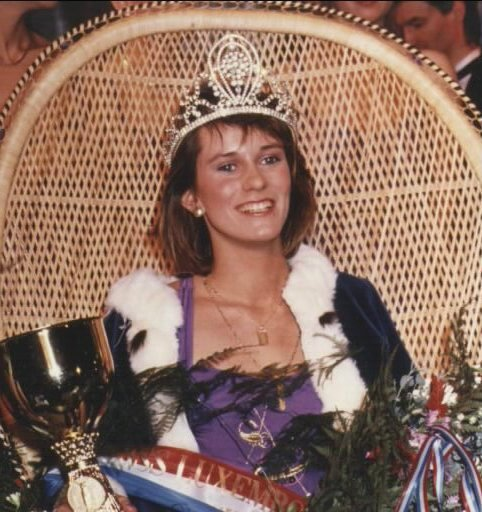
Chris Scott, Miss Luxembourg 1989

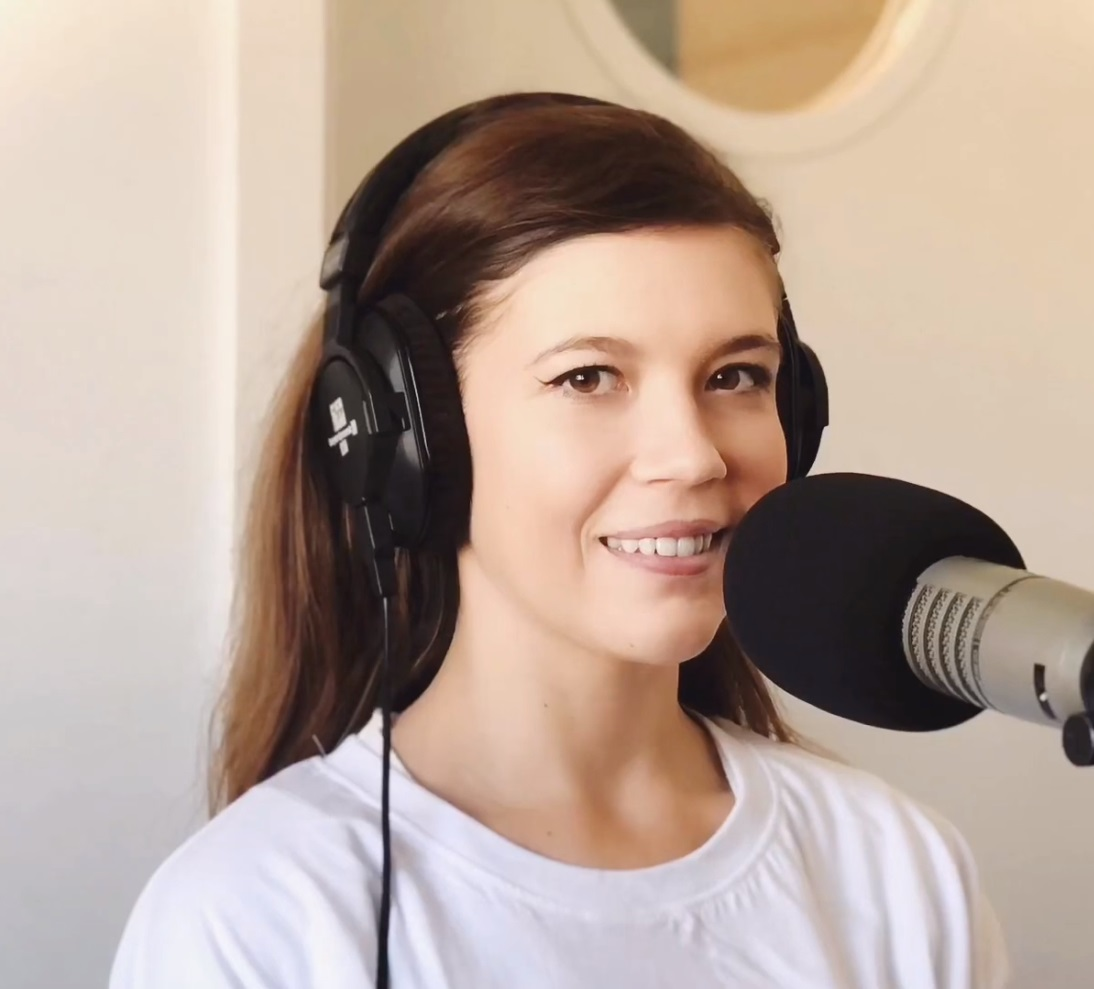
Melanie Heynsbroek, Miss Luxembourg 2019

Year	Miss Luxembourg
1927	Rose Blanc
1928	Anna Friedrich
1929	Ketty Hipp
1930	Alice Reger
1934	Marie Watgen
1939	Jeanny Diederich
1948	Josée Ewen
1957	Josée Jaminet
1958	Lydie Schmitz
1959	Josée Pundel
1960	Liliane Müller
1961	Vicky Schoos
1962	Fernande Kodesch
1963	Sylvie Welter
1964	Gaby Heyard
1965	Marianne Geisen
1966	Gigi Antinori
1967	Josée Mathgen
1968	Lucienne Krier
1969	Jacqueline Schaeffer
1972	Sylvie Dothée
1973	Lydia Maes
1974	Gisèle Azzeri
1975	Thérèse Manderschied
1976	Monique Wilmes
1984	Alexandra Krier
1985	Marianne Schnell
1986	Martine Pilot
1987	Claudine Atten
1988	Chantal Schanbacher
1989	Chris Scott
1990	Bea Jarzynska
1991	Annette Feydt
1992	Carole Reding
1993	Nathalie Dos Santos
1994	Sandy Wagner
1996	Christiane Lorent
2009	Diana Nilles
2010	Shari Thuyns
2011	Stéphanie Ribeiro
2012	Claudia Vitoria Müller
2013	Héloïse Paulmier
2014	Frédérique Wolff
2015	Vonessa Alijaj
2016	Ada Strock
2017	Julie Majerus
2018	Kelly Nilles
2019	Melanie Heynsbroek
2020	Émilie Boland
2021	Léa Sevenig
