= Norway at the Miss World =

Pageant participation

Norway has participated in 54 Miss World pageants since the pageant's inception in 1951. No Norwegian has won the title, although one was first runner-up in 1972.

== History ==
One of the two winners at the Miss Norway Pageant would compete at the Miss World. When the candidate does not qualify (due to age), another woman is sent. Norway sent its first Miss World representative to the third Miss World pageant in 1953. Norway has never won Miss World. Its best placement belongs to Ingeborg Sørensen, first runner-up to Miss World 1972.

== Titleholders ==
Color key

- Declared as Winner
- Ended as runner-up
- Ended as one of the finalists or semifinalists

Year	Miss Norway	Placement	Special Awards
1953	Solveig Gulbrandsen	Unplaced	
1958	Åse Qjeldvik	Top 12	
1959	Berit Grundvig	Unplaced	
1960	Grethe Solhoy	Unplaced	
1966	Birgit Andersen	Unplaced	
1967	Vigdis Sollie	Unplaced	
1968	Hedda Lie	Unplaced	
1969	Kjersti Jortun	6th runner-up	
1970	Aud Fosse	Unplaced	
1971	Kate Starvik	Unplaced	
1972	Ingeborg Sørensen	1st runner-up	
1973	Wenche Steen	Unplaced	
1974	Torill Mariann Larsen	Top 15	
1975	Sissel Gulbrandsen	Unplaced	
1976	Nina Kristine Rønneberg	Unplaced	
1977	Åshild Jenny Ottesen	Unplaced	
1978	Elisabet Klaeboe	Unplaced	
1979	Jeannette Aarum	Unplaced	
1980	Maiken Nielsen	Unplaced	
1981	Anita Nesbø	Unplaced	
1982	Janett Carine Krefting	Unplaced	
1983	Karen Elizabeth Dobloug	Unplaced	
1984	Ingrid Maria Martens	Unplaced	
1985	Karen Margrethe Moe	Unplaced	
1986	Inger Louise Berg	Unplaced	
1987	Mette Veiseth	Unplaced	
1988	Rita Paulsen	Top 10	
1989	Bente Brunland	Unplaced	
1990	Ingeborg Kolseth	Unplaced	
1991	Anne-Britt Røvik	Unplaced	
1992	Kjersti Brakestad	Unplaced	
1993	Rita Omvik	Unplaced	
1994	Anne Lena Hansen	Unplaced	
1995	Inger Lise Ebeltoft	Unplaced	
1996	Eva Sjøholt	Unplaced	
1997	Charlotte Høiåsen	Unplaced	
1999	Anette Haukaas	Semi-finalists	
2000	Stine Pedersen	Unplaced	
2001	Malin Johansen	Unplaced	
2002	Kathrine Sørland	Top 10	
2003	Elisabeth Wathne	Top 20	
2004	Hege Torresdal	Unplaced	
2005	Helene Tråsavik	Unplaced	
2006	Tonje Elise Skjærvik	Unplaced	
2007	Lisa-Mari Moen Jünge	Unplaced	
2008	Lene Egeli	Unplaced	
2009	Sara Skjoldnes	Unplaced	
2010	Mariann Birkedal	Top 7	Miss World Top Model
2011	Anna Larsen Zahl	Unplaced	
2012	Karoline Olsen	Unplaced	
2013	Alexandra Backstrom	Unplaced	
2014	Monica Pedersen	Unplaced	
2015	Fay Teresa Vålbekk	Unplaced	
2017	Celine Herregården	Unplaced	
2018	Madelen Michelsen	Unplaced	
