= List of Miss Universe countries =

List of participating countries and territories in the Miss Universe competition

This is a list of Miss Universe participating countries or territories since the inaugural edition of the competition in 1952 to the present.

== Entrants (1952–present) ==
Country/Territory	Debut	Participations	Years competed	National title	Placements	Best placement	First placed	Last placed	Notes
Albania	2002	22	2002–2003; 2005–2012; 2014–2024; 2026-present	Miss Universe Albania	4	Top 10: Anisa Kospiri (2002); Angela Martini (2010)	2002: Anisa Kospiri (Top 10)	2019: Cindy Marina (Top 20)	Won Miss Photogenic in 2016.
Argentina	1954	67	1954–1964; 1966–1994; 1996–2001; 2003; 2006–present	Miss Argentina	17	Winner: Norma Nolan (1962)	1954: Ivana Kislinger (Top 16)	2024: Magalí Benejam (Top 12)	Won Best in Swimsuit in 1970.
Armenia	2018	7	2018–2022; 2024–present	Miss Universe Armenia	0				
Aruba	1964	58	1964–1984; 1986; 1989–1990; 1992–present	Miss Aruba	4	1st runner-up: Taryn Mansell (1996)	1974: Maureen Vieira (4th runner-up)	2024: Anouk Eman (Top 30)	Won Miss Congeniality in 2000; Won Miss Press in 1978.
Australia	1952	62	1952–1954; 1958; 1964–1965; 1968–1990; 1992–2000; 2002–present	Miss Universe Australia	22	Winner: Kerry Anne Wells (1972); Jennifer Hawkins (2004)	1953: Maxine Morgan (4th runner-up)	2023: Moraya Wilson (2nd runner-up)	Won Miss Congeniality in 1996, 1997, 2010; Won Miss Photogenic in 1989; Won Best in Swimsuit in 1969, 1993; Won Miss Popular Girl in Parade in 1958.
Bahamas	1963	61	1963–1972; 1974–1983; 1985–present	Miss Universe Bahamas	1	Top 10: Chantel O'Brian (2021)	2021: Chantel O'Brian (Top 10)	2021: Chantel O'Brian (Top 10)	Competed as The Bahamas from 2021 until 2022. Won Miss Congeniality in 1981, 2001. Won Miss Photogenic in 1982.
Bangladesh	2019	3	2019; 2024; 2026-present	Miss Universe Bangladesh	1	Top 30: Tangia Methila (2025)	2025: Tangia Methila (Top 30)	2025: Tangia Methila (Top 30)	
Belarus	2024	2	2024–present	Miss Universe Belarus	0				
Belgium	1952	71	1952–1986; 1988–1989; 1991–1994; 1996–present	Miss Belgium	11	4th runner-up: Dominique Van Eeckhoudt (1981)	1955: Nicole De Meyer (Top 15)	2018: Zoé Brunet (Top 20)	Won Miss Congeniality in 1952; Won Miss Photogenic in 1972; Won Most Beautiful Hair in 1994.
Belize	1975	33	1975; 1977–1987; 1989–1991; 1993; 1995–2000; 2003–2005; 2007; 2016; 2018–2020; 2022; 2024–present	Miss Universe Belize	1	Top 12: Sarita Acosta (1979)	1979: Sarita Acosta (Top 12)	1979: Sarita Acosta (Top 12)	
Bolivia	1959	67	1959–present	Miss Bolivia	4	Top 6: Rosario Rico Toro (1990)	1964: Olga del Carpio (Top 15)	2024: Juliana Barrientos (Top 12)	Won Best in National Costume in 1959, 1970; Gold winner of Voice for Change 2024.
Bonaire	1967	11	1967–1969; 1978; 1995–1999; 2024–present	Miss Bonaire	0				
Botswana	1999	10	1999–2001; 2004; 2010–2013; 2024–present	Miss Universe Botswana	1	Winner: Mpule Kwelagobe (1999)	1999: Mpule Kwelagobe (Winner)	1999: Mpule Kwelagobe (Winner)	
Brazil	1954	71	1954–1989; 1991–present	Miss Universe Brazil	40	Winner: Iêda Maria Vargas (1963); Martha Vasconcellos (1968)	1954: Martha Rocha (1st runner-up)	2025: Gabriela Lacerda (Top 30)	Won Best in National Costume in 1967, 1981, 1987, 1989; Won Best in Swimsuit in 1969; Won Miss Popular Girl in Parade in 1954.
British Virgin Islands	1977	41	1977; 1979–2002; 2010–present	Miss British Virgin Islands	0				
Cambodia	2017	9	2017–present	Miss Universe Cambodia	1	Top 30: Davin Prasath 2024	2024: Davin Prasath (Top 30)	2024: Davin Prasath (Top 30)	Gold winner of Voice for Change 2024
Cameroon	2020	6	2020–2024; 2026–present	Miss Cameroon	1	Top 20: Issie Princesse 2023	2023: Issie Princesse (Top 20)	2023: Issie Princesse (Top 20)	
Canada	1952	74	1952–present	Miss Universe Canada	22	Winner: Karen Dianne Baldwin (1982); Natalie Glebova (2005)	1953: Thelma Brewis (Top 16)	2025: Jaime VandenBerg (Top 30)	Competed as Dominion of Canada from 1965 to 1972. Won Miss Congeniality in 1977; Won Miss Popular Girl in Parade in 1957.
Cape Verde	2025	2	2025–present	Miss Cape Verde	0				
Cayman Islands	1980	35	1980–1985; 1989–1996; 1999–2004; 2006; 2008–2009; 2011–2012; 2015–present	Miss Cayman Islands	0				Won Miss Congeniality in 1980, 1982.
Chile	1952	62	1952; 1954–1956; 1958; 1960–1961; 1964; 1966–1970; 1972–2002; 2004–2006; 2011–present	Miss Universo Chile	16	Winner: Cecilia Bolocco (1987)	1954: Gloria Leguisos (Top 16)	2025: Inna Moll (Top 12)	Won Miss Congeniality in 1973; Won Miss Popular Vote in 2024; Won Miss Popular Girl in Parade in 1952.
China	2002	23	2002–2022; 2024–present	Miss Universe China	6	2nd runner-up: Zhuō Líng (2002)	2002: Zhuō Líng (2nd runner-up)	2025: Zhao Na (Top 12)	Won Miss Universe Asia in 2025; Won Best in National Costume in 2012; Won Miss Congeniality in 2007, 2009, 2013.
Colombia	1958	68	1958–present	Miss Universe Colombia	40	Winner: Luz Marina Zuluaga (1958); Paulina Vega (2014)	1958: Luz Marina Zuluaga (Winner)	2025: Vanessa Pulgarin (Top 12)	Won Best in National Costume in 1968, 1985, 1990, 1991, 1997, 2002; Won Miss Photogenic in 1975, 1987; Won Best in Swimsuit in 1969.
Costa Rica	1954	70	1954–1957; 1959–1960; 1962–present	Miss Universe Costa Rica	7	Top 10: Nancy Soto (2004); Johanna Solano (2011); Natalia Carvajal (2018); Ivonne Cerdas (2020)	1954: Marian Esquivel (Top 15)	2025: Mahyla Roth (Top 30)	Won Miss Congeniality in 1956; Won Miss Photogenic in 1978, 2025.
Croatia	1997	29	1997–present	Miss Universe Croatia	5	Top 15: Sarah Ćosić (2009)	2009: Sarah Ćosić (Top 15)	2025: Laura Gnjatović (Top 30)	
Cuba	1952	16	1952; 1954–1963; 1965–1967; 2024–present	Miss Universe Cuba	4	3rd runner-up: María Rosa Gamio (1957)	1956: Marcia Rodríguez (Top 15)	2025: Lina Luaces (Top 12)	
Curaçao	1963	58	1963–1978; 1980–1987; 1989; 1991–1999; 2001–2005; 2007–present	Miss Curaçao	8	1st runner-up: Anne Marie Braafheid (1968)	1968: Anne Marie Braafheid (1st runner-up)	2022: Gabriëla Dos Santos (Top 5)	Won Miss Congeniality in 1966; Won Best in Swimsuit in 1997.
Czech Republic	1993	32	1993; 1995–present	Miss Universe Czechia	6	Top 10: Pavlina Barbuková (1993); Kateřina Smrzová (2003); Iveta Lutovská (2009)	1993: Pavlina Barbuková (Top 10)	2010: Jitka Válková (Top 15)	
Democratic Republic of the Congo	1968	10	1968–1972; 1984–1986; 2024–present	Miss Universe DR Congo	2	2nd runner-up: Benita Mureka (1985)	1985: Benita Mureka (2nd runner-up)	1986: Likobe Dobala (Top 10)	Competes as DR Congo in the pageant. Competed as Zaire from 1972 to 1986. Won Miss Congeniality in 1972.
Denmark	1952	56	1952–1953; 1958–1961; 1963–1970; 1972–1973; 1975–1990; 1992–1996; 2000; 2004–2008; 2010–2013; 2015–2016; 2018–2021; 2023–present	Miss Denmark	9	Winner: Victoria Kjær Theilvig (2024)	1953: Jytte Olsen (Top 15)	2024: Victoria Kjær Theilvig (Winner)	Won Miss Photogenic in 1981, 2018
Dominican Republic	1956	63	1956; 1962–1964; 1967–present	Miss Dominican Republic	14	Winner: Amelia Vega (2003)	1977: Blanca Sardiñas (Top 12)	2025: Jennifer Ventura (Top 30)	Won Best in National Costume in 2003; Won Miss Congeniality in 1962.
Ecuador	1955	68	1955–1966; 1968–1972; 1975–present	Miss Universe Ecuador	4	2nd runner-up: Constanza Báez (2013)	1981: Lucía Vinueza (Top 12)	2024: Mara Topić (Top 30)	Won Miss Photogenic in 1992.
Egypt	1987	30	1987–1990; 1992; 1994–2011; 2014; 2017–2019; 2023–present	Miss Universe Egypt	1	Top 30: Logina Salah 2024	2024: Logina Salah (Top 30)	2024: Logina Salah (Top 30)	Co-Won Miss Congeniality in 2017.
El Salvador	1954	53	1954–1955; 1972–1979; 1982–2015; 2017–present	Miss El Salvador	5	1st runner-up: Maribel Arrieta (1955)	1955: Maribel Arrieta (1st runner-up)	2023: Isabella García-Manzo (Top 10)	Won Miss Congeniality in 1955, 2008; Won Miss Followed by Media in 1985.
Equatorial Guinea	2019	6	2019; 2021–present	Miss Equatorial Guinea	0				
Estonia	1993	21	1993–2004; 2006–2009; 2011–2013; 2024–present	Miss Universe Estonia	2	Top 10: Kristiina Heinmets (1997); Evelyn Mikomägi (2000)	1997: Kristina Heinmets (Top 10)	2000: Evelyn Mikomägi (Top 10)	
Ethiopia	2004	9	2004–2006; 2009; 2012–2014; 2017; 2026-present	Miss Universe Ethiopia	1	Top 20: Dina Fekadu (2006)	2006: Dina Fekadu (Top 20)	2006: Dina Fekadu (Top 20)	
Finland	1952	70	1952–1955; 1960–present	Miss Finland	19	Winner: Armi Kuusela (1952); Anne Marie Pohtamo (1975)	1952: Armi Kuusela (Winner)	2024: Matilda Wirtavuori (Top 30)	Won Miss Universe Europe and Middle East in 2024; Won Miss Photogenic in 1974; Won Best in Swimsuit in 1969.
France	1952	74	1952–present	Miss Universe France	24	Winner: Christiane Martel (1953); Iris Mittenaere (2016)	1953: Christiane Martel (Winner)	2025: Ève Gilles (Top 30)	
Germany	1952	72	1952–2019; 2021–2024; 2026–present	Miss Universe Germany	21	Winner: Marlene Schmidt (1961)	1952: Renate Hoy (4th runner-up)	2002: Natascha Börger (Top 10)	Won Miss Photogenic in 1956, 1957.
Ghana	1991	24	1991; 1993; 1996; 1998–2002; 2004; 2006; 2008–2015; 2017–2018; 2020–2022; 2025–present	Miss Universe Ghana	2	Top 10: Akuba Cudjoe (1999)	1999: Akuba Cudjoe (Top 10)	2017: Ruth Quarshie (Top 16)	Won Miss Congeniality in 1993, 2006.
Great Britain	1952	30	1952; 1991–1996; 1998–2000; 2005–2006; 2008–present	Miss Universe Great Britain	5	Top 10: Amy Willerton (2013)	2013: Amy Willerton (Top 10)	2021: Emma Collingridge (Top 16)	Competed as Great Britain in 1952 as England from 1955 to 1962 and then again from 1964 to 1990 as Scotland from 1961 to 1986 and then again from 1988 to 1990 and as Wales from 1961 to 1990 competed together again as United Kingdom in 1991 as Great Britain from 1992 to 2000 as United Kingdom for the second time in 2005 and 2006 shortened to UK in 2008 and once again as Great Britain from 2009.
Greece	1952	69	1952–1987; 1989–2015; 2018; 2021–present	Star GS Hellas	18	Winner: Corinna Tsopei (1964)	1952: Ntaizy Mavraki (2nd runner-up)	2005: Evangelia Aravani (Top 15)	Won Miss Congeniality in 1954, 1961; Won Miss Photogenic in 1967.
Guadeloupe	1977	8	1977; 1980–1984; 2024–present	Miss Universe Guadeloupe	1	Top 12: Ophély Mézino (2025)	2025: Ophély Mézino (Top 12)	2025: Ophély Mézino (Top 12)	With the change in the Miss France franchise, the territory can now compete separately.
Guatemala	1955	54	1955–1959; 1961; 1975–1976; 1978–2018; 2021–present	Miss Guatemala	4	Top 10: Ilma Urrutia (1984); Jessica Scheel (2010)	1955: María del Rosario Molina (Top 15)	2025: Raschel Paz (Top 30)	Won Best in National Costume in 1975; Won Miss Congeniality in 2012; Gold winner of Voice for Change 2024.
Guinea	2024	2	2024–present	Miss Universe Guinea	0				
Guyana	1956	25	1956; 1963–1966; 1999; 2002–2007; 2009–2017; 2023-present	Miss Universe Guyana	0				Competed as British Guiana until 1966.
Haiti	1962	21	1962; 1968; 1975; 1977; 1985; 1989; 2010–2022; 2025–present	Miss Haiti	4	1st runner-up: Gerthie David (1975); Raquel Pélissier (2016)	1962: Evelyn Miot (Top 15)	2022: Mideline Phelizor (Top 16)	
Honduras	1954	54	1954–1955; 1967–1974; 1976–1990; 1992–1994; 1996–2002; 2007–present	Miss Honduras	1	Top 15: Pastora Pagán (1955)	1955: Pastora Pagán (Top 15)	1955: Pastora Pagán (Top 15)	Won Miss Congeniality in 1987; Won Best Skin Award in 2024.
Hong Kong	1952	40	1952; 1954; 1960; 1962; 1964–1965; 1967–1970; 1972–1991; 1993–2000; 2024–present	Miss Universe Hong Kong	6	2nd runner-up: Virginia Lee (1954)	1952: Judy Dan (3rd runner-up)	1988: Pauline Yeung (4th runner-up)	Was under British colonial rule until 1997. Hong Kong has competed in Miss Universe China between 2002 and 2023.
Hungary	1992	30	1992–2016; 2018; 2021; 2023–present	Miss Universe Hungary	4	Top 10: Ágnes Konkoly (2012)	2006: Adrienn Bende (Top 20)	2018: Enikő Kecskès (Top 20)	
Iceland	1956	50	1956–1957; 1959–1972; 1974–1986; 1988–1997; 2006; 2009; 2016–2024; 2026–present	Miss Iceland	6	1st runner-up: Anna Geirsdóttir (1962)	1959: Sigríður Þorvaldsdóttir (Top 15)	2019: Birta Abiba Þórhallsdóttir (Top 10)	Won Miss Congeniality and Miss Unity (Miss Amity) in 1974.
India	1952	62	1952; 1964–1987; 1989–present	Miss Universe India	29	Winner: Sushmita Sen (1994); Lara Dutta (2000); Harnaaz Sandhu (2021)	1966: Yasmin Daji (3rd runner-up)	2025: Manika Vishwakarma (Top 30)	Won Best in National Costume in 1978, 1980, 1984; Won Best in Swimsuit in 2000.
Iraq	1972	3	1972; 2017; 2025-present	Miss Iraq	0				
Ireland	1961	61	1961–2006; 2008–2012; 2014–2015; 2017–2021; 2023–present	Miss Universe Ireland	10	2nd runner-up: Marlene McKeown (1963); Roberta Brown (1983)	1963: Marlene McKeown (2nd runner-up)	2018: Grainne Gallanagh (Top 20)	Won Miss Photogenic in 1963, 1991.
Israel	1952	71	1952; 1954–2021; 2024–present	Miss Universe Israel	20	Winner: Rina Messinger (1976)	1956: Sara Tal (Top 16)	2005: Elena Ralph (Top 10)	Won Best in National Costume in 1963, 1966.
Italy	1952	72	1952–1991; 1993–2005; 2007–present	Miss Universo Italia	16	1st runner-up: Daniela Bianchi (1960); Roberta Capua (1987)	1953: Rita Stazzi (Top 16)	2014: Valentina Bonariva (Top 15)	Won Miss Congeniality in 2004; Won Miss Photogenic in 1960, 1964, 1986.
Jamaica	1961	53	1961; 1963–1966; 1968–1975; 1986–2024; 2026-present	Miss Jamaica Universe	10	1st runner-up: Yendi Phillipps (2010)	1989: Sandra Foster (Top 10)	2023: Jordanne Levy (Top 20)	
Japan	1952	72	1952–1995; 1998–present	Miss Universe Japan	22	Winner: Akiko Kojima (1959); Riyo Mori (2007)	1953: Kinuko Ito (2nd runner-up)	2025: Kaori Hashimoto (Top 30)	Won Best National Costume in 2006, 2017; Won Miss Congeniality in 1958, 1968, 1979.
Jordan	1960	1	1960; 2026-present	Miss Jordan					Contest banned due to uproar among citizens.
Kazakhstan	2006	16	2006–2008; 2010–2011; 2013–2014; 2016–2021; 2023–present	Miss Kazakhstan	0				
Kenya	1987	13	1987; 1992; 1995; 2002; 2004–2005; 2014; 2016; 2018–2019; 2021; 2024; 2026–present	Miss Universe Kenya	1	Top 6: Mary Esther Were (2016)	2016: Mary Esther Were (Top 6)	2016: Mary Esther Were (Top 6)	
Korea	1954	71	1954–1955; 1957–present	Miss Queen Korea	8	1st runner-up: Jang Yoon-jeong (1988)	1959: Oh Hyun-ju (Top 15)	2007: Lee Hanee (3rd runner-up)	Competes as Korea in the pageant. Won Best in National Costume in 1974, 1977, 1983, 2001; Won Miss Congeniality in 2016; Won Most Popular Girl in Parade in 1959.
Kosovo	2008	15	2008–2012; 2014–2016; 2018–2023; 2025–present	Miss Universe Kosovo	4	2nd runner-up: Marigona Dragusha (2009)	2008: Zana Krasniqi (Top 10)	2012: Diana Avdiu (Top 16)	Won Miss Photogenic in 2012.
Kyrgyzstan	2018	4	2018; 2022; 2024–present	Miss Kyrgyzstan	0				
Latvia	2005	5	2005–2006; 2023–present	Miss Universe Latvia	1	Top 10: Ieva Kokoreviča (2005)	2005: Ieva Kokoreviča (Top 10)	2005: Ieva Kokoreviča (Top 10)	
Lebanon	1955	45	1955; 1960–1962; 1966; 1968; 1970–1971; 1973–1975; 1977–1978; 1983–1988; 1991–1993; 1996–2001; 2004–2007; 2009–2015; 2017–2018; 2022–present	Miss Lebanon	3	Winner: Georgina Rizk (1971)	1962: Nouhad El Cabbabe (Top 15)	1973: Marcèlle Herro (Top 12)	
Lithuania	2012	4	2012–2014; 2019; 2026-present	Miss Lithuania					
Macau	2024	2	2024–present	Miss Universe Macau	1	Top 30: Cassandra Chiu 2024	2024: Cassandra Chiu (Top 30)	2024: Cassandra Chiu (Top 30)	
Malta	1968	44	1968–2001; 2016–present	Miss Malta Universe	1	Top 12: Julia Cluett (2025)	2025: Julia Cluett (Top 12)	2025: Julia Cluett (Top 12)	Competed as Republic of Malta from 1989 to 1994; Won Miss Universe Europe and Middle East in 2025; Won Miss Congeniality in 2022.
Martinique	1957	7	1957; 1981–1984; 2024–present	Miss Universe Martinique	0				With the change in the Miss France franchise, the territory can now compete separately.
Mayotte	2025	1	2025–present	Miss Universe Mayotte	0				With the change in the Miss France franchise, the territory can now compete separately.
Mexico	1952	68	1952–1959; 1965; 1967–present	Miss Universe Mexico	23	Winner: Lupita Jones (1991); Ximena Navarrete (2010); Andrea Meza (2020); Fátima Bosch (2025)	1952: Olga Llorens (Top 10)	2025: Fátima Bosch (Winner)	Won Best in National Costume in 1971, 2000; Won Best in Swimsuit in 2008; Won Best Style in 1998, 2000; Won Best Figure in 2008; Won Miss Clairol Herbal Essences 1998, 2000.
Moldova	2024	2	2024–present	Miss Universe Moldova	0				
Mongolia	2018	4	2018–2019; 2023–2024; 2026–present	Miss Universe Mongolia	0				
Montenegro	2007	8	2007–2009; 2011–2012; 2015; 2024; 2026-present	Miss Montenegro	0				Won Miss Congeniality in 2011.
Myanmar	1959	15	1959–1961; 2013–2020; 2022–present	Miss Universe Myanmar	1	Top 21: Thuzar Wint Lwin (2020)	2020: Thuzar Wint Lwin (Top 21)	2020: Thuzar Wint Lwin (Top 21)	Competed as Burma until 1961. Won Best in National Costume in 2016 and 2020; Won miss Congeniality in 1960.
Namibia	1981	32	1981–1984; 1991–2000; 2002–2003; 2005–2006; 2009; 2012–2013; 2016–2019; 2021–present	Miss Namibia	3	Winner: Michelle McLean (1992)	1992: Michelle McLean (Winner)	2023: Jameela Uiras (Top 20)	South West Africa/Namibia wasn't allowed to compete in 1985 due to the fact that it was a mandate of South Africa. Namibia returned in 1991 when it was gained independence from South Africa and renamed Republic of Namibia. Won Miss Congeniality in 1994.
Netherlands	1956	65	1956; 1958–1996; 1998; 2000–2005; 2008–present	Miss Universe Netherlands	14	Winner: Angela Visser (1989)	1958: Corine Rottschäfer (Top 16)	2025: Nathalie Mogbelzada (Top 30)	Competed as Holland until 1990. Won Best in National Costume in 1964; Won Miss Photogenic in 1958, 1985
New Zealand	1954	57	1954; 1960; 1962–1989; 1992–2001; 2003; 2006–2019; 2024–present	Miss Universe New Zealand	5	Winner: Lorraine Downes (1983)	1962: Leslie Nichols (Top 15)	1992: Lisa de Montalk (Top 10)	Won Miss Photogenic in 1969, 1980, 2015
Nicaragua	1955	43	1955; 1963; 1968–1971; 1973–1978; 1991–1993; 1995; 1998–1999; 2001–present	Miss Universe Nicaragua	7	Winner: Sheynnis Palacios (2023)	1977: Beatriz Obregón (Top 12)	2025: Itza Castillo (Top 30)	Won Best in National Costume in 2013.
Nigeria	1964	37	1964; 1987–1995; 1998–2019; 2021–present	Miss Universe Nigeria	3	1st runner-up: Chidimma Adetshina (2024)	2001: Agbani Darego (Top 10)	2024: Chidimma Adetshina (1st runner-up)	Won Miss Universe Africa and Oceania in 2024; Won Best National Costume in 2021; Won Miss Congeniality in 1995, 2014.
Norway	1952	65	1952–1955; 1958–1973; 1976–1996; 1998; 2000–2010; 2012–2021; 2023–present	Miss Norway	17	Winner: Mona Grudt (1990)	1953: Synnøve Gulbrandsen (Top 16)	2005: Helene Tråsavik (Top 15)	Won Best in National Costume in 1993.
Pakistan	2023	3	2023–present	Miss Universe Pakistan	1	Top 20: Erica Robin 2023	2023: Erica Robin (Top 20)	2023: Erica Robin (Top 20)	
Panama	1952	58	1952–1954; 1964–1967; 1970–1971; 1973–1987; 1991–2023; 2025–present	Señorita Panamá	10	1st runner-up (Winner): Justine Pasek (2002) (replaced dethroned winner)	1953: Emita Arosemena (Top 16)	2021: Brenda Smith (Top 16)	Won Best in National Costume in 1986, 2004, 2009, 2011; Co-won Miss Congeniality in 2017.
Paraguay	1957	63	1957–1958; 1960–1967; 1970; 1972–2001; 2004–present	Reinas del Paraguay	6	1st runner-up: Nadia Ferreira (2021)	1964: Miriam Riart (Top 15)	2025: Yanina Gómez (Top 30)	Won Best in National Costume in 1992; Fanvote winner in 2025; Beyond the Crown winner in 2025
Peru	1952	71	1952–1954; 1956–1972; 1975–present	Miss Peru	23	Winner: Gladys Zender (1957)	1953: Mary Ann Sarmiento (Top 16)	2024: Tatiana Calmell (Top 12)	Won Miss Universe Americas in 2024; Won Best National Costume in 1972, 1976, 1982; Won Miss Congeniality in 1971; Won Best in Swimsuit in 1969; Won Most Beautiful Hair in 1995.
Philippines	1952	70	1952–1957; 1962–present	Miss Universe Philippines	29	Winner: Gloria Diaz (1969); Margie Moran (1973); Pia Wurtzbach (2015); Catriona Gray (2018)	1954: Blesilda Ocampo (Top 16)	2025: Ahtisa Manalo (3rd runner-up)	Won Miss Universe Asia in 2024; Won Best in National Costume in 1994, 2019, 2023, 2024, 2025; Won Miss Photogenic in 1971, 1973, 1996, 1997, 2005, 2006, 2007; Fanvote winner in 2013, 2023; Won Best Style in 1999, 2005; Won Most Beautiful Hair in 1994; Won Miss Clairol Herbal Essence Award in 1999; Gold winner of Voice for Change 2023
Poland	1958	42	1958–1959; 1984–1986; 1989–present	Miss Polonia	6	3rd runner-up: Brygida Bziukiewicz (1986); Joanna Gapińska (1989)	1958: Alicja Bobrowska (4th runner-up)	2018: Magdalena Swat (Top 20)	Won Miss Congeniality in 2019; Won Miss Photogenic in 2013.
Portugal	1960	43	1960; 1962; 1965; 1970–1974; 1979; 1981–1990; 1992–2002; 2011; 2014–present	Miss Portugal	4	Top 10: Laura Gonçalves (2011)	2011: Laura Gonçalves (Top 10)	2023: Marina Machete (Top 20)	Won Miss Congeniality in 1999; Fanvote Winner in 2011.
Puerto Rico	1952	71	1952–1957; 1961–present	Miss Universe Puerto Rico	28	Winner: Marisol Malaret (1970); Deborah Carthy-Deu (1985); Dayanara Torres (1993); Denise Quiñones (2001); Zuleyka Rivera (2006)	1970: Marisol Malaret (Winner)	2025: Zashely Alicea (Top 12)	Won Miss Congeniality in 1957; Won Miss Photogenic in 1999, 2001, 2002, 2003, 2004 & 2014; Won Best in Swimsuit in 2001; Gold winner of Voice for Change 2023.
Réunion	1977	11	1977–1986; 2026-present	Miss Réunion	0				With the change in the Miss France franchise, the territory can now compete separately.
Romania	1991	20	1991–1998; 2009–2013; 2016–2017; 2019–2021; 2024–present	Miss Universe Romania	0				
Russia	1994	31	1994–2018; 2020–present	Miss Russia	9	Winner (dethroned/resigned): Oxana Fedorova (2002)	1996: Ilmira Shamsutdinova (Top 6)	2024: Valentina Alekseeva (Top 12)	Miss Russia 2002 was the original winner of Miss Universe 2002, but was later dethroned for failure to fulfill her duties as Miss Universe. She stated she voluntarily resigned the title. Won Best in National Costume in 1996; Won Best in Swimsuit in 2002.
Saint Lucia	1977	13	1977; 2006–2007; 2011–2012; 2014; 2017–2019; 2022–present	Miss Saint Lucia Universe	0				
Saint Martin	2026	1	2026–present	Miss Universe Saint Martin	0				
Serbia	2007	11	2007–2015; 2024–present	Miss Serbia	1	Top 30: Ivana Trišić 2024	2024: Ivana Trišić (Top 30)	2024: Ivana Trišić (Top 30)	
Sierra Leone	2016	3	2016; 2019; 2026-present	Face of Sierra Leone					
Slovakia	1994	32	1994–present	Miss Universe Slovakia	1	Top 6: Silvia Lakatošová (1994)	1994: Silvia Lakatošová (Top 6)	1994: Silvia Lakatošová (Top 6)	Competed as Slovak Republic from 1994 until 2022. Won Miss Photogenic in 1998.
South Africa	1952	50	1952–1953; 1960–1968; 1975–1979; 1981–1984; 1995–2023; 2025–present	African Beauty International	27	Winner: Margaret Gardiner (1978); Demi-Leigh Nel-Peters (2017); Zozibini Tunzi (2019)	1952: Catherine Higgins (Top 10)	2023: Bryoni Govender (Top 20)	South Africa was not allowed to participate between 1985 and 1994 because of apartheid.
Spain	1960	66	1960–present	Miss Universe Spain	20	Winner: Amparo Muñoz (1974)	1960: María Teresa del Río (4th runner-up)	2023: Athenea Pérez (Top 10)	Won Best in National Costume in 1973, 1995; Won Miss Congeniality in 1966, 2023; Won Miss Photogenic in 1984, 1993, 2000; Won Best in Swimsuit in 1999.
Sri Lanka	1955	48	1955; 1957; 1961–1966; 1968–1970; 1973–1983; 1985–1996; 2005–2006; 2008; 2010–2014; 2016–2018; 2024–present	Miss Universe Sri Lanka	2	2nd runner-up: Maureen Hingert (1955)	1955: Maureen Hingert (2nd runner-up)	2017: Christina Peiris (Top 16)	Competed as Ceylon until 1973. Won Miss Congeniality in 2018.
Suriname	1958	23	1958; 1960; 1963–1964; 1966; 1969–1974; 1976–1979; 1982; 1989–1993; 1999; 2024; 2026–present	Miss Suriname	1	Top 15: Gertrud Gummels (1958)	1958: Gertrud Gummels (Top 15)	1958: Gertrud Gummels (Top 15)	Competed as Surinam until 1982.
Sweden	1952	67	1952–2004; 2006; 2009–2019; 2021; 2025-present	Miss Universe Sweden	29	Winner: Hillevi Rombin (1955); Margareta Arvidsson (1966); Yvonne Ryding (1984)	1952: Anne Marie Thistler (Top 10)	2009: Renate Cerljen (Top 15)	Sweden dropped out from the Miss Universe for the first time in 2005 after arguments about the swimsuit competition. Won Miss Photogenic in 1966, 1995, 2011.
Switzerland	1953	60	1953; 1960–1984; 1986–1990; 1992–2014; 2016; 2018; 2022–present	Miss Universe Switzerland	12	2nd runner-up: Lauriane Gilliéron (2006)	1960: Elaine Maurath (Top 15)	2013: Dominique Rinderknecht (Top 16)	Won Miss Photogenic in 1983.
Tanzania	2007	14	2007–2017; 2019; 2024-present	Miss Universe Tanzania	1	Top 10: Flaviana Matata (2007)	2007: Flaviana Matata (Top 10)	2007: Flaviana Matata (Top 10)	
Trinidad and Tobago	1963	48	1963–1964; 1966; 1971; 1973–1991; 1993–2006; 2008; 2010–2014; 2017; 2022–present	Miss Universe Trinidad and Tobago	9	Winner: Janelle Commissiong (1977); Wendy Fitzwilliam (1998)	1977: Janelle Commissiong (Winner)	2022: Tya Jané Ramey (Top 16)	Competed as Trinidad in 1963 and 1964. Won Best in National Costume in 1998, 1999; Won Miss Photogenic in 1977; Won Miss Congeniality in 1975, 1976, 1978, 2024.
Tunisia	1960	8	1960; 1964–1965; 1968–1971; 2026–present	Miss Tunisie					Won Miss Congeniality in 1969.
Turks and Caicos Islands	1980	31	1980–1997; 1999–2001; 2004–2008; 2011; 2013–2014; 2024–present	Miss Universe Turks and Caicos	1	Top 10: Carmelita Ariza (1987)	1987: Carmelita Ariza (Top 10)	1987: Carmelita Ariza (Top 10)	Initially competed as Turks and Caicos Islands, BW (British West Indies), shortened to Turks and Caicos since 1983. Competed in Miss Universe United Kingdom from 2005 to 2006. Won Miss Congeniality in 1989 and 1992.
Uganda	2026	1	2026–present	Miss Universe Uganda	0				
Ukraine	1995	31	1995–present	Miss Ukraine Universe	6	1st runner-up: Olesya Stefanko (2011)	2006: Inna Tsymbalyuk (Top 20)	2014: Diana Harkusha (2nd-runner-up)	Won Best in National Costume in 2022.
United States	1952	73	1952–1956; 1958–present	Miss USA	68	Winner: Miriam Stevenson (1954); Carol Morris (1956); Linda Bement (1960); Sylvia Hitchcock (1967); Shawn Weatherly (1980); Chelsi Smith (1995); Brook Lee (1997); Olivia Culpo (2012); R'Bonney Gabriel (2022)	1952: Jackie Loughery (Top 10)	2025: Audrey Eckert (Top 30)	In 1957 Mary Leona Gage was disqualified to discover that she was the mother of two children. Competed as United States of America until 1966, shortened to U.S.A. from 1967 to 1981, then the dots were removed, remaining USA written on the sash from 1982. Won Best in National Costume in 1965; Won Miss Photogenic in 1961, 1975; Won Best in Swimsuit in 1995; Won Most Popular Girl in Parade in 1953, 1956.
United States Virgin Islands	1961	44	1961–1962; 1967–1968; 1971–1989; 1991–1993; 1995; 1997–1999; 2001–2002; 2005–2007; 2010–2011; 2016–2019; 2024–present	Miss US Virgin Islands	1	Top 12: Cherrie Creque (1971)	1971: Cherrie Creque (Top 12)	1971: Cherrie Creque (Top 12)	Competed as Virgin Islands until 1978. Now competes as US Virgin Islands. Won Miss Congeniality in 1991, 2002, 2005.
Uruguay	1952	70	1952–1965; 1967–2002; 2004–2012; 2014–2020; 2022; 2024–present	Miss Uruguay	6	4th runner-up: Andrea López (1985)	1952: Gladys Fajardo (Top 10)	1985: Andrea López (4th runner-up)	Won Best in National Costume in 1979.
Uzbekistan	2024	1	2024; 2026-present	Miss Universe Uzbekistan	0				
Venezuela	1952	72	1952–1953; 1955–1958; 1960–present	Miss Venezuela	49	Winner: Maritza Sayalero (1979); Irene Sáez (1981); Bárbara Palacios (1986); Alicia Machado (1996); Dayana Mendoza (2008); Stefanía Fernández (2009); Gabriela Isler (2013)	1955: Susana Duijm (Top 15)	2025: Stephany Abasali (2nd runner-up)	Won Miss Universe Americas in 2025; Won Miss Photogenic in 1994; Best in Swimsuit in 1994, 1996, 1997, 1998; Won Best Style Finesse 1996; Won Miss Clairol Herbal Essences 1993; Won Flawless of the Universe in 2016

=== Replaced pageants ===
The following list consists of the delegations that have acquired the national Miss Universe franchise and replaced a former national pageant. Some of the former organizations still remain active for other purposes.

Country/Territory	Former pageant(s)	New pageant	Franchise since
Albania	Miss Albania (2002–2005)	Miss Universe Albania	2006
Argentina	Miss Argentina (1952–2003)	Miss Universo Argentina	2006
Australia	Miss Australia (1952–2000)	Miss Universe Australia	2004
Bahamas	Miss Bahamas (1963–2001; 2010–2015); Miss Bahamas Universe (2002–2009); Miss Universe Bahamas (2016–2017)	Miss Bahamas Queen	2018
Brazil	Miss Brasil (1952–2011); Miss Brasil Universo (2012–2014); Miss Brasil Be Emotion (2015–2019); U Miss Brasil (2020)	Miss Universo Brasil	2021
Bulgaria	Miss Bulgaria (1991–2009); Miss Universe Bulgaria (2012–2014); Miss National Team Bulgaria (2015–2016)	Miss Bulgaria Universe	2017
Cambodia	Miss Cambodia (2017–2018)	Miss Universe Cambodia	2019
Canada	Miss Toronto (1952–1958); Miss Dominion of Canada (1959–1977); Miss Canada (1978–1992); Canadian Search for Miss Universe (1993–2002)	Miss Universe Canada	2003
Colombia	Señorita Colombia (1958–1980; 1983–2019); Reina de Reinas (1981–1982)	Miss Universe Colombia	2020
Czech Republic	Miss Československo (1993); Miss České republiky (1994–2004); Česká Miss (2005–2024)	Miss Universe Czechia	2025
Denmark	Frøken Danmark (1952–2013); Miss Universe Denmark (2013–2015); Face of Denmark (2015–2016); Miss Denmark (2018–2024)	Miss Universe Denmark	2025
Ecuador	Miss Ecuador (1955–1960, 1962, 1967–1969, 1971–1972, 1974–2023)	Miss Universe Ecuador	2024
Egypt	Miss Egypt (1987–2011, 2014)	Miss Universe Egypt	2017
El Salvador	Miss El Salvador (1954–2005); Nuestra Belleza El Salvador (2006–2016); Reinado de El Salvador (2017–2022)	Miss El Salvador	2023
Finland	Suomen Neito (1952–1955)	Miss Finland	1960
France	Miss Cinémonde (1953–1954; 1957; 1968–1969); Miss France (1963; 1965–1967; 1971–1985; 1987–2002; 2004−2025); Miss France Outre-Mer (1986); Miss France Univers — Comité Miss France de Paris (2003)	Miss Universe France	2026
Germany	Miss Germany (1952–1999); Miss Deutschland (2000–2007); Miss Universe Deutschland (2008); Miss Germany Universe (2009–2016)	Miss Universe Germany	2017
Ghana	Miss Ghana (1991–1998)	Miss Universe Ghana	1999
Great Britain	Holiday Princess of Great Britain (1952); Miss England (1955–1960); Miss England, Miss Scotland, & Miss Wales (1961–1990); Miss United Kingdom (1991); Miss British Isles (1992); Miss Great Britain (1993–1999); Miss Great Britain Universe (2000); Miss United Kingdom Universe (2005–2008)	Miss Universe Great Britain	2009
Greece	Star Hellas (1952–2018)	Star GS Hellas	2021
Guyana	Miss British Guiana (1956–1965); Miss Guyana (1966–1999)	Miss Universe Guyana	2002
Haiti	Miss Haiti (1960–1989); Miss Haiti Univers (2010–2015)	Miss Haiti	2016
Honduras	Miss Honduras (1954–1955); Señorita Honduras (1967–2002)	Miss Honduras Universe	2007
Iceland	Ungfrú Ísland (1956–2009); Miss Universe Iceland (2016–2022)	Ungfrú Ísland	2023
India	Femina Miss India (1952–2009); I Am She (2010–2012); Miss Diva (2013–2024)	Miss Universe India	2024
Indonesia	Ratu Pariwisata Indonesia (1974); Ratu Indonesia (1975–1977); Andy's Beauty Miss Indonesia (1980–1982); Puteri Indonesia (1995–2022)	Miss Universe Indonesia	2023
Ireland	Miss Ireland (1961–2001)	Miss Universe Ireland	2002
Israel	Miss Israel (1952–2021)	Miss Universe Israel	2024
Italy	Miss Italia (1952–1999); The Miss for Miss Universe (2000–2004)	Miss Universo Italia	2005
Japan	Miss Japan (1952–1997)	Miss Universe Japan	1998
Kenya	Miss Kenya (1987–2002)	Miss Universe Kenya	2004
Lithuania	Miss Lithuania (2012–2014)	Miss Universe Lithuania	2019
Malta	Miss Malta (1968–2001)	Miss Universe Malta	2016
Mauritius	Miss Mauritius (1975–2015)	Miss Maurice	2016
Mexico	Señorita México (1952–1993); Nuestra Belleza México (1994–2016); Mexicana Universal (2017–2023)	Miss Universe Mexico	2024
Myanmar	Miss Burma (1959–1962)	Miss Universe Myanmar	2013
Nepal	Miss Nepal (2017–2019)	Miss Universe Nepal	2020
Netherlands	Miss Holland (1956–1990); Miss Universe Nederland (1991–2008); Miss Nederland (2009–2023)	Miss Universe Netherlands	2024
New Zealand	Miss New Zealand (1954–2003)	Miss Universe New Zealand	2006
Nicaragua	Miss Nicaragua (1955–2023)	Miss Universe Nicaragua	2024
Nigeria	Miss Nigeria (1964); Most Beautiful Girl in Nigeria (1987–2022)	Miss Universe Nigeria	2023
Norway	Frøken Norge (1952–2010)	Miss Norway	2012
Panama	Miss Panamá (1952–1954, 1964–1967, 1970–1971, 1973–1987); Señorita Panamá (1990–2010); Miss Panamá (2011–2015); Señorita Panamá (2016–2021); Miss Universe Panama (2022–2023)	Señorita Panamá	2024
Paraguay	Miss Paraguay (1957–2001)	Nuestra Belleza Paraguay	2004
Philippines	Miss Philippines (1952–1963); Binibining Pilipinas (1964–2019)	Miss Universe Philippines	2020
Poland	Miss Polonia (1958–2018)	Miss Polski	2019
Portugal	Miss Portugal (1960–2002); Miss Universo Portugal (2011, 2014–2017); Miss República Portuguesa (2018–2021)	Miss Portugal	2022
Puerto Rico	Miss Puerto Rico (1952–2008)	Miss Universe Puerto Rico	2009
Romania	Miss Romania (1991–1998)	Miss Universe Romania	2009
Russia	Miss Russia Universe (1994–1995; 2004–2006); Miss USSR (1996); Miss Russia (1997–2003)	Miss Russia	2007
Slovakia	Miss České a Slovenské Republiky (1994); Miss Slovensko (1995–1998); Miss Slovenskej Republiky (1999–2022)	Miss Universe Slovakia	2023
South Africa	Miss Golden Jubilee (1952–1953); Miss Hibiscus Queen (1960–1968); Miss Republic of South Africa (1975–1981); Miss South Africa (1982–1984); Miss Universe South Africa (1995–1997) Miss South Africa (1998-2024)	African Beauty International	2025
South Korea	Miss Korea (1954–2015); Miss Universe Korea (2016–2017)	Miss Queen Korea	2018
Spain	Miss Spain (1960–2012); Be Miss Universe Spain (2013–2019)	Nuestra Belleza España	2020
Sweden	Fröken Sverige (1952–2004); Nya Fröken Sverige (2006)	Miss Universe Sweden	2009
Switzerland	Miss Switzerland (1953–2013); Miss Universe Switzerland (2014, 2016); Miss Switzerland (2018)	Miss Universe Switzerland	2022
Thailand	Miss Thailand (1954, 1965–1973, 1984–1999); Miss Thailand Universe (1974–1983)	Miss Universe Thailand	2000
Ukraine	Miss Ukraine (1995–2005)	Miss Ukraine Universe	2006
United States Virgin Islands	Miss Virgin Islands (1961–1978); Miss US Virgin Islands (1979–2015)	Miss Universe US Virgin Islands	2016
Vietnam	Người đẹp Hà Nội (2004); Hoa khôi Hà Nội/Miss Vietnam Universe (2005); Hoa hậu Hoàn vũ Việt Nam (2008–2022)	Miss Universe Vietnam	2023

== Inactive entrants ==
=== Former entities ===
Country	Debut	Participations	Years competed	National title	Placements	Best placement	First placed	Last placed	Notes
Czechoslovakia	1970	4	1970; 1990–1992	1970: Dívka Roku Československa; 1990–1992: Miss Československo	2	Top 15/10: Kristina Hanazalová (1970); Jana Hronková (1990)	1970: Kristina Hanazalová (Top 15)	1990: Jana Hronková (Top 10)	Split into Czech Republic and Slovak Republic in 1993. Both joined the pageant in 1993 and 1994 respectively.
Saint Christopher-Nevis-Anguilla	1977	3	1977; 1979; 1981	Miss St. Kitts & Nevis					Competed as the island territory of Saint Kitts. Split into Saint Kitts and Nevis and Anguilla in 1979, Saint Kitts and Nevis later got independence in 1983. Both Anguilla and St. Kitts & Nevis have yet to join the pageant.
Serbia and Montenegro	2003	4	2003–2006	2003: Miss Yugoslavia; 2004–2006: Miss Serbia and Montenegro	1	3rd runner-up: Sanja Papić (2003)	2003: Sanja Papić (3rd runner-up)	2003: Sanja Papić (3rd runner-up)	In June 2006, split into Montenegro and Serbia after declaring their independence from each other and joined the pageant independently a year later. Kosovo, a disputed territory by Serbia, joined in 2008.
Southern Rhodesia	1961	1	1961	Miss Rhodesia					Part of the Federation of Rhodesia and Nyasaland which consisted of Southern Rhodesia, Northern Rhodesia, and Nyasaland. The federation was later split into Rhodesia (later renamed Zimbabwe), Zambia, and Malawi in 1964. Zambia and Zimbabwe both joined the pageant in both 1995 & 1994 respectively. Malawi still has yet to join.
Soviet Union	1990	2	1990–1991	Miss USSR	1	2nd runner-up: Yulia Lemigova (1991)	1991: Yulia Lemigova (2nd runner-up)	1991: Yulia Lemigova (2nd runner-up)	After the break-up competed as Commonwealth of Independent States (1992) and 13 former member states joined the pageant: Estonia (1993); Russia (1994); Ukraine (1995); Georgia (2004); Latvia (2005); Kazakhstan (2006); Lithuania (2012); Azerbaijan (2013); Armenia and Kyrgyzstan (2018); Belarus, Moldova, and Uzbekistan (2024). Tajikistan and Turkmenistan have yet to join.
Yugoslavia	1968	15	1968–1970; 1974–1977; 1984–1985; 1991; 1998–2002	Miss Yugoslavia	3	Top 15/10: Daliborka Stojšić (1968); Nataša Kosir (1969); Natasha Pavlovich (1991)	1968: Daliborka Stojšić (Top 15)	1991: Natasha Pavlovich (Top 10)	Socialist Federal Republic of Yugoslavia was dissolved in April 1992. Former member states Croatia, North Macedonia, and Slovenia joined the pageant in 1997, 2024, and 2001, respectively. The new Federal Republic of Yugoslavia competed until 2002, when it was renamed Serbia & Montenegro. Bosnia & Herzegovina has yet to join.

=== Geographical region ===
Region	Debut	Participations	Years competed	National title	Placements	Best placement	First placed	Last placed	Notes
(Trust Territory of the Pacific Islands) Micronesia	1975	1	1975	Miss Micronesia					Geographical region in the Pacific Ocean consisting many archipelagos. The delegate in that year was from the Northern Mariana Islands. After the territory's status referendum in 1975, Northern Mariana Islands began competing as the territory itself individually the following year.
(British West Indies) West Indies	1954	3	1954–1955; 1958	Miss British West Indies					Competed as individual islands since 1962 when the West Indies Federation collapsed and many British colonies in the Caribbean Sea had been gained independence from the United Kingdom. In 1954, the delegate was from Jamaica. In 1955 and 1958, the delegates were from the island of Trinidad. Jamaica joined the pageant in 1961 and Trinidad (later renamed Trinidad & Tobago) joined in 1963.

=== Regional organization ===
Organization	Debut	Participations	Years competed	National title	Placements	Best placement	First placed	Last placed	Notes
CIS	1992	1	1992	Miss Commonwealth Countries; Miss Stran Sodruzhestva					Regional organization composed of former Soviet Republics (except Estonia, Latvia and Lithuania) during the breakup of the Soviet Union. The former Soviet Republics, now independent countries, started to competed individually the following year onward.

=== Territories ===
Denmark

Constituent country	Debut	Participations	Years competed	National title	Placements	Best placement	First placed	Last placed	Notes
Greenland	1987	4	1987–1990	Miss Greenland					

France

Overseas Department	Debut	Participations	Years competed	National title	Placements	Best placement	First placed	Last placed	Notes
French Guiana	1977	3	1977; 1983–1984	Miss Guyane (Miss French Guiana)					Now competes in Miss France.
Overseas Collectivity	Debut	Participations	Years competed	National title	Placements	Best placement	First placed	Last placed	Notes
French Polynesia	1962	7	1962; 1977–1981; 1985	Miss Tahiti	2	Top 12: Thilda Raina Fuller (1980); Tatiana Teraiamano (1981)	1980: Thilda Raina Fuller (Top 12)	1981: Tatiana Teraiamano (Top 12)	Now competes in Miss France. Competed as Tahiti in the pageant.
New Caledonia	1982	1	1982	Miss Nouvelle-Calédonie (Miss New Caledonia)					Sui Generis (special) collectivity of France. Now competes at Miss France.

Japan

Prefecture	Debut	Participations	Years competed	National title	Placements	Best placement	First placed	Last placed	Notes
Okinawa	1963	6	1963–1968	Miss Okinawa					Under US administration from 1945 until 1972, now part of Japan. Competing at Miss Japan (now Miss Universe Japan) since 1972.

Netherlands

Constituent country	Debut	Participations	Years competed	National title	Placements	Best placement	First placed	Last placed	Notes
Sint Maarten	1976	6	1976–1977; 1980; 1982; 2000; 2006	Miss Sint Maarten					Competed as Saint Martin in 2000 and 2006.

New Zealand

Free Associated State	Debut	Years competed	National Title	Entrants	Best placement	Last placed	Notes
Cook Islands	1983	1983–1986; 1991–1992; 1994–1996; 1999	Miss Cook Islands	10			

South Africa

Bantustan	Debut	Participations	Years competed	National title	Placements	Best placement	First placed	Last placed	Notes
Bophuthatswana	1979	1	1979	Miss Republic of South Africa					Internationally unrecognized "independent" Bantustans established by South African apartheid; reintegrated into South Africa in 1994.
Transkei	1979	4	1979; 1981–1983	Miss Republic of South Africa					Internationally unrecognized "independent" Bantustans established by South African apartheid; reintegrated into South Africa in 1994.

United Kingdom

Constituent country	Debut	Participations	Years competed	National title	Placements	Best placement	First placed	Last placed	Notes
England	1955	34	1955–1962; 1964–1990	Miss England	19	1st runner-up: Brenda Blackler (1964)	1955: Margaret Rowe (Top 15)	1983: Karen Moore (4th runner-up)	Now compete at Miss Universe Great Britain.
Scotland	1961	29	1961–1986; 1988–1990	Miss Scotland	5	1st runner-up: Linda Gallagher (1980)	1961: Susan Jones (Top 15)	1980: Linda Gallagher (1st runner-up)	Now compete at Miss Universe Great Britain.
Wales	1961	30	1961–1990	Miss Wales	5	1st runner-up: Rosemarie Frankland (1961); Helen Morgan (1974)	1961: Rosemarie Frankland (1st runner-up)	1979: Janet Beverly Hobson (Top 12)	Now compete at Miss Universe Great Britain.
Overseas Territory	Debut	Participations	Years competed	National title	Placements	Best placement	First placed	Last placed	Notes
Bermuda	1965	27	1965–1985; 1988–1992; 1997	Miss Bermuda	1	1st runner-up: Gina Swainson (1979)	1979: Gina Swainson (1st runner-up)	1979: Gina Swainson (1st runner-up)	Competed in Miss Universe United Kingdom from 2005-2006.

United States

State	Debut	Participations	Years competed	National title	Placements	Best placement	First placed	Last placed	Notes
Alaska	1952	7	1952–1958	Miss Alaska Universe	1	Top 15: Martha Lehmann (1957)	1957: Martha Lehmann (Top 15)	1957: Martha Lehmann (Top 15)	Competing at the Miss USA pageant since 1959.
Hawaii	1952	5	1952–1953; 1957–1959	Miss Hawaii Universe	2	1st runner-up: Elza Kananionapua Edsman (1952)	1952: Elza Kananionapua Edsman (1st runner-up)	1958: Geri Hoo (2nd runner-up)	Competing at the Miss USA pageant since 1960.
Unincorporated Territory	Debut	Participations	Years competed	National title	Placements	Best placement	First placed	Last placed	Notes
American Samoa	1975	4	1975–1978	Miss American Samoa					Competed as Samoa in the pageant.
Guam	1966	44	1966–1995; 1998; 2000; 2008–2014; 2016–2019	Miss Guam	2	1st runner-up: Patty Chong Kerkos (1982)	1970: Hilary Best (Top 15)	1982: Patty Chong Kerkos (1st runner-up)	Won Miss Congeniality in 1970, 1985, 1986, 1988; Won Miss Press in 1982.
Northern Mariana Islands	1976	27	1976–1999; 2001–2002; 2006	Miss Marianas					Competed as Northern Marianas in the pageant.

=== Others ===
The following list consists of countries and territories that have not sent a delegate to the pageant since 2024, or no longer hold the Miss Universe franchise, but participated at least once in the past:

Country/Territory	Debut	Participations	Years competed	National title	Placements	Best placement	First placed	Last placed	Notes
Angola	1998	26	1998–2019; 2022–2025	Miss Angola Universo	4	Winner: Leila Lopes (2011)	2003: Ana José Sebastião (Top 15)	2011: Leila Lopes (Winner)	Won Miss Congeniality in 2015; Gold winner of Voice for Change 2023
Antigua and Barbuda	1977	10	1977; 1979; 2001–2008	Miss Antigua & Barbuda					Won Miss Congeniality in 2003. Competed as Antigua until 1979.
Austria	1953	44	1953; 1957; 1959–1990; 1992–1993; 1999; 2004; 2013–2017	Miss Austria	7	1st runner-up: Eva Maria Düringer (1977)	1953: Lore Felger (Top 16)	1977: Eva Maria Düringer (1st runner-up)	Won Miss Photogenic in 1965.
Azerbaijan	2013	1	2013	Miss Universe Azerbaijan	0				
Barbados	1976	18	1976–1979; 1984–1987; 1999; 2003–2005; 2007; 2016–2020	Miss Universe Barbados	0				
Bahrain	2021	4	2021–2024	Miss Universe Bahrain	0				
Bhutan	2022	1	2022	Miss Bhutan	0				
Bulgaria	1991	31	1991–1998; 2000–2007; 2009; 2012–2025	Miss Universe Bulgaria	0				
Republic of China / Taiwan / Chinese Taipei	1961	18	1961–1962; 1964; 1988–1992; 1994–2001; 2003–2004	Miss Chinese Taipei	3	3rd runner-up: Helen Liu (1962)	1961: Wang Li-Ling (Top 15)	1964: Lana Yi Yu (4th runner-up)	Competed as Republic of China until 1991, China / Taiwan in 1992, Taiwan (R.O.C.) from 1994 to 1999, Chinese Taipei between 2000 and 2004.
Côte d'Ivoire	1986	3	1986; 2024–2025	Miss Côte d'Ivoire	1	4th runner-up: Olivia Yacé (2025)	2025: Olivia Yacé (4th runner-up)	2025: Olivia Yacé (4th runner-up)	Won Miss Universe Africa and Oceania (Resigned) in 2025
Cyprus	1973	30	1973–1974; 1981; 1983–1987; 1992–2012; 2024	Miss Universe Cyprus	1	Top 10: Demetra Eleftheriou (2002)	2002: Demetra Eleftheriou (Top 10)	2002: Demetra Eleftheriou (Top 10)	
Dahomey	1962	1	1962	Miss Bénin					Currently known as Benin.
Dominica	1985	1	1985	Miss Dominica					
Eritrea	2024	1	2024	Miss Eritrea	0				
Fiji	1979	3	1979; 1981; 2024	Miss Fiji	0				
Gabon	2012	4	2012–2015	Miss Gabon					
Gambia	1983	4	1983–1986	Miss Gambia	0				Won Miss Congeniality in 1983.
Georgia	2004	15	2004–2012; 2014–2019	Miss Georgia	0				
Gibraltar	1981	9	1981; 1983–1986; 1988–1990; 2024	Miss Universe Gibraltar	0				Competed in Miss Universe United Kingdom from 2005 to 2006. Competed in Miss Universe Great Britain 2019. Won Miss Congeniality in 1984.
Grenada	1964	1	1964	Miss Grenada World					
Indonesia	1974	29	1974–1977; 1980; 1982–1983; 1995–1996; 2005–2020; 2022–2025	Miss Universe Indonesia	8	Top 10: Frederika Alexis Cull (2019)	2005: Artika Sari Devi (Top 15)	2020: Ayu Maulida (Top 21)	Won Best in National Costume in 2014; Won Best Skin Award in 2025
Iran	2024	1	2024	Miss Universe Persia	0				Competes as Persia in the pageant.
Latina	2025	1	2025	Miss Universe Latina	1	Top 30: Yamilex Hernández (2025)	2025: Yamilex Hernández (Top 30)	2025: Yamilex Hernández (Top 30)	
Laos	2017	9	2017–2025	Miss Universe Laos	1	Top 16: Payengxa Lor (2022)	2022: Payengxa Lor (Top 16)	2022: Payengxa Lor (Top 16)	Won Best National Costume in 2018; Fanvote winner in 2022
Lesotho	1978	1	1978	Face of Lesotho					
Liberia	1974	4	1974–1977	Miss Liberia					
Luxembourg	1959	27	1959–1976; 1984–1986; 1988–1989; 1991–1994	Miss Luxembourg					
Madagascar	1961	1	1961	Miss Madagascar					
Malaysia	1962	62	1962; 1964–2020; 2022–2025	Miss Universe Malaysia	2	Top 15: Josephine Lena Wong (1970)	1970: Josephine Lena Wong (Top 15)	2024: Sandra Lim (Top 30)	Competed as Malaya in 1962
Maldives	2024	1	2024	Miss Universe Maldives	0				
Mauritius	1975	38	1975–1977; 1979; 1989–1995; 1997–2000; 2002–2003; 2005–2025	Miss Estrella Mauritius	0				
Morocco	1957	9	1957; 1960–1963; 1966; 1975; 1978; 2021	Miss Maroc	1	Top 15: Jacqueline Bonilla (1957)	1957: Jacqueline Bonilla (Top 15)	1957: Jacqueline Bonilla (Top 15)	
Nepal	2017	9	2017–2025	Miss Universe Nepal	2	Top 10: Manita Devkota (2018)	2018: Manita Devkota (Top 10)	2023: Jane Dipika Garrett (Top 20)	
New Hebrides	1978	1	1978	Miss Vanuatu					Currently known as Vanuatu.
North Macedonia	2024	1	2024	Miss Universe North Macedonia					
Palestine	2025	1	2025	Miss Palestine	1	Top 30: Nadeen Ayoub (2025)	2025: Nadeen Ayoub (Top 30)	2025: Nadeen Ayoub (Top 30)	
Papua New Guinea	1976	10	1976–1980; 1982–1986	Miss Papua New Guinea					
Rwanda	2025	1	2025	Miss Universe Rwanda	1	Top 30: Solange Keita (2025)	2025: Solange Keita (Top 30)	2025: Solange Keita (Top 30)	
Samoa	1981	7	1981–1986; 2024	Miss Universe Samoa	0				Competed as Western Samoa until 1986.
Senegal	1974	5	1974; 1985; 1987; 2024–2025	Miss Senegal	0				
Singapore	1954	63	1954; 1958; 1962; 1966–2025	Miss Singapore Universe	3	Top 10: Marion Nicole Teo (1987)	1983: Kathie Lee Lee Beng (Top 12)	2021: Nandita Banna (Top 16)	
Slovenia	2001	16	2001–2011; 2013–2014; 2016–2017; 2025	Miss Universe Slovenia	1	Top 15: Tjaša Kokalj (2007)	2007: Tjaša Kokalj (Top 15)	2007: Tjaša Kokalj (Top 15)	
Somalia	2024	1	2024	Miss Universe Somalia	0				
Saint Vincent and the Grenadines	1964	8	1964; 1978–1979; 1989–1991; 2004; 2006	Miss St. Vincent and the Grenadines					Competed as Saint Vincent until 1979.
Seychelles	1995	2	1995; 2022	Miss Seychelles					
Swaziland	1993	2	1993–1994	Miss Swaziland					Currently known as Eswatini.
Thailand	1954	61	1954; 1959; 1965–1966; 1968–1969; 1971–2025	Miss Universe Thailand	16	Winner: Apasra Hongsakula (1965); Porntip Nakhirunkanok (1988)	1965: Apasra Hongsakula (Winner)	2025: Praveenar Singh (1st runner-up)	Won Best in National Costume in 1969, 1988, 2005, 2008, 2010, 2015; Won Miss Congeniality in 1959; Won Miss Photogenic in 1990, 2009, 2010; Fanvote winner in 2016
Turkey	1952	64	1952–1953; 1956–1957; 1959; 1961–1976; 1978–1984; 1986–1999; 2001–2006; 2008–2019; 2021–2022; 2024–2025	Miss Universe Turkiye	3	Top 10: Jülide Ateş (1990)	1953: Ayten Akyol (Top 16)	2012: Çağıl Özge Özkul (Top 16)	Competes as Türkiye in the pageant since 2022. Won Miss Congeniality in 1998, 2025.
United Arab Emirates	2024	2	2024–2025	Miss Universe United Arab Emirates	0				
Vietnam	2004	18	2004–2005; 2008–2009; 2011–2013; 2015–2025	Miss Universe Vietnam	6	Top 5: H'Hen Niê (2018)	2008: Nguyễn Thùy Lâm (Top 15)	2024: Nguyễn Cao Kỳ Duyên (Top 30)	Fanvote winner in 2020, 2021.
Zambia	1995	11	1995; 1999; 2005–2007; 2009–2010; 2017–2018; 2024–2025	Miss Universe Zambia	0				
Zimbabwe	1994	11	1994; 1996–1998; 2000–2001; 2023–2025	Miss Universe Zimbabwe	3	Top 10: Corinne Crewe (2000)	2000: Corinne Crewe (Top 10)	2025: Lyshanda Moyas (Top 30)	

== Unsuccessful participations ==
The list does not include withdrawals for personal reasons.

Year	Country/Territory	Contestant	Reason
1955	Egypt	Gladir Leopardi	Due to the revolution in Egypt, authorities recalled the contestant back. Returned in 1987.
1957	Holland	Corine Rottschäfer	Won Miss Europe, already title-holder. Disqualified.
1959	United Arab Republic	Leila Saad	Withdrew. Authorities would not compete with Israel.
1963	England	Susan Pratt	Contestant was involved in an auto accident before the final night.
1980	Namibia	Bernice Tembo	Since the country was a South African mandate, the contestant could not obtain a visa to enter South Korea.
1980	South Africa	Sandra McCrystal	Due to political reasons, contestant could not obtain a visa to enter in South Korea, as well as the contestants from the bantustans and the mandates.
1981	Hong Kong	Irene Lo	Forced to withdraw. Contestant lied about her age.
1982	Cyprus	Sylvia Spanias Nitsa	Disqualified after being discovered that she was actually a British citizen from London, England.
1984	Bahamas	Pamela Lois Parker	Pulled out of the pageant in response to South Africa being allowed to send a representative and participate in the pageant despite being under apartheid.
1985	Namibia	Alice Pfeiffer	Could not participate since the country was the mandate of South Africa until late 1990.
1985	South Africa	Andrea Stelzer	Could not participate between 1985 and 1994 due to practice of apartheid.
1987	Scotland	Eileen Catterson	Was disqualified for being under age.
1992	Hong Kong	Amy Kwok	Disqualified because the contestant was an American citizen.
1997	Indonesia		No permission from the government. Returned in 2005.
1997	Nicaragua	Luz María Sánchez Herdocia	Sponsor TV station went bankrupt.
1997	Western Samoa	Mary-Jane Moe Mckibbin	Quit after two days of competing.
1999	Guam	Tisha Elaine Heflin	Disqualified after she disclosed that she was pregnant, which was against pageant rules.
2000	Turkey	Cansu Dere	Withdrew as it was strictly forbidden for Turkish citizens to enter Cyprus, the host nation.
2001	Mozambique	Nica Gemo	Sponsor wouldn't allow contestant's mother to accompany her, disqualified.
2002	Lebanon	Christina Sawaya	Withdrew as she refused to compete with Israel also participating.
2002	Mayotte		Disqualified as Mayotte also competes for Miss France
2003	Iceland	Manuela Ósk Harðardóttir	Withdrew due to suffering from dehydration in the preliminary stage. Stayed until the pageant was over.
2003	Russia	Maria Smirnova	Posed for Playboy. Disqualified.
2009	Turks and Caicos	Jewel Selver	Withdrew a night before the final event due to dehydration. Later disclosed the contestant was pregnant.
2013	Albania	Fioralba Dizdari	Withdrew out of respect after Kosovo's delegate was refused entry into the host country.
2013	Kosovo	Mirjeta Shala	Denied entry. Host country does not recognize Kosovo as an independent state.
2015	Slovenia	Ana Haložan	Prior to the preliminary competition, Slovenia's delegate fell unconscious in the hotel bathroom and got hurt. She was rushed to the hospital and later withdrew. She was given a tribute on the final night.
2016	Gabon		Pageant was postponed then later cancelled due to the political turmoil and unrest in the country that followed after the general elections.
2021	United Arab Emirates		Due to cancellation of their national pageant from undisclosed reasons, the UAE withdrew at the last minute.
2022	Latvia	Kate Alexeeva	Tested positive for COVID-19 prior to arriving at the event.
2022	Norway	Ida Anette Hauan	Tested positive for COVID-19 prior to the final telecast.
2024	Panama	Italy Mora	Disqualified after leaving the hotel without permission from the Organization.
