= Gaylyne Ayugi =

Kenyan model

Gaylyne geegee Ayugi
- Born: 1994 (age 31–32); Nairobi, Kenya
- Occupation: Model
- Beauty pageant titleholder
- Title: Miss Universe Kenya 2014
- Hair colour: Black
- Eye colour: Black
- Major competitions: Miss Universe Kenya 2014 (Winner); Miss Universe 2014 (Unplaced)

Gaylyne Ayugi (born 1994) is a Kenyan model and beauty pageant titleholder who was crowned as Miss Universe Kenya 2014 and represented the country at the Miss Universe 2014 pageant.

== Early life ==
Ayugi was born and grew up in Nairobi. Currently, she is a journalism student at Zetech College in Nairobi. Additionally, she is a dancer and a fashion model in her country.

== Pageantry ==
=== Miss Universe Kenya 2014 ===
According to the new national director in Nairobi, Maria Sarungi Tsehai who led the Miss Universe Tanzania Organization. The Miss Universe Kenya will be returned for the Miss Universe 2014. in the first time after 8 years absent at the pageant, Ayugi Gaylyne getting the new title of Miss Kenya for Miss Universe 2014. She was crowned in Nairobi, Kenya on November 8, 2014.

=== Miss Universe 2014 ===
Ayugi competed at Miss Universe 2014 but did not place.

Awards and achievements
Preceded by Rachel Marete	Miss Universe Kenya; 2014	Succeeded by Mary Esther Were
