= Winfrida Dominic =

Tanzanian model

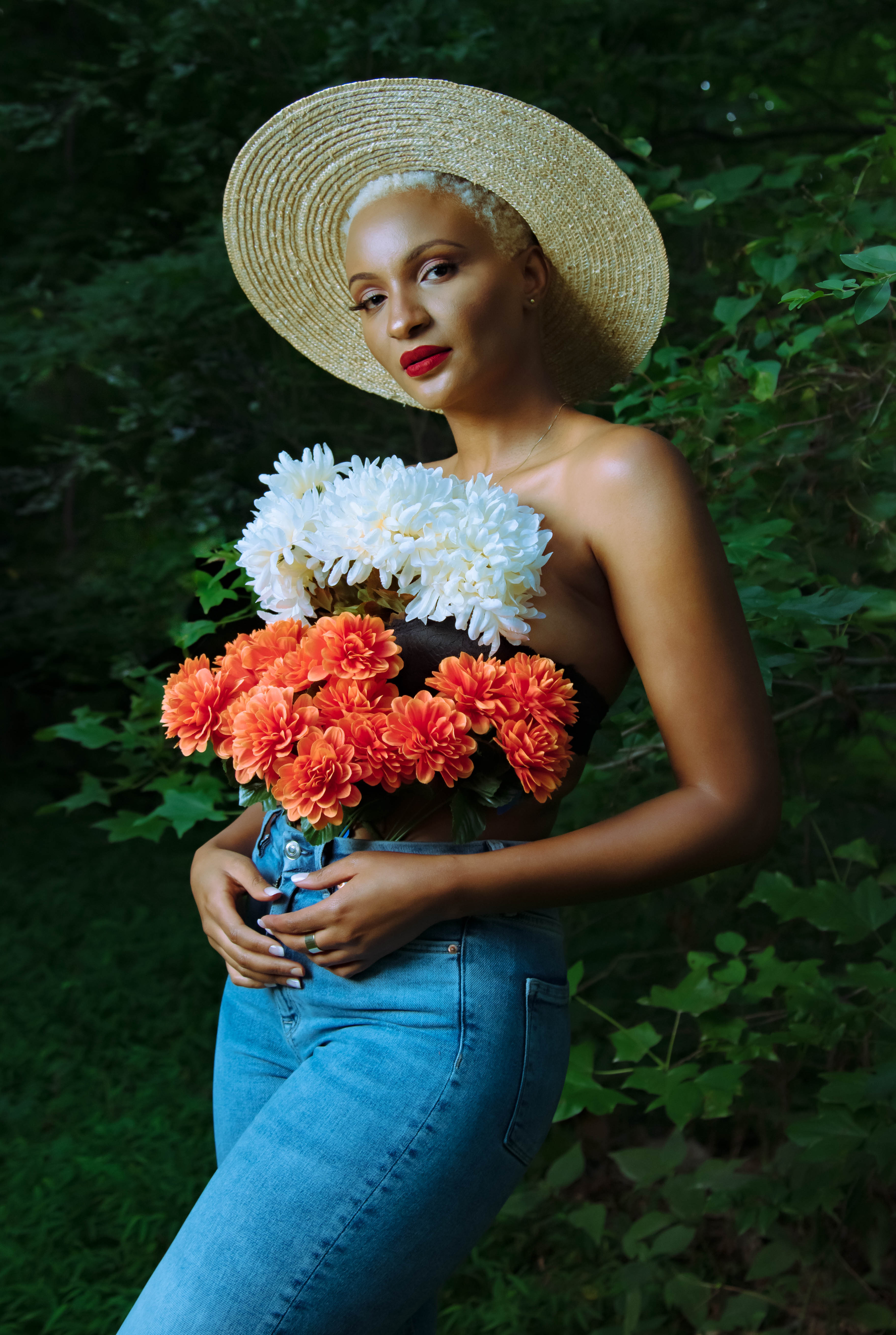
- Miss Universe Tanzania 2012
- Born: Winfrida Dominic; 1993 (age 32–33); Dar es Salaam, Tanzania
- Height: 1.75 m (5 ft 9 in)
- Beauty pageant titleholder
- Title: Miss Universe Tanzania 2012
- Major competitions: Miss Universe Tanzania 2012 (Winner); Miss Universe 2012 (Unplaced)

Winfrida Dominic (born 1993) is a Tanzanian model and beauty pageant titleholder who was crowned Miss Universe Tanzania 2012 and represented her country at the 2012 Miss Universe. She was also supposed to represent Tanzania in Miss Supranational pageant but withdrew at the last moment due to not being able to secure a visa for Poland.

== Miss Universe Tanzania 2012 & Miss Universe 2012 ==
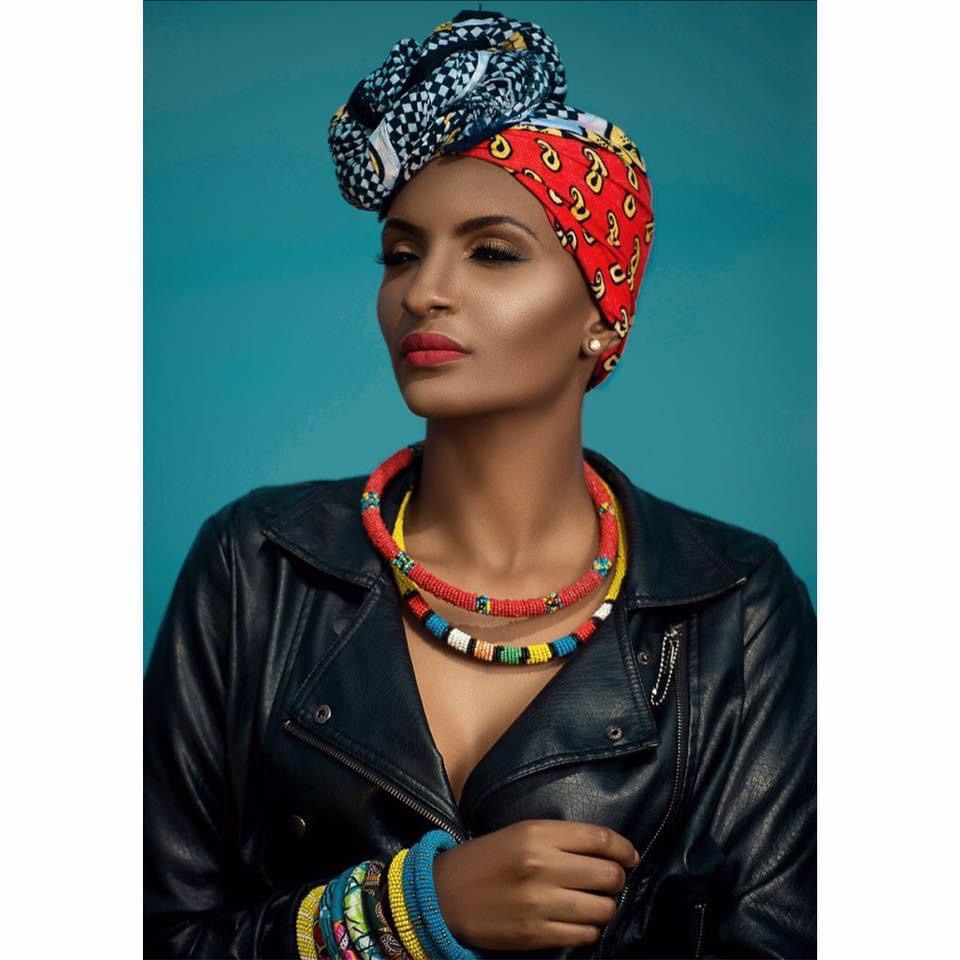

Winfrida Dominic won the crown of Miss Universe Tanzania 2012 at the National Museum Hall in Dar es Salaam on Friday night 29 June 2012. Bahati Chando won the Miss Earth Tanzania 2012 title and Dorice Mollel won the Miss Tourism Queen International Tanzania 2012 title.

Awards and achievements
Preceded by Nelly Kamwelu	Miss Universe Tanzania; 2012	Succeeded by Betty Boniphace
