= Miss Universo Italia 2007 =

- Winner: Valentina Massi

The Miss Universo Italia 2007 pageant was held on April 21, 2007. The chosen winner represented Italy at the Miss Universe 2007.

== Results ==
- Miss Universo Italia 2007 : Valentina Massi
