= Valentina Massi =

Italian model (born 1983)

- Born: Valentina Massi; 23 April 1983 (age 43); Forlimpopoli; Emilia-Romagna, Italy
- Height: 5 ft 9 in (1.75 m)
- Beauty pageant titleholder
- Title: Miss Sorriso Romagna 2000; Miss Mondo Romagna 2006; Miss Model 2006; Miss Universo Italia 2007
- Hair color: Black
- Eye color: Brown
- Major competitions: • Miss Italia 2000 • Miss Mondo Italia 2006 • Miss Universo Italia 2007 (winner) • Miss Universe 2007

Valentina Massi (born 23 April 1983 in Forlimpopoli, Emilia-Romagna, Italy) is an Italian model and beauty pageant titleholder who the winner of the Miss Universo Italia 2007 pageant that was held at the Teatro Giacosa in Ivrea, Piedmont on 21 April 2007. She represented Italy at the Miss Universe 2007 pageant in Mexico City on 28 May.

In 2000 she entered the Miss Italia pageant where she was a finalist. In 2006 she entered the Miss Mondo Italia pageant (which selects the Italian delegate who will compete at Miss World) as Miss Mondo Romagna. She was a finalist there as well and won the Miss Model national sash.

Valentina stands 5 ft 9 in (1.75 m) and she's a Taurus. She speaks English and French.
