= Zahra Redwood =

Zahra O. Redwood
- Born: Zahra O. Redwood; Jamaica
- Beauty pageant titleholder
- Title: Miss Jamaica Universe 2007
- Major competitions: Miss Jamaica Universe 2007 (Winner); Miss Universe 2007

Zahra O. Redwood (born c. 1985) is a Jamaican model and beauty pageant titleholder who was crowned Miss Jamaica Universe 2007. She is the first Rastafarian to enter and win a beauty pageant in Jamaica and also the first Rastafarian pageant titleholder to represent Jamaica internationally in the Miss Universe 2007 pageant held in Mexico City on 28 May 2007.

In addition to being the first Rastafarian to be crowned a pageant titleholder in Jamaica and to represent Jamaica internationally in the Donald Trump/NBC co-owned Miss Universe pageant, Redwood's win was significant because her crowning on 25 March coincided with the same date as the abolition of the transatlantic slave trade. Redwood was voted Most Congenial by her fellow competitors, and also copped the award for Most Aware, bringing her number of awards on the crowning night to three: Winner, Most Congenial and Most Aware.
