= Miss Universe Kenya =

National beauty pageant competition in Kenya

MUKE
- Formation: 2002; 24 years ago
- Type: Beauty pageant
- Headquarters: Nairobi
- Location: Kenya
- Members: Miss Universe
- Official language: English
- Chairman: Hon Ababu-Terrah Egh

Miss Universe Kenya is a national pageant in Kenya that was first held in 2002, and an annual national contest to choose ambassador for the Miss Universe pageant. Miss Universe Kenya is not related to the previous Miss World Kenya or Miss Kenya contests.

== History ==
The Miss Universe Kenya was held for the first time in 2002, by Beauties of Africa Inc. Since the corporation took over the license in Kenya from Miss Kenya organization, the organization did not set for longer until 2005. In 2014, the new owner bought the brand and joined Maria Sarungi Tsehai ownership. Beginning in 2024, Hon Ababu-Terrah Egh took over the license of Miss Universe Kenya and made it larger event in Kenya.

=== Directorships ===
- Miss Kenya under Ministry of Tourism (1987)
- Beauties of Africa Inc. Andy Abulime (2002)
- Maria Sarungi Tsehai (2014)
- Hon Ababu-Terrah Egh (2024)

== Titleholders ==
- : Declared as Winner
- : Ended as runner-up or top 5/6 qualification
- : Ended as one of the finalists or semifinalists
- : Ended as special awards winner

Year	County	MUKE	Placement at Miss Universe	Special Award(s)	Notes
Hon Ababu-Terrah Egh directorship — a franchise holder to Miss Universe from 2024
2026	Nairobi	Jean Ojiro	TBA		
2025	Did not compete				
2024	Kiambu	Irene Ng'endo	Unplaced		Previously Miss Grand Kenya 2020, and finished as one of the Top 20 semi-finalist at Miss Grand International 2020.
Maria Sarungi Tsehai directorship — a franchise holder to Miss Universe between 2014―2021
Did not compete between 2022—2023
2021	Nairobi	Roshanara Ebrahim	Unplaced		Veteran queen who won Miss World Kenya 2016, but she withdrew at Miss World 2016.
Due to the impact of COVID-19 pandemic, no representative in 2020
2019	Nairobi	Stacy Michuki	Unplaced		
2018	Nairobi	Wabaiya Kariuki	Unplaced		
2017	Did not compete				
2016	Nairobi	Mary Esther Were	Top 6		
2015	Did not compete				
2014	Busia	Gaylyne Ayugi	Unplaced		
Andy Abulime (Beauties of Africa Inc.) directorship — a franchise holder to Miss Universe between 2002―2005
Did not compete between 2006—2013
2005	Nairobi	Rachel Mbuki Marete	Unplaced		
2004	Nairobi	Anita Maina	Unplaced		
2003	Did not compete				
2002	Laikipia	Julie Njeru	Unplaced		
Miss Kenya Organization directorship — a franchise holder to Miss Universe between 1987―1995
Did not compete between 1996—2001
1995	Taita-Taveta	Josephine Wanjiku Mbatia	Unplaced		Miss Kenya 1994 — designated as Miss Kenya Universe 1995 by the Miss Kenya Organization.
Did not compete between 1993—1994
1992	Nairobi	Aisha Wawira Lieberg	Unplaced		Miss Kenya 1990 — designated as Miss Kenya Universe 1992 by the Miss Kenya Organization.
Did not compete between 1988—1991
1987	Mombasa	Susan Waruguru Kahumba	Unplaced		

=== Wins by county ===
County	Titles	Years
Nairobi	7	1992, 2004, 2005, 2016, 2018, 2019, 2021
Kiambu	1	2024
Busia	1	2014
Laikipia	1	2002
Taita-Taveta	1	1995
Mombasa	1	1987

== See also ==
- Miss Kenya
- Miss World Kenya
