= Nale Boniface =

Tanzanian beauty pageant titleholder

- Born: Nale Boniface; 1993 (age 32–33); Dodoma, Tanzania
- Height: 1.78 m (5 ft 10 in)
- Beauty pageant titleholder
- Title: Miss Earth Tanzania 2014; Miss Universe Tanzania 2014 (Replacing - Carolyne Bernard)
- Hair color: Black
- Eye color: Brown
- Major competitions: Miss Universe Tanzania 2014 (1st Runner-up); Miss Earth 2014; Miss Universe 2014 (Unplaced)

Nale Boniface (born 1993) is a Tanzanian model and beauty pageant titleholder who was crowned Miss Earth Tanzania 2014. She represented her country at the Miss Earth 2014 and replaced winner Carolyne Bernard to compete at the Miss Universe 2014 in Doral, Florida.

== Pageantry ==
=== Miss Universe Tanzania 2014 ===
On October 31, 2014, Boniface placed 1st Runner-up at Miss Universe Tanzania 2014 and was automatically awarded Miss Earth Tanzania 2014.

=== Miss Earth 2014 ===
Boniface represented Tanzania at Miss Earth 2014 in Quezon City, Philippines on November 28, 2014.

=== Miss Universe 2014 ===
On December 24, 2014, the grand winner of Miss Universe Carolyne Bernard withdrew from the Miss Universe 2014 pageant after an accident fractured her feet, preventing her from wearing high heels. Nale competed at the Miss Universe 2014 final event.

Awards and achievements
Preceded by Carolyne Bernard	Miss Universe Tanzania; 2014	Succeeded by Lorraine Marriott
Preceded by Clara Noor	Miss Earth Tanzania; 2014	Succeeded by Carolyne Bernard
