= Deise Nunes =

Brazilian model (born 1968)

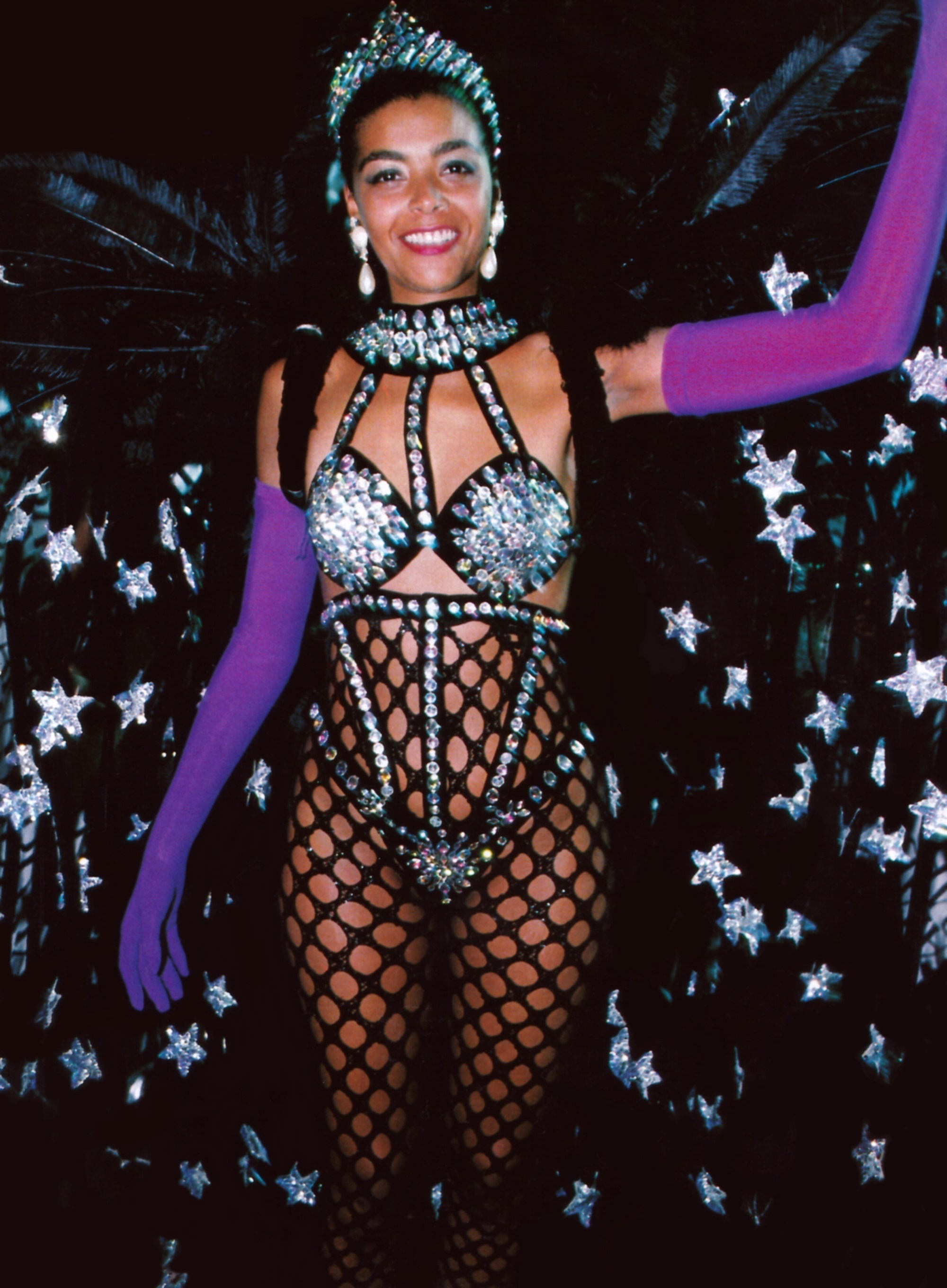
- Nunes in 1994
- Born: Deise Nunes de Souza; March 30, 1968 (age 58); Porto Alegre, Brazil
- Height: 175 cm (69 in)
- Spouse: Lair Ferst
- Children: 2
- Beauty pageant titleholder
- Title: Miss Rio Grande do Sul 1986; Miss Brasil 1986
- Hair color: Dark Brown
- Eye color: Brown
- Major competitions: Miss Brasil 1986 (Winner); Miss Universe 1986 (Top 10)

Deise Nunes de Souza (born 30 March 1968) is a Brazilian model and beauty pageant titleholder. She was the first woman of predominantly African descent to be crowned Miss Brazil.

== Biography ==
Nunes was born in Porto Alegre, Rio Grande do Sul, Brazil, and was educated at Santa Inés College. Her ethnicity is pardo.

In 1977, Nunes was elected Miss Congeniality of her school and in 1984 she became a professional model. She participated in many beauty contests, such as being crowned the Queen of the Rio Grande do Sul Swimming Pools in 1984.

In 1986, in São Paulo, she was the first woman of African descent to be named Miss Brazil. Some members of the Brazilian public caused an outcry at her Miss Brazil win, while Nunes announced that she intended to use her throne to raise awareness about racial prejudice in Brazil. She received the key to the city of Porto Alegre.

After winning Miss Brazil, Nunes participated in the Miss South America contest in Venezuela. She came third place and won the award for best traditional costume. She then placed sixth in the international Miss Universe competition held in Panama City, Panama, in July 1986.

After her beauty pageant career, Nunes established the Deise Nunes Modelling School in Porto Alegre, which prepares models for the fashion industry. Marthina Brandt (Miss Brazil 2015) was one of her students. Nunes has also made appearances on Brazilian television, such as in one of the episodes of the series Tarcísio e Gloria and as a guest judge on Cassino do Chacrinha, both on Rede Globo.

== Personal life ==
She dated the Spanish singer Julio Iglesias and the Brazilian footballer Edson Arantes do Nascimento (Pelé) in 1986. She later married businessman Lair Ferst and they had two children.

Preceded by (Mato Grosso) Márcia Gabrielle	Miss Brasil; 1986	Succeeded by (Federal District (Brazil)) Jacqueline Meirelles
