= Jacqueline Meirelles =

Brazilian model

- Born: Jacqueline Ribeiro Meireles; 15 April 1963 (age 63); Cuiabá, MT
- Modeling information
- Hair color: Blonde
- Eye color: Green
- Agency: L'Equipe - São Paulo

Jacqueline Ribeiro Meirelles (born 15 April 1963) is a Brazilian model, former tv host and beauty pageanttitleholder who won Miss Universo Brasil 1987 and represented her country at Miss Universe 1987 where she won Best National Costume Awards. She was the first delegate from the Distrito Federal, to win an edition of this pageant since the inauguration of the city, on 21 April 1960. Currently, she works as jewel designer, manager and philanthropist.

== Childhood ==
Jacqueline was born 15 April 1963 in Cuiabá, MT, the first daughter of an attorney born in Ceará state and a manager from Minas Gerais. She moved to Distrito Federal seven months old. Before her election at Miss Distrito Federal pageant, in March 1987, she worked in a local bank as a receptionist and conciliated that work with her modelling career.

== Miss Brazil win ==
In March 1987, Jacqueline defeated other 15 contestants in a district pageant for the telecast of Miss Brazil pageant, held on 4 April on Anhembi Convention Pallace and broadcast nationally on SBT.

== Television career ==
After her coronation, Jacqueline was invited to take a role in the permanent cast of popular comedy show A Praça é Nossa, hosted and created by Carlos Alberto de Nóbrega, after his dismissal from Rede Bandeirantes, where he hosted a show called Praça Brasil. At same time, the new Miss Brazil got ready for the Miss Universe 1987, held in Singapore on 26 May and also broadcast by SBT and, worldwide, by American-based network CBS.

Meirelles won the pageant's National Costume Award. It was the last great beauty contest win for the country until SBT's cancellation of Miss Brazil 1990. After that, the beauty pageant faced a lack of interest by the audience for the next decade.

After her reigning ended in 1988, Jacqueline hosted a SBT Wednesday movie session top-watched called Cinema em Casa. In 1989, she moved to Rede Manchete, where acted as co-host of daytime women show Mulher 90 with a future MTV Brasil VJ, Astrid Fontenelle.

She has also acted as a merchandising girl for the shows hosted by Gugu Liberato and invited by the weekly regular program Hebe Camargo, both aired on SBT. On TV Gazeta, appeared regularly on the daytime show Mulheres.

In 1995, Meirelles was a host of a syndicated show called Vivendo com Classe (Living with Class), where she showcased sophisticate automobiles and their modern features.

== Model works ==
Jacqueline began as a professional model in a defunct agency Jet Set, and since 1991 she is exclusive for São Paulo-based firm L'Equipe.

She appeared on the cover of several magazines such as Nova, Cláudia, Minha and Mãe. Also acted in advertising campaigns and TV commercials for Bradesco, SunBlock, the defunct Banco Nacional, Ponto Frio, Itaú, IBM, Avon, Hotel Sofitel, Gelol, Brastemp, Jardim Sul shopping mall, Banco do Brasil, Rexona, Palmolive and others.

== Music career ==
At the end of 1980's, Jacqueline was a backing vocalist for the band Grafitte. Due to Plano Collor freezing private assets and the negative impact on Brazilian economy, the group was ended in 1990.

| Preceded by (Rio Grande do Sul) Deise Nunes de Sousa | Miss Brasil; 1987 | Succeeded by (Santa Catarina (state)) Isabel Cristina Beduschi |
| Preceded by Patrícia Carneiro | Miss Brasília; 1987 | Succeeded by Ana Cláudia Maranhão |
