= Roshanara Ebrahim =

Kenyan model, author, and beauty queen

- Born: 15 October 1993 (age 32); Nairobi, Kenya
- Education: University of Nairobi (LLB)
- Occupations: Model; television presenter
- Height: 1.81 m (5 ft 11 1/2 in)
- Beauty pageant titleholder
- Title: Mr. and Mrs. Universities 2014; Miss World Kenya 2016 (Dethroned) (Note: Ebrahim was originally crowned Miss World Kenya 2016, but was dethroned following a controversy surrounding leaked nude photos of Ebrahim.); Miss Supermodel International Kenya 2018; Miss Universe Kenya 2021
- Years active: Model: 1999–present; Television personality: 2016–present
- Major competitions: Miss World Kenya 2016 (Winner; dethroned); Miss Universe Kenya 2021 (Winner); Miss Universe 2021 (Unplaced)

Roshanara Ebrahim (born 15 October 1993) is a Kenyan TV host, model, author and beauty pageant titleholder who was crowned Miss Universe Kenya 2021. As Miss Universe Kenya, she represented Kenya at Miss Universe 2021. Ebrahim had previously been crowned Mr. and Mrs. Universities 2014, Miss World Kenya 2016 (but was dethroned) and Miss Supermodel International Kenya 2018.

== Personal life ==
=== Early life, family background and education ===
Roshanara was born in Nairobi. She is of Persian-Somali descent, through her Persian father Mahmood Ebrahim, who is from Iran, and Somali mother Fatou Spirou, who grew up in Kenya. Although born in Nairobi, she grew up in Mombasa where her parents relocated to as they were in the gemstone business. In 2005, she attended Light Academy in Nairobi, and in 2006, she began attending Doon International School in Dehradun, Uttarakhand, India. In 2011, she interned at Aga Khan Hospital in Mombasa, Kenya. From 2011 to 2015, she studied international law and legal studies at the University of Nairobi.

Roshanara's brother Zul Ebrahim was the winner of Mr. Mombasa County 2016 and participated in the Mr. World Kenya 2016 contest.

=== Heritage ===
On December 3, 2021, Roshanara revealed her ancestral dna after having taken a MyHeritage DNA test from Miss Universe 2021's official sponsor MyHeritage, an online genealogy platform. According to MyHeritage, Miss Universe Kenya 2021 Roshanara Ebrahim has the most diverse heritage of all Miss Universe 2021 contestants.

The test revealed she is of 34.2% Somali, 33.7% South Asian (including East African), 7% North African, 3.6% West Asian (modern day Iran and Turkic peoples), 10.8%. Middle Eastern (Abrahamic-Semitic - Egypt, Lebanon, Palestine), 4.2% Irish, Scottish, and Welsh, 1% Melanesian (Solomon Islands, Indonesia, New Caledonia), 3.3% Nigerian, 0.9% Sierra Leonian and 1.3% Inuit (Canadian indigenous) heritage.

== Career ==
Roshanara Ebrahim also goes by the nickname Roshanara Love.

=== Modelling ===
==== Early Modeling and varia ====
Roshanara Ebrahim started modelling while she was a student at the University of Nairobi. From November 2012 to December 2014, she was a Strut it Afrika model. In January 2013, she became a Muse Limited director.

==== Professional Modeling and brand ambassador ====
In 2017, she joined Boss Models South Africa in Cape Town, Western Cape, South Africa. She was a Rohto Mentholatum K Ltd. brand ambassador from January 2017 to August 2017, the chief executive officer of World Indigenous Model Search in February 2017.

In 2018, she joined Full Circle Model Management in Cape Town and Ice Models Johannesburg in Johannesburg, Gauteng, South Africa. In the same year, she became an African Grassroot Hoops brand ambassador.

She was commissioned to strut for high-end luxury South African brand Maxhosa in the New York Fashion Week in August, 2019. Gracing the runway with Oluchi Onweagba, Young Paris, Miss Universe 2019 Zozibini Tunzi and Demi-Leigh Tebow, Atandwa Kani from Black Panther, Aminat Ayinde from America’s Next Top Model and other superstars.

==== Zikomo Africa Awards ====
Roshanara Ebrahim was voted by Peoples's choice as Africa's Best Model of the month on December 28, 2021, by the Zambia-based Zikomo Africa Awards.

=== Pageantry ===
==== Mr. and Mrs. Universities 2014 ====
Roshanara Ebrahim won the Miss Nairobi University 2014 contest, which earned her an entry to Mr. and Mrs. Universities 2014 which she also won.

==== Miss World Kenya 2016 ====
After winning Miss Nairobi County 2016, Roshanara Ebrahim was crowned Miss World Kenya in 2016, but was stripped off her title following a series of controversies. She was replaced by Evelyn Njambi the then reigning 'Miss Kiambu'.

After losing her crown, Roshanara was embroiled in a lawsuit after her ex-boyfriend (Frank Zahlten) leaked her nude photos, culminating in her being 'dethroned' of the Miss Kenya title. Following this, Roshanara sued her ex-boyfriend and the Miss Kenya organiser – Ashleys Kenya. On October 7, 2016, Mr. Apollo Mboya, Frank Zahlten's lawyer accused Roshanara of having abducted Frank and of being an alcoholic who had no integrity to hold the crown. Roshanara set the judicial precedent for the right to digital privacy against revenge porn in Kenya. A high court ruling delivered on December 7, 2016, ruled in favour of Roshanara, concluding that non consensual circulation of intimate images was a gross human rights issue, and that it breached the right to one's privacy under Article 31 (c) of Kenya's Constitution. The third respondent, Frank Zahlten (Roshanara's ex-boyfriend), was required to pay the petitioner (Miss Kenya) $10,000 in damages, for breach of her right to privacy. But she was not able to regain the Miss World Kenya 2016 title, which was given to her runner-up Evelyn Njambi, who finished in the Top 5 at Miss World 2016.

==== Miss Supermodel International Kenya 2018 ====
Roshanara Ebrahim auditioned for and won the Miss Supermodel International Kenya 2018 contest. And represented Kenya in China.

In December 2018, Roshanara travelled to Huizhou, Guangdong Province of China. Where she participated in the World Supermodel All Star Championships. The seriousness of the show could be questioned as not a single international model made it to the final. And only won by an all Chinese podium.

==== Miss Universe Kenya 2021 ====
Roshanara Ebrahim participated in the Miss Universe Kenya 2018 contest but didn't make it through to top 20.

She tried again in 2021. And on October 25, 2021. The Miss Universe Kenya organization announced Roshanara was among the top ten semifinalist contestants for Miss Universe Kenya 2021. On October 30, 2021, she was crowned Miss Universe Kenya 2021.

Roshanara represented Kenya at the Miss Universe 2021 the 70th Miss Universe pageant, on December 13, 2021, in Eilat, Israel.

==== Miss Universe 2021 ====
On November 27, 2021, Roshanara left for Israel to participate in the Miss Universe 2021 contest.

On day 3 of the Miss Universe competition, she was selected together with 9 other contestants to take part in the Haboydem Fashion Show in Jerusalem.

On December 10, 2021, Roshanara participated in the Preliminary Competition (Swimsuit & Evening Gown) and the National Costume Show, but was unplaced in the December 13, 2021 Final Competition.

==== Kenyan Pageant Record ====
Roshanara Ebrahim is the first Kenyan pageant contestant to have won the Miss World Kenya, Miss Supermodel International Kenya and Miss Universe Kenya contests.

=== Other professions ===
==== International relations & diplomacy training ====
In March 2012, she was a Kenyan Model United Nations delegate. From July 2013 to August 2013, she was a European International Model United Nations delegate. And she served as chairperson for BITSMUN Pilani in February 2014 and for the Everest International Model United Nations in October 2014.

==== Legal profession ====
In November 2020, she became MMA Advocates LLP‘s head of business development.

==== Charity work and advocacy ====
From September 2014 to December 2015, she was a Kenya Red Cross Society assistant project manager. and in 2015, she interned at the Kenya Red Cross Society branch in Parklands, Nairobi.

In 2016, after the Miss World Kenya contest she joined Smile Train Kenya as an ambassador. And on December 11, 2021, she reaffirmed at the Miss Universe 2021 contest in Israel her commitment to continue her work with Smile Train.

==== Television and entertainment ====
In 2015 she worked for 6:AM Entertainment Kenya as an event organizer.

After the Standard Group announced her employment on one of their shows, Roshanara was a co-host alongside Sara Ndanu, who has been holding down the fort since its inception. An announcement was made on October 22, 2016, that she will be joining The Skin Therapy Show on KTN Home. She hosted “The Skin Therapy Show” from January 2017 to July 2018.

==== QHHT practitioner ====
On May 26, 2019, she became a QHHT practitioner. And in April 2020, she founded Jade Rituals in Vancouver, British Columbia, Canada. On May 27, 2021, her book “Beyond The Darkness: The Strategic Guide to the New Earth” was independently published. A book based on spirituality, self help and a happiness guide which elaborates on deep esoteric concepts with a touch of her life experiences.
