= Miss Universe Barbados =

Beauty pageant

Miss Universe Barbados Organization
- Formation: 1976; 50 years ago
- Type: Beauty pageant
- Headquarters: Bridgetown
- Location: Barbados
- Members: Miss Universe
- Official language: English
- President: Brian Green (2016-2020)

Miss Universe Barbados is the national beauty pageant for selecting a delegate to represent Barbados at the Miss Universe pageant. The current titleholder is Hillary-Ann Williams of Bridgetown.

== History ==
Miss Barbados Universe sent its first contestant to Miss Universe in 1976 and has sent 11 delegates between 1976 and 2005. They have never sent a delegate for more than 5 years in a row. After the death of the national director Andy Niles in 2006, Candi Nicholls, a former member of Niles' team, took over the franchise. Niles had been national director from 2003 to 2005.

Between 2008 and 2015 Barbados was absent from the Miss Universe pageant.

Since 2016, Crown Events Inc. with national director Brian Green are the new management of the franchise.

== Titleholders ==
- : Declared as Winner
- : Ended as runner-up or top 5/6 qualification
- : Ended as one of the finalists or semifinalists
- : Ended as special awards winner

Year	Persih	Miss Barbados	Placement at Miss Universe	Special Award(s)	Notes
Did not compete since 2021—Present
2020	Bridgetown	Hillary-Ann Williams	Unplaced		Appointed — Due to the impact of COVID-19 pandemic, the First Runner-up of 2019 crowned as the Miss Universe Barbados 2020
2019	Christ Church	Shanel Ifill	Unplaced		Due to personal reasons, Shanel Ifill resigned the title after Miss Universe 2019 and Runner-up Hillary-Ann Williams took over the title
2018	Christ Church	Meghan Theobalds	Unplaced		
2017	Bridgetown	Lesley Chapman	Unplaced		
2016	Christ Church	Shannon Harris	Unplaced		Brian Green (Crown Events Inc.) Directorship
Miss Barbados Universe
Did not compete between 2008—2015
2007	Saint Michael	Jewel Garner	Unplaced		
2006	Did not compete				
2005	Saint Michael	Nada Yearwood	Unplaced		
2004	Saint Michael	Cindy Batson	Unplaced		
2003	Saint Michael	Nadia Forte	Unplaced		Miss Barbados Universe — Andy Niles Directorship
Miss Barbados (MBCO)
Did not compete between 2000—2002
1999	Saint Michael	Olivia Harding	Unplaced		
Did not compete between 1988—1998
1987	Saint Michael	Dawn Michelle Waithe	Unplaced		
1986	Saint Michael	Roslyn Irene Williams	Unplaced		
1985	Saint Michael	Liz Wadman	Unplaced		
1984	Saint Michael	Lisa Worme	Unplaced		
Did not compete between 1980—1983
1979	Saint Michael	Barbara Bradshaw	Unplaced		
1978	Saint Michael	Judy Miller	Unplaced		
1977	Saint Michael	Margaret Rouse	Unplaced		
1976	Saint Michael	Jewell Nightingale	Unplaced		

== See also ==
- Miss Universe
