= Betty Boniphace =

TV Personality and Producer

Betty Boniface Omara
- Betty Omara posing for anchors new images
- Born: Betty Boniface Omara; 1993 (age 32–33); Dar es Salaam, Tanzania
- Height: 1.73 m (5 ft 8 in)

Betty Boniface Omara (born 1993) is a Tanzanian television personality and producer.

Since 2014, she has been a prominent broadcaster for Azam Media Limited , hosting flagship news, lifestyle, and current affairs programs on Azam Tv.

Prior to her career in journalism, she briefly worked in the fashion and modeling industry, participated in pageantry and held the Miss Universe Tanzania title on 27 September 2013.

== Career ==
Omara started her media career March 2014 at Azam TV as a television personality on the program Morning Trumpet as a news anchor and reviewing daily newspapers, later on in 2016 she stretched and started producing and presenting a lifestyle program "Mtaa wa Mitindo".

== Miss Universe ==
Betty won the crown of Miss Universe Tanzania 2013 at the National Museum Hall in Dar es Salaam on Friday night 27 September 2013, where Clara Noor was given the title of Miss Earth Tanzania and Aziza Victoria was declared as the runner up.

She represented Tanzania in the 62nd edition of the Miss Universe which took take place on November 9, 2013, at the Crocus City Hall in the 2013 Miss Universe competition in Moscow, Russia.

Awards and achievements
Preceded by Winfrida Dominic	Miss Universe Tanzania; 2013	Succeeded by Carolyne Bernard
