= Miss World Kenya =

Beauty pageant

Miss World Kenya Organization
- Formation: 1960; 66 years ago
- Type: Beauty pageant
- Headquarters: Nairobi
- Location: Kenya
- Members: Miss World
- Official language: English
- Organizer: Ashleys Limited
- Website: missworldkenya.com

Miss World Kenya is a national pageant in Kenya to represent Kenya at Miss World.

== History ==
In 2005 Miss World Kenya took on a positive turn under the management of Ashleys Kenya Limited starting a journey of status restoration and reinvigoration.

== Titleholders ==
- : Declared as Winner
- : Ended as runner-up or top 5/6 qualification
- : Ended as one of the finalists or semifinalists
- : Ended as special awards winner

Miss World Kenya has started to send a Winner to Miss World since 2005. Before 2005 the Miss Kenya organization sent its delegate to Miss World. On occasion, when the winner does not qualify (due to age) for either contest, a runner-up is sent.

Year	Miss World Kenya	Placement at Miss World	Special Awards
2027	TBA	TBA	
2026	Ivy Trizah Muhenje	Top 20	
2025	Grace Ramtu	Unplaced	
2024	No competition held		
2023	Chantou Kwamboka	Top 40	
Miss World 2021 was rescheduled to 16 March 2022 due to the COVID-19 pandemic outbreak in Puerto Rico, no edition started in 2022
2021	Sharon Obara	Top 40	Beauty with a Purpose; Miss World Talent (Top 27); Miss World Top Model (Top 13); Miss World Sport (Top 32)
Due to the impact of COVID-19 pandemic, no pageant in 2020
2019	Maria Nyamai Wavinya	Top 12	Miss World Sport (Top 32)
2018	Finali Galaiya	Unplaced	Sanya Promotional Video award
2017	Magline Jeruto	Top 5	Miss World Africa; Miss World Sport (Top 18); Miss World Top Model (Top 30)
2016	Evelyn Njambi Thungu	Top 5	Miss World Africa; Beauty with a Purpose (Top 5)
2016	Roshanara Ebrahim	Did not compete	
2015	Charity Njeri Mwangi	Unplaced	
2014	Idah Nguma	Top 11	Beauty with a Purpose; Miss World Beach Beauty (Top 5)
2013	Sherry Wangui Gitonga	Unplaced	
2012	Shamim Fauz Ali	Top 15	
2011	Catherine Susan Anyango	Unplaced	
2010	Natasha Metto	Top 25	Beauty with a Purpose
2009	Fiona Yiasi Konchellah	Unplaced	
2008	Ruth Nkambura Kinuthia	Unplaced	
2007	Catherine Wangari Wainaina	Unplaced	
2006	Khadijah Shamillah Kiptoo	Unplaced	
2005	Cecilia Murugi Mwangi	Unplaced	
Miss Kenya
2004	Juliet Atieno Ocheng	Unplaced	
2003	Janet Muthoni Kibugu	Unplaced	
2002	Marianne Nyambura Kariuki	Unplaced	
2001	Daniella Kimaru	Unplaced	
2000	Yolanda Masinde	Top 10	Miss World Africa
1999	Esther Muthee	Unplaced	
Did not compete between 1997—1998
1996	Pritpal Kulwant Dhamu	Unplaced	
1995	Did not compete		
1994	Josephine Wanjiku Mbatia	Unplaced	
Did not compete between 1992—1993
1991	Nkirote Karimi M’Mbijjiwe	Unplaced	
1990	Aisha Wawira Lieberg	Unplaced	Miss World Africa
1989	Grace Chabari	Unplaced	
1988	Dianna Naylor	Unplaced	Miss World Africa
1987	Sheila Linda Kegode	Unplaced	
1986	Patricia Maingi	Unplaced	
1985	Jacqueline Mary Thom	Unplaced	
1984	Khadija Adam Ismail	Top 15	Miss World Africa
Did not compete between 1969—1983
1968	Josephine Moikobu	Unplaced	
1967	Zipporah Mbugua	Unplaced	
Did not compete between 1961—1966
1960	Jasmine Batty	Top 18	
