= Miss RSA =

South Africa beauty pageant

Miss Republic of South Africa
- Formation: 1975
- Type: Beauty pageant
- Headquarters: Johannesburg
- Location: South Africa
- Official language: English
- Company: Rapport

Miss Republic of South Africa (known as Miss RSA) was a national multi-raced Beauty pageant in South Africa. The titleholders were sent to compete in Miss Universe pageant from 1975 to 1981. The pageant was owned by South African Rapport.

== History ==
In 1975, The publisher of the newspaper Rapport created the Miss RSA pageant for coloured girls. Only in 1978 a multi-raced Miss RSA pageant was started in the then-Apartheid South Africa to blend in the ladies from all races.

== Titleholders ==
Color key

- Declared as Winner
- Ended as runner-up
- Ended as one of the finalists or semifinalists

Miss Republic of South Africa existed between 1975 and 1981.

Year	Miss Republic of South Africa	Represented	Placement at Miss Universe	Special Awards	Notes
1975	Gail Anthony	Cape Town	Unplaced		
1976	Cynthia Claasen	Cape Town	Unplaced		
1977	Glynis Fester	Cape Town	Unplaced		
1978	Margaret Gardiner	Cape Town	WINNER		
1979	Veronica Wilson	Johannesburg	Top 12		
1980	Jenny Kay	Johannesburg	Did not compete		Due to political reasons, she was not allowed to enter in South Korea to compete at the Miss Universe.
1981	Daniela di Paolo	Durban	Unplaced		
