= Miss Universe 2007 =

56th Miss Universe competition, beauty pageant edition

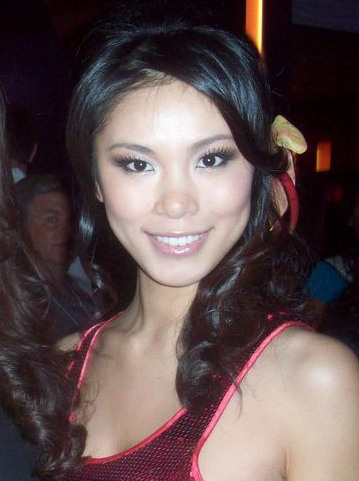
- Riyo Mori
- Date: 28 May 2007
- Presenters: Mario Lopez; Vanessa Minnillo
- Entertainment: RBD
- Venue: National Auditorium, Mexico City, Mexico
- Broadcaster: International: NBC; Telemundo; Official broadcaster: Televisa
- Entrants: 77
- Placements: 15
- Debuts: Montenegro; Serbia; Tanzania
- Withdrawals: Cayman Islands; Chile; Ethiopia; Ghana; Iceland; Ireland; Latvia; Namibia; Northern Mariana Islands; Serbia and Montenegro; Sri Lanka; Saint Vincent and the Grenadines; Sint Maarten; Sweden; Trinidad and Tobago; Turkey; United Kingdom
- Returns: Barbados; Belize; Curaçao; Honduras; Italy
- Winner: Riyo Mori; Japan
- Congeniality: Zhang Ningning; China
- Photogenic: Anna Theresa Licaros; Philippines

Miss Universe 2007 was the 56th Miss Universe pageant, held at the Auditorio Nacional in Mexico City, Mexico, on 28 May 2007.

At the end of the event, Zuleyka Rivera of Puerto Rico crowned Riyo Mori of Japan as Miss Universe 2007. It was Japan's first victory in forty-eight years, and the second victory of the country in the pageant's history.

Contestants from seventy-seven countries and territories competed in this year's pageant. The competition was hosted by Mario Lopez and Vanessa Minnillo, Miss Teen USA 1998. Mexican Latin pop group RBD performed in this year's pageant.

== Background ==
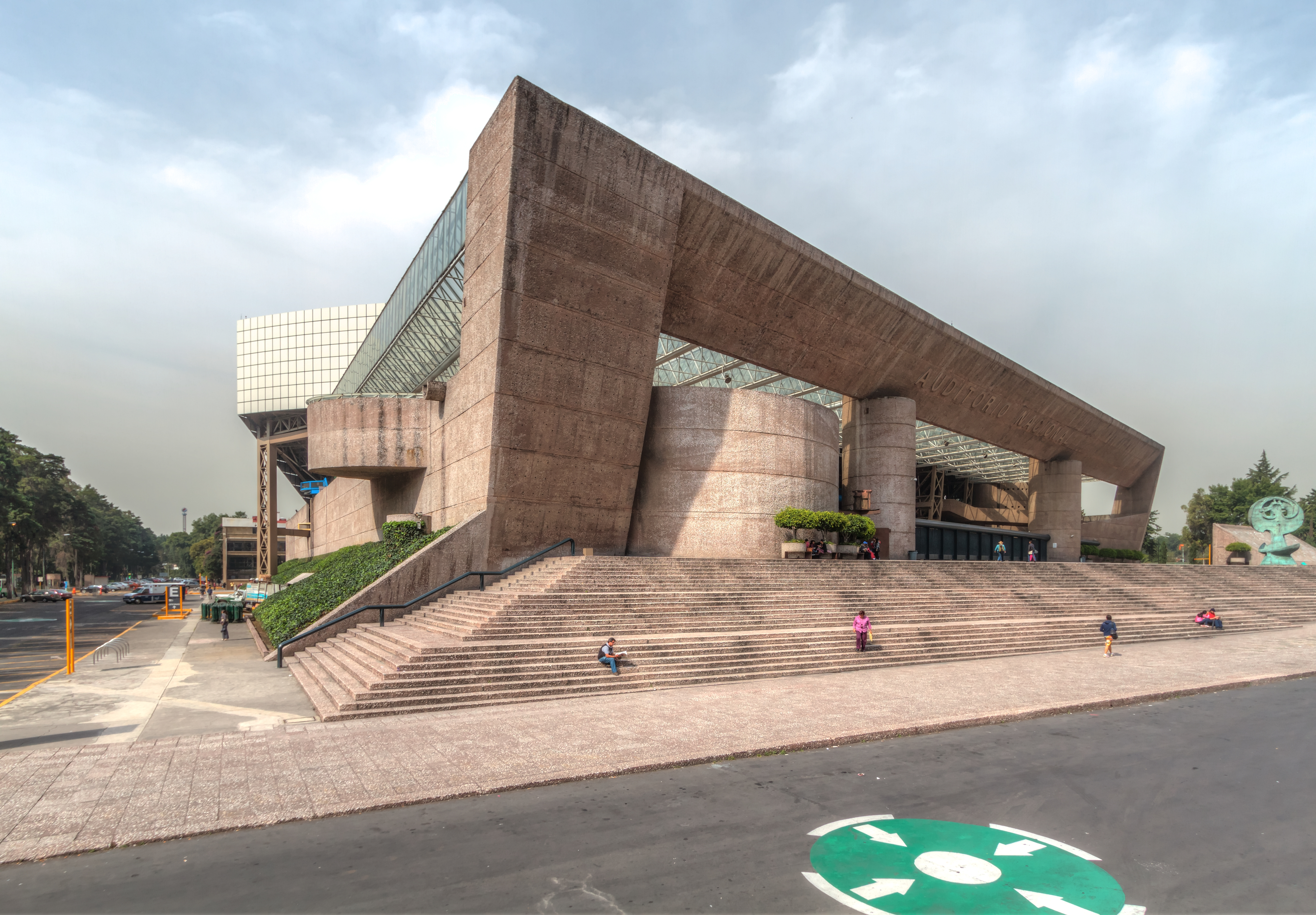
Auditorio Nacional, Mexico City, the venue for Miss Universe 2007

=== Location and date ===
On 11 February 2007, Pedro Rodríguez, president of the Grupo Promotor Mu México announced that the cities of Cancún and Oaxaca will host the 2007 edition of the pageant in May. However, on 30 March 2007, Donald Trump, owner of the Miss Universe Organization, and Paula Shugart, president of the Miss Universe Organization, announced that the pageant will take place at the Auditorio Nacional in Mexico City on 28 May 2007. Oaxaca had to reject from being one of the host cities for some pageant events due to the political-social conflict happening at the state. The ruins of Monte Albán in Oaxaca was planned to be the location for the national costume competition, but was relocated to the Angel of Independence in Mexico City.

=== Selection of participants ===
Contestants from seventy-seven countries and territories were selected to compete in the competition. Two of these delegates were appointees to their positions after being a runner-up of their national pageant or being selected through a casting process, while two selected to replace the original dethroned winner.

==== Replacements ====
Sharon Kenett was appointed to represent Israel at Miss Universe after Liran Kohener, Miss Israel 2007, had to complete her mandatory military service. Miss Mauritius 2006 Melody Selvon was replaced by Sandra Faro, the first runner-up of Miss Mauritius 2006, due to being underage. Selvon was only 16 years old.

==== Debuts, returns and withdrawals ====
The 2007 edition saw the debuts of Tanzania, Serbia, and Montenegro as two separate nations, and the returns of Barbados, Belize, Curaçao, Honduras, Italy. Honduras last competed in 2002, while the others last competed in 2005. The Cayman Islands, Chile, Ethiopia, Ghana, Iceland, Ireland, Latvia, Namibia, the Northern Mariana Islands, Sint Maarten, Trinidad and Tobago, Turkey, and the United Kingdom withdrew after their respective organizations failed to hold a national competition or appoint a delegate. Serbia and Montenegro competed as two separate countries starting in this edition. Aruni Rajapaksha of Sri Lanka withdrew due to undisclosed reasons. However, Rajapaksha competed in the pageant the following year. Casynella Olivierre of the Saint Vincent and the Grenadines withdrew for unknown reasons despite announcing that she will compete in Miss Universe 2007 two years in advance. Lestapier Winqvist of Sweden withdrew after not showing up for the pageant since she finded the competition "misogynistic".

=== Incidents before the pageant ===
In April 2007, controversy erupted over the proposed national costume of Rosa María Ojeda, Miss Mexico. The skirt of the costume depicted scenes from the Cristero War, a Roman Catholic rebellion in the 1920s in which thousands of people were killed, including hangings. The outfit also included a bullet-studded belt and a crucifix necklace. The design was chosen from over thirty others and had been intended to show Mexico's culture and history, but it elicited controversy amid claims it was in poor taste and inappropriate. Pageant owners said that the costume would be redesigned to include image of the Virgin of Guadalupe.

== Results ==
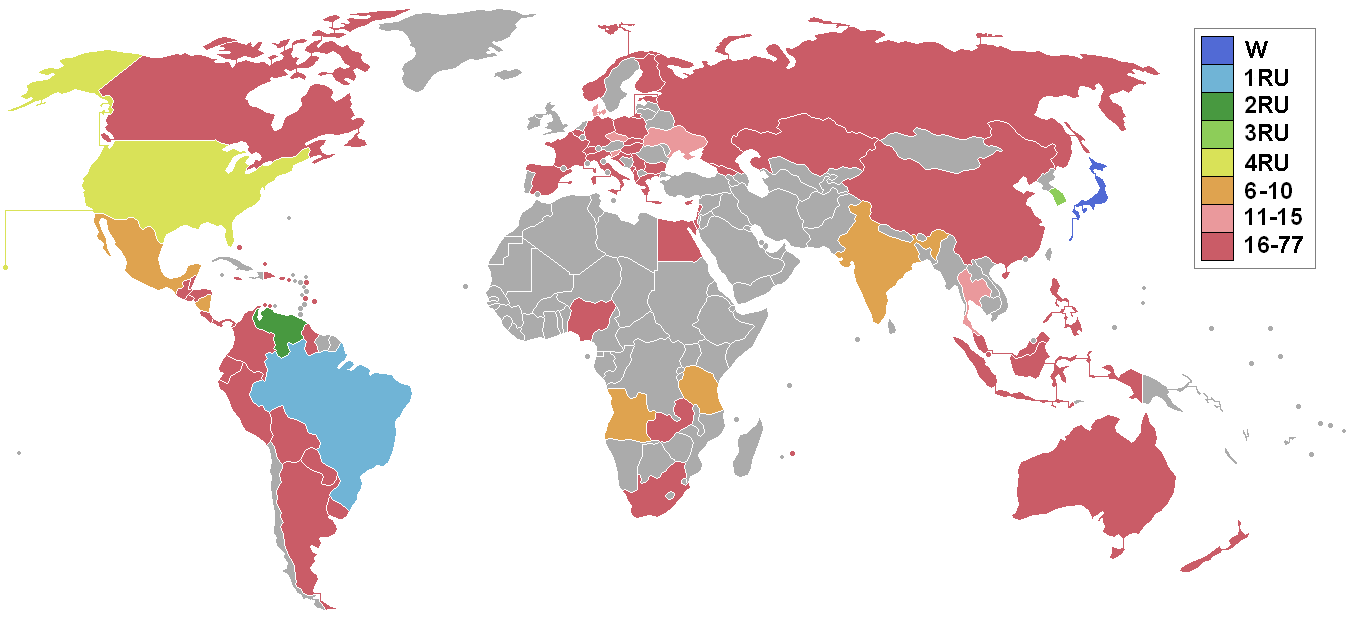
Miss Universe 2007 participating countries and territories.

=== Placements ===
Placement	Contestant
Miss Universe 2007	Japan – Riyo Mori
1st Runner-Up	Brazil – Natália Guimarães
2nd Runner-Up	Venezuela – Ly Jonaitis
3rd Runner-Up	South Korea – Honey Lee
4th Runner-Up	United States – Rachel Smith
Top 10	Angola – Micaela Reis; India – Puja Gupta; Mexico – Rosa María Ojeda; Nicaragua – Xiomara Blandino; Tanzania – Flaviana Matata
Top 15	Czech Republic – Lucie Hadasová; Denmark – Žaklina Šojić; Slovenia – Tjaša Kokalj; Thailand – Farung Yuthithum; Ukraine – Lyudmila Bikmullina

=== Special awards ===
Award	Contestant
Miss Congeniality	China – Zhang Ningning
Miss Photogenic	Philippines – Anna Theresa Licaros

== Pageant ==
=== Format ===
The Miss Universe Organization introduced several specific changes to the format for this edition. The number of semifinalists was reduced to 15— the same number of semifinalists in 2005. 15 semifinalists were chosen through the preliminary competition— composed of the swimsuit and evening gown competitions and closed-door interviews. The top 15 competed in the swimsuit competition and were narrowed down to the top 10 afterward. The top 10 competed in the evening gown competition and were narrowed down to the top 5 afterward. This was the first year since 2002 that the judges' average scores were shown on television. The top 5 competed in the question and answer round and the final look. It was the first time since 2001 that the final question posed on the ladies came from the judges instead of the final five and the current Miss Universe.

=== Selection committee ===
==== Final telecast ====
- Tony Romo – Dallas Cowboys quarterback
- James Kyson Lee – actor on Heroes
- Nina Garcia – Project Runway judge and Elle magazine fashion director
- Dave Navarro – rock star
- Dayanara Torres – Miss Universe 1993 from Puerto Rico
- Mauricio Islas – Mexican actor
- Lindsay Clubine – Deal or No Deal briefcase model
- Marc Bouwer – fashion designer
- Christiane Martel – Miss Universe 1953 from France
- Michelle Kwan – World champion, 1998 Olympic silver medalist, and 2002 Olympic figure skating bronze medalist

== Contestants ==
Seventy-seven contestants competed for the title.

Country/Territory	Contestant	Age (Note: Ages at the time of the pageant)	Hometown
Albania	Sadina Alla	18	Tirana
Angola	Micaela Reis	18	Luanda
Antigua and Barbuda	Stephanie Winter	18	St. John's
Argentina	Daniela Stucan	25	Ensenada
Aruba	Carolina Raven	23	Tanki Leendert
Australia	Kimberley Busteed	18	Gladstone
(The Bahamas) Bahamas	Trinere Lynes	18	New Providence
Barbados	Jewel Garner	24	Christ Church
Belgium	Annelien Coorevits	21	Wijtschate
Belize	Maria Jeffery	25	Belize City
Bolivia	Jessica Jordan	23	Huacaraje
Brazil	Natália Guimarães	22	Belo Horizonte
Bulgaria	Gergana Kochanova	20	Sofia
Canada	Inga Skaya	21	Toronto
China	Zhang Ningning	20	Shenyang
Colombia	Eileen Roca	20	Valledupar
Costa Rica	Verónica González	24	Orotina
Croatia	Jelena Maros	19	Split
Curaçao	Naemi Monte	20	Willemstad
Cyprus	Polyvia Achilleos	22	Nicosia
Czech Republic	Lucie Hadašová	20	Strážnice
Denmark	Žaklina Šojić	25	Copenhagen
Dominican Republic	Massiel Taveras	22	Santiago
Ecuador	Lugina Cabezas	20	Quito
Egypt	Ehsan Hatem	21	Cairo
El Salvador	Lissette Rodríguez	22	Mejicanos
Estonia	Viktoria Azovskaja	20	Tallinn
Finland	Noora Hautakangas	23	Soini
France	Rachel Legrain-Trapani	18	Saint Quentin
(Georgia (country)) Georgia	Ana Giorgelashvili	19	Martvili
Germany	Angelina Glass	19	Berlin
Greece	Doukissa Nomikou	20	Athens
Guatemala	Alida Boer	22	Guatemala City
Guyana	Meleesea Payne	21	Georgetown
Honduras	Wendy Salgado	24	Tegucigalpa
Hungary	Ildikó Bóna	19	Kaposmérő
India	Puja Gupta	23	New Delhi
Indonesia	Agni Pratistha	19	Jakarta
Israel	Sharon Kenett	21	Tel Aviv
Italy	Valentina Massi	24	Forlimpopoli
Jamaica	Zahra Redwood	25	Kingston
Japan	Riyo Mori	20	Shizuoka
Kazakhstan	Gaukhar Rakhmetaliyeva	20	Almaty
Lebanon	Nadine Njeim	19	Maaser El Shouf
Malaysia	Adelaine Chin Ai Nee	23	Kuala Lumpur
Mauritius	Sandra Faro	20	Quatre Bornes
Mexico	Rosa María Ojeda	20	Culiacán
Montenegro	Snežana Bušković	19	Podgorica
New Zealand	Laural Barrett	20	Christchurch
Nicaragua	Xiomara Blandino	22	Managua
Nigeria	Ebinabo Potts-Johnson	19	Port Harcourt
Norway	Kirby Ann Basken	21	Oslo
Panama	Sorangel Matos	22	Yaviza
Paraguay	María José Maldonado	21	Fernando de la Mora
Peru	Jimena Elías	18	Lima
Philippines	Anna Theresa Licaros	22	Cuenca
Poland	Dorota Gawron	23	Częstochowa
Puerto Rico	Wilmadilis Blasini	25	Guayanilla
Russia	Tatiana Kotova	21	Moscow
Saint Lucia	Yoanna Henry	25	Soufrière
Serbia	Teodora Marčić	19	Novi Sad
Singapore	Jessica Tan	25	Singapore
Slovakia	Lucia Senášiová	23	Bratislava
Slovenia	Tjaša Kokalj	21	Ljubljana
South Africa	Megan Coleman	22	Hillcrest
South Korea	Honey Lee	24	Seoul
Spain	Natalia Zabala	24	San Sebastián
Switzerland	Christa Rigozzi	24	Monte Carasso
Tanzania	Flaviana Matata	19	Shinyanga
Thailand	Farung Yuthithum	20	Pathum Thani
Turks and Caicos Islands	Saneita Been	21	Providenciales
Ukraine	Lyudmila Bikmullina	21	Kharkiv
United States	Rachel Smith	22	Clarksville
United States Virgin Islands	Renata Christian	23	Saint Thomas
Uruguay	Giannina Silva	22	Montevideo
Venezuela	Ly Jonaitis	21	Tocuyito
Zambia	Rosemary Chileshe	26	Lusaka
