= Nelly Kamwelu =

Tanzanian model and beauty queen (born 1993)

- Born: Nelly Alexsandra Kamwelu; 1993 (age 32–33); Dar es Salaam, Tanzania
- Occupations: Modeling, Video vixen
- Beauty pageant titleholder
- Title: Miss Universe Tanzania 2011
- Major competitions: Miss Universe Tanzania (winner)

Nelly Ahmadi Kamwelu (born 1993) is a Tanzanian model and beauty pageant titleholder who won the Miss Universe Tanzania and Miss Southern Africa International titles in 2011.She represented her country in Miss Universe 2011 in São Paulo, Brazil, Miss International 2011 in China, Miss Earth 2011 in Manila, Philippines, and Miss Tourism Queen International in China.

She is her country's only beauty queen who has competed in four Grand Slam Pageants (Miss Universe, Miss International, Miss Earth and Miss Tourism Queen International) in a single year.

== Biography ==
Kamwelu was born to a Tanzanian father and a Russian mother. She started participating in regional beauty contests in 2008 and finally ended up as the second runner-up in Miss Ilala 2008 after which she participated in Miss Tanzania the same year but was unplaced.

She also represented Tanzania in Miss International 2011 which was held in China and Miss Earth 2011 in Manila, Philippines but did not place in either.

Finally she represented her country in Miss Tourism Queen International 2011 which was held in Xi'an, China where she ended up as the 4th runner up.

== Miss Universe Tanzania ==
Kamwelu won the fifth edition of the Miss Universe Tanzania pageant in May 2011. and represented her country in the Miss Universe 2011 pageant in São Paulo, Brazil. Although she didn't place but grabbed attention with her National Costume which received a lot of positive reactions.

Nelly replaced the Second-Runner-up of Miss Universe Tanzania to participate in Miss International 2011 and also replaced the First-runner-up upon returning to her country from Chengdu, China to represent Tanzania in Miss Earth 2011.

Towards the end of the year, she was elected to represent Tanzania in Miss Tourism Queen International2011.

This feat makes her Tanzania's first and only beauty queen to participate in Four Grand Slam Pageants (Miss Universe, Miss International, Miss Eart, and Miss Tourism Queen International (TQI)) in a single year.

== Miss Southern Africa International ==
Kamwelu was sponsored by the Tanzania Tourist Board to represent the country in Miss Southern Africa International pageant which was held in Ndola, Zambia as a part of Zambia International Trade Fair. She won the main title by defeating six other contestants and also won the best Evening Gown award.
