= Flaviana Matata =

Tanzanian beauty queen and fashion model (born 1987)

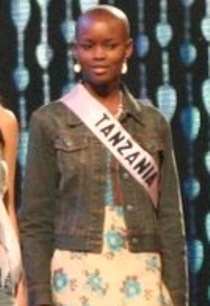
- Born: 9 June 1987 (age 39); Shinyanga, Tanzania
- Occupations: Model; Beauty Pageant Winner; Humanitarian; Entrepreneur
- Height: 5 ft 9 in (1.75 m)
- Beauty pageant titleholder
- Title: Miss Universe Tanzania 2007
- Agency: The Lions (New York, Los Angeles); Next Model Management (Paris, London); Sight Management Studio (Barcelona); Boss Models (Cape Town)
- Hair color: Black
- Eye color: Brown
- Major competitions: Miss Universe Tanzania 2007 (Winner); Miss Universe 2007 (Top 10)

Flaviana Matata (born June 9, 1987) is a Tanzanian fashion model and beauty pageant titleholder who was crowned Miss Universe Tanzania 2007 and represented her country at Miss Universe 2007 where she placed Top 10. She is the one of top Seven list of models that have recorded the highest income in Africa mentioned by 2013 Forbes Africa. In 2017 she was mentioned by okay.com as one of Top 100 Women in Africa.

== Early life and education ==
She was born and raised in Shinyanga Tanzania. She was mostly raised by her father after the death of her mother, who died in the sinking of MV Bukoba during 1996. She attended Kowak Girls Mission Secondary School for her secondary education, and then she did a diploma course in electrical engineering at Arusha Technical College before heading to Miss Universe Tanzania.

== Miss Universe 2007 ==
Matata won the first edition of the Miss Universe Tanzania pageant in 2007, and went on to represent her country in the Miss Universe pageant the same year, where she was placed among the top 15 semifinalists and ended up in 6th place after the evening gown competition. She was the first contestant from Tanzania to compete at Miss Universe 2007, and compete with a shaved head.

== Awards, recognition and nominations ==
Year	Event	Prize	Work	Result
2011	Arise Fashion Magazine Awards	Model Of The Year	Herself	Won
2012	Nigeria Next Super Model Awards	Outstanding Female Model Of The Year	Herself	Won
2012	Africa Diaspora Awards	Face Of Africa	Herself	Won
2013	Swahili Fashion Week Awards	Humanitarian Of The Year	Herself	Won
2016	Clouds Fm Malkia Wa Nguvu Awards	Arts And Culture	Lavy Products	Won
2018	Global Women Gala	Most Inspirational Woman	Herself	Won
