= Tjaša Kokalj =

Slovene model and actress

- Born: Ljubljana, Slovenia
- Beauty pageant titleholder
- Title: Miss Universe Slovenia 2007
- Hair color: Blonde
- Eye color: Green
- Major competitions: Miss Universe Slovenia 2007 (Winner); Miss Universe 2007 (Top 15)

Tjaša Kokalj is a Slovene actress, model and beauty pageant titleholder who was crowned Miss Universe Slovenia 2007 and was represented Slovenia at the Miss Universe 2007.

== Early life ==
Kokalj is model and actress in Slovenia.

== Pageantry ==
=== Miss Universe Slovenia 2007 ===
Kokalj was crowned Miss Universe Slovenia 2007.

=== Miss Universe 2007 ===
Kokalj was represented Slovenia at Miss Universe 2007 and placed Top 15.

Awards and achievements
Preceded by Nataša Pinoza	Miss Universe Slovenia; 2007	Succeeded by Anamarija Avbelj
