= Miss Universe Tanzania =

Beauty contest in Tanzania

Miss Universe Tanzania Organization
- Formation: 2007; 19 years ago
- Type: Beauty Pageant
- Headquarters: Dar es Salaam
- Location: Tanzania
- Members: Miss Universe
- Official language: English; Swahili
- National Director: Millen Happiness Magese

Miss Universe Tanzania is a beauty pageant that was first held in 2007. It is the national contest to choose the representative for the Miss Universe pageant.

== History ==
Miss Universe Tanzania identified was held for first time in 2007. Since that year the pageant became the official national franchise holder of Miss Universe, Miss International and Miss Earth. Since the pageant's inception, the second runner up of the Miss Universe Tanzania used to compete at Miss International until 2011 when the Miss Universe Tanzania organization severed ties with them and ceased to send representatives to said pageant. Nowadays the Miss Universe Tanzania has only franchised the main winner to Miss Universe. Inside the organizer of Miss Universe Maria Sarungi Tsehai Management; Miss Universe Tanzania, Miss Universe Ethiopia and Miss Universe Kenya are having a single franchise to present the winner as their country's ambassador to Miss Universe under Maria Sarungi Tsehai Directorship. From 2025 the licence is under Millen Magese who is the CEO of Millen Privé Co & Lifestyle.

=== Directorships ===
- Maria Sarungi Tsehai (2007―2019)
- Judith Peter Ngusa (2024)
- Millen Happiness Magese (2025—present)

== Titleholders ==
- : Declared as Winner
- : Ended as runner-up or top 5/6 qualification
- : Ended as one of the finalists or semi-finalists
- : Ended as special awards winner

On occasion, when the winner does not qualify (due to age) for either contest, a runner-up is sent.

Year	Region	Miss Universe Tanzania	Placement at Miss Universe	Special Award(s)	Notes
Millen Happiness Magese directorship — a franchise holder to Miss Universe from 2025
2026	Mwanza	Queen Elizabeth Makune	TBA		
2025	Dar es Salaam	Naisae Yona	Unplaced	The Most Beautiful People 2025	
Gideon Chipungahelo directorship — a franchise holder to Miss Universe in 2024
2024	Dar es Salaam	Judith Ngusa	Unplaced		
Maria Sarungi Tsehai directorship — a franchise holder to Miss Universe between 2007―2019
Did not compete between 2020―2023: Since Covid-19, in 2020 Tanzania was absent from sending representatives under Tsehai's leadership. The existence of Miss Universe Tanzania sank and went into hiatus for several years.
2019	Morogoro	Shubila Stanton	Unplaced		
Did not compete in 2018
2017	Dar es Salaam	Lilian Maraule	Unplaced		
2016	Dodoma	Jihan Dimack	Unplaced		Later Miss Grand Tanzania and Miss Grand International 2026.
2015	Dar es Salaam	Lorraine Marriot	Unplaced		
2014	Dodoma	Nale Boniface	Unplaced		Since the winner, Bernard decided to withdraw, Boniface as a runner-up took over her participation at Miss Universe 2014 in Miami, Florida, USA.
2014	Dar es Salaam	Carolyne Bernard	Did not compete		Withdrawal — Getting accident, a Runner-up, Nale Boniface took over to represent Tanzania at Miss Universe 2014 in the United States.
2013	Dar es Salaam	Betty Boniphace	Unplaced		
2012	Dar es Salaam	Winfrida Dominic	Unplaced		
2011	Dar es Salaam	Nelly Kamwelu	Unplaced	Best National Costume (6th Runner-up)	
2010	Arusha	Nuya Hellen Dausen	Unplaced		
2009	Mwanza	Illuminata James Wize	Unplaced		
2008	Arusha	Amanda Ole Sululu	Unplaced		
2007	Dar es Salaam	Flaviana Matata	Top 10		Flaviana named as the Top sexiest Women by Globalbeauties 2007.

=== Wins by region ===
Region	Titles	Years
Dar es Salaam	9	2007, 2011, 2012, 2013, 2014, 2015, 2017, 2024, 2025
Arusha	2	2008, 2010
Mwanza	1	2009
Dodoma	1	2016
Morogoro	1	2019

== See also ==
- Miss Tanzania
- Miss Grand Tanzania
