= Mary Esther Were =

Kenyan beauty pageant titleholder

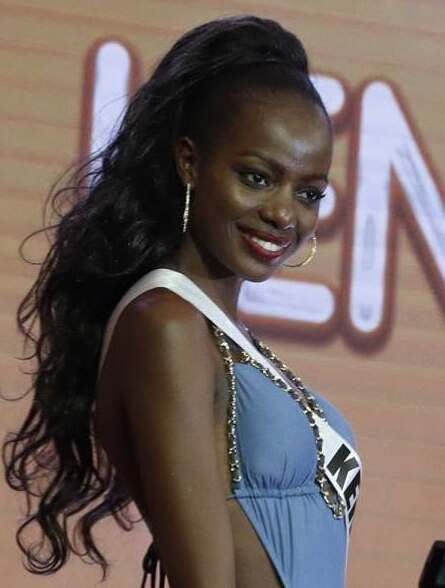
- Were in 2017
- Height: 1.80 m (5 ft 11 in)
- Beauty pageant titleholder
- Title: Miss Universe Kenya 2016
- Hair color: Black
- Eye color: Brown
- Major competitions: Miss Universe Kenya 2016 (Winner); Miss Universe 2016 (Top 6)

Mary Esther Were is a Kenyan model and beauty pageant titleholder who was crowned Miss Universe Kenya 2016. She represented her country at Miss Universe 2016 in Manila, Philippines and placed Top 6, making it the highest placement of Kenya in the history of the pageant.

== Biography ==
She won Miss Universe Kenya 2016 in Nairobi. She participated in Miss Universe 2016 in Manila. She became the first ever delegate from Kenya to advance past the first round, finishing in the Top 6.

=== Miss Universe results ===
Country	Swimsuit	Evening Gown	1st Interview	2nd Interview
Kenya	8.150 (7)	9.040 (4)	7.500 (5)	
