= Miss Antigua & Barbuda =

Antiguan national beauty pageant

Miss Antigua and Barbuda Organization
- Formation: 1957
- Type: Beauty pageant
- Headquarters: St. John's
- Location: Antigua and Barbuda
- Members: Miss Universe; Miss World
- Chairman: Cliff Williams
- Website: antiguacarnival.com

Miss Antigua & Barbuda is a national Beauty pageant in Antigua and Barbuda.

== History ==
Miss Antigua and Barbuda was established in 1957 as Carnival Queen beauty contest. Currently, the Antigua and Barbuda Festivals Commission and Calvin Southwell are the organizers of the pageant. The winners traditionally represented the island federation at the Miss World and Miss Universe pageants. Antigua and Barbuda debuted in Miss Universe in 1977 and Miss World in 1986. The pageant was organized and promoted by Antigua and Barbuda Festivals Commission and Antigua Carnival.

== 2001–2008 ==
The Miss Antigua and Barbuda was directed by Calvin Southwell.

== Titleholders ==
Year	Miss Antigua and Barbuda
1957	Gloria White
1958	Genevieve Stamers
1959	Joan Abbott
1960	Angela Jeffery
1961	Rosemary Strife
1962	Hyacinth Watt
1963	Lucinda Hewlett
1964	Irma Pringle
1965	Hyacinth Barrow
1966	Gloria Abbot
1967	Valerie Lake
1968	Patsy Isaac
1969	Angella Sweeney
1970	Carol James
1971	Claudia Augustin
1972	Cynthia Ryan
1973	Pauline George
1974	Jazelle Lake
1975	Cleopatra Saunders
1976	Sheryl Ann Gibbons
1979	Elsie Maynard
1986	Karen Rhona Eartha Knowles
1988	Irma-Marie Senhouse
1991	Joanne Bird
2001	Janil Lydia-Therese Bird
2002	Aisha Ralph
2003	Kai Davis
2004	Anne-Marie Brown
2005	Shermain Sunja Jeremy
2006	Shari Janay McEwan
2007	Stephanie Winter
2008	Athina James
2015	Asha Frank
2016	Leanda Ann Norville
2017	Ayana Dorsette
2018	Titonyah Athill
2019	Taqiyyah Francis

== Big Four pageants representatives ==
=== Miss Antigua and Barbuda Universe ===
- : Declared as Winner
- : Ended as runner-up or top 5/6 qualification
- : Ended as one of the finalists or semi-finalists
- : Ended as special awards winner

The winner of Miss Antigua and Barbuda represents the country at the Miss Universe pageant. On occasion, when the winner does not qualify (due to age) a runner-up is sent.

Year	Miss Antigua and Barbuda	Placement at Miss Universe	Special Award(s)	Notes
Did not compete since 2017—Present
2016	Leanda Ann Norville	Did not compete		
Did not compete between 2009—2015
2008	Athina James	Unplaced		
2007	Stephanie Winter	Unplaced		
2006	Shari Janay McEwan	Unplaced		
2005	Shermain Sunja Jeremy	Unplaced		
2004	Anne-Marie Brown	Unplaced		
2003	Kai Davis	Unplaced	Miss Congeniality	
2002	Aisha Ralph	Unplaced		
2001	Janil Lydia-Therese Bird	Unplaced		Miss Antigua and Barbuda pageant – Calvin Southwell Directorship.
Miss Antigua
Did not compete between 1980—2000
1979	Elsie Maynard	Unplaced		
1978	Did not compete			
1977	Sheryl Ann Gibbons	Unplaced		Antigua Carnival Queen Committee – Sheryl was the 1976 Carnival Queen, she wore "Miss Antigua" sash.

=== Miss Antigua and Barbuda World ===
- : Declared as Winner
- : Ended as runner-up or top 5/6 qualification
- : Ended as one of the finalists or semi-finalists
- : Ended as special awards winner

The winner of Miss World Antigua and Barbuda represents the country at the Miss World pageant. On occasion, when the winner does not qualify (due to age) a runner-up is sent.

Year	Miss Antigua and Barbuda World	Placement at Miss World	Special Award(s)	Notes
Did not compete since 2020—Present
2019	Taqiyyah Francis	Top 40	Miss World Top Model (Top 40)	
Did not compete between 2017—2018
2016	Latisha Greene	Unplaced		Miss World Antigua and Barbuda committee independently held the national competition for Antigua and Barbuda.
Antigua and Barbuda Representatives from Miss Antigua and Barbuda
Did not compete between 2009—2015
2008	Athina James	Unplaced		
Did not compete between 2005—2007
2004	Shermain Sunja Jeremy	Top 15	Miss World Talent	
2003	Anne-Marie Brown	Unplaced		
2002	Zara Razzaq	Unplaced		
2001	Janelle Williams	Unplaced		
Did not compete between 1992—2000
1991	Joanne Bird	Unplaced		
Did not compete between 1987—1990
1986	Karen Rhona Eartha Knowles	Unplaced		
