= Miss Universe 1987 =

36th Miss Universe pageant

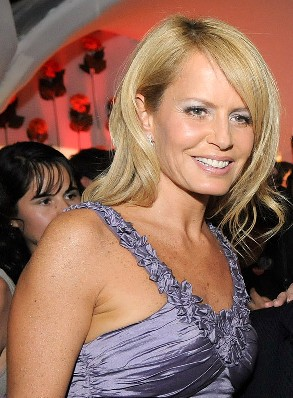
- Cecilia Bolocco
- Date: 27 May 1987 (Note: The event was held at 8:00 am Singapore Time (UTC+08:00); for the Americas, this was May 26 in their local times.)
- Presenters: Bob Barker; Mary Frann
- Entertainment: Cultural Dance Group of Singapore; Little Sisters of Singapore
- Venue: World Trade Centre, Singapore
- Broadcaster: CBS(international); SBC (official broadcaster)
- Entrants: 68
- Placements: 10
- Debuts: Egypt; Greenland; Kenya
- Withdrawals: Aruba; Belgium; Cook Islands; Côte d’Ivoire; Gambia; Gibraltar; Iceland; Luxembourg; Papua New Guinea; Poland; Réunion; Scotland; Western Samoa; Zaire
- Returns: Nigeria; Senegal
- Winner: Cecilia Bolocco; Chile
- Congeniality: Francia Tatiana Reyes; Honduras
- Best National Costume: Jacqueline Meirelles; Brazil
- Photogenic: Patricia López Ruiz; Colombia

Miss Universe 1987 was the 36th Miss Universe pageant, held at the World Trade Centre in Singapore, on 27 May 1987. At the conclusion of the event, Bárbara Palacios of Venezuela crowned Cecilia Bolocco of Chile as Miss Universe 1987. Sixty-eight contestants competed in the pageant.

== Results ==
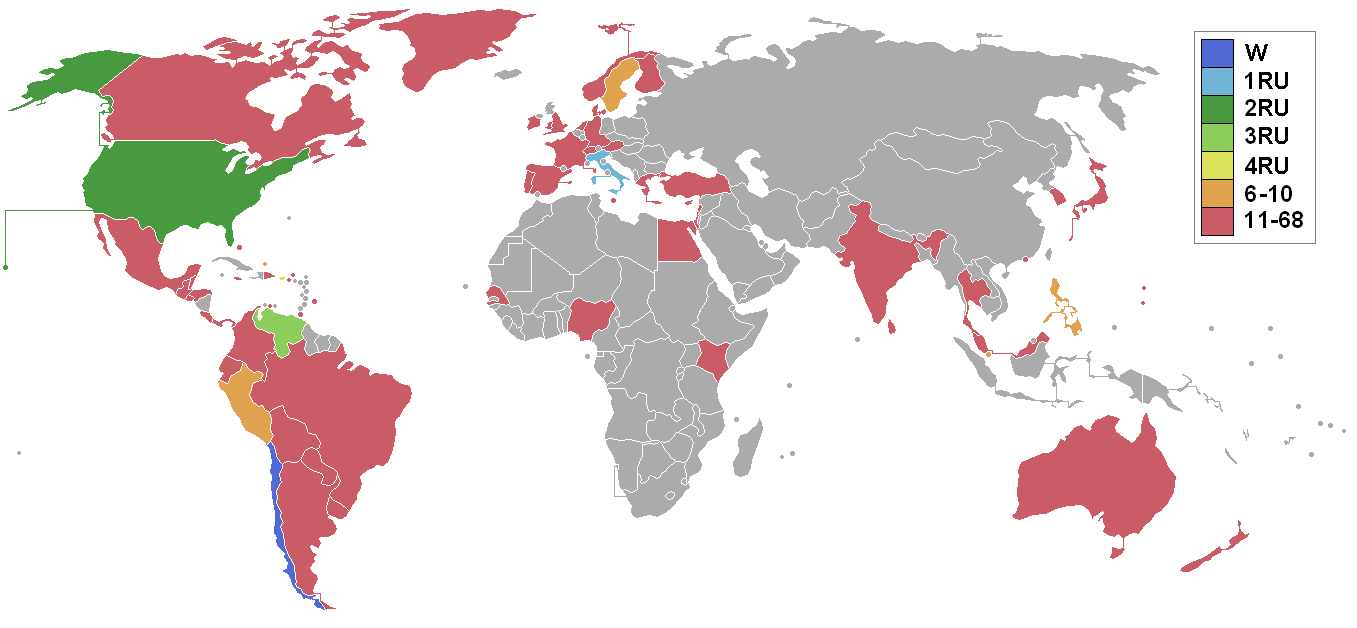
Countries and territories which sent delegates and results for Miss Universe 1987

=== Placements ===
| Placement | Contestant |
|---|---|
| Miss Universe 1987 | Chile – Cecilia Bolocco |
| 1st Runner-Up | Italy – Roberta Capua |
| 2nd Runner-Up | United States – Michelle Royer |
| 3rd Runner-Up | Venezuela – Inés María Calero |
| 4th Runner-Up | Puerto Rico – Laurie Simpson |
| Top 10 | Peru – Jessica Newton; Philippines – Geraldine Asis; Singapore – Marion Nicole Teo; Sweden – Suzanne Thörngren; Turks and Caicos Islands – Carmelita Ariza |

=== Special awards ===
| Award | Contestant |
|---|---|
| Miss Amity | Honduras – Francia Tatiana Reyes |
| Miss Photogenic | Colombia – Patricia López |
| Best National Costume | Brazil – Jacqueline Meirelles |
