= Señorita México 1990 =

- Date: September 29, 1990
- Presenters: Raúl Velasco
- Venue: World Trade Center Veracruz, Boca del Río, Veracruz
- Broadcaster: Grupo Televisa, S.A.B.
- Entrants: 32
- Placements: 12
- Winner: Lupita Jones; Baja California
- Photogenic: Lilia Serrano; Chiapas

Señorita México 1990 was the 32nd Señorita México pageant, held at the World Trade Center Veracruz, Boca del Río, Veracruz culminating in the final competition and crowning on September 29, 1990.

At the conclusion of the final competition, Lupita Jones of Baja California was crowned by outgoing titleholder Marilé del Rosario of Tlaxcala. Jones became the second Baja California titleholder and the first Mexican to win the Miss Universe title.

Jones won the Miss Universe 1991 pageant, first runner-up Lilia Cristina Serrano took over the Señorita México 1990. Serrano would later competed in Miss International 1991 in Japan, where she was Top 15 and won the Best National Costume Award.

== Results ==
Placement	Contestant
Señorita México 1990	Baja California – María Guadalupe Jones Garay ∞
1st Runner-up	Chiapas – Lilia Cristina Serrano Nájera ∞
2nd Runner- up	Veracruz – Carolina Bringas Hernández
3rd Runner-up	Yucatán – Luz María Mena Bassó
4th Runner-up	Chihuahua – María Guadalupe Amparan Hernández
Top 12	Tamaulipas -Marina Ramirez Andrade; Colima - Carla Acevedo Torres; Coahuila - Rosa Isela Sandoval Dominguez; Jalisco - María Leonor Victoria PerezDella Roca; Querétaro - Carolina Morales Mandeur; Sinaloa - María del Rosario Simancas Espinoza; Tlaxcala - María Isabel Aguilera Burgos

∞ Jones won Miss Universe 1991. Due to protocol, she resigns her title as Señorita México 1990. 1st runner-up, Lilia Cristina, replaces her as Señorita México.

== Delegates ==
State	Contestant
Aguascalientes	Karitina Gutierrez Moreno
Baja California	María Guadalupe "Lupita" Jones Garay
Baja California Sur	Adriana Ivette Gomez Lopez
Campeche	Éricka Ruiz Lavadié
Coahuila	Rosa Isela Sandoval Dominguez
Colima	Carla Acevedo Torres
Chiapas	Lilia Cristina Serrano Nájera
Chihuahua	Maria Guadalupe Amparan Hernandez
Distrito Federal	Cinthya Friedman Negrete
Durango	Maria Concepción Favela
Estado de México	Blanca Laura Rodriguez Cardona
Guanajuato	Maria Soledad Hernandez Monzon
Guerrero	Gabriela Franco Gonzalez
Hidalgo	Norma Garcia Zavala
Jalisco	María Leonor Victoria Perez Della Roca
Michoacán	Mireya Mayes Merelles
Morelos	Adriana Guadalupe Casillas Rivero
Nayarit	Robertina Martinez Sandoval
Nuevo León	Sandra Rosa Guzman Carranza
Oaxaca	Annemie Santibañez Hoffmann
Puebla	Elvira Rodriguez Tortajada
Querétaro	Carolina Morales Mandeur
Quintana Roo	Penelope Hernandez
San Luis Potosí	Maria Zulema Trejo Hernandez
Sinaloa	María del Rosario Simancas Espinoza
Sonora	Maria Sagrario Montaño Palomares
Tabasco	Isabela Rosales Herrera
Tamaulipas	Marina Ramirez Andrade
Tlaxcala	Maria Isabel Aguilera Burgos
Veracruz	Carolina Bringas Hernandez
Yucatán	Luz Maria Mena Basso
Zacatecas	Hilda Yolanda Murillo Castillo
