= Señorita México 1978 =

- Date: 1978
- Presenters: Raúl Velasco
- Broadcaster: Televisa
- Entrants: 32
- Placements: 12
- Winner: Alba Cervera; Yucatán

The 24th annual Señorita México pageant was held 1978. Thirty-two contestants competed for the national title, which was won by Alba Cervera from Yucatán who competed in Miss Universe 1978 where she was a semi finalist. Cervera was crowned by outgoing Señorita México titleholder Felicia Mercado. She is the third Yucateca to win this title.

The Señorita Mundo México title was won by Martha Eugenia Ortiz from Distrito Federal who competed in Miss World 1978 where she was 3rd runner-up. Ortiz was crowned by outgoing Señorita México titleholder Felicia Mercado in a previous event to final night of competition. She is the second Capitalina to win this title.

== Results ==
Final results	Contestant
Señorita México 1978	Yucatán - Alba Cervera
Señorita México Mundo 1978 1st Runner-up	(Mexico City) Distrito Federal - Martha Eugenia Ortiz
2nd Runner-up	Baja California - Mirna Del Río
3rd Runner-up	Sinaloa - Karla Sánchez
4th Runner-up	Oaxaca - María del Carmen Montecinos
Top 7	Durango - Ana Marcela Salas; Guanajuato - María José Urtiza

=== Special awards ===
Award	Contestant
Miss Photogenic	Morelos - Patricia Castro

== Expected contestants ==
State	Contestant	Height
Aguascalientes	Armida Herrera López	1.72
Baja California	Mirna Del Río	1.70
Baja California Sur	Norma Alicia Lucero	1.66
Campeche	Cinthya Rosaura Hernández Monrad	1.66
Chiapas	Silvia Elizabeth González Padilla	1.67
Chihuahua	Rosaura Patricia Melo Dávila	1.72
Coahuila	Gloria Martha Pérez Tijerina	1.66
Colima	Carmen Silvia González Cervantes	1.72
(Mexico City) Distrito Federal	Martha Eugenia Ortiz Gómez	1.75
Durango	Ana Marcela Salas Del Campo	1.76
Estado de México	Olga Pescador Sosa	1.67
Guanajuato	María José Urtiza Quiavallol	1.71
Guerrero	Ana Laura Resendiz Caute	1.67
Hidalgo	María Inés Uzcanga Cano	1.70
Jalisco	Ana Rosa Sánchez Mercado	1.70
Michoacán	Elsa Angélica Onchi Navarro	1.67
Morelos	Patricia Castro Mendoza	1.69
Nayarit	Hilda Rosas Preciado	1.68
Nuevo León	Ondina Rodríguez Viniegra	1.66
Oaxaca	María del Carmen Montecinos Alcazar	1.68
Puebla	Martha Patricia Tamayo	1.65
Querétaro	Georgina Camacho Ravadán	1.64
Quintana Roo	Rosy Mery Peraza González	1.70
San Luis Potosí	Mariza Shut	1.64
Sinaloa	Karla Sánchez Rojo	1.69
Sonora	Ana Elizabeth Vélez	1.68
Tabasco	Gabriela Canuda Silva	1.70
Tamaulipas	Claudia Georgina Beltrán Caballero	1.68
Tlaxcala	Martha Acevedo García	1.66
Veracruz	María del Carmen Alor Quezada	1.64
Yucatán	Alba Margarita Cervera Labat	1.70
Zacatecas	Laura De López Delgadillo	1.66
