= Martha Eugenia Ortíz =

Mexican model and beauty queen

- Born: Martha Eugenia Ortíz Gámez; May 27, 1960 (age 66); Distrito Federal, Mexico
- Height: 1.75 m (5 ft 9 in)
- Beauty pageant titleholder
- Hair color: Light brown
- Eye color: Brown
- Major competitions: Señorita México 1978 (1st runner-up); Miss Young International 1978 (2nd runner-up); Miss World 1978 (3rd runner-up) (Miss Photogenic)

Martha Eugenia Ortíz Gámez (born May 27, 1960) is a Mexican model and beauty pageant titleholder. She represented Mexico at the Miss World 1978 competition, who placed third runner-up.

== Pageantry ==
Ortíz began her journey in beauty pageants at the age of 17, winning the title of Señorita Distrito Federal 1978, which led her to compete nationally for the Señorita México title. On May 28, 1978, she competed in the national pageant, held in the Centro Internacional Acapulco in Acapulco, Guerrero, where she was the first runner-up. After to this achievement, Ortíz secured her entry to represent Mexico in two international pageants that same year.

Ortíz represented Mexico at Miss World 1978 which was held on November 16, 1978 at the Royal Albert Hall in London. The London press and bookmakers had her as a favorite to win the title. She achieved a remarkable fourth place and was also awarded the Miss Photogenic prize. Her one of the most successful Mexican women in this pageant at that time, being one of the first to achieve such a high position in the international final.

== Personal life ==
She was briefly married to the renowned mexican singer José María Napoleón. The popular song "Ella se llamaba Martha" (Her name was Martha) is rumored to have been inspired by her. Ortíz has mostly remained out of the public eye. She is the mother of two children, Ceci and Luis who have pursued careers in acting.

Awards and achievements
Preceded by (Brazil) Madalena Sbaraini	Miss World 3rd Runner-up; 1978	Succeeded by (Australia) Jodie Anne Day
Preceded by (Germany) Dagmar Wöhrl	Miss Photogenic; 1978	Succeeded by (Austria) Karin Zorn
Preceded by (State of Mexico) Elizabeth Aguilar	Miss World Mexico; 1978	Succeeded by (Durango) Roselina Rosas
