= Nuestra Belleza Quintana Roo 2011 =

- Date: July 1, 2011
- Venue: Hotel Gran Oasis, Cancún, Quintana Roo
- Broadcaster: Televisa
- Entrants: 5
- Placements: 3
- Winner: Valery Gantert; Cancún

Nuestra Belleza Quintana Roo 2011, was held in the Hotel Gran Oasis in Cancún, Quintana Roo on July 1, 2011. At the conclusion of the final night of competition Valery Gantert of Cancún was crowned the winner. Gantert was crowned by Lupita Jones. Six contestants competed for the title.

== Results ==
=== Placements ===
Final results	Contestant
Nuestra Belleza Quintana Roo 2011	Valery Antoinette Gantert Beristain

== Contestants ==
Hometown	Contestant	Age
Cancún	Victoria Beribeth Salinas Hernández	22
Cancún	Natalia Delgadillo Cámara	19
Cancún	Abril Adriana Pérez González	20
Cancún	María Fernanda Zúñiga Ascencio	20
Cancún	Sarife Alejandra Guzmán Sánchez	18
Cancún	Valery Antoinette Gantert Beristáin	18
Tulum	Maya Carolina Canto de Leeuw	20
