= Alba Margarita Cervera =

Mexican model and beauty titleholder

- Born: Alba Margarita Cervera Lavat; 1959 (age 66–67); Yucatán, Mexico
- Height: 1.70 m (5 ft 7 in)
- Beauty pageant titleholder
- Hair color: Black
- Eye color: Brown
- Major competitions: Señorita México 1978 (Winner); Miss Universe 1978 (Top 12)

Alba Margarita Cervera Lavat (born 1959 in Yucatán) is a Mexican model and beauty pageant titleholder who was crowned Señorita México 1978 and represented Mexico at Miss Universe 1978 where she placed top 12.

== Pageantry ==
Cervera won the title of Señorita México 1978, representing her home state of Yucatán. At the time, this was the most important national beauty pageant in Mexico. Her victory earned her the right to represent Mexico at Miss Universe that same year, which was held in Acapulco, Guerrero, giving her a particularly significant role as she competed in her home country.

During Miss Universe 1978, in addition to being a contestant, she took on an important informal role as a host figure, participating in social events, receptions, and activities alongside the other candidates, while projecting Mexico's image to the international media. Her performance was notable, as she placed among the Top 12 semifinalists thanks to her stage presence, and strong connection with the local audience.

Awards and achievements
Preceded by Felicia Mercado	Señorita México; 1978	Succeeded by Blanca Díaz Tejeda
