= Margaret Gardiner (Miss Universe) =

South African beauty queen (born 1959)

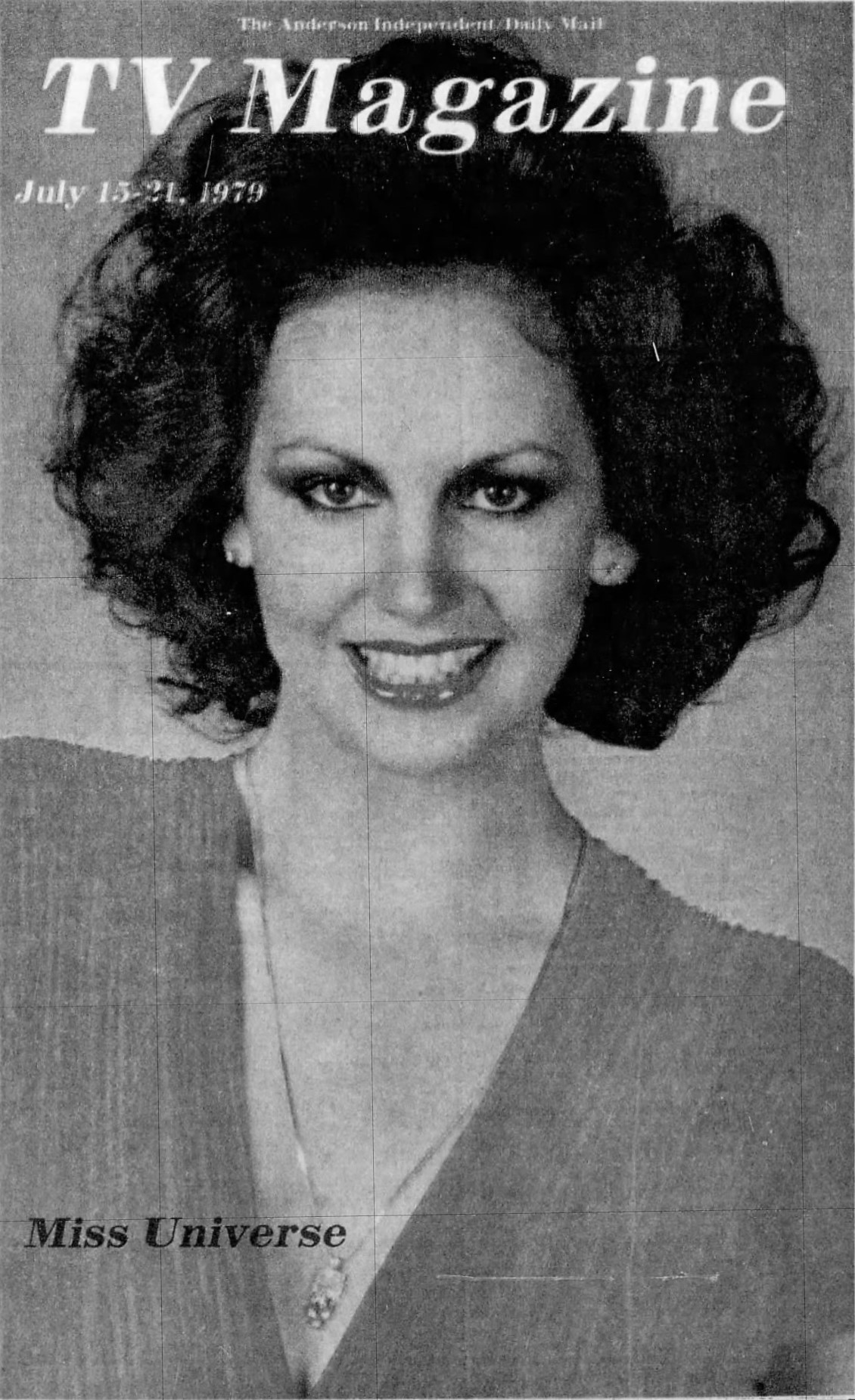
- Gardiner on the cover of TV Magazine in 1979
- Born: 21 August 1959 (age 67); Cape Town, Cape Province, Union of South Africa
- Height: 6 ft 0 in (1.83 m)
- Beauty pageant titleholder
- Title: Miss Republic of South Africa 1978; Miss Universe 1978
- Hair color: Brown
- Eye color: Green
- Major competitions: Miss Republic of South Africa 1978 (Winner); Miss Universe 1978 (Winner)

Margaret Gardiner (born 21 August 1959) is a South African journalist and beauty queen who was the winner of the Miss Universe 1978, the first South African woman, and the first African one, to win the Miss Universe title. She was 18 years old when she won the pageant. After the three semi-final competitions, she was in fourth place among the five finalists, but ended up winning the pageant after answering the final question.

During the event held in Acapulco, she received her crown from Janelle Commissiong, the first black titleholder of the pageant. She was the only Miss Universe titleholder from South Africa until Demi-Leigh Nel-Peters was crowned Miss Universe 2017.

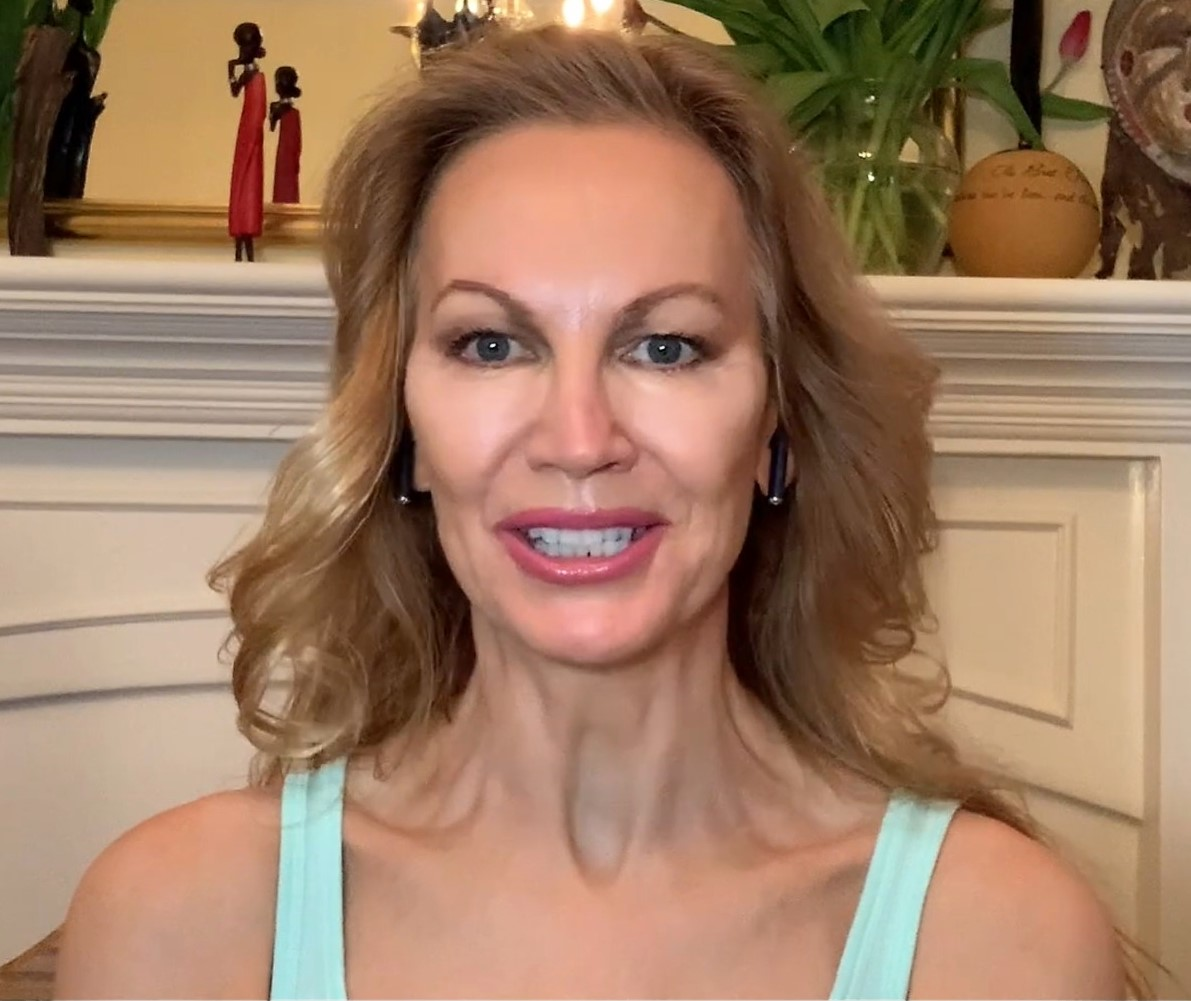
Gardiner on her YouTube channel in 2021

She holds a BA in psychology from the College of Charleston, is the author of two books on health and beauty and attended St. George's Cathedral where Desmond Tutu preached. She is now working as a print and television journalist in Los Angeles. She is married to Andre Nel, a professor of Pediatrics and Public Health at UCLA.

Awards and achievements
Preceded by (Trinidad and Tobago) Janelle Commissiong	Miss Universe; 1978	Succeeded by (Venezuela) Maritza Sayalero
