= Agnieszka Kotlarska (model) =

Polish beauty queen

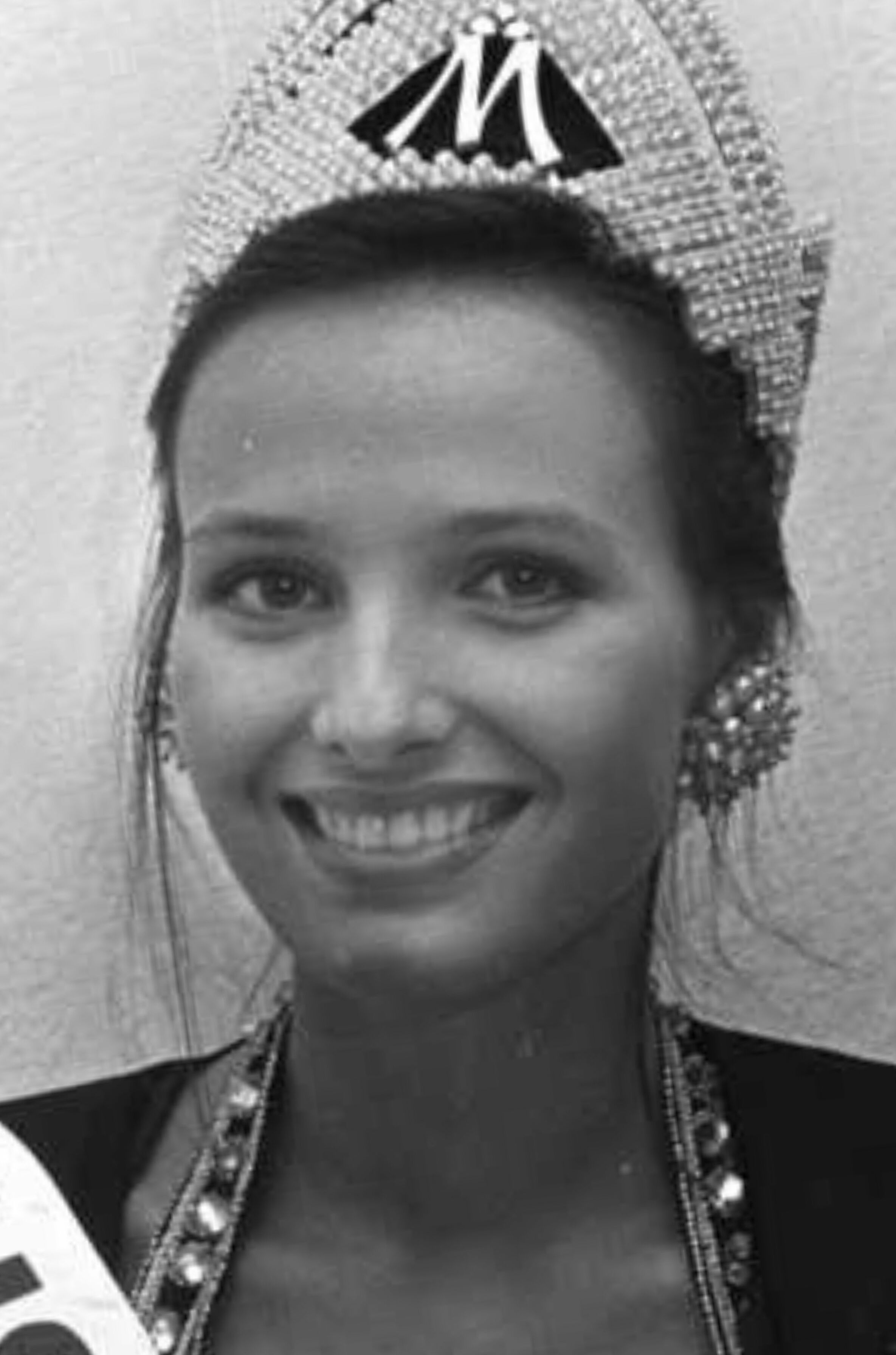
- Miss Polski 1991
- Born: Agnieszka Kotlarska; 15 August 1972; Wrocław, Poland
- Died: 27 August 1996 (aged 24); Maślice, Wrocław, Poland
- Education: Wrocław University of Science and Technology
- Height: 1.76 m (5 ft 9 in)
- Spouse: Jarosław Świątek (m. 1992)
- Children: 1
- Beauty pageant titleholder
- Title: Miss Polski 1991; Miss International 1991
- Agency: Ford Models
- Years active: 1987–1996
- Hair color: Brown (competition period); Blonde (natural)
- Eye color: Green
- Major competitions: Miss Polski 1991; (Winner); Miss International 1991 (Winner)

Agnieszka Kotlarska-Świątek (15 August 1972 – 27 August 1996) was a Polish fashion model and beauty queen.

== Career ==
While studying at Wrocław University of Science and Technology, Agnieszka won the Miss Polski beauty pageant held at the Forest Opera in Sopot on 19 July 1991. On 13 October 1991, she became the first Polish winner of the Miss International beauty pageant held in Tokyo, Japan. She was also honored with the title of Miss Photo.

She went on to pursue a modelling career in the United States, represented by Ford Models in New York for the likes of Ralph Lauren and Calvin Klein. Around 1992, while working in New York, she married Jarosław Świątek, one of the organisers of the 1991 edition of Miss Polski. The couple later returned to their native Poland at the end of 1993 to settle in her hometown Wrocław, where they would later have a daughter together.

== Death ==
Kotlarska narrowly escaped death when, at the last minute, she backed out of flying on TWA Flight 800, which crashed with no survivors off Long Island, New York on 17 July 1996. Rico Puhlmann, who was Kotlarska's chief photographer, was among the victims.

She was stabbed to death by a stalker outside her home in the Maślice district of Wrocław, on 27 August 1996. The attack also injured her husband, Jarosław Świątek. Her two-year-old daughter was a witness to the attack. She was laid to rest at Grabiszyński Cemetery on 30 August 1996. The assailant, computer programmer Jerzy Lisiewski, was subsequently sentenced to 15 years' imprisonment, finishing his sentence in 2012. Lisiewski was later arrested for stabbing a Romanian man during an attempted burglary in the district of Psie Pole in 2014.

== In popular culture ==
Kotlarska was the main subject of the 2013 film Będę Cię kochał aż do śmierci.

Kotlarska and the circumstances of her murder were namedropped in Episode 9047 of Coronation Street.

Parts of the 2021 book Wenus umiera by freelance author Aleksander Sowa were, according to readers, based on Kotlarska's life and death. Kotlarska was also the subject of one chapter of the book Kryminalny Wrocław by Iza Michalewicz.

Kotlarska and her family were also featured in a February 2023 report on the TVP1 newsmagazine Alarm!

== "AGA" Foundation ==
The Agnieszka Kotlarska Foundation, also known as AGA Foundation (Polish: Fundacja AGA) is an NGO founded in Kotlarska's hometown of Wrocław and is dedicated to providing assistance to victims of violence and victims of stalking and related psychological and physical violence.

Awards and achievements
Preceded by (Spain) Silvia de Esteban	Miss International; 1991	Succeeded by (Australia) Kirsten Davidson
Preceded by Ewa Szymczak	Miss Polski; 1991	Succeeded by Elżbieta Dziech
