= Miss Universe 1977 =

26th Miss Universe pageant

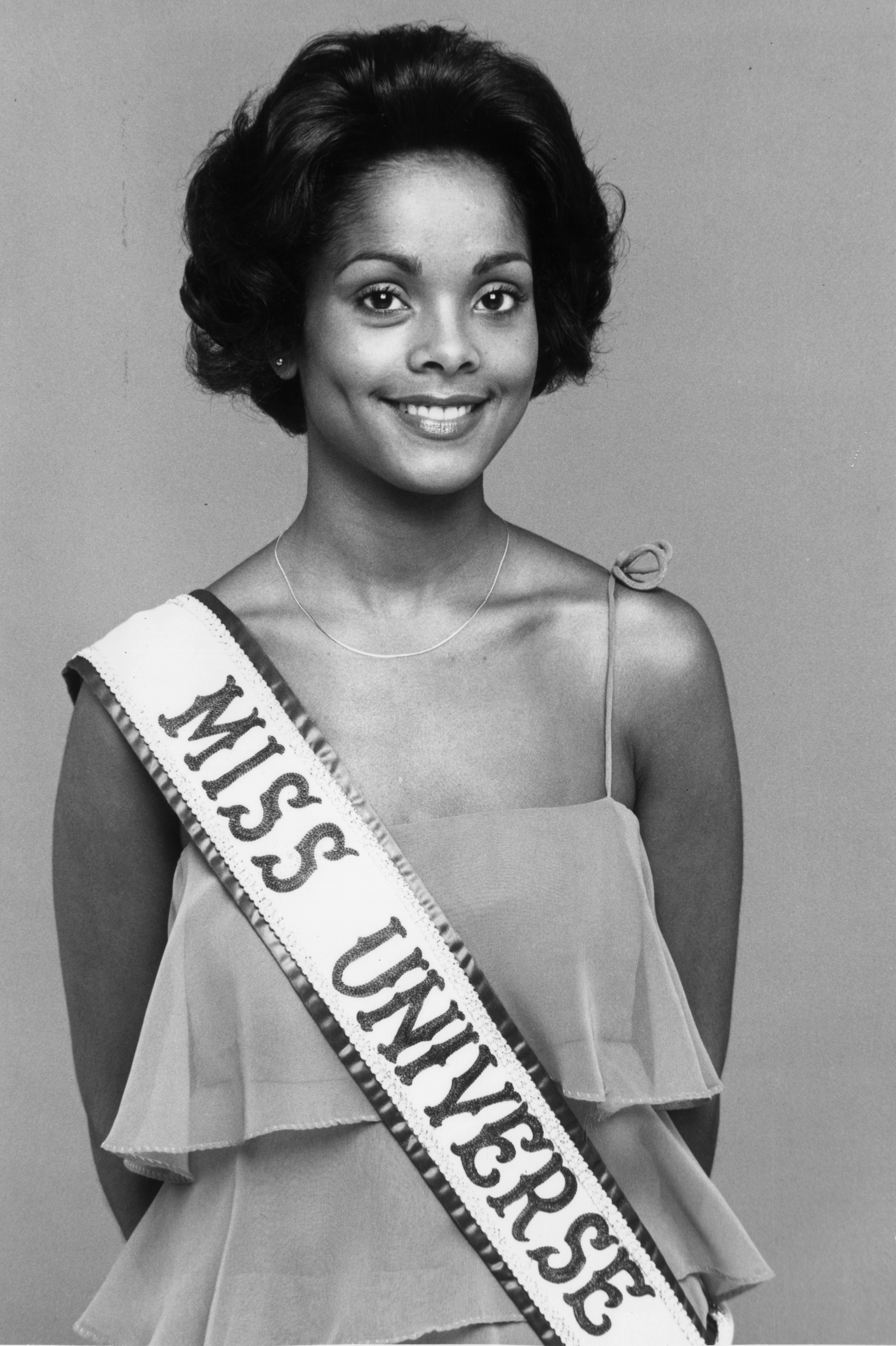
- Janelle Commissiong
- Date: 16 July 1977
- Presenters: Bob Barker; Helen O'Connell
- Entertainment: Trío Los Juglares; Fernando Casado
- Venue: National Theater, Santo Domingo, Dominican Republic
- Broadcaster: CBS (international); Color Visión (official broadcaster)
- Entrants: 80
- Placements: 12
- Debuts: Antigua; British Virgin Islands; French Guiana; Guadeloupe; Réunion; Saint Christopher-Nevis-Anguilla; Saint Lucia
- Withdrawals: Guatemala; Luxembourg; Turkey
- Returns: Belize; Haiti; Lebanon; Tahiti
- Winner: Janelle Commissiong; Trinidad and Tobago
- Congeniality: Pamela Mercer (Canada)
- Best National Costume: Kim Sung-hee (South Korea)
- Photogenic: Janelle Commissiong (Trinidad and Tobago)

Miss Universe 1977 was the 26th Miss Universe pageant, held at the National Theater in Santo Domingo, Dominican Republic, on 16 July 1977.

At the conclusion of the event, Rina Messinger of Israel crowned Janelle Commissiong of Trinidad and Tobago as Miss Universe 1977. This was the first time a black woman won Miss Universe. It is also the first victory of Trinidad and Tobago in the pageant's history.

Contestants from eighty countries and territories participated in this year's pageant. The pageant was hosted by Bob Barker in his eleventh consecutive year, while Helen O'Connell provided commentary and analysis throughout the event.

== Background ==
=== Location and date ===
On 16 January 1977, Miss Universe Inc. announced that the 26th edition of the competition would be held at the National Theater in Santo Domingo, Dominican Republic on 16 July 1977. The reason why Miss Universe was held in the Dominican Republic was to "open the Dominican Republic to the world".

=== Selection of participants ===
Contestants from eighty countries and territories were selected to compete in the pageant. One candidate was selected to replace the original dethroned winner.

==== Replacements ====
Femina Miss India 1977 runner-up Bineeta Bose was selected to represent India after the father of Femina Miss India 1977, Nalini Vishwanathan, did not allow his daughter to participate in Miss Universe.

==== Debuts, returns, and, withdrawals ====
This edition saw the debuts of Antigua, the British Virgin Islands, French Guiana, Guadeloupe, Réunion, Saint Christopher-Nevis-Anguilla, and Saint Lucia, and the returns of Tahiti which last competed in 1962; and Belize, Haiti, and Lebanon which last competed in 1975.

Marta Elisa Tirado of Guatemala and Jeannette Colling of Luxembourg withdrew for undisclosed reasons. Manolya Onur of Turkey withdrew because she had already participated twice. Patricia Vatble of Martinique was supposed to competed in this edition. However, Vatble was disqualified from the competition because she did not meet the age requirement.

== Results ==
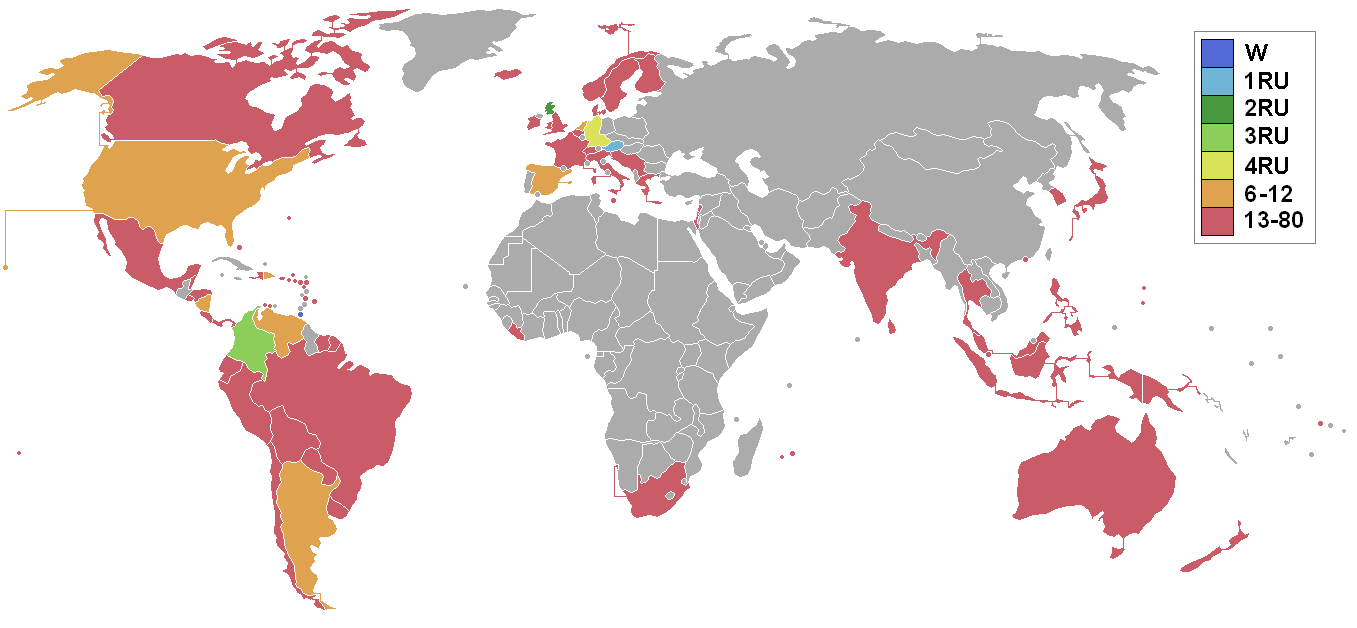
Miss Universe 1977 participating countries and territories.

=== Placements ===
Placement	Contestant
Miss Universe 1977	Trinidad and Tobago – Janelle Commissiong
1st Runner-Up	Austria – Eva Düringer
2nd Runner-Up	Scotland – Sandra Bell
3rd Runner-Up	Colombia – Aura María Mojica
4th Runner-Up	West Germany – Marie-Luise Gassen
Top 12	Argentina – Maritza Jurado; Dominican Republic – Blanca Sardiñas; Holland – Ineke Berends; Nicaragua – Beatriz Obregón; Spain – Luz Hernández; United States – Kimberly Tomes; Venezuela – Cristal Montañez

=== Special awards ===
Award	Contestant
Miss Amity	Canada – Pamela Mercer
Miss Photogenic	Trinidad and Tobago – Janelle Commissiong

==== Best National Costume ====
Placement	Contestant
Winner	South Korea – Sung-hee Kim
1st runner-up	Uruguay – Adriana Umpierre
2nd runner-up	Lebanon – Hyam Saadé

== Pageant ==
=== Format ===
Same with 1971, twelve semi-finalists were chosen at the preliminary competition that consists of the swimsuit and evening gown competition. The twelve semi-finalists participated in the casual interview, swimsuit, and evening gown competitions. From twelve, five finalists were shortlisted to advance to the final interview.

=== Selection committee ===
- J. Armando Bermudez – Dominican businessman
- Roberto Cavalli – Italian fashion designer
- Wilhelmina Cooper – Founder of Wilhelmina Models
- Linda Cristal – Argentine-American actress
- Robert Evans – American film producer
- Uri Geller – Israel-British illusionist
- Oscar de la Renta – Dominican fashion designer
- Howard W. Koch – American film producer and director
- Marisol Malaret – Miss Universe 1970 from Puerto Rico
- Gordon Parks – American photographer, writer, and musician
- Vidal Sassoon – British hairstylist
- Dionne Warwick – American singer

== Contestants ==
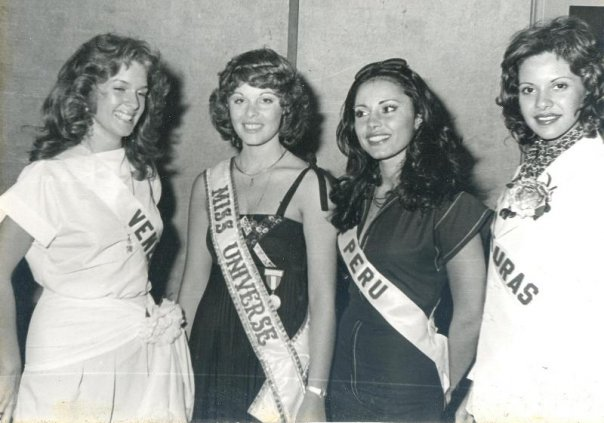
Miss Venezuela, Peru and Honduras with Miss Universe 1976, Rina Messinger.

Eighty contestants competed for the title.

Country/Territory	Contestant	Age (Note: Ages at the time of the pageant)	Hometown
American Samoa	Virginia Suka	17	Pago Pago
(Antigua and Barbuda) Antigua	Sheryl Gibbons	20	St. John's
Argentina	Maritza Jurado	24	La Plata
Aruba	Eldrith Oduber	22	Oranjestad
Australia	Jill Minaham	19	Melbourne
Austria	Eva Düringer	18	Bodensee
(The Bahamas) Bahamas	Paulette Borghardt	20	Nassau
Barbados	Margaret Rouse	18	Saint James
Belgium	Claudine Vasseur	18	Brussels
(British Honduras) Belize	Dora Phillips	18	Belmopan
Bermuda	Connie Frith	23	St. George's Parish
Bolivia	Liliana Gutiérrez	18	Santa Cruz de la Sierra
Brazil	Cássia Janys Silveira	21	Indaiatuba
British Virgin Islands	Andria Norman	21	Road Town
Canada	Pamela Mercer	20	Burnaby
Chile	Priscilla Brenner	18	Santiago
Colombia	Aura María Mojica	18	Valle de Cauca
Costa Rica	Claudia Garnier	18	San José
(Netherlands Antilles) Curaçao	Regine Tromp	22	Willemstad
Denmark	Inge Erlandsen	23	Copenhagen
Dominican Republic	Blanca Sardiñas	23	Santo Domingo
Ecuador	Lucía del Carmen Hernández	18	Chone
El Salvador	Altagracia Arévalo	19	San Salvador
England	Sarah Long	19	Bristol
Finland	Armi Aavikko	18	Helsinki
France	Véronique Fagot	17	Poitou
French Guiana	Evelyne Randel	17	Cayenne
French Polynesia	Donna Aunoa	20	Papeete
Greece	Maria Spantidaki	22	Athens
Guadeloupe	Catherine Reinette	18	Basse-Terre
Guam	Lisa Ann Caso	20	Agana
Haiti	Françoise Elie	19	Port-au-Prince
Holland	Ineke Berends	25	Amsterdam
Honduras	Carolina Rauscher	19	Siguatepeque
(British Hong Kong) Hong Kong	Loletta Chu	18	Hong Kong
Iceland	Kristjana Þrainsdóttir	24	Reykjavík
India	Bineeta Bose	18	Delhi
Indonesia	Siti Mirza Nuria Arifin	24	Palembang
Ireland	Jakki Moore	18	Dublin
Israel	Zehava Vardi	21	Haifa
Italy	Paola Biasini	22	Milan
Japan	Kyoko Sato	19	Tokyo
Lebanon	Hyam Saadé	18	Beirut
Liberia	Welma Campbell	21	Monrovia
Malaysia	Leong Li Ping	23	Ipoh
Malta	Jane Saliba	19	Żurrieq
Mauritius	Danielle Marie Bouic	22	Port Louis
Mexico	Felicia Mercado	17	Baja California
New Zealand	Donna Schultze	20	Auckland
Nicaragua	Beatriz Obregón	18	Rivas
Northern Mariana Islands	Margarita Camacho	19	Saipan
Norway	Åshild Ottesen	22	Oslo
Panama	Marina Valenciano	19	Panama City
Papua New Guinea	Sayah Karakuru	24	Port Moresby
Paraguay	María Leticia Zarza	17	Concepción
Peru	María Isabel Frías	22	Lima
Philippines	Anna Lorraine Kier	17	Baguio
Puerto Rico	Maria del Mar Rivera	20	Ponce
Réunion	Yolaine Morel	22	Saint-Denis
Saint Christopher-Nevis-Anguilla	Annette Frank	20	Basseterre
Saint Lucia	Iva-Lua Mendes	18	Castries
Scotland	Sandra Bell	18	Glasgow
Singapore	Marilyn Choon	17	Singapore
(Netherlands Antilles) Sint Maarten	Marie Boirard	19	Marigot
South Africa	Glynis Fester	19	Cape Town
South Korea	Sung-hee Kim	18	Seoul
Spain	Luz María Polegre	19	Tenerife
Sri Lanka	Sobodhini Nagesan	19	Colombo
Suriname	Marlene Saimo	19	Paramaribo
Sweden	Birgitta Lindvall	21	Luleå
Switzerland	Anja Terzi	17	Geneva
Thailand	Laddawan Intriya	19	Bangkok
Trinidad and Tobago	Janelle Commissiong	24	Port of Spain
United States	Kimberly Tomes	21	Houston
United States Virgin Islands	Denise George	17	Charlotte Amalie
Uruguay	Adriana Umpierre	19	Salto
Venezuela	Cristal Montañez	17	Caracas
Wales	Christine Murphy	23	Swansea
West Germany	Marie-Luise Gassen	24	Munich
Yugoslavia	Ljiljana Sobajić	22	Belgrade
