= Fabiola Pérez Rovirosa =

Mexican model and beauty pageant titleholder

- Born: Fabiola Pérez Rovirosa de Sánchez; Ciudad Juárez, Chuhuahua, Mexico
- Title: Señorita México 1993; Miss Hispanidad Internacional 1995; Mrs. Mexico 2002

Fabiola Pérez Rovirosa de Sánchez (born Ciudad Juárez, Chuhuahua, Mexico) is a Mexican model and beauty pageant titleholder.

== Pageantry ==
Fabiola gained national recognition after being crowned Señorita México 1993. Her reign took place during a transitional period in Mexico’s national pageant, shortly before the system evolved into what later became known as Nuestra Belleza México. She represented Mexico at Miss Universe 1994, held in Manila, Philippines, and did not place among the finalists. The following year, Fabiola competed and won Miss Hispanidad Internacional 1994, held in Florida, United States. In 2002, Fabiola returned to pageantry by representing Mexico at Mrs. World, where she finished as the second runner-up.

Awards and achievements
Preceded by (Russia) Kristina Tyrtychnikova	Mrs. World 2nd Runner-up; 2002	Succeeded by (Costa Rica) Ana Yancy González
Preceded by (Peru) Karina Calmet Brugnara	Miss Hispanidad Internacional; 1995	Succeeded by ——
Preceded by Angelina González Guerrero	Señorita México; 1993	Succeeded by Claudia Hernández Rodríguez
