= Lilia Cristina Serrano =

Mexican model and beauty pageant titleholder

- Born: Lilia Cristina Serrano Nájera; Chiapas, Mexico
- Height: 1.75 m (5 ft 9 in)
- Beauty pageant titleholder
- Hair color: Black
- Eye color: Brown
- Major competitions: Señorita México 1990 (Winner; Assumed); Miss International 1991 (Top 15) (Best National Costume)

Lilia Cristina Serrano Nájera (born Chiapas, Mexico) is a Mexican model and beauty pageant titleholder who represented her country in the Miss Internacional 1991 where she placed Top 15.

== Pageantry ==
Serrano began her pageant career by representing the state of Chiapas in the Señorita México 1990 pageant, where she finished as first runner-up. However, after Lupita Jones won the Miss Universe 1991 title, Serrano took on national representation duties. That same year, she represented Mexico at Miss International 1991, held in Tokyo, Japan. During the competition, Serrano achieved placed Top 15 and won the Best National Costume Award, standing out for her cultural representation of Mexico.

Awards and achievements
Preceded by Lupita Jones	Señorita México (Assumed); 1990	Succeeded by Monica Zúñiga
Preceded by (Bolivia) Giselle Greminger	Miss International Best National Costume; 1991	Succeeded by (Colombia) Lina María Marín
