= Cristal Montañez =

Venezuelan model (born 1960)

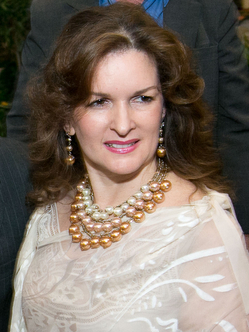
- Montañez in 2012
- Born: Cristal del Mar Montañez Arocha; 1960 (age 64–65); Caracas, Venezuela

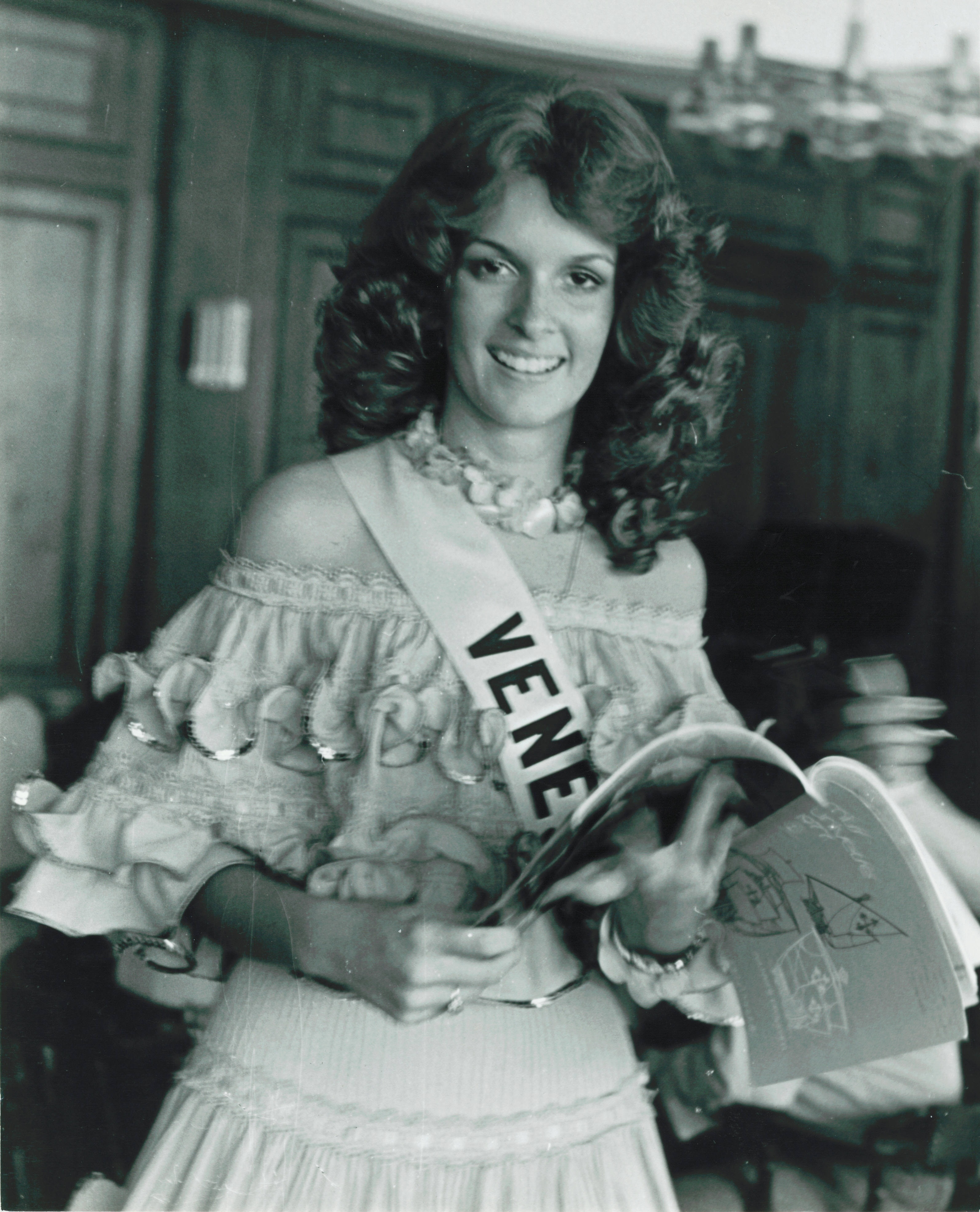
At the Miss Universe contest in 1977

Cristal del Mar Montañez Arocha (born 1960) is a Venezuelan politician and beauty pageant titleholder who was crowned Miss Venezuela 1977 and was a semi-finalist in the Miss Universe pageant.

During the presidency of Hugo Chavez she became active in politics. She participated in the Resistencia Civil de Venezolanos en el Exterior as an international coordinator, and was president of the International Venezuelan Council for Democracy from 2003 to 2008.

Preceded by Judith Castillo	Miss Venezuela; 1977	Succeeded by Marisol Alfonzo
