= Silvana Suárez =

Argentine model and beauty queen (1958–2022)

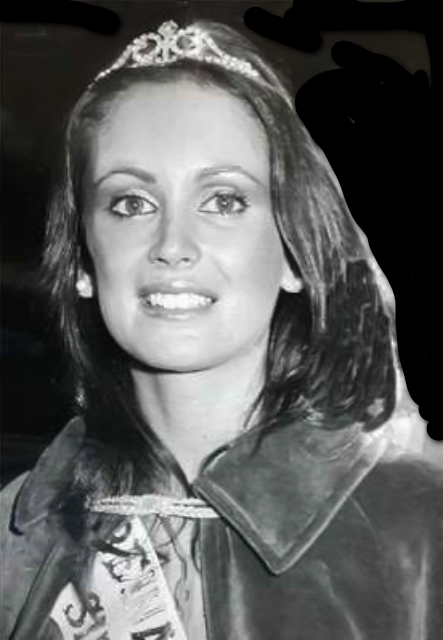
- Suárez in 1978
- Born: Silvana Rosa Suárez Clarence; 29 September 1958; Córdoba, Argentina
- Died: 21 October 2022 (aged 64); Nono, Córdoba, Argentina
- Beauty pageant titleholder
- Title: Miss Mundo Argentina 1978; Miss World 1978
- Major competitions: Miss Mundo Argentina 1978 (Winner); Miss World 1978 (Winner)

Silvana Rosa Suárez Clarence (Spanish pronunciation: [silˈβana ˈswaɾes]; 29 September 1958 – 21 October 2022) was an Argentine model and beauty queen who won the Miss World 1978 contest, representing Argentina. The pageant was held in London, United Kingdom.

Suárez became the second Argentine to win the title of World Beauty Queen.

== Biography ==
From the middle class, Suárez's parents were both artists and divorced when she was a teen. She lived then with her mother, a teacher of Fine Arts, and after finishing High School, studied Architecture. "Was my mom who insisted that I attend a beauty pageant. I won the Miss Sierras de Córdoba and later the Miss World", she said in 2019.

Suárez died from colon cancer on 21 October 2022, at the age of 64.

== Miss World 1978 ==
At age 19, Suárez beat 67 other contestants and was crowned Miss World 1978 at the Royal Albert Hall in London. "And then all the possibilities: I would live in London and would travel around the world", she said.

== Life after Miss World ==
After her reign, Suárez traveled and worked as a model for a decade, visiting countries such as Japan and Thailand. "I loved the adventure, but I felt lonely because there were not all the technologies as today to speak with family and friends".

In 1988 Suárez married media businessman Julio Ramos and had two children, Julia and Augusto. The couple divorced years later. She said that he was very chauvinistic. "He wanted to control me and that disease got worse year after year".

Suárez posed nude for Playboy in 1980.

Awards and achievements
Preceded by (Sweden) Mary Stävin	Miss World; 1978	Succeeded by (Bermuda) Gina Swainson
