= Claudia Hernández (Mexican model) =

Mexican model and beauty pageant titleholder

- Born: Claudia Hernández Rodríguez; Santiago Ixcuintla, Nayarit, Mexico
- Title: Señorita México 1994; Miss World Mexico 1994; Miss Maja International 1995

Claudia Hernández Rodríguez (born Santiago Ixcuintla, Nayarit, Mexico) is a Mexican model and beauty pageant titleholder. Hernández began her pageant career by representing the state of Nayarit in the Señorita México 1994 pageant. She won the title national, and the right to represent Mexico in international competitions. Hernández represented Mexico at Miss World 1994, in Sun City, South Africa, and did not place among the finalists.

The following year, Hernández competed in the Miss Maja International 1995, held in Mayagüez, Puerto Rico. She became the only Mexican to win the Miss Maja International crown in the pageant's 30-year history.

Awards and achievements
Preceded by Beata Szyszkowska	Miss Maja International; 1995	Succeeded by Sandra Milena
Preceded by Elizabeth Margain	Miss World Mexico; 1994	Succeeded by Alejandra Quintero
Preceded by Fabiola Pérez Rovirosa	Señorita México; 1994	Succeeded by Sandra Sosa Nasta
