= Miss International 1991 =

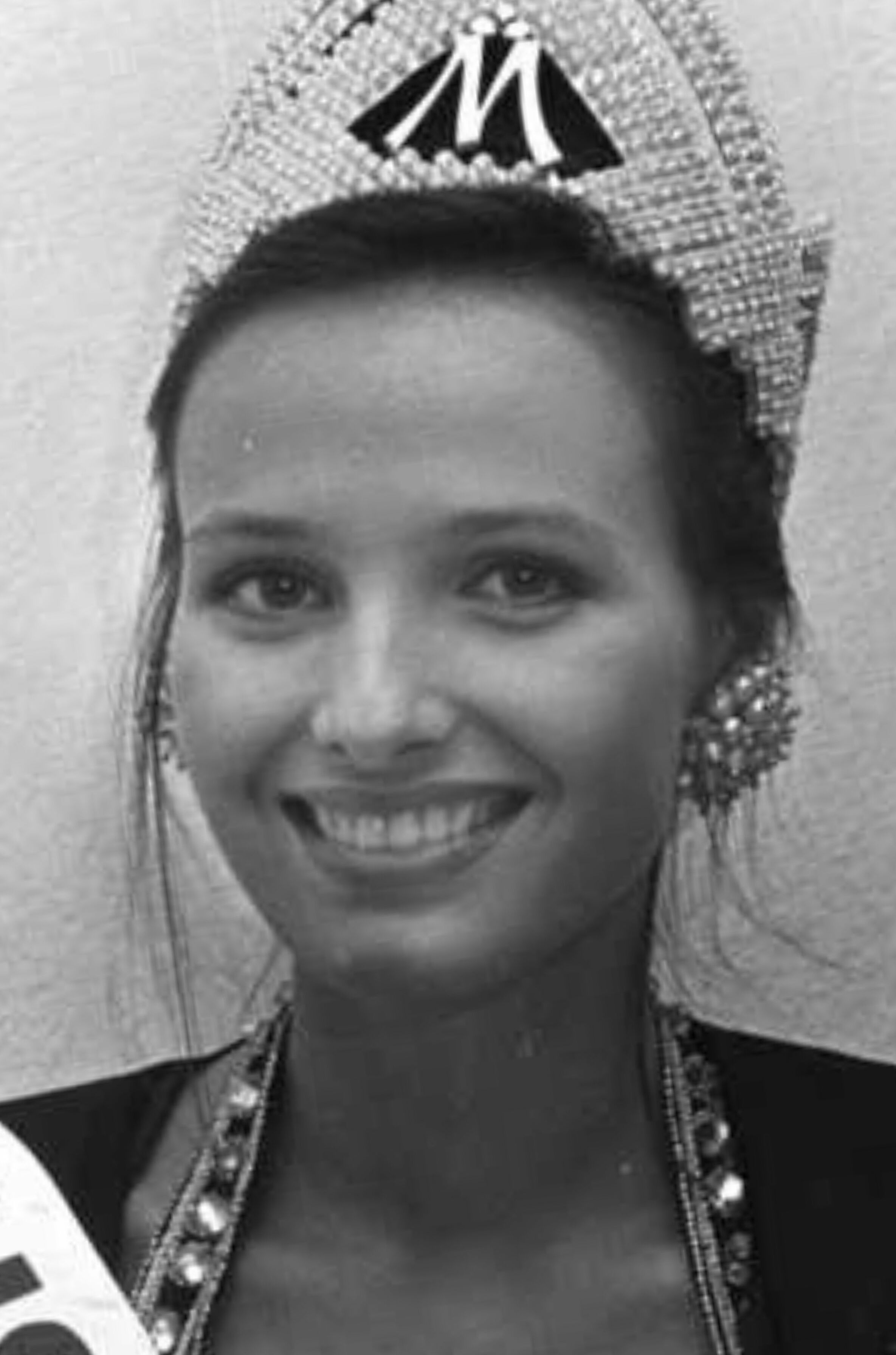
- Kotlarska in 1991
- Date: October 13 1991
- Presenters: Masumi Okada †
- Venue: Koseinenkin Kaikan Hall, Tokyo, Japan
- Broadcaster: TV Tokyo
- Entrants: 51
- Placements: 15
- Debuts: Hungary
- Withdrawals: Nigeria; Sri Lanka; Thailand; Union of Soviet Socialist Republics
- Returns: India; New Caledonia; Paraguay; Tahiti
- Winner: Agnieszka Kotlarska †; Poland

Miss International 1991, the 31st Miss International pageant, was held on October 13, 1991 at the Koseinenkin Kaikan Hall, Tokyo, Japan.

At the end of the event, Silvia de Esteban of Spain crowned Agnieszka Kotlarska of Poland as Miss International 1991. This is Poland's first ever Miss International crown.

Contestants from 51 countries and territories competed in this year's pageant. The competition was hosted by Masumi Okada.

== Results ==
=== Placements ===
Placement	Contestant
Miss International 1991	Poland - Agnieszka Kotlarska †
1st Runner-Up	France - Catherine Clarysse
2nd Runner-Up	Czechoslovakia - Marketa Silna
Top 15	Australia - Melinda Boundy; Brazil - Lisiane Braile; Colombia - Mónica Escobar; Great Britain - Helen Upton; India - Preeti Mankotia; Italy - Mikaela Monari; Japan - Miho Takata; Mexico - Lilia Cristina Serrano; New Zealand - Nicola Jane Dean; Philippines - Maria Patricia Betita; South Korea - Kwon Jung-joo; Spain - Elodie Chantal

=== Special awards ===
Award	Contestant
Miss Friendship	Poland - Agnieszka Kotlarska
Miss Photogenic	France - Catherine Clarysse
Best National Costume	Mexico - Lilia Cristina Serrano

== Contestants ==
- Argentina - Verónica Marcela Caldi
- Australia - Melinda Sue Boundy
- Austria - Regina Kozak
- Belgium - Stéphanie Dermaux
- Bolivia - Rosmy Tamara Pol
- Brazil - Lisiane Bolsani Braile
- Canada - Robin Elizabeth Nardi
- Colombia - Mónica Maria Escobar Freydell
- Costa Rica - Eugenie Jiménez Pacheco
- Czechoslovakia - Marketa Silna
- Denmark - Malene Christensen
- Dominican Republic - Melissa Vargas
- Finland - Päivi Hytinkoski
- France - Catherine Anne Marie Clarysse
- Germany - Katrin Richter
- Great Britain - Helen Upton
- Greece - Dimitra Papadogianni
- Guam - Norma Jean Cepeda
- Guatemala - Gloria Elizabeth Comparini
- Hawaii - Tamme Strickland
- Holland - Marjanna Kraayenveld
- Honduras - Marly Karina Prudoth Guzmán
- Hong Kong - Valerie Chow Ka-Ling
- Hungary - Kinga Czuczor
- Iceland - Solveig Kristjansdóttir
- India - Preeti Mankotia
- Ireland - Susan Brady
- Israel - Efrat Bruner
- Italy - Mikaela Monari
- Japan - Miho Takata
- Luxembourg - Annette Feydt
- Mexico - Lilia Cristina Serrano Nájera
- New Caledonia - Valerie Anne Delrieu
- New Zealand - Nicola Jane Dean
- Northern Mariana Islands - Christina Rasa Salas
- Norway - Hege Cathrin Baardsen
- Panama - Jessica Inés Lacayo
- Paraguay - Maria Luján Oviedo
- Philippines - Maria Patricia Betita
- Poland - Agnieszka Kotlarska †
- Portugal - Gisela Galhavano
- Puerto Rico - Lizaura Quiñones Torres
- Singapore - Audrey Siok Ling Tan
- South Korea - Kwon Jung-joo
- Spain - Elodie Chantal Jordá de Quay
- Sweden - Charlotte Victoria Wallden
- Switzerland - Francesca Centamore
- Tahiti - Rebecca Herenui Touaitahuata
- Turkey - Defne Samyeli
- United States - Kimberly Anne Byers
- Venezuela - Niurka Auristela Acevedo
