= Alejandra Quintero =

Mexican marketing executive, former model, and beauty pageant titleholder

- Born: Alejandra Aidee Quintero Velasco; September 26, 1976 (age 50); Monterrey, Nuevo León, Mexico
- Occupations: Marketing executive, model
- Beauty pageant titleholder
- Title: Nuestra Belleza Mundo México 1995
- Major competitions: Nuestra Belleza Mundo México 1995 (Winner) & Miss World 1995 (Top 10)

Alejandra Aidee Quintero Velasco (born September 26, 1976) is a Mexican marketing executive, former model, and beauty pageant titleholder.

She studied marketing at Universidad Regiomontana.

== Pageantry ==
At the age of 19, Quintero represented the Mexican state of Nuevo León and was the first winner of the Miss Mundo Mexico title, as well as being the first Neoleonesa to win. The pageant was held in Toluca, Estado de México, Mexico on October 22, 1995.

She was crowned by the outgoing Nuestra Belleza México titleholder, Luz María Zetina. She was the very first titleholder from Nuestra Belleza Mundo Mexico to go on to represent Mexico at the Miss World pageant. This was the first year that the Miss World franchise had been licensed to Televisa, allowing the pageant to send representatives to this event, in addition to Miss Universe.

Quintero represented her country and placed in the semi-finals at Miss World 1995 pageant, held in Sun City, South Africa on November 18, 1995. She was the first contestant to represent Mexico in fifteen years and wrote about her experiences in a diary. Due to the recent acquisition of the Miss World license, Quintero only had five weeks to prepare for Miss World after winning Nuestra Belleza Mundo México. While Quintero did not win, she made it to the top 10 and met South African President Nelson Mandela, which she described at the time as one of the most significant moments of her life.

== Personal life ==
After Quintero competed in Miss World 1995, she became the face of Canal de las Estrellas, before beginning her career in marketing. For 9 months between 2002 and 2003, she was briefly married to the singer and actor Jan.

Today, she lives in Monterrey, Nuevo León with her husband, Jorge López, and their twin sons. Quintero has over twenty years of experience as an international marketing executive and is currently the Chief Marketing Officer of Holcim México.

Awards and achievements
Preceded by Claudia Hernández Rodríguez	Nuestra Belleza Mundo México; 1995	Succeeded by Yessica Salazar González
