= Alamjeet Kaur Chauhan =

Indian lawyer and former model

- Born: 1955 (age 70–71); Punjab, India
- Occupations: Model, lawyer
- Height: 1.73 m (5 ft 8 in)
- Beauty pageant titleholder
- Title: Femina Miss India Universe 1978
- Years active: 1974-present
- Major competitions: Femina Miss India 1978 (Winner) (Miss Beautiful Smile); Miss Universe 1978 (Best National Costume)

Alamjeet Kaur Chauhan is an Indian lawyer, former model and beauty pageant titleholder. She was crowned Femina Miss India 1978.

== Early life and career ==
She was born in Punjab in 1955. In 1978, she entered the Femina Miss India contest and won the title. She was also declared the winner of Miss Beautiful Smile sub-award at the pageant. She represented India in the Miss Universe 1978 pageant where she won the Best National Costume Award. After completing her one-year tenure with Femina Miss India she returned to pursue her career as a lawyer.

Preceded by Bineeta Bose	Femina Miss India Universe; 1978	Succeeded by Swaroop Sampat
