= Miss Universe 1978 =

27th Miss Universe pageant

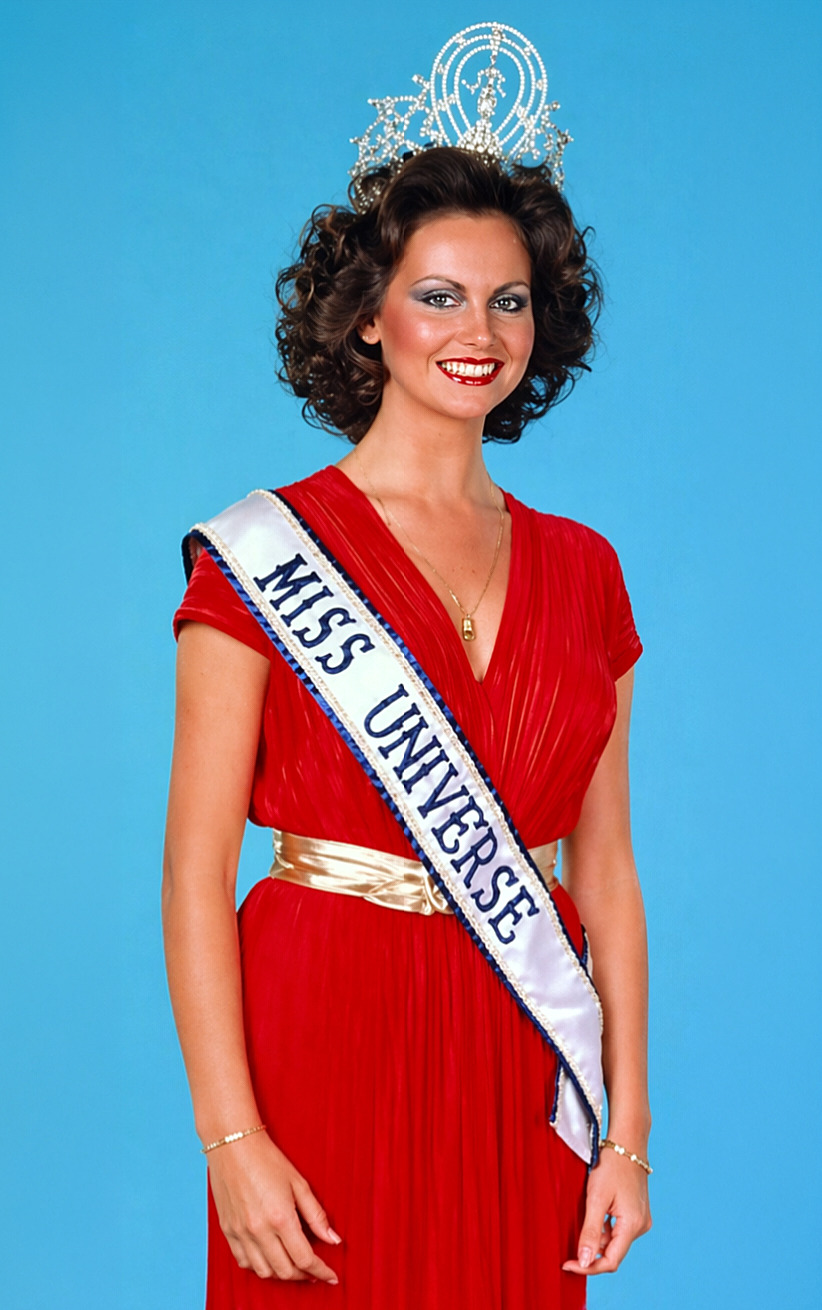
- Margaret Gardiner
- Date: 24 July 1978
- Presenters: Bob Barker; Helen O'Connell
- Entertainment: Robert Goulet; Violines Mágicos de Villafontana
- Venue: Centro de Convenciones de Acapulco, Acapulco, Mexico
- Broadcaster: CBS (international); Televisa (official broadcaster)
- Entrants: 75
- Placements: 12
- Debuts: Lesotho; New Hebrides
- Withdrawals: Antigua; British Virgin Islands; French Guiana; Guadeloupe; Haiti; Indonesia; Liberia; Mauritius; Saint Kitts; Saint Lucia; Sint Maarten; Yugoslavia
- Returns: Bonaire; Guatemala; Morocco; Saint Vincent; Turkey
- Winner: Margaret Gardiner; South Africa
- Congeniality: Sophia Titus (Trinidad and Tobago)
- Best National Costume: Alamjeet Kaur Chauhan (India)
- Photogenic: Maribel Guardia (Costa Rica)

Miss Universe 1978 was the 27th Miss Universe pageant, held at the Centro de Convenciones de Acapulco in Acapulco, Mexico, on 24 July 1978.

At the conclusion of the event, Janelle Commissiong of Trinidad and Tobago crowned Margaret Gardiner of South Africa as Miss Universe 1978. This is first victory of South Africa in the pageant's history.

Contestants from seventy-five countries and territories participated in this year's pageant. The pageant was hosted by Bob Barker in his twelfth consecutive year, while Helen O'Connell provided commentary and analysis throughout the event.

== Background ==
=== Location and date ===
In a statement by Griff O'Neill of the Miss Universe Inc. in October 1976, it was stated that Singapore was one of the locations being considered for the Miss Universe pageant in 1978. According to the Singapore Tourist Promotion Board, although they were interested in hosting the Miss Universe pageant for Singapore's publicity, they were also considering whether the expense was proportionate to the promotional impact they would get, and its importance.

Two months after announcing that Miss Universe 1977 would be held in the Dominican Republic, Mexican Minister of Tourism Guillermo Rosell de La Lama announced on 11 March 1977 that the Miss Universe 1978 pageant would be held in Acapulco, Mexico on 24 July 1978 after Miss Universe accepted Mexico's invitation.

=== Selection of participants ===
Contestants from seventy-five countries and territories were selected to compete in the pageant. Two candidates were selected to replace the original dethroned winner.

==== Replacements ====
Miss Canada 1977 runner-up Andrea Eng was appointed to represent Canada after Catherine Swing stepped down as Miss Canada 1977 to get married. Miss France 1978 first runner-up Brigitte Konjovic was appointed to represent France after Miss France 1978 Pascale Taurua chose to return to her hometown of New Caledonia instead of living in France.

==== Debuts, returns, and, withdrawals ====
This edition saw the debuts of Lesotho and New Hebrides, and the returns of Saint Vincent which last competed in 1964; Bonaire which last competed in 1969; Morocco which last competed in 1975; and Guatemala and Turkey which last competed in 1976.

Nadine Defraites of Antigua, Mlue Debor of Guadeloupe, and Ingrid Desmarais of Mauritius withdrew for undisclosed reasons.

== Results ==
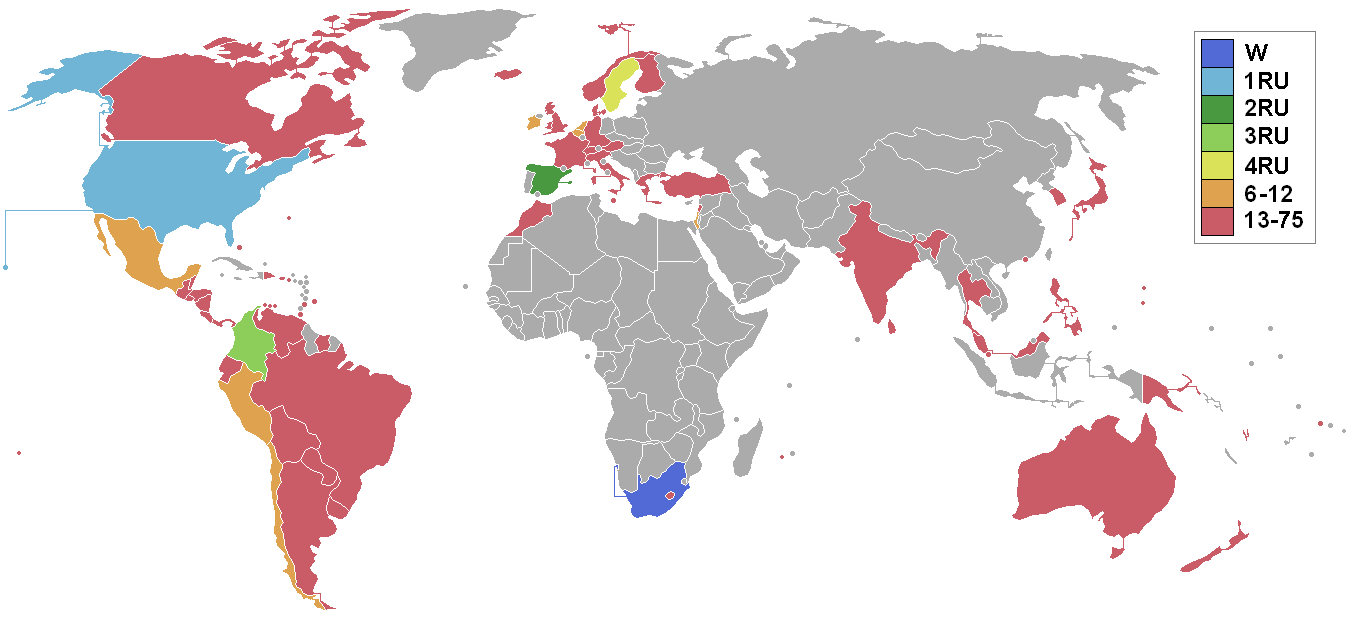
Miss Universe 1978 participating nations and results

=== Placements ===
Placement	Contestant
Miss Universe 1978	South Africa – Margaret Gardiner
1st Runner-Up	United States – Judi Andersen
2nd Runner-Up	Spain – Guillermina Ruiz
3rd Runner-Up	Colombia – Shirley Saenz
4th Runner-Up	Sweden – Cécilia Rodhe
Top 12	Belgium – Françoise Moens; Chile – Marianne Müller; Holland – Karen Gustafsson; Ireland – Lorraine Enriquez; Israel – Dorit Jellinek; Mexico – Alba Margarita Cervera; Peru – Olga Zumaran

== Pageant ==
=== Format ===
Same with 1971, twelve semi-finalists were chosen at the preliminary competition that consists of the swimsuit and evening gown competition. The twelve semi-finalists participated in the casual interview, swimsuit, and evening gown competitions. From twelve, five finalists were shortlisted to advance to the final interview. This edition also marks the first time that the scores given by the judges are broadcast on television.

=== Judges ===
The following celebrities judged the final competition:

- Christiane Martel – Miss Universe 1953 from France
- Dewi Sukarno – Japanese socialite and former first lady of Indonesia
- David Merrick – Tony Award-winning American theatrical producer
- Line Renaud – French singer and actress
- Miloš Forman – Film director from Czechoslovakia
- Ursula Andress – Swiss actress and sex symbol of the 1960s
- Melba Moore – American singer
- Roberto Cavalli – Italian fashion designer
- Wilhelmina Cooper – Founder of Wilhelmina Models
- Anna Moffo – American opera singer
- Mario Moreno – Mexican comedian and stage and film actor

== Contestants ==
Seventy-five contestants competed for the title.

Country/Territory	Contestant	Age (Note: Ages at the time of the pageant)	Hometown
American Samoa	Palepa Sio Tauliili	21	Pago Pago
Argentina	Delia Muñoz	17	Buenos Aires
Aruba	Margarita Tromp	26	Oranjestad
Australia	Beverley Pinder	23	Melbourne
Austria	Doris Anwander	18	Bregenz
(The Bahamas) Bahamas	Dulcie Millings	18	Nassau
Barbados	Judy Miller	20	Saint Michael
Belgium	Françoise Moens	18	Brussels
(British Honduras) Belize	Christina Ysaguirre	20	Belmopan
Bermuda	Madeline Joell	19	Smith's Parish
Bolivia	Raquel Roca	18	Guayaramerín
(Netherlands Antilles) Bonaire	Corinne Hernandez	19	Kralendijk
Brazil	Suzana Araújo	20	Dionísio
Canada	Andrea Eng	22	Vancouver
Chile	Marianne Müller	18	Santiago
Colombia	Shirley Sáenz	18	Bogotá
Costa Rica	Maribel Fernández	19	San José
(Netherlands Antilles) Curaçao	Solange de Castro	20	Willemstad
Denmark	Anita Heske	20	Copenhagen
Dominican Republic	Raquel Josefina Jacobo	17	San Cristóbal
Ecuador	Mabel Ceballos	18	Guayaquil
El Salvador	Iris Mazorra	18	San Salvador
England	Beverly Isherwood	19	Bolton
Finland	Seija Paakkola	19	Oulu
France	Brigitte Konjovic	18	Paris
French Polynesia	Pascaline Tumia Teriireoo	19	Papeete
Greece	Marieta Kountouraki	21	Thessaloniki
Guam	Mary Lois Sampson	22	Mangilao
Guatemala	Claudia María Iriarte	20	Guatemala City
Holland	Karen Gustafsson	21	Rotterdam
Honduras	Olimpia Velásquez	20	Tegucigalpa
(British Hong Kong) Hong Kong	Winnie Chan	22	Kowloon
Iceland	Anna Björk Edwards	19	Reykjavík
India	Alamjeet Kaur Chauhan	23	New Delhi
Ireland	Lorraine Enriquez	19	Dublin
Israel	Dorit Jellinek	19	Haifa
Italy	Andreina Mazzoti	21	Brescia
Japan	Hisako Manda	20	Osaka
Lebanon	Reine Antoine Semaan	17	Beirut
Lesotho	Joan Libuseng Khoali	21	Maseru
Malaysia	Yasmin Yusuff	22	Kuala Lumpur
Malta	Pauline Farrugia	22	Żebbuġ
Mexico	Alba Margarita Cervera	19	Yucatan
Morocco	Majida Tazi	18	Rabat
New Hebrides	Christine Spooner	18	Luganville
New Zealand	Jane Simmonds	21	Auckland
Nicaragua	Claudia Herrera	19	Masaya
Northern Mariana Islands	Julias Salas Concepción	17	Saipan
Norway	Jeanette Aarum	19	Oslo
Panama	Diana Leticia Conte	20	Panama City
Papua New Guinea	Angelyn Muta Tukana	21	Bougainville
Paraguay	Rosa María Duarte	26	Asunción
Peru	Olga Zumarán	19	Lima
Philippines	Jennifer Cortes	17	Manila
Puerto Rico	Ada Perkins	18	San Juan
Réunion	Evelyn Pongerand	19	La Possession
(Saint Vincent and the Grenadines) Saint Vincent	Gailene Collin	22	Kingstown
Scotland	Angela McLeod	20	Fife
Singapore	Annie Lee	20	Singapore
South Africa	Margaret Gardiner	18	Cape Town
South Korea	Jung-eun Shon	23	Seoul
Spain	Guillermina Ruiz	21	Barcelona
Sri Lanka	Dlirukshi Wimalasooriya	27	Colombo
Suriname	Garrance Rustwijk	18	Paramaribo
Sweden	Cécilia Rodhe	17	Gothenburg
Switzerland	Sylvia von Arx	20	Appenzell Innerrhoden
Thailand	Pornpit Sakornvijit	23	Bangkok
Trinidad and Tobago	Sophia Titus	18	Port of Spain
Turkey	Billur Lutfiye Bingol	19	Istanbul
United States	Judi Andersen	20	Honolulu
United States Virgin Islands	Barbara Henderson	23	Christiansted
Uruguay	María del Carmen da Rosa	21	Salto
Venezuela	Marisol Alfonzo	21	Caracas
Wales	Elizabeth Ann Jones	20	Welshpool
West Germany	Eva Marie Gabrielle Gottschalk	26	Berlin
