= Miss World 1978 =

28th Miss World pageant

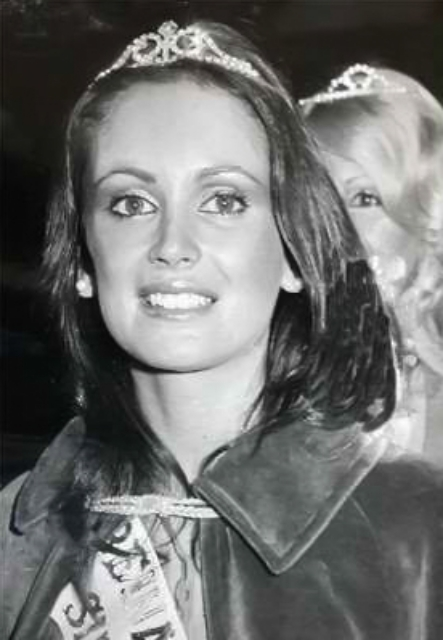
- Silvana Suárez
- Date: 16 November 1978
- Presenters: Paul Burnett; Sacha Distel
- Venue: Royal Albert Hall, London, United Kingdom
- Broadcaster: BBC
- Entrants: 68
- Placements: 15
- Debuts: Dominica; Saint Vincent
- Withdrawals: Bolivia; Lebanon; Luxembourg; Nicaragua; Panama; Papua New Guinea; South Africa
- Returns: India; Italy; Jamaica; Malaysia; Mauritius; Nigeria; Philippines; Singapore; Swaziland; Tunisia; United States Virgin Islands
- Winner: Silvana Suárez; Argentina

Miss World 1978 was the 28th edition of the Miss World pageant, held at the Royal Albert Hall in London, United Kingdom on 16 November 1978.

At the conclusion of the event, Mary Stävin of Sweden crowned Silvana Suárez of Argentina as the new Miss World, this was the second time Argentina has won Miss World.

Contestants from sixty-eight countries and territories competed in this year's pageant. The pageant was hosted by Paul Burnett and Sascha Distel. Distel also performed in this year's pageant.

== Background ==
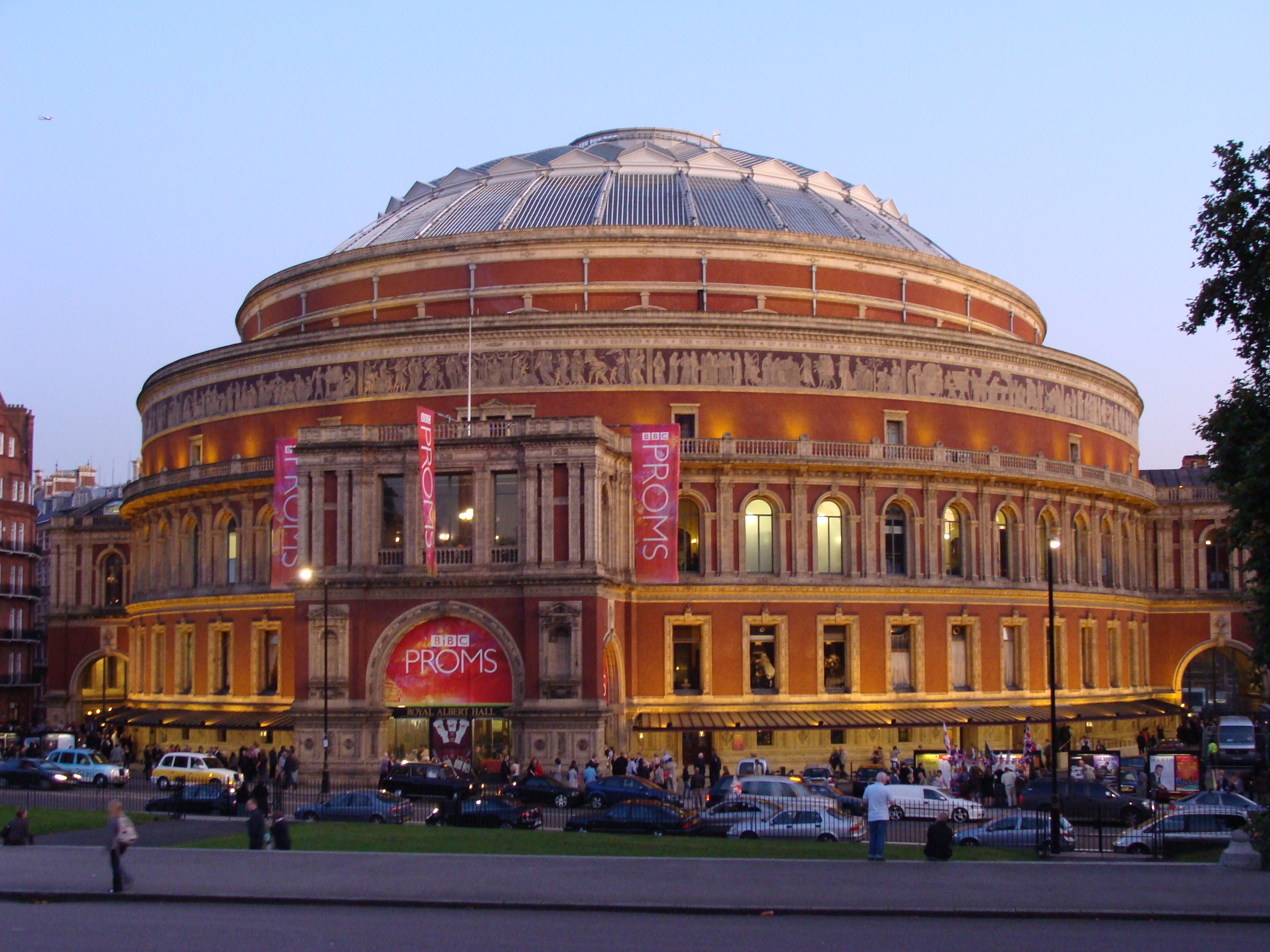
Royal Albert Hall, the location of Miss World 1978

=== Selection of participants ===
Contestants from sixty-eight countries and territories were selected to compete in the pageant. Two candidates were appointed to their position to replace the original dethroned winner.

==== Replacements ====
Silvana Suárez, the first runner-up of Miss Argentina 1978, was appointed to represent her country at Miss World after the original winner, Margarita Susana Heindrycks, was disqualified for being underage. Pascale Taurua was originally crowned Miss France 1978 and was to compete internationally. However, she decided to return to homeland rather than taking the title, and the title was given to Brigitte Konjovic, the first runner-up. Due to personal reasons, Konjovic was dethroned as Miss France, and the title of Miss France 1978 was given to the second runner-up Kelly Hoarau.

Malek Nemlaghi of Tunisia was initially disqualified after refusing to remove her yashmak and wear boxer shorts for the official photo-call. However, she was reinstated back into the competition after she agreed to remove her yashmak at the dress rehearsal.

==== Debuts, returns, and withdrawals ====
The 1978 edition saw the debuts of Dominica and Saint Vincent and the return of India, Italy, Jamaica, Malaysia, Mauritius, Nigeria, Philippines, Singapore, Swaziland, Tunisia, and the Virgin Islands. Nigeria, which last competed in 1970, India, Malaysia, Mauritius, the Philippines, Swaziland, and Tunisia last competed in 1975, While, Italy, Jamaica, Singapore and the United States Virgin Islands (Note: Competed as Virgin Islands) last competed in 1976.

Bolivia, Lebanon, Luxembourg, Nicaragua, Panama, Papua New Guinea, and South Africa withdrew in this edition. Angelyn Tukana of Papua New Guinea withdrew due to lack of funding. Yolanda Kloppers of South Africa did not compete after the Miss World Organization decided to ban the country from competing due to its apartheid policy.

== Results ==
=== Placements ===
Placement	Contestant
Miss World 1978	Argentina – Silvana Suárez
1st runner-up	Sweden – Ossie Carlsson
2nd runner-up	Australia – Denise Ellen Coward
3rd runner-up	Mexico – Martha Eugenia Ortíz
4th runner-up	Spain – Gloria Valenciano
Top 7	Switzerland – Jeanette Keller; United Kingdom – Ann Jones
Top 15	Austria – Doris Anwander; Costa Rica – Maribel Guardia; Finland – Eija Laaksonen; India – Kalpana Iyer; Puerto Rico – María Jesús Cañizares; Sri Lanka – Manohori Vanigasooriya; United States – Debra Jean Freeze; Venezuela – Patricia Tóffoli

=== Special awards ===
Award	Winner
Miss Photogenic	Mexico – Martha Eugenia Ortíz
Miss Talent	Philippines – Louvette Hammond

== Contestants ==
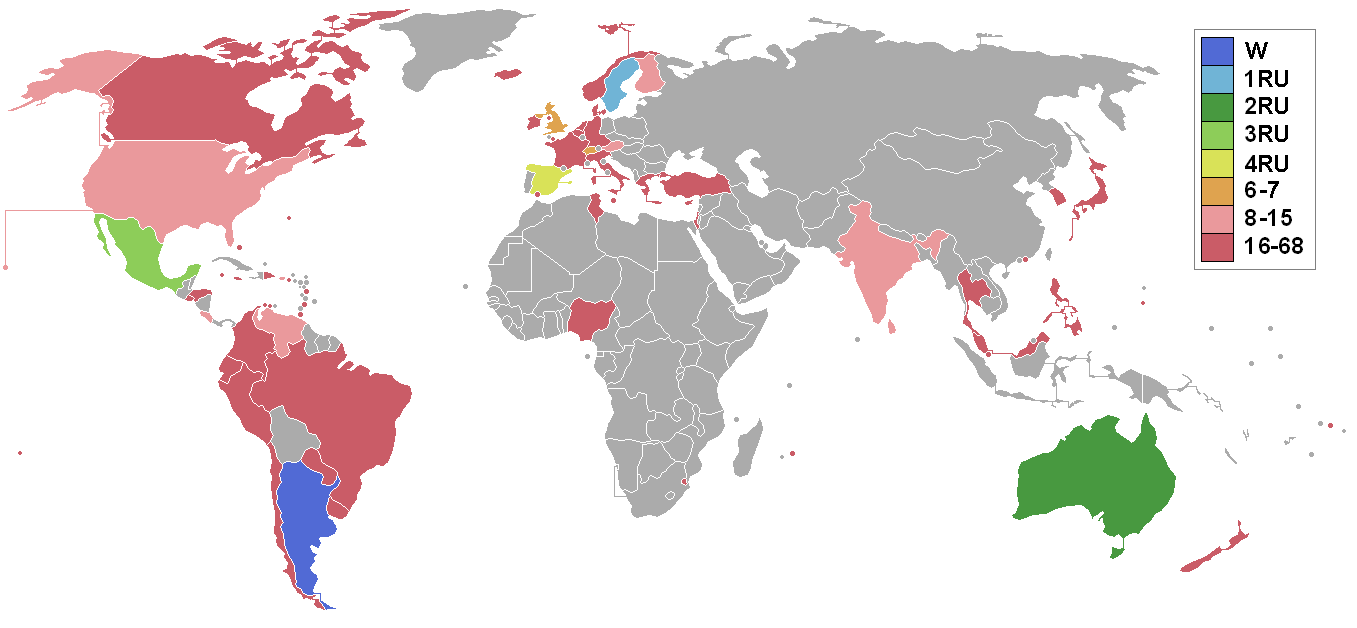
Countries and territories which sent delegates and results

Sixty-eight contestants competed for the tile.

Country/Territory	Contestant	Age (Note: Ages at the time of the pageant)	Hometown
Argentina	Silvana Suárez	20	Córdoba
(Netherlands Antilles) Aruba	Rose-Anne Lejuez	18	Oranjestad
Australia	Denise Coward	23	Parkdale
Austria	Doris Anwander	18	Bregenz
(The Bahamas) Bahamas	Donna Marie McCook	23	Nassau
Belgium	Françoise Moens	18	Brussels
Bermuda	Madeline Francine Joell	19	Smith's Parish
Brazil	Laura Angélica Viana Pereira	20	Salvador
Canada	Brigitte June Hofmann	18	Hamilton
Cayman Islands	Wendy Lorraine Daykin	18	George Town
Chile	Trinidad Sepúlveda	22	Santiago
Colombia	Denise de Castro Santiago	19	Barranquilla
Costa Rica	Maribel Guardia	19	San José
(Netherlands Antilles) Curaçao	Silvana Angely Trinidad	21	Willemstad
Cyprus	Mary Adamou	19	Nicosia
Denmark	Birgit Stefansen	21	Struer
Dominica	Mona Jno-Lewis	19	Roseau
Dominican Republic	Jenny Polanco	20	Puerto Plata
Ecuador	Antonieta Campódonico	18	Guayaquil
El Salvador	Iris Mazorra	18	San Salvador
Finland	Eija Laaksonen	22	Tampere
France	Kelly Hoarau	18	Le Port
French Polynesia (Note: Competed as Tahiti in the pageant)	Moeata Schmouker	18	Puna'auia
Gibraltar	Rosanna Bonfante	17	Gibraltar
Greece	Ariana Dimitropoulou	23	Athens
Guam	Elizabeth Clara Tenorio	22	Asan
(Netherlands) Holland	Ans van Haaster	22	Amsterdam
Honduras	María Elena Bobadilla	21	San Pedro Sula
(British Hong Kong) Hong Kong	Faustina Lin	22	Hong Kong Island
Iceland	Ásdís Loftsdóttir	20	Vestmannaeyjar
India	Kalpana Iyer	22	Amroha
(Republic of Ireland) Ireland	Lorraine O'Connor	24	Cork
Isle of Man	Carole Ann Kneale	20	Douglas
Israel	Sari Alon	19	Tiberias
Italy	Loren Cristina Mai	17	Mantua
Jamaica	Joan McDonald	22	Kingston
Japan	Yuko Yamaguchi	21	Tokyo
Jersey	Chantal Gosselin	21	Saint Helier
Malaysia	Kartina Osir	22	Sandakan
Malta	Mary Cumbo	18	Birkirkara
Mauritius	Genevieve Chanea	19	Curepipe
Mexico	Martha Eugenia Ortíz	18	Mexico City
New Zealand	Lorian Tangney	20	Hamilton
Nigeria	Irene Omagbemi	20	Lagos
Norway	Elisabet Klaeboe	17	Oslo
Paraguay	Susana Galli	19	Asunción
Peru	Karen Noeth	18	Lima
Philippines	Louvette Monzon Hammond	17	Quezon City
Puerto Rico	María Jesús Cañizares	21	San Juan
(Saint Vincent and the Grenadines) Saint Vincent	June de Nobriga	23	Kingstown
Singapore	Rosie Tan	21	Singapore
South Korea (Note: Competed as Korea in the pageant)	Je Eun-jin	19	Seoul
Spain	Gloria Valenciano	23	Tenerife
Sri Lanka	Manohori Vanigasooriya	20	Colombo
(Eswatini) Swaziland	Nyamalele Nilovu	21	Mbabane
Sweden	Ossie Carlsson	21	Stockholm
Switzerland	Jeannette Keller	20	Zürich
Thailand	Orasa Panichapan	20	Bangkok
Trinidad and Tobago	Kathleen Thomas	21	Port of Spain
Tunisia	Malek Nemlaghi	19	Tunis
Turkey	Sevil Özgültekin	18	Istanbul
United Kingdom	Elizabeth Ann Jones	20	Welshpool
United States	Debra Jean Freeze	20	Mooresville
United States Virgin Islands	Enid Francis	18	Saint Croix
Uruguay	Mabel Rúa	21	Montevideo
Venezuela	Patricia Tóffoli	18	Coro
West Germany	Monika Greis	23	Heidelberg
Western Samoa	Rosalina Sapolu	23	Apia
