= Miss Venezuela 1977 =

24th edition of the Miss Venezuela competition

- Date: May 6, 1977
- Presenters: Gilberto Correa; Liana Cortijo
- Venue: Teatro Paris (La Campiña) Caracas, Venezuela
- Broadcaster: Venevision
- Entrants: 15
- Placements: 5
- Winner: Cristal Montañez; Departamento Vargas

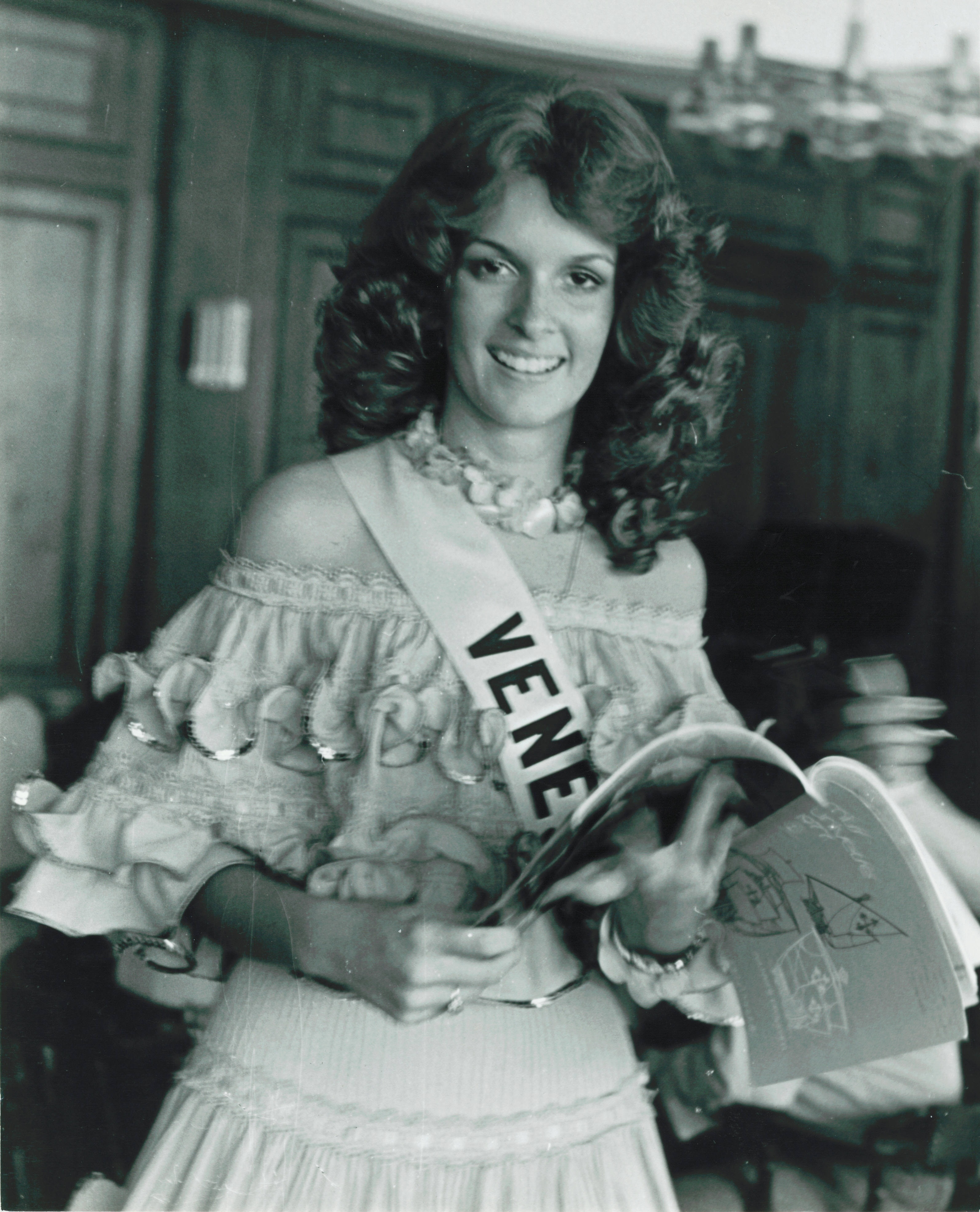
Cristal Montañez, Miss Venezuela 1977

Miss Venezuela 1977 was the 24th edition of Miss Venezuela pageant held at Teatro Paris (now called Teatro La Campiña) in Caracas, Venezuela, on May 6, 1977. The winner of the pageant was Cristal Montañez, Miss Departamento Vargas.

The pageant was broadcast live by Venevision.

== Results ==
=== Placements ===
- Miss Venezuela 1977 - Cristal Montañez (Miss Departamento Vargas)
- 1st runner-up - Vilma Góliz Romero (Miss Falcón) (disqualified)
- 1st runner-up - Jackeline Van Den Branden (Miss Distrito Federal)
- 2nd runner-up - Betty Paredes (Miss Lara)
- 3rd runner-up - Adriana Zekendorf (Miss Barinas)
- 4th runner-up - Isbelia Belloso (Miss Zulia) (entered runners-up after disqualification of Miss Falcón)

=== Special awards ===
- Miss Fotogénica (Miss Photogenic) - Vilma Góliz (Miss Falcón)
- Miss Elegancia (Miss Elegance) - Cristal Montañez (Miss Departamento Vargas)
- Miss Simpatía (Miss Congeniality) - Adriana Zekendorf (Miss Barinas)
- Miss Amistad (Miss Friendship) - Ana Celina Pabón (Miss Táchira)

== Contestants ==
- Miss Anzoátegui - Consuelo Emperatriz Vegas
- Miss Apure - Emilia González
- Miss Aragua - Enriqueta Coll
- Miss Barinas - Adriana Zekendorf Gómez
- Miss Carabobo - Rita D'Elia
- Miss Departamento Vargas - Cristal Montañez Arocha
- Miss Distrito Federal - Jackeline Van Den Branden Oquendo
- Miss Falcón - Vilma Yadira Góliz Romero
- Miss Guárico - Finita Arreaza
- Miss Lara - Betty Paredes
- Miss Mérida - Silvia Schanelly
- Miss Miranda - Betty González
- Miss Táchira - Ana Celina Pabón Ramírez
- Miss Trujillo - Luisa del Carmen -Reina- Morón Piña
- Miss Zulia - Isbelia Belloso Leyba
