= Lupita Jones =

Mexican actress, TV producer, and beauty pageant titleholder (born 1967)

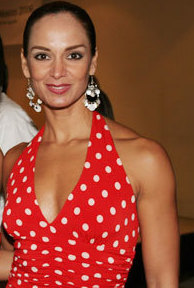
- Jones in 2008
- Born: María Guadalupe Jones Garay; 6 September 1967 (age 59); Mexicali, Baja California, Mexico
- Height: 1.73 m (5 ft 8 in)
- Spouse: Simón Charaf Medina (m. 1993; div. 2000)
- Children: 1
- Beauty pageant titleholder
- Hair color: Brown
- Eye color: Brown
- Major competitions: Señorita Baja California 1990 (Winner); Señorita México 1990 (Winner); Miss Universe 1991 (Winner)

María Guadalupe "Lupita" Jones Garay (Spanish pronunciation: [luˈpita ˈʝo(w)ns]; born 6 September 1967) is a Mexican producer, actress and beauty pageant titleholder. She was crowned Miss Universe 1991.

== Education ==
Before becoming Miss Universe 1991, Jones received a degree in business administration and did postgraduate studies in industrial administration at the Centro de Enseñanza Técnica y Superior in Mexicali, Baja California.

== Pageantry ==
=== Señorita Mexico ===
In September 1990, Jones won the title of Señorita México representing the state of Baja California.

=== Miss Universe ===
On 17 May 1991, Jones competed against 72 contestants for the title of Miss Universe 1991 at Las Vegas, Nevada representing Mexico. She advanced to the semifinals of the event as first place.

Jones was the only contestant with an average score above 9. During the final stage, Jones won every single round of competition: swimsuit, interview, and evening gown. She dominated the next two rounds of competition (the Top 6 judges' questions and the Top 3 final questions) and won the crown, the prizes, and the Miss Universe title for her country.

== Television producer ==
After ending her reign in 1992, she started the company Promocertamen in 1994 with Televisa to produce Nuestra Belleza México, Mexico's official pageant responsible for choosing Mexico's delegates for Miss Universe, Miss World and Miss International. This new pageant was created when Señorita México was moved to another TV network, TV Azteca.

In 1997, she attempted to launch the first male-only beauty contest, El Modelo México, but the show got little attention from the public.

In 2001, for the Nuestra Belleza México show, Lupita Jones launched the Report Her campaign, which invited the public to report beautiful women in their state. Critics attacked the campaign on discrimination charges. She produced a winner at one of the 3 most well-known beauty pageants on the planet since 1960: Priscila Perales, Miss International 2007 and another one in 2009 with Anagabriela Espinoza, Miss International 2009. In 2010, a Mexican woman was crowned as Miss Universe 2010, Ximena Navarrete. Accordingly, Jones promised she would vacate the direction of Nuestra Belleza México once a new Mexican Miss Universe would be entitled, but did not follow through after Navarrete won the title.

From 2008 to 2014, Lupita Jones and longtime pageant director-rival Osmel Sousa were brought together to judge Nuestra Belleza Latina, a beauty pageant-related reality television series created by the US Hispanic network Univision, which searches for young women of Latin American descent across the United States.

In 2015, in response to negative comments on Mexicans by Donald Trump, part-owner of the Miss Universe organization, as head of Nuestra Belleza México, Jones endorsed withdrawal of the 2015 contestant from Mexico and urged a boycott of products associated with the 2015 pageant.

== Humanitarian causes ==
In 1999, Lupita Jones decided that the contest would support an important program for ill-treated girls in the country through the Integral Family Development project.

In 2000, Jones accepted an appointment as UNFPA Goodwill Ambassador and Face to Face Campaign Spokesperson for Mexico.

== Political career ==
In 2021, Jones ran as a candidate of the Va por México electoral alliance for governor of Baja California, coming in third place with 13% behind Jorge Hank Rhon of the Encuentro Solidario Party, with 28%, and the winner Marina del Pilar Ávila Olmeda, of the Juntos Hacemos Historia coalition, who won 45% of the votes. Regarding the results, Jones said that she was typecast as a beauty queen and that she was not allowed to prove that she could work in another area.

== Filmography ==
=== Telenovelas ===
Year	Project	Role	Notes
2019	El señor de los cielos	Amaranta Reyes	
2017	Enamorándome de Ramón	Katy Fernández de Medina	Special participation
2015	Como dice el dicho	Rocío / Ana Regina	2 Episodes
2014	La malquerida (telenovela)	Carmen Gallardo de Torres	Recurring role
2013	Por siempre mi amor		
2013	Rosario	Fabiana Silva	

=== Reality TV ===
Year	Project	Role	Notes
2008-2014	Nuestra Belleza Latina	Jury member	
2012	Se vale	Dancer	
2008	Me quiero enamorar	Adviser	
	100 mexicanos dijeron		
	La Hora Pico	Guest Star	

=== Books ===
- Palabra de reina (in Spanish). Grupo Editorial Planeta. 1993. ISBN 978-9684063037.
- Bella y en forma, 15 anos despues (in Spanish). Planeta. 2006. ISBN 978-9703705634.
- Deten el tiempo (in Spanish). Urano. 2011. ISBN 978-8479537852.
- ABC para rejuvenecer (in Spanish). Urano. 2012. ISBN 978-6077835462.

Awards and achievements
Preceded by (Norway) Mona Grudt	Miss Universe; 1991	Succeeded by (Namibia) Michelle McLean
Preceded by Marilé del Rosario	Señorita México; 1990	Succeeded by Lilia Cristina Serrano (Assumed)
Preceded by Derly Escorihuela	Señorita Baja California; 1990	Succeeded by Karina Caicedo
