= Silvia de Esteban =

Spanish model and beauty queen

Silvia de Esteban Niubo (born December 1, 1971, in Santa Cruz de Tenerife) is a Spanish model and beauty queen. she is the second delegate from her country to win the Miss International title. She held the title in 1990, 13 years after Pilar Medina Canadell won in 1977.

Awards and achievements
| Preceded by (Germany) Iris Klein | Miss International; 1990 | Succeeded by (Poland) Agnieszka Kotlarska |
