= Janelle Commissiong =

Trinidadian beauty queen (born 1953)

Janelle Commissiong T.C.
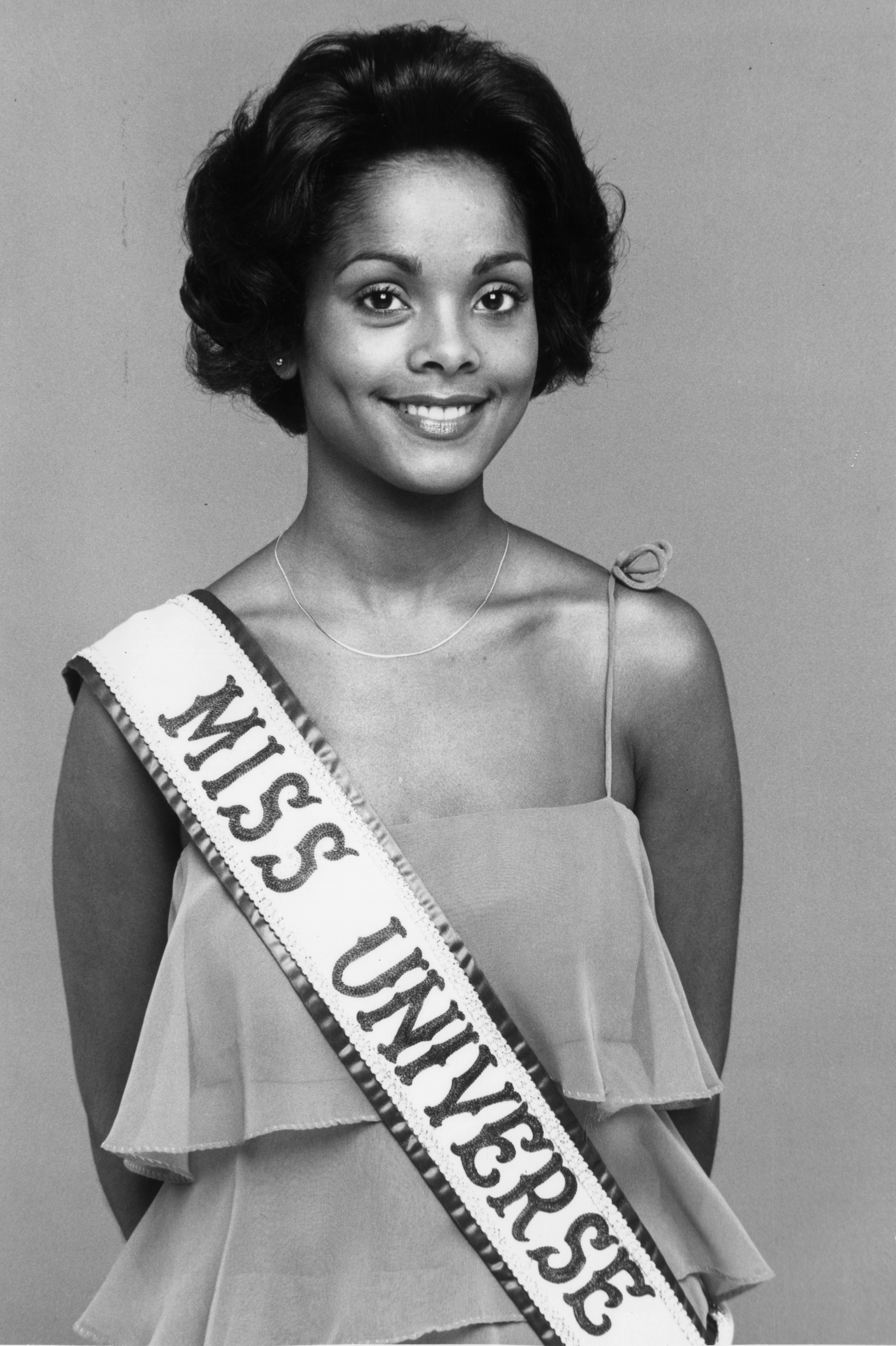
- Commissiong in 1978
- Born: 15 June 1953 (age 73); Port of Spain, Trinidad and Tobago
- Other names: Penny; Janelle Commissiong-Chow
- Education: Fashion Institute of Technology
- Height: 1.65 m (5 ft 5 in)
- Spouse: Brian Bowen (died 1989): Alwin Chow (died 2021)
- Beauty pageant titleholder
- Title: Miss Trinidad & Tobago 1977; Miss Universe 1977
- Hair color: Brown
- Eye color: Brown
- Major competitions: Miss Trinidad & Tobago 1977 (Winner); Miss Universe 1977 (Winner); Miss Photogenic 1977 (Winner)

Janelle Penny Commissiong, T.C. (born, 15 June 1953) is a Trinidadian beauty queen who was crowned Miss Universe 1977.

== Early life and education ==
Janelle Commissiong was born on 15 June 1953 in Port of Spain, to Lucy Maria Joseph and Ruel Commissiong. Commissiong's mother was Venezuelan and her father was Trinidadian. Commissiong has one older sister, Gail.

In 1958, Commissiong's parents moved to Venezuela and later migrated to New York City. During this time Commissiong and her sister remained in Trinidad and lived with their aunts. Commissiong studied at Bishop Anstey High School. In 1966, Commissiong to migrated New York City, and was educated at Erasmus Hall High School.

Commissiong studied fashion at the Fashion Institute of Technology. In 1976, Commissiong returned to Trinidad.

== Career ==
Commissiong was selected to represent the country at the 1977 Miss Universe competition in Santo Domingo, Dominican Republic.

She was elected Miss Photogenic four days before the final, becoming the first black woman to win these awards in Miss Universe history. On July 16, in the National Theater of Santo Domingo, Commissiong was crowned Miss Universe, attracting international attention as the first black winner in the chronology of Miss Universe.

During her reign, she was an advocate for black rights and world peace. Commissiong was awarded the Trinity Cross, the country's highest award, in 1977. After winning the Miss Trinidad and Tobago Universe title, she went on to be crowned Miss Universe 1977 in Santo Domingo, Dominican Republic and in the process became the first black woman to win the prestigious pageant crown. After winning the title, she was most commonly known as 'Penny' because she was small as a penny. That is her actual middle name.

Commissiong was named chair of the newly formed Tourism Trinidad Destination Management Company in October 2017. From 2012 to 2015 she had served as vice-chair of its predecessor agency, the Tourism Development Company.

== In popular culture ==
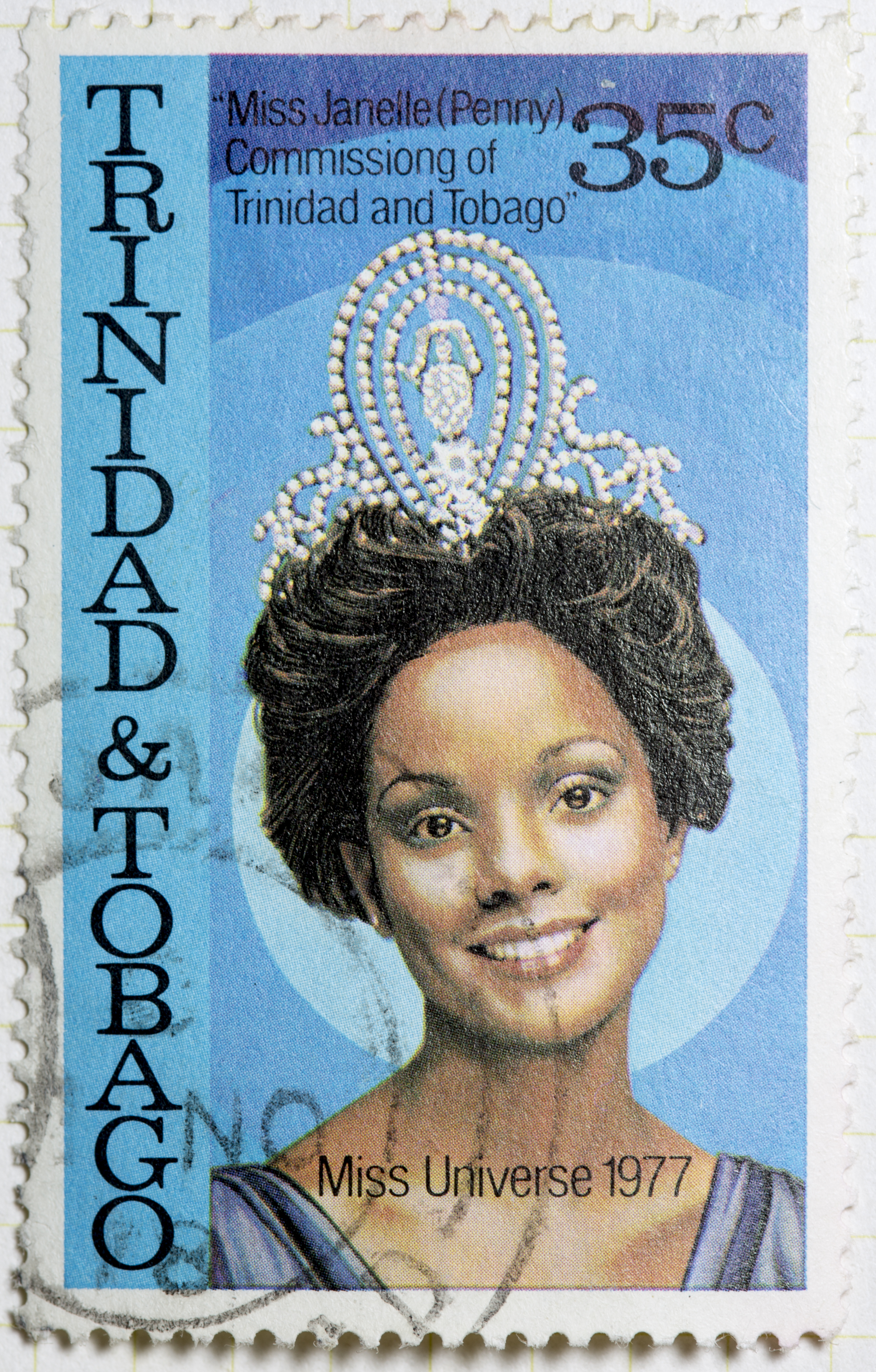
A Trinidad & Tobago postage stamp depicting Commissiong

In honour of Commissiong's Miss Universe 1977 winner, Three postage stamps were commissioned of Commissiong by the Trinidad and Tobago Postal Service.

In 2017, Queen Street in Port of Spain was renamed to Queen Janelle Commissiong Street in tribute of Commissiong's 1977 Miss Universe win.

== Personal life ==
She married Brian Bowen, founder of Bowen Marine, who died in an accident in November 1989. After his death, she married businessman Alwin Chow.

== See also ==
- Giselle LaRonde
- Wendy Fitzwilliam

Awards and achievements
Preceded by (Israel) Rina Messinger	Miss Universe; 1977	Succeeded by (South Africa) Margaret Gardiner
