= Felicia Mercado =

Mexican actress, singer and TV hostess (born 1959)

- Born: Felicia Mercado Agud; December 17, 1959 (age 66); Tijuana, Baja California, Mexico
- Occupations: Actress, singer, tv host
- Years active: 1980–present
- Title: Señorita México 1977
- Spouse: Eugene Santoscoy (1997–present)
- Children: Ivana Francesca (b. 1998)
- Parent(s): José Luis Mercado; Ofelia Agud

Felicia Mercado Agud (born December 17, 1959) is a Mexican actress, singer, TV host and beauty pageant titleholder, best known for her appearances in telenovelas.

== Biography ==
Mercado's entry into the entertainment world began with beauty contests. At just 17 years old, she won the Señorita México in 1977 and went on to represent Mexico in the Miss Universe pageant that same year. This early success paved her way into the world of film and television.

Starting her professional career around 1980, Mercado's work spans various mediums. Her acting career is her most prominent facet. She became one of the audience's favorite "villains" during the 1980s and 1990s. Key roles include her breakout performance as Leonela in Rosa Salvaje (replacing Edith González), and parts in Teresa, Lazos de Amor, Between Love and Hatred, La Casa de al Lado, and, more recently, Cabo (2022-2023).

In 1997, Mercado married Eugenio Santoscoy. The couple has one daughter named Ivana Francesca Santoscoy, born in 1998.

== Filmography ==
=== Telenovelas ===
Year	Title	role	Notes
1981	El hogar que yo robé	Odalisca	Supporting role
1984-1985	Si, mi amor	Lady Simpson	
1985-1986	Vivir un poco	Magdalena Dávalos	
1986-1987	El precio de la fama	Doris	Supporting role
1987-1988	Rosa Salvaje	Leonela Villareal #2	
1989	Lo blanco y lo negro	Déborah	
1993	Entre la vida y la muerte	Cristina	Guest star
1993-1994	Mas allá del puente	Sara	
1995	Lazos de Amor	Nancy Balboa	Guest star
1996	Cañaveral de Pasiones	Margarita Faberman de Santos	Guest star
1996	Confidente de secundaria	Casandra	Supporting role
1996-1997	Te sigo amando	Dr. Carmen	Guest star
1998	Preciosa	Enriqueta de San Román	
2000	Por Un Beso	Eugenia Mendizábal de Ballesteros	Supporting role
2001	Amigas y rivales	Sonia Villalobos Vda de Torreblanca/de De la O	Guest star
2002	Entre el Amor y el Odio	Lucila Montes	
2009	Sortilegio	Adriana Villavicencio de Lombardo	Guest star
2010-2011	Teresa	Genoveva Alba De Icaza	Supporting role
2011	La Casa de al Lado	Eva Spencer de Conde	Main cast
2012-2013	El rostro de la venganza	Valeria de Samaniego	Supporting role
2013	Dama y obrero	Estela Mendoza de Santamaría	Main cast
2022-2023	Cabo	Jimena Manrique	Supporting role
2025	Velvet: El nuevo imperio	Teresa	Guest star

=== Films ===
- Tres de presidio (1980)
- El sátiro (1981)
- Ok Mister Pancho (1981)
- Viva el chubasco (1983)
- El rey de oros (1984) ... María
- Narco terror (1985)
- La chica de la piscina (1987) ... Marcela
- Se vende esposa en buenísimo estado (1988)
- Con el odio en la piel (1988)
- Cacería implacable (1988)
- Cacería de recompensas (1989) ... María Niebla
- La ley de las calles (1989)
- Un macho en reformatorio de señoritas (1989)
- Guerra de bikinis (1990)
- Investigador privado... muy privado (1990)
- Zapatero a tus zapatos (1990)
- La soplona (1990)
- Pleito de perdedores (1990)
- Noche de pánico (1990)
- Las dos caras de la muerte (1990)
- La pisca de la muerte (1990)
- Traficantes del vicio (1990)
- La caida de Noriega (1990)
- Prisión sin ley (1990)
- Los cuates del pirruris (1991) ... Silvana
- El ninja mexicano (1991)
- The Last Riders (1991) .... Mitsy
- Las caguamas ninjas (1991) .... Martita
- Esa mujer me vuelve loco (1991) .... Sandra
- La huella (1991) .... Marlene Torre
- Maten al inocente (1991) .... Elena Gazcón
- Muerte por partida doble (1991) .... Amelia
- Secreto sangriento (1991) .... Ángelica
- El lambiscon verde (1991)
- Trampa mortal (1992) .... Sandra Lee
- Sueños sangrientos (1992)
- Chicas en peligro (1993)
- Dónde quedó la bolita (1993)
- La voz de los caracoles (1993)
- Infancia violenta (1993)
- Muerte en altamar (1994)
- Escuadrón de honor (1995)
- Instinto asesino II (1995)
- Las calenturas de Juan Camaney III (1996)
- Metiche y encajoso IV (1997)
- AR-15 Comando Implacable II (1997) .... Sagrario
- Cristal: Ambición mortal (1997)
- Pesadilla infernal (1997)
- Del norte a la gran ciudad (1998)

Awards and achievements
Preceded by Carla Reguera	Señorita México; 1977	Succeeded by Alba Margarita Cervera
