= Señorita México =

Beauty pageant in Mexico,1952–2003

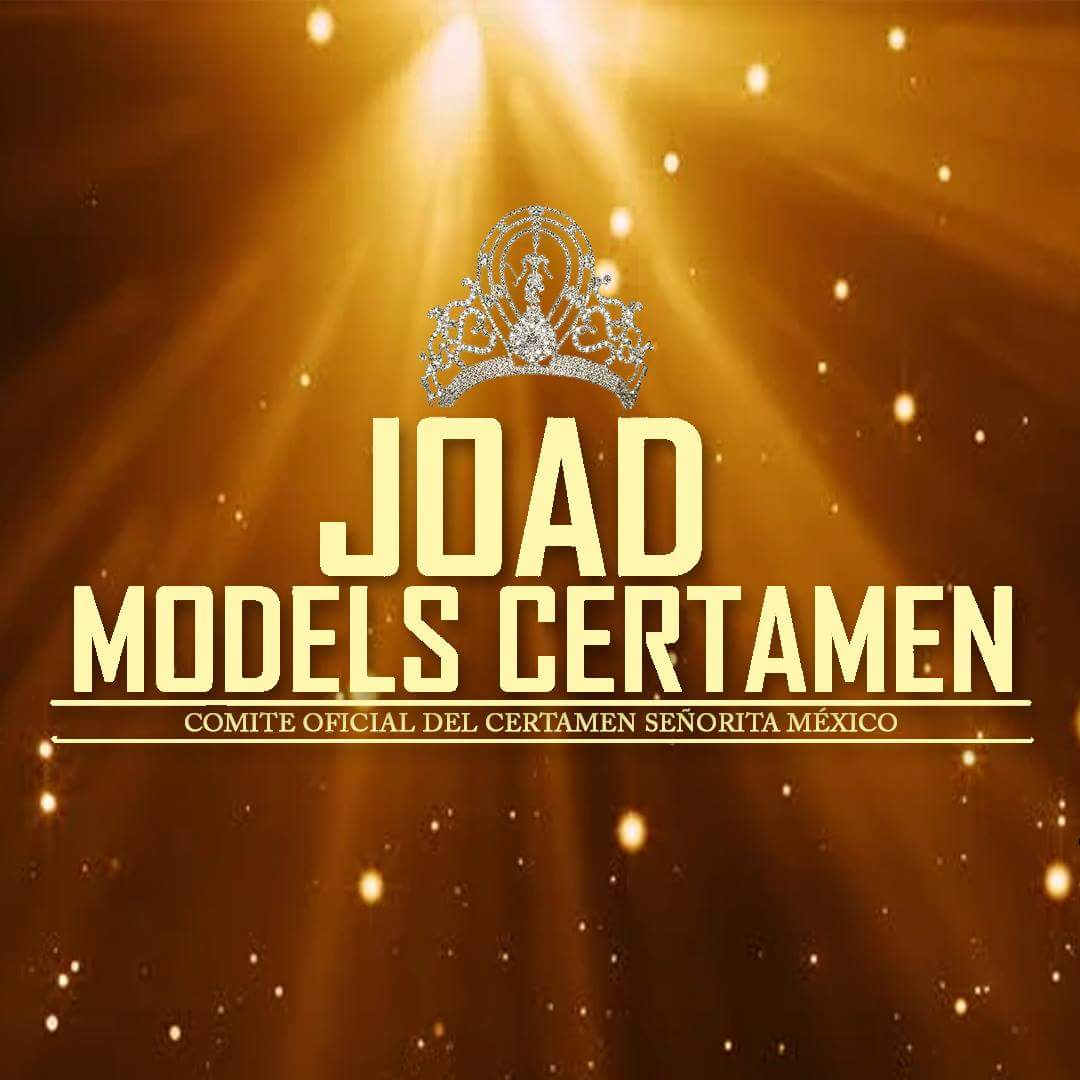
- Official logo
- Formation: 1952—2003
- Purpose: Beauty pageant
- Headquarters: Mexico City
- Location: Mexico
- Official language: Spanish
- Leader: Carlos Guerrero Ruiz Cabañas
- Affiliations: Miss Universe; Miss World; Miss International; Miss Asia Pacific International

Señorita México was the name of a national beauty pageant in Mexico. From 1952 to 2003, it was the official pageant responsible for sending Mexico's representatives to Miss Universe, Miss World, Miss International and other international pageants.

== History ==
Lupita Jones was Mexico's first Miss Universe, a dispute between Jones and the pageant organizers, led to a break between the pageant and the broadcast network Televisa. When the pageant moved to TV Azteca network, a competing pageant called "Nuestra Belleza México" was created, later directed by Miss Jones with the sponsorship of Televisa TV Network.

In 1994, Señorita México fail to gain the rights to Nuestra Belleza México, to be the official pageant for Miss Universe. Later Nuestra Belleza México obtained the rights to send Mexico's contestants to Miss World and Miss International.

== Representatives at major international pageants ==
This list of annual titleholders of Señorita México, is listed in ascending order, the states they represented during their national crowning or assignment and their final placements in Miss Universe after their participation.

Color key

- : Declared as the winner
- : Finished as a runner-up or top 5/6 qualification
- : Finished as one of the finalists or semi-finalists
- : Unplaced but received a special award(s)

=== Miss Universe ===
Year	Señorita México	State	Competition performance	
Year	Señorita México	State	Placements	Special award(s)
1952	Olga Llorens Pérez Castillo	Chihuahua	Top 10	
1953	Ana Bertha Lepe Jiménez †	Jalisco	3rd Runner-up	
1954	María Elvira Castillo y Olvera †	Distrito Federal		
1955	Yolanda Mayen	Distrito Federal		
1956	Erna Martha Bauman †	Distrito Federal	Top 15	
1957	Irma Arévalo Toust	Distrito Federal		
1958	Elvira Leticia Risser Corredor	Tamaulipas		
1959	Mirna Eugenia García Dávila	Distrito Federal		
Did not compete between 1960—1966
1967	Valentina Vales Duarte	Yucatán		
1968	Perla Olivia Aguirre Muñoz	Distrito Federal		
1969	Gloria Leticia Hernández Martín †	Guanajuato		
1970	Libia Zulema López Montemayor †	Sinaloa		
1971	María Luisa López	Distrito Federal		Best National Costume
1972	María del Carmen Orozco Quibrera	Chihuahua		
1973	Gladys Rossana Villares Moreno	Yucatán		
1974	Guadalupe Elorriaga Valdéz	Sinaloa		
1975	Delia Servín Nieto	Sinaloa		Best National Costume
1976	Carla Jean Evert Reguera †	Guerrero		
1977	Felicia Mercado Agud	Baja California		
1978	Alba Margarita Cervera Lavat	Yucatán	Top 12	
1979	Blanca María Luisa Díaz Tejeda	Nayarit		
1980	Ana Patricia Núñez Romero	Sonora		
1981	Judith Grace González Hicks	Nuevo León		
1982	María del Carmen López Flores	Distrito Federal		
1983	Mónica María Rosas Torres	Durango		
1984	Elizabeth Broden Ibáñez	Sinaloa		
1985	Yolanda De la Cruz Cárdenas	Sinaloa		
1986	Alejandrina Carranza Ancheta	Sonora		
1987	Cynthia Fallon García Cepeda	Distrito Federal		
1988	Amanda Olivares Phillips	Puebla	2nd Runner-up	
1989	Adriana Abascal López Cisneros	Veracruz	4th Runner-up	
1990	Marilé del Rosario Santiago	Tlaxcala	3rd Runner-up	
1991	María Guadalupe Jones Garay	Baja California	Miss Universe 1991	
1992	Mónica Zúñiga Arriaga	Hidalgo		
1993	Angelina González Guerrero	Campeche		
1994	Fabiola Pérez Rovirosa	Chihuahua		

=== Miss World ===
Year	Delegate	State	Competition performance	
Year	Delegate	State	Placements	Special award(s)
1963	Ana Beatriz Martínez Solórzano	Distrito Federal		Best in Swimsuit
1965	Ana Elena Noreña Grass	Distrito Federal		
1966	María Cecilia González DuPree	Los Angeles		
1967	María Cristina Ortal	Los Angeles		
1968	Ana María Magaña	Los Angeles		
1969	Gloria Leticia Hernández Martín	Guanajuato		Miss Photogenic
1970	Libia Zulema López Montemayor †	Sinaloa		
1971	Zita Lucía Arellano Zajur	Zacatecas		
1972	Gloria Guadalupe Gutiérrez López	Distrito Federal	Top 15	
1973	Gladys Rossana Villares Moreno	Yucatán		
1974	Guadalupe Elorriaga Valdés	Sinaloa		
1975	Blanca Patricia López Esparza	Jalisco		
1976	Carla Jean Evert Reguera	Guerrero		
1977	Elizabeth Aguilar González	Estado de México	Top 15	
1978	Martha Eugenia Ortíz Gámez	Distrito Federal	3rd Runner-Up	Miss Photogenic
1979	Roselina Rosas Torres	Durango	Top 15	
1980	Claudia Mercedes Holley Braum	Tamaulipas		
1981	Dora Elizabeth Pontvianne Espinosa †	Tamaulipas	Top 15	Miss Personality
1982	Ana Ruth García Jiménez	Tabasco		
1983	Mayra Adela Rojas González	Oaxaca	Top 15	
1984	Mariana Sofía Urrea Stettner	Jalisco		
1985	Alicia Yolanda Carrillo González	Jalisco		
1986	María De la Luz Velasco Félix	Baja California		
1987	Elizabeth Carrillo Iturrios	Sinaloa		
1988	Cecilia Cervera Ferrer	Tlaxcala		
1989	Nelia María Ochoa Arteaga	Veracruz		
1990	Luz María Mena Basso	Yucatán		
1991	María Cristina Urrutia De la Vega	Aguascalientes		
1992	Carla Lucía Lehman Fernández	Yucatán		
1993	Elizabeth Margain Rivera	Sonora		
1994	Claudia Hernández Rodríguez	Nayarit		

=== Miss International ===
Year	Delegate	State	Competition performance	
Year	Delegate	State	Placements	Special award(s)
1972	Margarita Julia Martínez	San Luis Potosí		
1973	Amalia Fernández Lasso	Coahuila		
1974	Alicia Elena Cardona Ruíz	Guanajuato		Miss Friendship
1975	Margarita Vernitz Guajardo	Distrito Federal		Best National Costume
1976	Alejandra Mora Urbina	Distrito Federal		
1977	Ernestina Sodi Miranda	Distrito Federal		
1978	Olga Pescador Sosa	Estado de México		Best National Costume
1979	Marcela Díaz Portilla	Distrito Federal		
1980	Narda Sabag Cianca	Estado de México		
1981	María Fabiola Torres Sariat	Yucatán		
1982	Norma Patricia Méndez Tornell	Estado de México	4th Runner-Up	
1983	Rosalba Chávez Carretero	Puebla		
1984	Adriana Margarita González García	Hidalgo	Top 15	Best National Costume
1985	Rebecca De Alba Díaz	Zacatecas		
1986	Martha Cristiana	Puebla	2nd Runner-Up	
1987	Rosa Isela Fuentes	Tlaxcala	2nd Runner-Up	
1988	María Alejandra Merino Ferrer	Tabasco	Top 15	Miss Elegance
1989	Erika Salum Escalante	Quintana Roo	Top 15	
1990	Elizabeth Cavazos Leal	Tamaulipas		
1991	Lilia Cristina Serrano Nájera	Chiapas	Top 15	Best National Costume
1992	María De los Ángeles López	Veracruz		
1993	María Cristina Arcos Torres	Jalisco	Top 15	
1994	Lilia Elizabeth Huesca Guajardo	Tamaulipas		
1995	Marlene de la Garza	Tamaulipas		
1996	Sandra Sosa Nasta	Puebla		
1997	Marisol Alonso González	Chihuahua		
1998	Karina Patricia Mora Novelo	Campeche		

== Delegates at other pageants ==
Color key

- : Declared as the winner
- : Finished as a runner-up or top 5/6 qualification
- : Finished as one of the finalists or semi-finalists
- : Unplaced but received a special award(s)

=== Miss Asia Pacific International ===
Year	Delegate	State	Competition performance	
Year	Delegate	State	Placements	Special award(s)
1984	María Fernanda Quintana Martínez	Estado de México		
1985	Lina Santos Otamendi	Coahuila	Top 12	
1986	Zoila Cárdenas Camarena	Jalisco		
1987	Ana Corina Burgos del Río	Baja California	1st Runner-Up	Best National Costume
1988	Elsy Guadalupe Aceves Gurrola	Jalisco	1st Runner-Up	Best in Long Gown
1989	Gladys América López Ibarra	Sinaloa	Top 12	
1992	Sofía Barrero	Estado de México	Top 12	Best National Costume
1993	María Teresa López Tarín	Guanajuato	3rd Runner-Up	
1994	Karla Contreras Estrada	Michoacán	1st Runner-Up	Best in Long Gown
1995	Brenda Montserrat Miranda Hijar	Distrito Federal		
1998	Gloria Adriana Suárez Orantes	Chiapas		
1999	Nora Hilda Gonzalez Camacho	Tamaulipas	Top 10	
2000	Michelle Chen Araujo	Guerrero		
2001	Lizzet Villanueva Jimenez	Tabasco	1st Runner-Up	Best in Swimsuit; Best National Costume
2002	Luz García	Distrito Federal		
2003	Ana Yuceli Ocón Batista	Sinaloa		

=== Miss Maja International ===
Year	Delegate	State	Competition performance	
Year	Delegate	State	Placements	Special award(s)
1973	Mirtha Dalia Liquidano Rodríguez	Distrito Federal		
1974	Maria Cristina González Tella	Guanajuato		Miss Congeniality
1976	Gloria Quijada	Distrito Federal		Best National Costume
1977	Úrsula Prats	Morelos	1st Runner-up	Miss Popularity
1978	María Martha Collignon Goribar	Jalisco		
1979	Ana Rosa Sánchez Mejía	Jalisco	3rd Runner-up	
1980	Laura Elena Chávez Padilla	Jalisco		
1981	Gabriela Carrera Andrade	Jalisco		Miss Congeniality
1982	Ana María Elena Barba Cervantes	Jalisco		
1983	Roxana Charpenel Figueroa	Jalisco		
1984	Mariana Sofia Urrea Stettner	Jalisco		
1985	Alicia Yolanda Carrillo González	Jalisco		
1986	María Lorel de Mola Gomory	Yucatán	3rd Runner-up	
1987	Rosa Isela Fuentes Chávez	Tlaxcala	Top 10	
1988	Cecilia María Meneses Nájera	Chiapas		
1989	Patricia Mastache Rodríguez	Morelos	Top 10	
Did not compete between 1990—1994
1995	Claudia Hernández Rodríguez	Nayarit	Miss Maja International 1995	Best National Costume

=== Miss Intercontinental ===
Year	Delegate	State	Competition performance	
Year	Delegate	State	Placements	Special award(s)
1976	Patricia Rivera Martínez	Coahuila	Top 19	
1977	Guadalupe Martínez González	Nuevo León	Top 19	
1978	María Montesinos Alcázar	Oaxaca		
1979	Marcela Díaz Portilla	Distrito Federal		
1980	Claudia Mercedes Holley	Tamaulipas	Top 12	
1981	Lourdes Escalante del Águila	Sonora		
1982	Landy Ivone Bretón Loeza	Hidalgo		
1983	Luz María Arias Ochoa	Distrito Federal	Top 12	
Did not compete between 1984—1989
1990	Brenda Yamilé Jiménez Loya	Nuevo León	2nd Runner-up	Miss Photogenic

=== Miss Hispanidad Internacional ===
Year	Delegate	State	Competition performance	
Year	Delegate	State	Placements	Special award(s)
1988	Adriana Pardo Torres	Michoacán		
1989	Luz del Carmen Favela Meraz	Campeche		
1991	Carolina Bringas Hernández	Veracruz	1st Runner-up	
1992	Mónica Patricia Monreal Vidales	Sonora	Miss Hispanidad Internacional 1992	
1993	María Reyna Fierro Flores	Chihuahua		
1994	Silvia Alicia Solís Trasancos	Veracruz	4th Runner-up	
1995	Fabiola Pérez Rovirosa	Chihuahua	Miss Hispanidad Internacional 1995	

=== Reina Mundial del Banano ===
Year	Delegate	State	Competition performance	
Year	Delegate	State	Placements	Special award(s)
1987	Laura Fojaco Cortéz	Tabasco		
1988	Claudia Anel López Romero	Baja California Sur		
1989	Luz Favela Contreras	Campeche		
1990	Luz Angélica Ruíz Velasco Padilla	Aguascalientes	Reina Mundial del Banano 1990	
1991	Frida Rudolff Vargas	Distrito Federal		
1992	Mónica Aída González Mejía	Jalisco	3rd Runner-up	
1993	Yadira Yesenia Ríos García	Tamaulipas	Reina Mundial del Banano 1993	Miss Photogenic
1994	Blanca Talía Gómez Basurto	Estado de México		
1995	Claudia Soto Reza	Distrito Federal		
1996	Luisa Díaz Maldonado	Puebla		

=== Queen of the Year International ===
Year	Delegate	State	Competition performance	
Year	Delegate	State	Placements	Special award(s)
1993	María de los Angeles González	Tabasco		
1994	Susana Galvez Escobedo	Nuevo León	3rd Runner-Up	
1995	Phegda Guadalupe Becerra	Chiapas		
1997	Kastany de la Vega Vásquez	Veracruz	Queen of the Year International 1997	Best National Costume

== See also ==
- Mexicana Universal
- Miss Mexico Organization
- Mr World Mexico
- Mister México
- Miss Earth México
