= Miss Bermuda =

Beauty pageant

The Miss Bermuda Foundation
- Formation: 1965
- Type: Beauty pageant
- Headquarters: Hamilton
- Location: Bermuda
- Official language: English
- Chairwoman: Milika Trott-Seymour
- Website: Official website

The Miss Bermuda is a national beauty pageant in Bermuda. The pageant was established in 1965 and is the official national pageant to select representatives at international pageants.

== Miss Universe Bermuda ==
Miss Bermuda was identified to have been held for the first time in 1965. The winner then went on to compete at Miss Universe pageant until 1997. Since then, Bermuda did not compete at any beauty contests. The Miss Bermuda Pageant has an illustrious history, first competing in the Miss Universe Pageant in 1965, with Margaret Hill winning Miss Photogenic in 1970. Gina Swainson was the only Miss Bermuda who placed as the 1st Runner-up at Miss Universe 1979.

== Miss World Bermuda ==
Miss Bermuda began competing in the Miss World Pageant in 1971 and in 1979 Gina Swainson was the first Miss Bermuda to become Miss World.

== Titleholders ==
Year	Miss Bermuda
1965	Elaine Simons†
1966	Marie Trott
1967	Cheryl Michele Smith
1968	Victoria Martin
1969	Maxine Bean
1970	Margaret Hill
1971	Rana Furbert
1973	Judy Joy
1972	Helen Brown
1974	Joyce Ann De Rosa
1975	Donna Wright
1976	Vivienne Anne Hollis
1977	Connie Marie Frith
1978	Madeline Joell
1979	Gina Swainson
1980	Jill Murphy
1981	Cymone Florie
1982	Heather Ross
1983	Angelita Emily Diaz
1984	Rhonda Wilkinson
1985	Jannell Ford
1986	Samantha Jayne Morton
1987	Shelley Bascombe
1988	Kim Lightbourne
1989	Cornelia Furbert
1990	Janet Tucker
1991	Andrea Sullivan
1992	Colita Joseph
1993	Kellie Hall
1995	Renita Minors
1997	Naomi Darrell
1998	Joanne Darrell
2011	Jana Lynn Outerbridge
2012	Rochelle Minors
2013	Katherine Arnfield
2014	Lillian Lightbourn
2015	Alyssa Rose

== Notes ==
- 1979: Gina Swainson who was crowned as Miss Bermuda 1979 is the most successful Bermudan Beauty queen at International pageantry. She was crowned as the 1st Runner-up at Miss Universe 1979 in Australia when Maritza Sayalero of Venezuela won the title. After competing at the pageant, Gina continued to join Miss World 1979 in the Great Britain and won the title. In that year, Bermuda made a history for being successful country in two most prestigious pageant in the world.
- Elaine Simons, the first holder of the Miss Bermuda title, died on December 25, 2014, in Cincinnati, Ohio. She was 67.

== See also ==
- Miss World Bermuda
