= Miss Grand Denmark =

Danish beauty pageant title

- Formation: 2013
- Type: Beauty pageant
- Headquarters: Copenhagen
- Location: Denmark
- Members: Miss Grand International
- Official language: Danish
- National director: Lisa Lents
- Parent organization: Miss Queen of Scandinavia (2013, 2015 – 2017); Miss Denmark (2018, 2022 – present)

Miss Grand Denmark is a national beauty pageant title awarded to Danish representatives competing at the Miss Grand International pageant. The title was first awarded in 2013, when the director of Miss Queen of Scandinavia (MQOS), Peter Hadward, assigned the finalist of Danmarks Næste Topmodel Season 2, Natasja Smith, to represent Denmark at the inaugural edition of the mentioned international contest in Thailand; however, Smith withdrew before reaching the final round of the contest, health issues were claimed.

The license of Miss Grand Denmark belonged to the MQOS from 2013 to 2017, then was transferred to another national pageant, Miss Denmark, in which Lisa Lents served as the director.

== History ==
Denmark debuted in the Miss Grand International pageant in 2013, represented by an appointed candidate, Natasja Smith; however, she withdrew before entering the final stage of the pageant due to health problems. The following Danish representatives from 2015 to 2017 were determined through a national pageant chaired by Peter Hadward, named Miss Queen of Scandinavia Denmark (MQOS Denmark), where the Miss Grand Denmark title was considered the supplementary award. Nevertheless, all such representatives were unplaced on the international stage.

In 2018, the MQOS Denmark lost the Miss Grand franchise to another national pageant chaired by Lisa Lents, Miss Denmark. Under the direction of Lisa Lents, Danish representatives for Miss Grand International were appointed, not directly determined through the pageant she managed.

The highest and only placement obtained by Danish representatives is the top 20 finalists, achieved by Victoria Kjær Theilvig in 2022 who later went on to win Miss Universe 2024.

Winners' gallery

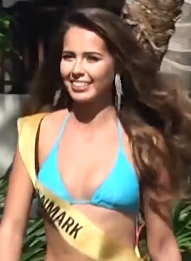
Isabella Christensen (2015)

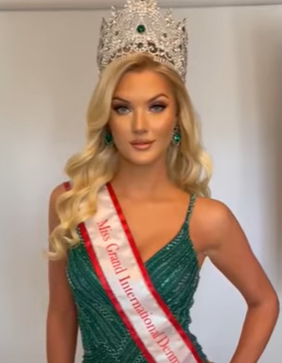
Victoria Kjær Theilvig (2022)

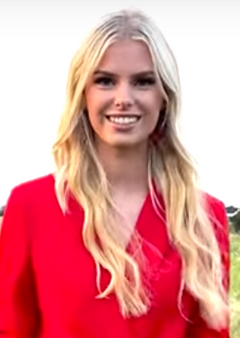
Sille Albertsen (2023)

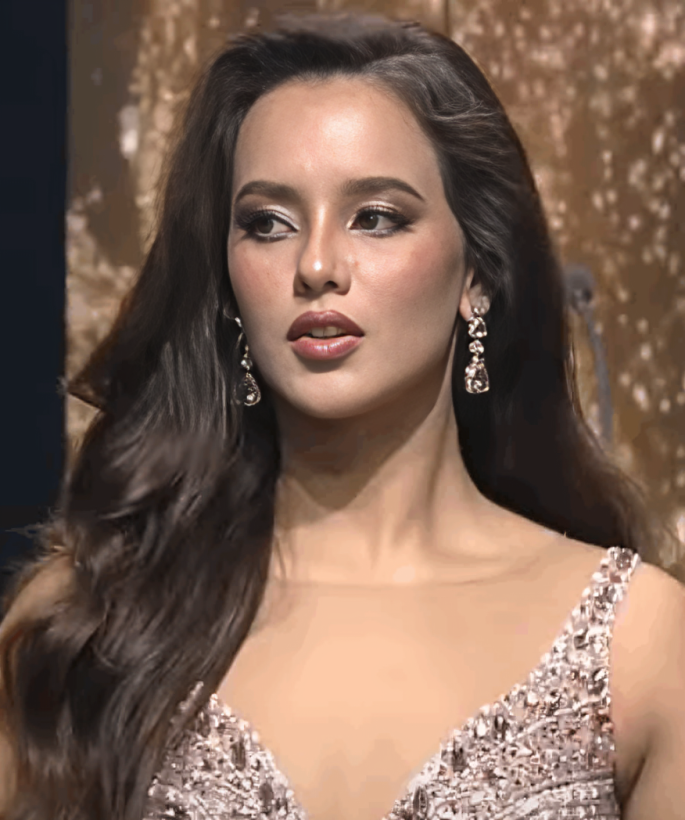
Cecilia Presmann (2024)

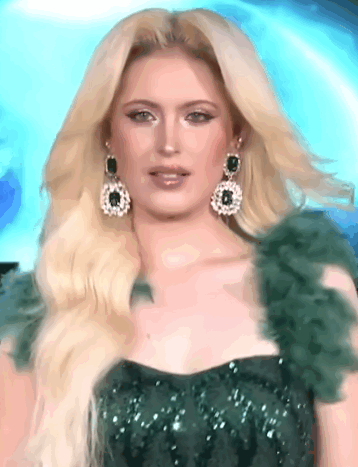
Emilie Andersen (2025)

== International competition ==
The following is a list of Danish representatives at the Miss Grand International contest.

Color keys

- : Declared as the winner
- : Ended as a runner-up (Top 5)
- : Ended as a finalist (Top 10)
- : Ended as a semifinalist (Top 20/21)
- : Ended as special awards winner

Year	Miss Grand Denmark	Title	Placement	Special Awards	National Director
Did not compete in 2026
2025	Emilie Lærkegaard-Andersen	Finalist Miss Denmark 2022	Unplaced		Lisa Lents
2025	Brynja Mary Sverrisdóttir	Miss Grand Iceland	Unplaced		Lisa Lents
2024	Cecilia Presmann	Finalist Miss Denmark 2024	Unplaced		Lisa Lents
2023	Sille Albertsen	4th runner-up Miss Denmark 2023	Unplaced		Lisa Lents
2022	Victoria Kjær Theilvig	2nd runner-up Miss Denmark 2021	Top 20		Lisa Lents
Did not compete between 2019 - 2021
2018	Natasja Kunde	3rd runner-up Miss Denmark 2018	Unplaced		Lisa Lents
2017	Natasha Bendix Helms	Miss Grand Denmark 2017	Withdrew due to health problems		Peter Hadwasd
2017	Iben Haahr Berner	Miss Globe Denmark 2017	Unplaced		Peter Hadwasd
2016	Ida Gøral Sjøstrøm	Miss Grand Denmark 2016	Unplaced		Peter Hadwasd
2015	Isabella Christensen	Miss Grand Denmark 2015	Unplaced		Peter Hadwasd
Did not compete in 2014
2013	Natasja Smith	Top 5 Danmarks Næste Topmodel Season 2	Withdrew during the competition		Peter Hadwasd
