= Face of Denmark =

- Formation: 2015
- Type: Beauty pageant
- Headquarters: Copenhagen
- Location: Denmark
- Members: Miss Universe; Miss International; Miss Earth
- Official language: Danish
- President: Anders de Voss & John Paul Hamilton
- Website: www.faceofdenmark.dk

Face of Denmark was a national beauty pageant in Denmark that selected the representative to the Miss Universe, Miss International, and Miss Earth.

== Organization ==
In 2015 the Face of Denmark organization formed, and began their national competitions, run by Anders Hamilton de Voss and his partner John Paul Hamilton de Voss.

Several former titleholders who achieved success representing Denmark at international beauty pageants are on the board of directors of the Face of Denmark organization, including: Catharina Svensson, the first Miss Earth winner from Denmark; Aino Korva, Miss Denmark 1963 and first runner-up at Miss Universe 1963; Pia Larsen, Miss Denmark 1986, and first runner-up at Miss International 1986 and Miss World 1986; Zaklina Sojic, Miss Universe Denmark 2007 and top 15 at Miss Universe 2007; and Mette Riis Sørensen, Miss International Denmark 2015.

== Big Four pageants ==
The following women have represented Denmark in three of the Big Four international beauty pageants, the four major international beauty pageant under the ownership of Face of Denmark organization. These are Miss Universe, Miss International and Miss Earth with the exception of Miss World which belongs to another national franchise organization, Miss Denmark.

=== Miss Universe Denmark ===
Color key

- Declared as the Winner
- Ended as a Runner-Up
- Ended as one of the Finalists or Semifinalists

List of Miss Universe Denmark representatives

The Face of Denmark winner was automatically declared as Miss Universe Denmark and represented Denmark at the Miss Universe pageant.

Year	Represented	Face of Denmark	Placement	Special Awards
2016	Copenhagen	Christina Mikkelsen	Unplaced	later dethroned
2015	Rungsted Kyst	Cecilie Wellemberg	Unplaced	

=== Miss International Denmark ===
Color key

- Declared as the Winner
- Ended as a Runner-Up
- Ended as one of the Finalists or Semifinalists

The Third title of Face of Denmark automatically declares as Miss International Denmark and represents Denmark at the Miss International pageant.

Year	Represented	Face of Denmark	Placement	Special Awards
2016	Odense	Sara Skals Danielsen	Unplaced	
2015	Østerbro	Mette Riis Sørensen	Unplaced	

=== Miss Earth Denmark ===
Color key

- Declared as the Winner
- Ended as a Runner-Up
- Ended as one of the Finalists or Semifinalists

The second title of Face of Denmark was automatically declared as Miss Earth Denmark and represented Denmark at the Miss Earth pageant. In 2017, the Miss Earth franchise was awarded to Lisa Lents, national director of Miss Denmark.

Year	Represented	Face of Denmark	Placement	Special Awards
2016	Vejle	Klaudia Persberg	Unplaced	Best in Resorts Wear by Jhong Sudlon
2015	Faroe Islands	Turið Elinborgardóttir	Unplaced	(bronze); Snowman Building

- ^{a} Turið Elinborgardóttir resigned after representing Denmark at Miss Earth 2015, due to pregnancy. The runner-up, Laila Karim first runner-up, of Nørrebro took the title as Miss Earth Denmark 2015.
- ^{[b]} Klaudia was a top 6 finalist and "First Princess" at Face of Denmark 2015. She was appointed to be Miss Earth Denmark by the Face of Denmark organization after Alexandria Eissinger decided to not compete at Miss Earth due to scheduling conflicts.

== Notes ==
Supermodel Helena Christensen began her career in 1986 as Miss Universe Denmark. In the same year, Pia Rosenberg Larsen won Miss Denmark and competed at Miss International, where she placed as first runner-up. In 1993, TV personality and actress Maria Hirse won Miss Universe Denmark, but like Helena Christensen, failed to place at Miss Universe.

This contest is unrelated to the Miss Denmark pageant.

== See also ==
- Miss Universe
