= Carolyn Seaward =

English actress and beauty pageant titleholder

- Born: Carolyn Ann Seaward; 20 December 1960 (age 65); Yelverton, Devon, England
- Height: 1.73 m (5 ft 8 in)
- Beauty pageant titleholder
- Title: Miss England 1979; Miss United Kingdom 1979
- Hair color: Blonde
- Eye color: Blue
- Major competitions: Miss Universe 1979 (2nd runner-up); Miss World 1979 (1st runner-up)

Carolyn Ann Seaward (born 20 December 1960 in Yelverton, Devon, England) is an English actress and beauty pageant titleholder. She also appeared in the 1983 Bond film Octopussy. She won Miss England and Miss United Kingdom in 1979. As Miss England, she was second runner-up at Miss Universe 1979. Then as Miss United Kingdom, she was first runner-up at Miss World 1979. Seaward is one of only three British beauty queens, along with Rosemarie Frankland and Helen Morgan, to have finished in the top three at both the Miss Universe and Miss World pageants.

== Early life ==
She originated from Clearbrook, Devon. She attended Tavistock College.

== Pageantry ==
=== Miss Universe ===
Seaward became Miss England in 1979 and represented her country in Perth, Western Australia at Miss Universe 1979 in July, winning the Photogenic Award and placing as second runner-up to eventual winner Maritza Sayalero of Venezuela. First runner-up was Gina Swainson of Bermuda. Seaward (as of 2024) remains the last English woman to reach the top three at Miss Universe.

=== Miss World ===
In the autumn of 1979 she won the Miss United Kingdom pageant, and went on to represent the UK in November at Miss World 1979, this time placing as first runner-up. The winner of the Miss World title was Bermuda's Gina Swainson, the first runner-up from Miss Universe. Seaward's second-place finish made her the third British beauty queen, and only one from England, to reach the top three at both Miss Universe and Miss World.

Seaward also appeared in the 1983 James Bond film Octopussy. In 2012, she appeared in the BBC Two documentary series Wonderland, in the episode, I Was Once a Beauty Queen.

Awards and achievements
Preceded by (Costa Rica) Maribel Fernández	Miss Universe - Photogenic Award; 1979	Succeeded by (New Zealand) Delyse Nottle
Preceded by Beverly Isherwood	Miss England; 1979	Succeeded by Julie Duckworth
Preceded by Elizabeth Ann Jones	Miss United Kingdom; 1979	Succeeded by Kim Ashfield
