= Miss Europe 1980 =

International beauty pageant

- Date: March 2, 1980
- Venue: Puerto de la Cruz Park, Santa Cruz, Canary Islands, Spain
- Entrants: 20
- Placements: 7
- Withdrawals: Cyprus
- Returns: Denmark; Malta; Scotland; Turkey; Wales
- Winner: Karin Zorn; Austria
- Congeniality: Marlene Vermeulen (Holland)

Miss Europe 1980, also referred to as Miss Europe 1979/80, was the 40th edition of the Miss Europe pageant and the 29th edition under the Mondial Events Organization. It was held at Puerto de la Cruz Park in Santa Cruz of Tenerife, Canary Islands, Spain on March 2, 1980. Karin Zorn of Austria was crowned Miss Europe 1980 by outgoing titleholder Eva Maria Düringer of Austria.

== Results ==
=== Placements ===
Placement	Contestant
Miss Europe 1980	Austria – Karin Zorn
1st Runner-Up	Belgium – Christine Linda Bernadette Cailliau
2nd Runner-Up	Spain – María Dolores Forner
3rd Runner-Up	Sweden – Christina Bolinder
4th Runner-Up	Norway – Anette Stai
Top 7	Germany – Andrea Hontschik; Holland – Marlene Vermeulen

=== Special awards ===
Award	Contestant
Miss Amity	Holland – Marlene Vermeulen
Miss Elegance	France – Sylvie Paréra
Miss Photogenic	Spain – María Dolores Forner

== Contestants ==
- Austria – Karin Zorn
- Belgium – Christine Linda Bernadette Cailliau
- Denmark – Lone Gladys Jørgensen
- England – Tracey Jessop
- Finland – Päivi Uitto
- France – Sylvie Hélène Marie Parera
- Germany – Andrea Hontschik
- Greece – Mika Dimitropoulou
- Holland – Marlene Vermeulen
- Iceland – Kristín Bernharðsdóttir
- Ireland – Maura McMenamim
- Italy – Franca Filone
- Malta – Brenda de Bono
- Norway – Anette Stai
- Scotland – Lorraine Davidson
- Spain – María Dolores "Lola" Forner Toro
- Sweden – Christina Bolinder
- Switzerland – Birgit Krahl
- Turkey – Serap Yalçın
- Wales – Janet Beverly Hobson

== Notes ==
=== Returns ===
- Denmark
- Malta
- Scotland
- Turkey
- Wales

=== Withdrawals ===
- Cyprus – Constantia Christodoulidou (Kostandino Christodoulidou)
