= Miss World Denmark =

Beauty contest

- Formation: 2004
- Type: Beauty pageant
- Purpose: Beauty with a Purpose
- Headquarters: Copenhagen
- Location: Denmark
- Members: Miss World
- Official language: Danish
- Director: Lisa Lents
- Parent organization: Miss and Mister of Denmark

Miss World Denmark is a beauty pageant that came into existence in 2004 when the Miss Denmark competition split into two separate competitions: Miss World Denmark and Miss Universe Denmark. The former Miss World 2008 contestant Lisa Lents, became the National Director of the pageant the year after her participation. When Lisa Lents represented Denmark at the Miss World competition, Unibet guessed that she would place fifth, while NordicBet guessed that she would come in first as the first contestant from Denmark in history. In the same year that Lents competed in Miss World, she also competed on the Danish National Taekwondo team at the European Taekwondo Championships in Antalya, Turkey.

After Lisa Lents became the Franchise of the pageant, Miss World Denmark pageant has become the biggest pageant in Denmark.

== Winners ==
- 2021 - TBA
- 2020 - No Pageant due to COVID-19 pandemic
- 2019 - Natasja Kunde
- 2018 - Tara Jensen
- 2017 - Amanda Petri
- 2016 - Helena Heuser
- 2015 - Jessica Josephina
- 2014 - Pernille Sørensen
- 2013 - Malene Riis Sørensen
- 2012 - Iris Thomsen (Top 30)
- 2011 - Maya Celeste Padillo Olesen
- 2010 - Natalya Averina
- 2009 - Nadia Ulbjerg Pedersen
- 2008 - Lisa Lents
- 2007 - Line Kruuse
- 2006 - Sandra Spohr
- 2005 - Trine Lundgaard Nielsen
- 2004 - Line Larsen
