= Turið Elinborgardóttir =

Faroese beauty pageant titleholder

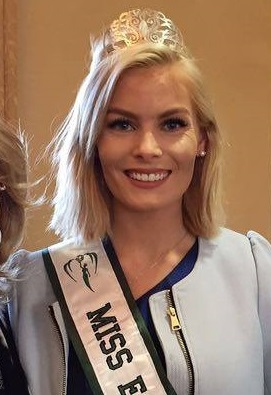
- Turið in the United States as part of her responsibilities as Miss Earth Denmark 2015
- Born: 1 March 1995 (age 31); Tórshavn, Faroe Islands
- Height: 1.76 m (5 ft 9 1/2 in)
- Beauty pageant titleholder
- Title: Miss Earth Denmark 2015
- Hair color: Blonde
- Eye color: Light blue
- Major competition: Miss Earth 2015

Turið Elinborgardóttir is a Faroese beauty pageant titleholder who was crowned as Miss Earth Denmark 2015. Three weeks before the Danish beauty pageant she was crowned as Miss Universe Faroe Islands on 25 July 2015 by the mayor of Tórshavn, Heðin Mortensen. Elinborgardóttir is the first Faroese national to compete in an international pageant. A Faroese designer, Laila av Reyni, designed her dress for the Danish competition, as well as the dresses of the other Danish contestants at the Miss Universe Denmark 2015.

== Miss Earth Denmark 2015 ==
Turið was crowned Miss Earth Denmark 2015 at AC Bella Sky Hotel, Copenhagen, Denmark on 15 August 2015.

Awards and achievements
| Preceded by Aisha Isabella Hansen | Miss Earth Denmark; 2015 | Succeeded by Alexandria Eissinger |
