= Helena Heuser =

Danish model

- Born: Helena Heuser; 13 November 1996 (age 29); Copenhagen, Denmark
- Height: 1.80 m (5 ft 11 in)
- Beauty pageant titleholder
- Title: Miss World Denmark 2016; Miss Universe Denmark 2018
- Hair color: Dark Brown
- Eye color: Blue
- Major competitions: Miss World Denmark 2016 (Winner); Miss World 2016 (Unplaced); Miss Universe Denmark 2018 (Winner); Miss Universe 2018 (Unplaced) (Miss Photogenic)

Helena Heuser (born 13 November 1996) is a Danish model and beauty pageant titleholder who was crowned Miss World Denmark 2016. She represented Denmark at the Miss World 2016 pageant on 18 December 2016 in Washington, D.C., and also represented her country in the Miss Universe 2018 pageant in Bangkok, Thailand on 17 December 2018. Heuser was known in both international pageants as the “Face Of The Pageant”. She is the 2nd women in Denmark to proceed both titles as Miss Universe Denmark and Miss World Denmark.

== Pageantry ==
=== Miss World Denmark 2016 ===
Helena Heuser was crowned Miss World Denmark 2016 at the finale held on 17 September 2016.

=== Miss World 2016 ===
Helena Heuser represented Denmark at the 66th edition of Miss World 2016 pageant which took place on 10 December 2016 at the Gaylord National Resort & Convention Center in the city of Washington, D.C. She placed in Top 20 in Miss Sport.

=== Miss Universe Denmark 2018 ===
Helena Heuser was crowned as Miss Universe Denmark 2018 pageant at the finale held on 9 September 2018.

=== Miss Universe 2018 ===
Heuser represented Denmark at the 67th edition of Miss Universe 2018 pageant which took place on 17 December 2018.

Awards and achievements
Preceded by Jessica Hvirvelkær	Miss Denmark; 2016	Succeeded by Amanda Petri
Preceded by Christina Mikkelsen	Miss Universe Denmark; 2018	Succeeded by Katja Stokholm
