= Wheels on Meals =

1984 Hong Kong film by Sammo Hung

- Film poster

Chinese name
- Traditional Chinese: 快餐車
- Simplified Chinese: 快餐车
Transcriptions
Standard Mandarin
- Hanyu Pinyin: Kuàicān Chē
Yue: Cantonese
- Jyutping: Faai3 Caan1 Ce1
- Directed by: Sammo Hung
- Written by: Edward Tang; Johnny Lee
- Produced by: Raymond Chow
- Starring: Jackie Chan; Sammo Hung; Yuen Biao; Lola Forner; Benny Urquidez; Pepe Sancho; Herb Edelman; Keith Vitali; Cheung Chung
- Cinematography: Arthur Wong; Cheung Yiu-tso; Francisco Riba
- Edited by: Peter Cheung Yiu-chung
- Music by: Chris Babida; Tang Siu-lam; Toshiyuki Kimori (Note: Chris Babida and Tang Siu-lam composed the original Cantonese soundtrack. Toshiyuki Kimori (under the alias Keith Morrison) composed the international soundtrack.)
- Distributed by: Golden Harvest
- Release date: 17 August 1984
- Running time: 104 minutes
- Country: Hong Kong
- Language: Cantonese
- Box office: US$13 million (est.)

Wheels on Meals (traditional Chinese: 快餐車; simplified Chinese: 快餐车) is a 1984 Hong Kong martial arts action comedy film written and directed by Sammo Hung, with action choreographed by Jackie Chan. The film stars Jackie Chan, Sammo Hung, Yuen Biao, Lola Forner, Benny Urquidez, and José Sancho. The film was shot in Barcelona, Spain.

The film was a box office hit in East Asia, including Japan where the film was released as Spartan X. The film was also well-received by critics for its comedy and action, particularly the final fight between Jackie Chan and Benny Urquidez, which is considered one of the greatest fight scenes of all time. Jackie Chan with his stunt team were nominated for Best Action Choreography, for both Wheels on Meals and Project A, at the 4th Hong Kong Film Awards, winning the award for Project A.

Wheels on Meals spawned the Spartan X franchise. In 1984, it was adapted into the video game Spartan X (released as Kung-Fu Master internationally), which laid the foundations for the beat 'em up genre of action games. The video game also had a sequel, Spartan X 2, and there was a Spartan X comic book series. The Spartan X franchise grossed an estimated total revenue of approximately US$134 million worldwide.

== Plot ==
Thomas and David are Chinese cousins who run a fast food van in Barcelona and practice martial arts in their spare time. They are friends with Moby, a bumbling Chinese assistant to a private investigator who passes him his business in Spain after fleeing from debtors. Moby's first job is to find the child of a maid who used to work for a wealthy family. After fending off a biker gang, Thomas and David pay a visit to David's insane father, Chen, who is in a mental institution, and bump into Sylvia, the daughter of David's father's resident girlfriend. Thomas encourages his cousin to try to ask her out on a date, but David chickens out of this.

Later that night, while at the van serving food, they inadvertently discover Sylvia is a pickpocket who pretends to be a prostitute to rob her patrons, and protect her from one of them. Taking her to their apartment, the cousins are enamored by her and attempt to seduce her while keeping their money away from her, humorously failing at both and waking to find Sylvia and their money gone. The following day, unknown men try to kidnap Sylvia but are accidentally frustrated by Moby, who previously crashed his car against hers (actually stolen from an Italian neighbor). Moby's employer finds out Sylvia is Gloria's daughter and orders him to rescue her.

Thomas and David find Sylvia again and save her from her patron's henchmen. After she reveals her tough life, they hire her as a waitress in their fast food business and have fun with her throughout Barcelona, although still trying and failing to woo her. One day, the unknown men return and try to kidnap Sylvia at the same time Moby finds her, leading to a chase in which the Chinese trio manage to thwart her pursuers thanks to their quick thinking and their van's gadgets. In the process, two of the thugs turn out to be excellent martial artists themselves, whom not even David and Thomas can defeat.

Eventually, the Chinese and Sylvia reunite with Moby's employer and threaten him with throwing him off the Sagrada Família unless he reveals all he knows. He explains Sylvia is the illegitimate daughter of Count Lobas, who raped his chambermaid Gloria. In his deathbed, the count confessed it and begged his wife to find Gloria and Sylvia, intending to leave them his sizable inheritance to keep it off the hands of his wicked brother Mondale. In three days, Sylvia will have to find Gloria and present themselves to the lawyers in order to reclaim the money. Thomas and David initially refuse to help her anymore knowing she's an aristocrat, but Moby shames them into staying in the team. They then stage a ruse to infiltrate the mental institution and rescue Gloria and Chen, who plan to marry. Upon leaving, Mondale's men arrive again, beat down the Chinese and kidnap the women.

Thomas, David and Moby raid the villains' castle to rescue the women. In a series of misadventures, the cousins are captured and taken to Mondale, but Moby frees them. A multiple battle takes place, with Thomas and David taking on the two thugs while Moby faces the similarly skilled Mondale in a duel of weapons. Thomas submits his opponent after an extraordinarily tough fight, while David also manages to knock out his with a jar, and together join Moby to defeat Mondale in the style of the Three Musketeers.

The final scene of the film shows Sylvia reunited with her family, although she asks Thomas and David to keep her in their payroll as a summer job. Moby asks the cousins to help him with a new mission to rescue an African president, but they jokingly refuse.

== Cast ==
- Jackie Chan – Thomas
- Sammo Hung – Moby
- Yuen Biao – David
- Lola Forner – Sylvia
- Benny Urquidez – Thug #1
- Keith Vitali – Thug #2
- Herb Edelman – Henry Matt
- José Sancho – Mondale
- Susanna Sentís – Gloria
- Amparo Moreno - Susana
- Josep Lluís Fonoll - Dino Martino
- Paul Chang – Mental Patient and David's father
- Richard Ng – Mental Patient (Brilliant)
- John Shum – Mental Patient (Laughing)
- Wu Ma – Mental Patient (Clock)
- Lau Sau-leung – Mondale Punk
- Blackie Ko – Delinquent Biker
- Mars
- Stanley Fung
- Luís Palenzuela
- Montserrat Julio
- Lluís Monte
- Josep Lluís Dallester
- Miguel Aniles
- Mercedes Albert

== Production ==
=== Title ===
The film's title was supposed to be Meals on Wheels. Superstitious Golden Harvest executives however demanded the title change because their two previous films with titles that began with the letter 'M' – Megaforce and Menage à Trois – were both box office flops.

=== Casting ===
The three action stars, Yuen, Chan, and Hung, are long time best friends and had been Peking Opera School colleagues in their youth. The release of Wheels on Meals came in the midst of their most prolific period working together as a trio. The three men had acted together on Chan's Project A and the first of Hung's original Lucky Stars trilogy, Winners and Sinners in 1983. Wheels on Meals was released in 1984, and a year later they were reunited twice more for the Lucky Stars semi-sequels My Lucky Stars and Twinkle, Twinkle Lucky Stars.

The film also features cameo appearances from fellow Lucky Stars Richard Ng and John Shum as mental patients in the hospital attended by David's father, Chen.

Wheels on Meals was the first of two films which paired star Jackie Chan against former professional kickboxing champion Benny Urquidez (the other being the 1988 film Dragons Forever).

Co-star Lola Forner appeared in another Jackie Chan film, Armour of God (1987).

=== Filming ===
Audio commentator Bey Logan explains why Sammo Hung decided to shoot the film outside of Hong Kong. By the time it was made in 1984, shooting in Hong Kong had become practically impossible – firstly, because the action stars had become so famous that they could not walk through the streets with impunity, and secondly due to the mounting difficulties in obtaining a permit from the government in order to film in Hong Kong. Bruce Lee had paved the way for Hong Kong filmmakers shooting abroad with the 1972 film Way of the Dragon, whose location filming was done in Italy, whereas the interiors had been shot at Golden Harvest studio.

When Hung took his cast and crew to Barcelona, he wanted to strongly establish the locations in Barcelona as real, and to avoid shooting interiors at Golden Harvest. In comparison to Hong Kong, the Spanish authorities were very cooperative in allowing the use of locations for filming, even for car chases and fight scenes.

== Reception ==
=== Box office ===
During its Hong Kong theatrical run, Wheels on Meals grossed HK$21,465,013 (US$2,745,589), becoming the fifth highest-grossing film of the year in Hong Kong. In Taiwan, where it ran during September–October 1984, it became the third highest-grossing film of the year, earning NT$23,455,346 (US$601,075).

In Japan, where it released as Spartan X, it grossed ¥2.02 billion (US$8.5 million), becoming the sixth highest-grossing foreign film of 1985. In South Korea, it was the second highest-grossing film of 1985, with 307,751 box admissions in Seoul, equivalent to an estimated ₩1,077,128,500 (US$1,238,050). Combined, the film's total estimated box office gross in East Asia was approximately US$13,084,714, equivalent to US$41 million adjusted for inflation.

=== Critical response ===
The film was generally well-received by critics. Jamie Havlin of Louder Than War called it "one of the most highly regarded martial-arts comedies ever made." Casimir Harlow of AVForums rated it 9 out of 10, calling it "a hugely fun, thoroughly imaginative and frequently action packed affair." Justin Bowyer of Empire rated it three out of five stars, praising the action and comedy while criticizing the lack of plot. David Rees of Asian Action Cinema rated it 8 out of 10, calling it "an altogether very enjoyable if at times silly romp." John Krewson of The A.V. Club criticized the excess of "silly fat/butt/boob jokes" and edits that call attention to themselves, but felt the film had heart and an impressive fight sequence between Chan and Urquidez. He concluded it was "not a must-see", but not bad either. David Poplar of The Digital Fix rated it 8 out of 10, describing it as a "vintage Jackie Chan slapstick comedy featuring some astonishing choreography".

The final fight between Jackie Chan and Benny Urquidez is considered one of the greatest fight scenes of all time. The climax leading up to that, involving Thomas climbing a Spanish castle to rescue Sylvia (with the help of Moby and David) and fighting enemies along the way, has been compared to Bruce Lee's Game of Death (1972).

=== Awards and nominations ===
- 1985 Hong Kong Film Awards:
  - Nominated: Best Action Choreography

== Home release ==
On 30 January 2006, DVD was released in a two disc platinum edition at Hong Kong Legends in UK in Region 2.

Unlike the majority of Chan's later films, the standard DVD release of Wheels on Meals does not contain the usual outtakes over the final credits. However, a VHS release of the film did exist in the mid-1980s under the title Spartan X, which has the outtakes intact.

The 2019 region B blu-ray from Eureka! features the film with 5 different alternate audio track mixes in both English and Cantonese as well as extras that interview Yuen Biao, Stanley Tong and Sammo Hung.

In 2023, Shout Factory released remastered Blu-rays of Chan's movies with the "Wheels on Meals" movie including a special audio commentary, a documentary entitled "Break-Neck Brilliance: A New Era Of Jackie Chan And Skeleton-Shattering Stunts", outtake footage, the theatrical trailer, and stills gallery.

== Spartan X franchise ==
=== Video games ===
The film was adapted into an arcade video game called Spartan X (the film's Japanese title), developed by Irem in 1984. It is a loose adaptation of the film's final part, which involves Thomas climbing the castle to rescue Sylvia. The game also borrows heavily from the Bruce Lee film Game of Death (1972). It was re-titled Kung-Fu Master for Western markets without using the film's license. The arcade game laid the foundations for the beat 'em up genre, and inspired Super Mario Bros. (1985), Street Fighter (1987), the French film Kung Fu Master (1988), and the Red Ribbon Army saga in the manga and anime series Dragon Ball.

The game was ported to the Famicom/NES console in 1985 as Spartan X in Japan, and released as Kung Fu in Western markets. The Famicom/NES version sold 3.5 million cartridges, including 1.42 million in Japan and 2.08 million overseas. At a retail price of ¥5,292, the game grossed an estimated ¥7.515 billion (US$69 million) in Japan. Internationally, at a retail price of US$24.99, the game grossed an estimated US$52 million overseas, bringing the game's estimated worldwide retail sales revenue to approximately US$121 million.

The game had two sequels. Vigilante was released for arcades in 1988. Spartan X 2 was released in Japan for the Famicom console in 1991.

An image of Thomas, Chan's character in the film, was used in the title screen and cutscene of the 1995 unlicensed Super Famicom game Hong Kong 97 as the game's character, Chin, a fictional relative to Bruce Lee.

=== Comic books ===
Between 1997 and 1998, a series of Spartan X comic books were published. Three issues of Jackie Chan's Spartan X: The Armour of Heaven were published in 1997, and four issues of Jackie Chan's Spartan X: Hell Bent Hero For Hire were published in 1998.

== See also ==
- Jackie Chan filmography
- Sammo Hung filmography
- Yuen Biao filmography
