= Miss Denmark 2022 =

Beauty pageant

- Date: August 28, 2022
- Venue: Grand Sierra Resort in Copenhagen
- Broadcaster: YouTube
- Entrants: 33
- Placements: 15
- Winner: Malou Peters; Storstrøm
- Congeniality: Banuscha Baskaran (Vestdanmark)
- Best National Costume: Malou Peters (Storstrøm)
- Photogenic: Michelle Desideriussen (Bornholm)
- Miss World Denmark: Maja Bach (Vestsjælland)

Miss Denmark 2022 was the 9th edition of the Miss Denmark pageant, was held on August 28, 2022 at Grand Sierra Resort in Copenhagen. Sara Langtved of Københavns Amt crowned her successor Malou Peters of Storstrøm at the end of the event. The winner represented Denmark at the Miss Universe 2022 and Miss Supranational 2023 pageants. The selected Miss World Denmark participates in Miss World 2022 while the three runner-ups participate at the Miss International 2022, Miss Earth 2022, and Miss Grand International 2022 pageants.

== Candidates ==
These are the contestants that competed for the title.

Representing		Candidate	Age	Height	Hometown
Århus	Aarhus	Helene Myrdal	26	1.74 m (5 ft 9 in)	Aarhus
Bornholm	Bornholm	Michelle Desideriussen	27	1.76 m (5 ft 9 in)	Kastrup
Frederiksborg	Frederiksborg	Jessica Pscheidt	27	1.76 m (5 ft 9 in)	Copenhagen
Hovedstad	Capital City	Camilla Andersen	25	1.79 m (5 ft 10 in)	Copenhagen
Københavns Amt	Copenhagen County	Jasmin El-Khodr	23	1.76 m (5 ft 9 in)	Copenhagen
Lillebælt Øgruppe	Little Belt Archipelago	Miamaja Isabel Langenbach	26	1.76 m (5 ft 9 in)	Nykøbing Falster
Midtgrønland	Central Greenland	Claire Schou-Rasmussen	20	1.75 m (5 ft 9 in)	Solrød Strand
Midtjylland	Central Jutland	Nicoline Kirstine Hansen	19	1.73 m (5 ft 8 in)	Hornsyld
Nedrefærø	Lower Faroe Islands	Karoline Sargent-Nimgaard	18	1.74 m (5 ft 9 in)	Strøby Egede
Nedrefyn	Lower Funen	Emilie Lærkegaard-Andersen	18	1.80 m (5 ft 11 in)	Odense
Norddanmark	North Denmark	Nadja Reinhardt-Sjøgaard	23	1.76 m (5 ft 9 in)	Aarhus
Nordgrønland	North Greenland	Rikke Skovly Petersen	19	1.84 m (6 ft 0 in)	Roskilde
Nordjylland	North Jutland	Ann-Sofie Bisgaard-Christiansen	17	1.74 m (5 ft 9 in)	Aalborg
Nordsjælland	North Zealand	Josephine Amalie Pedersen	18	1.76 m (5 ft 9 in)	Gilleleje
Øresund Øgruppe	Øresund Archipelago	Cecilia Matine Larsen	24	1.73 m (5 ft 8 in)	Greve
Østdanmark	East Denmark	Melina Mira	18	1.78 m (5 ft 10 in)	Albertslund
Østgrønland	East Greenland	Zaara Naaz-Ahmed	17	1.77 m (5 ft 10 in)	Albertslund
Øvrefærø	Upper Faroe Islands	Victoria Arvin Lautrup	26	1.83 m (6 ft 0 in)	Frederiksværk
Øvrefyn	Upper Funen	Sabine Hansen	23	1.74 m (5 ft 9 in)	Svendborg
Ribe	Ribe	Stephanie Bagge	18	1.76 m (5 ft 9 in)	Naestved
Ringkjøbing	Ringkjebing	Mathilde Michelle Laursen	17	1.75 m (5 ft 9 in)	Copenhagen
Roskilde	Roskilde	Cecilie Frost Wittchen	24	1.80 m (5 ft 11 in)	Roskilde
Storebælt Øgruppe	Great Belt Archipelago	Rebecca Larsen	24	1.74 m (5 ft 9 in)	Agersø
Storstrøm	Storstrem	Malou Peters	20	1.80 m (5 ft 11 in)	Naestved
Syddanmark	South Denmark	Thalia Ortiz Rasmussen	21	1.83 m (6 ft 0 in)	Sonderborg
Sydgrønland	South Greenland	Anniqa Jamal Iqbal	20	1.76 m (5 ft 9 in)	Soborg
Sydjylland	South Jutland	Lara Al Medrasi	19	1.75 m (5 ft 9 in)	Copenhagen
Sydsjælland	South Zealand	Hella Sofia Bach	18	1.74 m (5 ft 9 in)	Naestved
Vejle	Vejle	Melanie Denise Hansen	18	1.76 m (5 ft 9 in)	Vejle
Vestdanmark	West Denmark	Banuscha Baskaran	22	1.76 m (5 ft 9 in)	Struer
Vestgrønland	West Greenland	Mathilde Vangkilde	18	1.73 m (5 ft 8 in)	Naestved
Vestsjælland	West Zealand	Maja Bach	20	1.73 m (5 ft 8 in)	Kalundborg
Viborg	Viborg	Warda Abdiaziz	21	1.75 m (5 ft 9 in)	Copenhagen
