= Ena Sandra Causevic =

Danish model from Sønderborg, Denmark

- Born: Ena Sandra Causevic; 21 August 1989 (age 37); Sønderborg, Denmark
- Height: 5 ft 8 in (1.73 m)
- Beauty pageant titleholder
- Title: Miss Universe Denmark 2010
- Major competitions: Miss Universe Denmark 2010 (Winner); Miss Universe 2010 (Unplaced)

Ena Sandra Causevic (Serbo-Croatian: Čaušević; born 21 August 1989) is a Danish model and beauty pageant titleholder. She was appointed to represent Denmark in Las Vegas at the Miss Universe 2010 pageant. Besides her work as a model she has studied communications and has participated in charities for families with cancer affected children.
