= Victoria Kjær Theilvig =

Danish model and Miss Universe 2024 (born 2003)

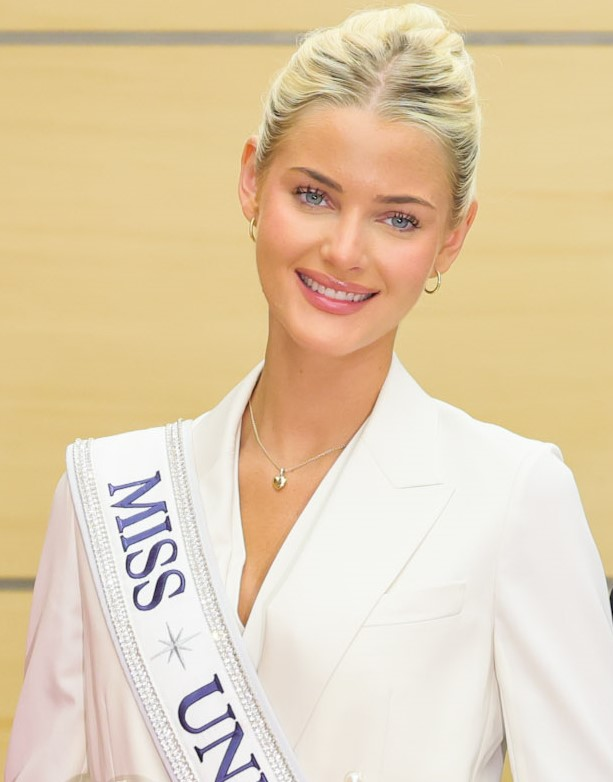
- Kjær Theilvig in 2025
- Born: Victoria Kjær Theilvig; 13 November 2003 (age 22); Herlev, Denmark
- Height: 5 ft 10 in (178 cm)
- Beauty pageant titleholder
- Title: Miss Grand Denmark 2022; Miss Universe Denmark 2024; Miss Universe 2024
- Hair color: Blond
- Eye color: Blue
- Major competitions: Miss Denmark 2021; (2nd Runner-Up); Miss Grand International 2022; (Top 20); Miss Universe 2024; (Winner)

Victoria Kjær Theilvig (Danish pronunciation: [vikˈtsʰoɐ̯ˀi.æ ˈkʰeˀɐ̯ ˈtsʰɑjlˌvi, vikˈtsʰoɐ̯ˀjæ -]; born 13 November 2003) is a Danish beauty pageant titleholder who was crowned Miss Universe 2024. Theilvig is the first Dane to win the title, and also the first woman with blonde hair to win the title in more than 20 years.

== Early life ==
Victoria Kjær Theilvig was born on 13 November 2003 in Herlev, a suburb of Copenhagen, where she was raised. Kjær Theilvig attended Lyngby Handelsgymnasium, where she studied business and marketing. Kjær Theilvig afterwards became a professional dancer, and advocated for mental health awareness, animal rights, and entrepreneurship in the beauty industry.

== Pageantry ==
=== Initial stints ===
Kjær Theilvig began competing in pageants after becoming a contestant for Miss Denmark 2021, where she placed as the second runner-up. She was appointed Miss Grand Denmark in 2022, which allowed her to compete in the Miss Grand International 2022 pageant, where she finished in the top 20.

=== Miss Universe 2024 ===
In 2024, Kjær Theilvig was appointed Miss Universe Denmark after the winner of the Miss Denmark 2024 pageant, Emma Heyst, opted not to compete at Miss Universe 2024. Heyst competed at the Miss World 2025 pageant, where she did not place.

As Miss Universe Denmark, Kjær Theilvig competed in and won Miss Universe 2024, held on 16 November in Mexico City. Kjær Theilvig became the first Danish woman to be crowned Miss Universe and the first blonde winner since Jennifer Hawkins of Australia at Miss Universe 2004. She is the second Danish woman to win any of the big four international beauty pageants, following Catharina Svensson at Miss Earth 2001.

During the preliminary competition, Kjær Theilvig presented a national costume as a Viking warrior goddess with red and golden ornamentation. She progressed to the top five question-and-answer round, where she was asked about how differently she would live her life if she knew she would not be judged. In her answer, she stated that she would not change anything about her life and instead maintain a positive outlook on life. During the second question-answer-round, Kjær Theilvig was asked to address the women who were watching her. In response, she gave a message on resilience and self-confidence in one's aspirations.

At the end of the event, Kjær Theilvig was crowned Miss Universe 2024 by outgoing titleholder Sheynnis Palacios of Nicaragua. Accordingly, she is the first winner to wear the Light of Infinity golden pearl crown unveiled by the Miss Universe Organization that same year.

In November 2024, Kjær Theilvig received criticism for mouthing the term "nigga" while lip-syncing the original lyrics of the song "Empire State of Mind" at the Empire State Building for a TikTok video. While Miss Denmark Organization denied that she lip-synched the term, the video was removed from the site.

In her capacity as Miss Universe, Kjær Theilvig traveled to Mexico, the United States, Thailand, the United Arab Emirates, Indonesia, India, Puerto Rico, the Netherlands, the Philippines, and her home country of Denmark.

Awards and achievements
Preceded by (Nicaragua) Sheynnis Palacios	Miss Universe; 2024	Succeeded by (Mexico) Fátima Bosch
Preceded by Nikoline Hansen	Miss Universe Denmark; 2024	Succeeded by Monique Sonne
Preceded by Natasja Kunde	Miss Grand Denmark; 2022	Succeeded by Sille Albertsen
