= Spartan X 2 =

1991 video game

- Front cover art
- Developer: Tamtex
- Publisher: Irem
- Series: Spartan X (Kung-Fu Master)
- Platform: Family Computer
- Release: JP: September 27, 1991
- Genre: Beat 'em up
- Mode: Single-player

Spartan X 2 (スパルタンＸ２, Suparutan Ekusu Tsū) is a 1991 beat 'em up video game developed by Tamtex and published by Irem exclusively in Japan for the Family Computer. It is a sequel to Irem's 1984 coin-operated video game Spartan X (released internationally by Data East under the title of Kung-Fu Master), which was later ported to the Family Computer by Nintendo in 1985. In turn, Spartan X was originally a tie-in to the 1984 Jackie Chan film Wheels on Meals (released as Spartan X in Japan).

It was originally planned to be released in North America as Kung Fu II in the fall of 1991, but ended up not being released there. Spartan X 2 did not receive a North American release until 2016, when it was included as a built-in title for the Retro-Bit Generations retro video game console under the name Kung-Fu Master 2.

== Plot ==
"The city has been corrupted by drugs for some time. Johnny Thomas, a man who lost his mother and sister as a result of his father being used as an experiment for a new kind of drug, is the only man who opposes the drug syndicates. After the incident, Thomas left the corrupted police department he was working for and became a private secret agent in order to investigate the illegal trafficking routes in his city. During his investigation, he learns that an international criminal organization known as "Hawk" is responsible for the majority of the drugs that have sneaked into the country."

— Translated from the game's manual

Somewhat more faithful to the plot of the movie than the first Spartan X entry, it attempts to tell the same story: In Barcelona, Mr. X has captured the pickpocket Silvia. In order to get her back, Thomas, a Kung-Fu master who runs a restaurant must travel the city, eventually reaching Mr. X's castle and attempt to rescue her.

== Gameplay ==
The player takes control of Johnny Thomas, an undercover investigator tasked with fighting a drug syndicate. There are a total of six stages in the game, each with its own boss. Whereas the original game was set entirely in a five-story pagoda, the stages of Spartan X 2 consist of different locations which include a train, a warehouse, a boat, an airplane, a mansion, and a drug plant. When the player clears a stage, only a certain portion of the player's vitality will be restored. However, the player can also restore their vitality during the course of each stage by picking up the Stamina X potions left behind by certain enemies. In addition to all of Thomas's moves from the original game, the player can also perform two new moves while crouching for an extended period: an uppercut and an over-the-shoulder throw.
