= Calle nueva =

Spanish TV soap opera

- Genre: Soap opera, Drama
- Developed by: Zeppelin TV
- Directed by: Tito Rojas
- Starring: Patricia Adriani; José Conde; Juán Gea; Fabiola Toledo; Damián Velasco
- Country of origin: Spain
- Original language: Spanish
- No. of seasons: 3
- No. of episodes: 560

Production
- Camera setup: Multi-camera
- Running time: 30 minutes

Original release
- Network: La 1
- Release: September 28, 1997 – June 30, 2000

Calle nueva was a Spanish TV soap opera which was aired in Televisión Española between 1997 and 2000.

== Plot ==
The series tells the story of human relationships that develop between the residents of a poor neighborhood of any Spanish city. In which the characters move in and out of the plot, the story opens with the arrival on Calle Nueva of Lucía, a woman and mother of a family touched by personal tragedy following the arrest of her husband Estéban. From the second season, the spotlight will fall on Susana, an executive who recently arrived from New York City.

== Cast ==
- Patricia Adriani...Lucía Torres
- Juan Gea...Esteban
- José Conde...Julio
- Damián Velasco...Tomás
- Fabiola Toledo...Mónica
- Bruno Squarcia... Pedro
- Remedios Cervantes... Susana
- Andoni Ferreño... Luis
- Cristina Higueras
- Helio Pedregal
- Lola Forner... Álex Maldonado
- Francisco Merino... Félix
- Amparo Soto... Leonor
- Claudia Molina... Carlota
- Rebeca Tébar... Esther
- Lucía Napal... Blanca
- Luís Ángel Priego
- Alberto Maneiro... César
- David Alemán... Roque
- Karla Sofía Gascón... Oscar
- Amparo Bravo... Bibiana
- Carmen Roldán... Carmen
- Raquel Vega... Eva
- Ángel Alcázar... Ramos
- Marta Molina... Laura
- Victoria Oliver... Carol
- Aurora Mestre... Teresa
- Eloísa Martín... Maribel
- Tita Planells... Conchita
- Pilar Castro... Sandra
- Maribel Rivera... Virginia
- Carlos Manuel Díaz... Mateo
- Antonio Galeano... Niko
- Luis Lázaro... Vicente
- Jesús González... Cosme
- Carlos Soriano... Antonio
- José Bernal... Gonzalo
- Roberto Alcaraz... Octavio
- Kezia Dos Santos... Rosa
- César Lucendo... Dani
- Felipe Jimenez.... Ruben
- Enrique Escudero... Florencio
- Angela Thompson Georgas... Corrina
- Jaime Martín... Ángel Montalvo
- Yoima Valdés... Luna Ojeda (1999-2000)
- Paco Churruca... Inspector Crespo
- Yolanda Arestegui
- Carlos Kaniowsky
- Sheyla González
- Álvaro Monje
- María Jurado
- Gonzalo Gonzalo
- Francisco Maestre... El Golem
- Sandra Toral... Rosalía de Ojeda
