= Lola Forner =

Spanish actress (born 1960)

- Born: María Dolores Forner Toro; 6 June 1960 (age 66); Alicante, Spain
- Occupation: Actress

María Dolores Forner Toro (born 6 June 1960 in Alicante, Spain), popularly known as Lola Forner, is a Spanish actress and beauty pageant titleholder. She was crowned Miss Spain 1979 and competed in Miss World 1979 and Miss Europe 1980. She is famous for starring alongside Jackie Chan in the movies Wheels on Meals (1984) and Armour of God (1986).

== Biography ==
Forner's sudden rise to fame came in 1979 when, after being crowned Miss Madrid, she won the Miss Spain pageant, held that year in the Catalan town of Lloret de Mar (Girona). She was also a semifinalist in Miss World 1979 and 2nd Runner-Up in Miss Europe 1980.

The fame Forner achieved allowed her to start her career as a model and, above all, to make her first forays into the world of acting. Just a few months after winning the contest, director Pedro Masó cast her to play the youngest of Alberto Closas children in La familia, bien, gracias, the third of a series of films about the adventures of a large Spanish family.

During the 1980s, Forner developed a modest film career, appearing in titles such as La venganza del lobo negro (Duel to the Death) (1981), El lobo negro (The Black Wolf) (1981) (both by Rafael Romero Marchent), El último penalty (The Last Penalty) (1984), by Martín Garrido, and Pareja enloquecida busca madre de alquiler (Crazy Couple Seeks Surrogate Mother) (1990), by Mariano Ozores. She also made forays into international co-productions, working on Wheels on Meals (1984) and Armour of God (1987) alongside Jackie Chan.

Since the 1990s, Forner has focused her appearances on television (where she made her debut in 1983 with Las Pícaras, followed a year later by Los desastres de la guerra, alongside Sancho Gracia), and she has been seen presenting (Ricos y famosos, 1990, a magazine program broadcast by Antena 3 (Spanish TV channel) in its first months of existence) and acting (Amor de papel, 1993, a telenovela filmed in Venezuela; La forja de un rebelde, 1990, by Mario Camus; Calle nueva, 1998; La familia... 30 años después, 1999; El secreto, 2001 and En nombre del amor, Televisa 2008 filmed in Mexico).

== Filmography ==
- The Family, Fine, Thanks (1979) - María
- Cuatro locos buscan manicomio (1980) - Teenager (uncredited)
- El Lobo negro (1981) - Isabel
- Dos y dos, cinco (1981) - Tina
- Duelo a muerte (1981) - Isabel
- Los Desastres de la guerra (1983, TV Series)
- Project A (1983) - British Admiral's daughter
- Shouts of Anxiety (1984) - Pilar
- Wheels on Meals (1984) - Sylvia
- El Último penalty (1984) - Lena
- Armour of God (1986) - May
- White Apache (1987) - Rising Sun
- Scalps (1987) - Connor's mistress
- Mikola a Mikolko (1988) - Zora
- Leyenda del cura de Bargota, La (1990, TV Movie) - Doña Beatriz
- La forja de un rebelde (1990, TV Series) - Carmen ierraguirre
- Pareja enloquecida busca madre de alquiler (1990) - Lola
- Non, ou A Vã Glória de Mandar (1990) - Princess Doña Isabel
- Ricos y famosos (1990, TV Series) - Hostess
- Amor de papel (1993, TV Series) - Rebeca de Cordova
- Curro Jiménez:el regreso de una leyenda (1995, TV series) - Clara
- Tu pasado me condena (1996, TV Movie)
- Calle Nueva (1998, TV Series) - Alex
- La familia... 30 años después (1999, TV Movie) - María Alonso
- Paraíso (2000, TV Series) - Sonia
- El Secreto (2001, TV Series) - Elena Vega Montalbán
- Lisístrata (2002) - Colonia
- En nombre del amor (2008) - Carmén Iprraguirre
