= Nikoline Hansen =

Danish model who is Miss Denmark 2023

- Born: 17 October 2002 (age 23); Copenhagen, Denmark
- Occupation: Customer service
- Height: 1.80 m (5 ft 11 in)
- Beauty pageant titleholder
- Title: Miss Denmark 2023
- Major competitions: Miss Denmark 2023 (Winner); Miss Universe 2023 (Unplaced)

Nikoline Uhrenholt Hansen (born 17 October 2002) is a Danish beauty pageant titleholder who was crowned Miss Denmark 2023 and represented her country at Miss Universe 2023.

== Early life ==
Hansen was born on 17 October 2002 to Brian Hansen and Susan Uhrenholt in Nibe, Denmark. She won the prize as the best charity ambassador for her work with the Danish Heart Organization. Hansen was an employee of Carl's Jr. Danmark in Aalborg in early 2020 before being a supervisor on the same company in June 2021. In 2021 she was reported working for Teleperformance in Crete, Greece as a customer service agent.

=== Education ===
Hansen graduated in 2021 from Aalborg Handelsskole with diploma in business. In 2022, she enrolled at Copenhagen Business Academy in Copenhagen to study marketing.

== Pageantry ==
=== Miss Denmark 2023 ===
Hansen won the Miss Denmark 2023 contest held in August, 2023, in Copenhagen, besting 29 other candidates. The runners-up were Fatmagül Karabacak, Naja Mathilde Rosing, Julie Brink and Sille Albertsen as 1st to 4th runners-up.

=== Miss Universe 2023 ===
Hansen represented Denmark at the 72nd Miss Universe competition held in El Salvador on November 18, 2023. This marked the country's return to the Miss Universe pageant after skipping the prior contest.

Awards and achievements
Preceded by Malou Posberg Peters	Miss Denmark; 2023	Succeeded by Emma Heyst
Preceded by Malou Posberg Peters	Miss Universe Denmark; 2023	Succeeded by Victoria Kjær Theilvig
