= Miss Denmark 2019 =

- Date: 7 June 2019
- Presenters: Claus Elming
- Venue: Cirkusbygningen, Copenhagen
- Broadcaster: Livestream
- Entrants: 27
- Placements: 15
- Winner: Katja Stokholm; Funen

Miss Denmark 2019 the 93rd Miss Denmark pageant was held at Cirkusbygningen in Copenhagen on 7 June 2019. The winner represented Denmark at Miss Universe 2019.

== Official delegates ==
The 25 national delegates competing at Miss Denmark 2019 were:

Represents	Contestant	Age
Aalborg	Amanda Stefanie Hansen	26
Aarhus	Helene Hylling	24
Aero	Sabrina Jovanovic	22
Als	Josephine Lykke Andersen	21
Bornholm	UNKNOWN	20
Copenhagen	Khali Hashi	20
Esbjerg	Pernille Kilhof	21
Faroe Islands	Stinna Petersen	26
Frederiksberg	Louise Voss Skotner	20
Funen	Katja Stokholm	23
Greenland	Laila Hasanovic-Kuusak	22
Kolding	Maria Victoria Olesen	23
Langeland	Sara Langtved	27
Lolland	Monika Midjord Nolsøe	20
Mors	Carla-Sofie Vrang	18
North Copenhagen	Narvini Dery	19
North Denmark	Anne Dalum	19
Odense	Juliane Mathiasen	23
Randers	Dana Myrvig	18
Rømø	Sandra Jørgensen	18
Roskilde	Michaela Keller	26
South Denmark	Maria Faarkrog	20
Vejle	Nikita Silberg	21
Viborg	Petra Reigstad	21
West Zealand	Maria Mawuena	26
