= Miss Universe 1979 =

28th Miss Universe pageant

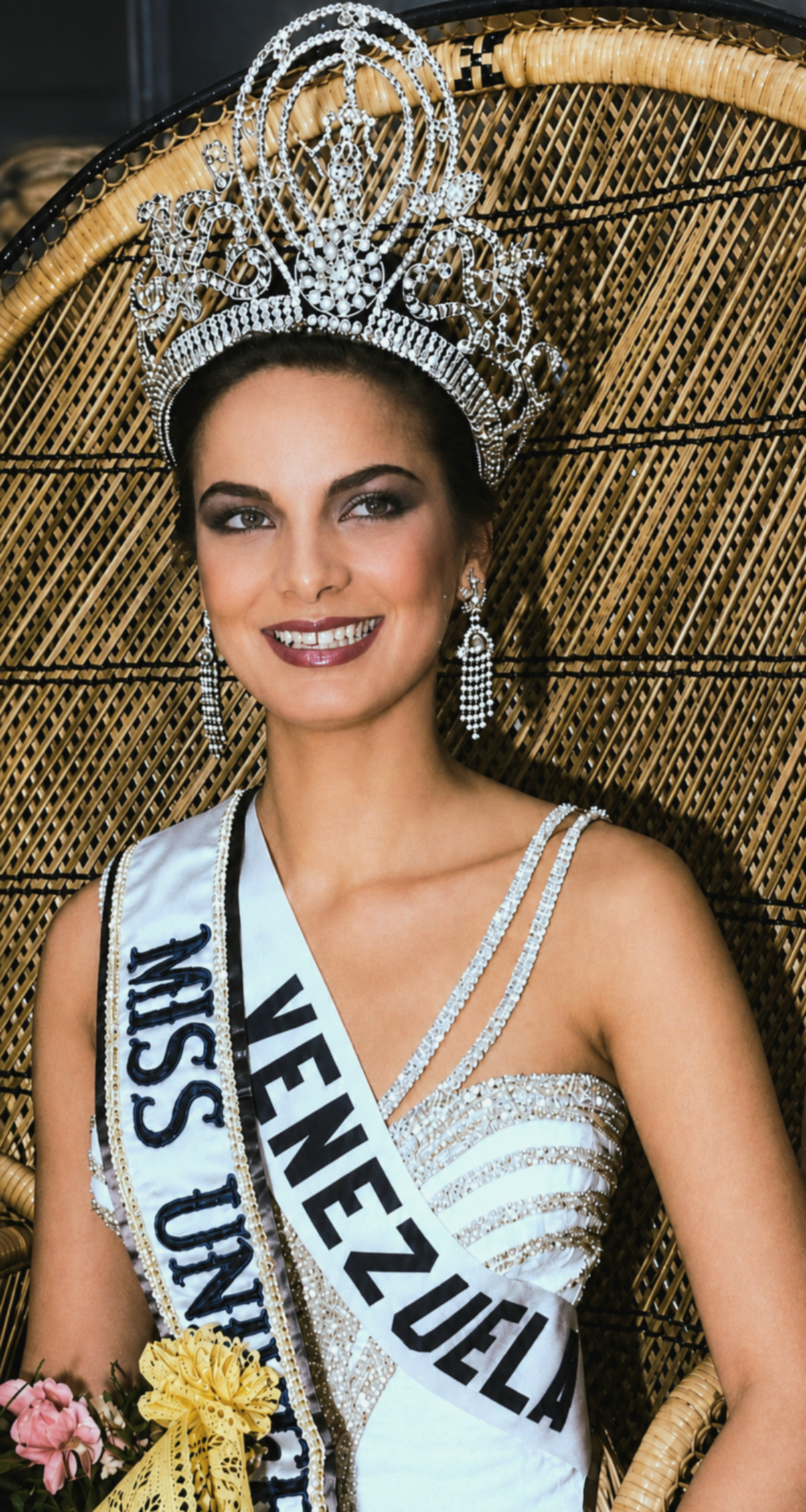
- Maritza Sayalero
- Date: 20 July 1979 (Note: The event was held at 8:00 am Australia Time (UTC+08:00); for the Americas, this was July 19 in their local times including the United States.)
- Presenters: Bob Barker; Helen O'Connell; Jayne Kennedy
- Entertainment: Donny Osmond
- Venue: Perth Entertainment Centre, Perth, Australia
- Broadcaster: CBS (international); Seven Network (TVW) (official broadcaster)
- Entrants: 75
- Placements: 12
- Debuts: Bophuthatswana; Fiji; Transkei
- Withdrawals: American Samoa; Bonaire; Curaçao; Lebanon; Lesotho; Morocco; New Hebrides; Nicaragua
- Returns: Antigua; British Virgin Islands; Mauritius; Portugal; Saint Kitts
- Winner: Maritza Sayalero; Venezuela
- Congeniality: Yurika Kuroda (Japan)
- Best National Costume: Elizabeth Busti (Uruguay)
- Photogenic: Carolyn Seaward (England)

Miss Universe 1979 was the 28th Miss Universe pageant, held at the Perth Entertainment Centre in Perth, Australia, on 20 July 1979. It was the first time in the pageant's history that the event was held in Australia.

At the conclusion of the event, Margaret Gardiner of South Africa crowned her successor Maritza Sayalero of Venezuela as Miss Universe 1979. This is first victory of Venezuela in the pageant's history.

Contestants from seventy-five countries and territories participated in this year's pageant. The pageant was hosted by Bob Barker in his thirteenth consecutive year, while Helen O'Connell provided commentary and analysis throughout the event. Donny Osmond performed in this edition.

== Background ==
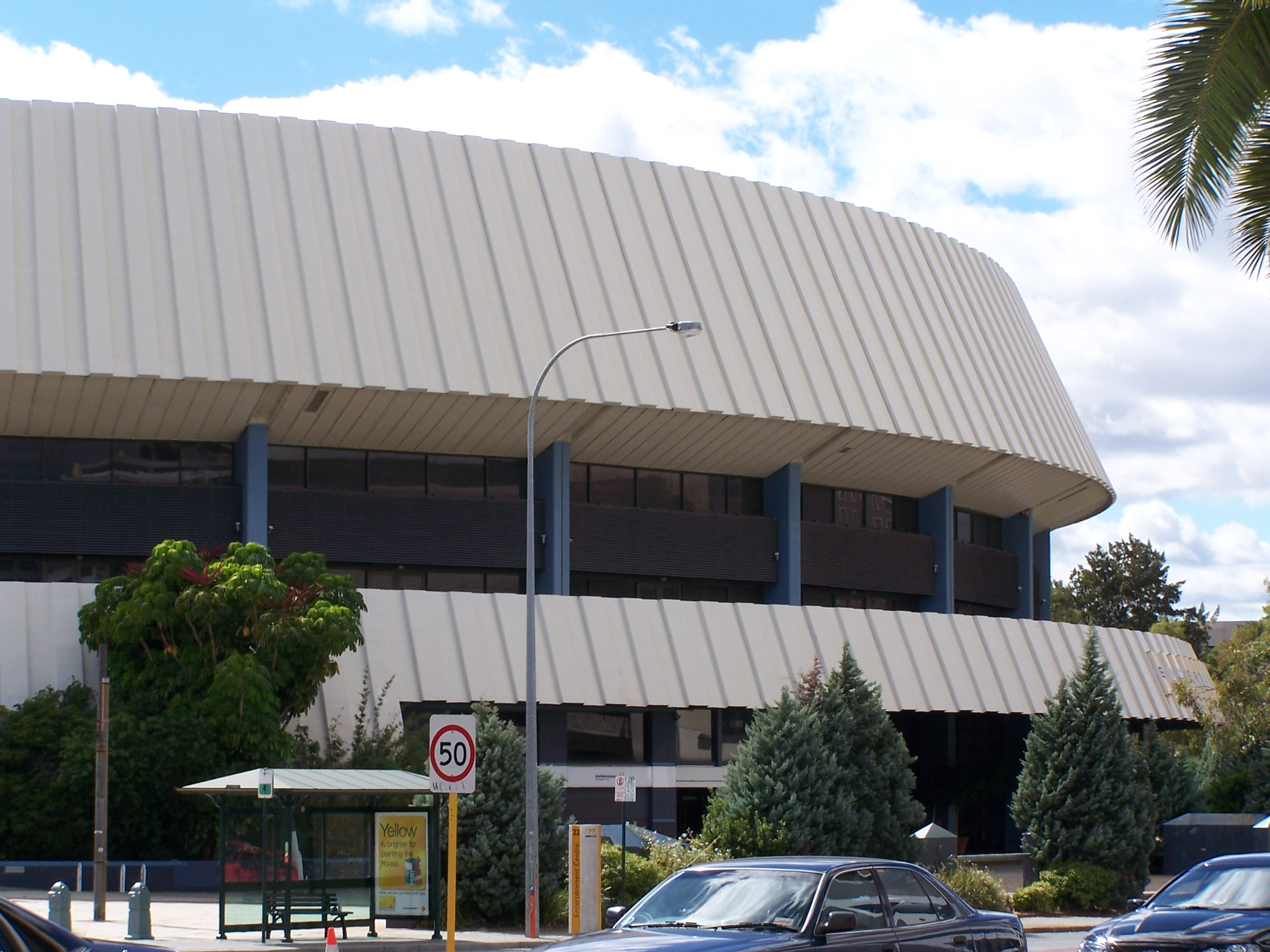
Perth Entertainment Centre, venue of the pageant

=== Location and date ===
On 21 September 1976, former Premier of Western Australia Sir Charles Court announced that the Miss Universe pageant would be held at the Perth Entertainment Centre in Perth in 1979. The Miss Universe pageant in Perth was one of the activities marking Western Australia's 150th anniversary in 1979.

On 11 July 1979, Skylab—the first crewed orbital laboratory—descended from Earth's orbit and fell into the Indian Ocean. While most of the satellite's components landed in the Indian Ocean, many parts were scattered and reached Western Australia, where the Miss Universe pageant was taking place at the time. One of the satellite fragments was found in Esperance, 500 miles from Perth, and was brought to Perth to serve as a backdrop for the Miss Universe pageant.

=== Selection of participants ===
Contestants from seventy-five countries and territories were selected to compete in the pageant. One candidate was selected to replace the original winner.

==== Replacements ====
Elvira Puglisi was appointed to represent Italy after Alba Parietti, Miss Universe Italy 1979, withdrew due to scheduling conflicts.

==== Debuts, returns, and, withdrawals ====
This edition saw the debuts of Bophuthatswana, Fiji, and Transkei, and the returns of Portugal which last competed in 1974; and Antigua, the British Virgin Islands, Mauritius, and Saint Christopher-Nevis-Anguilla which last competed in 1977.

Patricia Pineda Chamorro of Nicaragua withdrew due to personal reasons. It was reported that her family allegedly received death threats because of her participation in Miss Universe. American Samoa, Bonaire, Curaçao, Lebanon, Lesotho, Morocco, and New Hebrides withdrew from the competition after their respective organizations failed to hold a national competition or appoint a delegate.

=== Incidents during the competition ===
Seconds after Sayalero was crowned Miss Universe, the back of the stage collapsed as a throng of journalists and photographers rushed forward to interview or photograph her. Twenty-five people, including ten of the contestants, fell two meters from the catwalk. Dian Borg Bartolo of Malta and Fusin Dermitan of Turkey were taken to Royal Perth Hospital for examination after sustaining minor leg injuries. Sayalero remained unaffected by the commotion while seated on her throne.

== Results ==
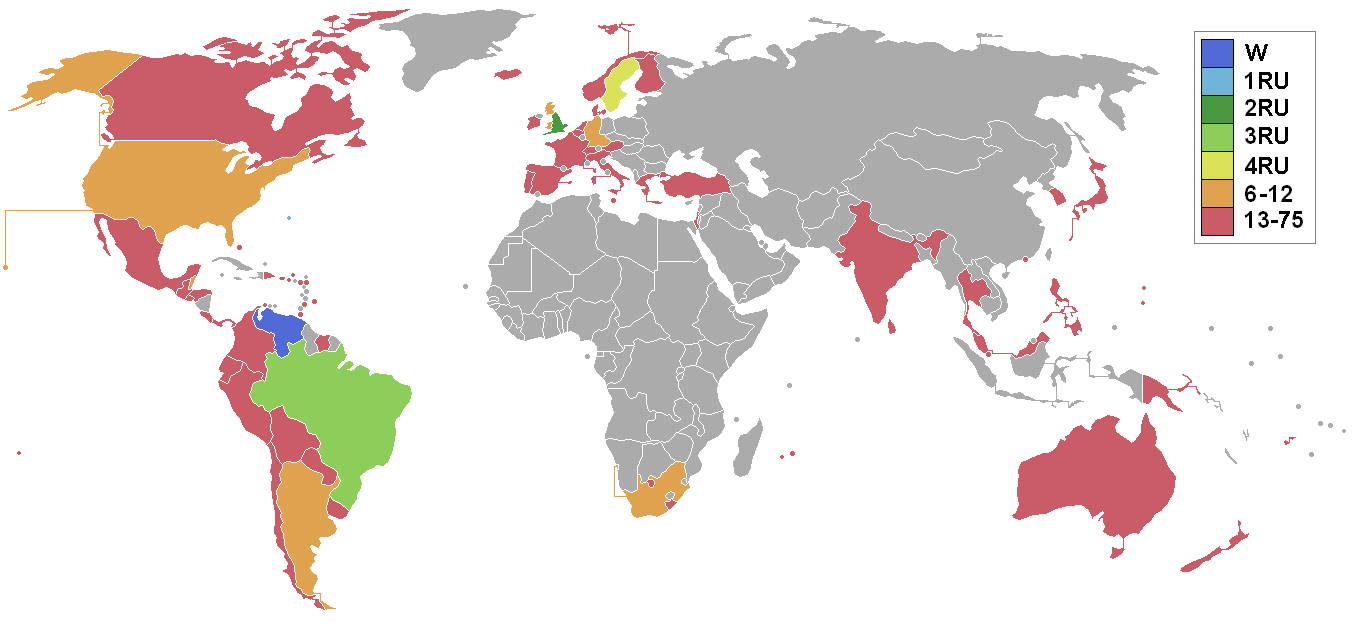
Miss Universe 1979 participating countries and territories

=== Placements ===
Placement	Contestant
Miss Universe 1979	Venezuela – Maritza Sayalero
1st Runner-Up	Bermuda – Gina Swainson
2nd Runner-Up	England – Carolyn Seaward
3rd Runner-Up	Brazil – Martha da Costa
4th Runner-Up	Sweden – Anette Ekström
Top 12	Argentina – Adriana Álvarez; Belize – Sarita Acosta; Scotland – Lorraine Davidson; South Africa – Veronica Wilson; United States – Mary Therese Friel; Wales – Beverly Hobson; West Germany – Andrea Hontschik

==== Final Scores ====
Country/Territory	Interview	Swimsuit	Evening Gown	Average
Venezuela	9.362 (1)	9.135 (1)	9.416 (1)	9.304 (1)
Bermuda	8.872 (2)	9.027 (2)	9.100 (2)	9.000 (2)
England	8.671 (3)	8.591 (4)	8.936 (3)	8.733 (3)
Brazil	8.509 (4)	8.764 (3)	8.818 (4)	8.697 (4)
Sweden	8.300 (5)	8.127 (7)	8.409 (6)	8.279 (5)
South Africa	7.918 (10)	8.330 (5)	8.454 (5)	8.234 (6)
Belize	8.118 (7)	8.279 (6)	8.118 (10)	8.171 (7)
United States	8.100 (8)	7.709 (12)	8.335 (7)	8.048 (8)
Germany	8.125 (6)	7.882 (10)	8.118 (10)	8.042 (9)
Scotland	7.764 (11)	8.118 (8)	8.218 (8)	8.033 (10)
Argentina	8.009 (9)	8.045 (9)	8.021 (12)	8.025 (11)
Wales	7.380 (12)	7.818 (11)	8.150 (9)	7.783 (12)

=== Special awards ===
Award	Contestant
Miss Amity	Japan – Yurika Kuroda
Miss Photogenic	England – Carolyn Seaward

==== Best National Costume ====
Placement	Contestant
Winner	Uruguay – Elizabeth Busti
1st runner-up	Brazil – Martha da Costa
2nd runner-up	South Africa – Veronica Wilson

== Pageant ==
=== Format ===
Same with 1971, twelve semi-finalists were chosen at the preliminary competition that consists of the swimsuit and evening gown competition. The twelve semi-finalists participated in the casual interview, swimsuit, and evening gown competitions. From twelve, five finalists were shortlisted to advance to the final interview.

=== Selection committee ===
- Ita Buttrose – Australian television and radio personality
- Lana Cantrell – Australia singer
- Yves Corbassière – French painter
- Don Galloway – American actor
- Apasra Hongsakula – Miss Universe 1965 from Thailand
- Julio Iglesias – Spanish singer-songwriter
- Tony Martin – American actor and singer
- Robin Moore – American writer
- Rossana Podestà – Italian actress
- Anne Marie Pohtamo – Miss Universe 1975 from Finland
- Constance Towers – American actress

== Contestants ==
Seventy-five contestants competed for the title.

Country/Territory	Contestant	Age (Note: Ages at the time of the pageant)	Hometown
(Antigua and Barbuda) Antigua	Elsie Maynard	19	St. John's
Argentina	Adriana Álvarez	17	Buenos Aires
Aruba	Lugina Vilchez	20	Oranjestad
Australia	Kerrie Dunderdale	20	Sydney
Austria	Karin Zorn	18	Weiz
(The Bahamas) Bahamas	Lolita Ambrister	18	Dundas Town
Barbados	Barbara Bradshaw	19	Saint Michael
Belgium	Christine Cailliau	23	Brussels
(British Honduras) Belize	Sarita Acosta	19	Belize City
Bermuda	Gina Swainson	21	St. George's
Bolivia	María Luisa Rendón	20	Cochabamba
Bophuthatswana	Alina Moeketse	22	Mmabatho
Brazil	Martha da Costa	20	Mossoró
British Virgin Islands	Eartha Ferdinand	19	Road Town
Canada	Heidi Quiring	20	Winnipeg
Chile	Cecilia Serrano	19	Santiago
Colombia	Ana Milena Parra	20	Bucaramanga
Costa Rica	Carla Facio	17	San José
Denmark	Lone Jørgensen	18	Holstebro
Dominican Republic	Elizabeth García	19	Santo Domingo
Ecuador	Margarita Plaza	25	Guayaquil
El Salvador	Ivette López	19	San Salvador
England	Carolyn Seaward	18	Devon
Fiji	Tanya Whiteside	21	Suva
Finland	Päivi Uitto	22	Helsinki
France	Sylvie Paréra	18	Marseille
(France) French Polynesia	Fabienne Tapare	18	Papeete
Greece	Katia Koukidou	22	Athens
Guam	Marie Cruz	18	Agana
Guatemala	Michelle Domínguez	19	Guatemala City
Holland	Eunice Bharatsingh	18	The Hague
Honduras	Gina Weidner	18	San Pedro Sula
(British Hong Kong) Hong Kong	Olivia Chang	19	Hong Kong
Iceland	Halldóra Björk Jónsdóttir	22	Reykjavík
India	Swaroop Sampat	20	Bombay
(Republic of Ireland) Ireland	Lorraine O'Connor	24	Cork
Israel	Vered Polgar	17	Haifa
Italy	Elvira Puglisi	19	Sicily
Japan	Yurika Kuroda	20	Tokyo
Malaysia	Irene Wong	23	Kuala Lumpur
Malta	Dian Borg Bartolo	18	Victoria
Mauritius	Maria Allard	23	Port Louis
Mexico	Blanca Díaz	18	Acaponeta
New Zealand	Andrea Kake	19	Auckland
Northern Mariana Islands	Barbara Torres	18	Saipan
Norway	Unni Øglænd	20	Oslo
Panama	Yahel Dolande	17	Panama City
Papua New Guinea	Molly Misbut	23	Port Moresby
Paraguay	Patricia Lohman	17	Asunción
Peru	Jacqueline Brahm	19	Lima
Philippines	Criselda Cecilio	18	Manila
Portugal	Marta Maria Mendoça de Gouveia	17	Lisbon
Puerto Rico	Teresa López	18	Mayagüez
Réunion	Isabelle Jacquemart	20	Saint-Denis
Saint Christopher-Nevis-Anguilla	Cheryl Chaderton	19	Basseterre
(Saint Vincent and the Grenadines) Saint Vincent	June de Nobriga	23	Kingstown
Scotland	Lorraine Davidson	19	Glasgow
Singapore	Elaine Tan	17	Singapore
South Africa	Veronica Wilson	25	Johannesburg
South Korea	Jae-hwa Seo	20	Seoul
Spain	Gloria Valenciano	18	Santa Cruz de Tenerife
Sri Lanka	Vidyahari Vanigasooriya	20	Colombo
Suriname	Sergine Lieuw-A-Len	17	Paramaribo
Sweden	Annette Ekström	19	Eskilstuna
Switzerland	Birgit Krahl	19	Geneva
Thailand	Wongduan Kerdpoom	17	Bangkok
Transkei	Lindiwe Bam	17	Mthatha
Trinidad and Tobago	Marie Noelle Diaz	20	Port of Spain
Turkey	Fusin Dermitan	21	Ankara
United States	Mary Therese Friel	20	Pittsford
United States Virgin Islands	Linda Torres	23	Saint John
Uruguay	Elizabeth Busti	20	Montevideo
Venezuela	Maritza Sayalero	18	Caracas
Wales	Beverly Hobson	19	Llandudno
West Germany	Andrea Hontschik	19	Berlin
