= Lisa Lents =

Danish celebrity & TV personality (born 1986)

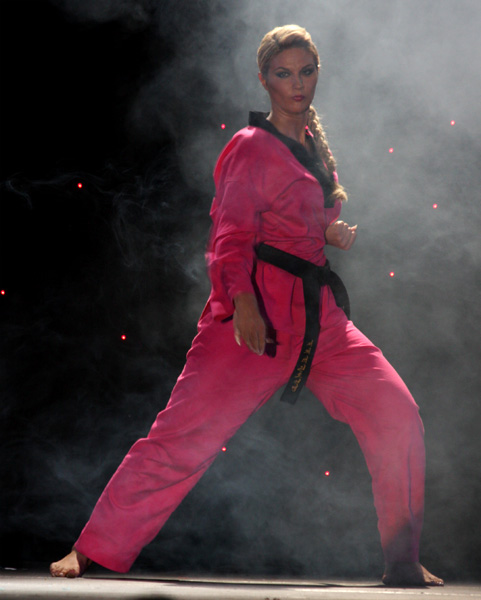
- Born: Lisa Lents; December 15, 1986 (age 39); Minsk, Belarus
- Height: 178 cm (5 ft 10 in)
- Beauty pageant titleholder
- Title: Model, TV host, taekwondo athlete

Lisa Lents (Belarusian: Ліза Ленц; born December 15, 1986) is a Danish-Belarusian actress, TV host, model, taekwondo athlete and beauty pageant titleholder. She was the winner of Miss Denmark 2008 and represented Denmark in Miss World 2008 in South Africa.

In May 2019, P1 Dokumentar's journalists reported that Lisa Lents allegedly used harsh methods towards several of the young girls who are under her wing in the Miss Denmark competition.
