= Christina Mikkelsen =

Danish model (born 1992)

- Born: Christina Mikkelsen; 19 September 1992 (age 34); Copenhagen, Denmark
- Height: 1.76 m (5 ft 9 in)
- Beauty pageant titleholder
- Title: Bride of the World 2012; Miss Universe Denmark 2016
- Hair color: Blonde
- Eye color: Green
- Major competitions: Miss Universe Denmark 2016 (Dethroned); Miss Universe 2016 (Unplaced)

Christina Mikkelsen (born 19 September 1992) is a Danish model and beauty pageant titleholder who won Miss Universe Denmark 2016. She represented Denmark at the Miss Universe 2016 in Manila, Philippines on 30 January 2017, but later was dethroned in February 2017 due to accusations of money laundering in Equatorial Guinea.

== Pageantry ==
On 14 May 2016 Mikkelsen was also crowned Miss Universe Denmark 2016.

Awards and achievements
Preceded by Cecilie Wellemberg	Miss Universe Denmark; 2016	Succeeded by Helena Heuser
