= Gina Swainson =

Bermudian model, Miss World 1979

- Swainson in 1979
- Born: Gina Ann Casandra Swainson; 6 June 1958 (age 68); Bermuda
- Beauty pageant titleholder
- Title: Miss Bermuda 1979; Miss World 1979
- Hair color: Brown
- Eye color: Brown
- Major competitions: Miss Bermuda 1979 (Winner); Miss Universe 1979 (1st runner-up); Miss World 1979 (Winner)

Gina Ann Casandra Swainson (born 6 June 1958) is a Bermudian model and beauty queen who won the Miss World 1979 title and placed as first runner-up at Miss Universe 1979. She later ran her own makeup business

== Miss Universe ==
Prior to competing in Miss World, she participated in Miss Universe and placed first runner-up to Miss Universe 1979, Maritza Sayalero of Venezuela.

== Miss World ==
As the official representative of Bermuda to the 1979 Miss World pageant held in London, United Kingdom on 15 November, she captured the crown of Miss World 1979, becoming the only woman to win a major international pageant for Bermuda as of 2020 and the most successful at both Miss Universe and Miss World.

Upon her return to Bermuda, there was a parade in her honour. Swainson was met at the airport and driven to Hamilton where she was taken around the streets in a horse-drawn carriage. As a tribute to her win, Swainson was depicted on a series of Bermudian postage stamps in 1980, becoming the first living person outside of the Royal Family to be featured on a Bermudan stamp.

After her pageant win, Swainson married the maitre'd of a restaurant in Hamilton. Swainson opened her own cosmetics shop in 1993 after learning about them during Miss World and realising there were not many brands available that catered for black women. In the same year, she provided the makeup for Kellie Hall, Bermuda's 1993 Miss World entrant, and coached her for the contest. Swainson later moved to the United Kingdom with her husband and became a councillor for young people in Surrey.

Awards and achievements
Preceded by (Argentina) Silvana Suárez	Miss World; 1979	Succeeded by (Germany) Gabriella Brum (Resigned) (Guam) Kimberley Santos (Assumed)
