= Miss World 1979 =

29th Miss World pageant

- Gina Swainson
- Date: 15 November 1979
- Presenters: Esther Rantzen; Sacha Distel
- Venue: Royal Albert Hall, London, United Kingdom
- Broadcaster: BBC
- Entrants: 70
- Placements: 15
- Debuts: Lesotho
- Withdrawals: Curaçao; Dominica; Saint Vincent; Tunisia
- Returns: Bolivia; Guatemala; Lebanon; Panama; Portugal
- Winner: Gina Swainson; Bermuda
- Personality: Anne-Marie Franke (Guam)
- Photogenic: Karin Zorn (Austria)

Miss World 1979, the 29th edition of the Miss World pageant, was held on 15 November 1979 at the Royal Albert Hall in London, United Kingdom.

The winner was Gina Swainson from Bermuda. She was crowned by Miss World 1978, Silvana Suarez of Argentina. First runner-up was Carolyn Seaward representing the United Kingdom and second runner-up was Debbie Campbell from Jamaica. Swainson was a first runner-up in Miss Universe 1979, while Seaward was second runner-up in same pageant as the representative of England.

Live television coverage of the contest was largely abandoned by the BBC as a result of a trade union dispute typical of the era in Britain, when sound engineers refused to work, and the BBC decided shortly beforehand that it could not show live pictures without a commentary. The parade of the contestants in their national costumes and each of the entrants in their evening wear had been recorded the night before, so this was televised, followed later in the evening with the crowning of the winner with mute pictures narrated by Ray Moore. A unscheduled repeat of Futtocks End was televised to bridge the two segments. For later overseas transmission, a commentary was added to the silent pictures of the entire event, but the interviews with the final 7 contestants were never shown.

This edition marked the debut of Lesotho. And the return of Portugal, which last competed in 1973, Guatemala last competed in 1976 and Bolivia, Lebanon and Panama last competed in 1977. Curaçao, Dominica, Saint Vincent, Tunisia, withdrew from the competition for unknown reasons.

== Results ==
=== Placements ===
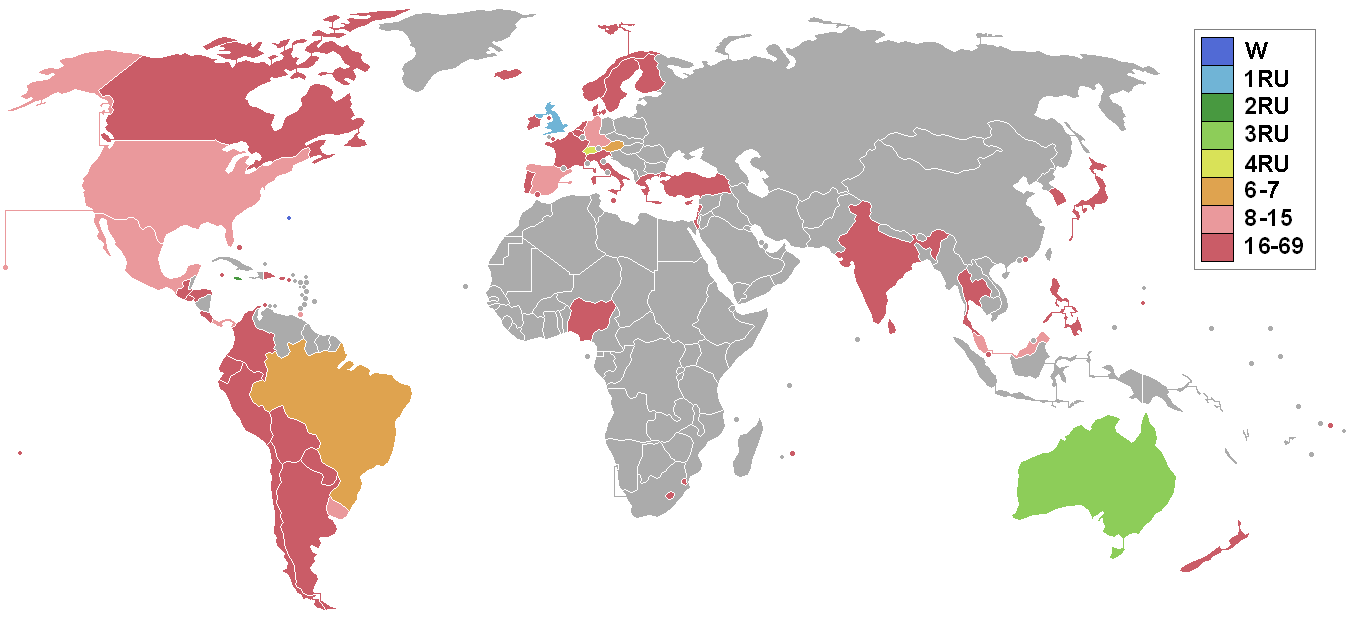
Countries and territories which sent delegates and results for Miss World 1979

Placement	Contestant
Miss World 1979	Bermuda – Gina Swainson
1st Runner-Up	United Kingdom – Carolyn Seaward
2nd Runner-Up	Jamaica – Debbie Campbell
3rd Runner-Up	Australia – Jodie Anne Day
4th Runner-Up	Switzerland – Barbara Meyer
Top 7	Austria – Karin Zorn; Brazil – Lea Silvia Dall'acqua
Top 15	Malaysia – Shirley Chew; Mexico – Roselina Rosas Torres; Panama – Lorelay de la Ossa; Spain – María Dolores Forner Toro; Trinidad and Tobago – Marlene Coggins; United States – Carter Wilson; Uruguay – Laura Rodríguez Delgado; West Germany – Andrea Hontschik

== Contestants ==
Country	Contestant	Age	Hometown
Argentina	Verónica Ivonne Gargani	19	Buenos Aires
Aruba	Vianca van Hoek	20	Oranjestad
Australia	Jodie Anne Day	18	Brisbane
Austria	Karin Zorn	18	Weiz
(The Bahamas) Bahamas	Deborah Major	20	Nassau
Belgium	Christine Cailliau	23	Brussels
Bermuda	Gina Swainson	21	St. George's Parish
Bolivia	Patricia Asbún	20	Santa Cruz de la Sierra
Brazil	Léa Sílvia dall’Acqua	20	Campinas
Canada	Catherine Mackintosh	23	Thunder Bay
Cayman Islands	Jennifer Jackson	21	George Town
Chile	Marianela Toledo	19	Santiago
Colombia	Rosaura Rodríguez	17	Cartagena
Costa Rica	Marianela Brealey	17	San José
Cyprus	Eliana Djiaboura	24	Nicosia
Denmark	Lone Jörgensen	18	Holstebro
Dominican Republic	Sabrina Brugal	18	Santo Domingo
Ecuador	Olba Padilla	18	Guayaquil
El Salvador	Ivette Lopez	19	San Salvador
Finland	Tuire Pentikäinen	23	Helsinki
France	Sylvie Parera	18	Marseille
French Polynesia (Note: Competed as Tahiti in the pageant)	Thilda Fuller	24	Pape'ete
Gibraltar	Audrey Lopez	21	Gibraltar
Greece	Mika Dimitropoulou	17	Athens
Guam	Anne-Marie Franke	18	Hagatna
Guatemala	Michele Domínguez	19	Guatemala City
(Netherlands) Holland	Nannetje Nielen	22	Amsterdam
Honduras	Gina Maria Weidner	18	San Pedro Sula
(British Hong Kong) Hong Kong	Mary Ng	21	Kowloon Bay
Iceland	Sigrún Sætran	24	Reykjavík
India	Raina Mendonica	22	Bombay
(Republic of Ireland) Ireland	Maura McMenamim	21	Dublin
Isle of Man	Kathleen Mary Craig	17	Douglas
Israel	Dana Feller	19	Tel Aviv
Italy	Rossana Serratore	18	Asti
Jamaica	Debbie Campbell	17	Kingston
Japan	Motomi Hibino	19	Nagoya
Jersey	Treena Foster	21	Saint Helier
Lebanon	Jacqueline Riachi	19	Beirut
Lesotho	Pauline Essie Kanedi	22	Maseru
Malaysia	Shirley Chew	18	Kangar
Malta	Elena Christine Abela	17	Sliema
Mauritius	Maria Allard	24	Port Louis
Mexico	Roselina Rosas Torres	19	Durango City
New Zealand	Nikki Duckworth	17	Hamilton
Nigeria	Helen Prest	20	Ibadan
Norway	Jeanette Aarum	20	Fredrikstad
Panama	Lorelay de la Ossa	19	Panama City
Paraguay	Martha Galli	19	Asunción
Peru	Magali Pérez-Godoy	18	Lima
Philippines	Josefina Francisco	18	Manila
Portugal	Ana Gonçalves Vieira	18	Lisbon
Puerto Rico	Daisy López	18	San Juan
Singapore	Violet Lee	20	Singapore
South Korea (Note: Competed as Korea in the pageant)	Hong Yeo-jin	21	Seoul
Spain	Dolores Forner	19	Madrid
Sri Lanka	Shamila Weerasooriya	17	Colombo
(Eswatini) Swaziland	Gladys Carmichael	17	Manzini
Sweden	Ing-Marie Säveby	19	Stockholm
Switzerland	Barbara Mayer	21	Marly
Thailand	Tipar Suparbpun	22	Bangkok
Trinidad and Tobago	Marlene Coggins	21	San Fernando
Turkey	Şebnem Ünal	18	Istanbul
United Kingdom	Carolyn Seaward	20	Yelverton
United States	Carter Wilson	23	Harrisonburg
United States Virgin Islands	Jasmine Olivia Turner	17	Saint Croix
Uruguay	Laura Rodríguez	21	Montevideo
Venezuela	Tatiana Capote	18	Barinas
West Germany	Andrea Hontschik	20	Berlin
Western Samoa	Danira Schwalger	19	Apia
