= Yves Corbassière =

French painter (1925–2020)

- Born: 16 May 1925; Paris, France
- Died: 27 April 2020 (aged 94); Poissy, France
- Occupation: Artist

Yves Corbassière (16 May 1925 – 27 April 2020) was a French painter, sculptor, engraver, and lithographer.

== Biography ==
Corbassière was born on 16 May 1925 in Montmartre into a family of industrialists. He had two sisters. His grandfather, Auguste-Joseph Corbassière, founded an earthenware company. Yves' father, Pierre Corbassière, expanded the business. It has two factories: one in Sarreguemines and one on Rue de la Chapelle in Paris.

Corbassière was close to the pianist Boris Vian in his childhood. He obtained images from the photographer Robert Doisneau, including posters and postcards that showed him behind the wheel of his Renault 6CV.

Best known in the United States, Corbassière's works appear in more than 40 American museums. He created more than 5000 works in total.

Yves Corbassière died on 27 April 2020 in Poissy at the age of 94.
