= Maritza Sayalero =

Venezuelan beauty pageant titleholder

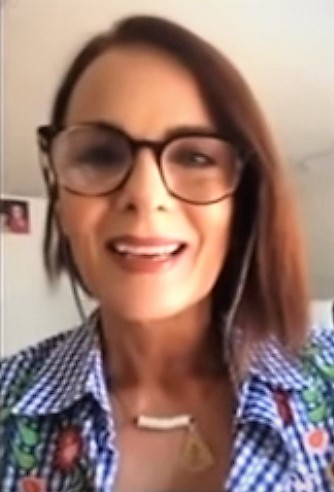
- Sayalero in 2020
- Born: Maritza Sayalero Fernández; 16 February 1961 (age 65); Caracas, Venezuela
- Height: 5 ft 8 in (173 cm)
- Beauty pageant titleholder
- Title: Miss Venezuela 1979; Miss Universe 1979
- Hair color: Light brown
- Eye color: Hazel
- Major competitions: Miss Venezuela 1979 (Winner); Miss Universe 1979 (Winner)

Maritza Sayalero Fernández (born February 16, 1961) is a Venezuelan beauty pageant titleholder. In 1979, she was crowned both Miss Venezuela and Miss Universe, the first woman from Venezuela to win this title.

== Miss Venezuela 1979 ==
Sayalero won Miss Venezuela 1979, representing Miss Departamento Vargas, and the right to represent her country in Miss Universe 1979.

== Miss Universe ==
Sayalero won Miss Universe 1979, held in Perth, Australia on July 19. She was the first titleholder from Venezuela.

Awards and achievements
| Preceded by (South Africa) Margaret Gardiner | Miss Universe; 1979 | Succeeded by (United States) Shawn Weatherly |
| Preceded by Marisol Alfonzo | Miss Venezuela; 1979 | Succeeded by Maye Brandt |
| Preceded by Rita Briceño | Miss Departamento Vargas; 1979 | Succeeded by Hilda Abrahamz |
