= Miss Denmark =

Danish national beauty pageant

Miss Denmark Organization
- Formation: 1926
- Headquarters: Copenhagen
- Location: Denmark
- Official language: Danish
- National Director: Lisa Lents
- Affiliations: Miss World; Miss International; Miss Supranational; Miss Grand International; Miss Earth; Miss Cosmo
- Website: www.missdanmark.dk

Miss Denmark (Danish: Miss Danmark, lit. 'Frøken Danmark') is a national beauty pageant in Denmark. The pageant was founded in 1926, and the winners are sent to Miss World and other titleholders to Miss International, Miss Supranational, Miss Grand International, Miss Earth and Miss Cosmo.

== Organization ==
The Miss Danmark pageant was established in 1926 when the country hosted its first national beauty contest, whose winner was Edith Jørgensen. Between 1951 and 2003, Miss Denmark/Frøken Danmark selected one winner to represent Denmark at several major international beauty competitions. Among the famous Miss Danmarks include Aino Korva, Miss Danmark 1963.

From 1986 until 2013, Memborg models operated the contest. In 2015, the rights to hold Miss Denmark were purchased by Miss World Denmark 2008 Lisa Lents of Miss & Mister Denmark Org. From 2015, the winner of Miss Denmark only competes at Miss World.

In 2013, the organization obtained the Miss Earth franchise license where they sent representatives in 2013 and 2014. After a few years break, they were back at working with Miss Earth in 2017 and 2018.

In 2018, the organization obtained the Miss Universe, Miss International, Miss Grand International and Miss Supranational franchise licenses.

=== Miss Universe Denmark ===
Between 1986 and 1995 Bo Andersen handled the Miss Universe Denmark franchise. From 1996 until 2013, Memborg Models with Lene Memborg operated the franchise. Starting in 2018, Lisa Lents took over the Miss Universe Denmark franchise. The winner of Miss Universe Denmark independent competition was held for the first time in 2019. In 2018 the Miss World Denmark 2016, Helena Heuser won the pageant.

At Miss Universe 2024, Victoria Kjær Theilvig became the first Danish woman to win the Miss Universe title.

=== Former winners ===
Supermodel Helena Christensen began her career in 1986 as Miss Universe Denmark. In the same year, Pia Rosenberg Larsen won Miss Denmark and competed at Miss International, where she placed as first runner-up. In 1993, T.V. personality and actress Maria Hirse won Miss Universe Denmark, but like Helena Christensen, was unplaced at Miss Universe.

== Titleholders ==
Winning International Title
Miss Universe Denmark
Miss World Denmark

Year	Miss Denmark
1926	Edith Jørgensen
1929	Vibeke Mogensen
1930	Esther Petersen
1931	Inga Arvad
1932	Åse Clausen
1933	Karen Marie Løwert
1934	Ethel Louis
1935	Ellen Ørregård
1937	Tove Arni
1938	Inger Eriksen
1952	Hanna Sørensen
1953	Jytte Olsen
1958	Evy Norlund
1959	Lys Stolberg
1960	Lizzie Hess
1961	Jette Nielsen
1963	Aino Korva
1964	Yvonne Mortensen
1965	Jeanette Christiansen
1966	Gitte Fleinert
1967	Margrethe Rhein-Knudsen
1968	Gitte Broge
1969	Jeanne Perfeldt
1970	Winnie Hollman
1972	Marianne Schmit
1974	Jane Møller
1975	Beriti Frederiksen
1976	Brigitte Trolle
1977	Inge Eline Erlandsen
1978	Anita Heske
1979	Lone Gladys Jørgensen
1980	Jane Bill
1981	Tina Brandstrup
1982	Tina Marie Nielsen
1983	Inge Ravn Thomsen
1984	Katrina Clausen
1985	Susan Rasmussen
1986	Pia Rosenberg Larsen
1986	Helena Christensen; Miss Universe Danmark (Separate pageant)
1987	Nana Louise Wildfang Jørgensen
1988	Pernille Nathansen
1989	Louise Mejhede
1990	Maj Britt Jensen
1992	Anne Mette Voss
1993	Maria Josephine Hirse
1994	Gitte Andersen
1995	Tina Dam
1996	Anette Oldenborg
1999	Zahide Bayram
2000	Cecilie Elisa Dahlstrøm
2000	Heidi Meyer Vallentin
2001	Maj Petersen
2002	Masja Juel
2004	Tina Christensen
2005	Gitte Hanspal
2006	Betina Faurbye
2007	Žaklina Šojić
2008	Marie Sten-Knudsen
2010	Ena Sandra Causevic
2011	Sandra Amer Hamad
2012	Josefine Hewitt
2013	Cecilia Iftikhar
2015	Jessica Hvirvelkær
2016	Helena Heuser
2017	Amanda Petri
2018	Louise Sander Henriksen; Dethroned
2018	Tara Jensen
2019	Katja Stokholm
2021	Johanne Grundt Hansen
2022	Malou Posberg Peters
2023	Nikoline Hansen
2024	Emma Heyst
2025	Josephine Bøttger
2026	Simone Julie Lythje

== Titleholders under Miss Denmark ==
=== Miss World Denmark ===
- : Declared as Winner
- : Ended as runner-up or top 5/6 qualification
- : Ended as one of the finalists or semifinalists
- : Ended as special awards winner

Year	Municipality	Miss Danmark	Placement at MW	Special awards	Notes
Lisa Lents directorship — a franchise holder to Miss World from 2009
2026	Hillerød	Josephine Bøttger	Unplaced		
2025	Copenhagen	Emma Heyst	Unplaced		
Miss World 2023 was rescheduled to 2024 due to the change of host and when entering India as the new host, there were several issues that caused the postponement until March 2024.
2023	Kalundborg	Johanne Grundt Hansen	Unplaced		
2022	Miss World 2021 was rescheduled to 16 March 2022 due to the COVID-19 pandemic outbreak in Puerto Rico, no edition started in 2022				
2021	Did not compete				
2020	Due to the impact of COVID-19 pandemic, no pageant in 2020				
2019	Copenhagen	Natasja Kunde	Top 40	Best Talent (Top 27); Top Model (Top 40)	
2018	Hvidovre	Tara Jensen	Unplaced		
2017	Copenhagen	Amanda Petri	Unplaced	Best Talent (Top 20)	
2016	Copenhagen	Helena Heuser	Unplaced	Miss Sport (Top 27)	
2015	Aarhus	Jessica Hvirvelkær	Unplaced		In 2015 Lisa Lents acquisitioned the brand or Miss Danmark in Copenhagen, Denmark. Jessica was the 1st winner to compete at Miss World competition.
Lisa Lents directorship "Miss World Denmark Organization" — a franchise holder to Miss World from 2009
2014	Aalborg	Pernille Sørensen	Unplaced		
2013	Haderslev	Malene Riis Sorensen	Unplaced		
2012	Copenhagen	Iris Thomsen	Top 30	Best Talent (Top 16)	
2011	Kolding	Maya Olesen	Unplaced		
2010	Roskilde	Nataliya Averina	Unplaced		
2009	Copenhagen	Nadia Ulbjerg Pedersen	Unplaced		
2008	Copenhagen	Lisa Lents	Unplaced		
2007	—	Line Kruuse	Unplaced		
2006	—	Sandra Spohr	Unplaced		
2005	—	Trine Lundgaard Nielsen	Unplaced		
2004	—	Line Solling Larsen	Unplaced		
Miss World Denmark (Another agency in Denmark) directorship — a franchise holder to Miss World between 2000 and 2003
2003	—	Maj Buchholtz Pedersen	Unplaced		
Did not compete between 2001 and 2002
2000	—	Anne Katrin Vrang	Unplaced		
A Danish Beauty Committee directorship — a franchise holder to Miss World between 1963―1995
Did not compete between 1996 and 1999
1995	—	Tine Bay	Unplaced		
1994	—	Sara Maria Wolf	Unplaced		
1993	—	Charlotte Als	Unplaced		
1992	—	Anja Hende Brond	Top 10		
1991	—	Sharon Givskav	Unplaced		
1990	—	Charlotte Christiansen	Unplaced		
1989	—	Charlotte Pedersen	Unplaced		
1988	—	Susanne Johansen	Unplaced		
1987	—	Zelma Hesselmann	Unplaced		
1986	Copenhagen	Pia Rosenberg Larsen	1st Runner-up		
1985	—	Jeanette Kroll	Unplaced		
1984	—	Pia Melchioren	Unplaced		
1983	Copenhagen	Tina-Lissette Dahl Joergensen	Unplaced		
1982	Copenhagen	Tina Maria Nielsen	Top 15		
1981	Copenhagen	Tina Brandstrup	Unplaced		
1980	Copenhagen	Jane Bill	Unplaced		
1979	Odense	Lone Jørgensen	Unplaced		
1978	—	Birgit Stefansen	Unplaced		
1977	—	Annette Dybdal Simonsen	Top 15		
1976	—	Susanne Juul Hansen	Unplaced		
1975	—	Pia Isa Lauridsen	Unplaced		
1974	—	Jane Moller	Unplaced		
Did not compete between 1971 and 1973
1970	Copenhagen	Winnie Hollman	Unplaced		
1969	Copenhagen	Jeanne Perfeldt	Unplaced		
1968	—	Yet Schaufuss	Unplaced		
1967	—	Sonja Jensen	Unplaced		
1966	—	Irene Poller Hansen	Unplaced		
1965	—	Yvonne Ekman	Top 15		
1964	Copenhagen	Yvonne Mortensen	Top 15		
1963	Copenhagen	Aino Korva	3rd Runner-up		

=== Miss International Denmark ===
- : Declared as Winner
- : Ended as runner-up or top 5/6 qualification
- : Ended as one of the finalists or semifinalists
- : Ended as special awards winner

Miss International Denmark returned to Miss Danmark Organization in 2018. Prior to 2018 a Miss International Denmark awarded from National local selection for Miss International. Between 1960 and 1995 Miss Danmark sent delegate to the pageant. In 1986 Miss Denmark 1985, Pia Rosenberg Larsen placed 1st Runner-up and that year is the highest achievement for Denmark in Miss International history.

Year	Municipality	Miss International Danmark	Placement at Miss International	Special Awards	Notes
2025	Copenhagen	Asta Klæstrup Nielsen	Unplaced		
2024	Did not compete				
2023	Copenhagen	Julie Brink	Unplaced		
2022	Copenhagen	Dana Myrvig	Unplaced		
Due to the impact of COVID-19 pandemic, no competition held between 2020—2021
2019	Frederiksberg	Anna Diekelmann	Unplaced		
2018	Frederiksberg	Louise Arildn	Unplaced		Lisa Lents directorship (Miss Danmark Organization).

=== Miss Supranational Denmark ===
- : Declared as Winner
- : Ended as runner-up or top 5/6 qualification
- : Ended as one of the finalists or semifinalists
- : Ended as special awards winner

Year	Municipality	Miss Supranational Danmark	Placement at Miss Supranational	Special Awards	Notes
2025	Hillerød	Sofie Ørn Andersen	Unplaced		
2024	Rosklide	Victoria Larsen	Top 12	Miss Supranational 2024 Europe; Winner - Supra Fan Vote; Top 7 Miss Talent; Top 5 Miss Innfluencer Opportunity	
2023	Did not compete				
2022	Næstved	Johanne Grundt Hansen	Unplaced	Miss Supra Influencer (Top 15)	
2021	Did not compete				
2020	Due to the impact of COVID-19 pandemic, no pageant in 2020				
2019	Faroe Islands	Monika Midjord Nolsøe	Did not compete		
2018	Copenhagen	Celina Riel	Top 25		

=== Miss Grand Denmark ===
- : Declared as Winner
- : Ended as runner-up or top 5/6 qualification
- : Ended as one of the finalists or semifinalists
- : Ended as special awards winner

Year	Municipality	Miss Grand Danmark	Placement at Miss Grand International	Special Awards	Notes
2025	Odense	Emilie Lærkegaard-Andersen	Unplaced		
2024	Danish Community in Thailand	Cecilia Presmann	Unplaced		
2023	Næstved	Sille Albertsen	Unplaced		
2022	Gribskov	Victoria Kjaer Theilvig	Top 20		
Did not compete between 2019—2021
2018	Copenhagen	Natasja Kunde	Unplaced		

=== Miss Cosmo Denmark ===
- : Declared as Winner
- : Finished as a runner-up or top 5/6 qualification
- : Finished as one of the finalists or semifinalists
- : Finished as a special awards winner

Year	Municipality	Miss Cosmo Danmark	Placement at Miss Cosmo	Special Awards	Notes
2025	Aarhus	Clara Rønneholt	TBA	TBA	

== Past Miss Denmark titleholders ==
=== Miss Universe Denmark ===
- : Declared the Winner
- : Finished as a runner-up or top 5/6 qualification
- : Finished as one of the finalists or semifinalists
- : Finished as aspecial awards winner

Denmark set to be at Miss Universe in 1952 under Miss Danmark Organization. In 1985 there was a special edition of Miss Universe Denmark. Began 1986 the main winners competed at Miss Universe again. Between 2015 and 2016 the Face of Denmark Org. selected the winners to Miss Universe. Between 2018 and 2024, the Miss Danmark by Lisa Lents sets a return to Denmark at Miss Universe. Since 2025, Miss Universe Denmark was hold by Josh Yugen. Denmark did not compete at Miss Universe in the following years: 1954–57, 1962, 1971, 1974, 1991, 1997–99, 2001–2003, 2009, 2014, and 2017.

Year	Municipality	Miss Danmark	Placement at MU	Special awards	Notes
Miss Universe Denmark by Josh Yugen directorship — a franchise holder to Miss Universe since 2025
2025	Copenhagen	Monique Sonne	Unplaced		Appointed
Lisa Lents directorship — a franchise holder to Miss Universe between 2018-2024
2024	Gribskov	Victoria Kjær Theilvig	Miss Universe 2024		Appointed ― Victoria was appointed by Miss Danmark Org. after the main winner allocated to Miss World 2025.
2023	Valby	Nikoline Hansen	Unplaced		
2022	Næstved	Malou Peters	Did not compete		
2021	Copenhagen	Sara Langtved	Unplaced		Appointed — Due to the impact of COVID-19 pandemic, the Miss Earth Denmark 2019 crowned as the Miss Universe Denmark 2021.
2020	Copenhagen	Amanda Petri	Unplaced		Appointed — Due to the impact of COVID-19 pandemic, the Miss World Denmark 2017 crowned as the Miss Universe Denmark 2020.
2019	Odense	Katja Stokholm	Unplaced		
2018	Copenhagen	Helena Heuser	Unplaced		
Face of Denmark by Anders Hamilton de Voss and John Hamilton directorship — a franchise holder to Miss Universe between 2015―2016
Did not compete in 2017
2016	Copenhagen	Christina Mikkelsen	Unplaced		
2015	Hørsholm	Cecilie Wellemberg	Unplaced		
Miss Danmark Organization by Pretty Danish (Memborg Models) directorship — a franchise holder to Miss Universe between 2004―2013
Did not compete in 2014
2013	Copenhagen	Cecilia Iftikhar	Unplaced		
2012	Copenhagen	Josefine Hewitt	Unplaced		
2011	Copenhagen	Sandra Amer Hamad	Unplaced		The first Miss Danmark who has Danish–Iraqi multicultural heritage.
2010	Sønderborg	Ena Sandra Causevic	Unplaced		
Did not compete in 2009
2008	Copenhagen	Marie Sten-Knudsen	Unplaced		
2007	Copenhagen	Žaklina Šojić	Top 15		
2006	Copenhagen	Betina Faurbye	Top 20		
2005	Roskilde	Gitte Hanspal	Unplaced		
2004	Copenhagen	Tina Christensen	Unplaced		
A Danish Beauty Committee "Miss Danmark" directorship — a franchise holder to Miss Universe between 1952―2000
Did not compete between 2001—2003
2000	Copenhagen	Heidi Meyer Vallentin	Unplaced		Officially Miss Danmark 2000, Cecilie Elisa Dahlstrøm did not compete at Miss Universe; Heidi Meyer won the Miss Universe Danmark competition from Memborg models.
Did not compete between 1997—1999
1996	Copenhagen	Anette Oldenborg	Unplaced		
1995	Aalborg	Tina Dam	Unplaced		
1994	Copenhagen	Gitte Andersen	Unplaced		
1993	Copenhagen	Maria Josephine Hirse	Unplaced		
1992	Copenhagen	Anne Mette Voss	Unplaced		
Did not compete in 1991
1990	Copenhagen	Maj-Britt Jensen	Unplaced		
1989	Copenhagen	Louise Mejlhede	Unplaced		
1988	Favrskov	Pernille Nathansen	Unplaced		
1987	Sønderborg	Nanna-Louise Johansen	Unplaced	Best Swimsuit (60th)	
1986	Copenhagen	Helena Christensen	Unplaced	Best Swimsuit (33rd)	Miss Universe Danmark 1986; Bon andersen held the separation of Miss Universe Denmark competition, the Miss Danmark 1986 was Pia Rosenberg who allocated to Miss World 1986.
1985	Copenhagen	Susan Boje Rasmussen	Unplaced		
1984	Copenhagen	Catharina Clausen	Unplaced	Best Swimsuit (21st)	
1983	Copenhagen	Inge Ravn Thomsen	Unplaced	Best Swimsuit (5th)	
1982	Copenhagen	Tina Maria Nielsen	Unplaced	Best Swimsuit (31st)	
1981	Copenhagen	Tina Brandstrup	Unplaced	Miss Photogenic	
1980	Copenhagen	Jane Bill	Unplaced	Best Swimsuit (21st)	
1979	Odense	Lone Jørgensen	Unplaced	Best Swimsuit (26th)	
1978	Copenhagen	Anita Heske	Unplaced		
1977	Copenhagen	Inge Eline Erlandsen	Unplaced		
1976	Copenhagen	Brigitte Trolle	Unplaced		
1975	Stevns	Berit Frederiksen	Unplaced		
1974	Copenhagen	Jane Møller	Did not compete		
1973	Copenhagen	Anette Grankvist	Unplaced		Designated as Miss Universe Denmark 1973 after Miss Danmark pageant postponed.
1972	Copenhagen	Marianne Schmidt	Unplaced		
Did not compete in 1971
1970	Copenhagen	Winnie Hollmann	Unplaced		
1969	Copenhagen	Jeanne Perfeldt	Unplaced		
1968	Copenhagen	Gitte Broge	Unplaced		
1967	Copenhagen	Margrethe Rhein-Knudsen	Top 15		
1966	Copenhagen	Gitte Fleinert	Top 15		
1965	Copenhagen	Jeannette Christjansen	Top 15		
1964	Copenhagen	Yvonne Mortensen	Unplaced		
1963	Copenhagen	Aino Korva	1st Runner-up		
Did not compete in 1962
1961	Copenhagen	Jyette Nielsen	Unplaced		
1960	Copenhagen	Lizzie Ellinor Hess	Unplaced		
1959	Copenhagen	Lisa Stolberg	Unplaced		
1958	Copenhagen	Evy Norlund	Top 15		
Did not compete between 1954—1957
1953	Copenhagen	Jytte Olsen	Top 15		
1952	Copenhagen	Hanne Sørensen	Unplaced		

== See also ==
- Mister Denmark
