= List of museums in Chile =

This is a list of museums in Chile.

== List ==
- Chilean National Museum of Fine Arts
- Museum of Memory and Human Rights
- Historical Museum and Cultural Center of the Carabineros de Chile
- Centro Cultural Palacio de La Moneda
- Archaeological Museum of La Serena
- Anthropological Museum R. P. Sebastián Englert
- Museo Nacional Aeronáutico y del Espacio
- Palacio Cousiño
- Museo Arqueológico de Santiago
- Museo Campesino de Colima
- Museo de Santiago
- Museo Catedral Metropolitana
- Museo Colonial San Francisco
- Museo Chileno de Arte Precolombino, Santiago
- Chilean National History Museum
- Museo de Arte Contemporáneo Valdivia
- Museo de Arte Contemporáneo (Santiago, Chile)
- Museo Artequin Museo Artequín
- Museo de Ciencia y Tecnología
- Museo Ferroviario
- Museo de la Solidaridad Salvador Allende
- Museo Interactivo Mirador
- Museo Mapuche
- Chilean National Museum of Natural History
- Museo Nao Victoria
- Museo Regional de la Araucanía
- La Chascona, Pablo Neruda's house, now a museum
- Museo La Sebastiana (Casa Pablo Neruda)
- Casa de Isla Negra, Isla Negra
- Museo Fuerte Niebla
- Museo de la Exploración Rudolph Amandus Philippi
- Museo Histórico y Antropológico Maurice van de Maele
- Open Air Museum Viña del Mar
- R. P. Gustavo Le Paige Archaeological Museum
- Martin Gusinde Anthropological Museum
- Palacio Baburizza

== See also ==
- List of museums by country
