= Juan Salazar =

Juan Salazar may refer to:

- Juan Francisco Salazar, Chilean anthropologist and filmmaker
- Juan Carlos Salazar (musician), Venezuelan singer and cuatro player
- Juan Carlos Salazar Gómez, secretary-general of the International Civil Aviation Organization
- Juan Camilo Salazar (footballer, born 1997), Colombian defender
- Juan Camilo Salazar (footballer, born 1998), Colombian forward
- Juan José Salazar, Colombian musician, sound engineer and music producer
