= Austral University of Chile =

Research university in Chile

- Universidad Austral de Chile
- Motto: Libertas Capitur
- Type: Traditional
- Established: September 7, 1954
- Rector: Egon Montecinos
- Administrative staff: 776
- Students: 17,411 (2020)
- Undergraduates: 16,931
- Postgraduates: 480
- Location: Avenue Independencia #641, Valdivia, Los Ríos Region, Chile; 39.8073°S 73.2511°W
- Website: www.uach.cl

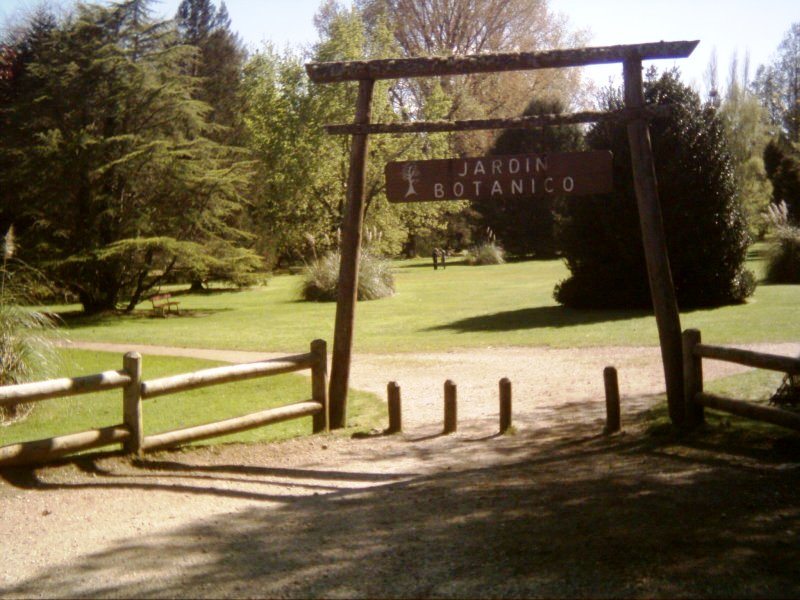
Entrance to Austral University of Chile's botanical garden

Austral University of Chile (Spanish: Universidad Austral de Chile or UACh) is a Chilean research university based primarily in Valdivia, with satellite campuses in Puerto Montt and Coyhaique. Founded on September 7, 1954, it is one of the eight original Chilean Traditional Universities. It operates as a nonprofit self-owned corporation under private law, and receives significant state-funding.

== History ==
=== Foundation and early years (1942–1968) ===
In 1942, the Sociedad de Amigos del Arte (Society of friends of art) was formed in the city of Valdivia. Aside from promoting culture, one of the society's main goals was to establish a university in the city. The idea of creating a university was presented to the national congress in the 1950s by the senator for Valdivia, Carlos Acharán Pérez de Arce, who later succeeded in consolidating the project. In a meeting held on 16 February 1954 supporters of installing a university created a directory and proclaimed Eduardo Morales Miranda as president of it. The initial founding depended on donations from private persons including some industrial businessmen. After have been founded by decree on 7 September 1954 the university was inaugurated on 12 March 1955 by president Carlos Ibáñez del Campo. The inauguration was also attended by the rectors of the University of Chile and the States Technical University as well as the ambassadors of Venezuela and Argentina and representatives of the Netherlands, Germany and the United States.

The first degree programmes to be taught at the university were fine arts, agronomy, forestry engineering and veterinary medicine, each of which had also its own faculty.

On June 3 of 1968 UACh was granted autonomy from the University of Chile as law 16.848 was enacted. The autonomy did that UACh became allowed to decide its own plans and study programs and put the university out of the tutelage of the University of Chile.

=== Development (1969–1999) ===
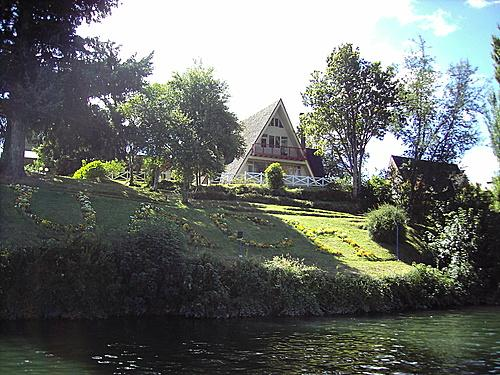
Picture of one of the "A"-houses of Universidad Austral near Valdivia River in Isla Teja Campus

During the military regime's privatization of higher education in the 1980s UACh incorporated the successor regional see of Universidad Técnica del Estado, the Instituto Profesional de Valdivia. By doing this, UACh prevented an offshoot university from being created there as it happened around the country with regional sees of major universities. With the incorporation of Instituto Profesional de Valdivia, that corresponds to present day 'Campus Miraflores, UACh started to grant bachelor degrees in engineering and got its Engineering Faculty.

In 1993, the university held the Valdivia International Film Festival for the first time to celebrate the 30th anniversary of its cinema Cine Club which has since then developed to one of the most important film festivals in Chile.

=== Recent history (2000–present) ===
With the arrival of Centro de Estudios Científicos (CECS) to Valdivia in 2000 the city was further outlined as a research center, as CECS brought expertise on biophysics, molecular physiology, theoretical physics, glaciology and climate change to the city. The arrival of CECS was seen as positive by UACh's administration since CECS research do not overlap UACh's main research areas and, as a scientific research corporation, do not compete in student enrollment. However, in 2007 UACh and CECS got involved in a controversy when the Regional Council of Los Lagos Region granted regional funds that had been put into tender to CECS without attending to the meeting where UACh's and University of Los Lagos joint project was presented. Deputy Gabriel Ascencio (DC) accused Claudio Bunster, director of CECS, of using his personal influence among politicians and the Council of Innovation for Competitiveness (of which he is member of) to gain more resources.

On Monday 3 December 2007 the Emilio Pugín building of the Faculty of Sciences caught fire. The building, located on Teja island Campus housed considerable amounts of chemicals and scientific equipment which could not be saved. Several research projects had to be halted or aborted due to loss of equipment, samples and data. Due to the spreading of toxic smoke the police had to evacuate a total of 10,000 people from Isla Teja. Firefighting companies from the neighboring cities of Osorno, La Unión and Paillaco had to come to assist to control and extinguish the fire. The building hosted the institutes of chemistry, physics, zoology, microbiology and botanics, including some laboratories. The cost of the damage was estimated at 5000 million Chilean pesos (about 10 million US dollars). Finally, 22% of the damage were not covered by the according insurances, but directly financed by the Chilean government.

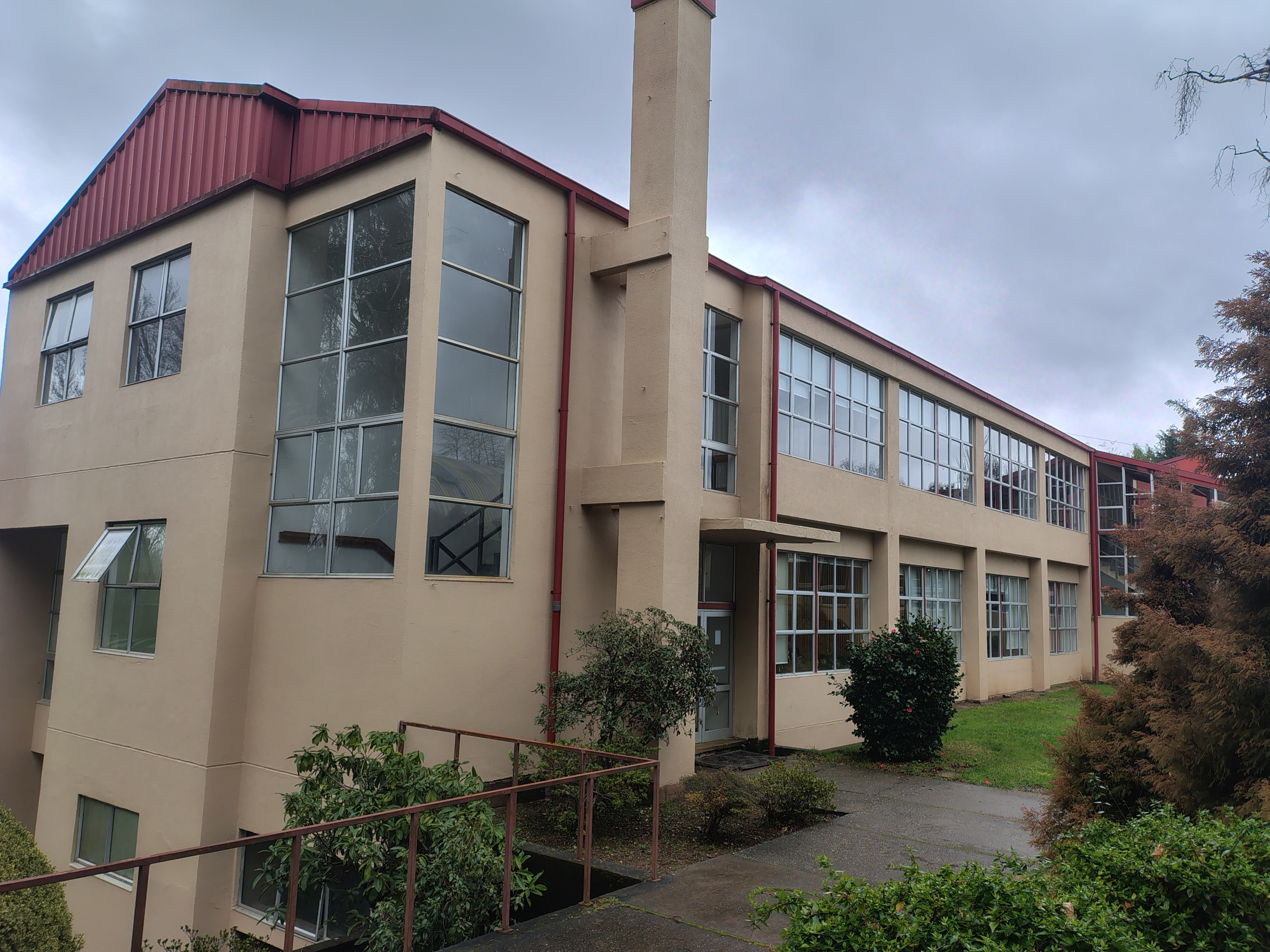
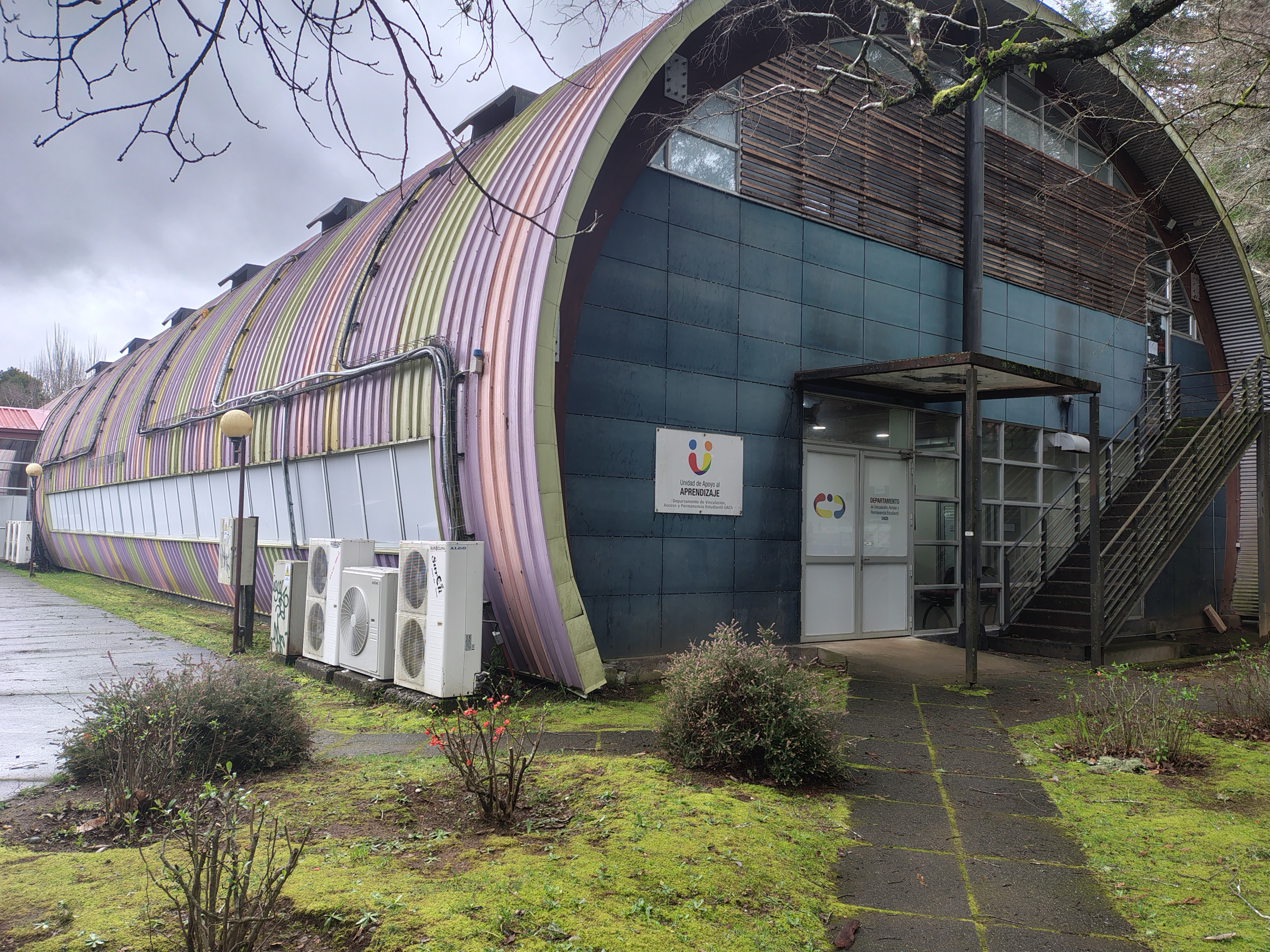
Edificio Nahmias (left) and adjacent Serpentina (right) in Uach's Isla Teja campus

On May 13 of 2008 the student federation of UACh decided to go on strike since they considered that a request list sent to the university administration was answered in too loose terms. The strike and occupation of the university by students ended in late June when the rector Victor Cubillos and the directory ceded on several points but was however still heavily criticized both from students and from sectors of the faculty where they considered that he had ceded too much to students. In April 2010 the reconstruction of the Emilio Pugin building of the Sciencie Faculty, started the competitive bidding. And in this year it would start the reconstruction. Cubillos won the 2010 election with 229 votes, 13 less than the prior election. the second term ended in June 2014.

== Campus ==
UACh main campus, Isla Teja Campus, occupies the whole northwest of Isla Teja in Valdivia. Campus Isla Teja is the home of UACh's administration, Cine Club, botanical garden and most faculties. The botanical garden is a recreational area as well as a place of study with a total of around 950 plant species growing in its 12 ha. Most plants in the botanical garden belong to Valdivian temperate rain forest but there are others with exotic origins. The waters of Cau-Cau River that flows through the northern parts of the botanical garden allows a section of wetland plant species included in the garden.

The engineering faculty operates in Campus Miraflores located along Valdivia River south of Valdivia's Plaza de Armas. A third campus exists in Puerto Montt where business administration, speech and language pathology and aquaculture are studied. UACh has several other properties spread through Los Ríos and Los Lagos Region such as Parque Arboretum in northern Isla Teja, the Calfuco field station in the coast near Niebla and the forests of San Pablo de Tregua in the Andean foothills. A much smaller campus known as Campus Patagonia is located in Coyhaique.

== Research ==
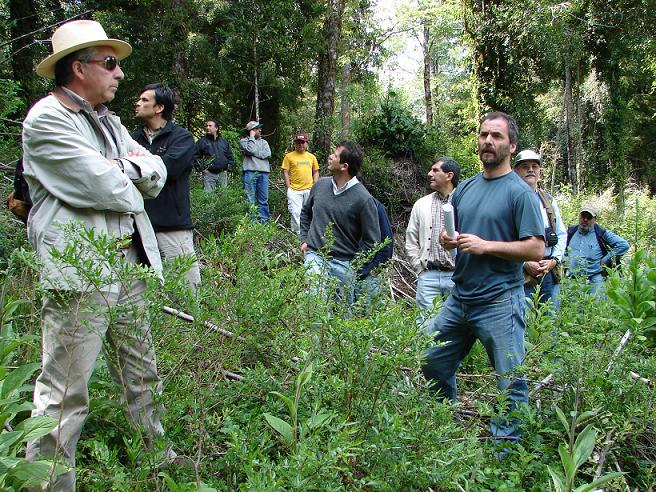
Faculty of UACh in the forests of San Pablo de Tregua

UACh is one of the leading universities of Chile in matters of scientific research. It was ranked second only to the University of Chile in scientific research by El Mercurio and was the third university to receive most of government Mecesup research funds in 2008. Some of the fields where UACh scientists have made contributions include:

- Archaeology: In archeology university scientist Tom Dillehay, led the excavations of at Monte Verde, one of the earliest archaeological sites in the Americas. Another site investigated by university scientists is Chan-Chan a site that gives name to the Archaic Chan-Chan Complex.
- Dairy technology and science: The university's Centro Tecnológico de la Leche (lit. Milk Technology Centre) have been credited by scholar Paulina Rytkönen for being behind the higher dairy productivity in Los Ríos Region when compared with adjacent Los Lagos Region.
- Dendrochronology: Scientists at the Dendrochronology Laboratory of UACh has set up the longest dendrochronology in the Southern Hemisphere going back 5666 years. Researchers have also reconstructed the temperatures of the last 3622 years with tree rings from Fitzroya and have used a dendrochronology network of Lenga Beech, spanning from Talca to Navarino Island, to investigate global warming in the recent decades.
- Mapudungun language: UACh is one of the main sites of Mapudungun linguistic studies and teaching. This is partly due to Professor María Catrileo Chiguailaf, who received in 2009 the Provincial Prize for Conservation of National Monuments for her studies. Her work has focused on the phonology and morpho-syntax of the Mapudungun language and especially the verb forms. Catrileo may be the only living Mapuche to have mastered Spanish, English, and Mapudungun.
- Palaeontology: Palaeontological studies at Southern Chile have involved several UACh academics among them geoarchaeologist Mario Pino who participated at the excavation of the Quaternary fossil site of Pilauco Bajo in Osorno where the remains of a species of Gomphotherium were discovered. Two other Gomphotherium fossil sites in Los Ríos Region are planned to be excavated by university scientists in the future.
- Virology: Researchers from the Faculty of Medicine and Faculty of Science led a series of joint medical, viral and zoological research on the transmittance of Hantavirus between rodents and humans. Hantavirus was first detected in Chile in 1995 but is believed to have been present much time before. According to Dr. Luis Zaror the most important UACh discovery regarding Hantavirus was made in 2005 when Hanta antigens were found on the salivary glands of deceased persons. UACh academics working at the Laboratory of Virology had contributed to diminish the initial mortality of Pulmonar Hantavirus with 60% in Los Ríos Region below the national average of 37%.

=== Scientific journals ===
The university publishes several scientific journals three of them, Bosque, Archivos de Medicina Veterinaria and Estudios Filológicos are part of ISI's bibliographic database. BOSQUE is published by the Faculty of Forest Science. BOSQUE's first number was published in 1975 and was yearly issued until 1985. From 1985 to 2003 it was issued twice a year and from 2003 on thrice a year. The topics covered in BOSQUE are management and production of forestry resources, wood science and technology, silviculture, forestry ecology, natural resources conservation, and rural development associated with forest ecosystems. Contributions are articles, notes and opinions, both in Spanish and English. BOSQUE became part of ISI's bibliographic database in 2009.

In matters of literature, communication science and linguistics the university has published the journal Documentos Lingüísticos y Literarios (DLL) since 1977. Documentos Lingüísticos y Literarios has two sections, one dedicated to articles and comments on literature, linguistics and communication science and another were original literary pieces are published. DLL is one of the few journals containing native Mapudungun literature and linguistic articles.

== Museum network ==
Universidad Austral de Chile runs through its museology department several museums in Valdivia and southern Chile, including; UACh's Contemporary Art Museum, Philippi Museum on the 19th century exploration and settlement of southern Chile and Maurice van de Maele Museum on history and anthropology. The museology department has collections of indigenous artifacts including early indigenous ceramics as well as Mapuche silverwork and textiles. In addition to this there is a collection of objects from the early human settlement of Monte Verde. Other collections include 19th century clothing and toys and an extensive photographical archive dating back to 1850.

== Rankings ==
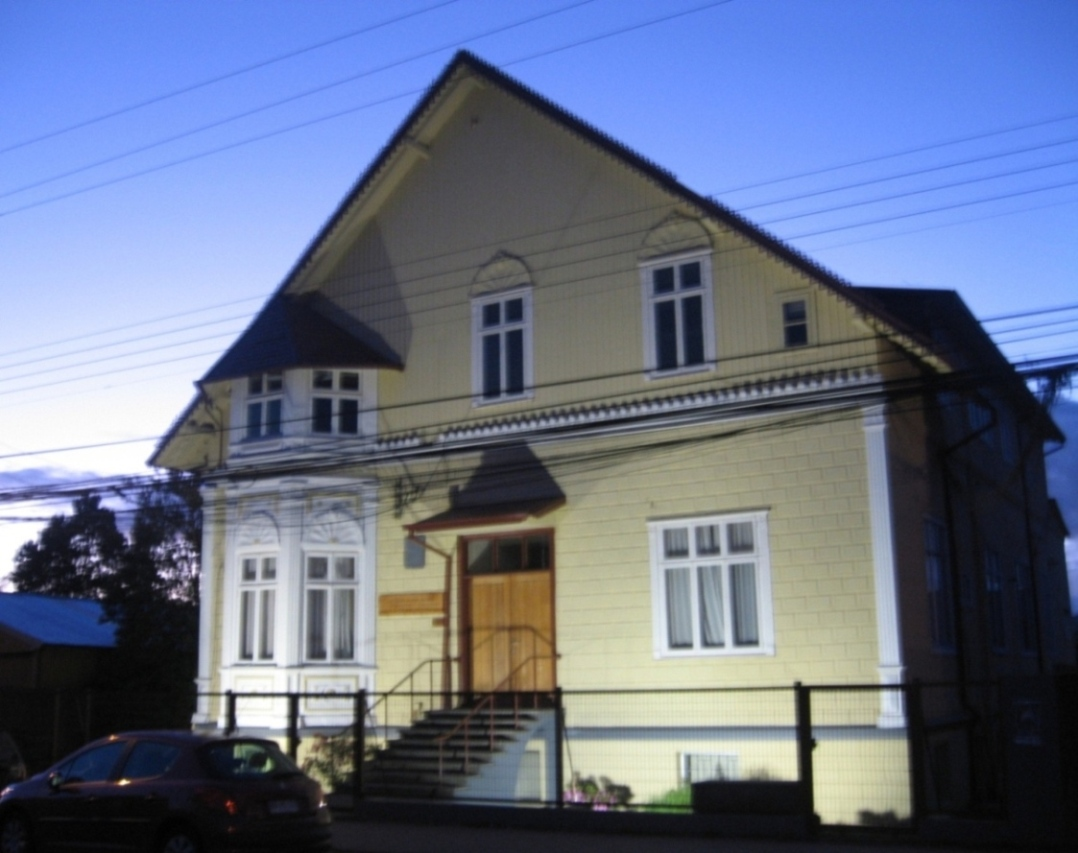
Centro de Educación continua building in downtown Valdivia

In a 2011 university ranking of Quacquarelli Symonds the Austral University of Chile was ranked 30th among Latin American universities, 5th among Chilean universities and second among Chilean universities outside Santiago.

In El Mercurio's 2006 ranking of the "Best Universities in the Country", UACh received the highest score in "teaching quality" of any Chilean university. The same article also listed UACh second only to Universidad de Chile in research quality, and ranked the Valdivia-based university third place overall among Chilean universities. As both universities that earned higher rankings are located in Santiago (U. de Chile and Pontifical Catholic University of Chile), UACh thus became the highest ranking university in Chile outside of the nation's capital.

In the most recent Chilean university ranking released by AméricaEconomía magazine, released in 2009, UACh earned an overall ranking of 7th place, and 4th among universities outside Santiago. In the undergraduate ranking, nursing performed best with 3rd place, then medicine and agronomy at 4th place, then law at 7th place, kinesiology at 8th place and Business Administration (Ingeniería Comercial) at 10th place.

In 2006 UACh's medical students got the second highest marks in Chile in the National Medicine Exam after PUC. In 2007, though, UACh medical students dropped down to fifth place, and by 2008 they were down to sixth place.
