= Realmente Bella Señorita Panamá 2009 =

Beauty pageant edition

- Date: May 15, 2009
- Presenters: Roberto Durán Jr., Madelaine Leignadier Dawson, Roseta Bordanea,
- Venue: Tihany Spectacular, Ciudad de Panamá, Panama
- Broadcaster: Telemetro
- Entrants: 10
- Placements: 6
- Winner: Diana Broce; Los Santos

Realmente Bella Señorita Panamá 2009 is the second edition of the beauty contest format that was created when the Señorita Panamá contest was renewed. It was the 43rd celebration of the Miss Panama contest and the 26th Annual contest Señorita Panamá, was held at the Ascanio Arosemena Auditorium with the final night at the Tihany Spectacular, Panama, Panama on Friday, May 15, 2009. The new pageant would send the winner to Miss Universe 2009.

About 10 contestants from all over the country will compete for the prestigious crown. Realmente Bella Señorita Panamá 2008 Carolina Dementiev of Panama Centro crowned Diana Broce of Los Santos as her successor at the end of the event as the new Señorita Panamá.

Thas year there was a new change. On the same night, the final competition entitled "Señorita Panamá Mundo" was announced as the winner of the Señorita Panamá Mundo title. Giselle Bissot Señorita Panamá World 2006 of Panama Centro crowned Nadege Herrera of Panama Centro as her successor at the end of the event. The First Runner up to Miss Continente Americano 2009.

== Results ==
=== Placements ===
Placement	Contestant
Realmente Bella Señorita Panamá	Los Santos – Diana Broce
Señorita Panamá Mundo 2009	Panamá Centro – Nadege Herrera
Señorita Panamá Continente Americano 2009	Panamá Este – Liseth Díaz
Top 6	Chiriquí – Lissa Talesca; Panamá Oeste – Aylin Delgado; Herrera – Lidia McNulty

=== Special awards ===
Award	Represent	Contestant
Best National Costume	Panamá Centro	Nadege Herrera
Miss Congeniality	Chiriquí	María Pretelt
Miss Photogenic	Colón	Alicia Durán
Best Face	Panamá Centro	Nadege Herrera

== Jury ==
- Carolina Dementiev - Realmente Bella Señorita Panamá 2008
- María Sofía Velásquez - Señorita Panamá 1993
- Miguel Herrera

== Candidates ==
Province Represented	Contestant	Age	Height	Hometown
Chiriquí Occidente	Lissa Talesca	20	1.70	Boquete
Chiriquí Oriente	Giosue Cozzarelli	19	1.67	David
Colón	Alicia Durán	18	1.78	Colón
Los Santos	Diana Broce	22	1.70	Las Tablas
Panamá Centro	Nadege Herrera	22	1.82	Ciudad de Panamá
Herrera	Lidia McNulty	19	1.70	Las Tablas
Panamá Este	Liseth Díaz	24	1.70	Ciudad de Panamá
Panamá Oeste	Aylin Delgado	18	1.72	Ciudad de Panamá
Chiriquí	María Luisa Pretelt	22	1.71	David
Veraguas	Stephanie Thompson	18	1.71	Ciudad de Panamá

== Candidates Notes ==
- Diana Broce won the Best National Costume in Miss Universe 2009.
- Nadege Herrera was top 7 (5th) in Miss World 2009, also was Finalist in Miss World Beach Beauty (1RUp), Top Model and Best Designer.
- Lidia McNulty was Miss Supranational Panama 2011 and place in the top 20 in Miss Supranational 2011.
- Giosue Cozzarelli represented Panama in Miss All Nations 2010.
