= Nadege Herrera =

Panamanian model

- Born: Nadege Elena Herrera Vásquez; 17 November 1986 (age 39); Panama City, Panama
- Height: 1.82 m (5 ft 11 1/2 in)
- Beauty pageant titleholder
- Title: Miss Panama World 2009
- Major competitions: Realmente Bella Señorita Panamá 2009 (Winner); Miss World 2009 (Top 7)

Nadege Elena Herrera Vásquez (born 17 November 1986) is a Panamanian model and beauty pageant titleholder. Her career started in 2004 at the age of 17. She joined Panama's leg of the Ford Supermodel of the World contest, called "Chica and Chico Modelo". After this competition, Nadege won the "World Casting Tour" held that same year, winning a $10,000 contract with modeling agency Wilhelmina in New York.

Her modelling experience helped her land some of Panama's major advertising campaigns and editorials, making her one of the most popular models in the country, both in runway and photography. In 2005, she travelled to Hong Kong to compete in the Miss Model of the World contest. She has also won a small pageant held in Ecuador.

In 2007, Herrera was selected as a finalist in the reality show Supermodel Centroamérica, hosted by Costa Rican top model, former Miss Asia Pacific International and Miss World Costa Rica, Leonora Jiménez. Upon her return to Panama, she continued working as a runway and print model.

== Realmente Bella Señorita Panamá 2009 ==
In March 2009 she joined the Realmente Bella Señorita Panamá pageant, where she won the title of Miss Panama World, which gave her the opportunity to compete in Miss World.

== Miss World 2009 ==
Herrera represented Panama at the Miss World 2009 pageant held on December 12, 2009, in Johannesburg, South Africa, where she placed among the Top 7 finalists, finishing as the fifth runner-up to Kaiane Aldorino of Gibraltar.

== Television ==
She also was TV Host in Panama rangefinder where the TV show presented La Rueda de La Fortuna with Rasiel Rodriguez and later with Jorge Herrera. Now she is the TV Host of Kosmetika by TVN also by the ex-Miss Panama Anyoli Abrego.

== See also ==
- Diana Broce

Awards and achievements
Preceded by Kathia Saldaña	Miss Panama World; 2009	Succeeded by Paola Vaprio
Preceded by Stefanie de Roux	Miss Panama Earth; 2007	Succeeded by Shassia Ubillús
