= Cozzarelli =

Cozzarelli is a surname. Notable people with the surname include:

- Giosue Cozzarelli (born 1989), Panamanian beauty queen, model, and YouTube celebrity of Italian descent
- Guidoccio Cozzarelli (1450–1517), Italian painter and miniaturist
- Nicholas R. Cozzarelli (1938–2006), American biochemist
  - Cozzarelli Prize, named in honor of the above

Frank D. Cozzarelli (1930–1979), American Artist. Painter, sculptor, potter, pulp fiction book cover artist.
