= Rodulfo Amando Philippi Bañados =

Chilean ornithologist

- Born: 25 May 1905; Santiago, Chile
- Died: 31 July 1969 (aged 64); Santiago
- Scientific career
- Fields: Ornithology
- Institutions: Museo Nacional de Historia Natural de Chile

Rodulfo Amando Philippi Bañados (25 May 1905 – 31 July 1969) was a Chilean ornithologist. The great-grandson of German naturalist Rodolfo Amando Philippi (1808–1904), he worked at the Museo Nacional de Historia Natural de Chile as a curator of birds and wrote extensively on Chilean ornithology. By profession, he was a pediatrician.

Philippi was born in Santiago, Chile to physician Otto Philippi and trained in medicine like his father and became a paediatrician. He however took a keen interest in ornithology and was a curator of birds at the Museo Nacional de Historia Natural in Santiago from 1938 to 1966 and published some of the major works on the birds of the region.
