= Mister Nicaragua =

National male beauty pageant in Nicaragua

- Type: Male beauty pageant
- Headquarters: Managua
- represented: Nicaragua
- Qualifies for: Manhunt International; Mister World; Mister International
- Language: Spanish

Mister Nicaragua is a male beauty pageant in Nicaragua that selects the country's representatives to the Manhunt International, Mister World, and Mister International of the major international beauty pageants.

== Mister Nicaragua representatives ==
The winner of Mister Nicaragua represented her country at the Manhunt International. On occasion, when the winner does not qualify (due to age) for either contest, a runner-up is sent.

- : Declared as winner
- : Ended as runner-up or top 5/6 qualification
- : Ended as one of the finalists or semifinalists
- : Ended as special awards winner

=== Manhunt International ===
| Year | Department | Mister Nicaragua | Placement | Special awards |
|---|---|---|---|---|
| 2026 | Managua | Erlin Jesús Ayerdis Hernández | Top 20 | |
| 2024 | Managua | Jeril Antonio Vado Quintero | Top 20 | |
| 2022 | Chontales | Hanniel Espinoza | Top 10 | |
| 2017 | León | José Antonio Vallejos Pérez | Unplaced | |
| 2010 | Managua | William Alberto Rodríguez Morales | Unplaced | Mr Alishan |
| 2005 | Masaya | Gabriel Huete Guillen | Top 10 | |
| 2002 | Managua | Dennis Schwartz Arce | Unplaced | |
| 2001 | Managua | German Dominique Ramirez | Unplaced | |
| 2000 | Managua | Mario Zavala Gadea | Unplaced | |

=== Mister World ===
| Year | Department | Mister Nicaragua | Placement | Special awards |
|---|---|---|---|---|
| 2024 | Managua | Erlin Jesús Ayerdis Hernández | Unplaced | |
| 2019 | León | José Antonio Vallejos Pérez | Unplaced | |
| 2016 | Managua | Edson Janyny Bonilla Álvarez | Unplaced | |

=== Mister International ===
| Year | Department | Mister Nicaragua | Placement | Special awards |
|---|---|---|---|---|
| 2026 | Managua | Luciano Andres López | Unplaced | |
| 2025 | Managua | Jonathan "John" Amador | Unplaced | |
Did not compete between 2023–2024
| 2022 | Leon | Jonathan Alberto López Flores | Unplaced | |
Due to the impact of COVID-19 pandemic, no between 2019–2021
| 2018 | RACCS | Naykel Alexander Niño | Unplaced | Best National Costume |
| 2017 | Granada | Elvis Junior Arias Murillo | Top 10 | |

== See also ==
- Miss Universe Nicaragua
- Miss Mundo Nicaragua
- Miss International Nicaragua
- Miss Grand Nicaragua
- Miss Earth Nicaragua
