= Juan Camilo Salazar =

Juan Camilo Salazar may refer to:

- Juan Camilo Salazar (footballer, born 1997), Colombian winger
- Juan Camilo Salazar (footballer, born 1998), Colombian forward
