= Quinta Normal Park =

Public park in Santiago, Chile

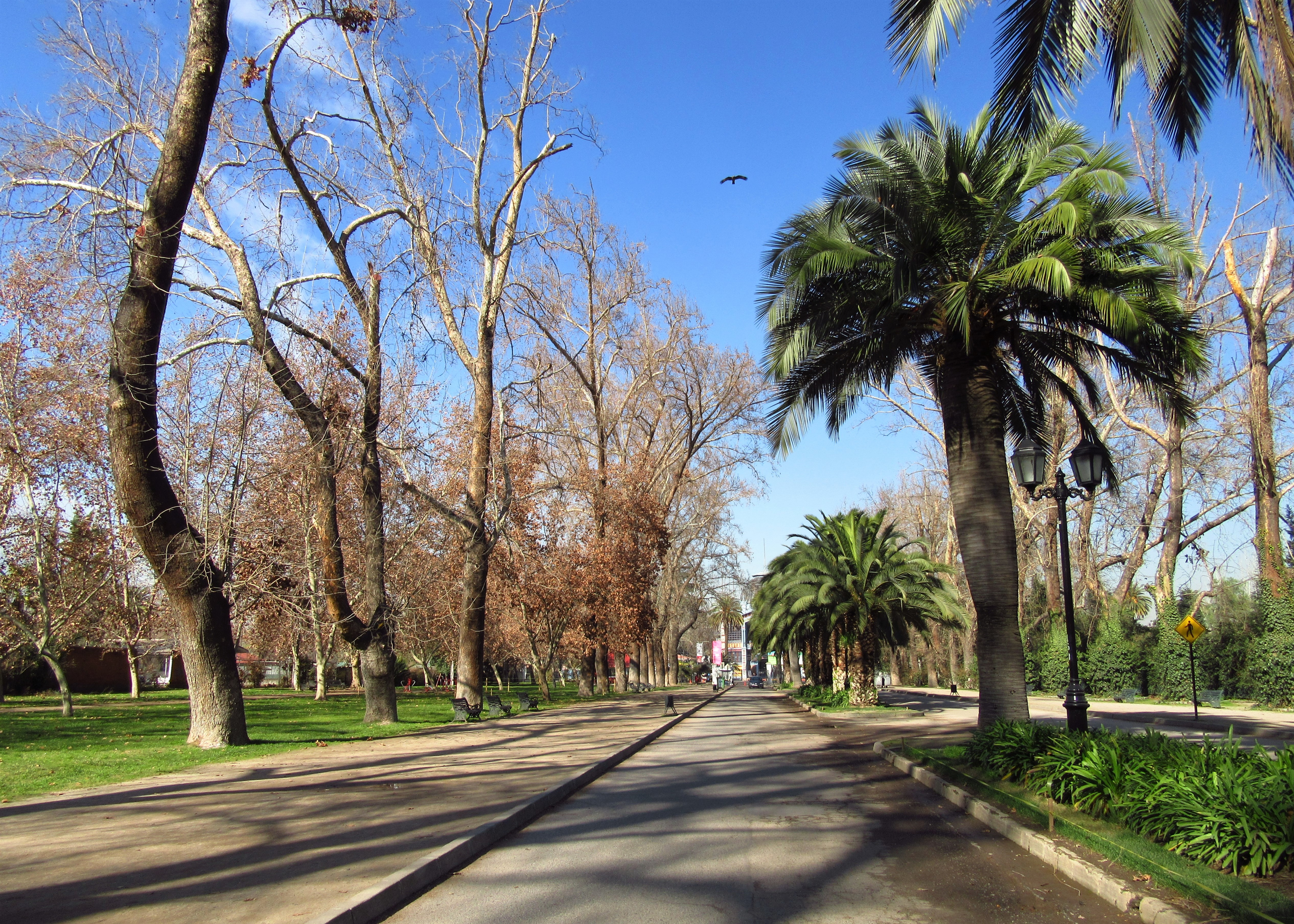
- Las Palmeras Avenue
- Interactive map of Quinta Normal Park
- Type: Urban park
- Location: Santiago, Chile
- Coordinates: 33°26′26.57″S 70°40′57.35″W
- Area: 35.5 ha (88 acres)
- Operator: Santiago (municipality)

Quinta Normal Park is an urban park in the city of Santiago, Chile. The park is located in the Commune of Santiago with its namesake commune, Quinta Normal, situated just outside the park across the communal boundary. The park spans 35.5 hectares (88 acres) and is bounded by Matucana Avenue to the east, Portales Avenue to the south and Santo Domingo Street to the north. It is home to several cultural institutions, including the Chilean National Museum of Natural History, and features a railroad museum. The park was founded in 1841, originally intended for greenhouses to cultivate foreign plant species, and has since become a popular space for recreation.

In addition to its museums, Quinta Normal Park offers various amenities for visitors. A recent addition is a water feature where children can play and paddle boats can be rented. At the park's rear, there are standing grills available for public use, perfect for barbecues. The park is historically significant, having hosted the Chilean International Exhibition in 1875.

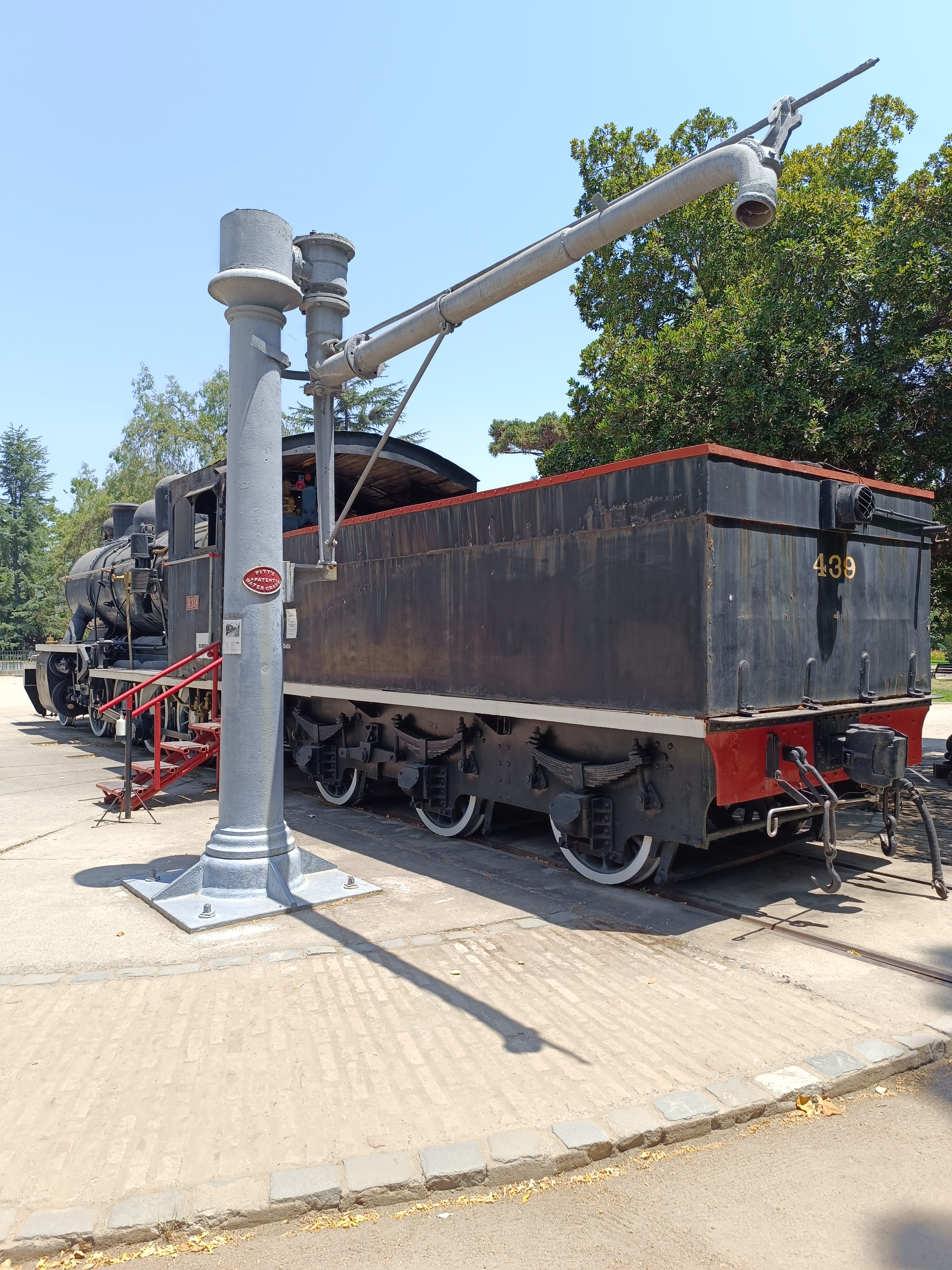
Water crane. Stothert & Pitt, 1875. Santiago Railway Museum

The Santiago Railway Museum is located in this park. It displays 16 historic steam locomotives and other railway artifacts. Its water crane dates from 1875 and was built in England by Stothert & Pitt in Bath, Somerset.

== Transport ==
The park can be accessed by the Santiago Metro via the metro station that bears its name.

== Nearby Landmarks ==
The Museum of Memory and Human Rights and the Santiago Library are also located in the immediate vicinity. Across the street from the north side of the park lies the Sanctuary of Lourdes, which includes a Lourdes grotto.
