= Carolina Dementiev =

Panamanian model (born 1989)

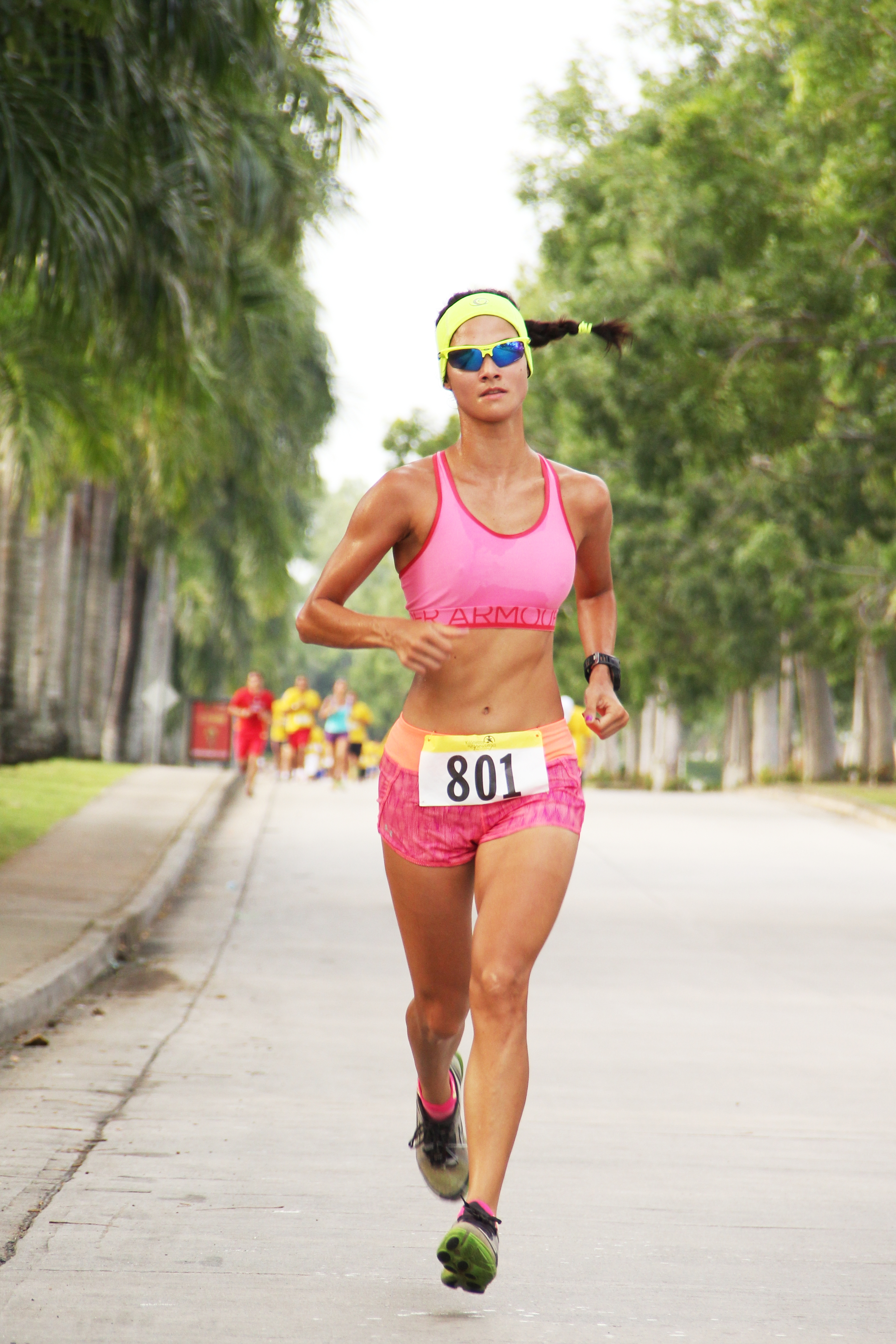
- Born: Carolina Dementiev Justavino; 1 February 1989 (age 37); Saint Petersburg, Russia
- Height: 1.73 m (5 ft 8 in)
- Beauty pageant titleholder
- Title: Miss Panama Universe 2008
- Hair color: Brunette
- Eye color: Hazel
- Major competitions: Realmente Bella Señorita Panamá 2008, Miss Universe 2008.

Carolina Dementiev Justavino (born 1 February 1989) is a Russian-Panamanian model, tv host, ironman and beauty pageant titleholder who won the Miss Panama 2008 pageant. She also represented Panama in the 57th Miss Universe 2008, held at the Diamond Bay Resort in Nha Trang, Vietnam.

== Modelling career ==
Her start in the modeling world took place when she joined the "Chica Modelo" (a model search) contest in 2004 which she won at 17 years. It also gave her the chance to work for Physical Modelos. As a model, Justavino has taken part in calendars, commercial and as a stewardess in different events.

== Realmente Bella Señorita Panamá 2008 ==
In 2008, Dementiev joined the Realmente Bella Señorita Panamá pageant, where she won the title of Miss Panama Universe, which gave her the opportunity to compete in Miss Universe 2008.

== IRONMAN ==
Dementiev competed in the World Champion IRONMAN 2013 in Las Vegas, finishing #629 out of 2000 participants.

=== Doping ===
In 2016, Dementiev was suspended during 24 months for use cream with dopant by WADA (World Anti-Doping Agency).

== Brand ambassador ==
Dementiev is a brand ambassador for Panama Blue, a premium bottled water.

Awards and achievements
Preceded by Sorangel Matos	Miss Panama; 2008	Succeeded by Diana Broce
