= Chilean International Exhibition =

1875–1876 world's fair in Santiago, Chile

Overview
- BIE-class: Unrecognized exposition
- Name: Chilean International Exhibition
- Building(s): Chilean National Museum of Natural History
- Organized by: National Agricultural Society

Participant(s)
- Countries: 20

Location
- Country: Chile
- City: Santiago
- Venue: Quinta Normal Park
- Coordinates: 33.44217°S 70.68184°W

Timeline
- Opening: 16 September 1875
- Closure: 16 January 1876

The Chilean International Exhibition was a world's fair held in Quinta Normal Park, Santiago, between 16 September 1875 and 16 January 1876 to show Chilean people recent technological and scientific advances.

== Organisation ==
The event was organised by the National Agricultural Society, opened by the president Federico Errázuriz Zañartu, and originally scheduled to run until 31 December 1875, but it was extended to 16 January 1876.

== Location and buildings ==
The fair took place on what is now the Quinta Normal Park with a central permanent palace, which is now the Chilean National Museum of Natural History). There were two long buildings, which formed the machinery gallery and the Rose Innes pavilion, housing threshing machines, a restaurant and a pavilion each for Belgium and France.

== Participants ==
Foreign countries who participated were Argentina, Belgium, Bolivia, Brazil, Colombia, Ecuador, El Salvador, France, Germany, Great Britain, Guatemala, Italy, Mexico, Nicaragua, Peru, Switzerland, The United States, Uruguay and Venezuela.

== Exhibitors ==
Exhibitors included the Chilean painter Onofre Jarpa who won a medal.
