= Rodolfo Amando Philippi =

German-Chilean naturalist and palaeontologist (1808–1904)

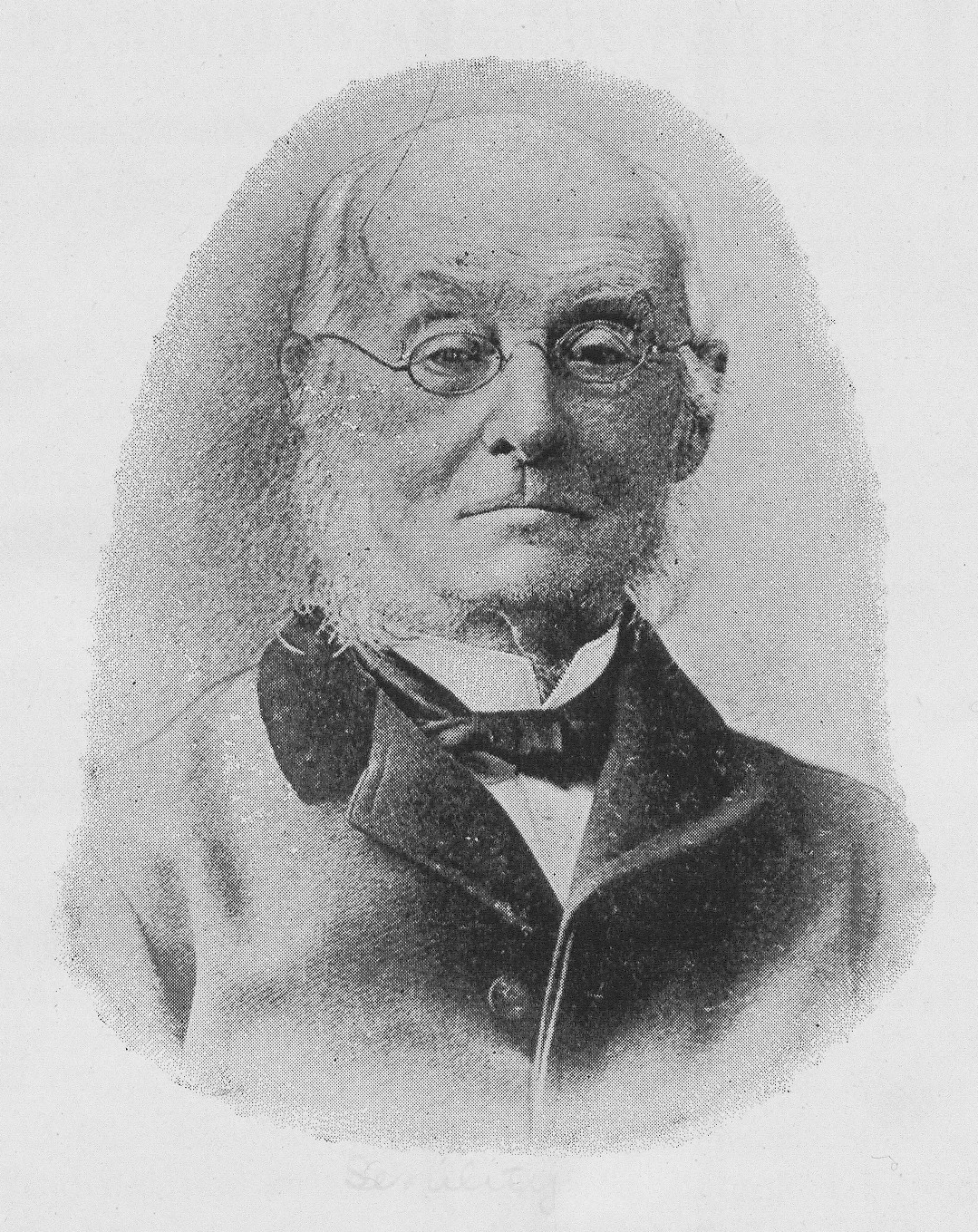
- Born: 14 September 1808; Charlottenburg, Prussia
- Died: 23 July 1904 (aged 95); Santiago, Chile
- Education: University of Berlin
- Known for: Contributions to malacology, paleontology, and entomology
- Children: Federico Philippi (son)
- Relatives: Rodulfo Amando Philippi Bañados (great-grandson)
- Scientific career
- Fields: Paleontology, Zoology
- Author abbrev. (zoology): Philippi

Rodolfo Amando (or Rudolph Amandus) Philippi (14 September 1808 – 23 July 1904) was a German–Chilean paleontologist and zoologist. Philippi contributed primarily to malacology and paleontology, but also published a major work on Diptera of Chile. His great-grandson, Rodulfo Amando Philippi Bañados (1905-1969), was also a zoologist.

== Early life ==
Philippi was born in Charlottenburg, Berlin to Johann Wilhelm Eberhard Philippi, a Prussian government auditor, and his third wife Maria Anna Krumwiede (m. 1806). The father had five children from two earlier marriages and Philippi was the eldest from the third marriage. In 1818, Philippi, his younger brother Bernhard Eunom (1811–1852) and their mother went to Yverdon-les-Bains, Switzerland, where they were educated at the Pestalozzian Institute founded by Johann Heinrich Pestalozzi (1746–1827). The teaching included the use of natural objects for teaching and Philippi was involved in collecting plants and butterflies at a young age. The move was caused by an affair of their father with the housekeeper and led to the separation of the parents. The three returned to Berlin in 1822 where Philippi went to the Königliche Gymnasium zum Grauen Kloster (founded in 1574) and in 1826 he moved to the Friedrich-Wilhelms-Universität Berlin and graduated in 1830. His studies included medicine, surgery, comparative anatomy, botany and zoology. His dissertation was on the orthoptera of Berlin (Orthoptera Berolinensia). Respiratory illness forced him to leave Berlin in 1830 to warmer parts of Italy where he travelled around with the geologists Friedrich Hoffmann and Arnold Escher von der Lind who were studying Etna and Vesuvius. Philippi began to look at fossils here. He also collected molluscs and interacted with the Italian Benedictine priest and malacologist Emiliano Guttadauro (1759–1836) who encouraged him to study molluscs. He returned briefly to Berlin to complete his medical studies and qualified as a physician in 1833. He then worked as a teacher at Kassel from 1835. In 1836 he married a cousin, Caroline Krumwiede, who came from a well-to-do family and hoped that the means would let him study molluscs.

== Early career ==
His first major work on molluscs based on his collections from Sicily was published in 1836. For this work, he received a medal from Kaiser Friedrich Wilhelm III thanks to a recommendation from Alexander von Humboldt. Along with 14 others, he founded the Vereins für Naturkunde (Natural History Society) of Kassel the same year. In 1837 he was diagnosed with pneumonia and told that he had to move to a drier climate. He then moved to Sicily living there for several years, recovering his health. He began to collect molluscs in earnest, making use of a collector trained by Italian malacologist Arcangelo Scacchi (1810–1893). In 1840 he returned to Kassel, with a stop in Neuchâtel where he met Louis Agassiz. At Kassel, he interacted with the local malacologists who included Karl Menke, who had begun the first journal in German, Zeitschrift für Malakozoologie in 1844. This led to an increased productivity, and he wrote several books including Abbildungen (illustrated monographs), leading to a medal from the new King, Kaiser Friedrich Wilhelm IV. His brother Bernhard Eunom Philippi in the meantime became a successful merchant and sailed to Chile several times, making collections for museums. Bernhard moved to Chile in 1841 and encouraged Germans to emigrate to Punta Arenas, an area that he helped seize control of, and had been made a governor of the Magellan Province.

== Move to Chile ==
Philippi was caught up in the German revolutions of 1848–1849 and was seen as a liberal and threatened. He escaped Kassel with help from another malacologist Friedrich Carl Ludwig Koch (1799–1852), whose daughter had been engaged to Bernhard. He stayed underground in Karlshütte (near Delligsen, Lower Saxony) and left Germany on 20 July 1851 aboard the Bonito. He left the rest of his family behind and received letters of introduction from Alexander von Humboldt to aid his travels in Chile. Bernhard was killed in Punta Arenas in 1852. Philippi directed a high school in Valdivia from 1853 and he was also appointed professor of zoology and botany at the Universidad de Chile (Santiago), as well as director of the natural history museum there. He was also sent on an expedition into the Atacama Desert. Philippi's wife and children moved to Chile in 1856 but his wife died in 1867 and two children died young. He worked on several books on natural history in Chile and collaborated with travelling European naturalists like Christian Ludwig Landbeck as well as with museums in Europe. Philippi received an honorary doctorate from the University of Berlin in 1890 and a second one in 1900. On his 90th birthday, a celebration was held in his honour at the university with the military band playing Wagner's Tannhäuser. Philippi described a number of species across taxa, including three new species of South American lizards. It was shortly after completing a monograph on the Chilean frogs in 1904 that he was diagnosed with pneumonia, leading to his death. A state holiday was announced the next day and his body was kept for public viewing and was visited by 10000 people. The 284-horse-drawn cortege was lined along its route by 30,000 people including schoolchildren and the entire Chilean parliament and cabinet were in attendance. He was buried in the Santiago Catholic Church where Philippi, as being Lutheran, was buried in a corner called the Dissidents’ Courtyard.

== Legacy ==
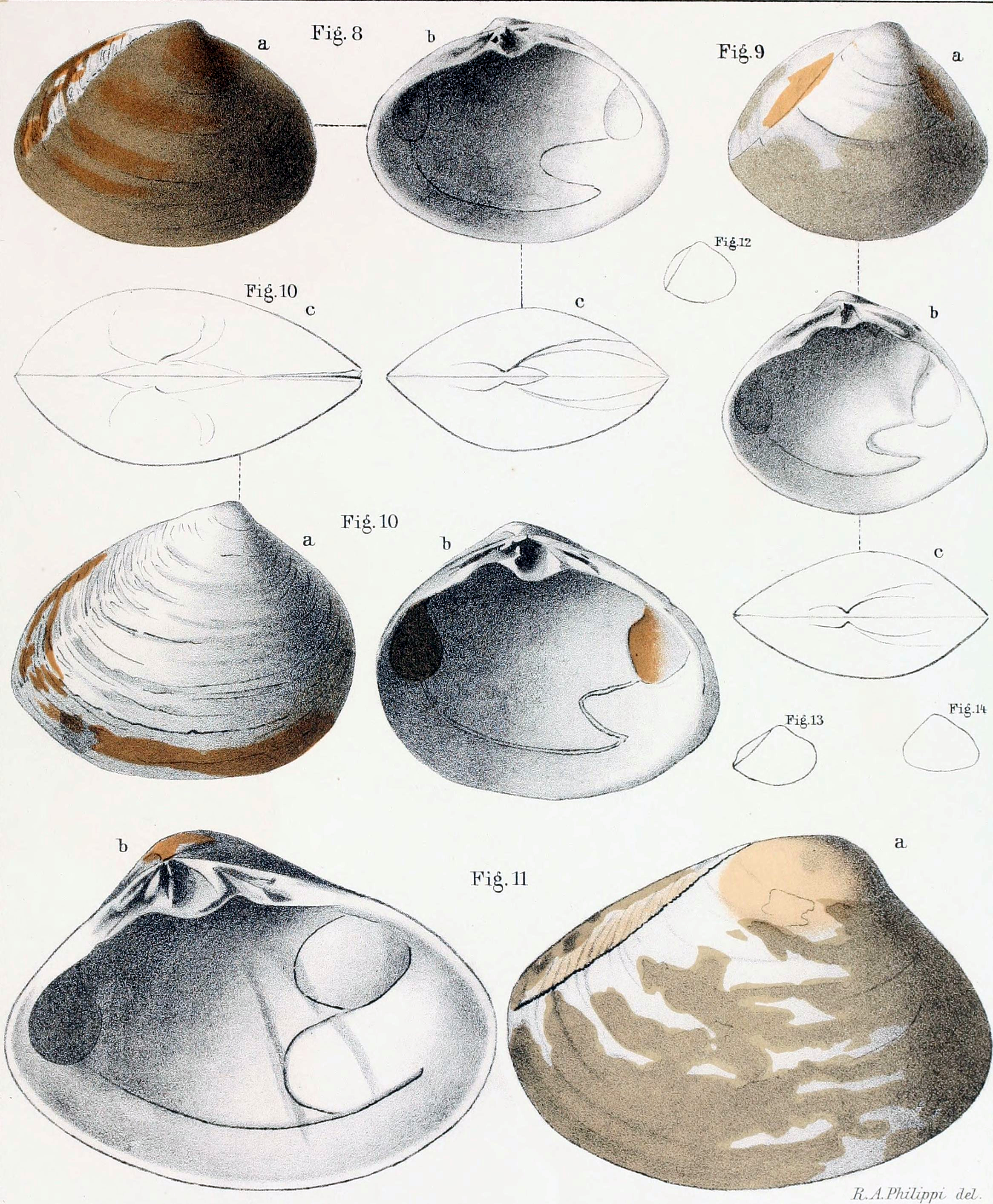
Species drawing by Philippi

Philippi described more than 2500 new taxa of molluscs (both extant and fossil) in 40 genera and three families, and more than 425 new species of Diptera. As of 2006, 1,670 of species he described are considered valid, of which 1,017 plants, 650 animals and three fungae. Over 10% of Chiles angiosperms, amphibians, dermaptera and phasmapods were first described by Philippi. He also described Cephaloptera tarapacana, a new species of Myliobatiform ray, later accepted as Mobula tarapacana.

A species of snake, Tropidodipsas philippii, is named in his honor. In 1897, botanist Carlos Luigi Spegazzini published Philippiella, a monotypic genus of flowering plants from Argentina and Chile, belonging to the family Thymelaeaceae named after him. Museo de la Exploración Rudolph Amandus Philippi in Valdivia is named after him.

Philippi's youngest son, Federico Philippi (1838–1910), was also a zoologist and botanist.

== Selected works ==
- Philippi, RA (1836). Enumeratio molluscorum Siciliae cum viventium tum in tellure tertiaria fossilium, quae in itinere suo observavit (in Latin). Vol. 1. Berolini [Berlin]: S. Schroppii.
- Philippi, RA (1844). Enumeratio molluscorum Siciliae cum viventium tum in tellure tertiaria fossilium, quae in itinere suo observavit (in Latin). Vol. 2. Halis Saxorum [Halle]: Eduard Anton.
- Philippi, RA (1864). "Plantarum novarum Chilensium, inclusis quibusdam Mendocinis et Patagonicis". Linnaea (in Latin). 33: 1–308.
- Philippi, RA (1866). Aufzählung der chilenischen Dipteren (in German). Wien [Vienna]: Zoologischen-Botanischen Gesellschaft in Wien.
- Philippi, RA (1871). "Beschreibung einiger neuer chilenischer Insecten". Entomologische Zeitung (in German). 32: 285–295.

== Taxon described by him ==
- See Category:Taxa named by Rodolfo Amando Philippi
