= Iva Grijalva Pashova =

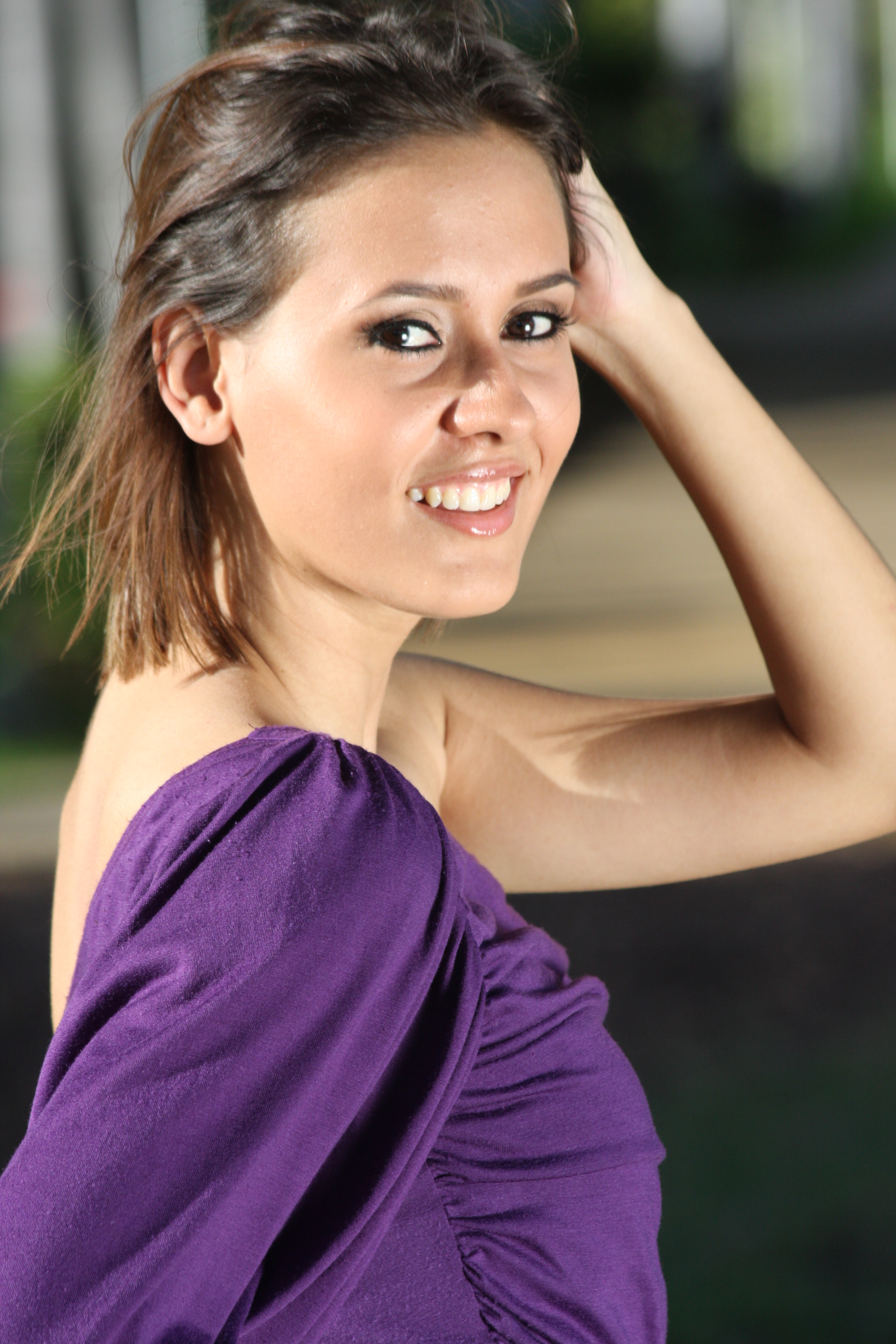
- Born: Iva Karlos Grijalva Pashova; 1 January 1986 (age 40); Sofia, Bulgaria
- Occupations: Beauty pageant, Celebrity, Model
- Beauty pageant titleholder
- Title: Miss Earth Nicaragua 2007
- Hair color: Brown
- Eye color: Brown

Iva Karlos Grijalva Pashova (Spanish: [ˈiβa ˈkaɾlos ɣɾiˈxalβa paˈʃoβa], Bulgarian: [ˈivɐ ˈkarɫoz ɡriˈxaɫbɐ pɐˈʃɔvɐ] born 1 January 1986, in Bulgaria) is a Nicaraguan-Bulgarian actress, model and beauty pageant titleholder. her mother is a Bulgarian and father is Nicaraguan. In 2007 she was one of the 12 contestants of Supermodel Centroamérica, a spin-off from America's Next Top Model. She was crowned Miss Earth Nicaragua 2007, and competed in the Miss Earth 2007 pageant but was top 8. In 2008 she was Nicaragua's entry in the 'World Queen of Banana' pageant held in Machala, Ecuador. she was unplaced.

Awards and achievements
Preceded by Sharon Amador	Miss Earth Nicaragua; 2007	Succeeded by Thelma Rodríguez
