= Archivos de Medicina Veterinaria =

- Discipline: Veterinary medicine
- Language: English, Spanish
- Edited by: Gustavo Monti

Publication details
- History: 1969–present
- Publisher: Southern University of Chile (Chile)
- Frequency: Triannual
- Open access: Yes
- License: CC BY-NC-ND 3.0
- Impact factor: 0.391 (2018)

Standard abbreviations
- ISO 4: Arch. Med. Vet.

Indexing
- ISSN: 0301-732X
- OCLC no.: 807903940

Links
- Journal homepage; Online access

Archivos de Medicina Veterinaria is a peer-reviewed scientific journal published by the Faculty of Veterinary Sciences of the Universidad Austral de Chile (Austral University of Chile). It covers research on a wide range of veterinary medicine and animal welfare topics.

== Abstracting and indexing ==
The journal is abstracted and indexed in the Science Citation Index Expanded, Current Contents/Agriculture, Biology and Environmental Sciences, and Biological Abstracts.
