= Supermodel Centroamérica =

- Genre: Reality television
- Presented by: Leonora Jiménez
- Judges: Kito Rojas; Tony Daza; George Caballero; Dafne Montiel
- Country of origin: Costa Rica
- No. of episodes: 13

Production
- Executive producer: Gustavo Dallmeier

Original release
- Release: 4 August – 27 October 2007

Supermodel Centroamérica (English: Supermodel Central America) was a reality documentary that features contestants from the participating countries Costa Rica, El Salvador, Guatemala, Honduras, Nicaragua and Panama that are living in a villa in Heredia, Costa Rica and do a variety of model-business-based competitions to determine who will win title Super Model Centroamérica.

The show was hosted by Costa Rican model Leonora Jiménez. Season one premiered in August 2007, and was won by Lisseth Cáceres from Panama. She receives the opportunity to participate in an advertising campaign.

In its second year, the show became a beauty-pageant style search, where each country had its own model search where all of the national winners got a ticket for the Supermodel of the World contest.

== Series summary ==
Season	Premiere date	Winner	Runners-up	Other contestants in order of elimination	Number of contestants	International destination
1	August 2007	Panama; Lisseth Cáceres	Costa Rica; Nadine Maxwell	Gabriela Rubio, Iva Grijalva, Mariel Lagos, Graciela Monetenegro, Marcela Alger & Jessica Sánchez, Leslie Lino, Iris Vega, Nadege Herrera, Denisse Rivas	12	None

=== Contestants ===
Country	Contestant	Ranking
Guatemala	Gabriela Rubio	12th
Nicaragua	Iva Grijalva	11th
Honduras	Mariel Lagos	10th
Guatemala	Graciela Montenegro	9th
El Salvador	Marcela Alger	8th/7th
Costa Rica	Jessica Sánchez	8th/7th
Honduras	Leslie Lino	6th
Nicaragua	Iris Vega	5th
Panama	Nadege Herrera	4th
El Salvador	Denisse Rivas	3rd
Costa Rica	Nadine Maxwell	Runner-up
Panama	Lisseth Cáceres	Winner

=== Call-out order ===
Leonora’s Call-out Order
Order	Episodes								
Order	2	3	4	5	6	7	8	9	10
1	Jessica	Lisseth	Denisse	Lisseth	Nadege	Nadine	Nadine	Denisse	Lisseth
2	Denisse	Marcela	Nadine	Denisse	Denisse	Lisseth	Denisse	Lisseth	Nadine
3	Marcela	Denisse	Jessica	Nadege	Leslie	Denisse	Lisseth	Nadine	Denisse
4	Leslie	Jessica	Marcela	Marcela	Lisseth	Nadege	Nadege	Nadege	
5	Lisseth	Graciela	Lisseth	Leslie	Nadine	Iris	Iris		
6	Iris	Nadine	Leslie	Nadine	Iris	Leslie			
7	Mariel	Iris	Graciela	Iris	Jessica				
8	Graciela	Mariel	Nadege	Jessica	Marcela				
9	Nagede	Leslie	Iris	Graciela					
10	Nadine	Nadege	Mariel						
11	Iva	Iva							
12	Gabriela								

The contestant was eliminated
The contestant won the competition

=== Results ===
Place	Model	Episodes									
Place	Model	1	2	3	4	5	6	7	8	9	10
1	Lisseth	SAFE	SAFE	SAFE	SAFE	SAFE	SAFE	SAFE	SAFE	LOW	Winner
2	Nadine	SAFE	SAFE	SAFE	SAFE	SAFE	SAFE	SAFE	SAFE	LOW	OUT
3	Denisse	SAFE	SAFE	SAFE	WIN	SAFE	SAFE	SAFE	SAFE	SAFE	OUT
4	Nadege	SAFE	SAFE	SAFE	SAFE	SAFE	SAFE	SAFE	LOW	OUT	
5	Iris	SAFE	LOW	SAFE	SAFE	SAFE	SAFE	SAFE	OUT		
6	Leslie	SAFE	SAFE	SAFE	SAFE	SAFE	SAFE	OUT			
7	Jessica	WIN	SAFE	SAFE	SAFE	SAFE	OUT				
8	Graciela	SAFE	SAFE	SAFE	LOW	OUT					
9	Marcela	SAFE	SAFE	SAFE	OUT						
10	Iva	LOW	SAFE	OUT							
11	Mariel	SAFE	OUT								
12	Grabiela	OUT									

The contestant was in danger of elimination
The contestant was eliminated
The contestant won photo of the week
The contestant won the competition

=== Judges ===
- Kito Rojas
- Tony Daza
- George Caballero
- Dafne Montiel
