= Realmente Bella Señorita Panamá 2008 =

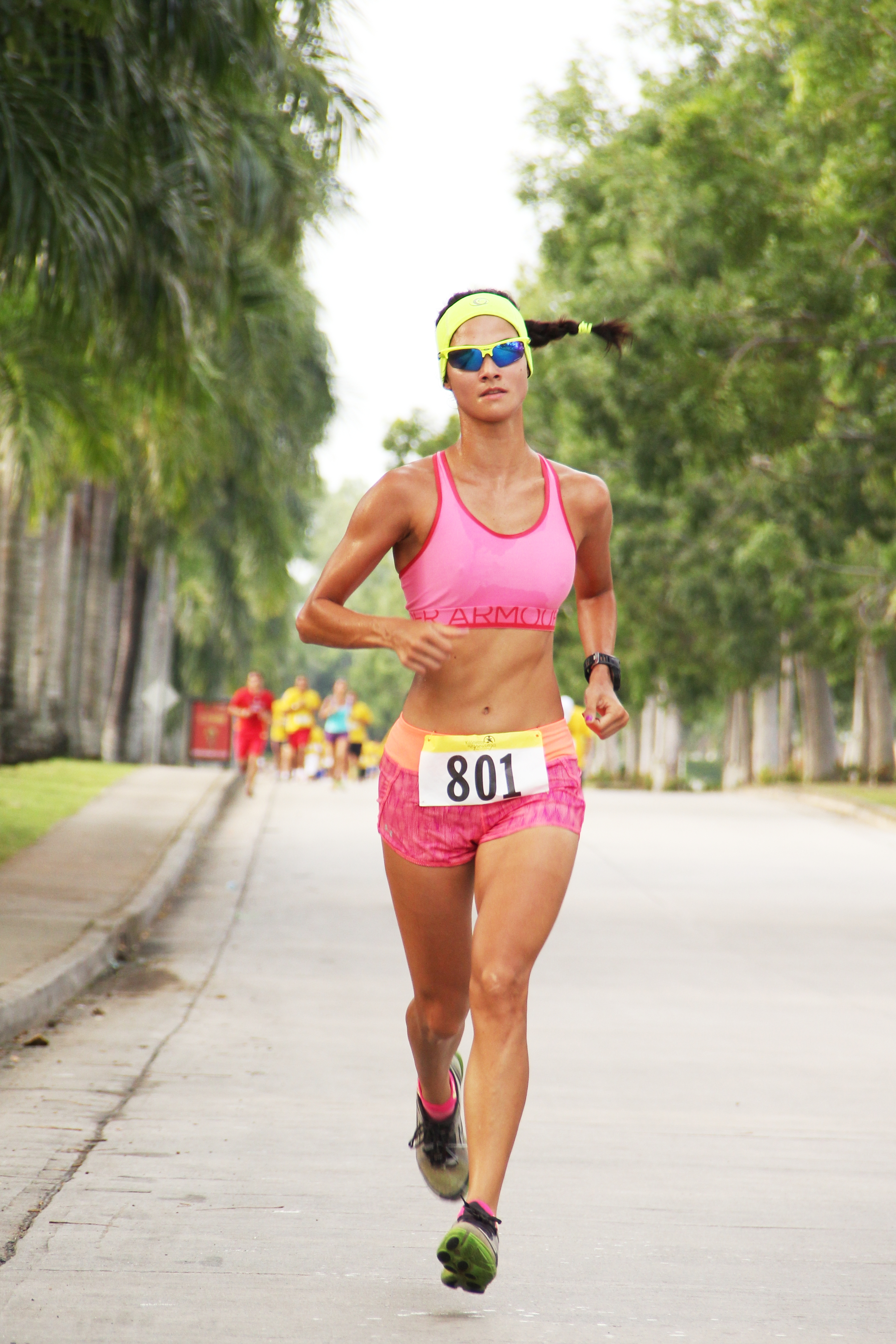
- Carolina Dementiev Señorita Panamá /Miss Universe 2008
- Date: May 26, 2008
- Presenters: Andrea Pérez & Marianella Salazar
- Venue: Studio "B" de Canal 13 Telemetro, Ciudad de Panamá, Panama
- Broadcaster: Telemetro
- Entrants: 10
- Placements: 4
- Winner: Carolina Dementiev; Panamá Centro

Realmente Bella Señorita Panamá 2008 was the new beauty contest format created when the Señorita Panamá contest was renewed. It was the 42nd celebration of the Miss Panama contest and the 25th Annual contest Señorita Panamá, was held at the Estudio "B" Canal 13 Telemetro, Panama, Panama on Monday, May 26, 2008. The pageant was made to send the winner to Miss Universe 2008.

For this year, the pageant was made into a reality show and it was made to be like America's Next Top Model and each week a candidate would leave until only 4 remained.

Señorita Panamá 2005 María Alessandra Mezquita Lapadula of Panama Centro crowned Carolina Dementiev of Panama Centro as her successor at the end of the event as the new Señorita Panamá.

The First Runner up to Miss Continente Americano 2008. Corporacion MEDCOM S.A., organizers of Senorita Panama, did not have the rights to send a contestant to Miss World in 2008. That year the license was property of agency Panama Talents.

== Results ==
=== Placements ===
Placement	Contestant
Realmente Bella Señorita Panamá 2008	Panamá Centro – Carolina Dementiev
1st Runner-Up	Herrera – Karina Pinilla
2nd Runner-Up	Los Santos – Estefanía Varela
3rd Runner-Up	Chiriquí – Ginelle Saldaña

=== Special awards ===
Award	Contestant
Representer at Miss World	Kathia Saldaña (Veraguas)
Miss Congeniality	Aurora Cornejo (Colón)
Miss Photogenic	Geraldine Higuera (Panamá Oeste)

== Candidates ==
Province	Contestant	Age	Height	Hometown
Bocas del Toro	Anaís Solís	22	1.70	Ciudad de Panamá
Chiriquí	Ginelle Saldaña	21	1.77	Ciudad de David
Colón	Aurora Cornejo	22	1.67	Colón
Panamá Centro	Carolina Dementiev	19	1.73	Ciudad de Panamá
Panamá Oeste	Geraldine Higuera	19	1.68	Arraiján
Los Santos	Estefanía Varela Ruiz	20	1.75	Ciudad de Panamá
Herrera	Karina Pinilla	23	1.75	Ciudad de Panamá
Coclé	Nallalit González	22	1.70	Ancón
Panamá Este	Mónica Franco	24	1.80	Chepo
Veraguas	Kathia Saldaña	20	1.72	Santiago de Veraguas

== Other notes ==
- Karina Pinilla participated in Miss Supranational 2010 and won the crown in Płock, Poland.
- Geraldine Higuera was elected Miss Earth Panama 2009 and represented Panama in Miss Earth 2009.
- Kathia Saldaña 4th finalist of Realmente Bella 2008, was elected Miss World Panama 2008, but did not compete in Miss World 2008 due to visa problems.
- Ginelle Saldaña participated in the Reinado Internacional del Café 2008, being the 3rd finalist.
