= Eduardo Morales Miranda =

Chilean rector (1910–2012)

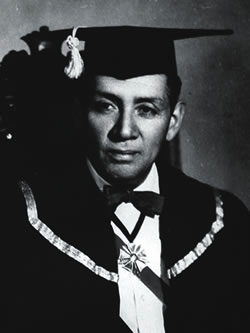
Dr. Eduardo Morales Miranda

Eduardo Morales Miranda (14 November 1910 – 17 November 2012) was one of the founders of Universidad Austral de Chile, and its first rector. He was born to Abdón Morales and Amelia Miranda, who lived in Constitución, Maule Region, Chile. Morales went to high school in Liceo Manuel Blanco Encalada in Talca, and went on later to study medicine in Universidad de Chile, where he became a physician. In 1954 he was elected President of the Directory of Members of the newly created Universidad Austral de Chile. He was elected rector of the university the same year and stayed in that position until 1961 when he renounced. He turned 100 in November 2010.
