= Leonora Jiménez =

- Born: Leonora Jiménez Monge; 17 January 1983 (age 43); Santa Ana
- Occupations: Model, Activist, conservationist, pro diversity

Leonora Jiménez Monge (born 1983 in Santa Ana, Costa Rica) is a Costa Rican beauty pageant titleholder and the original winner of 2005 Miss Asia Pacific International. She was dethroned because of her participation in Miss World 2005 and the Miss Asia Pacific title was passed to the 1st runner up, Evgeniya Lapova of Russia. Leonora did not place among the semifinalists in Miss World.

During 2007 she began making promos for the product she created, Vita Fitness, as well as a TV show called Vita Fitness: El Desafío (Vita Fitness: The Challenge). It featured one group of people exercising and another group taking Vita Fitness pills so they could show that Vita Fitness did work. She also appeared in a promo campaign for the product "Veet", and in 2008 she released the second cycle for the Latin American version for America's Next Top Model, Supermodel Centroamérica. She has done photo shoots for Loeve and Chanel. Has Mia posed for the magazine, Elle and Telva. She was a presenter at the 2011 of Miss Costa Rica the same year.

She has worked with major national (of Costa Rica) brands and designers and international as Matilde Cano, Custo Barcelona, Dior, On Aura Tout Vu, Tiffi, Dolce & Gabbana suramerica, accessories Lavin, Guishem, Daniel Moreira, Marcelle Desanti, MNG, Guayaberi, among others.

In 2013 along with her brother Andrés Jiménez Monge, a wildlife biologist and activist, she spearheaded the campaign "Salvemos Nuestros Mares" that successfully lead to the banning of shrimp trawling in Costa Rica and the acknowledgement by President Laura Chinchilla on the need to refurbish Costa Rican fisheries. Organizations like Marviva, Pretoma, Fecop, The Leatherbacktrust, International Student Volunteers, UESPRA and Widecast formed the coalition called "Frente por Nuestros Mares" to advocate for the change in fisheries policies in the country.

== Mercedes-Benz Fashion Week Costa Rica ==
Leonora Jimenez was also the director of Mercedes-Benz Fashion Week San Jose, event that was held during several editions up until 2020.

== Special Awards in Miss Asia Pacific International 2005 ==
- Best in National Costume
- Best in Swimsuit

== Television & promos ==
- Super Model Centroamérica (2007)
- Vita Fitness (Product Promo Announce) (Aired During2007/2008)
- Vita Fitness: Vita Desafío (Promo TV Show For Vita Fitness) (2007)
- Veet Promo Announce (Aired During 2007/2008)
- Super Model Centroamérica, Cycle 2 (2008)
- Presenter Miss Costa Rica 2011.
- Promotes reading by announcing (I invite you to read with me) shown on Channel 13 (of Costa Rica) in 2013
- Participate in an ad against child labor, along with presenter Patricia Figueroa, Natalia Carvajal and other public figures to Costa Rica.

Preceded by Tatyana Nikitina	Miss Asia Pacific International; 2005 (relinquished title)	Succeeded by Yevgeniya Lapova
