= Miss Earth Nicaragua =

National beauty pageant in Nicaragua

- Type: Women's beauty pageant
- Headquarters: Managua
- Country represented: Nicaragua
- Qualifies for: Miss Earth
- First edition: 2001
- Most recent edition: 2026
- Last edition: 2026
- Current titleholder: Ziari Ruiz; Chinandega
- National Directors: Jennifer Orozco; Piortr Molesta
- Language: Spanish
- Predecessor: Miss Nicaragua

Miss Earth Nicaragua is a national beauty pageant that selects Nicaraguan representatives for Miss Earth. Nicaragua appeared at the first Miss Earth in 2001, and competed for the last time in 2012.

== International representatives ==
=== Miss Earth ===
Color key

- : Declared as winner
- : Ended as runner-up or top 5/6 qualification
- : Ended as one of the finalists/semi-finalists
- : Unplaced but given special award(s)

Year	Delegate	State	Placement & Performance	
Year	Delegate	State	Placements	Special award(s)
2026	Ziari Ruiz	Chinandega	TBA	
2025	Solange Velásquez	Chinandega	Unplaced	Green Leaders in Action Silver Winner
No competition held between 2013—2024
2012	Braxis Álvarez	Río San Juan	Unplaced	
2011	No competition held			
2010	Junieth Raquel Rosales	Managua	Unplaced	Top 5 at Miss Aodai
2009	No competition held			
2008	Thelma Rodríguez	Chinandega	Unplaced	
2007	Iva Grijalva	Bulgaria	Unplaced	
2006	Sharon Amador	Matagalpa	Unplaced	
2005	Sandra Maritza Ríos	León	Unplaced	
2004	Marifely Argüello César	Managua	Top 16	
2003	Marynes Argüello César	Managua	Unplaced	
2002	Yahoska María Cerda	Carazo	Unplaced	
2001	Karla José Leclair	Matagalpa	Unplaced	
