= Estudios Filológicos =

- Discipline: Linguistics, literature
- Language: English, Spanish

Publication details
- History: 2010–present
- Publisher: Southern University of Chile (Chile)
- Frequency: Biannual

Standard abbreviations
- ISO 4: Estud. Filol.

Indexing
- ISSN: 0071-1713 (print); 0717-6171 (web)
- OCLC no.: 473758173

Links
- Journal homepage

Estudios Filológicos is an academic journal published by the Humanities and Philosophy Faculty of the Southern University of Chile. It covers a wide range of linguistics and literature-related topics, primarily on issues that are relevant to Iberoamerica.

== Abstracting and indexing ==
The journal is abstracted and indexed in Current Contents/Arts and Humanities, Current Contents/Social & Behavioral Sciences, Arts and Humanities Citation Index, Social Sciences Citation Index, Linguistics and Language Behavior Abstracts, MLA International Bibliography, International Bibliography of Periodical Literature, and International Bibliography of Book Reviews.
