= Chan-Chan =

Archaeological site and beach in Chile

Chan-Chan is an archaeological site and beach on the coast of the commune of Mehuín in southern Chile. Chan-Chan is known to have been inhabited by hunter-gatherers during two periods of the Middle Archaic, separated by a hiatus. One period spans from 6420 to 6250 BP and the other from 6130 to 5730 BP.

The beach of Chan-Chan extends on the north to Huezhui tombolo and on the south to a peninsula. The archaeological site itself is located above the beach, on a coastal terrace, that was formed by sediments of allochthonous (exotic) and autochthonous (local) origin. The allochthonous material consist of volcanic rocks as well as retransportated mollusc shells. The autochthonous material is chiefly made of sands, gravel and peat.

After examining several artifacts found on the coast of the Valdivia and Concepción areas, archaeologist Menghin claimed the findings belong to a "Chanchaense Complex" or culture extending from Quiriquina Island (37° S) in the north to Tierra del Fuego (55° S) in the south. The inhabitants of Chan-Chan had access to a substantial diversity of rocks, with schists, basalt, quartz and chert being found close to or at the archaeological site. The inhabitants of Chan-Chan had even grey obsidian from Chaitén Volcano, located 400 km south of Chan-Chan. As of 2005, 3484 stone handcrafts and 12,050 carve outs have been found in Chan-Chan as well as bones from mammals, birds and fishes apart from middens of marine invertebrate shells.

The superficial layers of the Chan-Chan site were washed by the tsunami that followed the 1960 Valdivia earthquake, which produced waves of 12 to 15 meters. These waves possibly emplaced some disc-shaped cobbles in the terrace of Chan-Chan. The same kind of disc-shaped cobbles are found in the lower layers of human occupation in Chan-Chan, as well, leaving open the possibility that they were deposited by an ancient tsunami, according to Pino and Navarro.
