= Museo Arqueológico de Santiago =

Coordinates: 33°26′17″S 70°38′27″W

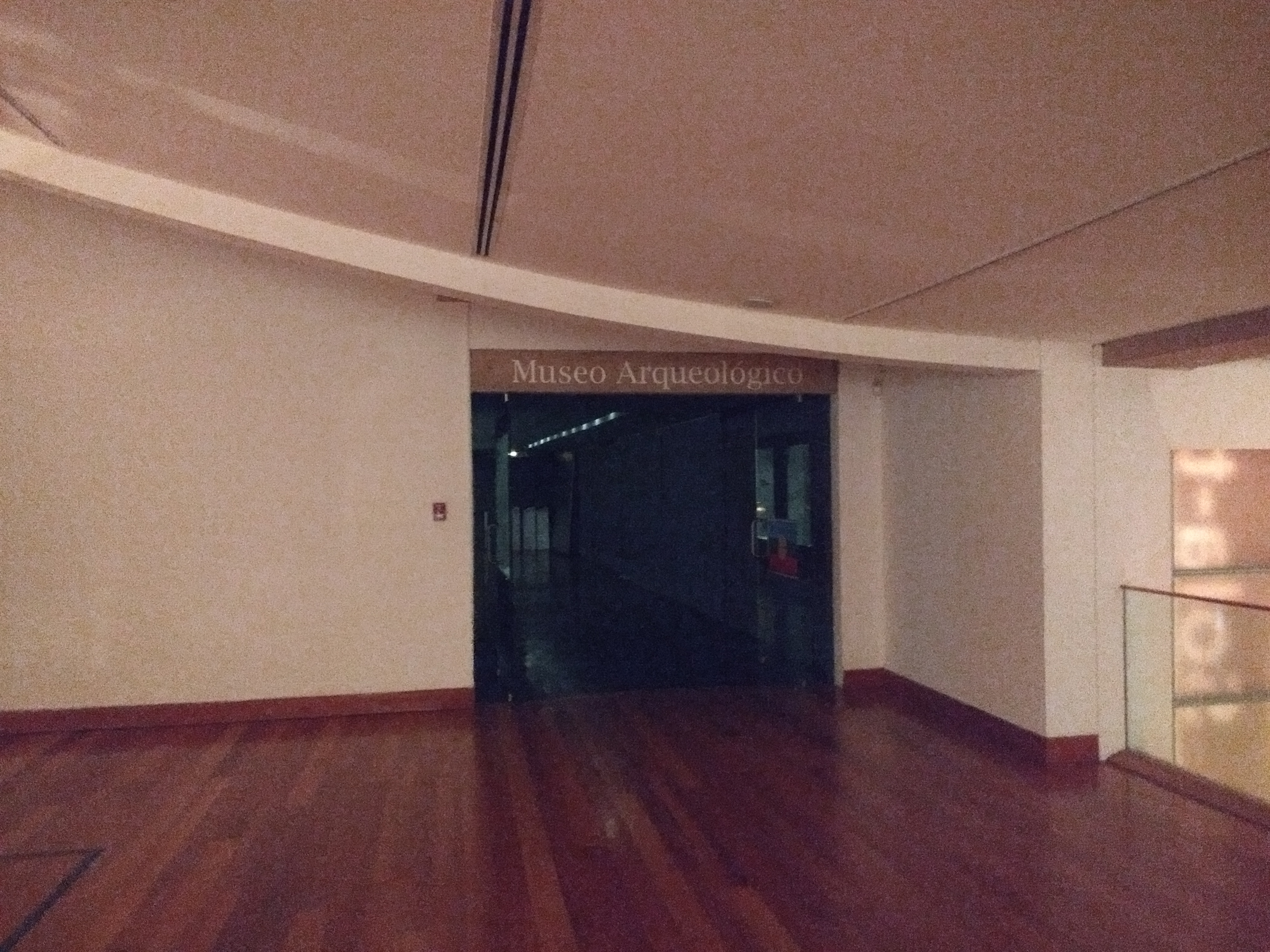
Entrance

Museo Arqueologico de Santiago (English: Archaeological Museum of Santiago) is an archaeology museum located in the Plaza Mulato Gil de Castro area of Santiago, Chile. The museum features cultural objects such as clothing, hats, jewellery and baskets from Chile, dating as far back as 1000 BC.
