= Panama Blue =

Spring water brand

Logo of the Company

Panama Blue is rainforest spring water and a product of Panama Springs S.A.

== Sources ==
Panama Blue is bottled at a source in the mountains of Cerro Azul, surrounded by the Chagres National Park in the Panamanian rainforest. The spring is located about 800m above sea level.

== Rainfall in Panama ==
The annual precipitation in the mountains of Panama can reach up to 3000mm. This rain gets collected in a natural aquifer, where it accumulates minerals.

== Company ==
=== Owner ===
According to official records Panama Springs S.A. is owned by Ulrich Schwark a former commercial banker. He is the biggest German employer in Panama. Panama Springs S.A. is a subsidiary of the Two Oceans Group.

=== Overseas ===
Panama Springs S.A. was the first water brand of Panama exporting to the United States. Today Panama Blue is only sold in Panama. To advertise itself overseas, Panama Springs S.A. sponsored the International Tourism Fair (ITB) at the Hotel Adlon Kempinski Berlin in 2014.
