= Museo Histórico y Antropológico Maurice van de Maele =

Coordinates: 39°48′47″S 73°15′03″W

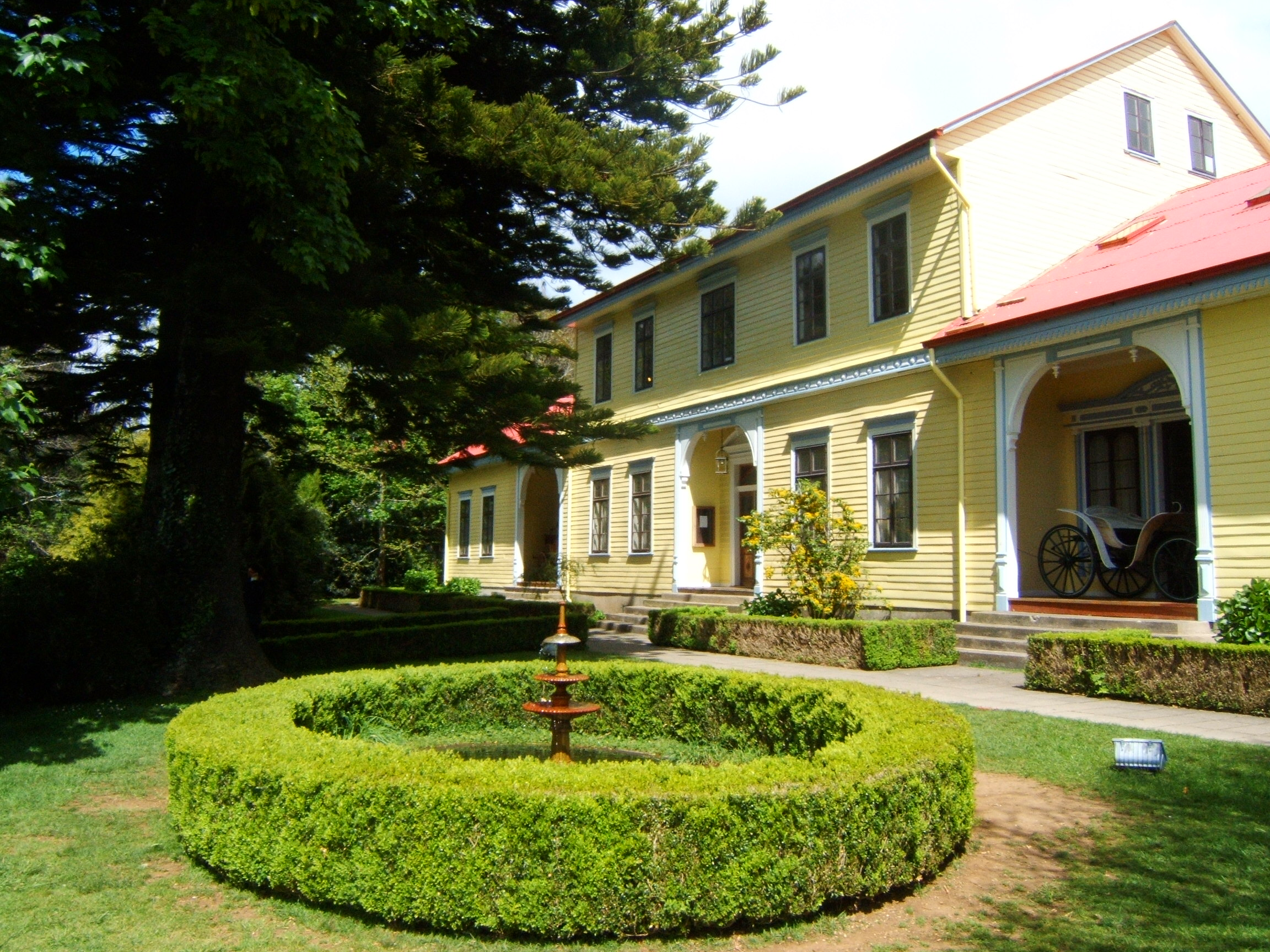
- Established: 1994
- Location: Avenida Los Laureles, Isla Teja, Valdivia
- Director: Leonor Adán
- Website: Museo Histórico y Antropológico Maurice van de Maele

Museo Histórico y Antropológico Maurice van de Maele or (Spanish for Historical and Anthropologic Museum Maurice van de Maele) is an anthropology and history museum in Valdivia run by Universidad Austral de Chile. The exhibitions at the museum deals with Mapuche and Huilliche culture and the German colonization of southern Chile. The museums exhibits collections of archaeological artifacts and also tools, toys, jewelry, textiles, ceramics and photo collection. The museum is named after Maurice van de Maele a Belgian amateur journalist, archaeologist and anthropologist who worked in Universidad Austral.
