= Juan Francisco Salazar =

Chilean anthropologist and filmmaker (born 1971)

Juan Francisco Salazar (born Santiago, 1971) is a Chilean anthropologist and filmmaker. He has lived in Sydney, Australia since 1998. He is professor of media studies at the School of Humanities and Communication Arts and Fellow of the Institute for Culture and Society (ICS). From 2020 he is an Australian Research Council Future Fellow. He is the Interim Director of the Institute for Culture and Society (ICS) at Western Sydney University.

His work on Indigenous media in Latin America was widely recognised for its novel focus on the poetics of Indigenous video practices and for bringing together Latin American film theory and communication theory, with media anthropology. His current research interests are on social ecological change, anthropology of futures, scientific practices in extreme environments, and environmental justice in community based adaptation to climate change. His current work has focused on cultural research on Antarctica where he has developed pioneering ethnographic work since 2011. His latest work is on social studies of outer space. Among his most known films as director are De la Tierra a la Pantalla (2004); Nightfall on Gaia (2015) and The Bamboo Bridge (2019).

His recent work focuses on Antarctica where he has developed pioneering ethnographic work since 2011. In 2015 he completed the feature length speculative documentary Nightfall on Gaia shot entirely in Antarctica and which had its international premiere at the 14th RAI International Festival of Ethnographic Film (Bristol, June 2015).

== Selected publications ==
Salazar, J.F. Kearns, M., Granjou, C., Krzywoszynska, A., and M. Tironi (Eds.) Thinking with Soils: Material Politics and Social Theory. (forthcoming 2020, under contract with Bloomsbury).

Pertierra, A., and Salazar, J.F. (Eds.) Media Cultures in Latin America: Key Concepts and New Debates (Forthcoming 2019, under contract with Routledge).

Salazar, J.F., S. Pink, A. Irving & J. Sjöberg (Eds.) (2017) Anthropologies and Futures: researching uncertain and emerging worlds. London and New York: Bloomsbury.

Granjou, C., J. Walker & J.F. Salazar (2017) “Politics of Anticipation: On Knowing and Governing Environmental Futures”. Futures: The journal of policy, planning and futures studies.

Praet, I., & J.F. Salazar (2017) “Familiarizing the Extraterrestrial / Making Our Planet Alien. Environmental Humanities”, Vol. 9 (2).

Pink, S. and Salazar, J.F., 2017. Anthropologies and futures: Setting the agenda. In Salazar, J.F., S. Pink, A. Irving & J. Sjöberg Anthropologies and Futures: researching uncertain and emerging worlds. London: Bloomsbury

== Other works ==
- De la Tierra a la Pantalla/From Land to Screen (2004), produced in collaboration with Jeannette Paillan; a video about Mapuche communication rights activists.

Exhibited at

- 8th CLACPI Film Festival (Chile, June, 2004),
- Museo de las Americas, Denver, CO, USA (September 2005)
- 13th NMAI Film festival (New York, December 2006)
- Latin American Environmental Media Festival (New Orleans, April 2007)
- 17th Presence Autochtone Film Festival (Montreal, June 2007)
- Anatomia Monumental(1999) / with Ismael Frigerio and Felipe Zavala. Museo Nacional de Bellas Artes, Santiago, Chile. Museo de Arte Contemporaneo, Valdivia, Chile.

He is also author of the book Screen Media Arts: Introduction to Concepts and Practices, co-written with Hart Cohen and Iqbal Barkat. Oxford University Press, 2009.
