= Mario Pino Quivira =

Chilean geologist

Mario Pino Quivira is a Chilean geologist specialized in geoarchaeology and sedimentology that has been involved in several studies of early human settlements in Southern Chile. After Tom Dillehay's excavation of Monte Verde near Puerto Montt, where human remains estimated to be about 15,000 years old have been found, challenging the Clovis theory of the first human arrival in the Americas, Pino claimed a lower layer of the site is 33,200 years old, based on the discovery of burned wood several hundred feet to the south of Monte Verde. Radiocarbon dating established the wood as 33,000 years old. However, the claim remains controversial. Other studied sites includes the Chan-Chan settlement near Mehuín and the Gomphotherium of Osorno.
