= Museo de Arte Sagrado =

Coordinates: 33.43862°S 70.65129°W

The Museo de Arte Sagrado (English: Museum of Sacred Art) is a religious art museum located in Santiago, Chile. The museum is located behind the Santiago Metropolitan Cathedral, and features a courtyard and colonial architecture. The museum features a collection of Jesuit silverware and religious paintings, sculpture, and furniture.
