= Diana Broce =

Panamanian model (born 1986)

- Born: Diana Patricia Broce Bravo; July 28, 1986 (age 40); Los Santos, Panama
- Height: 5 ft 7 in (1.70 m)
- Beauty pageant titleholder
- Title: Miss Panama Universe 2009 (winner)
- Hair color: Black
- Eye color: Black
- Major competition: Miss Universe 2009(Best National Costume of Miss Universe 2009)

Diana Patricia Broce Bravo (born 28 July 1986) (Las Tablas, Los Santos) is a Panamanian model and beauty pageant titleholder.

She represented Panama at the 58th Miss Universe 2009.

Awards and achievements
Preceded by Carolina Dementiev	Miss Panama; 2009	Succeeded by Anyolí Ábrego
