= Museo de Arte Contemporáneo Valdivia =

Museum in Valdivia, Chile

Museo de Arte Contemporáneo
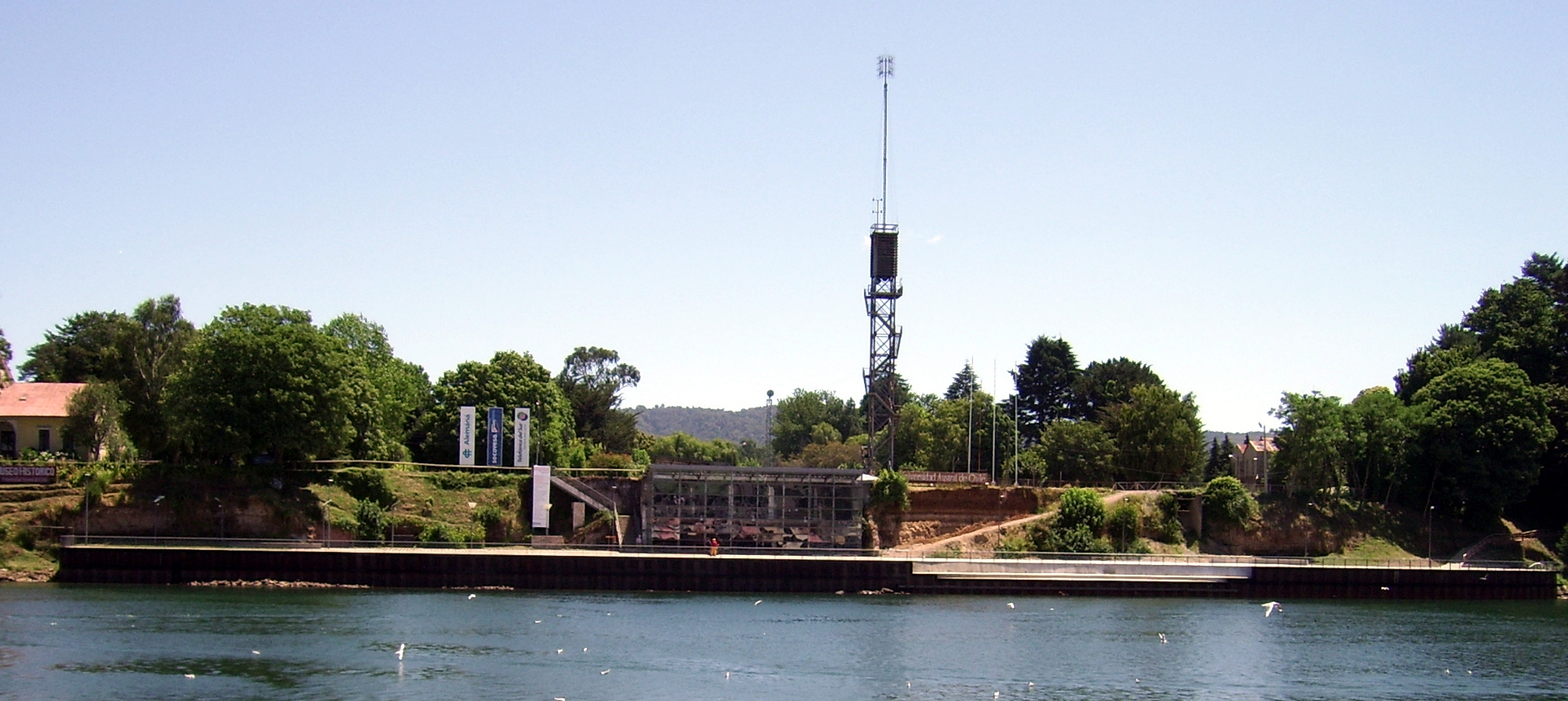
- Established: 1994
- Location: Avenida Los Laureles, Isla Teja, Valdivia
- Coordinates: 39.8125°S 73.2505°W
- Director: Hernán Miranda
- Website: macvaldivia.uach.org

Museo de Arte Contemporáneo or MAC (Spanish for Museum of Contemporary Art) is a modern art museum in Valdivia run by Universidad Austral de Chile. It was founded in 1994 by the then rector of Universidad Austral Manfred Max-Neef and the artist Hernán Miranda. Artists that have had exhibitions at MAC include: Nicanor Parra and Juan Francisco Salazar. MAC was built in the same site of the old Anwandter Brewery that collapsed during the 1960 Valdivia earthquake.
