= Santiago Railway Museum =

- Museo Ferroviario de Santiago

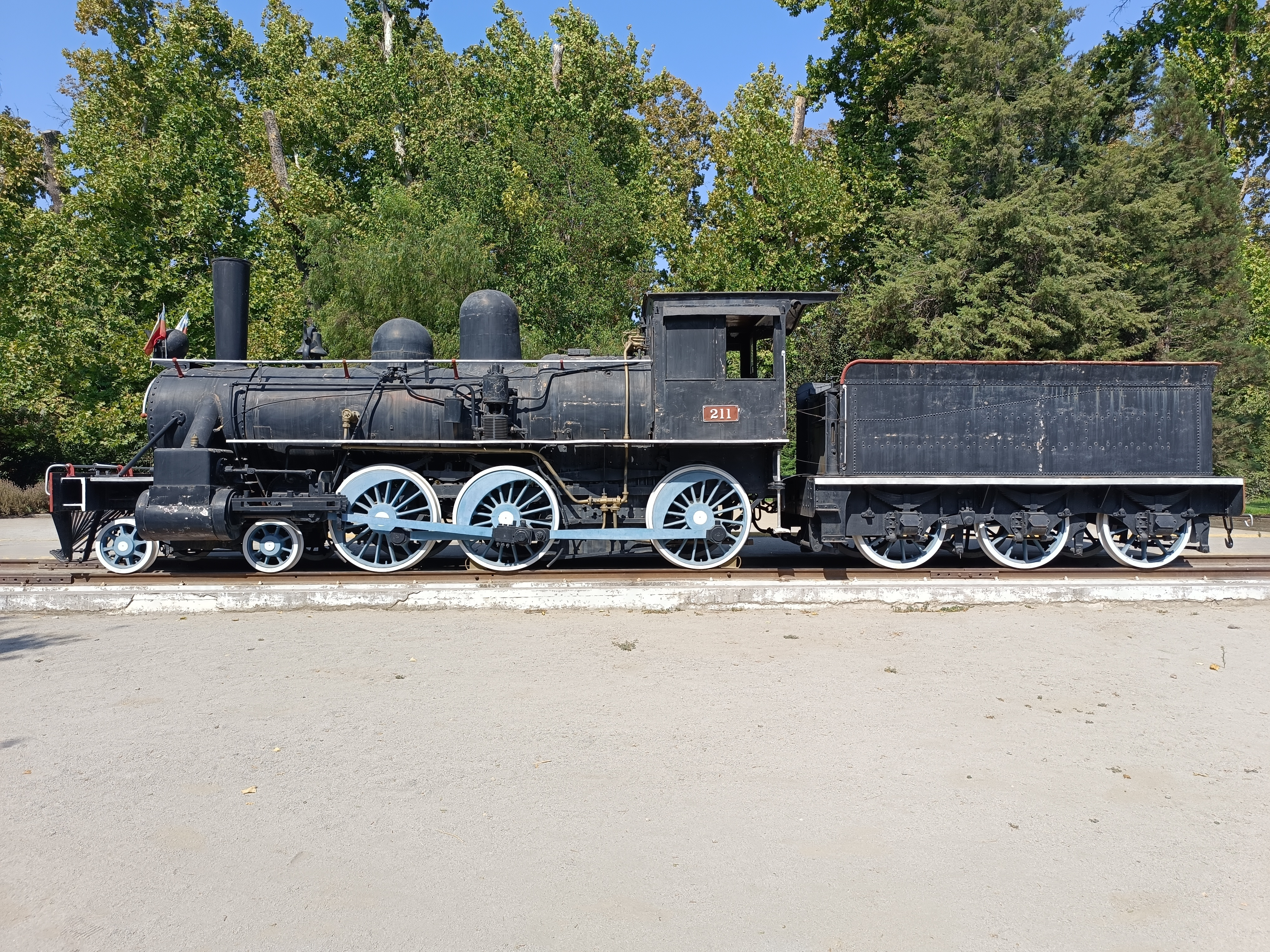
- Steam locomotive manufactured by Rogers in 1896
- Established: 1984
- Location: Quinta Normal Park, Santiago, Chile
- Coordinates: 33°26′35″S 70°41′07″W
- Type: Railway Museum
- Collection size: 20
- Public transit access: Quinta Normal Metro Station
- Website: https://www.corpdicyt.cl/mferroviario

The Santiago Railway Museum (Spanish: Museo Ferroviario de Santiago) is the railway museum of the city of Santiago, located on the Quinta Normal Park, in the capital of Chile.

== History ==
In 1980, the Santiago Municipality and the Chilean Rail Company EFE signed an agreement to build a rail museum in the Quinta Normal Park. As part of the agreement, EFE ceded multiple historical steam locomotives. Four years later, in 1984, the museum was inaugurated to the public. The museum currently counts has 16 locomotives and 4 passenger cars.

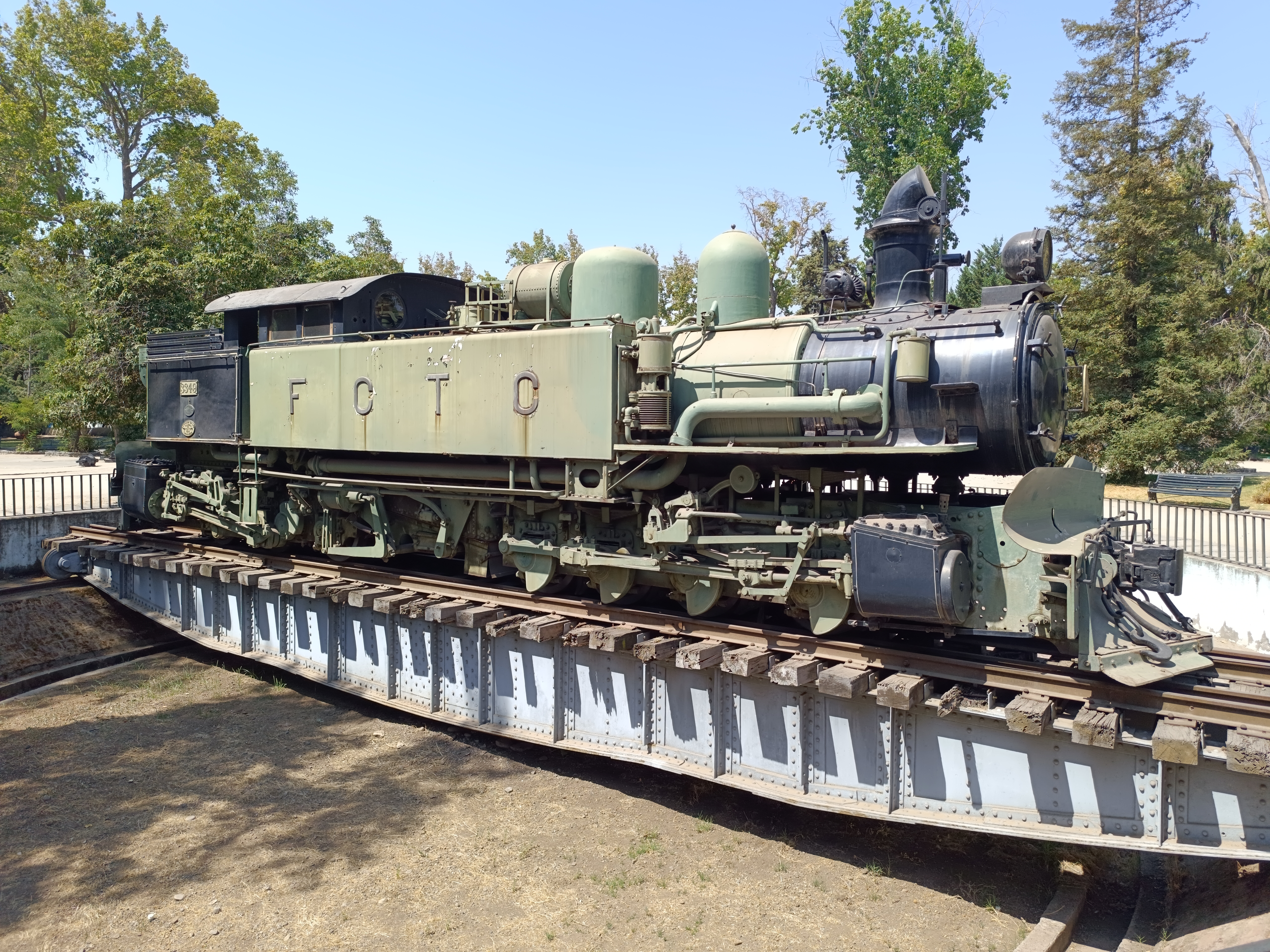
Kitson-Meyer 3349, year 1909, preserved in the Santiago Railway Museum.

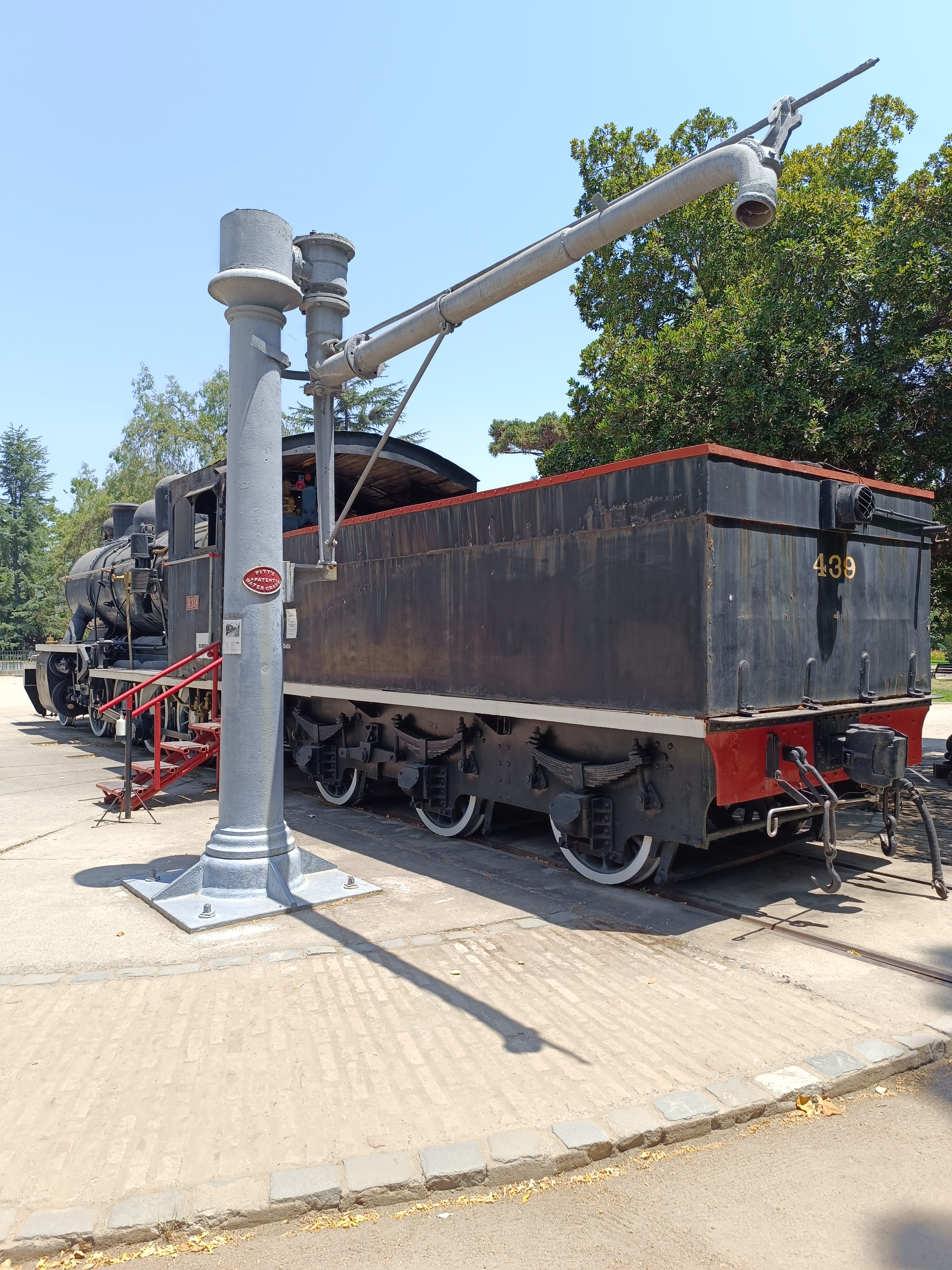
Water crane. Stothert & Pitt, Bath, 1875. Santiago Railway Museum.
