= Historical Museum and Cultural Center of the Carabineros de Chile =

Police museum in Chile

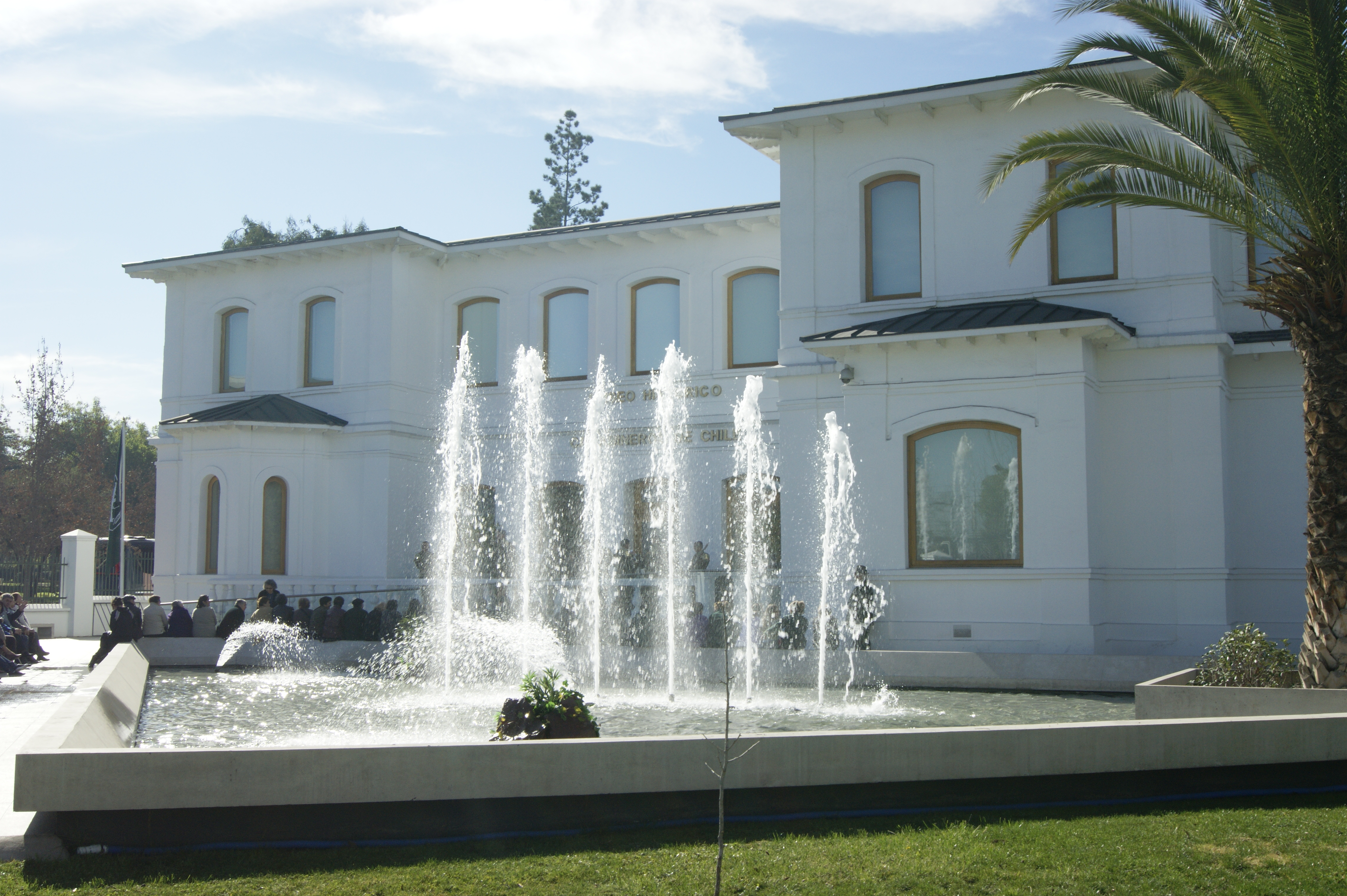
- Exterior view
- Interactive fullscreen map
- Established: 1958; 68 years ago
- Location: Antonio Varas 1690, Providencia, Región Metropolitana, Chile
- Coordinates: 33°26′34.34″S 70°36′42″W
- Director: Coronel Patricio Duguett Aroca
- Website: www.museocarabineros.cl

The Historical Museum and Cultural Center of the Carabineros de Chile (Spanish: Museo Histórico y Centro Cultural Carabineros de Chile) is a police museum in Providencia, Chile dedicated to the historical heritage of the Carabineros de Chile. It contains various collections related to the history of the police function in Chile, spanning from the arrival of Pedro de Valdivia in the Mapocho Valley to the present day.

== Mission and Vision ==
The mission of the museum is to rescue, preserve, investigate, exhibit, and disseminate the historical heritage corresponding to the police function and the Carabineros de Chile, according to its informal educational agent character, while the vision is defined under the concept of consolidating the Museum at a national level as a reference for the dissemination and registration of the Chilean police function.

== History ==
The museum was created as the Museum and Historical Archive of the Carabineros de Chile (Spanish: Museo y Archivo Histórico de Carabineros de Chile), through General Order 189 of March 17, 1958, by General Director Jorge Ardiles Galdames, with the purpose of preserving documents and objects related to the different police systems or similar organizations that have existed in the country.

It was officially inaugurated on the occasion of the fiftieth anniversary of the Carabineros de Chile on April 29, 1977. After operating in different facilities, it was definitively transferred to the Carabineros del General Carlos Ibáñez del Campo School in 1992, in the old house used by the Directorate of the institution, where it operates until today.

In 2007, due to the Cultural Donations Law, a profound modification was made, both physical and methodological, in the museum, aimed at modernizing the museography and disseminating the history of the evolution of the police function in the country. The building was remodeled by the architect Gonzalo Mardones Viviani, preserving its original structure. During this process, the interior spaces were adapted to fulfill the functions of a museum. Then, it was completely painted white, to connect it with the architectural concept of the Carabineros de Chile Cultural Center.

== Collections ==
- Painting
- Sculpture
- Equipment and accessories
- Phaleristics
- Weapons
- Books and documents
- Textile and clothing
- Vehicles

Some objects stand out in these collections, such as the painting Chilean Carabinero by the renowned national artist Jorge Délano, made in 1953; the Commander Manuel Chacón Garay portrait medallion sculpted by Nicanor Plaza in 1875; the personal belongings of Lieutenant Hernán Merino Correa, who died in Del Desierto Lake in 1965; the silver medals obtained by Captain Óscar Cristi Gallo in the 1952 Helsinki Olympics, and the Popemobile used by John Paul II during his visit to Chile in April 1987.

== Areas of work ==
The museum has six areas of work.

1. Museography
2. Conservation and restoration
3. Historical research
4. Education
5. Communications
6. Documentation Center and Historical Archive

An important audience for the museum is schoolchildren. The museum has a specialized library on historical topics and a documentary and photographic archive related to the history of the police function in Chile. In addition, the museum carries out outreach activities such as itinerant exhibitions, or participation in various national events such as the Day of Cultural Heritage and Midnight Museums.

In the investigative field, the publication of the text Carabineros de Chile, the evolution of the police function, stands out, aimed at all students of the different institutions of the institution. This was followed in 2013 by the first issue of the Historical Museum of the Carabineros de Chile Magazine.

Furthermore, the museum facilitates situations in which learning and social interaction come into play through talks and presentations by the different ranks that make up the Carabineros de Chile in instances such as winter vacation programs.

== Location and hours ==
The Historical Museum and Cultural Center of the Carabineros de Chile is located on the north side of the Carabineros School, at 1690 Antonio Varas Avenue, in the commune of Providencia. Its hours of operation are Tuesday to Thursday from 10:00 to 17:30, Friday from 10:00 to 16:30, and Saturday from 9:00 to 13:00. In addition, it is possible to arrange guided tours, which can be planned from Monday to Friday.

== See also ==
- Carabineros de Chile
