= Giosue Cozzarelli =

Panamanian model

Giosué Cozzarelli
- Born: Giosué Enith Cozzarelli Sanmartín; 17 April 1989 (age 37); Chiriquí Province, Panama
- Height: 1.68 m (5 ft 6 in)
- Beauty pageant titleholder
- Title: Realmente Bella Señorita Panamá 2009 Contestant
- Hair color: light brown
- Eye color: green
- Major competition: Realmente Bella Señorita Panamá 2009

Giosué Enith Cozzarelli Sanmartín (pronounced [kottsaˈrɛlli]), born April 17, 1989, in San Félix, Chiriquí province, is a Panamanian beauty queen, model and YouTube celebrity of Italian descent.

Giosué entered beauty competitions at age 18 when she joined Panama's local preliminary to the Japan-owned Miss International contest.

Afterwards, she was chosen as one of the Top 10 contestants in the reality show Señorita Panamá Realmente Bella, a beauty pageant that selected local winners to represent Panama in the Miss Universe and Miss World competitions.

The format of this reality show was an 8-week boot camp where all contestants had to learn different tasks such as cooking sushi, learn to walk like a geisha, or acting challenges. Each week a contestant would be voted off in special "themed" live televised gala.

== Rise to Stardom ==
On April 17, 2009, during the Asian Themed gala of the Realmente Bella reality show, each contestant had to pick a question from a bowl and answer it. This week the questions were related to Chinese ancient history. Giosué was asked to "Explain the following quote by Confucius: Reading without meditating is a useless occupation". To what she answered that "Confucius was one of the men who invented confusion. Because of this, he was ... one of the most old was one of the Chinese-Japanese, who was one of the oldest. Thank you."

Her video on the pageant instantly became a YouTube hit, causing all kinds of comments and editorials about beauty queens not being able to think on their feet. The fame caused by this video brought instant fame to Giosué, who was invited to several TV shows in Spain, and other countries as well. She used this situation to become a popular model for commercials and also created a line of clothing.

Preceded by New Title	Miss Panamá All Nations; 2010-2011	Succeeded by Incumbent
