= Museo de la Exploración Rudolph Amandus Philippi =

Museum in Valdivia, Chile

Coordinates: 39.81334°S 73.25172°W

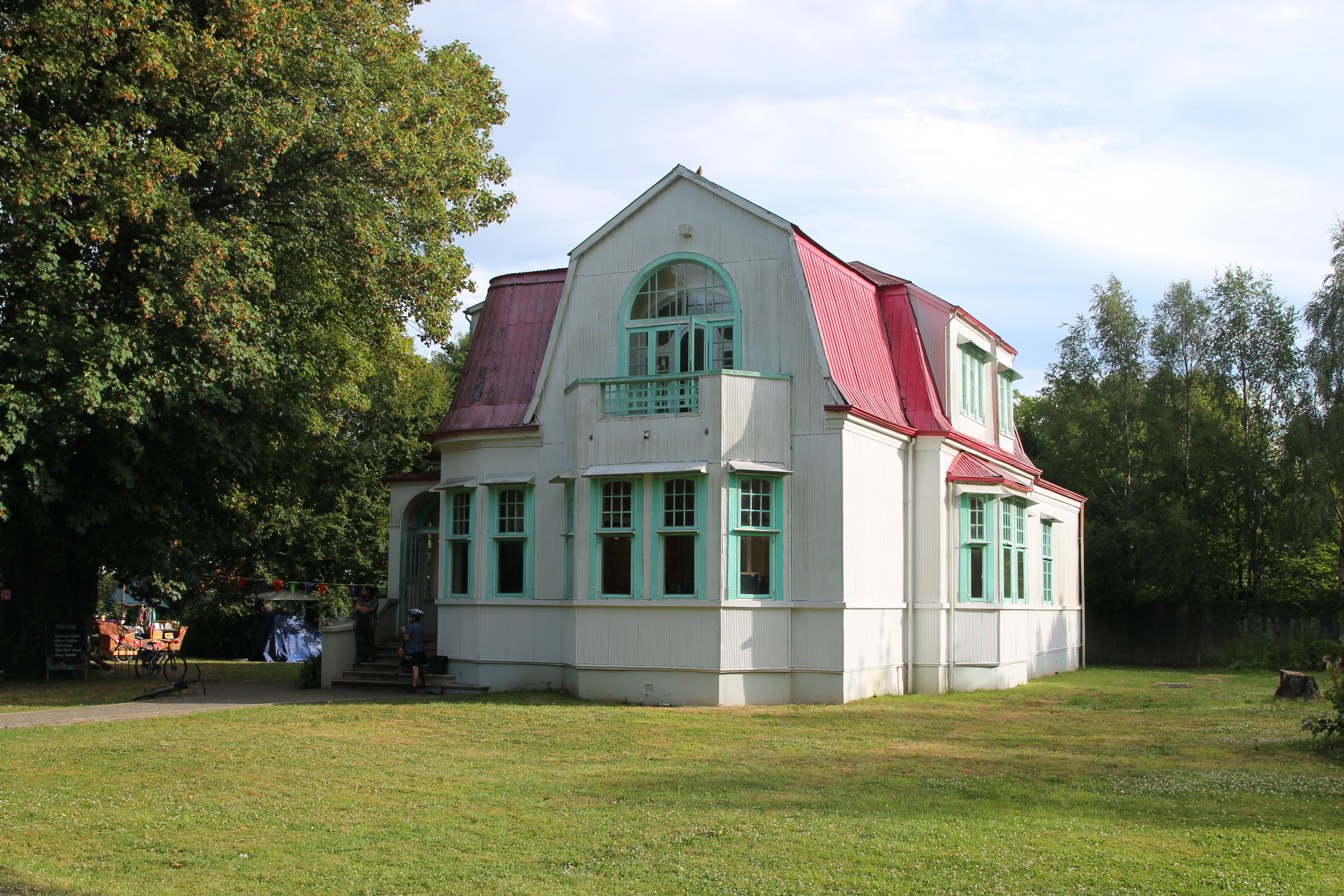
- Established: 2006
- Location: Avenida Los Laureles, Isla Teja, Valdivia
- Director: Karin Weil
- Website: www.uach.cl/direccion/museologica/

Museo de la Exploración Rudolph Amandus Philippi (Spanish for Museum of the Exploration Rudolph Amandus Philippi) is a museum in Valdivia run by Austral University of Chile. The exhibitions at the museum deals with the exploration of southern Chile, specially those made by the German naturalist Rodolfo Amando Philippi.
