= Juan Camilo Salazar (footballer, born 1998) =

Colombian footballer

Personal information
- Full name: Juan Camilo Salazar López
- Date of birth: 28 February 1998 (age 28)
- Place of birth: Palmira, Colombia
- Position: Forward

Team information
- Current team: Boyacá Chicó

Senior career*
Years	Team	Apps	(Gls)
2018–	Boyacá Chicó	3	(1)
- * Club domestic league appearances and goals as of 00:09, 3 February 2019 (UTC)

Juan Camilo Salazar López (born 28 February 1998) is a Colombian professional footballer who plays as a forward for Boyacá Chicó.

== Career ==
Salazar's career started in Categoría Primera A with Boyacá Chicó. He made three appearances, notably for his debut versus Patriotas, throughout the 2018 season, which culminated with him netting his first professional goal on 9 November during a 2–2 draw against Atlético Huila; though the season ended with relegation.

== Career statistics ==
As of 3 February 2019.

Club statistics
Club	Season	League			Cup		Continental		Other		Total	
Club	Season	Division	Apps	Goals	Apps	Goals	Apps	Goals	Apps	Goals	Apps	Goals
Boyacá Chicó	2018	Categoría Primera A	3	1	0	0	—		0	0	3	1
Boyacá Chicó	2019	Categoría Primera B	0	0	0	0	—		0	0	0	0
Career total			3	1	0	0	—		0	0	3	1
