= Chilean National Museum of Natural History =

Coordinates: 33°26′32″S 70°40′55″W

- Museo Nacional de Historia Natural Chile
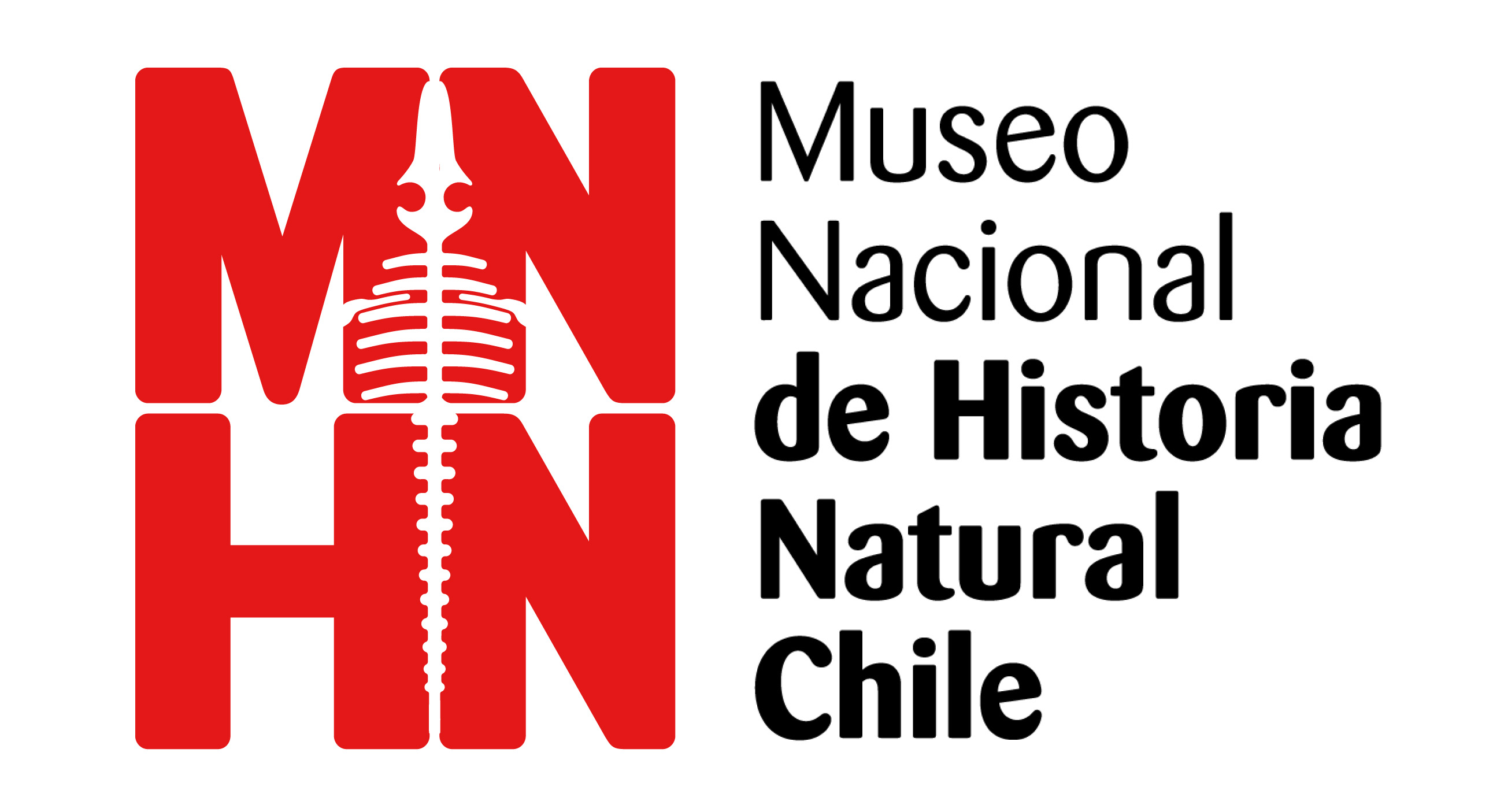

- Established: 1830
- Location: Santiago, Chile
- Type: Natural history museum
- Website: mnhn.gob.cl

The Chilean National Museum of Natural History (Spanish: Museo Nacional de Historia Natural or MNHN) is one of three national museums in Chile, along with the Museum of Fine Arts and the National History Museum. It is located in Quinta Normal Park, and was founded in 1830 by the French naturalist Claudio Gay.

== History ==
The museum is one of the oldest natural history museums in South America. It was founded on September 14, 1830 by the French naturalist Claudio Gay, commissioned by the Chilean government. Its first director was another Frenchman Jean-François Dauxion-Lavaysse. Its original mandate was the biology and geography of Chile, with a concentration on crops and mineral resources. The existing museum building was constructed in 1875 as a palace, or pavilion, for the Chilean International Exhibition.

In 1889 departments of botany, zoology, and mineralogy were established. The National Museum Bulletin (Boletín del Museo Nacional) was first published in 1908, and continues under the title Bulletin of the National Museum of Natural History (Boletín del Museo Nacional de Historia Natural).

Earthquakes in August 1906 and April 1927 damaged the museum. In 2010 an earthquake damaged seriously the museum, leaving it closed until 2012, and since only the first floor is available, while the second floor still waits for repairs.

== Exhibits and collections ==
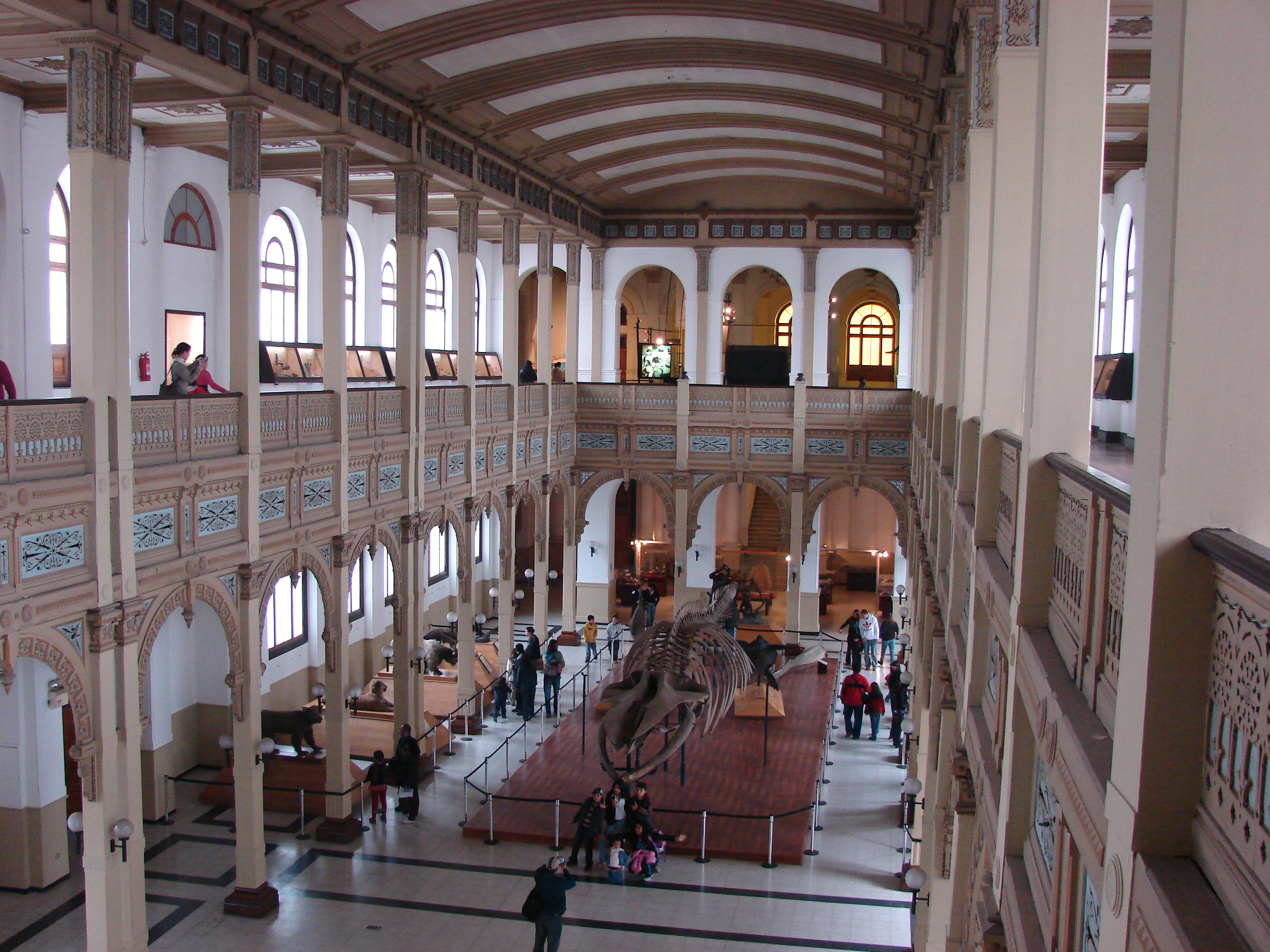
The central hall, with a sei whale skeleton

The museum has twelve permanent exhibits:

- Biogeography of Chile, a long tunnel that fills much of the first floor
- Interactive children's games for terrestrial ecosystems
- The Central Hall exhibits, including a 17-meter skeleton of a sei whale
- Minerals, with an emphasis on the nitrate boom of the early twentieth century
- Insects, including large fossil dragonflies
- Mollusks
- Mesozoic era vertebrates, including a specimen of Carnotaurus sastrei
- Chilean timber
- Chilean archaeology
- Juan Fernández Islands
- Cultural anthropology, covering the Aymara, Mapuche, Selkʼnam, Rapanui, Kaweskar, and Yámana. The museum houses the finest public collection of rongorongo artifacts in the world.
- The uses of copper, a collection of Codelco, the state mining corporation

The oldest mummies in the world are held in the museum, around 7400 years old (2000 years older than their Egyptian counterparts). Fifteen of them were subjected to CAT scans in late 2016, with scientists hoping to learn more about the mummification process used by the Chinchorro people of Chile. The 15 mummies had been women and children upon whom different preservation techniques were used.

A collection of molluscs from Chile and other parts of the world is held in the museum. The collection dates to the beginning of the study of the natural history of Chile. Juan I. Molina collected 11 species of molluscs in 1782. French zoologists published studies of the molluscs in Chile in the 1800s. As of 2003, the mollusc collection was being organized and catalogued, including donations and exchanges made by director Philippi until the end of his term in 1897. Geologist Humberto Fuenzalida was director from 1949 to 1963; his tenure was marked by a grand expansion at the museum, with the formation of the malacology laboratory under tutelage of professor Nibaldo Bahamonde.

Marine fossils from the late Miocene and the early Pliocene were quarried from marine sandstone deposits on the north-central coast of Chile in the early 1990s and added to the museum's collection shortly thereafter.

== Departments and oversight ==
The five departments are botany, zoology, entomology, anthropology, and paleontology. The department of botany includes a herbarium of 3700 species dating from 1830. 90% of the type specimens of Chilean species are housed here. The zoology department contains fourteen holotypes, mainly Chilean marine and freshwater fish. The anthropological department emphasizes the archeology of Central Chile through the Inca Empire and cultural artifacts of modern or recently extinct peoples of Chile and Easter Island. One of its duties is the caretaking of the Plomo Mummy.

=== Directors ===
The Museum is supervised by the Director of the National Cultural Heritage Service, itself a division of the Chilean Ministry of Cultures, Arts, and Heritage:

- 1830: Frenchman Jean-François Dauxion-Lavaysse was the first director
- 1853: Geman doctor Rodulfo A. Philippi hired as a naturalist, director and curator
- 1897: Philippi's son Federico Philippi became director
- 1910: Medical doctor Eduardo Moore (until 1927)
- 1928: Civil engineer Ricardo Latcham
- 1943: Naturalist Enrique Gigoux (until 1948)
- 1949: Geologist Humberto Fuenzalida
- 1964: Anthropologist Grete Mostny led the museum until 1982.

== Collections Management ==
The National Museum of Natural History of Chile (MNHN) maintains one of the most extensive scientific collections in the country, encompassing archaeology, anthropology, zoology, botany, geology, and paleontology. The museum follows standardized procedures for the conservation, documentation, and storage of its collections, ensuring long-term preservation and accessibility for research and public heritage.

=== Archaeological Collections ===
The archaeological collections are housed in controlled-environment storage facilities and follow a formal protocol for their entry, classification, and long-term preservation. This protocol establishes minimal requirements for labeling, packaging, documentation, and physical stability before any material can be incorporated into the MNHN’s deposits.

==== Labeling and Object Identification ====
Objects must be labeled according to conservation standards using Paraloid B-72 as a reversible barrier and India ink on stable, non-decorated surfaces. Codes include site, grid, and stratigraphic information (e.g., P211.C6.N11).

==== Packaging Standards ====
Excavated materials are stored in transparent polyethylene bags of regulated thickness, with internal paper or hydrophobic non-woven fabric (known as Tyvek) labels. Fragile materials receive specialized supports. Bags are then placed in double-corrugated cardboard boxes of standardized dimensions, which group materials by context, material type, and excavation unit.

Boxes must display external labels identifying the project, site, context, material type, and container number. Particularly fragile contents are marked accordingly.

=== Bioanthropological Collections ===
The museum maintains a specialized protocol for the storage of mummified, semi-mummified, and skeletal human remains. Each individual receives a custom-made container with ventilation systems, Tyvek linings, Ethafoam supports, and internal trays organized by anatomical unit.

- Mummified and semi-mummified individuals are placed on Tyvek-covered supports with individual coverings and secure anatomical stabilization.
- Skeletal remains are arranged in trays according to standardized anatomical segmentation (e.g., cranium, long bones, vertebrae, small bones), with each bone supported in carved Ethafoam and secured with cotton ties.
- Small associated artifacts are stored in acrylic jars or Tyvek envelopes fixed to the container base.

Each container is labeled externally, and internal diagrams or photographs indicate the distribution of remains within trays. The museum uses an extensive Excel template to record biological profile, burial context, preservation state, cultural attribution, and inventory completeness.

=== Conservation and Storage Conditions ===
Across all disciplines, MNHN's storage facilities incorporate:

- Stable temperature and humidity conditions (according to international museum standards)
- Reversible conservation materials (Tyvek, Ethafoam, archival papers, Paraloid B-72)
- Methods to avoid biological, mechanical, and chemical deterioration
- Segregation of materials by physical and contextual criteria
- Non-metal fasteners and adhesives to prevent corrosion or chemical reactions

The museum continuously updates its conservation strategies to align with current international standards and Chilean heritage regulations.
