= Architecture of Chile =

Chilean architecture is influenced by the country's history, religious culture and unique climate. Chile was a former Spanish colony and its architectural style was therefore strongly influenced by Spanish design. Due to the unique geographical environment, Chilean architecture was also designed to accommodate these natural conditions. In particular, Chile's special geologic structure and resultant high incidence of earthquakes and tsunamis have led to Chilean architects becoming quite experienced in the application of structures and materials for earthquake-resistant structures and post-disaster reconstruction.

== Geographical background ==
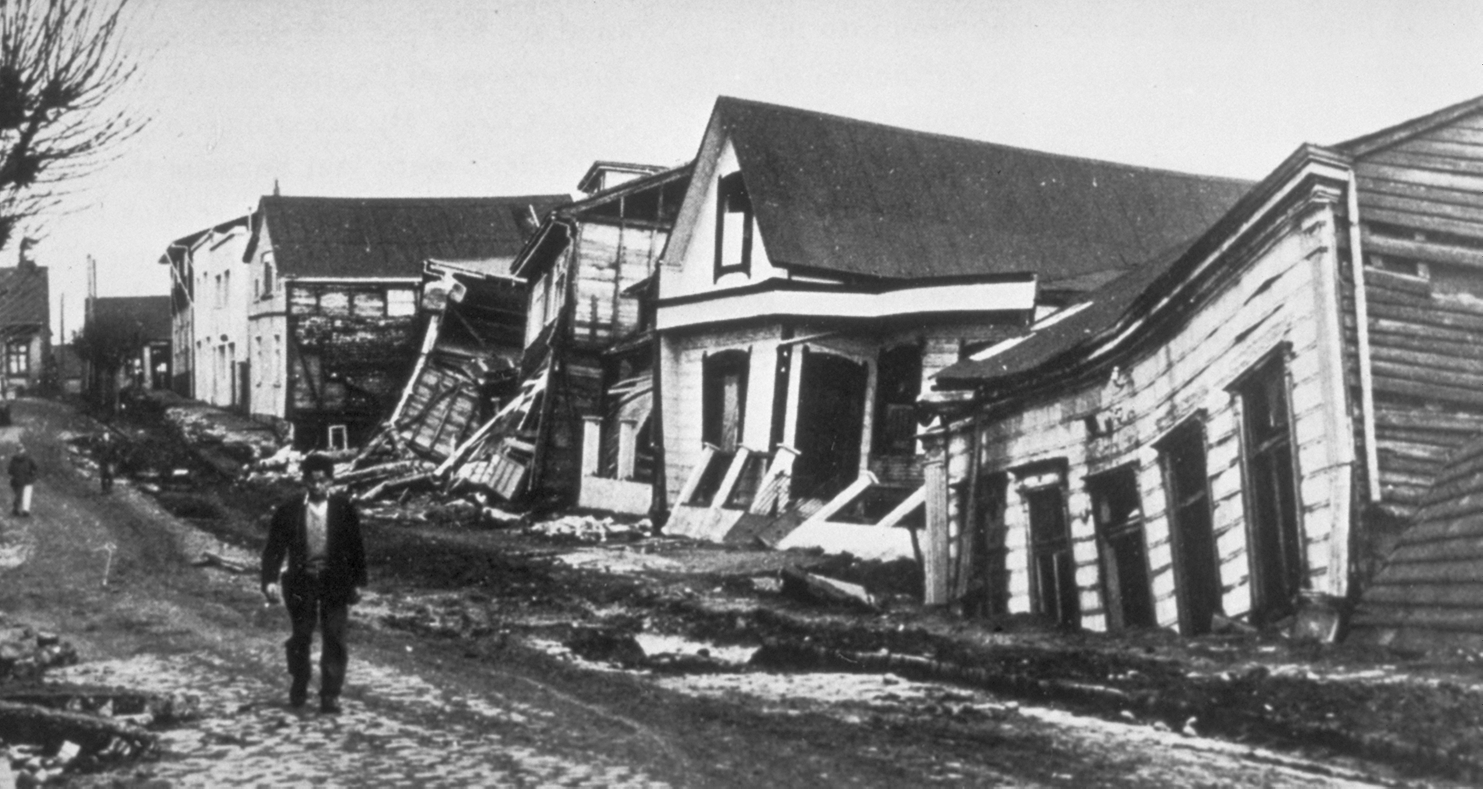
Valdivia after earthquake.

As the narrowest country in the world, Chile has a unique geography. With a 4,270 km (2,650 mi) north–south span, Chile spans 38 latitudes and has 24 world-wide climates. As a result, the Chilean houses and buildings are adapted to suit the natural conditions. In the dry north, materials such as stones, earth and straw are usually used, and the central areas are mainly clay and straw. In the rainy south, tiles and wood are used.

Chile is located on the Pacific Ring of Fire; this special geological structure has resulted in Chile having a remarkably high incidence of earthquakes and tsunamis. This intense earthquake activity constrains the development of urban architecture, so the indigenous houses of the former Latino residents were built with half-timbered and smeared earthen walls (wood structures filled with straw and clay) because these walls are light and flexible. The arrival of Spanish conquistadors in 1541 saw the development of more urban architecture; however, the first colonial buildings they built were highly vulnerable to earthquake activity. As a result, later colonial architecture was modified to be suitable for earthquakes and post-disaster reconstruction.

Chile's building codes require all buildings to survive a 9.0 magnitude earthquake. That is to say, a building may crack, tilt, and even be declared unsuitable for future use after an earthquake, but it cannot collapse. So, in order to meet the government's requirements, the average cost of each building in Chile is higher than in most other countries.

Strong columns and weak beams are widely used in Chilean buildings. They are supported by reinforced concrete columns and are further reinforced by steel frames. Before piling, the construction company will drill holes to measure the wave velocity and calculate the natural frequency of the building, so that the main structure of the building can swing freely with the seismic wave. Its design concept is to buffer and release seismic energy as much as possible, and to maximise the preservation of the building.

== Pre-Columbian period ==
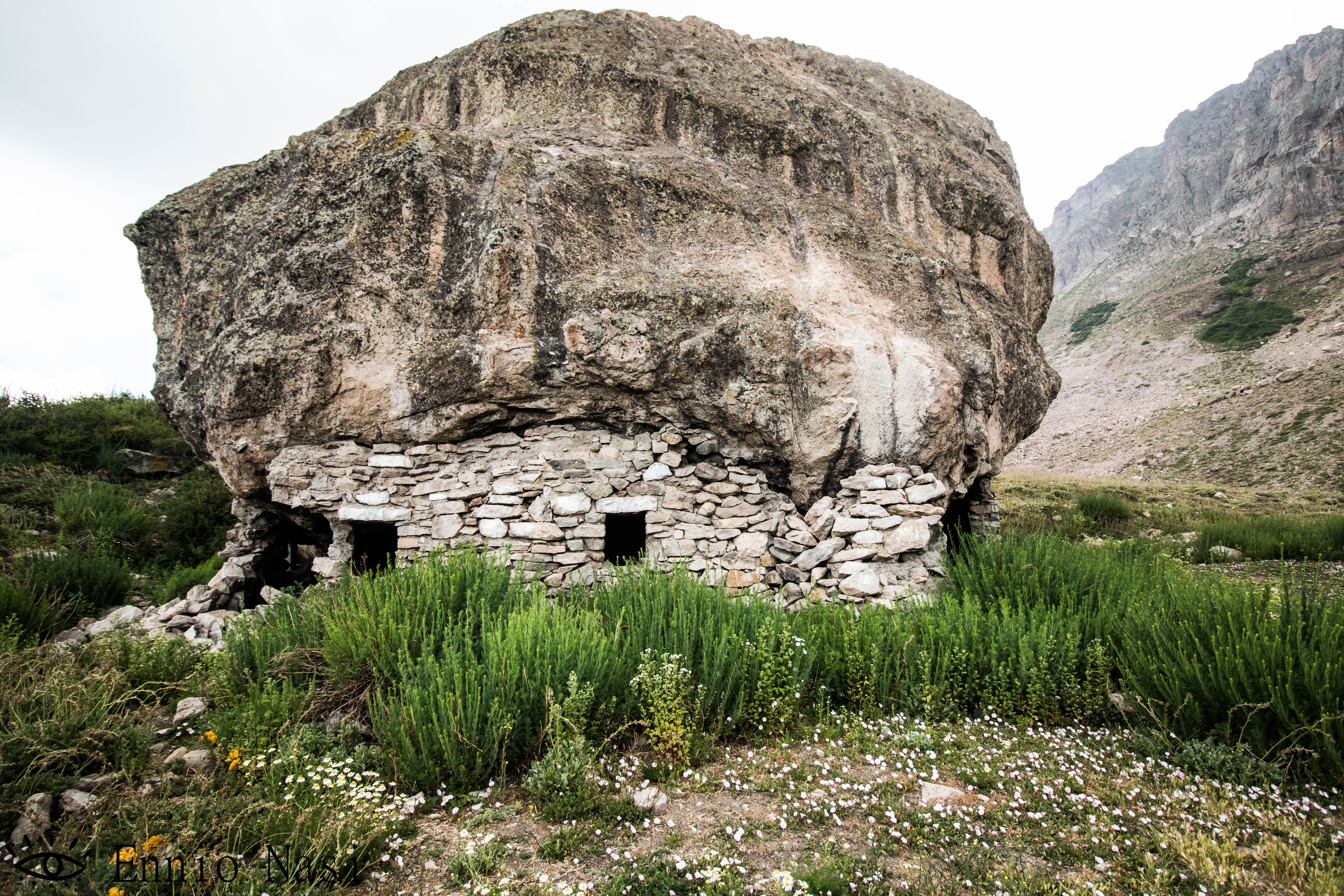
Casa de piedra, attributed to Aconcagua culture, located in Farellones, Metropolitana de Santiago Region.

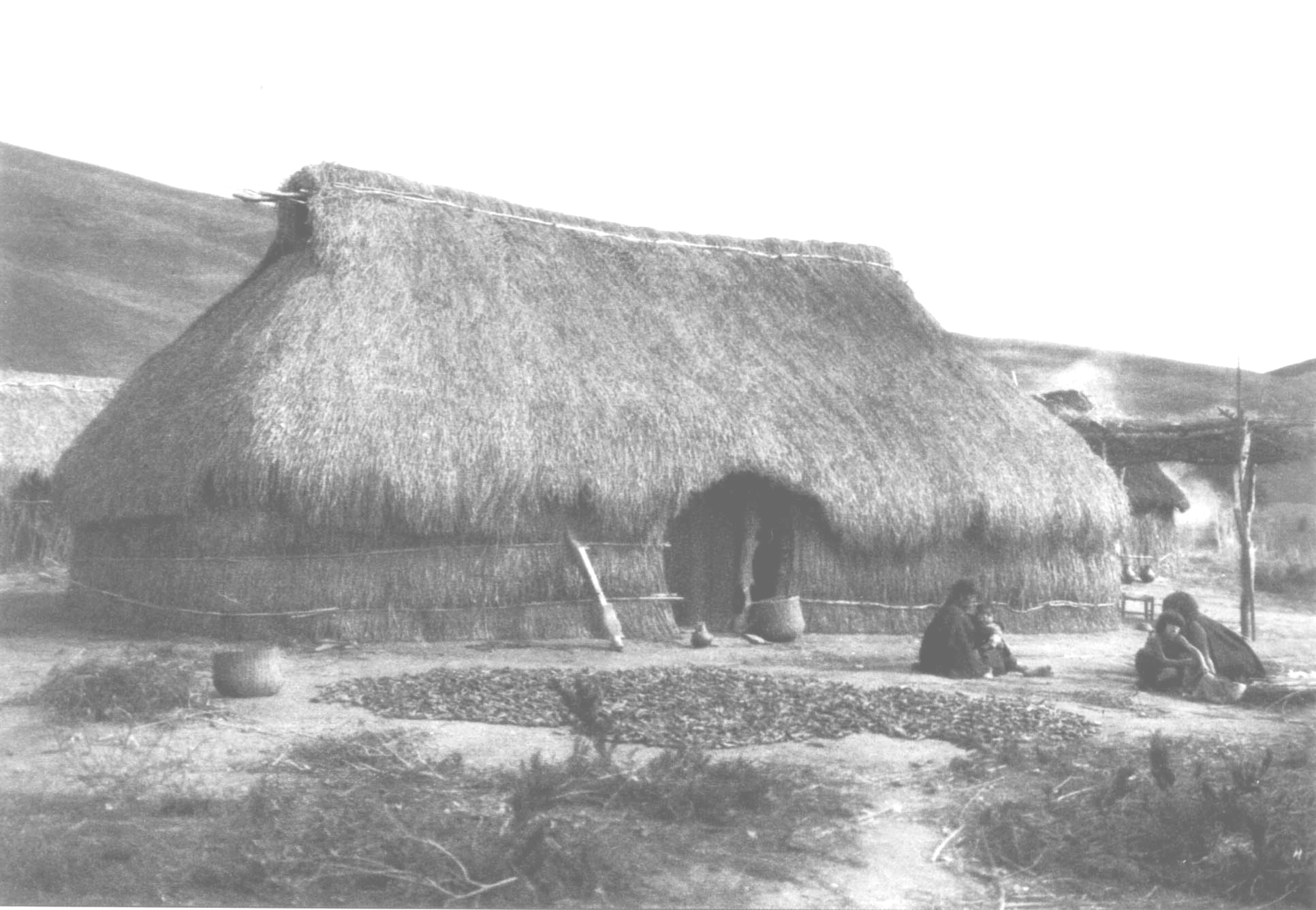
Portrait of a characteristic ruca of the Mapuche people inhabitant of the Araucanía Region, 1930.

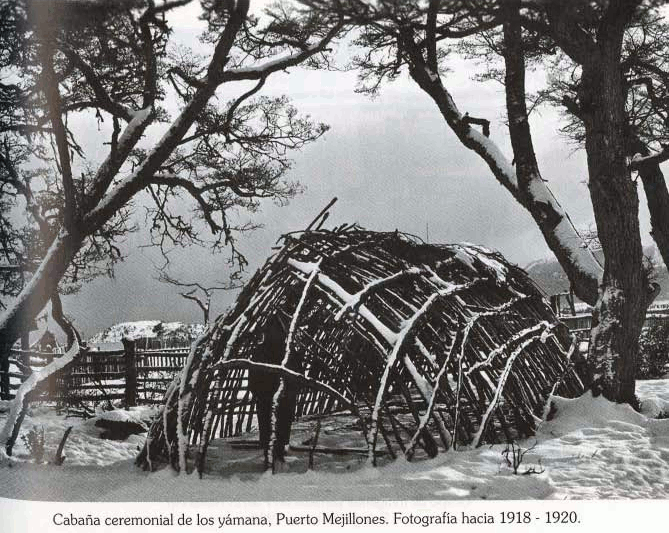
Ceremonial hut Yahgan people, a town inhabiting the Magallanes Region, 1918.

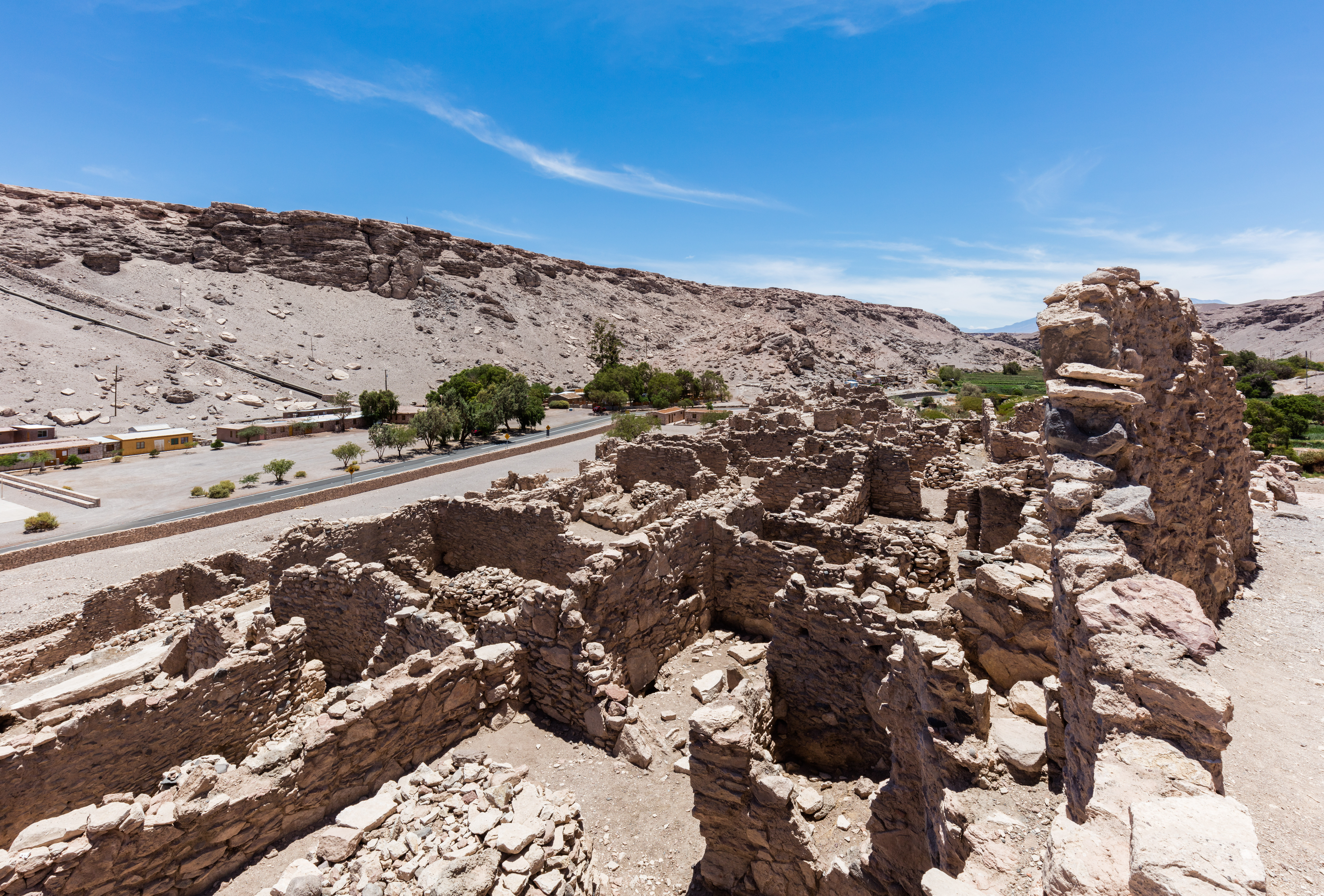
Inca stone architecture in El Loa Province, Antofagasta Region.

During the Pre-Columbian era, the northern part of Chile was ruled by the Inca Empire and was influenced by Inca culture and developed rich handicrafts. Inca buildings are mostly stone structures. The main features of their architectural style are the use of land topography and existing materials as part of the design. The stones they used are of three types: green Sacsayhuaman diorite porphyry, Yucay limestone and black andesite. Each stone can weigh several tons. They were mined by the Incas with harder stones and bronze tools. According to the marks on the stones, they were mostly smashed into a certain shape rather than cut. Adobe walls were usually laid on stone foundations and the roofs were usually made of grass or reeds. These grass or reeds were placed on wooden or sugarcane poles, tied together with ropes, and fixed to stone walls with prominent stone piles.

Most Inca buildings are simple and formal. They have similar appearance in design. They usually combine geometry with nature in combination with the landscape. Even though Inca builders usually employed no mortar, their architecture was highly resilient, and in fact, their particular use of dry stone masonry gave their buildings good anti-seismic qualities, which made them well-suited to the earthquake-prone regions of what is now Chile. Relatively few examples of Inca architecture in Chilean territory have survived to this day in good condition, though some remains of pukarás, or stone fortresses, can still be found. These defensive complexes, such as the Pukara of La Compañía and the Pucará de Chena, were linked by the road network known as the Inca Trail or Qhapak Ñan. Although the fortress of Quitor is also classified under the generic term of pucará, its construction actually predates Inca presence by a couple of centuries, which makes it one of the few well-preserved examples of both pre-Spanish and pre-Inca architecture in the country.

It is possible that some of these techniques were transmitted to territories beyond Inca rule, into the Mapuche area of influence. During the Arauco War, Spanish chroniclers would make note of the ability of the Mapuche to quickly erect simple but effective defensive fortifications. These were also given the generic term of pucará, though evidence suggests that Mapuche builders preferred the use of earthworks over stone masonry.

== Spanish Colonial period ==
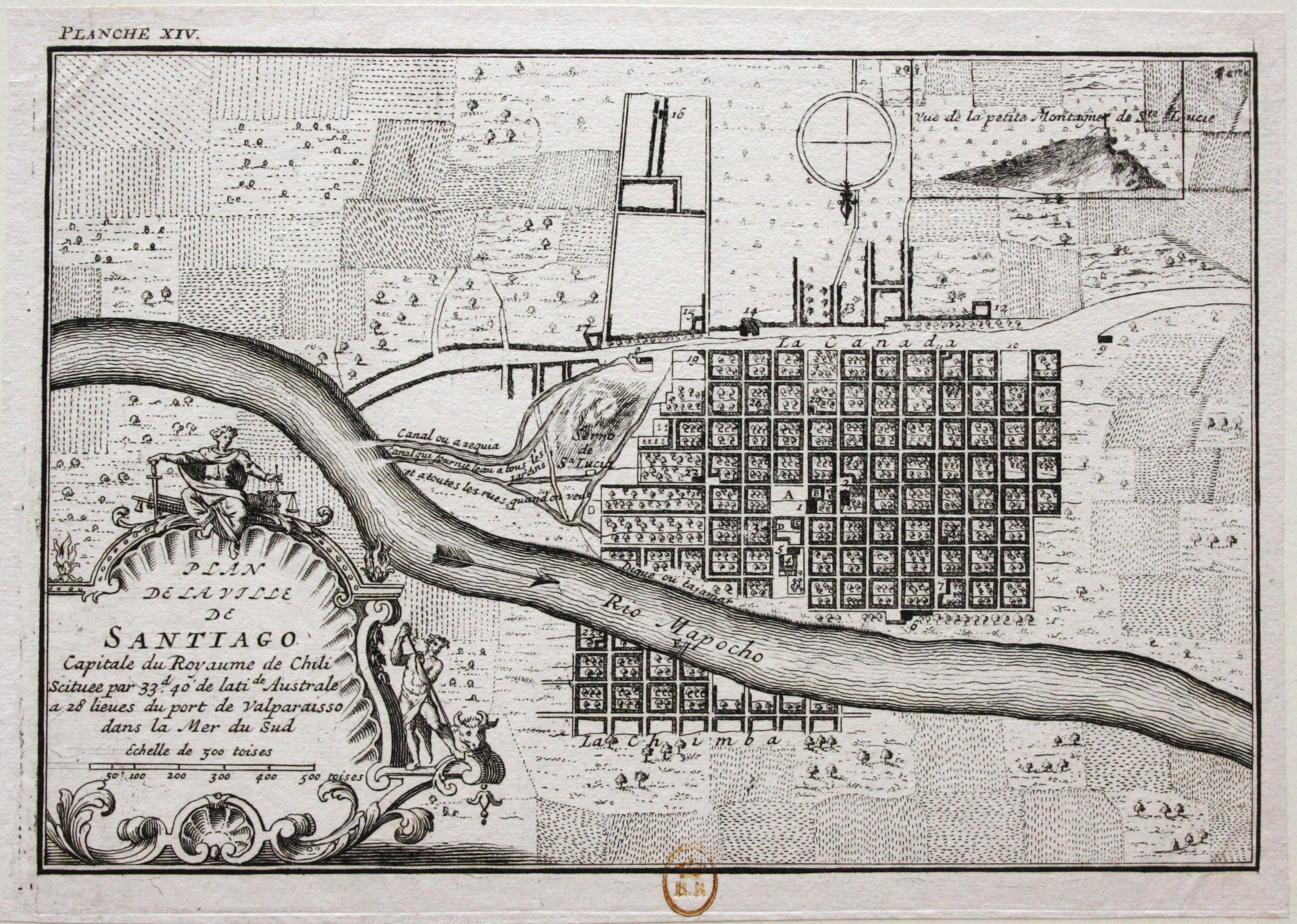
Plan of Santiago de Chile in 1716. Note the hypodamic design, with the square as the central point and the arrangement of the main buildings around it, a legacy of the Spanish colonial urbanization model.

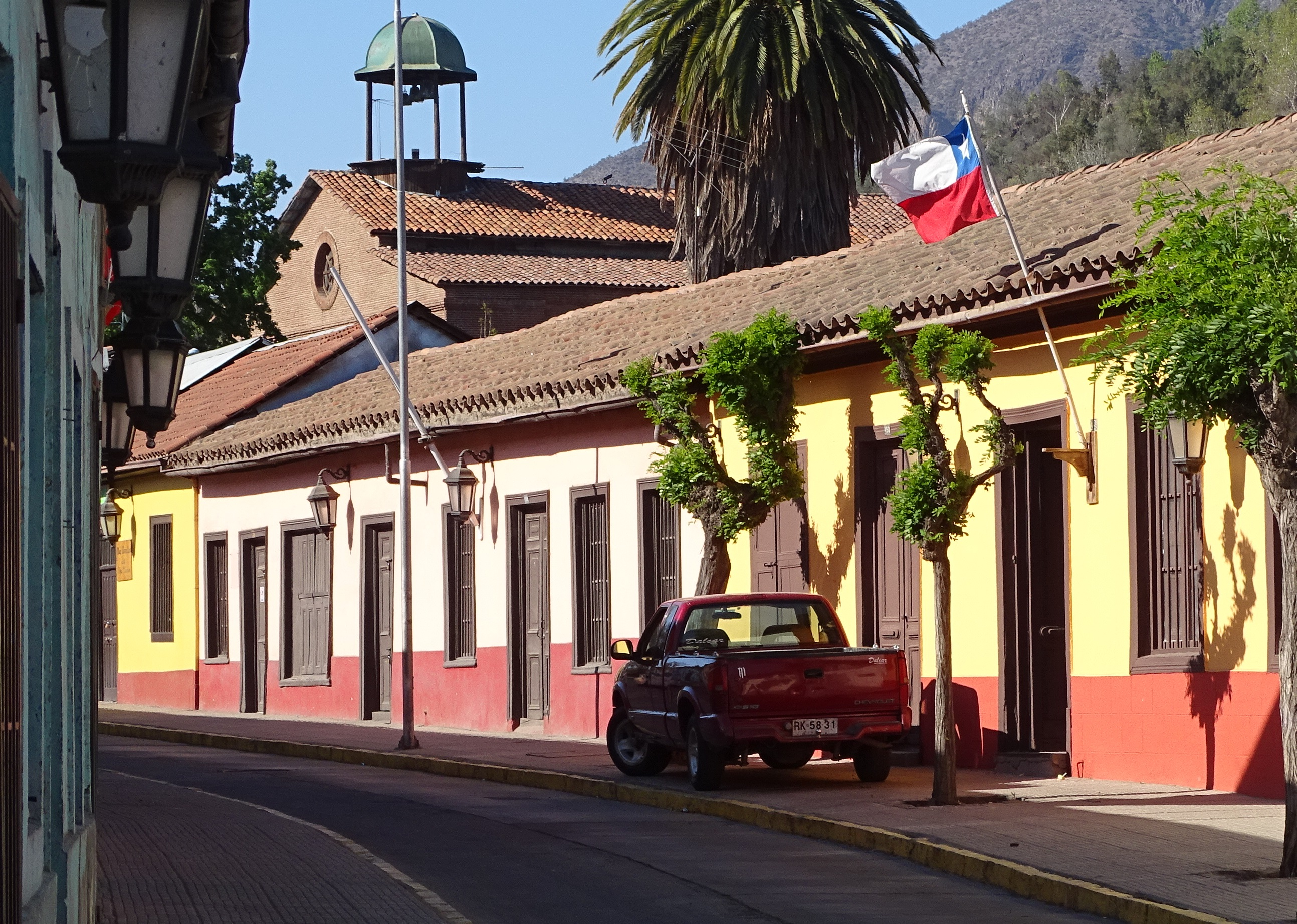
Calle Comercio of Putaendo, an example of traditional use and inherited from the Hispanic colonial style.

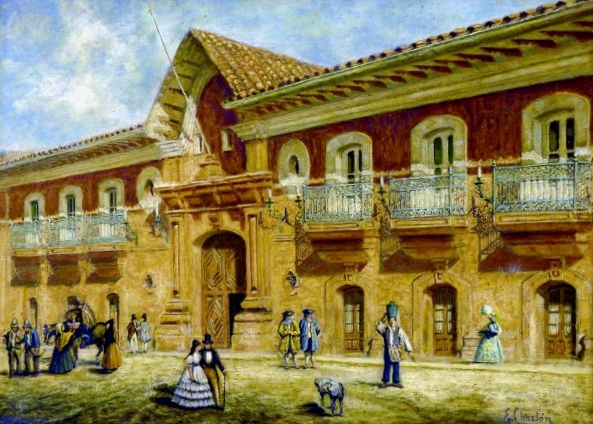
Casa Colorada, built in Santiago de Chile between 1769 and 1779 as the residence of Mateo de Toro Zambrano, an example of a richly ornamented frontispiece in colonial style.

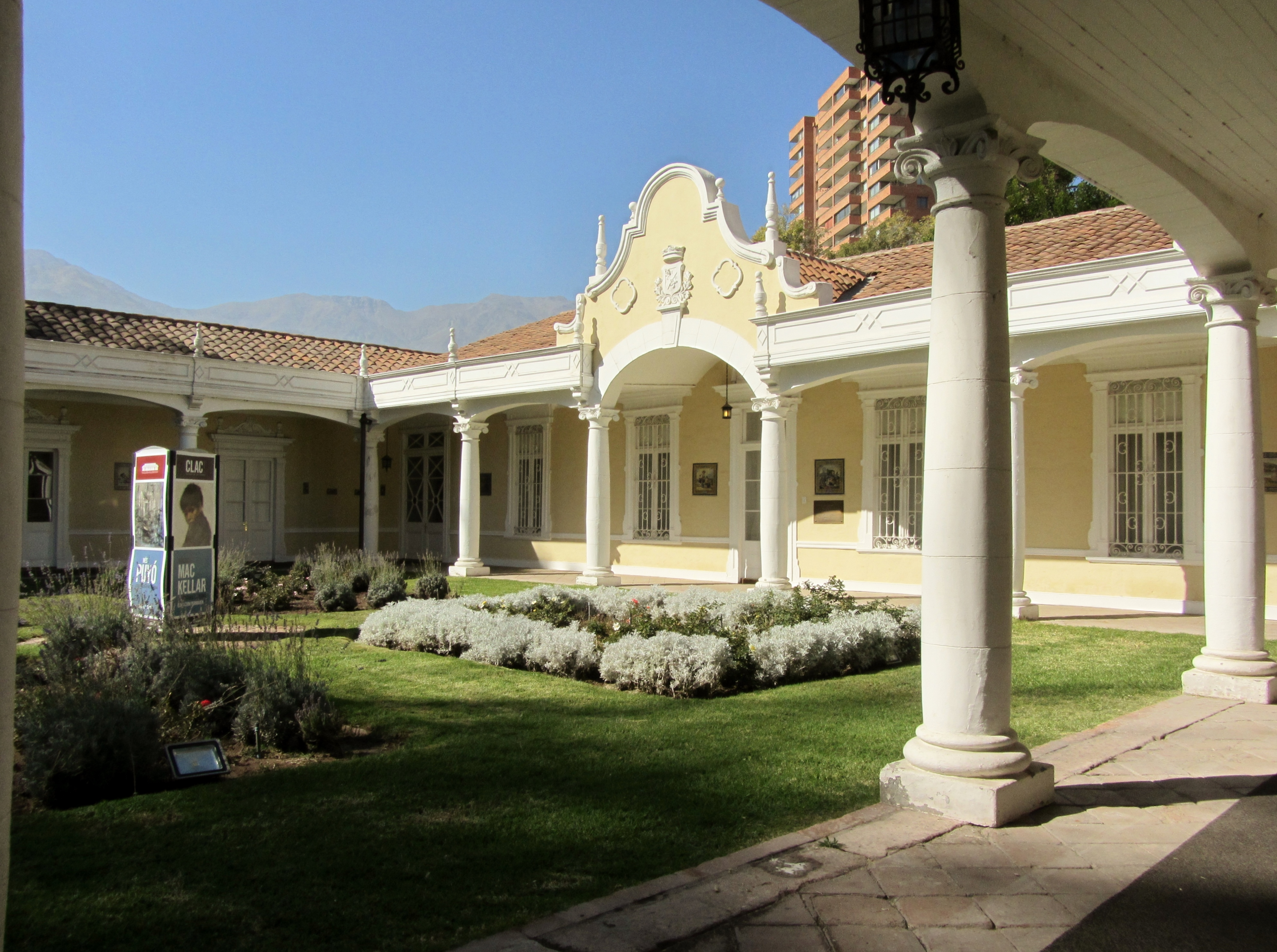
Interior garden, corridors, adobe and tiles in the mansion of Santa Rosa de Apoquindo, an example of the application of concepts and techniques of colonial traditionalism.
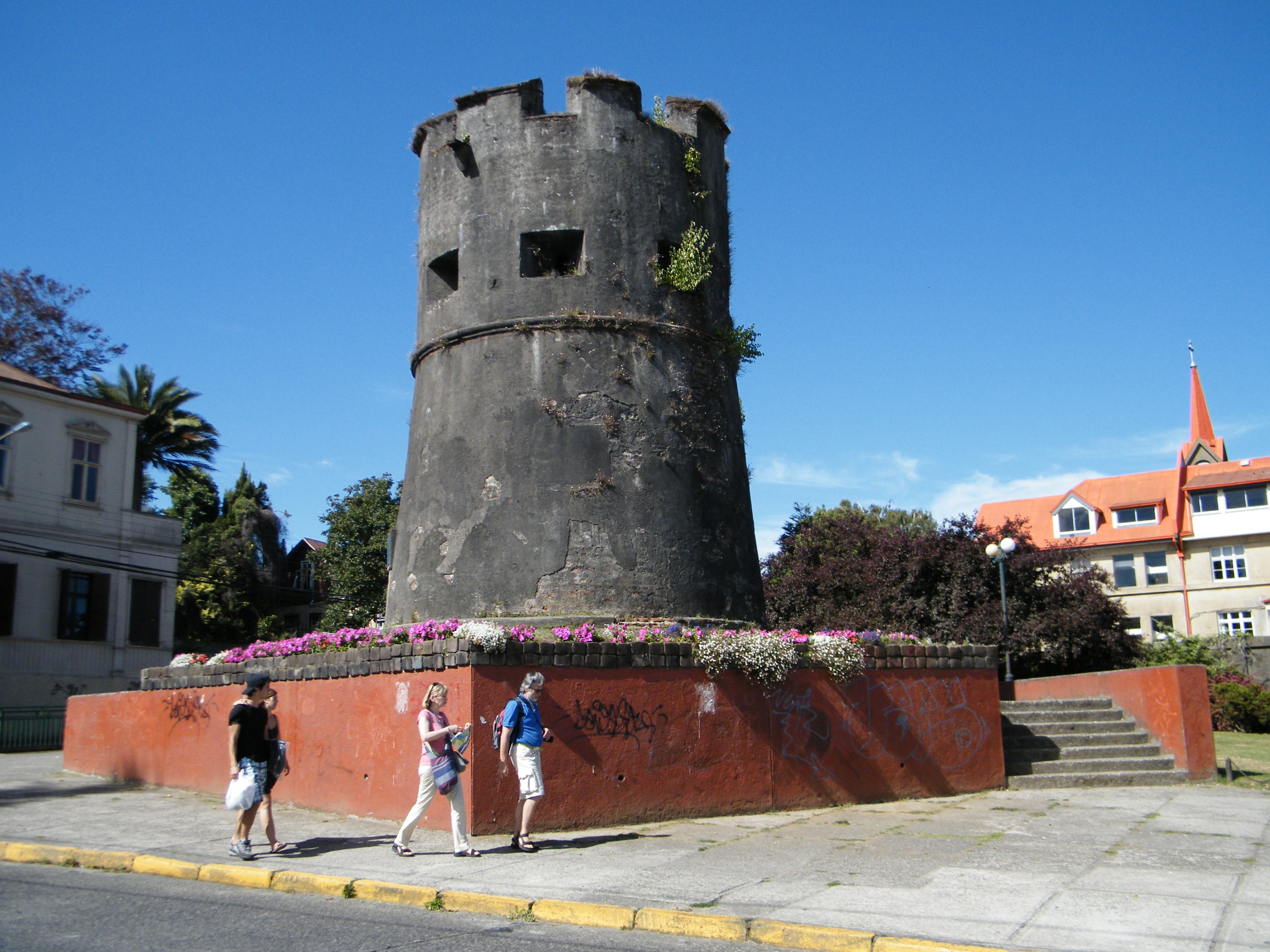
Torreón Los Canelos, Valdivia, designed by Juan Garland in 1678 and built in 1774, an example of Spanish architecture for military purposes.

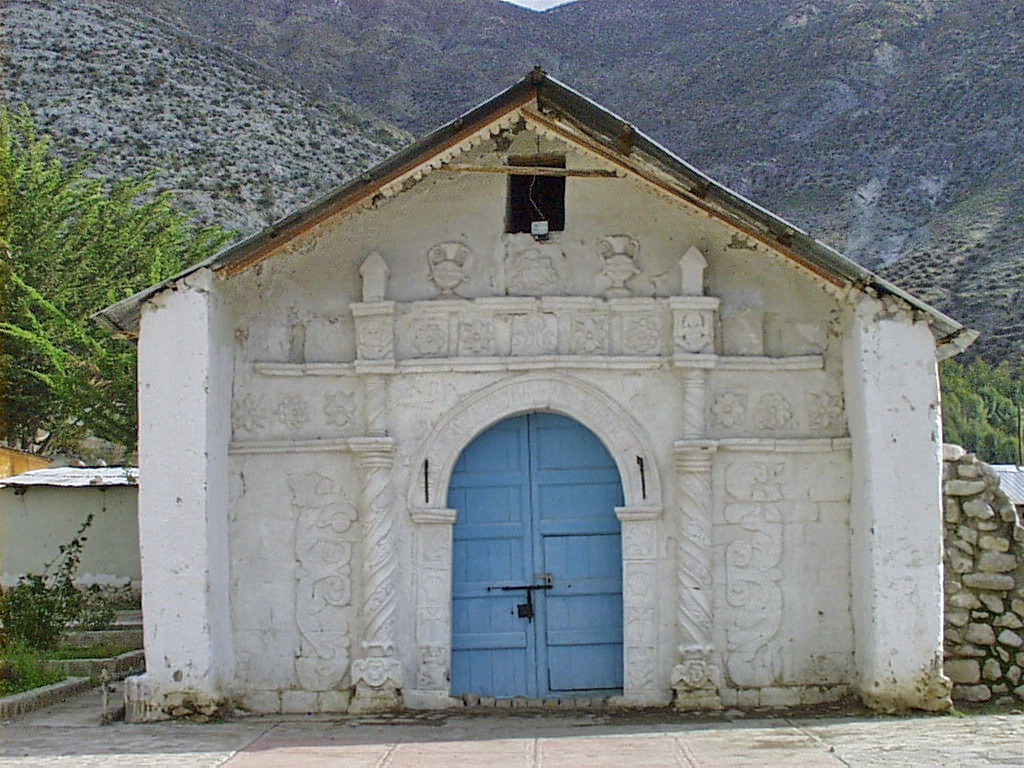
Iglesia de San Santiago, located in Belén, Region of Arica and Parinacota, erected in the 16th century in Andean Baroque style.

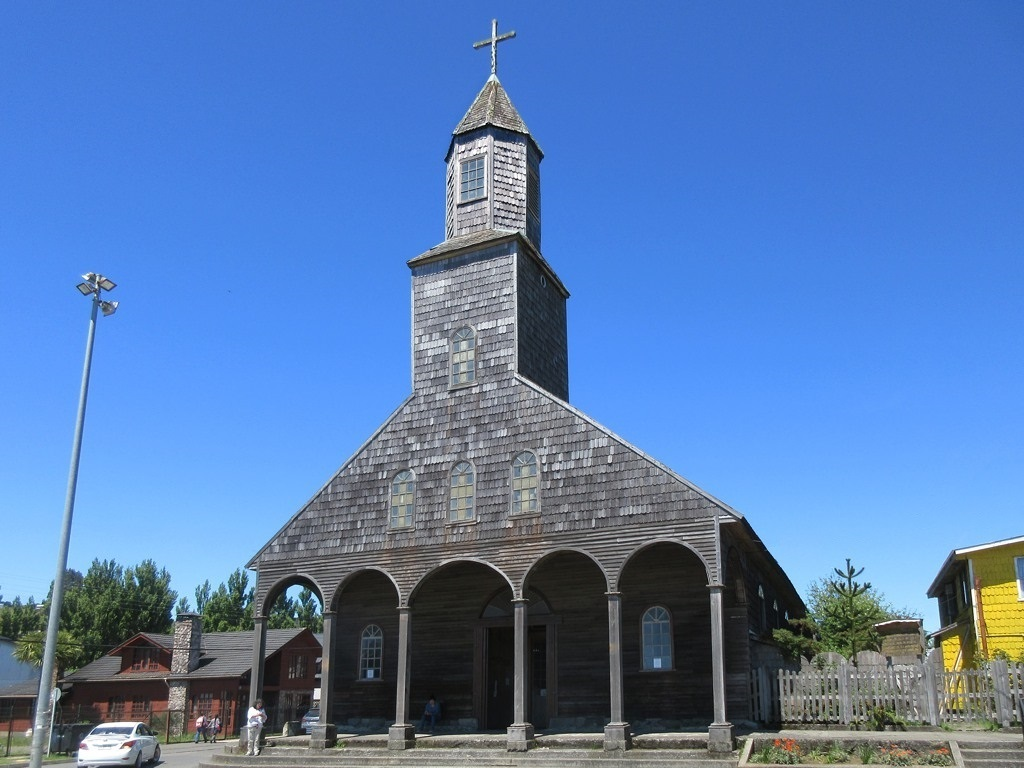
Iglesia de Achao, built in 1730, early representative of the wooden architecture of Chiloé, Los Lagos Region.

In 1540, Pedro de Valdivia was sent to invade Chile, and towns such as Santiago and Concepcion were established successively. Thus Chile became a Spanish colony between 1540 and 1818. Therefore, Chilean architectures at that time were full of Spanish characteristics. One of the most famous architect Joaquín Toesca arrived in Chile in 1780 and was responsible for the renovation of the Mapocho river dikes, the La Moneda and the finishing of the new cathedral, which were the most important architectural works of the period. He introduced new and technically more complex masonry buildings.

=== Plaza de Armas ===
The Plaza de Armas is located in Santiago, the capital of Chile. In 1541 Pedro de Valdivia built the city of Santiago and then ordered the construction of a plaza in the centre of the city.

According to Spanish practice, the location of the squares of cities established in the Americas needs to be flat and open. The original square has a gallows that symbolises royal law. Usually, the buildings surrounding the square are the residences of churches, royal courts, state treasury, city halls, prisons, and dignitaries.

At the beginning of the square, the central park was parked with wooden wagons loaded with agricultural goods, so the square also became the main trade market of the city. During the colonial period, some narrow and fixed stalls were formed, which formed some lanes around the square today. In 1860, influenced by European trends at the time, the square began to be gardened, and the centre opened a walking trail with green flowers and lush trees.

=== La Moneda Palace ===
During the Spanish colonial period, Palacio de la Moneda was once a coinage factory and one of the largest buildings built by Spanish colonists in the 18th century, not far from Plaza de Armas. This white building with a typical neoclassical style is now the presidential palace of Chile. The tall bronze statue of Allende stands on the Constitution Square outside the north gate of the presidential palace.

=== Iglesia San Francisco de Alameda ===
In Santiago, Chile, Iglesia San Francisco de Alameda, one of the oldest churches in Santiago, was built in 1622, but the bell tower was destroyed by the earthquake in 1647. After reconstruction, it was destroyed again by an earthquake in 1730 and was dismantled in 1751. The current clock tower was rebuilt by architect Fermín Vivaceta in the mid-19th century Victorian era.

=== Santiago Metropolitan Cathedral ===
Santiago Metropolitan Cathedral was founded in 1748. The original church had no bell tower. In 1780, the bishop recommended to the Spanish royal family the Roman architect Joaquín Toesca to repair the front of the cathedral and chapel. The cathedral was neoclassical in style. Two bell towers were completed at the end of 1800, one year after his death. There are three arched corridors in the church, each of which is more than 90 m (300 ft) long. The remains of all Chilean bishops remain in the cathedral.

== 19th–early 20th century ==
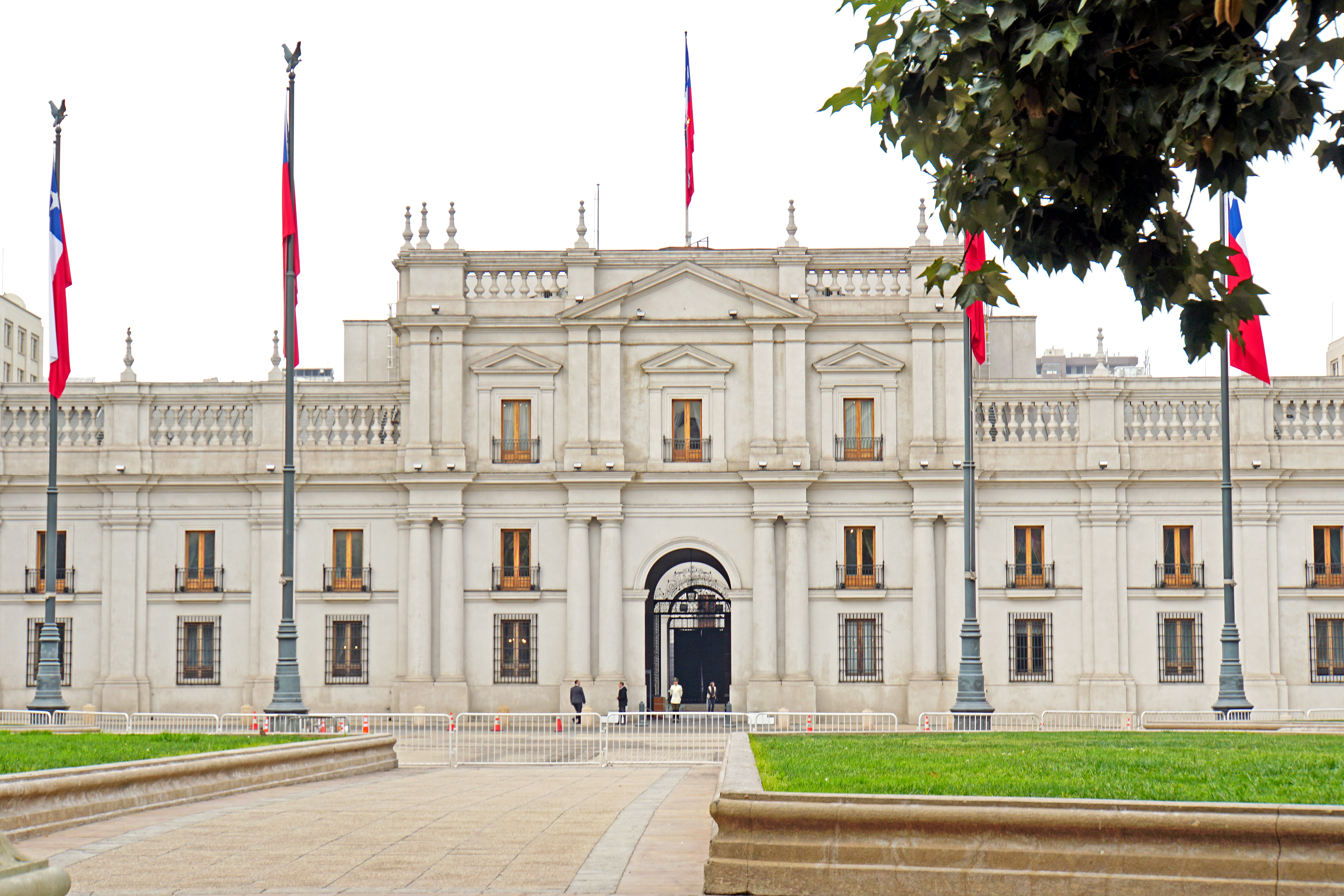
Palacio de la Moneda, designed by Joaquín Toesca and completed in 1805 during the end of the colony, is an immediate antecedent of the Neoclassical architecture, which would become common at the dawn of the young Chilean republic.

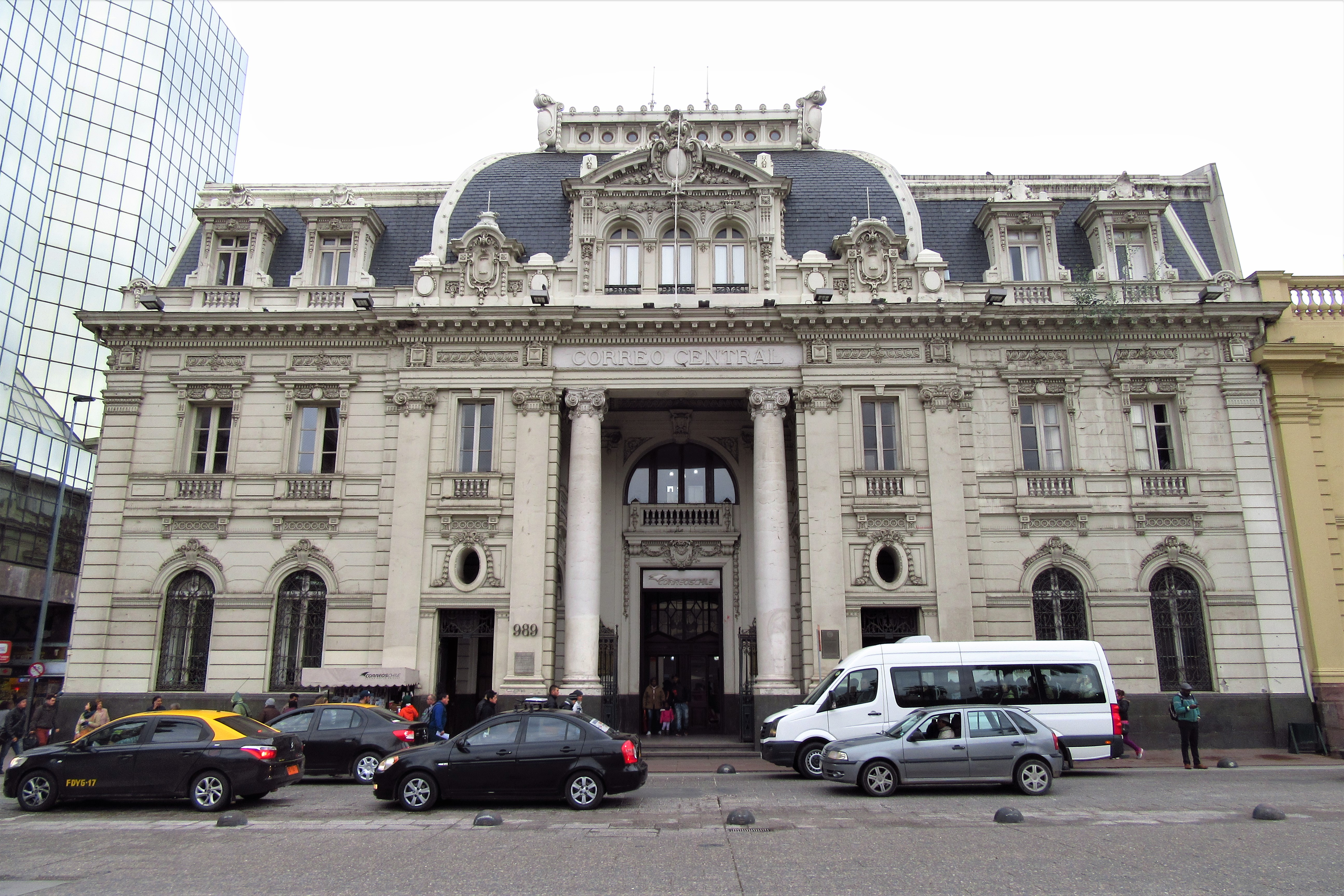
Central Post Office of Santiago, a building in the Beaux-Arts style, after its remodeling in 1908 by Ramón Feherman.

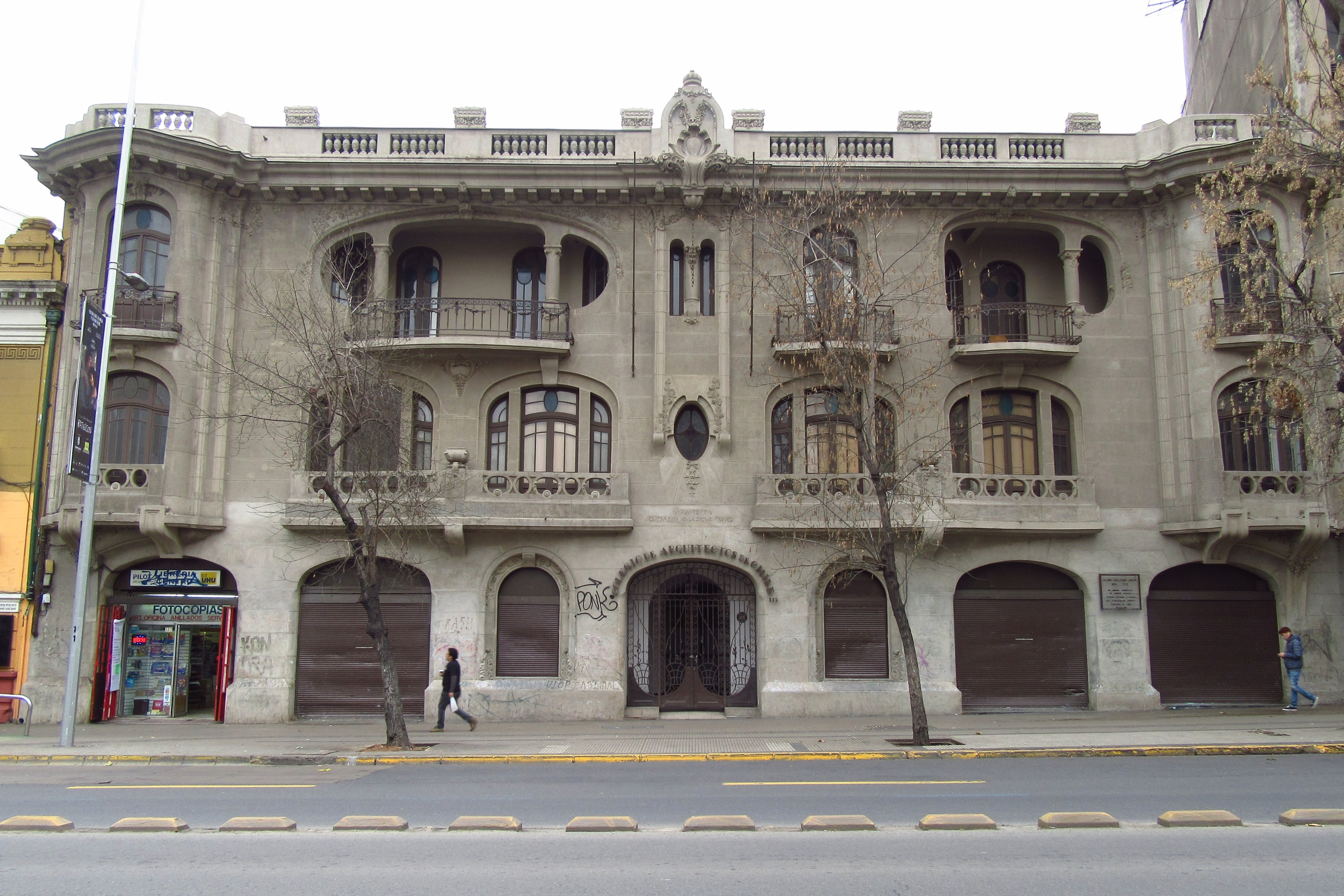
National Headquarters of the College of Architects of Chile, art Nouveau architecture, designed by Luciano Kulczewski and built in 1920.

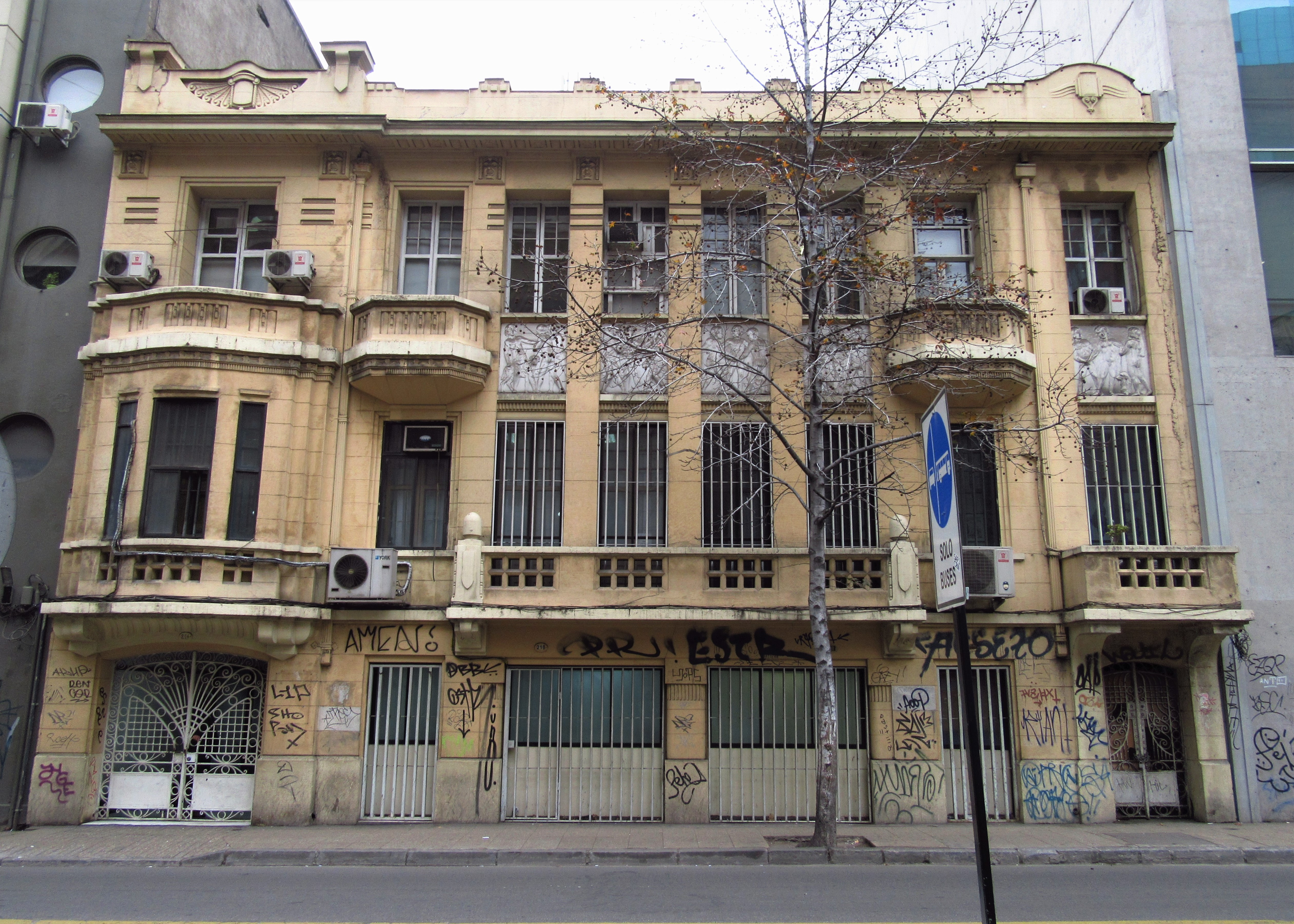
Hermanos Amunátegui 219, building built at the beginning of the 20th century in Art Deco architecture.
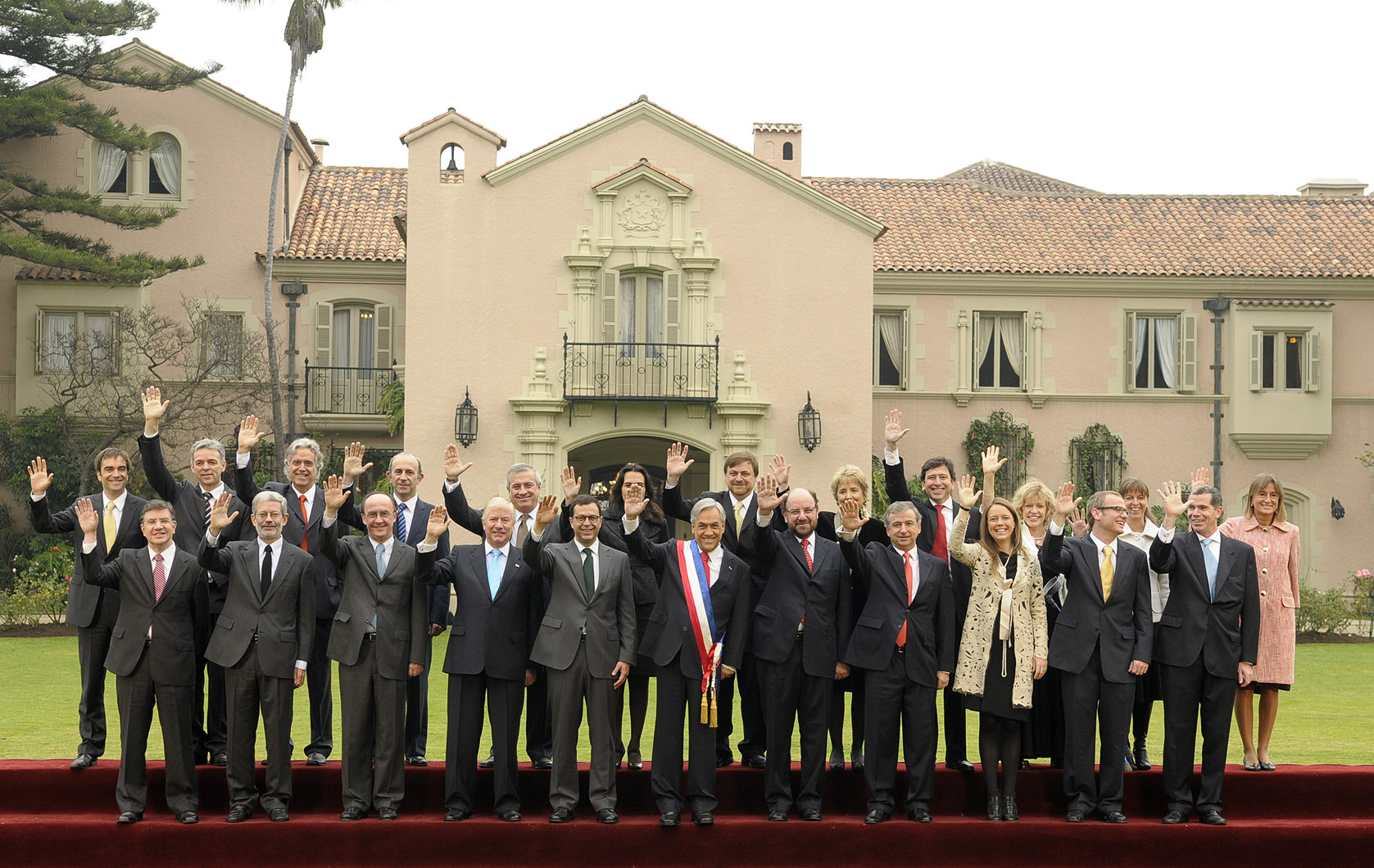
Presidential Palace of Cerro Castillo, in Spanish Colonial Revival architecture style, inaugurated in 1930.

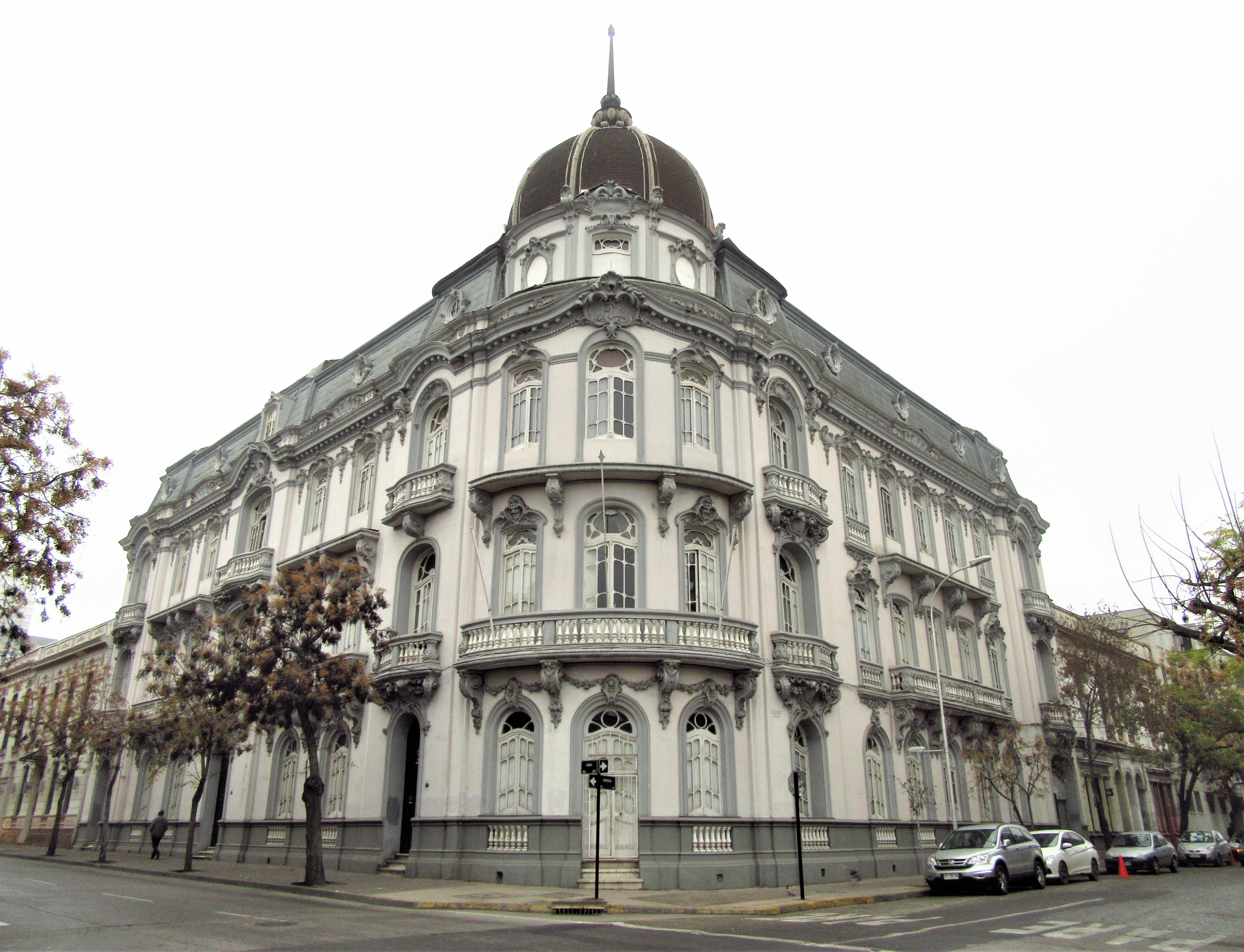
Larraín-Mancheño Palace, a building built in 1913 in Rococo Revival architecture.

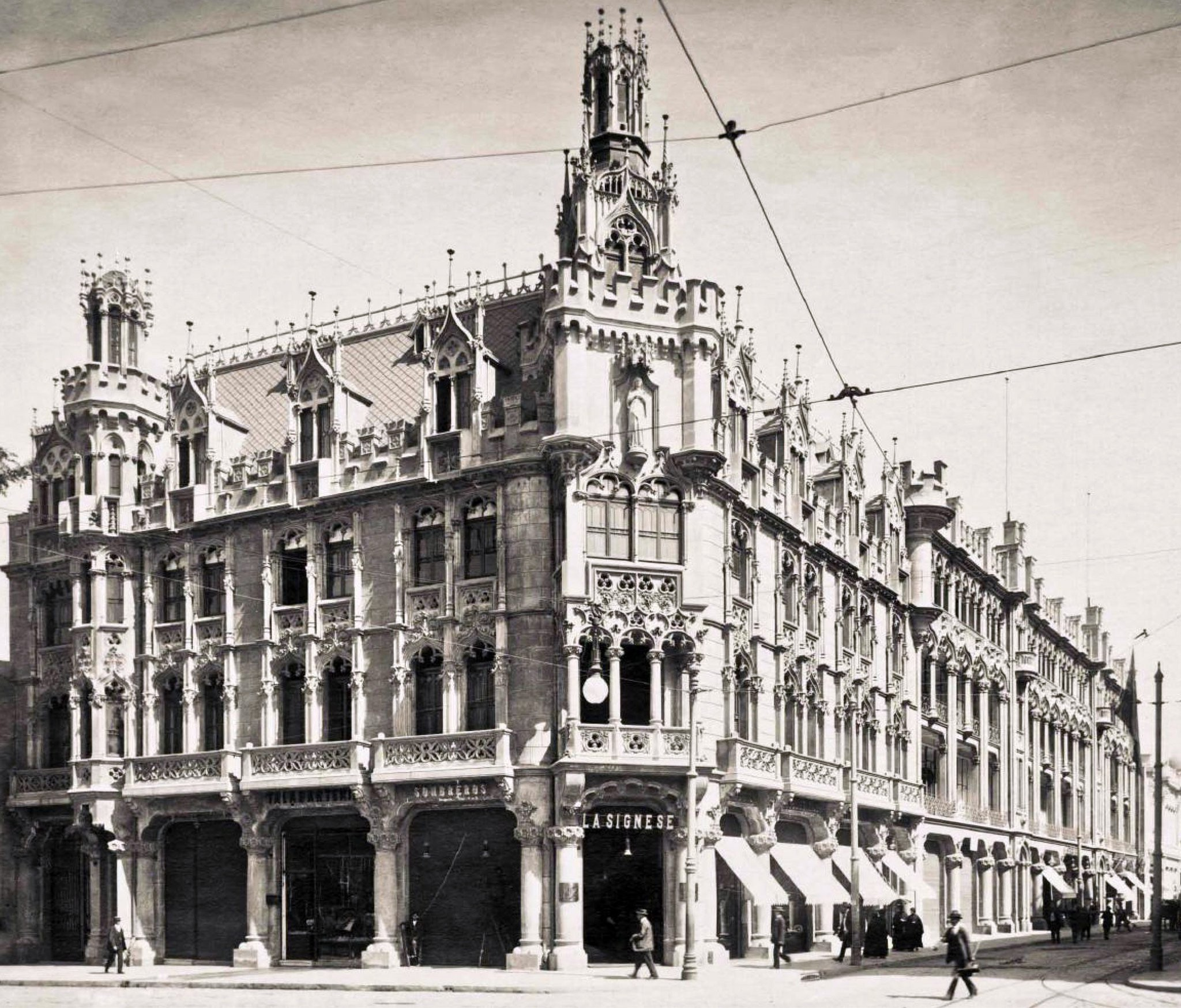
Undurraga Palace, inaugurated in 1915, representative of the Gothic Revival architecture.

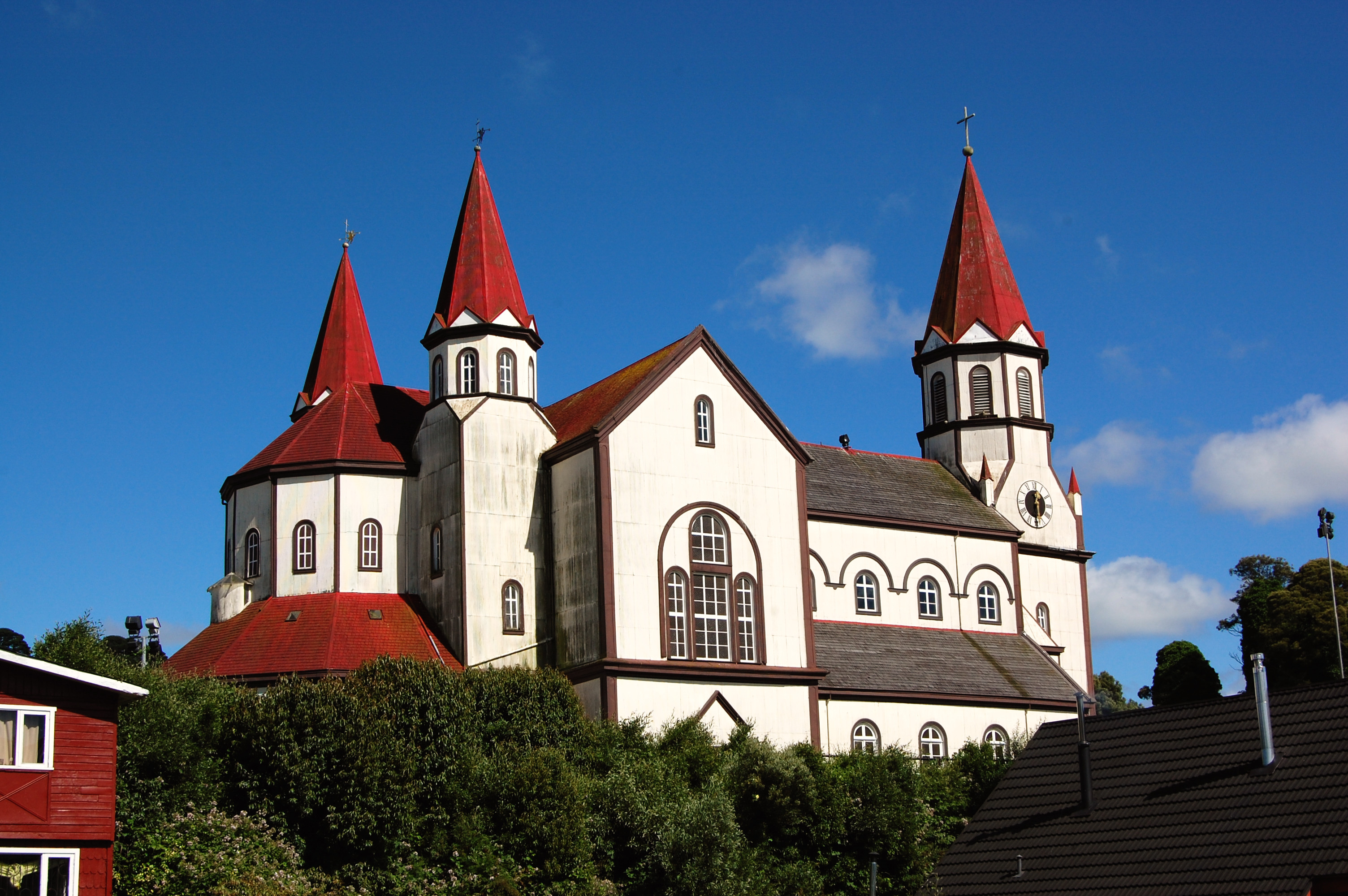
Church of the Sacred Heart of Jesus (Puerto Varas), an example of the use of wood in the architecture of the south of the country, which ranges from German-Romanesque Revival to Carpenter Gothic, and which displays German-Chilean syncretism.

In 1818, Bernardo O'Higgins officially declared Chile's independence and established a republic. As he proposed and promulgated some advanced clauses, such as abolishing the nobility, developing public schools, allowing the spread of Protestantism and encouraging foreign trade, new ideas penetrated into the framework of society and in architecture.

In the mid-19th century, French architect François Brunet de Baines was commissioned by the Chilean government to create a new generation of educational system for Chilean architects. He personally directed and taught professional architect courses until his death in 1855. During this period, he completed a textbook on architecture, which is probably one of the earliest textbooks in Latin America. Lucien Hénault then took over from 1857 to 1872. As they both came from the Paris College of Art, Chilean architecture at that time was similar to French architecture.

At the end of the 19th century, more foreign architects arrived in Chile. Some of them were hired by the government, and others set up private firms, which brought new forms and technologies to Chile. These changes are reflected in many public and private buildings. Ultimately, Chilean architectural styles became one of the most interesting and complex styles in Latin America in the 19th century.

=== Chilean National Museum of Fine Arts ===
The Chilean National Museum of Fine Arts was founded in 1880. Its shape is Baroque style, but it also contains new architectural structural elements. It is a new and old metal structure building. Its roof is made of translucent material, which is used to solve the lighting problem of the main building. Many excellent works of art are collected and protected in the museum so as not to be destroyed in exile, and different art exhibitions are held regularly.

=== Central Post Office Building ===
The Central Post Office Building was originally built as the private residence of the Spanish conquistador Pedro de Valdivia. In the colonial period, it was the governor's residence. Since Chile became independent, it was used as the presidential residence until 1846, the government office and the presidential residence moved to La Moneda Palace, the current presidential palace. Shortly afterwards, the building caught fire, with only several walls from the original building left behind.

In 1882, it was converted into a neoclassical building which was the predecessor of the Central Post Office building.

In 1908, to welcome the celebration of Chile's independence for its centenary, a third layer of French Neoclassical style and a dome by Ramón Feherman were added to the Central Post Office.

=== The saltpeter boom ===
By the mid-19th century, the Chilean economy gradually shifted focus from agriculture towards mining. Coal and silver mines (in Lota and Chañarcillo, respectively) were an important early source of revenue for private families and the state alike, but this process was exacerbated by the end of the War of the Pacific (1879–1884), when Chile came into possession of large territories rich in saltpeter deposits. The saltpeter mining industry thrived from that point up to the collapse of saltpeter prices due to the development of synthetic alternatives during World War I. During this period, many families made fortunes in the mining, shipping and banking sectors. These families were capable of commissioning large residential projects from European and Chilean architects, done in the styles that were fashionable at the time: Neoclassicism, Second Empire, Gothic and Spanish Colonial Revival were among the major influences, though many of these buildings merged different styles in examples of Eclecticism.

These mansions came to be commonly known as palacios ('palaces'). As the Great Depression led to the financial ruin of many mining dynasties, several of these palaces were eventually acquired by city governments, and now function as city halls, cultural centers or museums, while others were sectioned for smaller residential and commercial use, and others still (such as the Palacio Pereira in Santiago or the Palacio Subercaseaux in Valparaíso) fell into disrepair and have been abandoned or demolished.

The increased revenues perceived by the Chilean state through taxes and royalties on largely foreign-owned mining companies also led to an increase in public works, though these tended to be concentrated in the capital. The extensive renovations of the layout of downtown Santiago started by Benjamín Vicuña Mackenna coincide with this period, as do multiple public buildings such as the Museum of Fine Arts, the Central Post Office Building, the National Library, the entrance to Santa Lucía Hill or the Central Railway Station.

== Late 20th–early 21st century ==
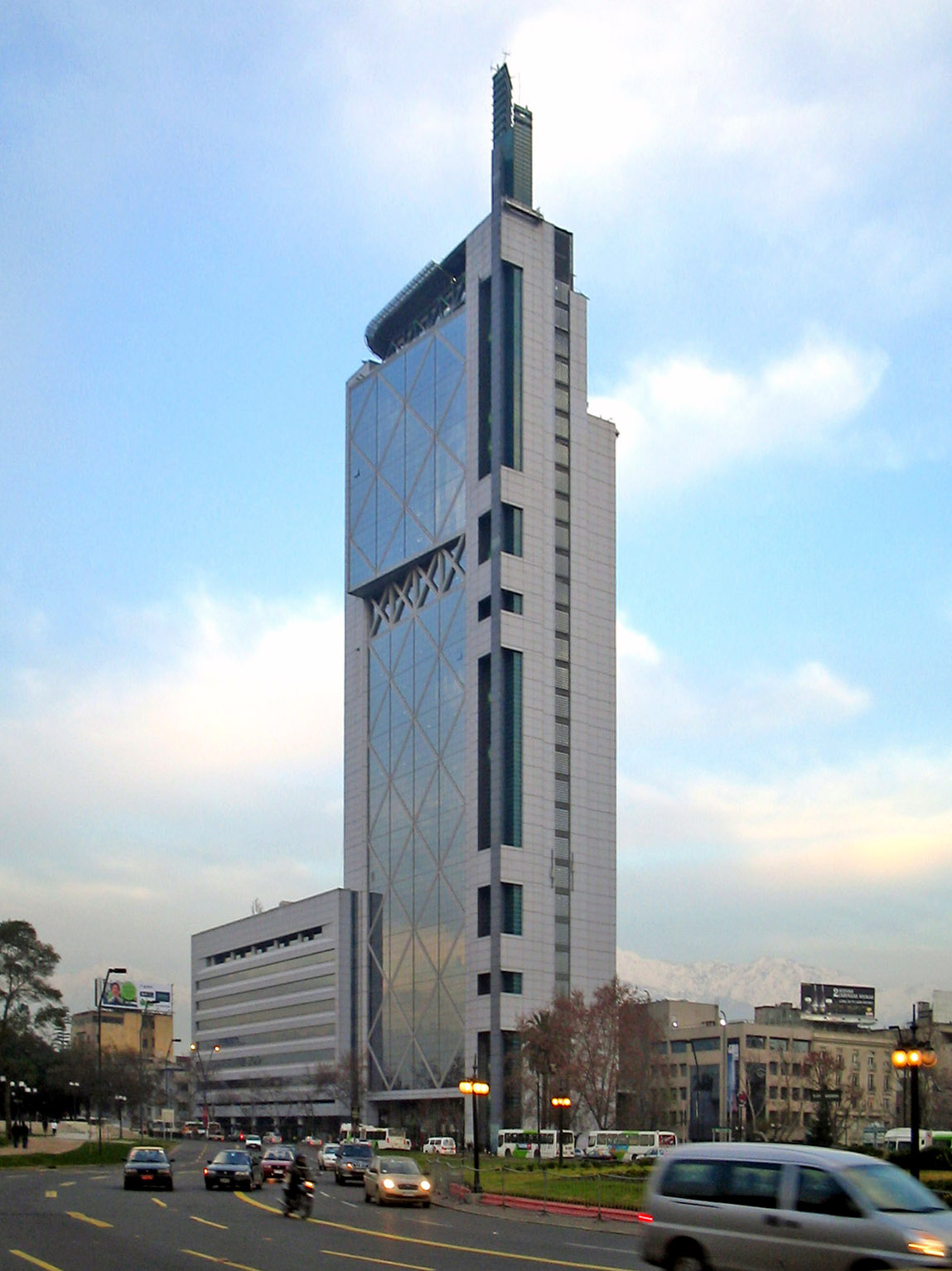
Torre Telefónica, built in 1993, symbolizes innovation and avant-garde technology, and represents High-tech architecture.

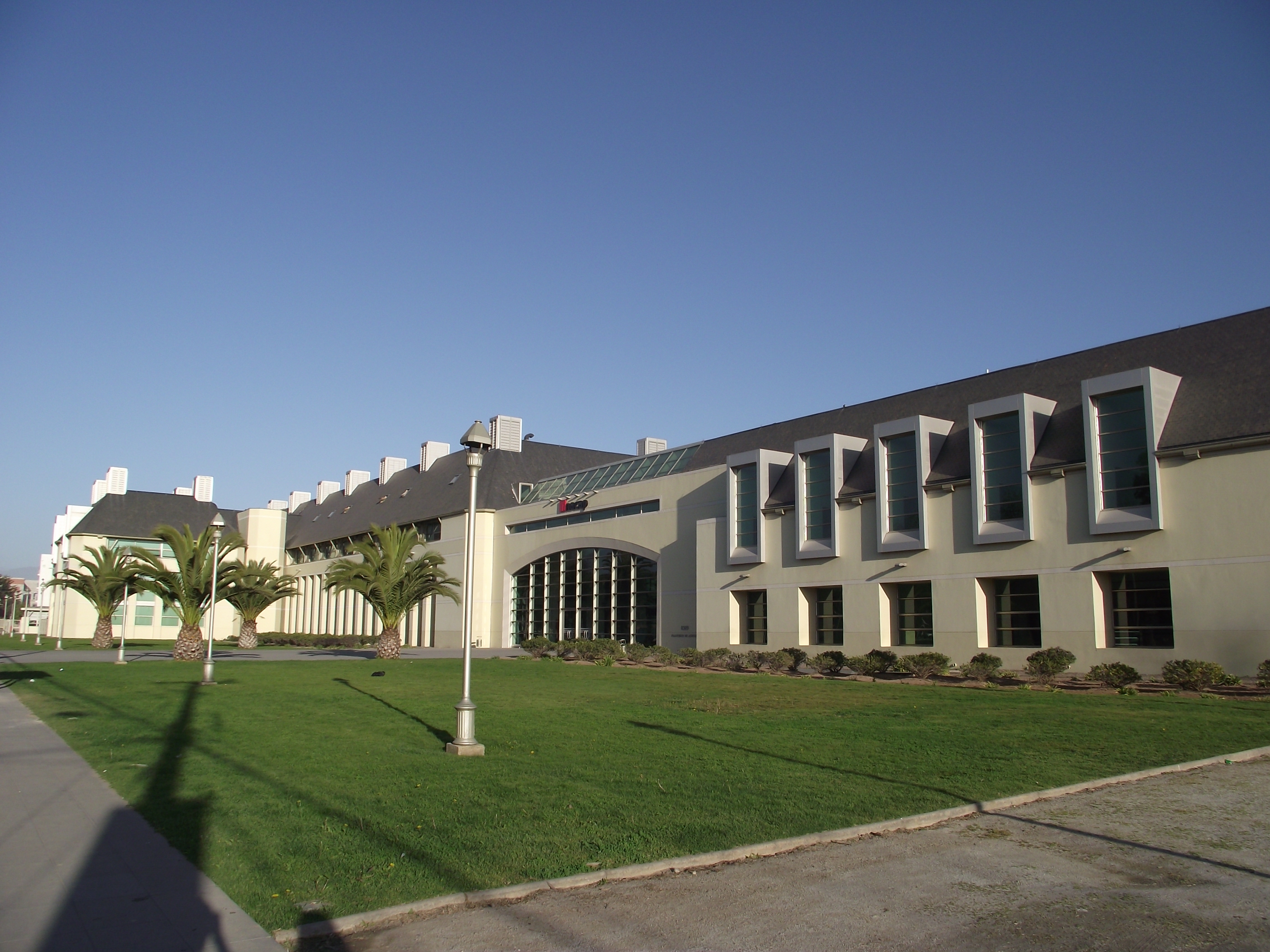
Inacap Headquarters in La Serena, designed in 2001, is an example of Postmodern architecture.

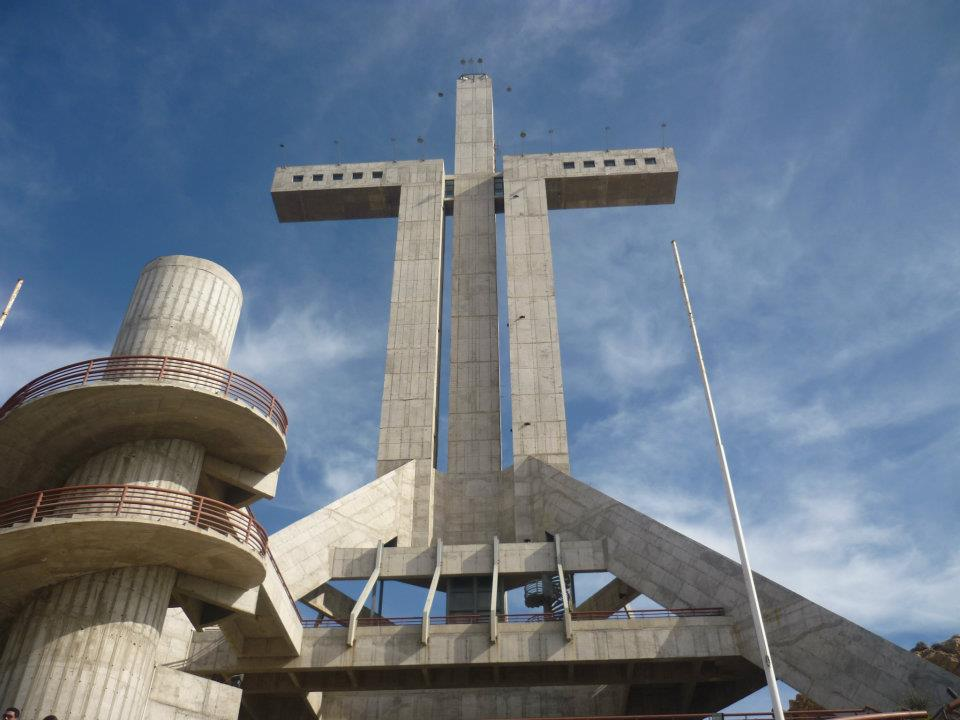
Cruz del Tercer Milenio, completed in 2001, is representative of Brutalist architecture.

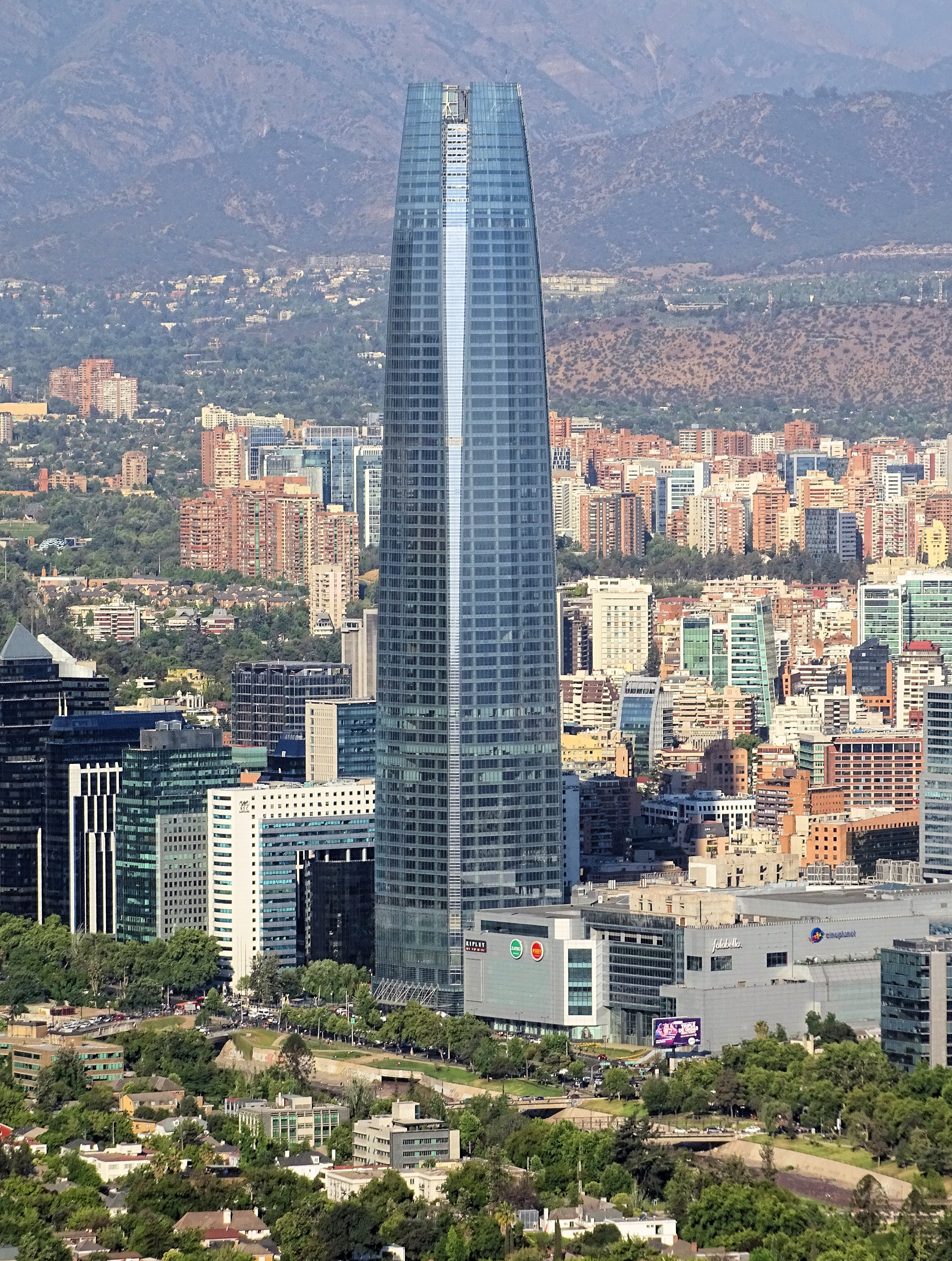
Gran Torre Santiago was the tallest skyscraper in Latin America and the Southern Hemisphere between 2012 and 2020.
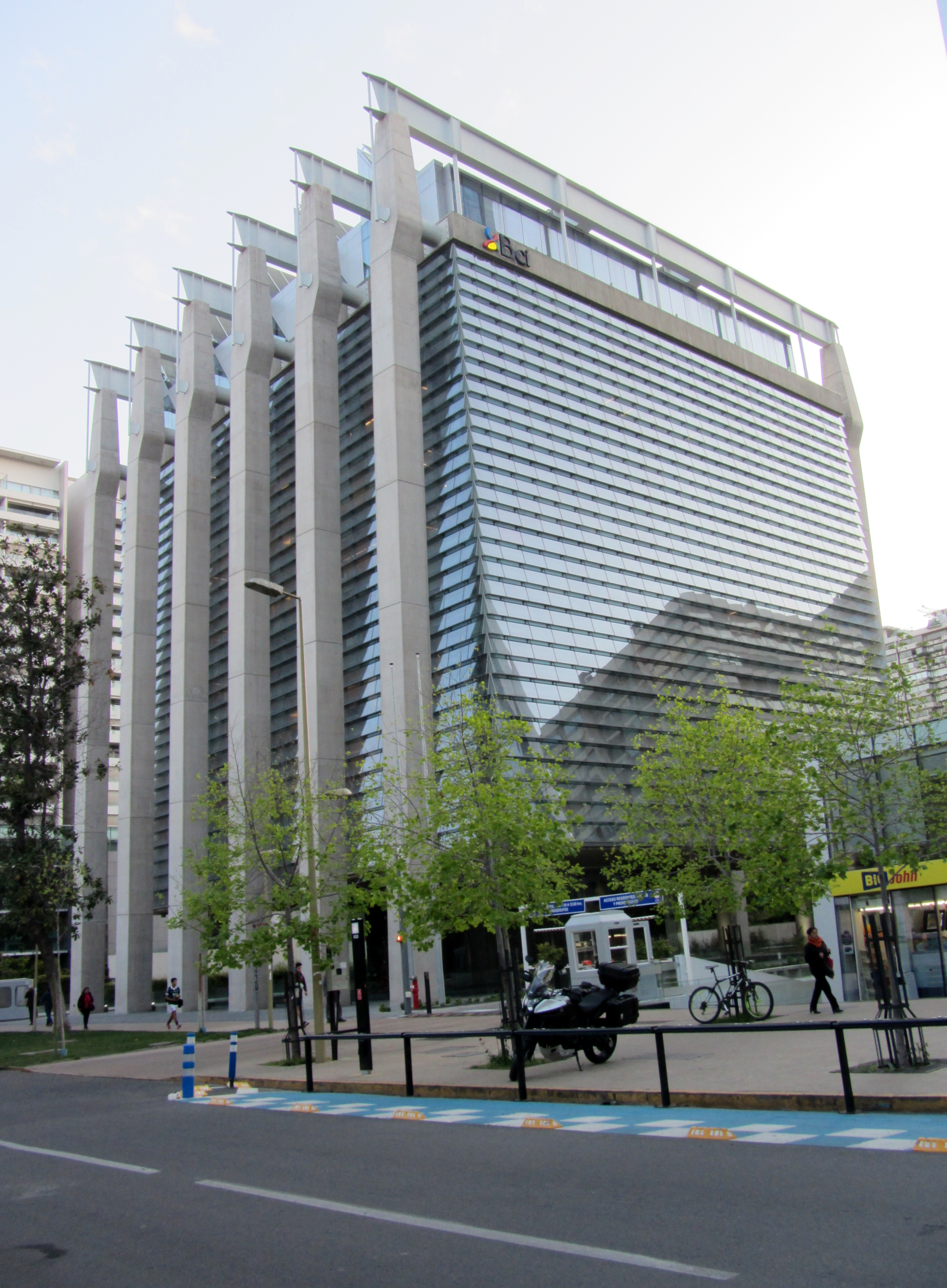
Semisuspended building BCI Alcántara 99, by Borja Huidobro, opened in 2012.

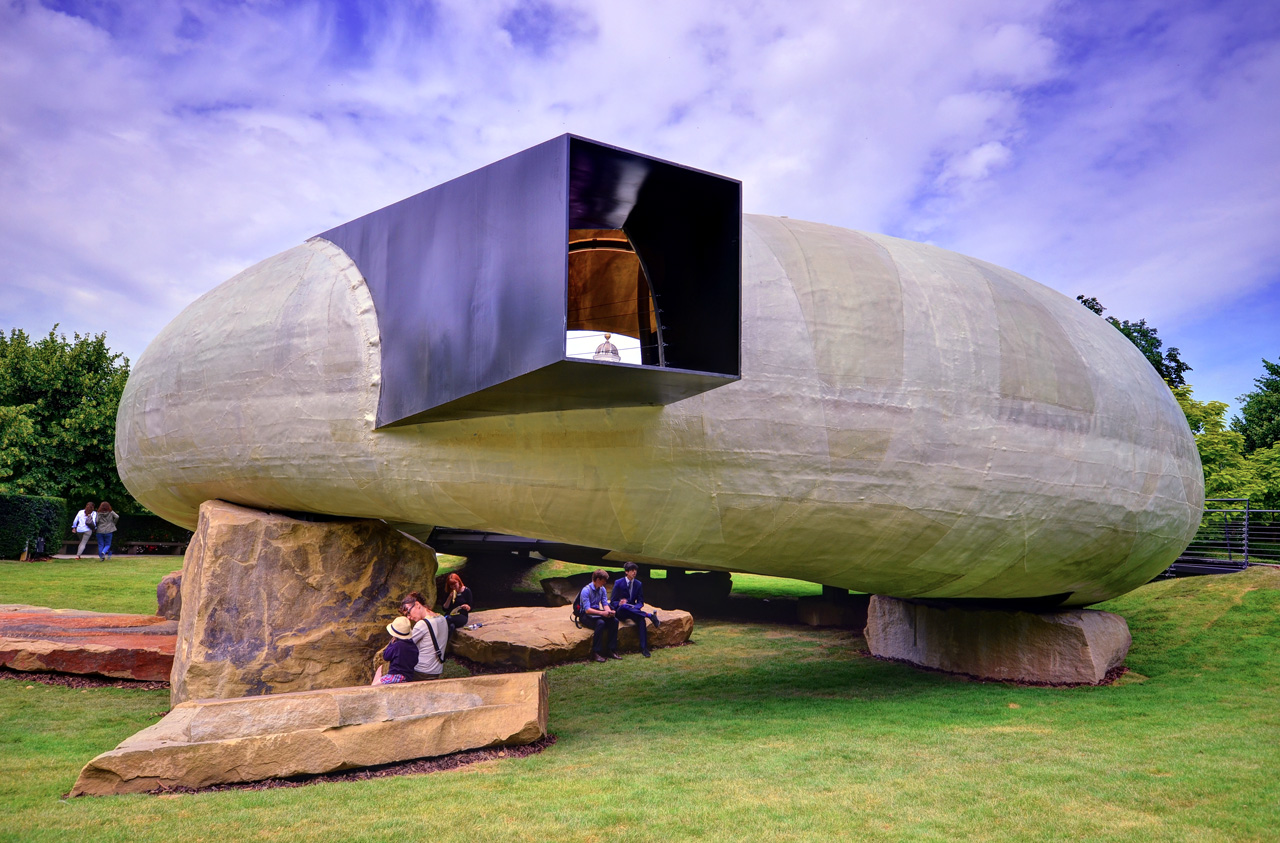
Smiljan Radic Pavilion at the Serpentine Gallery in London, 2014, a Naturalistic style work, and an example of the internationalization of Chilean architects.

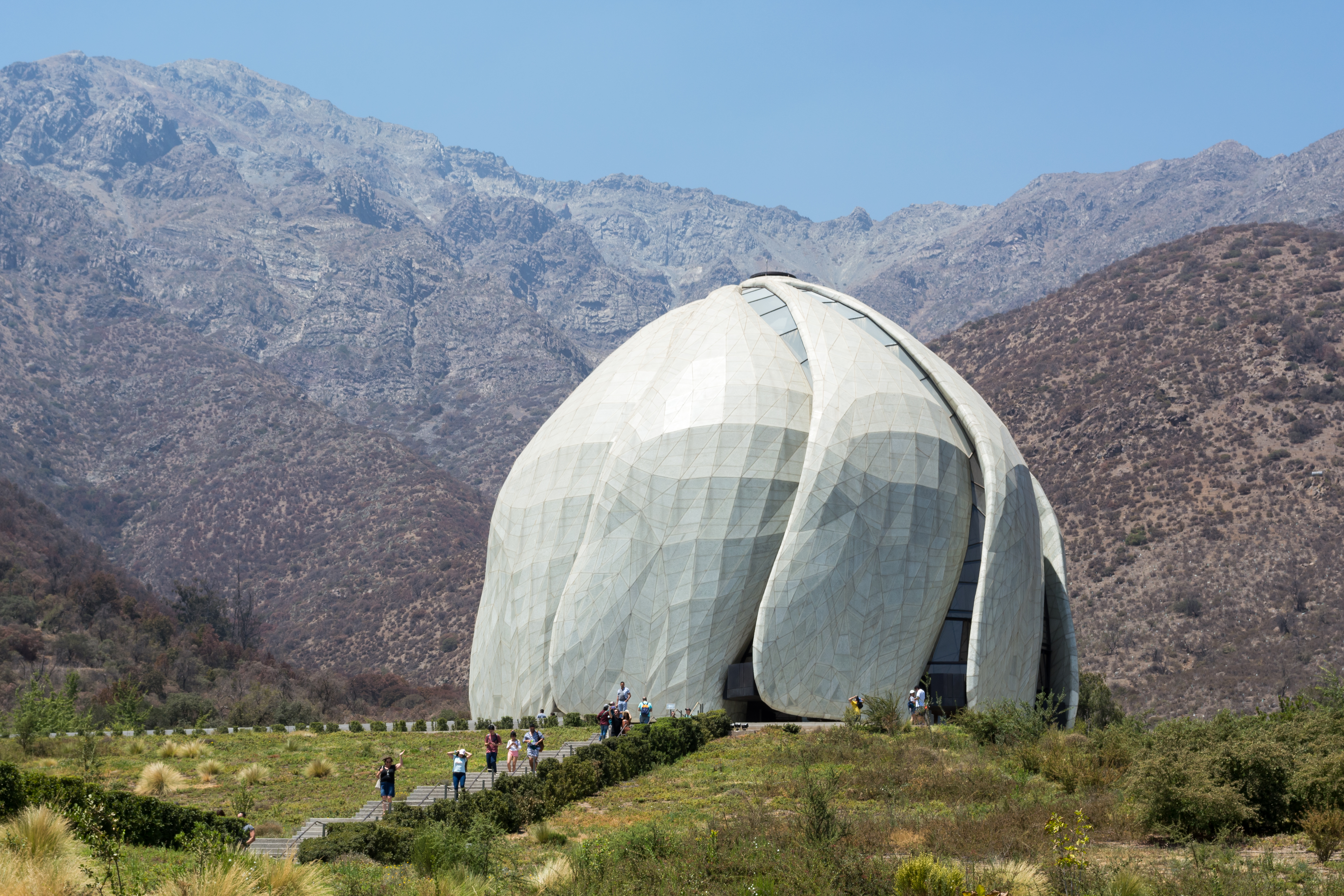
Santiago Bahá'í Temple, en Peñalolén, completed in 2016, in Organic architecture style.

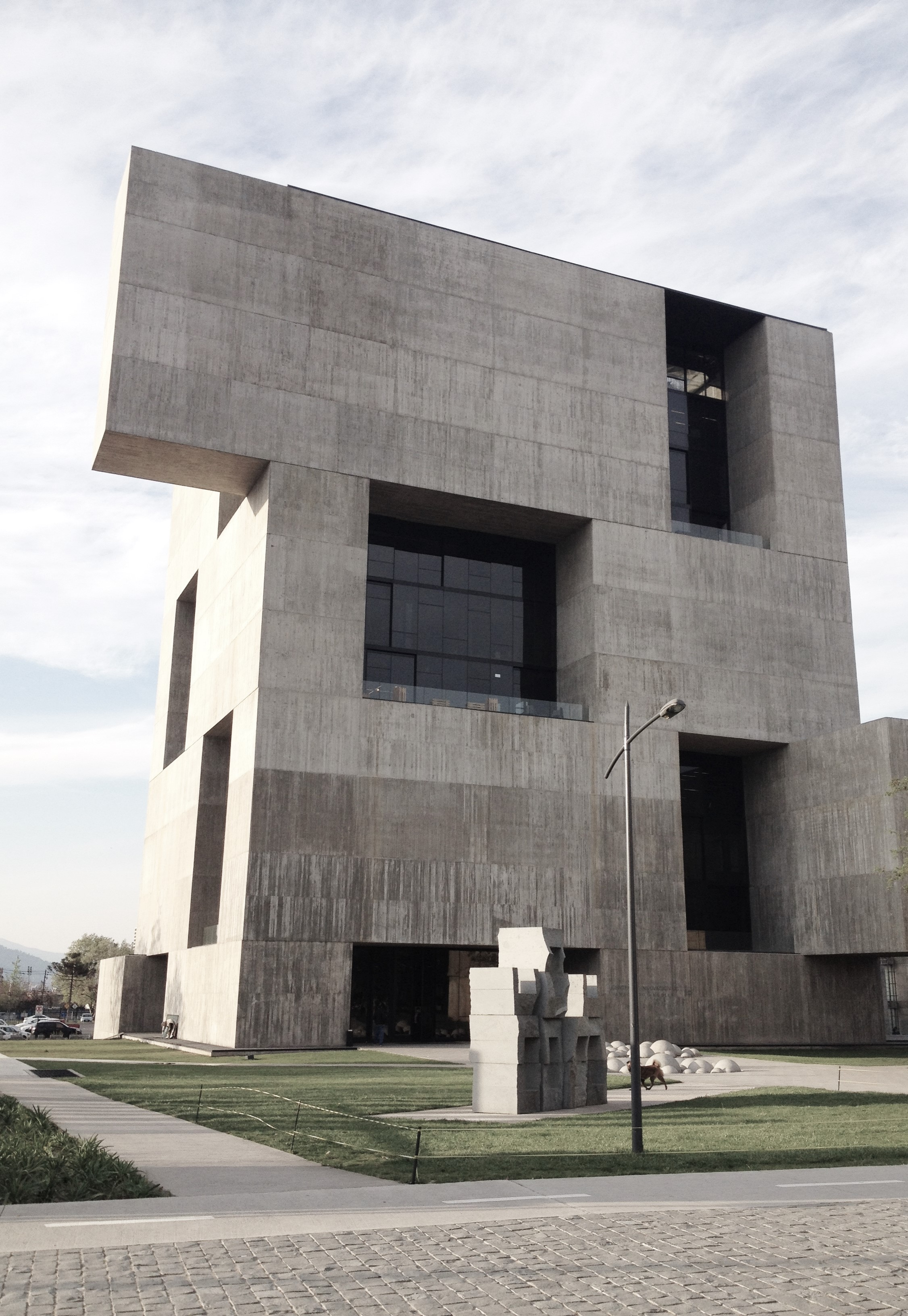
Anacleto Angelini Innovation Center, designed by Pritzker Alejandro Aravena and completed in 2014.

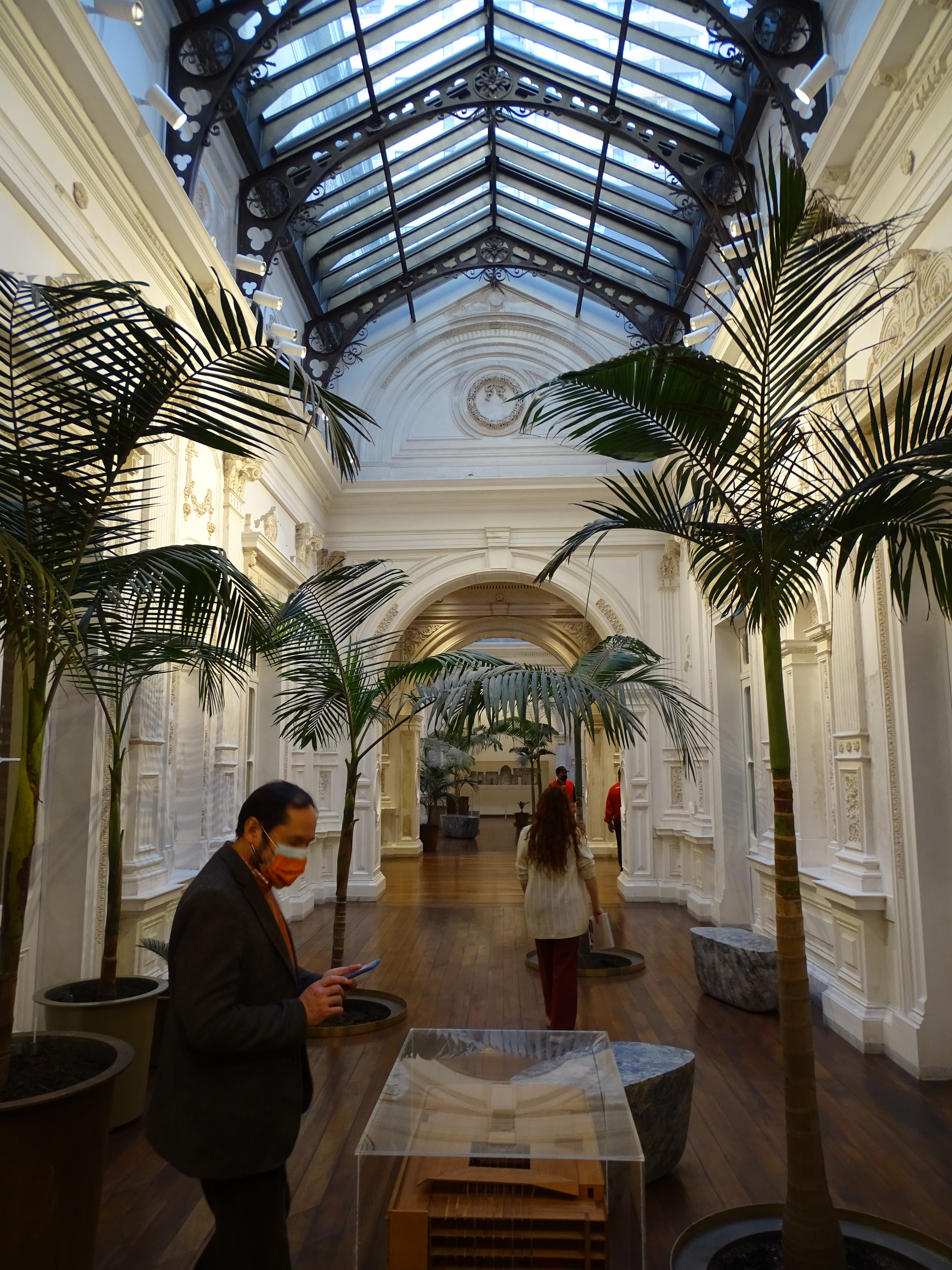
Pereira Palace, refurbished by Cecilia Puga, Paula Velasco and Alberto Moletto, completed in 2022.

Since the end of Pinochet's rule in the 1980s, a number of new architects have emerged in Chile, hoping to make new contributions to the construction of their motherland. At the late 1990s, Chile's cultural atmosphere is becoming more and more open and inclusive. The state has begun to re-assume the responsibility of public affairs and restore the basic welfare of society. The government has begun to attach importance to and invest heavily in public buildings and social housing.

=== Gran Torre Santiago ===
Despite frequent earthquakes in Chile, Gran Torre Santiago, the tallest building in South America is located in Santiago, the capital of Chile. The building is 300 m (980 ft) high, with 62 floors above ground and 6 floors underground. The height of each floor is 4.1 m (13 ft) and the building area is 107.125 m^{2} (1,153.08 sq ft). The designer not only increases the diagonal structure in the building to improve the building support force, but also penetrates the copper spring shock absorber into the main base and diagonal support steel column to cushion the damage of the building caused by the earthquake.

=== Templo Bahá'í ===
The Templo Baháʼí is a Bahá'í House of Worship nestled into the foothills of the Andes Mountains looking over the city of Santiago, Chile. Designed by Canadian architect Siamak Hariri, it was opened in 2016 and has since won many international and Canadian architectural awards. It is 30 m (98 ft) high and 30 m (98 ft) in diameter, and can accommodate 600 people. The most unique feature of this temple is its translucent reinforced concrete structure, which has an anti-seismic three-pendulum friction insulation system. The coating is made of alabaster and the outer coating is made of transparent molten glass.

=== Quinta Monroy ===
Quinta Monroy Housing was built as a social security house for a slum in 2004 in Iquique, a city in Chile. The local government provided a subsidy of $7,500 to 100 families. Therefore, ideally, on 5,000 m^{2} (54,000 sq ft) of land, each household can only build 36 m^{2} (390 sq ft) of housing; under normal circumstances, its cost is three times that of social security housing. The project's challenge is to find a way to complete the construction of social security housing with limited funds.

Alejandro Aravena, the project's architect, and his team have come up with a special type of building. As a building, land can be used very effectively; as a house, further expansion is possible. He provided these families with "semi-finished houses" that they could not build independently, while giving them space to improve their housing according to their respective economic conditions. Aravena won the 41st Pritzker Architecture Prize in 2016 for its design, becoming the first Chilean architect to win the prize.

== Religious buildings ==
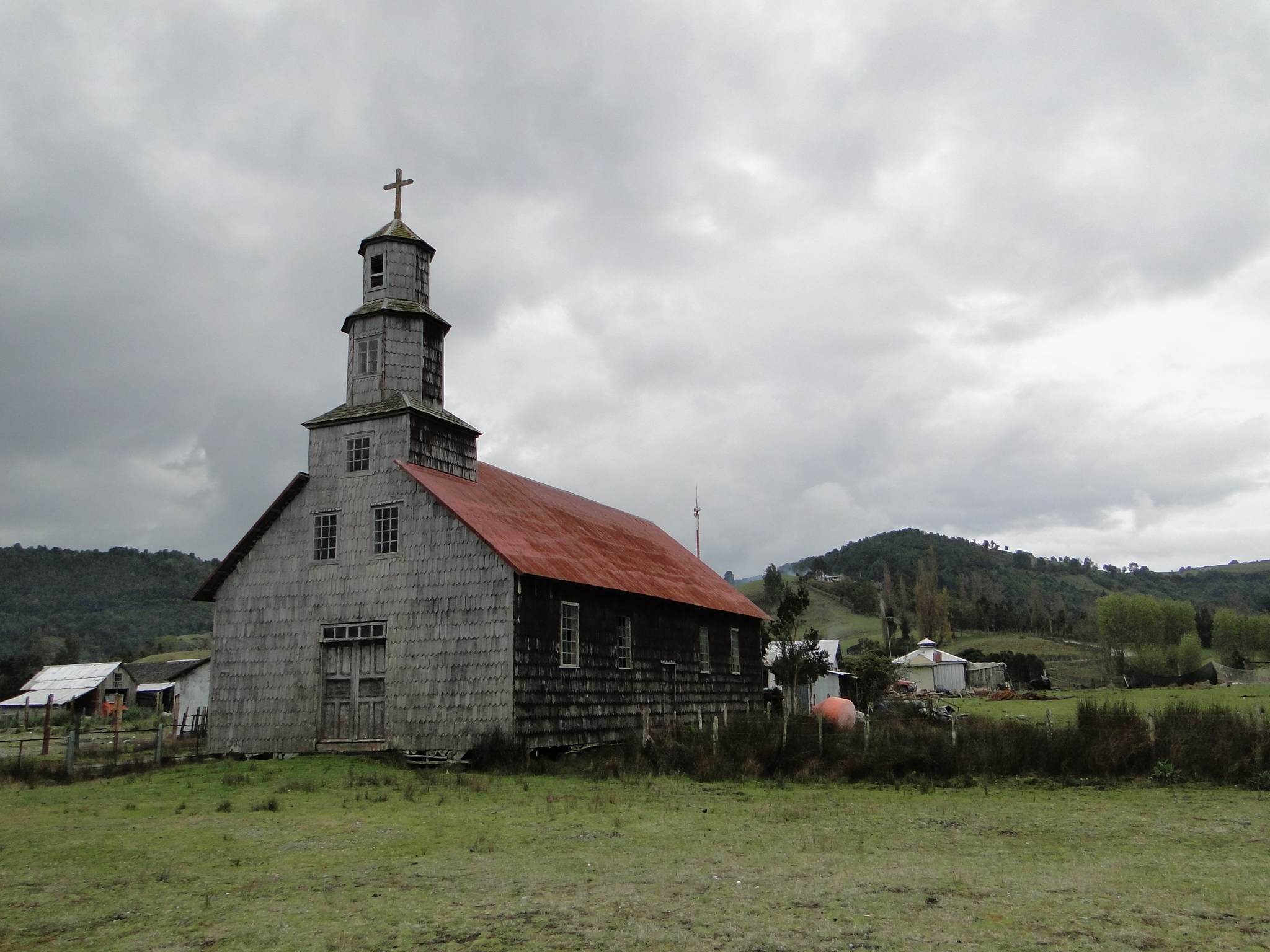
Churches of Chiloé

Chile established Catholicism as the state religion in 1831. The majority of Chileans, 68%, are Christian, and it is estimated that 54% of Chileans belong to the Catholic Church, while 14% belong to Protestant or Evangelical Churches; only 7% of the Chilean adhere to other religions. Agnostics, atheists, and those who disagree with any particular religion account for only 25% of the Chilean population. As a result, Chile has many Catholic church buildings.

=== The Churches of Chiloé ===
The Churches of Chiloé in Chiloé Islands are an outstanding representative of the unique Christian wood architecture of Latin America. These churches symbolize the cultural prosperity of the Chilean archipelago. They also witness the successful integration of local culture and European culture, the architecture and natural environment, and the organic value of local society. It is one of the most prominent styles of Chilota architecture. Unlike traditional Spanish colonial architecture, the Churches are made entirely of native wood and uses a large number of wooden tiles. These churches are built of materials to resist the humid and rainy ocean climate of Chiloe Archipelago.

== See also ==
- Chilotan architecture
- List of tallest buildings in Chile
