= National Monuments Council (Chile) =

Chilean government agency

- Consejo de Monumentos Nacionales
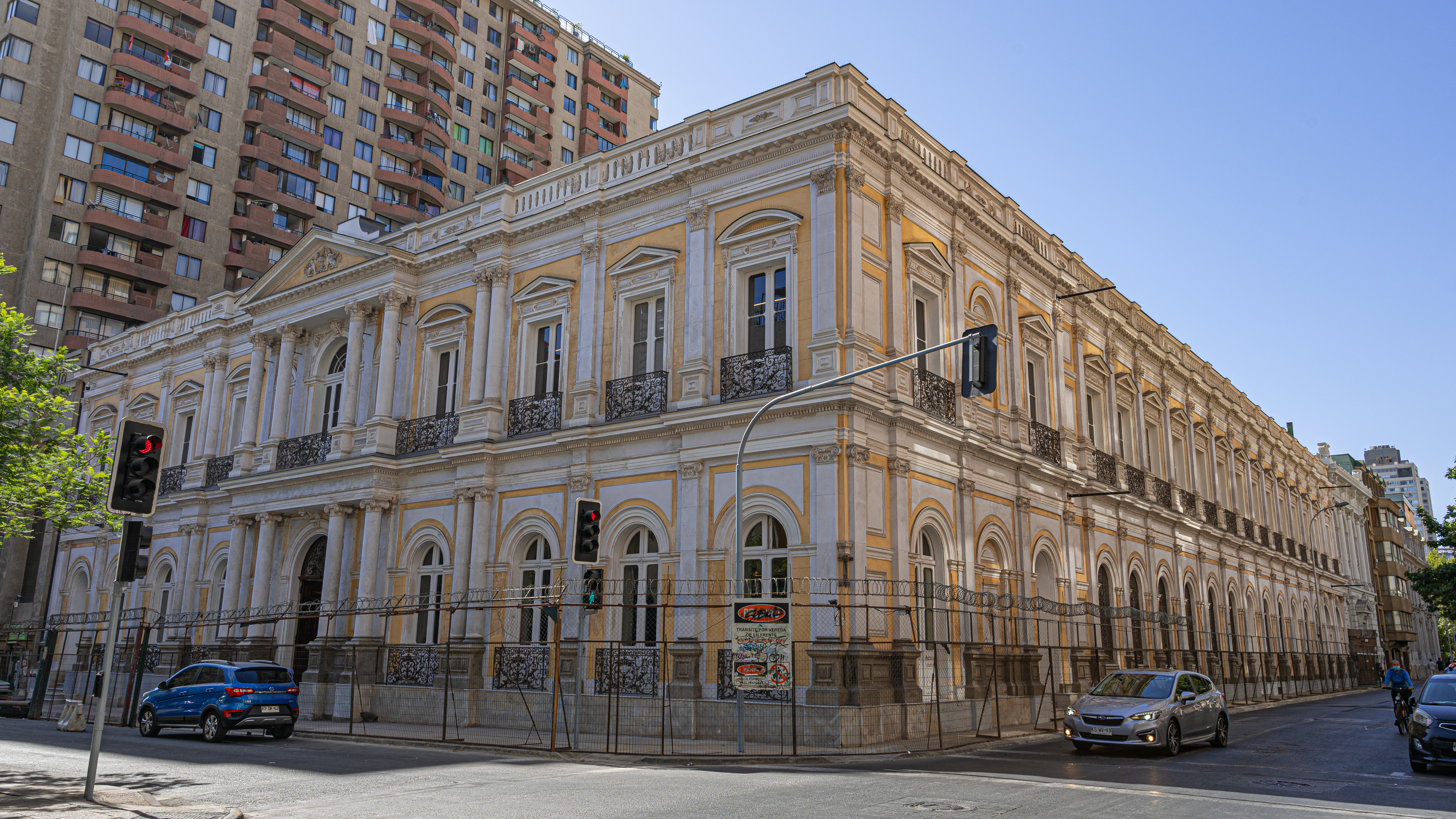
- Pereira Palace, headquarters of the council

Agency overview
- Formed: 1925
- Headquarters: 1515 Huérfanos Street, Santiago
- Annual budget: 5,777,509 thousand Chilean pesos (2020)
- Minister responsible: Ángel Cabeza
- Website: monumentos.cl

The National Monuments Council (Spanish: Consejo de Monumentos Nacionales) is a Chilean government agency dedicated to the preservation and upkeep of special natural, historical and cultural sites in Chile. It was created in 1925 by law 17,288 on National Monuments.

In 2022, the council's headquarters were moved to Pereira Palace.

== See also ==
- List of National Monuments of Chile
