= Quinta Monroy =

Housing complex in Iquique, Chile

- Status: Completed
- Location: Iquique, Chile
- Architect(s): ELEMENTAL
- Coordinates: 20°13′47″S 70°08′10″W
- Opened: 2003
- Number of Units: 93

Quinta Monroy is a 5,000 m^{2} multifamily affordable housing project in Iquique, Chile, designed by ELEMENTAL. Completed in 2003, the project consists of 93 homes and gained international attention for its incremental approach to housing. Each unit is a two-story structure equipped with the essential infrastructure of a home, leaving room for future expansion and customization by its residents.

== History ==
Located in Iquique, Chile, a city 1700 km north of Santiago with a population of 200,000, the Quinta Monroy Site is situated in a desirable area in the city center. Since the 1960s, the site was used as an informal housing settlement with 93 families illegally occupying the land. After the death of the former landlord in 2000, the tenants were threatened with eviction due to the land increasing three times its previous price. The residents appealed to the Chilean government, who called upon ELEMENTAL, led by Alejandro Aravena to create a housing solution for the residents. Governmental assistance from the Ministry of Housing and Urbanism (MINVU) through programs such as the Vivienda Social Dinámica sin Deuda (VSDsD) subsidies and the Chile Barrio housing program aided with the creation and funding of the Quinta Monroy Project. Through the VSDsD, Each family was given an equivalent of $10,000 USD with $2,500 going to land costs and $7,500 covering the price of the building costs.

Rather than relocating the tenants to a more affordable land on the periphery of the city, ELEMENTAL made the decision to keep the residents on the site, which would account for 70% of the project budget.

== Design ==
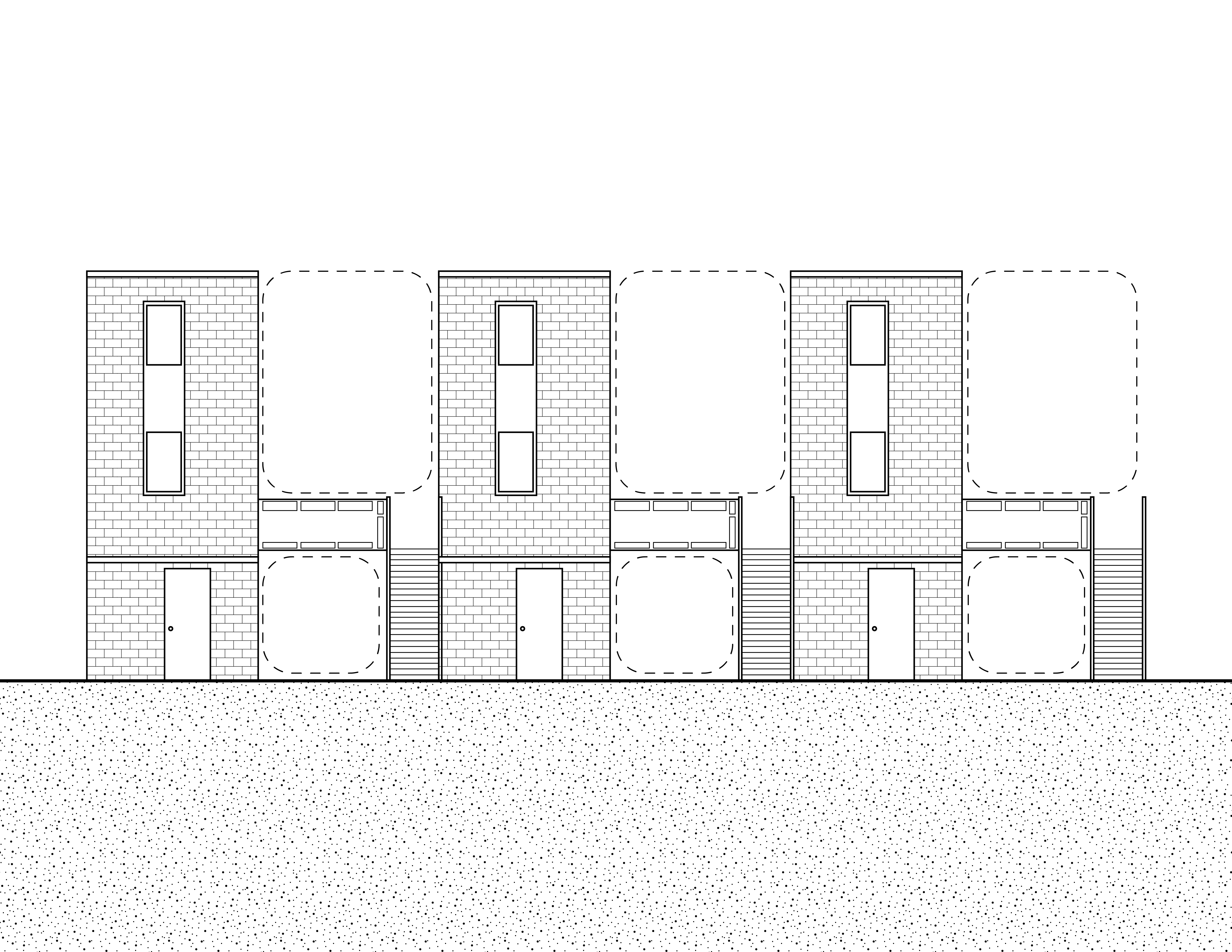
"Half a House" design approach with half of the structure built, leaving the other half available for modification and infill

With the little money left over, the project followed a “half-a-house” approach. Each 2-story unit was fitted with a kitchen, bathroom, various partition walls, timber stairs, and the essential infrastructure. The other half of the unit featured an exterior patio with roughly the same footprint as the built structure. This other half was left for residents to customize and expand. Different colors, finishes, walls, windows and rooms could all be added tailoring to the needs of the residents. The project has been viewed as an example of open urbanism.

The 93 apartments were laid out into 13 apartment blocks revolving around 4 communal courtyards, with two of the blocks facing the street.

Each unit sits on a reinforced concrete foundation and is composed of Concrete Masonry Units with a long vertical window at the front façade. The structure is in a minimalist, modern style.

== Legacy ==
Modifications of households began immediately after residents were given their homes and within one year of the project the value of each house doubled.

As of 2017, every apartment has been modified in some capacity. Modifications have extended past what ELEMENTAL had designed for, with nearly 31% of the apartments building additional structures that encroach onto the public courtyards. Almost half, or 49%, have built structures on the second floor that cantilever over public areas, and four of the apartments have added a third story. It is estimated that each apartment has increased by an average of 230%.

The Quinta Monroy project is seen as a successful example of participatory design and since its completion, ELEMENTAL has built more than 2,5000 incremental housing units.

Quinta Monroy received numerous accolades and praise, launching Aravena into prominence. The project helped Aravena earn the Pritzker Architecture Prize in 2016, the highest award an architect can receive.

== Criticism ==
Critics such as Camillo Boano and Francisco Vergara Perucich argue that the Quinta Monroy’s incremental housing strategy is a neoliberal economic strategy that shifts the burden of housing completion onto low-income residents. Boano and Vergara Perucich state that the housing model is flawed as it integrates the poor into a capitalist market through the self-financing of home expansions. They question “Why should the poor receive a half-house instead of a proper one?”

Moreover, Many additions to the apartments use low-durable and poor quality materials similar to the slum like conditions seen in the previous informal settlement. Public spaces such as the four courtyards have been increasingly privatized, with many residents building on uncontested areas on the site.
