= Cecilia Puga =

Chilean architect (born 1961)

- Born: 1961 (age 64–65); Santiago, Chile
- Education: Pontifical Catholic University of Chile
- Occupation: Architect
- Notable work: Pereira Palace refurbishment

Cecilia Puga (born 1961) is a Chilean architect, educator and the director of the Chilean Museum of Pre-Columbian Art.

She is recognized by certain circles as a noteworthy architectural designer of the latest generations in Chile. Puga has won the international architecture competition for projects such as the recovery of Pereira Palace, the new Library of the Faculty of Architecture, Design and Urban Studies of the Pontificia Universidad Católica de Chile and the City Hall of Vitacura, Chile.

== Career ==
Puga studied architecture at the Pontifical Catholic University of Chile and the Università della Sapienza. Prior to establishing her own firm in 1995, she worked as editor of Revista CA, the official magazine of the College of Architects of Chile.

As founder of Cecilia Puga Arquitectos, her professional work has been exhibited in Chile and the United States and includes single-family houses, an apartment building, interiors of shops and offices, a chapel, and the master plan for the recovery of old buildings of the Southern Cone Vineyard in Chimbarongo.

In 2009, her studio was one of the 100 offices worldwide selected by Herzog & de Meuron to design a villa in Inner Mongolia in the context of the Ordos 100 project. One year later, the 2G: International Architecture Review series dedicated the monograph number 53 to her work.

For the 2012 Venice Biennale, she was invited to be part of Valerio Olgiati’s installation named Pictographs - Statements of contemporary architects. Four years later, Puga was part of the International Architecture Exhibition for the 2016 Venice Biennale of Architecture, invited by Director Alejandro Aravena.

In 2014, Puga, alongside Chilean architects Paula Velasco and Alberto Moletto, won the international architecture competition for the recovery of Pereira Palace, an abandoned 19th-century neoclassical mansion turned into Ministry of Cultures in Chile.

Since 2020, Puga is the director of the Chilean Museum of Pre-Columbian Art.
