= Pereira Palace =

Coordinates: 33.4400°S 70.6583°W

Palacio Pereira
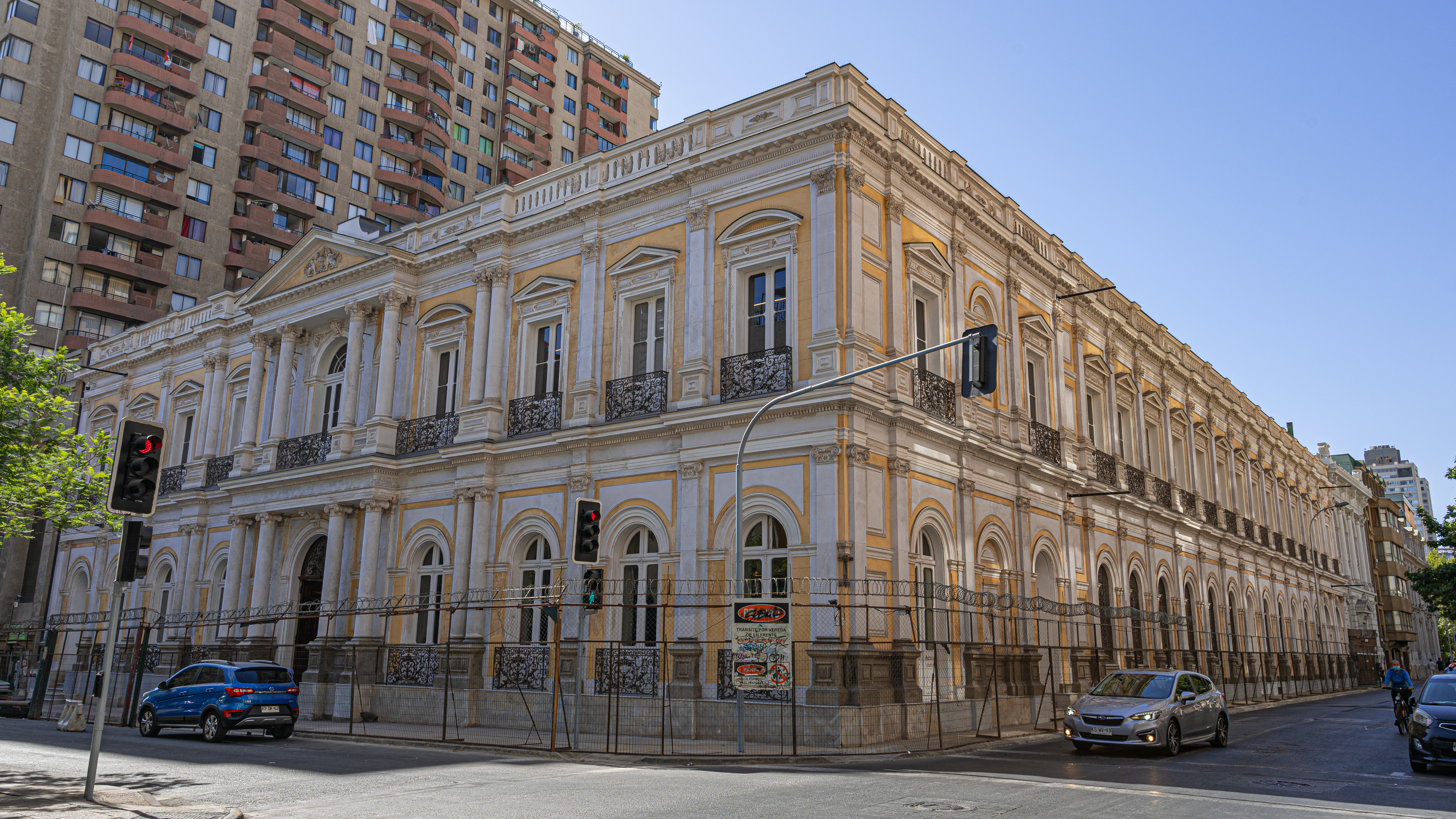
- Interactive map of Palacio Pereira

General information
- Location: 1515 Huérfanos Street, Santiago, Chile

Design and construction
- Architect: Lucien Henault

The Palacio Pereira is a historic neoclassical mansion located at the corner of San Martín and Huérfanos streets, in downtown Santiago, Chile. Built in the second half of the 19th century, it was declared a National Historic Monument in 1981, but this didn't prevent its deterioration.

In 2011, under the first presidency of Sebastián Piñera, the government bought the building to transform it into the headquarters for the Dirección de Bibliotecas, Archivos y Museos (DIBAM) and the Consejo de Monumentos Nacionales (CMN). In 2012 an open call for an architectural competition for a preliminary restoration project was launched. The winning project, proposed by the architectural firm led by Cecilia Puga, was announced in December 2012, during the XVII Biennale of Architecture. In 2014 the architectural design by Puga, Alberto Moletto and Paula Velasco was completed. The project was completed in 2020.

The palace, along with the Former National Congress Building, served as headquarters of the Convención Constitucional, the Chile's constitutional redrafting group after the national plebiscite regarding this issue held in October 2020.

== History ==
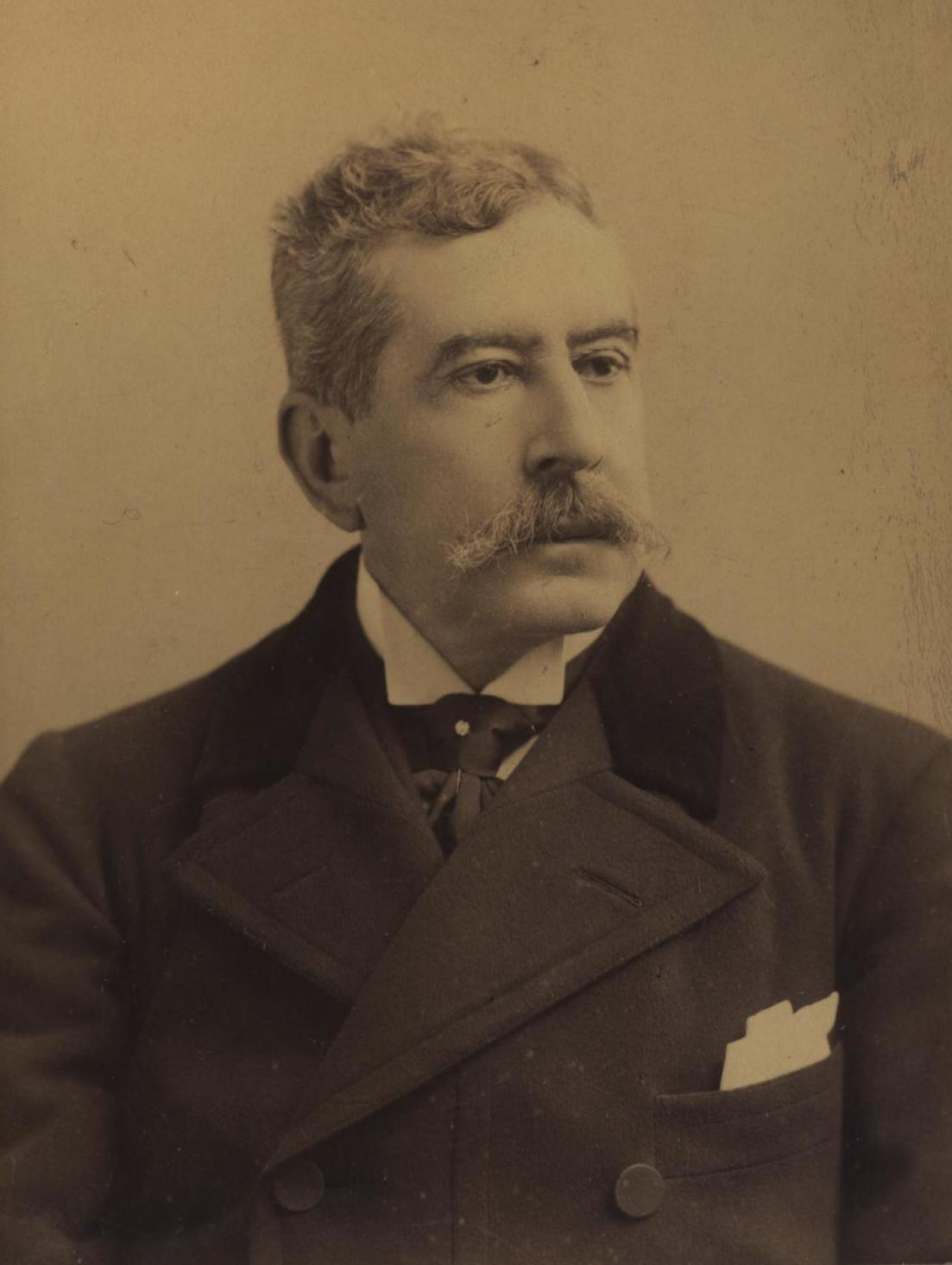
Luis Pereira Cotapos (1905).

Luis Pereira Cotapos, a wealthy lawyer, wine company owner and Chilean politician, wanted to build a palatial house similar to those found in the Barrio Dieciocho. He bought a property owned by the heirs of Juana Varela in 1872, which consisted of farms and vineyards dating from 1793.

In 1872, Luis Pereira commissioned French architect Lucien Hénault to design and build his new house on that land, who was considered to be one of the most prominent architects in Santiago de Chile since his arrival in 1856, accompanied by the then minister Manuel Blanco Encalada. The Pereira Palace was the last work of the French architect in Chile before returning to his country of origin.

Luis Pereira resided in his mansion until his death in 1909. His widow, Carolina Iñiguez Vicuña, continued to live there until her death in 1932. That year the property was sold to the Archdiocese of Santiago, serving as the headquarters of the Caja de Ahorros de Empleados Públicos from 1940 to 1950. Later the building was leased by the Ministry of Education, beginning its deterioration phase when it was altered to serve as a high school (Liceo N° 3 de Niñas) between 1950 and 1968.

In 1969 the palace housed the Centro Humanístico Científico Santiago Centro, also known as Liceo 26. The 1971 Aconcagua earthquake severely damaged the building, and from October 1972 the Ministry of Education destined it to house student organizations such as the Federación de Estudiantes Secundarios de Santiago (FESES), the Federación de Estudiantes Industriales y Técnicos de Santiago (FEITES) and the Federación de Izquierda de Estudiantes Particulares (FIEP), as well as the Frente de Estudiantes Revolucionarios (FER), the student branch of the Revolutionary Left Movement (MIR).

Following the 1973 Chilean coup d'état, the Inmobiliaria San Luis acquired the palace, subdividing it into several stores for rent, damaging the building. In 1981 it was purchased by Inmobiliaria Maullín —owned by Raúl del Río—. The building was declared a National Monument of Chile in 1974, losing this designation the following year, and then declared again a National Monument in 1981, when it already was in a deplorable state of neglect. Its ruined status worsened with the 1985 Algarrobo earthquake.

=== Restoration ===
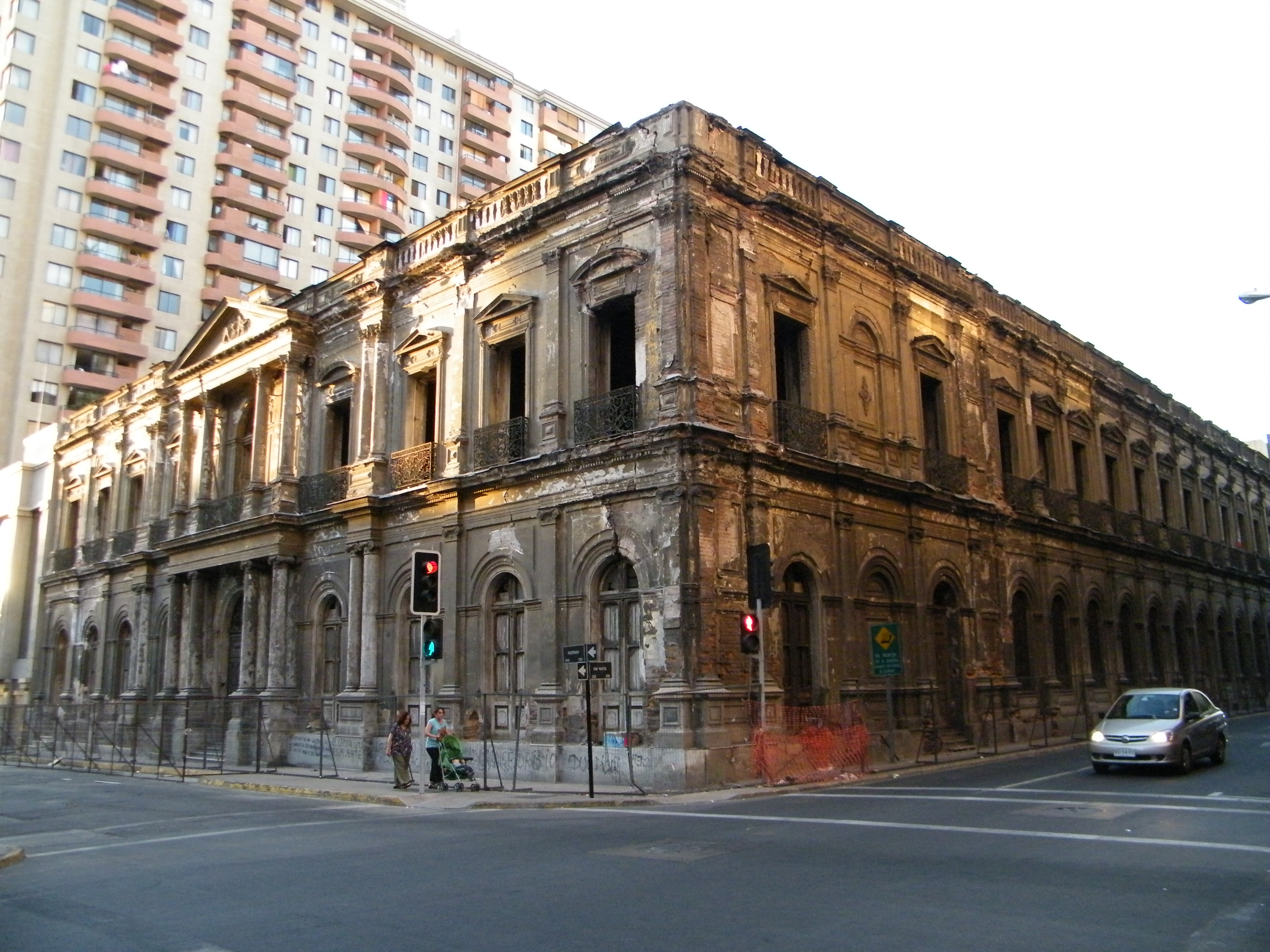
The Pereira Palace in 2010.

A restoration project was undertaken between 2016 and 2019. The works were executed by the Constructora Cosal, Proyectos y Rehabilitaciones Kalam, from Spain, and Inmobiliaria La Viña. The project was awarded to the team of the architect Cecilia Puga, along with Paula Velasco and Alberto Moletto, and was executed and financed by the Ministry of Public Works, through its Architecture Department. The works began in July 2016 with a budget of more than $ 16 billion. The objective was to recover the existing building and at the same time create a new space that would coexist harmoniously with this construction and environment.

The restoration project includes the removal of the superficial layer of paint on the walls, leaving exposed the original colors.

Another planned task is the construction, on an empty plot of land adjacent to the original building, of a reinforced concrete structure with five above-ground stories and two basement levels, adding 4675 m² of floor space for the offices of the Dirección de Bibliotecas, Archivos y Museos (DIBAM) and the Consejo de Monumentos Nacionales (CMN); thus, the palace will have a total floor area of 6467 m². Its completion was estimated to be in December 2019.

On January 11, 2021 it was announced that the palace will be used as a place of work for the Constitutional Convention, people elected to write a new constitution for Chile. The building will have 15 offices with 102 desks, and 11 meeting rooms with a total capacity of 132 seats, in addition to a larger meeting room with a capacity of 40 people; the fourth level will accommodate a dining room.

== Architecture ==
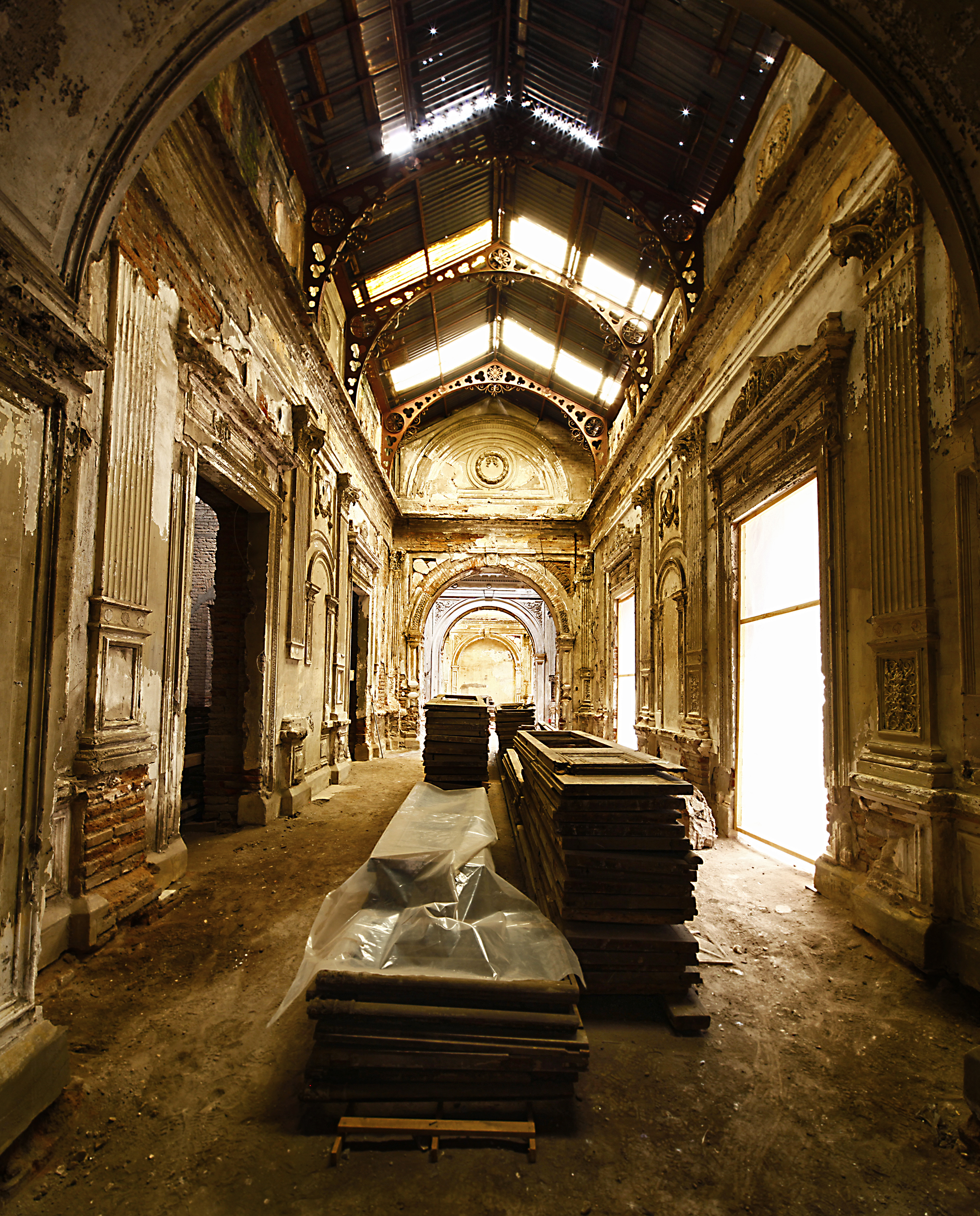
Interior of the Palacio Pereira in 2012.

In 1872, the French architect Lucien Hénault was appointed by Luis Pereira Cotapos to design and built the palace.

The building as designed had a floor area of 2,100 m^{2} (23,000 sq ft) and two stories in height. It is built of brick. The facade fronting Huérfanos Street features semicircular windows and Ionic pilasters on the first level, and pedimented windows on the second, alternating triangular and curve pediments. The main entrance, which includes a carved wood door, is framed by a two-tier pedimented portico, with paired Ionic columns at the first level and paired Corinthian columns at the second. The exterior windows were originally protected by wrought-iron grilles. The San Martín Street façade is longer and more uniform, repeating some elements of the main facade.

Two intersecting interior corridors, covered with glass roofs, divide the building into four sections.

The interior of the building features decorative plaster moldings. It had at least 12 large rooms, mostly with silk-covered walls. The gallery had a floor made of various kinds of marble and parquet.
