= Incas in Central Chile =

Aspect of pre-colonial Chilean history (1470s–1530s)

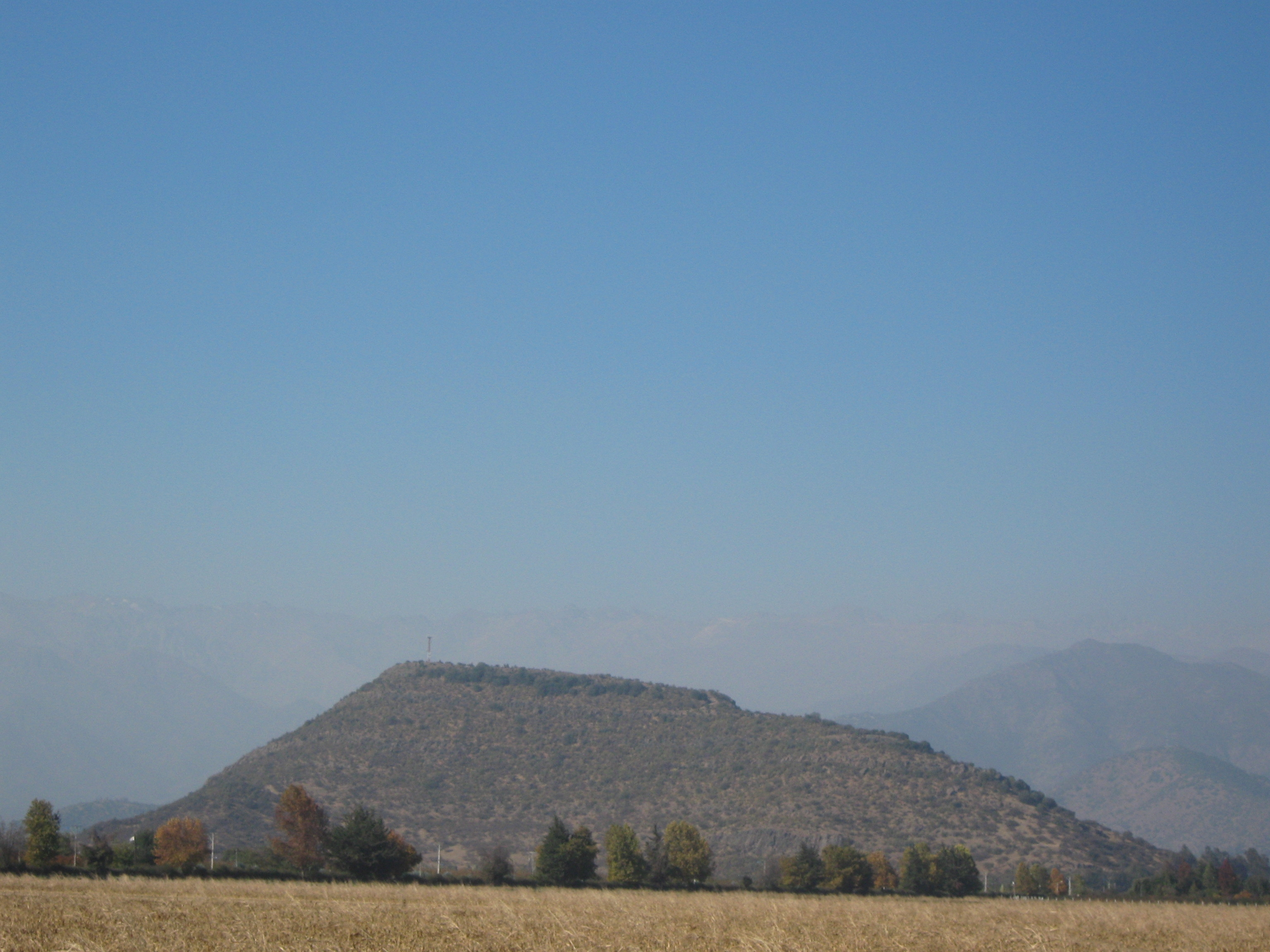
Cerro Grande de La Compañía hosting one of the southernmost fortresses of the Inca Empire.

Inca rule in Chile was brief, lasting from the 1470s to the 1530s when the Inca Empire was absorbed by Spain. The main settlements of the Inca Empire in Chile lay along the Aconcagua, Mapocho and Maipo rivers. Quillota in Aconcagua Valley was likely the Incas' foremost settlement. The bulk of the people conquered by the Incas in Central Chile were Diaguitas and part of the Promaucae (also called Picunches). Incas appear to have distinguished between a "province of Chile" and a "province of Copayapo" neighboring it to the north. (Note: The name and location of the "province of Copayapo" coincides with the toponym Copiapó.) In Aconcagua Valley the Incas settled people from the areas of Arequipa and possibly also the Lake Titicaca.

== Inca expansion ==
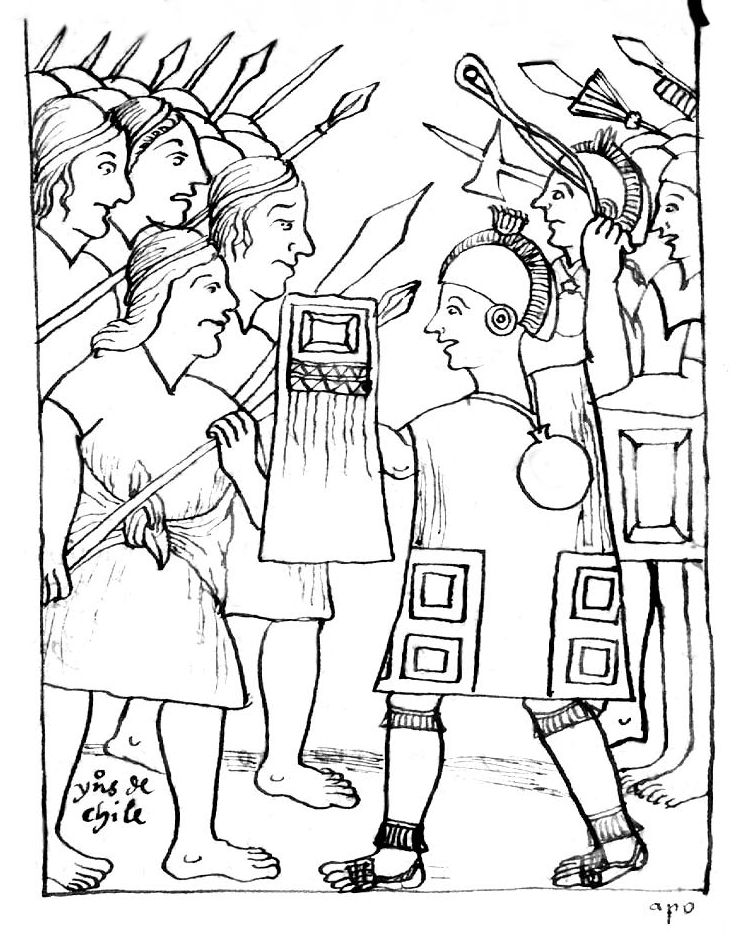
Huamán Poma de Ayala's drawing of the confrontation between the Mapuches (left) and the Incas (right).

The exact date of the conquest of Central Chile by the Inca Empire is not known. A study of ceramics from 2014 suggest Inca influence in Central Chile begun as early as 1390. Nevertheless, it is generally accepted that Central Chile was conquered during the reign of Topa Inca Yupanqui and most early Spanish chronicles point out that conquest occurred in the 1470s.

Beginning with 19th-century historians Diego Barros Arana and José Toribio Medina, various scholars have pointed out that the incorporation of Central Chile to the Inca Empire was a gradual process. Nevertheless, it is generally accepted that incorporation into the empire was through warfare which caused a severe depopulation in the Transverse Valleys of Norte Chico, the Diaguita homeland. Chronicler Diego de Rosales tells of an anti-Inca rebellion in the Diaguita lands of Coquimbo and Copiapó concurrent with the Inca Civil War. This rebellion would have been brutally repressed by the Incas who gave rebels "great chastise".

One theory claims Central Chile was conquered by the Inca Empire from the east after Inca troops crossed the Andes at Valle Hermoso (32º22' S) and Uspallata Pass (32º50' S). This attack from the east would have been done in order to avoid the more direct but inhospitable routes crossing the Atacama Desert. José Toribio Medina claimed in 1882 that the Incas entered Central Chile from both north and east.

Troops of the Inca Empire are reported to have reached Maule River and had a battle with Mapuches from Maule River and Itata River there. Yet, the location of the battle is uncertain with historian Osvaldo Silva conjecturing it close to Concepción.

=== Battle of the Maule ===
The battle of Maule refers to a battle that took place in connection to Inca expansion into Central Chile. The main account is that of Garcilaso de la Vega a chronicler of Inca and Spanish descent.

Historian Osvaldo Silva disputes the vicinities of Maule River as the location of the battle claiming instead that the battle could have occurred anywhere between Maipo and Bío Bío rivers, while he is inclined locate to battle close to Concepción at the mouth of Bío Bío River.

The traditional view based on the writings of Garcilaso de la Vega hold that the battle of the Maule halted Inca advance. However, Osvaldo Silva suggest instead that it was the social and political framework of the Mapuche that posed the main difficulty in imposing imperial rule. (Note: In a similar manner José Bengoa claims that a contributing factor to the Arauco War between Spaniards and Mapuches was the lack a tradition of forced labour like the Andean mita among the Mapuches who largely refused to serve the Spanish.)

==== Account of Garcilaso de la Vega ====
After securing the regions of northern Chile, Copiapó, Coquimbo, Aconcagua and the Maipo Valley around what is now Santiago, the Inca general Sinchiruca sent 20,000 men down to the valley of the Maule River. The Picunche people, who inhabited this last region south of Maipo Valley up to the Itata River, refused to submit to the rule of the Inca and called on their allies south of the Maule; the Antalli, Pincu, and Cauqui to join in opposing these invaders. This defiance gave them their distinctive name of Purumaucas from the Quechua words purum awqa meaning "savage enemy". The Spanish later corrupted the name into Promaucaes.

The Incas crossed the Maule River, and keeping their old custom, they sent messengers to require these Purumaucas to submit to the rule of the Inca or resort to arms. The Purumaucas had determined to die before losing their freedom and responded that the victors would be masters of the defeated and that the Incas would quickly see how the Purumaucas obeyed. Three or four days after this answer, the Purumaucas and their allies arrived and camped in front of the Incas' camp with 18,000 - 20,000 warriors. The Incas tried diplomacy, offering peace and friendship, claiming they were not going to take their land and property but to give them a way to live as men. The Purumaucas responded saying that they came not to waste time in vain words and reasoning, but to fight until they won or died. The Incas promised battle the next day.

The following day both armies left their camps and fought all day without either gaining an advantage and both suffering many wounded and dead. At night they both retired to their positions. On the second and third day they fought with the same results. At the end of the third day of battle, both factions saw that they had lost more than half their number in dead, and the living were almost all wounded. On the fourth day, neither side left their own camp, which had been fortified, as they hoped to defend them if their opponents attacked. The fifth and sixth days were passed in the same manner but by the seventh the Purumaucas and their allies retired and returned home claiming victory.

== Southern border of the Empire ==
The southern border of the Inca Empire is believed by most modern scholars to be situated between Santiago and Maipo River or somewhere between Santiago and Maule River. The traditional view among Chilean historians and historians of the Inca Empire is that Maule River was the frontier. This view was first presented by William Prescott in 1847 and then followed by Miguel Luis Amunátegui, Diego Barros Arana, Ricardo E. Latcham, Francisco Antonio Encina and Grete Mostny. Contrary to this, a frontier at Maipo River was first argued in modern times by José Toribio Medina in 1882, being joined later by Jaime Eyzaguirre and Osvaldo Silva. Some early Spanish conquistadors also suggest the Maipo River or a nearby area as boundary including Pedro Mariño de Lobera, Hernando de Santillán, Gerónimo de Quiroga, Jerónimo de Vivar and Pedro de Valdivia's letter to Charles V, Holy Roman Emperor.

On the other hand, Spanish chroniclers Miguel de Olavarría and Diego de Rosales claimed instead the Inca frontier lay much more to the south at the Bío Bío River. Regardless of these differing claims on the frontier of the Inca Empire, Inca troops appear to have never crossed Bío Bío River. As in the case in the other borders of the Inca Empire, the southern border was composed of multiple zones. First an inner fully incorporated zone with mitimaes protected by a line of pukaras (fortresses) and then an outer zone with Inca pukaras scattered among allied tribes. This outer zone would have been located between Maipo and Maule rivers.

== Farthest point reached by the Incas ==
Beginning with José Toribio Medina historians have made a distinction between the places reached by the Incas and the actual zone incorporated to imperial rule.

While historian José Bengoa concludes that Inca troops apparently never crossed Bío Bío River, chronicler Diego de Rosales gives an account of the Incas crossing the river going south all the way to La Imperial and returning north through Tucapel along the coast. In Osvaldo Silva's reconstruction of the events leading to the battle of the Maule the Incas may have reached as far south as the Concepción area next to Bío Bío River in the early 1530s before returning north.

Inca yanakuna are believed by archaeologists Tom Dillehay and Américo Gordon to have extracted gold south of the Inca frontier in free Mapuche territory. Following this thought, the main motive for Inca expansion into Mapuche territory would have been to access gold mines. The knowledge and use of gold among Mapuches however did not begin with the Incas as Mapuche culture had its own word, milla, and cultural significance for gold for before Inca expansion. Dillehay and Gordon also claim all early Mapuche pottery at Valdivia is of Inca design. Inca influence is possibly evidenced as far south as Osorno Province (latitude 40–41° S) in the form of Quechua and Quechua–Aymara toponyms. Alternatively these toponyms originated in colonial times from the population of the Valdivian Fort System that served as a penal colony linked to the Peruvian port of El Callao.

== Impact ==
=== Diaguita society ===
The Incas influenced the Diaguitas who adopted pottery designs from Cuzco and Inca techniques in agriculture and metalworking.

The Inca Empire appear to have uprooted so-called Tomatas copiapoes from the Diaguita lands and settled this group near Tarija in southern Bolivia. The Churumatas were instead transferred the other way round, from the vicinities of Tarija to Elqui Valley.

Around Elqui Valley almost all indigenous toponymy belongs either to Quechua or Mapuche. There is no Diaguita (Kakan) toponymy known in the valley. Quechua toponymy is related to the valleys incorporation to the Inca Empire in the late 15th and early 16th-century. Some Mapuche toponymy posdates Inca rule, but other is likely to be coeval or precede it.

=== Mapuche society ===
Through their contact with Inca invaders Mapuches would have for the first time met people with state organization. Their contact with the Incas gave them a collective awareness distinguishing between them and the invaders and uniting them into loose geo-political units despite their lack of state organization.

Gold and silver bracelets and "sort of crowns" were used by Mapuches in the Concepción area at the time of the Spanish arrival as noted by Jerónimo de Vivar. This is interpreted either as Inca gifts, war spoils from defeated Incas, or adoption of Inca metallurgy. The Incas are credited with the introduction of adobe buildings in Central Chile.

As result of Inca rule in Chile Mapuche language adopted many loanwords from Imperial Quechua. However some words that may appear Quechua loanwords such as antu (sun), calcu (warlock), cuyen (moon) and chadi (salt) are actually more likely much older loanwords from the Puquina language. (Note: The Puquina language has also influenced Quechua, hence the confusion. It has been suggested that the collapse of the Tiwanaku Empire 1000 CE caused a southward migratory wave leading to a Pre-Inca Central Andean influence on Mapuche society and language.)

== Road network ==
The Incas used an extensive road network in Chile as well as in the rest of the empire. North of Copiapó Valley the main difficulty for the Inca road system was the lack of water, south of Copiapó Valley the main difficulty was the uneven relief with many mountain ranges and valleys. To deal with these problems the Incas adopted two strategies and built two north–south roads from Copiapó Valley to Maipo Valley each of these according to a strategy. One road, the Longitudinal Andean Inca Road (Spanish: Camino Inca Longidunal Andino), went high in the Andes through the valley heads where the valleys were less deep. The other one followed coastal plains.

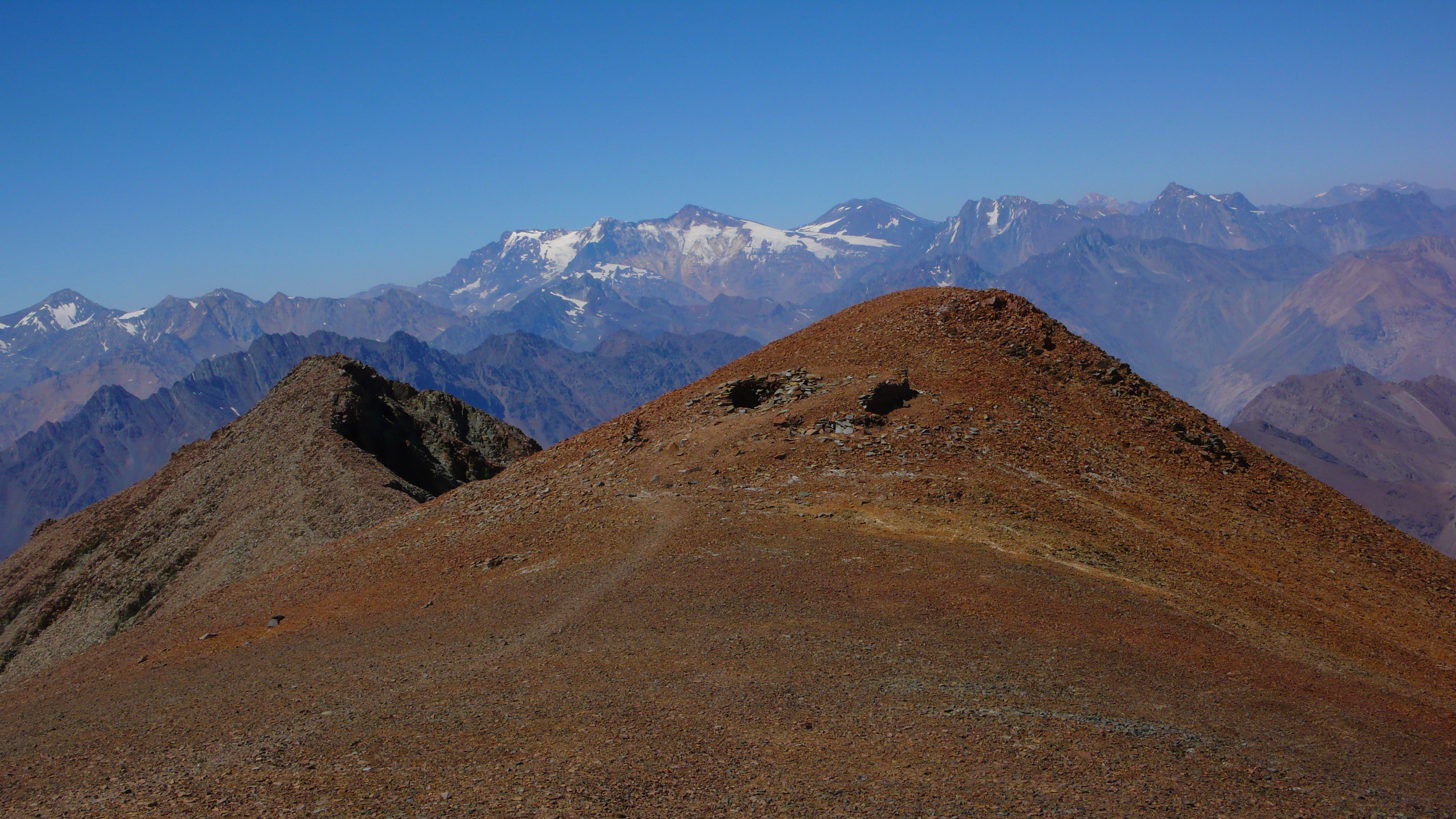
View of an Inca archaeological site at Cerro El Plomo, a mountain and Inca ceremonial centre in Central Chile.

The Longitudinal Andean Inca Road runs from the latitude of Huasco Valley north–south mainly along a series of geological faults (including Valeriano Fault). From a latitude of 28° S to 30° S it this road runs above 4,000 m.a.s.l. close to the Argentine–Chilean border. Around the latitude of Choapa Valley the road descends to around 2,000 m.a.s.l. Several roads that crosses the Andean water divide connects the Longitudinal Andean Inca Road to a parallel Inca road in Argentina. The Longitudinal Andean Inca Road allowed to access several mining districts and had plenty of water. On the other hand, its climate is of a large diurnal temperature range and it was not accessible in winter due to snowfall.

The coastal road allowed for a more straight north–south movement. It also enjoyed a less harsh climate than the Longitudinal Andean Inca Road and was accessible the all year round. This road goes mostly ca. 30 km east of the Pacific Ocean but it also access the sea at some places. It was the route used by Diego de Almagro in 1536.

== See also ==
- Huaca de Chena
- Pucara del Cerro La Muralla
- Pukara of La Compañía
- The Chilean Inca Trail

== Bibliography ==
- Ampuero Brito, Gonzalo (1978). Cultura diaguita (in Spanish). Departamento de Extensión Cultural del Ministerio de Educación.
- Bengoa, José (2003). Historia de los antiguos mapuches del sur (in Spanish). Santiago: Catalonia. ISBN 956-8303-02-2.
- Mostny, Grete (1983) [1981]. Prehistoria de Chile (in Spanish) (6th ed.). Santiago de Chile: Editorial Universitaria.
- Stehberg, Rubén (1995). Instalaciones incaicas en el norte y centro de Chile (PDF) (in Spanish). Santiago: Dirección de Bibliotecas, Archivos y Museos. ISBN 956-244-035-4.
- Villalobos, Sergio; Silva, Osvaldo; Silva, Fernando; Estelle, Patricio (1974). Historia De Chile (in Spanish)(14th ed.). Editorial Universitaria. ISBN 956-11-1163-2.
- Inca Garcilaso de la Vega, Comentarios reales, Segunda Parte : Libro VII, Cap. 18, 19, 20.
- Vicente Carvallo y Goyeneche, Descripcion Histórico Geografía del Reino de Chile (Description Historical Geography of the Kingdom of Chile), PDF E Libros from Memoria Chilena (History of Chile 1542-1788)
