= List of archaeological sites in Chile =

Archaeological sites are distributed throughout all regions of Chile.

Site	Region	Associated culture	Type	Age	References
Atacama Giant	Atacama		Geoglyph	ca 1000–1400 CE	
Pucará de Quitor	Atacama	Atacameño	Pukara	ca 1100 CE	
Tulor	Atacama	Atacameño	Settlement	380 BCE–1200 CE	
Easter Island	Polynesia	Rapanui	Various	ca 300–1700 CE	
Huaca de Chena	Central Chile	Promaucae–Inca	Huaca	1380–1450 CE	
Pukara de La Compañia	Central Chile	Promaucae–Inca	Pukara	1380–1450 CE	
Pucara del Cerro La Muralla	Central Chile	Inca	Pukara		
Mocha Island	Southern Chile	Mapuche, Polynesians			
Purén	Southern Chile	Mapuche	Mounds		
Raised fields of Budi Lake	Southern Chile	Mapuche	Raised fields		
Chan-Chan	Southern Chile	Chanchaense Complex	Camp	6,420–5,730 BP	
Pilauco Bajo	Southern Chile			11,000–12,500 BP	
Monte Verde	Southern Chile		Settlement	13,500 BP	
Madre de Dios Island	Patagonia	Kaweshkar	Cave paintings		
Pali-Aike	Patagonia		Camp		
Cueva Fell	Patagonia		Camp		

- Caleta Wulaia
- Guarelo Island
- Juan Fernández Islands
- Los Lagos
- Mulchén
- Port Famine
- Purén
- San Pedro de Atacama
