= Battle of the Maule =

1471 battle between The Mapuche and Inca Empire

Coordinates: 35°34′10.36″S 71°41′53.95″W

- Part of the Inca Empire wars of conquest
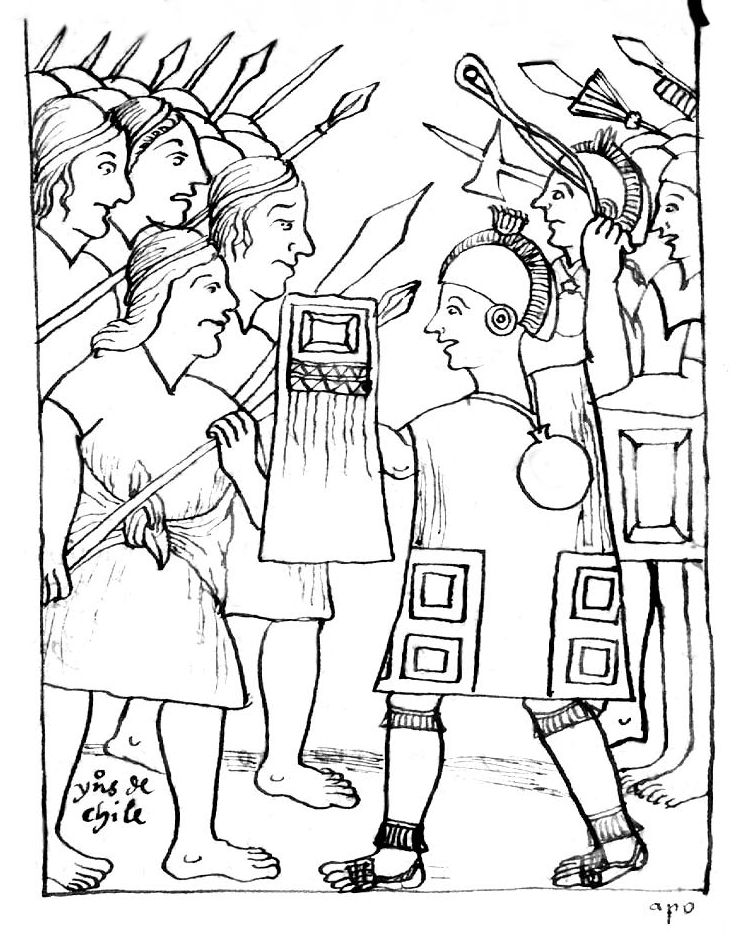
- Huamán Poma de Ayala's picture about the confrontation between the Mapuches (left) and the Incas (right)
Date	Probably at some time between 1471 and 1493, or 1532
Location	Unknown, probably near the Maule River, Cachapoal River or Biobío River
Result	Undefined (Stalemate?)

Belligerents
Inca Empire	Mapuche Purumaucas and their Antalli, Pincu, and Cauqui allies

Commanders and leaders
Emperor Túpac Yupanqui; General Sinchiruca	Curillanca †; Huaraculén; Loncomilla; Butahue; Llanquinao

Strength
20,000	18,000–20,000

Casualties and losses
Over 10,000 wounded or killed	Over 9,000-10,000 Wounded or killed

The Battle of the Maule was fought between a coalition of Mapuche people of Chile and the Inca Empire of Peru. Traditionally this battle is held to have occurred near what is now Maule River, in Central Chile. The account of Garcilaso de la Vega depicts the three-day battle, which is generally believed to have occurred in the reign of Tupac Inca Yupanqui (1471-93 CE).

Historian Osvaldo Silva conjectures instead the battle occurred much after Tupac Inca Yupanqui's conquest of northern Chile with 1532 being a possible date. Silva claims the battle was not decisive at all as the Inca army was already in retreat from a new incursion to Mapuche lands in the south. Arguably the Inca's advances in Chile were halted by their unwillingness to commit greater resources in fighting the Mapuche.

== Account of Garcilaso de la Vega ==
In a six-year campaign with an army that eventually rose to 50,000 men, the Inca general Sinchiruca had subdued the regions of northern Chile, Copiapó, Coquimbo, Aconcagua, and the Maipo Valley around what is now Santiago. After securing the Maipo Valley, Sinchiruca sent 20,000 men down to the valley of the Maule River. The territory of the Picunche people inhabiting this last region south of Maipo Valley extended further to the south to the Itata River, and these people south of the Maipo Valley had refused to submit to the rule of the Inca and called on their allies south of the Maule; the Antalli, Pincu, and Cauqui to join in opposing these invaders. This defiance gave them their distinctive name of Purumaucas from Quechua purum awqa meaning "savage enemy". The Spanish later corrupted the name into Promaucaes.

The Incas crossed the Maule River, and keeping their old custom, they sent messengers to require these Purumaucas to submit to the rule of the Inca or resort to arms. The Purumaucas had determined to die before losing their freedom, and responded that the victors would be masters of the defeated and that the Incas would quickly see how the Purumaucas obeyed. Three or four days after this answer, the Purumaucas and their allies arrived and camped in front of the Incas' camp with 18,000 - 20,000 warriors. The Incas tried diplomacy, offering peace and friendship, claiming they were not going to take their land and property but to give them a way to live as men. The Purumaucas responded saying that they came not to waste time in vain words and reasoning, but to fight until they won or died. The Incas promised battle the next day.

The following day both armies left their camps and fought all day without either gaining an advantage, and both suffering many wounded and dead. At night they both retired to their positions. On the second and third day they fought with the same results. At the end of the third day of battle both factions saw that they had lost more than half their number in dead, and the living were almost all wounded. On the fourth day, neither side left their own camp, which had been fortified, as they hoped to defend them if their opponents attacked. The fifth and sixth days were passed in the same manner but by the seventh the Purumaucas and their allies retired and returned home claiming victory.

== Revised account by Osvaldo Silva ==
Historian Osvaldo Silva challenges much of the narrative of Garcilaso de la Vega. Silva holds that the battle of the Maule is not connected to the main pulse of Incan conquest of Chile which took place during the reign of Topa Inca Yupanqui (1471–93). Instead he positions it much later when Inca rule was already established in northern Chile, suggesting 1532 as a likely date. Furthermore, Silva argues two battles took place. A first battle would have occurred at Cachapoal River with the Inca army being able to continue south. Then, after deep penetration into Mapuche lands in the south the Inca army returned north while under harassment and at Maule River a weakened Inca army halted to fight incoming Mapuches. The Inca incursion may have reached as far as the site of Concepción where the later account of Jerónimo de Vivar of Mapuches bearing gold and silver objects suggest some kind of Mapuche—Inca interaction.

As such Silva concludes that the Battle of the Maule did not stop the Inca conquest, but it was rather a lack of incentives to commit greater efforts to subdue a non-urban society, plus the difficulties in imposing imperial rule given the political and social structure of the Mapuche. Silva contrasts the Chilean campaigns with the great effort put by the Inca Empire in its arduous war with the Chimú Empire.

== Sources ==
- Inca Garcilaso de la Vega, Comentarios reales, Segunda Parte : Libro VII, Cap. 18, 19, 20.
- Jerónimo de Vivar, Crónica y relación copiosa y verdadera de los reinos de Chile (Chronicle and abundant and true relation of the kingdoms of Chile) ARTEHISTORIA REVISTA DIGITAL; Crónicas de América (on line in Spanish)
- Vicente Carvallo y Goyeneche, Descripcion Histórico Geografía del Reino de Chile (Description Historical Geography of the Kingdom of Chile), PDF E Libros from Memoria Chilena (History of Chile 1542–1788)
  - Tomo I History 1542 - 1626, Tomo 8 de Colección de historiadores de Chile y de documentos relativos a la historia nacional. Santiago : Impr. del Ferrocarril, 1861.
