= Pukara of La Compañía =

Archaeological site in Chile

Coordinates: 34°04′S 70°41′W

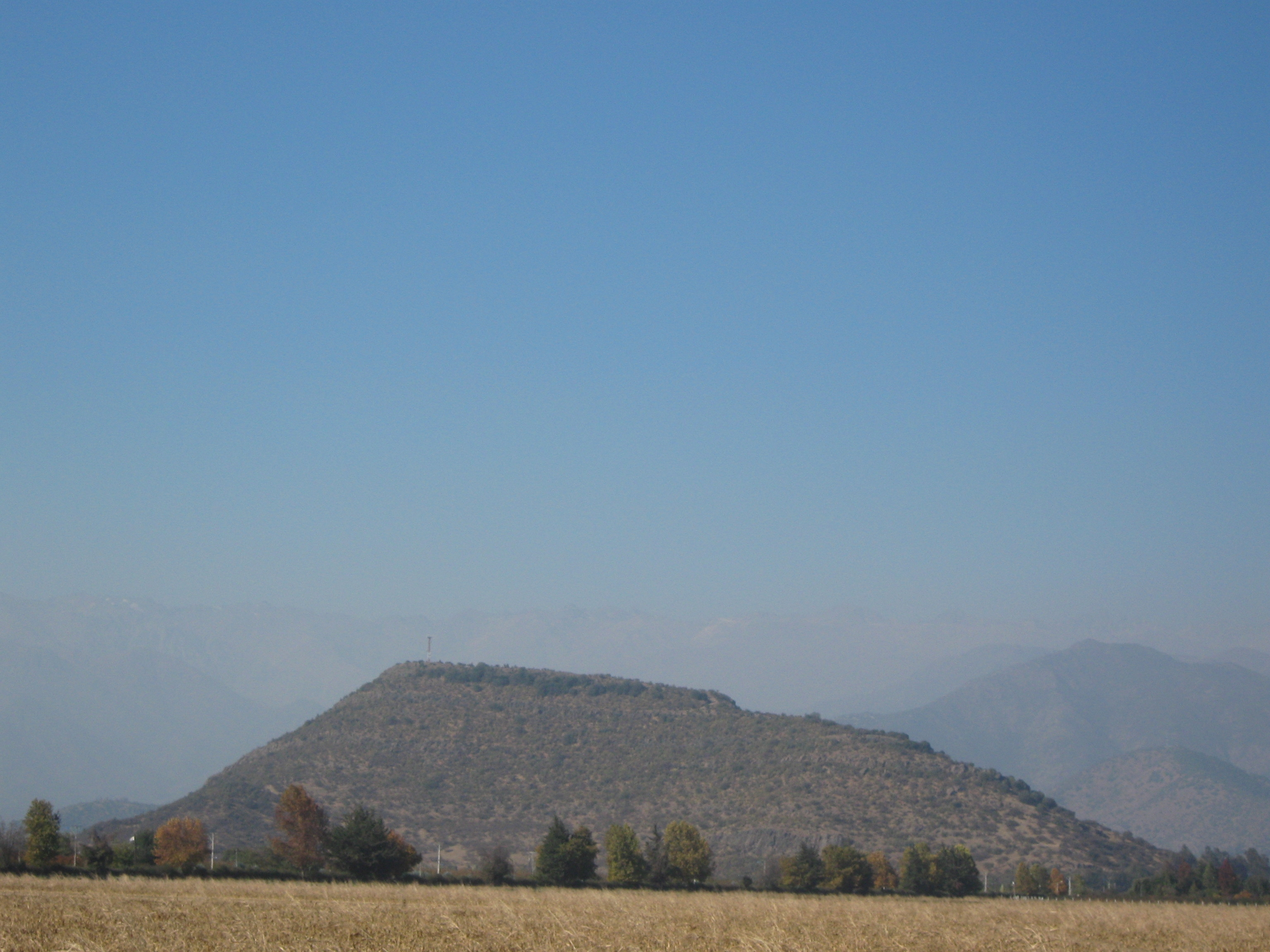

Pukara de La Compañia is an archaeological site containing the remains of a promaucae fortress, later used by the Incas, located on the large hill overlooking the village of La Compañia, a village in the commune of Graneros, Chile. It is the southernmost building which remains of the Inca Empire. As such it is an important landmark on what is known as "The Chilean Inca Trail", and has been declared a National Monument by the Chilean government.

== History ==
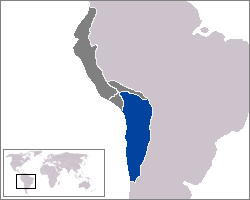
Qullasuyu, Inca suyu where the pukara was located.

There are three main historical periods during which the site was occupied:

- Between the years 1380 and 1450 A.D., the hill was apparently occupied by local promaucaes or picunches during their resistance to the Inca invasion.
- Most of the structures and remains of the hill date to the Inca occupation, namely between the years 1430 and 1450 A.D, approximately.
- Once again the local indigenous population occupied the fortress during their resistance to the Spanish conquest. The evidence of this event is its documentation in Spanish chronicles which later guided archeologists there, allowing them to rediscover the Pukara only a few decades ago.

== Architecture ==
=== Description ===
The remains of the pukara consist of the bases of 7 circular structures, a major construction and other nearby buildings that may have been observation posts. In addition, the flat summit of the hill is surrounded by defensive perimeter walls.

=== Current situation ===
Pukara La Compañia was declared a Chile National Monument by Decree No. 1191, dated 11 March 1992. Nonetheless, the site lacks suitable access for tourists, and is neither maintained nor adequately protected by the authorities. This lack of respect for the archaeological heritage of the pukara is evident in the installation of a large antenna of cellular telephony on the summit of the hill. The installation of this antenna, carried out in 1997, consisted of building an access road and movement of earth, which destroyed 4 metres (13 ft) of one of the defensive walls. As of 2012, O’Higgins Tours had enlisted the skills of graphic designer Eduardo Galdames for an archaeologically based digital reconstruction of the site. The project is ongoing, will be for educational purposes and was partially funded by the Chilean government.

== See also ==
- Cachapoal Valley
- Huaca de Chena
- Incas in Central Chile
- Pucara del Cerro La Muralla
- Pukará de Quitor
- Qullasuyu
- The Chilean Inca Trail
