= Sinchiruca =

Incan military commander

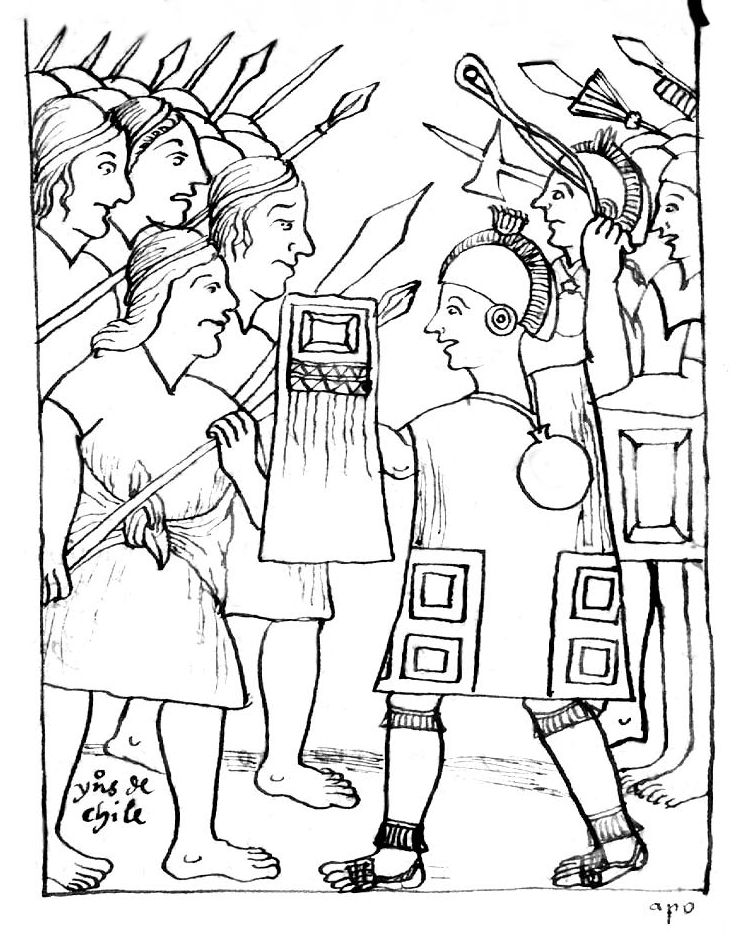
A captain of Inca army Apu Camac fighting against the Mapuche (left) during the battle of the Maule

Sinchiruca was an Incan military commander and a Grand General (Apusquipay) active in late 15th century. A relative of the ruling Inca Tupac Yupanqui, he was named one of the principal commanders of the Inca campaign against the Mapuche that ended with the disastrous Battle of the Maule.

== Life ==
Little is known of Sinchiruca's life outside of a few mentions in colonial literature about the war itself. Even his name is not certain, as it might be related to 12th century ruler Sinchi Roca, after whom Sinchi became a title of local rulers rather than a name in its own right.

According to 1617 Comentarios Reales by Inca Garcilaso de la Vega, Sinchiruca was one of three generals of royal lineage sent to wage war against the southern neighbours of the Inca Empire with an army of 10,000 men at arms.

In a six-year campaign with an army that eventually rose to 50,000 men, the Inca general Sinchiruca had subdued the regions of northern Chile, Copiapó, Coquimbo, Aconcagua and the Maipo Valley around what is now Santiago. After securing the Maipo Valley Sinchiruca sent 20,000 men down to the valley of the Maule River. The territory of the Picunche people inhabiting this last region south of Maipo Valley extended further to the south to the Itata River and these people the south of the Maipo Valley had refused to submit to the rule of the Inca and called on their allies south of the Maule; the Antalli, Pincu, and Cauqui to join in opposing these invaders.

The expedition ended with a three-day Battle of the Maule, in which neither side could gain an upper hand and both suffered heavy casualties, reported as 50% dead and almost 50% wounded. The battle ended the Inca southward expansion.
