= The Chilean Inca Trail =

The Chilean Inca trail (El Camino del Inca en Chile) is a local and popular term among local tourism initiatives and Chilean anthropologists and archaeologists for the various branches of the Qhapak Ñan (the Inca road system) in Chile and its associated Inca archaeological sites.

== History ==
From the mid to late 15th century, the Incas established forts in northern and central Chile, from the far north to near where the city of Rancagua stands today.

Under the helm of the Incas, these parts of Chile were in the Qullasuyu (Quechua for southern region), the south-eastern province of the Inca Empire. Qullasuyu is also the region of the Qulla, named after a subgroup of the Aymara whose kingdom stretched from what is now northern Chile to central Bolivia before their territory was annexed by the Incas. The Qullasuyu extended from Cusco to central Chile, where its advance southwards was halted after the Battle of the Maule when the Incas met determined resistance by Mapuche warriors, and the final border was fixed as being this area.

The Qhapak Ñan, or Inca road network, ran from southern Colombia deep into Chile along the Andes, with an intermittent parallel route along the Pacific coast and various branches and side roads linking the two or extending into Northwestern Argentina and Bolivia. These side roads which linked the main highways followed an east to west orientation in line with the daily route of the sun, which the Incas worshiped as a god. The Spanish later incorporated the local branches of the Qhapak Ñan into the Camino Real a la Frontera, the highway linking Santiago and Concepción.

== Extent ==
The royal Inca road entered Chile from Bolivia through what is now the international border crossing of Tambo Quemado (Quechua tampu inn, Spanish quemado burnt, "burnt inn") on the Bolivian side and Chungara on the Chilean side, while a twin branch that runs parallel to it follows the coast from Peru and passes mostly through lower lying terrain. However, due to the uneven and difficult terrain and its unsuitability for llama caravans heading southwards it is unlikely that this road continued past the Atacama region. Numerous associated sites and branches in the north are found in the regions of Arica & Parinacota, Tarapacá, Antofagasta, Atacama, and Coquimbo.

The altitude of the Inca highway in Chile fluctuates from 4,000 meters above sea-level at the Bolivian border, to 2,000 meters at Copiapo, to 500 meters just north of Santiago, and to the sea level in Valparaíso. It passed through fertile valleys with plenty of lakes and mineral reserves, favourable factors which made it the principal route used by the Incas to the southern extremes of the empire.

Close to Santiago, the main sites of the Chilean Inca Trail include various branches of the Inca highway in the Valparaíso and Metropolitan Regions which have remained largely unchanged since Inca times, and archaeological ruins in the Metropolitan and O'Higgins Regions. According to renowned local archaeologist Ruben Stehberg, who has spent a great many years studying the branches of the Inca highway in Chile, the Inca road that connected the fertile Maipo river valley to the final border at the Cachapoal River passed by the hill of Chada. Between the Metropolitan and O'Higgins regions, the Chilean Inca Trail includes heritage sites such as Huaca de Chena, Chada, and the final frontier of the Incas, Pukara de la Compania, Pucara del Cerro La Muralla, as well as parts of The Camino Real a La Frontera.

== See also ==
- Huaca de Chena
- Inca Empire
- Inca road system
- List of archaeological sites in Chile
- Pukara de la Compañia
- Pucara del Cerro La Muralla
- Qullasuyu
- Tourism in Chile
