= Cuadernos de Historia =

- Discipline: History
- Language: Spanish
- Edited by: Sergio Grez

Publication details
- History: 1980–present
- Publisher: University of Chile (Chile)
- Frequency: Biannual

Standard abbreviations
- ISO 4: Cuad. Hist.

Indexing
- ISSN: 0719-1243

Links
- Journal homepage

Cuadernos de Historia is a peer-reviewed academic journal specialising in the history, archaeology and anthropology. It was established in 1980 by Osvaldo Silva among others. Apart from original articles the journal accepts unpublished documents and book reviews.
