= Pucará de Turi =

National monument of Chile

Coordinates: 22°14′03″S 68°16′37″W

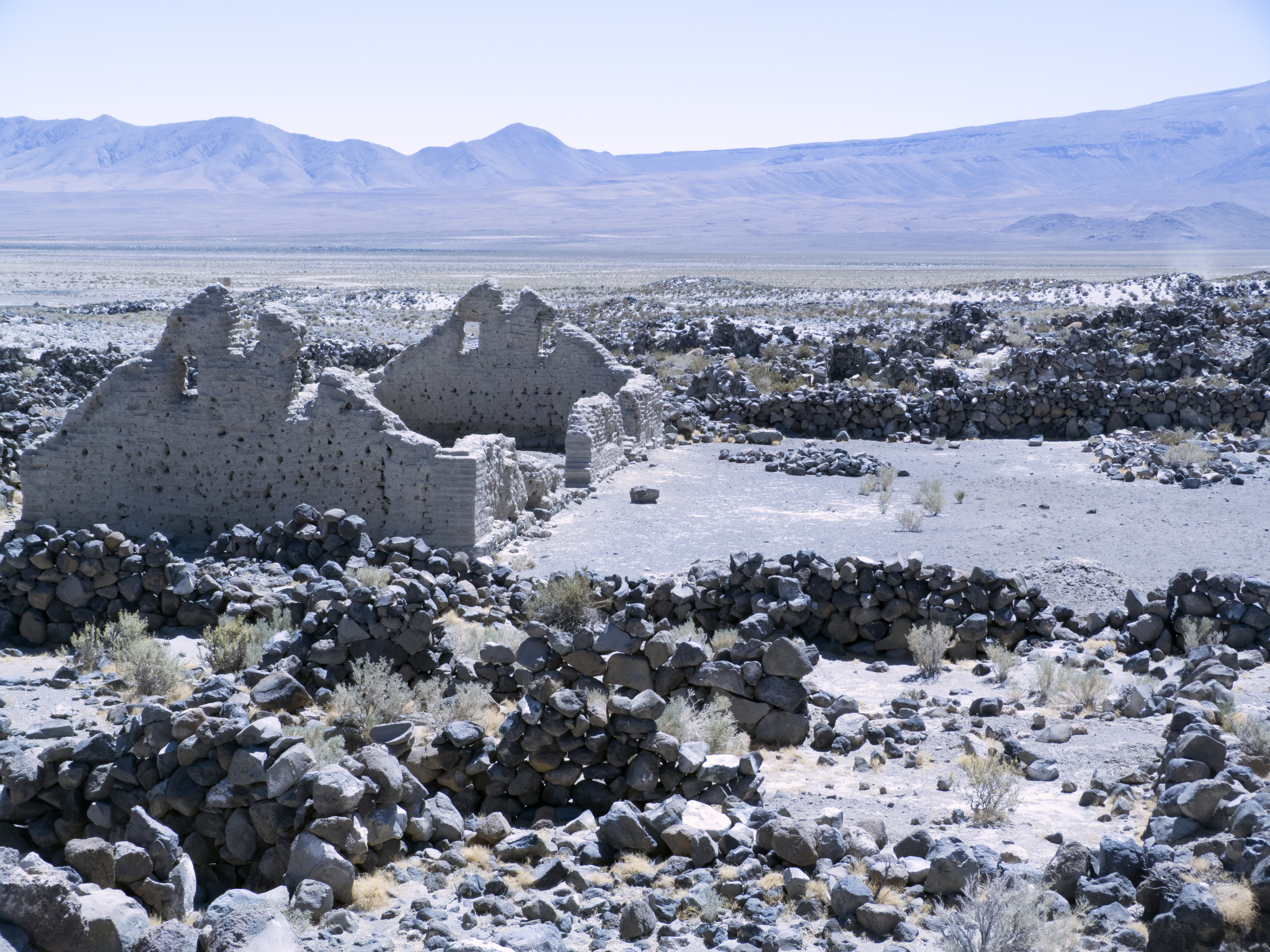
- Interactive map of Pucará de Turi
- Type: Monumento histórico

The Pucará de Turi an archaeological site in the locality of Turi, which is part of Calama, in the Antofagasta Region, Chile. It is located 47 km northeast of the town of San Francisco de Chiu Chiu.

It is listed as a National Monument of Chile since 1983.

== History ==
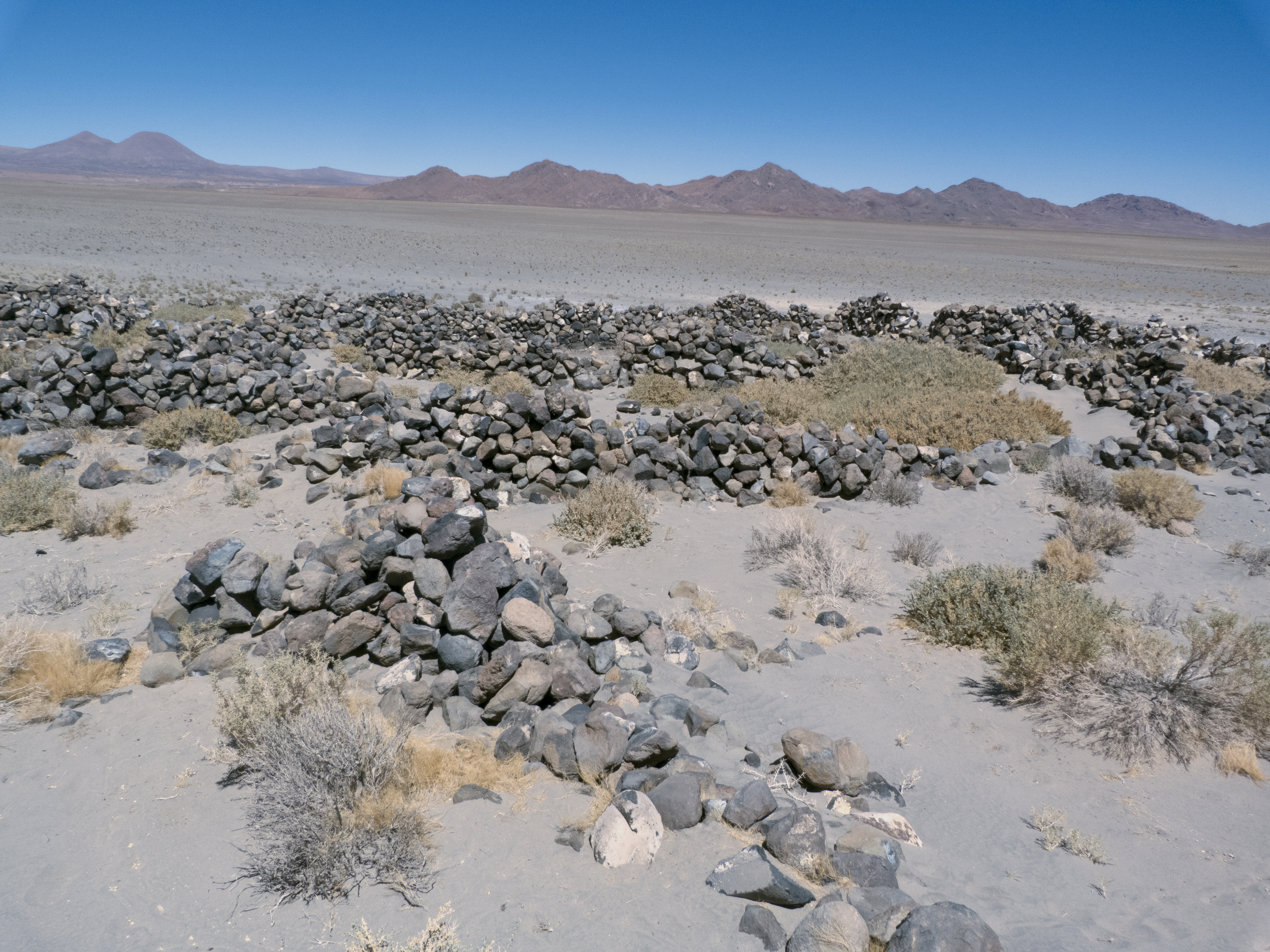
A view of the Pucará de Turi.

This pukara — Quechuan word meaning fortress or fortified hill— is a Pre-Columbian stone construction located in the area of Turi. The fortified hamlet is located at an elevation of 3,100 m above sea level and occupies a surface area of approximately 4 ha. It is the largest architectural complex built by the Atacama people.

The construction dates back to c. 1250; while in the early 15th century, the Inca Topa Inca Yupanqui conquered the territory of the Atacama people, and approximately AD 1470, the citadel-like structure underwent a series of alterations by the addition of Incan structures, including a Kallanka, a 26 metres (85 ft) long building covered with a gable roof. The area included houses with rectangular plan measuring 4 m by 5 m. The complex features about 620 enclosed areas of various sizes and shapes.
