= Tutuvén River =

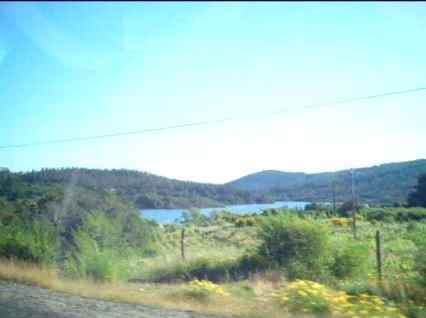
- Tutuvén River in 2014

Location
- Country: Chile

Physical characteristics
- Mouth: Cauquenes River
  - location: Cauquenes, Chile
  - coordinates: 35°58′41″S 72°17′55″W

The Tutuvén River is a river in Chile.

== See also ==
- List of rivers of Chile
