= Promaucae =

Promaucae, also spelled as Promaucas or Purumaucas (from Quechua purum awqa: wild enemy), were an Indigenous pre-Columbian Mapuche tribal group that lived in the present territory of Chile, south of the Maipo River basin of Santiago, Chile and the Itata River. Those to the north were called Quillotanes and Mapochoes by the Spanish colonists). They spoke Mapudungun, like the Moluche to the south, and were part of the Picunche tribe that lived north of the Itata River.

== Description ==
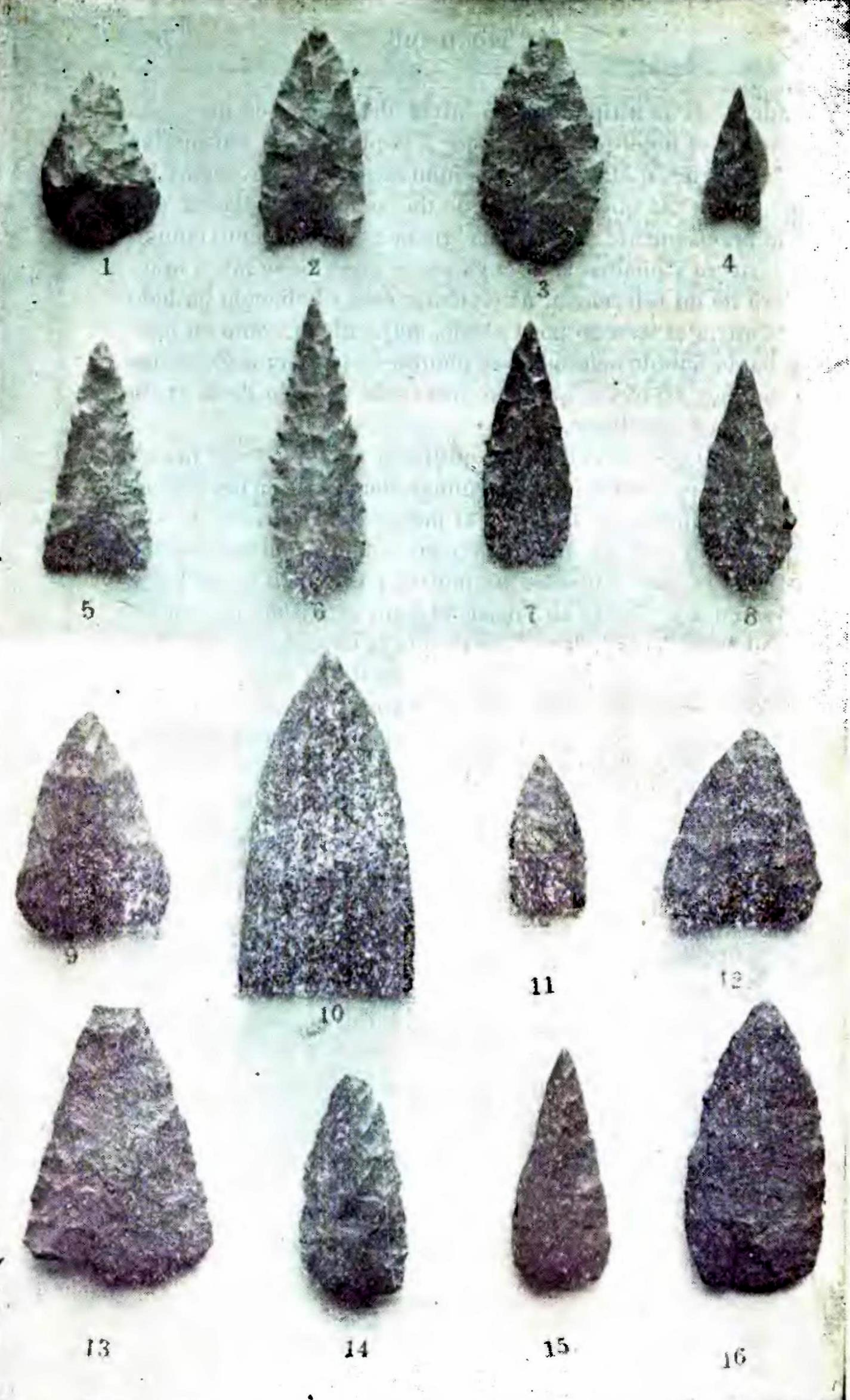
Tools used by Promaucaes, found in Pichilemu in 1908.

The Inca referred to all the peoples who were not under their empire as purum awqa. Because these Picunche tribes were successful in defending their territory against the Inca Empire in the Battle of the Maule, they were given this distinctive name. In an effort to transliterate the word into Spanish phonetics, the Spanish referred to them as the Purumaucas or Promaucaes. The early Spanish in the area knew their region as the province of Promaucae and its inhabitants were called Promaucaes.

The Promaucae are the first inhabitants of the Rancagua Valley of whom there is a historical account. The Mapuche included them in the group that they knew as the picunche, "people of the north". The Promaucae, as has already been mentioned, constituted a distinct cultural unit separate from those Picunche who lived to the north of the Maipo, named mapochoes, and to the south of the Maule, designated maules and cauquenes. The Inca invaders noted the great military capacity and will to fight of the Promucae.

They were farmers and constructed some earthworks for irrigation. They left ceramic vestiges.

=== Inca campaigns ===
The Inca in their expansion used the Pucara del Cerro La Muralla, which they strengthened. The Pucará was the southernmost Inca settlement then known. Inca expeditions in this territory were organized by Túpac Inca Yupanqui at the end of the 15th century and later by Huayna Cápac.

The history of this period is based on what was written in later chronicles. These chronicles indicate that the Promaucaes, informed about the coming of the Incas, allied themselves with the Antalli, Pincu and Cauqui subgroups, forming an army of 20,000 men. The Incas sent emissaries to persuade the locals into accepting Túpac Inca Yupanqui as sovereign, but the Purumaucas decided to face the Inca forces in the so-called Battle of the Maule. During the confrontation, both sides suffered many fatalities and neither army won a clear advantage.

On the fourth day, neither side left their own camp, both of which had been fortified, as they hoped to defend them if their opponents attacked. The fifth and sixth days were passed in the same manner but by the seventh, the Purumauca and their allies retired and returned home claiming victory. The Inca later considered chasing them, on which some chiefs agreed; but they decided to secure only what they had already conquered, with which Túpac Inca Yupanqui agreed.

Due to their proximity to the Inca Empire, the Promaucae learned the new technology that the Inca displayed in their new domains.

Among the peoples the Spanish called the Promaucae, adopting the term from the Inca, were particularly the people of the Rapel River valley. Those of the Mataquito River valley were called the Cure, for which the province of Curico is named. The people in the Maule River valley and to the south were distinguished as Maule. Those to the south of the Maule and north of the Itata River were known as Cauqui by the Inca or Cauquene. The Spanish named the Cauquenes River after them.

== Sources ==
- Inca Garcilaso de la Vega, Comentarios reales, Segunda Parte : Libro VII, Cap. 19, 20.
- Juan Ignacio Molina Compendio de la historia civil del reyno de Chile, Cervantes Virtual
- Larrain, Etnogeografía, Geography of Chile, Geographic Military Institute, Stgo. 1987; the XVIth: 147.
