= Valeriano Fault System =

Group of geological faults in Chile

The Valeriano Fault System (Spanish: Sistema de Fallas Valeriano) is a group of related geological faults located in the high Andes of southern Atacama Region, Chile. The Inca road system follows the fault from north to south.

== See also ==
- Incas in Central Chile
