= Pilauco Bajo =

Archaeological site in Chile

Coordinates: 40°34′12″S 73°06′14″W

Pilauco
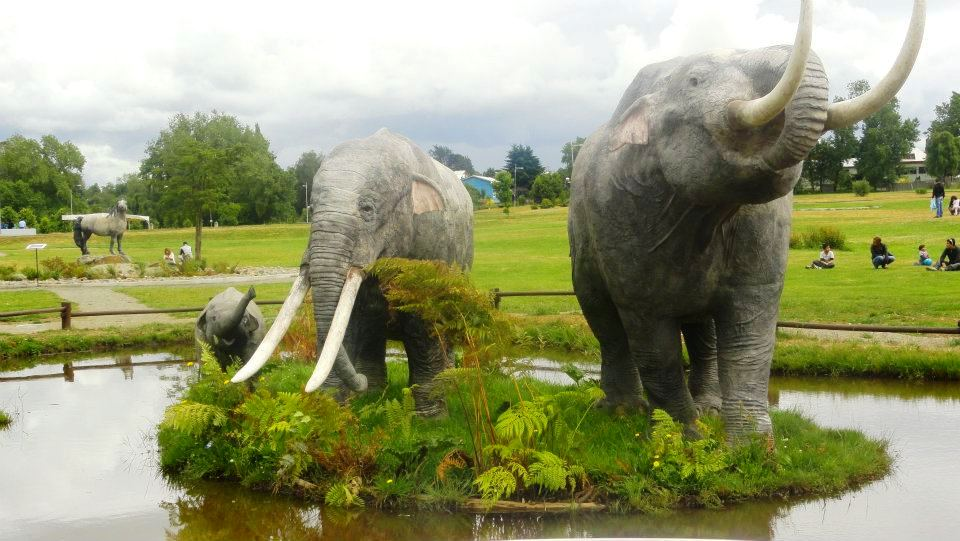
- Gomphothere models in Parque Pleistocénico de Osorno, a park inspired by the findings of Pilauco Bajo.

- Shown within Chile
- Type: open-air
- Associated with: [First American Settlers]
- Location: Southern Chile

Site notes
- Excavation dates: 2007–present
- Archaeologists: Mario Pino Quivira (leader) and others
- Owner: Bienes Nacionales de Chile
- Management: Austral University of Chile and Ilustre Municipalidad de Osorno
- Public access: Partial

Pilauco is a paleontological and archaeological site located in the city of Osorno in Southern Chile. The site contains both human made lithic artifacts and megafauna remains–including gomphotheres. All the horizons containing megafauna and evidence of human activity date to the late Pleistocene. The calibrated radiocarbon dates indicate there was human activity in the site between 16,400 and -12,800 cal years B.P.

Most of the stone artifacts found in Pilauco are made of volcanic rock such as dacite, rhyodacite and rhyolite from the Puyehue-Cordón Caulle Volcanic Complex immediately east in the Andes. Yet these rocks were imported by humans to the site as nearby rivers have not transported them.

== Paleontology ==
In a 2007-2008 paleontological investigation 648 complete and fractured bones, 37 teeth, 11 coprolites, 348 wood pieces, 126 seeds, 28 skin and hair fragments were found. Further, 71 sediment samples were collected for analysis.

== See also ==
- List of archaeological sites in Chile
- Monte Verde
- Settlement of the Americas
