= Pucara del Cerro La Muralla =

Inca Pucara (fortress) in Chile

Coordinates: 34°28′29.51″S 71°8′22.43″W

Pucará de Cerro La Muralla (Pucara of Wall's Hill) is an Inca Pucara (fortress) in Chile. It is located on a strategic mountain top, five km to the south of San Vicente de Tagua Tagua, near the dry lagoon (Laguna de Tagua Tagua). This is believed to be the southernmost fort of the Inca Empire.

== History ==
The Inca invasion, having advanced beyond the Choapa river, came to Picunche territory. They established in the zone several storage facilities and the fortress of Cerro La Muralla.

Located on the strategic top of the hill, the fortress is near the lagoon that is now dry.

It is located between the Cachapoal River and Tinguiririca River.

It is presumed that the fort was used as point of observation, since from here, the north valley can be controlled. The lagoon was also useful for defence.

== Structure ==
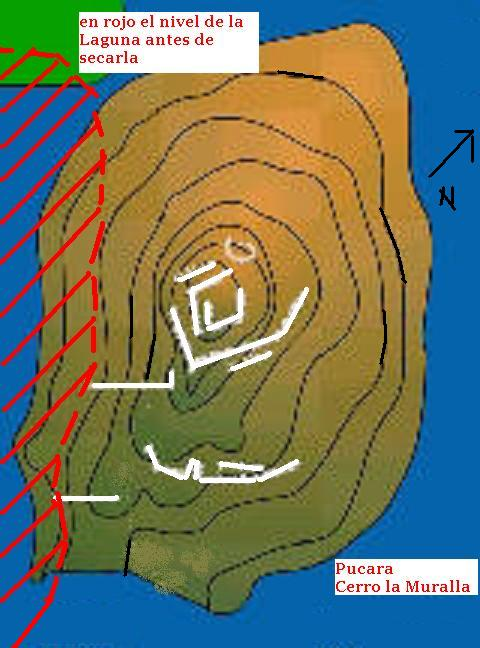
Structure of walls of the Pucará and relation to the hill and the level of the lagoon before it dried up.

In the top of the Hill, the walls tracing an eagle in flight like another Inca structures. It has three defensive walls and two sectors with housings. Abundant ceramics and stone cups have been found. To 100 m of the first wall they realized works of recognition in the strength, that alone them esplanade, that apparently served as field of cultures. Evidence is that this construction was effected by the Incas, due to the work of the stone in blocks, the dimension of the enclosures and the structural terrace shapes of some sectors. Integral forms a part with Laguna de Tagua Tagua, since it does not have south wall, which was covered by the lagoon.

== Investigations ==
Claudio Gay described his ascent to Cerro La Muralla, which then was called an Inca fortress. In 1974, scientists of the Chilean National Museum of Natural History, decided that this Indian fortress was constructed before the arrival of the Spanish to this place.

== Current importance ==
Nearby is an image of the Virgin of Fátima, since habitual age in the Spanish Conquest. Any suspicious site of adoration to other deities was covered with icons of Catholic adoration. In this sector every year on the second Sunday of September celebrates a mass, to which he represents a parishioners' great quantity. This hurts the archaeological site., February 2009

== Projects ==
At San Vicente of Tagua Tagua there is a project to have a museum and to recover the pieces extracted from the zone and that were extracted from the place by investigators. In addition one tries to create museums in situ, and to medium term, a controlled route to the pucará of The Wall.

== Bibliography ==
- Rubén Stehberg, Fortaleza La Muralla, San Vicente de Tagua Tagua.

== See also ==
- The Chilean Inca Trail
- Huaca de Chena
- Pukara de La Compañia
