= Pukara =

Type of prehistoric fort in the Andes

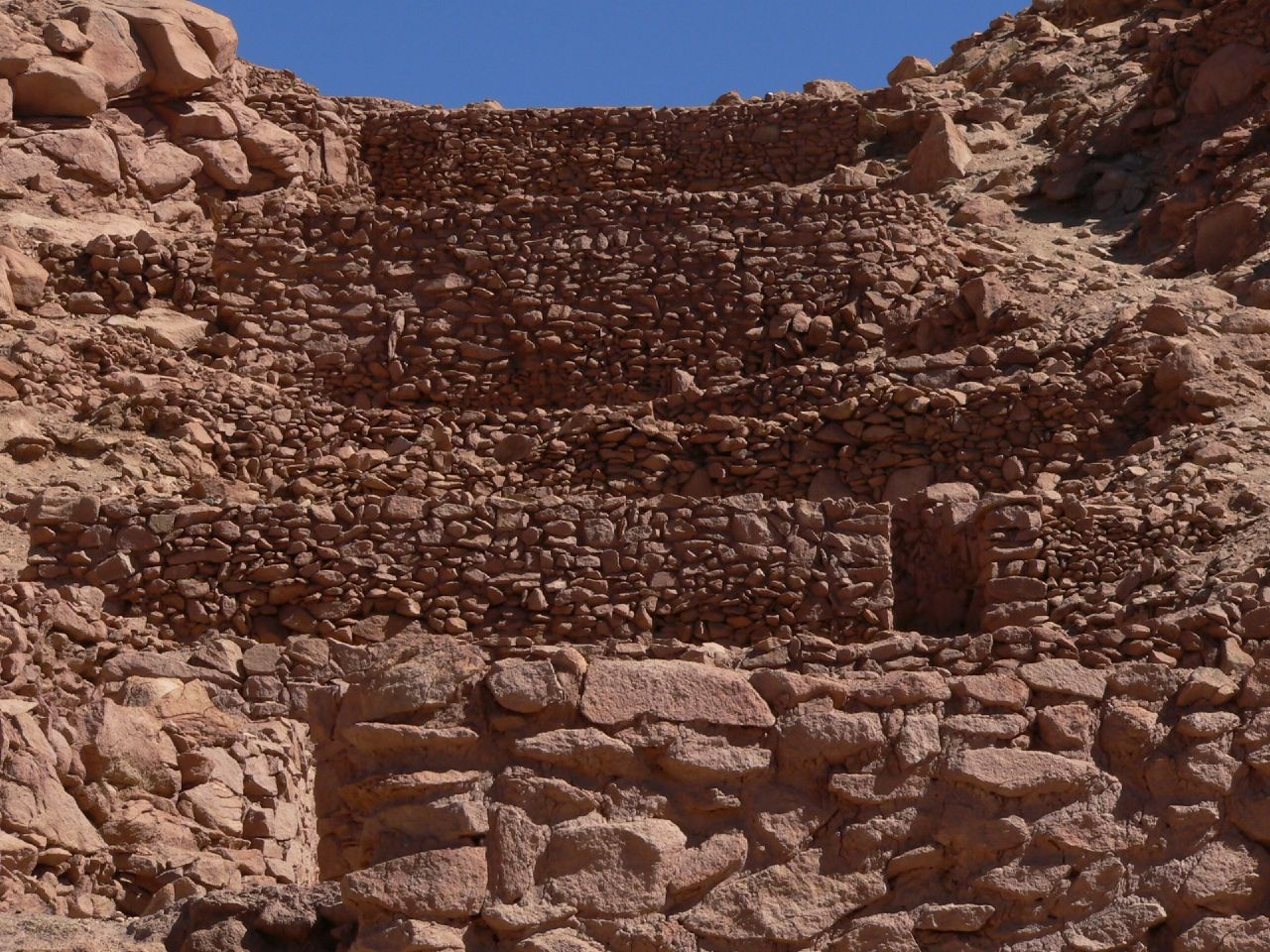
Part of the complex Pukará de Quitor as seen from the inside

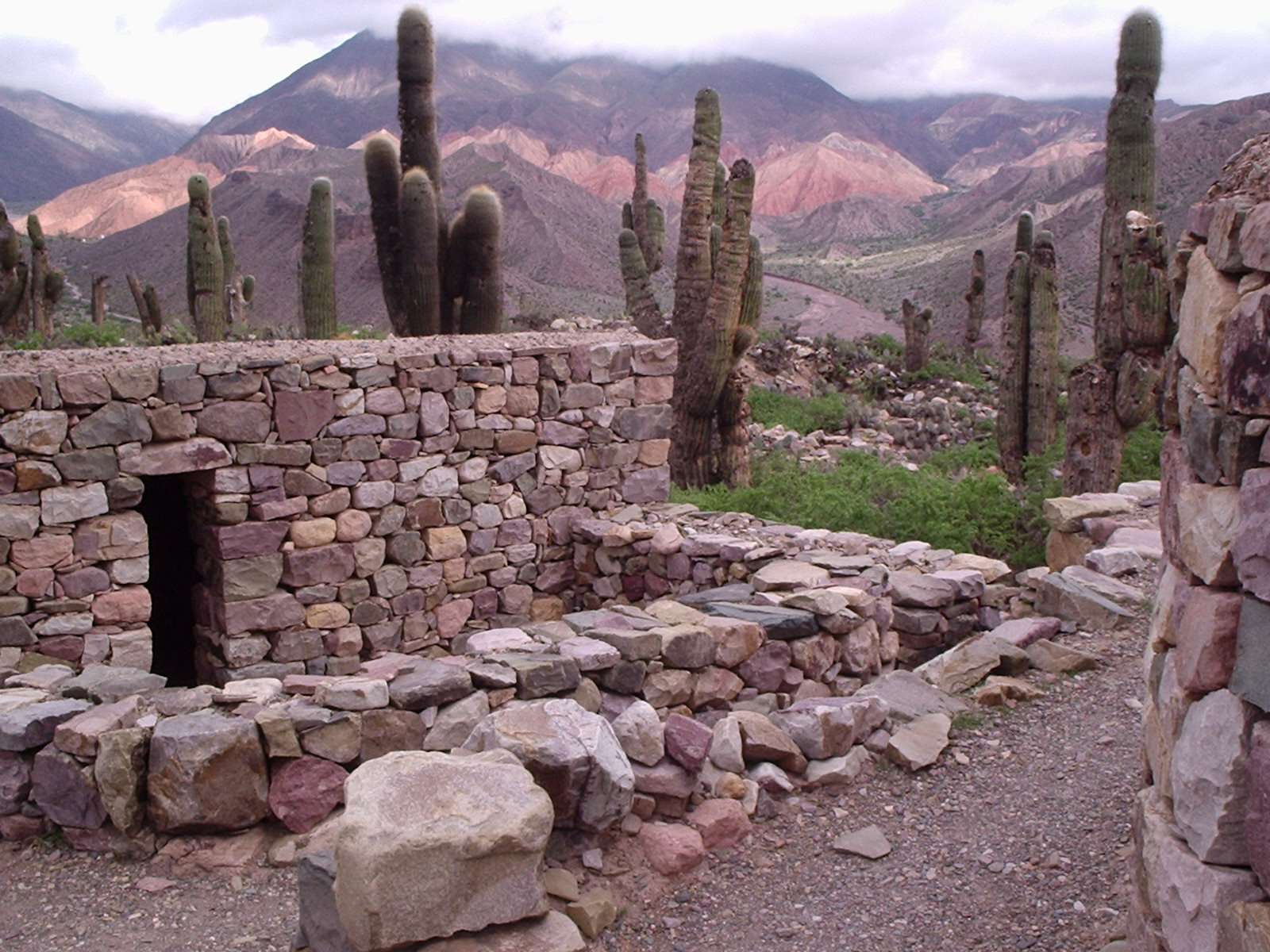
Ruins of the Pucará de Tilcara, Argentina

Pukara (Aymara and Quechua "fortress", Hispanicized spellings pucara, pucará) is a defensive hilltop site or fortification built by the prehispanic and historic inhabitants of the central Andean area (from Ecuador to central Chile and northwestern Argentina). In some cases, these sites acted as temporary fortified refuges during periods of increased conflict, while other sites show evidence for permanent occupation. Emerging as a major site type during the Late Intermediate Period (c. 1000-1430AD), the pukara form was adopted in some areas by the Inca military in contested borderlands of the Inca Empire. The Spanish also referred to the Mapuche earthen forts built during the Arauco War in the 16th and 17th centuries by this term.

Today, the term is commonly found in toponyms of the Andes region, e.g. Andalicán, Pucará de Angol, Camiña, Cañete, Nama, Quiapo, Tilcara, Turi, Pucara del Cerro La Muralla, Pukara of La Compañía, Pukara de Lasana, Pucará de Belén, Pukará de Quitor and Puka Pukara.

The Argentine Pucará ground attack aircraft is named after the fortresses.

== Number and location of Inca pukaras ==
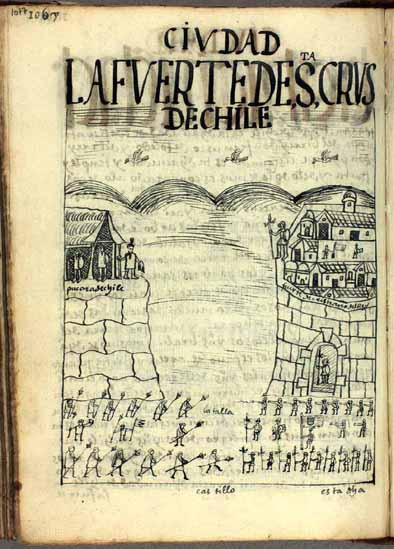
"The native pukara and the Christian fortress of Santa Cruz de Chile, the scene of battles between Spanish Christians and the native infidels of Chile", painting of 1615 by the Inca painter Guamán Poma. Royal Library, Denmark.

Inca pukaras were mostly located near the frontiers of the Inca Empire. The greatest concentration is in northern Ecuador, indicating that the Incas encountered the sternest resistance to their expansion there, an assumption confirmed by the early Spanish chroniclers of Inca history. North of Quito, the Incas met stiff opposition from several chiefdoms, collectively called the Pais Caranqui. The Pambamarca Fortress Complex was a group of pukaras built by the Incas to prosecute the war against the Cayambe people. Other pukaras grouped around the town of Caranqui facilitated the final defeat of the chiefdoms and their incorporation into the Inca Empire. These wars probably took place between 1490 and 1520. Peru has hundreds of towns, ruins, and locations with the name of Pucara; however, it is not known how many of these sites were actually built or maintained during the Inca Empire or if were actual fortresses in first place, as it has been customary since the colony to designate as pucara whichever place seemingly appearing to have been a fortress, despite the fact that it may have never been used as such.

The table following is a rough count of the number and location of Inca pukaras which are known to archaeologists.

Country	No. of Inca Pukaras
Northern Ecuador	106
Southern Ecuador	27
Cuzco Region, Peru	5
Peru	unknown
Southeastern Bolivia	14
Northwest Argentina	15
North and Central Chile	17
Total	184
