= Cauquenes River =

River in Chile

Coordinates: 35.99551°S 72.23099°W

Cauquenes River

The Cauquenes River is a tributary of the Perquilauquén River, and traverses Cauquenes Province, in the Maule Region of Chile. It is born in the Cordillera de la Costa, near Cauquenes. After passing to the south of the latter city it is joined by the Tutuvén River. In its lower course it receives only a few minor streams before flowing into the Perquilauquén, a tributary of the Maule River.

Like the Purapel, the Cauquenes River is one of the few rivers that flow eastward, in a country where the overwhelming majority of rivers flow east-to-west.
