= Picunche =

Indigenous people of Chile

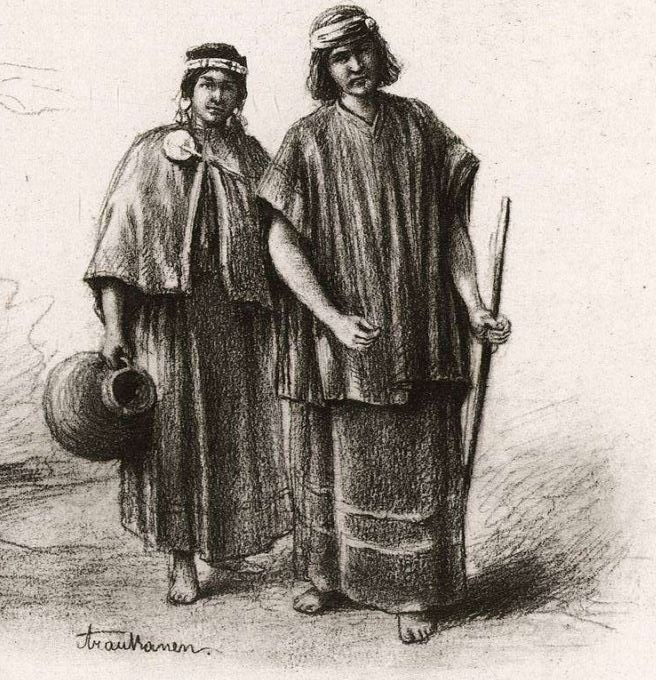
- Illustration of a Picunche couple in Durch Süd-Amerika (1894) by Theodor Ohlsen

Regions with significant populations
- Chile (from the Aconcagua River to the Biobío River, in Central Chile)

Languages
- Mapudungun, Spanish

Religion
- Mapuche religion, Inca religion, Catholicism

Related ethnic groups
- Mapuche, Diaguita, Chiquillanes, Pehuenche

The Picunche (a Mapudungun word meaning "North People"), also referred to as picones by the Spanish, were a Mapudungun-speaking people living to the north of the Mapuches or Araucanians (a name given to those Mapuche living between the Itata and Toltén rivers) and south of the Choapa River and the Diaguitas. Until the Conquest of Chile the Itata was the natural limit between the Mapuche, located to the south, and Picunche, to the north. During the Inca attempt to conquer Chile the southern Picunche peoples that successfully resisted them were later known as the Promaucaes.

== Subgroups ==
The Picunche living north of the Promaucaes were called Quillotanes (those living in the Aconcagua River valley north to the Choapa) and Mapochoes (those living in the Maipo River basin) by the Spanish, and were part of the Inca Empire at the time when the first Spaniards arrived in Chile.

Among the peoples the Spanish called the Promaucaes, the people of the Rapel River valley were particularly called by this name by the Spanish. Those of the Mataquito River valley were called the Cures. The people in the Maule River valley and to the south were distinguished as Maules and those to the south of the Maules and north of the Itata were known as Cauqui by the Inca and Cauquenes by the Spanish and that gave their name to Cauquenes River.

== Decline ==
They did not survive as a separate society into the present day, because of a general population decline and having been absorbed into the general Chilean population during the colonial period.

The Indigenous Picunche disappeared by a process of mestizaje by gradually abandoning their villages (pueblo de indios) to settle in nearby Spanish haciendas. There Picunches mingled with disparate Indigenous peoples brought in from Araucanía (Mapuche), Chiloé (Huilliche, Cunco, Chono, Poyas) and Cuyo (Huarpe). Few in numbers, disconnected from their ancestral lands and diluted by mestizaje the Picunche and their descendants lost their Indigenous identity.

Distribution of pre-Hispanic people of Chile

== Agriculture ==
The Picunches' primary crops consisted of corn and potatoes, and they lived in thatched-roof adobe houses.
