= Osvaldo Silva =

Chilean historian (1940–2019)

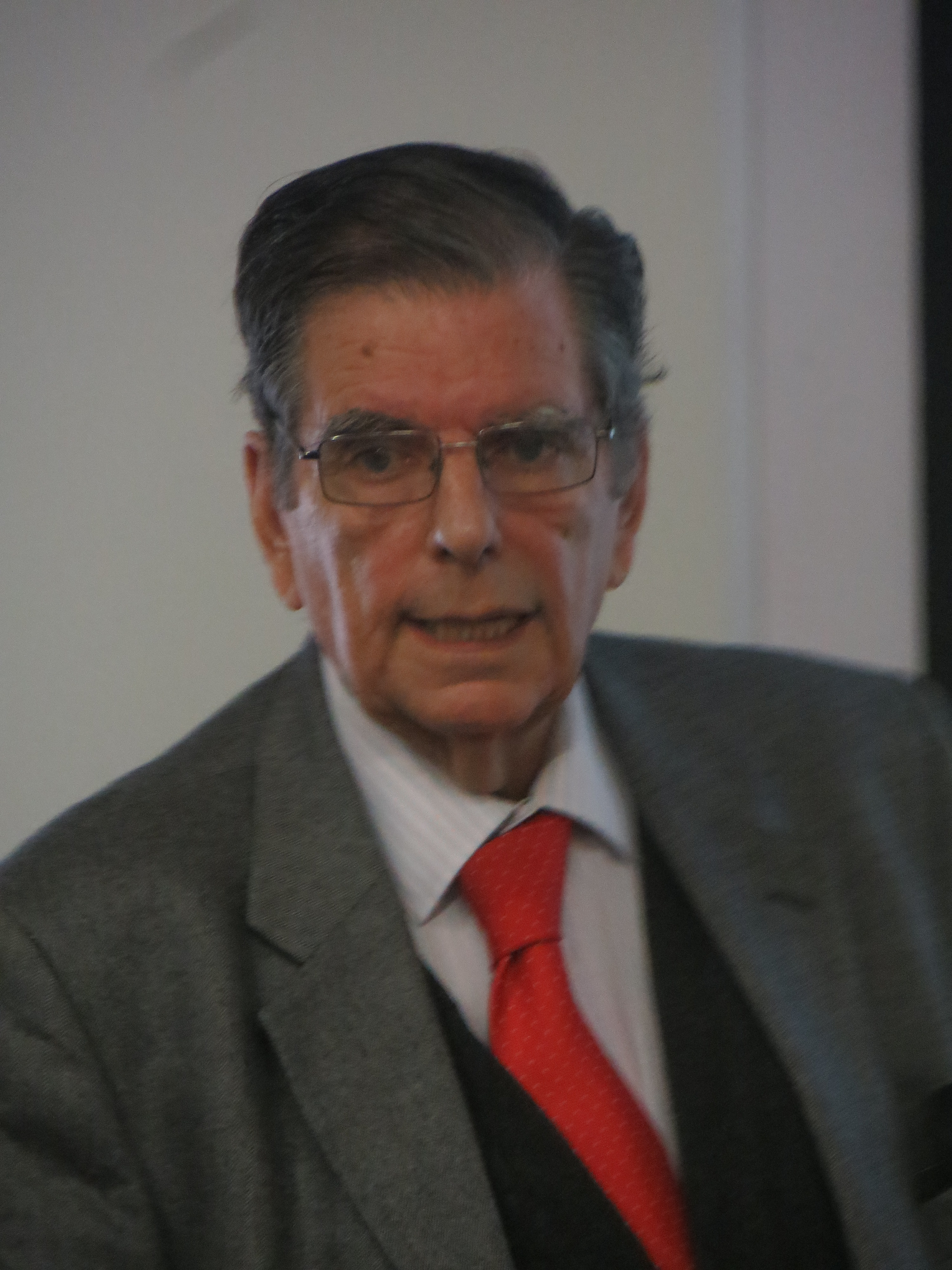
- Osvaldo Silva lecturing in the 2010s
- Born: 24 May 1940; Santiago, Chile
- Died: 2019
- Education: University of Chile (B.A. in History, 1963); Temple University (M.A. in Anthropology, 1971)
- Scientific career
- Fields: History of Chile, Prehistory

Osvaldo Silva Galdames (24 May, 1940–2019) was a Chilean historian active within the field of prehistory. He was a founder of the academic history journals Cuadernos de Historia and Revista de Historia Indígena, as well being a driving force behind the establishment of the Magíster de Historia con mención en etnohistoria at the University of Chile. At the same university he served as director of the department for Historical Science for many years. Among Silva's contributions to history was a proposal for a different chronology of the Inca rule in Chile.

He was born on 24 May 1940, in Santiago, being the son of Osvaldo Silva Rivera and Berta Galdames Ramírez. He was married with Paulina Dittborn Cordua.
