= Purapel River =

River in Chile

Coordinates: 35.68003°S 72.03203°W

drainage area of Purapel river

The Purapel river is a tributary of the river Perquilauquén, and traverses parts of the Talca and Linares provinces, in the Maule Region of Chile. It is born in the Cordillera de la Costa, near Empedrado, forms part of the border between these two provinces and, in its lower course, forms part of the border between the provinces of Linares and Cauquenes.

The Purapel is an anomaly since it flows eastward in a country where the overwhelming majority of rivers flow east-to-west.
