= Huaca de Chena =

Former Inca fortress in Maipo Province, Chile

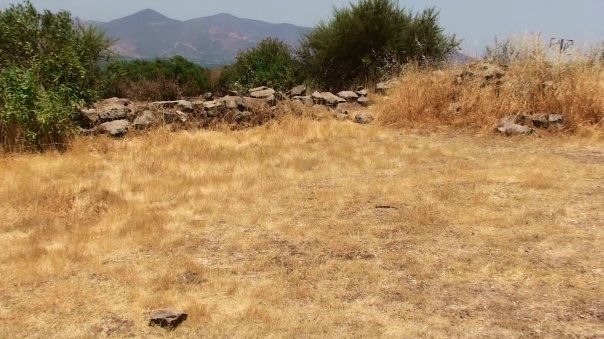
Chena Pukara

Huaca de Chena, also known as the Chena Pukara, is an Inca site on Chena Mountain, in the basin of San Bernardo, at the edge of the Calera de Tango and Maipo Province communes in Chile. Tala Canta Ilabe was the last Inca who celebrated Inti Raymi in its Ushnu.

== Etymology ==
The word Chena means puma in estrous cycle in the Quechuan language.

== History ==
The site was constructed by the Incas of the Qullasuyu. The Chena Mountain fortress or pucará is located at Cucará Point, at the opening for Catemito Road. In 1976, archeologist Rubén Stehberg published the report "Chena's Fortress and its relation with the Inca occupation of central Chile". The topographic survey was realized by engineer Hans Niemeyer.

=== Southern sanctuary ===
In the present day, despite the controversy concerning its occupation by the Incas in pre-Columbian times, the Pucará de Chena is recognized as the southernmost Inca sanctuary.

== Architecture ==
This fortress possesses a set of nine enclosures situated at the hill's summit and two surrounding walls, which were initially interpreted as defensive structures. The first attempt at a new interpretation of their function was published in 1991. It points out that the perimeter of the walls of the pucará suggests the form of an animal, possibly a feline, and concludes that these were not defensive walls, rather a representation of the three areas of the Inca cosmovision.

== The form of a feline, the same as Cuzco ==
This form, similar to that of an animal (unique in Chile), is akin to the figure of a puma which was also represented in the layout of the cardinal city of Inca Empire, Cusco.

Sarmiento de Gamboa indicated that the city's builder had conceived it in the form of a puma. Fernando and Edgardo Elorrieta describe a great quantity of Inca buildings located in the sacred valley as resembling animal forms, some of them related to the constellations that were seen in the night sky. They also describe the associations of these buildings with astronomy.

The hind end of this feline presents apertures for doors, corridors and separations between walls, which allow for the passage of the first ray of sun on the solstice and the equinox. The first ray of sun on the winter solstice (June 21) moves through four doors in one direction. During the dawn on the summer solstice (December 21), months later, the last ray of sun follows the path in the opposite direction.

== The Huaca de Chena ==
A huaca (Quechuan Wak'a) is a sacred place, a space of ritual use. The previous descriptions seem to indicate that Chena's Pucará was, and is, a huaca.

" This Andean sacralization of geography has long-standing precedents in the Andes, and should not be thought of as solely Incan, even if Tawantinsuyu adapted it to fit its political interests. In addition, one must not believe that this geographical perception can only be applied to the nuclear Andean region. On the contrary, where ever Tawantinsuyu's state civil servants, or its influence, went, there too spread this particular way of perceiving and organizing the physical world. "

— Archeologist Ruben Stehberg

=== Reasons why it is a huaca and not a pucará ===
The reasons that support this place as a ceremonial and not a military compound:

- Weapons were not found during the excavations; water is located 2,5 km away; housing accommodates 6 people, insufficient for the garrison that is supposed to have defended the extensive perimeter walls;
- The pucará has a zoomorphic shape (it looks like a "puma""), and this is characteristic of Inca ceremonial centers;
- When observed, the pucará consists of three separate spaces (the first perimeter wall, the second perimeter wall and the central enclosures), which can be interpreted as the typical "Inca Tripartición of Pachacuti Yamqui" (A lower zone, a terrestrial zone and a celestial zone);
- Finally, in the primary enclosure it is possible to observe the existence of one Ushnu (place of observation). Curiously, it is possible to trace a perfectly straight line between Chena's ushnu and the place where the Sun sets on every winter solstice (on La Costa Mountain chain).

== The Huaca de Chena Astronomical Observatory ==
The Incas had developed an astronomy based on the rising and setting of Inti (the Sun), Quilla (the Moon) and certain planets and stars, in particular, Chasca (Venus) and Collca (the Pleiades). In 1996, a new article published in an engineering magazine offered a new interpretation, according to which the pucara might be a ritual site and an astronomical observatory, not a fortress. The abundant quantity of specialized literature indicates that the Inca astronomers realized highly precise observations and were constructing observatories throughout the territory that they occupied. These observatories were necessary for the elaboration of calendars with agricultural, religious, civil purposes, etc. Boccas, explores this line of analysis in depth.

== Calendar ==
Because of the long distances that typically existed between villages and the need to cross them on foot, it is presumed that each settlement of relative importance relied on an observatory that allowed the inhabitants to manage their own calendar. The Inca settlement that the Spanish found when they arrived in the Valley of Santiago was surely not the exception. The date on which the Sun passes through the nadir (antizenith) was also known, and it formed a temporary axis with the passage through the zenith. Aveni discovered two important buildings in the Inca city Wanuku Pampa whose orientation is glaringly different from the rest of the city: they align with the axis (zenith - antizenith), which later becomes known as the "standard time of Cuzco", suggesting that the Incas, not having been able to apply the same seasonal criteria throughout their entire empire (south of the tropics, the Sun never passes through the zenith, as is the case with Chena), had to maintain a coherence among the calendars between remote places of their empire and the capital. In Chena, we have not seen this type of alignment with "Cuzco's time zone".

=== Skills of observation ===
June 23 is the holiday of Inti Raymi, the Inca New Year. Incas standing at the beginning of the shortest red line would observe the first ray of Sun that passed a slot between two walls. The Sun would rise behind the Ushnu, or altar. In order to recontextualize this holiday, the date was overlapped with the feast of San Juan Bautista (24 June), and with San Pedro and San Pablo (29th and 30 June) in other towns.

=== Winter solstice ===
The sunrise of the winter solstice occurs in a "key" point from Chena's ushnu: the closest intersection of the horizon (Chena's cord) and the furthest intersection (La Costa mountain chain). In addition, found in this exact direction is the summit of the highest hill (1.166 msnm) that peaks to the south of the Cuesta Zapata. This detail might not be a coincidence, but rather an important topographic requirement, due to the known association of high hills with the worship of water in various cultures.

=== Determination of geographical North - South Axis ===
In order to determine the astronomical or geographical north, it is sufficient to observe the rising point and the setting point of the star Vega (Lira's Alpha), Urcu Chillay or macho llama to the Incas, around the time of the winter solstice. Next, look for the mid-point, this represents the north. This simple method probably allowed early astronomers to determine the North - South axis. The diagram that followed was a product of over a decade of in situ observation of astronomical events and depicts the system of astronomical observation with the naked eye. It was most likely used by Inca astronomers to design the huaca and then to realize their observations of the apparent movement of the stars.

== First Ceque Found in Santiago ==
During the celebration of the Inti Raymi of 2006 at the Huaca de Chena, the young archeologist and mountaineer Ricardo Moyano observed the sun rise and recognized the depression in the hills where the Sun rises, similarly to the Portezuelo del Inca site. Up to this moment, this name never had had an explanation. Based on this observation, in Stehberg's opinion, it might be the first line of ceque found in Santiago. In Cuzco, the ceques consisted of imaginary lines that began at the Coricancha and moved outwards toward each huaca, forming a total of 328 huacas. They fulfilled the function of political, social and religious order. The Coricancha was the primary temple of the Inca culture. At dawn on the equinox, the Sun moves through the door of the eastern enclosure and then crosses the corridor. At sunset, it reverses course. The corridor of access' diagonal marks the North - South line. By means of this simple method, and using mud and stones as construction materials, the Inca astronomers achieved observations of great precision.

== Pre-Hispanic Cemetery ==
33°36′39.94″S 70°45′15.81″W

Two cemeteries were also found at the foot of the hill, presumably diaguita-Inca, separated from each other by approximately 600 metres (2,000 ft). The diaguitas reveal a special preoccupation with their burials, which demonstrated their concern for a life after death in which the llama has a primordial role. Dual ceramics point to the belief of the existence of two worlds in which shamans are the nexus. The arrival of the Incas brought with it the tradition of making altars and sanctuaries in the valley's highest hills.

== Neglect and rediscovery ==
=== Abandonment ===
Unfortunately, this important site has been neglected. Its administration lies in the hands of the Municipalities of Calera de Tango and San Bernardo, which do not have the necessary resources for adequate maintenance and administration. A barbed-wired fence seems to have been relocated illegally, and now encroaches on the Huaca's land. A lack of detailed maps of the site by the San Bernardo and Calera de Tango municipalities has delayed the investigations. There are currently farmed fields in the area where the cemeteries located to the west were found. At the summit, the reconstruction carried out in the 1960s has been practically destroyed, leaving only the base of some walls and part of them have completely disappeared. Hikers have unwittingly removed stones from the walls in order to build their campfires. The signs installed years ago still mention military use as the only function of the pucará. No mention exists of the findings made as a result of the new research. A serious effort is urgently needed to save and revitalize this important piece of the pre-Hispanic past.

=== Present-day religious use ===
In contrast with this physical abandon, in the last decade, diverse groups and people have been re-discovering the Huaca. The Quechuan Aymará community from Santiago stands out, as they negotiate with authorities in order to recover the Huaca de Chena as a ritual space for the current and future generations of descendants from the original Andean peoples. The communities consider it very important that descendants from the Andean villages recover this sacred place (nowadays left in utter abandon), and therefore possess a ritual space of their own inside the city. This would allow them to establish a physical and spiritual link with their cultural inheritance.

== See also ==
- The Chilean Inca Trail
