= Pukará de Quitor =

Archaeological site in Chile

Coordinates: 22°53′27″S 68°12′52″W

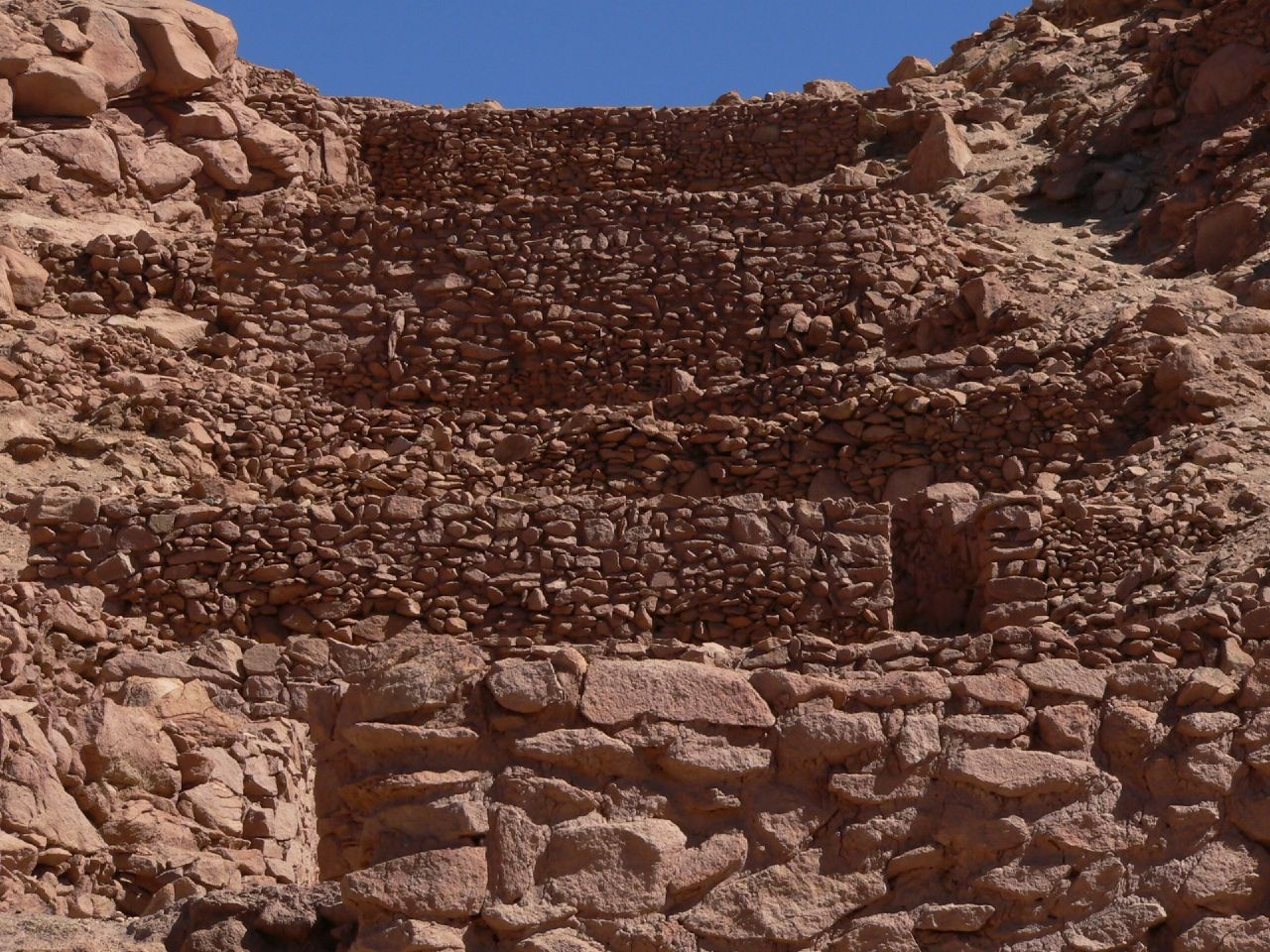
Part of the complex as seen from the inside.

Pukará de Quitor (also spelled Pucará de Quitor) (Quechua pukara fortress) is a pre-Columbian archaeological site in northern Chile. This stone fortress is located 3 km (1.9 mi) northwest of the town of San Pedro de Atacama, overlooking the valley of the river San Pedro. It was designated a national monument in 1982.
