= Maule River =

Coordinates: 35°19′00″S 72°24′30″W

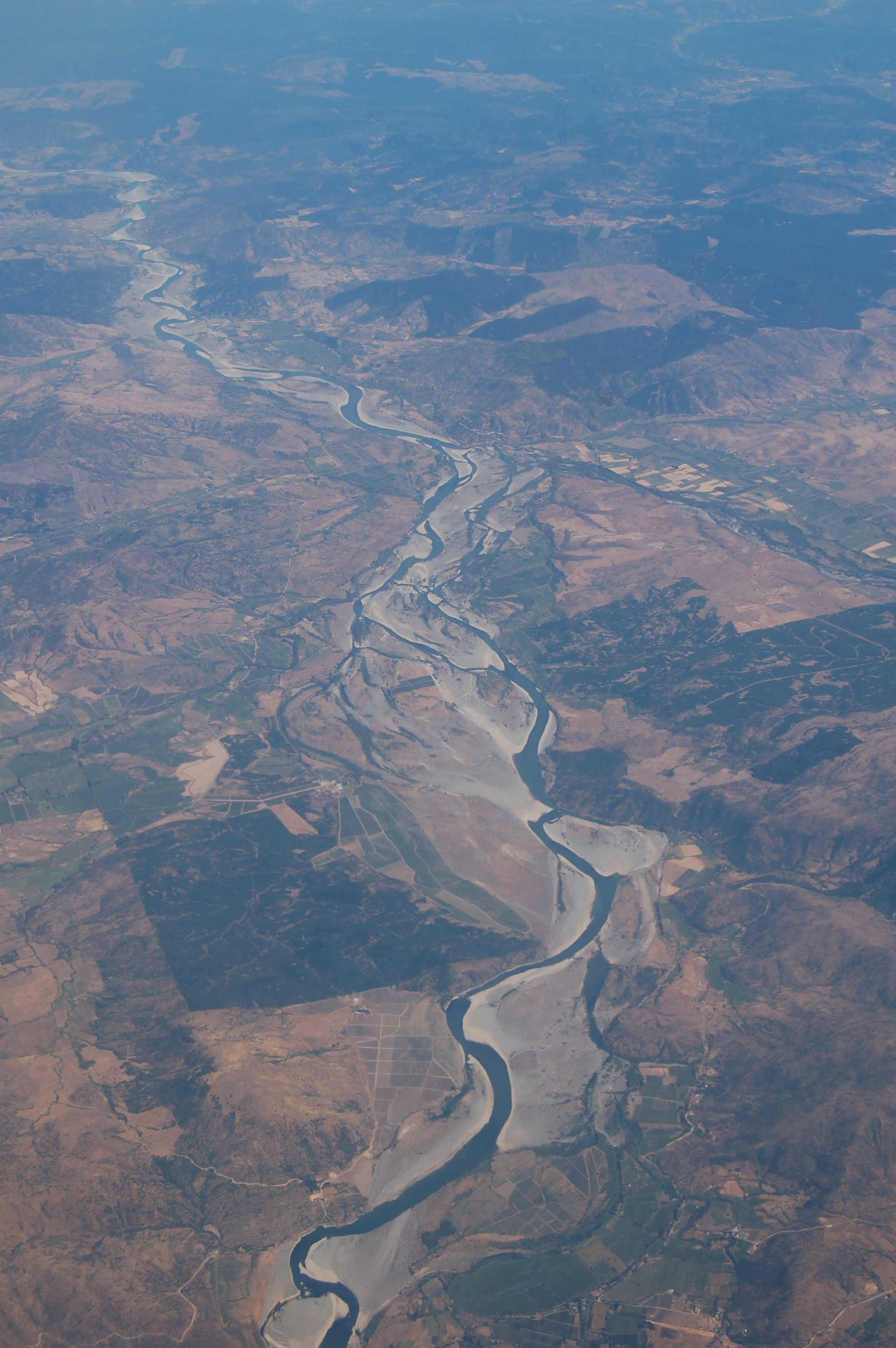
- Aerial view of the Maule River

Location
- Country: Chile

Physical characteristics
- Source
  - location: Laguna del Maule
  - elevation: 2,200 m (7,200 ft)
- Mouth
  - location: Pacific Ocean
- Length: 240 km (150 mi)
- Basin size: 20,600 km^{2} (8,000 sq mi)

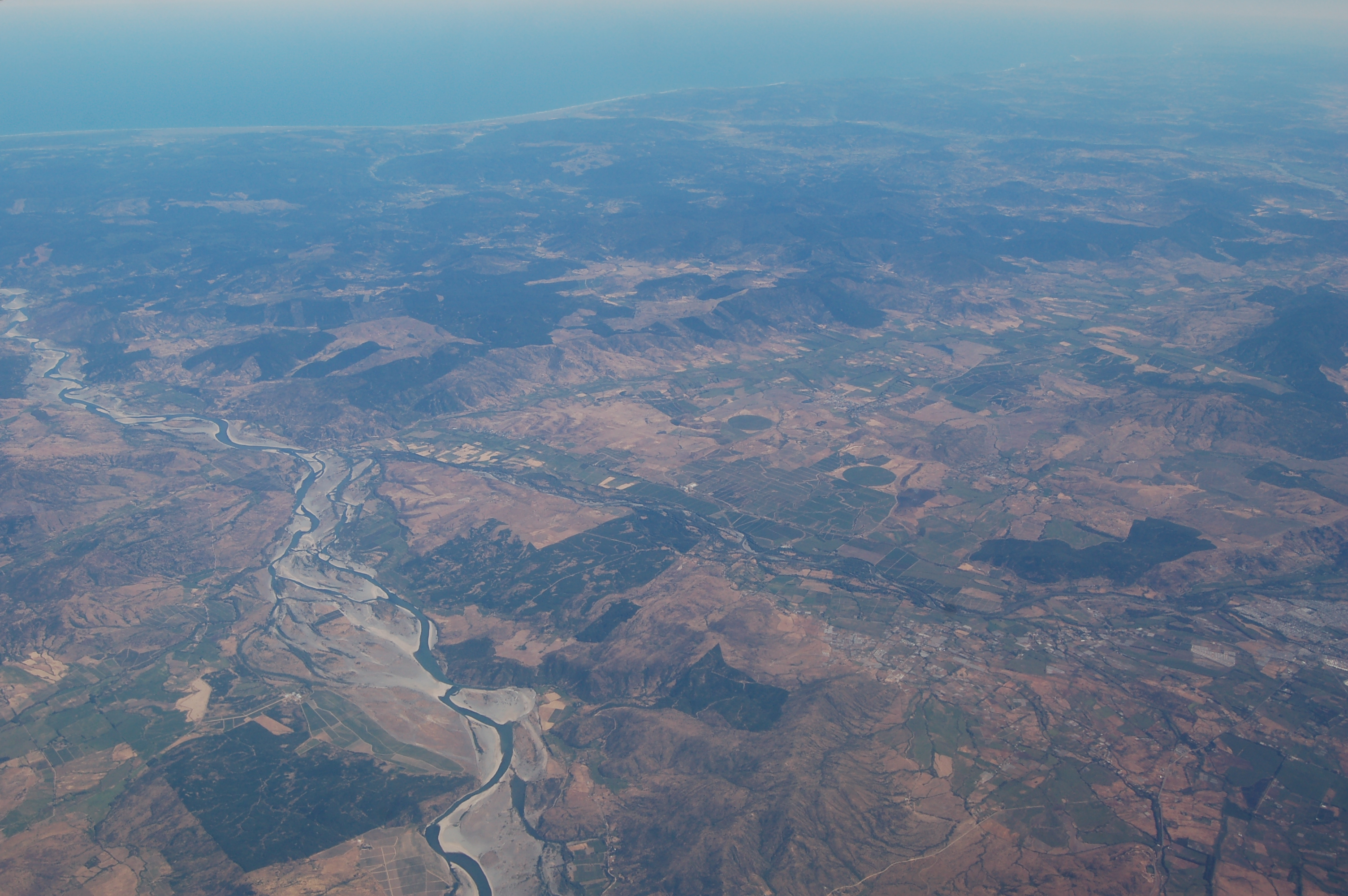
Another aerial view of Maule River

The Maule river or Río Maule (Mapudungun: rainy) is one of the most important rivers of Chile. It is inextricably linked to the country's pre-Hispanic (Inca) times, the country's conquest, colonial period, wars of Independence, modern history, agriculture (wine, traditional crops), culture (literature, poetry, folklore), religion, economy and politics. The Maule River marked the southern limits of the Inca Empire. Many famous men and women in Chile's history have been born in the Region named after the river. The river has also lent its name to one of the viticultural regions of the country (also known as appellations), the Valley of Maule, a subregion of the Central Valley.

== Upper reach ==
The river is 240 km long and its basin covers around 20,600 km^{2}. Thirty percent of the basin is located in the Andean range. It is born in Laguna del Maule in Talca Province, at an altitude of 2,200 mt in the vicinity of the border with Argentina. From that point the rivers flows westwardly and is soon joined on its left bank by one of its main tributaries, the Melado River, which is born in Laguna Dial, in Linares Province. Further on, and still in its upper course, the Maule is joined, this time on its right bank by rivers Colorado, Claro, Puelche and Cipreses.

== Middle reach ==
Before arriving at the central valley, the Maule is dammed into the Colbún dam lake that feeds the hydroelectric power station of the same name.

Further on, the Maule is joined by the Claro (another river named Claro) and the Loncomilla. The latter flows from the south and receives several tributaries: the Putagán, the Achibueno - Ancoa system, the Perquilauquén, the Purapel and the Cauquenes.

== Lower reach ==
In its lower reaches, the river receives only one modest tributary, the Estero de los Puercos and, after flowing for nearly 250 kilometers, the Maule ends at the Pacific Ocean, north of the city of Constitución.

== Ecology ==
The Maule River basin contains a number of significant flora and fauna of Chile. Historically the Chilean Wine Palm, Jubaea chilensis, was present in the Maule River basin; however, due to expansion of the human population in this region, this endangered tree has a more restricted range that still includes some of the northern portion of the Maule Region.

== Literary allusions ==
The Maule has been considered as Chile's literary river par excellence. The number of poets, writers, historians, orators, playwrights, journalists as well as composers and folk musicians that have been born or have settled in the Maule Region, to which "the river of the fogs" has given its name, is quite staggering. Many Latin American stories have had the river as the main background or protagonist. Several anthologies, author's dictionaries and essays have given vivid accounts of the vast cultural wealth of the region around river Maule.

== See also ==
- Battle of the Maule
- Ramal Talca-Constitución
- Founding of Talca
