= Central Chile =

Natural region of continental Chile

Coordinates: 35.33529°S 70.72998°W

Natural regions of Chile.

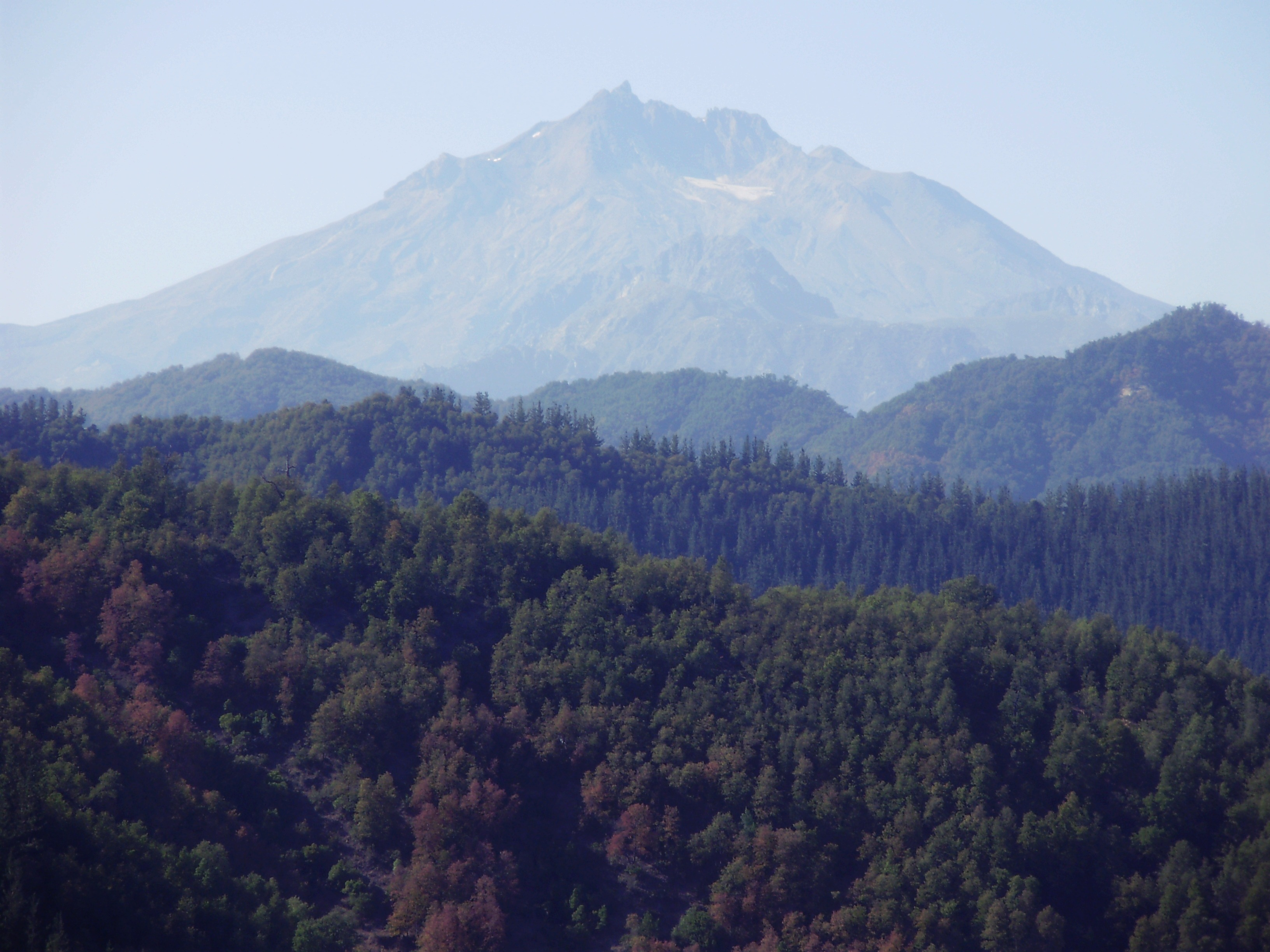
Nevado de Longaví is one of many volcanoes that rise out of the Andes in Central Chile.

Central Chile (Zona central) is one of the five natural regions into which CORFO divided continental Chile in 1950. It is home to a majority of the Chilean population and includes the three largest metropolitan areas—Santiago, Valparaíso, and Concepción. It extends from 32° south latitude to 37° south latitude.

== Geography ==
Central Chile is one of the five main geographical zones in which Chile is divided. The Chilean Central Valley lies between the coastal range ("Cordillera de la Costa") and the Andes Mountains. To the north is the semi-desert region known as El Norte Chico, (the "little north"), which lies between 28° and 32° south latitude. To the south lies the cooler and wetter Valdivian temperate rain forests ecoregion, in Los Lagos Region; (the latter includes most of South America's temperate rain forests). The Central valley is a fertile region and the agricultural heartland of Chile.

== Climate ==
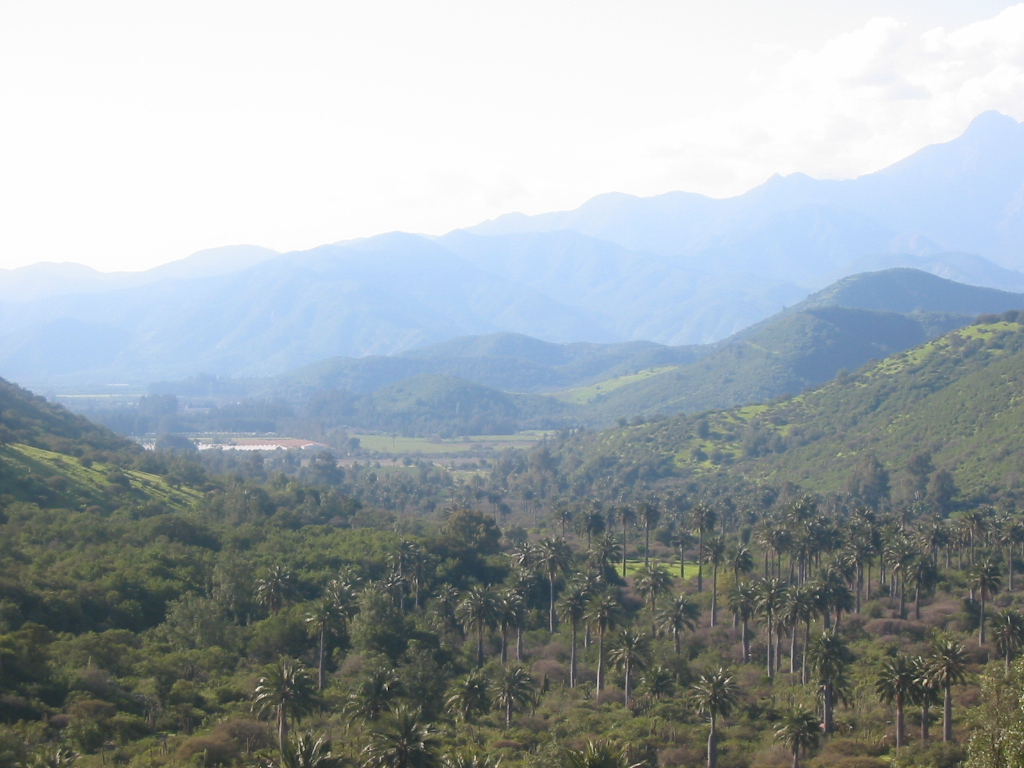
Endangered Chilean Wine Palms in La Campana National Park

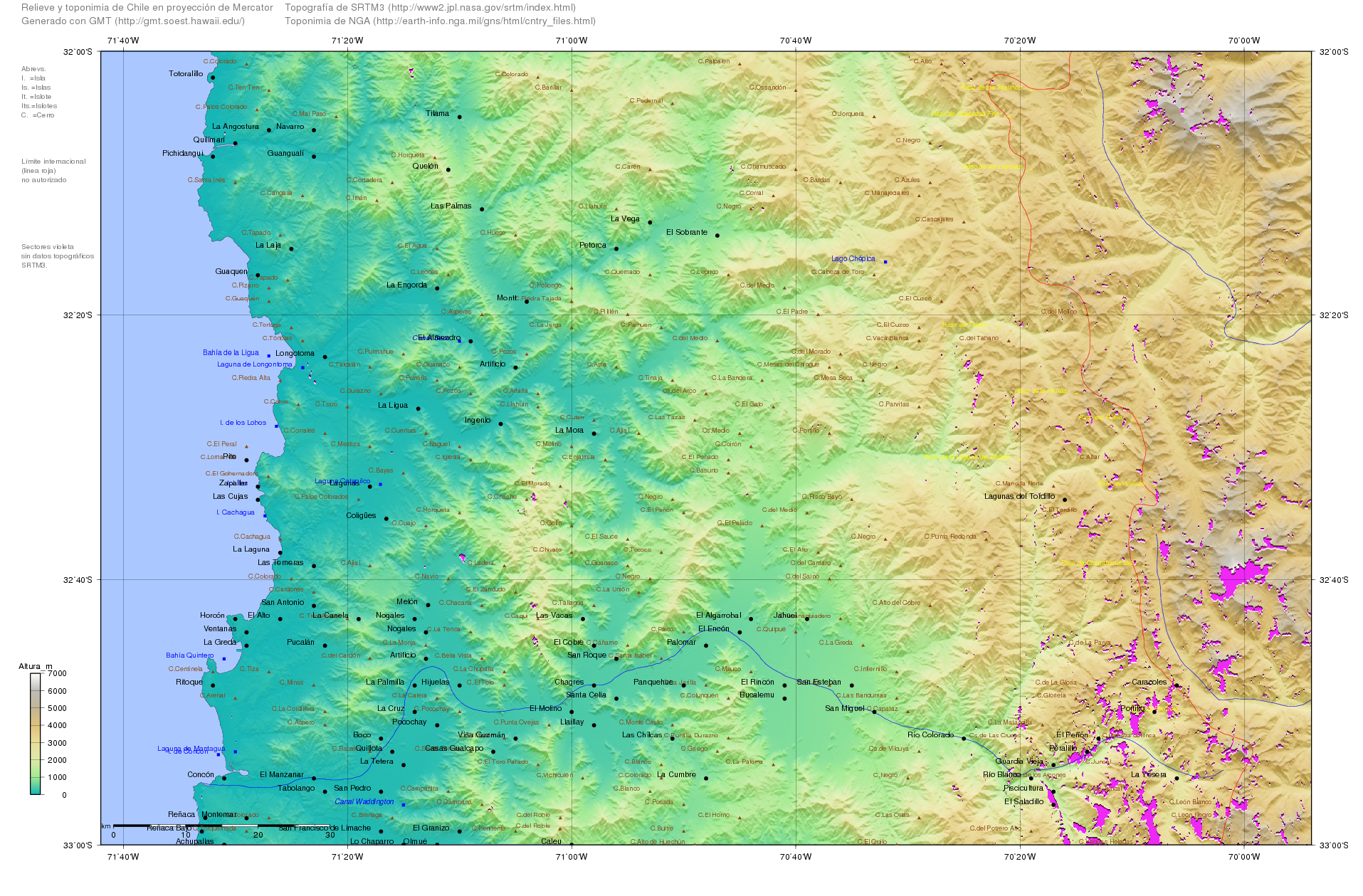
Quillota, Reñaca, Pichidangui, Aconcagua Valley

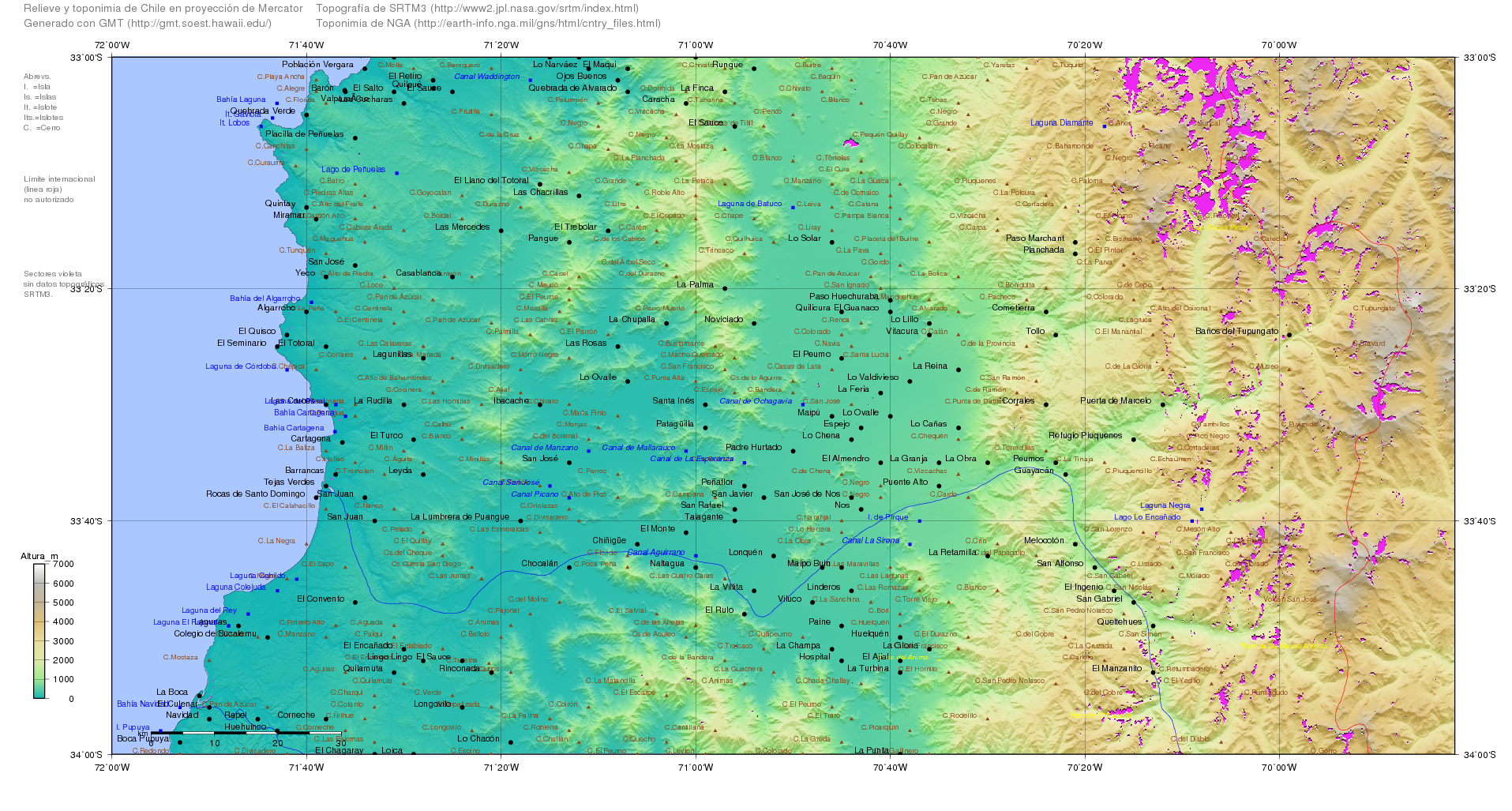
Valparaiso, Talagante, Santiago, San Antonio

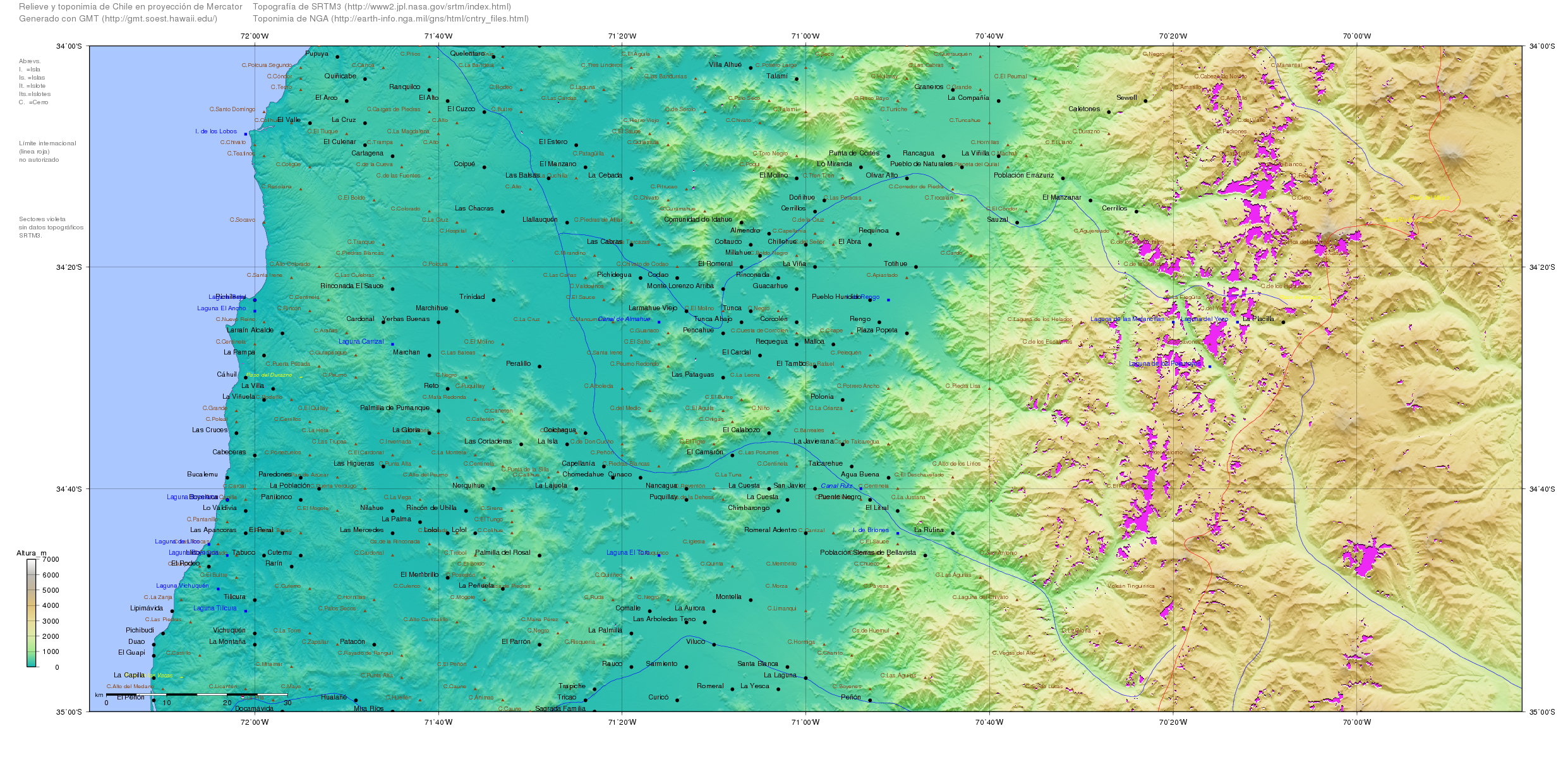
Chimbarongo, Rancagua

The climate is of the temperate Mediterranean type, with the amount of rainfall increasing considerably and progressively from north to south. In the Santiago area, the average high temperatures are about 30 °C (86 °F) in the summer months of January and February and 15 °C (59 °F) in the winter months of June and July. The average monthly precipitation is no more than a trace in January and February and 69.7 millimetres (2.74 in) in June and July. By contrast, in Concepción the average high temperatures are somewhat lower in the summer at 23 °C (73 °F) but higher in the winter at 13 °C (55 °F), and the amount of rain is much greater. In the summer, Concepción receives an average of twenty millimeters of rain per month; in June and July, the city is pounded by an average of 253 millimetres (10.0 in) per month. The numerous rivers greatly increase their flow as a result of the winter rains and the spring melting of the Andean snows, and they contract considerably in the summer. The combination of abundant snow in the Andes and relatively moderate winter temperatures creates excellent conditions for Alpine skiing.

The annual mean temperature in Santiago is 57 °F (14 °C). The temperate action of the ocean prevents temperatures from dropping drastically, and if snow falls in the area it does not usually stay on the ground for more than a few hours.

In Santiago the annual rainfall is 13 inches (330 mm) and in Valparaíso, it amounts to 15 inches (380 mm). Along the Central Valley rainfall increases gradually southward until it reaches 52 inches (1,300 mm) in Concepción.

The area has experienced a significant drought since 2010, and mean rainfall reduced by 20–40% between 2010 and 2018.

== Topography ==
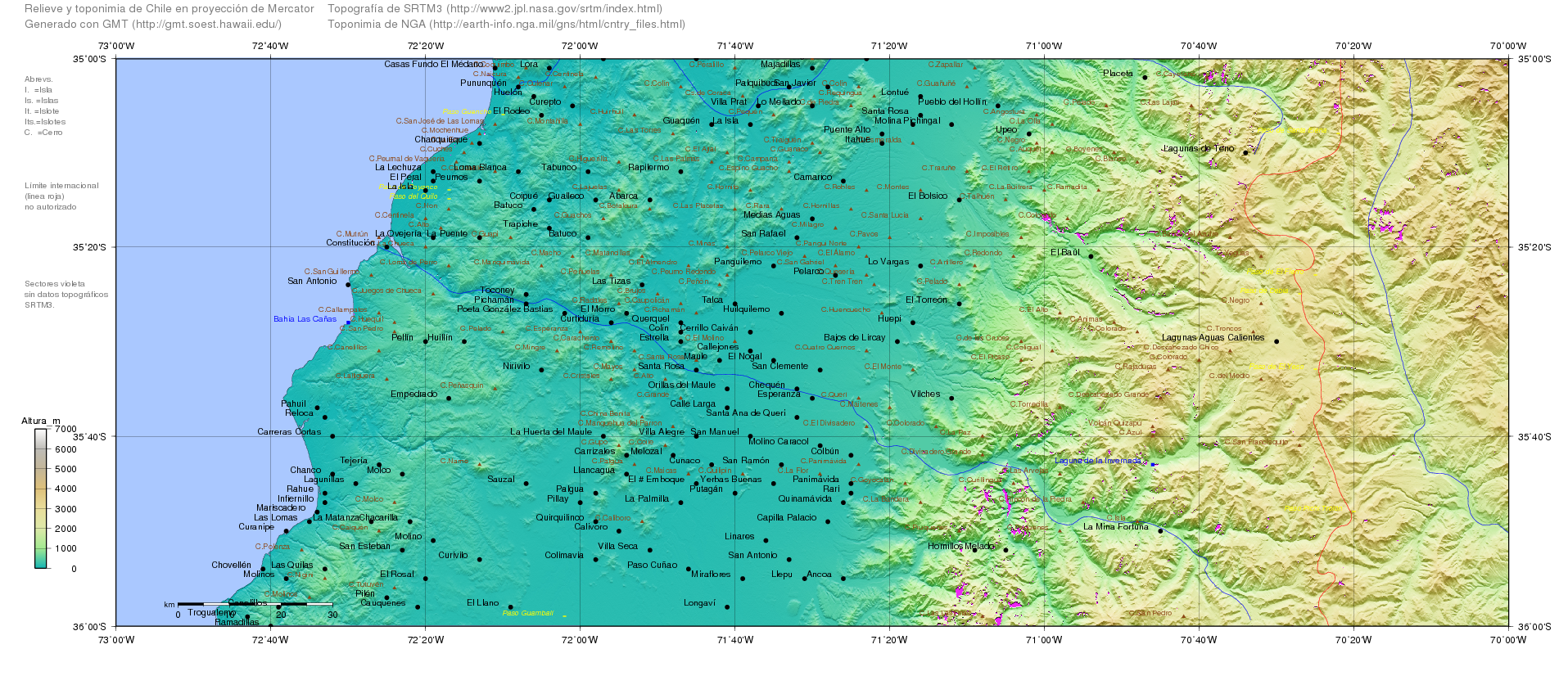
Talca, Linares

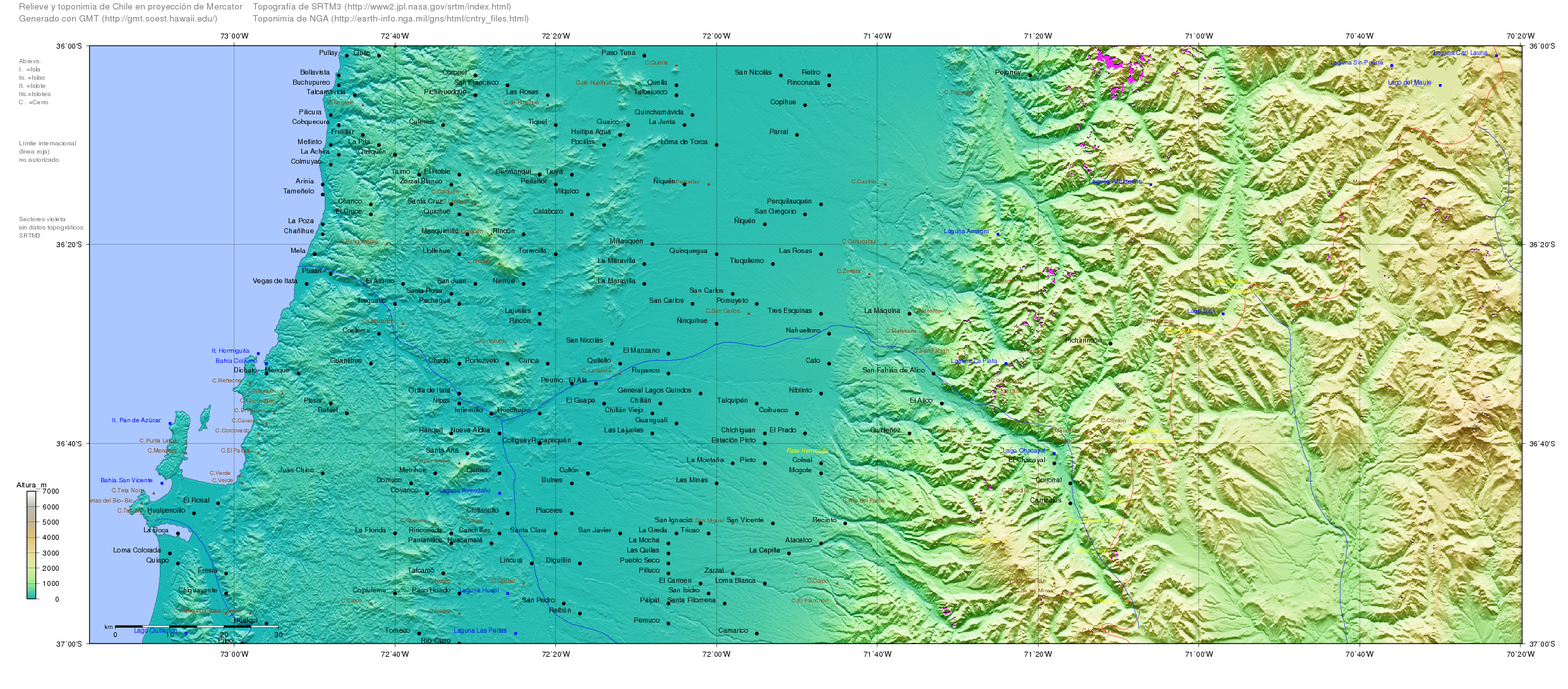
Chillán, Tomé

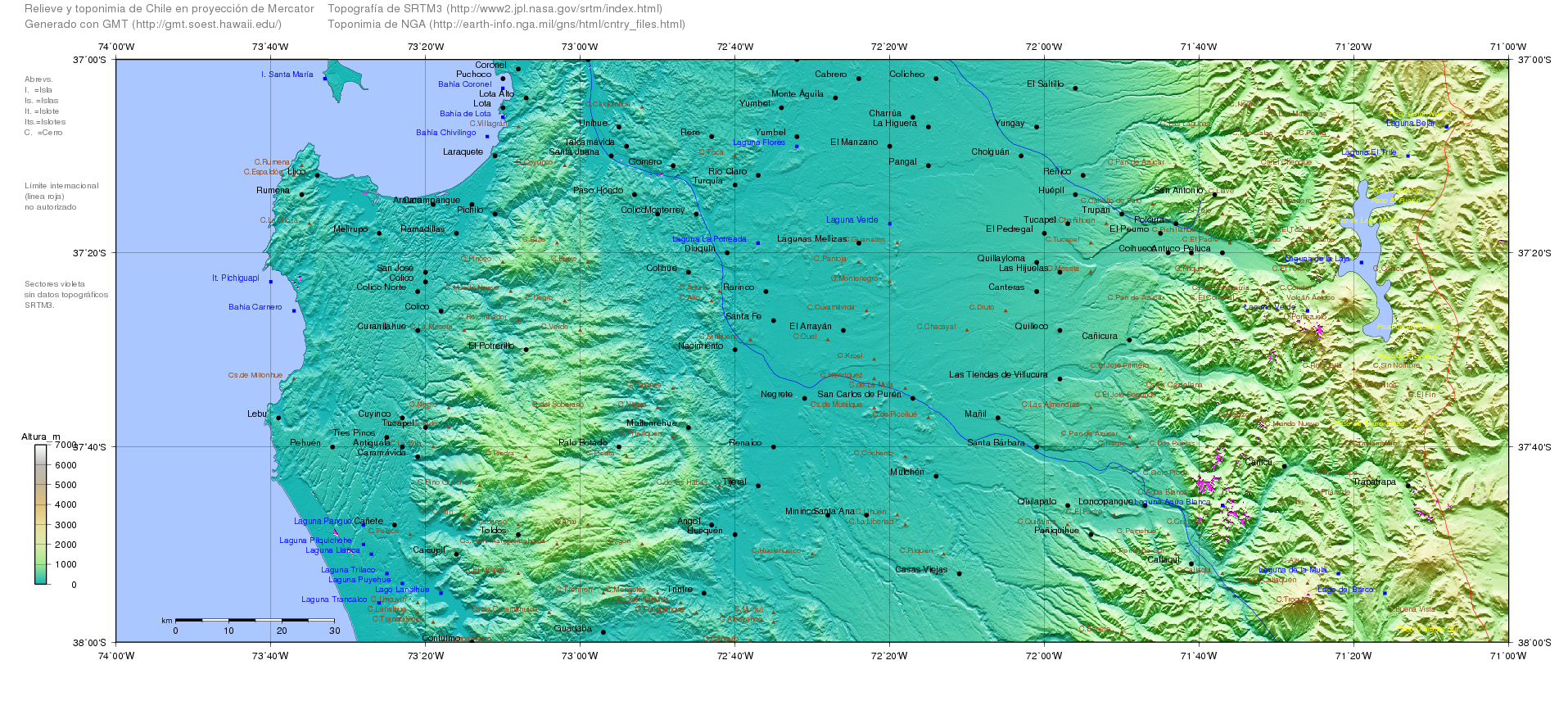
Nacimiento, Concepción, Los Angeles

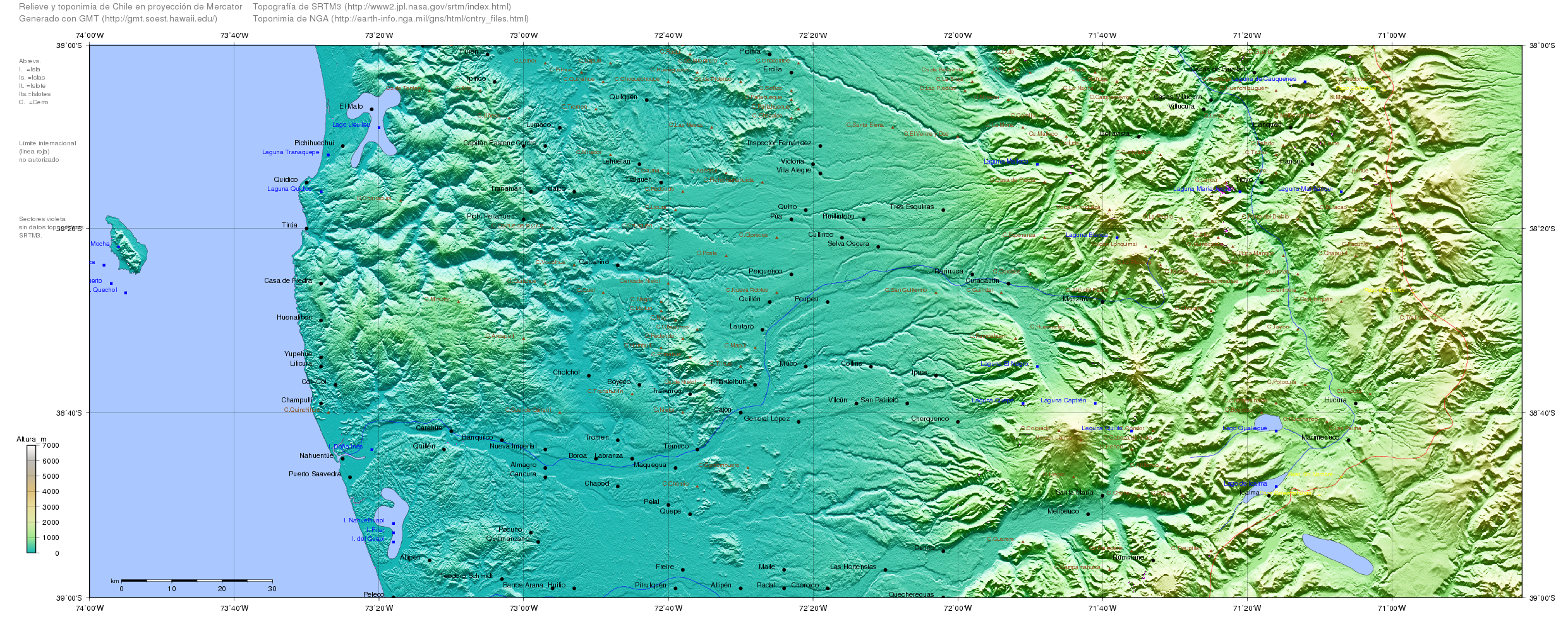
Temuco, Puerto Saavedra, Isla Mocha

The topography of central Chile includes a coastal range of mountains running parallel to the Andes. Lying between the two mountain ranges is the so-called Central Valley, which contains some of the richest agricultural land in the country, especially in its northern portion. The area just north and south of Santiago is a large producer of fruits, including the grapes from which the best Chilean wines are made. Exports of fresh fruit began to rise dramatically in the mid-1970s because Chilean growers had the advantage of being able to reach markets in the Northern Hemisphere during that part of the world's winter. Most of these exports, such as grapes, apples, and peaches, go by refrigerator ships, but some, such as berries, go by air freight.

The southern portion of central Chile contains a mixture of some excellent agricultural lands, many of which were covered originally with old-growth forests. They were cleared for agriculture but were soon exhausted of their organic matter and left to erode. Large tracts of this worn-out land, many of them on hilly terrain, have been reforested for the lumber, especially for the cellulose and paper industries. New investments during the 1980s in these industries transformed the rural economy of the region. The pre-Andean highlands and some of the taller and more massive mountains in the coastal range (principally the Cordillera de Nahuelbuta) still contain large tracts of old-growth forests of remarkable beauty, some of which have been set aside as national parks. Between the coastal mountains and the ocean, many areas of central Chile contain stretches of land that are lower than the Central Valley and are generally quite flat. The longest beaches can be found in such sections.

== Demography and economy ==
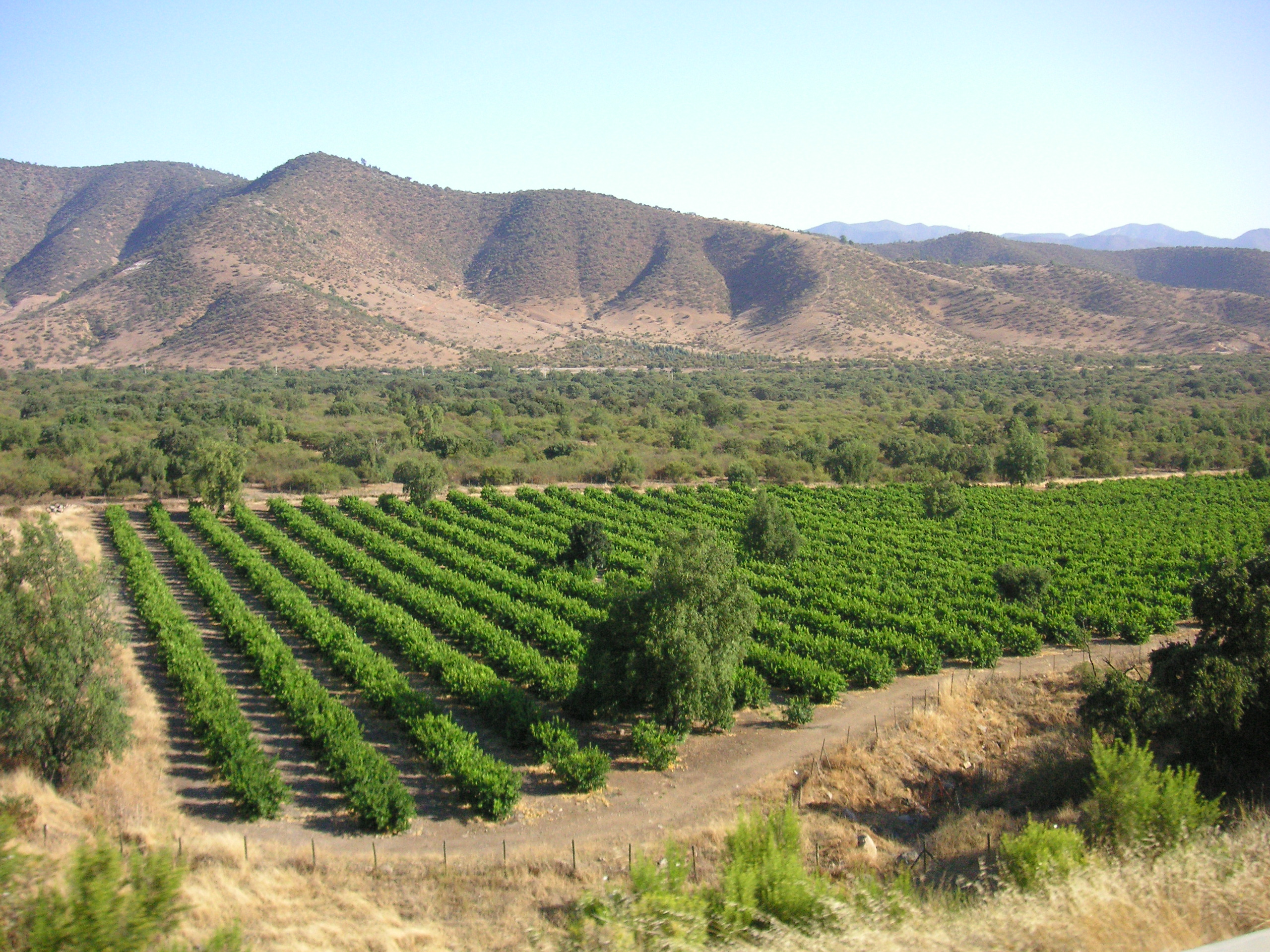
Many of Chile's vineyards are found on flat land within the foothills of the Andes.

From north to south; the following regions are traditionally considered as being part of Chile's central Valley:

- Valparaíso Region
- Santiago Metropolitan Region
- O'Higgins Region
- Maule Region
- Ñuble Region
- Bío-Bío Region

Historically, the Central valley has been the heartland of the country with the highest concentration of population (two thirds of the country's population) and, in addition, the area where the greater proportion of the economic productivity of the country is concentrated. Its economy is characterized by its diversity and the strongest pillars lie in the use of natural resources, through the copper mining, logging, agriculture and wine producing, fishing, and manufacturing sector.

The main cities are: Santiago, Valparaíso, Viña del Mar, Quilpué, Villa Alemana, Quillota, Puente Alto, San Antonio, Melipilla, Rancagua, Curicó, Talca, Linares, Chillán, Concepción, Talcahuano, Coronel and Los Ángeles.
