= Origin of the Mapuche =

Origin of indigenous inhabitants of South America

Approximate extent of indigenous cultures in Chile at the time of the arrival of the Spanish. Picunche, Mapuche, Huilliche and Cunco are all part of the Mapuche macro-ethnic group.

The origin of the Mapuche has been a matter of research for over a century. The genetics of the Mapuche do not show overly clear affinities with any other known indigenous group in the Americas, and the same goes for linguistics, where the Mapuche language is considered a language isolate. Archaeological evidence shows Mapuche culture has existed in Chile at least since 600 to 500 BC. Mapuches are late arrivals in their southernmost (Chiloé Archipelago) and easternmost (Pampas) areas of settlement, yet Mapuche history in the north towards Atacama Desert may be older than historic settlement suggest. The Mapuche have received significant influence from Pre-Incan (Tiwanaku?), Incan and Spanish peoples, but deep origins of the Mapuche predates these contacts. Contact and conflict with the Spanish Empire are thought by scholars such as Tom Dillehay and José Bengoa to have had a profound impact on the shaping of the Mapuche ethnicity.

Thus the Mapuches are considered of autochthonous origin, with some genetic studies and archaeological and linguistic hypothesis hinting an origin or influence from the Amazon in the distant past.

== Early theories ==
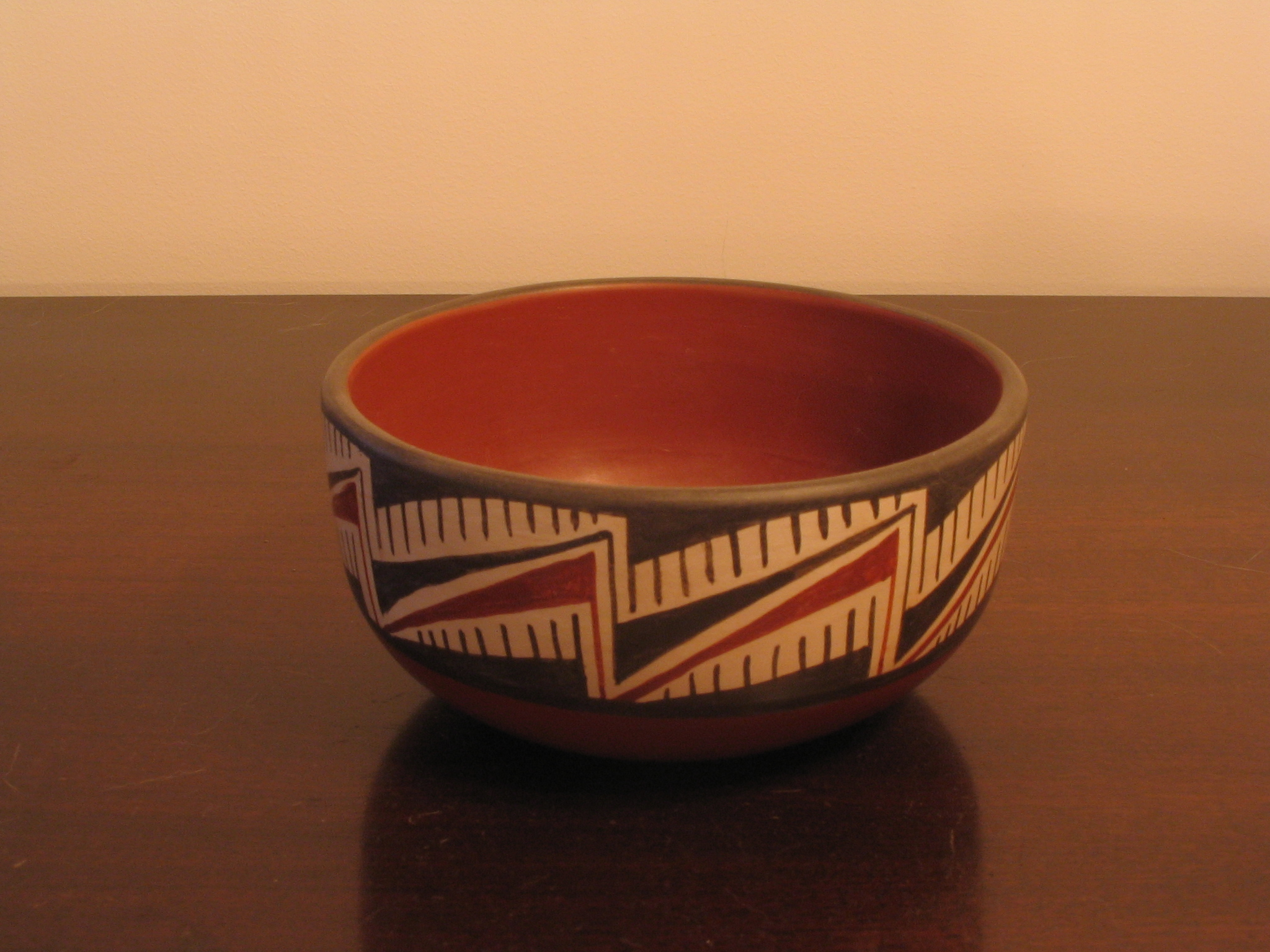
Replica of a Diaguita ceramic bowl from northern Chile. Ricardo E. Latcham's theory posits Mapuches intruded from the east into the southern Diaguita lands.

A hypothesis put forward by Ricardo E. Latcham, and later expanded by Francisco Antonio Encina, theorizes that the Mapuche migrated to present-day Chile from the Pampas east of the Andes. The hypothesis further claims that previous to the Mapuche, there was a "Chincha-Diaguita" culture, which was geographically cut in half by the Mapuche penetrating from mountain passes around the head of the Cautín River. Although the Latcham hypothesis is consistent with linguistic features it is rejected by modern scholars due to the lack of conclusive evidence, and the possibility of alternative hypotheses.

Tomás Guevara postulated another hypothesis claiming that early Mapuches dwelled on the coast exploiting the abundant marine resources and only later moved inland following large rivers. Guevara adds that Mapuches would be descendants of northern Changos, a poorly known coastal people, who moved southwards. Tenuous linguistic evidence links a language of 19th century Changos (called Chilueno or Arauco) with Mapudungun.

== Archaeology and toponymy ==
Scholar Alberto Trivera considers that there is no continuity between the human culture seen in the Late Pleistocene archaeological site of Monte Verde and any historical group. Archaeological finds have shown the existence of a Mapuche culture in Chile as early as 600 to 500 BC. In 1954 Grete Mostny postulated the idea of a link between Mapuches and the archaeological culture of El Molle in the Transverse Valleys of Norte Chico. The Mapuche Pitrén ceramics slightly postdate the ceramics of El Molle with which it shares various commonalities. Various archaeologists including Grete Mostny are of the idea that El Molle culture is in turn related to cultures of the Argentine Northwest, chiefly Candelaria, which are in turn suggested to be related to more northern "tropical jungle" cultures. Tembetás, lower lip piercings usually associated with indigenous cultures in Brazil, findings have been reported in Central Chile with scholars differing if these elements the result of migrations or some other type of ancient contact with the Argentine Northwest. (Note: The tembletá is by no means unique to the Argentine Northwest, the Chaco and Brazil but it also been found in archaeological sites in San Pedro de Atacama and Condorhuasi and is besides this also known from parts of Africa and Asia.)

Mapuche communities in southern Norte Chico –that is Petorca, La Ligua, Combarbalá and Choapa – may be rooted in Pre-Hispanic times at least several centuries before the Spanish arrival. Mapuche toponymy is also found throughout the area. While there was an immigration of Mapuches to the southern Diaguita lands in colonial times Mapuche culture there is judged to be older than this. Further north in the coast of Antofagasta Region there are toponyms claimed to be Mapuche including Taltal and Quebrada Mamilla.

Archaeological remains indicating cultivation in canalized fields and raised fields by the Mapuche imply these techniques were likely introduced either from Lake Titicaca in the Altiplano or the Amazonian lowlands.

Mapuches are late arrivals in Chiloé Archipelago where there are various placenames with Chono etymologies despite the main indigenous language of the archipelago at the arrival of the Spanish being veliche (Mapuche). This is in line with notions of ethnologist Ricardo E. Latcham who consider the Chono along other sea-faring nomads may be remnants from more widespread indigenous groups that were pushed south by "successive invasions" from more northern tribes.

== Genetic studies ==
Genetically Mapuches differ from the adjacent indigenous peoples of Patagonia. This is interpreted as suggesting either a "different origin or long lasting separation of Mapuche and Patagonian populations". A 1996 study comparing genetics of indigenous groups in Argentina found no significant link between Mapuches and other groups. A 2019 study on the human leukocyte antigen genetics of Mapuche from Cañete found affinities with a variety of North and South American indigenous groups. Notably, and besides similarities to nearby groups, the study found also affinities with distant groups such Aleuts, Eskimos, Pacific Islanders, Ainu from Japan, Negidals from Eastern Siberia and Rapa Nui from Easter Island.

Based on mDNA analysis of various indigenous groups of South America it is thought that Mapuche are at least in part descendant of peoples from the Amazon Basin that migrated to Chile through two routes; one through the Central Andean highlands and another through the eastern Gran Chaco and the Argentine Northwest.

A 2023 study establishes that Mapuches are generically closer to other groups of Patagonia than to Central Andean or Amazonian tribes. Mapuches would have drifted away genetically from the indigenous groups of southern Patagonia in the Middle Holocene. After this genetic flow from Amazonian and Central Andean tribes was limited, despite evidence of cultural diffusion from that area, and a brief period of Inca rule in Central Chile. In historic times the southernmost of the Mapuche groups, the Huilliche of Chiloé Archipelago have incorporated genes from the southern Patagonian tribes.

== Linguistics ==
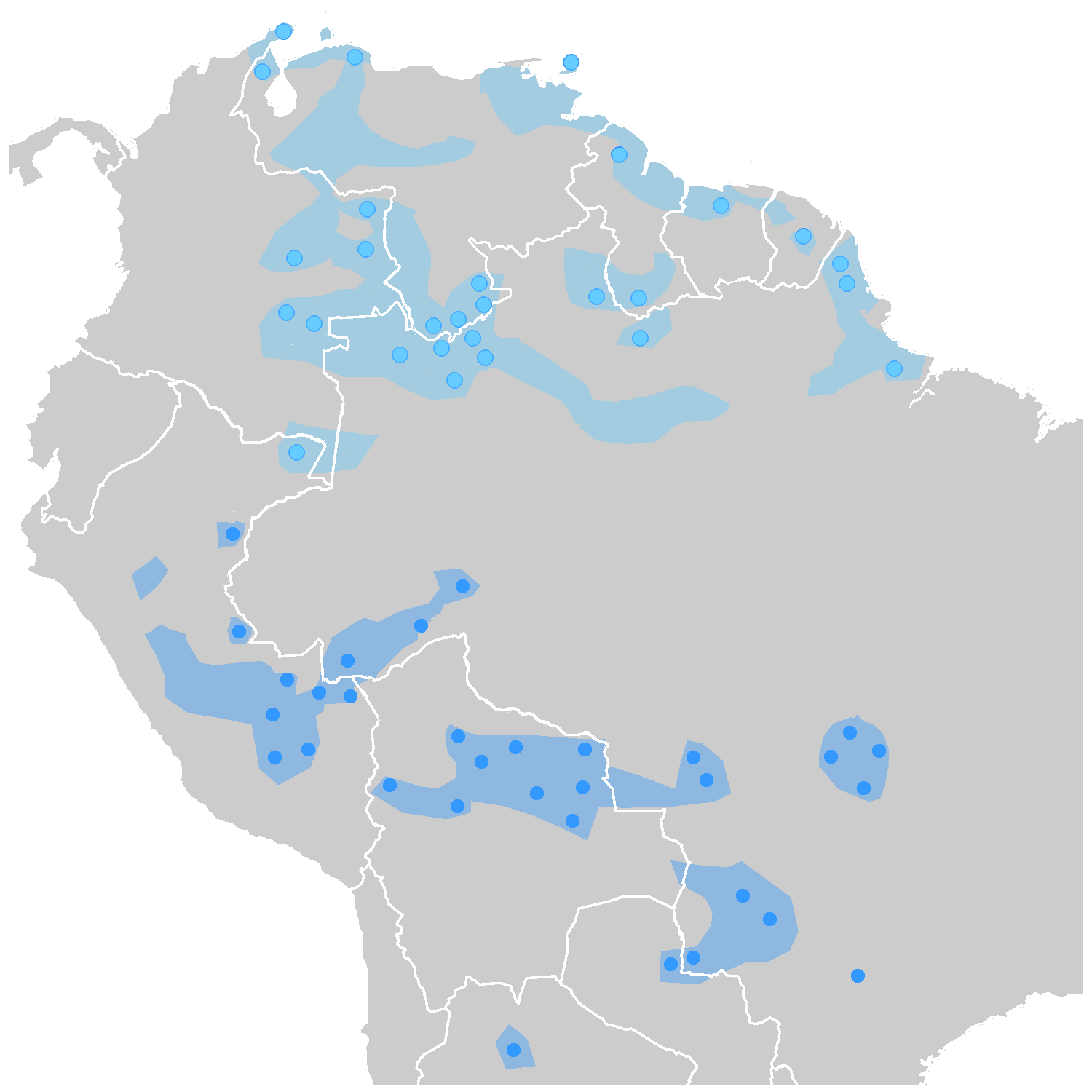
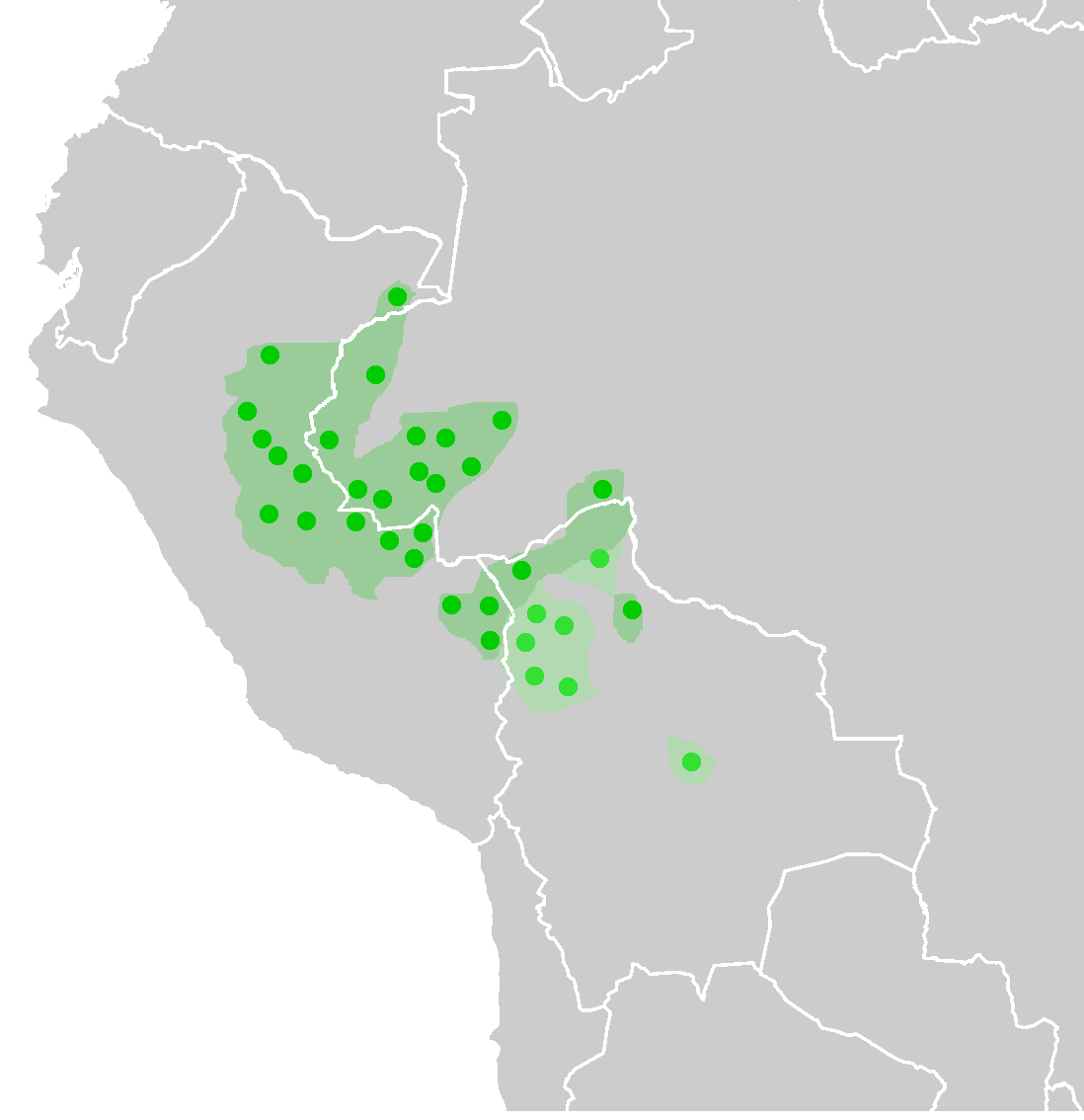
Reconstructed distribution of the Arawakan (left) and Pano-Tacanan languages (right). Both language families have been suggested to be linked to Mapuche.

There is no consensus on the linguistic affiliation of the Mapuche language, Mapudungun. In the early 1970s, significant linguistic affinities between Mapuche and Mayan languages were suggested. Linguist Mary Ritchie Key claimed in 1978 that Araucanian languages, including Mapuche, were genetically linked to the Pano-Tacanan languages, to the Chonan languages and the Kawéskar languages. Croese (1989, 1991) has advanced the hypothesis that Mapudungun is related to the Arawakan languages. The word for "stone axe" in Mapuche language is toki similar to the Yurumanguí totoki ("axe") from Colombia.

Mapuche language do have many words in common with Quechua, Aymara and Puquina. This reflects however a later influence of Andean culture and perhaps migrating populations on the already existing Mapuche. This areal linguistic influence may have arrived with a migratory wave arising from the collapse of the Tiwanaku Empire around 1000 CE. Jolkesky (2016) considers that Mapuche's lexical similarities with the Kunza, Mochika, Uru-Chipaya, Arawak, Pano, Cholon-Hibito, and Kechua language families are due to contact.

== Historiography and late ethnogenesis ==
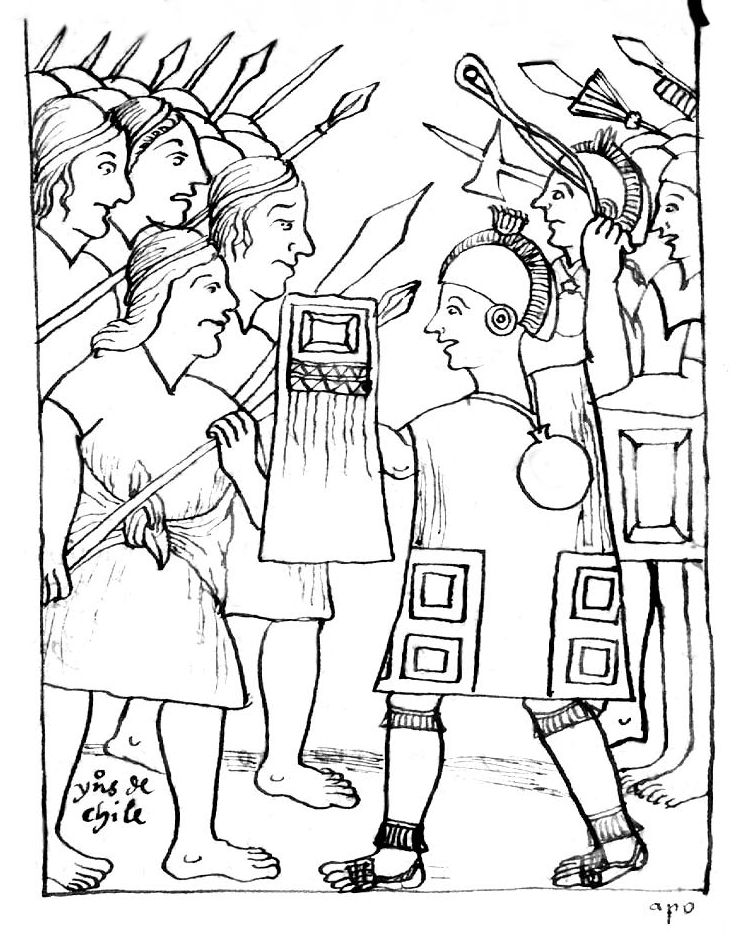
Huamán Poma de Ayala's picture of the confrontation between the Mapuches (left) and the Incas (right) during the Battle of the Maule.

A milestone in Mapuche ethnogenesis may have been their contact with Inca invaders which gave them a collective awareness distinguishing between them and the invaders and uniting them into loose geo-political units despite their lack of state organization.

Many historians, such as José Bengoa, are inclined to hold that the Mapuche proper welded into a single ethnic group during the Arauco War against the Spanish. According to scholars Tom Dillehay and Francisco Rothhammer this view is supported by archaeology which indicates that formerly scattered indigenous populations begun to dwell in more dense population clusters are the result of warfare.

== Mapuche opinions and oral traditions ==
Among Mapuches living near the coast there are those who consider they arrived from the sea. Other Mapuches claim descent from the people of Monte Verde, the earliest archaeological site in Chile.

== Bibliography ==
- Bengoa, José (2000). Historia del pueblo mapuche: Siglos XIX y XX (in Spanish) (Seventh ed.). LOM Ediciones. ISBN 978-956-282-232-9.
- Bengoa, José (2003). Historia de los antiguos mapuches del sur (in Spanish). Santiago: Catalonia. ISBN 978-956-8303-02-0.
- Mostny, Grete (1983) [1981]. Prehistoria de Chile (in Spanish) (6th ed.). Santiago de Chile: Editorial Universitaria.
- Téllez, Eduardo (2008). Los Diaguitas: Estudios (in Spanish). Santiago, Chile: Ediciones Akhilleus. ISBN 978-956-8762-00-1.
- Trivero Rivera, Alberto (2005). Los primeros pobladores de Chiloé: Génesis del horizonte mapuche (in Spanish). Ñuque Mapuförlaget. ISBN 91-89629-28-0.
