= Mapuche history =

As an archaeological culture, the Mapuche people of southern Chile and Argentina have a long history which dates back to 600–500 BC. The Mapuche society underwent great transformations after Spanish contact in the mid–16th century. These changes included the adoption of Old World crops and animals and the onset of a rich Spanish–Mapuche trade in La Frontera and Valdivia. Despite these contacts Mapuche were never completely subjugated by the Spanish Empire. Between the 18th and 19th century Mapuche culture and people spread eastwards into the Pampas and the Patagonian plains. This vast new territory allowed Mapuche groups to control a substantial part of the salt and cattle trade in the Southern Cone.

Between 1861 and 1883 the Republic of Chile conducted a series of campaigns that ended Mapuche independence causing the death of thousands of Mapuche through combat, pillaging, starvation and smallpox epidemics. Argentina conducted similar campaigns on the eastern side of the Andes in the 1870s. In large parts of the Mapuche lands the traditional economy collapsed forcing thousands to seek themselves to the large cities and live in impoverished conditions as housemaids, hawkers or labourers.

From the late 20th century onwards Mapuche people have been increasingly active in conflicts over land rights and indigenous rights.

== Pre-Columbian period ==
=== Origins ===
Archaeological finds have shown the existence of a Mapuche culture in Chile as early as 600 to 500 BC. Genetically Mapuches differ from the adjacent indigenous peoples of Patagonia. This is interpreted as suggesting either a "different origin or long lasting separation of Mapuche and Patagonian populations". A 1996 study comparing genetics of indigenous groups in Argentina found no significant link between Mapuches and other groups. A 2019 study on the human leukocyte antigen genetics of Mapuche from Cañete found affinities with a variety of North and South American indigenous groups. Notably the study found affinities also with Aleuts, Eskimos, Pacific Islanders, Ainu from Japan, Negidals from Eastern Siberia and Rapa Nui from Easter Island.

There is no consensus on the linguistic affiliation of the Mapuche language, Mapudungun. In the early 1970s, significant linguistic affinities between Mapuche and Mayan languages were suggested. Linguist Mary Ritchie Key claimed in 1978 that Araucanian languages, including Mapuche, were genetically linked to the Pano-Tacanan languages, to the Chonan languages and the Kawéskar languages. Croese (1989, 1991) has advanced the hypothesis that Mapudungun is related to the Arawakan languages.

In 1954 Grete Mostny postulated the idea of a link between Mapuches and the archaeological culture of El Molle in the Transverse Valleys of Norte Chico. This idea was followed up by Patricio Bustamante in 2007. Mapuche communities in the southern Diaguita lands –that is Petorca, La Ligua, Combarbalá and Choapa – may be rooted in Pre-Hispanic times at least several centuries before the Spanish arrival. Mapuche toponymy is also found throughout the area. While there was an immigration of Mapuches to the southern Diaguita lands in colonial times Mapuche culture there is judged to be older than this.

Based on mDNA analysis of various indigenous groups of South America it is thought that Mapuche are at least in part descendant of peoples from the Amazon Basin that migrated to Chile through two routes; one through the Central Andean highlands and another through the eastern Bolivian lowlands and the Argentine Northwest.

A hypothesis put forward by Ricardo E. Latcham, and later expanded by Francisco Antonio Encina, theorizes that the Mapuche migrated to present-day Chile from the Pampas east of the Andes. The hypothesis further claims that previous to the Mapuche, there was a "Chincha-Diaguita" culture, which was geographically cut in half by the Mapuche penetrating from mountain passes around the head of the Cautín River. Albeit the Latcham hypothesis is consistent with linguistic features it is rejected by modern scholars due to the lack of conclusive evidence, and the possibility of alternative hypotheses.

Tomás Guevara has postulated another unproven hypothesis claiming that early Mapuches dwelled at the coast due to abundant marine resources and only later moved inland following large rivers. Guevara adds that Mapuches would be descendants of northern Changos, a poorly known coastal people, who moved southwards. This hypothesis is supported by tenuous linguistic evidence linking a language of 19th century Changos (called Chilueno or Arauco) with Mapudungun.

According to a theory of historian Roberto E. Porcel the Mapuche were descendants of a group of Aymaras that migrated south as consequence of a conflict between Antisuyu and Contisuyu.

=== Tiwanaku and Puquina influence ===
It has been conjectured that the collapse of the Tiwanaku empire about 1000 CE caused a southward migratory wave leading to a series of changes in Mapuche society in Chile. This explains how the Mapuche language obtained many loanwords from Puquina language including antu (sun), calcu (warlock), cuyen (moon), chadi (salt) and ñuque (mother). Tom Dillehay and co-workers suggest that the decline of Tiwanaku would have led to the spread of agricultural techniques into Mapuche lands in south-central Chile. These techniques include the raised fields of Budi Lake and the canalized fields found in Lumaco Valley.

...dispersing [Tiwanaku] populations in search of new suitable environments might have caused long-distance ripple effects of both migration and technological diffusion across the south-central and south Andes between c.AD 1100 and 1300...

— Tom Dillehay and co-workers.

A cultural linkage of this sort may help explain parallels in mythological cosmologies among Mapuches and peoples of the Central Andes.

=== Possible Polynesian contact ===
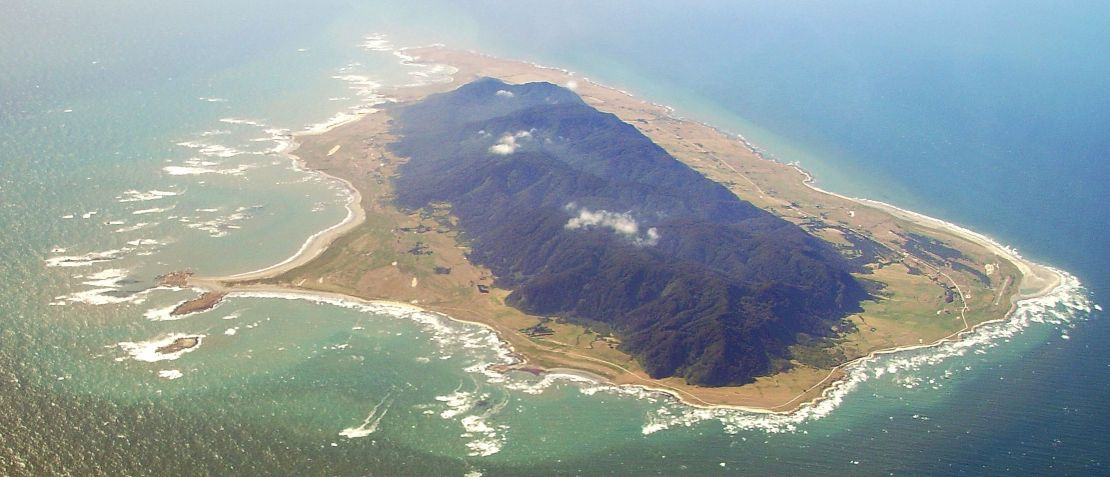
Mocha Island off the coast of Arauco Peninsula, Chile

In 2007, evidence appeared to have been found that suggested pre-Columbian contact between Polynesians from the western Pacific and the Mapuche people. Chicken bones found at the El Arenal site in the Arauco Peninsula, an area inhabited by Mapuche, support a pre-Columbian introduction of chicken to South America. The bones found in Chile were carbon-dated to between 1304 and 1424, before the arrival of the Spanish. Chicken DNA sequences taken were matched to those of chickens in present-day American Samoa and Tonga; they did not match the DNA of European chickens. However, a later report in the same journal, assessing the same mtDNA, concluded that the Chilean chicken specimen matches with the European/Indian subcontinental/Southeast Asian sequences. Thus, it may not support a Polynesian introduction of chickens to South America.

In December 2007, several human skulls with Polynesian features, such as rocker jaws and pentagonal shape when viewed from behind, were found lying on a shelf in a museum in Concepción. These skulls turned out to have come from people of Mocha Island, an island just off the coast of Chile in the Pacific Ocean, today inhabited by Mapuche. Professor Lisa Matisoo-Smith of the University of Otago and José Miguel Ramírez Aliaga of the University of Valparaíso hope to win agreement soon with the locals of Mocha Island to begin an excavation to search for Polynesian remains on the island. Rocker jaws have also been found at an excavation led Ramírez in pre-Hispanic tombs and shell middens (Spanish: conchal) of the coastal locality of Tunquén, Central Chile.

According to Ramírez "more than a dozen Mapuche - Rapa Nui cognates have been described". Among these are the Mapuche words toki (axe), kuri (black) and piti (little).

The Mapuche clava hand club have striking similarities with the Maori wahaika.

=== Mapuche expansion into Chiloé Archipelago ===
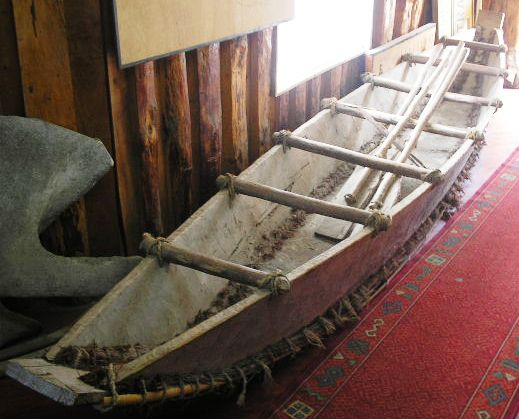
Reconstruction of a dalca in the museum of Dalcahue. This kind of boat was used by both Chonos and the Mapuche of Chiloé (Cunco, Huilliche, Veliche). More northern Mapuche used simpler watercraft called wampu.

A theory postulated by chronicler José Pérez García holds the Cunco (Note: The indigenous inhabitants of the northern half of Chiloé Island, of Mapuche culture, are variously referred as Cunco, Huilliche or Veliche.) settled in Chiloé Island in Pre-Hispanic times as consequence of a push from more northern Huilliche who in turn were being displaced by Mapuche.

Evidence for a Chono past of the southernmost Mapuche lands in Chiloé and the nearby mainland are various placenames with Chono etymologies despite the main indigenous language of the archipelago at the arrival of the Spanish being veliche (Mapuche). This is in line with notions of ethnologist Ricardo E. Latcham who consider the Chono along other sea-faring nomads may be remnants from more widespread indigenous groups that were pushed south by "successive invasions" from more northern tribes.

The Payos, an indigenous group in southern Chiloé encountered by the Spanish, may have been Chonos en route to acculturate into the Mapuche.

=== Inca expansion and influence ===
Troops of the Inca Empire are reported to have reached Maule River and had a battle with Mapuches from Maule River and Itata River there. The southern border of the Inca Empire is believed by most modern scholars to be situated between Santiago and the Maipo River or somewhere between Santiago and the Maule River. Spanish chroniclers Miguel de Olavarría and Diego de Rosales claimed the Inca frontier laid much further south at the Bío Bío River. While historian José Bengoa concludes that Inca troops apparently never crossed the Bío Bío River, chronicler Diego de Rosales gives an account of the Incas crossing the river going south all the way to La Imperial and returning north through Tucapel along the coast.

The main settlements of the Inca Empire in Chile lay along the Aconcagua River, Mapocho River and the Maipo River. Quillota in Aconcagua Valley was likely their foremost settlement. As a result of Inca rule there was some Mapudungun–Imperial Quechua bilingualism among Mapuches of Aconcagua Valley. Salas argues that Mapuche, Quechua and Spanish coexisted with significant bilingualism in Central Chile (between the Mapocho and Bío Bío rivers) during the 17th century.

As appears to be the case with the other borders of the Inca Empire, the southern border was composed of several zones: first, an inner, fully incorporated zone with mitimaes protected by a line of pukaras (fortresses) and then an outer zone with Inca pukaras scattered among allied tribes. This outer zone would, according to historian José Bengoa, have been located between the Maipo and Maule Rivers.

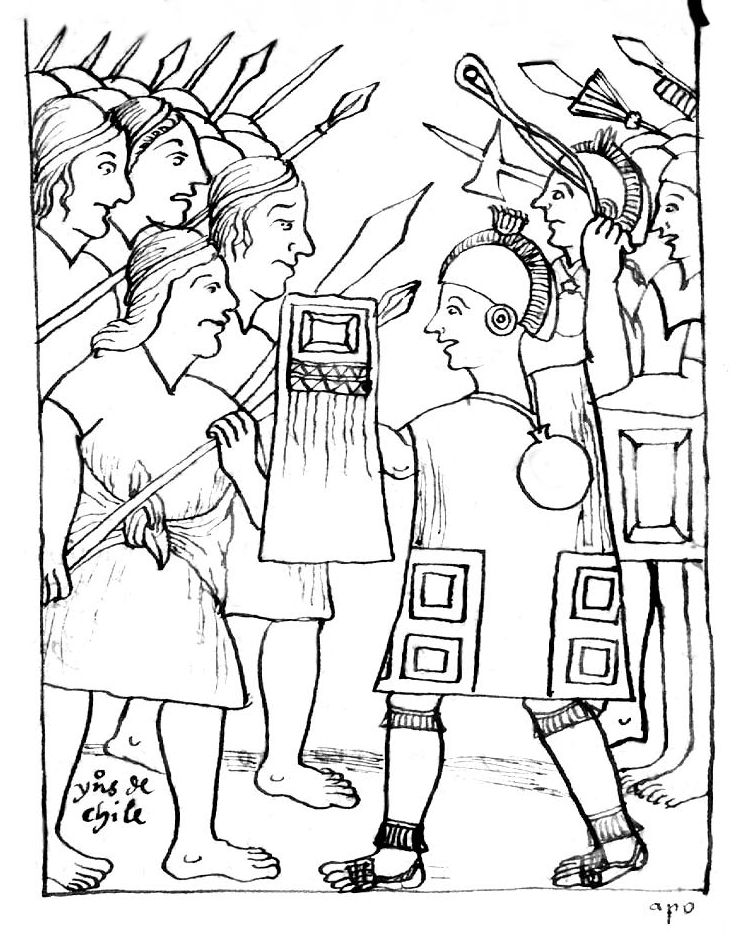
Felipe Guaman Poma de Ayala's picture of the confrontation between the Mapuche (left) and the Inca Empire (right)

Incan yanakuna are believed by archaeologists Tom Dillehay and Américo Gordon to have extracted gold south of the Incan frontier in free Mapuche territory. Following this thought the main motif for Incan expansion into Mapuche territory would have been to access gold mines. Same archaeologists also claim that all early Mapuche pottery at Valdivia is of Inca design. Inca influence can also be evidenced as far south as Osorno Province (latitude 40–41° S) in the form of Quechua and Quechua–Aymara toponyms. Alternatively these toponyms originated in colonial times from the population of the Valdivian Fort System that served as a penal colony linked to the Peruvian port of El Callao.

Gold and silver bracelets and "sort of crowns" were used by Mapuches in the Concepción area at the time of the Spanish arrival as noted by Jerónimo de Vivar. This is interpreted either as Incan gifts, war spoils from defeated Incas, or adoption of Incan metallurgy.

Through their contact with Incan invaders Mapuches would have for the first time met people with state-level organization. Their contact with the Inca gave them a collective awareness distinguishing between them and the invaders and uniting them into loose geopolitical units despite their lack of state organization.

== Mapuche society at the arrival of the Spanish ==
=== Demography and settlement types ===
At the time of the arrival of the first Spaniards to Chile the largest indigenous population concentration was in the area spanning from Itata River to Chiloé Archipelago—that is the Mapuche heartland. The Mapuche population between Itata River and Reloncaví Sound has been estimated at 705,000–900,000 in the mid-16th century by historian José Bengoa. (Note: Note that the Chiloé Archipelago with its large population is not included in this estimate.)

Mapuches lived in scattered hamlets, mainly along the great rivers of Southern Chile. All major population centres lay at the confluences of rivers. Mapuches preferred to build their houses on hilly terrain or isolated hills rather than on plains and terraces.

=== Mythology and religion ===
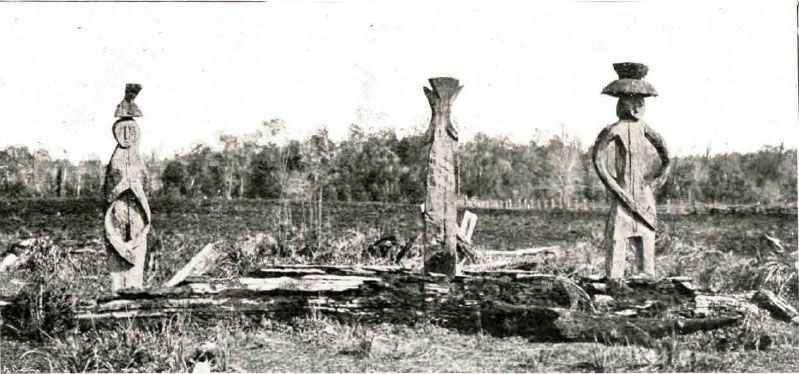
Mapuche graveyard

The machi (shaman), a role usually played by older women, is an extremely important part of the Mapuche culture. The machi performs ceremonies for the warding off of evil, for rain, for the cure of diseases, and has an extensive knowledge of Chilean medicinal herbs, gained during an arduous apprenticeship. Chileans of all origins and classes make use of the many traditional herbs known to the Mapuche. The main healing ceremony performed by the machi is called the machitun.

Wampus were used in funerals and they are present in narratives about death in Mapuche religion.

=== Social organization ===
The politics, economy and religion of the pre- and early-contact Mapuches were based on the lineages of local communities called lov. This kind of organization was replicated at the larger rehue level that encompassed several lov. The politics of each lineage were not equally aggressive or submissive, but different from case to case. Lineages were patrilineal and patrilocal. Polygamy was common among Mapuches and together with the custom of feminine exogamy it has been credited by José Bengoa with welding the Mapuche into one people.

Early Mapuches had two types of leaders, secular and religious. The religious were machi, hechicero and the boquivoye. The secular were the reche, ülmen and gentyoke. Later the secular leaders were known as lonko, toki, ülmen and weupin.

=== Economy ===
In South-Central Chile most Mapuche groups practised glade agriculture among the forests. Other agriculture types existed; while some Mapuches and Huilliches practised a slash-and-burn type of agriculture, some more labour-intensive agriculture is known to have been developed by Mapuches around Budi Lake (raised fields) and the Lumaco and Purén valleys (canalized fields). Potato was the staple food of most Mapuches, "specially in the southern and coastal [Mapuche] territories where maize did not reach maturity". The bulk of the Mapuche population worked in agriculture. Mapuches did also cultivate quinoa, but it is not known if the variety originated in Central Chile or in the Central Andes.

In addition the Mapuche and Huilliche economy was complemented with Araucana chicken and chilihueque raising and collection of Araucaria araucana and Gevuina avellana seeds. The southern coast was particularly rich in molluscs, algaes, crustaceans and fish and Mapuches were known to be good fishers. Hunting was also a common activity among Mapuches. The forests provided firewood, fibre and allowed the production of planks.

Mapuche territory had an effective system of roads before the Spanish arrival as evidenced by the fast advances of the Spanish conquerors.

=== Technology ===
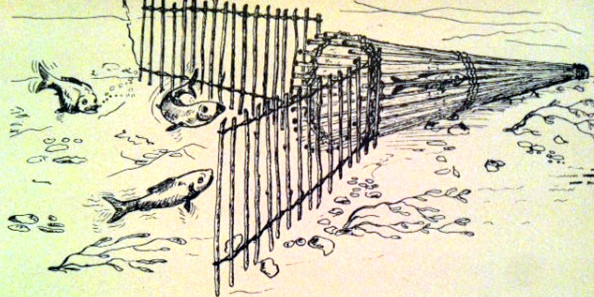
The llolle pictured is a traditional Mapuche fish trap.

Tools are known to have been relatively simple, most of them were made of wood, stone or — more rarely — of copper or bronze. Mapuche used a great variety of tools made of pierced stones. Volcanic scoria, a common rock in Southern Chile, was preferentially used to make tools, possibly because it is easy to shape. Mapuches used both individual digging sticks and large and heavy trident-like plows that required many men to use in agriculture. Another tool used in agriculture were maces used to destroy clods and flatten the soil.

The Mapuche canoes or wampos were made of hollow trunks. In the Chiloé Archipelago another type of watercraft was common: the dalca. Dalcas were made of planks and were mainly used for seafaring while wampus were used for navigating rivers and lakes. It is not known what kind of oars early Mapuches presumably used.

There are various reports in the 16th century of Mapuches using gold adornments. This tradition may be unrelated to Inca influence as the Mapuche word milla is unrelated those of the Andean languages. Gold was the most important metal in Pre-Hispanic Mapuche culture.

== Early Hispanic period (1535–1598) ==
=== Diego de Almagro Campaign (1535–1537) ===
The Spanish expansion into Chile was an offshoot of the conquest of Peru. Diego de Almagro amassed a large expedition of about 500 Spaniards and thousands of yanaconas and arrived at the Copiapó Valley in 1535 and at Aconcagua Valley in 1536. From there he sent Gómez de Alvarado south in charge of a scouting troop. Alvarado reached the Itata River where he engaged in the Battle of Reynogüelén with local Mapuches. Alvarado then returned north and Diego de Almagro's expedition returned to Peru due the ferocity of the Mapuches, and they had not found the riches they expected.

=== Michimalonco Resistance (1540–1544) ===
Another conquistador, Pedro de Valdivia, arrived in Chile from Cuzco in 1540. He conducted a nine-year campaign to secure central Chile. Recently arrived Pedro de Valdivia in central Chile is confronted by the toqui Michimalonco, who a couple of years before had expelled the Incas from Mapuche territory and dominated the northern lands controlled by the Mapuches. The Spanish and Mapuche hosts face each other in the Battle of Mapocho where Pedro de Valdivia is victorious. Michimalonco decides to make a tactical retreat to gather more contingent and expel the Spanish invaders with a surprise attack, but the Spanish find out about this accumulation of forces and decide to go where the Mapuche forces were accumulating for a surprise attack and the Battle of Chillox takes place where Michimalonco is defeated again.

The resounding victory leaves Pedro de Valdivia confident, and founded Santiago in 1541. After a few months of settlement, Pedro de Valdivia gathers forces and goes directly to attack the fortress of Michimalonco in Paidahuén, leading to the battle of Paidahuén where the Mapuches are completely defeated and Michimalonco is taken prisoner. To obtain its freedom, Michimalonco offers ownership of the Marga Marga gold pans, previously exploited by the Incas, but which since the expulsion of the Incas belonged to Michimalonco. With this, Michimalonco and his imprisoned men are released and Michimalonco allocates part of its vassals to the exploitation of the gold by the Spanish.

After a time of exploitation of the gold, Trangolonco, Michimalonco's brother, revolted and defeat the Spaniards in Marga Marga and destroyed the Spanish settlement, then defeat the Spanish in Concón and burned a ship under construction that was in the Bay, only a Spaniard and a slave escaped from the place. Trangolonco addresses as ambassador to all the loncos (Mapuche chiefs) of the Cachapoal, Maipo and Mapocho valleys to send their contingents and join Michimalonco, so that, just as he did with the Incas, he expels the Spanish from Araucanía. This action managed to gather around 16,000 warriors.

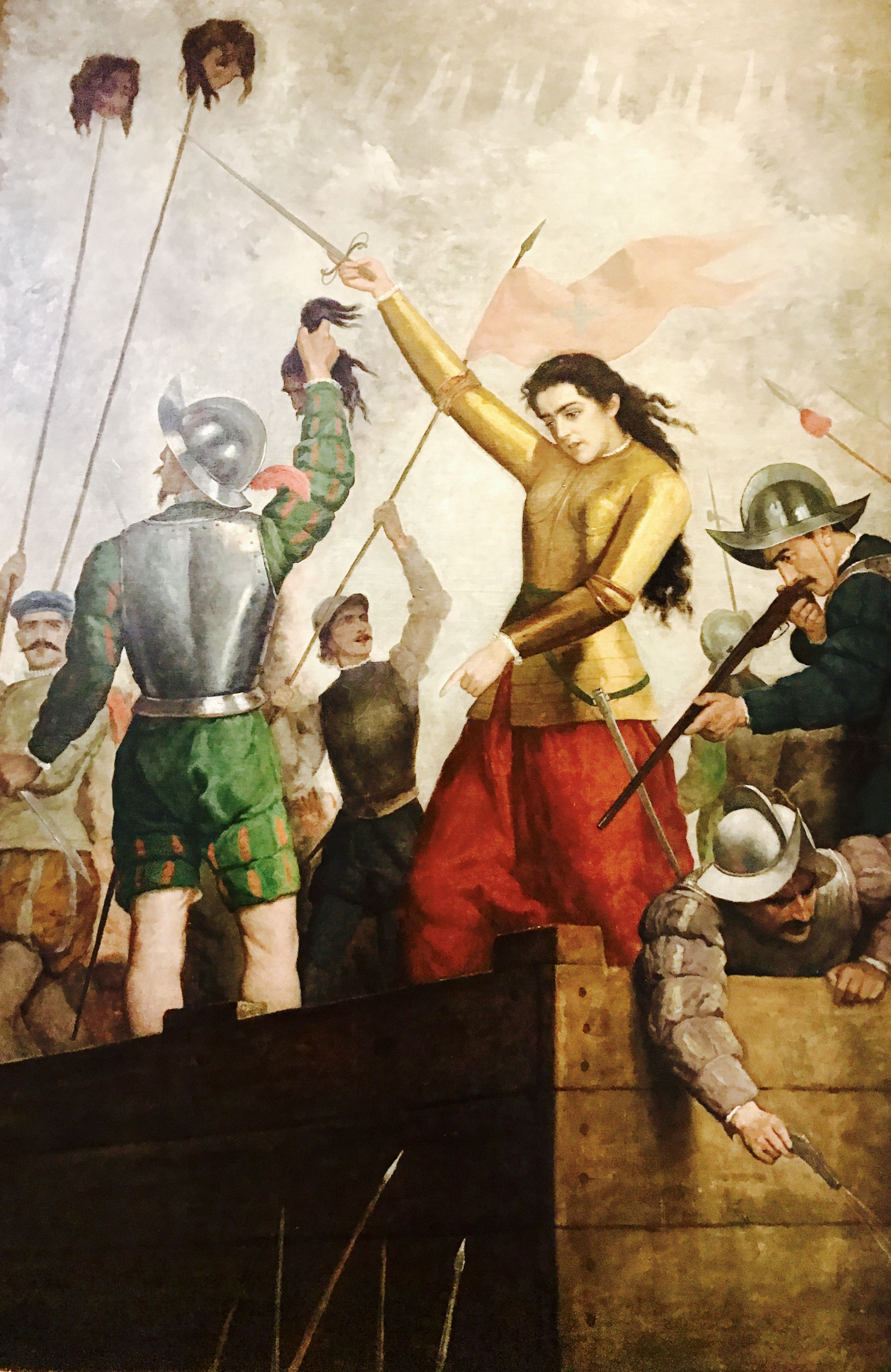
A painting of Inés de Suárez defending the city of Santiago

On September 11, 1541, Michimalonco attacked the Spanish and carried out the Destruction of Santiago, with only a handful of Spaniards barely surviving. Then Michimalonco applied the “empty war” which consisted of not giving the Spaniards any type of food or supplies so that they could go back to Peru. The Spanish barely resisted and there were a series of skirmishes between Spanish and Mapuche forces. According to chronicler Francisco de Riberos northern Mapuche put cultivation on hold for more than five years. 17th century Jesuit Diego de Rosales wrote that this was a coordinated strategy that was decided by a large assembly of many tribes. The Spanish found themselves in great distress as a result of a lack of supplies, but ultimately this strategy was unsuccessful in forcing Spanish conquerors out of Central Chile.

In 1544 Michimalonco headed to the Limarí River valley to cut off land communications between Chile and Peru for the Spanish. Michimalonco becomes strong in this sector with its Mapuche contingent added to the contingent of its Diaguita allies. Northern Mapuche groups appear to have responded to the Spanish conquest abandoning their best agricultural lands and moving to remote localities away from the Spanish. After some victories against the Spanish advances, Pedro de Valdivia was forced to command his army himself and go to sustain the battle of Limarí, where the Mapuche-Diaguita hosts were defeated and Pedro de Valdivia sent Juan Bohón to found the City of La Serena at the mouth of the Elqui River. In this context one of the reasons the Spanish had to establish the city of La Serena in 1544 was to control Mapuche groups that had begun to migrate north following the Spanish founding of Santiago. The Spanish understood this abandonment as an attempt to have them leave Chile much in the way Diego de Almagro did in his failed expedition of 1535–1537. The northern Mapuche, better known as Promaucaes or Picunches, unsuccessfully tried to resist the Spanish conquest.

=== Spanish expansion to the south (1544–1553) ===
In 1544, a naval expedition was sent, comprising the barks, San Pedro and Santiaguillo, under the command of Juan Bautista Pastene, to reconnoiter the southwestern coast of South America to the Strait of Magellan. The expedition set sail from Valparaíso, entered the bay of San Pedro, and made landings at what is now known as Concepción and at Valdivia, which was later named in honor of the commander. Encountering severe storms further south, he then returned to Valparaiso.

Valdivia himself set out in 1546, with sixty horsemen plus guides and porters, and crossed the Itata River and were attacked by Mapuche warriors in the Battle of Quilacura near the Bío-Bío River. Realizing that it would be impossible to proceed in such hostile territory with so limited a force, Valdivia elected to return to Santiago after finding a site for a new city at what is now Penco and that would become the first site of Concepción.

In 1550 Pedro de Valdivia, who aimed to control all of Chile to the Straits of Magellan, traveled southward to conquer more Mapuche territory. Between 1550 and 1553 the Spanish founded several cities (Note: These "cities" were often in fact more forts than cities.) in Mapuche lands including Concepción, Valdivia, Imperial, Villarrica and Angol. The Spanish also established the forts of Arauco, Purén and Tucapel. The key areas of conflict that the Spanish attempted to secure south of Bío Bío River were the valleys around Cordillera de Nahuelbuta. The Spanish designs for this region were to exploit the placer deposits of gold using unpaid Mapuche labour from the densely populated valleys.

Following these initial conquests the Arauco War, a long period of intermittent war between Mapuches and Spaniards, broke out. A contributing factor was the lack of a tradition of forced labour like the Andean mit'a among the Mapuches who largely refused to serve the Spanish. On the other hand, the Spanish, in particular those from Castile and Extremadura, came from an extremely violent society. Since the Spanish arrival in Araucanía in 1550, the Mapuches frequently laid siege to the Spanish cities in the 1550–1598 period. The war was mostly a low intensity conflict.

=== Campaigns of Caupolicán and Lautaro (1553–1557) ===
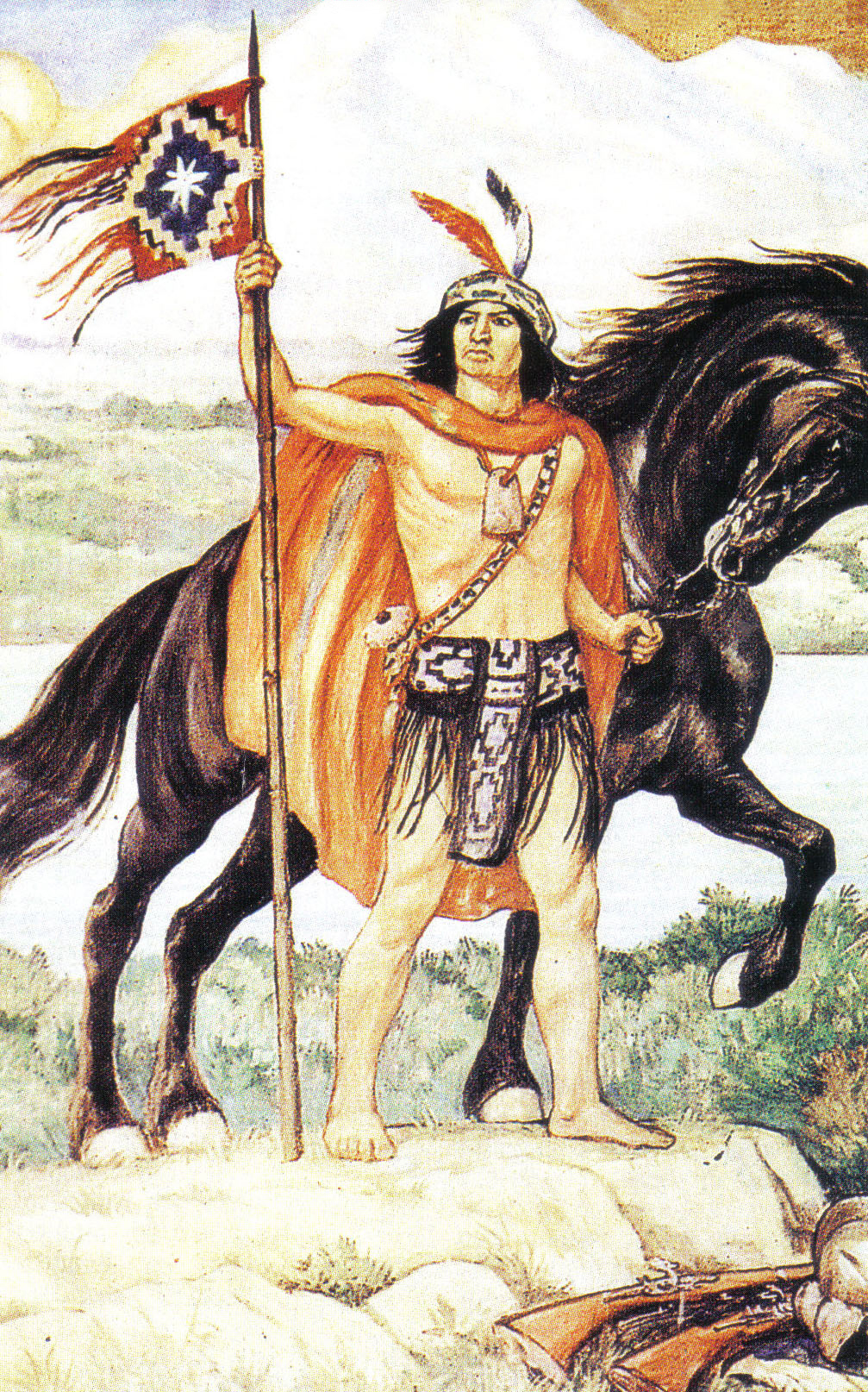
Toki Lautaro, an early Mapuche military leader. Painting by Pedro Subercaseaux.

In 1553, the Mapuches held a council at which they resolved to make war. They chose as their "toqui" (wartime chief) a strong man called Caupolicán and as his vice toqui Lautaro, because he had served as an auxiliary to the Spanish cavalry; he created the first Mapuche cavalry corps. With six thousand warriors under his command, Lautaro attacked the fort at Tucapel. The Spanish garrison was unable to withstand the assault and retreated to Purén. Lautaro seized and burned the fort and prepared his army certain that the Spaniards would attempt to retake Tucapel. Valdivia mounted a counter-attack, but he was quickly surrounded. He and his army was massacred by the Mapuches in the Battle of Tucapel.

In February 1554 Lautaro succeeded in putting together an army of 8,000 men, just in time to confront a punitive expedition under the command of Francisco de Villagra at the Battle of Marihueñu. Lautaro defeated Governor Villagra and later devastated the city of Concepción. In 1555 Lautaro went to the city of Angol and destroyed it, he also returned to Concepción, rebuilt by the Spanish and destroyed it again. The outbreak of a typhus plague, a drought and a famine prevented the Mapuches from taking further actions to expel the Spanish out of Chile in 1554 and 1555. Meanwhile, in the north during 1554, news of the victories of Lautauro led to uprisings by the previously subdued northern mapuche tribes in the valley of the Mataquito River and the valley of the Aconcagua River, but these were put down.

In 1556 his northward march reached the Mataquito River, where he established a fortified camp at Peteroa. In the Battle of Peteroa Lautaro repulsed attacking Spanish forces under the command of Diego Cano, and later held off the larger force commanded by Pedro de Villagra. Being advised that still more Spaniards were approaching, Lautaro decided to retreat towards the Maule River losing 200 warriors. With the Spaniards in hot pursuit he was forced to retire beyond the Itata River. In 1557 Lautaro headed with his army to destroy Santiago to liberate the whole of Central Chile from Spanish rule., fighting numerous battles with the Spanish along the way, but he and his army were devastated in the Battle of Mataquito.

=== Arauco War between 1558 and 1598 ===
The Spanish regrouped under the governorship of García Hurtado de Mendoza (1558–1561) and managed to kill Caupolicán and Galvarino, two key Mapuche leaders. In addition during the rule of García Hurtado de Mendoza the Spanish reestablished Concepción and Angol that had been destroyed by Mapuches and founded two new cities in Mapuche territory: Osorno and Cañete. In 1567 Spaniards conquered Chiloé Archipelago which was inhabited by Huilliches.

In the 1570s Pedro de Villagra massacred and subdued revolting Mapuches around the city of La Imperial. Warfare in Araucanía intensified in the 1590s. Over time the Mapuche's of Purén and to a lesser extent also Tucapel gained a reputation of fierceness among Mapuches and Spaniards alike. This allowed the Purén Mapuches to rally other Mapuches in the war with the Spanish.

=== Adaptations to the war ===
In the early battles with the Spaniards Mapuches had little success but with time the Mapuches of Arauco and Tucapel adapted by using horses and amassing the large quantities of troops necessary to defeat the Spanish. Mapuches learned from the Spanish to build forts in hills; they also began digging traps for Spanish horses, using helmets and wooden shields against arquebuses. Mapuche warfare evolved toward guerrilla tactics including the use of ambushes. The killing of Pedro de Valdivia in 1553 marked a rupture with the earlier ritual warfare tradition of the Mapuches. Mapuche organization changed in response to the war and the aillarehue, a new macro-scale political unit consisting of several rehue, appeared in the late 16th century. This scaling-up of political organization continued until the early 17th century when the butalmapu emerged, each of these units made up of several aillarehues. At a practical level this meant that the Mapuches achieved a "supra-local level of military solidarity" without having state organization. By the late 16th century a handful of powerful Mapuche warlords had emerged near La Frontera.

=== Changes in population patterns ===
The Mapuche population decreased following contact with the Spanish invaders. Epidemics decimated much of the population as did the war with the Spanish. Others died in the Spanish gold mines. From archaeological evidence it has been suggested that the Mapuche of Purén and Lumaco valley abandoned the very scattered population pattern to form denser villages as a response to the war with the Spanish. Declining population meant that as agriculture diminished, many open fields in southern Chile were overgrown with forest.

By the 1630s it was noted by the Spanish of La Serena that Mapuches (Picunches) from the Corregimiento of Santiago, likely from Aconcagua Valley, had migrated north settling in the Combarbalá and Cogotí. This migration appears to have been done freely without Spanish interference.

In the late 16th century the indigenous Picunche began a slow process of assimilation by losing their indigenous identity. This happened by a process of mestization by gradually abandoning their villages (pueblo de indios) to settle in nearby Spanish haciendas. There Picunches mingled with disparate indigenous peoples brought in from Peru, Tucumán, Araucanía (Mapuche), Chiloé (Huilliche, Cunco, Chono, Poyas) and Cuyo (Huarpe). Few in numbers, disconnected from their ancestral lands, living next to the Spanish and diluted by mestizaje, the Picunche and their descendants lost their indigenous identity.

== Independence and war (1598–1641) ==
=== Fall of the Spanish cities ===
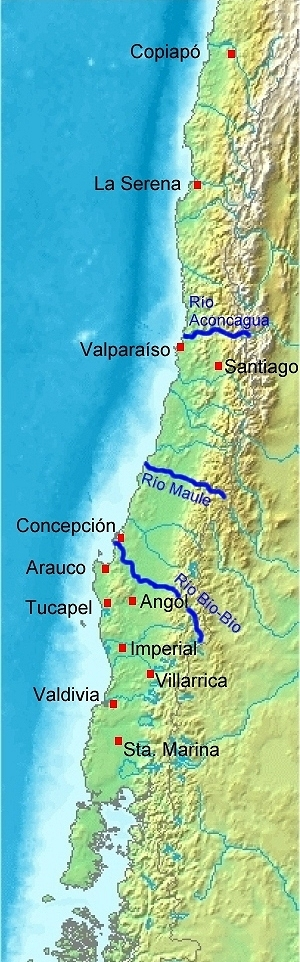
Settlements of the Conquistadores before the Destruction of the Seven Cities

A watershed event happened in 1598. That year a party of warriors from Purén were returning south from a raid against the surroundings of Chillán. On their way back home they ambushed Martín García Óñez de Loyola and his troops who were sleeping without any night watch. It is not clear if they found the Spanish by accident or if they had followed them. The warriors, led by Pelantaro, killed both the governor and all his troops.

In the years following the Battle of Curalaba a general uprising developed among the Mapuches and Huilliches. The Spanish cities of Angol, La Imperial, Osorno, Santa Cruz de Oñez, Valdivia and Villarrica were either destroyed or abandoned. Only Chillán and Concepción resisted the Mapuche sieges and attacks. With the exception of Chiloé Archipelago all the Chilean territory south of Bío Bío River became free of Spanish rule.

Chiloé did however also suffer Mapuche (Huilliche) attacks when in 1600 local Huilliche joined the Dutch corsair Baltazar de Cordes to attack the Spanish settlement of Castro. While this was a sporadic attack, the Spanish believed the Dutch could attempt to ally the Mapuches and establish a stronghold in southern Chile. As the Spanish confirmed their suspicions of Dutch plans to establish themselves at the ruins of Valdivia they attempted to re-establish Spanish rule there before the Dutch arrived again. The Spanish attempts were thwarted in the 1630s when Mapuches did not allow the Spanish to pass by their territory.

=== Captured Spanish women ===
With the fall of the Spanish cities thousands of Spanish were either killed or turned into captives. Contemporary chronicler Alonso González de Nájera writes that Mapuches killed more than three thousand Spanish and took over 500 women as captives. Many children and Spanish clergy were also captured. Skilled artisans, renegade Spanish, and women were generally spared by the Mapuches. In the case of the women it was, in the words of González de Nájera, "to take advantage of them" (Spanish: aprovecharse de ellas). While some Spanish women were recovered in Spanish raids, others were only set free in agreements following the Parliament of Quillín in 1641. Some Spanish women became accustomed to Mapuche life and stayed voluntarily. Women in captivity gave birth to a large number of mestizos who were rejected by the Spanish but accepted among the Mapuches. These women's children may have had a significant demographic impact on Mapuche society, long ravaged by war and epidemics. The capture of women during the Destruction of the Seven Cities initiated a tradition of abductions of Spanish women in the 17th century by Mapuches.

=== Adoption of Old World crops, animals and technologies ===
Overall the Mapuche of Araucanía appear to have been very selective in adopting Spanish technologies and species. This meant that the Mapuche way of living remained largely the same after Spanish contact. The scant adoption of Spanish technology has been characterized as a means of cultural resistance.

Mapuches of Araucanía were quick to adopt the horse and wheat cultivation from the Spanish. In Chiloé Archipelago wheat came to be grown in lesser quantities compared to the native potatoes, given the adverse climate. Instead, on these islands the introduction of pigs and apple trees by the Spanish proved a success. Pigs benefited from abundant shellfish and algae exposed by the large tides.

Until the arrival of the Spanish the Mapuches had had chilihueque (llama) livestock. The introduction of sheep caused some competition among both domestic species. Anecdotal evidence of the mid-17th century show that both species coexisted but that there were many more sheep than chilihueques. The decline of chilihueques reached a point in the late 18th century when only the Mapuche from Mariquina and Huequén next to Angol raised the animal.

Gold mining became a tabu among Mapuches in colonial times, and gold mining often prohibited under death penalty.

=== Jesuit activity ===
The first Jesuits arrived in Chile in 1593 and based themselves in Concepción to Christianize the Araucanía Mapuches. Jesuit Father Luis de Valdivia believed Mapuches could be voluntarily converted to Christianity only if there was peace. He arranged the abolition of Mapuche servitude and the start of the so-called Defensive War with Spanish authorities. Luis de Valdivia took away warlord Anganamón's wives as the Catholic church opposed polygamy. Anganamón retaliated, killing three Jesuit missionaries on December 14, 1612. This incident did not stop the Jesuits' Christianization attempts and Jesuits continued their activity until their expulsion from Chile in 1767. Activity was centered around Spanish cities from which missionary excursions departed. No permanent mission was established in free Mapuche lands during the 17th or 18th century. To convert the Mapuches Jesuits studied and learned their language and customs. Contrasting with their high political impact in the 1610s and 1620s, the Jesuits had little success in their conversion attempts.

=== Slavery of Mapuches ===
Formal slavery of indigenous people was prohibited by the Spanish Crown. The 1598–1604 Mapuche uprising that ended with the Destruction of the Seven Cities made the Spanish in 1608 declare slavery legal for those Mapuches caught in war. Rebelling Mapuches were considered Christian apostates and could therefore be enslaved according to the church teachings of the day. This legal change formalized Mapuche slavery that was already occurring at the time, with captured Mapuches being treated as property in the way they were bought and sold among the Spanish. Legalisation made Spanish slave raiding increasingly common in the Arauco War. Mapuche slaves were exported north to La Serena and Lima. Slavery for Mapuches "caught in war" was abolished in 1683 after decades of legal attempts by the Spanish Crown to suppress it. By that time free mestizo labour had become significantly cheaper than ownership of slaves, which made Mario Góngora conclude in 1966 that economic factors were behind the abolition.

== Age of Parliaments (1641–1810) ==
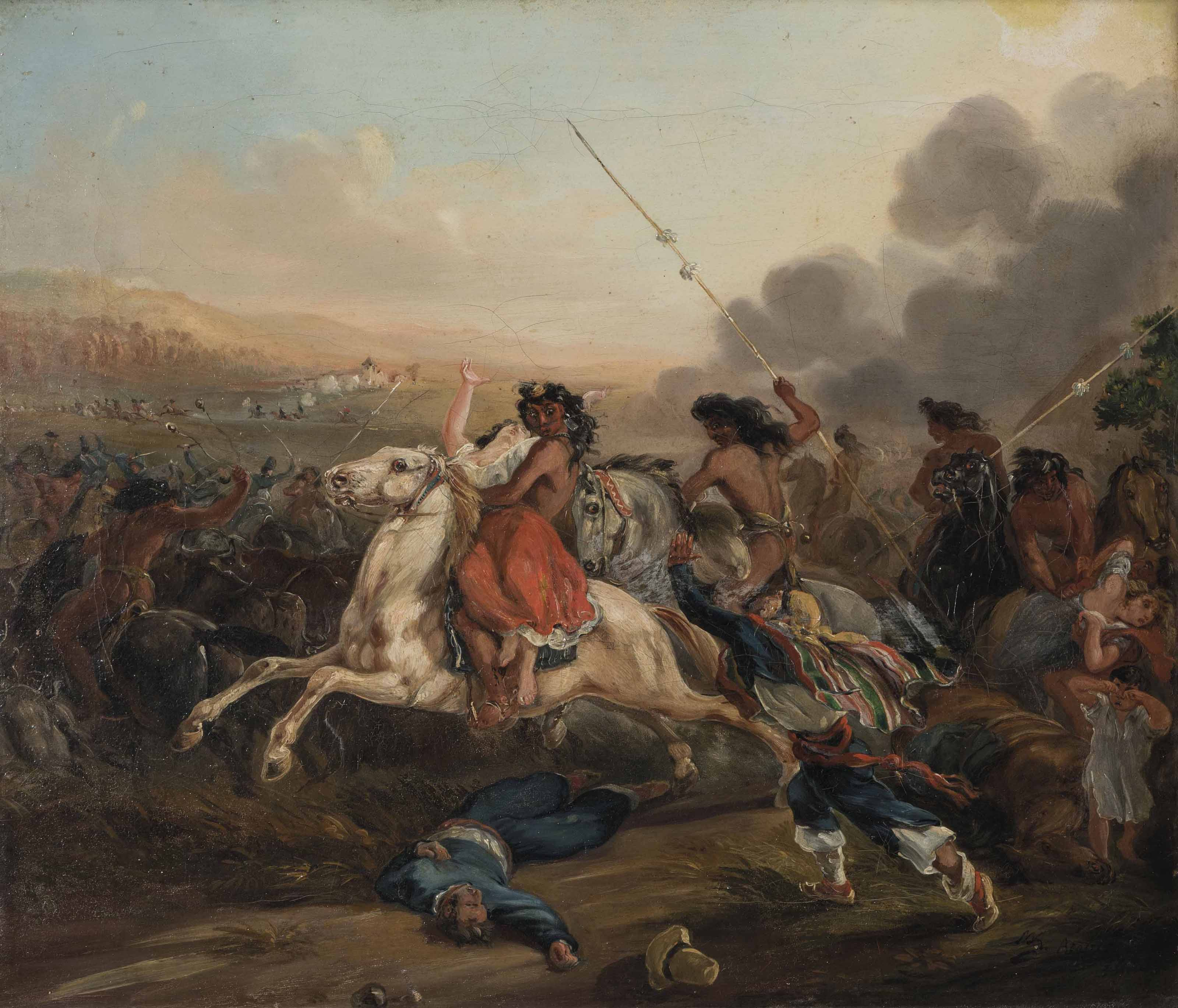
Mapuches during a malón raid

== Republican period (1810–1990) ==
=== Role in Chilean Independence War (1810–1821) ===
Guerre La Muerte and Political Turmoil (1818–1832): After the defeat of the Spanish in Chile and Argentina by Bernardo O'Higgins and San Martin's united forces, both armies had a new target that rose from the south and joined with Spanish royalists. This war became known as Guerra a Muerte (War to the Death). After defeating the Spanish in central Chile, O'Higgins and San Martin followed the Spanish to southern Chile into Mapuche lands. After O'Higgins signed the provisional Constitution of 1818, and became the Supreme Magistrate of the Chilean people, he offered to the Mapuche a pact of friendship between each other, saying "Our brothers, the inhabitants of the southern frontier". He considered the Mapuches as relatives of the Chileans, saying, "We all descend from the same Fathers, and the natural resources of our territory, our customs, and our respective needs, induce us to live in everlasting harmony and fraternity."

The Mapuche had multiple groups in the area: the Costinos (Pacific Coast Mapuches), llanistas (Central Plain Mapuches), Abajinos and Pehuenche (transandean Piedmont of Chile and Argentina Mapuches), and Huilliche (Valdivian Mapuches). These groups refused to abandon their territories, which they had guarded for centuries prior to the Spanish colonies, and this caused friction with the Chilean officials. However, this was not the first time the Mapuches stood up to an outside force, as in the 16th century, they were the reason that the Spanish were not able to expand further south.

Yet, Mapuche politics became complicated as the Mapuche caciques had internal rivalries that predated the war itself and violently emerged when the Chilean Patriots and Spanish Royalists began to fight each other in their land. Because of their fragmented state, due to a small group of lonkos (another name for leader or cacique) gaining more and more territory, led to other the caciques chose sides in the Chilean War of Independence.

A large majority of the Mapuche people aligned with the Spanish royalists, such as Francisco Mariluán, who was pro-Spanish, mainly because they would not break their previous oaths to the Spanish, in which they would provide military aid, provide gifts, or host parlementos in front of forts. These treaties between the Spanish and the Mapuche, date back to the 16th century, when the Mapuche, the Pehuenche, and the Huilliche tribes defeated the Spanish conquest. By the 18th century, the Spanish and the Mapuches began commercial relations, which were agreed upon by the Spanish and Mapuche leaders.

The Spanish and Mapuche would trade merchandise and resources between each other. Over time politically and socially in which the Spaniards paid the chieftains to watch over and protect the merchants who were moving through the area. Ladinos (Native and Spanish mixed), and some chiefs who also helped relations with the two groups and later on the Spaniards gave 14 chieftains, including female chiefs, stipend from fiscal resources. The peace treaties that were signed, allowed for the Mapuche tribes to have their own lands, separate from Spanish colonialism.

Nevertheless, the Mapuche men gained great wealth within their lofs (extended family residences) by raiding Spanish settlers and other indigenous groups on both sides of the Andes mountains. When the Chilean Patriots and the Royalists began fighting in Mapuche lands, the caciques had to navigate pressures and commitments that were placed on them by the Spanish, the Chilean Patriots, their own followers, and their families. The few who sided with the Chileans were led by Benjamin Vicuna Mackenna and Venancio Conuepan, who were fighting using Guerrilla warfare against the Royalists in Mapuche territory.

In 1818, after the Battle of Maipu on April 5, the Spanish forces would disbanded into smaller groups within Mapuche territories. They would become guerrilla fighters, and many royalists would gain fame from their actions, such as the notorious Pincheira Brothers. The Pincheira Brothers were a group of around 1,000 royalists and royalist Mapuche who were led by 4 brothers named Pablo, Santos, José Antonio and Antonio who fought in the Battle of Maipu. These men would pillaged Chilean villages and towns, taking anything they found useful to them, including women. Chile viewed them as traitors and criminals who undermined Chile's newly formed state and, over time, they became legends of Chile's Wild West.

This kind of fighting continued for two years straight as both sides raided and pillaged each other. Francisco Mariluán also participated in some of the attacks on Chilean forces. He later joined his Spanish allies and headed toward the Llanos fort of Tucapel, which lead to his rival, Venancio Conuepan, following suite and attacking areas along the Biobío River. After two years of constant conflict, Conuepan and his Chilean allies sought to end the endless war, so he attempted a march into the heart of Mariluán's territory in Araucanía in order to confront him.

This strategy failed, and after multiple events in 1822 and 1823, the war continued until January 7, 1825, when Mariluan signed the peace treaty of Tapihue with Chilean military officer Pedro Barnechea. To conclude the treaty, they commenced a ceremony to demonstrate their unity. The Chileans unfolded a Chilean flag, fired 10 volleys, and repeated the phrase "Long live unity!" After this, they proceeded with the Mapuche's war custom wherein the Chileans broke their swords as well as four Mapuche spears, a symbolizing the end of hostilities between the two groups.

Two years prior to the conclusion of the wars between the Mapuche and the Chileans, Supreme Director Bernardo O'Higgins attempted to transform the Chilean government into an authoritarian state in which the executive branch of government had more power than the House of Representatives and the Senate.

However, due to his push for the executive to have more of the Senate's power, the political elite had enough and exiled him in 1823. Over time, both the Liberal Party and the Conservative party of Chile would be at each other's throats until the 1829 Chilean Civil War began. All the while, The Pincheira Brothers continued their rampage across Chile, lasting a total of 12 years until 1832 when the last living Pincheira brother, José Antonio, along with his Pehuenche allies, were granted pardons.

Mariluán would aid the Chilean military in stopping the banditry that was running wild throughout the area while also keeping his end of the treaty by providing soldiers and turning in all Chilean deserters and Spanish prisoners over to the Chilean government. In return his people received public education and the rebuilding of the Southern frontier forts located in his territory. He was also tasked with maintaining treaty in effect with all his neighbors and dependents as well.

=== Coexistence with the Republic of Chile (1821–1861) ===
Mapuche lands south of Bío-Bío River began to be bought by non-Mapuches in the late 18th century, and by 1860 land between Bío-Bío and Malleco River was mostly under the control of Chileans. The Chilean wheat boom increased the pressure to acquire lands in Araucanía by Chileans and lead to numerous scams and fraud against Mapuches. A limited number of speculators obtained control over vast lands through fraud and maintained control over their assets with the help of gunmen.

The encroachment of settlers that had advanced over time from the north across Bío Bío River into Mapuche territory and the appearance of German settlers in southern Mapuche territory led chief Mañil in 1859 to call for an uprising to assert control over the territory. Most Mapuches responded to the call, except the communities at Purén, Choll Choll, and the southern coastal Mapuches who had strong links with Valdivia. The towns of Angol, Negrete and Nacimiento were attacked. A peace proposal made by settlers was accepted in 1860 during a meeting of several Mapuche chiefs. In the agreement it was established that land transfers could only be made with the approval of the chiefs.

=== End of Mapuche independence (1861–1883) ===
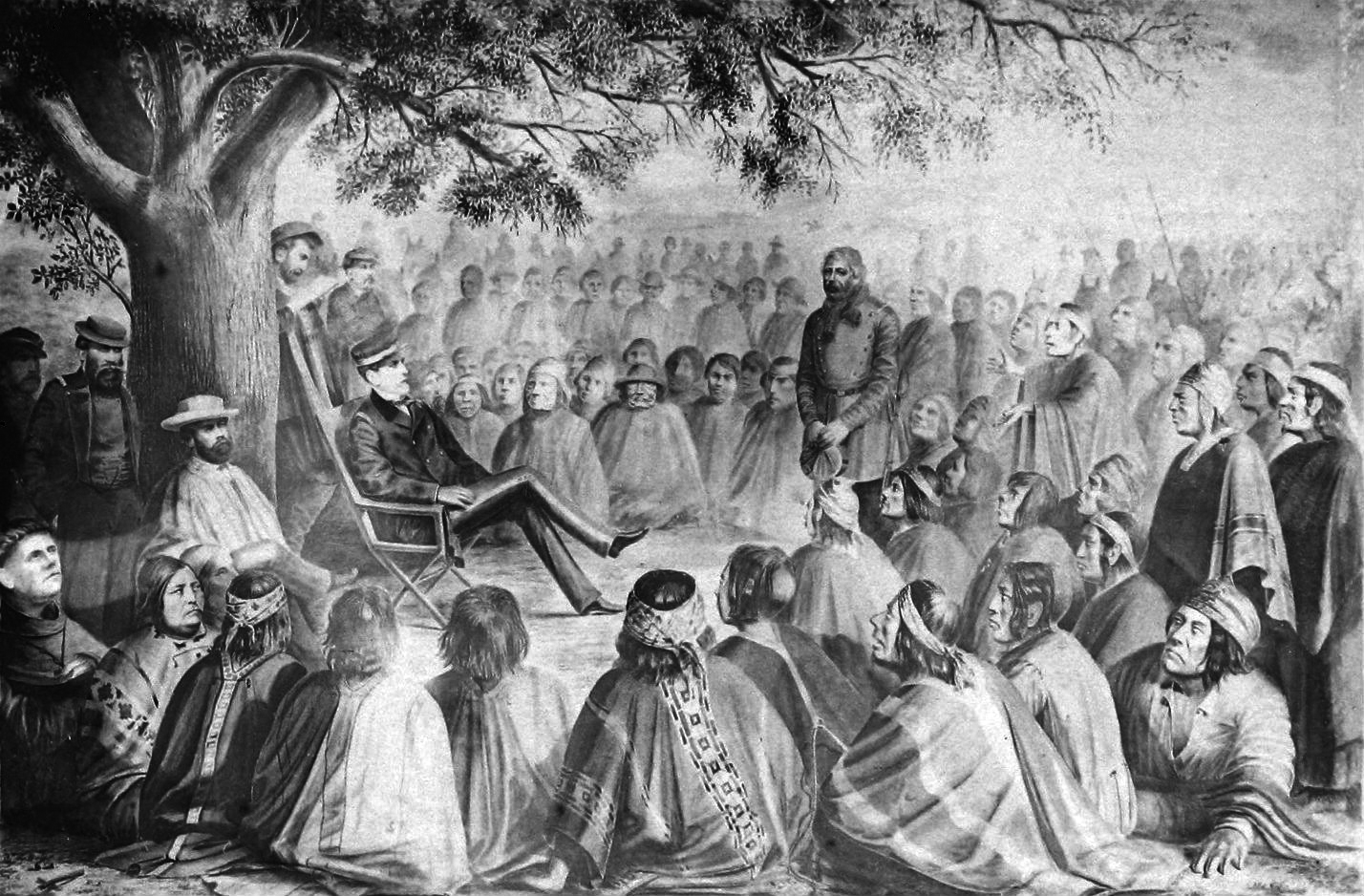
Cornelio Saavedra Rodríguez in meeting with the main lonkos of Araucania in 1869

Vintage engraving of Mapuche

In the 19th century Chile experienced a fast territorial expansion. Chile established a colony at the Strait of Magellan in 1843, settled Valdivia, Osorno and Llanquihue with German immigrants and conquered land from Peru and Bolivia. Later Chile would also annex Easter Island. In this context Araucanía began to be conquered by Chile due to two reasons. First, the Chilean state aimed for territorial continuity and second, it remained the sole place for Chilean agriculture to expand.

Between 1861 and 1871 Chile incorporated several Mapuche territories in Araucanía. In January 1881, having decisively defeated Peru in the battles of Chorrillos and Miraflores, Chile resumed the conquest of Araucanía.

The campaigns of the Argentine Army against Mapuches in the other side of the Andes pushed in 1880 many Mapuches into Araucanía. Pehuenche chief Purrán was taken prisoner by the Argentine Army; the Argentine Army penetrated the valley of Lonquimay, which Chile considered part of its legal territory. The fast Argentine advance alarmed Chilean authorities and contributed to the Chilean-Mapuche confrontations of 1881.

On January 1 of 1883 Chile refounded the old city of Villarrica ending thus formally the process of occupation of Araucanía.

=== From dispossession to vindication (1883–1990) ===
Historian Ward Churchill has claimed that the Mapuche population dropped from a total of half a million to 25,000 within a generation as result of the occupation. The conquest of Araucanía caused numerous Mapuches to be displaced and forced to roam in search of shelter and food. Some Chilean forts responded by providing food rations. Until around 1900 the Chilean state provided almost 10,000 food rations monthly to displaced Mapuches. Mapuche poverty was a common theme in many Chilean Army memoirs from the 1880s to around 1900. Scholar Pablo Miramán states that the introduction of state education during the Occupation of Araucanía had detrimental effects on traditional Mapuche education.

In the years following the occupation the economy of Araucanía changed from being based on sheep and cattle herding to one based on agriculture and wood extraction. The loss of land by the Mapuches following the occupation caused severe erosion since they continued to practice significant livestock herding in limited areas.

== Recent history (1990–present) ==
Many ethnic Mapuche now live across southern Chile and Argentina; some maintain their traditions and continue living from agriculture, but a majority have migrated to cities in search of better economic opportunities. Many are concentrated around Santiago. Chile's Araucanía Region, the former Araucanía, has a rural population that is 80% Mapuche; substantial Mapuche populations occupy areas of the regions of Los Lagos, Bío-Bío, and Maule.

In the 2002 Chilean census 604,349 people identified as Mapuche, and of these the two regions with the largest numbers were Araucanía with 203,221, and Santiago Metropolitan Region with 182,963. Each major population is greater than the total Mapuche population in Argentina as of 2004–2005.

In recent years, the Chilean government has tried to redress some of the inequities of the past. In 1993 the Parliament passed Law n° 19 253 (Indigenous Law, or Ley indígena), which officially recognized the Mapuche people and seven other ethnic minorities as well as the Mapudungun language and culture. Mapundungun, whose use was prohibited before, is now included in the curriculum of elementary schools around Temuco.

Despite representing 4.6% of the Chilean population, few Mapuche have reached government positions. In 2006 among Chile's 38 senators and 120 deputies, only one identified as indigenous. The number of indigenous politicians in electoral office is higher at municipal levels.

Representatives from Mapuche organizations have joined the Unrepresented Nations and Peoples Organization (UNPO), seeking recognition and protection for their cultural and land rights.

=== Modern conflict ===
Land disputes and violent confrontations continue in some Mapuche areas, particularly in the northern sections of the Araucanía region between and around Traiguén and Lumaco. In an effort to defuse tensions, the Commission for Historical Truth and New Treatments issued a report in 2003 calling for drastic changes in Chile's treatment of its indigenous people, more than 80 percent of whom are Mapuche. The recommendations included the formal recognition of political and "territorial" rights for indigenous peoples, as well as efforts to promote their cultural identities. Though Japanese and Swiss interests are active in the economy of Araucanía (Mapudungun: Ngulu Mapu), the two chief forestry companies are Chilean-owned. In the past, the firms have planted hundreds of thousands of acres with non-native species such as Monterey pine, Douglas firs and eucalyptus trees, sometimes replacing native Valdivian forests, although such substitution and replacement is now forbidden.

Chile exports wood to the United States, almost all of which comes from this southern region, with an annual value of $600 million and rising. Forest Ethics (now Stand.earth), a conservation group, has led an international campaign for preservation, resulting in the Home Depot chain and other leading wood importers agreeing to revise their purchasing policies to "provide for the protection of native forests in Chile." Some Mapuche leaders want stronger protections for the forests.

In recent years, the delicts committed by Mapuche activists have been prosecuted under counter-terrorism legislation, originally introduced by the military dictatorship of Augusto Pinochet to control political dissidents. The law allows prosecutors to withhold evidence from the defense for up to six months and to conceal the identity of witnesses, who may give evidence in court behind screens. Violent activist groups, such as the Coordinadora Arauco Malleco, use tactics such as the burning of structures and pastures and death threats against people and their families. Protesters from Mapuche communities have used these tactics against properties of both multinational forestry corporations and private individuals. In 2010 the Mapuche launched a number of hunger strikes in attempts to effect change in the anti-terrorism legislation.

== Bibliography ==
- Bengoa, José (2000). Historia del pueblo mapuche: Siglos XIX y XX (in Spanish) (Seventh ed.). LOM Ediciones. ISBN 978-956-282-232-9.
- Bengoa, José (2003). Historia de los antiguos mapuches del sur (in Spanish). Santiago: Catalonia. ISBN 978-956-8303-02-0.
- Clark Berger, Eugene (2006). Permanent war on Peru's periphery: Frontier identity and the politics of conflict in 17th century Chile (PDF) (Ph.D.). Vanderbilt University.
- Dillehay, Tom (2007). Monuments, empires, and resistance: The Araucanian polity and ritual narratives. Cambridge University Press. ISBN 978-110-7407-74-9.
- Ferrando Kaun, Ricardo (1986). Y así nació La Frontera... (in Spanish) (Second ed.). Editorial Antártica. ISBN 978-956-7019-83-0.
- Foerster, Rolf (1993). Introducción a la religiosidad mapuche (PDF) (in Spanish). Editorial Universitaria. ISBN 956-1 1-0912-3.
- Hanisch, Walter (1982). La Isla de Chiloe, Capitana de Rutas Australes (in Spanish). Academia Superior de Ciencias Pedagógicas de Santiago.
- León, Leonardo (1991). La merma de la sociadad indígena en Chile central y la última guerra de los promaucaes (PDF) (in Spanish). Institute of Ameriendian Studies, University of St. Andrews. ISBN 1873617003.
- Otero, Luis (2006). La huella del fuego: Historia de los bosques nativos. Poblamiento y cambios en el paisaje del sur de Chile (in Spanish). Pehuén Editores. ISBN 978-956-16-0409-4.
- Pinto Rodríguez, Jorge (2003). La formación del Estado y la nacion, y el pueblo mapuche (in Spanish) (Second ed.). Ediciones de la Dirección de Bibliotecas, Archivos y Museos. ISBN 978-956-244-156-8.
- Téllez, Eduardo (2008). Los Diaguitas: Estudios (in Spanish). Santiago, Chile: Ediciones Akhilleus. ISBN 978-956-8762-00-1.
- Valenzuela Márquez, Jaime (2009). "Esclavos mapuches. Para una historia del secuestro y deportación de indígenas en la colonia". In Gaune, Rafael; Lara, Martín (eds.). Historias de racismo y discriminación en Chile (in Spanish).
- Villalobos, Sergio; Silva, Osvaldo; Silva, Fernando; Estelle, Patricio (1974). Historia de Chile (in Spanish) (14th ed.). Santiago de Chile: Editorial Universitaria. ISBN 978-956-11-1163-9.
