= Prehispanic history of Chile =

The precolonial history of Chile refers to the period from the arrival of the first human populations in the territory of Chile until the first European exploration of the region, by Spaniard Diego de Almagro in 1535–36.

== Overview ==
Distribution of the pre-hispanic peoples of Chile

Research suggests that the first populations arrived in the country around 35,000 BC, during the Pleistocene period for the prehistoric site at "Monte Verde I" and around 15,000 years BC for the site at "Monte Verde II" (the end of the Pleistocene and start of the Holocene (close to the end of the Upper Paleolithic). Prehispanic Chile was peopled by diverse Amerindian people who were located around the Andes and the coast. In the area to the north of the country, the Aymara and the Atacama began to cultivate land from the 11th century in the style of the Incas (growing plants on terraces on the sides of mountains with canal systems). By the 15th century, the Incas had taken possession of the territory of modern-day Chile up to the Maule River. At the south of the Aconcagua, the semi-nomadic communities such as the Mapuche were set up. In the austral zone of the country, various Amerindian people such as the Chomos, Tamanas, Alacalufes and Onas were living. In the Easter Islands a Polynesian culture developed, which continues today.

On the Pacific coast, different cultures and peoples coexisted: the Aymara, Chango, Chinchorro, Atacama, Diaguita in the north: the Picunche, Mapuche, Huilliche, Chono in the Central and Southern region; and the Selkʼnam, Yaghan and Alakaluf in Patagonia and Tierra del Fuego. The Mapuche formed an extensive community.

== Monte Verde ==
The prehistoric site of Monte Verde in Chile, presently under consideration as a World Heritage Site by UNESCO, has provided the oldest dates of habitations in Chile at around 13,000 to 15,000 years for "Monte Verde II". Dates of 33,000 to 35,000 years have been suggested for the "Monte Verde I" site but the evidence is considered too meagre to verify that.

== The Chinchorro ==
The Chinchorro culture of South America goes back to 9,000 years ago. The Chinchorro were sedentary fishing people of northern Chile and southern Peru. They inhabited the arid coastal regions of the Atacama Desert from Ilo, southern Peru, to Antofagasta in northern Chile. Outcrops of fresh water on the coast facilitated human settlement in this region. The Chinchorro are famous for their detailed mummification practice (Chinchorro mummies). The culture lasted for several thousand years, evolving and adapting over the period.

The Chinchorro were expert fishermen. They developed an extensive and sophisticated fishing tool assemblage. They had efficient fishing gear, such as fishing hooks made of shells and cacti, and stone weights for nets made of mesh fabrics. They became skilled weavers of baskets and mats.

The Chinchorro type site is located in Arica, Chile; it was discovered by Max Uhle in the early 20th century.

Their mummies which were much more ancient than those of the ancient Egyptians. Some of their DNA was recovered.

== See also ==
- Origin of the Mapuche
- Mapuche history
- Incas in Central Chile
- Las Ánimas complex
- El Molle culture
- Diaguita
- Pre-Columbian transoceanic contact theories
