= Las Ánimas complex =

Archaeological culture in Chile

Las Ánimas complex is an archaeological culture of northern Chile considered to be the immediate precursor to the Diaguita culture. The culture developed in the Chilean region of Norte Chico between 800 and 1000 CE. Prior to Las Ánimas complex, an archaeological culture known as El Molle complex existed in Norte Chico from 300 to 700 CE.

== Archaeological findings ==
Pottery recovered from Las Ánimas complex has linear designs painted with white, red or black. The black colour derives from specular hematite.

Las Ánimas complex has the earliest evidence for copper metallurgy in Norte Chico.

== Regional geology ==
A 2014 paleomagnetic and geochronologic study on the Sierra de las Ánimas geological complex found that the complex was erupted around 578 Ma and did not extend into the Cambrian.

== See also ==
- Chango
- Incas in Central Chile
- Mapuche history
- Tiwanaku
