= Chicoana people =

Group of Diaguita people

The Chicoana are a Diaguita tribe in the Salta Province, Argentina.
