= El Molle culture =

Archaeological culture found in Chile

El Molle culture was a South American archaeological culture from in the Transverse Valleys of Norte Chico, Chile, known chiefly for its ceramics. The culture existed from 300 to 700 CE and was later replaced in Chile by Las Ánimas culture that developed between 800 and 1000 CE. This last culture then gave way to the historical Diaguita culture encountered by the Spanish in the 16th century. (Note: For a while a historical and an archaeological Diaguita culture were distinguished. To this last one, the cemetery site Las Ánimas was said to belong.) El Molle culture coexisted for a significant time with La Animas culture. It is possible that Las Ánimas culture learned copper metallurgy from El Molle.

In 1954 Grete Mostny postulated the idea of a link between Mapuches of south-central Chile and the El Molle culture. The Mapuche Pitrén ceramics slightly postdate the ceramics of El Molle with which it shares various commalities. Various archaeologists including Grete Mostny are of the idea that El Molle culture is in turn related to cultures of the Argentine Northwest, chiefly Candelaria, which are in turn suggested to be related to more northern "tropical jungle" cultures. Tembetás, lower lip piercings usually associated with indigenous cultures of Brazil, findings have been reported in Central Chile with some scholars differing if these elements the result of migrations or non-migratory contacts with the Argentine Northwest.

== See also ==
- Chango people
- Chinchorro mummies
- Origin of the Mapuche
- Tiwanaku

== Bibliography ==
- Mostny, Grete (1983) [1981]. Prehistoria de Chile (in Spanish) (6th ed.). Santiago de Chile: Editorial Universitaria.
