= Humberto Fuenzalida =

Chilean paleontologist (1904–1966)

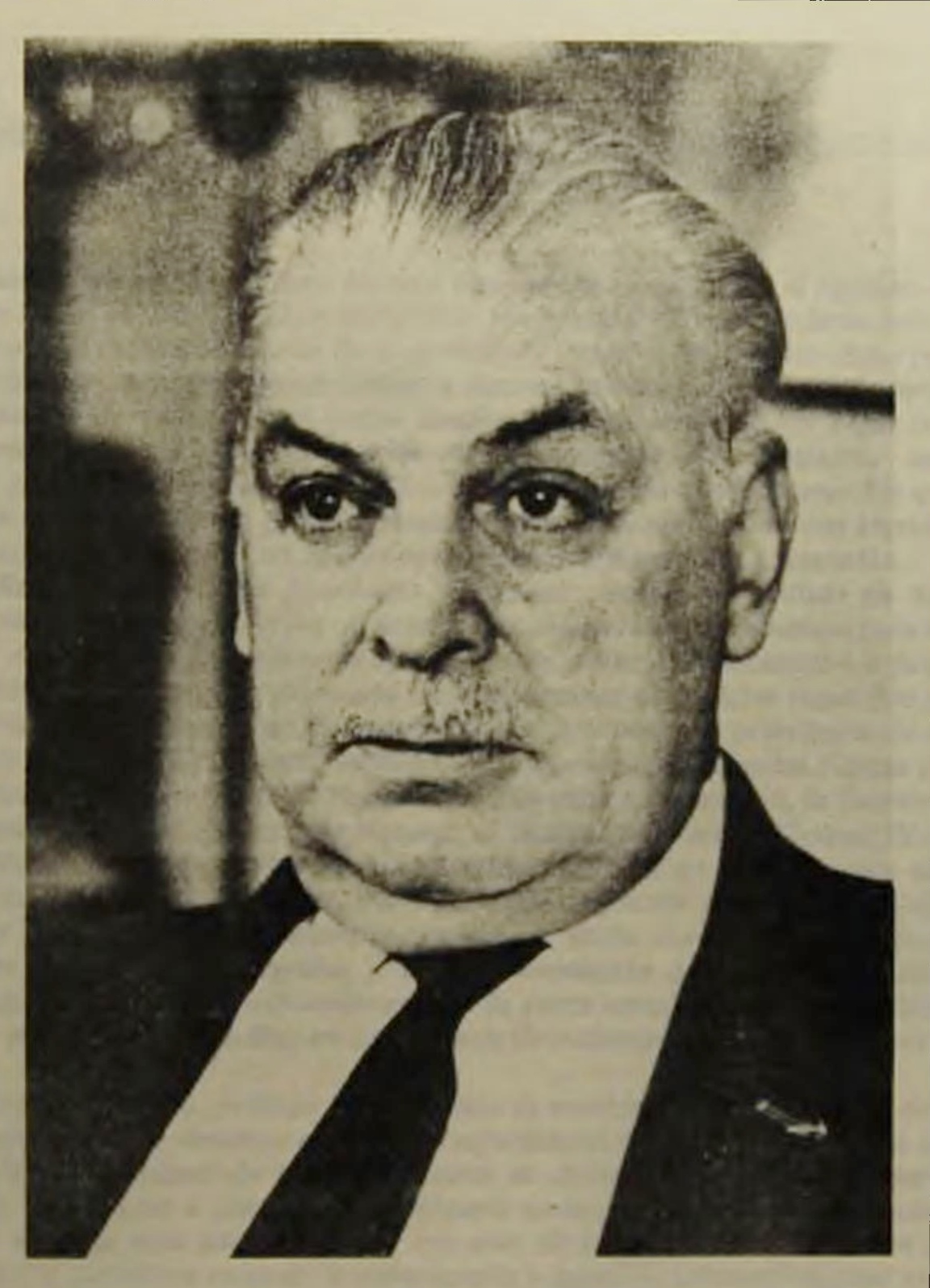
- Born: 27 March 1904; Curicó, Chile
- Died: 24 February 1966 (aged 61); Chile
- Education: University of Chile
- Scientific career
- Fields: Climatology; Geology; Physical geography Paleontology

Humberto Fuenzalida Villegas (1904–1966) was a Chilean geologist, paleontologist and geographer. Fuenzalida headed in turn the geography and geology departments of the University of Chile, being also founder of Sociedad Geológica de Chile, a professional society grouping Chile's geologists. In 1938 he took charge of the geological and paleontological collection of Chilean National Museum of Natural History by request of Ricardo E. Latcham. In 1948 he became director of the museum holding that post until 1964 when he was succeeded by Grete Mostny. Fuenzalida championed the establishment of a geology degree in the University of Chile, leading a successful effort in 1961.

In the 1926–1930 period Fuenzalida studied in Sorbonne, Paris, with teachers such as Emmanuel de Martonne, Émile Haug and León Lyteaud. He died in 1966 after a long period of illness.

== Career as a scientist ==
The work of Fuenzalida spanned the whole Chilean territory, studying the geology around the Puelo River, the volcanoes of Maule Region (Quizapu, Descabezado Grande, and Descabezado Chico), the Arauco Basin, the Magallanes Basin, and the South Shetland Islands in Chilean Antarctica.

In addition, he did some confidential work for ENAP and work on the borders between the Atlantic and Pacific oceans for the Ministry of Foreign Affairs at a time the Beagle conflict was latent.

Subjects he dealt with include sea-level change, the Andean orogeny (within a Geosynclinal theory framework), volcanism in Chile and Antarctica, sand dunes, economic geography, and reflections on figures such as Juan Ignacio Molina, Claudio Gay, Diego Barros Arana and Ricardo E. Latcham.

Physical geography and climatology were Fuenzalida's research interests of choice.
