= Maqui Orellana =

Chilean history teacher and kickboxing champion

Macarena Orellana
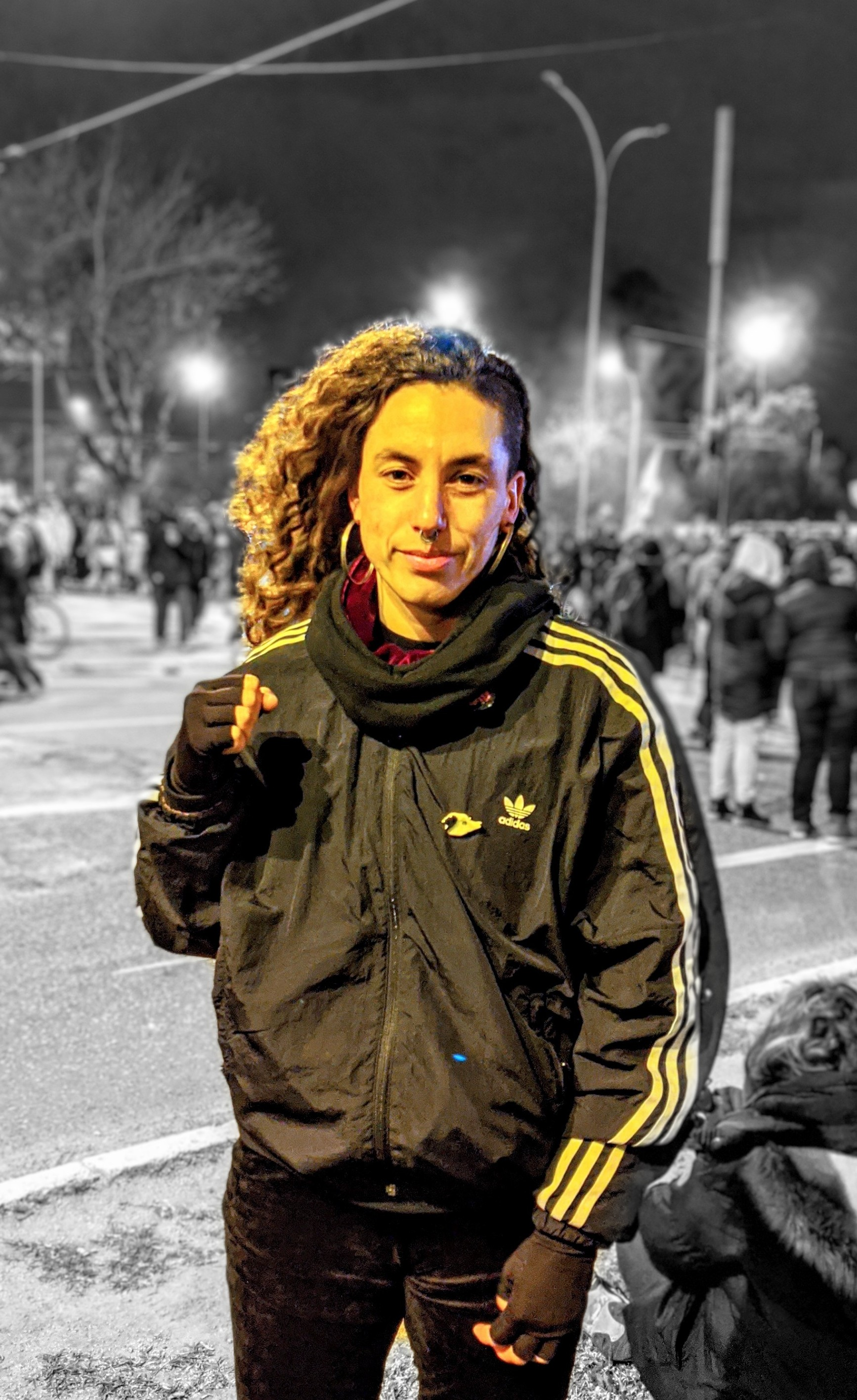
- Born: Macul, Chile
- Occupations: Kickboxer and history professor
- Known for: Kick Boxing

Maqui Orellana Caperochipi Is a Chilean history teacher and kickboxer. In October 2021, they won the silver medal at the Kickboxing World Cup in Egypt. They are nicknamed the "Maquinita".

== Biography ==
Orellana was born and raised in the Arellano neighborhood in Macul. They have a Master's degree in Latin American History. They taught history at Silva Henríquez University and in high schools and was an assistant professor of the Department of History of the Universidad of Chile.

They started kickboxing when they were looking to do a sport to feel safer in her daily life and in the public space, for being, at this time, a woman and a lesbian, after the murders of Nicole Saavedra and of Daniel Zamudio. They train with Iván Galaz. Additionally, they tried other contact sports such as MMA, Boxing and BJJ. Sebastián Corral gave them the nickname the "Maquinita". Their motto is "Fight as a Woman".

They offer kickboxing workshops for young people and are a sports manager. In addition, since 2017 they organize women's kickboxing championships "Fight as a Woman", which bring together athletes of all levels.

They denounced the lack of economic support for sport in Chile, in particular to be able to represent Chile in international tournaments. Despite having qualified three times for the world championship, they could not attend in 2017 and 2019 due to lack of money. In August 2021, while Orellana was campaigning to raise funds to participate in the World Cup in Egypt, they received a proposal for help from businessman Andrónico Luksic, which they rejected. Orellana explained that they did not want to be used for an image wash and criticized Luksic and his companies, also ensuring that they prefer to receive money "from honest people, who believe in my work, in my activism, in my sports and teaching life." In October 2021, they won the silver medal at the Kickboxing World Cup in Egypt.

In 2016, Orellana reported, along with the student Dina Camacho, having been sexually harassed by Leonardo León, former director of the History career.

Orellana is non-binary and uses the Spanish pronoun elle.

Orellana is a fan of the football club Colo-Colo.

== Sports achievements ==
Orellana was invited to several national and international tournaments, although due to lack of resources they could not attend the WAKO Kickboxing World Championship in Hungary in 2017. They achieved the following achievements:

- 2016:
  - National kickboxing champion WAKO in the category -56 kilos Low Kick
  - Gold medal in the Pan American WAKO in -56 kilos low kick, Cancún, México
- 2017:
  - National kickboxing champion WAKO in the category -56 kilos Low Kick
  - WKF Chile Cup champion -60 kilos
  - Bronze medal in the South American WAKO 2017 in the category -56 kilos, Brazil
- 2018:
  - National kickboxing champion WAKO in the category -56 kilos Low Kick
  - WKF Chile Cup champion -60 kilos
  - Gold medal in the 56 kilos category of "low kick-colored belts" in the X Pan American Kickboxing Tournament in Cancún, México
- 2019:
  - Gold medal in the South American Kickboxing in Pucón, Chile
- 2021:
  - Silver medal at the Kickboxing World Cup in Egypt
