= Tembetá =

Body piercing

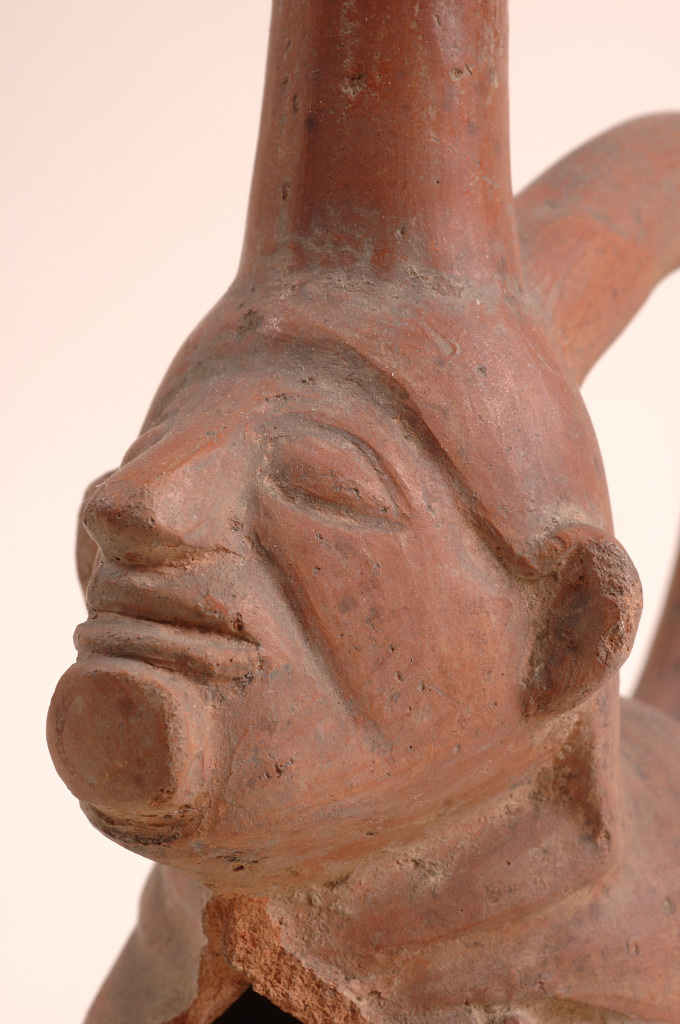
Moche ceramic effigy vessel featuring a man with a tembetá. Museo de Historia natural de Valparaíso, Chile

A tembetá or barbote (Argentina) is a metal or stone rod placed in lower lip piercings by members of some indigenous peoples in South America. It has been used since the Neolithic period by different human groups for body modification, spiritual protection, and indication of sexual maturity.

== Pre-Columbian use ==
According to the first studies of Jorge Fernández, tembetás originated in Planalto, Brazil. Their use expanded as far south as El Quisco, Chile, and they were adopted by indigenous groups such as the Guarani, Tupi, and Chiriguano peoples.

== Sociological importance ==
The tembetá played a part in initiation ceremonies, signifying the entry of young men into adult life. After these ceremonies, the men could marry and acquire the responsibilities of an adult male.

== Corporal use and skill of placement ==
The tembetá is a male adornment in the lower lip. Several men and candidates would meet and drink chicha, a fermented beverage made from maize, to dull the pain. A specialist would perforate the lip with a thick wooden needle. The tembetá would be inserted, and the person would wear it for the remainder of his life.

Participants would ask during the ceremony that the tembetá protect its owner from death. To this end, it was placed near the mouth, a potential entry of damaging forces. Indeed, it was a very important amulet, more than an adornment.

El Molle culture used the adornment, made of rock, preferably of beautiful colors. It consists of a thin curved plate molded to the gums. In the centre was a button, either cylindrical or sharply-pointed, that penetrated the lip 5 to 7 cm (2.0 to 2.8 in).

== Geographical distribution ==
The tembetá is a cultural feature of very wide distribution. It has been used by peoples of Africa, Asia, and the Americas and often it had, apart from it decorative value, a social meaning. Another variant was a pipe of stone, often talc, in the shape of letter "T". These pipe-shaped tembetás could be used in rites to smoke herbs with hallucinogenic properties.

=== Guarani people ===
The tembetá, called "labrete", was used by the tribes of the Guarani. According to archaeological findings, the Guarani tembetá was made of quartz in the shape of a "T", 10 cm (3.9 in) in length. The working of the quartz was done by a shaman. Quartz correlates to ita-verá (brilliant stone) of the mythical one Tupá Overasú, and of the great one Tupá of the Storm.

=== In Chile ===
The tembetá was used in several pre-Columbian cultures in Chile. The principal one was El Molle culture, which brought the tembetá from the Planalto of Brazil. Cultures derived from the Molle were the Diaguita, Llolleo, and Bato.

In the Llolleo culture the tembetá was of cardinal importance, but among the Bato, it was more on the level of a personal adornment, without any spiritual connotations.

== Social differentiation ==
The tembetá offers protection against the negative action of the "owners of the nature"; it is the ritual adornment of the "souls that travel towards the land of beyond". Many neolithic tribes of the Amazon demonstrated a deep scorn for peoples that did not use the tembetá.

== See also ==
- Lip piercing
- Paraguayan Indigenous art
