= Diaguita =

Indigenous people who live in South America

- Flag of the Diaguita people in Chile

Total population
- Approximately 244,025

Regions with significant populations
- Chile: 153,231 (2024)
- Argentina: 90,794 (2022)

Languages
- Cacán • Quechua • Spanish

Related ethnic groups
- Atacameño • Quilmes

The Diaguita people are a South American Indigenous people native to the Chilean Norte Chico and the Argentine Northwest. Western or Chilean Diaguitas lived mainly in the Transverse Valleys that incise semi-arid mountains. Eastern or Argentine Diaguitas lived in the provinces of La Rioja and Catamarca and part of the provinces of Salta, San Juan and Tucumán. The term Diaguita was first applied to peoples and archaeological cultures by Ricardo E. Latcham in the early 20th century.

Ancient Diaguitas were not a unified people; the language or dialects used by them seems to have varied from valley to valley and they were politically fragmented into several chiefdoms. Coastal and inland Chilean Diaguitas traded, as evidenced by the archaeological findings of mollusc shells in the upper courses of Andean valleys.

According to the 2022 census, 90,794 people in Argentina self-identify as Diaguita or Diaguita-Cacano. In Chile, Diaguitas are the third-most populous Indigenous ethnicity after the Aymara and the Mapuche, numbering 153,231 in 2024. The Diaguitas have been recognised as an Indigenous people by the Chilean state since 2006.

== Language ==
Early Spanish accounts, including Jerónimo de Vivar's Crónica y relación copiosa y verdadera de los reinos de Chile, claim the Diaguitas inhabiting the different Transverse Valleys spoke different languages. Jesuits active in western Argentina also report a large number of languages for the region. Nevertheless, the Chilean Diaguitas scholar Herman Carvajal Lazo claims that they could very well have spoken different dialects instead, which would have differed among each other mainly regarding their lexicon.

Cacán was proposed by Rodolfo Schuller and Ricardo E. Latcham to be the single language of the Diaguitas. This proposal has been questioned by some scholars but is accepted by others, like Sergio Villalobos.

There is notable scarcity of Diaguita toponymy in Norte Chico, including the area of Elqui Valley where most Indigenous toponyms has been attributed to either Quechua or Mapuche.

== History ==
The origin of the Diaguita culture is traced back to an archaeological culture known as El Molle complex which existed from 300 to 700 CE. Later, this culture was replaced in Chile by the Las Ánimas complex that developed between 800 and 1000 CE. It is from this last culture that the archaeological Diaguita culture emerged around 1000 CE. The classical Diaguita period was characterized by advanced irrigation systems and by pottery painted in black, white and red.

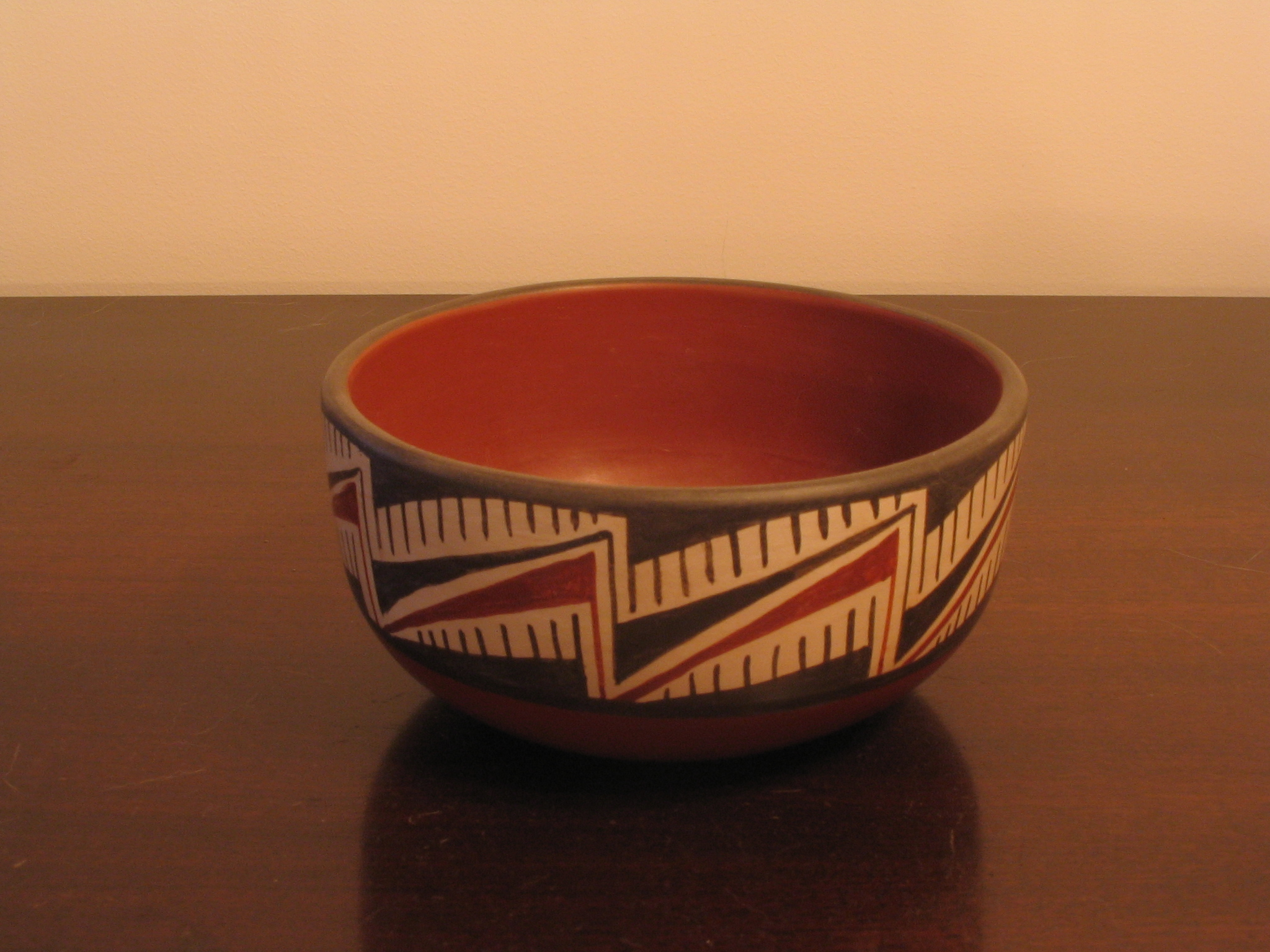
Replica of a Diaguita ceramic bowl from northern Chile

Mapuche communities in the southern Diaguita lands – that is Petorca, La Ligua, Combarbalá and Choapa – may be rooted in pre-Hispanic times at least several centuries before the Spanish arrival. Mapuche toponymy is also found throughout the area. Around Elqui Valley almost all Indigenous toponymy belongs either to Quechua or Mapuche. There is no Diaguita (Kakan) toponymy known in the valley. While there was an immigration of Mapuches to the southern Diaguita lands in colonial times, Mapuche culture there is judged to be older than this. Indeed, in 1954 Grete Mostny postulated the idea of a link between Mapuches and the archaeological culture of El Molle.

It has been claimed that the Inca Empire expanded into Diaguita lands because of its mineral wealth. This hypothesis is currently under dispute. Another possibility is that the Incas invaded the relatively well-populated Eastern Diaguita valleys to obtain labor to send to Chilean mining districts. It is generally accepted that Diaguita incorporation into the Inca Empire was through warfare that caused a severe depopulation in the Transverse Valleys of Norte Chico. According to scholar Ana María Lorandi the Diaguitas, and specially the Calchaquí Diaguitas, would not have been conquered easily by the Inca Empire. Once conquered, the eastern Diaguitas did not unanimously accept Inca rule. The Incas appointed kurakas and established mitmas in the Chilean Diaguita lands. The Diaguitas took influences from the Incas, adopting pottery designs from Cuzco, and Inca techniques in agriculture and metalworking.

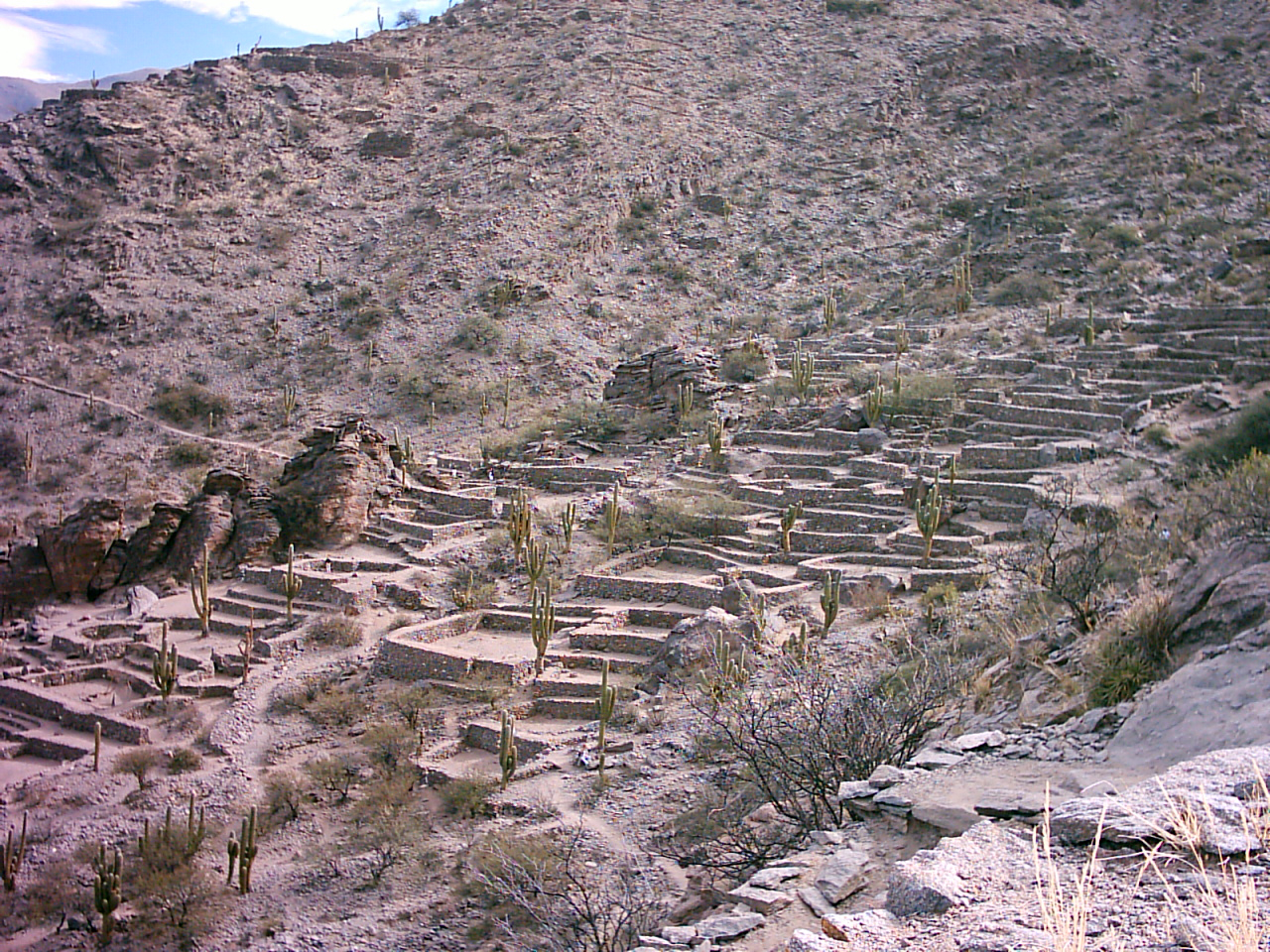
The Ruins of Quilmes were built by the Quilmes, a Diaguita people.

The Chilean Diaguitas were conquered by Spaniards coming from Peru. While not a definitive conquest, the first large encounter of Spanish and the Chilean Diaguitas occurred in April 1536 when the expedition of Diego de Almagro arrived to the valley of Copiapó having crossed the Andes, probably through San Francisco Pass, from the east. There are estimates of about 20,000 Diaguitas inhabiting the territory of what is now Chile at the time of Spanish arrival.

The eastern Diaguitas lands were explored by Spaniards coming from Chile, the Paraná River and Peru. In what came to be called the Calchaquí Wars, the Spanish initially failed to conquer the fertile valleys inhabited by the Eastern Diaguitas, and could only control the eastern valley ends. By founding the cities of Santiago del Estero (1550s), Tucumán (1565), Salta (1582), La Rioja (1591) and Jujuy (1593) the Spanish established an effective fence around the rebellious Eastern Diaguita valleys. To further dominate the Diaguitas, the city of Londres was founded in 1607 in the middle of the Eastern Diaguita territory.

During the government of García Hurtado de Mendoza in Chile (1557–1561) Chilean Diaguitas that had rebelled were decimated by the Spanish. The Calchaquí Diaguitas of the eastern side of the Andes rose against Spanish rule in 1630 and the last rebels fought until 1642–1643. In this rebellion, the Spanish city of La Rioja came close to being destroyed. The Calchaquí Diaguitas only entered Spanish rule after 1665.

The Diaguita languages in Chile may have been largely lost during a process of miscegenation with Mapuche-speaking populations.

== Archaeological chronology in Chile ==
Period	Culture	Pottery
Late (1000 CE–1550 CE)	Hispanic	Diaguita, Inca and Colonial
Late (1000 CE–1550 CE)	Diaguita culture	Diaguita III and Inca
Late (1000 CE–1550 CE)	Diaguita culture	Diaguita II
Late (1000 CE–1550 CE)	Diaguita culture	Diaguita I
Middle (700 CE–1000 CE)	Las Ánimas culture	Las Ánimas ceramics (I, II and III)
Early (300 BCE–700 CE)	El Molle culture	El Molle ceramics

== Notable people ==
- Diana Sacayán (1975–2015), Argentine transgender activist

== See also ==
- Atacameño people
- Chango people
- Mapuche history
- Prehispanic history of Chile

== Bibliography ==
- Ampuero Brito, Gonzalo (1978). Cultura diaguita (PDF) (in Spanish). Departamento de Extensión Cultural del Ministerio de Educación.
- Montes, Aníbal (1961). El gran alzamiento diaguita (in Spanish). Rosario, Argentina.
- Téllez, Eduardo (2008). Los Diaguitas: Estudios (in Spanish). Santiago, Chile: Ediciones Akhilleus. ISBN 978-956-8762-00-1.
