= Wampo =

Vessel constructed from a single piece of tree trunk

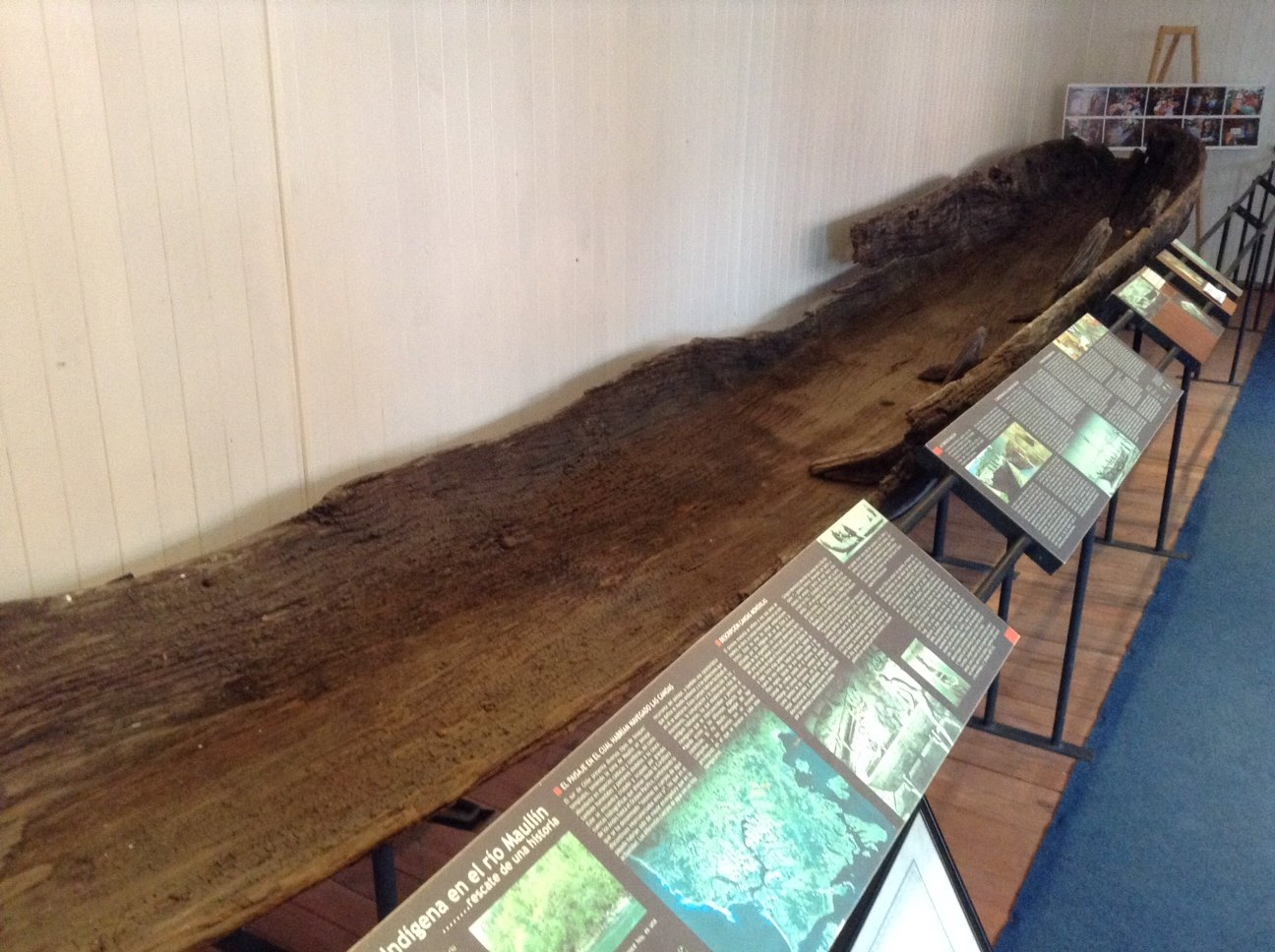
A wampo vessel located in the Maullín Museum.

Wampo is a vessel that is constructed from single piece of tree trunk. These canoes are not only used for travelling, but also for gainful activities on water. Not all trees were selected for building a wampo, but old and robust specimens were the ones chosen.

Wampos have been used since pre-Hispanic times.

== Burials ==
A documented case exist where wampo was used as burial object.

== See also ==
Lafkenche, group of people who use wampos
