= Leonardo León =

Chilean historian

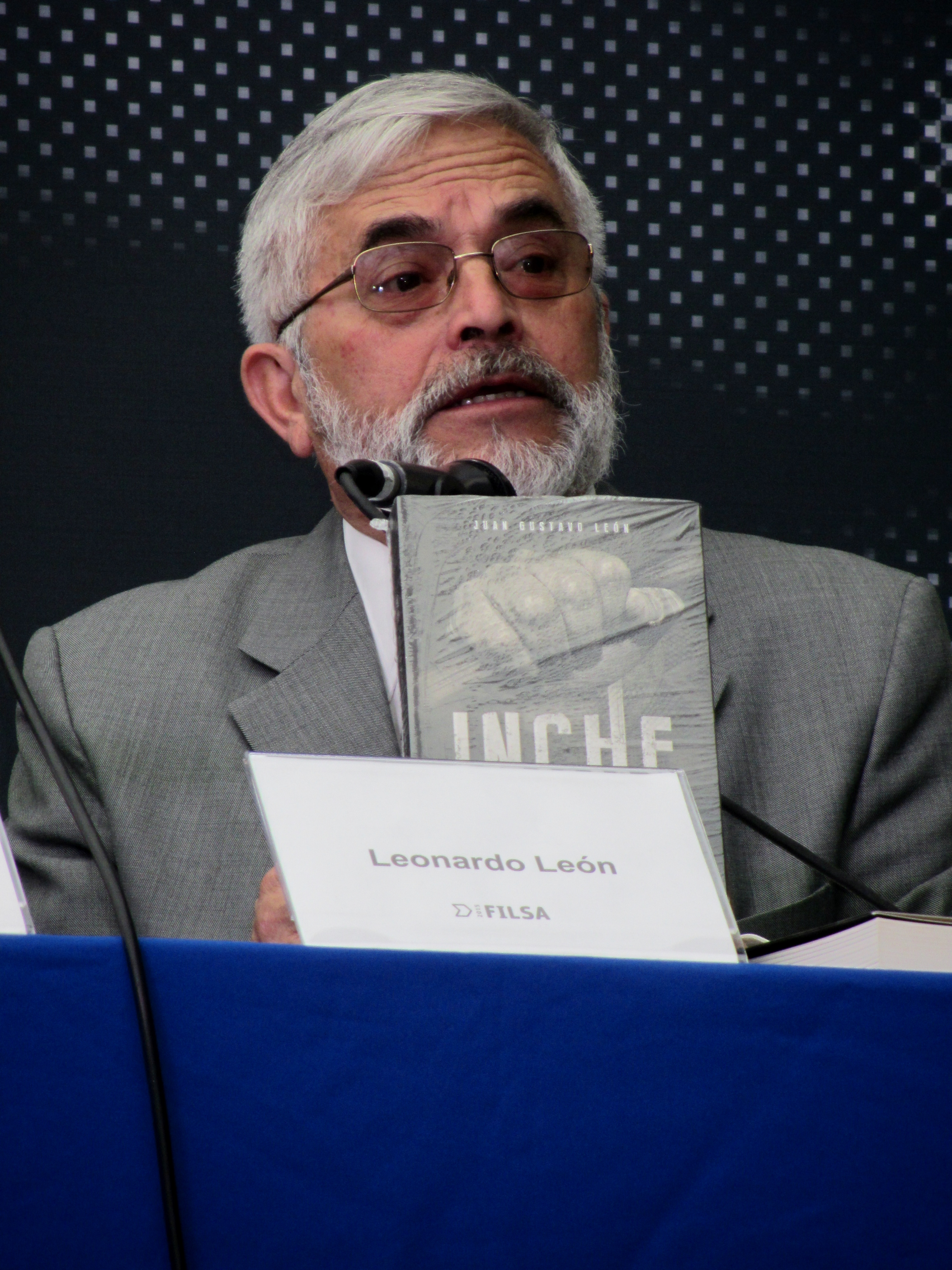
- Born: 1952 (age 73–74)
- Occupation: Historian
- Years active: 1980s–present
- Known for: Study of La Frontera

Leonardo León (born 1952) is a Chilean historian known for his work the Mapuche world, history of the frontier and more recently by the study of the lower classes during the Chilean War of Independence.
