= Quebrada Mamilla =

Deep Valley formation

Coordinates: 21°58′15.70″S 70°9′20.84″W

Quebrada Mamilla is a ravine in northern Chile's Antofagasta Region. The ravine is accessed from the Chile Route 1 that unites coastal cities of Iquique and Tocopilla. It is located about 10 km north of Tocopilla. Fourteen archaeological sites have been identified in Quebrada Mamilla. It is thought to have an etymology based on milla, the Mapuche word for gold.
