= Ricardo E. Latcham =

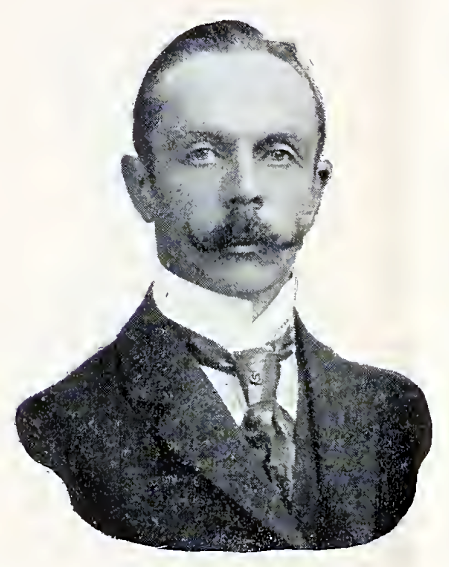
- Latcham, circa 1910
- Born: Richard Edward Latcham; 5 March 1869; Thornbury, U.K.
- Died: 16 October 1943 (aged 74); Santiago, Chile
- Occupations: Archaeologist, ethnologist
- Employer: Chilean National Museum of Natural History

Ricardo Eduardo Latcham Cartwright (Thornbury, England, 5 March 1869 – Santiago, Chile, 16 October 1943) was an English-Chilean archaeologist, ethnologist, folklore scholar and teacher.

Born and raised near Bristol, England, as Richard Edward Latcham, he immigrated as a young man to Chile. There he became known for his ethnological and archeological work related to the indigenous Mapuche, Diaguita and Chango peoples.

He worked for the Chilean National Museum of Natural History. Based on his contributions, he was selected as a member of the Royal Anthropological Institute of Great Britain and Ireland.

Latcham married in Chile and had a son with his wife. Their son is Ricardo A. Latcham, known as an Anglo-Chilean writer and historian.
