= Transverse Valleys =

East-west low-lying areas in northern Chile

The Transverse Valleys (Spanish: Valles transversales) are a group of transverse valleys in the semi-arid northern Chile. They run from east to west (traversing Chile), being among the most prominent geographical features in the regions they cross. They are located in the Chilean regions of Valparaíso, Coquimbo, and Atacama. They share some characteristics, such as reaching the Pacific Ocean without passing through an Intermediate Depression, being rather deep and dissecting the landscape, concentrating most agriculture and population in the areas through which they pass, and being intensively cultivated. They are one of the defining elements of the Chilean natural region of Norte Chico. The area of the Transverse Valleys spans roughly 600 km from north to south.

Transverse Valleys
Name	Photo	Region	Reference
Copiapó Valley		Atacama	
Huasco Valley		Atacama	
Elqui Valley		Coquimbo	
Limarí Valley		Coquimbo	
Choapa Valley		Coquimbo	
Aconcagua Valley		Valparaíso	

== See also ==
- Agriculture in Chile
- Astronomy in Chile
- Chilean Matorral
- Diaguita
- Flowering desert
