= Grete Mostny =

Austrian-Chilean anthropologist (1914–1991)

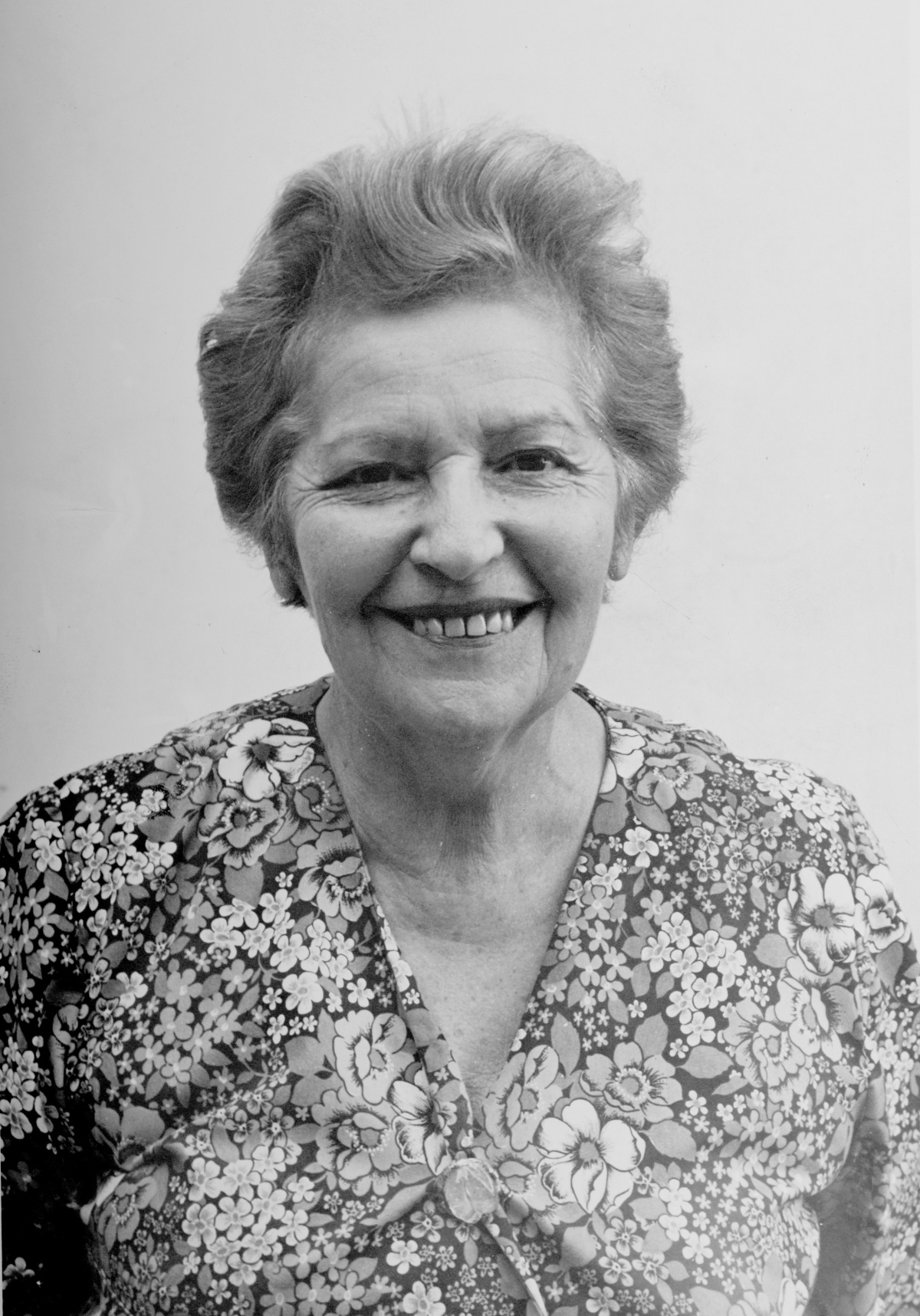
- Mostny in an unknown date
- Born: 17 September 1914; Linz
- Died: 15 December 1991 (aged 77); Santiago
- Employer: Chilean National Museum of Natural History

Grete Mostny (17 September 1914 – 15 December 1991) was a Jewish Austrian who became a leading Chilean anthropologist. She was born in Austria but had to leave because of the rise of the Nazis. She went to Belgium to complete her studies before leaving for Chile. At the end of the war she was invited back to Austria but she preferred to become a naturalised Chilean. She led a number of archaeological investigations and the Chilean National Museum of Natural History.

== Life ==
Mostny was born in Linz in 1914. She enrolled at Vienna University but she had to leave in 1937 because of the rise of the Nazis. She had already completed her dissertation on the clothes of ancient Egypt and part of her exams but she had to complete her doctorate in Brussels in Belgium in 1939. She had already taken part in archaeological investigations at both Luxor and Cairo in Egypt. She left with her brother, Kurt, and her mother for Chile. Chile took in a large number of German refugees in 1939. There was already a significant German community in Chile, but this was also a source of anti-Semitism.

At the end of the war she was invited back to Austria but she preferred to become a naturalised Chilean in 1946.

She led a number of archaeological investigations in South America. In 1954 she was involved when her museum took delivery of the Plomo Mummy. This mummy was the remains of a child found on a mountain where it had been sacrificed by the Incas.

Mostny took over from Humberto Fuenzalida and led the Chilean National Museum of Natural History in Santiago from 1964 to 1982.

Mostny died from cancer in Santiago in 1991.

== Legacy ==
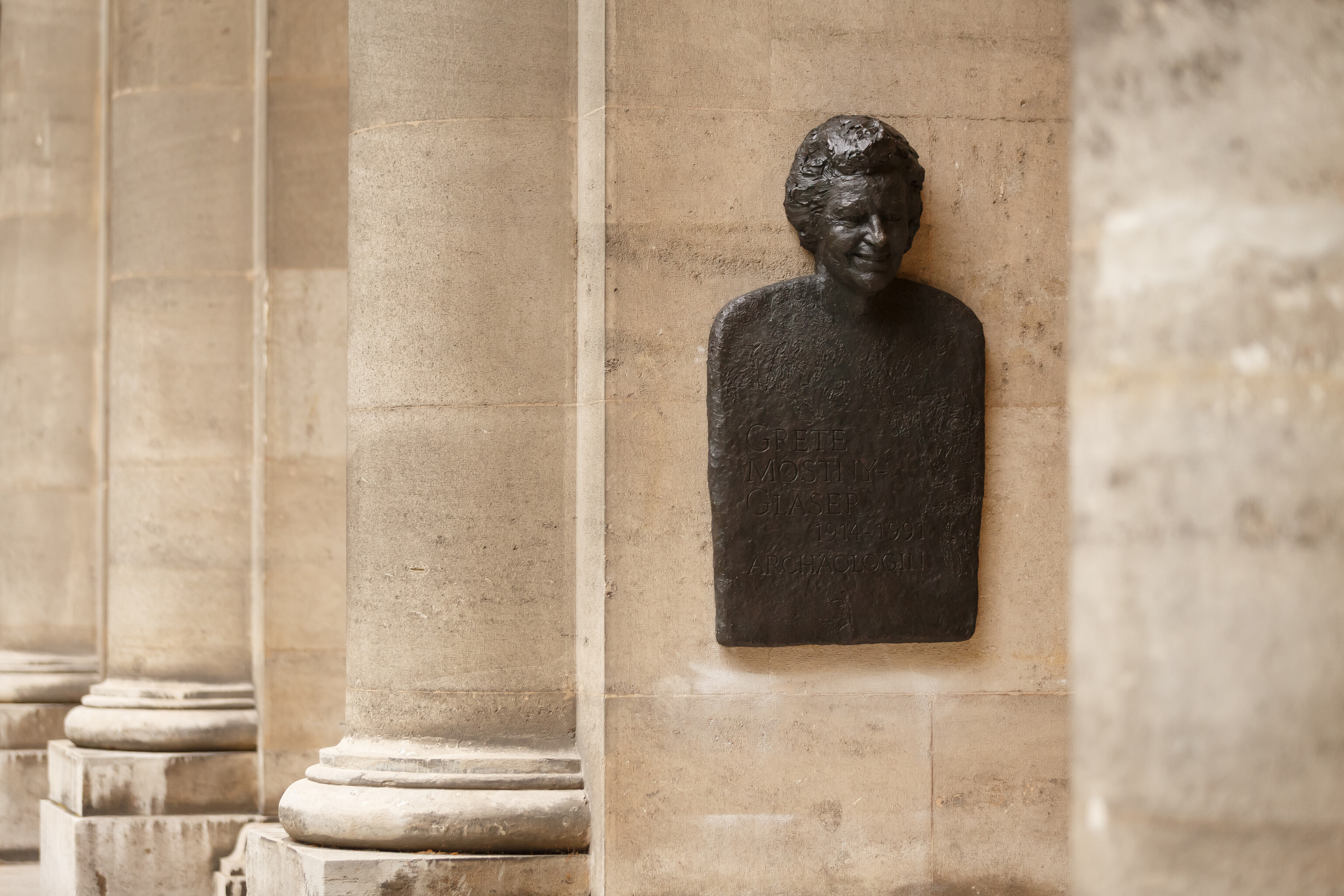
Memorial to Grete Mostny at the University of Vienna

The University of Vienna records her biography as she was an expelled student and a victim of National Socialism. The university gives a prize for a dissertation in honour of Grete Mostny. The prize is for a dissertation in the Historical and Cultural Studies faculty and it has been awarded since 2013. Mostny's dissertation is stored in ceramic form in a salt mine in Hallstatt.

== Selected works ==
- Culturas precolombinas de Chile, 1954
- Peine, un pueblo atacameño, 1954
- Los museos de Chile , 1975
- Prehistoria de Chile , 1971
- Arte rupestre chileno, 1983
