= Chango people =

Chango
Chango

- Chango people with a traditional sea lion skin raft in Pisagua, 1902

Total population
- ~4,725 people declared

Regions with significant populations
- Coast of Atacama Desert
- Chile: 11,795 (2024 census)

Languages
- Spanish, Mapudungun, Aymara

Religion
- Roman Catholicism, Mapuche religion

Related ethnic groups
- Mapuche?

The Changos, also known as Camanchacos or Camanchangos, are an Indigenous people or group of peoples who inhabited a long stretch of the Pacific coast from southern Peru to north-central Chile, including the coast of the Atacama Desert. Although much of the customs and culture of the Chango people have disappeared and in many cases they have been considered extinct, in Chile they are legally recognized as an original indigenous people since 2020, and about 4,725 people self-declare that they belong to this ethnic group.

== History ==
=== Definition and context of the Changos ===
The culture originated in the 8,000-year-old Chinchorro tradition. Due to a combination of conquest and integration into other cultures and ethnicities, the Chango culture is now considered extinct. However, in Chile they are legally recognized as an original indigenous people since 2020, and about 4,725 people self-declare that they belong to this ethnic group.

Distribution of the pre-Hispanic people of Chile

The Changos were not a distinct tribe or ethnic group; rather, the term is used to refer to many disparate communities of indigenous people living along the northern Chilean and southern Peruvian coast in the Pre-Columbian era. The term "chango" was first documented in the 17th century by Spanish conquistadors who perceived little in the way of cultural difference between the local native communities. Therefore, "chango" describes a loose grouping of maritime peoples who shared a similar way of life rather than a common history or ethnicity. Chango culture developed adjacent to neighbouring cultures such as the Atacameños. Chango culture is part of the Chinchorro tradition. The Chinchorro were hunter-fisher-gatherers with a particular reliance on the sea, who lived along the Atacama Desert coast from at least the 8th century BC. They are of special interest to modern anthropologists due to their practice of mummifying the dead.

Some older works starting with Benjamín Vicuña Mackenna (1869) claim the Changos people extended once as far south as Valparaíso (33° S), but clear evidence for this is lacking.

One early Spanish source mention the color of the Chango's skin as red and it is possible that 16th century Changos covered their skin using red iron pigments.

=== Chango economy ===
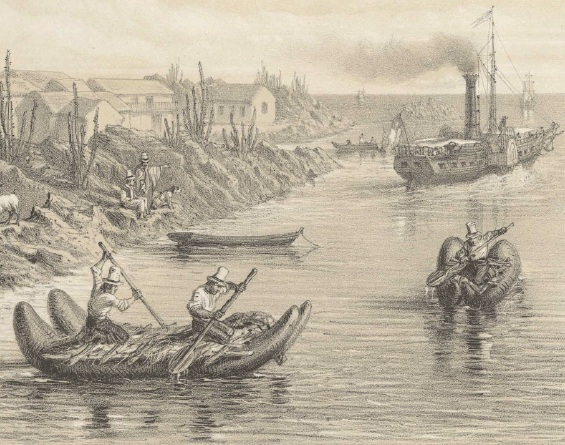
Chango rafts in the Chilean port of Huasco in the 1850s

Chango communities were organised into either nomadic or sedentary groups based on nuclear family units. Each group was independent of the others, providing food and other resources for itself. The Changos were experts at exploiting the resources of the sea. Each group specialised in a particular type of fish, including tuna, conger eels, mullet, mackerel and octopus. Rafts used for fishing developed from primitive reed constructions to craft made from three wooden planks, and later to seal skins fastened to wooden frames. Fish were caught using nets, hooks and harpoons. The capture of seals was of crucial importance to the Chango way of life, with every part of the animal having its uses. The meat, fat and bones were used for food and tools, the skins were used to make rafts and the intestines to make fishing equipment. As well as seal skins, the Changos used vicuña wool, feathers, bird skins, shells and the bones and teeth of sea creatures as materials to make practical and decorative items such as clothing, blankets, tools, cutlery and jewellery. They also made and painted ceramic utensils. Despite their geographical isolation, the Changos traded with inland tribes, exchanging shellfish, dried fish, animal hide, guano, fat and shells for wool, fruit, maize and coca. Chango cave paintings include images of men hunting and fishing and sea creatures such as seals, turtles and whales.

By 1835 it was reported by Alcide d'Orbigny that Changos living next to Cobija engaged in smuggling of Bolivian silver using their rafts to reach anchored ships.

== Language ==
Chango
- Native to: Chile
- Ethnicity: c. 4,725 Changos
- Extinct: (date missing)
- Language family: unclassified

Language codes
- ISO 639-3: None (mis)
- Glottolog: None

The original language of the Changos is basically unknown. It is known only from toponyms and place names (Mason 1950). Loukotka (1968) classified it with Uru–Chipaya, but there is insufficient information to determine this. Their language was distinct from those of the Kunza, Quechua, and Aymara (Latcham 1910).

Changos around Paposo appear by 1870 to have spoken a dialect of Mapudungun, the language of the Mapuche people of south-central Chile. In the coast of Antofagasta Region there are toponyms near the coast claimed to be Mapuche including Taltal and Quebrada Mamilla.

== See also ==
- Indigenous peoples in Chile
- Atacama Desert
- Chinchorro culture
