= History of Panama (1821–1903) =

Panama is a transcontinental country spanning the southern part of North America and the northern part of South America.

== Independence ==
Panama would remain as a royalist stronghold and outpost until 1821 (the year of Panama's revolution against Spain). Panama City immediately initiated plans to declare independence, but the city of Los Santos preempted the move by proclaiming freedom from Spain on November 10, 1821. This act precipitated a meeting in Panama City on November 28, which is celebrated as the official date of independence. Considerable discussion followed as to whether Panama should remain part of Colombia (then comprising both the present-day country and Venezuela) or unite with Peru. The bishop of Panama, a native Peruvian who realized the commercial ties that could be developed with his country, argued for the latter solution but was voted down. A third possible course of action, a union with Mexico proposed by emissaries of that country, was rejected.

Panama thus became part of Colombia, then governed under the 1821 Constitution of Cúcuta, and was designated a department with two provinces, Panamá and Veraguas. With the addition of Ecuador to the liberated area, the whole country became known as Gran Colombia. Panama sent a force of 700 men to join Simón Bolívar in Peru, where the Peruvian War of Independence continued.

The termination of hostilities against the royalists in 1824 failed to bring tranquillity to Gran Colombia. The constitution that Bolívar had drafted for Bolivia was put forward by him to be adopted in Gran Colombia. The country was divided principally over the proposal that a president would serve for life. The president would not be responsible to the legislature and would have power to select his vice president. Other provisions, generally centralist in their tendencies, were repugnant to some, while a few desired a monarchy. Panama escaped armed violence over the constitutional question but joined other regions in petitioning Bolívar to assume dictatorial powers until a convention could meet. Panama announced its union with Gran Colombia as a "Hanseatic State", i.e., as an autonomous area with special trading privileges until the convention was held.

In 1826 Bolívar honored Panama when he chose it as the site for a congress of the recently liberated Spanish colonies. Many leaders of the revolutions in Latin America considered the establishment of a single government for the former Spanish colonies the natural follow-up to driving out the peninsulares. Both José de San Martín and Francisco de Miranda proposed creating a single vast monarchy ruled by an emperor descended from the Incas. Bolívar, however, was the one who made the most serious attempt to unite the Spanish American republics.

Although the league or confederation envisioned by Bolívar was to foster the blessings of liberty and justice, a primary purpose was to secure the independence of the former colonies from renewed attacks by Spain and its allies. In this endeavor Bolívar sought Britain's protection. He was reluctant to invite representatives of the United States, even as observers, to the congress of plenipotentiaries lest their collaboration compromise the league's position with the British. Furthermore, Bolívar felt that the neutrality of the United States in the war between Spain and its former colonies would make its representation inappropriate. In addition, slavery in the United States would be an obstacle in discussing the abolition of the African slave trade. Bolívar nevertheless acquiesced when the governments of Colombia, Mexico, and Central America invited the United States to send observers.

Despite the sweeping implications of the Monroe Doctrine, President John Quincy Adams—in deciding to send delegates to the Panama conference—was not disposed to obligate the United States to defend its southern neighbors. Adams instructed his delegates to refrain from participating in deliberations concerning regional security and to emphasize discussions of maritime neutrality and commerce. Nevertheless, many members of the United States Congress opposed participation under any conditions. By the time participation was approved, the delegation had no time to reach the conference. The British and Dutch sent unofficial representatives.

The Congress of Panama, which convened in June and adjourned in July 1826, was attended by four American states—Mexico, Central America, Colombia, and Peru. The Treaty of Union, League, and Perpetual Confederation drawn up at that congress would have bound all parties to mutual defense and to the peaceful settlement of disputes. Furthermore, because some feared that monarchical elements sympathetic to Spain and its allies might regain control of one of the new republics, the treaty included a provision that if a member state substantially changed its form of government, it would be excluded from the confederation and could be readmitted only with the unanimous consent of all other members.

The treaty was ratified only by Colombia and never became effective. Bolívar, having made several futile attempts to establish lesser federations, declared shortly before his death in 1830 that "America is ungovernable; those who served the revolution have plowed the sea." Despite his disillusion, however, he did not see United States protection as a substitute for collective security arrangements among the Spanish-speaking states. In fact, he is credited with having said, "The United States seems destined by Providence to plague America with misery in the name of Liberty."

Three abortive attempts to separate the isthmus from Colombia occurred between 1830 and 1840. The first was undertaken by an acting governor of Panama who opposed the policies of the president, but the Panamanian leader reincorporated the department of Panama at the urging of Bolívar, then on his deathbed. The second attempted separation was the scheme of an unpopular dictator, who was soon deposed and executed. The third secession, a response to civil war in Colombia, was declared by a popular assembly, but reintegration took place a year later. The only time that Panama gained a constitutional profile of its own, was in the context of the War of the Supremes (1839-1842), led by Tomás de Herrera in Panama, when it was part of the federalist movement and adopted the Fundamental Law and Constitution of the State of the Isthmus which, however, never gained any real validity as Panama reunited with Colombia in 1841.

== The California gold rush and the railroad ==
Even before the United States acquired California after the Mexican–American War (1846–48), many heading for California used the isthmus crossing in preference to the long and dangerous wagon route across the vast plains and rugged mountain ranges. Discovery of gold in 1848 increased traffic greatly. In 1847 a group of New York City financiers organized the Panama Railroad Company. This company secured an exclusive concession from Colombia allowing construction of a crossing, which might be by road, rail, river, or a combination. After surveys, a railroad was chosen, and a new contract so specifying was obtained in 1850. The railroad track followed generally the line of the present canal. The first through train from the Atlantic to the Pacific side ran on the completed track on January 28, 1855.

The gold rush traffic, even before the completion of the railroad, restored Panama's prosperity. Between 1848 and 1869, about 375,000 persons crossed the isthmus from the Atlantic to the Pacific, and 225,000 crossed in the opposite direction. Prices for food and services were greatly inflated, producing enormous profits from meals and lodging.

The railroad also created a new city and port at the Atlantic terminus of the line. The town that immediately sprang up to accommodate the railroad offices, warehouses, docks, and shops and to lodge both railroad workers and passengers soon became, and remains, the second largest in the country. United States citizens named it Aspinwall, after one of the founders of the Panama Railroad Company, but the Panamanians christened it Colón, in honor of Columbus. Both names were used for many years, but because the Panamanians insisted that no such place as Aspinwall existed and refused to deliver mail so addressed, the name Colón prevailed.

The gold rush and the railroad also brought the United States "Wild West" to the isthmus. The forty-niners tended to be an unruly lot, usually bored as they waited for a ship to California, frequently drunk, and often armed. Many also displayed prejudice verging on contempt for other races and cultures. The so-called Watermelon Riot of 1856, in which at least sixteen persons were killed, was the most serious clash of races and cultures of the period.

In 1869 the First transcontinental railroad was completed in the United States. This development reduced passenger and freight traffic across the isthmus and diminished the amount of gold and silver shipped east. During the height of the gold rush, however, from 1855 to 1858, only one-tenth of the ordinary commercial freight was destined for or originated in California. The balance concerned trade of the North Americans with Europe and Asia. The railroad company, because of its exceptionally high financial return, paid a total of nearly US$38 million in dividends between 1853 and 1905. Panama received US$25,000 from Colombia's annuity and benefited from transient trade and some inflow of capital.

== The uncompleted French canal ==
Throughout the nineteenth century, governments and private investors in the United States, Britain, and France intermittently displayed interest in building a canal across the Western Hemisphere. Several sites were considered, but from the start the ones in Nicaragua and Panama received the most serious attention. President Andrew Jackson sent Charles A. Biddle as his emissary in the 1830s to investigate both routes, but the project was aborted when Biddle abandoned his government mission and negotiated instead with Colombian capitalists for a private concession.

Nevertheless, Colombia continued to express interest in negotiating with the United States on building a canal. A treaty was signed in 1846 between the two countries. The treaty removed the existing restrictive tariffs and gave the United States and its citizens the right of free transit of persons and goods over any road or canal that might be constructed in the isthmus. In addition, the United States guaranteed the neutrality of the isthmus and Colombia's sovereignty over it, with a view to ensuring uninterrupted transit for the duration of the treaty, which was to be twenty years or as long thereafter as the parties gave no notice to revise it. Called the Mallarino–Bidlack Treaty of 1846, it was actually ratified and became effective in 1848.

Because the canal interests of Britain and the United States had continued to clash, particularly in Nicaragua, Britain and the United States sought to ease tensions by entering into the Clayton–Bulwer Treaty of 1850. The governments agreed specifically that neither would acquire rights to or construct a Nicaraguan canal without the participation of the other. This general principle was extended to any canal or railroad across Central America, to include the Isthmus of Tehuantepec in Mexico and Panama. In effect, since neither government was then willing or able to begin a canal, the treaty was for the time an instrument of neutrality.

Colombia's attempt to attract canal interest finally brought French attention to bear on Panama. After several surveys, a concession of exclusive rights was obtained from Colombia, and a company was formed in 1879 to construct a sea-level canal generally along the railroad route. Ferdinand de Lesseps, of Suez Canal fame, headed the company. The terms of the concession required completion in twelve years, with the possibility of a six-year extension at Colombia's discretion. The lease was for ninety years and was transferable, but not to any foreign government. The company also purchased most of the stock of the Panama Railroad Company, which, however, continued to be managed by Americans.

A ceremonious commencement of work was staged by de Lesseps on January 1, 1880, but serious earth moving did not start until the next year. As work progressed, engineers judged that a sea-level canal was impracticable. De Lesseps, a promoter but not an engineer, could not be convinced until work had gone on for six years. Actual labor on a lock canal did not start until late in 1888, by which time the company was in serious financial difficulty. At the peak of its operations the company employed about 10,000 workers.

De Lesseps had to contend not only with enemies who hampered financing by spreading rumors of failure and dumping stocks and bonds on the market but also with venal French politicians and bureaucrats who demanded large bribes for approving the issue of securities. His efforts to get the French government to guarantee his bonds were blocked by the United States, on the grounds that such action would lead to government control in violation of the Monroe Doctrine. The result in January 1889 was the appointment of a receiver to liquidate the company, whereupon all work stopped.

Despite the French company's disastrous financial experience, an estimated two-fifths of the excavation necessary for the eventual canal had been completed. Many headquarters and hospital buildings were finished. Some of the machinery left on the site was usable later, and the railroad had been maintained. Another legacy of the French company's bankruptcy was a large labor force, now unemployed, mostly Antillean blacks. More than half were repatriated, but thousands remained, many of whom eventually worked on the United States canal.

== The spillover from Colombia's civil strife ==
During the last half of the nineteenth century, violent clashes between the supporters of the Liberal and Conservative parties in Colombia left the isthmus' affairs in constant turmoil. Local self-government for the department of Panama was extended when the Liberals were in power and withdrawn when the Conservatives prevailed. The Catholic Church was disestablished under the Liberals and reestablished under the Conservatives. The fortunes of local partisans rose and fell abruptly and often violently.

According to one estimate, the period witnessed forty administrations of the Panamanian department, fifty riots and rebellions, five attempted secessions, and thirteen interventions by the United States, acting under the provisions of the Bidlack-Mallarino Treaty. Partisan clashes and foreign intervention exacerbated racial antagonisms and economic problems and intensified grievances against the central government of Colombia.

Between 1863 and 1886, the isthmus had twenty-six presidents. Coup d'état, rebellions, and violence were almost continuous, staged by troops of the central government, by local citizens against centrally imposed edicts, and by factions out of power. The chaotic conditions that had prevailed under the federalist constitution of 1863 culminated in the 1884 election of Rafael Núñez as president of Colombia, supported by a coalition of moderate Liberals and Conservatives. Núñez called all factions to participate in a new constituent assembly, but his request was met by an armed revolt of the radical Liberals.

Early in 1885, the Panama crisis of 1885 took place. A revolt headed by a radical Liberal general and centered in Panama City developed into a three-way fight. Colón was virtually destroyed. United States forces landed at the request of the Colombian government but were too late to save the city from being burned. Millions of dollars in claims were submitted by companies and citizens of the United States, France, and Britain, but Colombia successfully pleaded its lack of responsibility.

Additional United States naval forces occupied both Colón and Panama City and guarded the railroad to ensure uninterrupted transit until Colombian forces landed to protect the railroad. The new constitution of 1886 established the Republic of Colombia as a unitary state, with departments were distinctly subordinate to the central government. Panama was singled out as subject to the direct authority of the government. The United States consul general reported that three-quarters of the Panamanians wanted independence from Colombia and would revolt if they could get arms and be sure of freedom from United States intervention.

Panama was drawn into Colombia's Thousand Days' War (1899–1902) by rebellious radical Liberals who had taken refuge in Nicaragua. Like the rest of Colombia, opinion in Panama was divided, and revolts in the southwest had hardly been suppressed when Liberals from Nicaragua invaded the Pacific coastal region and nearly succeeded in taking Panama City in mid-1900. The fortunes of war varied, and although a local armistice gave supporters of the Colombian government temporary security in the Panama-Colón region, the rebels were in control throughout the isthmus. Meanwhile, by early 1902 the rebels had been defeated in most of Colombia proper. At that point, the Colombian government asked the United States to intercede and bring about an armistice in Panama, which was arranged aboard the USS Wisconsin in the Bay of Panama in 1902.

Throughout the period of turmoil, the United States had retained its interest in building a canal through either Nicaragua or Panama. An obstacle to this goal was overcome in December 1901 when the United States and Britain signed the Hay–Pauncefote Treaty. This treaty nullified the provisions of the Clayton–Bulwer Treaty of 1850 and signified British acceptance of a canal constructed solely by or under the auspices of the United States with guarantees of neutrality.

== The 1903 treaty and qualified independence ==
Naval operations during the Spanish–American War (1898–1901) served to convince U.S. President Theodore Roosevelt that the United States needed to control a canal somewhere in the Western Hemisphere. This interest culminated in the Spooner Bill of June 29, 1902, providing for a canal through the isthmus of Panama, and the Hay–Herrán Treaty of January 22, 1903, under which Colombia gave consent to such a project in the form of a 100-year lease on an area 10 kilometers wide. This treaty, however, was not ratified in Bogotá, and the United States, determined to construct a canal across the isthmus, intensively encouraged the Panamanian separatist movement.

By July 1903, when the course of internal Colombian opposition to the Hay–Herrán Treaty became obvious, a revolutionary junta had been created in Panama. José Augustin Arango, an attorney for the Panama Railroad Company, headed the junta. Manuel Amador Guerrero and Carlos C. Arosemena served on the junta from the start, and five other members, all from prominent Panamanian families, were added. Arango was considered the brains of the revolution, and Amador was the junta's active leader.

With financial assistance arranged by Philippe Bunau-Varilla, a French national representing the interests of Lesseps's company, the native Panamanian leaders conspired to take advantage of United States interest in a new regime on the isthmus. In October and November 1903, the revolutionary junta, with the protection of United States naval forces, carried out a successful uprising against the Colombian government. Acting, paradoxically, under the Mallarino–Bidlack Treaty of 1846 between the United States and Colombia—which provided that United States forces could intervene in the event of disorder on the isthmus to guarantee Colombian sovereignty and open transit across the isthmus—the United States prevented a Colombian force from moving across the isthmus to Panama City to suppress the insurrection.

President Roosevelt recognized the new Panamanian junta as the de facto government on November 6, 1903; de jure recognition came on November 13. Five days later Bunau-Varilla, as the diplomatic representative of Panama (a role he had purchased through financial assistance to the rebels) concluded the Isthmian Canal Convention with Secretary of State John Hay in Washington, D.C. Bunau-Varilla had not lived in Panama for seventeen years before the incident, and he never returned. Nevertheless, while residing in the Waldorf-Astoria Hotel in New York City, he wrote the Panamanian declaration of independence and constitution and designed the Panamanian flag. Isthmian patriots particularly resented the haste with which Bunau-Varilla concluded the treaty, an effort partially designed to preclude any objections an arriving Panamanian delegation might raise. Nonetheless, the Panamanians, having no apparent alternative, ratified the treaty on December 2, and approval by the United States Senate came on February 23, 1904.

The rights granted to the United States in the so-called Hay–Bunau-Varilla Treaty were extensive. They included the right to intervene in Panama's domestic affairs to guarantee its independence, and a grant "in perpetuity of the use, occupation, and control" of a sixteen-kilometer-wide strip of territory and extensions of three nautical miles into the sea from each terminal "for the construction, maintenance, operation, sanitation, and protection" of an isthmian canal.

Furthermore, the United States was entitled to acquire additional areas of land or water necessary for canal operations and held the option of exercising eminent domain in Panama City. Within this territory Washington gained "all the rights, power, and authority . . . which the United States would possess and exercise if it were the sovereign ... to the entire exclusion" of Panama. For the rights it obtained, the United States was to pay the sum of US$10 million and an annuity, beginning 9 years after ratification, of US$250,000 in gold coin. The United States also purchased the rights and properties of the French canal company for US$40 million.

Colombia was the harshest critic of United States policy at the time. A reconciliatory treaty with the United States providing an indemnity of US$25 million was finally concluded between these two countries in 1921 and finally by 1922. Ironically, however, friction resulting from the events of 1903 was greatest between the United States and Panama. Major disagreements arose concerning the rights granted to the United States by the treaty of 1903 and the Panamanian constitution of 1904. The United States government subsequently interpreted these rights to mean that the United States could exercise complete sovereignty over all matters in the Canal Zone. Panama, although admitting that the clauses were vague and obscure, later held that the original concession of authority related only to the construction, operation, and defense of the canal and that rights and privileges not necessary to these functions had never been relinquished.
