= Randolph Runnels =

Randolph "Ran" Runnels (born c. 1827) was an American soldier and lawman. He fought in the Mexican–American War and then traveled to Panama region of the Republic of New Granada in 1849 where he ran a business transporting goods and passengers across the isthmus by riverboat and mule team. In 1854, he was authorized by the Panamanian governor, Urrutia Añino, to lead an armed police force to fight banditry along the Panama Railroad line.

His notoriety as a "hangman" is unsubstantiated and based on fictional accounts published in the 1930s and later.

== Early life ==
Runnels was born in Mississippi in December, 1827. By the age of nine he had become an orphan and was placed under the guardianship of his uncle, Hiram George Runnels, former governor of Mississippi. In 1842, Hiram George Runnels moved his family, including fourteen-year-old Randolph, to a plantation in Brazoria County, Texas.

In 1846, at the outbreak of the Mexican-American War, Runnels joined the First Texas Mounted Riflemen, a unit that saw action at the Battle of Monterrey in September 1846. The Texas mounted volunteers were known as rangers, and Runnels became known as a Texas Ranger, an identity that would later contribute to his reputation for toughness in Panama.

== Panama ==
In early 1849, Runnels settled in Panama, then part of the Republic of New Granada, just as the region was becoming a major transit point for Americans traveling to and from the California Gold Rush. He bought a local transportation business and began taking California‐bound passengers and freight up the Chagres River by riverboat and then down into Panama City on mule trains. Runnels sold his transport business in May 1851 and bought hotels at two points on the Chagres River, the villages of Gorgona and Cruces. In 1853, Runnels sold his hotels and launched a new transportation firm. He then tried unsuccessfully to obtain a presidential appointment as U.S. Consul to Panama but instead secured a lucrative position as the US Inspector of Goods in transit across Panama.

As the cross-isthmus traffic volumes grew, banditry became an increasing problem. Gold shipments from California were an especially lucrative target. Frequent robberies were a menace to the railroad and steamship companies and the reputation for danger threatened to drive customers to use alternate routes in Nicaragua and other places. In response, a private police force known as the Isthmus Guard was established under Runnels' command and funded by the railroad and steamship companies. On July 21, 1854, the provincial governor, authorized Runnels and the Isthmus Guard to pursue criminals along the transit route through Panama.

During their first month of operation, Runnels and his Guard arrested 47 men according to a report in the Star and Herald, a leading newspaper in Panama City. A detailed accounting of those captured showed a mixed bag of Americans, local Panamanians, and a few Jamaicans. Most were transported to New York City or Cartagena and a few were imprisoned in a local penal colony.

As a result of Runnels efforts, the Star and Herald wrote that the gangs of robbers had been “entirely uprooted” and assured Panamanian readers that the Guard faithfully carried out their mission as ordered by a legitimate government authority. Despite the newspaper's enthusiastic endorsement, the local population resented the fact that the Guard was a private police force funded by the railroad and led by an American.

For the rest of the year, the transit route saw a marked decline in crime. By December, the acting governor expanded the Guard's authority, giving them authority to conduct night patrols in Panama City. Meanwhile, the Guard was also patrolling the road connecting Panama City with the closest railroad station and keeping it crime-free. In January, 1855, the railroad line was complete and the first railroad engine crossed the Isthmus and arrived in Panama City. A month later, the Guard was decommissioned, its services no longer necessary and its cost a burden that the railroad was eager to be done with.

Runnels also played a small role in the April 1856 "Watermelon Riot", an anti-American riot that began when an American traveler refused to pay for a watermelon slice he had taken from a street vendor. The violence quickly escalated and a mob stormed the railroad station and an American hotel. Runnels was working at the railroad station and waded into the crowd in an attempt to calm them because, as he said, "I spoke Spanish and knew almost all of them." His efforts had little effect and friends among the crowd, fearing for his safety, pulled him out. In the subsequent violence 14 Americans and three Panamanians were killed.

Runnels left Panama shortly after the riot and ended his career in Nicaragua where he served as an American consul.

== Later notoriety ==
For many years afterwards, Runnels was treated as a minor character in most histories of the region. Juan B. Sosa and Enrique J. Arce devoted a short paragraph to the Runnels story in "Compendio de Historia de Panamá", published in 1911 and officially adopted for teaching in Panama's schools. Other historians mentioned Runnels merely as a footnote.

His visibility and notoriety began to change when Horace Bell's "On the Old West Coast: Being Further Reminiscences of a Ranger" was published posthumously in 1930. Bell was the first to write about a mass hanging perpetrated by Runnels and the Isthmus Guard but he neglected to provide any sources for these allegations. One scholar concluded that Bell was a “fabulist” whose “highly embroidered memoirs” are “notorious for their unreliability.”

In 1952, a pot‐boiler entitled "The Golden Road" by Peter Bourne was published. In this fictional account Runnels is depicted as a "true killer" responsible for two mass hangings.

Then it seemed that more reliable evidence had surfaced in 1967 when Joseph L. Schott published "Rails Across Panama", basing it in part on the letters and diary of Runnels's sister, Octavia Charity Marsden. However, the materials were a forgery: Runnels had no sister with that name. When Schott realized his error, he destroyed the documents.

== See also ==
- Panama Canal Railway
- History of Panama (1821–1903)

== Sources ==
- Humphrey, David C. (2015). "The Myth of the Hangman: Ran Runnels, the Isthmus Guard, and the Suppression of Crime in Mid‐Nineteenth‐Century Panama". The Latin Americanist. 59 (4): 3–24. doi:10.1111/tla.12057. S2CID 147188932.
- McGuinness, Aims (2008). Path of Empire : Panama and the California Gold Rush. Ithaca: Cornell University Press. ISBN 9780801445217.
