= Battle of Guantánamo Bay =

Part of the Spanish–American War in 1898

Coordinates: 20.0212°N 75.1137°W

- Part of the Spanish–American War
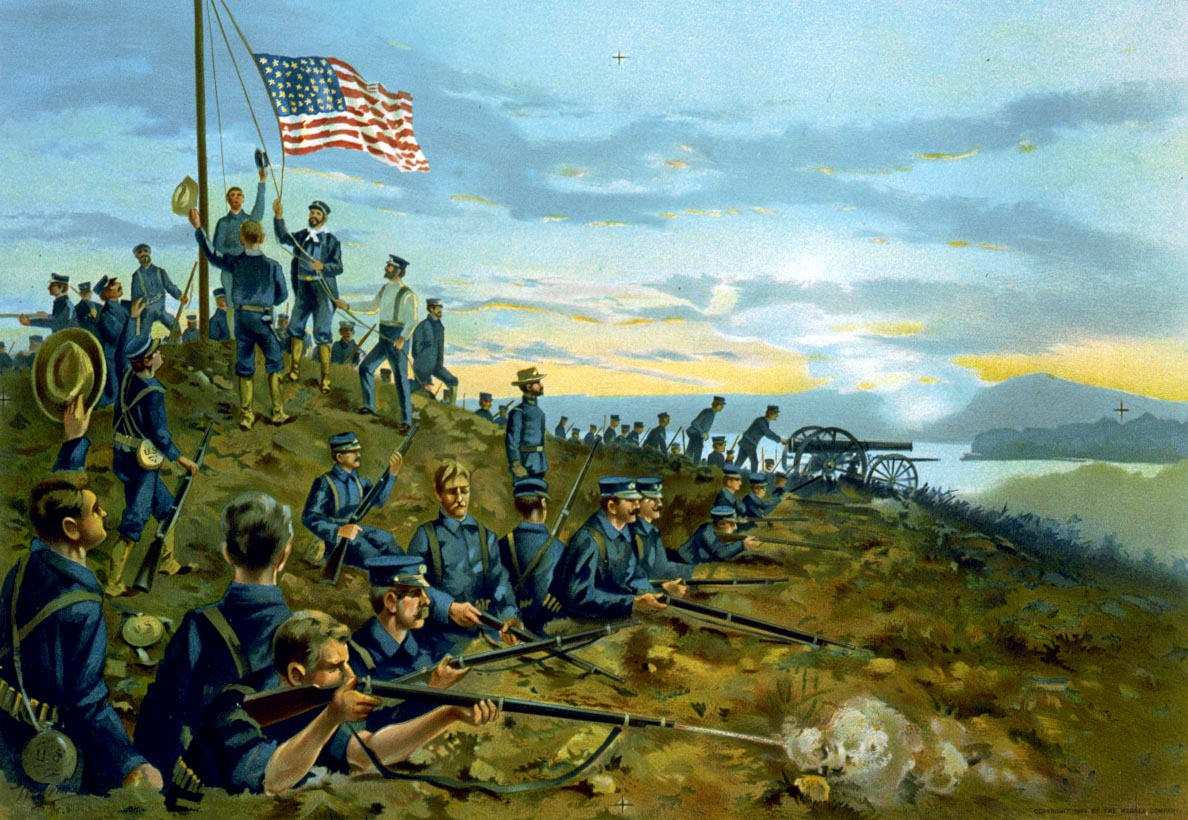
- First hoisting of the Stars and Stripes by the US Marines on Cuban soil, June 11, 1898, Unknown author
Date	6–10 June 1898
Location	Guantánamo Bay, Cuba
Result	American-Cuban victory

Belligerents
United States; Cuban rebels	Spain

Commanders and leaders
Bowman McCalla	Félix Pareja Mesa

Strength
923; 1 unprotected cruiser 2 auxiliary cruisers 1 gunboat 1 steamship	5,000; 2 gunboats

Casualties and losses
29 killed and wounded 1 unprotected cruiser damaged	208 killed and wounded 18 captured 2 gunboats damaged

The Battle of Guantánamo Bay was fought from June 6 to June 14, 1898, during the Spanish–American War, when American and Cuban forces seized the strategically and commercially important harbor of Guantánamo Bay, Cuba. Capturing the bay from the Spanish forces was instrumental in the following Battle of Santiago de Cuba and the subsequent invasion of Puerto Rico. Although overshadowed by the land and sea battles at Santiago, the establishment of the United States naval base at Guantánamo Bay and the rout of defending Spanish troops by American and Cuban forces was important in the final Spanish defeat.

== Background ==
Cuba had been in rebellion against Spain since 1895. Soon after the rebellion began, two insurgent leaders – José Martí and General Máximo Gómez – had landed at the beach of Cajobabo, between Guantánamo Bay and Cape Maisí, but after three years of fighting throughout the island, the rebels had only been successful in two provinces – Oriente and Camagüey.

Following the explosion of the battleship USS Maine in Havana Harbor in February 1898, the U.S. declared war on Spain in support of the Cuban insurgents. Havana Harbor was blockaded, and by the end of May the Spanish fleet was bottled up in Santiago Bay, 40 mi (35 nmi; 64 km) west of Guantánamo Bay, by Rear Admiral William T. Sampson. In the U.S., an army expeditionary force was rapidly being readied at the same time for action in Cuba. Thus, America was allied with the Cuban insurgents. Guantánamo Bay had a measure of commercial importance because of the sugar port of Caimanera on the western shore of the inner bay, some five statute miles (8 km) from the sea.

=== Spanish positions ===
Despite the nominal offensive position of the insurgents in the vicinity of Guantánamo Bay, Spanish regulars and guerrillas held Guantánamo City, the port of Caimanera and the railroad connecting the two cities, the large sugar mills, and other outlying strong points. The Guantánamo garrison consisted of some 5,000 men under the command of General Felix Pareja. A Spanish blockhouse stood on the hill overlooking the village on Fisherman's Point near the entrance to the bay, and a fort on Cayo del Toro commanded the relatively narrow channel leading from outer to inner bay. The Spanish gunboat Sandoval was based at Caimanera on the inner bay, and a string of blockhouses defended the railroad to Guantánamo City, 14 mi (23 km) inland.

The Cuban insurgents maintained coastal outposts from the mouth of the Yateras River, east of the bay, to a point 15 mi (24 km) west of Santiago, and were in undisputed possession of the western point at the entrance to the bay.

== Battle ==
=== Naval battle of Guantánamo Bay ===
The first successful U.S. foray against Guantánamo Bay occurred on 6 June, with the arrival of the unprotected cruiser USS Marblehead, captained by Commander Bowman H. McCalla, and the auxiliary cruisers USS St. Louis and Yankee, commanded by Willard H. Brownson. Commander McCalla had been detached by Admiral Sampson from the blockading fleet at Santiago and ordered to reconnoiter the bay for a naval base. The captain of St. Louis was to cut the cables which had their terminus in a small station on Fisherman's Point, and connected Cuba with Haiti and the outside world.

On a previous occasion, St. Louis, on a similar mission, had been driven from the bay by the Spanish gunboat Sandoval. This time, as the three warships came into the bay at dawn, Spanish soldiers clustered about the blockhouse on the hill known today as McCalla Hill. The blockhouse and the village were speedily cleared by fire from Marblehead's six-pounder gun, along with a single 5 in (130 mm) shell. The Spanish gunboats Alvarado and Sandoval came down the channel from Caimanera to meet the attack but retired precipitately on discovering the caliber of guns against them. The one cannon of the fort on Cayo del Toro opened fire on Marblehead without effect until it was silenced.

The telegraph cables leading east to Cap-Haïtien, west to Santiago, and the small cable in the bay connecting Caimanera and Guantánamo City with Cap-Haïtien were all successfully cut, and from 7 June to 5 July the town of Guantánamo had no communication with the outside world.

Upon returning to the blockading fleet from the reconnaissance, Marblehead carried two Cuban officers who had been brought off to the ship from Leeward Point (the western side) of Guantánamo Bay. They had been sent to Admiral Sampson by General Calixto García (the same who figured with U.S. Lieutenant Rowan in "A Message to Garcia") to report that the Cuban forces, whose outposts occupied positions on the coast from the mouth of the Yateras to a point 15 mi (24 km) west of Santiago were at the disposition of the U.S. Commander-in-Chief. Commander McCalla thereafter maintained close liaison with General Pedro Pérez, commanding the Cuban forces around Guantánamo City, through the latter's Chief of Staff, Colonel Vieta, and thus received valuable advice and assistance.

=== Marine assault landing ===
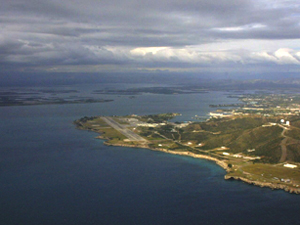
Aerial view of Guantánamo Bay

With the decision to establish a base at Guantánamo Bay, the First Battalion of Marines, consisting of six companies of around 650 men (four infantry and one artillery company), was ordered to proceed in the converted transport USS Panther, and join the fleet off Santiago. The First Battalion, under the command of Lt. Col. Robert W. Huntington USMC, had been undergoing battalion exercises while awaiting orders at Key West. USS Panther reached Santiago on 9 June 1898. That same day, in advance of the battalion landing, Navy Commander Bowman H. McCalla of the USS Marblehead, the officer in command of the landings, approved a camp site selected for the Marines by Lt. Col. Huntington. The site selected was a flat ridge on top of a hill, above the village on Fisherman's Point, and designated Camp McCalla. In addition to an artillery company equipped with a battery of four 3-inch rapid-firing artillery pieces and two Model 1895 Colt–Browning machine guns, each marine was equipped with the Navy's new rapid-firing magazine rifle, the Model 1895 Lee Navy. Both the Colt machine gun and the Lee rifles used a new high-velocity smokeless powder cartridge, the 6 mm Lee Navy.

The Marine battalion landed unopposed on 10 June with four of its six companies, leaving A company and F company (the artillery company) aboard to unload the ship, as Commander Reiter, the captain of the Panther, had refused to authorize the use of ship's personnel for unloading duties. Reiter also refused to permit the unloading of the remainder of the Marines' small arms ammunition, claiming that it was needed as ship's ballast. Lt. Col. Huntington sought assistance from Commander McCalla, who ordered Reiter to release the Marines' ammunition at once: "Sir, break out immediately and land with the crew of Panther, 50,000 rounds of 6-mm. ammunition," McCalla ordered. "In the future, do not require Colonel Huntington to break out or land his stores with members of his command. Use your own officers and men for this purpose, and supply the Commanding Officer of Marines promptly with anything he may desire."

The Marines burned crude huts of the village and the remains of the blockhouse with all their contents to avoid the possibility of yellow fever. The Spanish had fled in such a hurry that clothing, money, jewelry and weapons had been left behind. The battalion raised the American flag, the first U.S. military unit to do so on Cuban soil, and sent out detachments for outpost duty.

Lt. Col. Huntington ordered Company C to occupy a 150-ft tall hill located some distance from the main Marine position, and which could not be supported by the main body at Camp McCalla. Two forward outposts were established, one at a road junction located several hundred yards ahead of the camp and known as the "Crossroads", and one called "The Bridge" placed across a road a mile and a half from the American camp, where Spanish forces bringing artillery from Caimanera were expected. With the sea at their backs, a lack of mutual support between outposts, and the thorny scrub and cacti of the arid hills stretching in a dense tangle before them, the Marines had a less-than-ideal tactical position. Commander McCalla pointed out to Lt. Col. Huntington that his outposts were too far forward and could not be seen or supported in the dense undergrowth between the outposts and the main camp. Three of the companies stacked arms and returned to the ship to help with unloading operations. Shortly after sundown, the Marines had their first meal of coffee and hardtack. Soon afterwards the first alarm came. Voices were heard and lights seen in the thicket, but no attack came that night. Spanish forces defending the area were desperately short of food, and delayed attacking until the Marines had completed unloading their stores in hopes of seizing the American supplies.

By daybreak, the Marines had completed unloading their stores and equipment, though the artillery pieces and their ammunition were left aboard ship. The remaining companies of the battalion came ashore, and Company C was withdrawn from its isolated hill outpost. The only sound in the thickets was the cooing of mourning doves, a sound which Marines would later learn was a favorite signal call used by Spanish loyalist guerrilla forces.

Lt. Col. Huntington was joined in the afternoon by Colonel Laborde of the Cuban army, who for several days had been with Commander McCalla as pilot on Marblehead, and now had been sent ashore to assist the Marines and provide intelligence about the enemy.

Laborde reported the major Spanish force in the area had its headquarters at the "Well of Cuzco", 2 mi (3.2 km) southeast of Fisherman's Point. The well provided the only fresh water in the area. This occupying force of about 500 soldiers and guerrillas, joined by the troops driven from the blockhouse on the bay, constituted the gravest threat to the U.S. base of operations. Laborde noted that seizing Cuzco Well and destroying it would inevitably force Spanish forces to retreat all the way to Ciudad Guantánamo (Guantánamo City).

As they spoke, firing began in the thicket in front of their position. Lt. Col. Huntington led most of his command forward. However, the thorny tangle of trees, underbrush, and cactus forced him to proceed with only one company.

=== Battle of Camp McCalla ===
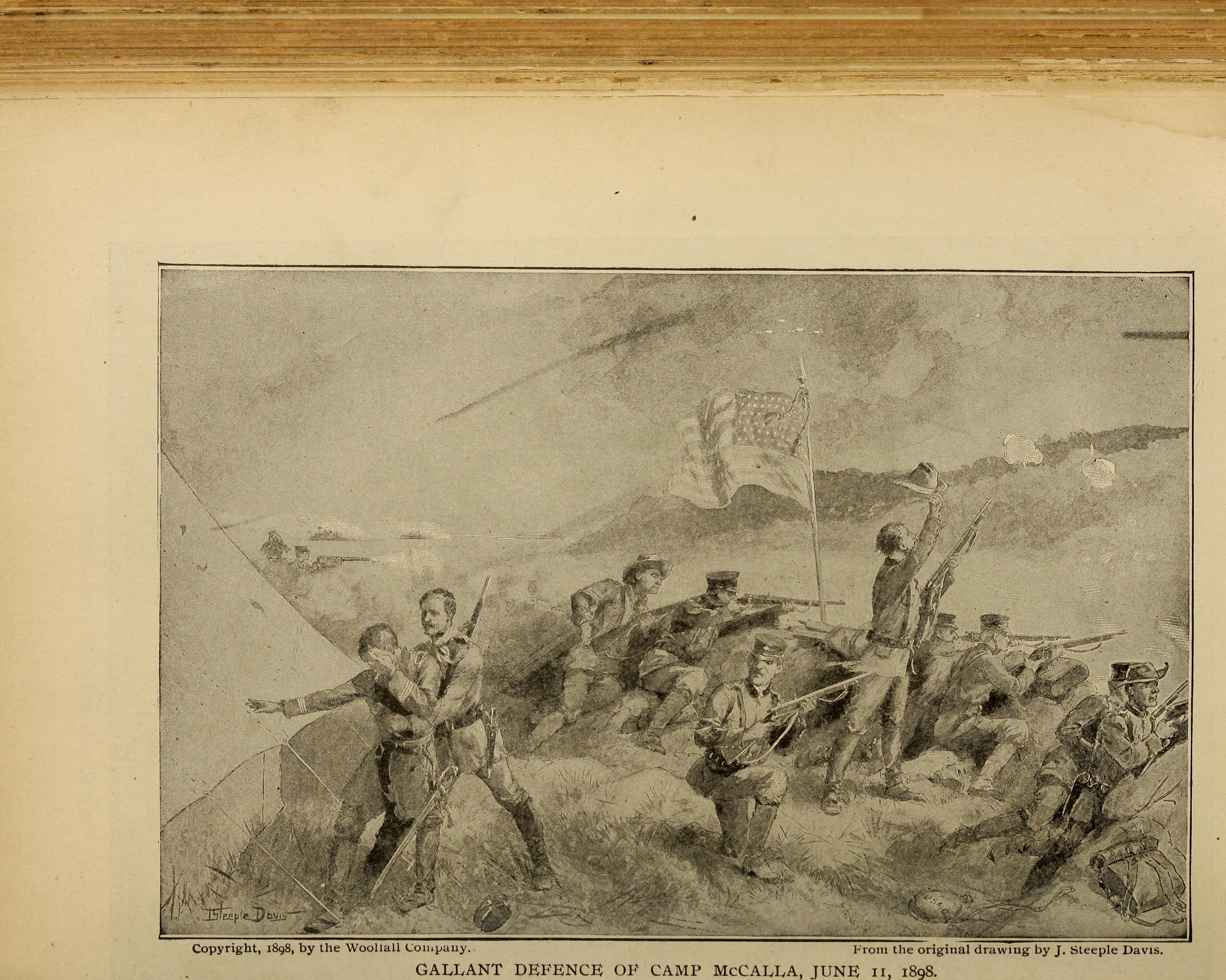
Gallant defense of Camp McCalla, June 11

Although Huntington was now assured of naval gunfire support, Camp McCalla was tactically unsound. No attack had been expected, so no trenches were dug. The Marines' artillery had not even been sent ashore. Located on the sands of the open beach, the Marine campsite proved an ideal target for snipers concealed in the brush.

At daybreak (05:00) on Saturday, 11 June, Spanish guerrillas opened fire on the Marines at Camp McCalla from the surrounding brush. Firing a fusillade from their rapid-firing Mauser rifles, the guerrillas advanced towards the camp. After heavy fighting, and supported by the reserve company (Company C) the Marines drove the enemy back into the bush, pursuing the enemy until the chase was abandoned at dark. Two pickets on outpost duty, Privates William Dumphy and James McColgan, who were posted as an early-warning patrol 100 yards ahead of the "Crossroads" forward outpost were later found dead, shot and cut numerous times in the face and body. Their weapons, shoes, belts, and part of their clothing had been taken.

This was the beginning of what Huntington's executive officer, Major Henry Clay Cochrane, later called "its 100 hours of fighting". At Camp McCalla, the Marines dug in and began firing at the concealed Spaniards, aided by three 3-inch field pieces and two additional 6 mm Colt–Browning machine guns which had been landed on 12 June by the USS Texas. Gunfire from Marblehead passed overhead and impacted in the nearby hills. Wearing large palm leaves tied to their uniforms for camouflage, and firing smokeless powder cartridges, the Spanish forces were difficult to locate as they moved from bush to bush in the dense undergrowth.

On the evening of 12 June, enemy forces came within fifty yards of Camp McCalla, and a desperate firefight began. Marines responded with their Lee straight-pull rifles, along with machine gun and artillery fire from the Marine 3-inch field pieces. Perhaps deterred by the intense artillery and machine gun fire, the Spanish did not attempt to overrun the camp. Acting Assistant Surgeon John Blair Gibbs and Sergeant Charles H. Smith were both killed in this exchange of fire. Marines later found several blood trails, but no bodies, as the guerrillas removed their wounded and dead to conceal their casualty figures.

The next day, the Marines were reinforced by about 60 Cubans under Lieutenant Colonel Enrique Thomas. The Cubans had been equipped with rifles and white duck sailor uniforms by Commander McCalla from the USS Marblehead. Familiar with guerrilla tactics, the Cuban insurgents deployed in pairs in front of the camp, burning the brush and undergrowth as they advanced, thus denying to the enemy of cover. The Marblehead, which had provided shore bombardment on several occasions, steamed down the coast and shelled the well at Cuzco. Nevertheless, the Spanish attack was resumed at dusk, and two more Marines—acting Sergeant Major Henry Good and Private Goode Taurman—were killed.

By nightfall on 13 June, the Marines were exhausted. They had not slept nor rested for 100 hours. Relief or reinforcements was impossible, since U.S. Army troops had yet to leave the U.S. The fighting continued for two more days.

=== Battle of Cuzco Well ===
Lt Col. Thomas of the Cuban rebel forces advised Colonel Huntington to attack the Spanish garrison at Cuzco Well, consisting of four companies of Spanish infantry and two companies of loyalist guerrilla forces totaling some 500 men. By capturing and destroying the only nearby source of fresh water, it was hoped that the defending Spanish forces would be forced to leave the area. Commander McCalla approved the plans, and the attack was scheduled for 08:00 the next day.

Marine companies C and D, about 160 men, under Captain George F. Elliott, a future Commandant of the Marine Corps, joined by the fifty Cubans under Lt. Col. Thomas, would approach Cuzco along the cliffs by the sea. A smaller Marine force would advance by an inland valley, holding a picket line for the main force, with men in reserve to assist if necessary. The gunboat USS Dolphin was assigned to support the attack from sea.

The day was already hot when the combined U.S.-Cuban force began its march on 14 June. Colonel Laborde guided the main force, and a Cuban scout named Polycarpio guided a smaller force led by 2nd Lt. Magill. The march was slowed by rough terrain, vicious undergrowth, and increasing heat; at one point, the captains of Companies C and D in the main column had fallen behind owing to heat exhaustion. It was almost 11:00 when the main force reached the steep, horseshoe-shaped hill around Cuzco valley; the commanders of Companies C and D rejoined their units fifteen minutes later.

About the same time, the Cubans, who were marching ahead of the Marine companies, were spotted by the enemy. A race for the crest of the hill began. The Marines and the Cubans reached the summit first, under heavy fire from the Spanish and guerrillas. The smaller Marine force approached on the double, using their 6 mm (0.236-inch) Lee rifles to pour a deadly crossfire on the enemy flank. Three of the four M1895 Colt–Browning machine guns accompanying the Marines were used by Company C in the fighting. According to Pvt. John Clifford of Company D, the machine guns were instrumental in supporting the Marine assault. This was the first known tactical use of machine gun fire for mobile fire support in offensive combat.

The light weight of the Marines' new 6mm Lee cartridge proved to be of considerable benefit, allowing each Marine and machine gun crew to transport large amounts of ammunition over the mountainous, jungled terrain. Midway through the battle, the Cuban rebel forces ran out of 6 mm cartridges, and were resupplied with an additional six clips (30 cartridges) from the belts of individual Marines, yet none of the Americans ran short of ammunition, despite firing some sixty shots apiece in the battle.

During this portion of the fighting, Captain Elliott had requested that Dolphin provide fire support to the Marines by shelling the Spanish blockhouse and nearby positions with her naval guns. Through a miscommunication of signals, however, the gunboat began unknowingly dropping shells in the direct path of a small force of fifty marines and ten Cuban irregulars led by 2nd Lt. Magill, who was attempting to flank the Spanish position and potentially cut off any avenue of retreat. Affixing his handkerchief to a long stick and braving the Spanish fire, Sergeant John H. Quick took up an exposed position on the ridge to immediately wigwag a flag signal to Dolphin to adjust her gunfire. War Correspondent Stephen Crane, who had accompanied the Marines, later described the scene in his war tale "Marines Signaling Under Fire at Guantanamo":

"Sergeant Quick arose, and announced that he was a signalman. He produced from somewhere a blue polka-dot neckerchief as large as a quilt. He tied it on a long, crooked stick. Then he went to the top of the ridge, and turning his back to the Spanish fire, began to signal to the Dolphin. Again we gave a man sole possession of a particular part of the ridge. We didn't want it. He could have it and welcome. If the young sergeant had had the smallpox, the cholera, and the yellow fever, we could not have slid out with more celerity.

As men have said often, it seemed as if there was in this war a God of Battles who held His mighty hand before the Americans. As I looked at Sergeant Quick wig-wagging there against the sky, I would not have given a tin tobacco-tag for his life. Escape for him seemed impossible. It seemed absurd to hope that he would not be hit; I only hoped that he would be hit just a little, in the arm, the shoulder, or the leg.

I watched his face, and it was as grave and serene as that of a man writing in his own library. He was the very embodiment of tranquillity in occupation. He stood there amid the animal-like babble of the Cubans, the crack of rifles, and the whistling snarl of the bullets, and wig-wagged whatever he had to wig-wag without heeding anything but his business. There was not a single trace of nervousness or haste.

To say the least, a fight at close range is absorbing as a spectacle. No man wants to take his eyes from it until that time comes when he makes up his mind to run away. To deliberately stand up and turn your back to a battle is in itself hard work. To deliberately stand up and turn your back to a battle and hear immediate evidences of the boundless enthusiasm with which a large company of the enemy shoot at you from an adjacent thicket is, to my mind at least, a very great feat. One need not dwell upon the detail of keeping the mind carefully upon a slow spelling of an important code message.

I saw Quick betray only one sign of emotion. As he swung his clumsy flag to and fro, an end of it once caught on a cactus pillar, and he looked sharply over his shoulder to see what had it. He gave the flag an impatient jerk. He looked annoyed."

When Sergeant Quick finished this message, the ship answered. Quick then picked up his Lee rifle and resumed his place on the firing line. For his gallant and selfless conduct during this action, Quick would later receive the Medal of Honor.

Dolphin shifted her fire onto the enemy camp and blockhouse, and by 14:00, the Spanish had broken and fled the blockhouse. Unfortunately, 2nd Lt. Magill's men were delayed sufficiently to prevent them from cutting off a Spanish retreat, though his men did capture the Spanish signaling station and its heliograph equipment. As the Spanish forces withdrew through a gully on the other side of the valley, Marines opened fire at a distance of 1,200 yards, firing volley after volley. The Spanish were unable to accurately return fire, allowing Marine Company B and the Cuban rebels to close the distance, firing as they advanced. The Spanish first attempted to concentrate their fires on the Cubans and managed to kill two of them, but were forced back by Marine rifle fire once again, at which point the remaining enemy, which up to that point had been withdrawing in good order, broke and scattered.

=== Spanish retreat ===
By 15:30, the enemy had abandoned the battlefield, and all firing had ceased. Most of the Spanish had escaped, but a lieutenant and 17 enlisted men were captured, and the enemy suffered casualties of 60 killed and 150 wounded. They had left behind 30 modern 7mm Mauser rifles and ammunition. Two Marines and two Cuban rebels had been wounded, and two Cuban rebels killed, who were buried where they fell. The most serious casualties suffered by the Marines were from heat exhaustion, which disabled one officer and 22 men. Gunboat Dolphin took these aboard after the fighting was over for the trip back to Camp McCalla. The Spanish headquarters building (blockhouse) was burned, and the freshwater well at Cuzco was destroyed, thus ending its immediate usefulness, including to the Marines, whose officers would not let them drink from it prior to its destruction. Water was eventually brought up from the USS Dolphin after a wait of two hours.

Spanish forces retreated in small groups of stragglers to Guantánamo, via Cayo del Toro and Caimanera. Apparently expecting the U.S. forces to follow up the victory, they fortified Dos Caminos, a small settlement at the crossing of two roads, and added several blockhouses to the number already erected on the rail line. The Spanish soldiers were apparently impressed by Marine firepower; upon arrival at Ciudad Guantánamo (Guantánamo City), the surviving members of the Cuzco Well garrison informed General Pareja that they had been attacked by 10,000 Americans.

Camp McCalla saw no further attacks by Spanish or guerilla forces, and was disestablished on August 5, 1898.

Meanwhile, attention was soon focused on other areas of the bay. The Spanish were adding to their earthworks on Cayo del Toro, where they had three bronze 6.4 in (160 mm) guns and a modern 3.5 in (89 mm) Krupp gun. At Caimanera, on the bluff south of the village, were mounted three more of the 6.4 in (160 mm) guns, and the small gunboat Sandoval had a battery of one six-pounder and an automatic one-pounder Maxim gun.

== Aftermath ==
=== Bombardment of Fort Toro ===
Admiral Sampson decided to shell the fort of Cayo del Toro, and on 16 June he sent USS Texas and Yankee to join with USS Marblehead in this plan. Fire from the three ships temporarily dismounted two of the enemy's big guns, destroyed the buildings on the Cay, and drove the troops from all guns and trenches. Their combined firepower had reduced the Spanish fort to impotency within 15 minutes of initially engaging it. One enemy shell landed near the bow of the Marblehead, sinking within ten yards of the ship, but no hits were scored.

As the Americans proceeded slowly, a lookout on Marblehead reported that the starboard propeller was foul of a buoy. The engine was stopped, and the propeller was cleared of the "buoy", which turned out to be a contact mine. The mine was successfully disarmed. Afterward, it was learned that the ships had passed through a field of 18 such mines, or torpedoes, on the trip up the bay and through the same field on the return trip, without injury of any kind. A few days after the attack on Cayo del Toro, the mine field was thoroughly explored, and 14 mines were recovered. Their failure to explode on contact was attributed to mechanical faults, plus a healthy growth of barnacles on the contact levers.

The minesweeping operation, carried out without specialized equipment, involved two steam launches and two whaleboats from Marblehead and Dolphin. A launch and whaleboat side by side, connected to the other launch and whaleboat by a rope with a chain drag in the center, swept the channel. When the drag met an obstruction, the boats came together and crossed the ends of the drag. The boats were then hauled carefully up to the mine, which was brought to the surface and disarmed. Twice the drag brought up two mines together.

While sweeping for mines, the boats had been fired on from Hicacal Beach, where 250 Spanish infantry were posted to guard the mine field. It was determined to rout the last enemy force remaining in the vicinity of the bay, and on 25 June Lt. Col. Huntington led two companies of Marines and 40 Cubans in an amphibious assault on Hicacal Beach. It proved to be a bloodless encounter, since the Spanish had left a day or two earlier.

=== Santiago ===
With Guantánamo Bay successfully occupied, US interest centered on operations at Santiago. An American expeditionary force of 17,000 officers and men under Major General William R. Shafter was landed east of the city at the small ports of Daiquirí and Siboney between 22 and 25 June, without opposition. A week later, on 1 July, the historic battles of El Caney and San Juan Hill ended in victory for U.S. forces, opening up the approaches to Santiago itself. On the morning of 3 July, a demand was sent to the Spanish commander, General Arsenio Linares, to surrender or suffer bombardment of the city as an alternative. On the same morning, the Spanish fleet under Admiral Pascual Cervera sallied forth from Santiago Bay, only to meet with complete destruction at the hands of the U.S. fleet. Major Spanish resistance at Santiago was at an end, although it was not until 15 July that a preliminary agreement was signed. U.S. forces occupied the city on 17 July.

The 7,000 Spanish troops at the city of Guantánamo – only 40 mi (64 km) away – did not march to the aid of Linares' besieged army, because prior to the cutting of his communications, General Pareja had been directed by his superiors to hold the city of Guantánamo at all costs. This was so ordered because the Spanish feared that the Guantánamo valley might be used as an invasion route by U.S. forces, as the English had once used it to advance on Santiago. After the Navy cut the cables and established a base at Guantánamo Bay, General Pareja remained in complete ignorance concerning the course of the war because the Cuban insurgents maintained such a tight ring about the city that not one messenger got through their lines. Fifteen were caught and executed as spies. None of General Linares' frantic requests for aid reached Pareja.

The threat posed by U.S. Naval forces and a battalion of Marines at Guantánamo Bay, plus the stranglehold on land communications by 1,000 Cuban insurgents, effectively pinned down an army of 7,000 men which might have changed the outcome of the fighting at Santiago. Less than a week after the surrender of Santiago, the base at Guantánamo Bay was used to launch the invasion of Puerto Rico, 500 mi (800 km) to the east. Three thousand five hundred troops under General Miles sailed from the Bay on 21 July. This was the last important event in the Spanish–American War phase of Guantánamo Bay; on August 12, the war ended with the signing of the peace protocol and an armistice. The new U.S. Naval Base was not formalized by lease agreement between the U.S. and Cuba until five years later, when in 1903 it was acquired as a "coaling and Naval station", but its worth was already proven.

Lt. Col. Huntington's Marine First Battalion, which had reembarked aboard the USS Resolute during the siege and surrender of Santiago, sailed for the United States, and after a stop at New York, arrived at Portsmouth Harbor, disembarking her marines on the evening of 24 August 1898.

== See also ==
- Platt Amendment
- Timeline of Guantánamo Bay
- Battles of the Spanish–American War
- Henry Clay Cochrane
