= Panama crisis of 1885 =

US military intervention in a rebellion in Panama

Panama Crisis of 1885
- Part of the Colombian Civil War (1884–1885)
- Disembarking at Aspinwall (Harper's Weekly, 30 May 1885)
Date	7 April – 30 April 1885
Location	Isthmus of Panama, Colombia
Result	Colombian diplomatic victory Rebellion suppressed U.S. and Chilean forces withdrawn

Belligerents
Panamanian Rebels; United States	Colombia; Chile

Commanders and leaders
(United States) James E. Jouett (United States) Bowman H. McCalla	(Colombia) Rafael Núñez (Chile) Juan López Lermanda

The Panama Crisis of 1885 was an intervention by the United States during a rebellion in Panama, at the time part of Colombia, and an ensuing show of force by Chile in support of the Colombian government.

== Background ==
The 1846 Mallarino–Bidlack Treaty, signed by the Republic of New Granada (predecessor to Colombia) and the United States, obligated the United States to maintain "neutrality" in the Colombian state of Panama in exchange for transit rights across the isthmus.

Chile's influence in the region increased following its victory in the War of the Pacific. In this war, Chile defeated Bolivia and Peru and gained large swathes of territory from both, removing Bolivia's access to the sea. U.S. sympathies lay with Bolivia and Peru, and Chile rejected American attempts to mediate. A Peruvian attempt to cede a naval base to the U.S. in Chimbote Bay in 1881 was blocked when Chile, learning of the deal, sent marines to occupy Chimbote.

== Panama Crisis ==
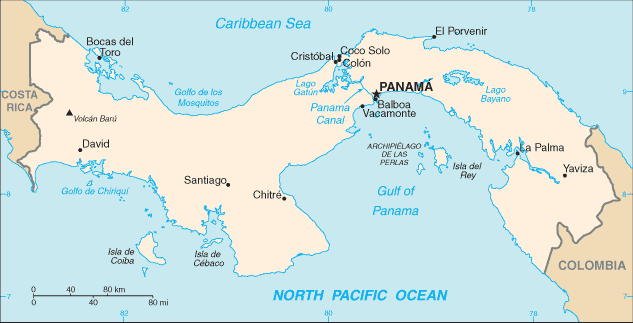
Isthmus of Panama

In March 1885, Colombia thinned its military presence in Panama by sending troops who had been stationed there to fight rebels in Cartagena as part of the Colombian Civil War (1884–1885). These favourable conditions prompted an insurgency in Panama.

The United States Navy was sent to keep order, invoking its obligations under the 1846 treaty. The North Atlantic Squadron, commanded by Rear Admiral James E. Jouett, was ordered to deploy to Panama with orders to protect American lives and property and to ensure free transit across the isthmus, while respecting Colombian sovereignty. A battalion of 234 marines was organized by Major Charles Heywood, and these were eventually joined by another two battalions, under Heywood's overall command as the head of a provisional Marine brigade. It was the first time the United States Marine Corps assembled a brigade-level formation. Along with Heywood was another future Commandant of the Marine Corps, then-First Lieutenant George F. Elliott. The landing force was under the overall command of Navy Commander Bowman H. McCalla.

On 7 April, the screw sloop USS Shenandoah arrived in Panama City. Three days later, other American ships started arriving in Colón, Panama. On 27 April, a force of marines landed in Panama City to help suppress rebels who had taken over the city after local troops moved out to deal with a revolt in Colón. The next day, federal troops from Colombia arrived from Buenaventura, Colombia's nearest Pacific port. By this time, there was also a small force of the National Army of Colombia supported by a strong contingent of American troops in Colón.

A halt on the Panama Railroad (Harper's Weekly, 30 May 1885)

In response to the American intervention, Chile sent the protected cruiser Esmeralda to Panama City, arriving on 28 April. The Esmeralda's captain was ordered to stop by any means an eventual annexation of Panama by the United States. According to a U.S. publication in August 1885, right after the Panama events, "[The Esmeralda] could destroy our whole navy, ship by ship and never be touched once." By the time the Esmeralda arrived in Panama, however, the conflict had already been resolved, as the United States withdrew and the Colombian government retook control of the city on 30 April.

== Aftermath ==
Commander Bowman McCalla submitted a report to the United States Secretary of the Navy on the performance of the Marines during the expedition. He criticized them for their lack of training in land warfare, especially in tactics and their handling of machine guns and artillery, and concluded that they spent too much time in barracks when they could be training. McCalla proposed having annual war games with the fleet and the Army to prepare the Marines for expeditionary operations. These changes were rejected at the time by the Commandant of the Marine Corps, Charles Grymes McCawley, who held the view that the Marines must prioritize the limited duties of providing security aboard ships and at naval bases rather than landing operations. For the rest of the 1880s and 1890s, up until the Spanish–American War, McCawley and his successor Charles Heywood continued to maintain these as the key missions of the Corps, believing that if the expeditionary role was developed, the branch risked being absorbed into the Army.

== See also ==
- Burning of Colón
- Bowman H. McCalla
- History of Panama (1821–1903)
- USS Galena (1880)
