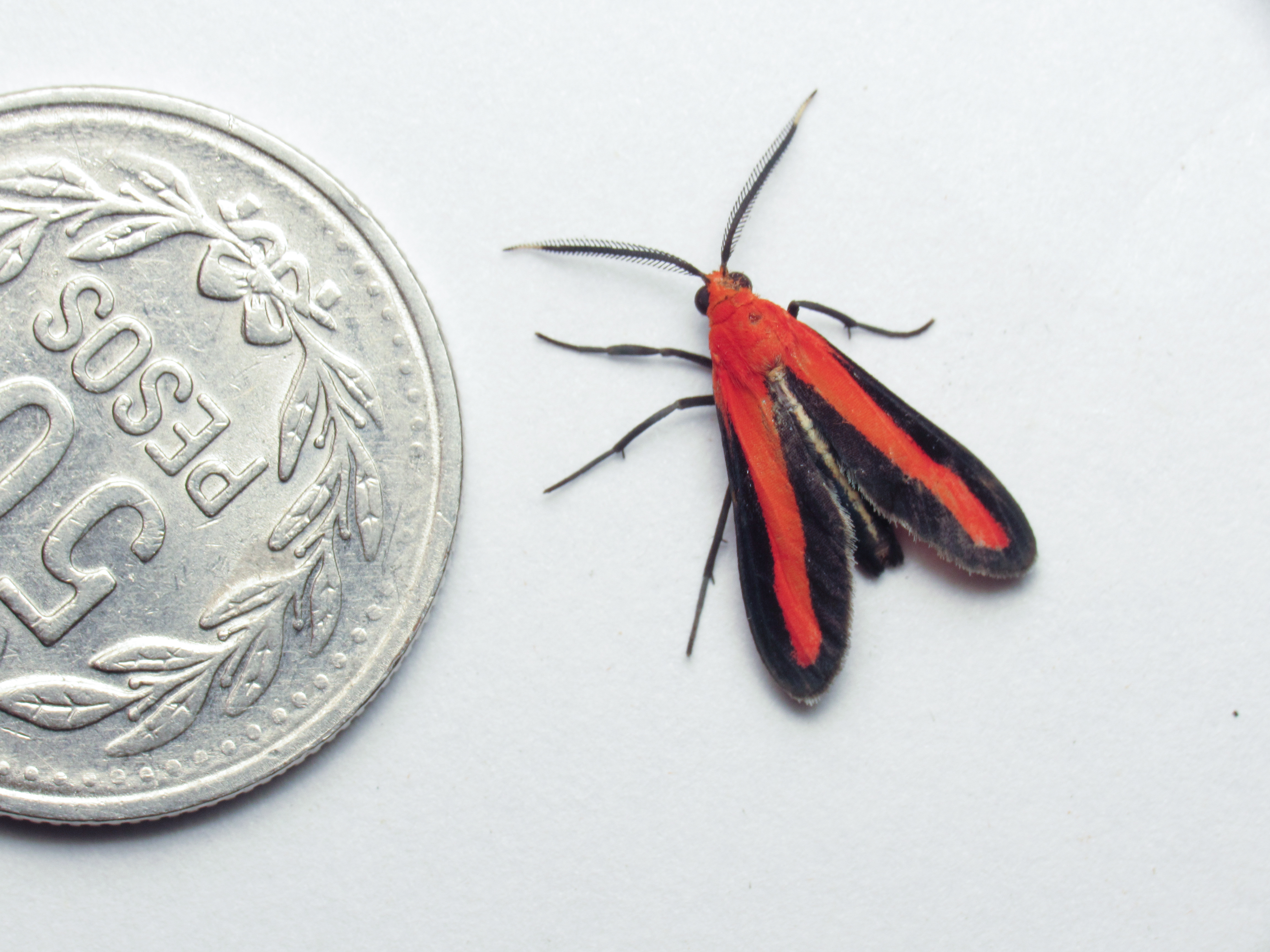

Scientific classification
- Kingdom: Animalia
- Phylum: Arthropoda
- Class: Insecta
- Order: Lepidoptera
- Superfamily: Noctuoidea
- Family: Erebidae
- Subfamily: Arctiinae
- Genus: Tipulodes
- Species: T. annae

Binomial name
- Tipulodes annae Przybylowicz, 2003

= Tipulodes annae =

Species of moth

Tipulodes annae is a species of moth described by Lukasz Przybylowicz in 2003.

The species was named in honor to Lukasz Przybylowicz's wife, Anna. It is characterized by the red color present in its head and patagia, which can differentiate it from the other two Tipulodes species.

This species is distributed in lowlands and some mountainous areas from Colombia and Panama.

== Distribution ==
The species is known from Colombia and Panama. In Colombia, the species can be found in the Andean, Magdalena valley and Choco region. In Panama, the species can be found in the Darien region. This is the only species of Tipulodes that inhabits Central America, and also seems to be the only Tipulodes species with a trans-Andean distribution.
