= USS McCalla =

Two ships of the United States Navy have been named USS McCalla for Bowman H. McCalla.

- USS McCalla (DD-253) was a Clemson-class destroyer, commissioned in 1919 and transferred to the Royal Navy as HMS Stanley in 1940. This ship was sunk in 1941.
- USS McCalla (DD-488) was a Gleaves-class destroyer commissioned in 1942 and transferred to the Turkish Navy as TCG Giresun (D‑345) in 1949. This ship was scrapped in 1973.
