= Crucero Express =

Former ferry service across the Darién Gap

The Crucero Express was the only company to provide ferry service between Panama and Colombia, enjoining the two unconnected segments of the Pan-American Highway (which is broken between North and South America by the Darién Gap). In 1994 the Linea Crucero Express began charting a thrice-weekly course between Colón and Cartagena, but despite its initial popularity rising overhead costs and falling demand forced the company to cease operations in early 1997.

The company utilized a single vessel of approximately ten-thousand tons displacement. It had been constructed in the French shipyard Dubigeín in 1972 and retrofitted in Norway just prior to operations, rechristened with the name Crucera Express. The ship could transport 125 vehicles and with 100 trailers, along with some 600 passengers divided into 240 cabins. For their entertainment during the twenty-hour voyage, the ship also housed jacuzzis, swimming pools, bars, casinos, conference rooms, and ballrooms, making it a cruiseferry. Roundtrip tickets ranged from US$200 to 400 per couple.
