= Darién Gap =

Largely undeveloped area where North America and South America meet

Coordinates: 7.90°N 77.46°W

The Darién Gap at the Colombia–Panama border

Map of the Darién Gap and the break in the Pan-American Highway between Yaviza, Panama, and Turbo, Colombia

The Darién Gap (UK: /ˈdɛər.i.ən, ˈdær.-/, US: /ˌdɛər.i.ˈɛn, ˌdɑːr.-, dɑːr.ˈjɛn/, Spanish: Tapón del Darién [taˈpon del daˈɾjen]) is a remote, roadless, and dangerous area of rainforest on the international border between Colombia and Panama. Stretching across southern Panama's Darién Province and the northern portion of Colombia's Chocó Department, it acts as a natural barrier between North America and South America. Consisting of a large drainage basin, dense rainforest, and mountains, it is known for its remoteness, difficult terrain, and extreme environment, with a reputation as one of the most inhospitable regions in the world. Nevertheless, as the only land bridge between North America and South America, the Darién Gap has historically served as a major route for both humans and wildlife.

The geography of the Darién Gap is highly diverse. The Colombian side is dominated primarily by the river delta of the Atrato River, which creates a flat marshland at least 80 km (50 mi) wide. The Tanela River, which flows toward Atrato, was Hispanicized to Darién by 16th-century European conquistadors. The Serranía del Baudó mountain range extends along Colombia's Pacific coast and into Panama. The Panamanian side, in stark contrast, is a mountainous rainforest, with terrain reaching from 60 m (197 ft) in the valley floors to 1,845 m (6,053 ft) at the tallest peak, Cerro Tacarcuna, in the Serranía del Darién. The Darién Gap is inhabited mostly by the indigenous Embera-Wounaan and Guna peoples; in 1995, it had a reported population of 8,000 among five tribes. The only sizable settlement in the region is La Palma, the capital of Darién Province, with roughly 4,200 residents; other population centers include Yaviza and El Real de Santa María, both on the Panamanian side.

Because of its isolation and harsh geography, the Darién Gap remains largely undeveloped, with most economic activity consisting of small-scale farming, cattle ranching, and lumber. Criminal enterprises such as human and drug trafficking are widespread. There is no road, not even a primitive one, across the Darién. The "Gap" interrupts the Pan-American Highway, which breaks at Yaviza, Panama, and resumes at Turbo, Colombia, roughly 106 km (66 mi) away. Infrastructure development has long been constrained by logistical challenges, financial costs, and environmental concerns; attempts failed in the 1970s and 1990s. Currently, there is no active plan to construct a road through the Gap, although there is discussion of reestablishing a ferry service and building a rail link.

Consequently, travel within and across the Darién Gap is often conducted with small boats or traditional watercraft such as pirogues. Otherwise, hiking remains the only feasible option; however, it is considered strenuous and dangerous. Aside from natural threats such as venomous and deadly wildlife, tropical insects, parasites and diseases, and frequent heavy rains and flash floods, law enforcement and medical support are nonexistent, resulting in rampant violent crime, and causing otherwise minor injuries to potentially become fatal.

Despite its perilous conditions, since the 2010s, the Darién Gap has become one of the heaviest migration routes in the world, with hundreds of thousands of migrants, primarily Haitians and Venezuelans, traversing north to the Mexico–United States border. In 2022, there were 250,000 crossings, compared to only 24,000 in 2019. In 2023, more than 520,000 individuals passed through the gap, more than doubling the previous year's number of crossings.

== Pan-American Highway ==
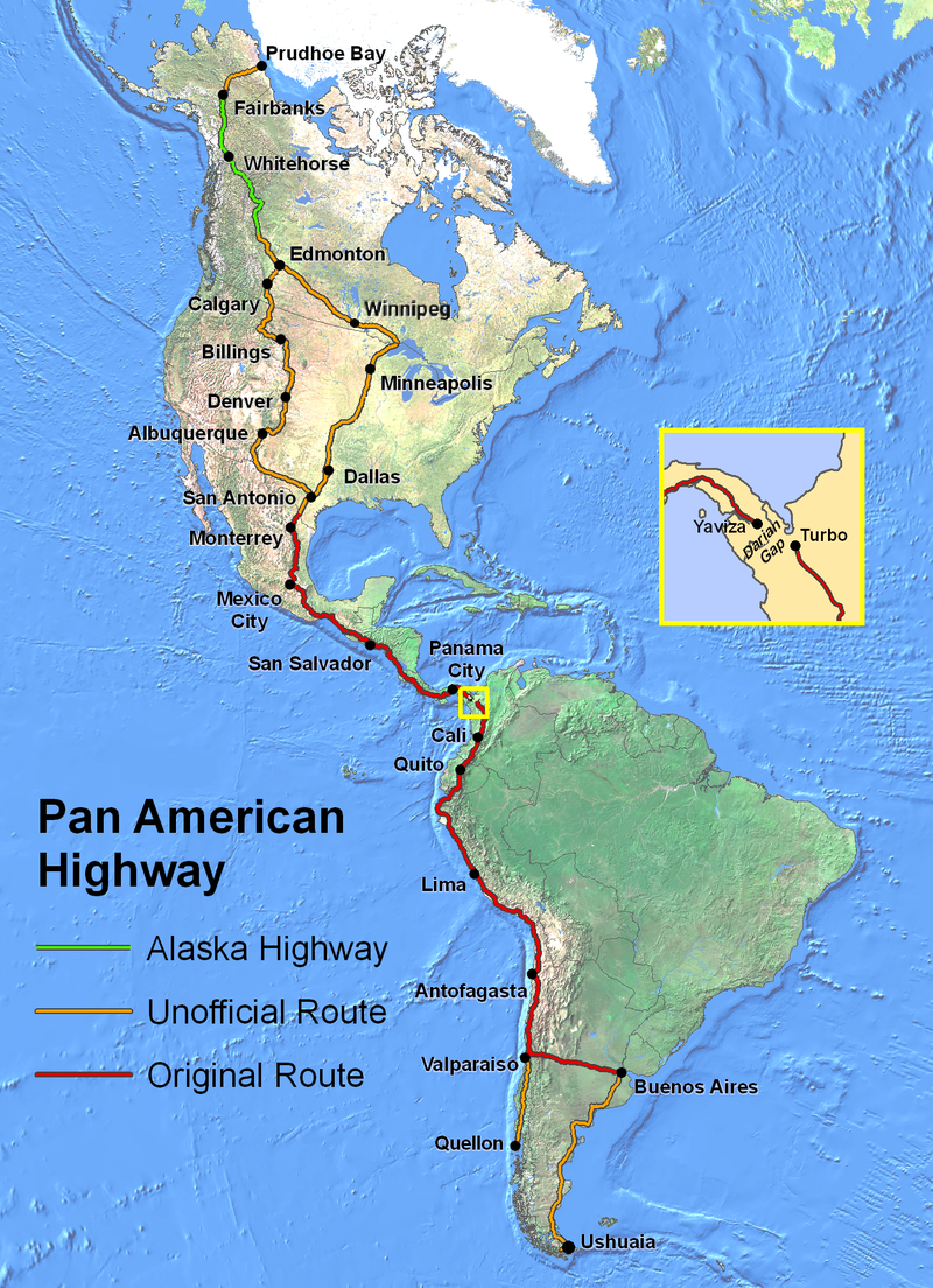
The Pan-American Highway from Prudhoe Bay, United States, to Quellón, Chile, and Ushuaia, Argentina, with official and unofficial routes shown in Mexico and Central and South America

The Pan-American Highway is a system of roads measuring about 30,000 km (19,000 mi) in length that runs the length of North and South America with the sole exception of the Darién Gap. On the South American side, the highway terminates in Turbo, Colombia. On the Panamanian side, the road terminus is the town of Yaviza.

Various environmental organizations, indigenous groups and the United States Department of Agriculture have expressed their opposition to completing the Darién portion of the Pan-American Highway. Reasons for opposition include preventing deforestation, protecting indigenous cultures, and preventing foot-and-mouth disease from entering North America.

Efforts were made for decades to fill this sole gap in the Pan-American Highway. Planning began in 1971 with the help of US funding, but was halted in 1974 after multiple environmentalists expressed serious concerns. US support was further blocked by the US Department of Agriculture in 1978, with the intention of preventing the spread of foot-and-mouth disease. Another effort to build the road began in 1992, but by 1994, a United Nations agency reported that the road and the subsequent development would cause extensive environmental damage. Cited reasons include evidence that the Darién Gap has prevented the spread of diseased cattle into Central and North America, which have not seen foot-and-mouth disease since 1954, and, since at least the 1970s, this has been a substantial factor in preventing a road link through the Darién Gap. The Embera-Wounaan and Guna are among five tribes, comprising 8,000 people, who have expressed concern that the road would potentially result in erosion of their cultures by destroying their food sources.

An alternative to the Darién Gap highway would be a river ferry service between Turbo or Necoclí, Colombia, and one of several sites along Panama's Caribbean coast. Ferry services such as Crucero Express and Ferry Xpress served to bridge the gap for many years in the past; however, their services were eventually suspended due to being unprofitable. As of 2023, nothing has come of this idea.

In recent decades, several proposals to construct a combination of bridges and tunnels have been studied, as such a construction would enable uninterrupted transport through this region while effectively bypassing environmentally sensitive areas.

== History ==
=== Pre-Columbian history ===
There are a large number of sites in the Darién Gap with impressive platform mounds, plazas, paved roads, stone sculptures, and artifacts made from jade, gold, and ceramic materials.

The Guna people lived in what is now Northern Colombia and the Darién Province of Panama at the time of the Spanish conquest, and they subsequently began to move westward due to a conflict with the Spanish and other indigenous groups. Centuries before the conquest, the Gunas arrived in South America as part of a Chibchan migration that moved east from Central America. At the time of the Spanish invasion, they were living in the region of Uraba, near the borders of what are now Antioquia and Caldas. The Guna themselves attribute their several migrations to conflicts with other chiefdoms, and their migration to nearby islands in particular to escape malarial mosquito populations on the mainland.

=== European settlement ===
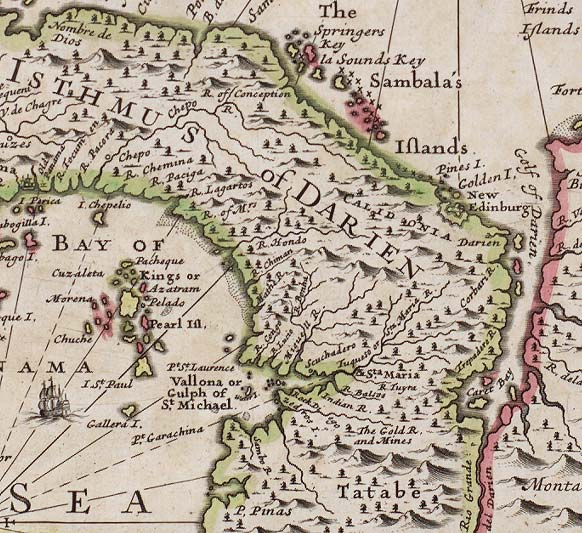
"A New Map of the Isthmus of Darién in America, The Bay of Panama, The Gulph of Vallona or St. Michael, with its Islands and Countries Adjacent". In A letter giving a description of the Isthmus of Darien, Edinburgh: 1699

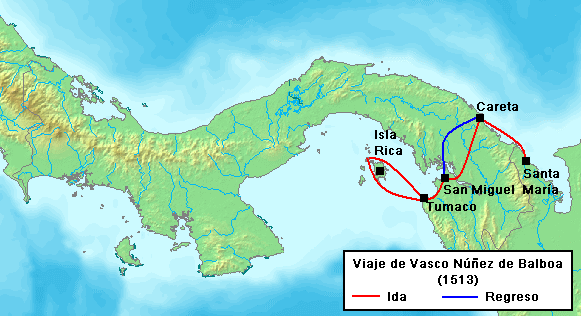
Vasco Núñez de Balboa's travel route to the South Sea, 1513

Vasco Núñez de Balboa and Alonso de Ojeda explored the coast of Colombia in 1500 and 1501. They spent the most time in the Gulf of Urabá, where they made contact with the Gunas. The regional border was initially established in 1508 following a royal decree that separated the colonial governorships of Castilla de Oro and Nueva Andalucía, picking the River Atrato as the boundary between the two governorships.

Balboa heard of the "South Sea" from locals while sailing along the Caribbean coast. On 25 September 1513, he reached the Pacific.

In 1519, the town of Panamá was founded near a small indigenous settlement on the Pacific coast. After the Spaniards entered what is now Peru, it developed into an important transshipment port as well as an administrative center.

In 1671, the Welsh pirate Henry Morgan crossed the Isthmus of Panama from the Caribbean side and destroyed the city; the town was subsequently relocated a few kilometers to the west on a small peninsula. The ruins of the old town, Panamá Viejo, are preserved and were declared a UNESCO World Heritage Site in 1997.

Silver and gold from the viceroyalty of Peru were transported across the isthmus by the Spanish Silver Train to Porto Bello, where Spanish treasure fleets shipped them to Seville and Cádiz from 1707. Lionel Wafer spent four years between 1680 and 1684 among the Gunas.

In 1698, the Kingdom of Scotland tried to establish a settlement in a project known as the Darién scheme, intending to tame, occupy, and administer the non-traversable land of the Darién Gap, and use it as a gateway to trade between the Atlantic and Pacific oceans, as was later achieved successfully by the Panama Railroad and then the Panama Canal. The first expedition of five ships (Saint Andrew, Caledonia, Unicorn, Dolphin, and Endeavour) set sail from Leith on 14 July 1698, with around 1,200 people on board. Their orders were "to proceed to the Bay of Darién, and make the Isle called the Golden Island ... some few leagues to the leeward of the mouth of the great River of Darién ... and there make a settlement on the mainland". After calling at Madeira and the West Indies, the fleet made landfall off the coast of Darién on 2 November. The settlers christened their new home "New Caledonia".

The aim was for the colony to have an overland route that connected the Pacific and Atlantic oceans. Since its inception, it has been said that the undertaking was beset by poor planning and provisioning, divided leadership, a poor choice of trade goods, devastating epidemics of disease, reported attempts by the East India Company to frustrate it, and a failure to anticipate the Spanish Empire's military response. It was finally abandoned in March 1700 after a siege and harbor blockade by Spanish forces.

As the Company of Scotland was backed by approximately 20% of all the money circulating in Scotland, its failure left the Scottish Lowlands in substantial financial ruin; in fact, English financial incentives are thought to have been a factor in persuading those in power to support the 1707 union with England. According to this argument, the Scottish establishment of landed aristocracy and mercantile elites, almost bankrupted by the Darién fiasco, considered that their best chance of being part of a major power would be to share the benefits of England's international trade and the growth of the English overseas possessions, so its future would have to lie in unity with England.

== Panamanian independence ==
Most of Panama was part of Colombia until it declared its independence in 1903, with encouragement and support from the United States. The geography of Darién, through which no troops could pass, made its Departamento of Panamá harder to defend and control.

The current border is regulated by the Victoria-Vélez Treaty, signed in Bogotá on 20 August 1924 by the Foreign Minister of Panama, Nicolás Victoria, and Foreign Minister of Colombia, Jorge Vélez. This treaty is officially registered in the Register No. 814 of the Treaty League of Nations, on 17 August 1925; said border was based on the same Colombian law of 9 June 1855.

=== Natural resources ===
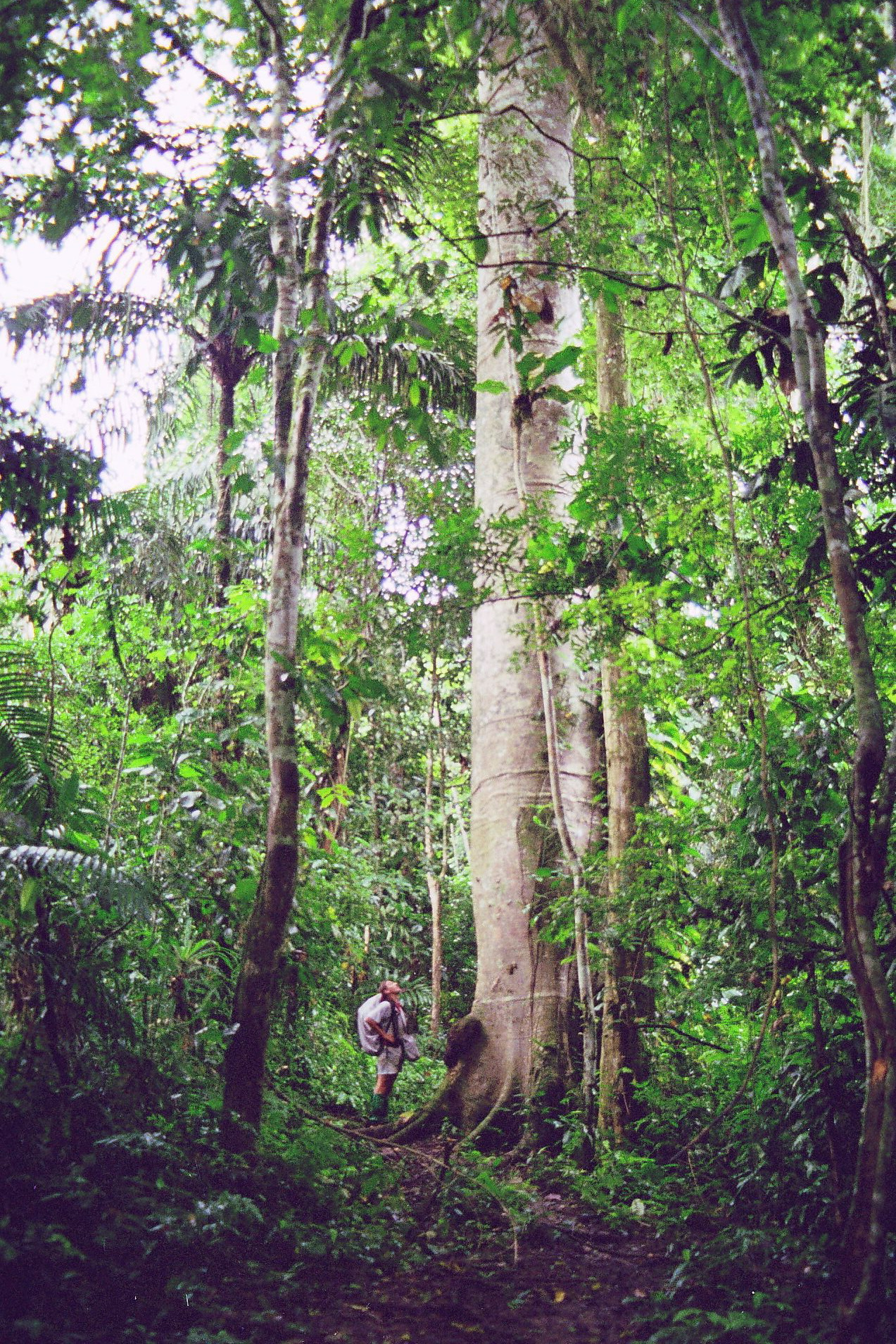
A ceiba tree in the Darién Gap

Two major national parks exist in the Darién Gap: Darién National Park in Panama and Los Katíos National Park in Colombia. The Darién Gap forests had extensive Cedrela and mahogany cover until many of these trees were removed by loggers.

Darién National Park in Panama, the largest national park in Central America, covers approximately 5,790 km^{2} (2,240 sq mi) of land and was established in 1980. The property includes a stretch of the Pacific Coast and almost the entire border region with neighbouring Colombia.

=== Copa Airlines Flight 201 ===
On 6 June 1992, Copa Airlines Flight 201, a Boeing 737 jet airplane on a flight between Panama City and Cali, Colombia, crashed in the Darién Gap, killing all 47 people on board.

== Adventure travelers ==
To travel between the continents through the Darién Gap has long been a challenge.

The Gap can be transited by off-road vehicles attempting intercontinental journeys. The first post-colonial expedition to the Darién was the Marsh Darién Expedition in 1924–25, supported by several major sponsors, including the Smithsonian Institution, the American Museum of Natural History, and the government of Panama.

An attempted vehicular crossing of the Gap was made by three Brazilians –Leonidas Borges de Oliveira, Francisco Lopez da Cruz, and Mário Fava– who were trying to bring attention to the Pan-American highway following an International Conference in Chile, in 1923. They left Rio de Janeiro in 1928 and arrived in the United States in 1938. They were forced to disassemble the automobiles and take them by boat around the gap.

A crossing was completed by the Land Rover La Cucaracha Cariñosa (The Affectionate Cockroach) and a Jeep of the Trans-Darién Expedition of 1959–60. They left Chepo, Panama, on 2 February 1960 and reached Quibdó, Colombia, on 17 June 1960, averaging 201 m (220 yd) per hour over 136 days.

In December 1960, on a motorcycle trip from Alaska to Argentina, adventurer Danny Liska attempted to transit the Darién Gap from Panama to Colombia. In Panama City, Liska decided to fly his motorcycle ahead to Medellin, and proceed across the Gap by boat and on foot. He was later forced to abandon his motorcycle when he was not able to clear it at a customs office in Punta Arenas, and was once again afoot.

In 1961, a team of three 1961 Chevrolet Corvairs and several support vehicles departed from Panama. After 109 days, they reached the Colombian Border with two Corvairs, the third having been abandoned in the jungle.

In 1972, a team of explorers from the British Army spent 96 days crossing the Gap in a pair of Range Rover Classic SUVs. The crossing was part of a much larger Pan-American adventure, The British Trans-Americas Expedition. Explorer and British Army Colonel John Blashford-Snell was the expedition's leader, while the vehicles were overseen and driven by Army Officer Gavin Thompson, along with eight Royal Engineers. As the journey became exceedingly difficult due to the terrain, the two SUVs were joined by a third vehicle—a Land Rover Series II—to help blaze the trail ahead. The seven-month 27,494 km (17,084 mi) long journey began in Alaska and successfully finished in Tierra del Fuego, Argentina. It was the first north-to-south crossing of the Americas on land vehicles in a single trip via the Gap.

The first fully overland wheeled crossing of the Gap was that of British cyclist Ian Hibell, who rode from Cape Horn to Alaska between 1971 and 1973 (others used boats for some sections). Hibell took the "direct" overland south-to-north route, including an overland crossing of the Atrato Swamp in Colombia.

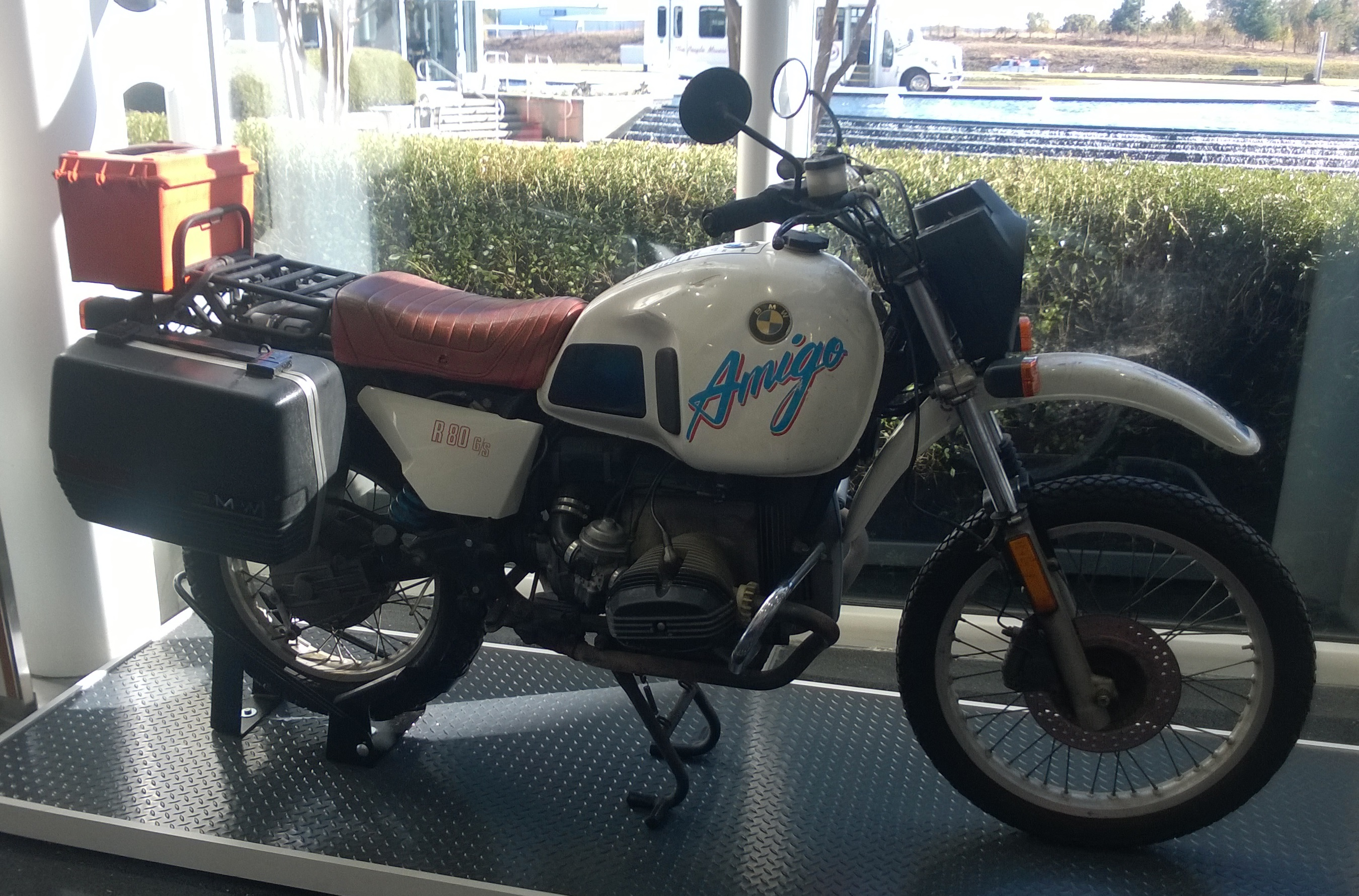
Ed Culberson's "Amigo" (a BMW R80G/S motorcycle) was the first motor vehicle to fully navigate the Pan-American Highway by land.

Ed Culberson was the first one to follow the entire Pan-American highway proposed route, including the Darién Gap, on a motorcycle, a BMW R80G/S.

From 1994 to 1997, the Gap was briefly joined by a ferry service provided by Crucero Express.

A number of notable crossings have been made on foot. Sebastian Snow crossed the Gap with Wade Davis in 1975 as part of his unbroken walk from Tierra del Fuego to Costa Rica. The trip is documented in his 1976 book The Rucksack Man and in Wade Davis's 1996 book One River. In 1981, George Meegan crossed the gap on a similar journey. He, too, started in Tierra del Fuego and eventually ended in Alaska. His 1988 biography, The Longest Walk, describes the trip and includes a 25-page chapter on his foray through the Gap.

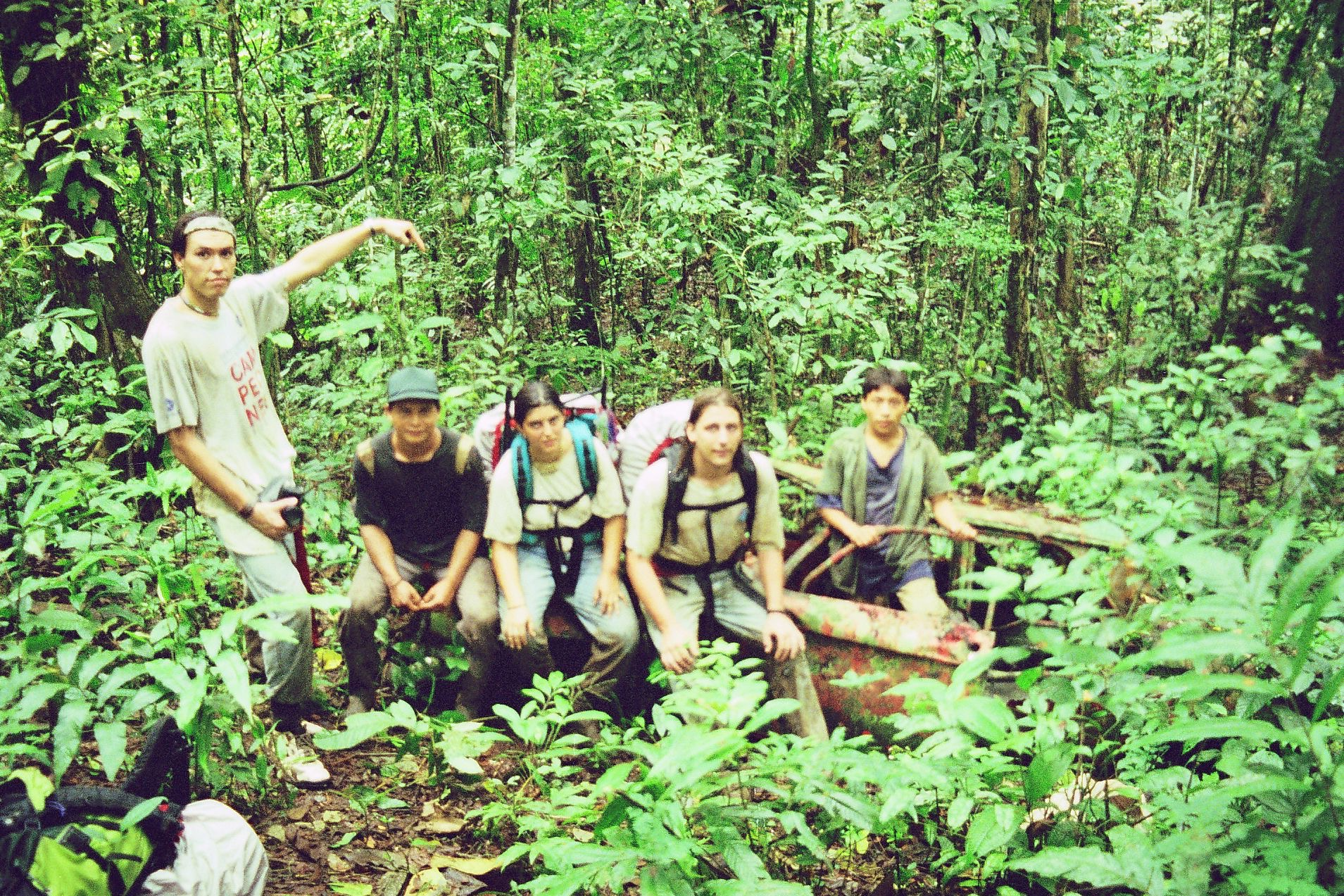
The first Mexican by-foot crossers take a rest by the "Lost Corvair", abandoned in 1961 by a caravan from Chicago.

In 1979, evangelist Arthur Blessitt traversed the gap while carrying a 3.7-meter (12 ft) wooden cross, a trek confirmed by Guinness World Records as part of "the longest round-the-world pilgrimage" for Christ.

In July 1961, three college students, Carl Adler, James Wirth, and Joseph Bellina, crossed from the Bay of San Miguel to Puerto Obaldia on the Gulf of Parita (near Colombia) and ultimately to Mulatupu in the San Blas Islands. The trip across the Darién was by banana boat, piragua, and foot via the Tuira river (La Palma and El Real de Santa Maria), Río Chucunaque (Yaviza), Río Tuquesa (Chaua's (General Choco Chief) Trading Post—Choco Indian village), and Serranía del Darién.

In 1985, Project Raleigh, which evolved from Project Drake in 1984 and in 1989 became Raleigh International, sponsored an expedition that also crossed the Darién coast to coast.

Between the early 1980s and mid-1990s, Encounter Overland, a British adventure travel company, organized two- to three-week trekking trips through the Darién Gap from Panama to Colombia or vice versa. These trips used a combination of whatever transport was available: jeeps, buses, boats, and walking, with travelers carrying their own supplies.

Complete overland crossings of the Darién rainforest on foot and riverboat (i.e., from the last road in Panama to the first road in Colombia) became more dangerous in the 1990s because of the Colombian conflict. The Colombian portion of the Darién rainforest in the Katios Park region eventually fell under the control of armed groups. Furthermore, combatants from Colombia even entered Panama, occupied some Panamanian jungle villages, and kidnapped or killed inhabitants and travelers.

Karl Bushby, a 56 year old British ex-paratrooper, spent two months crossing the Darién Gap from Colombia to Panama in 2001.

== Migrants traveling northward ==
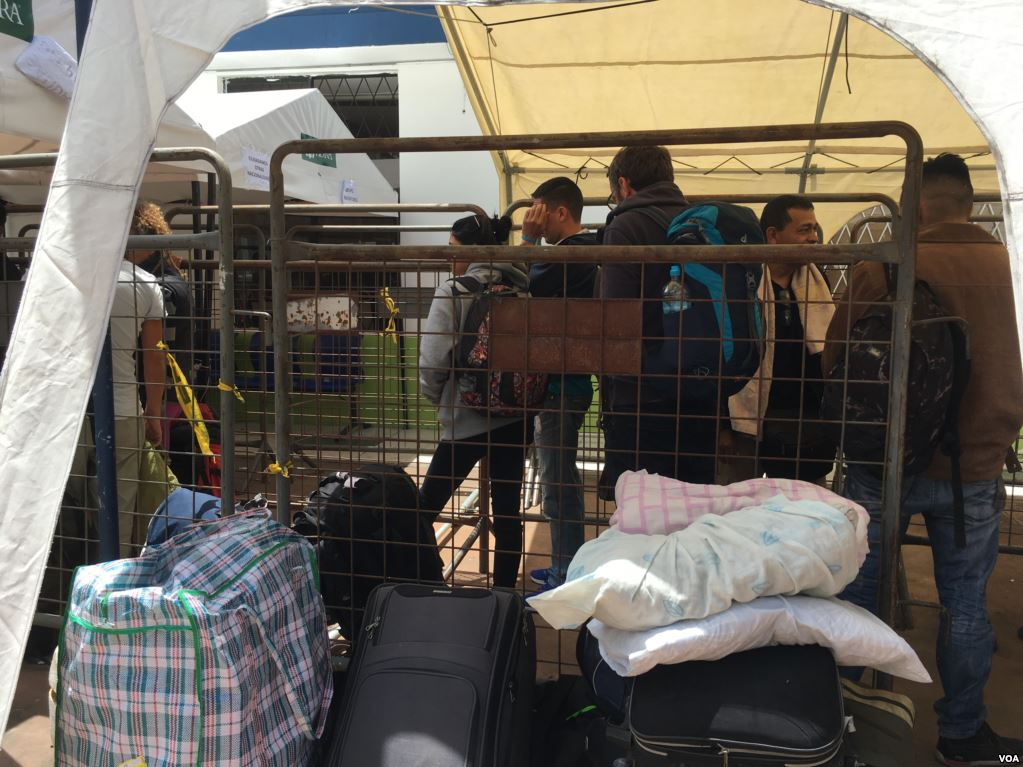
Venezuelan migrants being processed in Ecuador in preparation to make the long journey north to New York City, including crossing the Darién Gap

While the Darién Gap has been considered to be essentially impassable, in the 21st century, thousands of migrants, primarily Haitians during the 2010s and Venezuelans during the 2020s, crossed the Darién Gap to reach the United States. By 2021, the number was more than 130,000, increasing to 520,000 in 2023, but dropping to 300,000 in 2024, for the more organized 2½ day trek, which used to take a week. Of the 334,000 migrants who crossed over the first eight months of 2023, 60% were Venezuelan, motivating the Biden administration to provide foreign assistance to help Panama deport migrants.

The hike, which involves crossing rivers which flood frequently, is unpleasant, demanding, and dangerous, with rape and robbery common, and there are numerous fatalities. In 2024 there were 55 known deaths, probably more, and 180 unaccompanied minors were abandoned and looked after by child care institutions, some because their relatives died or got lost, others travelling unaccompanied.

By 2013, the coastal route on the east side of the Darién Isthmus became relatively safe, by taking a motorboat across the Gulf of Uraba from Turbo to Capurganá and then hopping the coast to Sapzurro and hiking from there to La Miel, Panama. All inland routes through the Darién remain highly dangerous. In June 2017, CBS journalist Adam Yamaguchi filmed smugglers leading refugees on a nine-day journey from Colombia to Panama through the Darién.

People from Africa, South Asia, the Middle East, the Caribbean, and China have been known to cross the Darién Gap as a method of migrating to the United States. This route may entail flying to Ecuador to take advantage of its liberal visa policy, and attempting to cross the gap on foot. Journalist Jason Motlagh was interviewed by Sacha Pfeiffer on NPR's nationally syndicated radio show On Point in 2016 concerning his work following migrants through the Darién Gap. Journalists Nadja Drost and Bruno Federico were interviewed by Nick Schifrin about their work following migrants through the Darién Gap in mid-2019, and the effects of the COVID-19 pandemic a year later, as part of a series on migration to the United States for PBS NewsHour.

In 2023, people fleeing China travelled to Ecuador, then to Necoclí in Colombia, with the intention of crossing the Darién Gap on foot. The number of Chinese people crossing the Darién Gap increased each month in 2023.

In March 2024, Catholic bishops from bordering dioceses gathered to discuss the migration crisis. Speaking to the pontifical charity Aid to the Church in Need, Panamanian Archbishop José Domingo Ulloa said of the situation: "We feel we must raise our voice at the growing humanitarian crisis in the jungle region of the Darién Gap and the terrible conditions of death and vulnerability these migrants face. An incalculable number of people lose their lives and many of the bodies of the fallen are never retrieved.” The bishops criticised traffickers who "make a living off the desperation of our brothers" and received a message from Pope Francis, describing the route as "a way of the Cross".

In September 2024, journalist Caitlin Dickerson reported on immigration through the Darién Gap for The Atlantic.

== The route in the 21st century ==
Records are not kept, but it is known that many migrants die on this trip.

The hiking trail ascends abruptly over a mountain; the four-day hike is a challenge even for a person in good physical shape. Nonetheless, women who are carrying babies or pregnant still make the attempt.

Rainfall in the Darién Gap produces flash floods that can carry sleepers to their deaths. Several rivers without bridges or boats must be crossed. No services of any kind are available; food, a tent and water purification materials sufficient for a hike of several days must be carried. Bodies of migrants are often found, but the number found is said to be grossly under-reported by authorities in Panama. There is no medical help and no way to evacuate someone ill, injured, or exhausted. A broken leg is usually fatal. There are many insects, snakes, and carnivorous animals. Many migrants are robbed or raped. There is no police presence and no cellphone service.

== Armed conflict ==
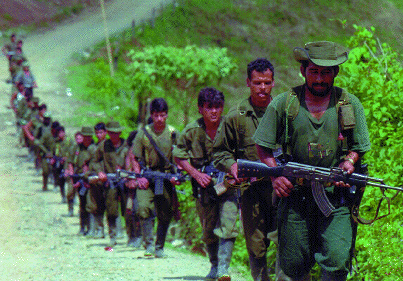
FARC insurgents in 1998

The Darién Gap was subject to the Marxist Revolutionary Armed Forces of Colombia (FARC), which led an insurgency against the Colombian government. FARC rebels were present on both the Colombian and Panamanian sides of the border.

Other non-political victims include three New Tribes missionaries, who died after disappearing from the Panamanian side in 1993.

In 2003, Robert Young Pelton, on assignment for National Geographic Adventure magazine, and two traveling companions, Mark Wedeven and Megan Smaker, were detained for a week by the United Self-Defense Forces of Colombia, a far-right paramilitary organization, in a highly publicized incident.

In May 2013, Swedish backpacker Jan Philip Braunisch disappeared in the area after leaving the Colombian town of Riosucio to attempt crossing on foot to Panama via the Cuenca Cacarica. The FARC admitted to killing him, having mistaken him for a foreign spy.

== In fiction ==
The seventh episode of Pluribus sees Manousos Oviedo (Carlos Manuel Vesga) attempt a crossing of the Darién Gap on foot, along his journey from Paraguay to the United States.

== See also ==
- Darién scheme
- Derienni
- Gulf of Darién
- Lionel Wafer
- Zouxian
