= Jason Motlagh =

Iranian-American journalist, writer, photographer

- Born: Jason Motlagh
- Occupations: journalist, photographer, filmmaker
- Website: jasonmotlagh.com

Jason Motlagh is an Iranian-American journalist, photographer, and filmmaker.

He has reported for media organisations including The Economist, The Washington Post, The New Republic, The Atlantic, The Christian Science Monitor, and U.S. News & World Report. Motagh is a Pulitzer Center International Reporting Fellow and former Kabul, Afghanistan, correspondent for Time. He was interviewed by Sacha Pfeiffer on NPR's nationally syndicated radio show On Point in 2016 concerning his work following migrants through the Darién Gap.

== Awards ==
Motlagh won the National Magazine Award in 2010 for News Reporting for a four-part series on the 2008 Mumbai attacks, titled Sixty Hours of Terror, published in the Virginia Quarterly Review. Motlagh also received a Madeline Dane Ross Award from The Overseas Press Club for "best international reporting in the print medium or online showing a concern for the human condition" for his essay The Ghosts of Rana Plaza, a report on the Rana Plaza factory collapse in Bangladesh. The essay also won the Daniel Pearl Award for best reporting on South Asia and was a finalist for the 2015 National Magazine Award in reporting.

== See also ==
- Pulitzer Center on Crisis Reporting
- Photojournalism
