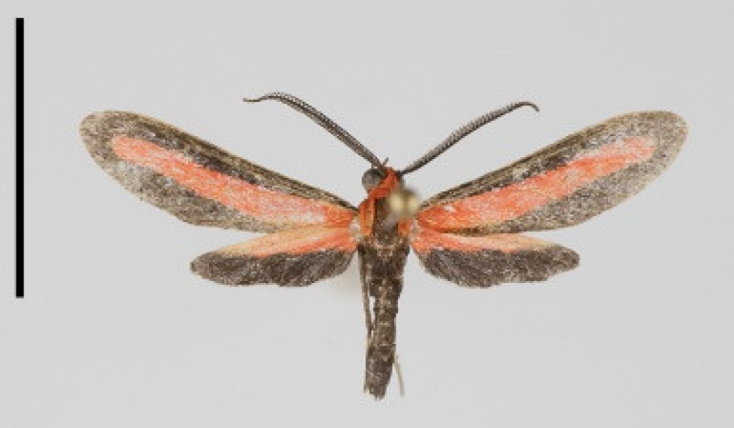

Scientific classification
- Kingdom: Animalia
- Phylum: Arthropoda
- Clade: Pancrustacea
- Class: Insecta
- Order: Lepidoptera
- Superfamily: Noctuoidea
- Family: Erebidae
- Subfamily: Arctiinae
- Genus: Tipulodes
- Species: T. rubriceps

Binomial name
- Tipulodes rubriceps Dognin, 1912

= Tipulodes rubriceps =

Species of moth

Tipulodes rubriceps is a moth in the subfamily Arctiinae. It was described by Paul Dognin in 1912. It is found in Colombia, Brazil, Ecuador, and Peru.
