= Amos Corwine =

American journalist and diplomat (1815–1880)

U.S. Consul at Panama

Personal details
- Born: Amos Breckinridge Corwine; 1815 Maysville, Kentucky, U.S.
- Died: 22 June 1880 (aged 64–65) New Rochelle, New York, U.S.

Military service
- Allegiance: United States
- Branch/service: United States Army; United States Volunteers
- Years of service: 1846–1847
- Rank: Second lieutenant
- Commands: 1st Mississippi Rifles

Amos Breckinridge Corwine (1815 – 22 June, 1880) was an American soldier, journalist and diplomat.

Born in Maysville, Kentucky, his early years were spent on his father's plantation in Mississippi. He published the Yazoo Banner from 1840 to 1844. He served during the Mexican–American War as a lieutenant in the 1st Mississippi Rifles commanded by Jefferson Davis, and was severely wounded at the Battle of Buena Vista. After that war, in partnership with his brother Samuel, he edited the Cincinnati Chronicle.

During the administrations of Presidents John Tyler and Millard Fillmore he was the U.S. Consul at Panama. In 1856, he was sent by President Franklin Pierce to investigate the Watermelon Riot, and his report was the basis for the treaty and adjustment of damages between the United States and New Granada. He was reappointed consul, and remained in Panama until 1861.

He died in New Rochelle, New York, on 22 June, 1880.
