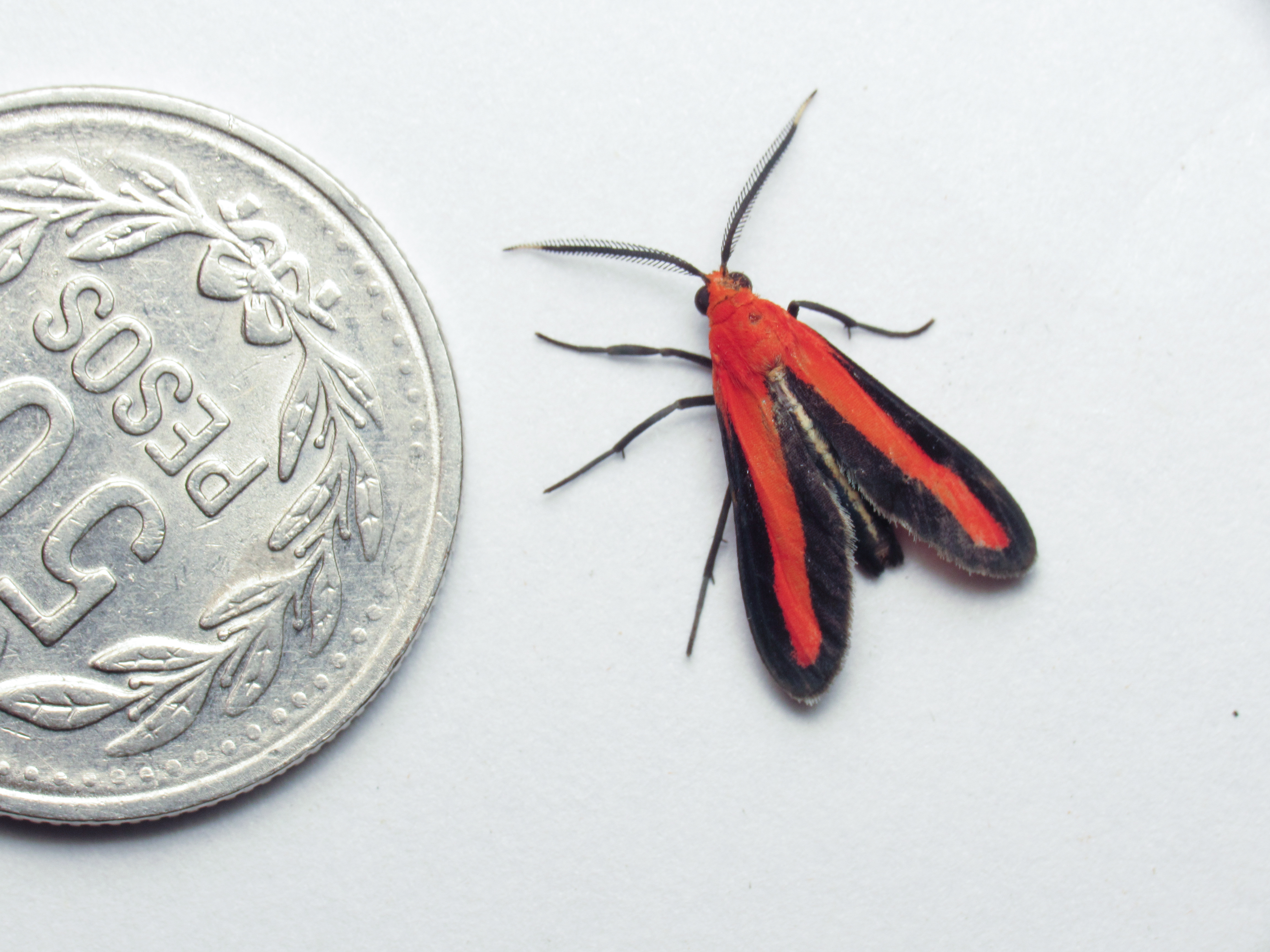
- Tipulodes annae

Scientific classification
- Kingdom: Animalia
- Phylum: Arthropoda
- Class: Insecta
- Order: Lepidoptera
- Superfamily: Noctuoidea
- Family: Erebidae
- Subfamily: Arctiinae
- Genus: Tipulodes; Boisduval, 1832

= Tipulodes =

Genus of moths

Tipulodes is a genus of moths in the subfamily Arctiinae, which currently contains 3 species. The genus was described by Boisduval in 1832. The genus is described as "Small Arctiids with relatively narrow wings. Ground colour brownish black with characteristic wings patterns. Forewing with elongate rusty-red blotch from the base almost to the apex, hindwing with rusty-red stripe along the costal edge; underside of wings similarly coloured. Males with coremata forming membranous tubes, much longer than abdomen when everted, covered with hairs along the whole length"

== Species ==
- Tipulodes ima Boisduval, 1832
- Tipulodes rubriceps Dognin, 1912
- Tipulodes annae Przybyłowicz, 2003
