= Tipulodes ima =

Scientific classification
- Kingdom: Animalia
- Phylum: Arthropoda
- Class: Insecta
- Order: Lepidoptera
- Superfamily: Noctuoidea
- Family: Erebidae
- Subfamily: Arctiinae
- Genus: Tipulodes
- Species: T. ima

Binomial name
- Tipulodes ima Boisduval, 1832

Species of moth

Tipulodes ima is a moth in the subfamily Arctiinae. It was described by Jean Baptiste Boisduval in 1832. It is found in the Brazilian states of Espírito Santo, Rio Grande do Sul and Rio de Janeiro, and in Paraguay and Argentina.
