= Derienni =

1850s band of Panamanian outlaws

Derienni was the group of the native bandits in the Grenadine Department of Panama in the early 1850s, during the California Gold Rush. They would rob the pack trains crossing the Isthmus of Panama with sacks of California gold and run off with it into the hills. These highwaymen harassed the gold trains to the point that several of the large shippers were considering transferring their business to the Transit Route of Commodore Vanderbilt across the Isthmus of Nicaragua who promised to hire units of the Nicaraguan army as guards.

The Panama Railroad Company sought help from Wells, Fargo & Company and a private police force, the Isthmian Guard, was organized and led by Randolph Runnels, an ex-Texas Ranger. He identified the ringleaders and one night in early 1852 he had 37 of them hanged in a public square and the trouble ceased for a time. After half a year, robberies began again Runnels and his men investigated again and after another night in late 1852, he rounded up the remaining offenders; 41 more were hanged ending the reign of the Derienni.

== See also ==
- Darién

== Sources ==
- Joseph L. Schott, Rails Across Panama - The Story of the Building of the Panama Railroad 1849-1855, The Bob Merrill Company Inc., New York: N.Y., 1967.
- Michael L. Conniff, Panama and the United States: the forced alliance, University of Georgia Press, Athens, Georgia, 2001.
