= Zouxian (phenomenon) =

Chinese immigration to the United States via Mexico

- Simplified Chinese: 走线
- Traditional Chinese: 走線
Transcriptions
Standard Mandarin
- Hanyu Pinyin: zǒuxiàn

Zouxian (Chinese: 走线; pinyin: zǒuxiàn; lit. 'walk the route') is the phenomenon of Chinese migrants entering the United States through its southwestern border with Mexico. The phenomenon became more prominent in the early 2020s. In 2021, at the Darién gap, the Panamanian police counted 200 Chinese migrants; in contrast, in the first half of 2022, close to 9,000 Chinese migrants made the crossing. The number of such immigrants declined significantly in 2025 during the second presidency of Donald Trump, with only 80 Chinese nationals crossing the border in July 2025.

== Historical context ==
Chinese immigration to the United States first emerged in the mid-19th century, largely in the Western United States, brought on by domestic political and economic instability. As of 2004, over four million ethnic Chinese citizens were living in Canada and the United States, comprising the largest and third largest minority groups, respectively. This early wave of immigration contributed significantly to the growth of Chinese ethnic enclaves and the establishment of 'Chinatown' communities within Los Angeles and New York, which has led to the United States emerging as the preferred destination for Chinese immigrants.

Relations between the United States and the People's Republic of China were normalised in 1979. While this subsequently granted a legal entry point for those emigrating from the mainland of China, the number of immigrants allowed to enter the U.S. is subject to immigration quotas. These quotas prioritize Mainland Chinese citizens with financial and familial ties to the United States and are still restrictive, leaving many with no legal opportunity to enter the country. This first became an issue in the 1980s, with political and economic liberalisation in the mainland of China leading to a sharp increase in chain migration as Mainland Chinese families sought to reunite.

=== People smuggling in Latin America ===
The Chinese diaspora in Latin and South America, as in North America, has existed since the 19th century owing to labor shortages in the Americas. Mexico, in particular, encouraged Chinese immigration, signing a commercial treaty in 1899 that allowed Chinese citizens to run enterprises in Mexico, some of which would become involved in people smuggling. Chinese shell companies in Mexico can issue fake work visas for immigrants to allow access to the United States border.

Mainland Chinese people smuggling developed mainly from a decentralized platform utilizing intermediaries and independent businesses to engage in their operations. Mexican people smugglers and human traffickers are the subcontractors used to guide Mainland Chinese immigrants through the United States border. Where payment through coyotes has often manifested in indentured servitude, Mainland Chinese people smuggling has historically adopted a system utilizing family located in the United States to ensure full payment.

== Development ==
Since the COVID-19 outbreak, Mainland Chinese citizens have more frequently discussed leaving the mainland of China on social media.

Even after Beijing lifted its COVID restrictions, the inclination towards zouxian has persisted. According to the United States Border Patrol, between January and September 2023, there were 21,870 Mainland Chinese illegal immigration reports, which was 13% higher than in 2022. During his 2024 presidential campaign, Donald Trump promised to stop Chinese crossings from the southern border, claiming that they were "building an army". During the second presidency of Donald Trump, such immigration declined dramatically, with border crossings by Chinese immigrants dropping from 6,000 in December 2023 to 80 in July 2025.

== Route ==
The difficulty in reaching the United States legally by obtaining a visa has meant that some mainland Chinese migrants have attempted to get there through other means. For most, flying to Ecuador, where mainland Chinese citizens were not required to acquire a tourist visa, was the only option. The inflated costs from Ecuador to the United States indicate that whilst some migrants come from working-class backgrounds, many have been middle-class migrants hoping to leave the mainland of China. In July 2024, Ecuador canceled its visa-free agreement with China, which contributed to the decline of migrants.

Upon reaching Ecuador, migrants usually crossed eight countries in Latin and Central America. The past decade has witnessed an increase in mainland Chinese criminal groups operating in Latin America, specializing in four activities: trafficking fentanyl, laundering money, illegal wildlife trade, and migrant smuggling. For most Mainland Chinese migrants, contacting a snakehead (people smuggler) within these criminal organizations became a part of attempting the journey. Snakeheads employ local guides to assist migrants where hazards are present. There has been a risk of the snakehead abandoning them or demanding more money midway through the journey. Migrants use social media platforms such as Telegram to share information with each other. Some do not survive the journey as they face hunger, robbery, or kidnapping by local gangs.

=== Entering the United States ===
Once reaching the border, the immigrants previously faced little opposition to seeking asylum, with the grant rate of asylum seekers from the mainland of China into the United States being 55% in 2023. However, by May 2025, asylum acceptance rates declined to just 20%. This is contrasted by the level of visa application refusals being approximately 30%, contributing to the statistic that United States visa refusals are 90% below pre-pandemic levels. When in the United States, many move to Mainland Chinese districts in large cities such as San Francisco and New York. Through the use of social media, friends, and family connections, many are able to find jobs that are cash-in-hand, forgoing the need for a green card or an employment authorization document.

== Causes ==
The increasing asylum-seeking through zouxian is linked closely with the repercussions of the COVID-19 pandemic. Economic frustrations over Beijing's political reform have eroded the social confidence of some Mainland Chinese people, particularly in the lower-class hierarchy.

=== Political factors ===
A key driver of zouxian resulted from people's dissatisfaction with CCP general secretary Xi Jinping's authoritarian governance. Due to the implementation of the "Zero-COVID" policy, Mainland Chinese households experienced widespread lockdowns, compulsory mass testing, and concentrated treatment of patients, which resulted in social problems like food shortages, family separations, and unequal healthcare access. Ultimately, following the catastrophic fire in Urumqi, accumulated public resentment outburst on October 25, 2022, in the form of street protests, calling for an end to COVID restrictions, free elections and the resignation of Xi Jinping. A common expression among the runners was their discontent toward the absence of free speech and religion, which intensified due to the COVID-19 pandemic's constraints. Some runners claimed to face different degrees of governmental oppression for their speeches during COVID regulation, including university expulsion, police interrogation and imprisonment. Many runners attributed their determination to zouxian based on their COVID-19 political witness and experiences.

=== Economic factors ===
Data from June 2023 suggest that real income growth remained below the inflation rate, with the youth unemployment rate reaching a new high of 20.4%. Subdued private investment continued in 2022, and the property market overall has depressed. The runners expressed their despair of an economic recovery. Young runners complained about the asymmetrically heavy workload versus poor salary. Another recurring demographic is small business owners, who incurred a high revenue deduction from COVID restrictions and thus became pessimistic about future business opportunities in the mainland of China. Most of the runners are aware that they are unlikely to obtain well-paying positions in the short run as asylum seekers. However, they believe the current toil will be worth paying if the next generation can grow with greater prosperity.

=== Social media ===
In recent years, social media has played a pivotal role in various movements in the mainland of China. Mainland Chinese undocumented immigration through the Southwestern United States border is not a COVID-exclusive phenomenon. Traversing the Darién Gap to reach Panama has been a COVID-inspired expedient. The China-Ecuador visa-free agreement gave rise to the rationale of making Ecuador the landing area for the runners while it lasted. Sharing and instruction transmission on media platforms, namely Telegram, TikTok, Twitter and YouTube, played a crucial role in alleviating the public's anxiety.
