= Bowman H. McCalla =

United States Navy admiral (1844–1910)

Bowman Hendry McCalla
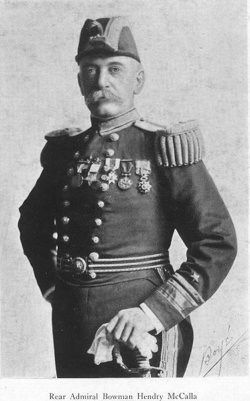
- Born: June 19, 1844; Camden, New Jersey
- Died: May 6, 1910 (aged 65); Santa Barbara, California
- Burial place: Arlington National Cemetery
- Military career
- Allegiance: United States
- Branch: United States Navy
- Service years: 1861–1906
- Rank: Admiral
- Conflicts: American Civil War; Panama crisis of 1885; Spanish–American War; Battle of Cienfuegos; Battle of Guantanamo Bay; Battle of Fort Cayo del Tore; Boxer Rebellion; China Relief Expedition; Battle of Hsiku Arsenal

Rear Admiral Bowman Hendry McCalla (June 19, 1844 – May 6, 1910) was an officer in the United States Navy, who was noted for his roles in the Spanish–American War and putting down the Boxer Rebellion.

== Biography ==
Bowman H. McCalla was born in Camden, New Jersey on June 19, 1844. He was appointed midshipman on November 30, 1861. McCalla's courage and leadership during his career often earned him great, and due, respect among his fellow officers.

In the spring of 1885, during the Panama crisis of 1885, McCalla led an expeditionary force of 750 seamen and marines which landed at Panama to protect American treaty rights when the revolution there threatened to block transit across the isthmus.

As commanding officer of USS Marblehead, from September 11, 1897 to September 16, 1898, he took part in the blockade of Cuba and was responsible for the cutting of submarine cables linking Cienfuegos with the outside world, thus isolating the Spanish garrison there, in May 1898. In June 1898, he led the invasion of Guantánamo Bay.

While in command of Newark during the Boxer Rebellion two years later, he was cited for conspicuous gallantry in battle as he led a force of sailors from Tianjin to Beijing. McCalla's force of 112 men spearheaded an international column, under British Admiral Sir Edward Seymour, which was attempting to fight its way to the aid of foreign legations under siege at Tianjin. In the course of the battle at Hsiku Arsenal, McCalla, along with 25 of his force, was wounded; five were killed. See Seymour Expedition, China 1900.

Commissioned rear admiral October 11, 1903, and entered on the retired list June 19, 1906, McCalla died on May 6, 1910, at Santa Barbara, California, and was buried in Arlington National Cemetery.

== Awards ==
- Sampson Medal
- Civil War Campaign Medal
- Spanish Campaign Medal
- Philippine Campaign Medal
- China Relief Expedition Medal

== Memberships ==
In 1898 he was elected as a veteran companion of the New York Commandery of the Military Order of Foreign Wars. He was also a veteran companion of the Illinois Commandery of the Military Order of the Loyal Legion of the United States, vice president of the Military Order of the Dragon and a member of the Grand Army of the Republic.

== Namesakes ==
Two US Navy ships were named USS McCalla in his honor. McCalla Field and McCalla Hill at Naval Station Guantanamo Bay are named after him as well.
