= Sapzurro =

- Populated center
- Location of the municipality and town of Acandí in the Chocó Department of Colombia

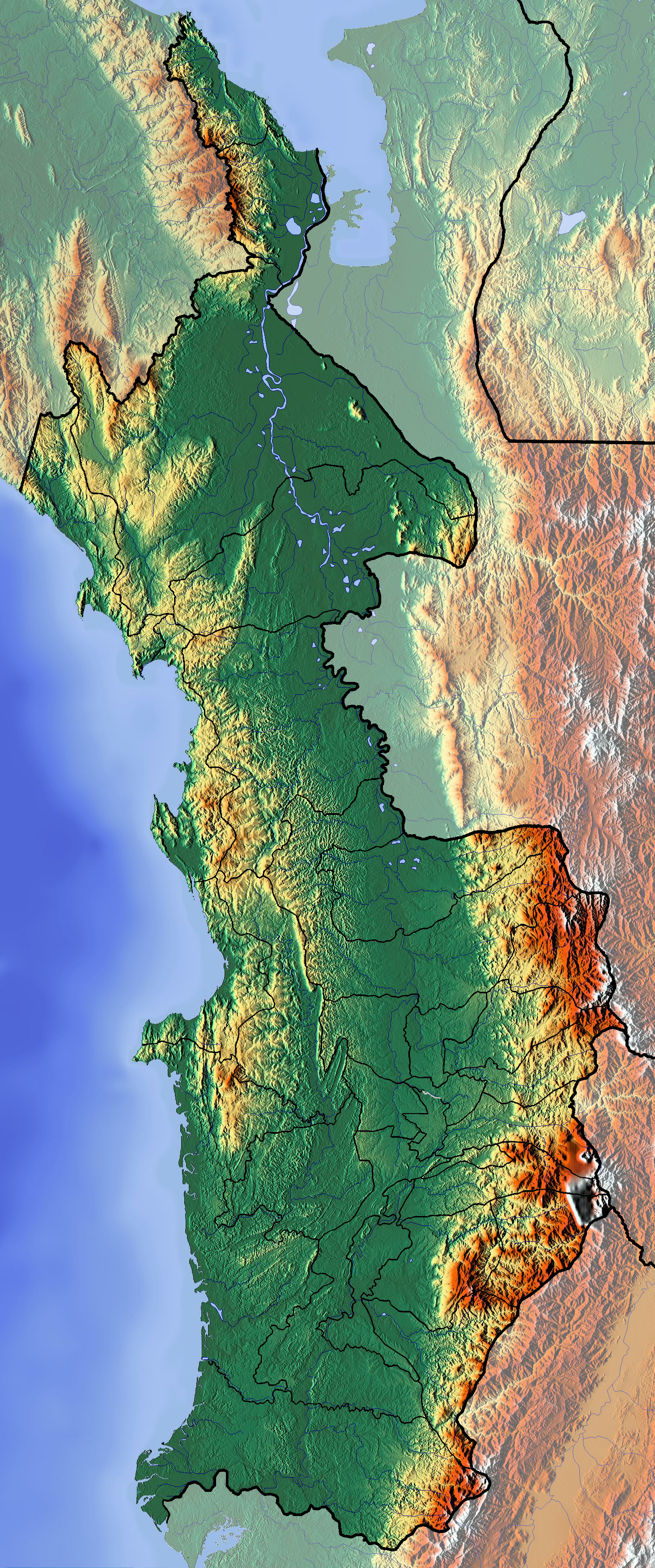
- Location in Colombia Sapzurro (Colombia) Sapzurro (the Caribbean)
- Coordinates: 8°39′30″N 77°21′59″W
- Country: Colombia
- Department: Chocó Department

Population
  - Total: 270
- Time zone: UTC-5 (Colombia Standard Time)

Sapzurro is a populated center of Colombia on the Caribbean Sea located in the northwest corner of the Republic of Colombia. It is part of the Municipality of Acandí, in the Chocó Department of the Darién region. The closest city is Capurganá, a semi-popular port town, and it is across the international boundary from the Panamanian town of La Miel.

== History ==
Sapzurro was founded in 1889 by Afro-Colombian settlers Gumercindo Medrano and Juana Caraballo, who arrived from the Barú Peninsula (Bolívar Department of Colombia). Later the settlers Feliciano Berrío arrived with Caridad Casiano, Juan de Dios Meza with Bonifacia Bravo, and some time later, Eliseo Zúñiga (Cuna), Mariano Pereira and Asención Pertúz, mostly from Bocachica and who are the main family members of this family community.

== Accessibility ==
There is ferry service between the Antonio Roldán Betancourt Airport (Apartadó Town) and Capurganá. The Turbo-Capurganá route has become popular for people crossing between Colombia and Panama. Daily boats transport passengers from Turbo to Capurganá then they have the option to walk or take a smaller panga to the small port of Sapzurro.

=== Traveling out ===
The first city in Panama is Puerto Obaldia, accessible by boat from Capurganá or Sapzurro in about 45 minutes. From inside the country there are flight connections from Medellín in the Enrique Olaya Herrera Airport with the aviation companies ADA and Searca.

== Geography ==
=== Climate ===
Tropical savanna climates have monthly mean temperatures above 18 °C (64 °F) in every month of the year and typically a pronounced dry season, with the driest month having precipitation less than 60mm (2.36 in) of precipitation. Köppen Climate Classification subtype for this climate is "Aw". (Tropical Savanna Climate). The average temperature for the year in Sapzurro is 81.0 °F (27.2 °C). The warmest month, on average, is May with an average temperature of 82.0 °F (27.8 °C). The coolest month on average is January, with an average temperature of 80.0 °F (26.7 °C).

Climate data for Sapzurro (Colombia)
Month	Jan	Feb	Mar	Apr	May	Jun	Jul	Aug	Sep	Oct	Nov	Dec	Year
Mean daily maximum °C (°F)	29 (84)	29 (84)	29 (84)	29 (85)	29 (85)	29 (85)	29 (85)	29 (84)	29 (84)	29 (84)	29 (85)	29 (84)	29 (84)
Mean daily minimum °C (°F)	24 (76)	24 (76)	25 (77)	25 (77)	25 (77)	25 (77)	25 (77)	25 (77)	24 (76)	24 (76)	24 (76)	25 (77)	25 (77)
Average precipitation days	3	3	3	5	8	6	4	7	6	6	5	4	60
Source: Weatherbase

== Demographics ==
There are 270 inhabitants, most sharing one of two last names. It is inhabited predominantly by descendants of African slaves brought by the Spanish Colonizers after conquering the Americas.

== Guerrilla presence ==
Due to military tension the FARC guerillas, including the FARC's Frente 57, were forced to take refuge across their own border in Panama's Darién region. In June 1999 the guerrillas briefly took over the border settlement of Sapzurro.

== Etymology ==
Origins of the word Sapzurro come from the ancient language of the Guna people and means "Bahia Profunda" (deep bay).

== Gallery ==
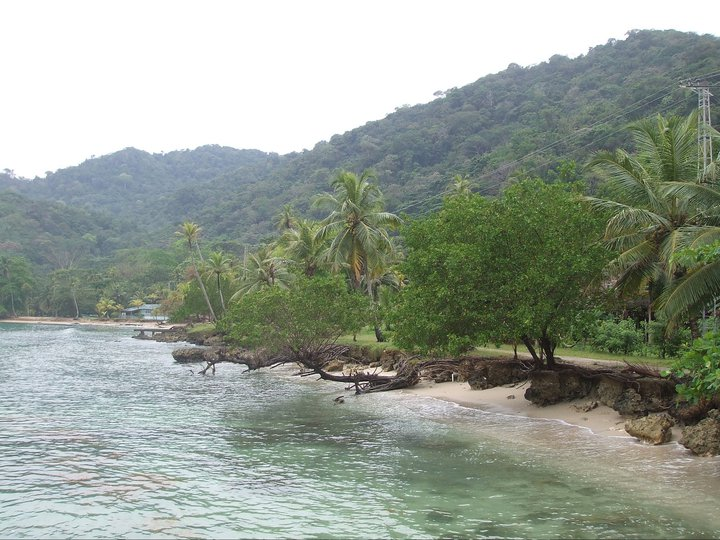
Main bay of Sapzurro, Colombia

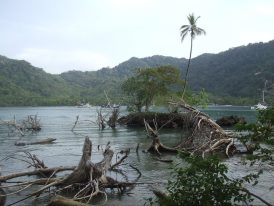
Underwater trees Sapzurro, Colombia

== See also ==
- Darién Gap
