= Watermelon Riot =

1856 riot in Panama City

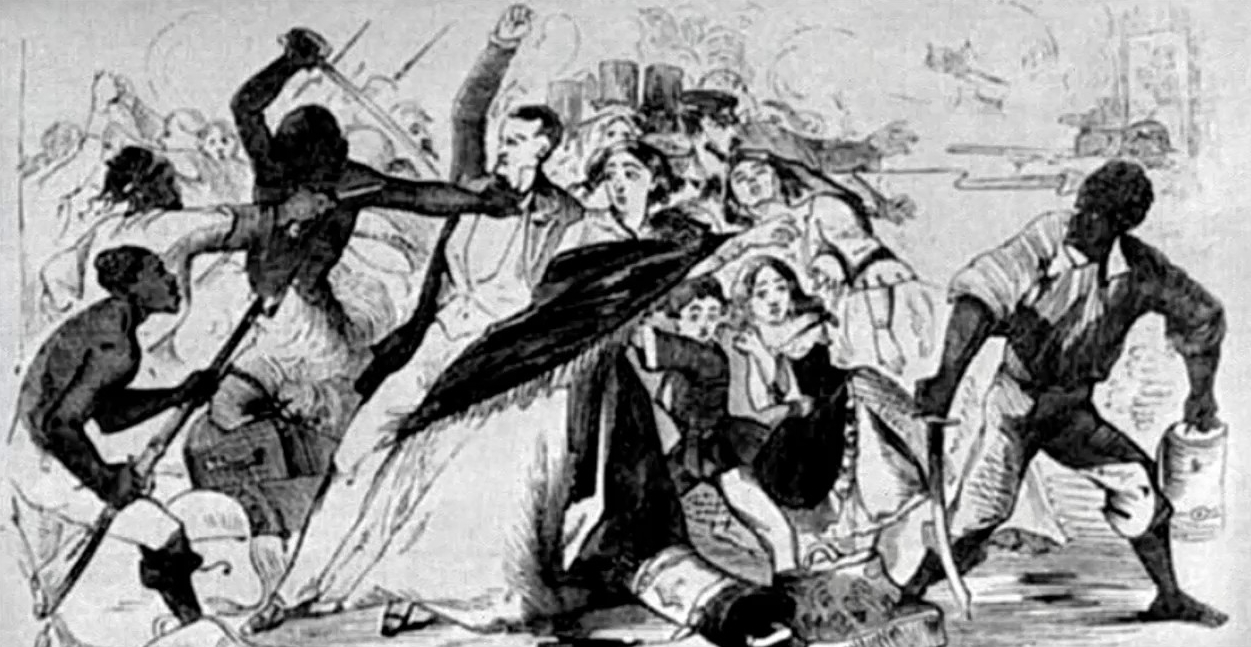
American press depiction of the "Watermelon Riot"

The Watermelon Riot was a riot that occurred on the evening of April 15, 1856, in Panama City, then the capital of the State of Panama in the Republic of New Granada. After an American took a slice of watermelon from a street vendor and refused to pay for it, a verbal altercation ensued and then quickly escalated when shots were fired. An angry mob of locals converged on the site and began fighting with the Americans. Before order could be restored, at least fifteen Americans and two Panamanians were killed. American businesses, including the railroad station, were extensively damaged or destroyed.

== Background ==
Throughout the 19th century, the United States’ involvement in the isthmus of Panama increased as it became the most convenient area in Central America for quick transoceanic transit. U.S. expansion westward accelerated after the Mexican–American War and the California Gold Rush, and transiting the isthmus provided faster access to the Pacific during a time crossing American mid-west and western regions was difficult and often dangerous. This led to recurrent negotiations between the governments of the Republic of New Granada, of which Panama was a part, and the U.S. The focus of these early negotiations was on rights and protections concerning the free transfer of goods and people through the isthmus. The most important treaty resulting from these negotiations was the Mallarino-Bidlack treaty of 1846 in which the Republic of New Granada recognized that the United States could intervene to guarantee the neutrality of the isthmus.

This clause, originally meant to protect against foreign control over the isthmus, was eventually interpreted to permit U.S. interventions to protect American interests against any dangers resulting from local disturbances or the many civil wars that plagued New Granada. Until the construction of the Panama Canal, the United States’ main concern on the isthmus was the protection of the Panama Railway that was completed in 1855.

Prior to the completion of the railroad, the local economy was dependent on the transport of goods and passengers via riverboats and mule trains. The railroad caused severe economic dislocation for many Panamanians who were involved in this business. The loss of their livelihood caused resentment against the railroad and Americans in general.

== The Riot ==
On the afternoon of April 15, 1856, a train arrived in Panama City carrying 1,000 California-bound passengers, including a sizable minority of women and children. The low tide at the time of their arrival prevented them from immediately boarding the US steamship, John L. Stephens, scheduled to leave for San Francisco once passengers and goods were loaded. While waiting for the tide to rise, a number of passengers explored the surrounding area of La Cienaga, a poor neighborhood that was home to freed slaves, laborers, artisans, and new immigrants.

The incident started at about 6 p.m., when a group of three or four American passengers confronted a fruit vendor, Jose Manuel Luna, near the train station. One of the passengers, possibly named Jack Oliver, took a slice of watermelon and then refused to pay for it. After a verbal exchange, Oliver pulled out a gun and Luna approached with a knife. One of the other passengers stepped in and paid Luna for the fruit. Immediately afterwards, Miguel Habrahan dashed out from a gathering crowd of locals, wrested the gun from Oliver and ran into the surrounding neighborhood. Shortly afterwards, hundreds of men armed with machetes, stones, and other weapons gathered and began fighting with the Americans who fought back with their guns and other weapons.

Initial fighting was focused around the American-owned businesses in La Cienaga. Within a few hours, the Pacific House, the Ocean Hotel, and MacAllister's store were totally destroyed. After a brief lull in the violence, a second outburst erupted against the railroad station where most of the Americans had fled. This time, the mob was joined by the Panama City police who attempted to gain control of the situation but were then ordered by the acting provincial governor, Francisco de Fabrega, to attack the station. Most of the fatalities that night occurred once the police and mob had fought their way into the building. The railroad station was destroyed, sections of railroad tracks were torn up, and telegraph lines were severed. The violence in and around the station ended around dawn.

The US consul at Panama City reported that 15 Americans had been killed and at least fifty more were wounded in the melee. In addition, two Panamanians were killed and another thirteen wounded.

== Aftermath ==
In the aftermath of the riot, both countries initiated investigations to determine the causes. The United States appointed Amos Corwine to prepare a report for the State Department. Corwine was a former US consul in Panama City and his brother worked for the Pacific Mail Steamship Company, which had substantial business interests in Panama. Corwine's final report blamed Miguel Habrahan who had stolen the gun from Oliver and signaled to the "native negros" to launch a premeditated attack with the connivance of Panama officials.

The investigation on behalf of Nueva Granada was led by Lino de Pombo, the minister of foreign affairs, and Florentino Gonzalez. Their report called the riot a spontaneous uprising triggered by Oliver and exacerbated by previous abuse from the Americans. They also pointed to the presence of American filibusters in Panama City and recent job losses accompanying the completion of the railroad as contributing factors. They denied any premeditation or connivance with Panama officials.

Corwine recommended in his report "the immediate occupation of the isthmus." On September 19, a detachment of 160 soldiers took possession of the railway station. The city was calm and three days later the troops moved back without having fired a single shot. According to the US, this brief occupation was justified under Article 35 of the Mallarino-Bidlack Agreement to safeguard the neutrality and free transit of Panama. Ultimately, this proved to be just the first of several US interventions in Panama.

The United States sought reparations from New Grenada for damages and losses suffered during the riot. The resulting Cass-Herran Treaty was ratified in 1858. New Grenada acknowledged liability for its failure to maintain peace. A commission was established to review claims and some $500,000 was awarded to US citizens seeking damages.
