= Pedro Pérez =

Pedro Pérez may refer to:

- Pedro Pérez (baseball) (Pedro Pérez Delgado, 1936–2022), Cuban baseball pitcher and coach
- Pedro Pérez (bishop) (fl. 13th century), Spanish prelate of the Roman Catholic Church, first bishop of Badajoz
- Pedro Pérez Clotet (1902–1966), Spanish poet, member of the Generation of '27
- Pedro Pérez Conde (born 1988), Spanish footballer
- Pedro Pérez Cordero ("Pedro Sienna", 1893–1972), Chilean playwright, poet and film maker
- Pedro Pérez Delgado ("Maisanta", 1881–1924), Venezuelan revolutionary and politician
- Pedro Pérez Dueñas (1952–2018), Cuban athlete, triple-jump world record holder
- Pedro Pérez Fernández (1885–1956), Spanish dramatist
- Pedro Pérez Fernández (economist) (1949–2018), Spanish economist
- Pedro Pérez de Guzmán (1901–1979), Spanish footballer, naval officer and politician
- Pedro Pérez de Guzmán, 1st Count of Olivares (1503–1569), Spanish nobleman
- Pedro Pérez Ibarra (1919–2006), Mexican trade-unionist and politician, represented the 1st federal electoral district of Tamaulipas
- Pedro Pérez Pimentel (1904–1990), Puerto Rican jurist, chief justice of the Supreme Court
- Pedro Pérez Sarduy (born 1943), Cuban writer and broadcaster
- Pedro Pérez Zeledón (1854–1930), Costa Rican diplomat and jurist, three-time minister of foreign affairs
- Pedro Agustín Pérez (1844–1914), Cuban independence activist
- Pedro Pablo Pérez (born 1977), Cuban racing cyclist
- Pedro Saúl Pérez (c. 1953 – 2007), Dominican human rights advocate, active in Puerto Rico

Where Pérez is the second surname:

- Pedro Avilés Pérez (1931–1978), Mexican drug trafficker
- Pedro Godoy Pérez (1886–1944), Chilean politician
- Pedro Porras Pérez (born 1959), Mexican politician
