= Burning of Colón =

1885 event of the Colombian Civil War

- Part of 1885 Colombia civil strife and Panama crisis of 1885
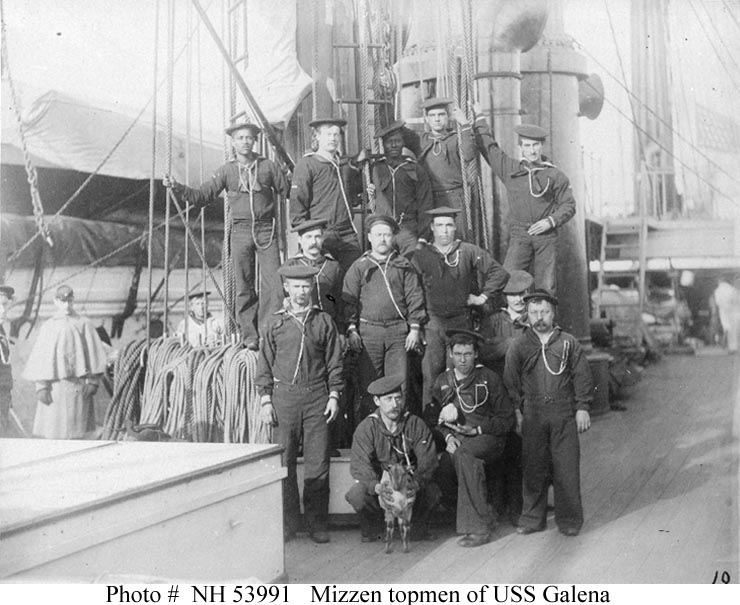
- Sailors of the USS Galena in the 1880s
Date	March 30 – April 1885
Location	Colón, Colombia
Result	Colón destroyed, rebels retreat American hostages released

Belligerents
(Colombia) Colombia; Supported by: Chile	(Colombia) Panamanian rebels	United States

Commanders and leaders
(Colombia) Rafael Núñez; Ramón Santodomingo Vila	(Colombia) Rafael Aizpuru; Pedro Prestan	(United States) Grover Cleveland; James Edward Jouett; Theodore Kane

Strength
unknown	~100 militia 1 artillery piece	Land: ~500 marines ~200 sailors 2 artillery pieces Sea: 1 frigate 1 steamer
- Casualties 18 killed

The Burning of Colón, or the Panama Incident, was a major event of the Colombian Civil War of 1885. Panamanian rebels loyal to Pedro Prestan destroyed the city by committing arson before retreating from a battle with federal Colombian troops. The episode also included a landing by United States Navy sailors and marines from two warships after the rebels seized American citizens.

== Incident ==
In the late 1800s Colombia's political situation was in turmoil as revolution and riots plagued the country. In 1885, another revolution began which spilled into the Isthmus of Panama, at the time a province of Colombia. The strife occurred during the initial attempt by French contractors to build a canal across the isthmus between the Atlantic and Pacific coasts. Colón was the site of the Atlantic entrance to the proposed canal, and French, American, and many other national interests occupied the area.

On or about March 16, the rebel leader Pedro Prestan occupied the small port of Colón on the Caribbean coast where he was waiting for a shipment of weapons by the American merchant ship Colon of the Pacific Mail Steamship Company. On March 26, Captain John M. Dow, representing the Pacific Mail Steamship Company in Colón, received a letter from the Panamanian sub-Secretary of State informing him that the offloading of any weapons intended for rebels was strictly prohibited. On the following day, Captain Dow received another letter from Secretary General Gomina which advised that he had assumed the position of commander-in-chief of civil and military affairs and should any of the weapons be removed from the Colon then the agent responsible for their delivery might attempt to seek asylum from the American or French naval forces present. Dow then informed the United States consul, Mr. Wright, who relayed orders from the consul-general, Mr. Adamson, not to allow any weapons to be offloaded without the permission of the consulate or Captain Theodore Kane of the steamer USS Galena, which happened to be in port at the time.

So on March 29, when the Colon arrived at Colón with fifty-two packages marked "M", Captain Dow assumed command and ordered that nothing be taken off the ship. This angered Prestan when he came to pick up his delivery and Dow and three others were then taken under arrest by rebel militiamen; one of the captives was a United States Navy lieutenant named Judd.

When Captain Kane learned of the arrests, negotiations began between the two parties. Prestan wanted his guns and Kane wanted the American citizens to be released, but the captain could not use force as it meant risking the lives of the prisoners. Rebel forces included at least 100 men, around twenty of whom accompanied Prestan at all times and fortified a small position within the city streets. The remaining men were based outside of town at Monkey Hill. The rebels had an old cannon as well and threatened to open fire on the Galena if she approached the shore. Prestan also declared that if he was forced to retreat, he would destroy the city with dynamite.

For several hours, until the next day, the negotiations proceeded, but the Americans still refused to give Prestan the cargo of weapons. Meanwhile, Dow and the other prisoners were taken to the Panamanian base to be executed by a firing squad. Soon after, Mr. Wright ordered that the weapons be given up as it was the only means of releasing the hostages. Unknowingly, Kane was distracting the rebels while the Colombian Army approached Colón. Eventually Prestan became alarmed and supposedly ordered his men to begin burning the city, but it was later determined that he never gave any such order; each party blamed the other for starting the fire, for which Prestán was hanged and later absolved by "resolución No. 101-30-48 de 24 de Septiembre").

Shortly thereafter the Colombian federals launched their attack. For a few hours the Panamanians held their position while the city burned around them until they were finally routed during the last Colombian charge. A detachment of about 100 marines and sailors from the Galena then landed at the request of the Colombian government and 600 more men and two cannons from the USS Tennessee arrived within the next few days. Admiral James Edward Jouett assumed command of the American forces which were tasked with protecting American property. This was hard because the fire quickly spread throughout Colón, causing great damage. Several of the destroyed buildings were American- or European-owned and damages amounted to the millions, though compensation was never paid.

Colón burned for days and the American garrison withdrew without doing much to save the city. United States citizens were also evacuated along with other foreign nationals. The American government responded to the incident by sending men to occupy both Colón, for a second time, and the city of Panama. There were no American casualties but between the Panamanians and the Colombians, eighteen people were killed and many more were wounded in action or in the fire.

In response to the American intervention, Chile sent the protected cruiser Esmeralda to Panama City, arriving on April 28. The Esmeralda's captain was ordered to stop by any means an eventual annexation of Panama by the United States. According to a U.S. publication in August 1885, right after the Panama events, "[The Esmeralda] could destroy our whole navy, ship by ship and never be touched once." By the time the Esmeralda arrived to Panama, however, the conflict had already been resolved as the United States withdrew from Panama and the Colombian government retook control of the city on April 30.
