= Mallarino–Bidlack Treaty =

1846 US-New Granada treaty on the Panamanian isthmus

The Mallarino–Bidlack Treaty (also known as the Bidlack Treaty and Treaty of New Granada) was a treaty signed between New Granada (today Colombia and Panama) and the United States, on December 12, 1846. U.S. diplomat Benjamin Alden Bidlack negotiated the pact with New Granada's commissioner Manuel María Mallarino.

Officially, it was entitled Tratado de Paz, Amistad, Navegación y Comercio (Treaty of Peace, Friendship, Commerce and Navigation), and was meant to represent an agreement of mutual cooperation. It granted the U.S. significant transit rights over the Panamanian isthmus, as well as military powers to suppress social conflicts and independence struggles targeted against Colombia. Under the Bidlack-Mallarino Treaty, the U.S. intervened militarily many times on the isthmus, usually against civilians, peasant guerrillas, or Liberal Party independence struggles. After the beginning of the California Gold Rush of 1848, the U.S. spent seven years constructing a trans-isthmian Panama Railway. The result of the treaty, however, was to give the United States a legal opening in politically and economically influencing the Panama isthmus, which was part of New Granada at the time, but was later to become the independent country of Panama in accordance with the wishes of the United States. In 1903, however, the United States failed to gain access to a strip on the isthmus for the construction of a canal, and reversed its position on Panamanian secession from the Republic of Colombia.

== See also ==
- Panama Canal
- Latin America – United States relations
- List of United States treaties
