= Santa Fe District, Darién =

Santa Fe
- District
- Location of Santa Fe District in Darién Province
- Coordinates: 8.7°N 78.2°W
- Country: Panama
- Province: Darién
- Established: 14 February 2018
- Seat: Santa Fe

Government
  - Mayor: Efren Ibarguen Martínez

Area
  - Total: 2,683.6 km^{2} (1,036.1 sq mi)

Population (2010 Census)
  - Total: 16,089
  - Estimate (2020): 16,981
  - Density: 5.9953/km^{2} (15.528/sq mi)
- Time zone: UTC-5 (ETZ)

Santa Fe is a district in the Panamanian province of Darién, located approximately 155 kilometres (96 mi) east of Panama City. The district seat is located at Santa Fe.

== Geography ==
Santa Fe is located in the northwestern part of Darién Province on the north side of the Bay of San Miguel and the Tuira River. It borders the districts of Pinogana (including the corregimiento-level comarca indígena of Wargandí) and Chepigana in Darién Province to the east and south respectively, and the districts of Chimán and Chepo in Panamá Province to the west and north respectively. The municipality covers an area of 2,683.6 square kilometres (1,036.1 sq mi).

== History ==
On 14 July 2017, the National Assembly decreed the creation of Santa Fe District from corregimientos previously part of Chepigana District. The decree was amended on 14 February 2018 to take effect retroactive to 31 October 2017.

== Administration ==
Santa Fe District is divided into seven corregimientos:

- Agua Fría
- Cucunatí
- Río Congo
- Río Congo Arriba
- Río Iglesias
- Santa Fe
- Zapallal

Santa Fe elected its first mayor, Efren Ibarguen Martínez, in 2019.

== Demographics ==
In the 2010 Census of Panama, the corregimientos that make up the current Santa Fe District recorded a population of 16,089 inhabitants living in 4232 households. The National Institute of Statistics and Census of Panama projected the population of these corregimientos to reach 16,981 by the year 2020.

== Economy and infrastructure ==
The main economic activities in Santa Fe are agriculture and fishing. Agriculture primarily takes place near the Pan-American Highway which traverses the eastern part of the district. Cattle ranching is the main agricultural activity, but corn, rice and yams are also produced. Artisanal-scale fishing for shrimp, lobster, clams, and oysters takes place in the coastal communities of Cucunatí and Río Congo.
