= Inhambupe =

Municipality of Bahia, Brazil

- Municipality
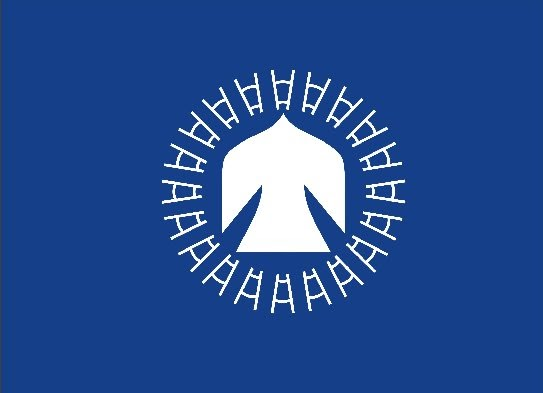
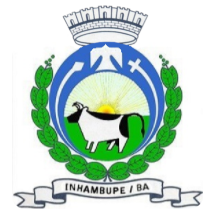
- Flag Coat of arms

- Municipal location in Bahia

- Location in Brazil
- Coordinates: 11°47′S 38°21′W
- Country: Brazil
- Region: Nordeste
- State: Bahia

Population (2020)
  - Total: 40,333
- Time zone: UTC−3 (BRT)

Inhambupe is a municipality in the state of Bahia in the North-East region of Brazil. The town lies along Highway 110, approximately 161 kilometres (100 mi) by road north of Salvador. In 2022 it had an estimated 33,790 inhabitants.

== History ==
Between 1572 and 1582, an indigenous catechesis grew on the left bank of the Inhambupe River (Rio Inhambupe de Cima). The Jesuits opened a school in nearby Água Fria. The Marshal of the Casa da Torre dos Garcia D'Ávila erected a church of the Divine Holy Spirit in Inhambupe in the 1620s.

From 1718, the village was part of the Parish of Água Fria, but on April 24, 1728 Vasco Fernandes Cézar de Menezes elevated Inhambupe to the status of town. The parish of Inhambupe was formally established on November 7, 1816.

According to local tradition, at the end of the 19th century, the mystic Antônio Conselheiro passed through the city, before the War of Canudos. Municipal Law No.1 of 20 October 1909 established the districts of Barreiro, Bebedouro, Caetitú, Calumbi, Caueira, Curralinho, Encantado, Gibóia, Jacu, Junco, Lagoa, Mulungu, Recreio and Tanquinho. In 1933, it was reduced to 4 districts: Inhambupe, Aporá, Itapororocas and Sátiro Dias. Itapororocas was replaced with Itamira (formerly Serra do Aporã) district in 1938. By State Law No. 1021 of 14 August 1958, the districts of Aporá and Itamira became part of the new Municipality of Aporá.

== Geography ==
The town lies along Highway 110, approximately 161 kilometres (100 mi) by road north of Salvador and about 75 kilometres (47 mi) west from the coast. The Inhambupe and Itapicuru rivers flow through the municipality.

== Economy and health ==
The area is a producer of cassava. The average GDP for capita in 2021 was 15.368,34 R$.

The average infant mortality in Inhambupe is 17.24 per 1,000 live births, which is ranked 144th out of 417 municipalities in the state, and 1510th out of 5570 nationwide.

== Landmarks ==
- Igreja Evangélica Assembleia De Deus - church

== Notable people ==
- Antônio Luís Pereira da Cunha (1760-1837), the first and only viscount of Inhambupe, later Marquis of Inhambupe. He was a judge and politician, though was born in Salvador.

== See also ==
- List of municipalities in Bahia
