= Agua Fria =

Agua Fria, Agua Fría, or Água Fria (all meaning "cold water") may refer to:

== Brazil ==
- Água Fria de Goiás, a municipality in northern Goiás state
- Água Fria, a municipality in the state of Bahia

== Panama ==
- Agua Fría, Panama (Darién Province)

== United States ==
- Agua Fria, New Mexico, a suburb of Santa Fe
- Agua Fria, California, a ghost town
- In Arizona:
  - Agua Fria, Arizona
  - Agua Fria National Monument, Arizona
  - Agua Fria Freeway, a part of Loop 101 in Metropolitan Phoenix, Arizona
  - Agua Fria River
