= Jaqué =

- Corregimiento
- Location within Panama
- Coordinates: 7°31′05″N 78°09′45″W
- Country: Panama
- Province: Darién
- District: Chepigana

Area
  - Land: 1,043.9 km^{2} (403.1 sq mi)

Population (2010)
  - Total: 2,386
  - Density: 2.3/km^{2} (6.0/sq mi)
- Population density calculated based on land area.
- Time zone: UTC−5 (EST)

Jaqué is a corregimiento in Chepigana District, Darién Province, Panama, located 38 kilometres (24 mi) west of the Panama-Colombia border. The closest neighboring settlement is Puerto Piña, that is about 8 kilometres (5.0 mi) north.

== Transportation ==
Jaqué is within the Darién Gap of the Pan American Highway, and no permanent roads connect it with the rest of Panama. The main means of transportations are by plane and by boat. The town is served by the Jaqué Airport.

== Geography ==
Jaqué is on the Pacific coast next to the mouth of the Jaqué River in Darién Province. The immediate area around Jaqué is mainly low lying with mangrove swamps and tropical rain forest. Further inland are highlands with temperate broadleaf and mixed forests.

=== Climate ===
Jaqué has a tropical monsoon climate (Köppen Am). The mean temperature is 26.6 °C (79.9 °F) with a record high of 37 °C or 98.6 °F and low of 15 °C or 59 °F. The hottest month is March with a mean of 27.1 °C or 80.8 °F, and the coolest December with an average of 26 °C or 78.8 °F The two seasons are the wet season and the dry season. The wet season starts in April until December with 2,736 millimetres (107.72 in) of rainfall on average. The dry starts in January lasting until March. The amount of precipitation drops drastically to less than 30 millimetres (1.18 in) in February and March with an average dry season total of 119.9 millimetres (4.72 in). On average there are 114 days with rain a year. Humidity is usually high at or above 80 percent year round with an average of 85.8 percent. March during the dry season being the lowest at 81.6 percent, and September during the wet season being the highest at 88.2 percent.

Climate data for Jaqué, Darién, Panama
Month	Jan	Feb	Mar	Apr	May	Jun	Jul	Aug	Sep	Oct	Nov	Dec	Year
Record high °C (°F)	35.4 (95.7)	35.5 (95.9)	37.0 (98.6)	35.0 (95.0)	36.0 (96.8)	33.0 (91.4)	33.5 (92.3)	34.0 (93.2)	31.5 (88.7)	33.2 (91.8)	33.2 (91.8)	34.0 (93.2)	37.0 (98.6)
Daily mean °C (°F)	26.9 (80.4)	26.9 (80.4)	27.1 (80.8)	27.0 (80.6)	26.8 (80.2)	26.5 (79.7)	26.4 (79.5)	26.4 (79.5)	26.3 (79.3)	26.1 (79.0)	26.5 (79.7)	26.0 (78.8)	26.6 (79.8)
Record low °C (°F)	16.3 (61.3)	17.5 (63.5)	18.5 (65.3)	19.2 (66.6)	15.0 (59.0)	18.0 (64.4)	19.5 (67.1)	18.9 (66.0)	19.0 (66.2)	19.5 (67.1)	17.2 (63.0)	20.0 (68.0)	15.0 (59.0)
Average rainfall mm (inches)	66.5 (2.62)	28.7 (1.13)	24.7 (0.97)	124.2 (4.89)	285.0 (11.22)	320.0 (12.60)	319.3 (12.57)	281.9 (11.10)	379.4 (14.94)	490.9 (19.33)	385.2 (15.17)	150.1 (5.91)	2,855.9 (112.45)
Average rainy days (≥ mm 0.1)	5	7	6	9	11	9	10	13	13	13	9	9	114
Average relative humidity (%)	82.4	82.2	81.6	84.7	86.6	87.6	87.0	87.5	88.2	87.6	88.0	86.2	85.8
Source: Datos Climáticos Históricos (Historical Climate Data)

== Demographics ==
Jaqué had a population of 2,386 people as of 2010; with an estimated population of 2,882 people in 2015. Its population as of 1990 was 1,819 people; its population as of 2000 was 2,244 people.

Population history^{(census)}
Year	Pop.	±%
1990	1,819	—
2000	2,244	+23.4%
2010	2,386	+6.3%
National Institute of Statistics and Census of Panama

Historical populations ^{(estimate)}

Year	Pop.	±%
2000	2,398	—
2001	2,439	+1.7%
2002	2,476	+1.5%
2003	2,513	+1.5%
2004	2,548	+1.4%
2005	2,584	+1.4%
2006	2,621	+1.4%
2007	2,658	+1.4%

Year	Pop.	±%
2008	2,694	+1.4%
2009	2,729	+1.3%
2010	2,762	+1.2%
2011	2,789	+1.0%
2012	2,813	+0.9%
2013	2,835	+0.8%
2014	2,857	+0.8%
2015	2,882	+0.9%

Comptroller of the Republic
