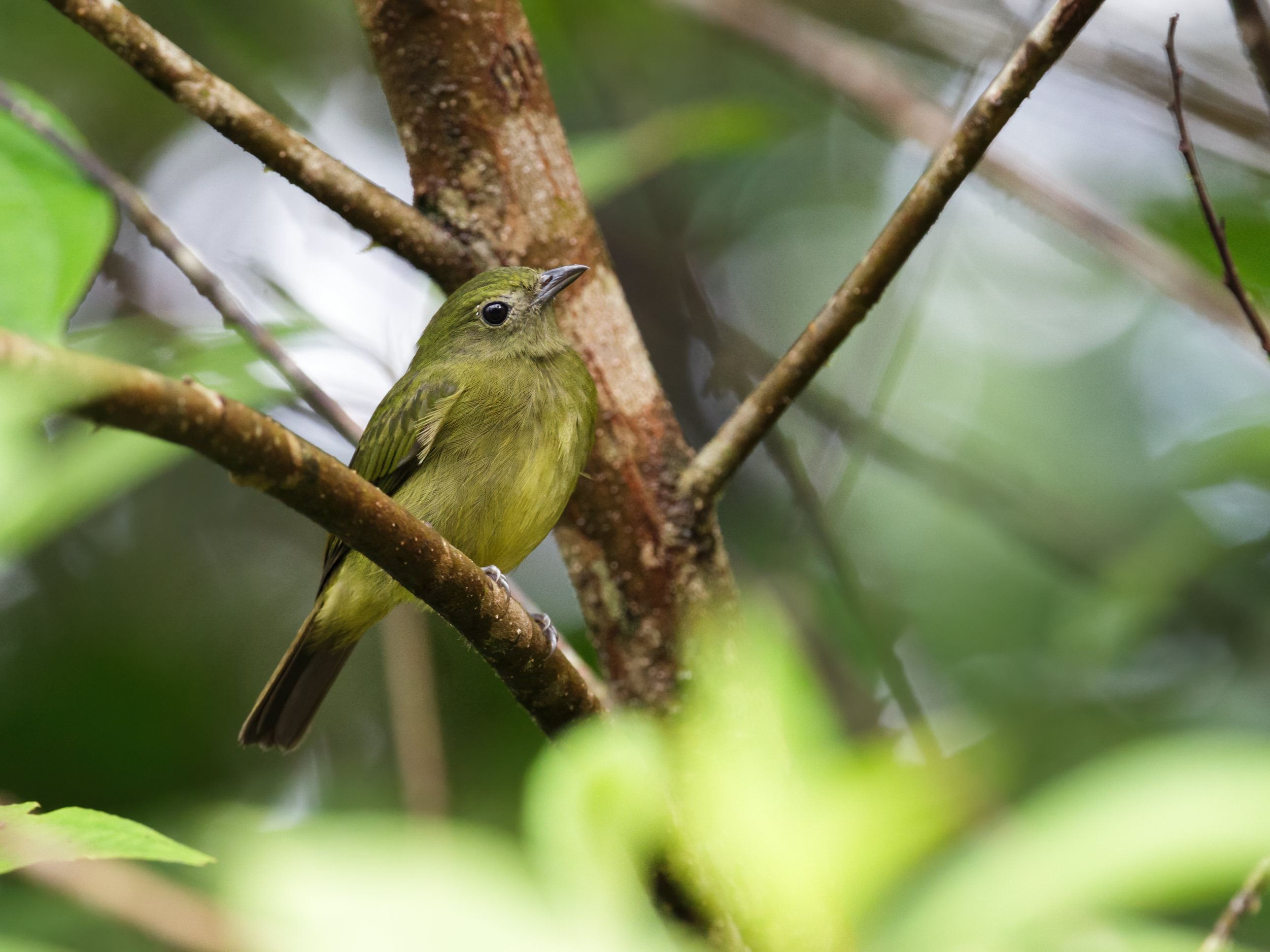

Conservation status
- Least Concern (IUCN 3.1)

Scientific classification
- Kingdom: Animalia
- Phylum: Chordata
- Class: Aves
- Order: Passeriformes
- Family: Pipridae
- Genus: Cryptopipo
- Species: C. litae

Binomial name
- Cryptopipo litae (Hellmayr, 1906)

= Choco manakin =

Species of bird

The Choco manakin (Cryptopipo litae) is a species of bird in the family Pipridae. It is found in Colombia, Ecuador, and Panama.

== Taxonomy and systematics ==
The Choco manakin was originally described as Chloropipo holochlora litae, a subspecies of the green manakin. During much of the twentieth century it was placed in genus Xenopipo. However, a study published in 2013 showed that Xenopipo was polyphyletic and proposed a new genus Cryptopipo for the green manakin. Taxonomic systems soon adopted the reassignment.

By 2023 many taxonomic systems had separated the Choco manakin as C. litae from the green manakin C. holochlora. However, as of October 2025 the North American Classification Committee of the American Ornithological Society and the independent South American Classification Committee have not recognized the Choco manakin.

According to the IOC, the Clements taxonomy, and BirdLife International's Handbook of the Birds of the World the Choco manakin has two subspecies, the nominate C. l. litae (Hellmayr, 1906) and C. l. suffusa (Griscom, 1932).

== Description ==
The Choco manakin is 11 to 13 cm (4.3 to 5.1 in) long and weighs 15 to 21 g (0.53 to 0.74 oz). The sexes are alike. Adults of the nominate subspecies have a pale olivaceous green head, upperparts, and central tail feathers. Their wings and outer tail feathers are dusky or brownish with moss green outer edges. Their throat, breast, flanks and undertail coverts are olive and their chin and central belly are pale yellowish. They have a brown to dark brown iris with a pale ring around the eye, a black maxilla, a dark gray mandible, and highly variable legs and feet with shades of gray to blackish to brown. Subspecies C. l. suffusa is "very much darker throughout" than the nominate with a brighter yellow belly.

== Distribution and habitat ==
Subspecies C. l. suffusa of the Choco manakin is the more northerly of the two. It is found from eastern Guna Yala (formerly San Blas Province) and eastern Darién Province in eastern Panama south into northwestern Colombia. The nominate subspecies is found west of the Andes from northwestern Colombia south into northwestern Ecuador as far as Santo Domingo de los Tsáchilas and Pichincha provinces. It might also be found in the northern part of Colombia's Central Andes though that population might be of subspecies C. l. suffusa. The species inhabits the undergrowth to the mid-story of humid to wet evergreen forest in the lowlands and foothills. In elevation it ranges from near sea level to 1,200 m (3,900 ft) in Colombia and to 1,100 m (3,600 ft) in Ecuador.

== Behavior ==
=== Movement ===
The Choco manakin is believed to be a year-round resident.

=== Feeding ===
The Choco manakin's diet has not been detailed but is known to include fruit, with that of Anthurium species apparently preferred. It also takes insects. It usually takes fruit with a brief hover at the end of a short flight from a perch.

=== Breeding ===
The Choco manakin's breeding season has not been fully defined but includes at least June to August in Panama, September to November and February to May in Ecuador, and March to May in Colombia. One nest was a shallow cup made mostly of rootlets with moss and dead leaves dangling below it. It was attached in a branch fork with spider web about 2 m (7 ft) above a stream. The clutch is thought to be one egg. Females alone are thought to build the nest, incubate the clutch, and care for nestlings. Nothing else is known about the species' breeding biology.

=== Vocalization ===
What is thought to be the Choco manakin's song is "a high-pitched, thin whistle that starts with an initial short upward component...before descending more slowly". It also gives "a high-pitched, fast, sputtering rattle".

== Status ==
The IUCN has assessed the Choco manakin as being of Least Concern. It has a large range; its population size is not known and is believed to be decreasing. No immediate threats have been identified. It is considered uncommon in Colombia and uncommon to fairly common in Ecuador. It occurs in three protected areas in Colombia.
