= Jaqué Airport =

- IATA: JQE; ICAO: MPJE

Summary
- Airport type: Public
- Serves: Jaqué, Panama
- Elevation AMSL: 29 ft (8.8 m)
- Coordinates: 7°31′05″N 78°09′25″W

Map
- Location of the airport in Panama

Runways
Direction	Length		Surface
Direction	m	ft	Surface
13/31	850	2,789	Concrete
- Sources: GCM HERE Maps SkyVector

Jaqué Airport (IATA: JQE, ICAO: MPJE) is an airport serving Jaqué, a Pacific coastal town in the Darién Province of Panama.

The airport had 4350 feet of grass runway until sometime after 2003, when the ramp and approximately 850 metres (2,790 ft) of the runway were paved with concrete. Northwest approach and departure will cross the Jaqué River. There are distant hills along the coast northwest and southeast of the airport.

The La Palma VOR (Ident: PML) is located 53.4 nautical miles (99 km) north of the airport.

== See also ==
- Transport in Panama
- List of airports in Panama
