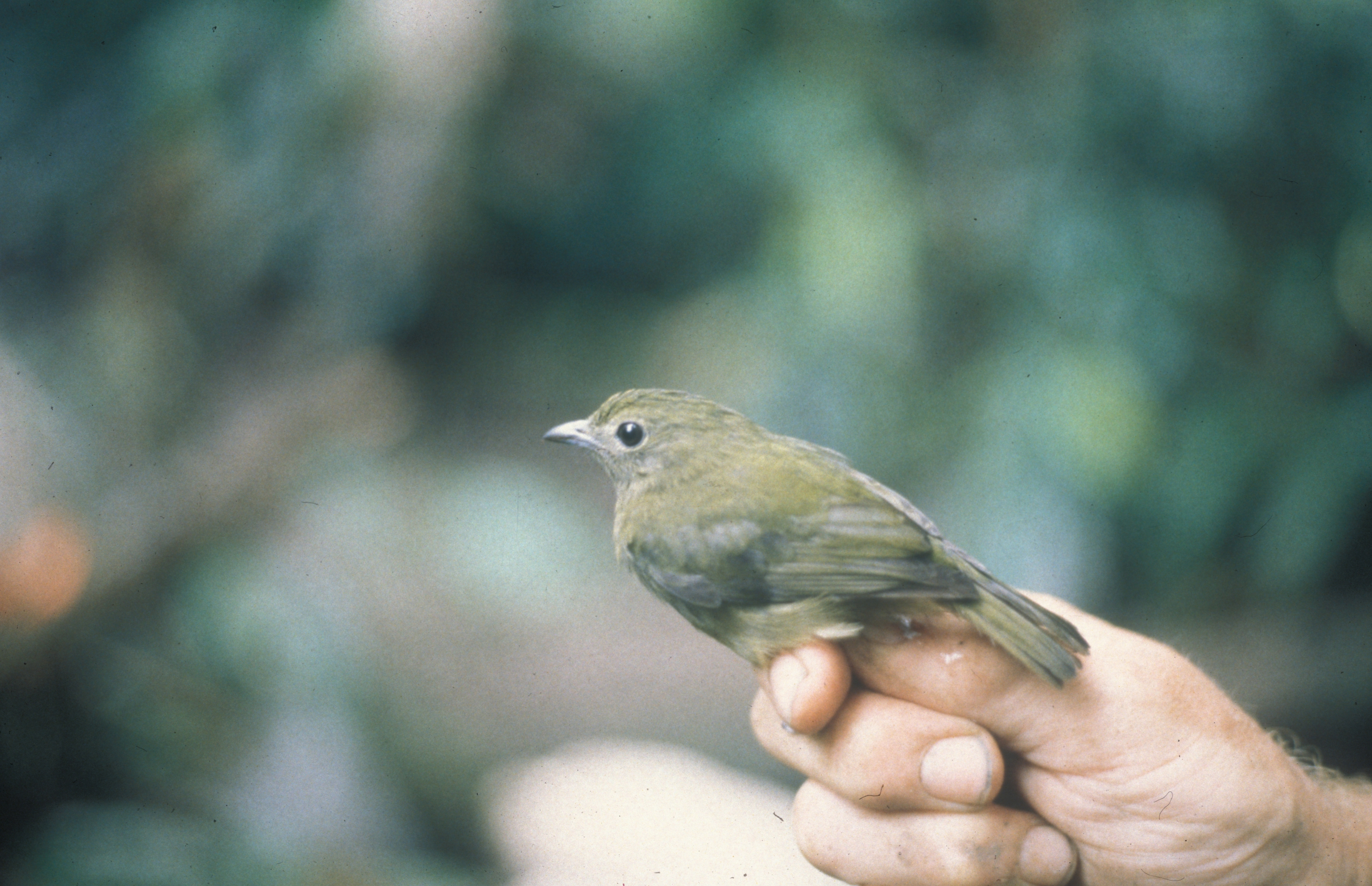

Conservation status
- Least Concern (IUCN 3.1)

Scientific classification
- Kingdom: Animalia
- Phylum: Chordata
- Class: Aves
- Order: Passeriformes
- Family: Pipridae
- Genus: Cryptopipo
- Species: C. holochlora

Binomial name
- Cryptopipo holochlora (Sclater, PL, 1888)

Synonyms
- Chloropipo holochlora; Xenopipo holochlora

= Green manakin =

Species of bird

The green manakin (Cryptopipo holochlora) is a species of bird in the family Pipridae. It is found in Colombia, Ecuador, and Peru.

== Taxonomy and systematics ==
The green manakin was originally described as Chloropipo holochlora. During much of the twentieth century it was placed in genus Xenopipo. However, a study published in 2013 showed that Xenopipo was polyphyletic and proposed a new genus Cryptopipo for the green manakin. Taxonomic systems soon adopted the reassignment.

Before the reassignment and for a time after it several systems assigned four subspecies to Crytopipo holochlora. By 2023 many had separated what is now the Choco manakin (C. litae) with two subspecies from C. holochlora. However, as of October 2025 the independent South American Classification Committee has not recognized the Choco manakin.

According to the IOC, the Clements taxonomy, and BirdLife International's Handbook of the Birds of the World the green manakin has two subspecies, the nominate C. h. holochlora (Sclater, PL, 1888) and C. h. viridior (Chapman, 1924).

== Description ==
The green manakin is 11 to 13 cm (4.3 to 5.1 in) long and weighs 10.6 to 18.3 g (0.37 to 0.65 oz). The sexes are alike. Adults of the nominate subspecies have a bright grass green head, upperparts, and central tail feathers. Their wings and outer tail feathers are dusky or brownish with green outer edges. Their throat, breast, flanks and undertail coverts are olive and their chin and central belly are pale yellowish. They have a brown to dark brown iris with a pale ring around the eye, a black maxilla, a dark gray mandible, and highly variable dark gray, pinkish gray, or blackish to brown legs and feet. Subspecies C. h. viridior is larger than the nominate, with brighter green upperparts, more and deeper yellow on the underparts, and dark brown to black bill.

== Distribution and habitat ==
The green manakin is found along the eastern slope of the Andes from Meta Department in central Colombia south through eastern Ecuador into Peru as far as eastern Junín Department. Subspecies C. h. viridior is found further south on the eastern Andean slope in Peru's Cuzco and Puno departments. The species inhabits the undergrowth to the mid-story of humid to wet terra firme forest. In elevation it occurs below 1,200 m (3,900 ft) in Colombia, mostly between 300 and 1,200 m (1,000 and 3,900 ft) in Ecuador, and between 400 and 1,100 m (1,300 and 3,600 ft) in Peru.

== Behavior ==
=== Movement ===
The green manakin is believed to be a year-round resident.

=== Feeding ===
The green manakin's diet has not been detailed but is known to include fruit, which probably is its major component with some insects also eaten. It usually takes fruit with a brief hover at the end of a short flight from a perch. It sometimes joins mixed-species feeding flocks.

=== Breeding ===
The green manakin's breeding season is not known but includes late July to November in southeastern Peru. Its one known nest was a shallow cup made mostly of rootlets with moss and dead leaves dangling below it. It was attached in a branch fork with spider web about 1.6 m (5 ft) above the ground and contained one egg. Nothing else is known about the species' breeding biology.

=== Vocalization ===
The green manakin is generally rather quiet. What is thought to be its song is described as "a high-pitched, thin whistle" and "a very high, rising tueee?". It also makes "a two-parted rattle, with the initial, shorter component a rough, lower buzz followed by a notably higher...longer, thinner rattle".

== Status ==
The IUCN has assessed the green manakin as being of Least Concern. It has a large range; its population size is not known and is believed to be decreasing. No immediate threats have been identified. It is considered uncommon in Colombia, uncommon to fairly common in Ecuador, and uncommon to locally fairly common in Peru. It occurs in several protected areas.
