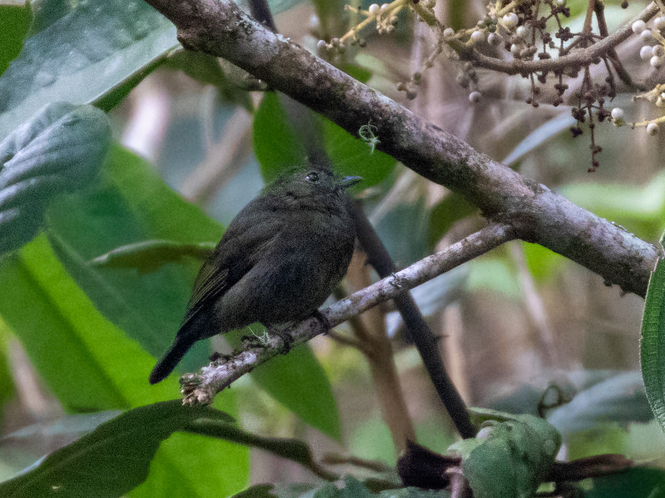

Conservation status
- Least Concern (IUCN 3.1)

Scientific classification
- Kingdom: Animalia
- Phylum: Chordata
- Class: Aves
- Order: Passeriformes
- Family: Pipridae
- Genus: Chloropipo
- Species: C. unicolor

Binomial name
- Chloropipo unicolor Taczanowski, 1884

Synonyms
- see text

= Jet manakin =

Species of bird

The jet manakin (Chloropipo unicolor) is a species of bird in the family Pipridae. It is found in Bolivia, Ecuador, and Peru.

== Taxonomy and systematics ==
The jet manakin was originally described as Chloropipo unicolor. During much of the twentieth century it was placed in genus Xenopipo. However, a study published in 2013 showed that Xenopipo was polyphyletic and proposed resurrecting genus Chloropipo for the jet and yellow-headed manakins. Taxonomic systems soon adopted the reassignments.

The jet manakin is monotypic.

== Description ==
The jet manakin is about 12 cm (4.7 in) long and weighs about 15.5 g (0.55 oz). The species is sexually dimorphic. Adult males are entirely black except for white underwing coverts. Adult females are mostly dark olive with a grayish olive throat and belly. Both sexes have a dark brown iris, a bluish gray to gray bill, and dark olive-gray to pinkish gray legs and feet.

== Distribution and habitat ==
The jet manakin is found intermittently on the eastern side of the Andes of Ecuador from Napo Province to Peru and then more contiguously south through Peru at least to Puno Department. Though most sources do not include Bolivia in the species' range, the independent South American Classification Committee has records in that country. The jet manakin inhabits humid montane forest in the tropical zone. In elevation it is found between 1,450 and 1,700 m (4,800 and 5,600 ft) in Ecuador and between 900 and 2,200 m (3,000 and 7,200 ft) in Peru.

== Behavior ==
=== Movement ===
The jet manakin is believed to be a year-round resident.

=== Feeding ===
The jet manakin's diet has not been detailed but is known to include fruit. It forages singly and sometimes in pairs from the understory to lower midstory or in fruiting trees at the forest's edge.

=== Breeding ===
Nothing is known about the jet manakin's breeding biology.

=== Vocalization ===
The jet manakin's call is "a rising, squeaky tueee?".

== Status ==
The IUCN has assessed the jet manakin as being of Least Concern. Its population size is not known and is believed to be decreasing. No immediate threats have been identified. It is considered local in Ecuador and "often fairly common" in Peru.
