= Garachiné Airport =

Garachiné Airport Aeropuerto de Garachiné
- IATA: GHE; ICAO: none

Summary
- Airport type: Public
- Serves: Garachiné, Panama
- Elevation AMSL: 42 ft / 13 m
- Coordinates: 8°03′54″N 78°22′01″W

Map
- Location in Panama

Runways
Direction	Length		Surface
Direction	m	ft	Surface
01/19	650	2,133	Concrete
- Sources: GCM Bing Maps

Garachiné Airport (IATA: GHE) is an airport serving the Pacific coastal town of Garachiné, in the Darién Province of Panama.

North approach and departure are over the water. There is mountainous terrain 3 kilometres (1.9 mi) south of the airport.

The La Palma VOR (Ident: PML) is located 24.7 nautical miles (46 km) north-northeast of the airport.

== See also ==
- Transport in Panama
- List of airports in Panama
