= Magno Alves =

Brazilian footballer (born 1976)

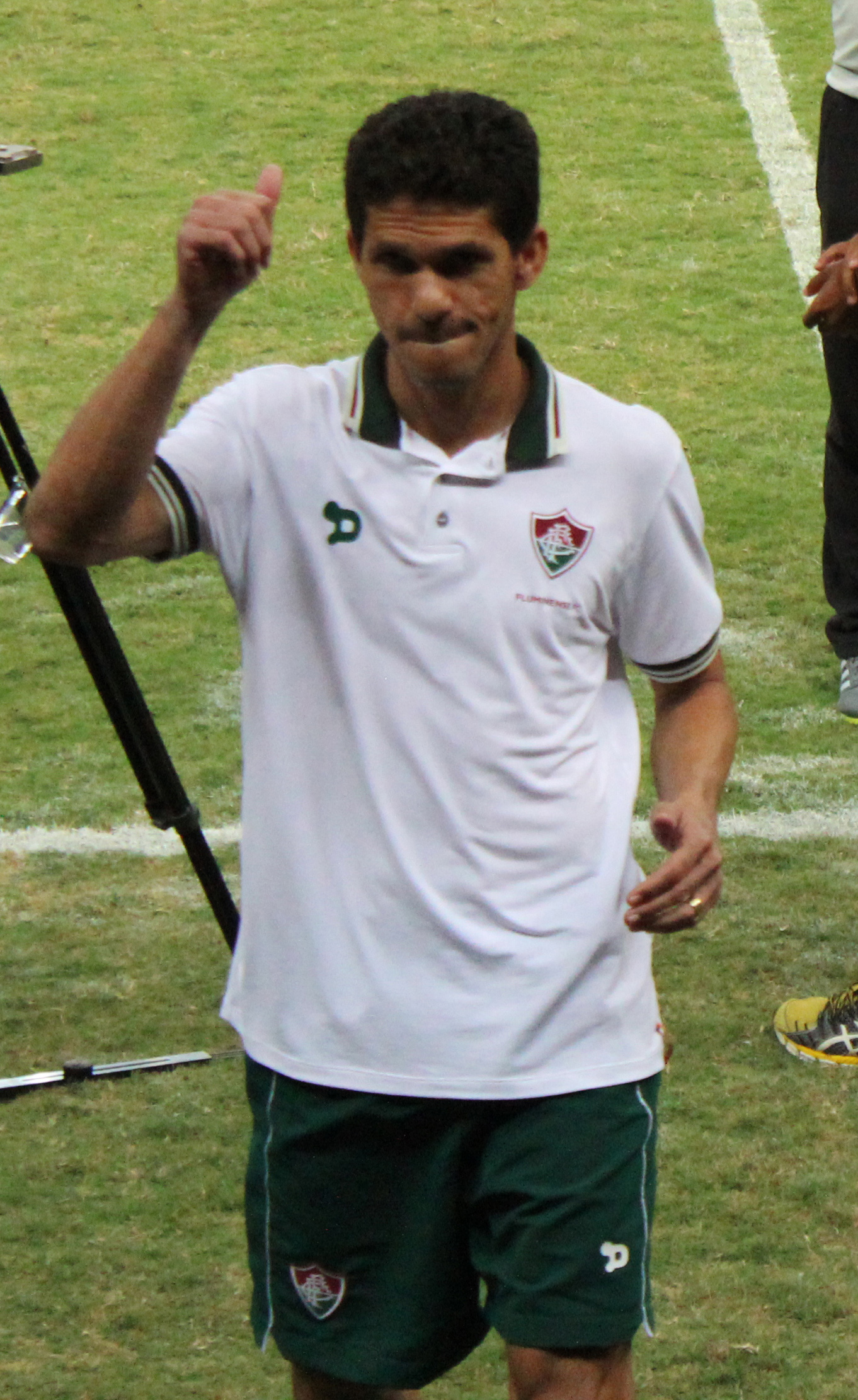
- Magno Alves in 2016

Personal information
- Full name: Magno Alves de Araújo
- Date of birth: 13 January 1976 (age 50)
- Place of birth: Aporá, Brazil
- Height: 1.76 m (5 ft 9 in)
- Position: Striker

Team information
- Current team: Atlético Cearense

Senior career*
Years	Team	Apps	(Gls)
1993–1995	Ratrans		
1995–1996	Valinhos		
1996–1997	Independente		
1997	Araçatuba		
1997	Criciúma	15	(8)
1998–2002	Fluminense	265	(111)
2003	Jeonbuk Hyundai	44	(27)
2004–2005	Oita Trinita	62	(29)
2006–2007	Gamba Osaka	53	(36)
2007–2008	Al-Ittihad	12	(9)
2008–2010	Umm-Salal	47	(36)
2010	Ceará	21	(9)
2011	Atlético Mineiro	44	(17)
2012	Umm Salal	11	(5)
2012	Sport	4	(0)
2012–2015	Ceará	149	(78)
2015–2016	Fluminense	54	(5)
2017	Ceará	36	(10)
2018	Grêmio Novorizontino	7	(0)
2018	Atlético Tubarão	9	(1)
2018–2019	Floresta	2	(0)
2020	Atlético de Alagoinhas	10	(4)
2020	Barcelona de Ilhéus	0	(0)
2020–2021	Caucaia	6	(0)
2025	Atlético Cearense	6	(2)
Total		857+	(387+)

International career
2001	Brazil	3	(0)
- * Club domestic league appearances and goals

Magno Alves de Araújo (born 13 January 1976) is a Brazilian former professional footballer who played as a striker.

He is also known by his nickname O Magnata (The Magnate).

== Career ==
Magno Alves was born in Aporá, Bahia, Brazil. Between 1998 and 2003, he made 265 appearances and scored 111 goals for Fluminense as a striker, winning the Rio State Championship in 2002. Alves' most famous match was against Santa Cruz. as he scored 5 goals, earning the nickname Magnata. After a short stint in the Korean Professional Football League (K-League), Alves joined Oita Trinita of the Japan Professional Football League (J1 League). In 2006, he joined J1 League champion, Gamba Osaka, as a replacement for the team's former ace striker Clemerson de Araújo Soares, who left the team for family reasons. He joined Saudi Arabian side Al-Ittihad after being sent away by Gamba Osaka due to disciplinary problems.

In July 2010, he signed a contract with Brazilian club Ceará.

He scored overall for Ceará 103 times in 224 matches, becoming the club's 6th goalscorer of all time.

Until 7 August 2021, he had scored 483+ goals in 986 official matches.

On 28 July 2022, Magno Alves was reported announcing his retirement from playing.

In 2025, Magno Alves returned briefly from retirement at the age of 49, to play alongside his son Pedrinho, for Atlético Cearense.

== Career statistics ==
=== Club ===
(Note: The stats he has in state leagues are not counted below, but they are counted in his infobox.)

Appearances and goals by club, season and competition
Club	Season	League			National Cup		League Cup		Continental		Total	
Club	Season	Division	Apps	Goals	Apps	Goals	Apps	Goals	Apps	Goals	Apps	Goals
Criciúma	1997	Série A	15	8							15	8
Fluminense	1998	Série B										
Fluminense	1999	Série C										
Fluminense	2000	Série A	23	19							23	19
Fluminense	2001	Série A	26	7							26	7
Fluminense	2002	Série A	23	10							23	10
Fluminense	Total		72	36							72	36
Jeonbuk Hyundai Motors	2003	K-League	44	27							44	27
Oita Trinita	2004	J1 League	29	11	2	2	6	1	-		37	14
Oita Trinita	2005	J1 League	33	18	2	2	3	0	-		38	20
Oita Trinita	Total		62	29	4	4	9	1	0	0	75	34
Gamba Osaka	2006	J1 League	31	26	5	3	2	0	6	8	44	37
Gamba Osaka	2007	J1 League	22	10	0	0	7	2	-		29	12
Gamba Osaka	Total		53	36	5	3	9	2	6	8	73	49
Al-Ittihad Jeddah	2007–08	Professional League	12	9					4	2	16	11
Umm-Salal	2008–09	Stars League	27	25	1	0	0	0	10	2	38	27
Umm-Salal	2009–10	Stars League	20	11	0	0	7	9	0	0	27	20
Umm-Salal	2011–12	Stars League	9	5	1	1	0	0	0	0	10	6
Umm-Salal	Total		56	41	2	1	7	9	10	2	75	53
Ceará	2010	Série A	21	9							21	9
Atlético Mineiro	2011	Série A			4	1			2	0	6	1
Career total			335	195	15	9	25	12	22	12	397	228

=== International ===
Appearances and goals by national team and year
National team	Year	Apps	Goals
Brazil	2001	3	0
Total		3	0

== Honours ==
=== Club ===
- Rio de Janeiro State: 2002
- Brazilian Serie C: 1999
- Japanese Super Cup: 2007
- Ceará State: 2013, 2014
- Copa do Nordeste: 2015

=== Individual ===
- Brazilian League Top Scorer: 2000
- J.League All-Star Soccer MVP: 2005
- AFC Champions League top scorer: 2006
- J.League Top Scorer: 2006
- J.League Best Eleven: 2006
- Qatari League top scorer: 2008–09

== Notes ==
Preceded by Araújo	Qatari League Top Scorer; 2008–09	Succeeded by Younis Mahmoud
