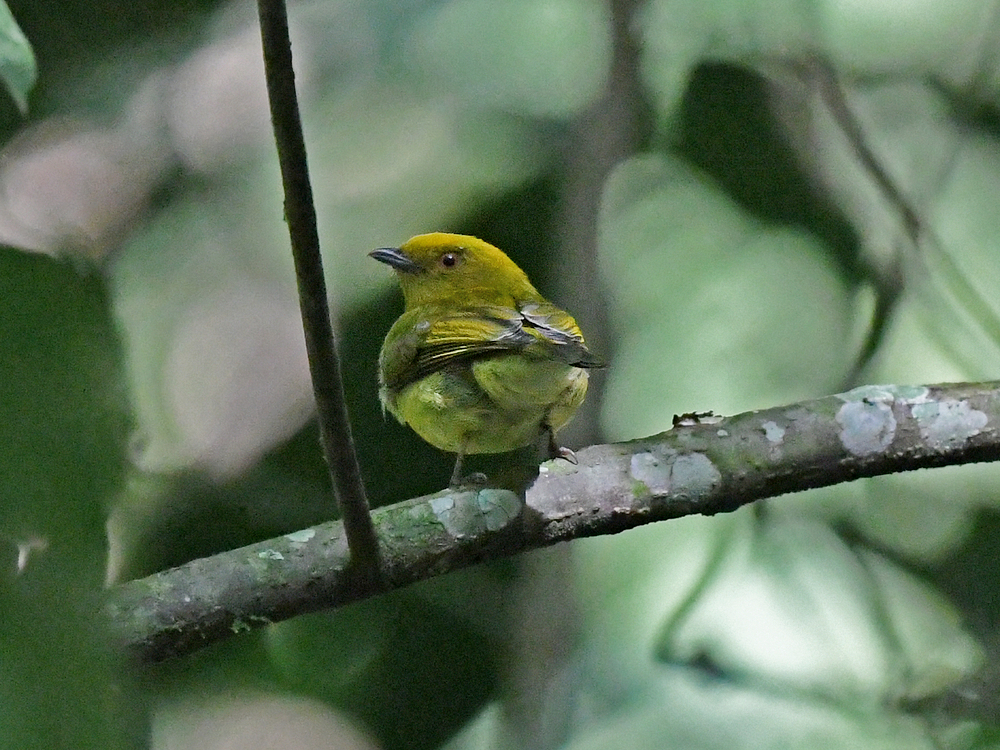
- in Antioquia, Colombia

Conservation status
- Vulnerable (IUCN 3.1)

Scientific classification
- Kingdom: Animalia
- Phylum: Chordata
- Class: Aves
- Order: Passeriformes
- Family: Pipridae
- Genus: Chloropipo
- Species: C. flavicapilla

Binomial name
- Chloropipo flavicapilla (Sclater, PL, 1852)

Synonyms
- see text

= Yellow-headed manakin =

Species of bird

The yellow-headed manakin (Chloropipo flavicapilla) is a Vulnerable species of bird in the family Pipridae. It is found in Colombia and Ecuador.

== Taxonomy and systematics ==
The yellow-headed manakin was originally described as Pipra flavicapilla. During much of the twentieth century it was placed in genus Xenopipo. However, a study published in 2013 showed that Xenopipo was polyphyletic and proposed resurrecting genus Chloropipo for the yellow-headed and jet manakins. Taxonomic systems soon adopted the reassignments.

The yellow-headed manakin is monotypic.

== Description ==
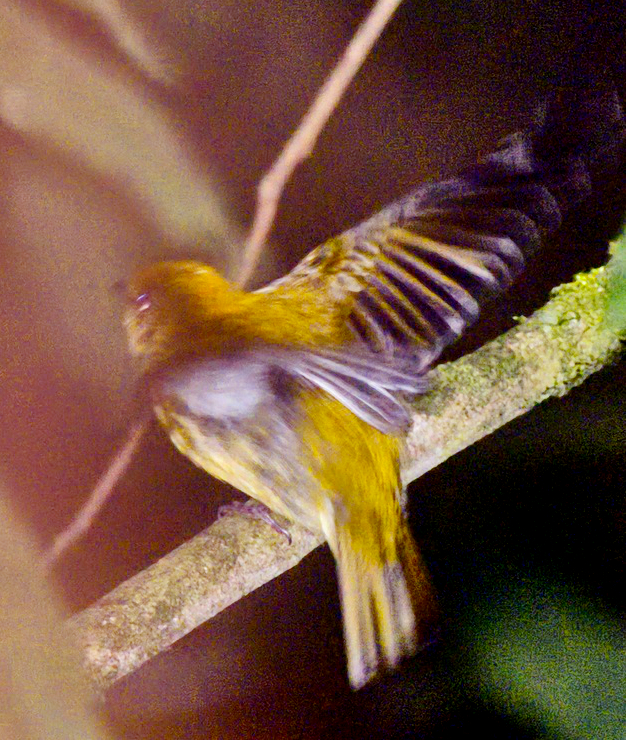
Yellow-headed manakin

The yellow-headed manakin is 12 to 13 cm (4.7 to 5.1 in) long and weighs 15.3 to 19.5 g (0.54 to 0.69 oz). The sexes have similar plumage. Adult males have a golden-yellow crown and nape; the rest of their upperparts are bright olive. Their face, throat, and breast are a paler and yellower olive and their belly pale yellow. Adult females have a duller and less yellow head and breast than males. Both sexes have a pale orange to red iris, a blackish maxilla, a bluish gray mandible, and gray legs and feet. Juveniles are similar to adult females but are duller overall.

== Distribution and habitat ==
The yellow-headed manakin is found intermittently in Colombia along the Western and the west slope of the Central Andes. In the west it is found in Valle del Cauca and Cauca departments. In the central range it is found from southern Antioquia Department south to Huila Department. According to some sources, its range includes north-central Ecuador on the eastern slope of the Andes in at least Napo and Tungurahua provinces. However, the independent South American Classification Committee has no records from that country.

The yellow-headed manakin inhabits humid montane forest and secondary woodlands in the subtropical zone. In elevation it ranges between 1,200 and 2,400 m (3,900 and 7,900 ft) in Colombia and between 1,500 and 2,400 m (4,900 and 7,900 ft) in Ecuador.

== Behavior ==
=== Movement ===
The yellow-headed manakin is believed to be a year-round resident.

=== Feeding ===
The yellow-headed manakin feeds mostly on fruits; those of Palicourea are thought to be included. It sometimes joins mixed-species feeding flocks.

=== Breeding ===
The yellow-headed manakin does not appear to have a defined breeding season, as active nests or birds in breeding condition have been recorded in January, March, May, and July. The one known nest was an open cup made from strips of grass lined with sticks and bound together and to a branch fork with spider web. It held one egg that was later predated. Nothing else is known about the species' breeding range.

=== Vocalization ===
The vocalizations have been recorded but not described.

== Status ==
The IUCN originally in 1988 assessed the yellow-headed manakin as being of Least Concern. In 2004 it was reassessed as Near Threatened and since 2015 as Vulnerable. It has a small and disjunct range. Its estimated population of between 3500 and 4000 mature individuals is believed to be decreasing. "The major threat to this species is the loss and fragmentation of its habitat. Much of its range is within prime agricultural land." It is considered "uncommon and local" in Colombia and "barely known" in Ecuador. It does occur in at least eight protected areas.
