= Piña Airport =

- IATA: BFQ; ICAO: MPPI

Summary
- Airport type: Public
- Serves: Puerto Piña, Panama
- Elevation AMSL: 14 ft / 4 m
- Coordinates: 7°35′15″N 78°10′50″W

Map
- Location of the airport in Panama

Runways
Direction	Length		Surface
Direction	m	ft	Surface
02/20	700	2,297	Asphalt
- Source: Google Maps HERE Maps GCM

Piña Airport (IATA: BFQ) is an airport serving Puerto Piña, a Pacific coastal village in the Darién Province of Panama.

The runway starts at the shore next to the village, and runs inland into the forest. There is mountainous terrain to the north, and rising terrain both east and west. South approach and departure are over the water.

The La Palma VOR (Ident: PML) is located 49.6 nautical miles (92 km) north of the airport.

== See also ==
- Transport in Panama
- List of airports in Panama
