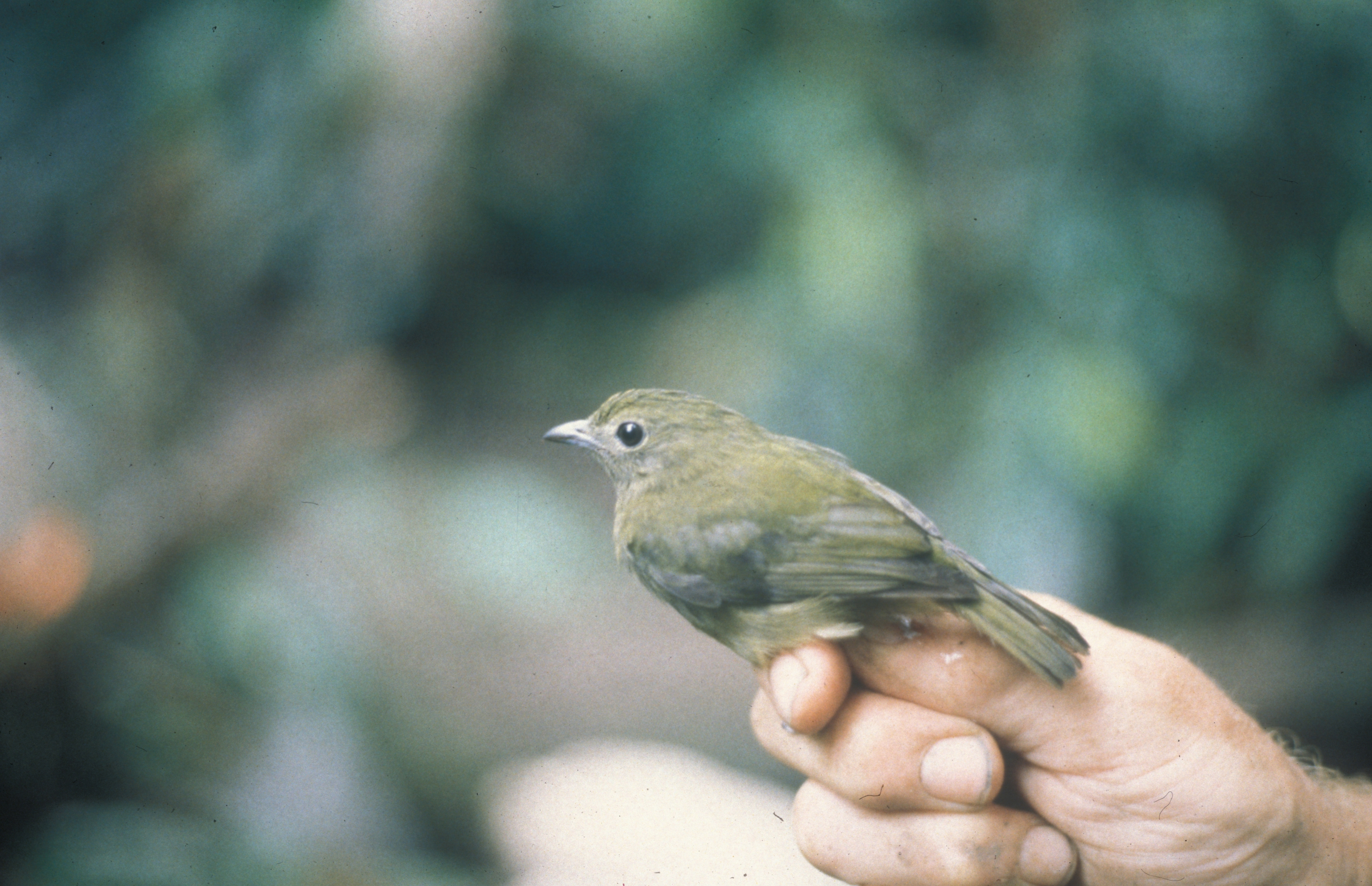
- Green manakin

Scientific classification
- Domain: Eukaryota
- Kingdom: Animalia
- Phylum: Chordata
- Class: Aves
- Order: Passeriformes
- Family: Pipridae
- Genus: Cryptopipo; Ohlson et al., 2013

Synonyms
- Xenopipo

= Cryptopipo =

Genus of birds

Cryptopipo is a genus of passerine birds in the family Pipridae.

It contains the following species:

- Green manakin (Cryptopipo holochlora)
- Choco manakin (Cryptopipo litae)
