= Camogantí =

Coordinates: 8.1333°N 77.8833°W

- Corregimiento
- Location within Panama
- Country: Panama
- Province: Darién
- District: Chepigana

Area
  - Land: 461 km^{2} (178 sq mi)

Population (2010)
  - Total: 282
  - Density: 0.6/km^{2} (1.6/sq mi)
- Population density calculated based on land area.
- Time zone: UTC−5 (EST)
- Climate: Am

Camogantí is a corregimiento in Chepigana District, Darién Province, Panama with a population of 282 as of 2010. Its population as of 1990 was 205; its population as of 2000 was 329.
