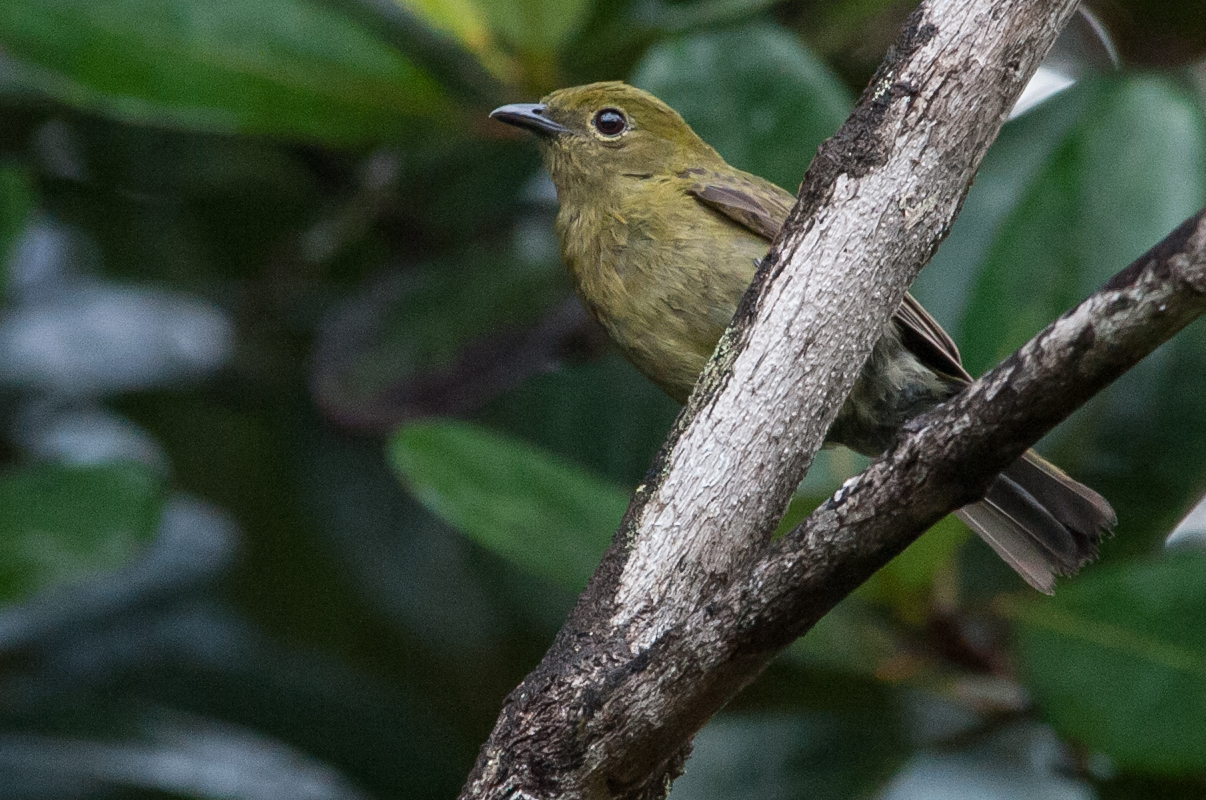

Conservation status
- Least Concern (IUCN 3.1)

Scientific classification
- Kingdom: Animalia
- Phylum: Chordata
- Class: Aves
- Order: Passeriformes
- Family: Pipridae
- Genus: Xenopipo
- Species: X. uniformis

Binomial name
- Xenopipo uniformis (Salvin & Godman, 1884)

Synonyms
- Chloropipo uniformis

= Olive manakin =

Species of bird

The olive manakin (Xenopipo uniformis) is a species of bird in the family Pipridae. It is found in Brazil, Guyana, and Venezuela.

== Taxonomy and systematics ==
The olive manakin was originally described as Chloropipo uniformis. It was later assigned to genus Xenopipo that Jean Cabanis had erected in 1847. It shares that genus with the black manakin (X. atronitens).

The olive manakin has two subspecies, the nominate X. u. uniformis (Salvin & Godman, 1884) and X. u. duidae (Chapman, 1929).

== Description ==
The olive manakin is 13 to 13.5 cm (5.1 to 5.3 in) long and weighs 16.5 to 21 g (0.58 to 0.74 oz). Unusual for a manakin, the sexes have the same plumage. The species also has longer wings and tail relative to its size than many other manakins. Adults of the nominate subspecies have dark olive upperparts. Their throat and underparts are a slightly paler olive and their belly has a yellowish cast. Subspecies X. u. duidae is slightly smaller and brighter than the nominate. Both subspecies have a dark iris, bill, and legs and feet.

== Distribution and habitat ==
The olive manakin has a highly disjunct distribution. The nominate subspecies has the largest contiguous range. It encompasses east-central Bolívar in eastern Venezuela and continues slightly into extreme northern Brazil's Roraima and somewhat further into west-central Guyana. The nominate is also found on tepuis in southern Bolívar. Subspecies X. u. duidae is found in Venezuela on Cerro Duida and Cerro Sipapo, tepuis in Amazonas. There are also a very few scattered records further south and east in Brazil, at least two of which are very distant from the species' core range.

The olive manakin inhabits humid and wet mossy forest and stunted woodland, especially areas heavy with Melastomataceae. In elevation it ranges between 800 and 2,100 m (2,600 and 6,900 ft) in Venezuela and up to 1,200 m (3,900 ft) in Brazil.

== Behavior ==
=== Movement ===
The olive manakin is primarily a year-round resident though it is thought to possibly make sonme elevational movements.

=== Feeding ===
The olive manakin is known to feed on small fruits and probably also includes insects in its diet. Its foraging behavior has not been studied.

=== Breeding ===
Nothing is known about the olive manakin's breeding biology.

=== Vocalization ===
The olive manakin's "advertising call" is "a clear, rising whistle, preeeeeeeeEE, penetrating but not loud". It is sometimes preceded by "a few low, stuttery stu-tu-tu-tu-tu notes given quickly, or a short chip note".

== Status ==
The IUCN has assessed the olive manakin as being of Least Concern. Its population size is not known and is believed to be decreasing. No immediate threats have been identified. It is considered fairly common in Venezuela and rare in Brazil. It is found in Venezuela's Canaima National Park.
