= Garachiné =

- Corregimiento
- Location within Panama
- Coordinates: 08°3′36″N 078°21′36″W
- Country: Panama
- Province: Darién
- District: Chepigana

Area
  - Land: 188.5 km^{2} (72.8 sq mi)

Population (2010)
  - Total: 1,878
  - Density: 10/km^{2} (26/sq mi)
- Population density calculated based on land area.
- Time zone: UTC−5 (EST)

Garachiné is a corregimiento in Chepigana District, Darién Province, Panama with a population of 1,878 as of 2010. Its population as of 1990 was 1,800; its population as of 2000 was 1,944.

== Transportation ==
The village is served by the Garachiné Airport (IATA: GHE).

== Climate ==
Climate data for Garachiné 2001–2015
Month	Jan	Feb	Mar	Apr	May	Jun	Jul	Aug	Sep	Oct	Nov	Dec	Year
Mean daily maximum °C (°F)	31.2 (88.2)	31.6 (88.9)	32.1 (89.8)	32.4 (90.3)	31.3 (88.3)	30.9 (87.6)	30.9 (87.6)	30.9 (87.6)	30.8 (87.4)	30.3 (86.5)	30.2 (86.4)	30.2 (86.4)	31.1 (87.9)
Daily mean °C (°F)	27.4 (81.3)	27.6 (81.7)	28.1 (82.6)	28.5 (83.3)	27.7 (81.9)	27.3 (81.1)	27.3 (81.1)	27.2 (81.0)	27.1 (80.8)	26.7 (80.1)	26.7 (80.1)	26.9 (80.4)	27.4 (81.3)
Mean daily minimum °C (°F)	23.5 (74.3)	23.6 (74.5)	24.1 (75.4)	24.6 (76.3)	24.1 (75.4)	23.7 (74.7)	23.7 (74.7)	23.6 (74.5)	23.4 (74.1)	23.1 (73.6)	23.1 (73.6)	23.4 (74.1)	23.7 (74.6)
Average rainfall mm (inches)	14.6 (0.57)	6.3 (0.25)	10.4 (0.41)	56.4 (2.22)	142.5 (5.61)	140.8 (5.54)	141.8 (5.58)	131.0 (5.16)	138.8 (5.46)	223.6 (8.80)	209.1 (8.23)	89.7 (3.53)	1,305 (51.36)
Source 1: INEC
Source 2: IMHPA

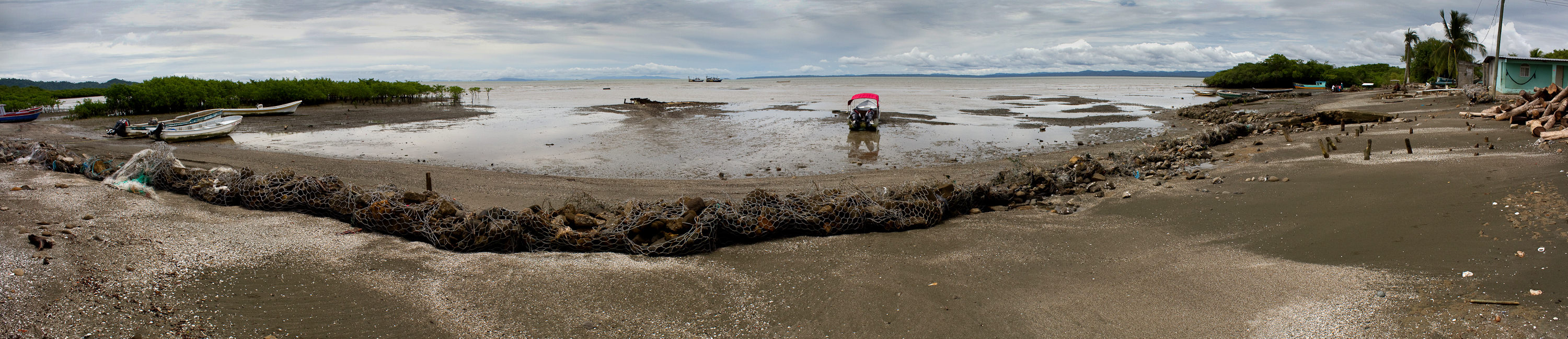
Panorama of beach at Garachiné, looking northwards
