= Chepigana =

Coordinates: 8.2842°N 78.0414°W

- Corregimiento
- Location within Panama
- Country: Panama
- Province: Darién
- District: Chepigana

Area
  - Land: 381.9 km^{2} (147.5 sq mi)

Population (2010)
  - Total: 704
  - Density: 1.8/km^{2} (4.7/sq mi)
- Population density calculated based on land area.
- Time zone: UTC−5 (EST)

Chepigana is a corregimiento in Chepigana District, Darién Province, Panama with a population of 704 as of 2010. Its population as of 1990 was 742; its population as of 2000 was 582.

== Notable residents ==
- Alfonso Lopez, WBA world Flyweight boxing champion
