= Santa Fe, Darién =

Santa Fe
- Corregimiento and town
- Location within Panama
- Coordinates: 8°39′23″N 78°8′54″W
- Country: Panama
- Province: Darién
- District: Chepigana
- Established: July 29, 1998

Area
  - Land: 615.3 km^{2} (237.6 sq mi)

Population (2010)
  - Total: 6,923
  - Density: 11.3/km^{2} (29/sq mi)
- Population density calculated based on land area.
- Time zone: UTC−5 (EST)
- Climate: Am

Santa Fe is a corregimiento and town in Chepigana District, Darién Province, Panama with a population of 6,923 as of 2010. It was created by Law 58 of July 29, 1998, owing to the Declaration of Unconstitutionality of Law 1 of 1982. Its population as of 2000 was 5,764. It is approximately 200 km east of Panama City on the Inter-American Highway. The town contains a hospital. It is served by bus.
