= Río Congo Arriba =

- Corregimiento
- Country: Panama
- Province: Darién
- District: Chepigana
- Established: July 29, 1998

Area
  - Land: 329.5 km^{2} (127.2 sq mi)

Population (2010)
  - Total: 1,916
  - Density: 5.8/km^{2} (15/sq mi)
- Population density calculated based on land area.
- Time zone: UTC−5 (EST)

Río Congo Arriba is a corregimiento in Chepigana District, Darién Province, Panama with a population of 1,916 as of 2010. It was created by Law 58 of July 29, 1998, owing to the Declaration of Unconstitutionality of Law 1 of 1982. Its population as of 2000 was 1,752.

== Populated places ==
Platanilla is the main village and corregimiento seat within Río Congo Arriba; which hosts a school, health center, community center, police station, and corregiduria. Other settlements in the corregimiento also include Río Venado, Nuevo Paraíso, Río Pavo, Buena Vista, Río Bonito, and the indigenous Embera communities Tres Piedras and Monte Rico.
