= BR-110 (Brazil highway) =

Highway in Brazil

BR-110

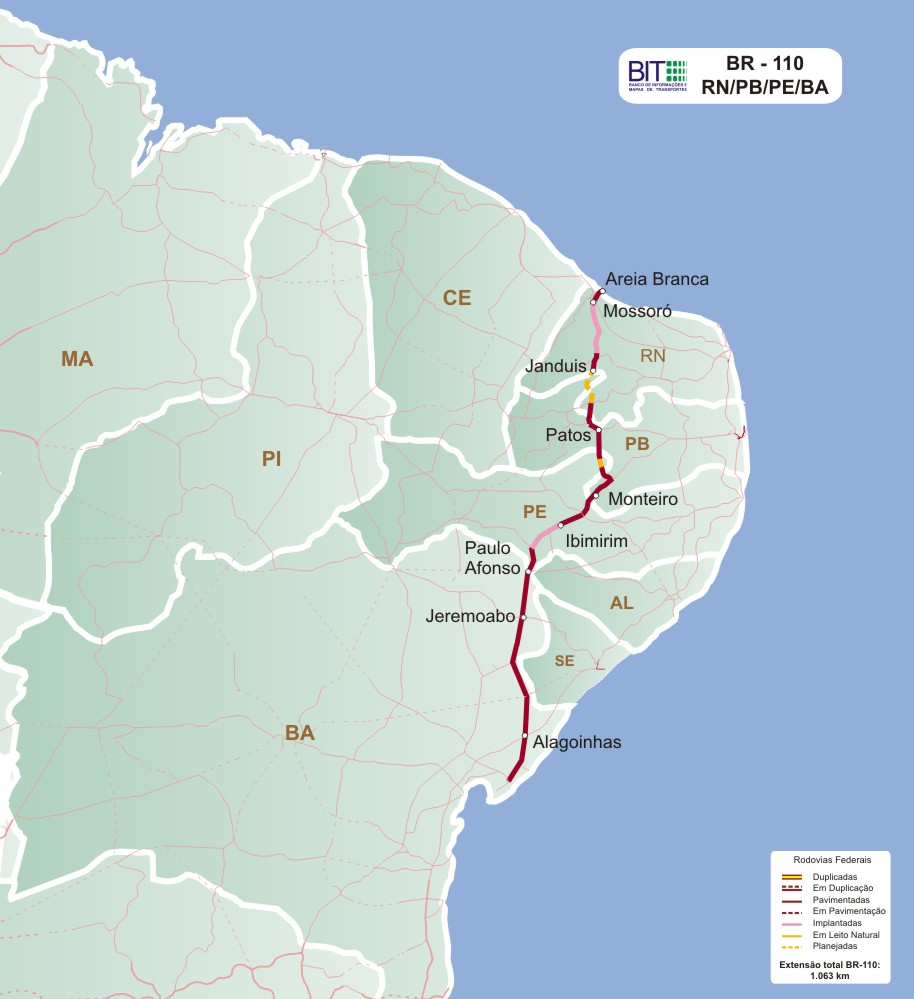

Route information
- Length: 1,091.1 km (678.0 mi)

Major junctions
- North end: Areia Branca, Rio Grande do Norte
- South end: Catu, Bahia

Location
- Country: Brazil

Highway system
- Highways in Brazil; Federal

BR-110 is a federal highway of Brazil. The 1,091-kilometre road connects Areia Branca to Catu.

The highway passes through the driest area and one of the poorest in the country. In Mossoró, however, there is the largest production of melon in the country, focused on exports. On the coast of Ceará and Rio Grande do Norte, almost all of Brazil's cashew production also occurs there. In Paulo Afonso, Bahia, there is an important hydroelectric power plant. The production of shrimp in Brazil was 41.0 thousand tons in 2017. Rio Grande do Norte (37.7%) and Ceará (28.9%) were the largest producers. Aracati, in Ceará, next to the BR-110, was the city with the largest share.
