= Jaqué River =

River in Panama

Location
- Country: Panama

Physical characteristics
- Source
  - location: Darién National Park
- Mouth
  - location: Jaqué, Darién Province
  - coordinates: 7°30′00″N 78°03′00″W

The Jaqué River is a river in the Darién Province of southern Panama. It flows generally westward from its source in the Darién National Park to the town of Jaqué, where it enters the Pacific Ocean.

== See also ==
- List of rivers of Panama
