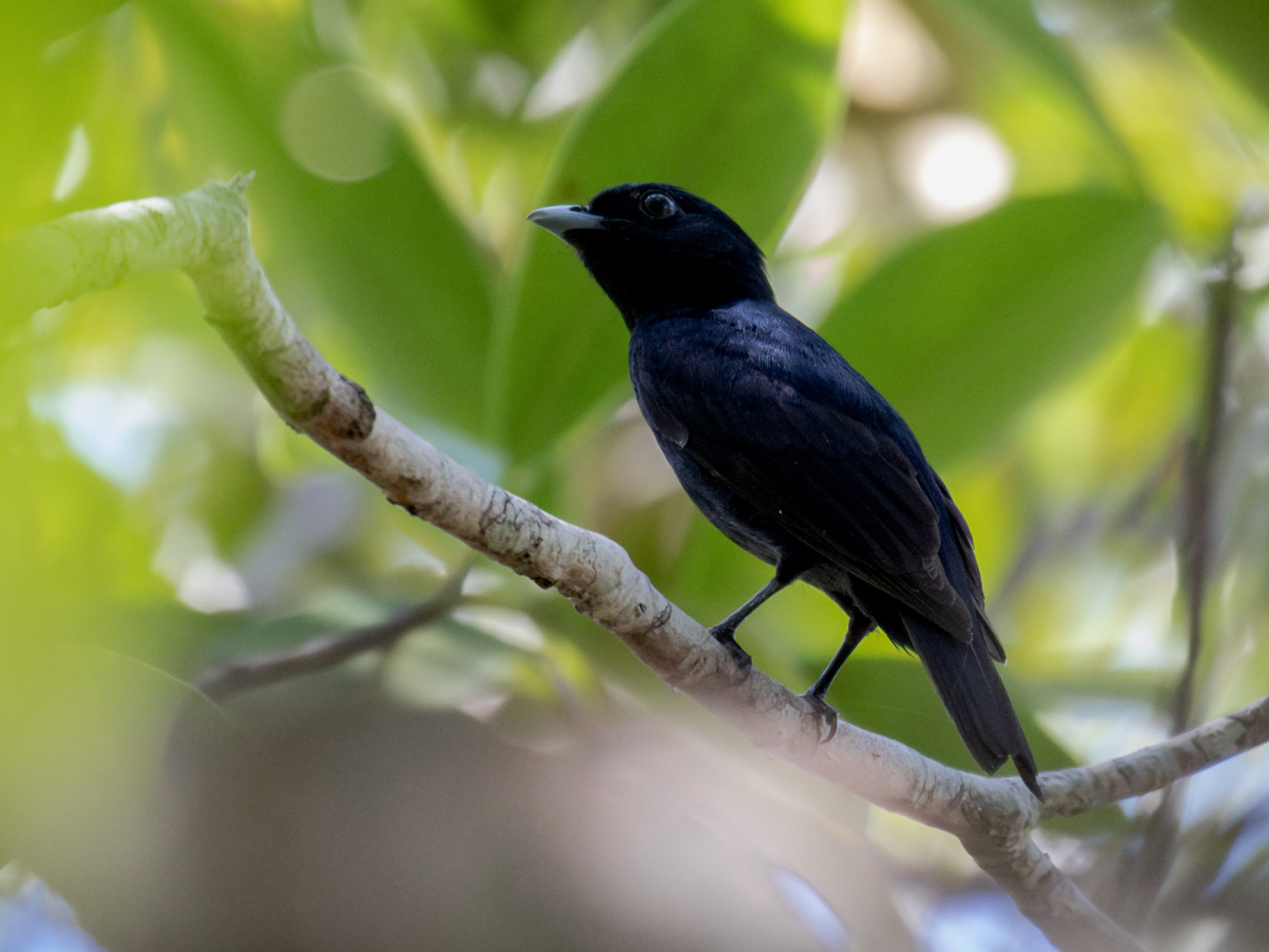

Conservation status
- Least Concern (IUCN 3.1)

Scientific classification
- Kingdom: Animalia
- Phylum: Chordata
- Class: Aves
- Order: Passeriformes
- Family: Pipridae
- Genus: Xenopipo
- Species: X. atronitens

Binomial name
- Xenopipo atronitens Cabanis, 1847

= Black manakin =

Species of bird

The black manakin (Xenopipo atronitens) is a species of bird in the family Pipridae. It is found in Bolivia, Brazil, Colombia, French Guiana, Guyana, Peru, Suriname, and Venezuela.

== Taxonomy and systematics ==
Jean Cabanis erected genus Xenopipo in 1847 with the black manakin as its type species. It shares the genus with the olive manakin (X. uniformis). The black manakin is monotypic.

== Description ==
The black manakin is 12 to 13 cm (4.7 to 5.1 in) long and weighs 12.5 to 18 g (0.44 to 0.63 oz). The species is sexually dimorphic. Adult males are almost entirely glossy black; their wings and tail are slightly duller and browner. Adult females have dark olive upperparts, a grayish throat, and yellowish olive underparts. Both sexes have a dark brown iris and dark olive-gray legs and feet. Both sexes have a heavy bill; males' are pale bluish gray and females' have a blackish maxilla and a pale bluish gray mandible.

== Distribution and habitat ==
The black manakin has a highly disjunct distribution. One large range extends from Meta Department in central Colombia widening to the east across northern Amazonas and Roraima in northern Brazil, Amazonas and southern and central Bolívar in Venezuela, most of Guyana, northern French Guiana and Suriname, and back into northern Brazil in Amapá. Another large range is in central Amazonian Brazil in a triangle roughly bounded by east-central Amazonas, central Goiás, and eastern Tocantins. There are also small scattered Brazilian populations in southern Amazonas, Acre, and Rondônia. It also occurs very thinly in Brazil between the two large ranges. There are additional small populations in Peru's Loreto, Ucayali, and southern Madre de Dios and Bolivia's Beni and Santa Cruz.

The black manakin inhabits a variety of somewhat open landscapes including savanna woodlands and thickets, gallery forest, and stunted várzea. Much of its habitat is on nutrient-poor sandy soils. In elevation it is found below 500 m (1,600 ft) in Colombia and mostly below 700 m (2,300 ft) but up to 1,200 m (3,900 ft) in Venezuela.

== Behavior ==
=== Movement ===
The black manakin is a year-round resident.

=== Feeding ===
The black manakin feeds on fruits and insects that it grabs from foliage and branches with short sallies from a perch. It typically feeds singly though two or three may feed in the same tree, and it regularly joins mixed species feeding flocks.

=== Breeding ===
Males display at leks to females, but the display is "unspectacular, no more than calling and chasing". Nothing else is known about the species' breeding biology.

=== Vocalization ===
The black manakin has a variety of loud, sharp calls including "skee! kip-kip-kip-krrr, with many variations, and a dry, rattling trrrrrrrrrup" and a "very high, chirping writ wit wit" that varies in pitch.

== Status ==
The IUCN has assessed the black manakin as being of Least Concern. It has a very large range; its population size is not known and is believed to be decreasing. No immediate threats have been identified. It is considered fairly common in Colombia and Venezuela and locally fairly common in Peru. It is fairly common in the two large Brazilian ranges and rare to uncommon between them and to their west. Even in its large nominally contiguous ranges it is patchily distributed.
