= Setegantí =

Coordinates: 8.2317°N 78.0775°W

- Corregimiento
- Location within Panama
- Country: Panama
- Province: Darién
- District: Chepigana

Area
  - Land: 101.1 km^{2} (39.0 sq mi)

Population (2010)
  - Total: 558
  - Density: 5.5/km^{2} (14/sq mi)
- Population density calculated based on land area.
- Time zone: UTC−5 (EST)

Setegantí is a corregimiento in Chepigana District, Darién Province, Panama with a population of 558 as of 2010. Its population as of 1990 was 496; its population as of 2000 was 524.
