= Río Congo, Darién =

Coordinates: 8.4003°N 78.3698°W

Río Congo
- Corregimiento
- Location within Panama
- Country: Panama
- Province: Darién
- District: Chepigana

Area
  - Land: 474 km^{2} (183 sq mi)

Population (2010)
  - Total: 1,540
  - Density: 3.2/km^{2} (8.3/sq mi)
- Population density calculated based on land area.
- Time zone: UTC−5 (EST)

Río Congo is a corregimiento in Chepigana District, Darién Province, Panama with a population of 1,540 as of 2010. Its population as of 1990 was 2,454; its population as of 2000 was 1,549.
