= Taimatí =

Coordinates: 8.1530°N 78.2438°W

- Corregimiento
- Location within Panama
- Country: Panama
- Province: Darién
- District: Chepigana

Area
  - Land: 170 km^{2} (66 sq mi)

Population (2010)
  - Total: 764
  - Density: 4.5/km^{2} (12/sq mi)
- Population density calculated based on land area.
- Time zone: UTC−5 (EST)

Taimatí is a corregimiento in Chepigana District, Darién Province, Panama with a population of 764 as of 2010. Its population as of 1990 was 625; its population as of 2000 was 681.
