= Areia Branca, Rio Grande do Norte =

Municipality in Rio Grande do Norte, Brazil

Coordinates: 4.95583°S 37.1369°W

- Municipality
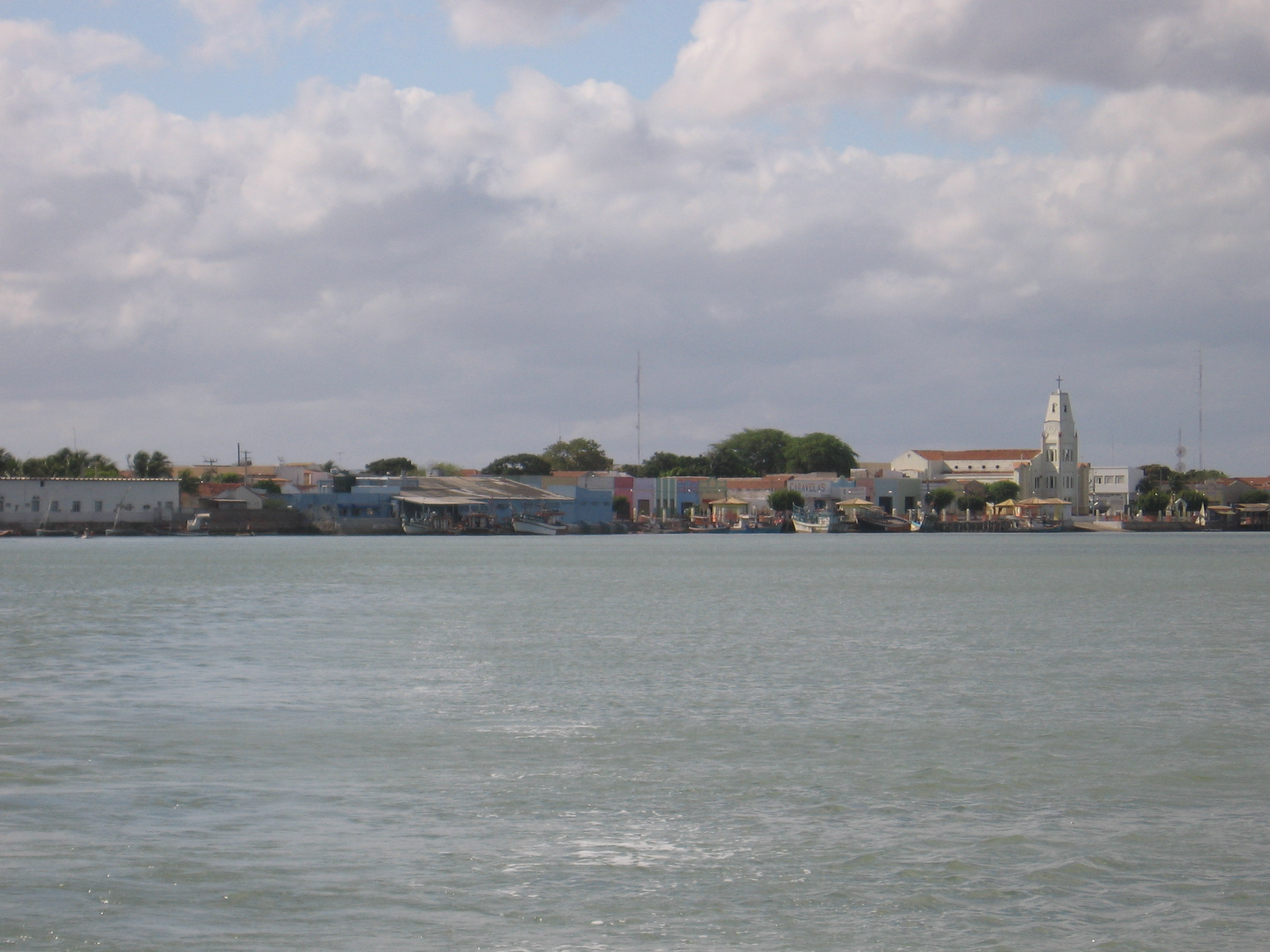
- Areia Branca skyline.

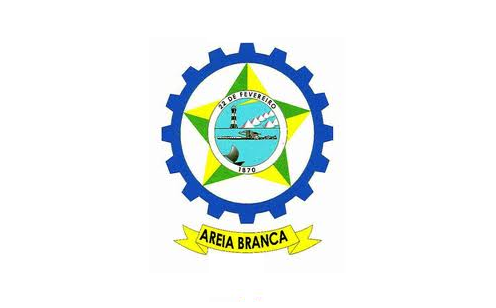
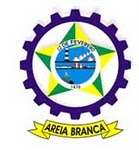
- Flag Coat of arms
- Interactive map of Areia Branca, Rio Grande do Norte
- Country: Brazil
- Region: Nordeste
- State: Rio Grande do Norte
- Mesoregion: Oeste Potiguar

Population (2022)
  - Total: 24,093
- Time zone: UTC−3 (BRT)

Areia Branca is a municipality in the state of Rio Grande do Norte in the Northeast region of Brazil. With an area of 342.749 square kilometers (132.336 sq mi), of which 6.5913 square kilometres (2.5449 sq mi) is urban, it is located 232 km from Natal, the state capital, and 1,689 km from Brasília, the federal capital. Its population in the 2022 demographic census was 24,093 inhabitants, according to the Brazilian Institute of Geography and Statistics (IBGE), ranking as the 23rd most populous municipality in the state of Rio Grande do Norte.

== Geography ==
The territory of Areia Branca covers 342.749 square kilometers (132.336 sq mi), of which 6.5913 square kilometres (2.5449 sq mi) constitutes the urban area. It sits at an average altitude of 3 meters above sea level. Areia Branca borders these municipalities: to the south, Serra do Mel and Porto do Mangue; to the east, Serra do Mel and Porto do Mangue again; and to the west, Grossos and Mossoró. The city is located 232 km from the state capital Natal, and 1,689 km from the federal capital Brasília.

Under the territorial division established in 2017 by the Brazilian Institute of Geography and Statistics (IBGE), the municipality belongs to the immediate geographical region of Mossoró, within the intermediate region of Mossoró. Previously, under the microregion and mesoregion divisions, it was part of the microregion of Mossoró in the mesoregion of Oeste Potiguar.

== Demographics ==
In the 2022 census, the municipality had a population of 24,093 inhabitants and ranked 23rd in the state that year (out of 167 municipalities), with 51.62% female and 48.38% male, resulting in a sex ratio of 93.74 (9,374 men for every 10,000 women), compared to 25,315 inhabitants in the 2010 census (80.26% living in the urban area), when it held the 19th state position. Between the 2010 and 2022 censuses, the population of Areia Branca changed at an annual geometric growth rate of -0.41%. Regarding age group in the 2022 census, 69.86% of the inhabitants were between 15 and 64 years old, 19.51% were under fifteen, and 10.64% were 65 or older. The population density in 2022 was 70.29 inhabitants per square kilometer, with an average of 2.94 inhabitants per household.

The municipality's Human Development Index (HDI-M) was considered medium, according to data from the United Nations Development Programme (UNDP). According to the 2010 report published in 2013, its value was 0.682, ranking seventh in the state and 2,386th nationally (out of 5,565 municipalities), and the Gini coefficient rose from 0.38 in 2003 to 0.48 in 2010. Considering only the longevity index, its value is 0.790, the income index is 0.647, and the education index is 0.621.

== See also ==
- List of municipalities in Rio Grande do Norte
