= Tucutí =

Coordinates: 7.9606°N 77.9329°W

- Corregimiento
- Location within Panama
- Country: Panama
- Province: Darién
- District: Chepigana

Area
  - Land: 1,396 km^{2} (539 sq mi)

Population (2010)
  - Total: 1,200
  - Density: 0.9/km^{2} (2.3/sq mi)
- Population density calculated based on land area.
- Time zone: UTC−5 (EST)
- Climate: Am

Tucutí is a corregimiento in Chepigana District, Darién Province, Panama with a population of 1,200 as of 2010. Its population as of 1990 was 1,455; its population as of 2000 was 1,263.
