= Aporá =

Municipality of Bahia, Brazil

- Municipality
- Município de Aporá; Municipality of Aporá
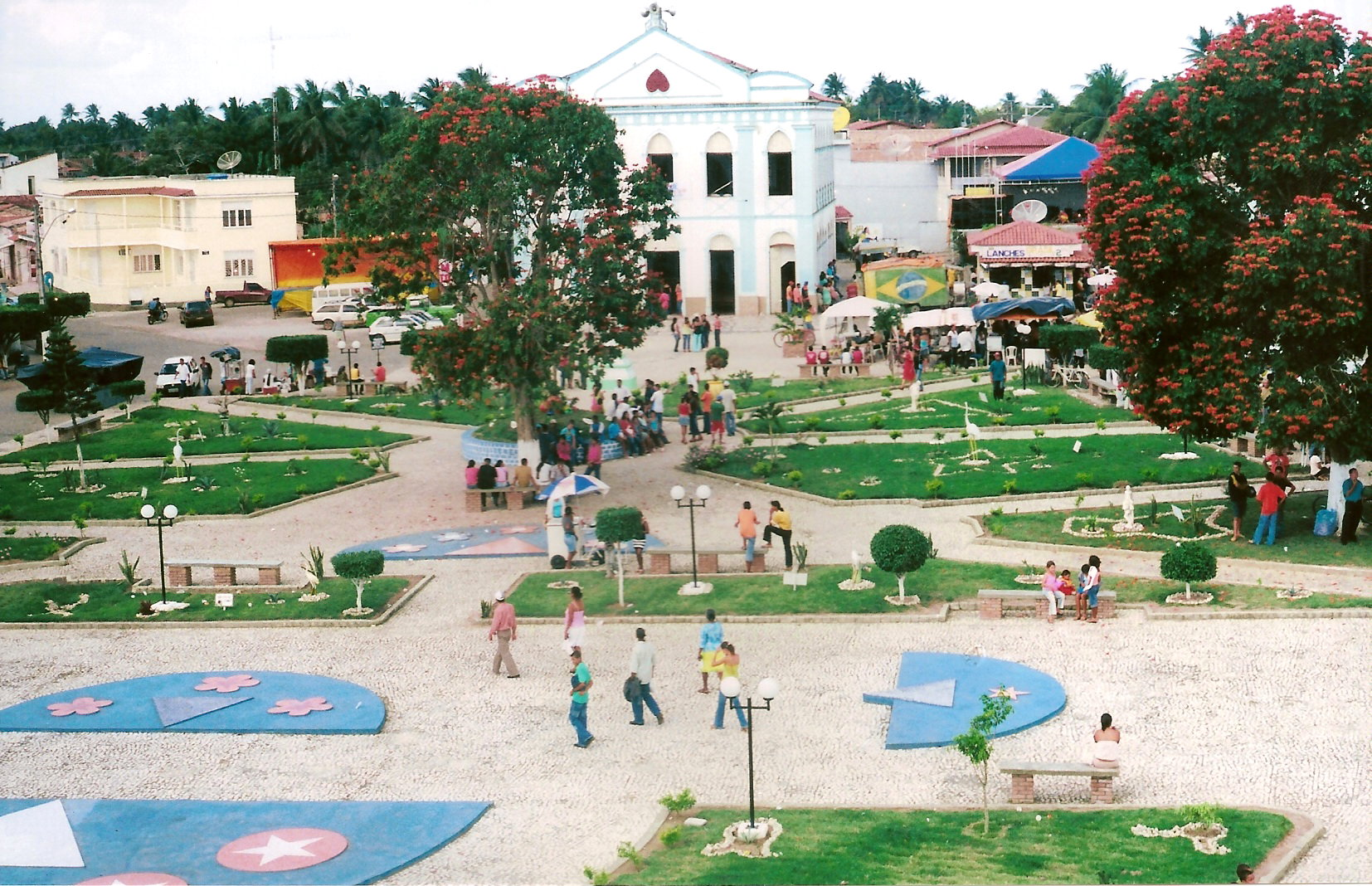
- The main square.

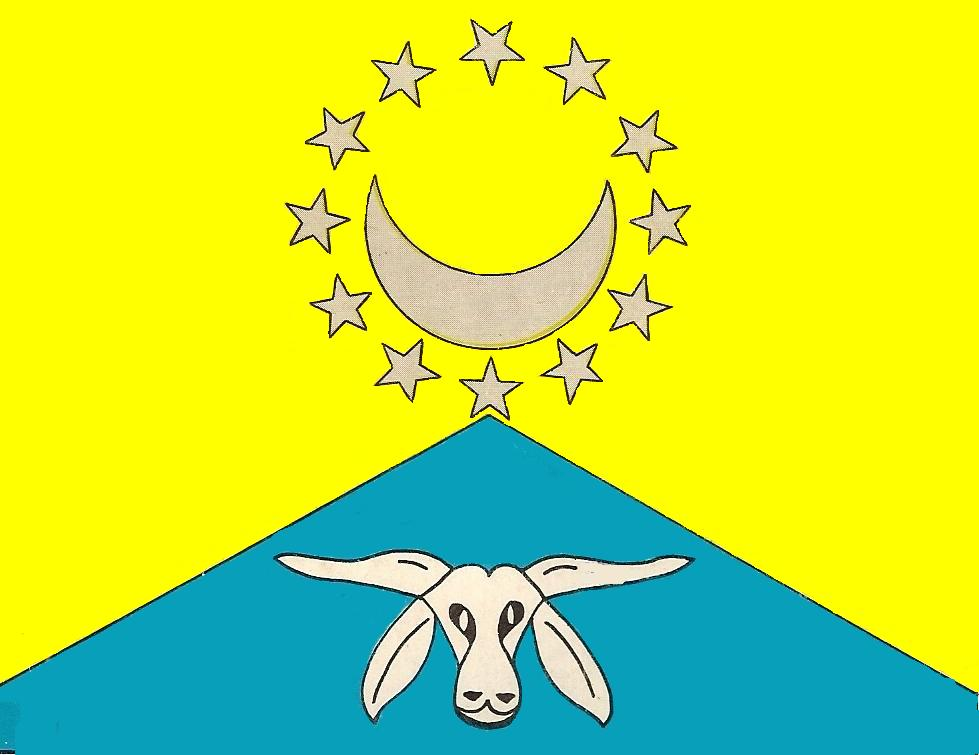
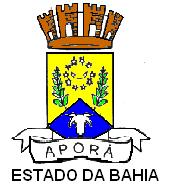
- Flag Coat of arms
- Nickname: A'Porã
- Location of Aporá in the State of Bahia

- Location in Brazil
- Coordinates: 11°39′36″S 38°04′51″W
- Country: Brazil
- Region: Northeast
- State: Bahia
- Founded: 14 August 1958
- Elevation: 186 m (610 ft)

Population (2020)
  - Total: 17,788
- Time zone: UTC−3 (BRT)
- Postal Code: 48350-000
- Area code: +55 75

Aporá is a municipality in the state of Bahia in the North-East region of Brazil.

The city population was 17 085 and its area is 572 km^{2} (29.36 inhabitants per km^{2}) according to the 2002 census. Aporá was emancipated from the municipality of Inhambupe on 14 August 1958 by municipal Resolution 89, and Aporá was created by Resolution 1021, signed on the same date.

To the north it is bordered by Crisópolis, to the south and west by Inhambupe, to the east by Esplanada, the northeast by Acajutiba, the northwest by Olindina and the southeast by Entre Rios.

== Folklore ==
Two books recounting histories, legends and stories about Aporá have been published. One was a work written by the pupils of the city's Golden College, titled "Basic Information on Aporá", and the other is called "Ao Lusco Fusco" (At Twilight), from author Selma Oliveira de Mendonça, in which she describes the origins of the name "Aporá" and presents traditional legends and customs of the city. A famous legend in the local folklore is the "Serpent of the Lagoon", the story of a newborn rejected by its mother, who throws it in a lagoon, and later summoned by a priest to come out of the waters, raising instead as a fire-breathing serpent that attacks the neglectful mother.
