= Cucunatí =

Coordinates: 8.5845°N 78.2509°W

- Corregimiento
- Location within Panama
- Country: Panama
- Province: Darién
- District: Chepigana
- Established: July 29, 1998

Area
  - Land: 196.6 km^{2} (75.9 sq mi)

Population (2010)
  - Total: 1,346
  - Density: 6.8/km^{2} (18/sq mi)
- Population density calculated based on land area.
- Time zone: UTC−5 (EST)

Cucunatí is a corregimiento in Chepigana District, Darién Province, Panama with a population of 1,346 as of 2010. It was created by Law 58 of July 29, 1998, owing to the Declaration of Unconstitutionality of Law 1 of 1982. Its population as of 2000 was 1,105.
