= La Palma, Darién =

La Palma
- Corregimiento and town
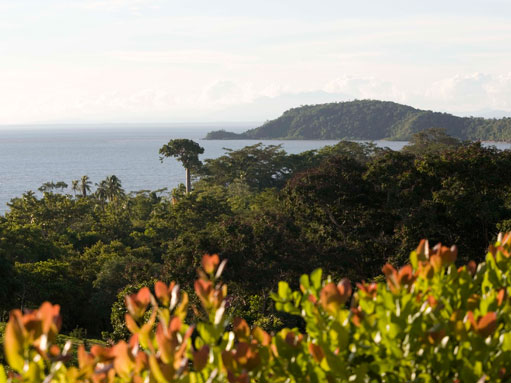
- Landscape in La Palma

- Location within Panama
- Coordinates: 8°24′36″N 78°9′0″W
- Country: Panama
- Province: Darién
- District: Chepigana

Area
  - Land: 526.6 km^{2} (203.3 sq mi)

Population (2010)
  - Total: 4,205
  - Density: 8/km^{2} (21/sq mi)
- Population density calculated based on land area.
- Time zone: UTC−5 (EST)
- Climate: Aw

La Palma (Spanish pronunciation: [la ˈpal.ma]) is a town and corregimiento in Chepigana District, Darién Province, Panama with a population of 4,205 as of 2010. It is the seat of Chepigana District. Its population as of 1990 was 11,632; its population as of 2000 was 3,884. It is located at the mouth of the Tuira river, where the wide river meets the Golfo de San Miguel. The Chucunaque River joins the Tuira further south.

== Economy ==
La Palma is the principal trading center for the large sparsely populated region that surrounds it. Plantains, corn, and rice are cultivated, and livestock is raised; there is also some sawmilling. The town is isolated, with no highway linking it to other communities in central and western Panama.

== Gallery ==
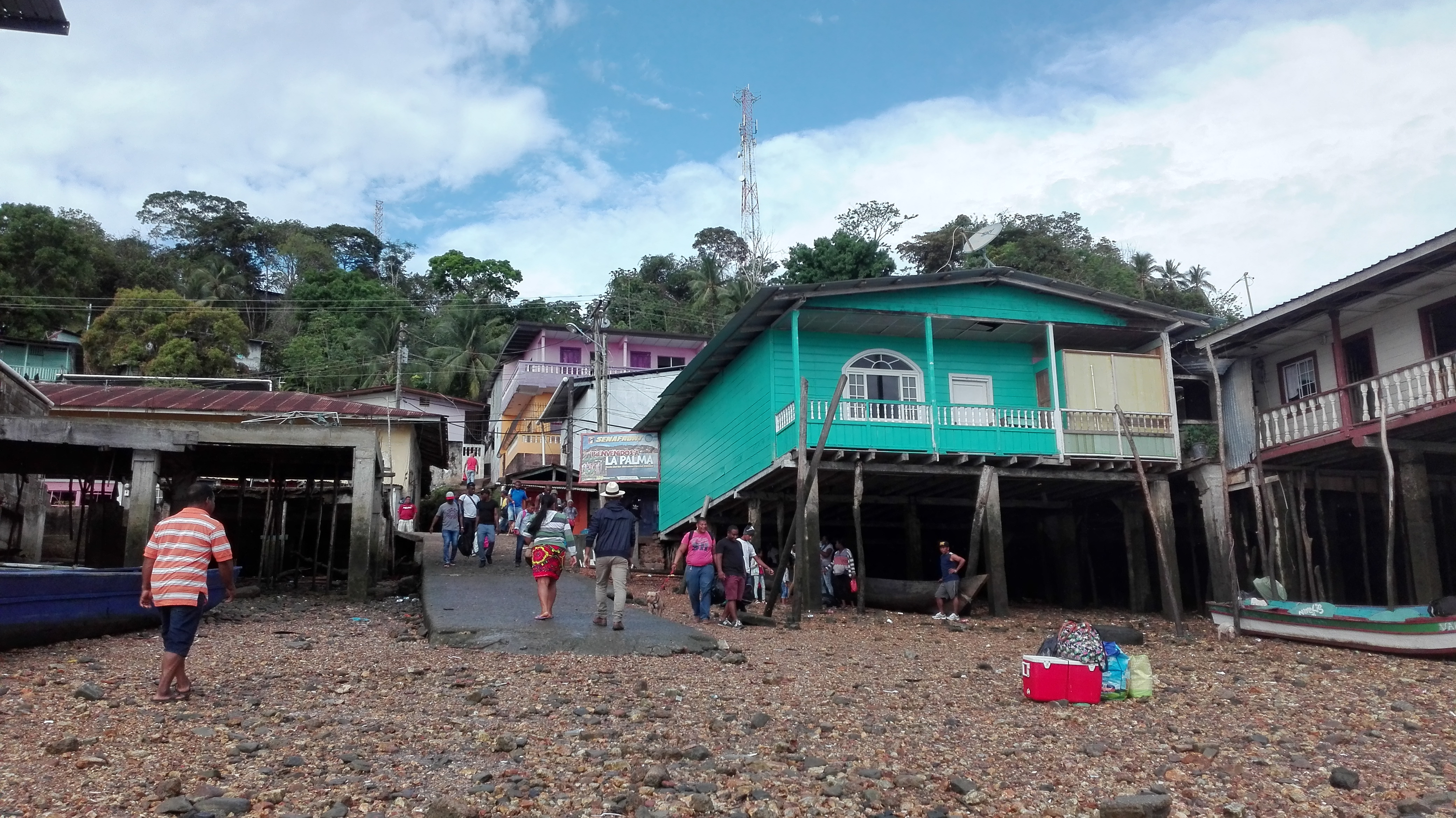
Housing

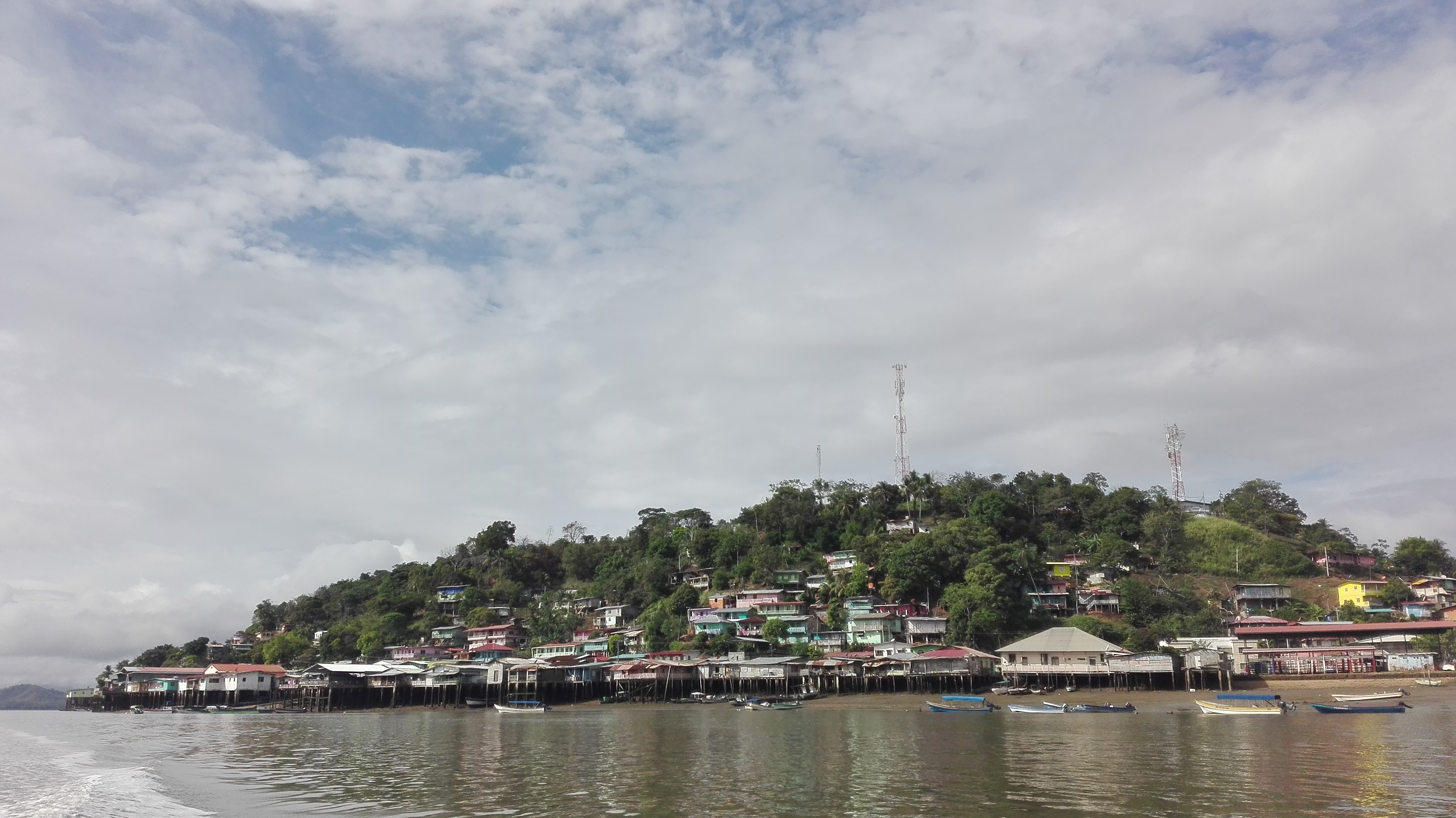
View of the town

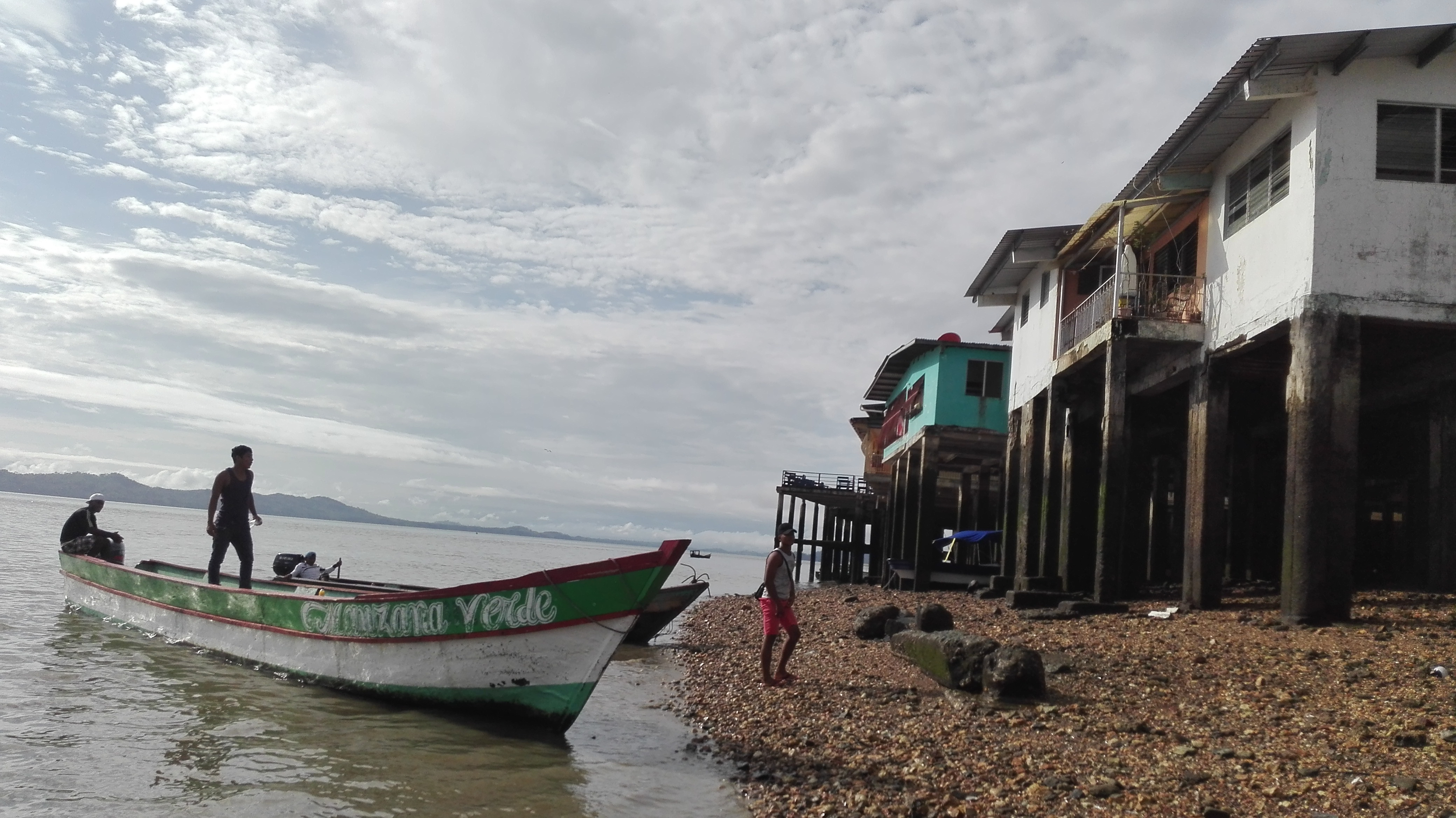
Canoe

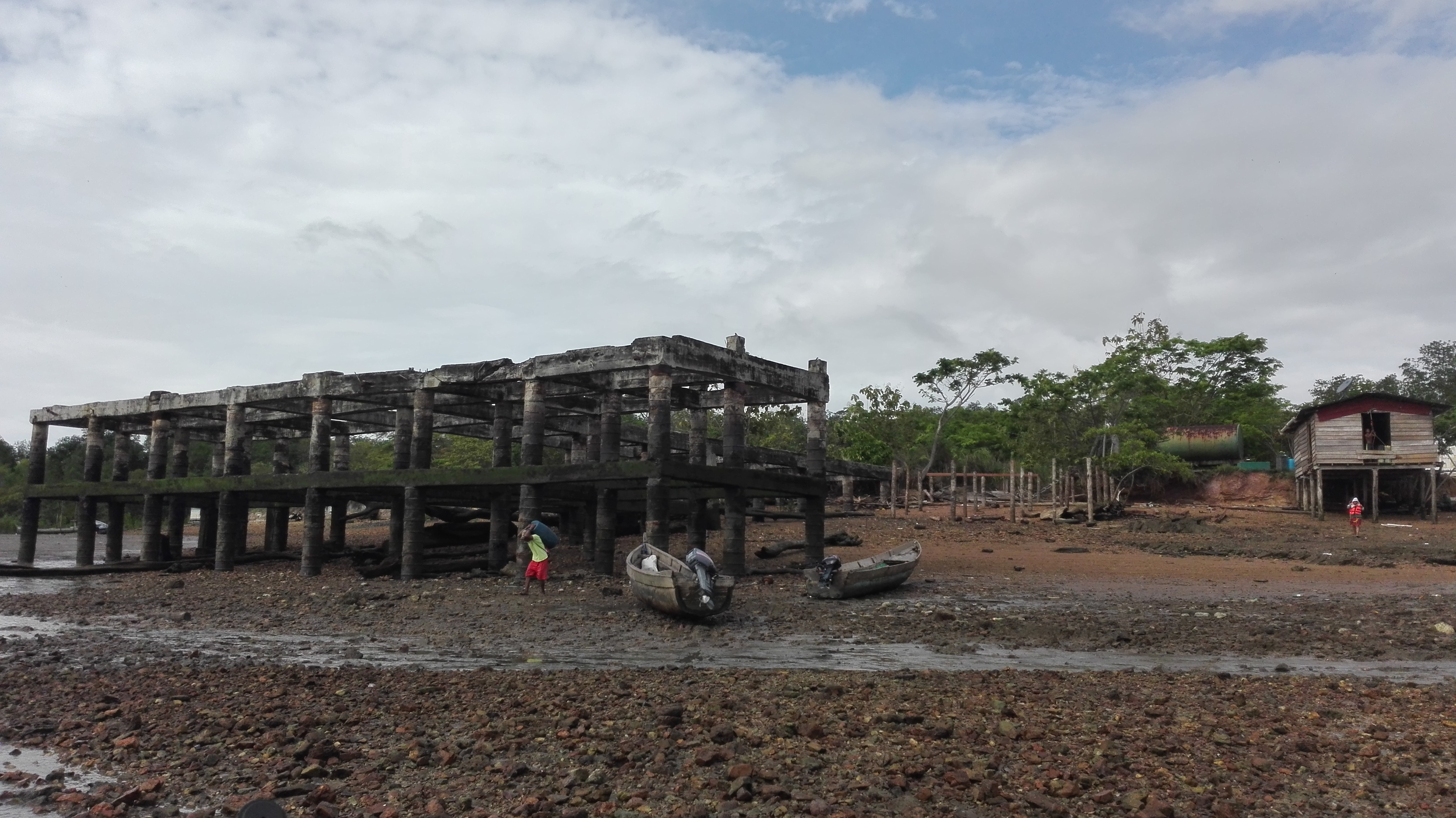
Concrete pier
