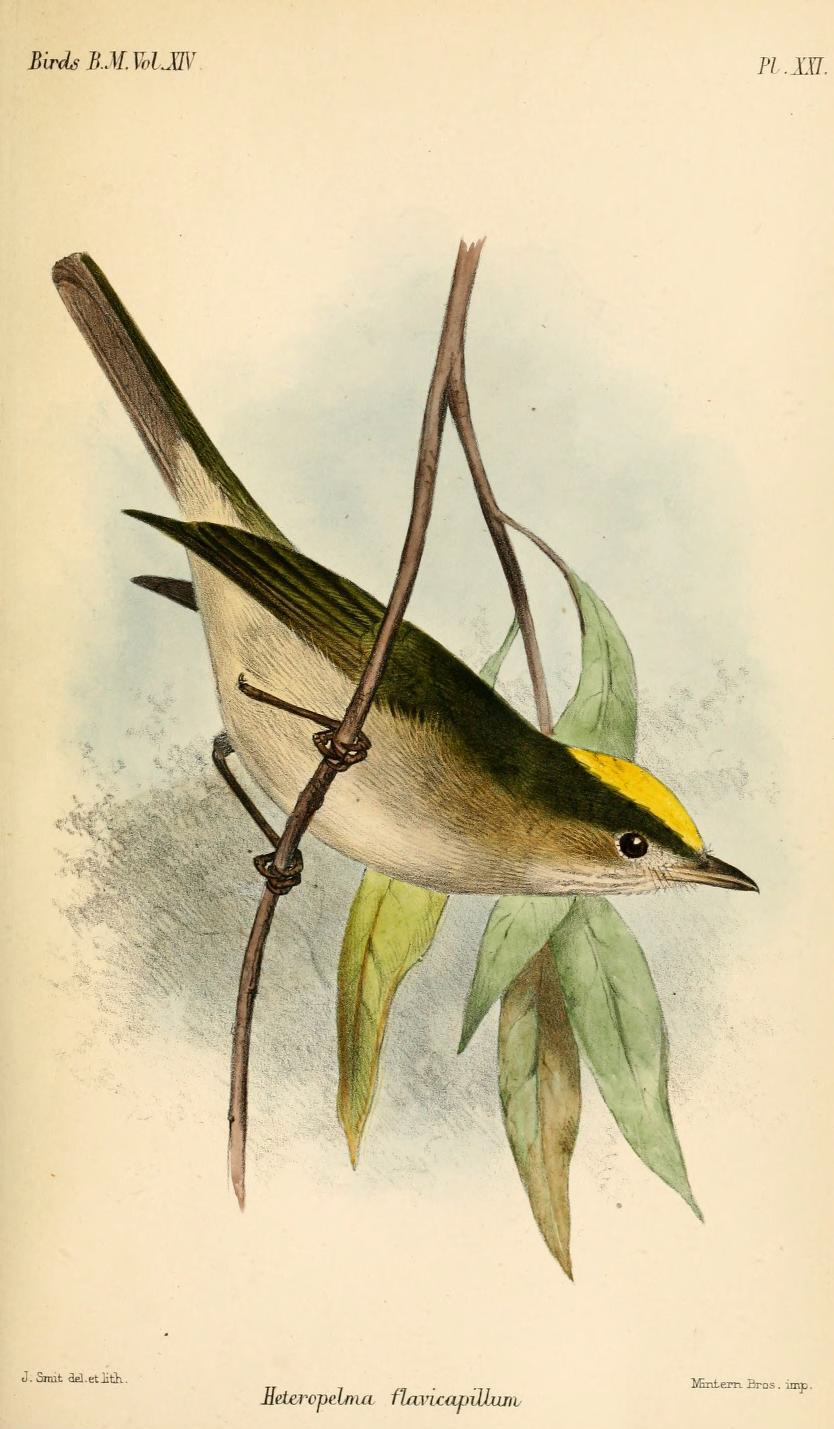
- Heteropelma flavicapillum = Xenopipo flavicapilla, Yellow-headed manakin

Scientific classification
- Kingdom: Animalia
- Phylum: Chordata
- Class: Aves
- Order: Passeriformes
- Family: Pipridae
- Genus: Chloropipo; Cabanis & Heine, 1860

Type species
- Chloropipo flavicollis Cabanis & F. Heine, Sr., 1860

Synonyms
- Xenopipo

= Chloropipo =

Genus of birds

Chloropipo is a genus of passerine birds in the family Pipridae.

It contains the following species:

- Yellow-headed manakin (Chloropipo flavicapilla)
- Jet manakin (Chloropipo unicolor)
