= Río Iglesias =

Coordinates: 8.3976°N 78.0099°W

- Corregimiento
- Location within Panama
- Country: Panama
- Province: Darién
- District: Chepigana

Area
  - Land: 481.6 km^{2} (185.9 sq mi)

Population (2010)
  - Total: 1,672
  - Density: 3.5/km^{2} (9.1/sq mi)
- Population density calculated based on land area.
- Time zone: UTC−5 (EST)

Río Iglesias is a corregimiento in Chepigana District, Darién Province, Panama with a population of 1,672 as of 2010. Its population as of 1990 was 1,348; its population as of 2000 was 1,468.

== See also ==
- Filo del Tallo
