= Agua Fría, Panama =

Agua Fría
- Corregimiento
- Location within Panama Location within Central America
- Coordinates: 8°49′24″N 78°11′22″W
- Country: Panama
- Province: Darién
- District: Chepigana
- Established: July 29, 1998

Area
  - Land: 283.7 km^{2} (109.5 sq mi)

Population (2010)
  - Total: 2,692
  - Density: 9.5/km^{2} (25/sq mi)
- Population density calculated based on land area.
- Time zone: UTC−5 (EST)

Agua Fría is a corregimiento in Chepigana District, Darién Province, Panama with a population of 2,692 as of 2010. It was created by Law 58 of July 29, 1998, owing to the Declaration of Unconstitutionality of Law 1 of 1982. Its population as of 2000 was 2,812.
