= Puerto Piña =

- Corregimiento
- Location within Panama
- Coordinates: 7°35′N 78°11′W
- Country: Panama
- Province: Darién
- District: Chepigana

Area
  - Land: 302.6 km^{2} (116.8 sq mi)

Population (2010)
  - Total: 1,113
  - Density: 3.7/km^{2} (9.6/sq mi)
- Population density calculated based on land area.
- Time zone: UTC−5 (EST)

Puerto Piña is a corregimiento in Chepigana District, Darién Province, Panama with a population of 1,113 as of 2010. Its population as of 1990 was 558; its population as of 2000 was 813. The town is served by Bahía Piña Airport, which has Air Panama flights to Panama City.

This small coastal community is located near the border with Colombia. It is the home for a tourism consortium named "Tropi" by the locals, which forms the only business of the village. The remainder of the economy consists of fishing and subsistence farming. The small town lies beside the Bahía Piña, a narrow bay between two promontories that is frequented by humpback whales and bottlenose dolphins.
