= Olindina =

Municipality of Bahia, Brazil

Coordinates: 11°22′S 38°21′W

- Municipality
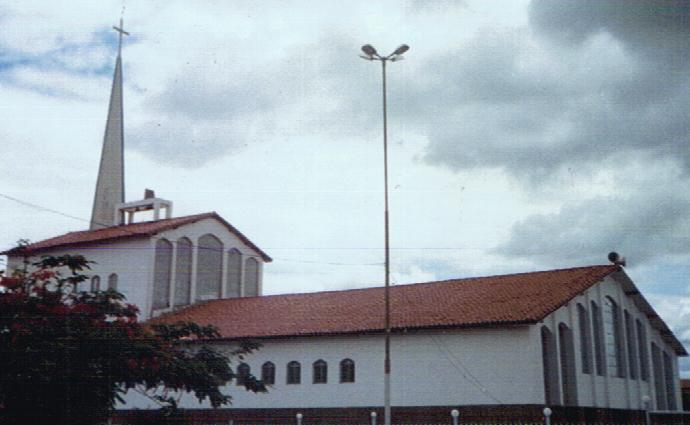

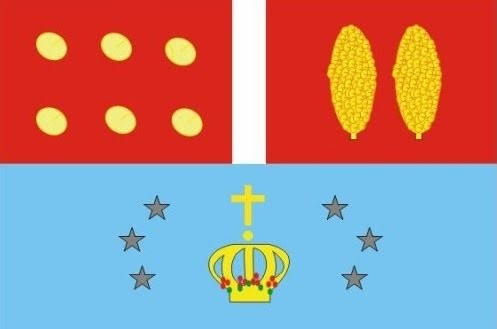
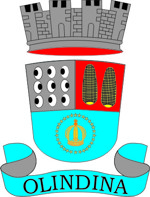
- Flag Coat of arms
- Interactive map of Olindina
- Country: Brazil
- Region: Nordeste
- State: Bahia

Population (2020)
  - Total: 28,304
- Time zone: UTC−3 (BRT)

Olindina is a municipality in the state of Bahia in the North-East region of Brazil.

== See also ==
- List of municipalities in Bahia
