= Água Fria =

Municipality of Bahia State, Brazil

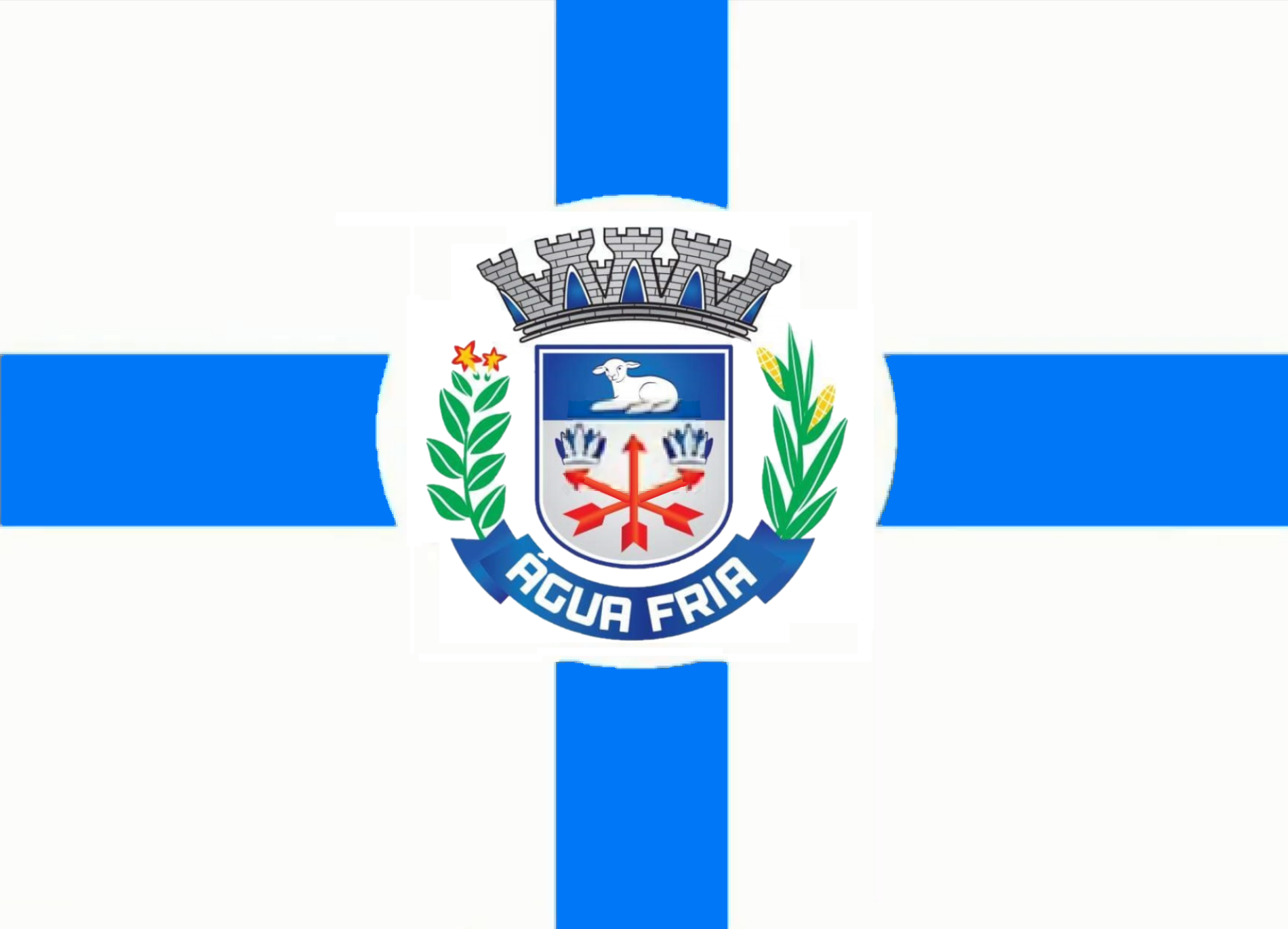
- Flag

- Coordinates: 11°52′01″S 38°46′01″W
- Country: Brazil
- Region: Nordeste
- State: Bahia

Population (2020)
  - Total: 17,033
- Time zone: UTC−3 (BRT)
- Postal code: 2900405

Água Fria (Portuguese: cold water) is a municipality in the state of Bahia in the North-East region of Brazil. It covers 662 km^{2} (256 mi^{2}), and has a population of 17,033 with a population density of 23.77 inhabitants per square kilometer.

== History ==
Água Fria was originally a Tupí settlement. The Jesuits arrived in 1582 and discovered the settlement, which was rich in both water and forests. The Tupí were hunted and enslaved by the frontiersman João Peixoto Viegas in the following period to work on cattle farms. The settlement became a municipality known as St. John Baptist de Água Fria, which was created by Imperial decree in 1727. It was absorbed into the municipality of Purificação (currently Irará) in 1842. The municipality was separated from Irará in 1962 and restored as Água Fria.

== See also ==
- List of municipalities in Bahia
