= National Institute of Statistics and Census of Panama =

Panamanian government agency

National Institute of Statistics and Census
Agency overview
- Headquarters: Panama City, Panama
- Website: www.contraloria.gob.pa/INEC/

The National Statistics and Census Institute (Spanish: Instituto Nacional de Estadística y Censo, INEC) is the Panamanian government agency responsible for the collection and processing of statistical data, such as census data.
