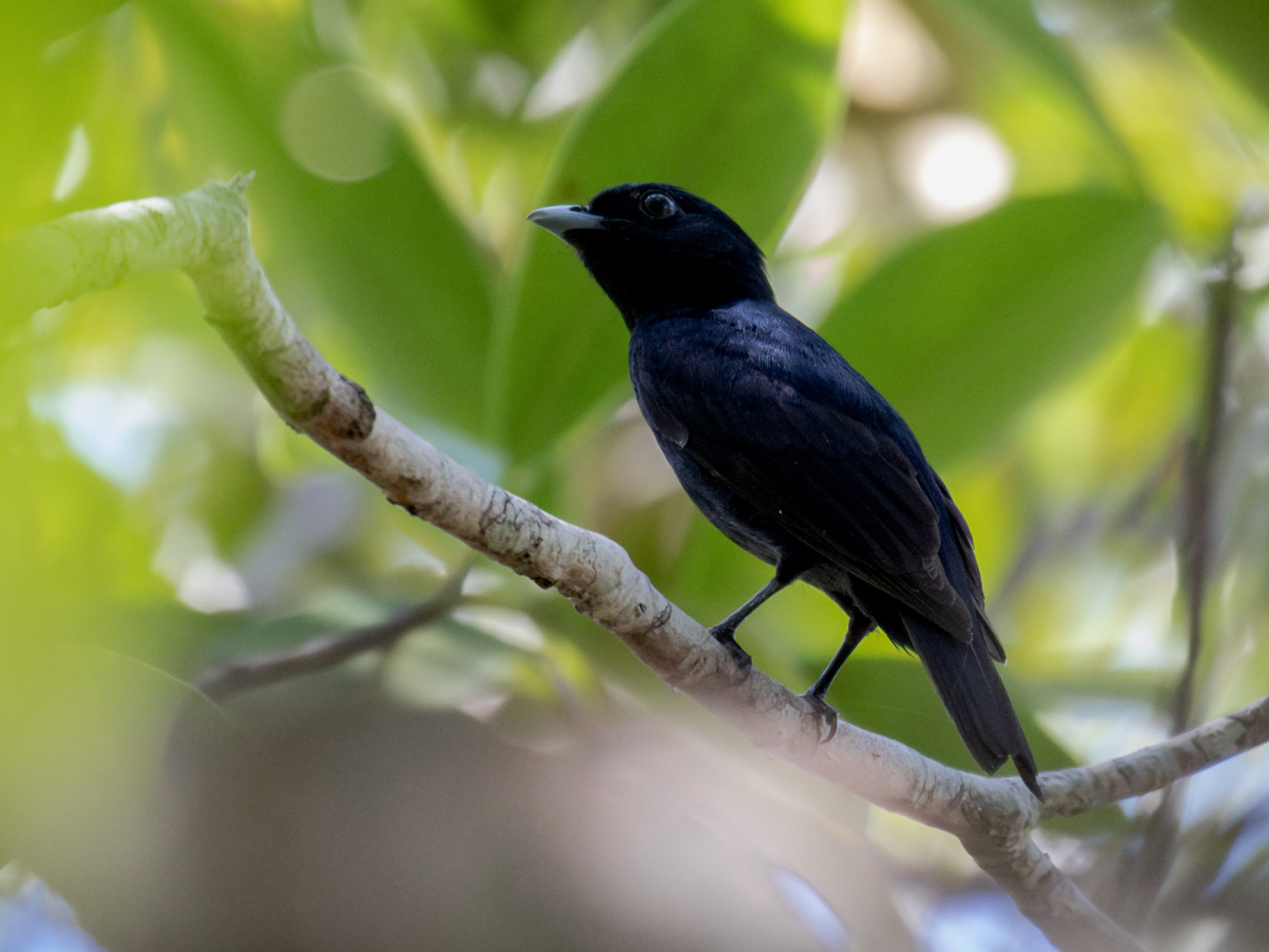
- Xenopipo atronitens

Scientific classification
- Kingdom: Animalia
- Phylum: Chordata
- Class: Aves
- Order: Passeriformes
- Family: Pipridae
- Genus: Xenopipo; Cabanis, 1847

Type species
- Xenopipo atronitens Cabanis, 1847

Synonyms
- Chloropipo

= Xenopipo =

Genus of birds

Xenopipo is a genus of bird in the family Pipridae.

== Etymology ==
Xenopipo: Greek: ξενος xenos "stranger"; New Latin: pipo "manakin".

== Species ==
It contains the following species:

- Black manakin (Xenopipo atronitens)
- Olive manakin (Xenopipo uniformis)
