= Darién Province =

Province of Panama

Darién Province Provincia de Darién
- Province
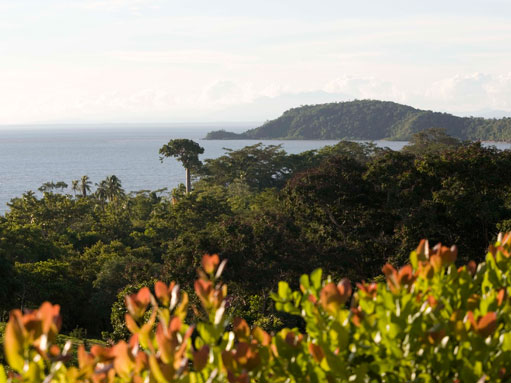
- La Palma

- Flag

- Location of Darién Province in Panama
- Coordinates: 8°25′N 78°09′W
- Country: Panama
- Founded: 1822
- Capital city: La Palma

Area
  - Total: 11,892.5 km^{2} (4,591.7 sq mi)
- Highest elevation: 2,280 m (7,480 ft)
- Lowest elevation: 0 m (0 ft)

Population (2023 census)
  - Total: 54,235
  - Density: 4.5604/km^{2} (11.811/sq mi)
- Census

GDP (PPP, constant 2015 values)
  - Year: 2023
  - Total: $700 million
  - Per capita: $12,100
- Time zone: UTC-5 (Eastern Time)
- ISO 3166 code: PA-5
- HDI (2017): 0.761 high

Darién (UK: /ˈdɛəriən, ˈdær-/, US: /ˌdɛəriˈɛn, ˌdɑːr-, dɑːrˈjɛn/; Spanish: [daˈɾjen]) is a province in Panama whose capital city is La Palma. With an area of 11,896.5 km^{2} (4,593.3 sq mi), it is located at the eastern end of the country and bordered to the north by the province of Panamá and the region of Kuna Yala. To the south, it is bordered by the Pacific Ocean and Colombia. To the east, it borders Colombia; to the west, it borders the Pacific Ocean and the province of Panama.

The area surrounding the border with Colombia is known as the Darién Gap, a large swath of undeveloped swampland and forest. With no roads, it is the missing link of the Pan-American Highway.

== Place names ==
The name originates from the language spoken by the Cueva, an Indigenous tribe destroyed by the European conquistadors during the 16th century. The Tanela River, which flows toward Atrato, was Hispanicized to Darién; the region and its communities took the same name. Santa María la Antigua del Darién, the first city founded in Tierra Firme, also took its name from the river. Subsequently, the region's boundaries were defined by the Gulf of Urabá.

== History ==
Darién Province has been inhabited by indigenous people for thousands of years. Evidence based on soil erosion suggests slash-and-burn agriculture at the latest 4000 years ago. Disappearance of paleobotanical evidence of this culture coincides with the arrival of European colonists, which likely decimated this population.

In 1508, the Spanish Crown decided to colonize the mainland, the chosen area extending from Cabo Gracias a Dios in western Central America (in the present boundary between Nicaragua and Honduras) to Cabo de la Vela, Venezuela in the east. The provinces on the mainland were Nueva Andalucía, between the Atrato River in the Gulf of Uraba and the Cabo de la Vela in Venezuela and Castilla del Oro (or Veragua), which stretched from the Atrato River to Cabo Gracias a Dios in Central America.

The Governor of Nueva Andalucía was Alonso de Ojeda and the mayor of Castilla del Oro was Diego de Nicuesa, who became the first governor of the Isthmus of Panama. Diego de Nicuesa founded Nombre de Dios in 1510. Martín Fernández de Enciso founded Santa Maria la Antigua del Darién, west of the Gulf of Urabá, in September 1510 on the advice of Vasco Núñez de Balboa, who had arrived at those lands earlier with Rodrigo de Bastidas.

On September 1, 1513, Balboa went in search of the South Sea with 190 Spaniards and 1,000 Indigenous people. He sighted the sea on September 25, 1513, and claimed it for the Spanish Crown on September 29 in the Gulf of San Miguel.

During the late 17th century there was a Scottish colonization project in the Isthmus of Panama (specifically in Darién), from which William Paterson emerged as the center of the unsuccessful attempt. The attempt to colonize by the Company of Scotland, which traded with Africa and the Indies, was part of the conflict between Spain and other 16th-century European powers in reaction to the 1494 Treaty of Tordesillas.

On July 14, 1698, Paterson left with an expedition of about 1,200 on five ships (Saint Andrew, Caledonia, Unicorn, Dolphin and Endeavour) from Leith, Scotland. The expedition landed October 30, 1698 in Anachucuna, a sandy bay in the north of Darien near Golden Island. It forged a "treaty of alliance and friendship" with an Indigenous leader, and founded in Acla a colony known as New Caledonia.

Paterson and his expedition withstood a Spanish force which attempted to confront them. However, diseases related to the climate and unsanitary conditions soon decimated the expedition. In June 1699 the Scots were forced to leave New Caledonia, despite protests from Paterson, and retreated to Jamaica.

A second expedition left Scotland on September 24, 1699, from Rothesay on the Firth of Clyde with four ships: the Rising Sun, Hamilton, Hope of Boroughstonness and Company's Hope. Paterson had a total crew of 1,300 men. On November 30, 1699, they arrived safely at the port of Caledonia, but met greater resistance from Spanish forces; they were besieged, outnumbered and without external support. On March 28, 1700, they requested that the Spanish commander set conditions for surrender.

== Government and politics ==
The Constitution of Panama of 1972, amended by the Reform Acts of 1978 and the Constitutional Act of 1983, has a unitary, republican, democratic and representative government. Three branches of government exist in all provinces of the Republic of Panama.

== Administrative divisions ==
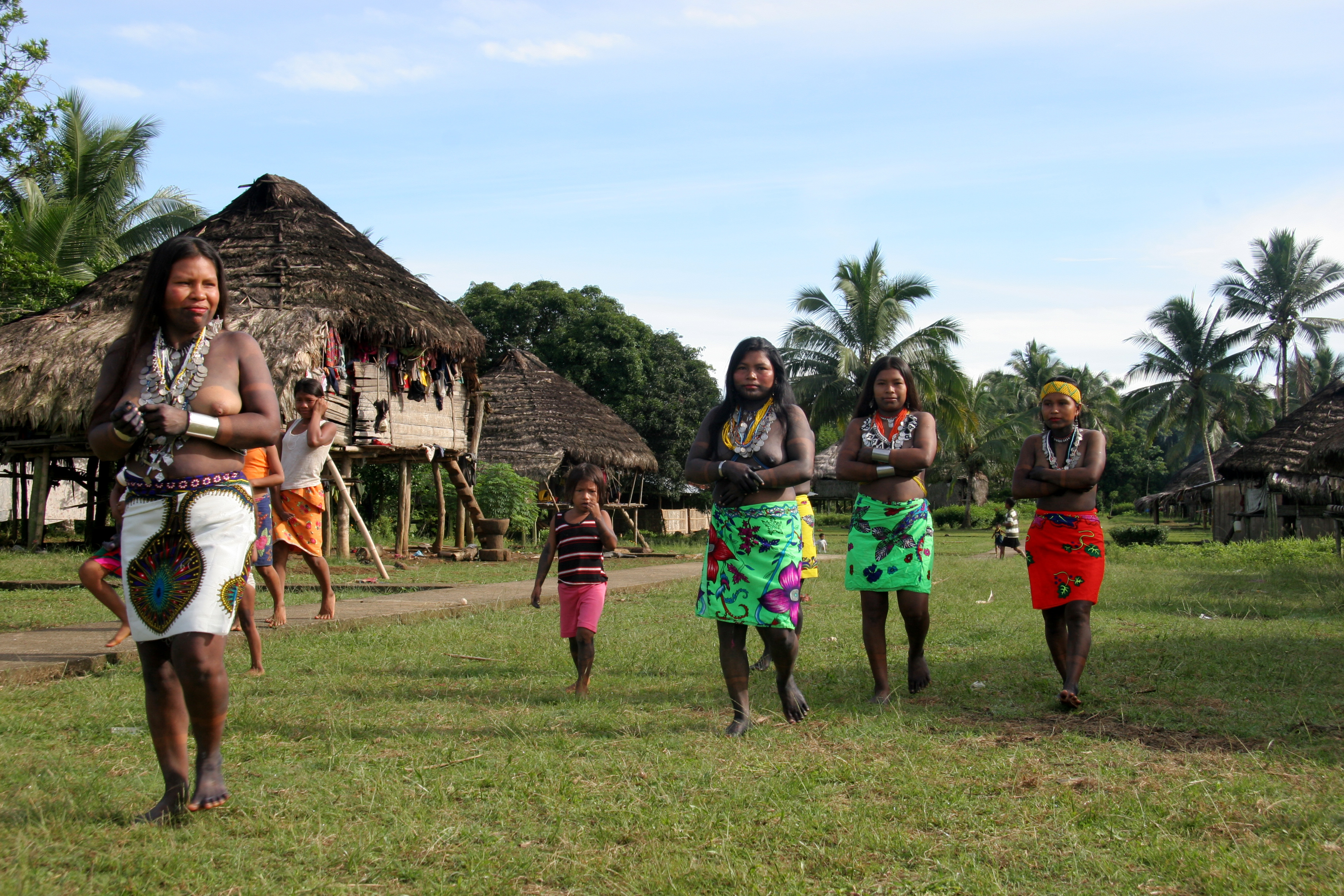
Embera-Wounaan women dressed for a dance, 2006

Darién Province is divided into three districts and 26 corregimientos.

District	Corregimientos (Subdivisions)	Cabecera (Seat)
Chepigana^{1}	La Palma, Camoganti, Chepigana, Garachiné, Jaqué, Puerto Piña, Sambú, Setegantí, Taimatí, Tucutí	La Palma
Pinogana	El Real de Santa María, Boca de Cupe, Paya, Pinogana, Púcuro, Yape, Yaviza, Metetí	El Real de Santa María
Santa Fe	Agua Fría, Cucunatí, Río Congo, Río Congo Arriba, Río Iglesias, Santa Fe, Zapallal	Santa Fe

The comarca indígena of Kuna de Wargandí, established in 2000, lies within Pinogana District and constitutes a separate corregimiento.

=== Other subdivisions formerly part of Darién ===
The comarca indígena (indigenous territory) of Emberá-Wounaan was established from the province on November 8, 1983. It consists of two districts:

- Cémaco
- Sambú

== Geography ==
Map of the Darién Gap and the break in the Pan-American Highway between Yaviza, Panama and Turbo, Colombia.

Darién Province covers an area of 11,896 square kilometres (4,593 sq mi), comparable to the island of Jamaica. It is the largest province by area, but also the smallest in population. In the centre is an undulating plain, fed by the rivers Chucunaque and Tuira and framed by steep areas of the highlands of San Blas, Bagre, Pirre, and the Saltos. Among the highest mountains in the province are Tacarcuna at 2,280 metres (7,480 ft), Piña at 1,581 metres (5,187 ft), Pirre at 1,569 metres (5,148 ft), Nique at 1,550 metres (5,090 ft), Chucantí at 1,430 metres (4,690 ft), Tanela at 1,415 metres (4,642 ft) and Upper Quia at 1,361 metres (4,465 ft).

Eight percent of the province's land is suitable for intensive cultivation, 60 percent is suitable for pasture, permanent crops and forestry production and 25 percent is protected forest reserves. The dominant natural vegetation is forests which, according to the topographic elevation and rainfall patterns, are classified as tropical moist, subtropical moist and cloud forest.

== Climate ==
Rainfall reaches 1,700 to 2,000 mm (67 to 79 in) near the inlet of Garachiné, with a marked dry period between January and April (a tropical savanna climate, Aw on the Köppen climate classification). However, in the foothills and valleys of the province's interior precipitation can exceed 8,000 mm (310 in) per year with virtually no dry season (a tropical rainforest climate, Köppen Af); this ranks the area among the rainiest regions on earth. The temperature varies, by altitude, between 17 and 35 °C (63 and 95 °F). The soil types and their suitability for use are primarily associated with topographic variations and geological-material generators.

== Hydrology ==
The watersheds in Darién Province form extensive sedimentary waterways, pouring their waters into rivers such as the 231-kilometre (144 mi) Rio Chucunaque and the 230-km Tuira (the longest, most treacherous rivers in Panama). The hydrographic system in the province shows a minimum flow in March and April and a maximum in November.

The use of water resources is largely limited to the provision of potable water to 15 towns. The lack of detailed information on topography and hydrometeorology makes it difficult to estimate hydropower potential, but possible candidates are the Pirre, Antad, Tuira, Chico and Yape Rivers.

== Demographics ==
The province's population is small, dispersed and heterogeneous, located in small towns linked to waterways. Significant migration flows to and from the province have been recorded.

In 1970 the population totaled 22,685, primarily mulattoes, black people, indigenous Colombian Chocoanos and settlers from other areas of Panama. Approximately 60 percent of the population is located in 523 towns of less than 500 inhabitants each.

In 2000 the Census of Population and Housing indicated that the May population of Darién was 40,284 inhabitants living in 11,514 dwellings in 613 towns.

Preliminary data from the XI National Census of Population and Housing VI show that as of May 16, 2010 Darién has a population of 46,951 inhabitants, of which 25,764 are men and 21,187 women. There were a total of 15,310 homes. At the 2023 census 54,235 people were counted.

== Culture ==
The population is primarily indigenous, Afro-Descendants, and settlers who migrated from other provinces (mainly Santeña, Herrerano and Veraguas) in search of free land. Groups who have migrated to the province are trying to preserve their customs and traditions which are distinct from Colombian culture.

The characteristic dance of the people of Darién is the bullerengue, a drum dance originating in Africa. Radio stations play bullerengue; stations nearer the Colombian border favor vallenato music.

Common foods include guacho de mariscos (fish with coconut rice) and serendengue. Choca'o (stewed plantain) is a traditional drink.

Women usually wear hand-sewn dresses, while men dress for business. Primary crops grown in the province are maize, rice, plantains, bananas, cassava, yams and beans. In the Gulf of San Miguel shrimp, fish and lobster are abundant; a fishing fleet operates from Panama City. In the inland rivers of the province, fishing is mainly for sustenance. The lumber industry yields valuable woods such as cedar, balsa, balsam, mahogany and cocobolo.

== Videos ==
- Tierra Adentro (Inland) a film documentary by Mauro Colombo. At the dangerous border between these two countries, guerrillas, immigrants, indigenous people, farmers, drug traffickers, local police, and wild animals cross paths. (presented at Rotterdam international Film Festival in 2019).

== General and cited references ==
- Alì, Maurizio. (2012). "Megaproyectos y efectos perversos de la modernidad: el bizarro caso de Uraba". Revista Perfiles Libertadores, 8: 72–80. Bogotá, Colombia. Fundación Universitaria Los Libertadores. ISSN 2248-5724
- Panama in Figures: 2000–2004 Statistics and Census of the Comptroller General of the Republic of Panama.
