= Chepigana District =

Chepigana
- District

- Location of the district capital in Panama
- Coordinates: 8°24′36″N 78°9′0″W
- Country: Panama
- Province: Darién Province
- Capital: La Palma

Area
  - Total: 4,625.1 km^{2} (1,785.8 sq mi)

Population (2010 Census)
  - Total: 30,110
- Time zone: UTC-5 (ETZ)

Chepigana District (Spanish pronunciation: [tʃepiˈɣana]) is a district (distrito) of Darién Province in Panama. The population according to the 2000 census was 27,461, and had risen to 30,110 in the 2010 census, prior to the creation of Santa Fe District. Since the separation of Santa Fe District, Chepigana covers a total area of 4,625.1 square kilometres (1,785.8 sq mi). The capital lies at the town of La Palma.

On 14 July 2017, the National Assembly decreed the separation of seven corregimientos from Chepigana District to create Santa Fe District, which took effect in 2018.

== Administrative divisions ==
Since 2018, Chepigana District has been divided into the following corregimientos:

- La Palma
- Camoganti
- Chepigana
- Garachiné
- Jaqué
- Puerto Piña
- Sambú
- Setegantí
- Taimatí
- Tucutí
