= Geography of Panama =

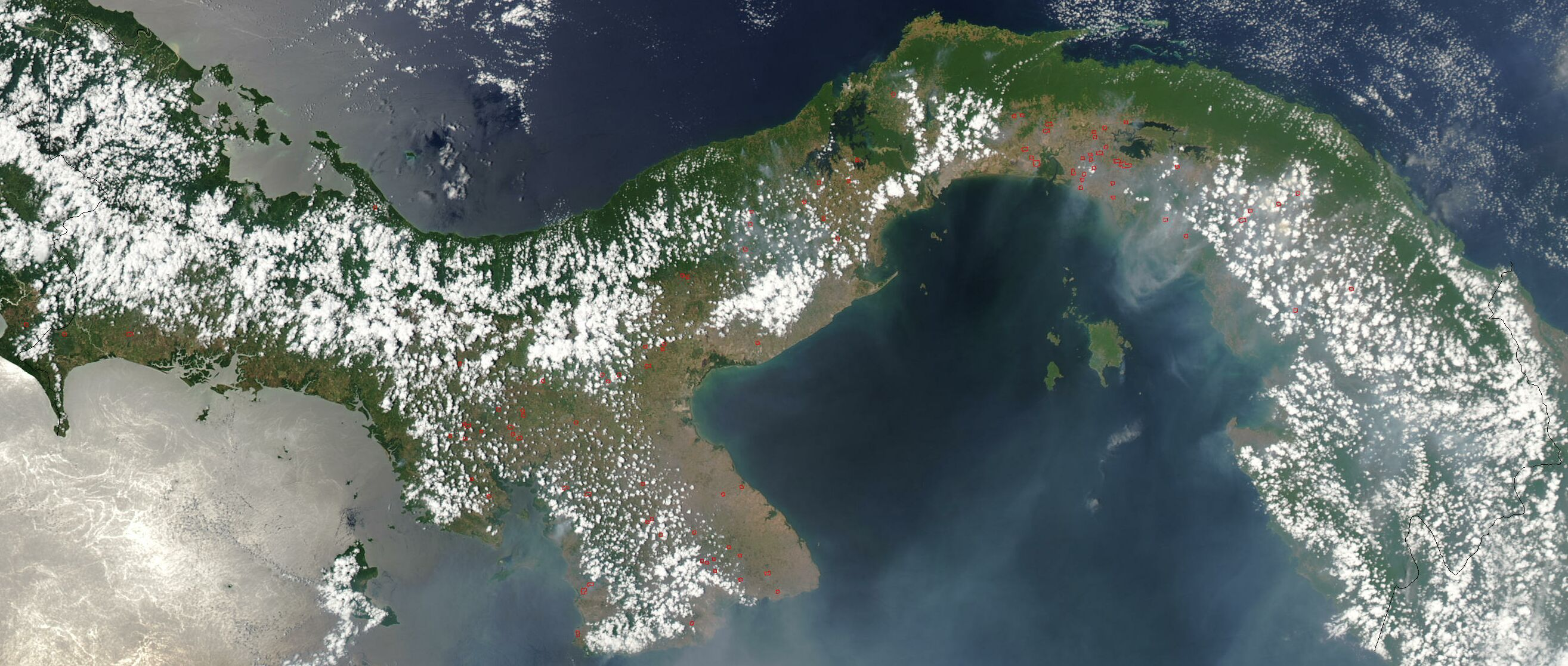
- Continent: Americas
- Region: Central America
- Coordinates: 9°00′N 80°00′W
- Area: Ranked 116th
  - Total: 75,417 km^{2} (29,119 sq mi)
  - Land: 98.57%
  - Water: 1.43%
- Coastline: 2,490 km (1,550 mi)
- Borders: Total border: 555 km (345 mi)
- Highest point: Volcán Barú; 3,475 metres (11,401 ft)
- Lowest point: Pacific Ocean; 0 metres (0 ft)
- Longest river: Chucunaque River; 231 km (144 mi)
- Largest lake: Gatun Lake; 425 km^{2} (164 mi^{2})
- Exclusive economic zone: 335,646 km^{2} (129,594 mi^{2})

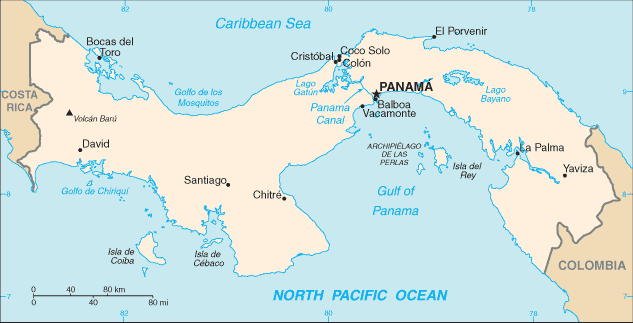
A map of Panama

Panama is a country located in Central America, bordering both the Caribbean Sea and the Pacific Ocean, between Colombia and Costa Rica. Panama is located on the narrow and low Isthmus of Panama.

This S-shaped isthmus is situated between 7° and 10° north latitude and 77° and 83° west longitude. Panama encompasses approximately 75,417 km^{2} (29,119 mi^{2}). It is 772 km (480 mi) long, and between 60 and 177 kilometers (37 and 110 miles) wide.

== Elevation ==
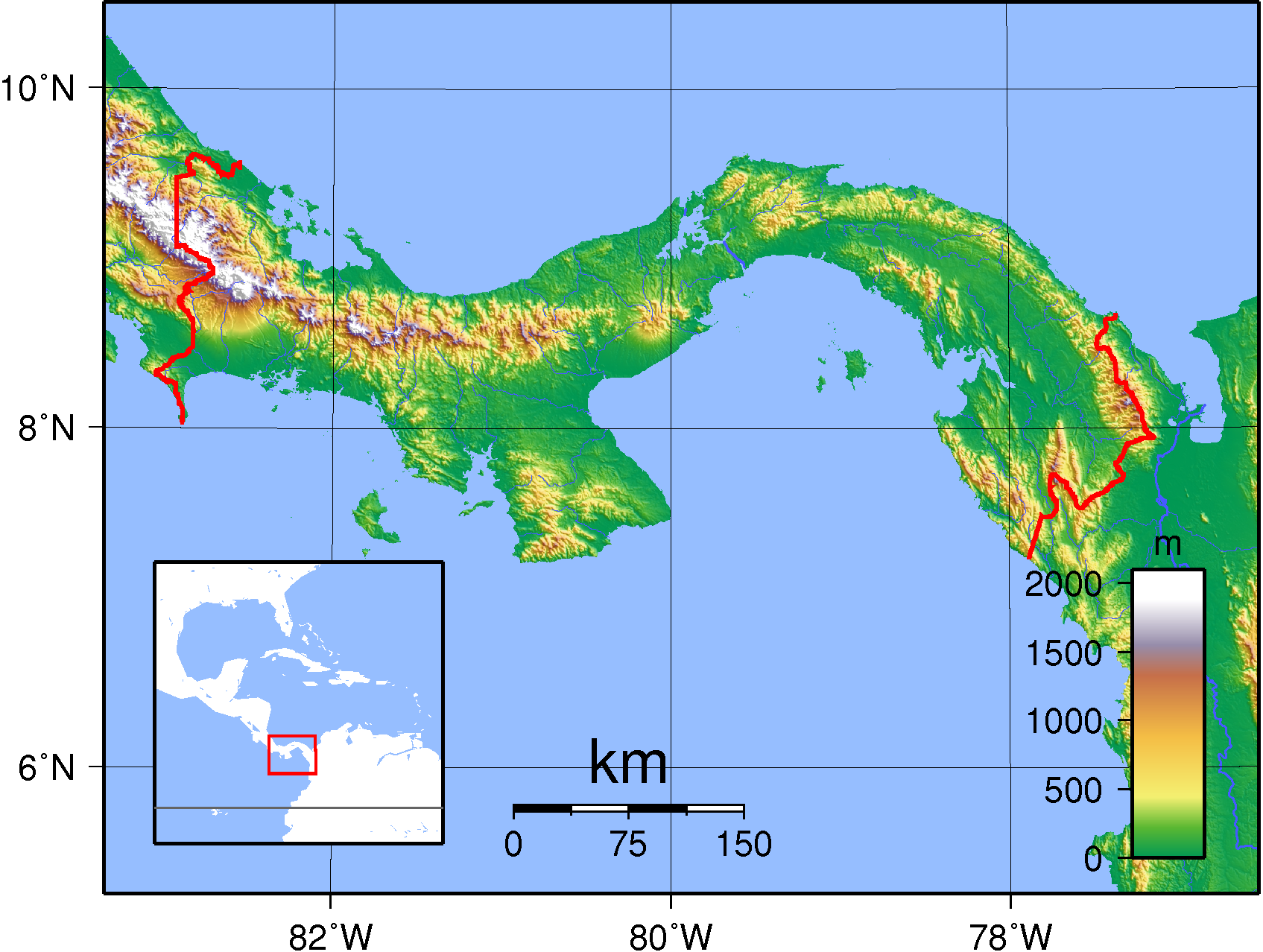
Panama's topography

The dominant feature of Panama's landform is the central spine of mountains and hills that forms the continental divide. The divide does not form part of the great mountain chains of North America, and only near the Colombian border are there highlands related to the Andean system of South America. The spine that forms the divide is the highly eroded arch of an uplift from the sea bottom, in which peaks were formed by volcanic intrusions.

The western portion of the spine, the Cordillera Central, extends from Costa Rica to a low saddle near the Panama Canal. Within the Cordillera Central are three ranges. The lofty Cordillera de Talamanca extends east from Costa Rica and contains Panama's highest peak, Volcán Barú, at 3,475 meters (11,401 ft). Volcán Barú last erupted in 1550 and is the apex of a highland that includes Panama's richest soil. Further east are the lower Serranía de Tabasará and Sierra de Veraguas ranges, the latter extending towards the Panama Canal.

== Climate ==
Panama map of Köppen climate classification zones

Panama has a tropical climate. Temperatures are uniformly high—as is the relative humidity—and there is little seasonal variation. Diurnal ranges are low; on a typical dry-season day in the capital city, the early morning minimum may be 24 °C (75.2 °F) and the afternoon maximum 29 °C (84.2 °F). The temperature seldom exceeds 32 °C (89.6 °F) for more than a short time.

Temperatures on the Pacific side of the isthmus are somewhat lower than on the Caribbean, and breezes tend to rise after dusk in most parts of the country. Temperatures are markedly cooler in the higher parts of the mountain ranges, and frosts occur in the Cordillera de Talamanca in western Panama, with pipes having been frozen at as low as 7,000 ft (2,100 m) elevation.

Climatic regions are determined less on the basis of temperature than on rainfall, which varies regionally from less than 1,300 millimeters (51.2 in) to more than 3,000 millimeters (118.1 in) per year. Almost all of the rain falls during the rainy season, which is usually from May through November, but varies in length from seven to nine months, with certain exception due to monsoons. The cycle of rainfall is determined primarily by two factors: moisture from the Caribbean, which is transported by north and northeast winds prevailing during most of the year, and the continental divide, which acts as a rain shield for the Pacific lowlands. Panama lies outside the Main Development Region for tropical cyclone activity.

A third influence that is present during the late autumn is the southwest wind off the Pacific. This wind brings some precipitation to the Pacific lowlands, modified by the highlands of the Península de Azuero, which form a partial rainshield for much of central Panama. Rainfall is generally much heavier on the Caribbean than on the Pacific side. The annual average in Panama City is little more than half of that in Colón.

=== Examples ===
Pacific Coast

Climate data for Panama City (1971–2000)
| Month | Jan | Feb | Mar | Apr | May | Jun | Jul | Aug | Sep | Oct | Nov | Dec | Year |
|---|---|---|---|---|---|---|---|---|---|---|---|---|---|
| Mean daily maximum °C (°F) | 31.7 (89.1) | 31.7 (89.1) | 32.2 (90.0) | 32.2 (90.0) | 31.1 (88.0) | 30.6 (87.1) | 30.6 (87.1) | 30.6 (87.1) | 30.0 (86.0) | 29.4 (84.9) | 30.0 (86.0) | 30.6 (87.1) | 30.9 (87.6) |
| Daily mean °C (°F) | 28.1 (82.6) | 28.1 (82.6) | 28.6 (83.5) | 28.9 (84.0) | 28.3 (82.9) | 27.8 (82.0) | 27.8 (82.0) | 27.8 (82.0) | 27.2 (81.0) | 27.0 (80.6) | 27.2 (81.0) | 27.5 (81.5) | 27.9 (82.1) |
| Mean daily minimum °C (°F) | 24.4 (75.9) | 24.4 (75.9) | 25.0 (77.0) | 25.6 (78.1) | 25.6 (78.1) | 25.0 (77.0) | 25.0 (77.0) | 25.0 (77.0) | 24.4 (75.9) | 24.4 (75.9) | 24.4 (75.9) | 24.4 (75.9) | 24.8 (76.6) |
| Average rainfall mm (inches) | 29.3 (1.15) | 10.1 (0.40) | 13.1 (0.52) | 64.7 (2.55) | 225.1 (8.86) | 235.0 (9.25) | 168.5 (6.63) | 219.9 (8.66) | 253.9 (10.00) | 330.7 (13.02) | 252.3 (9.93) | 104.6 (4.12) | 1,907.2 (75.09) |
| Average rainy days (≥ 0.1 mm) | 2.9 | 1.3 | 1.4 | 4.9 | 15.0 | 16.0 | 14.0 | 15.0 | 17.0 | 20.0 | 16.0 | 7.5 | 131.0 |
| Mean monthly sunshine hours | 228.9 | 245.2 | 183.9 | 173.1 | 108.5 | 116.3 | 106.1 | 118.1 | 99.2 | 103.9 | 139.8 | 120.5 | 1,743.5 |
Source 1: World Meteorological Organization
Source 2: ETESA (sunshine data recorded at Albrook Field)

Caribbean coast

Climate data for Colón
| Month | Jan | Feb | Mar | Apr | May | Jun | Jul | Aug | Sep | Oct | Nov | Dec | Year |
|---|---|---|---|---|---|---|---|---|---|---|---|---|---|
| Mean daily maximum °C (°F) | 29 (84) | 29 (84) | 29 (85) | 30 (86) | 31 (87) | 30 (86) | 29 (85) | 29 (85) | 31 (87) | 30 (86) | 29 (84) | 29 (84) | 29 (85) |
| Mean daily minimum °C (°F) | 24 (76) | 24 (76) | 24 (76) | 25 (77) | 24 (76) | 24 (75) | 24 (75) | 24 (75) | 24 (75) | 23 (74) | 23 (74) | 24 (75) | 24 (75) |
| Average rainfall mm (inches) | 110 (4.3) | 51 (2.0) | 36 (1.4) | 94 (3.7) | 270 (10.8) | 370 (14.5) | 420 (16.5) | 420 (16.4) | 290 (11.5) | 470 (18.4) | 620 (24.4) | 320 (12.6) | 3,471 (136.5) |
Source: Weatherbase

Interior lowlands

Climate data for Santiago de Veraguas (1991–2020)
| Month | Jan | Feb | Mar | Apr | May | Jun | Jul | Aug | Sep | Oct | Nov | Dec | Year |
|---|---|---|---|---|---|---|---|---|---|---|---|---|---|
| Record high °C (°F) | 37.0 (98.6) | 38.0 (100.4) | 39.4 (102.9) | 39.4 (102.9) | 38.4 (101.1) | 36.6 (97.9) | 36.4 (97.5) | 35.6 (96.1) | 36.4 (97.5) | 35.2 (95.4) | 35.2 (95.4) | 36.0 (96.8) | 39.4 (102.9) |
| Mean daily maximum °C (°F) | 33.0 (91.4) | 34.4 (93.9) | 35.3 (95.5) | 35.1 (95.2) | 33.1 (91.6) | 32.0 (89.6) | 31.9 (89.4) | 32.0 (89.6) | 31.8 (89.2) | 30.9 (87.6) | 31.0 (87.8) | 32.0 (89.6) | 32.7 (90.9) |
| Daily mean °C (°F) | 26.8 (80.2) | 27.7 (81.9) | 28.3 (82.9) | 28.7 (83.7) | 28.0 (82.4) | 27.4 (81.3) | 27.2 (81.0) | 27.3 (81.1) | 27.0 (80.6) | 26.7 (80.1) | 26.7 (80.1) | 26.8 (80.2) | 27.4 (81.3) |
| Mean daily minimum °C (°F) | 20.5 (68.9) | 20.9 (69.6) | 21.3 (70.3) | 22.3 (72.1) | 23.0 (73.4) | 22.9 (73.2) | 22.5 (72.5) | 22.6 (72.7) | 22.2 (72.0) | 22.4 (72.3) | 22.3 (72.1) | 21.5 (70.7) | 22.0 (71.6) |
| Record low °C (°F) | 15.6 (60.1) | 15.6 (60.1) | 16.6 (61.9) | 16.8 (62.2) | 18.0 (64.4) | 19.4 (66.9) | 18.0 (64.4) | 18.8 (65.8) | 18.2 (64.8) | 17.8 (64.0) | 18.8 (65.8) | 15.2 (59.4) | 15.2 (59.4) |
| Average rainfall mm (inches) | 22.5 (0.89) | 16.7 (0.66) | 20.9 (0.82) | 96.7 (3.81) | 313.7 (12.35) | 300.8 (11.84) | 243.0 (9.57) | 317.3 (12.49) | 342.4 (13.48) | 395.5 (15.57) | 259.3 (10.21) | 82.7 (3.26) | 2,411.5 (94.95) |
| Average rainy days (≥ 0.1 mm) | 2.3 | 1.1 | 1.8 | 6.2 | 17 | 18 | 15 | 18 | 20 | 21 | 17 | 6.6 | 144 |
| Mean monthly sunshine hours | 235.1 | 243.3 | 247.6 | 202.6 | 160.0 | 124.6 | 133.2 | 139.1 | 128.0 | 129.8 | 139.3 | 182.2 | 2,064.8 |
Source 1: World Meteorological Organization
Source 2:

Climate data for David, Chiriquí
| Month | Jan | Feb | Mar | Apr | May | Jun | Jul | Aug | Sep | Oct | Nov | Dec | Year |
|---|---|---|---|---|---|---|---|---|---|---|---|---|---|
| Mean daily maximum °C (°F) | 32.2 (90.0) | 33.3 (91.9) | 33.9 (93.0) | 33.3 (91.9) | 31.7 (89.1) | 31.1 (88.0) | 30.6 (87.1) | 30.6 (87.1) | 30.6 (87.1) | 30.0 (86.0) | 30.0 (86.0) | 31.1 (88.0) | 31.5 (88.7) |
| Daily mean °C (°F) | 26.9 (80.4) | 27.8 (82.0) | 28.4 (83.1) | 28.3 (82.9) | 27.5 (81.5) | 27.2 (81.0) | 27.0 (80.6) | 26.7 (80.1) | 26.7 (80.1) | 26.4 (79.5) | 26.4 (79.5) | 26.7 (80.1) | 27.2 (80.9) |
| Mean daily minimum °C (°F) | 21.7 (71.1) | 22.2 (72.0) | 22.8 (73.0) | 23.3 (73.9) | 23.3 (73.9) | 23.3 (73.9) | 23.3 (73.9) | 22.8 (73.0) | 22.8 (73.0) | 22.8 (73.0) | 22.8 (73.0) | 22.2 (72.0) | 22.8 (73.0) |
| Average rainfall mm (inches) | 33.3 (1.31) | 19.3 (0.76) | 35.5 (1.40) | 102.5 (4.04) | 297.0 (11.69) | 322.6 (12.70) | 289.8 (11.41) | 340.3 (13.40) | 406.6 (16.01) | 400.5 (15.77) | 295.4 (11.63) | 77.4 (3.05) | 2,620.2 (103.17) |
| Average relative humidity (%) | 67.7 | 62.6 | 62.4 | 69.6 | 79.5 | 81.1 | 80.4 | 81.1 | 82.1 | 83.8 | 82.8 | 75.5 | 75.7 |
| Mean monthly sunshine hours | 275.5 | 262.0 | 270.5 | 216.2 | 160.4 | 128.3 | 141.1 | 148.6 | 135.4 | 139.5 | 154.5 | 218.7 | 2,250.7 |
Source 1: World Meteorological Organisation (UN) (30 yr record),
Source 2: ETESA (humidity and sun values)

Highlands

Climate data for Boquete
| Month | Jan | Feb | Mar | Apr | May | Jun | Jul | Aug | Sep | Oct | Nov | Dec | Year |
|---|---|---|---|---|---|---|---|---|---|---|---|---|---|
| Record high °C (°F) | 31.0 (87.8) | 30.2 (86.4) | 31.0 (87.8) | 31.0 (87.8) | 30.5 (86.9) | 29.5 (85.1) | 30.6 (87.1) | 29.8 (85.6) | 29.5 (85.1) | 28.8 (83.8) | 30.4 (86.7) | 29.2 (84.6) | 31.0 (87.8) |
| Mean daily maximum °C (°F) | 23.2 (73.8) | 23.2 (73.8) | 24.3 (75.7) | 24.3 (75.7) | 24.3 (75.7) | 24.0 (75.2) | 23.7 (74.7) | 23.7 (74.7) | 23.4 (74.1) | 23.5 (74.3) | 23.2 (73.8) | 22.7 (72.9) | 23.6 (74.5) |
| Daily mean °C (°F) | 19.5 (67.1) | 19.2 (66.6) | 20.2 (68.4) | 20.3 (68.5) | 20.6 (69.1) | 20.6 (69.1) | 20.4 (68.7) | 20.4 (68.7) | 20.0 (68.0) | 20.0 (68.0) | 19.8 (67.6) | 19.2 (66.6) | 20.0 (68.0) |
| Mean daily minimum °C (°F) | 15.8 (60.4) | 15.2 (59.4) | 16.2 (61.2) | 16.3 (61.3) | 16.9 (62.4) | 17.1 (62.8) | 17.1 (62.8) | 17.0 (62.6) | 16.7 (62.1) | 16.5 (61.7) | 16.4 (61.5) | 15.7 (60.3) | 16.4 (61.5) |
| Record low °C (°F) | 4.0 (39.2) | 4.6 (40.3) | 4.0 (39.2) | 3.4 (38.1) | 6.0 (42.8) | 5.0 (41.0) | 4.0 (39.2) | 4.2 (39.6) | 2.8 (37.0) | 4.2 (39.6) | 3.0 (37.4) | 3.0 (37.4) | 2.8 (37.0) |
| Average rainfall mm (inches) | 52.3 (2.06) | 26.6 (1.05) | 36.7 (1.44) | 76.1 (3.00) | 284.2 (11.19) | 317.2 (12.49) | 224.5 (8.84) | 293.8 (11.57) | 397.4 (15.65) | 411.7 (16.21) | 219.8 (8.65) | 101.3 (3.99) | 2,441.6 (96.14) |
Source 1: Climates to travel
Source 2: IMHPA (rainfall and temperature records)

== Vegetation ==
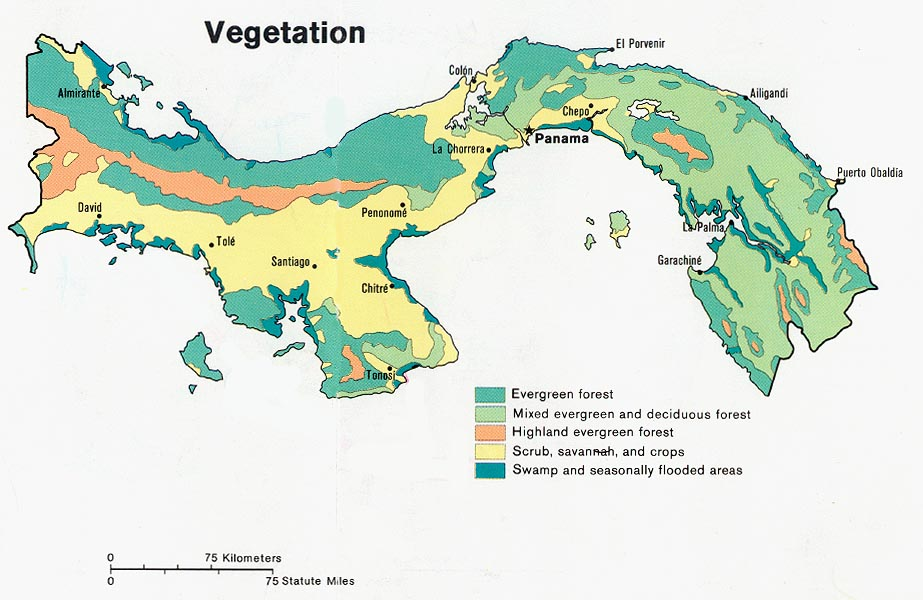
Panama's vegetation, 1981

Panama's tropical environment supports an abundance of plants. Forests dominate, interrupted in places by grasslands, scrub, and crops. Nearly 40 percent of Panama is wooded. Deforestation is a continuing threat to the rain-drenched woodlands. Tree cover has been reduced by more than 50 percent since the 1940s.

Subsistence farming, widely practiced from the northeastern jungles to the southwestern grasslands, consists largely of corn, bean, and tuber plots. Mangrove swamps occur along parts of both coasts, with banana plantations occupying deltas near Costa Rica. In many places, a multi-canopied rain forest abuts the swamp on one side of Panama and increases to the lower reaches of slopes in the other.

=== REDD+ reference levels and monitoring ===
Under the UNFCCC REDD+ framework, Panama has submitted three national forest reference level (FRL) packages. On the UNFCCC REDD+ Web Platform, the country's 2018 and 2022 packages are listed as having assessed reference levels, while a 2025 package is listed as under technical assessment. All three list a national strategy and safeguards information; a national forest monitoring system is listed as reported only for the 2022 package.

Panama's first assessed FRL, submitted in 2018, covered all five REDD+ activities at national scale. After revision during the technical assessment process, the assessed FRL was -27,735,675 t CO2 eq per year for a 2000-2015 reference period, revised from -56,991,334 t CO2 eq per year for 2006-2015 in the original submission. The technical assessment states that it included CO2 emissions and removals, together with CH_{4} and N_{2}O from forest fires, and covered above-ground biomass, below-ground biomass, deadwood and litter, while excluding soil organic carbon.

A second national FRL, technically assessed in 2022, again covered all five REDD+ activities at national scale and used a 2006-2015 reference period. The original and modified submissions both reported -20,433,129.66 t CO2 eq per year, which was also the assessed value. The assessment states that it again included CO2 emissions and removals, plus CH_{4} and N_{2}O from fires, and covered above-ground biomass, below-ground biomass, deadwood and litter, while excluding soil organic carbon.

A third national FRL submission, made in 2025 and listed on the platform as under technical assessment, proposes a benchmark of -17,940,747.02 t CO2 eq per year based on a 2016-2020 reference period, for reporting results from 2021 onward. According to the submission, it again covers all five REDD+ activities at national scale and includes above-ground biomass, below-ground biomass, deadwood, litter and soil organic carbon, while excluding harvested wood products.

=== Tree cover extent and loss ===
Global Forest Watch publishes annual estimates of tree cover loss and 2000 tree cover extent derived from time-series analysis of Landsat satellite imagery in the Global Forest Change dataset. In this framework, tree cover refers to vegetation taller than 5 m (including natural forests and tree plantations), and tree cover loss is defined as the complete removal of tree cover canopy for a given year, regardless of cause.

For Panama, country statistics report cumulative tree cover loss of 530,647 ha (5,306.47 km^{2}) from 2001 to 2024 (about 9.3% of its 2000 tree cover area). For tree cover density greater than 30%, country statistics report a 2000 tree cover extent of 5,734,588 ha (57,345.88 km^{2}). The charts and table below display this data. In simple terms, the annual loss number is the area where tree cover disappeared in that year, and the extent number shows what remains of the 2000 tree cover baseline after subtracting cumulative loss. Forest regrowth is not included in the dataset.

Annual tree cover loss in Panama, 2001–2024. View chart definition.
Tree cover extent in 2000 minus cumulative tree cover loss in Panama, 2001–2024 (loss-only residual; does not account for gain). View chart definition.

Annual tree cover extent and loss
| Year | Tree cover extent (km2) (Note: This residual measure does not include forest regrowth.) | Annual tree cover loss (km2) |
|---|---|---|
| 2001 | 57,163.20 | 182.68 |
| 2002 | 56,971.14 | 192.06 |
| 2003 | 56,858.29 | 112.85 |
| 2004 | 56,689.77 | 168.52 |
| 2005 | 56,565.82 | 123.95 |
| 2006 | 56,222.39 | 343.43 |
| 2007 | 56,015.81 | 206.58 |
| 2008 | 55,616.25 | 399.56 |
| 2009 | 55,245.81 | 370.44 |
| 2010 | 55,091.45 | 154.36 |
| 2011 | 54,860.14 | 231.31 |
| 2012 | 54,689.19 | 170.95 |
| 2013 | 54,548.58 | 140.61 |
| 2014 | 54,407.72 | 140.86 |
| 2015 | 54,301.80 | 105.92 |
| 2016 | 54,128.01 | 173.79 |
| 2017 | 53,818.31 | 309.70 |
| 2018 | 53,538.18 | 280.13 |
| 2019 | 53,197.84 | 340.34 |
| 2020 | 52,924.05 | 273.79 |
| 2021 | 52,679.73 | 244.32 |
| 2022 | 52,506.09 | 173.64 |
| 2023 | 52,254.94 | 251.15 |
| 2024 | 52,039.41 | 215.53 |

== Coastline ==
The Republic of Panama has a total coastline of approximately 2,988.3 kilometers (1,856.8 mi), significantly longer than the 2,490 km figure often cited for its land area alone, as this measurement includes its numerous islands and coastal indentations. This coastline is almost equally divided between the country's two maritime fronts, with 1,700.6 km (1,056.7 mi) on the Pacific Ocean and 1,287.7 km (800.1 mi) on the Caribbean Sea. The shape of the isthmus creates markedly different coastal characteristics: the Caribbean coast is generally concave and lined with hundreds of islands, while the Pacific coast is deeply convex and features extensive gulfs and peninsulas.

The Caribbean coastline is noted for its natural harbors and archipelagos. Near the Costa Rican border, the Almirante Bay area is sheltered by the islands of the Bocas del Toro Archipelago, which protects the major banana port of Almirante. Further east, the Guna Yala comarca (San Blas) coastline is fringed by the hundreds of low, sandy islands of the San Blas Archipelago, which stretch for over 160 km (99 mi) along the coast.

The Pacific coast is dominated by the massive Gulf of Panama, which is 100 miles wide at its mouth and contains the Pearl Islands (Archipiélago de las Perlas), an archipelago of over 200 islands. To the west, the Azuero Peninsula projects southward, separating the Gulf of Panama from the Golfo de Chiriquí. The Pacific coast is characterized by an extreme tidal range—a variation of over 7 meters (23 feet) between high and low tide—which creates extensive tidal flats that can extend up to 70 km (43 mi) seaward. This contrasts sharply with the Caribbean coast, where the tidal range is only about 70 centimeters (2.3 ft). These Pacific coastal waters are also home to significant ecological zones, such as the Gulf of Montijo in Veraguas Province, a Ramsar wetland of international importance known for its well-preserved mangrove ecosystems. The country's largest Pacific island is Coiba, which forms the core of Coiba National Park, a UNESCO World Heritage Site.

== Harbors ==
The Caribbean coastline is marked by several good natural harbors. The numerous islands of the Archipiélago de Bocas del Toro, near the Beaches of Costa Rica, provide an extensive natural roadstead and shield the banana port of Almirante. The over 350 San Blas Islands, near Colombia, are strung out for more than 160 km (99 mi) along the sheltered Caribbean coastline.

The major port on the Pacific coastline is Balboa. The principal islands are those of the Archipiélago de las Perlas in the middle of the Gulf of Panama, the penal colony on the Isla de Coiba in the Golfo de Chiriquí, and the decorative island of Taboga, a tourist attraction that can be seen from Panama City. In all, there are some 1,000 islands off the Pacific coast.

The Pacific coastal waters are extraordinarily shallow. Depths of 180 metres (591 ft) are reached only outside the perimeters of both the Gulf of Panama and the Golfo de Chiriquí, and wide mud flats extend up to 70 km (43 mi) seaward from the coastlines. As a consequence, the tidal range is extreme. A variation of about 70 centimetres (2.3 ft) between high and low water on the Caribbean coast contrasts sharply with over 700 cm (23 ft) on the Pacific coast, and some 130 km (81 mi) up the Río Tuira, the tidal range is still over 500 cm (16 ft). A recent global remote sensing analysis suggested that there were 1,016 km^{2} of tidal flats in Panama, making it the 32nd ranked country in terms of tidal flat area.

== Waterways ==
Nearly 500 rivers lace Panama's rugged landscape. Mostly unnavigable, many originate as swift highland streams, meander in valleys, and form coastal deltas. The Río Chepo and the Río Chagres are sources of hydroelectric power. The Kampia lake and Madden Lake (also filled with water from the Río Chagres) provide hydroelectricity for the area of the former Canal Zone.

More than 300 rivers empty into the Pacific. These Pacific-oriented rivers are longer and slower running than those of the Caribbean side. Their basins are also more extensive. One of the longest is the Río Tuira which flows into the Golfo de San Miguel and is the nation's only river navigable by larger vessels.

== Administrative divisions ==
A map of Panama showing its ten provinces and five provincial-level comarcas indígenas (indigenous regions).

Panama is divided into 10 provinces, plus several indigenous comarcas. The provinces are divided into districts, which in turn are subdivided into sections called corregimientos. Configurations of the corregimientos are changed periodically to accommodate population changes as revealed in the census reports.

== General facts ==
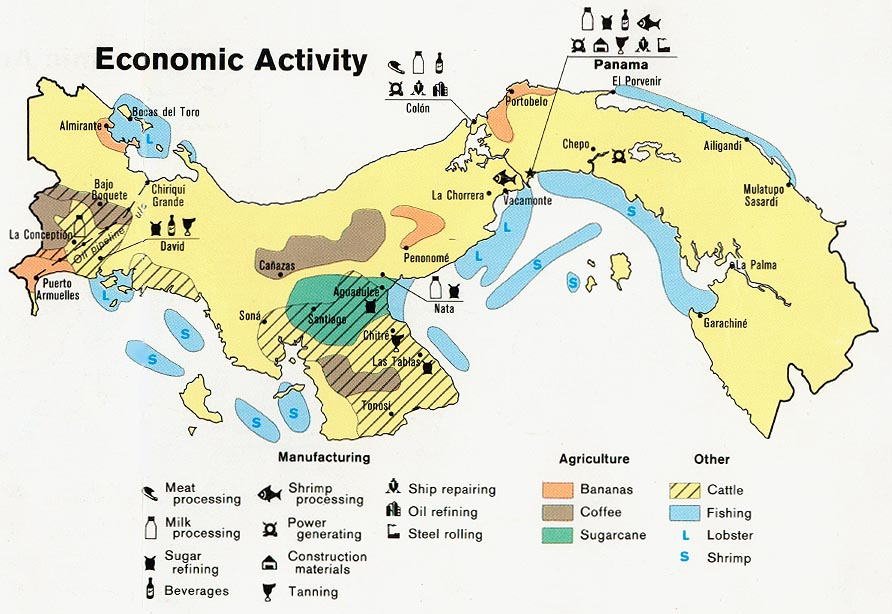
Economic activity in Panama, 1981

Geographic coordinates: 9°00′N 80°00′W

Map references: Northern South America, the Caribbean and sometimes Central America

Area:
total: 75,420 km^{2}
land: 74,340 km^{2}
water: 1,080 km^{2}

Land boundaries:
total: 555 km
border countries: Colombia 225 km, Costa Rica 330 km

Coastline: 2,490 km

Maritime claims:
territorial sea: 12 nautical miles (22 kilometres)
contiguous zone: 24 nautical miles (44 kilometres)
exclusive economic zone: 335,646 km^{2} (129,594 mi^{2}) and 200 nautical miles (370 kilometres) or edge of continental margin

Climate: tropical maritime; hot, humid, cloudy; prolonged rainy season (May to January), short dry season (January to May)

Terrain: interior mostly steep, rugged mountains and dissected, upland plains; coastal areas largely plains and rolling hills

Extreme points:

Northernmost point: Point Manzanillo

Southernmost point: Punta Mariato, Cerro Hoya National Park, Veraguas

Westernmost point: Border with Costa Rica, Chiriquí Province

Easternmost point: Border with Colombia, Darién Province
Lowest point: Pacific Ocean 0 m
Highest point: Volcan de Chiriqui 3,475 m

Natural resources: copper, mahogany forests, shrimp, hydropower

Land use:
arable land: 7.16%
permanent crops: 2.51%
other: 90.33% (2011)

Irrigated land: 346.2 km^{2} (2003)

Total renewable water resources: 148 km^{3} (2011)

Natural hazards: occasional severe storms and forest fires in the Darien area, earthquakes

Environment - current issues: water pollution from agricultural runoff threatens fishery resources; deforestation of tropical rain forest; land degradation and soil erosion threatens siltation of Panama Canal; air pollution in urban areas; mining threatens natural resources

Environment - international agreements:
party to: Biodiversity, Climate Change, Climate Change-Kyoto Protocol, Desertification, Endangered Species, Environmental Modification, Hazardous Wastes, Law of the Sea, Marine Dumping, Ozone Layer Protection, Ship Pollution, Tropical Timber 83, Tropical Timber 94, Wetlands, Whaling
signed, but not ratified: Marine Life Conservation

Geography - note: strategic location at eastern end of Central America; controls Panama Canal that links Atlantic Ocean via Caribbean Sea with Pacific Ocean. Central Panama has the unusual distinction of having the sun rise over the Pacific and set over the Atlantic.
