= Balsas River (Panama) =

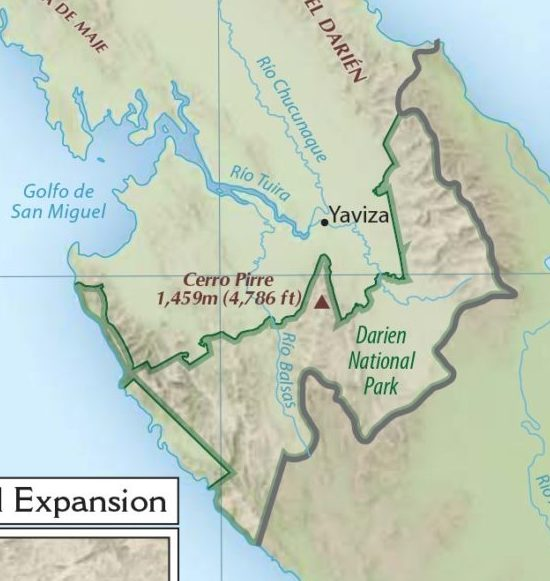
- Southeast Panama. Balsas River lower center

Location
- Country: Panama

Physical characteristics
- Mouth
  - location: Tuira River
  - coordinates: 8.2272°N 77.9745°W
- Length: 74 kilometres (46 mi)

The Balsas River (Spanish: Rio Balsas) or Rio Tucutí is a river of eastern Panama.

== Geography ==
The Balsas is a tributary of the Tuira (or Darien) river. It rises on the border with Colombia and flows north and then northeast to its confluence with the Tuira. Its headwaters flow through the Darién National Park. A 1903 report on Panama listed the Balsas as one of the more important rivers of the territory of Darien, then in Panamá Province. The report said that gold was obtained from the Balsas.

The Köppen climate classification is Tropical Savannah. The region has an average temperature of 27 °C (81 °F) and average precipitation of 2,000 millimetres (79 in) per year. Annual runoff is between 1,000 and 1,600 millimetres (39 and 63 in). It rains on about 150 days each year. The watershed of the Balsas covers 1,950 square kilometres (750 sq mi). Average flow at its mouth is 173 cubic metres per second (6,100 cu ft/s). The waters of the Balsa River are more turbid than the waters of the Tuira River, indicating greater amounts of erosion in the Balsa basin. The mouth of the Balsas River has several islets formed by sediment, some with growth of herbaceous vegetation.

== Ecology ==
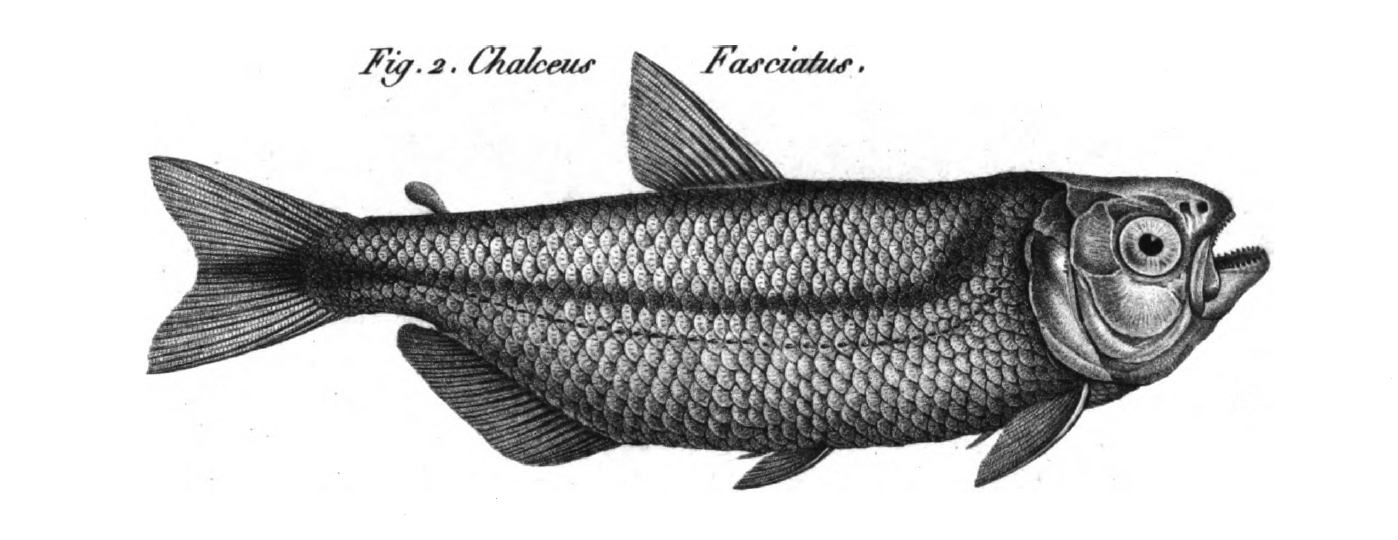
Astyanax fasciatus by Cuvier (1819)

The river is also called Rio de balsas, after the balsa trees (Ochroma lagopus) that were found along its bank. Balsa wood is very light, and is used for rafts. In Spanish, balsa means "raft".

A 1997 study of the middle basin of the river found 40 species of fish in 38 genera and 17 families. The most common species were Roeboides occidentalis, Astyanax fasciatus, Aequidens coeruleopunctatus, Gephyrocharax atracaudata and Creagrutus affinis. 11 species were endemic.

== European exploration ==
In 1520 Gil González Dávila opened a road 14 leagues (68 km) long from Acla on the Caribbean coast through the mountains to the Balsas River, where he built four ships for use in exploring the Pacific coast of Central America. (Note: Presumably González Dávila reached the section below the convergence of the Balsas and Tuira rivers, which is shown on some maps as the Rio Balsas and flows into the Bay of San Miguel.) Due to poor construction, these boats sank when they reached the Pearl Islands in the Gulf of Panama. González built four more ships there, and set sail on 21 January 1522.

In 1572 Captain Esteban de Trejo led an expedition to subdue runaway African slaves, and discovered several Indian towns in the process. He called the inhabitants Churruca Indians after the river than flowed past their towns. 12 leagues (58 km) to the east of the seat of Churruca, beside the Balsas river, he found about 300 Calegra Indians. They spoke a different language from the Churrucas and prided themselves as being very warlike.

== See also ==
- List of rivers of Panama

== Sources ==
- Eladio Almengor, Francisco Ponce (April 2008), COMPLEJO HIDROELECTRICO RIO TUIRA (PDF) (in Spanish)
- Fernández Guardia, Ricardo (1913), History of the discovery and conquest of Costa Rica, translated by Harry Weston Van Dyke, New York: T.Y. Crowell Co.
- Garcés B., Humberto A.; Garcia R., Jorge (2007), "inventario ictiológico en la cuenca del río balsas, parque nacional darién, panamá", Tecnociencia (in Spanish), 9 (2): 45–57
- Hale, Harry C (1903), Notes on Panama (PDF), Washington: United States. War Dept. General Staff. Military Information Division
- Mena García, María del Carmen (1984), La sociedad de Panamá en el siglo XVI (in Spanish), Seville, ISBN 9788450096996
- "Relation: Río Balsas (13209565)", OpenStreetMap
- Ringrose, Basil (1992), A Buccaneer's Atlas: Basil Ringrose's South Sea Waggoner : a Sea Atlas and Sailing Directions of the Pacific Coast of the Americas, 1682, University of California Press, ISBN 9780520054103
