= John Oxenham =

English explorer (died 1580)

John Oxenham (–30 September 1580), also known as John Oxnam, was the first non-Spanish European explorer to cross the Isthmus of Panama in 1575, climbing the coastal cordillera to get to the Pacific Ocean, then referred to by the Spanish as the Mar del Sur (South Seas).

Departing from Acla (in modern Darién Province), he descended to the Chucunaque River, which Vasco Núñez de Balboa had also used in 1513 to cross the isthmus, first following the coast to the town of Careta, then receiving assistance from the Cimarrones for the crossing itself.

== Voyages to the New World ==
=== First expedition ===
In May 1572, John Oxenham joined Francis Drake's expedition to Central America, along with Drake's brothers John and Joseph (both of whom died on the voyage). They left Plymouth with a total of 73 men in the Pasha (70 tons) and Swanet (25 tons), set up an operating base in a creek in the Isthmus of Panama, and raided the Isle of Pines, Cartagena, and Nombre de Dios to divert the attention of the Spanish. With the help of the Cimarrones, they set an ambush on the route for transporting silver across Panama and captured a mule train that was passing during the night. The small guard fled, and Drake sailed back to Plymouth in August 1573 with a significant treasure.

=== Second expedition ===
After participating in Drake's successful voyage, Oxenham launched his own expedition to Panama, leaving Plymouth on 9 April 1576 with an 11-gun frigate (100–140 tons, name unknown) and 57 men, and after taking some prizes and prisoners, hid his ship and prizes and proceeded on the Panama mainland. The Cimarrones guided Oxenham and his men across the Cordillera de San Blas to the head of the Chucunaque River, which flows into the Pacific Ocean. During the winter, Oxenham's men and their Cimarron allies felled and milled cedar trees to build a shallow-draft 45 foot, oared boat, that they then floated down the river and into the ocean, making Oxenham the first Englishman to build a vessel in the New World; he wasn't the first to sail in the Pacific as Magellan's master gunner was an Englishman.

The Spanish were taken completely by surprise, not expecting an enemy vessel in Pacific waters, and Oxenham's crew was able to capture two unguarded barques with 160,000 pesetas of silver and gold along with other supplies. However, the Spanish eventually pursued Oxenham up the Tuira River, where trash discarded by Oxenham's men and floating down the river gave them away. Oxenham buried the treasure, but the Spanish eventually recovered most of it. Oxenham was wounded in the Spanish attack, but managed to escape with a few crew members and survive several months on the run, until the Spanish captured him, and 17 others, who were taken to Panama in 1578; three boys were spared and 12 others were hanged. He was executed by hanging at Lima on 30 September 1580, along with John Butler and Thomas Sherwell, while his former commander, Francis Drake, was himself in the Pacific on his famous raids in the Golden Hind.
