= Pinogana =

Coordinates: 8.1172°N 77.6843°W

- Corregimiento
- Location within Panama
- Country: Panama
- Province: Darién
- District: Pinogana

Area
  - Land: 42.9 km^{2} (16.6 sq mi)

Population (2010)
  - Total: 405
  - Density: 9.4/km^{2} (24/sq mi)
- Population density calculated based on land area.
- Time zone: UTC−5 (EST)
- Climate: Am

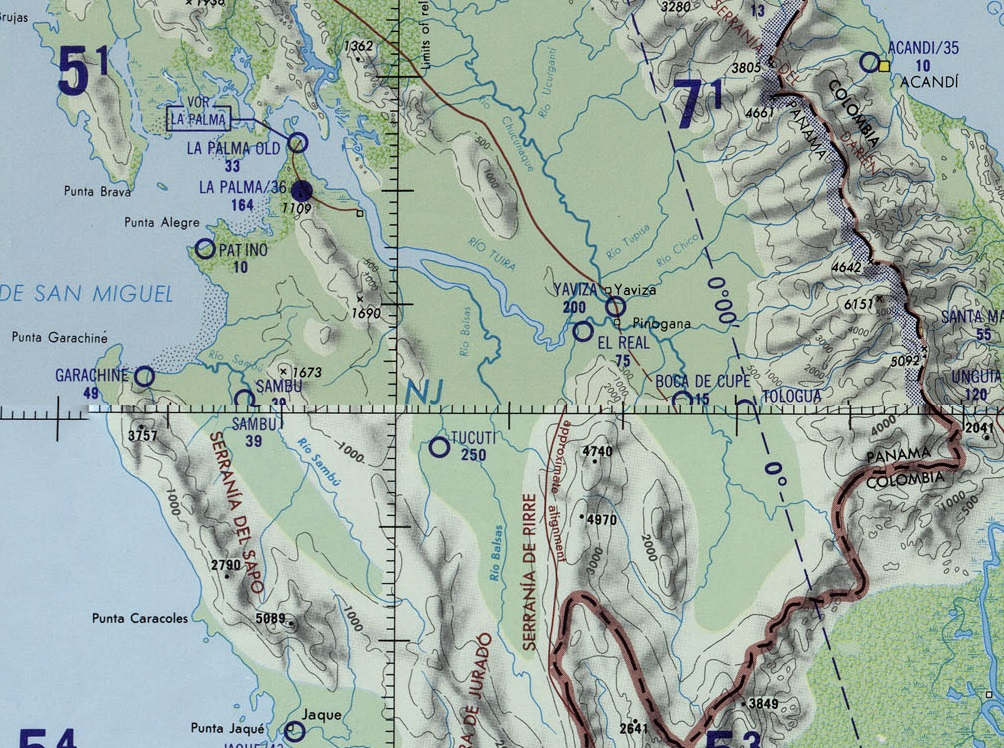
U.S. Defense Mapping Agency maps excerpt showing Pinogana along course of Tuira River.

Pinogana is a corregimiento in Pinogana District, Darién Province, Panama with a population of 405 as of 2010. Its population as of 1990 was 489; its population as of 2000 was 356. It is located along the Tuira River.

== Transportation ==
In 2021, the Panamanian Ministry of Public Works started a project to connect the community by road to Yaviza. As of late 2025, a bridge had been constructed over the Chucunaque River, and paving was in progress.

If the road is completed, this will be the first community connected to the North American road network since Whatì, Northwest Territories in 2021.
