= Matuganti =

Coordinates: 7.81424°N 77.51569°W

Matugantí
- Village
- Location within Panama
- Country: Panama
- Province: Darién
- Time zone: UTC−5 (EST)
- Climate: Am

Matugantí is an Embera village in Darién Province, Panama. Far from any roads, it is located along the upper reaches of the Tuira River, close to the Colombia–Panama border.
