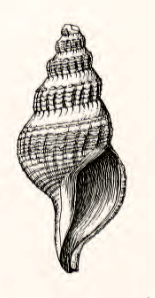
- Original image of a shell of Pleurotomella orariana

Scientific classification
- Kingdom: Animalia
- Phylum: Mollusca
- Class: Gastropoda
- Subclass: Caenogastropoda
- Order: Neogastropoda
- Superfamily: Conoidea
- Family: Raphitomidae
- Genus: Pleurotomella
- Species: P. orariana

Binomial name
- Pleurotomella orariana (Dall, 1908)

Synonyms
- Clathurella orariana Dall, 1908; Pleurotomella oceanida Dall, 1919 (objective synonym (same holotype))

= Pleurotomella orariana =

Species of sea snail

Pleurotomella orariana is a species of sea snail, a marine gastropod mollusk in the family Raphitomidae.

== Description ==
The length of the shell attains 12 mm, its diameter 5 mm.

(Original description) The small shell is fusiform. It is white or pale yellowish on a dull surface. Its protoconch is eroded and is followed by about six subsequent whorls. The suture is distinct, not appressed. The whorls are rounded. The anal fasciole is smooth except for minute arcuate, elevated, more or less distant axial lines, and the intervening incremental lines. The whorl in front of the fasciole is axially sculptured with (on the body whorl about twenty-six) moderately strong, equal, rounded, somewhat protractive ribs with subequal interspaces. The ribs extend from the shoulder to the suture or, on the body whorl, to the base, where they become obsolete. These ribs are crossed on the spire by about six prominent spiral threads, subequal and with wider interspaces, often with a more minute intercalary thread, the primaries somewhat swollen on the summits of the ribs. On the body whorl the same sculpture extends over the whorl and upon the siphonal canal. The outer lip is thin, broadly arcuate, simple, with a rounded, shallow, anal sulcus close to the suture. The body shows a thin wash of callus, white and smooth. The columella is straight, rapidly attenuated in front with a pervious axis. The siphonal canal is wide, slightly recurved.

== Distribution ==
This marine species occurs in the Gulf of Panama.
