= El Real Airport =

El Real de Santa María Airport
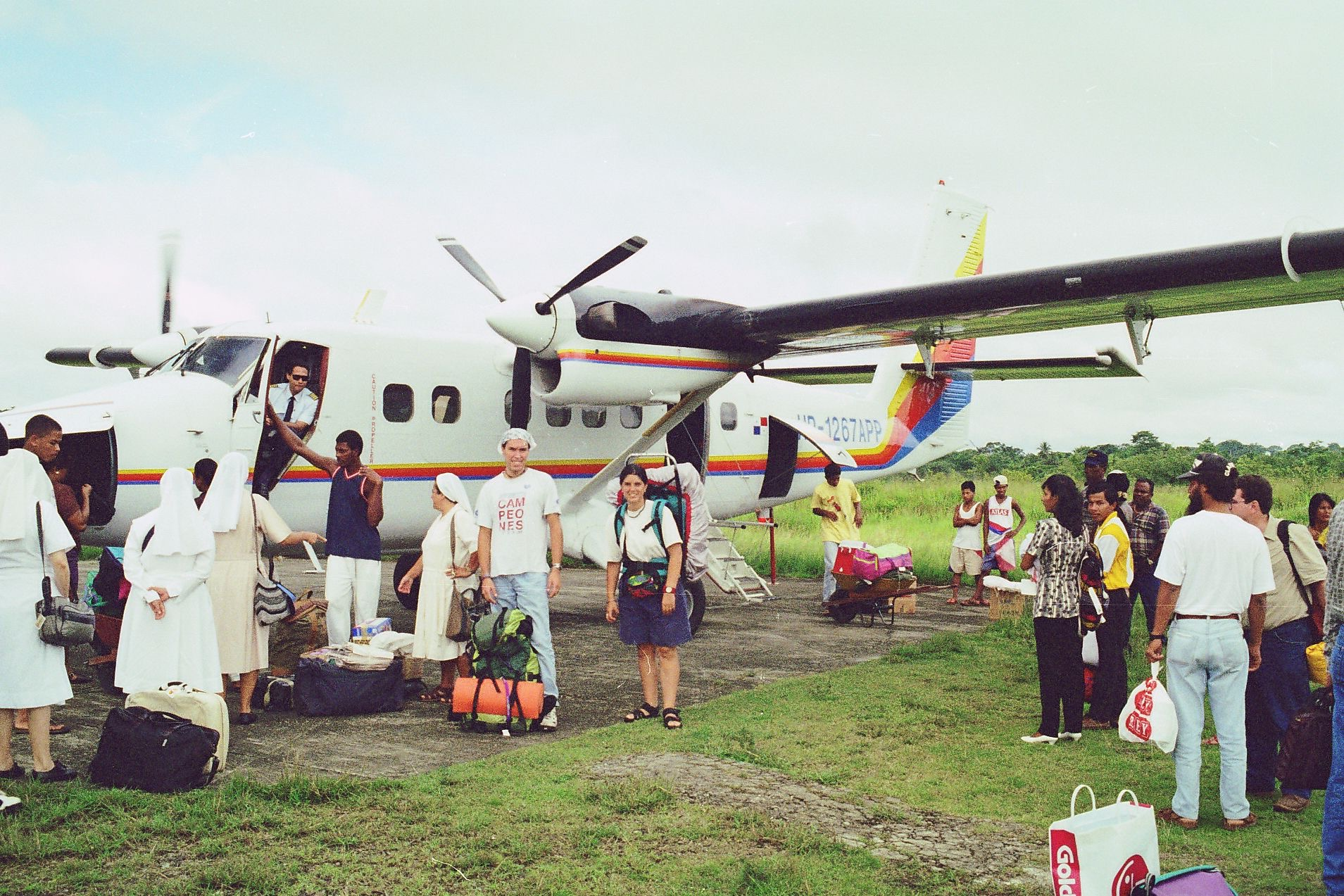
- Unloading goods at El Real Airport, 1996
- IATA: ELE; ICAO: none

Summary
- Serves: El Real de Santa María, Panama
- Elevation AMSL: 57 ft / 17 m
- Coordinates: 8°06′25″N 77°43′35″W

Map
- Location of the airport in Panama

Runways
Direction	Length		Surface
Direction	m	ft	Surface
11/29	570	1,870	Asphalt
- Source: HERE Maps GCM

El Real de Santa María Airport (IATA: ELE) is an airstrip serving the small town of El Real de Santa María, in the Darién Province of Panama. El Real is 6.5 kilometres (4.0 mi) southwest of Yaviza, the southern end of the North American section of the Pan American Highway. There are no paved roads between the two towns.

The La Palma VOR-DME (Ident: PML) is located 30.5 nautical miles (56.5 km) northwest of the runway.

== See also ==
- Transport in Panama
- List of airports in Panama
