= Boca de Cupe =

Coordinates: 8.0500°N 77.5833°W

Boca de Cupé
- Corregimiento
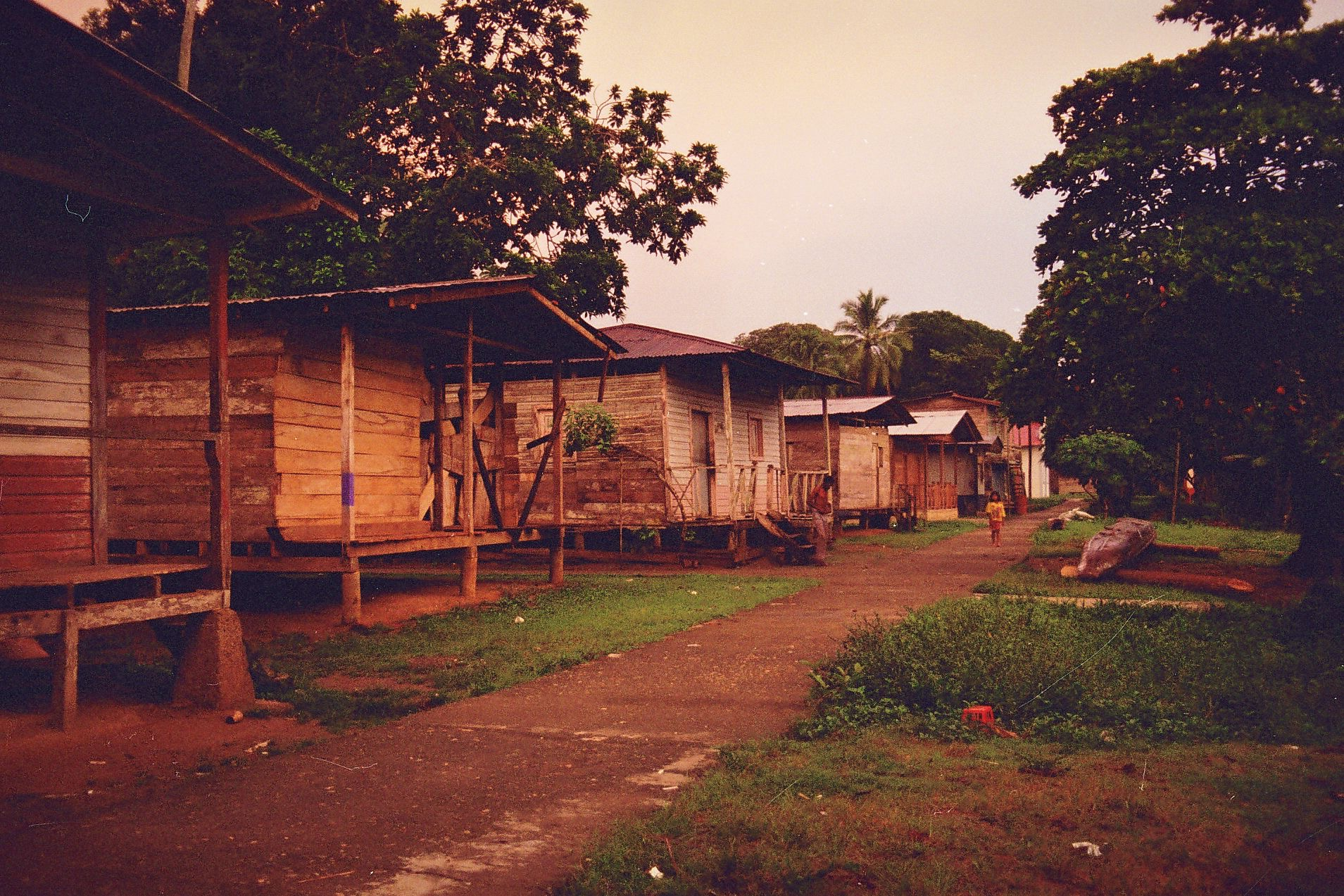
- Main "street" at the village of Boca de Cupe in 1996

- Location within Panama
- Country: Panama
- Province: Darién
- District: Pinogana

Area
  - Land: 781.1 km^{2} (301.6 sq mi)

Population (2010)
  - Total: 1,167
  - Density: 1.5/km^{2} (3.9/sq mi)
- Population density calculated based on land area.
- Time zone: UTC−5 (EST)
- Climate: Am

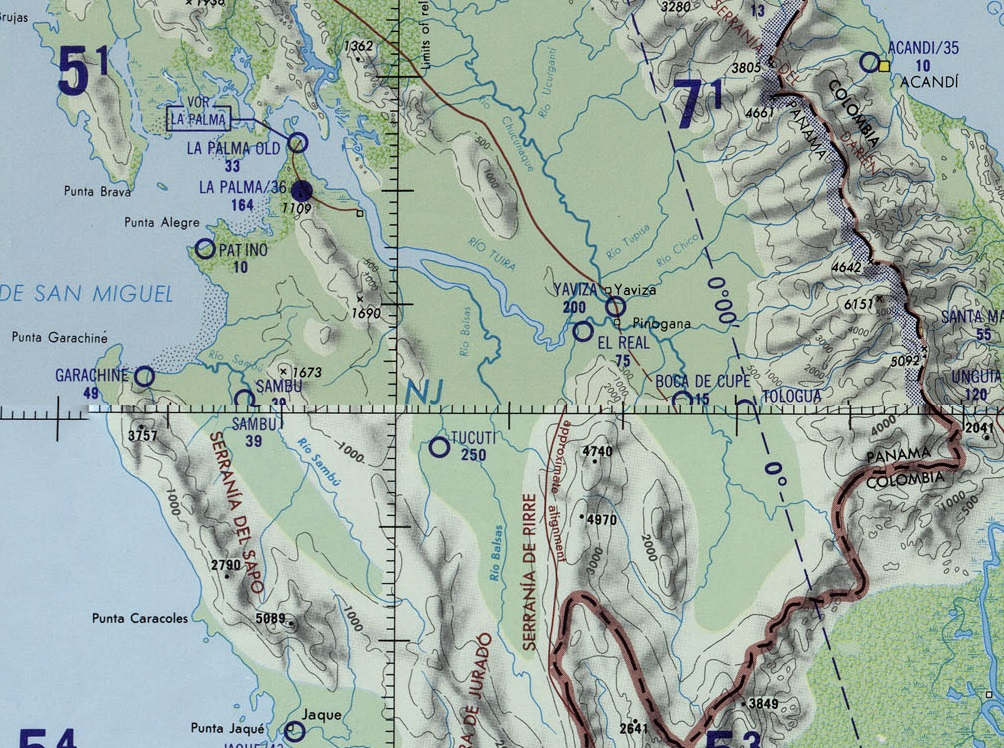
U.S. Defense Mapping Agency maps excerpt showing Boca de Cupe along course of Tuira River.

Boca de Cupé is a corregimiento in Pinogana District, Darién Province, Panama with a population of 1,167 as of 2010. Its population as of 1990 was 901; its population as of 2000 was 902.

The town is not served by any paved roads, with the Pan-American Highway to the north ending at Yaviza. It is reachable by boat up the Tuira River. Civilians are not permitted to travel further east towards Colombia.

In the early 1900s, a single-gauge railway ran to the town from the Cana gold mines. It ceased operating in 1911.

Villages within the corregimiento further up the river include Sobiaquirú.
