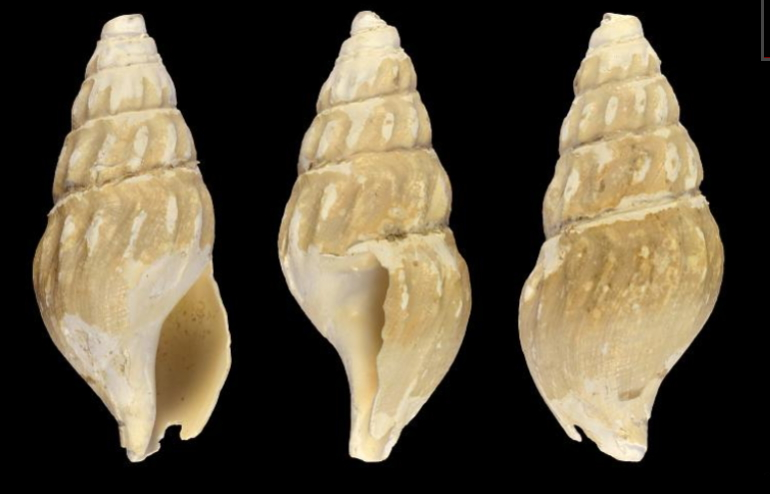
- Shell of Leucosyrinx esilda (holotype at the Smithsonian Institution)

Scientific classification
- Kingdom: Animalia
- Phylum: Mollusca
- Class: Gastropoda
- Subclass: Caenogastropoda
- Order: Neogastropoda
- Superfamily: Conoidea
- Family: Pseudomelatomidae
- Genus: Leucosyrinx
- Species: L. esilda

Binomial name
- Leucosyrinx esilda (Dall, 1908)

Synonyms
- Pleurotomella esilda Dall, 1908; Pleurotomella (Pleurotomella) esilda Dall, 1908

= Leucosyrinx esilda =

Species of gastropod

Leucosyrinx esilda is a species of sea snail, a marine gastropod mollusk in the family Pseudomelatomidae, the turrids and allies.

== Description ==
The length of the shell attains 24 mm, its diameter 9.7 mm.

(Original description) The shell is fusiform with the spire longer than the aperture. It is chalky, apically eroded, with a pale gray, very thin periostracum and about five remaining whorls. The suture is appressed with a slightly constricted anal fasciole in front of it. About sixteen subequal, low, rounded protective ribs cross the upper whorls from in front of the fasciole with subequal interspaces and, on the body whorl, cease rather abruptly near the periphery. These ribs are not particularly strong or abrupt at their beginning. The spiral sculpture consists of six or eight faintly incised lines in front of the suture and on the fasciole, and beginning again on the base near the anterior ends of the ribs and continuous but not sharp over the base and siphonal canal. The band between the two series includes the ribbed part of the whorl and is sculptured with irregular, more or less retractive, oblique, vermicular, more or less punctate markings which override ribs and intervals with about the same strength as the spirals. The whorls are moderately rounded, spire subacute. The anal sulcus is wide and shallow. The outer lip is thin and simple. The body contains a wash of callus extending also over the short, straight, obliquely truncate, slightly twisted columella. The siphonal canal is short and wide.

== Discussion ==
The species is based on a single, heavily broken, dead-collected shell (22.8 mm in shell length). It differs significantly from species of Leucosyrinx, exhibiting a very short siphonal canal, strong and long axial ribs extending to the poorly defined subsutural ramp, and an anal sinus situated close to the shoulder. On these grounds we are currently unable to determine its exact generic position.

== Distribution ==
This marine species occurs in the Gulf of Panama at depth of 1335 m.
