= Guna de Wargandí =

Coordinates: 8.857°N 77.978°W

Comarca Guna de Wargandí
- Comarca indígena and corregimiento
- Country: Panama
- Province: Darién
- District: Pinogana
- Established: July 25, 2000

Area
  - Land: 956.4 km^{2} (369.3 sq mi)

Population (2010)
  - Total: 1,914
  - Density: 2/km^{2} (5.2/sq mi)
- Population density calculated based on land area.
- Time zone: UTC−5 (EST)

Guna de Wargandí or Wargandí, formerly known as Kuna de Wargandí (Spanish pronunciation: [ˈkuna ðe waɾˈɣandi]) is a comarca indígena (indigenous territory) and corregimiento in Pinogana District, Darién Province, Panama with a population of 1,914 as of 2010. It was created by Law 34 of July 25, 2000, from the province of Darién, from the district of Pinogana. It has an area of 775 square kilometres (299 sq mi). It is inhabited by the Guna people.

== Geography ==
As Wargandí is a sub-provincial comarca (equivalent to a district rather than a province), it is not subdivided into districts, although it is subdivided into three communities, Mortí, Nurra and Wala. It is located in the Chucunaque River basin. It is a part of the Pinogana District of the Darien Province.

The community of Nurra serves as its de facto capital. It has no de jure capital.
