= Santa Cruz de Cana =

Coordinates: 7.783333°N 77.700000°W

- Former populated place/gold mine
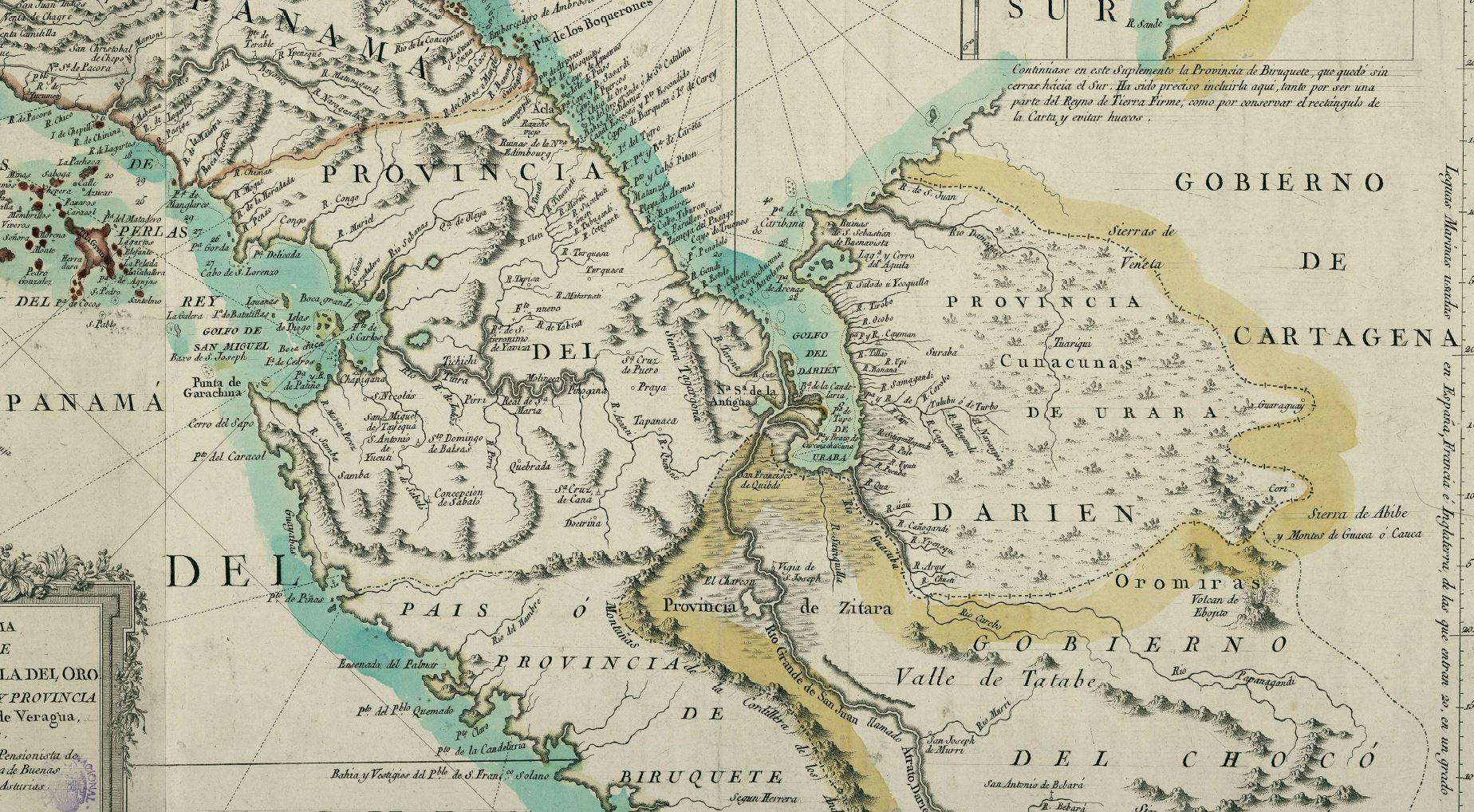
- 1785 map excerpt of Darién Province includes location of "Sa. Cruz de Cana"

- Location within Panama
- Country: Panama
- Province: Darién
- Time zone: UTC−5 (EST)
- Climate: Am

Santa Cruz de Cana, popularly called Cana today, is the site of a former gold mine, and fort and village, founded by Spaniards, located in Darién Province, Panama. Now located within Darién National Park, the site is best known today for bird-watching.

== History ==
The Spaniards were engaged in very active mining activity at Cana (the mine being called "Espíritu Santo de Cana") during the mid-17th century—with reports that mining began in 1665—and it was the most important gold mine in Panama. The mine was subject to raids by English pirates a number of times in the early 1700s. Nathaniel Davis wrote that at the time of the 1702 raid, the town had around 900 houses and a church. The mine was abandoned after a shaft collapse that killed two miners in 1727, in addition to attacks from pirate and Indigenous peoples. The site became uninhabited by the mid-19th century

Attempts to resume mining returned in the late 1800s. In the early 1900s, a single-gage railway ran from the mines to the town of Boca de Cupe, where the Tuira River was navigable, to support renewed mining activity. It ceased operating in 1911. The rail course is now a "mine trail" between the two locations.

== Today ==
Now located within Darién National Park, it is known for bird-watching, despite its very remote location.
