= Sobiaquirú =

Coordinates: 7.89957°N 77.52876°W

- Village
- Location within Panama
- Country: Panama
- Province: Darién
- Time zone: UTC−5 (EST)
- Climate: Am

Sobiaquirú ("Good Heart" in the local Emberá dialect) is an Embera village in Darién Province, Panama. It is located along the Tuira River upstream of the village of Boca de Cupe, and within the corregimiento of that same name. It is not served by any paved roads. It is about a nine hour boat ride from Yaviza.

A 2007 news report stated that the village had 243 residents.
