= Metetí =

- Corregimiento and town
- Location within Panama
- Coordinates: 8°30′0″N 77°58′12″W
- Country: Panama
- Province: Darién
- District: Pinogana
- Established: July 29, 1998

Area
  - Land: 869.5 km^{2} (335.7 sq mi)

Population (2010)
  - Total: 7,976
  - Density: 9.2/km^{2} (24/sq mi)
- Population density calculated based on land area.
- Time zone: UTC−5 (EST)
- Climate: Aw

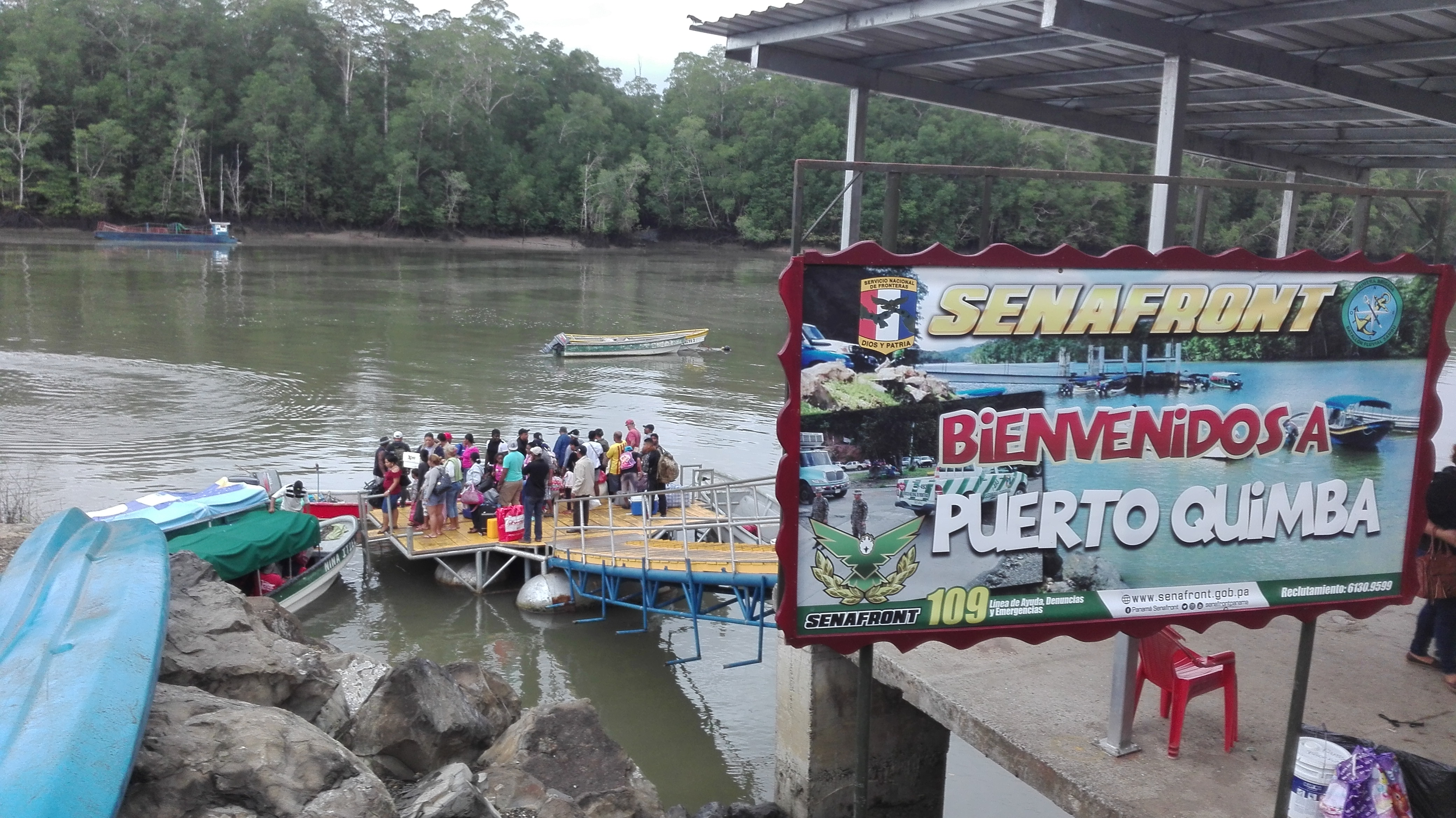
Puerto Quimba, Metetí, Darién

Metetí is a town and corregimiento in Pinogana District, Darién Province, Panama with a population of 7,976 as of 2010. It was created by Law 58 of July 29, 1998, owing to the Declaration of Unconstitutionality of Law 1 of 1982. Its population as of 2000 was 6,244. It is the last major town on the Inter-American Highway before the highway ends at Yaviza. Most of the town's residents are originally from Chiriquí Province. The town has a bank with an ATM, a few restaurants and hotels, a police station, and a gas station.
