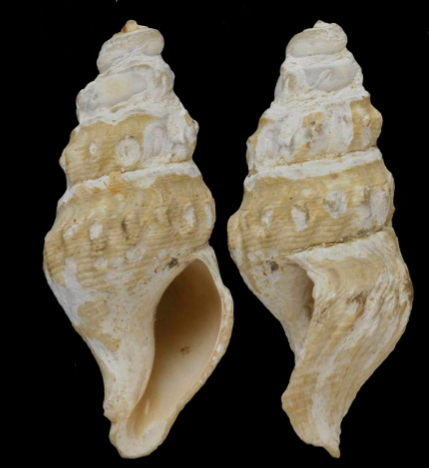
- Shell of Leucosyrinx herilda (holotype at the Smithsonian Instiotution)

Scientific classification
- Kingdom: Animalia
- Phylum: Mollusca
- Class: Gastropoda
- Subclass: Caenogastropoda
- Order: Neogastropoda
- Superfamily: Conoidea
- Family: Pseudomelatomidae
- Genus: Leucosyrinx
- Species: L. herilda

Binomial name
- Leucosyrinx herilda (Dall, 1908)

Synonyms
- Gemmula herilda Dall, 1908 (original combination)

= Leucosyrinx herilda =

Species of gastropod

Leucosyrinx herilda is a species of sea snail, a marine gastropod mollusk in the family Pseudomelatomidae, the turrids and allies.

== Description ==
The length of the shell attains 18 mm, its diameter 7 mm.

(Original description) The shell is rather small, stout, solid and chalky under an olivaceous periostracum. The spire is longer than the aperture. The shell contains at least eight whorls in the adult but usually much eroded. The summit of the spire is apparently blunt. the whorls in the young are short in their axial dimension, giving a " chunky " aspect to the shell. The earlyTwhorls contain two beaded spiral series or cordons one at the posterior suture, and another, larger, near the anterior suture. Between them is the anal fasciole. As the shell grows the anterior beaded cordon becomes situated more near the centre of the exposed whorl and (on the fourth whorl about twenty) the nodulations represent the posterior terminations of narrow very protractive axial riblets, which on the fifth whorl fade out on the base. The anal fasciole is conspicuously marked with arcuate, close, fine ripples. In front of the shoulder in the young the whole base of the shell and siphonal canal are covered with close, fine, spiral threads, which as the shell grows older appear also on the anal fasciole. In the older shells, the nodular band next the suture and that at the periphery become less prominently sculptured and the ribs almost obsolete. The aperture and the siphonal canal are short and wide. The columella shows a little callus, straight, solid. The outer lip is produced, thin, sharp and simple. The anal sulcus is wide, shallow, in the older shells nearly reaching the suture.

The species is very similar to Leucosyrinx powelli (Rehder & Ladd, 1973) collected at Agassiz Guyot in the central Pacific albeit at shallower depths (1581–1617 m). Both species can be conspecific, but due to the large distance between the type localities and large difference in depths, they are presently considered as two separate species.

== Distribution ==
This marine species occurs in the Gulf of Panama at a depth of 3057 m.
