= Paya, Darién =

Coordinates: 7.9667°N 77.4000°W

Paya
- Corregimiento
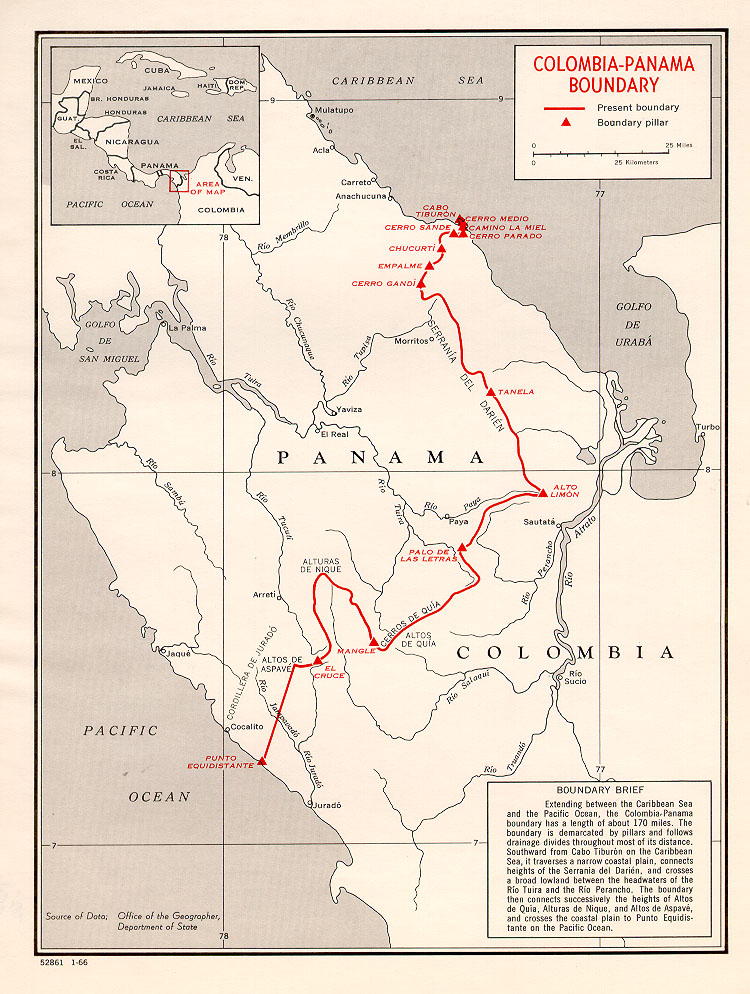
- 1960 US map of Colombia-Panama boundary shows the location of the village of Paya

- Location within Panama
- Country: Panama
- Province: Darién
- District: Pinogana

Area
  - Land: 1,111.1 km^{2} (429.0 sq mi)

Population (2010)
  - Total: 639
  - Density: 0.6/km^{2} (1.6/sq mi)
- Population density calculated based on land area.
- Time zone: UTC−5 (EST)
- Climate: Am

Paya is a corregimiento in Pinogana District, Darién Province, Panama with a population of 639 as of 2010. Its population as of 1990 was 336; its population as of 2000 was 565. It lies on the Paya River, a tributary of the Tuira River, and close to the Colombia–Panama border.
