= Mortí =

- Location within Panama
- Coordinates: 8°51′0″N 77°55′12″W
- Country: Panama
- Province: Kuna de Wargandí

Population (2008)
  - Total: 589

Mortí is a town in the Kuna de Wargandí province of Panama.

== Sources ==
- World Gazetteer: Panama – World-Gazetteer.com
