= Yape =

Coordinates: 8.1006°N 77.5964°W

- Corregimiento
- Location within Panama
- Country: Panama
- Province: Darién
- District: Pinogana

Area
  - Land: 544.8 km^{2} (210.3 sq mi)

Population (2010)
  - Total: 187
  - Density: 0.3/km^{2} (0.78/sq mi)
- Population density calculated based on land area.
- Time zone: UTC−5 (EST)
- Climate: Am

Yape is a corregimiento in Pinogana District, Darién Province, Panama with a population of 187 as of 2010. Its population as of 1990 was 229; its population as of 2000 was 159. It is located along the Tuira River, and not served by any paved roads.
