= Darién National Park =

UNESCO World Heritage Site

- IUCN category II (national park)
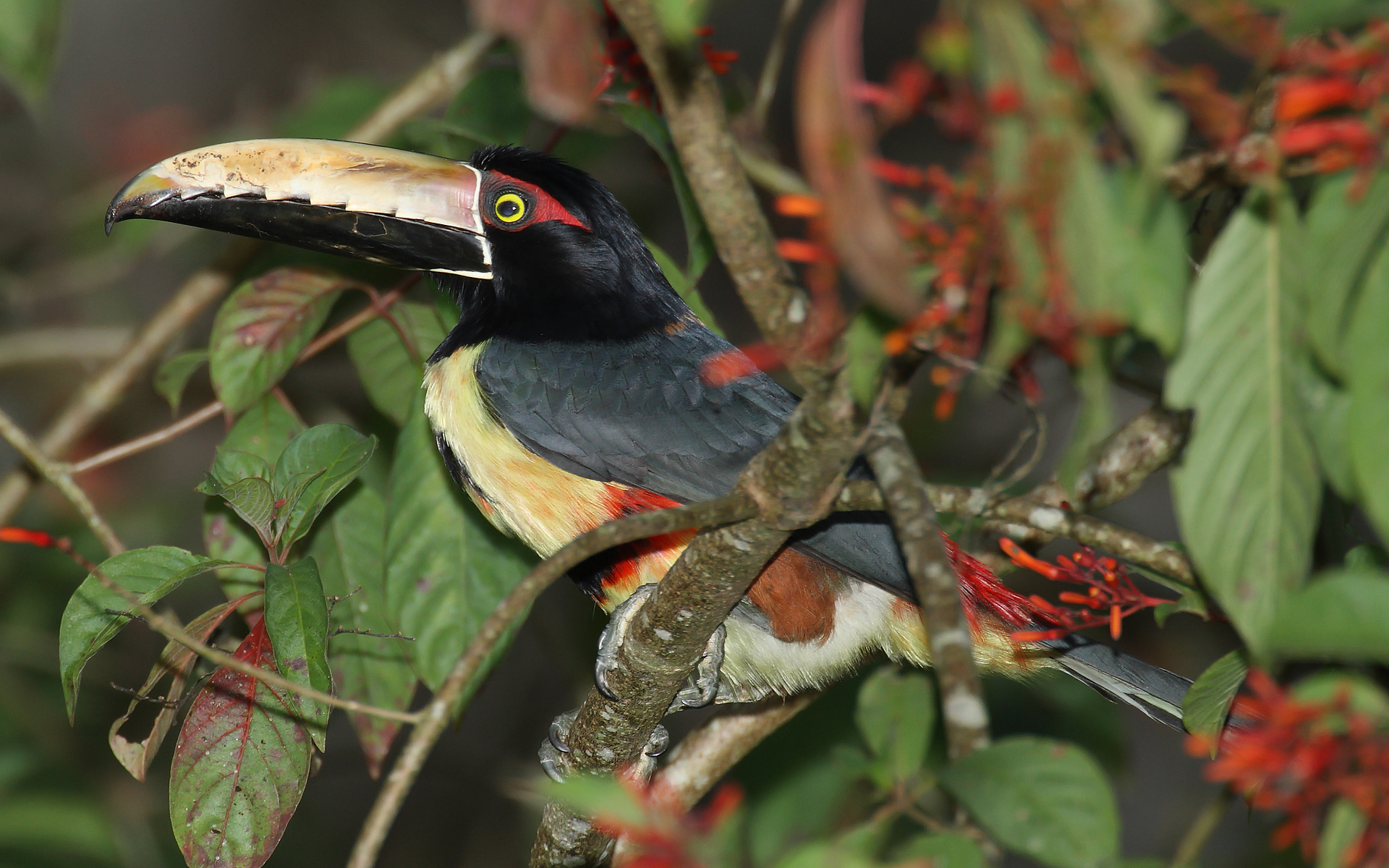
- Collared aracari at Darién National Park

- Location within Panama
- Location: Darién Province, Panama
- Coordinates: 7°44′10″N 77°32′50″W
- Area: 5,790 km^{2} (2,240 mi^{2})
- Established: 27 September 1980

UNESCO World Heritage Site
- Official name: Darien National Park
- Type: Natural
- Criteria: vii, ix, x
- Designated: 1981 (5th session)
- Reference no.: 159
- Region: Latin America and the Caribbean

Darién National Park (Spanish: Parque Nacional Darién) is a World Heritage Site in Panama. It is about 325 kilometers (202 mi) from Panama City, is the most extensive of all national parks of Panama, and is one of the most important World Heritage Sites in Central America.

== Geography ==
The Darién National Park is a natural bridge spanning North and South America. It is located in southernmost Panama in Darién province and its southern boundary extends along 90 percent of the Colombia–Panama border. It lies between the Serranía del Darién range, which parallels the Caribbean Sea 16 kilometers (9.9 mi) to the north-east, and the Pacific Ocean coast. It is adjacent to the Los Katíos National Park in Colombia.

In 1972, an area of 700,000 hectares (1,700,000 acres) became part of the Alto Darién Protection Forest. In 1980, the area was declared a national park. In 1983, an area of 859,333 hectares (2,123,460 acres) became a UNESCO biosphere reserve. The park covers 5,790 km^{2} (2,240 mi^{2}).

== Environment ==
The Darien National Park has myriad habitats, ranging from rocky coastlines to sandy beaches to mangroves. The park also has expansive swamps and large areas of tropical forests. It is rich in biodiversity and contains numerous threatened species. It has been designated an Important Bird Area (IBA) by BirdLife International.

=== Indigenous inhabitants ===
The park is one of the few examples remaining in the world of a protected area inhabited by humans. Two native tribes dwell in the park.

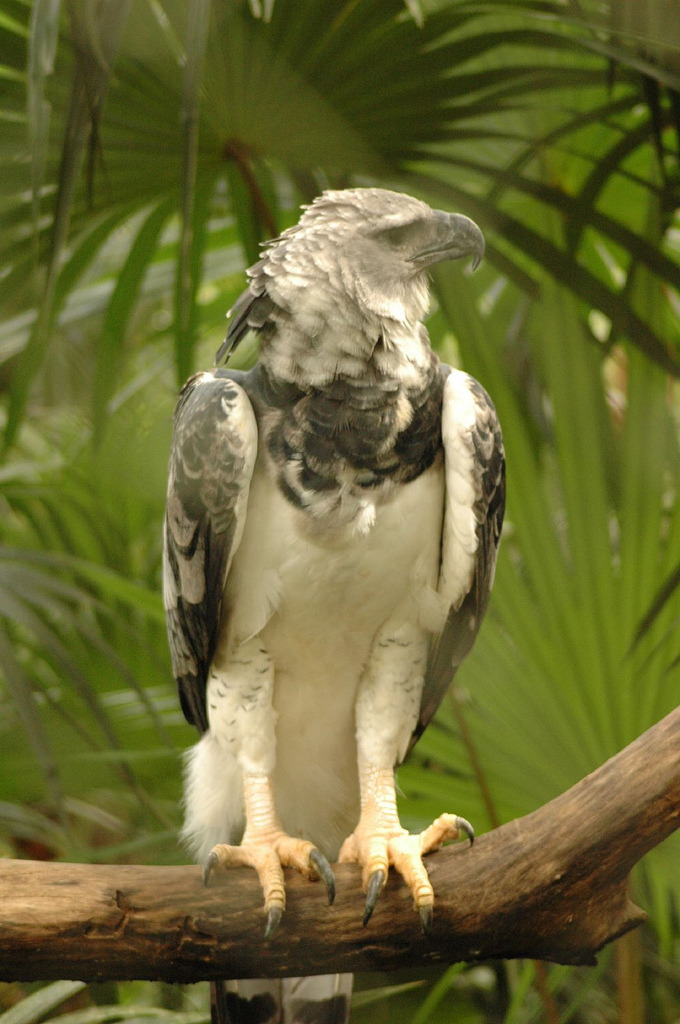
Harpy eagle

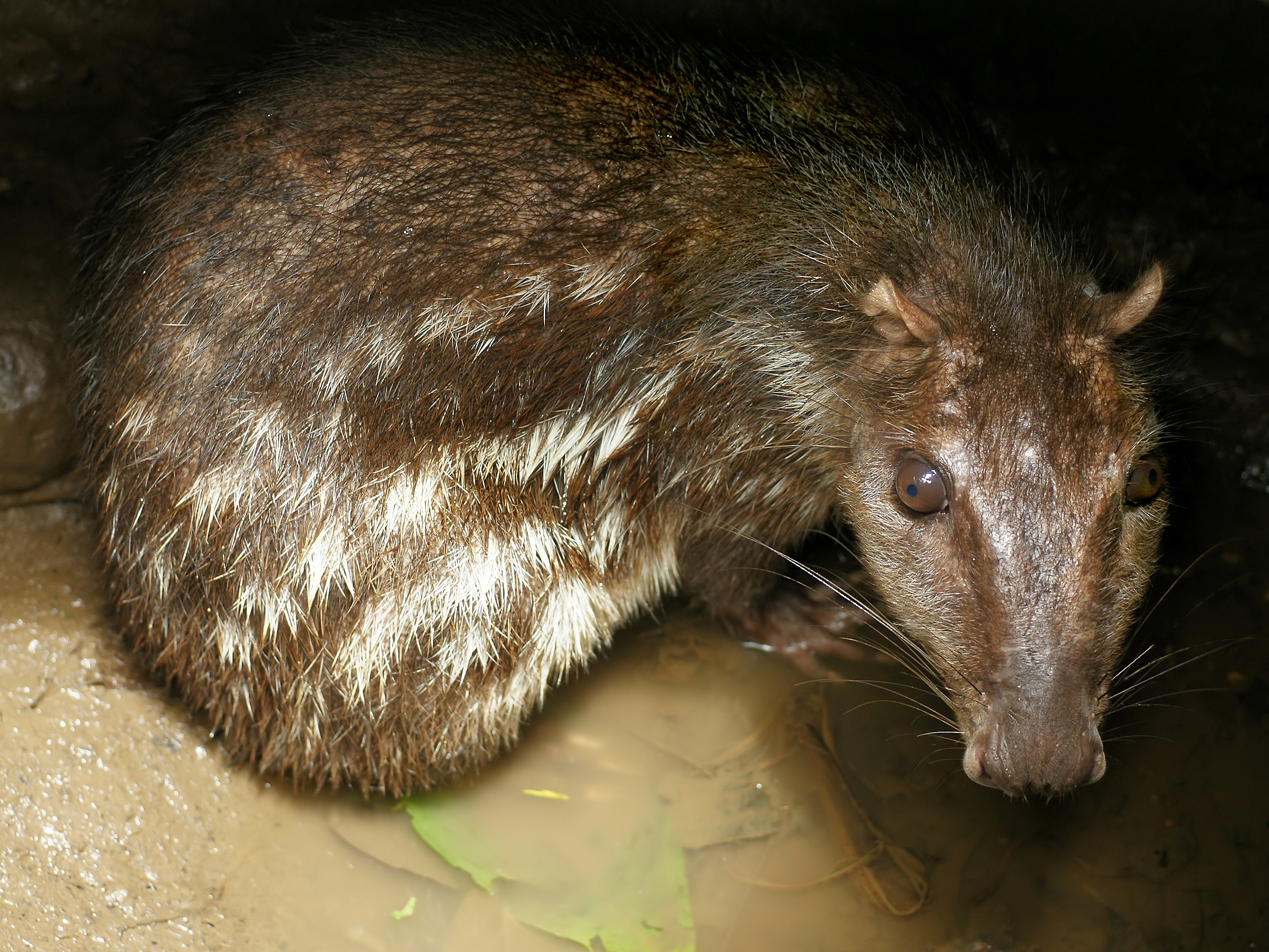
Spotted paca

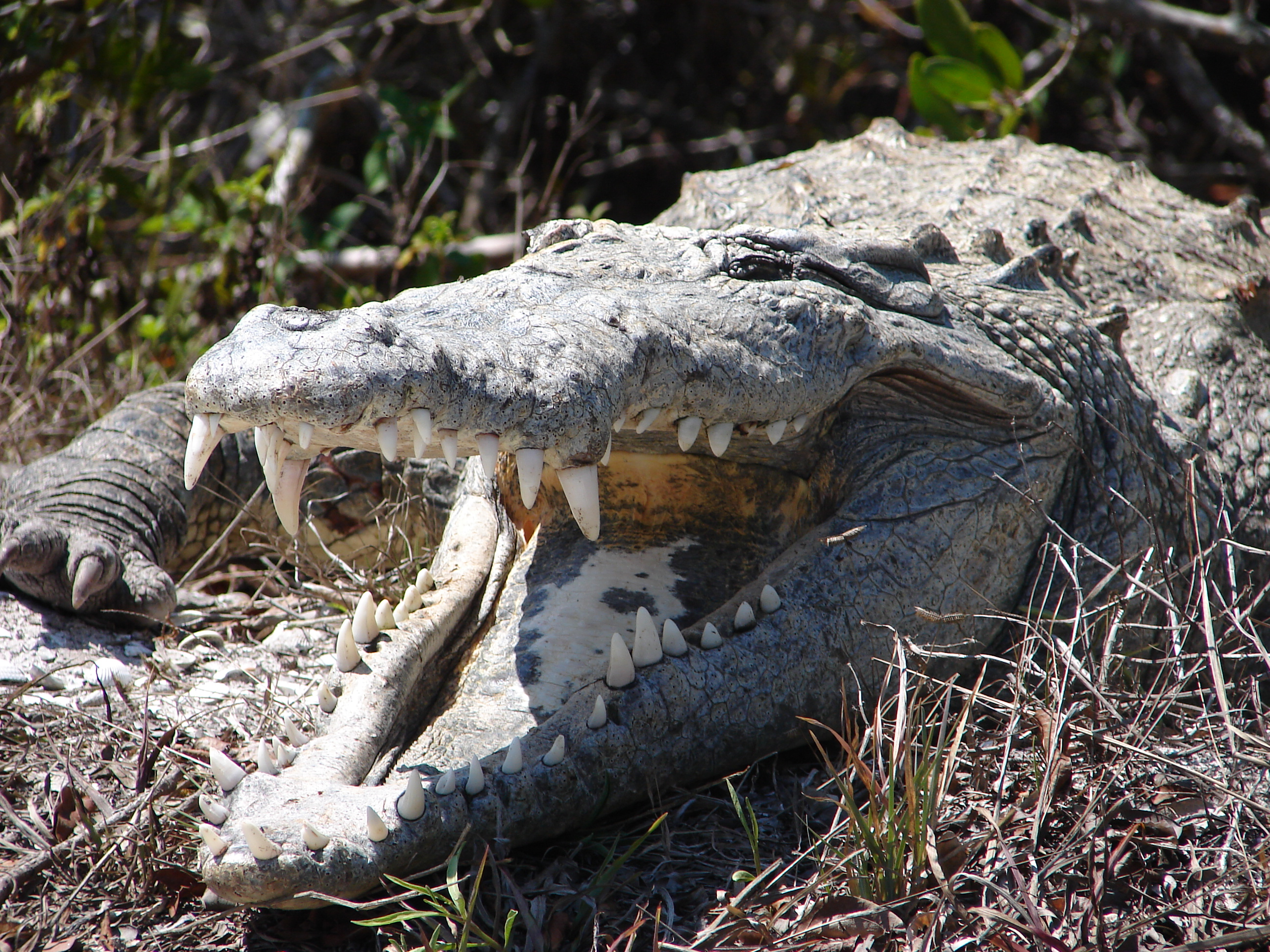
American crocodile (Crocodylus acutus)

== Access ==
Due to its extreme isolation, the Darién National Park is not very accessible. There are, however, two places where the park is often visited. Santa Cruz de Cana (more simply known as Cana) is one of them. Set in the middle of the park near the eastern slope of Cerro Pirre, Cana is one of Panama's most incredible outdoor areas. It has been called one of the world's ten greatest bird watching spots. There are several trails and a ranger station there.

The second point of access is Pirre Station. This is an ANAM ranger station set on the opposite side of Cerro Pirre. This area has primary forests and an abundance of wildlife, including several types of monkeys, sloths, and many bird species. There are several trails leading away from the ranger station that can be hiked. Travelers can stay in a basic dormitory at the ranger station.

The park is notable for the Darién Gap, the only break in the Pan-American Highway on its intercontinental path from Argentina to Alaska.
