= Púcuro =

Coordinates: 8.0167°N 77.5000°W

- Corregimiento
- Location within Panama
- Country: Panama
- Province: Darién
- District: Pinogana

Area
  - Land: 78.4 km^{2} (30.3 sq mi)

Population (2010)
  - Total: 356
  - Density: 4.5/km^{2} (12/sq mi)
- Population density calculated based on land area.
- Time zone: UTC−5 (EST)
- Climate: Am

Púcuro is a corregimiento in Pinogana District, Darién Province, Panama with a population of 356 as of 2010. Its population as of 1990 was 358; its population as of 2000 was 295. It lies along the Púcuro river, which is a tributary of the Tuira.
