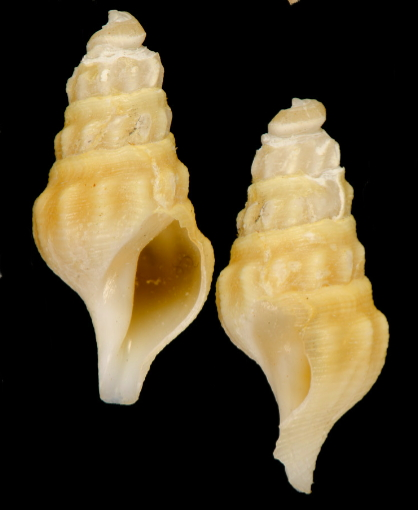
- Shell of Leucosyrinx powelli (holotype at the Smithsonian Institution)

Scientific classification
- Kingdom: Animalia
- Phylum: Mollusca
- Class: Gastropoda
- Subclass: Caenogastropoda
- Order: Neogastropoda
- Superfamily: Conoidea
- Family: Pseudomelatomidae
- Genus: Leucosyrinx
- Species: L. powelli

Binomial name
- Leucosyrinx powelli Rehder & Ladd, 1973

Synonyms
- Comitas powelli Rehder & Ladd, 1973

= Leucosyrinx powelli =

Species of gastropod

Leucosyrinx powelli is a species of sea snail, a marine gastropod mollusc in the family Pseudomelatomidae.

== Description ==
The length of the shell attains 13 mm.

The holotype is the only known specimen, with SL 13.0 mm. Although the outer lip of the aperture is broken, judging from the growth lines, the shape of the anal sinus corresponds to that of other species of Leucosyrinx. The species is very similar if different from Leucosyrinx herilda (Dall, 1908)

== Distribution ==
This marine species occurs on Mid-Pacific Ocean Seamounts between Marshall Islands and Hawaii at depths between 1581 m and 1617 m.
