= Pinogana District =

Pinogana
- District

- Location of the district capital in Panama
- Coordinates: 8°7′48″N 77°42′36″W
- Country: Panama
- Province: Darién Province
- Capital: El Real de Santa María

Area
  - Total: 1,892 sq mi (4,901 km^{2})

Population (2019)
  - Total: 26,160
  - Density: 13.82/sq mi (5.338/km^{2})
- official estimate
- Time zone: UTC-5 (ETZ)

Pinogana District (Spanish pronunciation: [pinoˈɣana]) is a district (distrito) of Darién Province in Panama. The population according to the 2000 census was 12,823; the latest estimate (for 2019) is 26,160. The district covers a total area of 4,901 km^{2} (1,892 sq mi). The capital lies at the town of El Real de Santa María.

== Administrative divisions ==
Pinogana District is divided administratively into the following corregimientos:

- El Real de Santa María
- Boca de Cupe
- Paya
- Pinogana
- Púcuro
- Yape
- Yaviza
- Metetí

Note: - The indigenous comarca of Wargandi lies within Pinogana District; although it constitutes administratively and independently as a separate corregimiento).
