= Bay of San Miguel =

Bay of the Gulf of Panama

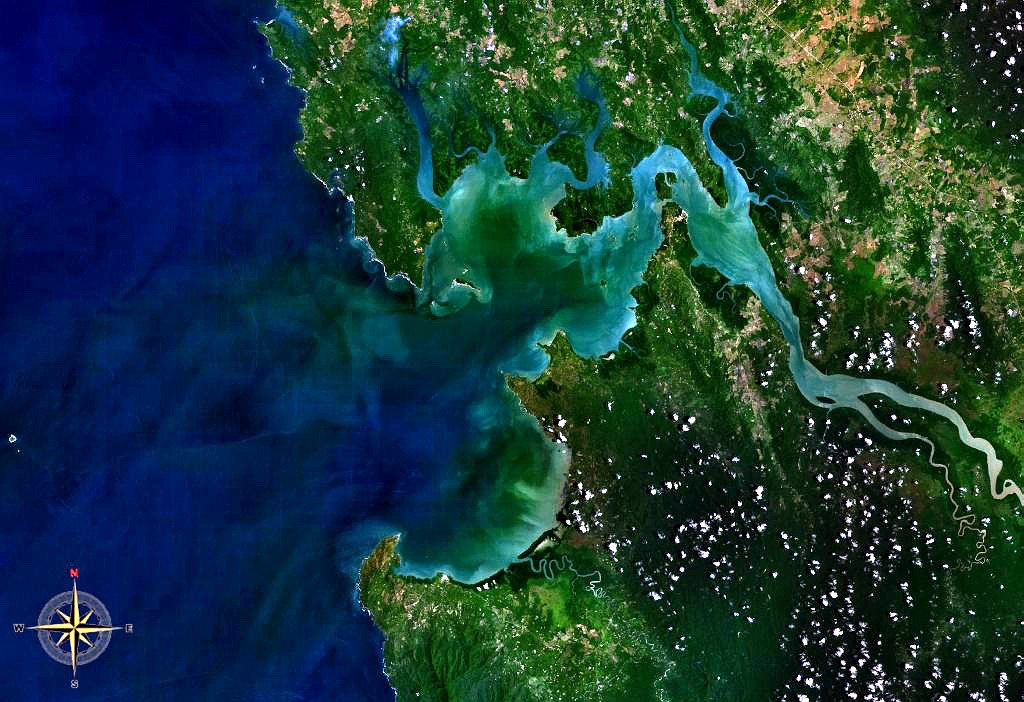
Golfo de San Miguel seen from space

The Bay of San Miguel or Gulf of San Miguel (Spanish: Golfo de San Miguel) is a bay of the Gulf of Panama, located on the Pacific coast of Darién Province in eastern Panama.

The bay is the drainage of the Chucunaque-Tuira Basin to the Pacific Ocean. It is fed by the Chucunaque and Tuira river systems that cover three fourths of Darién Province. At its southern end is Cape Garachiné (also known as Point Garachina), and at its northern end is Punta San Lorenzo (a.k.a. Cape Gardo).

== See also ==
- Gulf of Panama topics
