= El Real de Santa María =

- Corregimiento
- Location within Panama
- Coordinates: 8°7′48″N 77°42′36″W
- Country: Panama
- Province: Darién
- District: Pinogana

Area
  - Land: 120.1 km^{2} (46.4 sq mi)

Population (2010)
  - Total: 1,183
  - Density: 9.9/km^{2} (26/sq mi)
- Population density calculated based on land area.
- Time zone: UTC−5 (EST)
- Climate: Aw

El Real de Santa María is a corregimiento in Pinogana District, Darién Province, Panama with a population of 1,183 as of 2010. It is the seat of Pinogana District. Its population as of 1990 was 1,201; its population as of 2000 was 1,185.

The town of El Real is on the Pirre River, a small tributary of the Tuira River. It is 17 kilometres (11 mi) by boat to the town of Yaviza, the terminus of the Pan American Highway.

The town was founded by the Spanish as a fort in 1665 to protect their gold mining interests in the area. The English Buccaneer Bartholomew Sharp took over the town and fort in 1680, but found the Spanish had removed most of the gold they hoped to seize, and left after a few days.

El Real Airport is an airstrip serving the area.
