= Colombia–Panama border =

International border

The Darién Gap and the break in the Pan-American Highway between Yaviza, Panama, and Turbo, Colombia

The Colombia–Panama border is the 266-kilometer-long (165 mi) international boundary between Colombia and Panama. It also splits the Darién Gap, a break across the North American and South American continents. This large watershed, forest, and mountainous area is in the north-western portion of Colombia's Chocó Department and south-eastern portion of Panama's Darién Province.

There is also a gap in the Pan-American Highway that begins in Turbo, Colombia, and ends in Yaviza, Panama, and is 106 km (66 mi) long. Road-building through this area is expensive and the environmental cost is high, and no political consensus in favour of road construction has emerged.

== Description ==
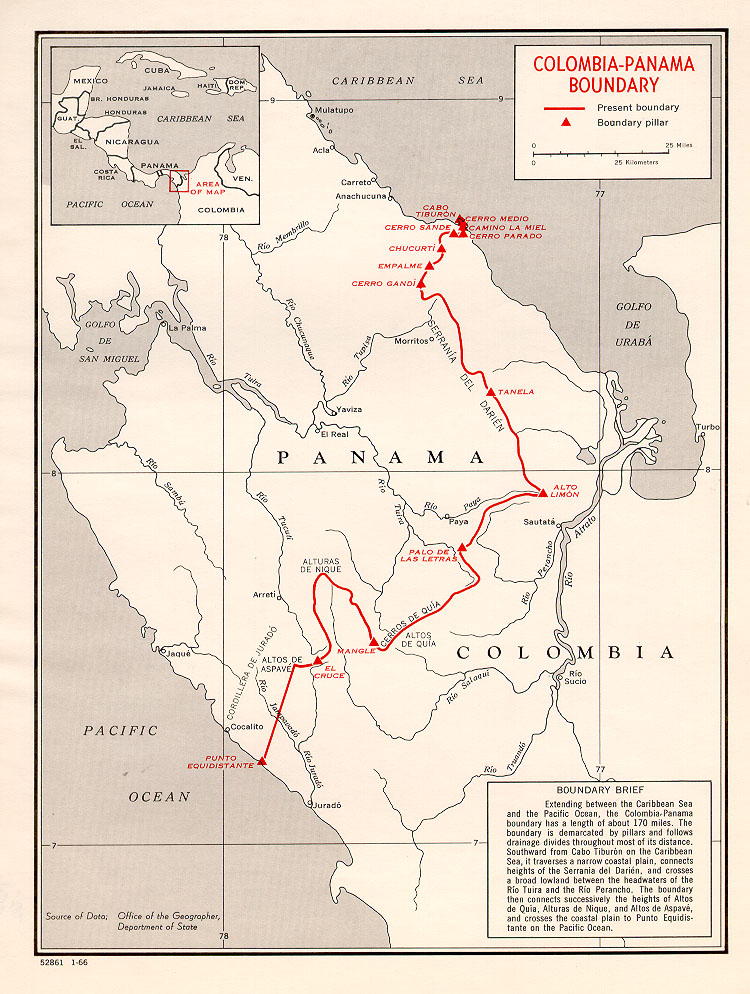
Map of the border

The border starts in the north at Cabo Tiburón on the Caribbean coast and proceeds overland to the south-west and then south-east via various peaks of the Serranía del Darién range as far as Alto Limón. It then proceeds south-westwards, except for a northwards Colombian protrusion in the vicinity of Cerro Pirre, terminating in the south on the Pacific coast at Punto Equidistante.

The geography of the Colombian side is dominated primarily by the river delta of the Atrato River, which creates a flat marshland at least 80 km (50 mi) wide, half of this being swampland. The Serranía del Baudó range extends along Colombia's Pacific coast and into Panama. The Panamanian side, in sharp contrast, is a mountainous rainforest, with terrain reaching from 60 m (197 ft) in the valley floors to 1,845 m (6,053 ft) at the tallest peak (Cerro Tacarcuna, in the Serranía del Darién).

== History ==
=== Pre-Columbian history ===
Archaeological knowledge of this area has received relatively little attention compared to its adjoining neighbors to the north and south, despite the fact that scholars such as Max Uhle, William Henry Holmes, C. V. Hartman, and George Grant MacCurdy undertook studies of archaeological sites and collections here over a century ago that were augmented by further research by Samuel Kirkland Lothrop, John Alden Mason, Doris Zemurray Stone, William Duncan Strong, Gordon Willey, and others in the early 20th century. One of the reasons for the relative lack of attention is the lack of research by locals themselves into ancestral monuments and architecture and a long history of ethnocentric perceptions by Western scholars of what represents civilization. There are a large number of sites with impressive platform mounds, plazas, paved roads, stone sculpture, and artifacts made from jade, gold, and ceramic materials.

The Darién Gap is home to the Embera-Wounaan and Guna (and the former home of the Cueva people before the 16th century). Travel is often by specialized canoes (piragua). On the Panamanian side, La Palma is the capital of the province and the main cultural centre. Corn, cassava, plantains, and bananas are staple crops wherever land is developed.

The Guna were living in what is now Northern Colombia and the Darién Province of Panama at the time of the Spanish invasion, and only later began to move westward due to a conflict with the Spanish and other indigenous groups. Centuries before the conquest, the Guna arrived in South America as part of a Chibchan migration moving east from Central America. At the time of the Spanish invasion, they were living in the region of Uraba and near the borders of what are now Antioquia and Caldas. The Guna themselves attribute their migrations to conflicts with other chiefdoms, and their migration to nearby islands to the mosquito populations on the mainland.

=== European settlement ===
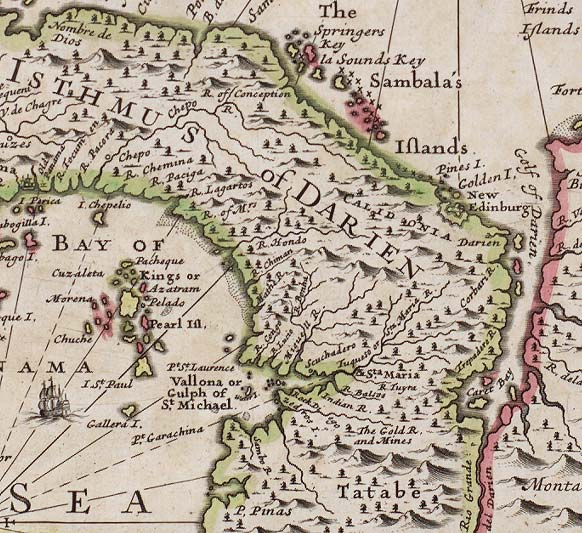
"A New Map of the Isthmus of Darien in America, The Bay of Panama, The Gulph of Vallona or St. Michael, with its Islands and Countries Adjacent". In A letter giving a description of the Isthmus of Darian, Edinburgh: 1699.

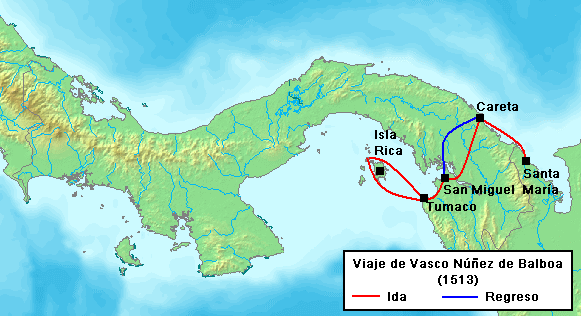
Núñez de Balboa's travel route to the South Sea, 1513

Alonso de Ojeda and Vasco Núñez de Balboa explored the coast of Colombia in 1500 and 1501. They spent the most time in the Gulf of Urabá, where they made contact with the Guna. The regional border was initially created in 1508 after royal decree, to separate the colonial governorships of Castilla de Oro and Nueva Andalucía, using the River Atrato as the boundary between the two governorships.

Vasco Núñez de Balboa heard of the South Sea from locals while sailing along the Caribbean coast. On 25 September 1513 he saw the Pacific. In 1519 the town of Panamá was founded near a small indigenous settlement on the Pacific coast. After the European discovery of Peru, it developed into an important port of trade and became an administrative centre. In 1671 the Welsh pirate Henry Morgan crossed the Isthmus of Panamá from the Caribbean side and destroyed the city. The town was relocated some kilometers to the west at a small peninsula. The ruins of the old town, Panamá Viejo, are preserved and were declared a UNESCO World Heritage Site in 1997.

The area of modern Colombia (then including Panama) was organised into the Presidency of New Granada in 1564, later upgraded to a Viceroyalty in 1718, being demoted the following year, but restored as a Viceroyalty in 1739. New Granada encompassed the territory of modern Panama, Colombia, Venezuela and Ecuador. Silver and gold from the viceroyalty of Peru were transported overland across the Darién isthmus by Spanish Silver Train to Porto Bello, where Spanish treasure fleets shipped them to Seville and Cádiz from 1707. Lionel Wafer spent four years between 1680 and 1684 among the Guna.

Scotland tried to establish a settlement in 1698 through the Darien scheme, independent Scotland's one major attempt at colonialism. The first expedition of five ships (Saint Andrew, Caledonia, Unicorn, Dolphin, and Endeavour) set sail from Leith on July 14, 1698, with around 1,200 people on board. Their orders were "to proceed to the Bay of Darien, and make the Isle called the Golden Island ... some few leagues to the leeward of the mouth of the great River of Darien ... and there make a settlement on the mainland". After calling at Madeira and the West Indies, the fleet made landfall off the coast of Darien on November 2. The settlers christened their new home "New Caledonia".

The aim was for the colony to have an overland route that connected the Pacific and Atlantic oceans. From its contemporary time to the present day, claims have been made that the undertaking was beset by poor planning and provisioning, divided leadership, a poor choice of trade goods, devastating epidemics of disease, reported attempts by the East India Company to frustrate it, as well as a failure to anticipate the Spanish Empire's military response. It was finally abandoned in March 1700 after a siege by Spanish forces, which also blockaded the harbour. As the Company of Scotland was backed by approximately 20% of all the money circulating in Scotland, its failure left the entire Lowlands in substantial financial ruin and English financial incentives were a factor in persuading those in power to support the 1707 Acts of Union. According to this argument, the Scottish establishment (landed aristocracy and mercantile elites) considered that their best chance of being part of a major power would be to share the benefits of England's international trade and the growth of the English overseas possessions, so its future would have to lie in unity with England. Furthermore, Scotland's nobles were almost bankrupted by the Darien fiasco. The land where the Darien colony was built, in the modern province of Guna Yala, is virtually uninhabited today.

=== Post-colonial period ===
In 1810, Colombia declared independence from Spain, and united with Venezuela (and later Panama and Ecuador) to form Gran Colombia in 1819. The union split however in 1829–30, with Colombia (including Panama) separating off as the Republic of New Granada. In 1858, this was renamed the Granadine Confederation, and in 1855 the state of Panama was created within it, with the border with the rest of the Confederation fixed the same years. The federal country was renamed the United States of Colombia in 1863, however the country was centralised in 1885. Panamanian separatism grew, with the country declaring independence in 1903 with the backing of the United States, who wished to build a canal across the country.

On April 6, 1914, Colombia and the United States signed a treaty which recognised the 1855 Colombia–Panama border. Colombia and Panama concluded the Victoria-Velez Treaty in Bogotá on August 20, 1924, a border treaty signed by the foreign ministers of Panama, Nicolas Victoria, and Colombia, Jorge Velez. This treaty was officially registered in the Register No. 814 of the League of Nations Treaty Series, on August 17, 1925. The border was again based on the same Colombian law of June 9, 1855. The border was then demarcated on the ground via series of pillars, with the final alignment confirmed on June 17, 1938.

=== Migrant crises ===
Cubans entering the United States are typically able to receive residency under the Cuban Adjustment Act of 1966, making Puerto Obaldia a popular crossing point for Cuban migrants traveling to the United States. The decision to close the border was made because Costa Rica and Nicaragua had closed their borders to Cubans heading north. The closing of the Panama-Colombia border resulted in a number of migrants being stranded in Turbo, a transit point for migrants. Some of the Cubans began protesting, demanding to be airlifted to Mexico.

== See also ==
- Colombia–Panama relations
- Darién Gap
- Darien scheme
- Gulf of Darién
- Lionel Wafer
