= Tuira River =

River in Panama

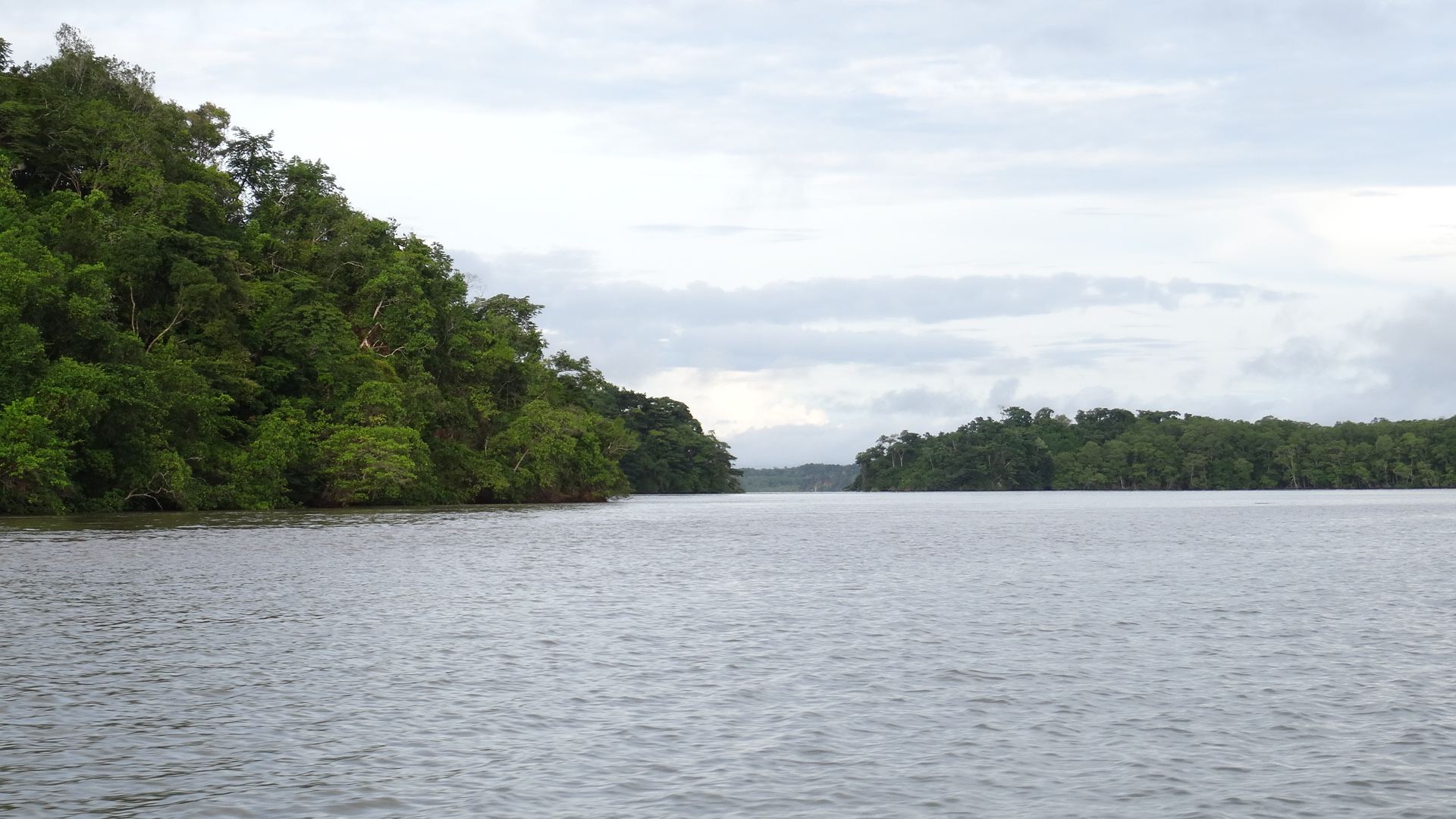

- Location of mouth
- Native name: Rio Tuira (Spanish)

Location
- Country: Panama
- Province: Darién Province

Physical characteristics
- Mouth
  - coordinates: 8°19′10″N 78°18′31″W
  - elevation: 0 m (0 ft)
- Length: 230 km (140 mi)
- Basin size: 10,788.2 km^{2} (4,165.3 mi^{2})
- Discharge
  - location: Near mouth
  - average: (Period: 1971–2000)651 m^{3}/s (23,000 cu ft/s)

Basin features
- Progression: Bay of San Miguel (Pacific Ocean)
- River system: Tuira River
- Tributaries
  - left: Pirre, Balsas
  - right: Chucunaque

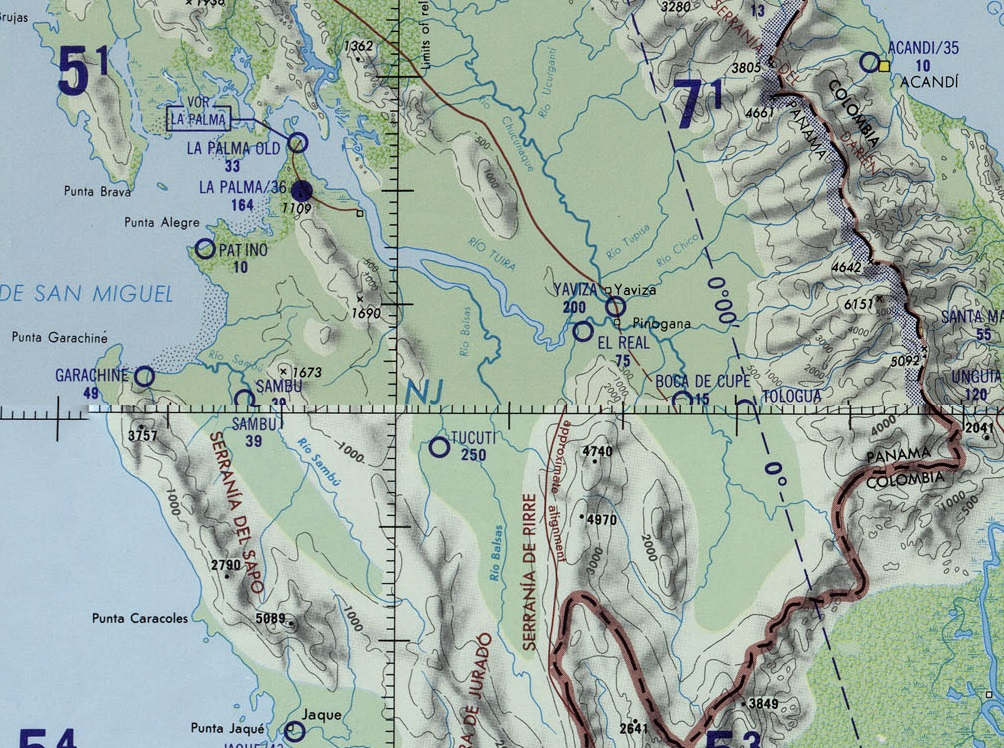
U.S. Defense Mapping Agency maps excerpt showing course of Tuira river

The Tuira River is located in the Darién Province of eastern Panama. It flows into the Bay of San Miguel at the province capital of La Palma.

It is the largest river in Panama, and one of its tributaries, the Chucunaque River, is the longest river in Panama.

The river starts in highlands of Darien, and runs south/southeast, and then north and west. It runs past villages as it flows downstream including Matuganti, Sobiaquirú, El Balsal, Boca de Cupe, Capetí, Yape, Aruza, Unión Chocó, Vista Alegre, and Pinogana. It meets the Chucunaque River at El Real de Santa María and then flows northwest towards La Palma. Via the Chucunaque, one can reach Yaviza, which is the terminus of the northern end of the Pan-American Highway.

The Paya River joins the river downstream of Sobiaquirú, via which the village of Paya can be reached. The Púcuro River joins downstream of the Paya, via which the village of Púcuro can be reached.
