= Gulf of Panama =

Gulf in the Pacific Ocean

Coordinates: 8.08642°N 79.28284°W

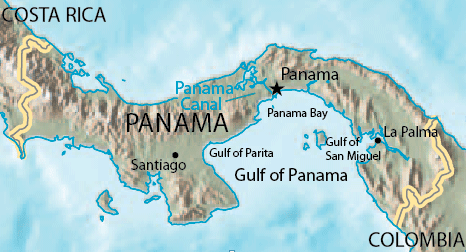
Gulf of Panama with minor gulfs

The Gulf of Panama (Spanish: Golfo de Panamá) is a gulf of the Pacific Ocean off the southern coast of Panama, where most of eastern Panama's southern shores adjoin it. The Gulf has a maximum width of 250 kilometres (160 mi; 130 nmi), a maximum depth of 220 metres (722 ft) and the size of 2,400 square kilometres (930 sq mi). The Panama Canal connects the Gulf of Panama with the Caribbean Sea, thus linking the Pacific and Atlantic oceans. The Panamanian capital Panama City is the main urban centre on the gulf shore.

The Gulf itself also contains a few minor gulfs, with Panama Bay to the north, Gulf of Parita to the west and Gulf of San Miguel to the east. The gulf has a few islands and on the coast there are a few important ports, like Panama City, La Palma and Chitrè. The Pearl Islands archipelago is a group of over two hundred islands situated to the east in the gulf.

Panama’s largest river, the Tuira, flows south into the Gulf of San Miguel.

== Tourism ==
Tourism is a very large part of the Panamanian economy, and much of it revolves around Panama Bay. The most popular attraction is the Pearl Islands, with its clear, nutrient-rich water and diverse wildlife drawing many tourists and divers to explore the archipelago. Since the Pearl Islands are the most popular tourist destination in Panama Bay, the local communities have adapted and changed due to the touristic developments. Some islands, such as Pedro González, have been positively affected by the boom in tourism, as the Islanders believe it is good for the local economy. The local inhabitants of other islands such as Contadora believe that tourism is bad for the islands, and wish to preserve the local culture.

== Climate ==
The climate in the Panama Bay region is extreme, ranging from an extreme dry season (January to April) to an extreme wet season (May to December). This has had a major influence on the mangroves in the region since the dry season as well as El Niño bring strong storms that can damage the mangroves and disrupt their reproductive cycles.

== Mangroves ==
Mangroves are an essential part of the bay ecosystem and habitats. These mangroves are crucial to the local bird species' long-term survival, as they provide shelter and nutrients to the local bird species. Over 20 species were documented in the bay at over 57 locations, mostly in the Pearl Island region. Brown pelicans are the most abundant birds in the bay, with cattle egrets and great egrets also populating a large portion. The other most plentiful birds in the bay include the sooty tern, bridled tern, white ibis, glossy ibis, little blue heron, cocoi heron, bare-throated tiger heron, black-crowned night heron, blue footed booby, brown booby, magnificent frigatebird, great egret, and snowy egret. The seabirds also are an indicator of the health of the fish, which rely on the nutrient-rich debris of the mangroves to survive.

Mangroves have also been used by local communities for centuries for their charcoal, long-lasting fuel wood, poles, and bark. They are still an important part of the local communities to this day. Since the seafood and nutrients are abundant in the waters of the bay, it has been proven an advantageous place to live for thousands of years, dating back to the late Preceramic Period, around 6000 BC. A recent discovery of dolphin remains in a Preceramic hunter-gatherer encampment on the Pearl Islands suggests that the ancient inhabitants of the islands did not only hunt small fish, but larger ones such as dolphins and sharks. The nutrient-rich water draws a significant amount of fish and sea animals to Panama Bay, giving the ancient hunter-gatherers a wide variety to choose from. Evidence was found that these inhabitants lived mainly off of fish and turtles in the bay, but dolphins and sharks were also exploited for their meat, bones, and oil. One major problem that researchers found was that it is unclear whether the primitive hunter-gatherers systematically hunted the dolphins, or merely herded them towards the islands until they became beached. Nonetheless, this is still an important discovery as it is the first Preceramic site identified in the Pearl Islands, as well as the first evidence in Central America that the early inhabitants exploited dolphins for food.

== Environmental concerns ==
There has been concern recently relating to the environmental health of Panama Bay, as the industry has grown significantly in the Panama City area in recent years, specifically the oil industry. Petroleum is both a major import and export of Panama City and as such, the concern for oil spills and how they would affect the bay is significant. Another great concern is the destruction and utilization of the mangroves in the bay. Both the wildlife in the bay and the human population rely on the mangroves for survival. The mangroves in the bay are also not only threatened by siltation by excessive erosion, dam construction, and pesticides from the local farms but also by the utilization of these mangroves for industrial farming.

== Laws and regulations ==
The creation of the Panama Canal in 1914 was a major breakthrough in terms of international transport, as it formed Panama and the surrounding area as a new international hub of trade and transport. However, although it brought business to the area, the new boom in transport in the area took a major toll on the environment. As the Panamanian economy has grown over the years, so have the laws and policies relating to it, specifically marine policy. Marine resources in and around Panama Bay are key to many major industries such as farming and fishing, and over 80% of the surrounding population directly rely on them to survive. Although the laws that have been put into place over the years made major changes to the infrastructure and government, there are still major gaps in the enforcement and structure of these laws.

Many of the laws put into place did not have the conservation of the environment in mind and mainly focused on business. Water treatment is a major problem in Panama Bay, as much of the once pure water is now polluted with sewage and chemical waste. Sewage treatment is poor in a large portion of Panama, and due to the lack of proper waste management plants, raw sewage from sewage tanks is often dumped into the bay with little to no treatment. Panama City and the surrounding areas draw clean drinking water from the Panama Canal watershed, but the recent boom in urbanization and pollution threatens the quality of the drinking water. The Panamanian Government as well as non-governmental organizations are working towards the conservation of the watershed, but the loose laws towards industry and waste management make this hard to achieve.

== Conservation efforts ==
In 2009, Panama Bay was declared a "Wetland of International Importance" by the Ramsar Convention, an international convention for the protection of wetlands of international importance. However, this status was temporarily suspended in 2012 by the Panamanian Government to protect Industry and farming. This sparked controversy amongst environmentalists, and in 2013 the bay regained protected status under the Panamanian Supreme Court, with the help and support of the Panama Audubon Society.

In February 2015, the Panamanian President Juan Carlos Varela signed into law the ban on construction in the 210,000-acre area of the Bay of Panama, and declared the bay a "wetlands complex as a protected wildlife refuge area". This action was controversial within the Panamanian Government as the previous president, Ricardo Martinelli, was criticized by environmentalists for his neglect of the destruction of the mangroves in Panama Bay. This law was put into place mainly to conserve the mangrove forests and stop erosion, as well as to protect the habitats of the migratory shorebirds.
