= Yaviza =

- Corregimiento and town
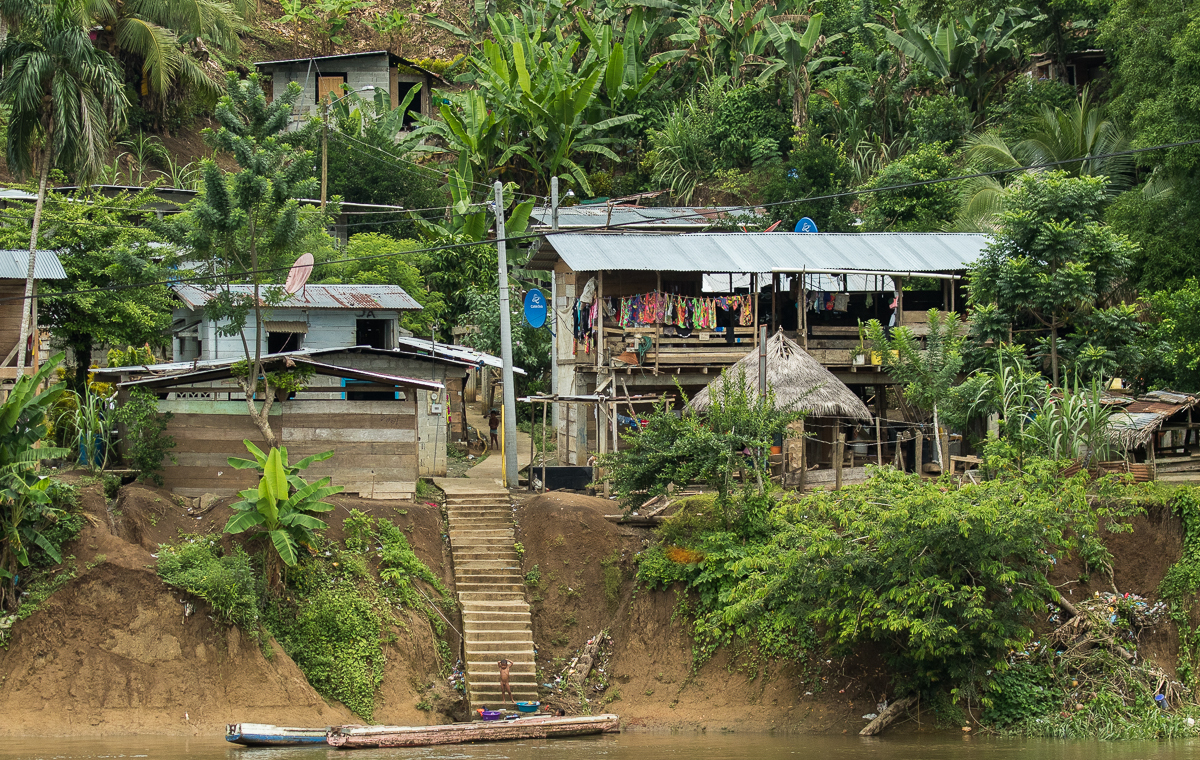

- Location within Panama
- Coordinates: 8°9′18″N 77°41′31″W
- Country: Panama
- Province: Darién
- District: Pinogana

Area
  - Land: 397.1 km^{2} (153.3 sq mi)

Population (2010)
  - Total: 4,441
  - Density: 11.2/km^{2} (29/sq mi)
- Population density calculated based on land area.
- Time zone: UTC−5 (EST)
- Climate: Tropical monsoon climate (Am)

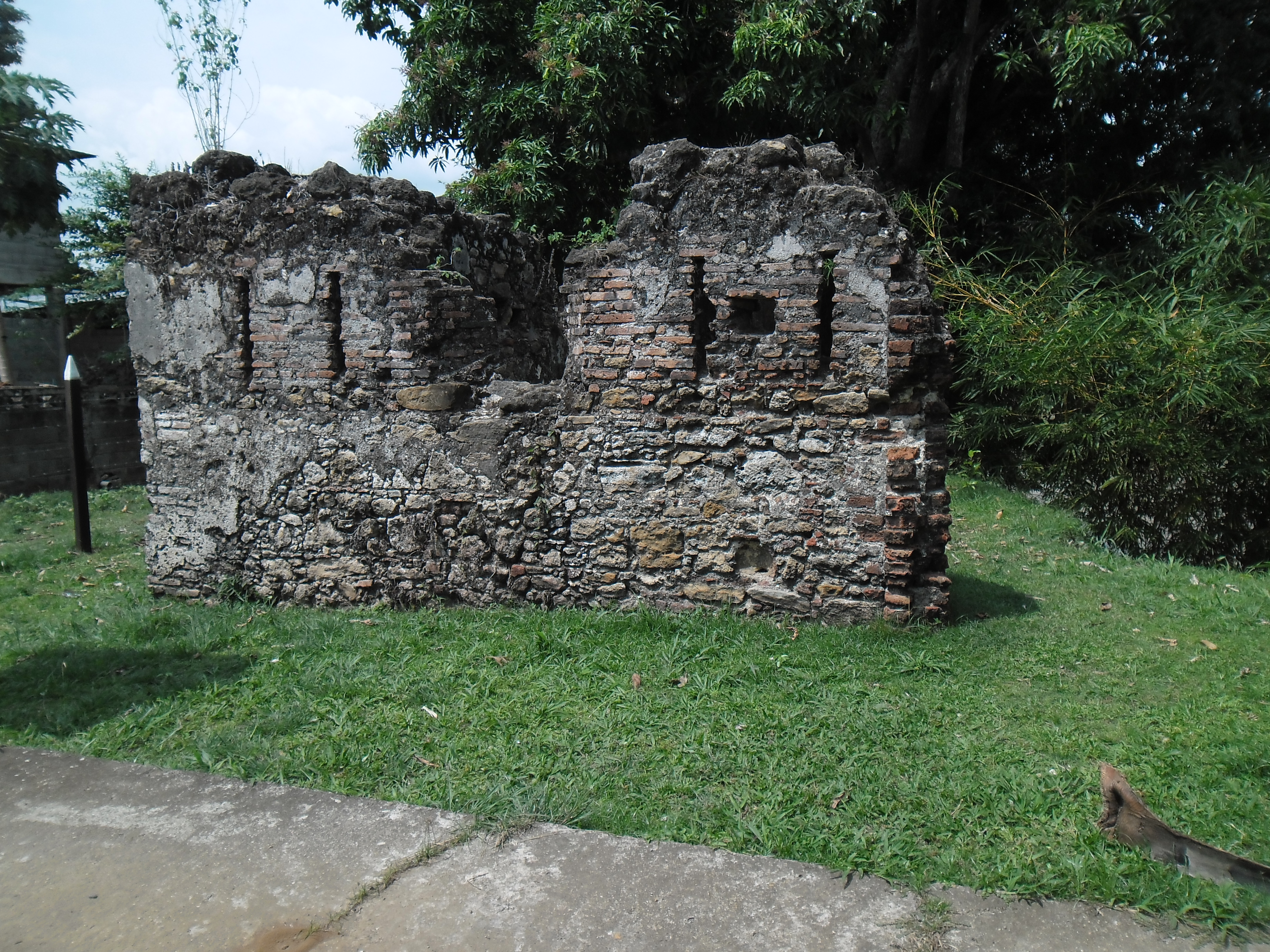
Ruins of the Fort of San Gerónimo de Yaviza

Yaviza is a town and corregimiento in Pinogana District, Darién Province, Panama with a population of 4,441 as of 2010.

== Location ==
The town marks the southeastern end of the northern half of the Pan-American Highway, at the north end of the Darién Gap. It lies on the Chucunaque River, a major tributary of the Tuira River, along which travel by boat into the Darién Gap occurs. The nearest town on the river route is El Real de Santa María, which is the capital of Pinogana District.

== Demographics ==
The population of Yaviza as of 1990 was 8,452, falling to 3,317 as recorded in the year 2000, and rising to 4,441 as of 2010.

== History ==
The town was founded by Spanish missionaries as San Jerónimo de Yaviza in September 1638. A Spanish fort (Fuerte de San Geronimo de Yaviza) was built in 1760, and heavily damaged by an attack of the Indigenous Guna in 1780. A flood destroyed half of the remaining ruins in the mid-20th century.

Map of the Darién Gap and the break in the Pan-American Highway between Yaviza, Panama and Turbo, Colombia

As the Pan-American Highway was constructed, it eventually reached Yaviza as a dirt road. But plans to complete the road to Colombia were stopped, leaving Yaviza as the end point of the northern half of the highway. The final sections of the highway to Yaviza have since been improved and are now paved.
