= Chucunaque River =

River in Panama

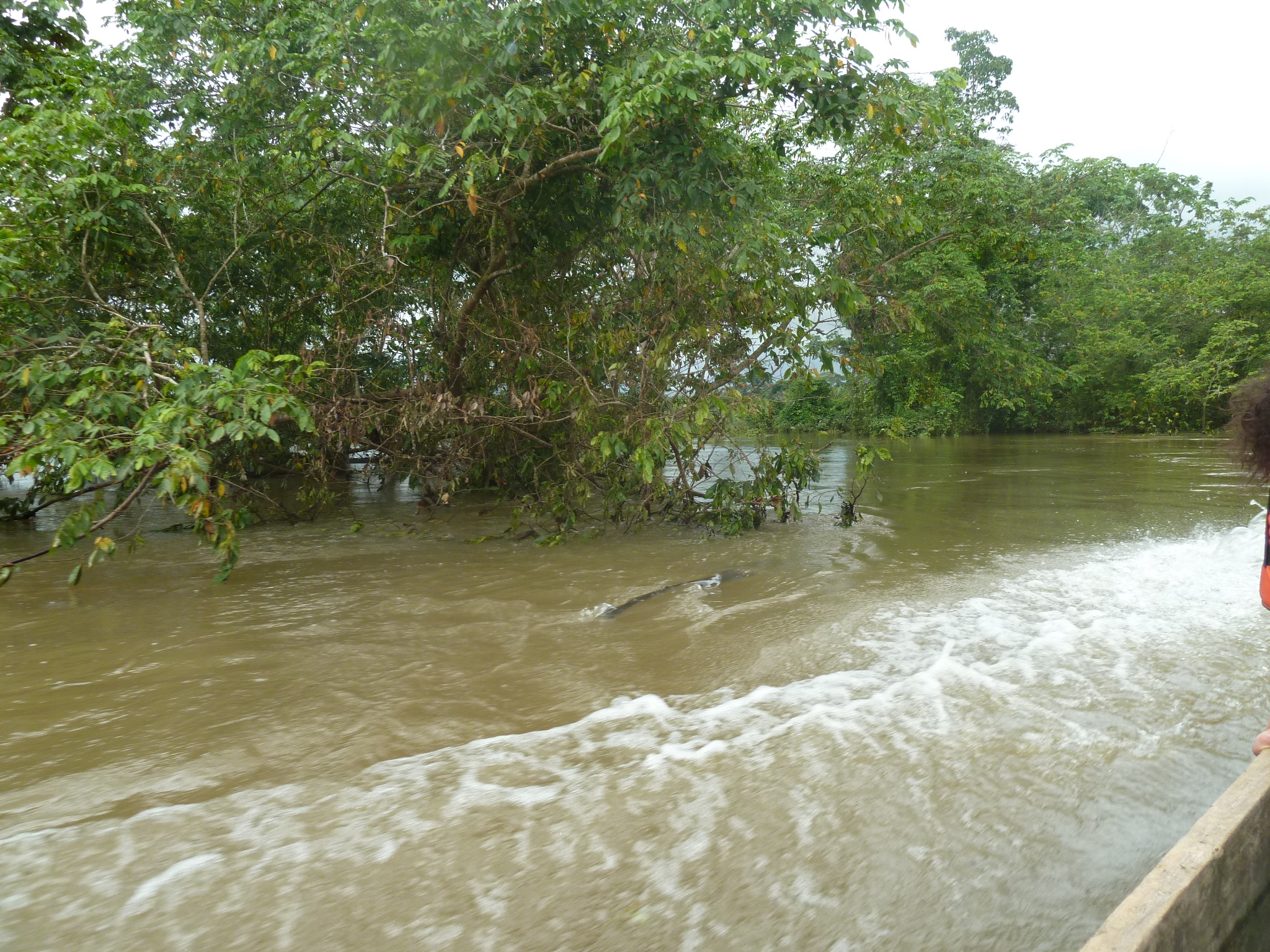

- Location of mouth

Location
- Country: Panama

Physical characteristics
- Mouth
  - coordinates: 8°07′31″N 77°44′41″W

The Chucunaque River is a river of Panama. It is a tributary of the Tuira River in the Darién Province. It is the longest river in Panama.

== See also ==
- List of rivers of Panama
