= List of airports by IATA code: B =

The DST column shows the months in which Daylight Saving Time, a.k.a. Summer Time, begins and ends. A blank DST box usually indicates that the location stays on Standard Time all year, although in some cases the location stays on Summer Time all year. If a location is currently on DST, add one hour to the time in the Time column.

| IATA | ICAO | Airport name | Location served | Time | DST |
-BA-
| BAA | AYBL | Bialla Airport | Bialla, Papua New Guinea | UTC+10:00 | |
| BAB | KBAB | Beale Air Force Base | Marysville, California, United States | UTC−08:00 | Mar-Nov |
| BAC | | Barranca de Upia Airport | Barranca de Upía, Colombia | UTC−05:00 | |
| BAD | KBAD | Barksdale Air Force Base | Bossier City, Louisiana, United States | UTC−06:00 | Mar-Nov |
| BAE | LFMR | Barcelonnette – Saint-Pons Airport | Barcelonnette, Alpes-de-Haute-Provence, France | UTC+01:00 | Mar-Oct |
| BAF | KBAF | Westfield-Barnes Regional Airport | Westfield / Springfield, Massachusetts, United States | UTC−05:00 | Mar-Nov |
| BAG | RPUB | Loakan Airport | Baguio, Philippines | UTC+08:00 | |
| BAH | OBBI | Bahrain International Airport | Manama, Bahrain | UTC+03:00 | |
| BAI | MRBA | Buenos Aires Airport | Buenos Aires, Costa Rica | UTC−06:00 | |
| BAJ | | Bali Airport | Bali, Papua New Guinea | UTC+10:00 | |
| BAK | | metropolitan area^{2} | Baku, Azerbaijan | UTC+04:00 | |
| BAL | LTCJ | Batman Airport | Batman, Turkey | UTC+03:00 | |
| BAM | KBAM | Battle Mountain Airport (Lander County Airport) | Battle Mountain, Nevada, United States | UTC−08:00 | Mar-Nov |
| BAN | FZVR | Basongo Airport | Basongo, Democratic Republic of the Congo | UTC+02:00 | |
| BAP | | Baibara Airport | Baibara, Papua New Guinea | UTC+10:00 | |
| BAQ | SKBQ | Ernesto Cortissoz International Airport | Barranquilla, Colombia | UTC−05:00 | |
| BAR | ZJQH | Qionghai Bo'ao Airport | Qionghai, Hainan, China | UTC+08:00 | |
| BAS | AGGE | Balalae Airport | Balalae Island, Western, Solomon Islands | UTC+11:00 | |
| BAT | SBBT | Chafei Amsei Airport | Barretos, São Paulo, Brazil | UTC−03:00 | |
| BAV | ZBOW | Baotou Airport | Baotou, Inner Mongolia, China | UTC+08:00 | |
| BAW | | Biawonque Airport | Biawonque, Gabon | UTC+01:00 | |
| BAX | UNBB | Barnaul Airport | Barnaul, Altai Krai, Russia | UTC+07:00 | |
| BAY | LRBM | Baia Mare Airport | Baia Mare, Romania | UTC+02:00 | Mar-Oct |
| BAZ | SWBC | Barcelos Airport | Barcelos, Amazonas, Brazil | UTC−04:00 | |
-BB-
| BBA | SCBA | Balmaceda Airport | Balmaceda, Chile | UTC−04:00 | Aug-May |
| BBB | KBBB | Benson Municipal Airport | Benson, Minnesota, United States | UTC−06:00 | Mar-Nov |
| BBC | KBYY | Bay City Municipal Airport (FAA: BYY) | Bay City, Texas, United States | UTC−06:00 | Mar-Nov |
| BBD | KBBD | Curtis Field | Brady, Texas, United States | UTC−06:00 | Mar-Nov |
| BBG | NGTU | Butaritari Atoll Airport | Butaritari Atoll, Kiribati | UTC+12:00 | |
| BBH | EDBH | Stralsund–Barth Airport | Stralsund / Barth, Mecklenburg-Vorpommern, Germany | UTC+01:00 | Mar-Oct |
| BBI | VEBS | Biju Patnaik International Airport | Bhubaneswar, Odisha, India | UTC+05:30 | |
| BBJ | EDRB | Bitburg Airport (former Bitburg Air Base) | Bitburg, Rhineland-Palatinate, Germany | UTC+01:00 | Mar-Oct |
| BBK | FBKE | Kasane Airport | Kasane, Botswana | UTC+02:00 | |
| BBL | YLLE | Ballera Airport | Ballera gas plant, Queensland, Australia | UTC+10:00 | |
| BBM | VDBG | Battambang Airport | Battambang, Cambodia | UTC+07:00 | |
| BBN | WBGZ | Bario Airport | Bario, Sarawak, Malaysia | UTC+08:00 | |
| BBO | HCMI | Berbera Airport | Berbera, Somalia | UTC+03:00 | |
| BBP | EGHJ | Bembridge Airport | Bembridge, England | UTC±00:00 | Mar-Oct |
| BBQ | TAPH | Burton-Nibbs International Airport | Barbuda, Antigua and Barbuda | UTC−04:00 | |
| BBR | TFFB | Baillif Airport | Basse-Terre, Guadeloupe | UTC−04:00 | |
| BBS | EGLK | Blackbushe Airport | Yateley, England | UTC±00:00 | Mar-Oct |
| BBT | FEFT | Berbérati Airport | Berbérati, Central African Republic | UTC+01:00 | |
| BBU | LRBS | Aurel Vlaicu International Airport (Băneasa Airport) | Bucharest, Romania | UTC+02:00 | Mar-Oct |
| BBV | DIGN | Nero-Mer Airport | Grand-Béréby, Ivory Coast | UTC±00:00 | |
| BBW | KBBW | Broken Bow Municipal Airport | Broken Bow, Nebraska, United States | UTC−06:00 | Mar-Nov |
| BBX | KLOM | Wings Field (FAA: LOM) | Philadelphia, Pennsylvania, United States | UTC−05:00 | Mar-Nov |
| BBY | FEFM | Bambari Airport | Bambari, Central African Republic | UTC+01:00 | |
| BBZ | FLZB | Zambezi Airport | Zambezi, Zambia | UTC+02:00 | |
-BC-
| BCA | MUBA | Gustavo Rizo Airport | Baracoa, Cuba | UTC−05:00 | Mar-Nov |
| BCB | KBCB | Virginia Tech Montgomery Executive Airport | Blacksburg, Virginia, United States | UTC−05:00 | Mar-Nov |
| BCC | | Bear Creek 3 Airport (FAA: Z48) | Bear Creek, Alaska, United States | UTC−09:00 | Mar-Nov |
| BCD | RPVB | Bacolod–Silay International Airport | Bacolod, Philippines | UTC+08:00 | |
| BCE | KBCE | Bryce Canyon Airport | Bryce Canyon, Utah, United States | UTC−07:00 | Mar-Nov |
| BCF | FEGU | Bouca Airport | Bouca, Central African Republic | UTC+01:00 | |
| BCG | | Bemichi Airport | Kumaka, Guyana | UTC−04:00 | |
| BCH | WPEC | Baucau Airport | Baucau, East Timor | UTC+09:00 | |
| BCI | YBAR | Barcaldine Airport | Barcaldine, Queensland, Australia | UTC+10:00 | |
| BCK | YBWR | Bolwarra Airport | Bolwarra, Queensland, Australia | UTC+10:00 | |
| BCL | MRBC | Barra del Colorado Airport | Barra del Colorado, Costa Rica | UTC−06:00 | |
| BCM | LRBC | Bacău International Airport | Bacău, Romania | UTC+02:00 | Mar-Oct |
| BCN | LEBL | Barcelona–El Prat Airport | Barcelona, Catalonia, Spain | UTC+01:00 | Mar-Oct |
| BCO | HABC | Baco Airport (Jinka Airport) | Jinka, Ethiopia | UTC+03:00 | |
| BCP | AYBC | Bambu Airport | Bambu, Papua New Guinea | UTC+10:00 | |
| BCQ | | Brak Airport | Brak, Libya | UTC+02:00 | |
| BCR | SWNK | Novo Campo Airport | Boca do Acre, Amazonas, Brazil | UTC−05:00 | |
| BCS | | Southern Seaplane Airport (FAA: 65LA) | Belle Chasse, Louisiana, United States | UTC−06:00 | Mar-Nov |
| BCT | KBCT | Boca Raton Airport | Boca Raton, Florida, United States | UTC−05:00 | Mar-Nov |
| BCU | | Bauchi State Airport | Bauchi, Nigeria | UTC+01:00 | |
| BCV | | Hector Silva Airstrip | Belmopan, Belize | UTC−06:00 | |
| BCW | | Benguerra Island Airport | Benguerra Island, Mozambique | UTC+02:00 | |
| BCX | UWUB | Beloretsk Airport | Beloretsk, Republic of Bashkortostan, Russia | UTC+05:00 | |
| BCY | HABU | Bulchi Airport | Bulchi, Ethiopia | UTC+03:00 | |
| BCZ | | Bickerton Island Airport | Bickerton Island, Northern Territory, Australia | UTC+09:30 | |
-BD-
| BDA | TXKF | L.F. Wade International Airport | Hamilton, British Overseas Territory of Bermuda | UTC−04:00 | Mar-Nov |
| BDB | YBUD | Bundaberg Airport | Bundaberg, Queensland, Australia | UTC+10:00 | |
| BDC | SNBC | Barra do Corda Airport | Barra do Corda, Maranhão, Brazil | UTC−03:00 | |
| BDD | YBAU | Badu Island Airport | Badu Island, Queensland, Australia | UTC+10:00 | |
| BDE | KBDE | Baudette International Airport | Baudette, Minnesota, United States | UTC−06:00 | Mar-Nov |
| BDF | | Rinkenberger RLA Airport (FAA: 3IS8) | Bradford, Illinois, United States | UTC−06:00 | Mar-Nov |
| BDG | KBDG | Blanding Municipal Airport | Blanding, Utah, United States | UTC−07:00 | Mar-Nov |
| BDH | OIBL | Bandar Lengeh Airport | Bandar Lengeh, Iran | UTC+03:30 | Mar-Sep |
| BDI | FSSB | Bird Island Airport | Bird Island, Seychelles | UTC+04:00 | |
| BDJ | WAOO | Syamsudin Noor Airport | Banjarmasin, Indonesia | UTC+08:00 | |
| BDK | DIBU | Soko Airport | Bondoukou, Ivory Coast | UTC±00:00 | |
| BDL | KBDL | Bradley International Airport | Windsor Locks / Hartford, Connecticut, United States | UTC−05:00 | Mar-Nov |
| BDM | LTBG | Bandırma Airport | Bandırma, Turkey | UTC+03:00 | |
| BDN | OPTH | Talhar Airport | Badin, Pakistan | UTC+05:00 | |
| BDO | WICC | Husein Sastranegara International Airport | Bandung, Indonesia | UTC+07:00 | |
| BDP | VNCG | Bhadrapur Airport (Chandragadhi Airport) | Bhadrapur / Chandragadhi, Nepal | UTC+05:45 | |
| BDQ | VABO | Vadodara Airport (Civil Airport Harni) | Vadodara, Gujarat, India | UTC+05:30 | |
| BDR | KBDR | Igor I. Sikorsky Memorial Airport | Bridgeport, Connecticut, United States | UTC−05:00 | Mar-Nov |
| BDS | LIBR | Brindisi – Salento Airport | Brindisi, Apulia, Italy | UTC+01:00 | Mar-Oct |
| BDT | FZFD | Gbadolite Airport | Gbadolite, Democratic Republic of the Congo | UTC+01:00 | |
| BDU | ENDU | Bardufoss Airport | Bardufoss, Norway | UTC+01:00 | Mar-Oct |
| BDV | FZRB | Moba Airport | Moba, Democratic Republic of the Congo | UTC+02:00 | |
| BDW | YBDF | Bedford Downs Airport | Bedford Downs, Western Australia, Australia | UTC+08:00 | |
| BDX | | Broadus Airport | Broadus, Montana, United States | UTC−07:00 | Mar-Nov |
| BDY | | Bandon State Airport (FAA: S05) | Bandon, Oregon, United States | UTC−08:00 | Mar-Nov |
| BDZ | AYBG | Baindoung Airport | Baindoung, Papua New Guinea | UTC+10:00 | |
-BE-
| BEA | | Bereina Airport | Bereina, Papua New Guinea | UTC+10:00 | |
| BEB | EGPL | Benbecula Airport | Benbecula, Scotland | UTC±00:00 | Mar-Oct |
| BEC | KBEC | Beech Factory Airport | Wichita, Kansas, United States | UTC−06:00 | Mar-Nov |
| BED | KBED | Laurence G. Hanscom Field | Bedford, Massachusetts, United States | UTC−05:00 | Mar-Nov |
| BEE | YBGB | Beagle Bay Airport | Beagle Bay, Western Australia, Australia | UTC+08:00 | |
| BEF | MNBL | Bluefields Airport | Bluefields, Nicaragua | UTC−06:00 | |
| BEG | LYBE | Belgrade Nikola Tesla Airport | Belgrade, Serbia | UTC+01:00 | Mar-Oct |
| BEH | KBEH | Southwest Michigan Regional Airport | Benton Harbor, Michigan, United States | UTC−05:00 | Mar-Nov |
| BEI | HABE | Beica Airport | Beica, Ethiopia | UTC+03:00 | |
| BEJ | WALK | Kalimarau Airport | Tanjung Redeb, Indonesia | UTC+08:00 | |
| BEK | VIBY | Bareilly Airport | Bareilly, Uttar Pradesh, India | UTC+05:30 | |
| BEL | SBBE | Val de Cans International Airport | Belém, Pará, Brazil | UTC−03:00 | |
| BEM | GMMD | Beni Mellal Airport | Beni Mellal, Morocco | UTC+00:00 | Mar-Oct^{1} |
| BEN | HLLB | Benina International Airport | Benghazi, Libya | UTC+02:00 | |
| BEO | YLMQ | Lake Macquarie Airport (Belmont Airport) | Newcastle, New South Wales, Australia | UTC+10:00 | Oct-Apr |
| BEP | VOBI | Bellary Airport | Bellary, Karnataka, India | UTC+05:30 | |
| BEQ | EGXH | RAF Honington | Bury St Edmunds, England | UTC±00:00 | Mar-Oct |
| BER | EDDB | Berlin Brandenburg Airport | Berlin, Germany | UTC+01:00 | Mar-Oct |
| BES | LFRB | Brest Bretagne Airport | Brest, Brittany, France | UTC+01:00 | Mar-Oct |
| BET | PABE | Bethel Airport | Bethel, Alaska, United States | UTC−09:00 | Mar-Nov |
| BEU | YBIE | Bedourie Airport | Bedourie, Queensland, Australia | UTC+10:00 | |
| BEV | LLBS | Beersheba Airport | Beersheba, Israel | UTC+02:00 | Mar-Oct |
| BEW | FQBR | Beira Airport | Beira, Mozambique | UTC+02:00 | |
| BEX | EGUB | RAF Benson | Benson, England | UTC±00:00 | Mar-Oct |
| BEY | OLBA | Beirut–Rafic Hariri International Airport / Beirut Air Base | Beirut, Lebanon | UTC+02:00 | Mar-Oct |
| BEZ | NGBR | Beru Island Airport | Beru Island, Kiribati | UTC+12:00 | |
-BF-
| BFA | SGBN | Bahía Negra Airport | Bahía Negra, Paraguay | UTC−04:00 | Oct-Mar |
| BFC | | Bloomfield Airport | Bloomfield, Queensland, Australia | UTC+10:00 | |
| BFD | KBFD | Bradford Regional Airport | Bradford, Pennsylvania, United States | UTC−05:00 | Mar-Nov |
| BFE | EDLI | Bielefeld Airport | Bielefeld, North Rhine-Westphalia, Germany | UTC+01:00 | Mar-Oct |
| BFF | KBFF | Western Nebraska Regional Airport (William B. Heilig Field) | Scottsbluff, Nebraska, United States | UTC−07:00 | Mar-Nov |
| BFG | | Bullfrog Basin Airport (FAA: U07) | Glen Canyon, Utah, United States | UTC−07:00 | Mar-Nov |
| BFH | SBBI | Bacacheri Airport | Curitiba, Paraná, Brazil | UTC−03:00 | |
| BFI | KBFI | Boeing Field/King County International Airport | Seattle, Washington, United States | UTC−08:00 | Mar-Nov |
| BFJ | ZUBJ | Bijie Feixiong Airport | Bijie, Guizhou, China | UTC+08:00 | |
| BFK | KBKF | Buckley Space Force Base | Aurora, Colorado, United States | UTC−07:00 | Mar-Nov |
| BFL | KBFL | Meadows Field Airport | Bakersfield, California, United States | UTC−08:00 | Mar-Nov |
| BFM | KBFM | Mobile Downtown Airport | Mobile, Alabama, United States | UTC−06:00 | Mar-Nov |
| BFN | FABL | Bloemfontein Airport | Bloemfontein, South Africa | UTC+02:00 | |
| BFO | FVCZ | Buffalo Range Airport | Chiredzi, Zimbabwe | UTC+02:00 | |
| BFP | KBVI | Beaver County Airport (FAA: BVI) | Beaver Falls, Pennsylvania, United States | UTC−05:00 | Mar-Nov |
| BFQ | | Bahía Piña Airport | Puerto Piña, Panama | UTC−05:00 | |
| BFR | KBFR | Virgil I. Grissom Municipal Airport | Bedford, Indiana, United States | UTC−05:00 | Mar-Nov |
| BFS | EGAA | Belfast International Airport | Belfast, Northern Ireland | UTC±00:00 | Mar-Oct |
| BFT | KARW | Beaufort County Airport (FAA: ARW) | Beaufort County, South Carolina, United States | UTC−05:00 | Mar-Nov |
| BFU | ZSBB | Bengbu Airport | Bengbu, Anhui, China | UTC+08:00 | |
| BFV | VTUO | Buriram Airport | Buriram, Thailand | UTC+07:00 | |
| BFW | DAOS | Sidi Bel Abbès Airport | Sidi Bel Abbès, Algeria | UTC+01:00 | |
| BFX | FKKU | Bafoussam Airport | Bafoussam, Cameroon | UTC+01:00 | |
-BG-
| BGA | SKBG | Palonegro International Airport | Bucaramanga, Colombia | UTC−05:00 | |
| BGB | FOGB | Booué Airport | Booué, Gabon | UTC+01:00 | |
| BGC | LPBG | Bragança Airport | Bragança, Portugal | UTC±00:00 | Mar-Oct |
| BGD | KBGD | Hutchinson County Airport | Borger, Texas, United States | UTC−06:00 | Mar-Nov |
| BGE | KBGE | Decatur County Industrial Air Park | Bainbridge, Georgia, United States | UTC−05:00 | Mar-Nov |
| BGF | FEFF | Bangui M'Poko International Airport | Bangui, Central African Republic | UTC+01:00 | |
| BGG | LTCU | Bingöl Airport | Bingöl, Turkey | UTC+03:00 | |
| BGH | GQNE | Abbaye Airport | Bogué, Mauritania | UTC±00:00 | |
| BGI | TBPB | Grantley Adams International Airport | Bridgetown, Barbados | UTC−04:00 | |
| BGJ | BIBF | Borgarfjörður Eystri Airport | Borgarfjörður eystri, Iceland | UTC±00:00 | |
| BGK | | Big Creek Airport | Big Creek, Belize | UTC−06:00 | |
| BGL | VNBL | Baglung Airport | Baglung, Nepal | UTC+05:45 | |
| BGM | KBGM | Greater Binghamton Airport (Edwin A. Link Field) | Binghamton, New York, United States | UTC−05:00 | Mar-Nov |
| BGN | UESG | Belaya Gora Airport | Belaya Gora, Yakutia, Russia | UTC+11:00 | |
| BGO | ENBR | Bergen Airport, Flesland | Bergen, Norway | UTC+01:00 | Mar-Oct |
| BGP | | Bongo Airport | Bongo, Gabon | UTC+01:00 | |
| BGQ | PAGQ | Big Lake Airport | Big Lake, Alaska, United States | UTC−09:00 | Mar-Nov |
| BGR | KBGR | Bangor International Airport | Bangor, Maine, United States | UTC−05:00 | Mar-Nov |
| BGT | | Bagdad Airport (FAA: E51) | Bagdad, Arizona, United States | UTC−07:00 | |
| BGU | FEFG | Bangassou Airport | Bangassou, Central African Republic | UTC+01:00 | |
| BGV | SSBG | Bento Gonçalves Airport | Bento Gonçalves, Rio Grande do Sul, Brazil | UTC−03:00 | |
| BGW | ORBI | Baghdad International Airport | Baghdad, Iraq | UTC+03:00 | |
| BGX | SBBG | Comandante Gustavo Kraemer Airport | Bagé, Rio Grande do Sul, Brazil | UTC−03:00 | |
| BGY | LIME | Il Caravaggio International Airport (Orio al Serio Airport) | Milan / Bergamo, Lombardy, Italy | UTC+01:00 | Mar-Oct |
| BGZ | LPBR | Braga Airport | Braga, Portugal | UTC±00:00 | Mar-Oct |
-BH-
| BHA | SESV | Los Perales Airport | Bahía de Caráquez, Ecuador | UTC−05:00 | |
| BHB | KBHB | Hancock County-Bar Harbor Airport | Bar Harbor, Maine, United States | UTC−05:00 | Mar-Nov |
| BHD | EGAC | Belfast City Airport | Belfast, Northern Ireland | UTC±00:00 | Mar-Oct |
| BHE | NZWB | Woodbourne Airport | Blenheim, New Zealand | UTC+12:00 | Sep-Apr |
| BHF | SKCP | Bahía Cupica Airport | Bahía Cupica, Colombia | UTC−05:00 | |
| BHG | | Brus Laguna Airport | Brus Laguna, Honduras | UTC−06:00 | |
| BHH | OEBH | Bisha Domestic Airport | Bisha, Saudi Arabia | UTC+03:00 | |
| BHI | SAZB | Comandante Espora Airport | Bahía Blanca, Buenos Aires, Argentina | UTC−03:00 | |
| BHJ | VABJ | Bhuj Airport / Bhuj Rudra Mata Air Force Base | Bhuj, Gujarat, India | UTC+05:30 | |
| BHK | UTSB | Bukhara International Airport | Bukhara, Uzbekistan | UTC+05:00 | |
| BHL | | Bahía de los Ángeles Airport | Bahía de los Ángeles, Baja California, Mexico | UTC−08:00 | Apr-Oct |
| BHM | KBHM | Birmingham–Shuttlesworth International Airport | Birmingham, Alabama, United States | UTC−06:00 | Mar-Nov |
| BHN | OYBN | Beihan Airport | Beihan, Yemen | UTC+03:00 | |
| BHO | VABP | Raja Bhoj Airport | Bhopal, Madhya Pradesh, India | UTC+05:30 | |
| BHP | VNBJ | Bhojpur Airport | Bhojpur, Nepal | UTC+05:45 | |
| BHQ | YBHI | Broken Hill Airport | Broken Hill, New South Wales, Australia | UTC+09:30 | Oct-Apr |
| BHR | VNBP | Bharatpur Airport | Bharatpur, Nepal | UTC+05:45 | |
| BHS | YBTH | Bathurst Airport | Bathurst, New South Wales, Australia | UTC+10:00 | Oct-Apr |
| BHT | | Brighton Downs Airport | Brighton Downs, Queensland, Australia | UTC+10:00 | |
| BHU | VABV | Bhavnagar Airport | Bhavnagar, Gujarat, India | UTC+05:30 | |
| BHV | OPBW | Bahawalpur Airport | Bahawalpur, Pakistan | UTC+05:00 | |
| BHW | | Bhagatanwala Airport | Sargodha, Pakistan | UTC+05:00 | |
| BHX | EGBB | Birmingham Airport | Birmingham, England | UTC±00:00 | Mar-Oct |
| BHY | ZGBH | Beihai Fucheng Airport | Beihai, Guangxi, China | UTC+08:00 | |
| BHZ | | metropolitan area^{3} | Belo Horizonte, Minas Gerais, Brazil | UTC−03:00 | |
-BI-
| BIA | LFKB | Bastia – Poretta Airport | Bastia, Corsica, France | UTC+01:00 | Mar-Oct |
| BIB | HCMB | Baidoa Airport | Baidoa, Somalia | UTC+03:00 | |
| BID | KBID | Block Island State Airport | Block Island, Rhode Island, United States | UTC−05:00 | Mar-Nov |
| BIE | KBIE | Beatrice Municipal Airport | Beatrice, Nebraska, United States | UTC−06:00 | Mar-Nov |
| BIF | KBIF | Biggs Army Airfield | El Paso, Texas, United States | UTC−07:00 | Mar-Nov |
| BIG | PABI | Allen Army Airfield | Delta Junction, Alaska, United States | UTC−09:00 | Mar-Nov |
| BIH | KBIH | Eastern Sierra Regional Airport | Bishop, California, United States | UTC−08:00 | Mar-Nov |
| BII | | Bikini Atoll Airport | Bikini Atoll, Marshall Islands | UTC+12:00 | |
| BIJ | | Biliau Airport | Biliau, Papua New Guinea | UTC+10:00 | |
| BIK | WABB | Frans Kaisiepo Airport | Biak, Indonesia | UTC+09:00 | |
| BIL | KBIL | Billings Logan International Airport | Billings, Montana, United States | UTC−07:00 | Mar-Nov |
| BIM | MYBS | South Bimini Airport | Bimini, Bahamas | UTC−05:00 | Mar-Nov |
| BIN | OABN | Bamyan Airport | Bamyan, Afghanistan | UTC+04:30 | |
| BIO | LEBB | Bilbao Airport | Bilbao, Basque Country, Spain | UTC+01:00 | Mar-Oct |
| BIP | | Bulimba Airport | Bulimba, Queensland, Australia | UTC+10:00 | |
| BIQ | LFBZ | Biarritz Pays Basque Airport | Biarritz, Aquitaine, France | UTC+01:00 | Mar-Oct |
| BIR | VNVT | Biratnagar Airport | Biratnagar, Nepal | UTC+05:45 | |
| BIS | KBIS | Bismarck Municipal Airport | Bismarck, North Dakota, United States | UTC−06:00 | Mar-Nov |
| BIT | VNBT | Baitadi Airport | Baitadi, Nepal | UTC+05:45 | |
| BIU | BIBD | Bíldudalur Airport | Bíldudalur, Iceland | UTC±00:00 | |
| BIV | FEFR | Bria Airport | Bria, Central African Republic | UTC+01:00 | |
| BIW | | Billiluna Airport | Billiluna, Western Australia, Australia | UTC+08:00 | |
| BIX | KBIX | Keesler Air Force Base | Biloxi, Mississippi, United States | UTC−06:00 | Mar-Nov |
| BIY | FABE | Bhisho Airport | Bhisho, South Africa | UTC+02:00 | |
| BIZ | | Bimin Airport | Bimin, Papua New Guinea | UTC+10:00 | |
-BJ-
| BJA | DAAE | Soummam – Abane Ramdane Airport | Béjaïa, Algeria | UTC+01:00 | |
| BJB | OIMN | Bojnord Airport | Bojnord, Iran | UTC+03:30 | Mar-Sep |
| BJC | KBJC | Rocky Mountain Metropolitan Airport | Denver, Colorado, United States | UTC−07:00 | Mar-Nov |
| BJD | BIBK | Bakkafjörður Airport | Bakkafjörður, Iceland | UTC±00:00 | |
| BJE | | Baleela Airport | Baleela, Sudan | UTC+03:00 | |
| BJF | ENBS | Båtsfjord Airport | Båtsfjord, Norway | UTC+01:00 | Mar-Oct |
| BJG | | Kotamobagu Mopait Airport | Kotamobagu, Indonesia | UTC+08:00 | |
| BJH | VNBG | Bajhang Airport | Bajhang, Nepal | UTC+05:45 | |
| BJI | KBJI | Bemidji Regional Airport | Bemidji, Minnesota, United States | UTC−06:00 | Mar-Nov |
| BJJ | KBJJ | Wayne County Airport | Wooster, Ohio, United States | UTC−05:00 | Mar-Nov |
| BJK | WAPK | Benjina Airport (Nangasuri Airport) | Benjina, Indonesia | UTC+09:00 | |
| BJL | GBYD | Banjul International Airport | Banjul, Gambia | UTC±00:00 | |
| BJM | HBBA | Bujumbura International Airport | Bujumbura, Burundi | UTC+02:00 | |
| BJN | | Bajone Airport | Bajone, Mozambique | UTC+02:00 | |
| BJO | SLBJ | Bermejo Airport | Bermejo, Bolivia | UTC−04:00 | |
| BJP | SBBP | Arthur Siqueira–Bragança Paulista State Airport | Bragança Paulista, São Paulo, Brazil | UTC−03:00 | |
| BJQ | | Bahja Airport | Bahja, Oman | UTC+04:00 | |
| BJR | HABD | Bahir Dar Airport | Bahir Dar, Ethiopia | UTC+03:00 | |
| BJS | | metropolitan area^{4} | Beijing, China | UTC+08:00 | |
| BJT | | Bentota River Airport | Bentota, Sri Lanka | UTC+05:30 | |
| BJU | VNBR | Bajura Airport | Bajura, Nepal | UTC+05:45 | |
| BJV | LTFE | Milas–Bodrum Airport | Milas / Bodrum, Turkey | UTC+03:00 | |
| BJW | WRKB | Bajawa Soa Airport | Bajawa, Indonesia | UTC+08:00 | |
| BJX | MMLO | Del Bajío International Airport (Guanajuato Int'l Airport) | León, Guanajuato, Mexico | UTC−06:00 | Apr-Oct |
| BJY | LYBT | Batajnica Air Base | Batajnica, Serbia | UTC+01:00 | Mar-Oct |
| BJZ | LEBZ | Badajoz Airport (Talavera la Real Air Base) | Badajoz, Extremadura, Spain | UTC+01:00 | Mar-Oct |
-BK-
| BKB | VIBK | Nal Airport | Bikaner, Rajasthan, India | UTC+05:30 | |
| BKC | PABL | Buckland Airport (FAA: BVK) | Buckland, Alaska, United States | UTC−09:00 | Mar-Nov |
| BKD | KBKD | Stephens County Airport | Breckenridge, Texas, United States | UTC−06:00 | Mar-Nov |
| BKE | KBKE | Baker City Municipal Airport | Baker City, Oregon, United States | UTC−08:00 | Mar-Nov |
| BKF | | Lake Brooks Seaplane Base | Brooks Camp, Alaska, United States | UTC−09:00 | Mar-Nov |
| BKG | KBBG | Branson Airport (FAA: BBG) | Branson, Missouri, United States | UTC−06:00 | Mar-Nov |
| BKH | PHBK | Barking Sands PMRF | Kekaha, Hawaii, United States | UTC−10:00 | |
| BKI | WBKK | Kota Kinabalu International Airport | Kota Kinabalu, Sabah, Malaysia | UTC+08:00 | |
| BKJ | GUOK | Boké Baralande Airport | Boké, Guinea | UTC±00:00 | |
| BKK | VTBS | Suvarnabhumi Airport | Bangkok, Thailand | UTC+07:00 | |
| BKL | KBKL | Cleveland Burke Lakefront Airport | Cleveland, Ohio, United States | UTC−05:00 | Mar-Nov |
| BKM | WBGQ | Bakelalan Airport | Bakelalan, Sarawak, Malaysia | UTC+08:00 | |
| BKN | UTAN | Balkanabat International Airport | Jebel, Turkmenistan | UTC+05:00 | |
| BKO | GABS | Bamako–Sénou International Airport | Bamako, Mali | UTC±00:00 | |
| BKP | YBAW | Barkly Downs Airport | Barkly Downs, Queensland, Australia | UTC+10:00 | |
| BKQ | YBCK | Blackall Airport | Blackall, Queensland, Australia | UTC+10:00 | |
| BKR | FTTK | Bokoro Airport | Bokoro, Chad | UTC+01:00 | |
| BKS | WIPL | Fatmawati Soekarno Airport | Bengkulu, Indonesia | UTC+07:00 | |
| BKT | KBKT | Blackstone Army Airfield (Allen C. Perkinson Airport) | Blackstone, Virginia, United States | UTC−05:00 | Mar-Nov |
| BKU | FMSV | Betioky Airport | Betioky, Madagascar | UTC+03:00 | |
| BKW | KBKW | Raleigh County Memorial Airport | Beckley, West Virginia, United States | UTC−05:00 | Mar-Nov |
| BKX | KBKX | Brookings Regional Airport | Brookings, South Dakota, United States | UTC−06:00 | Mar-Nov |
| BKY | FZMA | Kavumu Airport | Bukavu, Democratic Republic of the Congo | UTC+02:00 | |
| BKZ | HTBU | Bukoba Airport | Bukoba, Tanzania | UTC+03:00 | |
-BL-
| BLA | SVBC | General José Antonio Anzoátegui International Airport | Barcelona, Venezuela | UTC−04:00 | |
| BLB | MPHO | Panamá Pacífico International Airport (former Howard AFB) | Panama Pacifico, Panama | UTC−05:00 | |
| BLC | FKKG | Bali Airport | Bali, Cameroon | UTC+01:00 | |
| BLD | | Boulder City Municipal Airport (FAA: 61B) | Boulder City, Nevada, United States | UTC−08:00 | Mar-Nov |
| BLE | ESSD | Dala Airport (Borlänge Airport) | Borlänge, Sweden | UTC+01:00 | Mar-Oct |
| BLF | KBLF | Mercer County Airport | Bluefield, West Virginia, United States | UTC−05:00 | Mar-Nov |
| BLG | WBGC | Belaga Airport | Belaga, Sarawak, Malaysia | UTC+08:00 | |
| BLH | KBLH | Blythe Airport | Blythe, California, United States | UTC−08:00 | Mar-Nov |
| BLI | KBLI | Bellingham International Airport | Bellingham, Washington, United States | UTC−08:00 | Mar-Nov |
| BLJ | DABT | Mostépha Ben Boulaid Airport | Batna, Algeria | UTC+01:00 | |
| BLK | EGNH | Blackpool Airport | Blackpool, England | UTC±00:00 | Mar-Oct |
| BLL | EKBI | Billund Airport | Billund, Denmark | UTC+01:00 | Mar-Oct |
| BLM | KBLM | Monmouth Executive Airport | Belmar / Farmingdale, New Jersey, United States | UTC−05:00 | Mar-Nov |
| BLN | YBLA | Benalla Airport | Benalla, Victoria, Australia | UTC+10:00 | Oct-Apr |
| BLO | BIBL | Blönduós Airport | Blönduós, Iceland | UTC±00:00 | |
| BLP | SPBL | Huallaga Airport | Bellavista, Peru | UTC−05:00 | |
| BLQ | LIPE | Bologna Guglielmo Marconi Airport | Bologna, Emilia-Romagna, Italy | UTC+01:00 | Mar-Oct |
| BLR | VOBL | Kempegowda International Airport | Bengaluru, Karnataka, India | UTC+05:30 | |
| BLS | YBLL | Bollon Airport | Bollon, Queensland, Australia | UTC+10:00 | |
| BLT | YBTR | Blackwater Airport | Blackwater, Queensland, Australia | UTC+10:00 | |
| BLU | KBLU | Blue Canyon–Nyack Airport | Emigrant Gap, California, United States | UTC−08:00 | Mar-Nov |
| BLV | KBLV | MidAmerica St. Louis Airport / Scott Air Force Base | Belleville, Illinois, United States | UTC−06:00 | Mar-Nov |
| BLX | LIDB | Belluno Airport | Belluno, Veneto, Italy | UTC+01:00 | Mar-Oct |
| BLY | EIBT | Belmullet Aerodrome | Belmullet, Ireland | UTC±00:00 | Mar-Oct |
| BLZ | FWCL | Chileka International Airport | Blantyre, Malawi | UTC+02:00 | |
-BM-
| BMA | ESSB | Stockholm Bromma Airport | Stockholm, Sweden | UTC+01:00 | Mar-Oct |
| BMB | FZFU | Bumba Airport | Bumba, Democratic Republic of the Congo | UTC+01:00 | |
| BMC | KBMC | Brigham City Airport | Brigham City, Utah, United States | UTC−07:00 | Mar-Nov |
| BMD | FMML | Belo sur Tsiribihina Airport | Belo sur Tsiribihina, Madagascar | UTC+03:00 | |
| BME | YBRM | Broome International Airport | Broome, Western Australia, Australia | UTC+08:00 | |
| BMF | FEGM | Bakouma Airport | Bakouma, Central African Republic | UTC+01:00 | |
| BMG | KBMG | Monroe County Airport | Bloomington, Indiana, United States | UTC−05:00 | Mar-Nov |
| BMH | AYBO | Bomai Airport | Bomai, Papua New Guinea | UTC+10:00 | |
| BMI | KBMI | Central Illinois Regional Airport | Bloomington, Illinois, United States | UTC−06:00 | Mar-Nov |
| BMJ | SYBR | Baramita Airport | Baramita, Guyana | UTC−04:00 | |
| BMK | EDWR | Borkum Airfield | Borkum, Lower Saxony, Germany | UTC+01:00 | Mar-Oct |
| BML | KBML | Berlin Regional Airport | Berlin, New Hampshire, United States | UTC−05:00 | Mar-Nov |
| BMM | FOOB | Bitam Airport | Bitam, Gabon | UTC+01:00 | |
| BMN | ORBB | Bamarni Airport | Bamarni, Iraq | UTC+03:00 | |
| BMO | VYBM | Bhamo Airport | Bhamo, Myanmar | UTC+06:30 | |
| BMP | YBPI | Brampton Island Airport | Brampton Island, Queensland, Australia | UTC+10:00 | |
| BMQ | | Bamburi Airport | Bamburi, Kenya | UTC+03:00 | |
| BMR | EDWZ | Baltrum Airport | Baltrum, Lower Saxony, Germany | UTC+01:00 | Mar-Oct |
| BMS | SNBU | Socrates Mariani Bittencourt Airport | Brumado, Bahia, Brazil | UTC−03:00 | |
| BMT | KBMT | Beaumont Municipal Airport | Beaumont, Texas, United States | UTC−06:00 | Mar-Nov |
| BMU | WADB | Sultan Muhammad Salahudin Airport (Bima Airport) | Bima, Indonesia | UTC+08:00 | |
| BMV | VVBM | Buon Ma Thuot Airport | Buon Ma Thuot, Vietnam | UTC+07:00 | |
| BMW | DATM | Bordj Mokhtar Airport | Bordj Badji Mokhtar, Algeria | UTC+01:00 | |
| BMX | PABM | Big Mountain Air Force Station (FAA: 37AK) | Big Mountain, Alaska, United States | UTC−09:00 | Mar-Nov |
| BMY | NWWC | Île Art – Waala Airport | Waala, Belep Islands, New Caledonia | UTC+11:00 | |
| BMZ | AYBF | Bamu Airport | Bamu, Papua New Guinea | UTC+10:00 | |
-BN-
| BNA | KBNA | Nashville International Airport | Nashville, Tennessee, United States | UTC−06:00 | Mar-Nov |
| BNB | FZGN | Boende Airport | Boende, Democratic Republic of the Congo | UTC+01:00 | |
| BNC | FZNP | Beni Airport | Beni, Democratic Republic of the Congo | UTC+02:00 | |
| BND | OIKB | Bandar Abbas International Airport | Bandar Abbas, Iran | UTC+03:30 | Mar-Sep |
| BNE | YBBN | Brisbane Airport | Brisbane, Queensland, Australia | UTC+10:00 | |
| BNF | | Warm Springs Bay Seaplane Base | Baranof Warm Springs, Alaska, United States | UTC−09:00 | Mar-Nov |
| BNG | KBNG | Banning Municipal Airport | Banning, California, United States | UTC−08:00 | Mar-Nov |
| BNI | DNBE | Benin Airport | Benin City, Nigeria | UTC+01:00 | |
| BNK | YBNA | Ballina Byron Gateway Airport | Ballina, New South Wales, Australia | UTC+10:00 | Oct-Apr |
| BNL | KBNL | Barnwell Regional Airport | Barnwell, South Carolina, United States | UTC−05:00 | Mar-Nov |
| BNM | AYBD | Bodinumu Airport | Bodinumu, Papua New Guinea | UTC+10:00 | |
| BNN | ENBN | Brønnøysund Airport, Brønnøy | Brønnøysund, Norway | UTC+01:00 | Mar-Oct |
| BNO | KBNO | Burns Municipal Airport | Burns, Oregon, United States | UTC−08:00 | Mar-Nov |
| BNP | OPBN | Bannu Airport | Bannu, Pakistan | UTC+05:00 | |
| BNQ | | Baganga Airport | Baganga, Philippines | UTC+08:00 | |
| BNR | DFOB | Banfora Airport | Banfora, Burkina Faso | UTC±00:00 | |
| BNS | SVBI | Barinas Airport | Barinas, Venezuela | UTC−04:00 | |
| BNT | AYDI | Bundi Airport | Bundi, Papua New Guinea | UTC+10:00 | |
| BNU | SSBL | Blumenau Airport | Blumenau, Santa Catarina, Brazil | UTC−03:00 | |
| BNV | | Boana Airport | Boana, Papua New Guinea | UTC+10:00 | |
| BNW | KBNW | Boone Municipal Airport | Boone, Iowa, United States | UTC−06:00 | Mar-Nov |
| BNX | LQBK | Banja Luka International Airport | Banja Luka, Bosnia and Herzegovina | UTC+01:00 | Mar-Oct |
| BNY | AGGB | Bellona/Anua Airport | Bellona Island, Rennell and Bellona, Solomon Islands | UTC+11:00 | |
| BNZ | | Banz Airport | Banz, Papua New Guinea | UTC+10:00 | |
-BO-
| BOA | FZAJ | Boma Airport | Boma, Democratic Republic of the Congo | UTC+01:00 | |
| BOB | NTTB | Bora Bora Airport (Motu Mute Airport) | Bora Bora, French Polynesia | UTC−10:00 | |
| BOC | MPBO | Bocas del Toro "Isla Colón" International Airport | Bocas Town, Panama | UTC−05:00 | |
| BOD | LFBD | Bordeaux–Mérignac Airport | Bordeaux, Aquitaine, France | UTC+01:00 | Mar-Oct |
| BOE | FCOB | Boundji Airport | Boundji, Republic of the Congo | UTC+01:00 | |
| BOG | SKBO | El Dorado International Airport | Bogotá, Colombia | UTC−05:00 | |
| BOH | EGHH | Bournemouth Airport | Bournemouth, England | UTC±00:00 | Mar-Oct |
| BOI | KBOI | Boise Air Terminal (Gowen Field) | Boise, Idaho, United States | UTC−07:00 | Mar-Nov |
| BOJ | LBBG | Burgas Airport | Burgas, Bulgaria | UTC+02:00 | Mar-Oct |
| BOK | KBOK | Brookings Airport | Brookings, Oregon, United States | UTC−08:00 | Mar-Nov |
| BOL | EGQB | Ballykelly Airfield (RAF Ballykelly) | Ballykelly, Northern Ireland | UTC±00:00 | Mar-Oct |
| BOM | VABB | Chhatrapati Shivaji International Airport | Mumbai, Maharashtra, India | UTC+05:30 | |
| BON | TNCB | Flamingo International Airport | Kralendijk, Bonaire, Caribbean Netherlands | UTC−04:00 | |
| BOO | ENBO | Bodø Airport | Bodø, Norway | UTC+01:00 | Mar-Oct |
| BOP | FEFO | Bouar Airport | Bouar, Central African Republic | UTC+01:00 | |
| BOQ | | Boku Airport | Boku, Papua New Guinea | UTC+11:00 | |
| BOR | VLBK | Bokeo International Airport | Bokeo Province, Laos | UTC+07:00 | |
| BOS | KBOS | Logan International Airport | Boston, Massachusetts, United States | UTC−05:00 | Mar-Nov |
| BOT | AYET | Bosset Airport | Bosset, Papua New Guinea | UTC+10:00 | |
| BOU | LFLD | Bourges Airport | Bourges, Centre-Val de Loire, France | UTC+01:00 | Mar-Oct |
| BOV | | Boang Island Airport | Boang Island, Papua New Guinea | UTC+10:00 | |
| BOW | KBOW | Bartow Municipal Airport | Bartow, Florida, United States | UTC−05:00 | Mar-Nov |
| BOX | YBRL | Borroloola Airport | Borroloola, Northern Territory, Australia | UTC+09:30 | |
| BOY | DFOO | Bobo Dioulasso Airport | Bobo-Dioulasso, Burkina Faso | UTC±00:00 | |
| BOZ | FEGZ | Bozoum Airport | Bozoum, Central African Republic | UTC+01:00 | |
-BP-
| BPB | | Boridi Airport | Boridi, Papua New Guinea | UTC+10:00 | |
| BPC | FKKV | Bamenda Airport | Bamenda, Cameroon | UTC+01:00 | |
| BPD | AYBP | Bapi Airport | Bapi, Papua New Guinea | UTC+10:00 | |
| BPE | ZBDH | Qinhuangdao Beidaihe Airport | Qinhuangdao, Hebei, China | UTC+08:00 | |
| BPF | AGBT | Batuna Airport | Batuna, Solomon Islands | UTC+11:00 | |
| BPG | SBBW | Barra do Garças Airport | Barra do Garças, Mato Grosso, Brazil | UTC−04:00 | |
| BPH | RPMF | Bislig Airport | Bislig, Philippines | UTC+08:00 | |
| BPI | KBPI | Miley Memorial Field | Big Piney, Wyoming, United States | UTC−07:00 | Mar-Nov |
| BPK | AYBQ | Biangabip Airport | Biangabip, Papua New Guinea | UTC+10:00 | |
| BPL | ZWBL | Bole Alashankou Airport | Bole, Xinjiang, China | UTC+06:00 | |
| BPM | VOHY | Begumpet Airport | Hyderabad, Telangana, India | UTC+05:30 | |
| BPN | WALL | Sultan Aji Muhammad Sulaiman Airport | Balikpapan, Indonesia | UTC+08:00 | |
| BPS | SBPS | Porto Seguro Airport | Porto Seguro, Bahia, Brazil | UTC−03:00 | |
| BPT | KBPT | Jack Brooks Regional Airport | Beaumont / Port Arthur, Texas, United States | UTC−06:00 | Mar-Nov |
| BPX | ZUBD | Qamdo Bamda Airport | Qamdo, Tibet Autonomous Region, China | UTC+06:00 | |
| BPY | FMNQ | Besalampy Airport | Besalampy, Madagascar | UTC+03:00 | |
-BQ-
| BQA | RPUR | Dr. Juan C. Angara Airport | Baler, Philippines | UTC+08:00 | |
| BQB | YBLN | Busselton Margaret River Airport | Busselton, Western Australia, Australia | UTC+08:00 | |
| BQE | GGBU | Bubaque Airport | Bubaque, Guinea-Bissau | UTC±00:00 | |
| BQG | UHNB | Bogorodskoye Airport | Bogorodskoye, Khabarovsk Krai, Russia | UTC+10:00 | |
| BQH | EGKB | London Biggin Hill Airport | London / Biggin Hill, England | UTC±00:00 | Mar-Oct |
| BQI | | Bagani Airport | Bagani, Namibia | UTC+01:00 | Sep-Apr |
| BQJ | | Batagay Airport | Batagay, Yakutia, Russia | UTC+10:00 | |
| BQK | KBQK | Brunswick Golden Isles Airport | Brunswick, Georgia, United States | UTC−05:00 | Mar-Nov |
| BQL | YBOU | Boulia Airport | Boulia, Queensland, Australia | UTC+10:00 | |
| BQN | TJBQ | Rafael Hernández Airport | Aguadilla, Puerto Rico, United States | UTC−04:00 | |
| BQO | DIBN | Tehini Airport | Bouna, Ivory Coast | UTC±00:00 | |
| BQQ | SNBX | Barra Airport | Barra, Bahia, Brazil | UTC−03:00 | |
| BQS | UHBB | Ignatyevo Airport | Blagoveshchensk, Amur Oblast, Russia | UTC+09:00 | |
| BQT | UMBB | Brest Airport | Brest, Belarus | UTC+03:00 | |
| BQU | TVSB | J. F. Mitchell Airport | Bequia, Saint Vincent and the Grenadines | UTC−04:00 | |
| BQV | | Bartlett Cove Seaplane Base | Bartlett Cove, Alaska, United States | UTC−09:00 | Mar-Nov |
| BQW | YBGO | Balgo Hill Airport | Balgo Hill, Western Australia, Australia | UTC+08:00 | |
-BR-
| BRA | SNBR | Barreiras Airport | Barreiras, Bahia, Brazil | UTC−03:00 | |
| BRB | SBRR | Barreirinhas Airport | Barreirinhas, Maranhão, Brazil | UTC−03:00 | |
| BRC | SAZS | San Carlos de Bariloche Airport | San Carlos de Bariloche, Río Negro, Argentina | UTC−03:00 | |
| BRD | KBRD | Brainerd Lakes Regional Airport | Brainerd, Minnesota, United States | UTC−06:00 | Mar-Nov |
| BRE | EDDW | Bremen Airport | Bremen, Bremen, Germany | UTC+01:00 | Mar-Oct |
| BRG | WAMO | Taman Bung Karno Airport | Siau Tagulandang Biaro Islands Regency, Indonesia | UTC+08:00 | |
| BRH | | Brahman Airport | Brahman, Papua New Guinea | UTC+10:00 | |
| BRI | LIBD | Bari Karol Wojtyła Airport | Bari, Apulia, Italy | UTC+01:00 | Mar-Oct |
| BRJ | | Bright Airport | Bright, Victoria, Australia | UTC+10:00 | Oct-Apr |
| BRK | YBKE | Bourke Airport | Bourke, New South Wales, Australia | UTC+10:00 | Oct-Apr |
| BRL | KBRL | Southeast Iowa Regional Airport | Burlington, Iowa, United States | UTC−06:00 | Mar-Nov |
| BRM | SVBM | Jacinto Lara International Airport | Barquisimeto, Venezuela | UTC−04:00 | |
| BRN | LSZB | Bern Airport | Bern, Switzerland | UTC+01:00 | Mar-Oct |
| BRO | KBRO | Brownsville/South Padre Island International Airport | Brownsville, Texas, United States | UTC−06:00 | Mar-Nov |
| BRP | AYBR | Biaru Airport | Biaru, Papua New Guinea | UTC+10:00 | |
| BRQ | LKTB | Brno-Tuřany Airport | Brno, Czech Republic | UTC+01:00 | Mar-Oct |
| BRR | EGPR | Barra Airport | Barra, Scotland | UTC±00:00 | Mar-Oct |
| BRS | EGGD | Bristol Airport | Bristol, England | UTC±00:00 | Mar-Oct |
| BRT | YBTI | Bathurst Island Airport | Bathurst Island, Northern Territory, Australia | UTC+09:30 | |
| BRU | EBBR | Brussels Airport (Zaventem Airport) | Brussels, Belgium | UTC+01:00 | Mar-Oct |
| BRV | EDWB | Bremerhaven Airport | Bremerhaven, Bremen, Germany | UTC+01:00 | Mar-Oct |
| BRW | PABR | Wiley Post–Will Rogers Memorial Airport | Barrow, Alaska, United States | UTC−09:00 | Mar-Nov |
| BRX | MDBH | María Montez International Airport | Barahona, Dominican Republic | UTC−04:00 | |
| BRY | KBRY | Samuels Field | Bardstown, Kentucky, United States | UTC−05:00 | Mar-Nov |
-BS-
| BSA | HCMF | Bender Qassim International Airport | Bosaso, Somalia | UTC+03:00 | |
| BSB | SBBR | Brasília International Airport (Presidente J. Kubitschek Int'l Airport) | Brasília, Distrito Federal, Brazil | UTC−03:00 | |
| BSC | SKBS | José Celestino Mutis Airport | Bahía Solano, Colombia | UTC−05:00 | |
| BSD | ZPBS | Baoshan Yunduan Airport | Baoshan, Yunnan, China | UTC+08:00 | |
| BSE | WBGN | Sematan Airport | Sematan, Sarawak, Malaysia | UTC+08:00 | |
| BSF | PHSF | Bradshaw Army Airfield | Camp Pohakuloa, Hawaii, United States | UTC−10:00 | |
| BSG | FGBT | Bata Airport | Bata, Equatorial Guinea | UTC+01:00 | |
| BSI | RPLE | Balesin Airport | Balesin Island, Quezon, Philippines | UTC+08:00 | |
| BSJ | YBNS | Bairnsdale Airport | Bairnsdale, Victoria (Australia)|Victoria, Australia | UTC+10:00 | Oct-Apr |
| BSK | DAUB | Biskra Airport | Biskra, Algeria | UTC+01:00 | |
| BSL | LFSB | EuroAirport Basel-Mulhouse-Freiburg | Basel, Switzerland | UTC+01:00 | Mar-Oct |
| BSM | OINJ | Bishe Kola Air Base | Amol, Iran | UTC+03:30 | Mar-Sep |
| BSN | FEFS | Bossangoa Airport | Bossangoa, Central African Republic | UTC+01:00 | |
| BSO | RPUO | Basco Airport | Basco, Philippines | UTC+08:00 | |
| BSP | AYBH | Bensbach Airport | Bensbach, Papua New Guinea | UTC+10:00 | |
| BSQ | | Bisbee Municipal Airport (FAA: P04) | Bisbee, Arizona, United States | UTC−07:00 | |
| BSR | ORMM | Basra International Airport | Basra, Iraq | UTC+03:00 | |
| BSS | SNBS | Balsas Airport | Balsas, Maranhão, Brazil | UTC−03:00 | |
| BST | OABT | Bost Airport | Lashkar Gah (Bost), Afghanistan | UTC+04:30 | |
| BSU | FZEN | Basankusu Airport | Basankusu, Democratic Republic of the Congo | UTC+01:00 | |
| BSV | | Besakoa Airport | Besakoa, Madagascar | UTC+03:00 | |
| BSW | | Boswell Bay Airport (FAA: AK97) | Boswell Bay, Alaska, United States | UTC−09:00 | Mar-Nov |
| BSX | VYPN | Pathein Airport | Pathein, Myanmar | UTC+06:30 | |
| BSY | HCMD | Bardera Airport | Bardera, Somalia | UTC+03:00 | |
| BSZ | UCFM | Manas International Airport | Bishkek, Kyrgyzstan | UTC+06:00 | |
-BT-
| BTA | FKKO | Bertoua Airport | Bertoua, Cameroon | UTC+01:00 | |
| BTB | FCOT | Bétou Airport | Bétou, Republic of the Congo | UTC+01:00 | |
| BTC | VCCB | Batticaloa International Airport | Batticaloa, Sri Lanka | UTC+05:30 | |
| BTD | | Brunette Downs Airport | Brunette Downs, Northern Territory, Australia | UTC+09:30 | |
| BTE | GFBN | Sherbro International Airport | Bonthe, Sierra Leone | UTC±00:00 | |
| BTF | KBTF | Skypark Airport | Bountiful, Utah, United States | UTC−07:00 | Mar-Nov |
| BTG | FEGF | Batangafo Airport | Batangafo, Central African Republic | UTC+01:00 | |
| BTH | WIDD | Hang Nadim Airport | Batam, Indonesia | UTC+07:00 | |
| BTI | PABA | Barter Island LRRS Airport | Barter Island, Alaska, United States | UTC−09:00 | Mar-Nov |
| BTJ | WITT | Sultan Iskandar Muda International Airport | Banda Aceh, Indonesia | UTC+07:00 | |
| BTK | UIBB | Bratsk Airport | Bratsk, Irkutsk Oblast, Russia | UTC+08:00 | |
| BTL | KBTL | W. K. Kellogg Airport | Battle Creek, Michigan, United States | UTC−05:00 | Mar-Nov |
| BTM | KBTM | Bert Mooney Airport | Butte, Montana, United States | UTC−07:00 | Mar-Nov |
| BTN | KBBP | Marlboro County Jetport (FAA: BBP) | Bennettsville, South Carolina, United States | UTC−05:00 | Mar-Nov |
| BTO | | Botopasi Airstrip | Botopasi, Suriname | UTC−03:00 | |
| BTP | KBTP | Butler County Airport (K.W. Scholter Field) | Butler, Pennsylvania, United States | UTC−05:00 | Mar-Nov |
| BTQ | HRYI | Butare Airport | Butare, Rwanda | UTC+02:00 | |
| BTR | KBTR | Baton Rouge Metropolitan Airport (Ryan Field) | Baton Rouge, Louisiana, United States | UTC−06:00 | Mar-Nov |
| BTS | LZIB | M. R. Štefánik Airport | Bratislava, Slovakia | UTC+01:00 | Mar-Oct |
| BTT | PABT | Bettles Airport | Bettles, Alaska, United States | UTC−09:00 | Mar-Nov |
| BTU | WBGB | Bintulu Airport | Bintulu, Sarawak, Malaysia | UTC+08:00 | |
| BTV | KBTV | Burlington International Airport | Burlington, Vermont, United States | UTC−05:00 | Mar-Nov |
| BTW | WAOC | Batu Licin Airport | Batu Licin, Indonesia | UTC+08:00 | |
| BTX | YBEO | Betoota Airport | Betoota, Queensland, Australia | UTC+10:00 | |
| BTY | KBTY | Beatty Airport | Beatty, Nevada, United States | UTC−08:00 | Mar-Nov |
| BTZ | VTSY | Betong Airport | Betong, Yala, Thailand | UTC+07:00 | |
-BU-
| BUA | AYBK | Buka Island Airport | Buka Island, Papua New Guinea | UTC+11:00 | |
| BUB | KBUB | Cram Field | Burwell, Nebraska, United States | UTC−06:00 | Mar-Nov |
| BUC | YBKT | Burketown Airport | Burketown, Queensland, Australia | UTC+10:00 | |
| BUD | LHBP | Budapest Ferenc Liszt International Airport | Budapest, Hungary | UTC+01:00 | Mar-Oct |
| BUE | | metropolitan area^{5} | Buenos Aires, Argentina | UTC−03:00 | |
| BUF | KBUF | Buffalo Niagara International Airport | Buffalo, New York, United States | UTC−05:00 | Mar-Nov |
| BUG | FNBG | Benguela Airport (Gen. V. Deslandes Airport) | Benguela, Angola | UTC+01:00 | |
| BUH | | Bucharest Baneasa^{6} | Bucharest, Romania | UTC+02:00 | Mar-Oct |
| BUI | WAJB | Bokondini Airport | Bokondini, Indonesia | UTC+09:00 | |
| BUJ | DAAD | Bou Saada Airport | Bou Saâda, Algeria | UTC+01:00 | |
| BUK | | Albuq Airport | Albuq, Yemen | UTC+03:00 | |
| BUL | AYBU | Bulolo Airport | Bulolo, Papua New Guinea | UTC+10:00 | |
| BUM | KBUM | Butler Memorial Airport | Butler, Missouri, United States | UTC−06:00 | Mar-Nov |
| BUN | SKBU | Gerardo Tobar López Airport | Buenaventura, Colombia | UTC−05:00 | |
| BUO | HCMV | Burao Airport | Burao, Somalia | UTC+03:00 | |
| BUP | VIBT | Bathinda Airport (Bhisiana Air Force Station) | Bathinda, Punjab, India | UTC+05:30 | |
| BUQ | FVBU | Joshua Mqabuko Nkomo International Airport | Bulawayo, Zimbabwe | UTC+02:00 | |
| BUR | KBUR | Bob Hope Airport | Burbank, California, United States | UTC−08:00 | Mar-Nov |
| BUS | UGSB | Batumi International Airport (Alexander Kartveli Batumi Int'l Airport) | Batumi, Georgia | UTC+04:00 | |
| BUT | VQBT | Bathpalathang Airport | Jakar, Bhutan | UTC+06:00 | |
| BUU | WIPI | Muara Bungo Airport | Bungo Regency, Jambi, Indonesia | UTC+07:00 | |
| BUV | SUBU | Placeres Airport | Bella Unión, Uruguay | UTC−03:00 | |
| BUW | WAWB | Betoambari Airport | Baubau, Indonesia | UTC+08:00 | |
| BUX | FZKA | Bunia Airport | Bunia, Democratic Republic of the Congo | UTC+02:00 | |
| BUY | YBUN | Bunbury Airport | Bunbury, Western Australia, Australia | UTC+08:00 | |
| BUZ | OIBB | Bushehr Airport | Bushehr, Iran | UTC+03:30 | Mar-Sep |
-BV-
| BVA | LFOB | Beauvais–Tillé Airport | Beauvais, Picardy, France | UTC+01:00 | Mar-Oct |
| BVB | SBBV | Boa Vista International Airport | Boa Vista, Roraima, Brazil | UTC−04:00 | |
| BVC | GVBA | Aristides Pereira International Airport (Rabil Airport) | Boa Vista, Cape Verde | UTC−01:00 | |
| BVE | LFSL | Brive–Souillac Airport | Brive-la-Gaillarde, Limousin, France | UTC+01:00 | Mar-Oct |
| BVF | NFNU | Dama Airport | Bua, Fiji | UTC+12:00 | Nov-Jan |
| BVG | ENBV | Berlevåg Airport | Berlevåg, Norway | UTC+01:00 | Mar-Oct |
| BVH | SBVH | Vilhena Airport (Brigadeiro Camarão Airport) | Vilhena, Rondônia, Brazil | UTC−04:00 | |
| BVI | YBDV | Birdsville Airport | Birdsville, Queensland, Australia | UTC+10:00 | |
| BVJ | USDB | Bovanenkovo Airport | Bovanenkovo gas field, Yamalo-Nenets Autonomous Okrug, Russia | UTC+05:00 | |
| BVK | SLHJ | Huacaraje Airport | Huacaraje, Bolivia | UTC−04:00 | |
| BVL | SLBU | Baures Airport | Baures, Bolivia | UTC−04:00 | |
| BVM | SD6P | Belmonte Airport | Belmonte, Bahia, Brazil | UTC−03:00 | |
| BVO | KBVO | Bartlesville Municipal Airport | Bartlesville, Oklahoma, United States | UTC−06:00 | Mar-Nov |
| BVP | | Bolovip Airport | Bolovip, Papua New Guinea | UTC+10:00 | |
| BVR | GVBR | Esperadinha Airport | Brava, Cape Verde | UTC−01:00 | |
| BVS | SNVS | Breves Airport | Breves, Pará, Brazil | UTC−03:00 | |
| BVU | PABG | Beluga Airport (FAA: BLG) | Beluga, Alaska, United States | UTC−09:00 | Mar-Nov |
| BVV | UHSB | Burevestnik Airport | Burevestnik, Sakhalin Oblast, Russia | UTC+11:00 | |
| BVW | | Batavia Downs Airport | Batavia Downs, Queensland, Australia | UTC+10:00 | |
| BVX | KBVX | Batesville Regional Airport | Batesville, Arkansas, United States | UTC−06:00 | Mar-Nov |
| BVY | KBVY | Beverly Municipal Airport | Beverly, Massachusetts, United States | UTC−05:00 | Mar-Nov |
| BVZ | YBYS | Beverley Springs Airport | Beverley Springs, Western Australia, Australia | UTC+08:00 | |
-BW-
| BWA | VNBW | Gautam Buddha Airport | Siddharthanagar (Bhairawa), Nepal | UTC+05:45 | |
| BWB | YBWX | Barrow Island Airport | Barrow Island, Western Australia, Australia | UTC+08:00 | |
| BWC | KBWC | Brawley Municipal Airport | Brawley, California, United States | UTC−08:00 | Mar-Nov |
| BWD | KBWD | Brownwood Regional Airport | Brownwood, Texas, United States | UTC−06:00 | Mar-Nov |
| BWE | EDVE | Braunschweig–Wolfsburg Airport | Braunschweig, Lower Saxony, Germany | UTC+01:00 | Mar-Oct |
| BWF | EGNL | Barrow/Walney Island Airport | Barrow-in-Furness, England | UTC±00:00 | Mar-Oct |
| BWG | KBWG | Bowling Green-Warren County Regional Airport | Bowling Green, Kentucky, United States | UTC−06:00 | Mar-Nov |
| BWH | WMKB | RMAF Butterworth | Butterworth, Penang, Malaysia | UTC+08:00 | |
| BWI | KBWI | Baltimore/Washington International Thurgood Marshall Airport | Baltimore–Washington metropolitan area, United States | UTC−05:00 | Mar-Nov |
| BWJ | | Bawan Airport | Bawan, Papua New Guinea | UTC+10:00 | |
| BWK | LDSB | Bol Airport (Brač Airport) | Bol, Croatia | UTC+01:00 | Mar-Oct |
| BWL | KBKN | Blackwell–Tonkawa Municipal Airport (FAA: BKN) | Blackwell, Oklahoma, United States | UTC−06:00 | Mar-Nov |
| BWM | KBPP | Bowman Municipal Airport (FAA: BPP) | Bowman, North Dakota, United States | UTC−07:00 | Mar-Nov |
| BWN | WBSB | Brunei International Airport | Bandar Seri Begawan, Brunei | UTC+08:00 | |
| BWO | UWSB | Balakovo Airport | Balakovo, Saratov Oblast, Russia | UTC+04:00 | |
| BWP | AYBI | Bewani Airport | Bewani, Papua New Guinea | UTC+10:00 | |
| BWQ | YBRW | Brewarrina Airport | Brewarrina, New South Wales, Australia | UTC+10:00 | Oct-Apr |
| BWT | YWYY | Burnie Airport | Burnie, Tasmania, Australia | UTC+10:00 | Oct-Apr |
| BWU | YSBK | Bankstown Airport | Bankstown, New South Wales, Australia | UTC+10:00 | Oct-Apr |
| BWW | MUBR | Las Brujas Airport | Cayo Santa María, Cuba | UTC−05:00 | Mar-Nov |
| BWX | WADY | Banyuwangi Airport | Banyuwangi, Indonesia | UTC+07:00 | |
| BWY | EGVJ | RAF Bentwaters | Woodbridge, England | UTC±00:00 | Mar-Oct |
-BX-
| BXA | KBXA | George R. Carr Memorial Air Field | Bogalusa, Louisiana, United States | UTC−06:00 | Mar-Nov |
| BXB | WASO | Babo Airport | Babo, Indonesia | UTC+09:00 | |
| BXD | WAKE | Bade Airport | Bade, Indonesia | UTC+09:00 | |
| BXE | GOTB | Bakel Airport | Bakel, Senegal | UTC±00:00 | |
| BXF | YBEB | Bellburn Airstrip | Bellburn Camps, Western Australia, Australia | UTC+08:00 | |
| BXG | YBDG | Bendigo Airport | Bendigo, Victoria (Australia)|Victoria, Australia | UTC+10:00 | Oct-Apr |
| BXH | UAAH | Balkhash Airport | Balkhash, Kazakhstan | UTC+06:00 | |
| BXI | DIBI | Boundiali Airport | Boundiali, Ivory Coast | UTC±00:00 | |
| BXJ | UAAR | Boraldai Airport | Almaty, Kazakhstan | UTC+06:00 | |
| BXK | KBXK | Buckeye Municipal Airport | Buckeye, Arizona, United States | UTC−07:00 | |
| BXL | | Blue Lagoon Seaplane Base | Nanuya Lailai, Fiji | UTC+12:00 | Nov-Jan |
| BXM | | Batom Airport | Batom, Indonesia | UTC+09:00 | |
| BXN | LTBV | Bodrum-Imsik Airport | Bodrum, Turkey | UTC+03:00 | |
| BXO | LSZC | Buochs Airport | Buochs, Switzerland | UTC+01:00 | Mar-Oct |
| BXP | EPBP | Biała Podlaska Airport | Biała Podlaska, Poland | UTC+01:00 | Mar-Oct |
| BXR | OIKM | Bam Airport | Bam, Iran | UTC+03:30 | Mar-Sep |
| BXS | | Borrego Valley Airport (FAA: L08) | Borrego Springs, California, United States | UTC−08:00 | Mar-Nov |
| BXT | WRLC | PT Badak Bontang Airport | Bontang, Indonesia | UTC+08:00 | |
| BXU | RPME | Bancasi Airport | Butuan, Philippines | UTC+08:00 | |
| BXV | BIBV | Breiðdalsvík Airport | Breiðdalsvík, Iceland | UTC±00:00 | |
| BXW | WARW | Bawean Airport | Bawean, East Java, Indonesia | UTC+08:00 | |
| BXX | | Borama Airport | Borama, Somalia | UTC+03:00 | |
| BXY | UAOL | Krayniy Airport | Baikonur, Kazakhstan | UTC+06:00 | |
| BXZ | AYNS | Bunsil Airport | Bunsil, Papua New Guinea | UTC+10:00 | |
-BY-
| BYA | | Boundary Airport | Boundary, Alaska, United States | UTC−09:00 | Mar-Nov |
| BYB | | Dibba Airport | Dibba Al-Baya, Oman | UTC+04:00 | |
| BYC | SLYA | Yacuiba Airport | Yacuíba, Bolivia | UTC−04:00 | |
| BYD | OYBI | Al Bayda Airport | Al Bayda, Yemen | UTC+03:00 | |
| BYF | LFAQ | Albert – Picardie Airport | Albert, Picardy, France | UTC+01:00 | Mar-Oct |
| BYG | KBYG | Johnson County Airport | Buffalo, Wyoming, United States | UTC−07:00 | Mar-Nov |
| BYH | KBYH | Arkansas International Airport | Blytheville, Arkansas, United States | UTC−06:00 | Mar-Nov |
| BYI | KBYI | Burley Municipal Airport | Burley, Idaho, United States | UTC−07:00 | Mar-Nov |
| BYJ | LPBJ | Beja Airport | Beja, Portugal | UTC±00:00 | Mar-Oct |
| BYK | DIBK | Bouaké Airport | Bouaké, Ivory Coast | UTC±00:00 | |
| BYL | | Bella Yella Airport | Bella Yella, Liberia | UTC±00:00 | |
| BYM | MUBY | Carlos Manuel de Céspedes Airport | Bayamo, Cuba | UTC−05:00 | Mar-Nov |
| BYN | ZMBH | Bayankhongor Airport | Bayankhongor, Mongolia | UTC+08:00 | |
| BYO | SBDB | Bonito Airport | Bonito, Mato Grosso do Sul, Brazil | UTC−03:00 | |
| BYP | YBRY | Barimunya Airport | Barimunya, Western Australia, Australia | UTC+08:00 | |
| BYQ | WALV | Bunyu Airport | Bunyu, Indonesia | UTC+08:00 | |
| BYR | EKLS | Læsø Airport | Læsø, Denmark | UTC+01:00 | Mar-Oct |
| BYS | KBYS | Bicycle Lake Army Airfield (Fort Irwin) | Barstow, California, United States | UTC−08:00 | Mar-Nov |
| BYT | EIBN | Bantry Aerodrome | Bantry, Ireland | UTC±00:00 | Mar-Oct |
| BYU | EDQD | Bindlacher Berg Airport | Bayreuth, Bavaria, Germany | UTC+01:00 | Mar-Oct |
| BYV | | Beira Lake Seaplane Base | Colombo, Sri Lanka | UTC+05:30 | |
| BYW | | Blakely Island Airport (FAA: 38WA) | Blakely Island, Washington, United States | UTC−08:00 | Mar-Nov |
| BYX | | Baniyala Airport | Baniyala, Northern Territory, Australia | UTC+09:30 | |
-BZ-
| BZA | MNBZ | San Pedro Airport | Bonanza, Nicaragua | UTC−06:00 | |
| BZB | | Bazaruto Island Airport | Bazaruto Island, Mozambique | UTC+02:00 | |
| BZC | SBBZ | Umberto Modiano Airport | Armação dos Búzios, Rio de Janeiro, Brazil | UTC−03:00 | |
| BZD | YBRN | Balranald Airport | Balranald, New South Wales, Australia | UTC+10:00 | Oct-Apr |
| BZE | MZBZ | Philip S. W. Goldson International Airport | Belize City, Belize | UTC−06:00 | |
| BZF | | Benton Field | Redding, California, United States | UTC−08:00 | Mar-Nov |
| BZG | EPBY | Bydgoszcz Ignacy Jan Paderewski Airport | Bydgoszcz, Poland | UTC+01:00 | Mar-Oct |
| BZH | | Bumi Hills Airstrip | Bumi Hills, Zimbabwe | UTC+02:00 | |
| BZI | LTBF | Balıkesir Airport (Merkez Airport) | Balıkesir, Turkey | UTC+03:00 | |
| BZJ | ZSBO | Bozhou Airport | Bozhou, Anhui, China | UTC+08:00 | |
| BZK | UUBP | Bryansk International Airport | Bryansk, Bryansk Oblast, Russia | UTC+03:00 | |
| BZL | VGBR | Barisal Airport | Barisal, Bangladesh | UTC+06:00 | |
| BZM | | Bemolanga Airport | Bemolanga, Madagascar | UTC+03:00 | |
| BZN | KBZN | Bozeman Yellowstone International Airport (Gallatin Field) | Bozeman, Montana, United States | UTC−07:00 | Mar-Nov |
| BZO | LIPB | Bolzano Airport | Bolzano, Trentino-Alto Adige/Südtirol, Italy | UTC+01:00 | Mar-Oct |
| BZP | | Bizant Airport | Bizant, Queensland, Australia | UTC+10:00 | |
| BZR | LFMU | Béziers Cap d'Agde Airport | Béziers, Languedoc-Roussillon, France | UTC+01:00 | Mar-Oct |
| BZT | | Eagle Air Park | Brazoria, Texas, United States | UTC−06:00 | Mar-Nov |
| BZU | FZKJ | Buta Zega Airport | Buta, Democratic Republic of the Congo | UTC+02:00 | |
| BZV | FCBB | Maya-Maya Airport | Brazzaville, Republic of the Congo | UTC+01:00 | |
| BZX | | Bazhong Enyang Airport | Bazhong, Sichuan, China | UTC+08:00 | |
| BZY | LUBL | Bălți International Airport | Bălți, Moldova | UTC+02:00 | Mar-Oct |
| BZZ | EGVN | RAF Brize Norton | Carterton, England | UTC±00:00 | Mar-Oct |

== Notes ==
- ^1 Morocco temporarily suspends DST for the month of Ramadan.
- ^2 BAK is common IATA code for Heydar Aliyev International Airport (IATA: GYD) and Zabrat Airport (IATA: ZXT).
- ^3 BHZ is common IATA code for Tancredo Neves International Airport (IATA: CNF) and Belo Horizonte/Pampulha – Carlos Drummond de Andrade Airport (IATA: PLU).
- ^4 BJS is common IATA code for Beijing Capital International Airport (IATA: PEK), Beijing Nanyuan Airport (IATA: NAY) and Beijing Daxing International Airport (IATA: PKX).
- ^5 BUE is common IATA code for Ministro Pistarini International Airport (IATA: EZE) and Jorge Newbery Airfield (IATA: AEP).
- ^6 BUH is common IATA code for Henri Coandă International Airport (IATA: OTP) and Aurel Vlaicu International Airport (IATA: BBU).
