= List of airports in Somaliland =

This is a List of airports in Somaliland, sorted by location.

| Location | ICAO | IATA | Airport name |
Civil airports
| Berbera | HCMI | BBO | Berbera Airport |
| Borama | HCBM | BXX | Borama Airport |
| Burao | HCMV | BUO | Burao Airport |
| Erigavo | HCMU | ERA | Erigavo Airport |
| Hargeisa | HCMH | HGA | Egal International Airport |
| Kalabaidh | none | HCKB | Kalabaidh Airport |

== See also ==
- List of airports by ICAO code: H#HC - Somalia
