= Somaliland Quality Control Commission =

Somaliland Quality Control Commission SQCC
- Hay'adda Dhawrista Tayada Somaliland
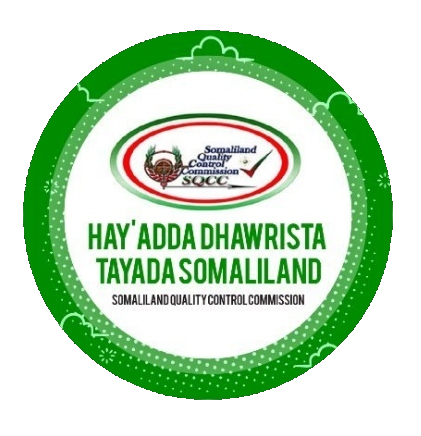

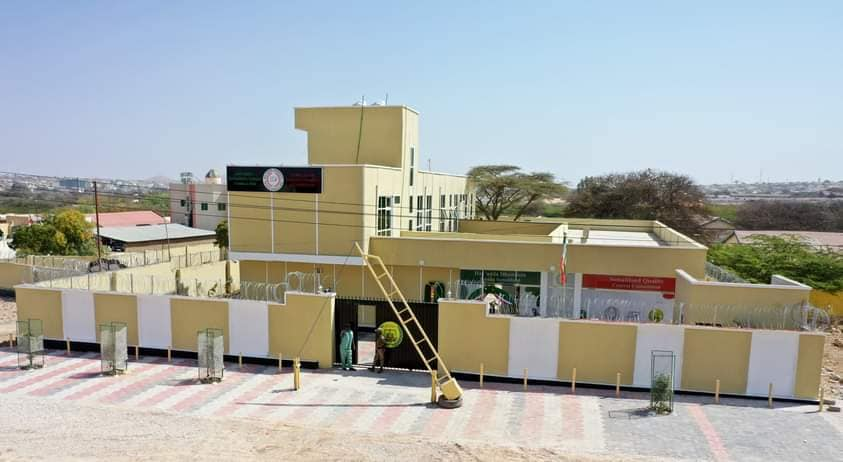

Agency overview
- Formed: 2010
- Headquarters: Hargeisa, Somaliland
- Agency executive: Abdiwasac Mahamed Yusuf, Chairman
- Website: somalilandqualitycc.com

Footnotes
- Somaliland Quality Control Commission on Facebook Somaliland Quality Control Commission on X

The Somaliland Quality Control Commission (SQCC) is a Somaliland government agency, responsible for the standardization, Measurement and conformity assessment services in Somaliland. The head of the commission is the chairman, and is nominated by the President, and then approved by the Parliament, the current chairman is Abdiwasac mahamed Yusuf.

== See also ==
- Politics of Somaliland
- Good Governance and Anti-Corruption Commission
- Somaliland Civil Service Commission
- Somaliland Civil Aviation and Airports Authority
