= Burao Airport =

Airport in Somaliland

- IATA: BUO; ICAO: HCMV

Summary
- Owner: Somaliland Civil Aviation and Airports Authority
- Serves: Burao, Somaliland
- Elevation AMSL: 3,400 ft / 1,100 m
- Coordinates: 09°31′00″N 45°34′00″E

Map
- Location of airport in Somaliland BUO (Somaliland)

Runways
Direction	Length		Surface
Direction	ft	m	Surface
04/22	7,875	2,556	Dirt

Burao Airport (IATA: BUO, ICAO: HCMV) is an airport in Burao, Somaliland. It is situated less than one kilometre north-east from the New Bridge at the City Center. As of 2012, the airport's facilities are undergoing major renovations, supervised by the ICAO.

Somaliland made in 2024 Somaliland airlines as the national carrier funded and created by the Somaliland government, with likely plane orders of Boeing 777 and Airbus A330 with only light planes only to train pilots, Somaliland airlines plans to be the national carrier with links to Eastern Africa and Middle East.

== See also ==
- Egal International Airport
- Berbera Airport
- Erigavo Airport
- Borama Airport
- List of airports in Somaliland
- Ministry of Civil Aviation (Somaliland)
