= BXN =

BXN may refer to:

- Bauxite and Northern Railway, a Class III railroad operating in the United States state of Arkansas
- Burduna language of Australia, SIL International language code BXN
- Bodrum-Imsik Airport, Akarca, Turkey, IATA airport code BXN
