= BCW =

BCW or bcw may refer to:

- Border City Wrestling, a Canadian independent professional wrestling promotion
- British Championship Wrestling, a Scottish independent professional wrestling promotion
- Burson Cohn & Wolfe, an American multinational public relations and communications firm
- BCW, the IATA code for Benguerra Island Airport, Mozambique
- bcw, the ISO 639-3 code for Bana language, Cameroon
