= BGQ =

BGQ or bgq may refer to:

- BGQ, the IATA and FAA LID code for Big Lake Airport, Alaska, United States
- bgq, the ISO 639-3 code for Bagri language, India and Pakistan
