= BXX =

BXX may refer to:

- BXX (airport), an airport in Boorama, Somaliland
- ISO 639:bxx, a spurious language
- BXX, a 2024 EP by South Korean girl group Purple Kiss
