= BQQ =

BQQ or bqq may refer to:

- BQQ, the IATA code for Barra Airport (Brazil), Brazil
- bqq, the ISO 639-3 code for Biritai language, Indonesia
