= BXV =

BXV can refer to:

- Beraku language, an extinct language from Chad
- Breiðdalsvík Airport, an airport in Breiðdalsvík, Iceland
- Leptonetidae, a family of small, primitive spiders
