= Civil Service Institute =

Institute in Hargeisa, Somaliland

- Machadka Shaqaalaha Dawladda
- Other names: معهد الخدمة المدنية
- Type: Public
- Established: September 21, 2005; 20 years ago
- President: Omer Eid Qalonb
- Location: Hargeisa, Maroodi Jeex, Republic of Somaliland
- Colors: Blue and White
- Website: Official Website

The Civil Service Institute (Somali: Machadka Shaqaalaha Dawladda, Arabic: معهد الخدمة المدنية, CSI) is a public institute located in Hargeisa, the capital of Somaliland. The institution was founded in 2005. The current president of the institute is Omer Eid Qalonbi. The institute was primarily aimed to develop and improve the capacity of public institutions and to discharge an effective and equitable public service delivery to the public.

== See also ==
- Somaliland Civil Service Commission
- University of Hargeisa
