= BUO =

BUO is the IATA code of Burao Airport in Somaliland.

buo is the ISO 639 code of the Terei language of Papua New Guinea.

== See also ==
- Ilario Di Buò (1965-), an archer from Italy
