= National Displacement and Refugee Agency =

2017 Somaliland Government agency for helping immigrants

Republic of Somaliland National Displacement and Refugee Agency
- Coat of arms of Somaliland

Agency overview
- Formed: 2017
- Jurisdiction: Republic of Somaliland
- Headquarters: Hargeisa, Maroodi Jeh
- Agency executive: Abdikarim Ahmed Mohamed, Chairman
- Website: somalilandndra.com

The National Displacement and Refugee Agency (NDRA) (Somali: Hay'adda Qoxoontiga Iyo Barakacayaasha Qaranka) is a Somaliland government agency established in 2017 by President Muse Bihi Abdi, it is responsible to protect and assist refugees, asylum seekers, migrants and as well as returnees from abroad. The Manager who serves as the head of the NDRA, is appointed by the President. The current Manager is Abdikarim Ahmed Mohamed.

== See also ==
- Somaliland Quality Control Commission
- Politics of Somaliland
- State Printing Agency
