= Farxaan Aadan Haybe =

Somaliland politician

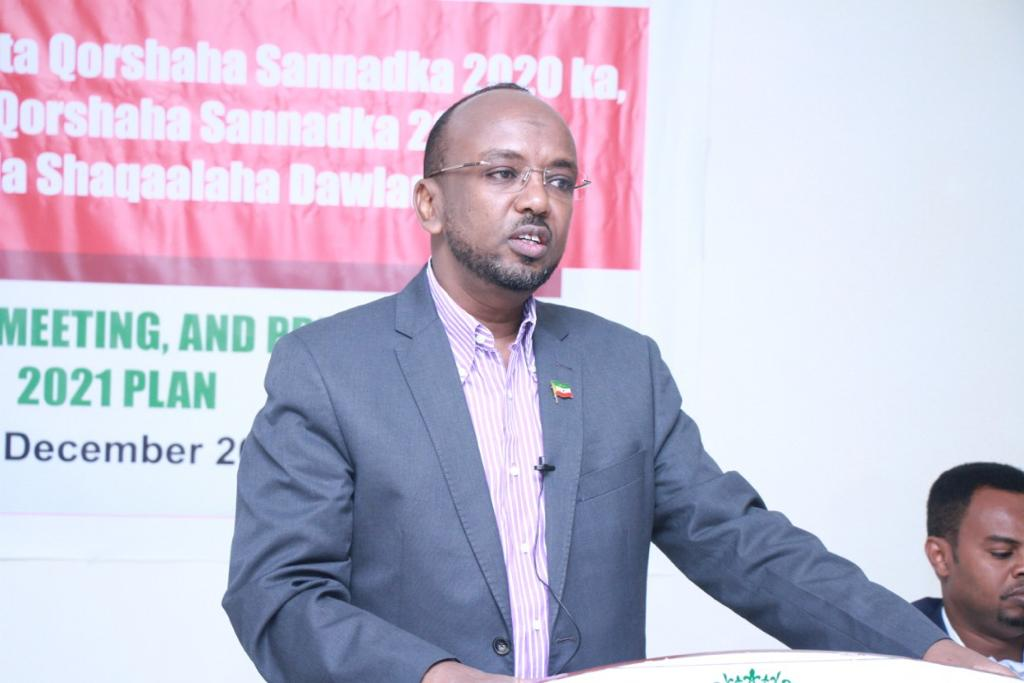
Farxaan Aadan Haybe

Farxaan Aadan Haybe is the chairman of the Somaliland Civil Service Commission, appointed in March 2019. He was formerly Minister of Aviation.
