= Good Governance and Anti-Corruption Commission =

Republic of Somaliland Good Governance and Anti-Corruption Commission
- Komishanka Maamul-Wanaagga iyo La dagaallanka Musuqmaasuqa (GGACC)
- Coat of arms of Somaliland

Agency overview
- Formed: August 26, 2010
- Jurisdiction: Somaliland
- Headquarters: Hargeisa, Maroodi Jeh (Somaliland)
- Agency executives: Dayib Adan Haji Ali, Chairman; Liban Ismail Abdillahi, Vice Chairman
- Website: www.somalilandggacc.com

The Good Governance and Anti-Corruption Commission of Somaliland abbreviated as GGACC (Somali: Komishanka Maamul-Wanaagga iyo La dagaallanka Musuqmaasuqa Somaliland) (Arabic: لجنة الحكم الرشيد ومكافحة الفساد) is a Somaliland government agency charged to combat corruption practices and to advice and ascertain a good governance system in Somaliland. The current head of the agency is Dayib Adan Haji Ali.

== Overview ==
The GGACC consists of five member committee and was established on 26 August 2010 by the Somaliland's president at the time Ahmed Mohamed Mohamoud by presidential decree, and was approved by the Parliament of Somaliland on 6 November 2012. The chairman and the vice chairman shall be elected by the members of the commission and will be approved by the majority of the members.

== See also ==
- Civil Service Commission (Somaliland)
- National Electoral Commission (Somaliland)
- Politics of Somaliland
