= Stefán Einarsson =

Icelandic linguist and literary historian (1897–1972)

Stefán Einarsson (9 June 1897 – 9 April 1972) was an Icelandic linguist and literary historian, who was a professor at Johns Hopkins University in Baltimore in the United States.

== Life and career ==
Stefán was born and raised on the farm of Höskuldsstaðir in Breiðdalur. His parents were Einar Gunnlaugsson and his wife Margrét Jónsdóttir. After attending school in Akureyri and graduating in 1917 from the Menntaskólinn in Reykjavík, he attended the University of Iceland and completed a master's degree in Icelandic in 1923–24; while a student, he assisted Sigfús Blöndal and Jón Ófeigsson on the Icelandic dictionary for four years. He then studied phonetics at the University of Helsinki in 1924–25 and at the University of Cambridge and completed his PhD at the University of Oslo with a dissertation on the phonetics of Icelandic.

He became a faculty member at Johns Hopkins the same year, 1927, at the invitation of Kemp Malone, for whom he had recorded a study text in Icelandic, and worked there until his retirement in 1962. He taught primarily in the English department, in the fields of Old Norse and Old English, and beginning in 1945, Scandinavian literature. He became Professor of Scandinavian Philology in 1945. He remained loyal to Iceland, accepting all invitations to contribute articles about Iceland to reference works and becoming one of the founding officers of the Icelandic Patriotic Society, for whose journal he wrote at least one article a year. He edited Heimskringla, the Icelandic newspaper published in Winnipeg. In 1942 he was appointed Icelandic vice-consul in Baltimore; from 1952 to 1962, when he retired from Johns Hopkins, he served as consul. After retirement he moved back to Iceland and lived in Reykjavík until his death (in Hrafnista nursing home); he was awarded a Guggenheim fellowship for 1962–63.

He played violin and piano and drew and painted well; several of his works include illustrations by him. He was married twice. His first wife, Margarethe Schwarzenberg (26 May 1892 – 7 January 1953), was an Estonian historian. They had no children. Her ashes are buried with his at the family farm. His second wife, whom he married in December 1954, was Ingibjörg Árnadóttir (1896–1980), from Njarðvík, a relative of Halldór Hermannsson, the librarian of the Fiske Icelandic collection at Cornell University. She had four children from a previous marriage.

== Publications ==
Stefán Einarsson published prolifically, over 500 books and articles in all. In addition to books and articles on linguistic and literary topics, in English he published a grammar of the Icelandic language (which grew out of a wartime Armed Forces course and contains a valuable glossary of Modern Icelandic words) and two histories of Icelandic literature, one of the first treatments of modern Icelandic literature and the other the first survey spanning the entire national literature from the settlement to the contemporary period, including émigré literature. He was the first Icelander to take a structuralist approach to Icelandic phonetics, and an early explorer of the idea of a link between skaldic and Latin meter. In Icelandic, in addition to two further books on Icelandic literature, one of them an expansion of his general survey published in English, he also co-edited and wrote a large part of a book on the history of his native Breiðdalur and was responsible for two of the annuals of the Ferðafélag Íslands, covering Eastern Region. His publications show three areas of emphasis: Icelandic language and culture as revealed in literature; the East Fjords; and great living Icelanders, particularly Sigurður Nordal, with whom he studied, Þórbergur Þórðarson, and Halldór Laxness. Early in his career, at Sigurður's urging, he wrote a biography of Eiríkr Magnússon, who was his maternal great uncle. However, he ranged extremely widely in his reviews, "from Medieval Latin to Strindberg and Icelandic telephone directories."

He was also on the editorial boards of the Journal of English and Germanic Philology, Modern Language Notes, and Scandinavian Studies (and Notes).

== Honors ==
Stefán was an honorary member of numerous learned societies, including the American Philosophical Society, to which he was only the second Icelander to be elected. He was awarded the Knight's Cross of the Order of the Falcon, Iceland's highest honour, in 1939, and in 1962 received an honorary doctorate from the University of Iceland.

There is a room dedicated to his work at the Breiðdalur Institute in Breiðdalsvík.

== Selected works ==
=== In English ===
- Icelandic: Grammar, Texts, Glossary. Baltimore: Johns Hopkins, 1945. OCLC 43095499. 2nd ed. repr. 2000. ISBN 9780801863578
- History of Icelandic Prose Writers, 1800–1940. Islandica 32–33. Ithaca, New York: Cornell University, 1948. OCLC 1465586
- A History of Icelandic Literature. The American-Scandinavian Foundation. New York: Johns Hopkins, 1957. OCLC 296324 3rd printing 1969. ISBN 9780801801860

=== In Icelandic ===
- Skáldaþing. Reykjavík: G. Ó. Guðjonsson, 1948. OCLC 2076523
- Islensk bókmenntasaga, 874–1960. Reykjavík: S. Jónsson, [1961]. OCLC 2050896
- with Jón Helgason, ed. and contributor. Breiðdæla: drög til sögu Breiðdals. Reykjavik, 1948. OCLC 2915592
- Austfirðir sunnan Gerpis. Árbók Ferðafélags Islands. [Reykjavík]: Ferðafélag Íslands, 1955. OCLC 256958732
- with Tómas Tryggvason. Austfirðir norðan Gerpis. Árbók Ferðafélags Islands. [Reykjavík]: Ferðafélag Íslands, 1957. OCLC 55778776
- Austfirzk skáld og rithöfundar. Austurland safn austfirzkra fræða 6. [Reykjavík]: Bókaforlag Odds Björnssonar, 1964. OCLC 1806111
