= Barra, Bahia =

Municipality of Bahia, Brazil

Barra Município de Barra
- Municipality
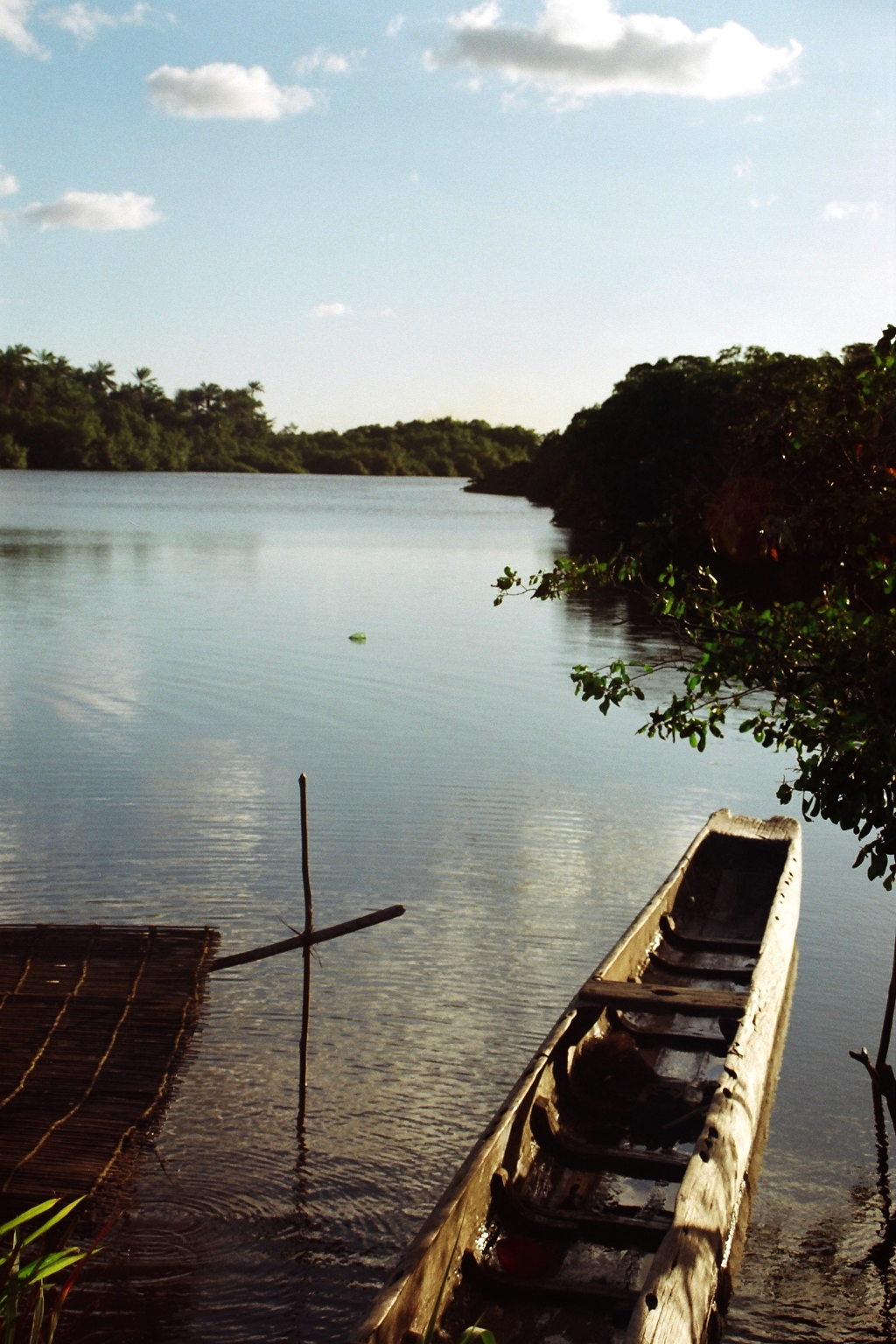
- Barra Grande, Barra, Bahia

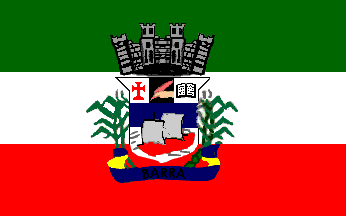
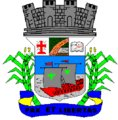
- Flag Coat of arms

- Location of Barra in Bahia

- Location of Barra in the Brazil
- Coordinates: 11°05′20″S 43°08′31″W
- Country: Brazil
- Region: Northeast
- State: Bahia
- Founded: August 23, 1753

Government
  - Mayor: Artur da Silva Filho

Area
  - Total: 11,422.537 km^{2} (4,410.266 sq mi)

Population (2020)
  - Total: 53,910
  - Density: 4.720/km^{2} (12.22/sq mi)
- Demonym: barrense
- Time zone: UTC−3 (BRT)
- Website: www.barra.ba.gov.br

Barra is a municipality in Bahia, Brazil. Barra covers 11,422.537 km^{2} (4,410.266 mi^{2}), and has a population of 53,910 with a population density of 4.3 inhabitants per square kilometer.

Barra was originally settled by Xakriabá people who lived along the Rio São Francisco. A corral of Casa da Torre of Dias D’Ávila was established in the ravines of the Rio Grande (Bahia) in 1670 at the junction of the Rio Grande and São Francisco. The Franciscans built a chapel in 1680 and it became locally known as São Francisco das Chagas da Barra do Rio Grande do Sul. This settlement became the Vila de São Francisco do Rio Grande do Sul in 1752. The name was simplified in 1873 to Barra do Rio Grande, and again in 1931 to Barra.

Barra was one of the most prosperous cities in the state of Bahia due to commercial traffic along the Rio São Francisco. Roadways were built into the interior of Bahia in the 1970s and Barra lost its importance to inland water transportation. Additionally, the highway system did not extend to Barra. The municipality fell into decline and many residents left to look for work elsewhere. Barra was ultimately connected by highway to other areas of Bahia in 1998.

The municipality is served by Barra Airport.

== Climate ==
Climate data for Barra (1981–2010)
Month	Jan	Feb	Mar	Apr	May	Jun	Jul	Aug	Sep	Oct	Nov	Dec	Year
Mean daily maximum °C (°F)	33.1 (91.6)	33.2 (91.8)	32.6 (90.7)	32.7 (90.9)	32.6 (90.7)	32.2 (90.0)	32.3 (90.1)	33.2 (91.8)	34.8 (94.6)	35.4 (95.7)	34.2 (93.6)	33.2 (91.8)	33.3 (91.9)
Daily mean °C (°F)	26.8 (80.2)	26.9 (80.4)	26.5 (79.7)	26.4 (79.5)	25.8 (78.4)	24.8 (76.6)	24.6 (76.3)	25.5 (77.9)	27.5 (81.5)	28.6 (83.5)	27.7 (81.9)	26.9 (80.4)	26.5 (79.7)
Mean daily minimum °C (°F)	21.2 (70.2)	21.5 (70.7)	21.3 (70.3)	20.7 (69.3)	19.3 (66.7)	17.4 (63.3)	16.7 (62.1)	17.7 (63.9)	20.2 (68.4)	22.2 (72.0)	21.9 (71.4)	21.4 (70.5)	20.1 (68.2)
Average precipitation mm (inches)	97.9 (3.85)	100.4 (3.95)	125.5 (4.94)	77.9 (3.07)	15.3 (0.60)	2.0 (0.08)	0.2 (0.01)	0.6 (0.02)	8.5 (0.33)	33.5 (1.32)	93.5 (3.68)	115.1 (4.53)	670.4 (26.39)
Average precipitation days (≥ 1.0 mm)	7	7	8	5	2	0	0	0	1	3	7	8	48
Average relative humidity (%)	62.7	61.8	64.6	61.3	57.8	56.6	53.1	48.9	45.1	47.1	55.2	61.6	56.3
Mean monthly sunshine hours	241.9	220.3	239.0	251.0	268.2	279.3	301.8	309.1	290.7	273.7	232.4	226.2	3,133.6
Source: Instituto Nacional de Meteorologia
