= Biangabip Airport =

Airport in Western, Papua New Guinea

- IATA: BPK; ICAO: AYBQ

Summary
- Airport type: Public
- Operator: Government
- Serves: Biangabip, Western Province, Papua New Guinea
- Coordinates: 05°31′35″S 141°44′40″E

Map
- Location of the airport in Papua New Guinea

Runways
Direction	Length		Surface
Direction	m	ft	Surface
16/34	500	1,640	Grass
- Source: WAD, GCM, STV

Biangabip Airport (IATA: BPK, ICAO: AYBQ) is an international airport serving Biangabip, a small locality in the Western Province in Papua New Guinea.
