= Breiðdalsvík =

- Village
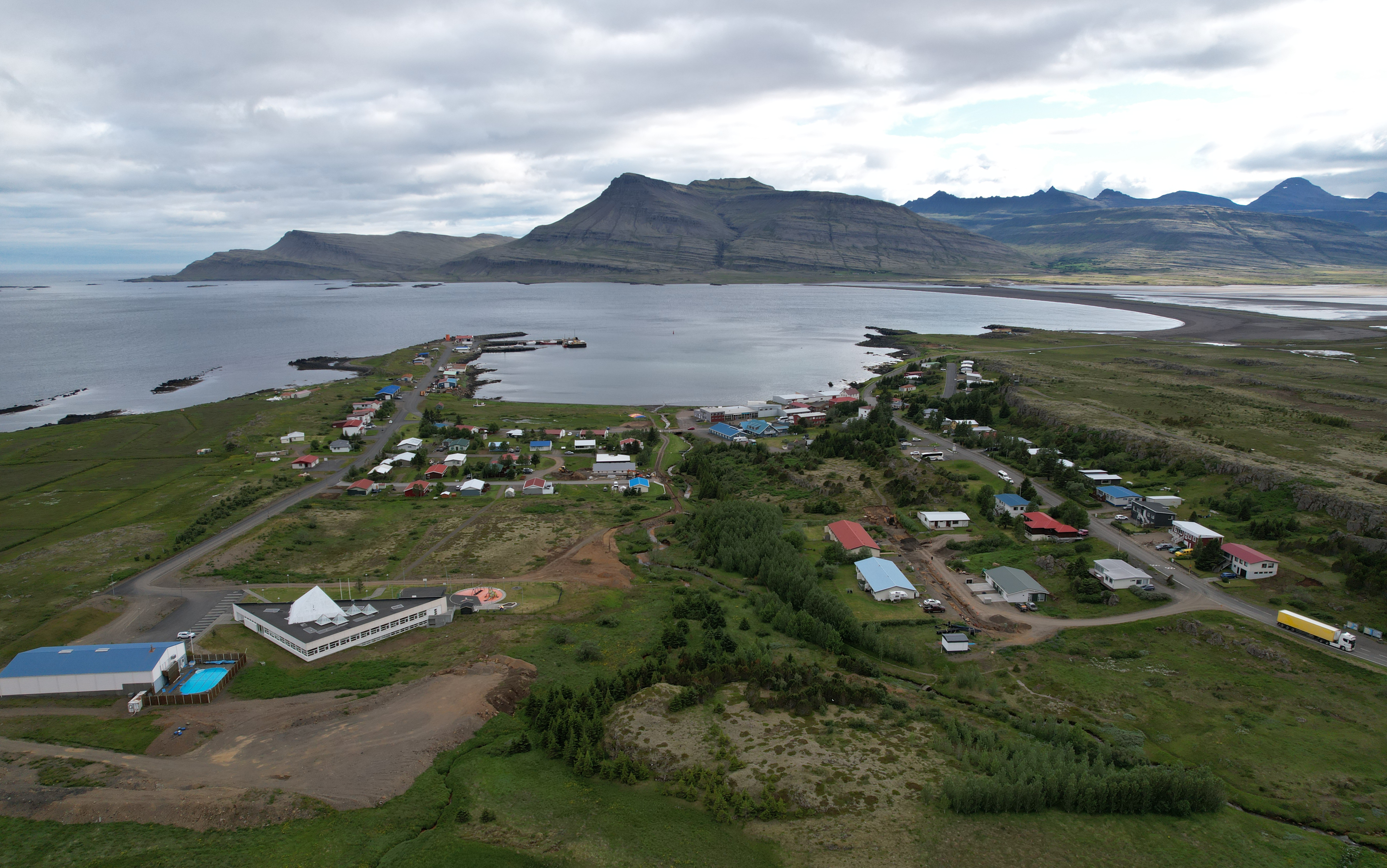
- Breiðdalsvík seen from the air

- Location of the Municipality of Fjarðabyggð

- Location in Iceland
- Coordinates: 64°46′N 14°0′W
- Country: Iceland
- Constituency: Northeast Constituency
- Region: Eastern Region
- Municipality: Fjarðabyggð

Population (2024)
  - Total: 147
- Time zone: UTC+0 (GMT)

Breiðdalsvík (Icelandic pronunciation: [ˈpreiðˌtalsˌviːk]) is a fishing town in Iceland, located on a large cove of the same name.

It is part of the municipality of Fjarðabyggð in the Eastern Region, and is at the mouth of Breiðdalur, the valley of the river Breiðdalsá. Route 95 branches off Route 1 near Breiðdalsvík and runs through the valley and over Breiðdalsheiði, a heath formed by an eroded volcano, to Egilsstaðir.

The primary industry is fishing. The settlement was established relatively recently. The former general store, the oldest building in the town, is now a geological centre with exhibits devoted to the volcanologist George Walker and to the linguist and literary historian Stefán Einarsson, who was born in Breiðdalur. The former fish factory has also been preserved. Breiðdalsvík has a hotel and a craft brewery. The Breiðdalsá is popular for salmon fishing.

On 10 September 1942, Breiðdalsvík was the location of one of the few World War II air raids in Iceland: a German warplane strafed a residential building called Hamar, hitting it with 9 bullets. The building was occupied, but there were no injuries.

== See also ==
- Breiðdalsvík Airport
