= Sherbro International Airport =

Airport in Sierra Leone

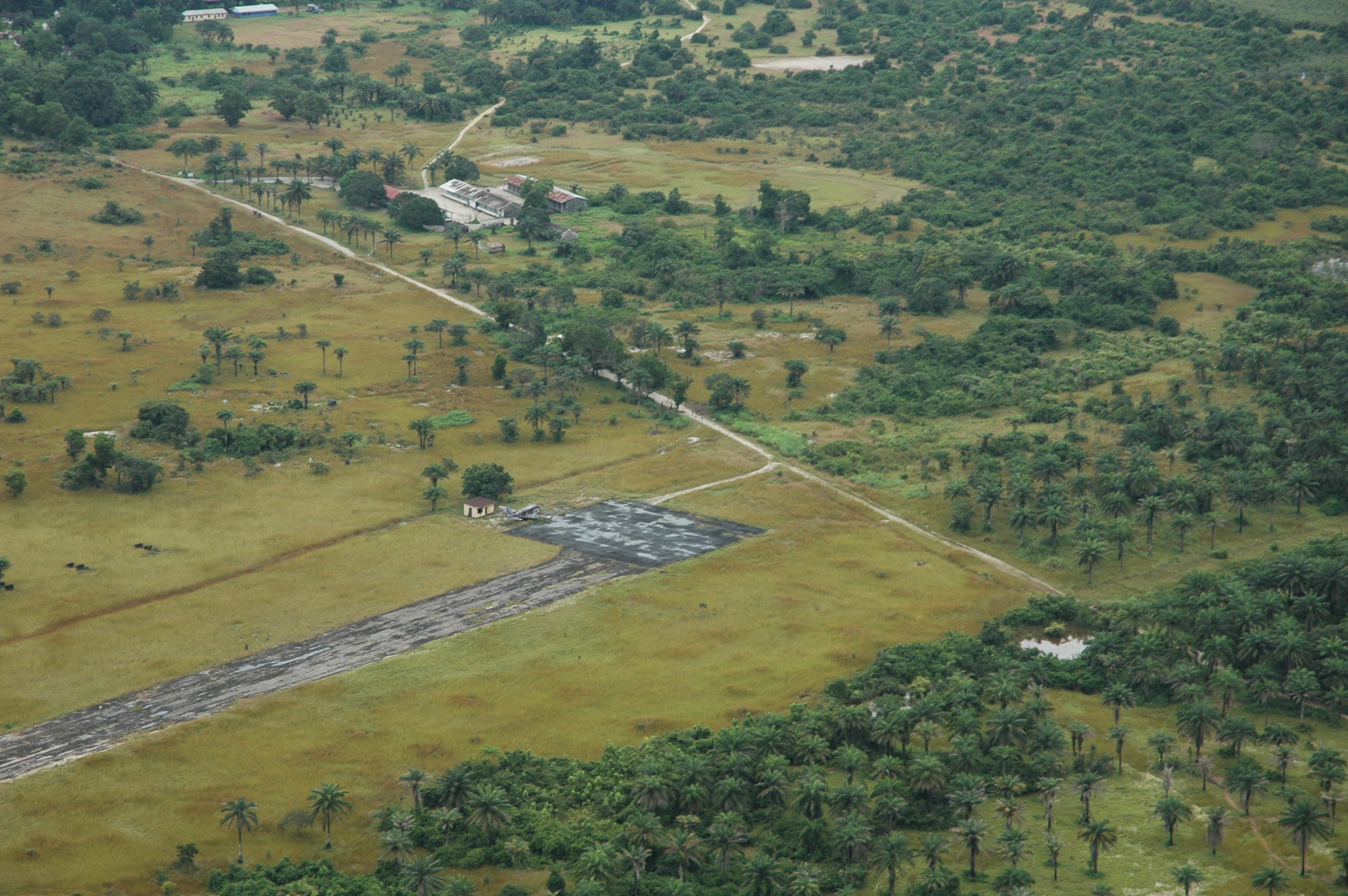
- IATA: BTE; ICAO: GFBN

Summary
- Airport type: Public (closed)
- Operator: Sierra Leone Airports Authority
- Serves: Bonthe
- Closed: 2002
- Elevation AMSL: 14 ft / 4 m
- Coordinates: 07°31′55″N 012°31′06″W

Map
- Location within Sierra Leone

Runways
Direction	Length		Surface
Direction	ft	m	Surface
15/33	3,600	1,097	Unpaved (closed)

Sherbro International Airport (IATA: BTE, ICAO: GFBN) was an international airport located outside the town of Bonthe on Sherbro Island, Sierra Leone.

The airport is reported closed since around 2002, possibly in connection with the Sierra Leone Civil War.

There are plans to construct a new airport runway on Sherbro Island. The runway will be part of a new development program for the island.
