= Big Lake, Alaska =

- CDP
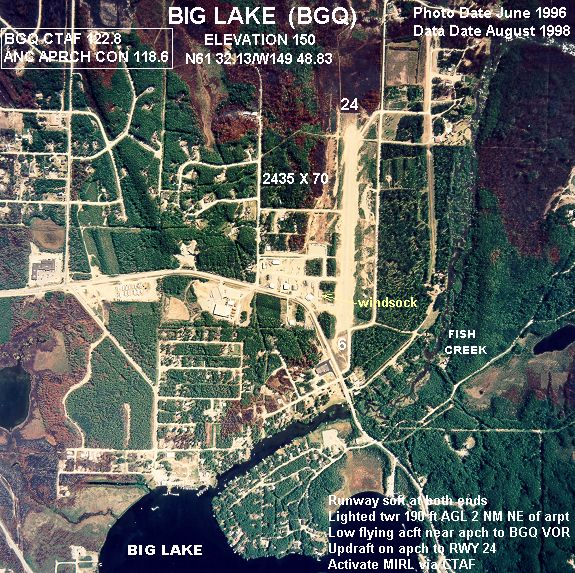
- Aerial photograph of Big Lake in 1996

- Location in Matanuska-Susitna Borough and the state of Alaska
- Coordinates: 61°32′15″N 149°53′28″W
- Country: United States
- State: Alaska
- Borough: Matanuska-Susitna

Government
  - Borough mayor: Edna DeVries
  - State senators: Shelley Hughes (R); Mike Shower (R)
  - State reps.: Kevin McCabe (R); Cathy Tilton (R)

Area
  - Total: 127.74 sq mi (330.84 km^{2})
  - Land: 115.44 sq mi (298.98 km^{2})
  - Water: 12.30 sq mi (31.86 km^{2})
- Elevation: 144 ft (44 m)

Population (2020)
  - Total: 3,833
  - Density: 33.2/sq mi (12.82/km^{2})
- Time zone: UTC-9 (Alaska (AKST))
  - Summer (DST): UTC-8 (AKDT)
- ZIP code: 99652
- Area code: 907
- FIPS code: 02-07070
- GNIS feature ID: 1866933

Big Lake (Dena'ina: K'enaka Bena)is a census-designated place (CDP) in Matanuska-Susitna Borough, Alaska, United States. It is part of the Anchorage, Alaska Metropolitan Statistical Area. The population was 3,833 at the 2020 census, up from 3,350 in 2010.

== Geography ==
Big Lake is located at 61°32′15″N 149°53′28″W (61.537449, -149.891104).

According to the United States Census Bureau, the CDP has a total area of 144.8 square miles (375 km^{2}), of which, 131.9 square miles (342 km^{2}) of it is land and 12.9 square miles (33 km^{2}) of it (8.89%) is water.

It contains Big Lake Airport, a general use airport with a gravel runway.

== Climate ==
Big Lake, Alaska experiences an average of 51.4 inches of snowfall per year, 109 precipitation days, 131 sunny days, and an average annual wind speed of 8.18 MPH.

Climate data for Big Lake, Alaska
Month	Jan	Feb	Mar	Apr	May	Jun	Jul	Aug	Sep	Oct	Nov	Dec	Year
Record high °F (°C)	47 (8)	49 (9)	54 (12)	69 (21)	83 (28)	88 (31)	89 (32)	86 (30)	76 (24)	62 (17)	54 (12)	49 (9)	89 (32)
Mean daily maximum °F (°C)	16 (−9)	24 (−4)	35 (2)	47 (8)	60 (16)	68 (20)	69 (21)	66 (19)	56 (13)	39 (4)	22 (−6)	18 (−8)	43 (6)
Mean daily minimum °F (°C)	−2 (−19)	2 (−17)	8 (−13)	22 (−6)	34 (1)	44 (7)	49 (9)	46 (8)	36 (2)	33 (1)	5 (−15)	1 (−17)	23 (−5)
Record low °F (°C)	−50 (−46)	−48 (−44)	−36 (−38)	−21 (−29)	16 (−9)	28 (−2)	31 (−1)	22 (−6)	−14 (−26)	−20 (−29)	−40 (−40)	−42 (−41)	−50 (−46)
Average precipitation inches (mm)	1.17 (30)	0.95 (24)	0.71 (18)	0.83 (21)	0.90 (23)	1.28 (33)	2.15 (55)	3.79 (96)	3.78 (96)	2.97 (75)	1.53 (39)	1.69 (43)	21.75 (553)

== Parks ==
The area is home to three Alaska State Parks facilities. Big Lake North State Recreation Site is a 19 acres (7.7 ha) park with a large campground, picnic areas, boat launch, and jetski rentals. Big Lake South State Recreation Site has a smaller campground, picnic sites, and boat launch. Winter activities in both parks include cross country skiing, ice fishing, and dog mushing.

The Rocky Lake State Recreation Site is a 49 acres (20 ha) park with a campground, picnic areas, and lake access.

== Demographics ==
=== 2020 census ===
As of the 2020 census, Big Lake had a population of 3,833. The median age was 44.6 years. 21.6% of residents were under the age of 18 and 19.4% of residents were 65 years of age or older. For every 100 females there were 111.5 males, and for every 100 females age 18 and over there were 110.2 males age 18 and over.

0.0% of residents lived in urban areas, while 100.0% lived in rural areas.

There were 1,602 households in Big Lake, of which 25.5% had children under the age of 18 living in them. Of all households, 49.8% were married-couple households, 24.2% were households with a male householder and no spouse or partner present, and 18.2% were households with a female householder and no spouse or partner present. About 27.7% of all households were made up of individuals and 10.6% had someone living alone who was 65 years of age or older.

There were 2,958 housing units, of which 45.8% were vacant. The homeowner vacancy rate was 2.2% and the rental vacancy rate was 14.9%.

Racial composition as of the 2020 census
Race	Number	Percent
White	3,070	80.1%
Black or African American	21	0.5%
American Indian and Alaska Native	263	6.9%
Asian	38	1.0%
Native Hawaiian and Other Pacific Islander	56	1.5%
Some other race	28	0.7%
Two or more races	357	9.3%
Hispanic or Latino (of any race)	115	3.0%

=== 2010 census ===
As of the 2010 census, Big Lake had a population of 3,350.

=== Demographic estimates ===
As of the 2017 American Community Survey, 53.2% of residents were male, 46.8% were female, 82.8% were white, 5.2% were Native American or Alaska Native, 0.7% were Asian, and 11.3% were two or more races. 5.4% were Hispanic or Latino of any race.

== Big Lake ==
Historical population
Census	Pop.	Note	%±
1960	74		—
1970	36		−51.4%
1980	410		1,038.9%
1990	1,477		260.2%
2000	2,635		78.4%
2010	3,350		27.1%
2020	3,833		14.4%
U.S. Decennial Census

Big Lake first appeared on the 1960 U.S. Census as an unincorporated village. It was made a census-designated place (CDP) in 1980.

As of the census of 2000, there were 2,635 people, 971 households, and 647 families residing in the CDP. The population density was 20.0 inhabitants per square mile (7.7/km^{2}). There were 2,122 housing units at an average density of 16.1 per square mile (6.2/km^{2}). The racial makeup of the CDP was 87.13% White, 0.34% Black or African American, 7.32% Native American, 0.27% Asian, 0.04% Pacific Islander, 0.87% from other races, and 4.02% from two or more races. 1.97% of the population were Hispanic or Latino of any race.

There were 971 households, out of which 31.9% had children under the age of 18 living with them, 53.1% were married couples living together, 8.7% had a female householder with no husband present, and 33.3% were non-families. 24.1% of all households were made up of individuals, and 4.2% had someone living alone who was 65 years of age or older. The average household size was 2.60 and the average family size was 3.10.

In the CDP, the population was spread out, with 27.5% under the age of 18, 6.8% from 18 to 24, 32.3% from 25 to 44, 26.0% from 45 to 64, and 7.4% who were 65 years of age or older. The median age was 38 years. For every 100 females, there were 118.7 males. For every 100 females age 18 and over, there were 125.8 males.

The median income for a household in the CDP was $43,382, and the median income for a family was $47,542. Males had a median income of $40,000 versus $30,139 for females. The per capita income for the CDP was $19,285. About 9.8% of families and 14.6% of the population were below the poverty line, including 20.7% of those under age 18 and 1.0% of those age 65 or over.

== Former City of Long Island (1965–1975) ==
Historical population
Census	Pop.	Note	%±
1970	7		—
U.S. Decennial Census

Within Big Lake is the former short-lived incorporated city of Long Island, which existed from 1965–1975 and had just 7 residents on the 1970 census. It was located on the northeast side of Big Lake at 61°32′35″N 149°52′45″W. This is not to be confused with the former logging camp of Long Island.
