= Erigavo Airport =

- IATA: ERA; ICAO: HCMU

Summary
- Owner: Somaliland Civil Aviation and Airports Authority
- Serves: Erigavo, Somaliland
- Location: Erigavo, Somaliland
- Opened: 1950
- Elevation AMSL: 5,853 ft / 1,784 m
- Coordinates: 10°38′32″N 047°23′17″E

Map
- Location of airport in Somaliland

Runways
Direction	Length		Surface
Direction	m	ft	Surface
05/23	2,000	6,561	Compacted gravel

Erigavo Airport (IATA: ERA, ICAO: HCMU) is an airport serving Erigavo (Somali: Garoonka Diyaaradaha Ilkacase), the capital of the Sanaag region in Somaliland.

== Facilities ==
The airport is at an elevation of 5,720 feet (1,743 m) above mean sea level. It has a runway which is 2,000 metres (6,562 ft) long.

Tower Frequency: 121.000

MET Available 02:00Z-15:00Z
