= Lake Brooks Seaplane Base =

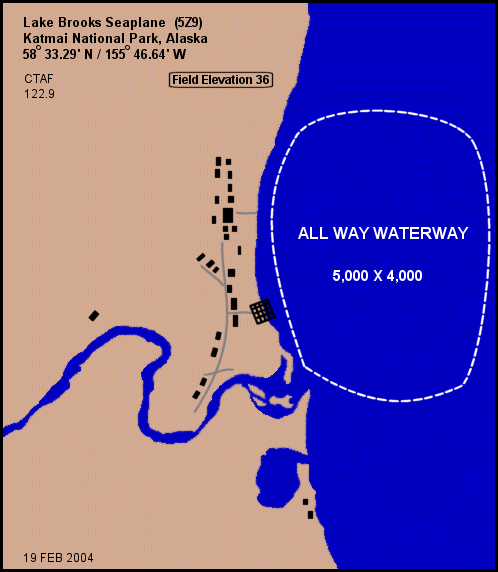
- IATA: BKF; ICAO: none; FAA LID: 5Z9

Summary
- Airport type: Public
- Owner: U.S. Department of the Interior
- Serves: Katmai National Park, Lake and Peninsula Borough, Alaska, United States
- Elevation AMSL: 36 ft (11 m)
- Coordinates: 58°33′17″N 155°46′39″W

Map
- Location of airport in Alaska

Runways
Direction	Length		Surface
Direction	ft	m	Surface
ALL/WAY	5,000	1,524	Water

Statistics (2015)
- Aircraft operations: 1,900
- Based aircraft: 0
- Passengers: 10,218
- Freight: 236,000 lbs
- Source: Federal Aviation Administration

Lake Brooks Seaplane Base (IATA: BKF, FAA LID: 5Z9) is a public-use seaplane base located near Brooks Camp in Katmai National Park, in the Lake and Peninsula Borough of the U.S. state of Alaska. It is owned by the U.S. Department of the Interior.

As per Federal Aviation Administration records, this airport had 4,295 passenger boardings (enplanements) in calendar year 2007, an increase of 86% from the 2,304 enplanements in 2006.

== Facilities ==
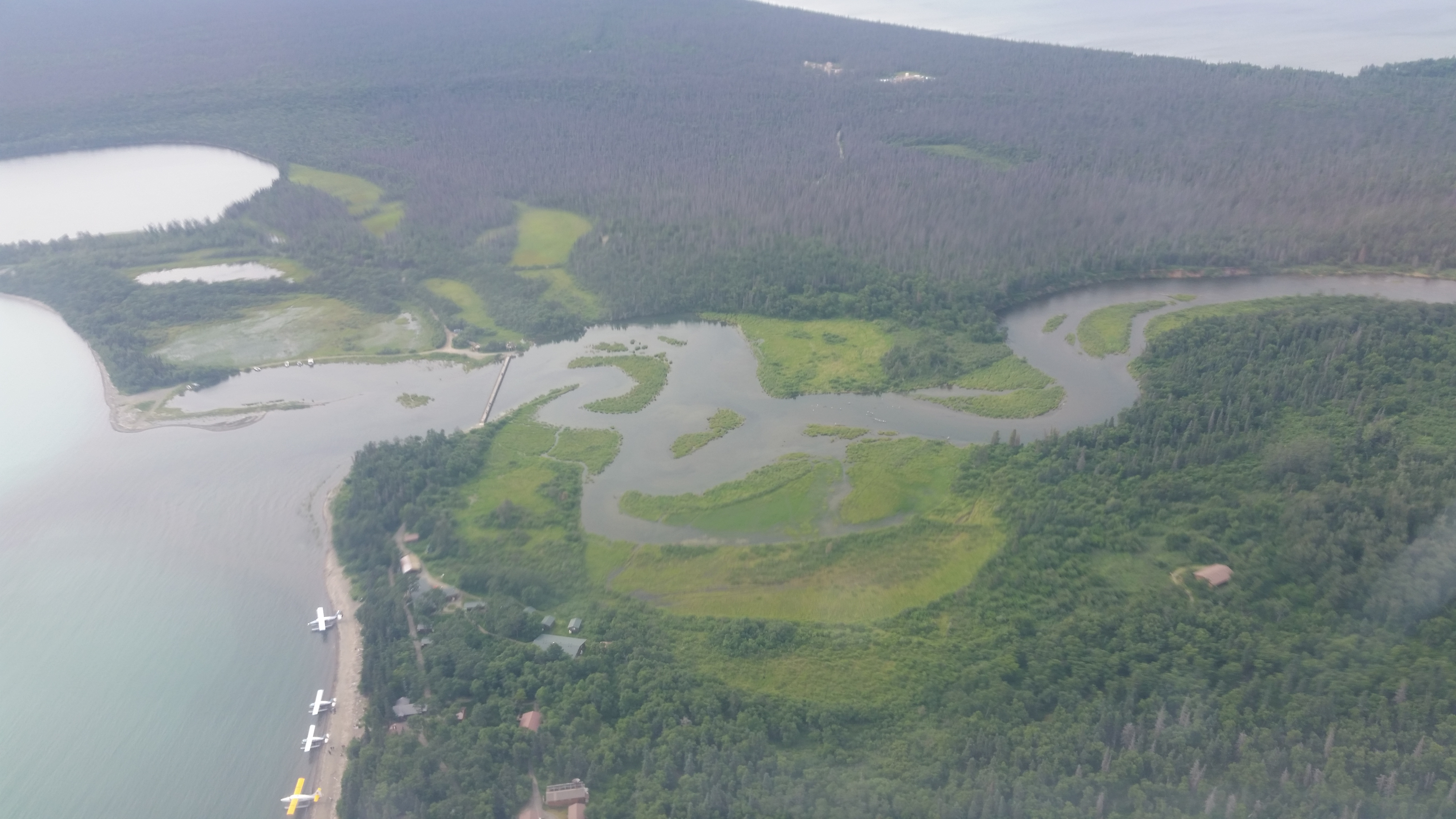
Lake Brooks Seaplane Base on Naknek Lake, Brooks Camp, Brooks River and Lake Brooks (lower left to upper right)

Lake Brooks Seaplane Base has one seaplane landing area measuring 5,000 feet by 4,000 feet (1,524 m x 1,219 m) on Naknek Lake.

=== Statistics ===
Carrier shares: January – December 2015
Carrier	Passengers (arriving and departing)
Katmai Air	10,218(100.00%)

Top domestic destinations: January – December 2015
Rank	City	Airport	Passengers
1	(Alaska) King Salmon, AK	King Salmon Airport	5,120

== See also ==
- List of airports in Alaska
