= Imsık Airport =

Imsık Airport Imsık Havalimanı
- IATA: BXN; ICAO: LTBV

Summary
- Airport type: Military
- Operator: Turkish Air Force
- Location: Bodrum
- Opened: 1987; 39 years ago
- Elevation AMSL: 202 ft (62 m)
- Coordinates: 37°08′25″N 27°40′11″E
- Interactive map of Imsık Airport

Runways
Direction	Length		Surface
Direction	ft	m	Surface
06/24	5,151	1,570	Asphalt

Imsık Airport (Imsık Havaalanı) (IATA: BXN, ICAO: LTBV) is a military airport in Bodrum, Turkey. The airport has one asphalt-surface runway that is 1,570 metres (5,150 ft) long, and 30 metres (98 ft) wide.

== History ==
Imsık Airport started in 1987 and operated by businessperson Fuat Imsık; however it was sold to the former Fenerbahçe S.K. president Ali Haydar Şen in 1993, due to Imsık's debts. Maş Air company, owned by Şen, operated flights between Bodrum and Istanbul during that period, which went bankrupt in 1993.

Ali Şen transferred his operating rights to Turkish Airlines (THY) for 2.6 million US dollars (equivalent to 5.79 million USD in 2025). However, a part of the airport land belonged to a resident woman, Hatice Bay, who did not want the land to be used as an airport. Therefore, various legal disputes between the landowner and THY arose, which ended up in favor of the landowner. THY had to pay 8.5 billion old Turkish lira (equivalent to 4.12 million TL in 2024) to Ms. Bay.

The airport ended up in insolvency due to bank debts. The bailiff of Bodrum, under the orders of the Bankruptcy Court, sold the airport to the Presidency of Defence Industries in 1997 for 583 billion old Turkish lira (equivalent to 282 million TL in 2024). The airport has continued to function as a military airport since then.

During the attempted assassination of Erdogan in 2016 coup d'état attempt; two helicopters, carrying the assassination team, had landed the airport at 4:00am for fueling. The commander-in-charge had refused to fuel the aircraft and did not allow them to leave. The soldiers had boarded a third helicopter which had just landed and fled to Greece. Three of the soldiers were caught by the airport personnel.
