= Big Lake Airport =

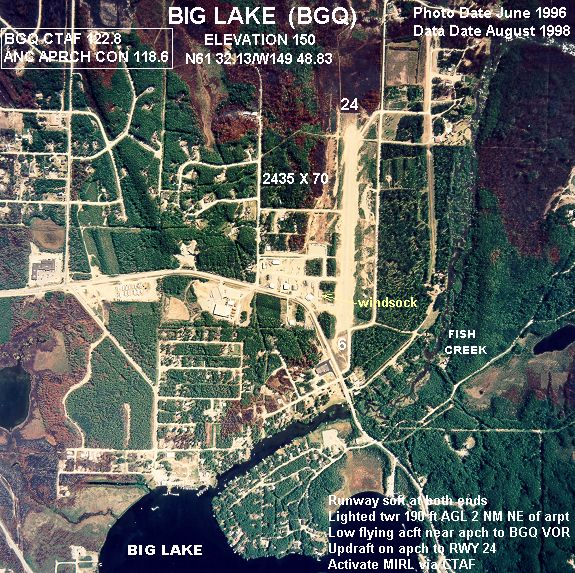
- IATA: BGQ; ICAO: PAGQ; FAA LID: BGQ

Summary
- Airport type: Public
- Owner: State of Alaska DOT&PF - Central Region
- Serves: Big Lake, Alaska
- Elevation AMSL: 158 ft (48 m)
- Coordinates: 61°32′10″N 149°48′50″W

Map
- Location of airport in Alaska

Runways
Direction	Length		Surface
Direction	ft	m	Surface
7/25	2,450	747	Gravel

Statistics (2015)
- Aircraft operations: 9,500
- Based aircraft: 68
- Source: Federal Aviation Administration

Big Lake Airport (IATA: BGQ, ICAO: PAGQ, FAA LID: BGQ) is a state-owned public-use airport located one nautical mile (1.8 km) southeast of the central business district of Big Lake, in the Matanuska-Susitna Borough of the U.S. state of Alaska.

== Facilities and aircraft ==
Big Lake Airport has one runway (7/25) with a gravel surface measuring 2,435 by 70 feet (742 x 21 m). For the 12-month period ending December 31, 2005, the airport had 20,000 aircraft operations, an average of 54 per day, all of which were general aviation. At that time there were 79 aircraft based at this airport: 95% single-engine, 4% ultralight and 1% helicopter.

== See also ==
- List of airports in Alaska
