= Barra Airport (Brazil) =

Barra Airport Aeroporto de Barra
- IATA: BQQ; ICAO: SNBX; LID: BA0028

Summary
- Airport type: Public
- Serves: Barra
- Time zone: BRT (UTC−03:00)
- Elevation AMSL: 389 m (1,276 ft)
- Coordinates: 11°04′52″S 043°08′51″W

Map
- Location in Brazil

Runways
Direction	Length		Surface
Direction	m	ft	Surface
06/24	1,300	4,265	Asphalt
- Sources: ANAC, DECEA

Barra Airport (IATA: BQQ, ICAO: SNBX) is the airport serving Barra, Brazil.

== Access ==
The airport is located 3 km (2 mi) from downtown Barra.

== See also ==
- List of airports in Brazil
