= Benguerra Island Airport =

- IATA: BCW; ICAO: none

Summary
- Airport type: Public
- Operator: Aeroportos de Mocambique (Mozambique Airports Company)
- Location: Benguerra Island
- Coordinates: 21°51′11″S 35°26′18″E

Map
- Location within Mozambique

Runways
Direction	Length		Surface
Direction	ft	m	Surface
18/36	3,280	1,000	Asphalt

Benguerra Island Airport (IATA: BCW, Portuguese: Aeroporto da Ilha de Benguerra) is an airport on Benguerra Island, Mozambique. The nearest major airport is Vilankulo Airport on the mainland of Mozambique.
