= Breiðdalsvík Airport =

- IATA: BXV; ICAO: BIBV

Summary
- Airport type: Public
- Serves: Breiðdalsvík
- Elevation AMSL: 8 ft / 2 m
- Coordinates: 64°47′20″N 14°02′30″W

Map
- Location of the airport in Iceland

Runways
Direction	Length		Surface
Direction	m	ft	Surface
12/30	938	3,077	Grass
- Source: GCM Google Maps

Breiðdalsvík Airport (IATA: BXV, ICAO: BIBV) is an airport serving Breiðdalsvík, Iceland.

== See also ==
- Transport in Iceland
- List of airports in Iceland
