= Civil Service Commission (Somaliland) =

Government agency

Civil Service Commission Hay'adda Shaqaalaha Dawladda

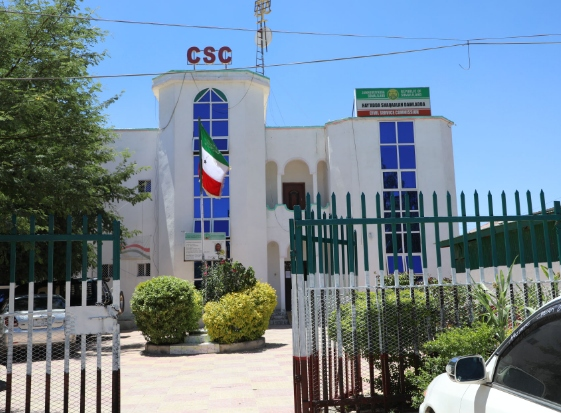

Commission overview
- Formed: 1993
- Jurisdiction: Somaliland
- Headquarters: Hargeisa, Somaliland
- Employees: 14,057
- Annual budget: 2.03 Million Dollars
- Commission executives: Abdiasiis Herzi Warsame, Chairman; Hassan Hussein Abdi, Vice Chairman; Saeed Muse Hoosh(Rooble), Director General
- Website: cscsomaliland.com

The Somaliland Civil Service Commission (Somali: Hay'adda Shaqaalaha Dawladda) is one of the four Constitutional Commissions of the Republic of Somaliland with responsibility over the civil service. Somaliland government agency established in 1993 that oversees the employment of civil servants and lead reforms in Somaliland's decentralisation process. Abdiasiis Herzi Warsame is the current chairman of the agency. The head of the agency is chairman and is appointed by the President of Somaliland.

== Mandate ==
Civil Service Commission is mandated to provide strategic leadership and guidance to the Public Service on the human resource management and development and to ensure that appointments, promotions, discipline and separation of personnel in the Public Service is done in accordance with prescribed guidelines and procedures. The CSC also has an obligation to promote measures that would ensure effective and efficient performance within the Civil Service and to promote values and principles of public administration throughout the Public Service.

== Vision ==
The vision for CSC is to be the strategic leader in enhancing the efficiency of public sector human resource management and development based on the merit system for the effectiveness of the Civil Service in Somaliland.

== Mission (Somali: Hawlaha Aasaasiga ah) ==
The mission for CSC is to provide policy direction in public service, human resource management and development, advice on appropriate organizational structures, initiate and coordinate human resource management reforms to improve service delivery for sustainable socio -economic development in Somaliland.

== Core Functions (Somali: Hawlaha Aasaasiga ah) ==
1. Coordinating the implementation and monitoring of Human resource policies and strategies
2. Coordinating the implementation of policies and strategies on recruitment, selection and promotion of civil service
3. Coordinating the implementation of policies and strategies on staff development and career progression for the civil service
4. Coordinating the implementation of policies and strategies on performance appraisal management for the civil service
5. Coordinating research on human resource development in areas relevant to the policy planning and delivery of commission’s mandate
6. Developing and implementing policies and strategies for establishment and/or institutional strengthening of human resource capacity within MDAs
7. Developing and coordinating performance appraisal and contract management for the civil service
8. Reviewing, harmonizing and updating the terms and conditions of service for the public service
9. Coordinating the preparation and implementation of the talent management program.
10. Exercising disciplinary control over and removing persons holding or acting in those offices
11. Developing capacity to recruit, select and promote suitable candidates in line with the constitutionally prescribed values and principles of public service
12. Develop a framework for the hearing and determination of appeals related to human resources from MDAs
13. Provides technical inputs on monitoring and evaluation parameters to improve planning, programming and implementation of policies and programmes of the CSC

== Incumbents ==
Name	Term began	Term end	Position	Appointed by
Farhan Aden Haybe	March 2019	September 2021	Chairman	Muse Bihi Abdi
Khalid Jama Qodax	September 2021		Chairman	Muse Bihi Abdi

== See also ==
- Politics of Somaliland
