= Borama Airport =

Airport in Borama, Somalialand

- IATA: BXX; ICAO: none

Summary
- Owner: Somaliland Civil Aviation and Airports Authority
- Serves: Borama, Somaliland
- Coordinates: 09°56′44″N 043°09′03″E

Map
- Location of airport in Somaliland

Runways
Direction	Length		Surface
Direction	m	ft	Surface
	1,800	5,906

Borama Airport (IATA: BXX) is an airport serving Borama, the capital city of the Awdal region in Somaliland. The airport is currently not in use, but there are plans to resume operations in the future.

== See also ==
- Somaliland
- List of airports in Somalia
