= Somaliland Civil Aviation and Airports Authority =

Republic of Somaliland Civil Aviation and Airports Authority
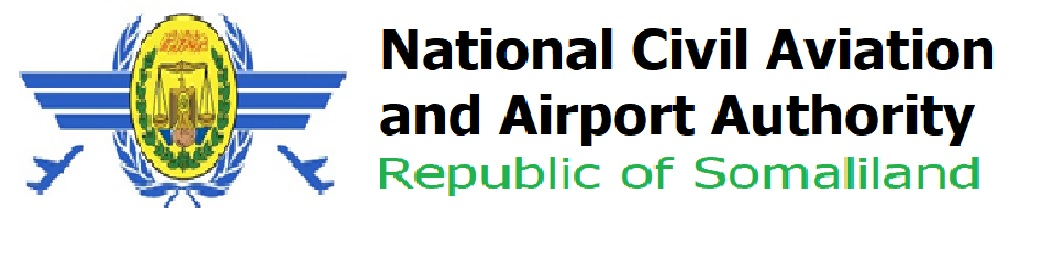
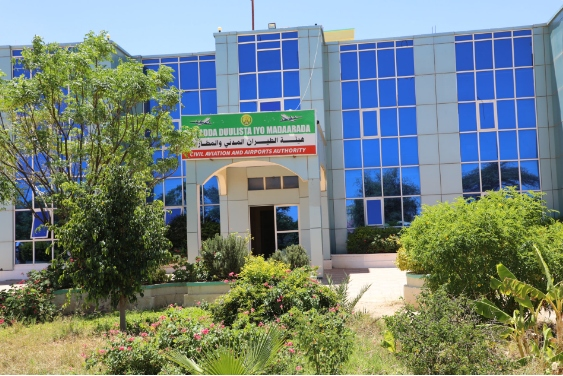
- Seal of CAAA CAAA Building
- Abbreviation: CAAA
- Formation: 2017
- Purpose: Civil aviation authority
- Location: Hargeisa Somaliland
- Region served: Somaliland
- Manager: Cumer Sayid

Civil Aviation and Airports Authority of Somaliland (CAAA; Somali: Hay'adda Duulista iyo Madaarrada) functions as the regulatory body for all aviation related activities in Somaliland. the current Manager is Abdi Mohamed Rodol.

== See also ==
- Ministry of Civil Aviation (Somaliland)
- Berbera Airport
- Egal International Airport
