= Berbera Airport =

Airport in Berbera, Somaliland

Berbera International Airport Madaarka Caalamiga ah ee Berbera
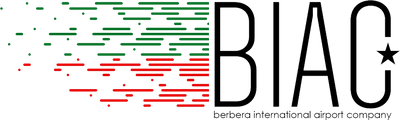

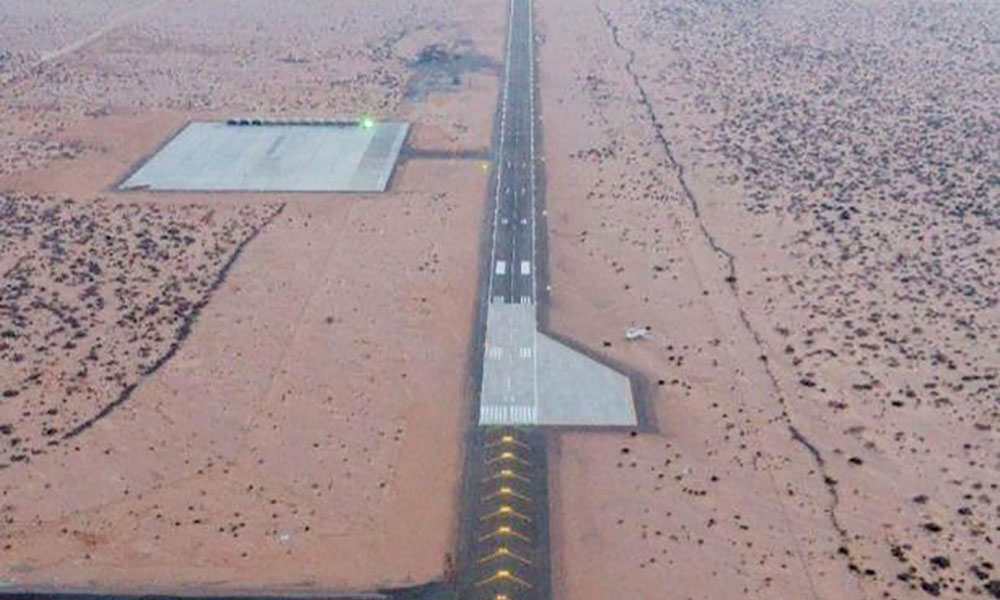
- IATA: BBO; ICAO: HCMI

Summary
- Airport type: Public; Military
- Owner: Somaliland Ministry of Civil Aviation and Airports Development
- Serves: Berbera, Somaliland
- Elevation AMSL: 30 ft / 7 m
- Coordinates: 10°23′21″N 044°56′28″E
- Website: www.berbera-airport.com

Map
- Location of airport in Somaliland

Runways
Direction	Length		Surface
Direction	ft	m	Surface
05/23	13,582	4,140	Paved Asphalt (no ILS)

Berbera International Airport (IATA: BBO, ICAO: HCMI) (Somali: Madaarka Caalamiga ah ee Berbera) is an airport in Berbera, a city in the northwestern Sahil province in Somaliland. The airport was renovated and opened to international passengers on 20 November 2021.

== History ==
The Berbera airport has a 4,140 m (13,580 ft) runway, one of the longest on the continent. The runway was built by the Soviet Union (USSR) in the mid-1970s in order to counter the United States' military presence in the region. It was rented by NASA at a cost of US$40 million per year, and used as an emergency landing site for the Space Shuttle from 1980 until 1991, when the government of former President of Somalia Siad Barre collapsed.

In 2012, Somaliland's Ministry of Civil Aviation contracted the Tekleberhan Ambaye Construction Plc (TACON) in joint venture with Afro-Tsion Contracting and investment Company to build a new terminal and perimeter fence at the Berbera airport. The Grade 1 firm had previously constructed various buildings in Ethiopia, including the Oromia region president's office, the Yayu fertilizer factory, Jimma University, Mekelle University and Gambella Region Technical and Vocational Training College. A joint venture with the Afro-Tsion Contracting and Investment Company, the project's design was conceived by the International Consultants Technocrats with joint venture with the Afro-Tsion Contracting and Investment Company. It cost 83 million Ethiopian birr in total, 3 million birr of which was earmarked for TACON.

In March 2015, President of Somaliland Ahmed Mohamed Mohamoud officially inaugurated the new airport terminal and fence, with officials from Djibouti, Ethiopia and Yemen in attendance. The terminal was constructed on a 3,200 m^{2} (34,000 sq ft) land plot and has various facilities, including public address and communication equipment, baggage transfer and checkpoints, security checks, a water tanker, 200 kg (440 lb) capacity scales, and an asphalt road leading toward the runway. The airport fence is also 12 km (7.5 mi) in length.

In 2019, the United Arab Emirates (UAE) announced plans to restore the Berbera Airport after a six-day visit by Somaliland president Muse Bihi Abdi to the United Arab Emirates. The renovation works were carried out by Dubai-based company Transport Infrastructure Services Limited (TISL). The airport was opened in November 20, 2021.

== Airlines and destinations ==
As of November 2021, Ethiopian Airlines had scheduled flights at the airport. Previously, African Express Airways and Daallo Airlines served several domestic and few international routes within Africa. In 2024, Somaliland Airlines, a state funded company, was made the national carrier with only light planes to train pilots. The airline likely plans orders of planes such as Boeing 777 and Airbus A330.
