= Cuango (disambiguation) =

Cuango may refer to:

- Cuango, Angola
- Cuango, Panama

== See also ==
- Cuango River
- Cuando
- Quango (disambiguation)
