= Filós-Hines Agreement =

The Filós-Hines agreement, whose real name was the Bases Agreement, was signed on December 10, 1947, between the Minister of Foreign Affairs of Panama, Francisco Filós, and the ambassador of the United States, General Frank T. Hines, with the approval of their respective presidents: Enríquez A. Jiménez and Harry S. Truman. It agreed to cede to the United States, for a period of 10 years, territories for military bases in Jaqué, Isla Grande, Isla del Rey, Las Margaritas, Pocrí, Punta Mala, the Río Hato base, Salud, San Blas, San José, Taboga, Taboguilla and Victoria.

The agreement was an extension of the previous one in 1942, which allowed for the installation of military bases during World War II. The military bases were dismantled a year after the end of the war.

When it was made public, there were protests by different Panamanian groups, including members of the National Assembly such as Ricardo J. Alfaro and former President Harmodio Arias. On December 22, the National Assembly unanimously rejected the agreement, and in 1948 the U.S. dismantled all bases except those in the Canal Zone.
