= Portobelo District =

- District
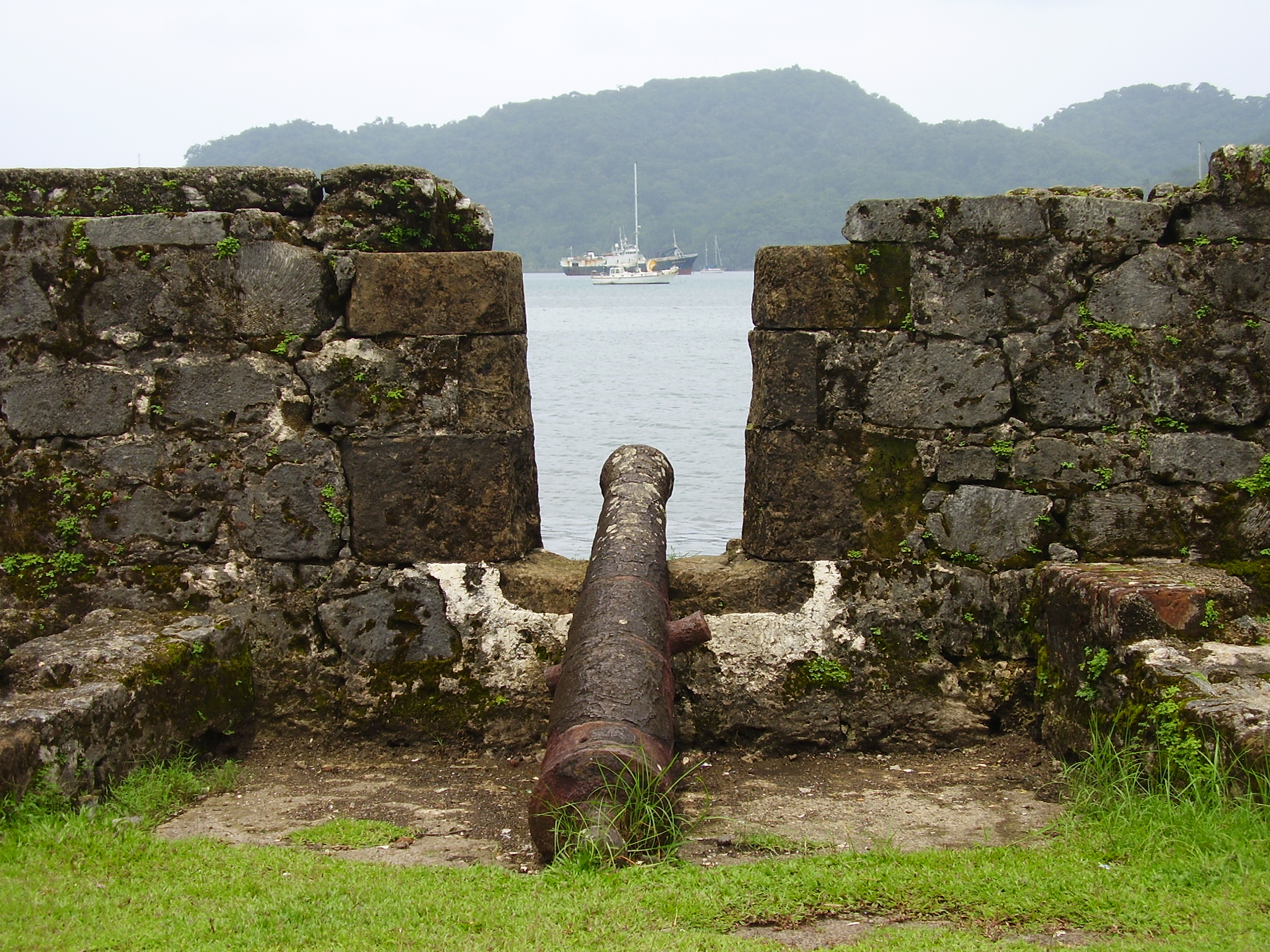

- Location of the district capital in Panama
- Coordinates: 9°33′N 79°39′W
- Country: Panama
- Province: Colón Province
- Capital: Portobelo

Area
  - Total: 153 sq mi (397 km^{2})

Population (2019)
  - Total: 10,581
  - Density: 69.0/sq mi (26.7/km^{2})
- official estimate
- Time zone: UTC-5 (ETZ)

The Portobelo District is one of the districts that make up the Colón Province, Panama. It covers an area of 397 km^{2}, and the latest official estimate of population (for 2019) is 10,581. The district capital is the town of Portobelo, the Spanish roadstead on the coast of Panama which replaced the original settlement of Nombre de Dios.

== History ==
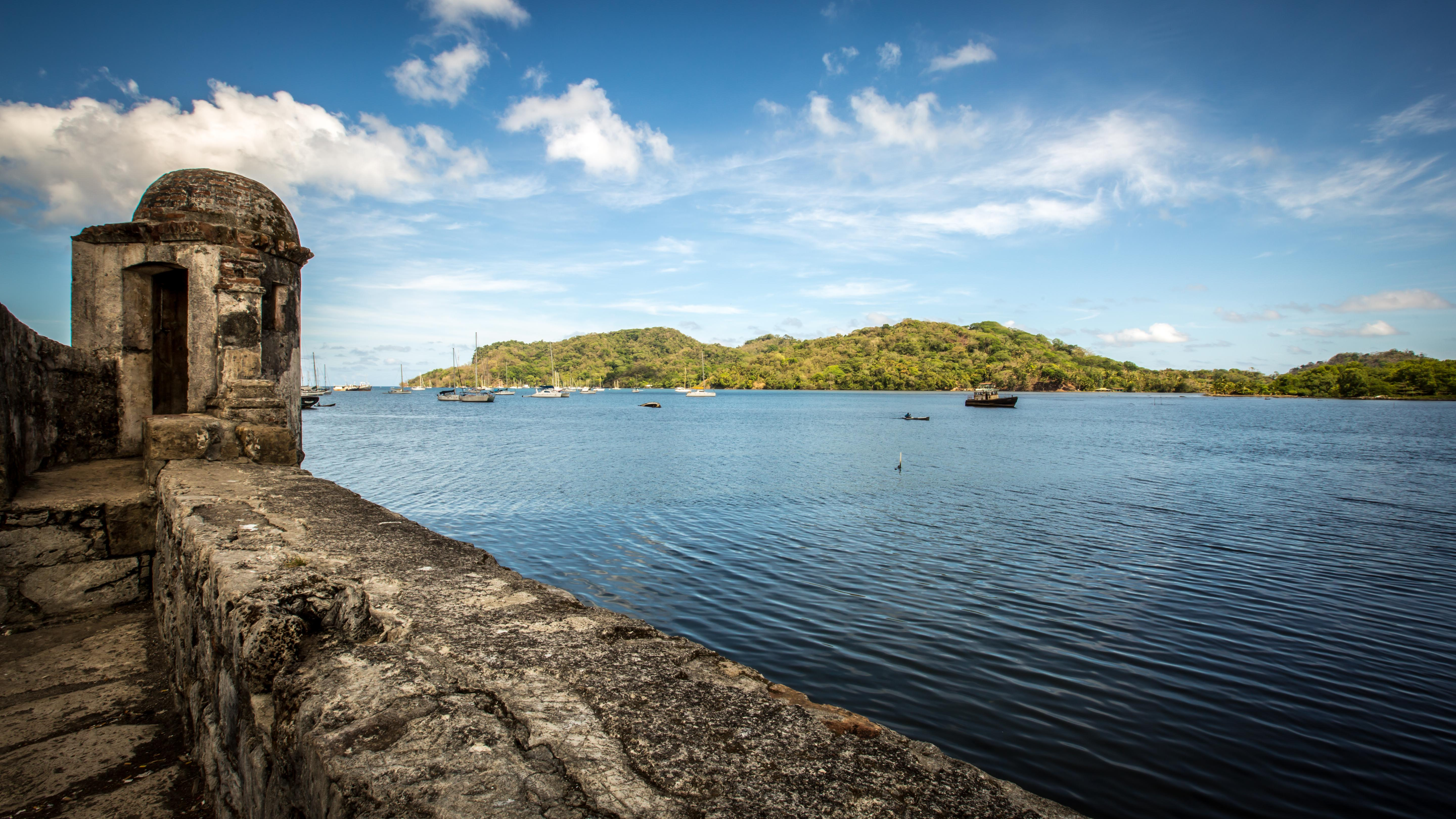
San Jeronimo Fort

The site on which to found Portobelo was discovered on November 2, 1502, by Admiral Christopher Columbus, on his fourth voyage aboard the Santa Maria thinking he had found Kataya step.

It was founded on March 20, 1597, by Francisco Velarde and Markets, replacing the city of Nombre de Dios, since it was disabled by your weather conditions. In this prosperous village was deposited all the gold from the Spanish colonies in South America. The gold from Peru, loaded on mules across the Camino de Cruces from Panama City to the town of sales and then transported by boat on the Rio Chagres to Portobelo, where they were shipped to Panama, re-embarked for Spain.

He was also famous for its fairs, which lasted for forty (40) days. The first fair was launched in the year 1606 in the name of God and then were moved to Portobelo, by position. The last show was in the year of 1739.

== Administrative divisions ==
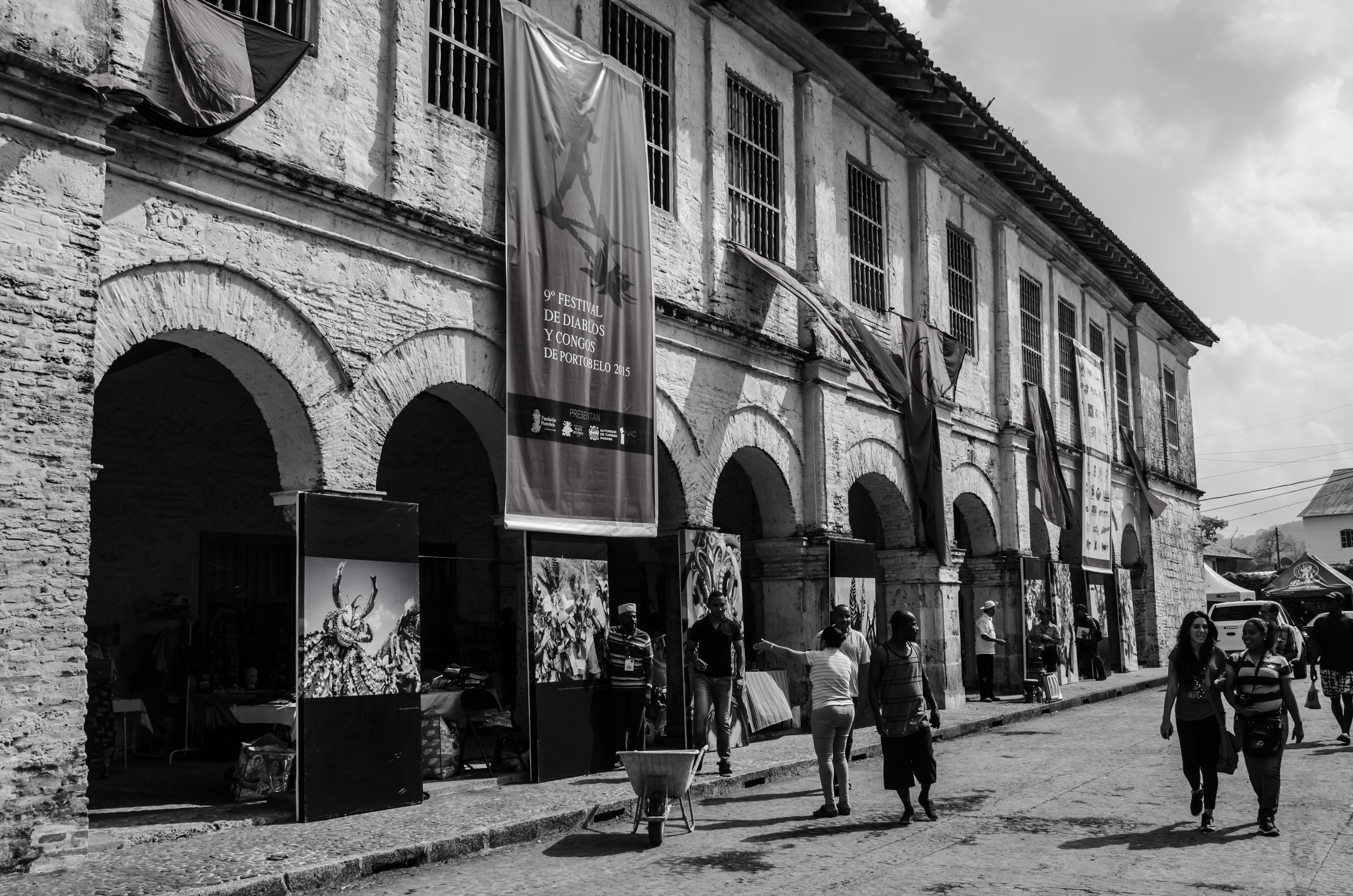
Portobelo

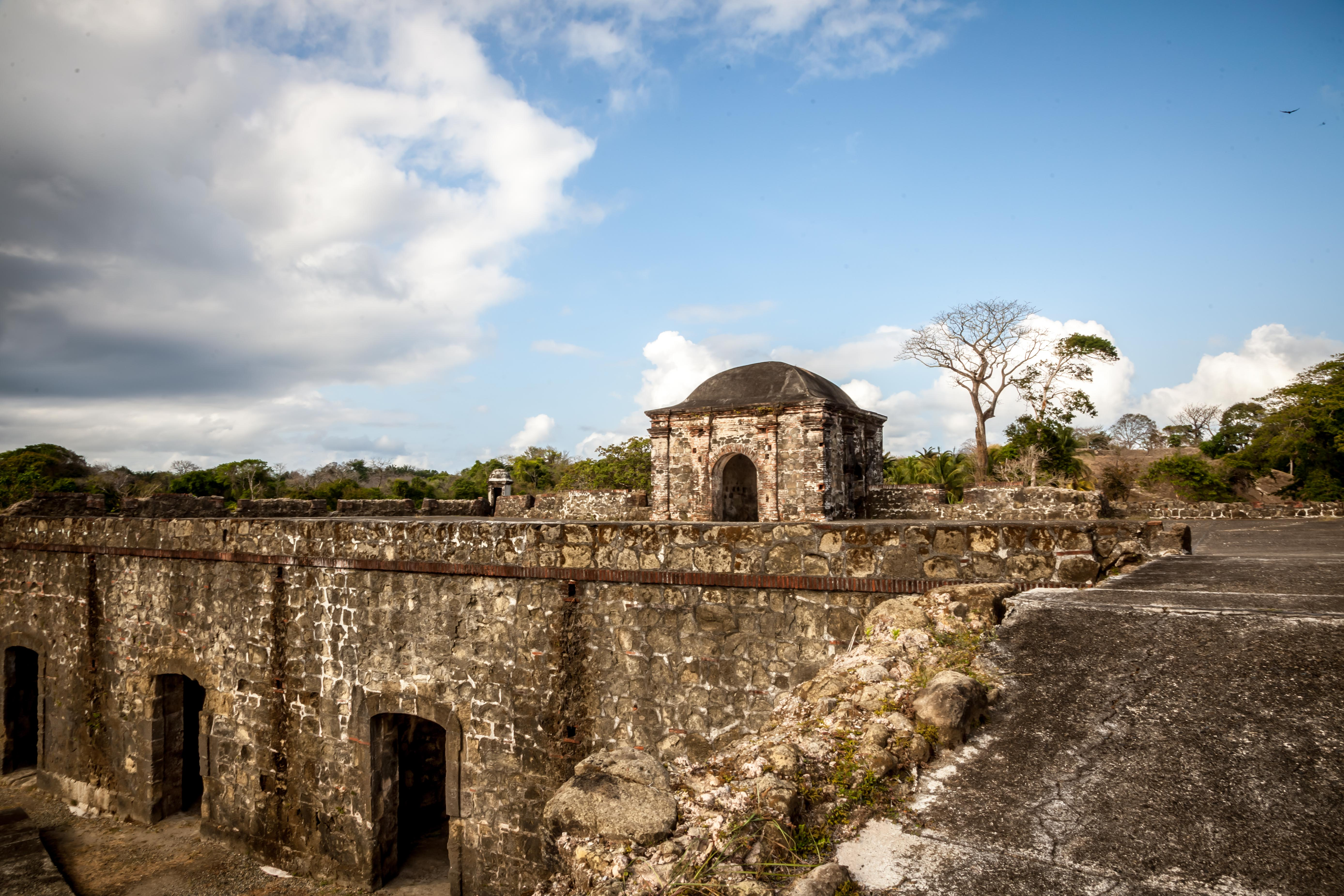
Portobelo

Portobelo District is divided administratively into the following corregimientos:

- San Felipe de Portobelo (capital)
- Cacique
- Garrote
- Isla Grande
- María Chiquita

== Culture ==
On October 21, Portobelo becomes the scene of one of the major religious traditions in Panama. These are the feasts of the Black Christ when pilgrims congregate from around the country. Some are walking long distances in payment for favors granted by the miraculous Nazarene. Others come from or carrying heavy crosses knees in penitence. During each year is visited by many pilgrims, but hikers do it only for the week of October 21.

Legend has it that the image of the Nazarene arrived in the late eighteenth century on a ship whose destination was Peru, but that bad weather forced it to disembark in Portobelo. The popular narrative has two aspects, one notes that some fishermen found it floating in the holy waters of the Caribbean and another, a Spanish Galleon Shield landfall due to bad weather, with two images on board, one of a white Christ and another of a black Christ. Each time the ship tried to sail with its cargo, a storm prevented it. After several attempts, the Spanish decided to leave the black Christ in Portobelo and were finally able to leave.
