= Coclesito =

- Locality
- Location within Panama
- Coordinates: 8°48′33.52″N 80°33′20.81″W
- Country: Panama
- Province: Colón
- District: Omar Torrijos Herrera
- Established: August 8, 1970

Population (2014)
  - Total: 1,200
- Time zone: UTC−5 (EST)

Coclesito is the capital of the Omar Torrijos Herrera District in the Colón Province, Panama. Until February 20, 2018, it was part of the Donoso District. Coclesito has an approximate population of 1200 inhabitants.

== History ==
The city of Coclesito was officially founded by Omar Torrijos Herrera on August 8, 1970. In 1971 he brought several water buffalo from Trinidad and Tobago to establish an agricultural cooperative in Coclesito. The cooperative lasted until 1990, when the buffalo were divided among the households that had operated it. Today mining has become the main industry in the area, and national tourism is also developing.

== Culture ==
Omar Torrijos built a house in Coclesito in 1978. It was converted into a museum after his death, preserving his belongings and original furniture.

Since 2014, Coclesito celebrates the annual water buffalo festival on August 8, the anniversary of the founding of the city.

== Transportation ==
The only road connection is the gravel road built in 2006 that runs from the mines through Coclesito to the south to La Pintada. Previously, there was an airfield in Coclesito, now closed, which was the destination of the plane carrying Omar Torrijos when it crashed nearby in 1981.
