= Barrio Norte =

Barrio Norte may refer to:

- Barrio Norte, Buenos Aires
- Barrio Norte, Panama
