= Omar Torrijos Herrera District =

Omar Torrijos Herrera
- District

- Location of Omar Torrijos Herrera District
- Coordinates: 8.81°N 80.56°W
- Country: Panama
- Province: Colón
- Established: 20 February 2018
- Seat: Coclesito

Government
  - Mayor: Eulalio Yángüez

Area
  - Total: 198.6 km^{2} (76.7 sq mi)

Population (2010 Census)
  - Total: 2,248
  - Estimate (2020): 2,789
  - Density: 11.32/km^{2} (29.32/sq mi)
- Time zone: UTC-5 (ETZ)
- Website: Official website

Omar Torrijos Herrera is a district in the Panamanian province of Colón, located approximately 115 kilometres (71 mi) west of Panama City. It is named after Omar Torrijos Herrera, de facto leader of Panama from 1968 to 1981.

== Geography ==
Omar Torrijos Herrera is located in the western part of Colón Province on the Atlantic side of the Panamanian cordillera. It borders the Donoso District of Colón Province to the west and north, and La Pintada District of Coclé Province to the east and south. The municipality covers an area of 198.6 square kilometres (76.7 sq mi).

The terrain is mountainous with steep slopes, and covered by rainforest. The Cocle del Norte River forms the district's eastern border with La Pintada. The district lies within the Donoso Multiple-Use protected area. Deforestation and pollution caused by mining are serious environmental concerns.

== History ==
The town of Coclesito was officially founded by Omar Torrijos on 8 August 1970. In 1971 he brought several heads of water buffalo from Trinidad and Tobago to set up an agricultural cooperative in Coclesito. The cooperative lasted until 1990, when the buffalo were divided between the households who had operated it. Nowadays mining has become the major industry in the area, and domestic tourism is also being developed.

On 20 February 2018, the National Assembly decreed the establishment of Omar Torrijos Herrera District from the former corregimiento of San José del General in Donoso District.

== Administration ==
Omar Torrijos Herrera District is divided into three corregimientos: San José del General, San Juan de Turbe, and Nueva Esperanza. Omar Torrijos Herrera elected its first mayor, Eulalio Yángüez, in 2019.

== Demographics ==
In the 2010 Census of Panama, the former corregimiento of San José del General (contiguous with the current Omar Torrijos Herrera District) recorded a population of 2248 inhabitants living in 380 households. The National Institute of Statistics and Census of Panama projected the population of the former corregimiento to reach 2789 by the year 2020. Coclesito is the largest community in the district and has a population of roughly 1200.

Near the mining concessions are several communities inhabited by the indigenous Ngäbe people, who began moving into the area in the late 1980s and early 1990s.

== Culture ==
Omar Torrijos built a house in Coclesito in 1978. It was converted into a museum after his death, preserving his belongings and the original furnishings.

Since 2014, Coclesito has celebrated an annual Water Buffalo Festival on 8 August, the anniversary of the founding of the town.

== Economy and infrastructure ==
In recent times, the economy of Omar Torrijos Herrera has been dominated by mining. The short-lived Molejón gold mine, approximately 10 kilometres (6.2 mi) west of Coclesito, was the first modern mine in Panama. It was operated from 2010 to 2013 by Petaquilla Minerals. Adjacent to it is the copper-producing Cobre Panamá mine, which was the largest single private sector investment in Panama's history and began operations in 2019.

The only road connection between the district and the rest of Panama is the gravel road built in 2006 that runs from the mines through Coclesito south to La Pintada. There was formerly an airfield at Coclesito, now closed, which was the destination of the airplane carrying Omar Torrijos that crashed nearby in 1981.
