= Cristo Negro (Portobelo) =

Statue of Jesus in Portobelo, Panama

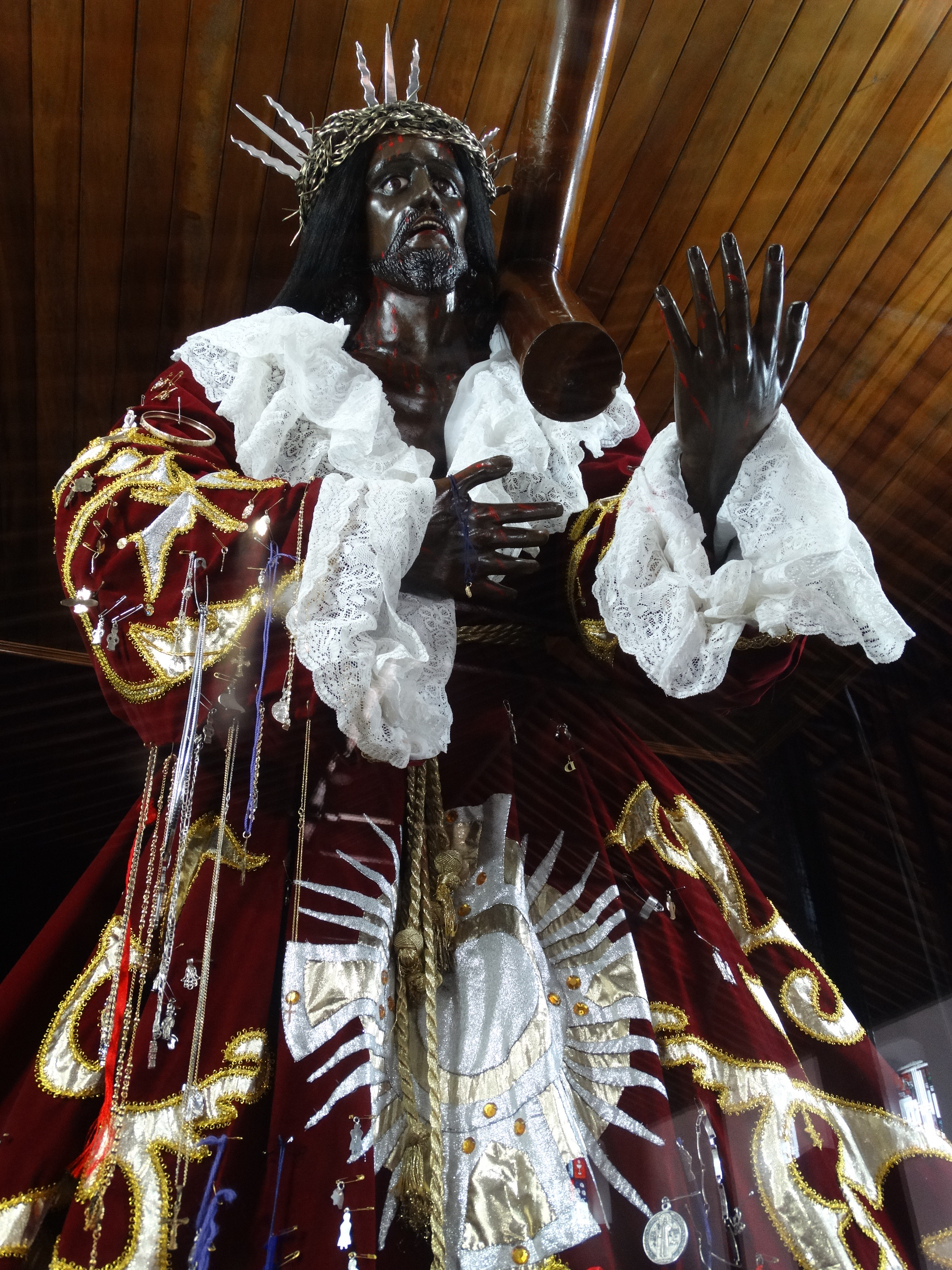
Cristo Negro

Cristo Negro (Black Christ; also known as "Nazareno", "Naza", "el Negro", "el Negrito", "el Cristo", and "el Santo") is a wooden statue of Jesus Christ in Iglesia de San Felipe in Portobelo, Panama. The statue was found on the shores of the town's harbour. Life size, it is adorned with a robe that is changed twice a year, once during the Festival of the Black Christ and during Holy Week. Black Christ is venerated throughout the year, most particularly on October 21, during the Festival of the Black Christ.

A similar image called The Black Nazarene is venerated in the Philippines.

== Statue ==
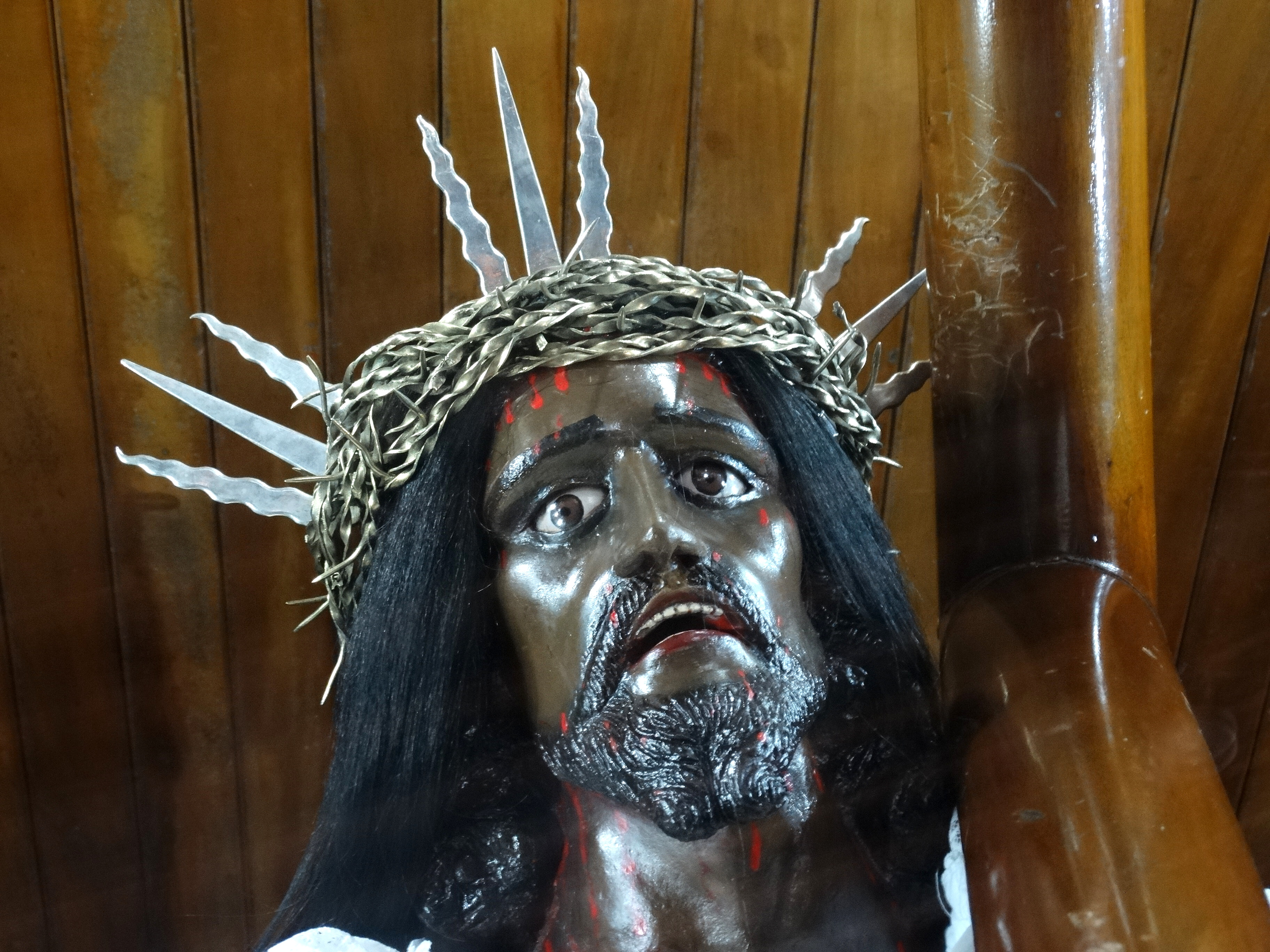
Close-up of head

The origins of the statue are unclear. The wooden image of Christ washed ashore at Portobelo, picked up by fishermen. It was initially housed in a small church and venerated. After Iglesia de San Felipe was built, the statue was installed there. One legend says that the statue was said to be sent to Spain. Some time during the 17th century (an exact date is not identified), it was carried in a Colombian vessel to be installed in the New World. Due to a storm, the ship was forced to dock at Portobelo. When the ship was scheduled to depart, a sudden storm set in, preventing the ship to set sail; this happened repeatedly. Attributing this phenomenon to the statue, the superstitious sailors threw the box containing the statue into the sea and thereafter the storm subsided, and the ship moved on.

The statue is life-size and carries a cross. The image is carved of heavy cocobolo (Dalbergia retusa) wood of dark brown colour. The image reflects emotional pain. It is deified in the church on a platform to the left of the altar. A gilded plaque with items linked with Christ's crucifixion, such as nails, a crown of thorns, and dice as used by the Roman soldiers adorns the statue.

At various times, the statue is dressed in a robe. During the Black Christ Festival held on October 21, the robe is of red or wine in colour. It is of purple colour during Holy Week. The robes are donated by devotees usually anonymously, and once changed the robes are not reused. The robes are sometimes made of simple fabric, and sometimes of more expensive fabric with rich designs and gold borders. All the gowns which have adorned the statue, and which are changed twice a year, are now preserved in a museum called the Museo del Cristo Negro (Black Christ Museum), which is located at the Church of San Juan de Dios, a 17th-century church located behind the Iglesis de San Felipe. Previously the museum building had been a hospital. As of 2010, the museum had 60 robes which once adorned the Black Christ statue. The robes are a mark of an individual devotee's expressed adoration of the Black Christ and their penance seeking atonement of sin.

== Pilgrimage ==
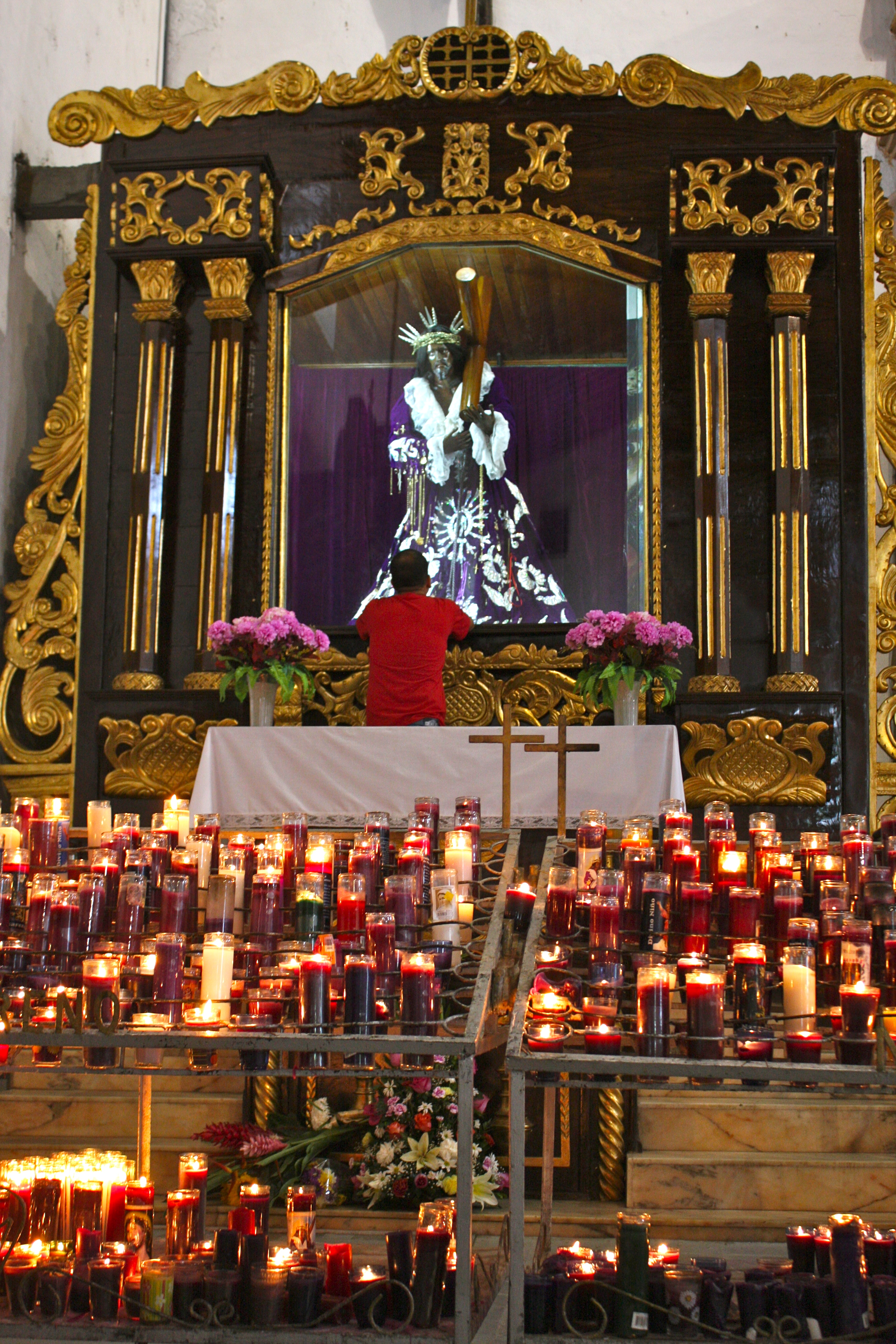
Veneration of Cristo Negro at Iglesia de San Felipe

The statue is venerated by people from all parts of Panama. Several miracles have been attributed to Cristo Negro and so it is also referred to as "El Nazareno." Visiting the church is a pilgrimage undertaken by villagers. Some walk 53 miles (85 km) from Panama City, others walk 22 miles (35 km) from Sabanitas, and a few pilgrims crawl the last mile on their hands and knees, seeking blessings at the shrine.

During the pilgrimage, pilgrims adorn themselves with purple robes (representing the clothing worn by Jesus when Roman soldiers made fun of him for claiming kingship) similar to the one that adorns Cristo Negro.

Criminals also make this pilgrimage to atone for their crimes. There are many stories related to criminals participating on the festival day, which has resulted in designating the Black Christ as the "patron saint of criminals."

Some devout worshipers pin gold charms on their robes as symbols of faith. On arriving at the threshold of the church, pilgrims discard their robes at the midnight hour.

== Art works ==
Among the many art works that the Cristo Negro has inspired, two audiovisual products are remarkable. Panamanian photographer Sandra Eleta included a majestic coverage of the Cristo Negro massive procession in her slide-show "Portobelo", while Cuban-American filmmaker Alfredo Alvarez Calderón released in 1996 a comprehensive documentary on the cult, pilgrimage and procession, called "El Cristo Negro de Portobelo". Painter Rogelio Pretto and other Panamanian artists have also contributed many works with the Cristo Negro image.

== See also ==
- List of statues of Jesus

== Bibliography ==
- Association, American Home Economics (1964). Family Holidays Around the World.
- Friar, William (9 July 2013). Moon Spotlight Panama City & the Panama Canal. Avalon Travel. ISBN 978-1-59880-877-3.
- Hassig, Susan M.; Quek, Lynette (2007). Panama. Marshall Cavendish. ISBN 978-0-7614-2028-6.
- Katzman, Patricia (1 November 2005). Panama. Hunter Publishing, Inc. ISBN 978-1-58843-529-3.
- Kronegger, M.; Tymieniecka, Anna-Teresa (14 March 2013). The Aesthetics of Enchantment in the Fine Arts. Springer Science & Business Media. ISBN 978-94-017-3234-5.
- Melton, J. Gordon (13 September 2011). Religious Celebrations: An Encyclopedia of Holidays, Festivals, Solemn Observances, and Spiritual Commemorations. ABC-CLIO. ISBN 978-1-59884-205-0.
- Soley, La Verne M. Seales (30 December 2008). Culture and Customs of Panama. ABC-CLIO. ISBN 978-0-313-05636-9.
- Stallings, Doug (15 October 2012). Fodor's Caribbean Ports of Call. Fodor's. p. 213. ISBN 978-0-307-92940-2.
