= El Guásimo =

El Guásimo may refer to:

- El Guásimo, Colón
- El Guásimo, Los Santos
