= Punta Mala =

Punta Mala may refer to:

- Punta Mala, Panama, a cape in Los Santos Province, Panama
- Carbonera Lighthouse in Andalusia, Spain, also known as Torre de Punta Mala
