= Old Quarter =

Old Quarter can refer to:

- Old Quarter of Colon, Panama
- Old Quarter, Hanoi, Vietnam
- Old City (Shanghai), China
- Old Quarter Acoustic Cafe, Texas (formerly, Old Quarter)
