= Autonomous Provincial Concentration =

Panamanian former political party

The Autonomous Provincial Concentration (in Spanish: Concentración Provincial Autónoma, CPA) was a Panamanian small regionalist conservative political party.

The party was active in Colón Province in the 1930s and 1940s. The CPA was represented in the Panamian Parliament from 1940 to 1945. Pedro Fernández Parrilla was the founder and leader of the PCU.
