= Barrio Sur =

Barrio Sur may refer to:

- Barrio Sur, Montevideo
- Barrio Sur, Panama
