= El Guabo =

El Guabo may refer to:

- El Guabo, Ecuador
- El Guabo, Colón, Panama
