= San José del General =

- Corregimiento
- Location within Panama
- Country: Panama
- Province: Colón
- District: Omar Torrijos Herrera

Area
  - Land: 198.6 km^{2} (76.7 sq mi)

Population (2010)
  - Total: 2,248
  - Density: 11.3/km^{2} (29/sq mi)
- Population density calculated based on land area.
- Time zone: UTC−5 (EST)

San José del General is a corregimiento in Omar Torrijos Herrera District, Colón Province, Panama with a population of 2,248 as of 2010. Its population as of 1990 was 1,422; its population as of 2000 was 1,207.

On February 20, 2018 San José del General was separated from Donoso District to form the new Omar Torrijos Herrera District. The new district is divided into three corregimientos. One of these is still called San José del General, while the others are called San Juan de Turbe and Nueva Esperanza.
