= Old Quarter of Colon =

Old Quarter of Colon Casco Antiguo de Colón
- Historic District of Colon
- Location within Panama
- Coordinates: 9°21′N 79°54′W
- Province: Colón
- District: Colón

The historic "Tacita de Oro" of the Atlantic Coasts. The Old Quarters of Colon are under renovation and reconstruction.

== History ==
The city was founded by Americans in 1850 as the Atlantic terminal of the Panama Railroad, then under construction to meet the gold rush demand for a fast route to California. For a number of years early in its history, the sizable United States émigré community called the town Aspinwall after Panama Railroad promoter William Henry Aspinwall, while the city's Hispanic community called it Colon in honor of Christopher Columbus. The city was founded on the western end of a treacherously marshy islet known as Manzanillo Island. As part of the construction of the Panama Railroad, the island was connected to the Panamanian mainland by a causeway and part of the island was drained to allow the erection of permanent buildings.
