= Río Indio, Colón =

Río Indio
- Corregimiento
- Location within Panama
- Coordinates: 9.1922°N 80.1903°W
- Country: Panama
- Province: Colón
- District: Donoso

Area
  - Land: 36.4 km^{2} (14.1 sq mi)

Population (2010)
  - Total: 1,044
  - Density: 28.7/km^{2} (74/sq mi)
- Population density calculated based on land area.
- Time zone: UTC−5 (EST)

Río Indio is a corregimiento in Donoso District, Colón Province, Panama with a population of 1,044 as of 2010. Its population as of 1990 was 963; its population as of 2000 was 974.
