= Puerto Pilón =

- Corregimiento
- Location within Panama
- Coordinates: 9°21′36″N 79°47′24″W
- Country: Panama
- Province: Colón
- District: Colón

Area
  - Land: 99.6 km^{2} (38.5 sq mi)

Population (2010)
  - Total: 16,517
  - Density: 165.8/km^{2} (429/sq mi)
- Population density calculated based on land area.
- Time zone: UTC−5 (EST)

Puerto Pilón is a corregimiento in Colón District, Colón Province, Panama with a population of 16,517 as of 2010. Its population as of 1990 was 10,241; its population as of 2000 was 11,658.
