= Palmas Bellas =

- Corregimiento
- Location within Panama
- Coordinates: 9°13′48″N 80°5′24″W
- Country: Panama
- Province: Colón
- District: Chagres

Area
  - Land: 75.9 km^{2} (29.3 sq mi)

Population (2010)
  - Total: 1,844
  - Density: 24.3/km^{2} (63/sq mi)
- Population density calculated based on land area.
- Time zone: UTC−5 (EST)

Palmas Bellas is a corregimiento in Chagres District, Colón Province, Panama. As of 2010, it had a population of 1,844, up from 1,690 in Panamanian census of 2000.
