= Santa Isabel District =

- District

- Location of the district capital in Panama
- Coordinates: 9°31′N 79°10′W
- Country: Panama
- Province: Colón Province
- Capital: Palenque

Area
  - Total: 281 sq mi (727 km^{2})

Population (2019)
  - Total: 3,973
  - Density: 14.2/sq mi (5.46/km^{2})
- official estimate
- Time zone: UTC-5 (ETZ)

Santa Isabel District (Spanish pronunciation: [ˈsantajsaˈβel]) is a district (distrito) of Colón Province in Panama. The population according to the 2000 census was 3,323; the latest official estimate (for 2019) is 3,973. The district, which lies in the east of the province along the Caribbean coast, covers a total area of 727 km^{2} (281 sq mi). The capital lies at the town of Palenque.

== Administrative divisions ==
The district is divided administratively into the following corregimientos:

- Palenque (capital)
- Cuango
- Miramar
- Nombre de Dios
- Palmira
- Playa Chiquita
- Santa Isabel
- Viento Frío
