= Piña, Colón =

Piña Piña
- Corregimiento
- Location within Panama
- Coordinates: 9.2803°N 80.0472°W
- Country: Panama
- Province: Colón
- District: Chagres

Area
  - Land: 29.3 km^{2} (11.3 sq mi)

Population (2010)
  - Total: 836
  - Density: 28.6/km^{2} (74/sq mi)
- Population density calculated based on land area.
- Time zone: UTC−5 (EST)

Piña is a corregimiento in Chagres District, Colón Province, Panama with a population of 836 as of 2010. Its population as of 1990 was 687; its population as of 2000 was 700.
