= Miramar, Colón =

Coordinates: 9.5756°N 79.3361°W

Miramar
- Corregimiento
- Location within Panama
- Country: Panama
- Province: Colón
- District: Santa Isabel

Area
  - Land: 18.5 km^{2} (7.1 sq mi)

Population (2010)
  - Total: 201
  - Density: 10.9/km^{2} (28/sq mi)
- Population density calculated based on land area.
- Time zone: UTC−5 (EST)

Miramar is a corregimiento in Santa Isabel District, Colón Province, Panama with a population of 201 as of 2010. Its population as of 1990 was 88; its population as of 2000 was 180.
