= Palenque, Colón =

Coordinates: 9.5833°N 79.3667°W

Palenque
- Corregimiento
- Location within Panama
- Country: Panama
- Province: Colón
- District: Santa Isabel

Area
  - Land: 62.8 km^{2} (24.2 sq mi)

Population (2010)
  - Total: 404
  - Density: 6.4/km^{2} (17/sq mi)
- Population density calculated based on land area.
- Time zone: UTC−5 (EST)
- Climate: Am

Palenque is a corregimiento in Santa Isabel District, Colón Province, Panama with a population of 404 as of 2010. It is the seat of Santa Isabel District. Its population as of 1990 was 281; its population as of 2000 was 400.
