= Chagres District =

- District

- Location of the district capital in Panama
- Coordinates: 9°15′N 80°40′W
- Country: Panama
- Province: Colón Province
- Capital: Nuevo Chagres

Area
  - Total: 172 sq mi (445 km^{2})

Population (2019)
  - Total: 11,342
  - Density: 66.0/sq mi (25.5/km^{2})
- official estimate
- Time zone: UTC-5 (ETZ)

Chagres District (Spanish pronunciation: [ˈtʃaɣɾes]) is a district (distrito) of Colón Province in Panama. The population according to the 2000 census was 9,191; the latest official estimate (for 2019) is 11,342. The district covers a total area of 445 km^{2}. The capital lies at the town of Nuevo Chagres.

== Administrative divisions ==
Chagres District is divided administratively into the following corregimientos:

- Nuevo Chagres (capital)
- Achiote
- El Guabo
- La Encantada
- Palmas Bellas
- Piña
- Salud
