= Limón, Panama =

Coordinates: 9.2500°N 79.8167°W

Limón
- Corregimiento
- Location within Panama
- Country: Panama
- Province: Colón
- District: Colón

Area
  - Land: 74.8 km^{2} (28.9 sq mi)

Population (2010)
  - Total: 4,665
  - Density: 62.3/km^{2} (161/sq mi)
- Population density calculated based on land area.
- Time zone: UTC−5 (EST)

Limón is a corregimiento in Colón District, Colón Province, Panama with a population of 4,665 as of 2010. Its population as of 1990 was 3,209; its population as of 2000 was 4,092.
