= Nuevo Chagres =

- Corregimiento
- Location within Panama
- Coordinates: 9°14′10″N 80°05′10″W
- Country: Panama
- Province: Colón
- District: Chagres

Area
  - Land: 5.9 km^{2} (2.3 sq mi)

Population (2010)
  - Total: 499
  - Density: 85.1/km^{2} (220/sq mi)
- Population density calculated based on land area.
- Time zone: UTC−5 (EST)

Nuevo Chagres (Spanish pronunciation: [ˈnweβo ˈtʃaɣɾes], English: New Chagres) is a seaside town and corregimiento in the Colón Province of Panama, and the capital of the Chagres District. It had a population of 499 as of 2010. Its population as of 1990 was 327; its population as of 2000 was 419.

The town is named after the historical settlement of Chagres, which lay about 8.2 miles (13.2 km) to the northwest, at the mouth of the Chagres River. Although Chagres fell outside the original boundary of the Panama Canal Zone, that boundary was expanded in 1916 to include the Chagres River's mouth. The town of Chagres—with its 96 houses and 400 to 500 inhabitants—was then "depopulated," and its former residents were relocated to Nuevo Chagres.
