= Isthmus of Panama =

Narrow landstrip in Panama

Coordinates: 8°40′N 80°0′W

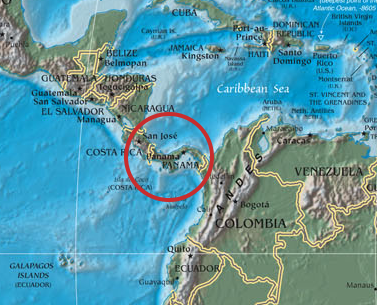
The Isthmus of Panama

The Isthmus of Panama, (Note: Spanish: Istmo de Panamá, pronounced [ˈizðmo ðe panaˈma]) historically known as the Isthmus of Darien, (Note: Spanish: Istmo de Darién, pronounced [ˈizðmo ðe ðaˈɾjen]) is the narrow strip of land that lies between the Caribbean Sea and the Pacific Ocean, linking North and South America. The country of Panama is located on the isthmus, along with the Panama Canal. Like several isthmuses on Earth, as a relatively narrow land bridge between close seas, it is a location of great geopolitical and strategic importance.

The isthmus is thought to have formed around 3 million years ago (Ma), separating the Atlantic and Pacific Oceans and causing the creation of the Gulf Stream, as first suggested in 1910 by Henry Fairfield Osborn. Osborn based the proposal on the fossil record of mammals in Central America, a conclusion that would provide a foundation for Alfred Wegener when he proposed the theory of continental drift in 1912. Some recent studies suggest an earlier formation of the isthmus, potentially as far back as 4 Ma.

== History ==
The Isthmus of Panama has always been a place of global significance. Its formation as a geological feature had several biological and climatic effects that resonated on a planetary scale. The separation of the oceans increased marine biodiversity on both sides, and the connection between the American continents allowed for the interchange of terrestrial life. The formation of the isthmus fundamentally changed the system of inter-ocean circulation of warm and cold currents, which caused the northern polar ice cap to form. The creation of the Gulf Stream and the Atlantic system of weather and currents would eventually serve as the environmental engine of the "triangle trade" routes that were the basis of the Atlantic World system in the early modern era. The remains of a variety of Paleolithic fauna that were found in the Canal Zone in 2007 include bear-dogs, miniature horses, rhinos, camels, early relatives of modern hippos, and at least one species of chalicothere. The first humans to inhabit the isthmus were Paleo-Indians, who probably arrived between 18 and 15 kya. Since then, the isthmus has been inhabited by indigenous peoples who have continually developed and adapted to life on the isthmus. The Monagrillo archeological site contains ceramics dating from 2500 to 1200 BCE, some of the earliest examples of ceramics in Central America. The site contains evidence of one of the earliest sites of maize agriculture in the region. The Monagrillo site evolved into a variety of thriving cultural traditions, identified by archeologists as the Gran Coclé culture area. Indigenous peoples in Panama have been connected to the wider regional networks of exchange and diffusion for as long as they have inhabited the isthmus, evident in the presence of Coclé gold work being found as far away as Chichin Itza in the Yucatán Peninsula. By 1501, when Europeans first arrived, the isthmus was inhabited widely by Chibchan- and Chocoan-speaking peoples.

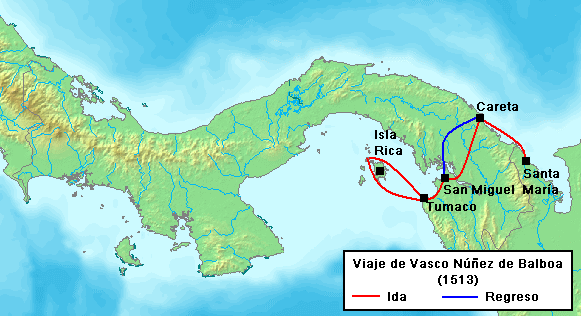
Vasco Núñez de Balboa's travel route to the South Sea, 1513

Vasco Núñez de Balboa, a Spanish conquistador, was the first European to reach the Pacific Ocean on 25 September 1513, then called the "South Sea" as it was on the south side of the isthmus. Balboa had heard of an ocean on the other side of the isthmus from natives while sailing along the Caribbean coast. In 1519 the town of Panamá was founded near a small indigenous settlement on the Pacific coast. In 1671 Welsh privateer Henry Morgan crossed the isthmus from the Caribbean side and destroyed the city. The town was relocated some kilometers to the west at a small peninsula. The ruins of the old town, Panamá Viejo, are preserved and were declared a UNESCO World Heritage Site in 1997.

European colonizers of the isthmus inflicted genocide upon the local indigenous population, known as the Cueva, through direct and indirect means. A regional slave trade was carried out by the colonizing forces in the early 16th century across Central America. Deadly working conditions, wars of conquest, and the destruction of indigenous communities and infrastructure resulted in the complete destruction and dispersal of indigenous peoples from the most heavily colonized parts of the isthmus. By 1550, less than 300 indigenous people were counted in the cities of Panama, Nombre de Dios, and Nata combined. During the Spanish colonization of Peru, the isthmus developed into an important port of trade and became an administrative center for the conquests of both South and wider Central America.

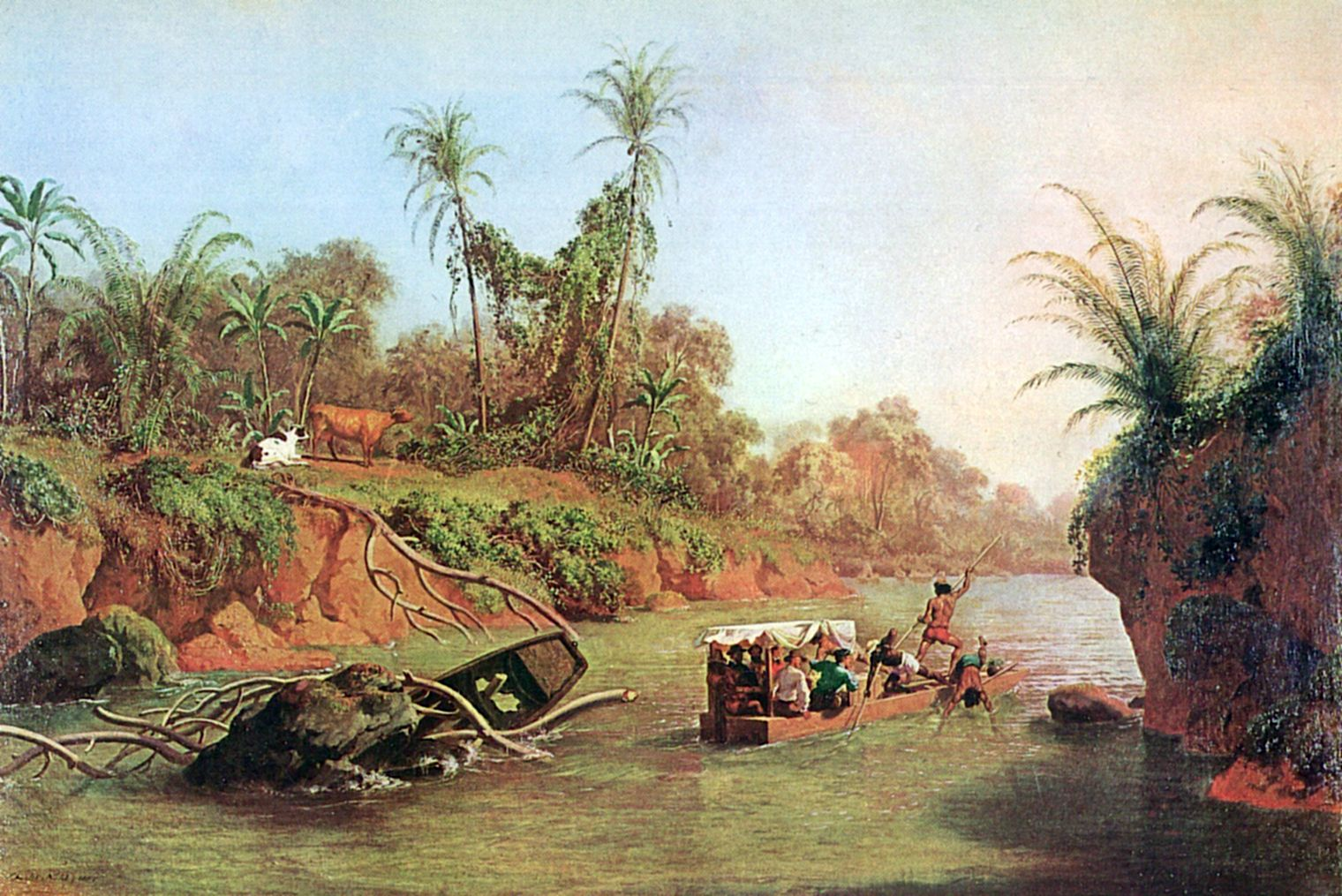
An 1850 oil painting by Charles Christian Nahl: The Isthmus of Panama on the Height of the Chagres River

Silver and gold from the viceroyalty of Peru were transported overland across the isthmus by the Spanish Silver Train to Porto Bello, where Spanish treasure fleets shipped them to Spain from 1707. Lionel Wafer spent four years between 1680 and 1684 among the Guna people. Scotland tried to establish a settlement in 1698 through the Darien scheme which was ultimately unsuccessful. The scheme was backed largely by investors of the Kingdom of Scotland in order to gain wealth and influence by establishing New Caledonia, a colony in the Darién Gap in the late 1690s. The plan was for the colony, located on the Gulf of Darién, to establish and manage an overland route to connect the Pacific and Atlantic Oceans. The backers knew that the first sighting of the Pacific Ocean by Balboa was after crossing the isthmus through Darién. The expedition also claimed sovereignty over "Crab Isle" (modern day Vieques, Puerto Rico) in 1698, yet sovereignty was short-lived. The attempt at settling the area did not go well; more than 80 percent of participants died within a year, and the settlement was abandoned twice.

The California gold rush, starting in 1849, brought a large increase in the transportation of people from the Atlantic to the Pacific. Steamships brought gold diggers from eastern U.S. ports, who trekked across the isthmus by foot, horse, and later rail. On the Pacific side, they boarded Pacific Mail Steamship Company vessels headed for San Francisco. Ferdinand de Lesseps, the developer of the Suez Canal, started a Panama Canal Company in 1880 that went bankrupt in 1889 in the Panama scandals. In 1902–1904, the United States forced Colombia to grant independence to the Department of the Isthmus, bought the remaining assets of the Panama Canal Company, and finished the canal in 1914.

== Geology ==
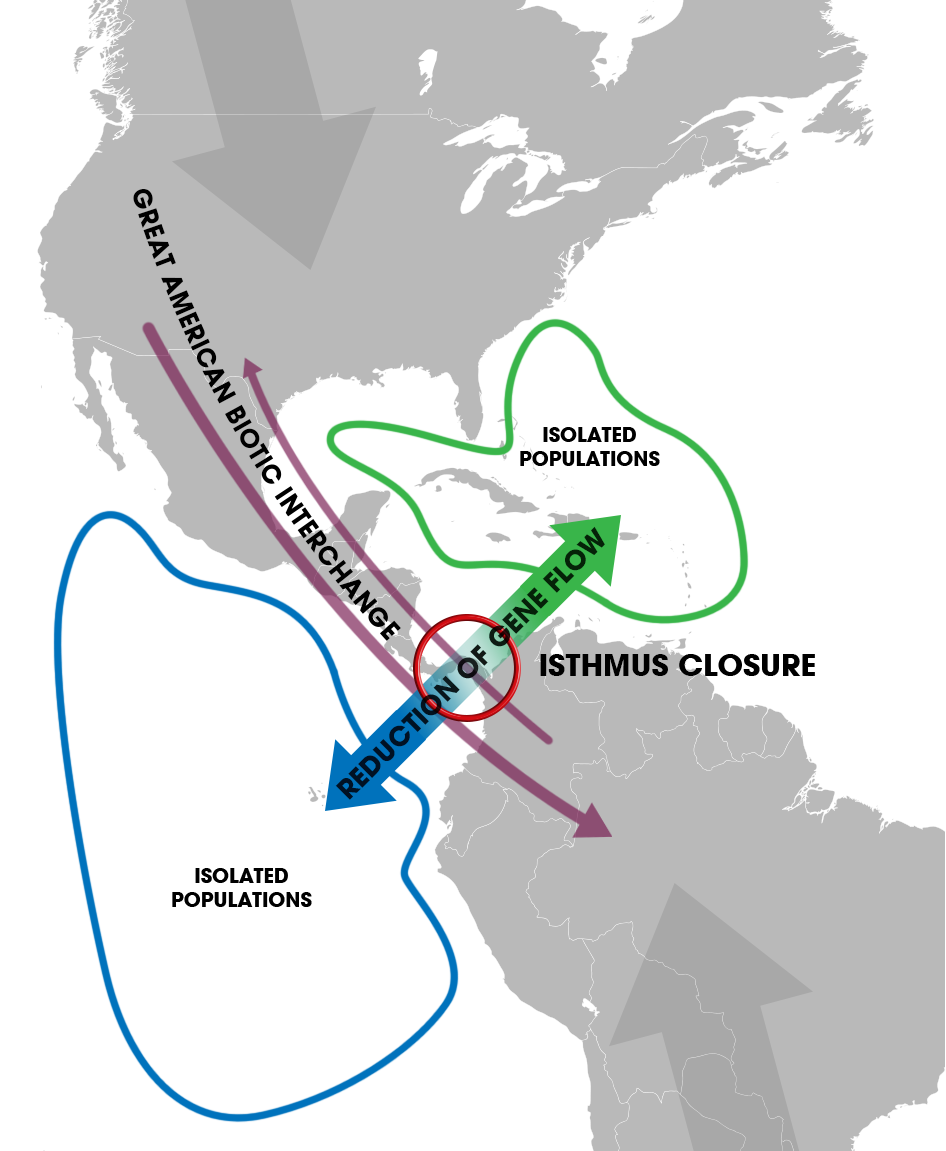
The closure of the isthmus led to allopatric speciation events of marine organisms isolated on each side (blue and green). Terrestrial species also migrated between the two continents (the Great American Biotic Interchange) upon the formation of a passable land bridge.

A significant body of water (referred to as the Central American Seaway) once separated the continents of North and South America, allowing the waters of the Pacific and Atlantic Oceans to mix freely. Beneath the surface, two plates of the Earth's crust were slowly colliding, forcing the Cocos plate to slide under the Caribbean plate. The pressure and heat caused by this collision led to the formation of underwater volcanoes, some of which grew large enough to form islands. Meanwhile, movement of the two tectonic plates was also pushing up the sea floor, eventually forcing some areas above sea level.

Over time, massive amounts of sediment from North and South America filled the gaps between the newly forming islands. Over millions of years, the sediment deposits added to the islands until the gap was completely filled. However, an article in Science magazine states that zircon crystals in middle Miocene bedrock from northern Colombia indicate that by 10 Ma, it is likely that instead of islands, a full isthmus between the North and South American continents had already formed where the Central American Seaway had been previously. A genomic study of army ants also suggests that the isthmus emerged millions of years earlier than had long been thought. The Isthmus of Panama is not the only part of Central America that has been low lying in the last tens of millions of years. This means the dates of first closure and final closure of the Central American Seaway (before it was artificially reopened to a degree by the Panama Canal) are likely to remain controversial. Some experts have proposed 15 Ma as the date of first closure, while others suggest that final closure might be more recent, based on genetic drift data for black mangroves along the Atlantic and Pacific coasts.

The process of formation of the isthmus and its implications are geologically and ecologically more nuanced. There is isotopic and carbonate deposition rate evidence that deep water connections below 1,800 m (5,900 ft) were broken between the Atlantic and Pacific by between 12 and 9.2 Ma. However exchange of surface water so as to maintain western Atlantic salinity at eastern Pacific values continued until about 4.6 Ma, with current Caribbean values being reached by about 4.2 Ma, although there seems to have been a last definite temporary breach as recently as 2.45 Ma. The ocean sediments between the volcanoes on the isthmus seem to have been laid down as recently as 3.1 Ma, and the exchange of organism gene pools between the two oceans appears to have continued until about 3 Ma as well. The largest exchange of animals over the land bridge only happened after this time, although some species had made the crossing earlier, perhaps by rafting or brief periods of connection separated by periods of a high water flow between an arc of volcanic islands not conducive to swimming or rafting.

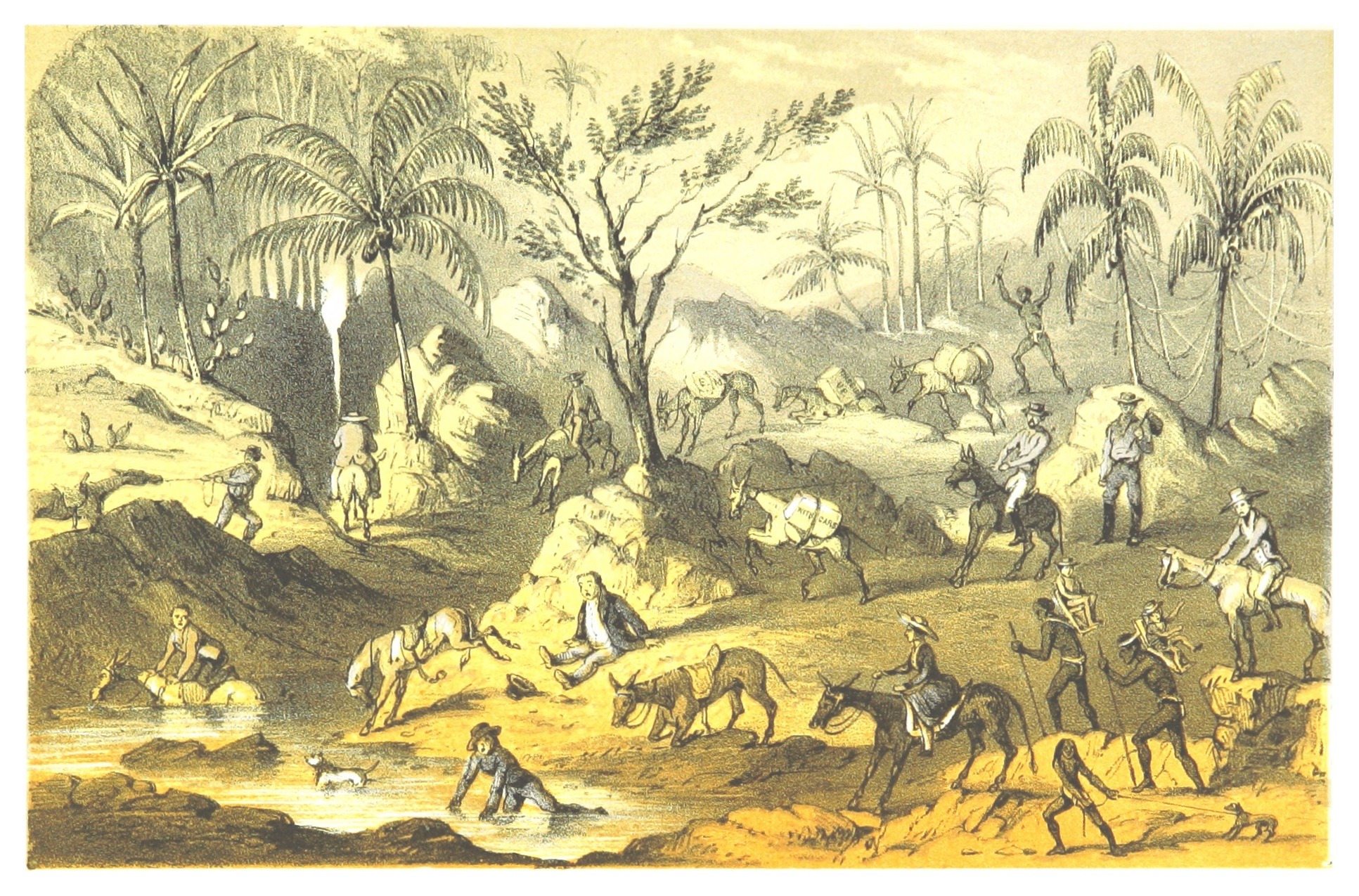
Francis Samuel Marryat, Crossing The Isthmus Of Panama, 1855

Evidence also suggests that the creation of this land mass and the subsequent warm, wet weather over northern Europe resulted in the formation of a large Arctic ice cap and contributed to the current ice age. That warm currents can lead to glacier formation may seem counterintuitive, but heated air flowing over the warm Gulf Stream can hold more moisture. The result is increased precipitation that contributes to snow pack.

The formation of the isthmus played a major role in biodiversity on the planet. The bridge made it easier for animals and plants to migrate between the two continents, known as the Great American Interchange. For instance, in North America, the opossum, armadillo, and porcupine all trace back to ancestors that came across the land bridge from South America. Likewise, bears, cats, dogs, horses, llamas, and raccoons all made the trek south across the isthmus.

== Biosphere ==
As the connecting bridge between two vast land masses, the Panamanian biosphere is filled with overlapping fauna and flora from both North and South America. There are, for example, over 978 species of birds in the isthmus area. The tropical climate also encourages a myriad of large and brightly colored species, insects, amphibians, birds, fish, and reptiles. Divided along its length by a mountain range, the weather is generally wet on the Atlantic side but has a clearer division into wet and dry seasons on the Pacific side.

Notable past (purple) and current (orange) land bridges on a bathymetric equirectangular projection centred on 45° E

== See also ==
- Isthmo-Colombian Area
- Postage stamps and postal history of the Canal Zone
