= Cativá =

- Corregimiento
- Location within Panama
- Coordinates: 9°21′36″N 79°50′24″W
- Country: Panama
- Province: Colón
- District: Colón

Area
  - Land: 23.1 km^{2} (8.9 sq mi)

Population (2023)
  - Corregimiento: 37,000
  - Rank: 14th in Panama
  - Density: 1,494.5/km^{2} (3,871/sq mi)
  - Urban (Township): 34,834
- Time zone: UTC−5 (EST)

Cativá is a corregimiento in Colón District, Colón Province, Panama, with a population of 34,558 as of 2010. Its population as of 1990 was 19,101; its population as of 2000 was 26,621.
