= Achiote, Colón =

Achiote
- Corregimiento
- Location within Panama
- Coordinates: 9.2228°N 80.0192°W
- Country: Panama
- Province: Colón
- District: Chagres

Area
  - Land: 40.3 km^{2} (15.6 sq mi)

Population (2010)
  - Total: 771
  - Density: 19.1/km^{2} (49/sq mi)
- Population density calculated based on land area.
- Time zone: UTC−5 (EST)

Achiote is a corregimiento in Chagres District, Colón Province, Panama with a population of 771 as of 2010. Its population as of 1990 was 755; its population as of 2000 was 784.
