= La Encantada, Colón =

La Encantada
- Corregimiento
- Location within Panama
- Coordinates: 9.1000°N 80.2000°W
- Country: Panama
- Province: Colón
- District: Chagres

Area
  - Land: 134.5 km^{2} (51.9 sq mi)

Population (2010)
  - Total: 2,561
  - Density: 19/km^{2} (49/sq mi)
- Population density calculated based on land area.
- Time zone: UTC−5 (EST)

La Encantada is a corregimiento in Chagres District, Colón Province, Panama with a population of 2,561 as of 2010. Its population as of 1990 was 2,532; its population as of 2000 was 2,523.
