= Quango (disambiguation) =

Quango or Qango may refer to:

- Quango, an acronym meaning "quasi-autonomous non-governmental organisation"
- Quango Music Group, a music label
- Quando Quango, a Manchester, England-based new-wave dance project
- Qango (band), an English progressive rock band
- Quango River, 19th-century spelling of Kwango River

== See also ==
- Cuango (disambiguation)
