= Quando =

Quando (Italian for 'When') may refer to:

- "Quando", 1960 song by Luigi Tenco
  - "Quando", 1970 cover of Luigi Tenco's song by Wess
- "Quando quando quando", 1962 song by Tony Renis, and several covers thereof
- "Quando", song by Pino Daniele, 1991
- Quando, 2018 EP by Davi Sabbag
- "Quando", 2021 song by Arisa with Michele Bravi
- Quando, 2023 film by Walter Veltroni

== See also ==
- Cuando (disambiguation)
