= Garrote, Colón =

Coordinates: 9.6000°N 79.5833°W

Puerto Lindo o Garrote
- Corregimiento
- Location within Panama
- Country: Panama
- Province: Colón
- District: Portobelo

Area
  - Land: 23.7 km^{2} (9.2 sq mi)

Population (2010)
  - Total: 869
  - Density: 36.6/km^{2} (95/sq mi)
- Population density calculated based on land area.
- Time zone: UTC−5 (EST)

Puerto Lindo o Garrote is a corregimiento in Portobelo District, Colón Province, Panama with a population of 869 as of 2010. Its population as of 1990 was 591; its population as of 2000 was 721.
