= Santa Rosa, Colón =

Coordinates: 9.1833°N 79.6500°W

Santa Rosa
- Corregimiento
- Location within Panama
- Country: Panama
- Province: Colón
- District: Colón

Area
  - Land: 26.8 km^{2} (10.3 sq mi)

Population (2010)
  - Total: 987
  - Density: 36.8/km^{2} (95/sq mi)
- Population density calculated based on land area.
- Time zone: UTC−5 (EST)

Santa Rosa is a corregimiento in Colón District, Colón Province, Panama with a population of 987 as of 2010. Its population as of 1990 was 533; its population as of 2000 was 735.
