= Escobal =

- Corregimiento
- Location within Panama
- Coordinates: 9°9′0″N 79°57′36″W
- Country: Panama
- Province: Colón
- District: Colón

Area
  - Land: 81.3 km^{2} (31.4 sq mi)

Population (2010)
  - Total: 2,388
  - Density: 29.4/km^{2} (76/sq mi)
- Population density calculated based on land area.
- Time zone: UTC−5 (EST)

Escobal is a corregimiento in Colón District, Colón Province, Panama with a population of 2,388 as of 2010. Its population as of 1990 was 1,964; its population as of 2000 was 2,181. Escobal is situated on the shore of Lake Gatun.
