= Spanish Silver Train =

South American trail of the Spanish colony in the 16th-17th century

The Spanish Silver Train was an improvised trail used to transport silver from Potosí, Peru across the isthmus of Panama in order to ship it to Spain via the Spanish treasure fleet. The silver was usually unloaded in Panama City, then put in mule trains and taken first to Nombre de Dios, and then, following the demise of that city in the late sixteenth century, to Portobello. The Silver Train was a prime target for English, Dutch, and French privateers in the sixteenth and seventeenth century. Francis Drake and Guillaume Le Testu, a French privateer, succeeded in capturing the train.

The trail, called Camino de Cruces in the eastern part and more generally El Camino Real still exists in places and has paving, though a full hike across Panama can take several days. Shorter trips are possible.
