= San Juan, Colón =

San Juan
- Corregimiento
- Location within Panama
- Country: Panama
- Province: Colón
- District: Colón

Area
  - Land: 41.2 km^{2} (15.9 sq mi)

Population (2010)
  - Total: 17,430
  - Density: 422.6/km^{2} (1,095/sq mi)
- Population density calculated based on land area.
- Time zone: UTC−5 (EST)

San Juan is a corregimiento in Colón District, Colón Province, Panama with a population of 17,430 as of 2010. Its population as of 1990 was 8,716; its population as of 2000 was 13,325.
