= Iglesia de San Felipe, Portobelo =

Coordinates: 9.5541°N 79.6546°W

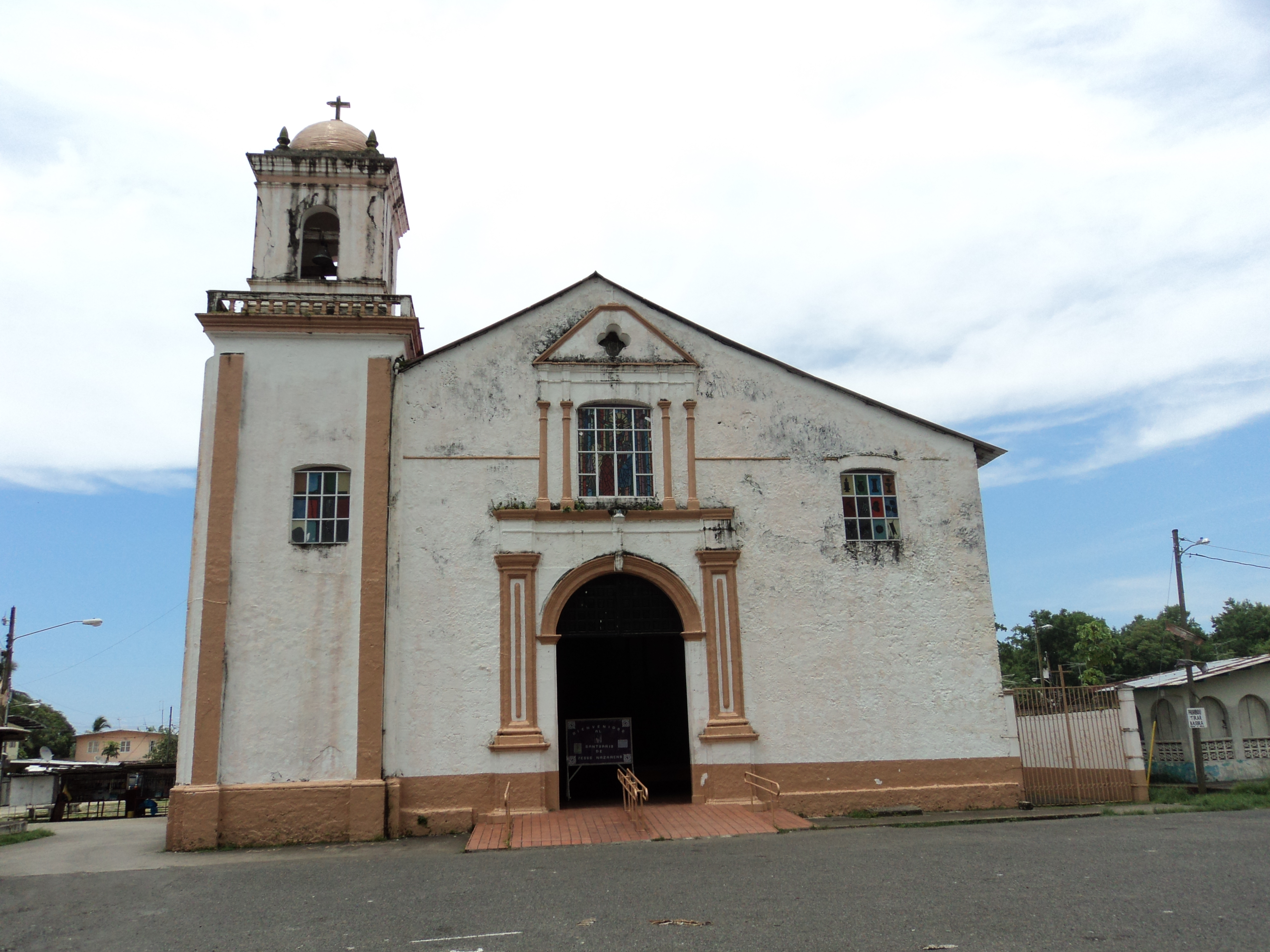
Iglesia de San Felipe

The Iglesia de San Felipe (English: Church of St Philip, also known as the Black Christ Church) is a Catholic church in Portobelo, Panama. Built in 1814, it houses a statue of Cristo Negro ("Black Christ"), which was found on the shores of the harbour.

== Background ==
Iglesia de San Felipe is located in Portobelo, a block to the east of Real Aduana. It is situated near the ruined 16th-century Capilla de San Juan de Dios. The Iglesia de San Felipe, a large white-painted building, was the last structure built by Spain before leaving Panama. After the Cristo Negro statue was constructed in 1814, it was installed in the church. The statue is adorned in various gowns; these are preserved at the Museo del Cristo Negro (Black Christ Museum), which is situated at the Iglesia de San Juan de Dios.

== Festival ==
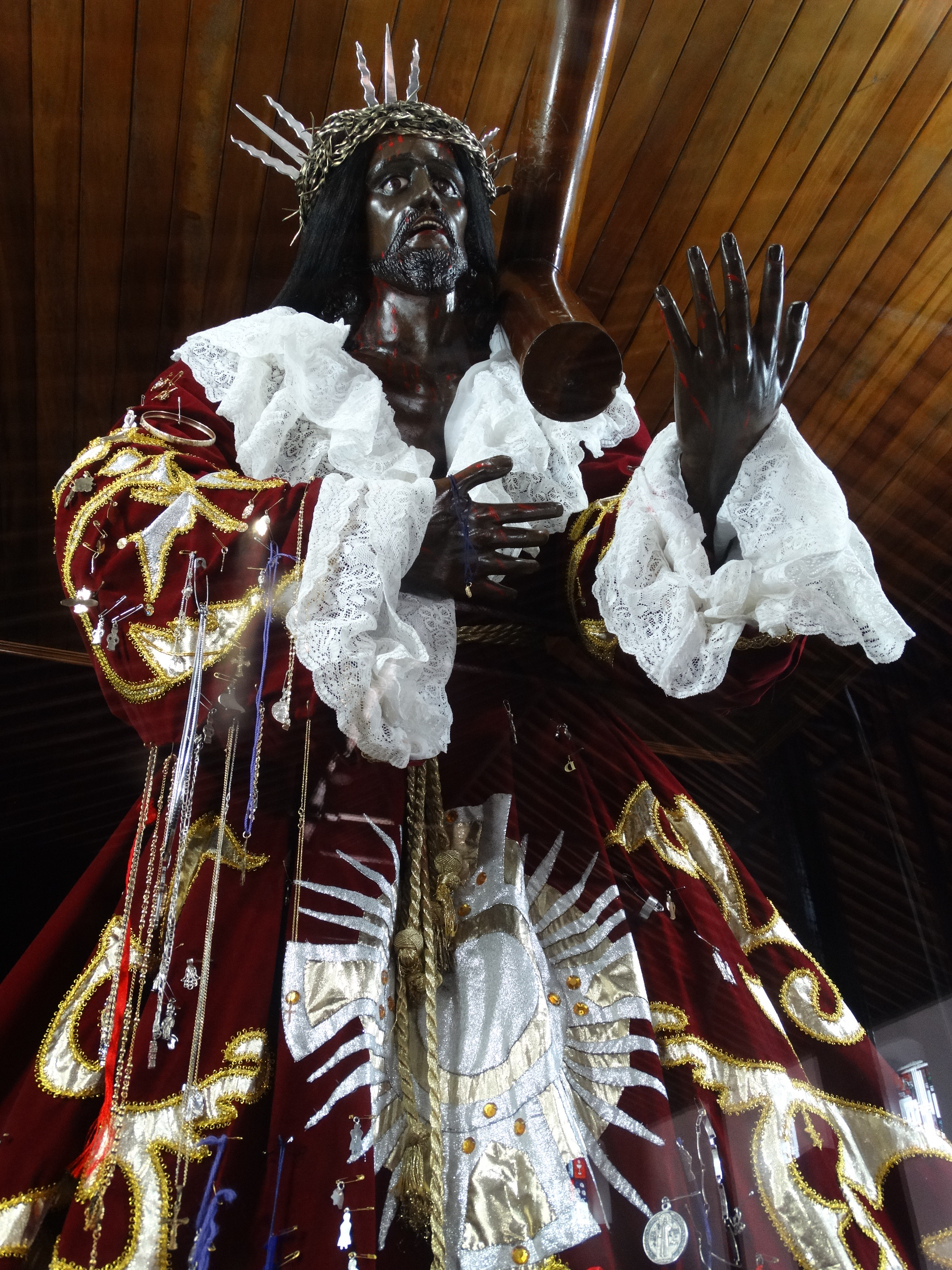
Christo Negro

The church's annual festival, the Black Christ Festival, is the biggest religio-cultural celebration in Portobelo. It is celebrated on October 21, a festival day formally known and observed as the "Feast Day of the Cristo de Portobelo". On this occasion, the number of pilgrims to the church can reach 60,000. People who are sick attend the festival praying for a cure of their illness. On the festival day, the image of Cristo Negro is shifted from its position on the church altar to a central space in the building. After the move, the image is adorned with a new, richly-designed robe in red wine color. One such robe is stated to have been donated by Roberto Durán who was the boxing champion from Panama. Mass is held in the church on the festival day from 6 p.m. till 8 p.m. After the Mass, the statue is carried by a group of 80 men by procession through the town's streets. The group of men who carry the image of Christ adopt the Spanish practice of swaying slowly and moving using a "three-steps-forward-and two-steps-backward format". Every member of this group has shaved his head, is barefoot, and wears a purple gown. Though a pious occasion, a carnival type of atmosphere prevails. At the midnight hour, the procession is brought to a halt and the statue is carried back into the church.

== Gallery ==
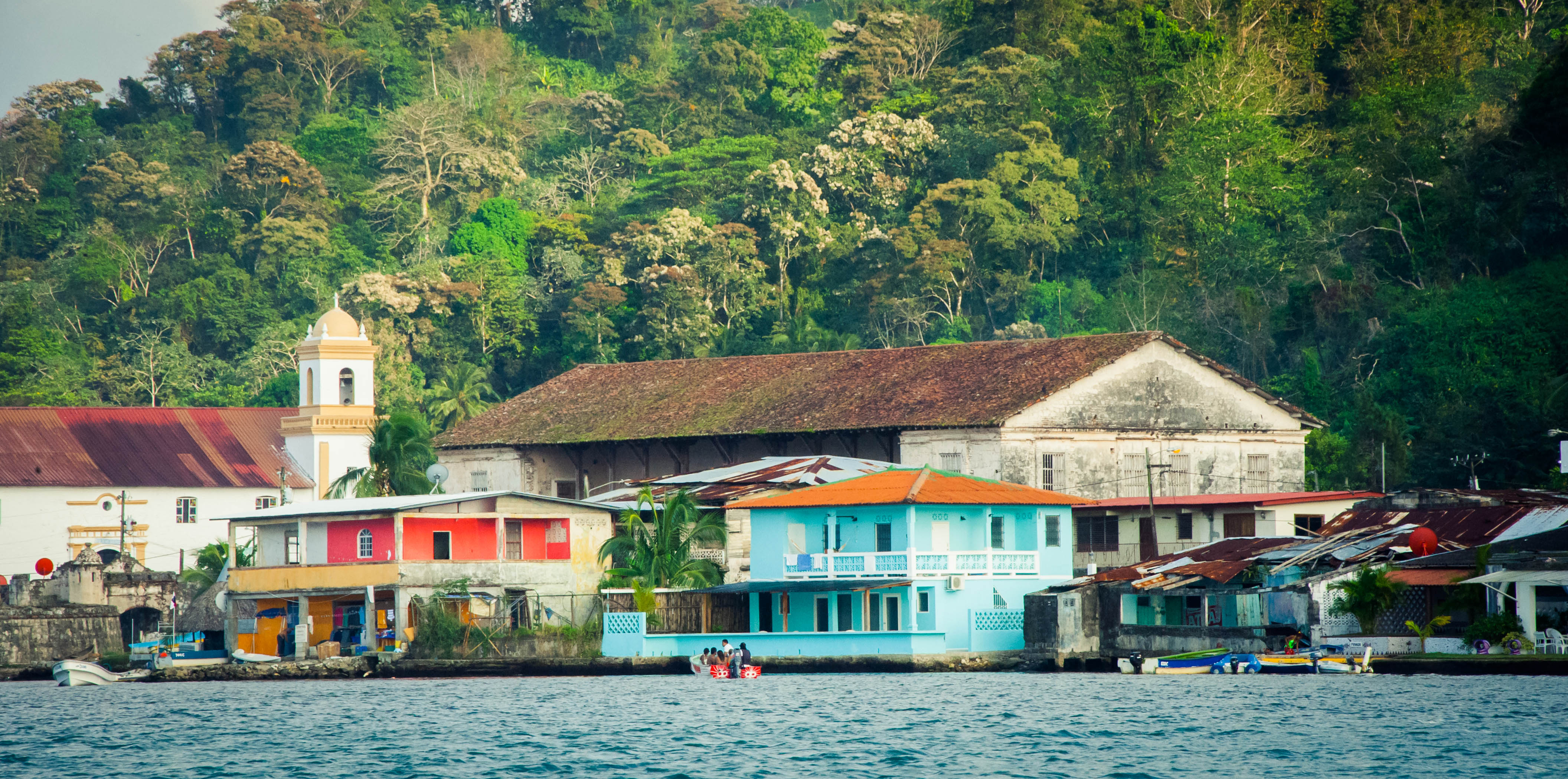
The church within the La Aduana neighborhood

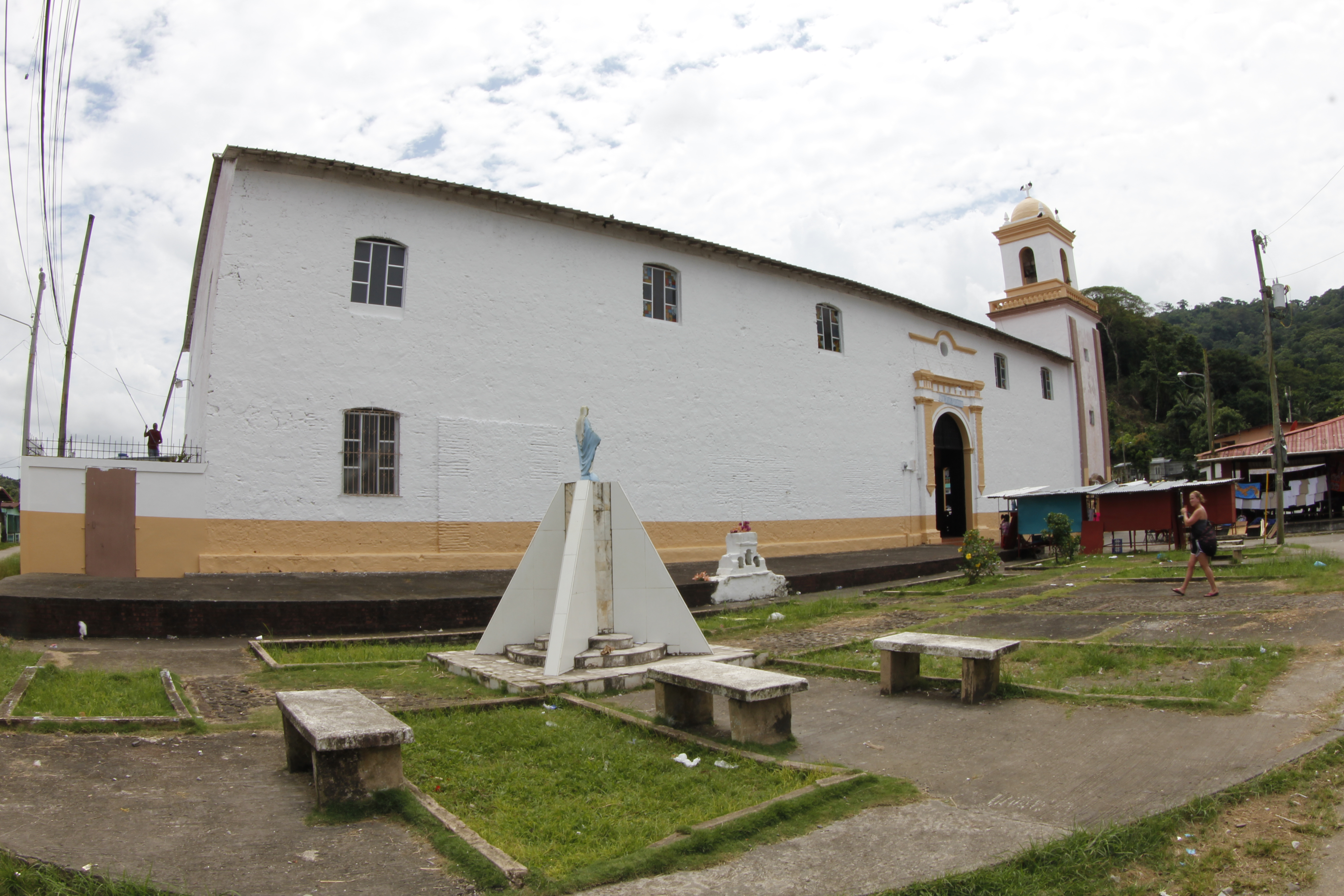
Exterior side view

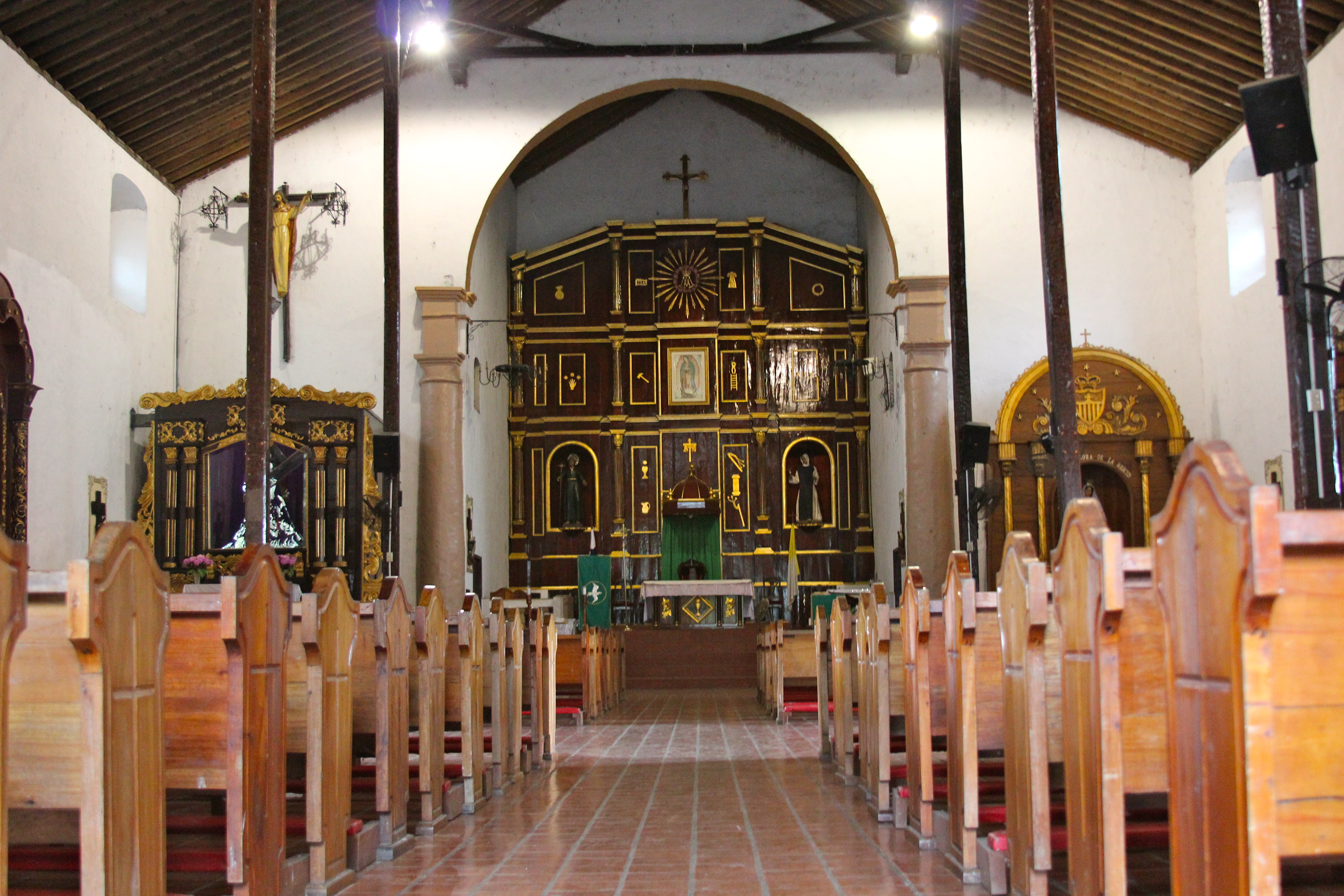
Interior view

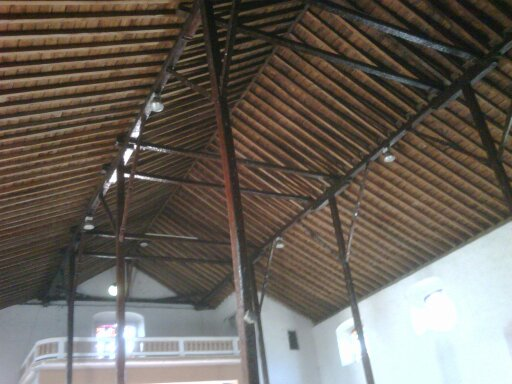
Ceiling

== Bibliography ==
- Friar, William (9 July 2013). Moon Spotlight Panama City & the Panama Canal. Avalon Travel. ISBN 978-1-59880-877-3.
- Katzman, Patricia (1 November 2005). Panama. Hunter Publishing, Inc. ISBN 978-1-58843-529-3.
- Melton, J. Gordon (13 September 2011). Religious Celebrations: An Encyclopedia of Holidays, Festivals, Solemn Observances, and Spiritual Commemorations. ABC-CLIO. ISBN 978-1-59884-205-0.
- Soley, La Verne M. Seales (30 December 2008). Culture and Customs of Panama. ABC-CLIO. ISBN 978-0-313-05636-9.
- Stallings, Doug (15 October 2012). Fodor's Caribbean Ports of Call. Fodor's. p. 213. ISBN 978-0-307-92940-2.
