= Ciricito =

Coordinates: 9.0333°N 80.0833°W

- Corregimiento
- Location within Panama
- Country: Panama
- Province: Colón
- District: Colón

Area
  - Land: 64.3 km^{2} (24.8 sq mi)

Population (2010)
  - Total: 2,900
  - Density: 45.1/km^{2} (117/sq mi)
- Population density calculated based on land area.
- Time zone: UTC−5 (EST)

Ciricito is a corregimiento in Colón District, Colón Province, Panama with a population of 2,900 as of 2010. Its population as of 1990 was 2,108; its population as of 2000 was 2,402.
