= Cuango River =

Cuango River may refer to:

- Kwango River, Democratic Republic of Congo/Angola, or;
- Rio Cuanga, near Cuango, Panama.

== See also ==
- Cuando River
