= Miguel de la Borda =

- Corregimiento
- Location within Panama
- Coordinates: 9.1500°N 80.3000°W
- Country: Panama
- Province: Colón
- District: Donoso

Area
  - Land: 318.1 km^{2} (122.8 sq mi)

Population (2010)
  - Total: 2,326
  - Density: 7.3/km^{2} (19/sq mi)
- Population density calculated based on land area.
- Time zone: UTC−5 (EST)

Miguel de la Borda is a corregimiento in Donoso District, Colón Province, Panama with a population of 2,326 as of 2010. It is the seat of Donoso District. Its population as of 1990 was 2,218; its population as of 2000 was 2,052.
