= Cristóbal, Colón =

Cristóbal Corregimiento
- County
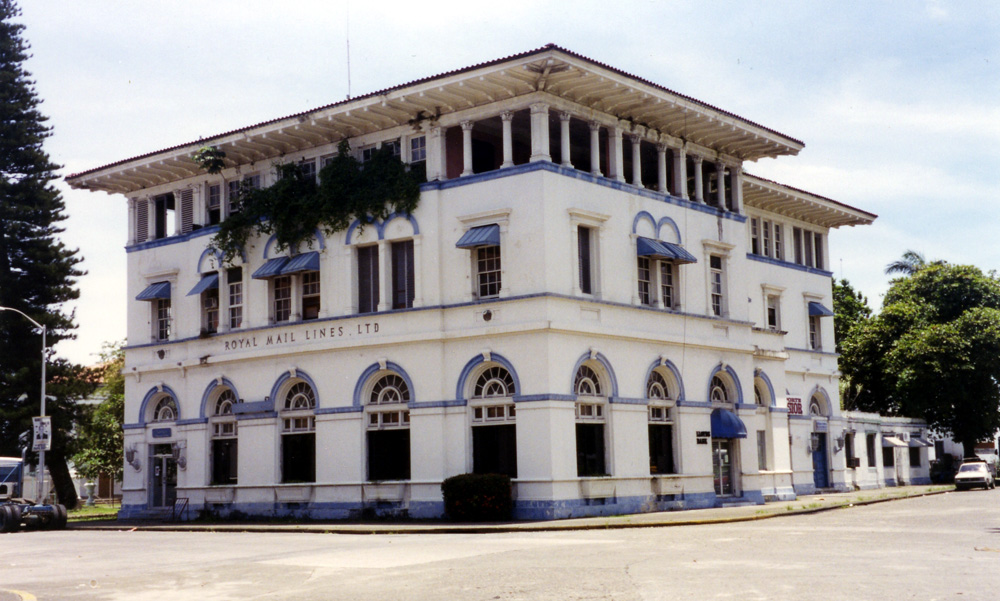
- Cristóbal's Bldg. 1104

- Location within Panama
- Coordinates: 9°21′N 79°54′W
- Country: Panama
- Province: Colón
- District: Colón

Area
  - Land: 428.5 km^{2} (165.4 sq mi)

Population (2010)
  - Total: 49,422
  - Density: 115.3/km^{2} (299/sq mi)
- Population density calculated based on land area.
- Time zone: UTC−5 (EST)

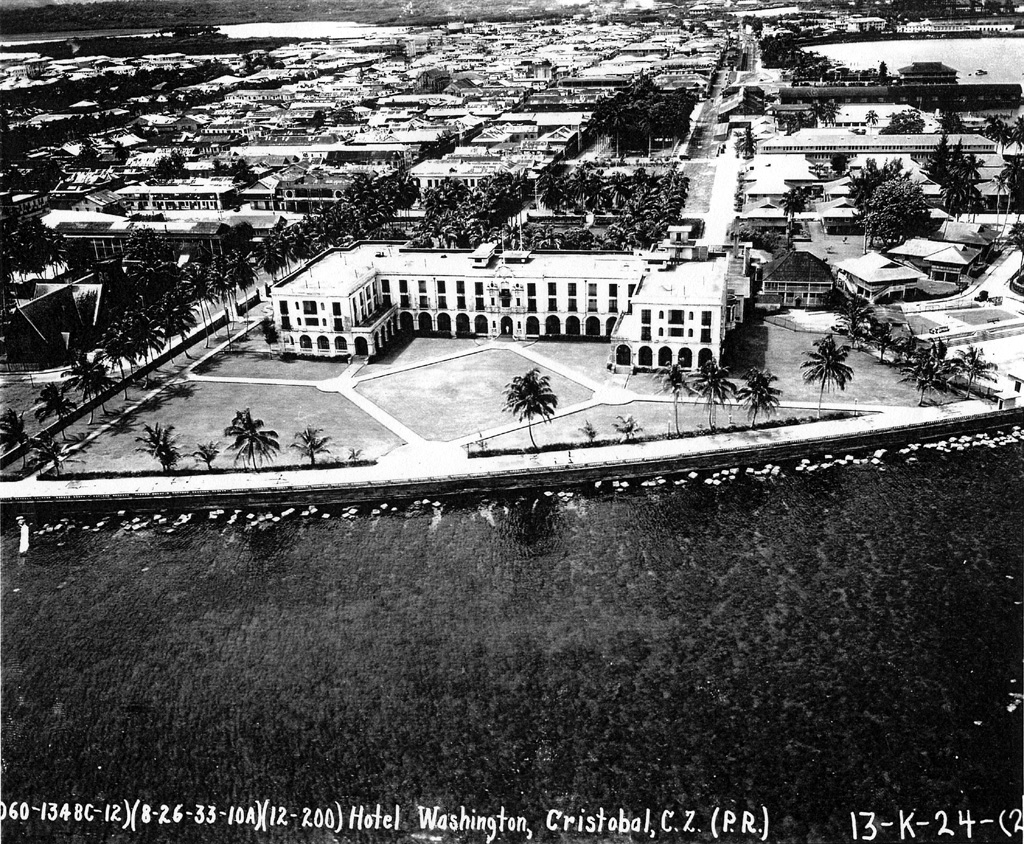
Hotel Washington, June 1938

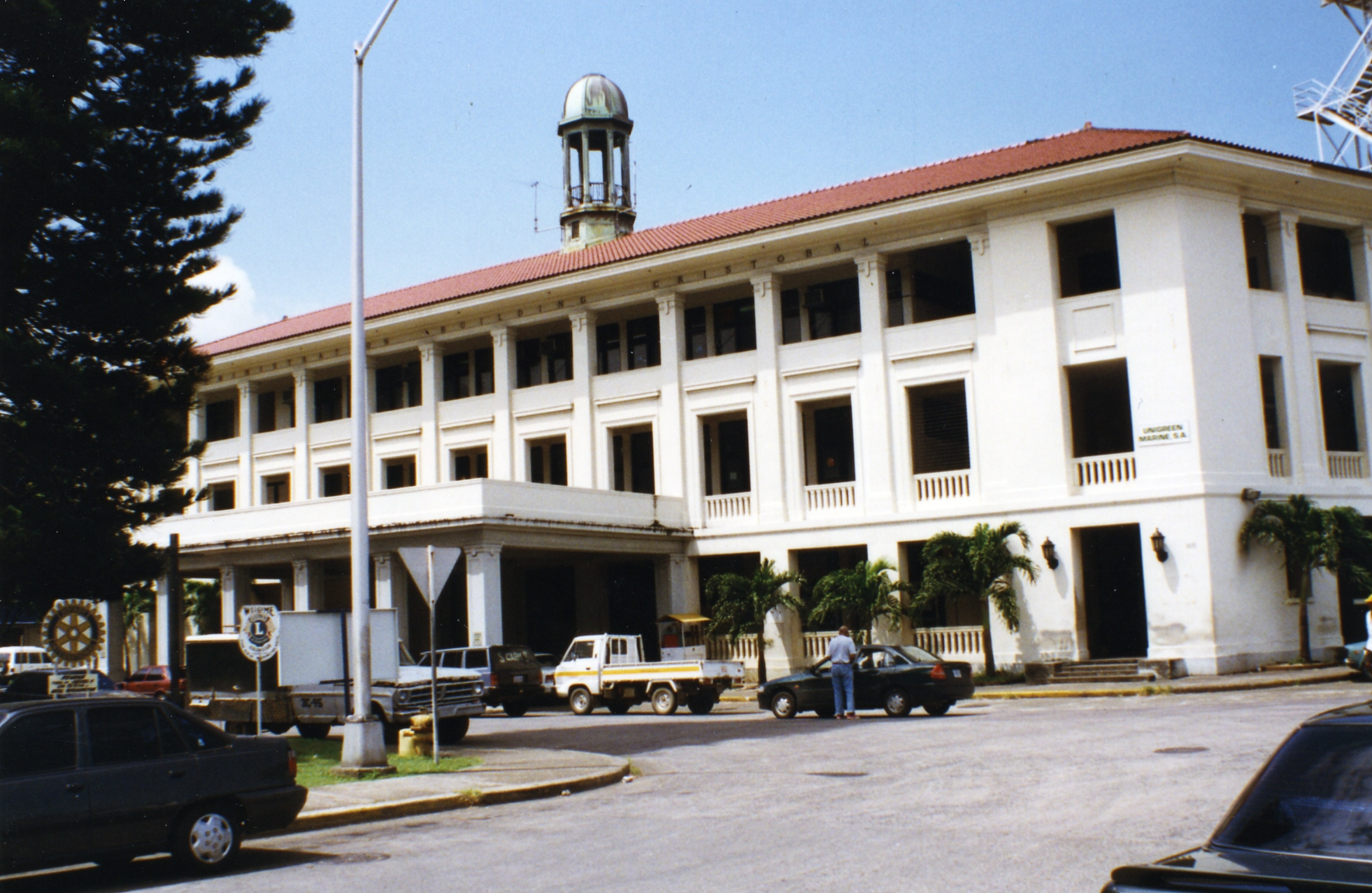
Cristóbal's Administration Building, July 1997

Cristóbal is a port town and corregimiento in Colón District, Colón Province, Panama. The corregimiento has a population of 49,422 as of 2010. The town is located on the western edge of Manzanillo Island, on the Atlantic side of the Panama Canal. Cristóbal Colón is the Spanish translation for Christopher Columbus, the Genovese explorer for whom these places were named.

== Early history ==
What came to be known as "Old Cristóbal," and today consists of the port of Cristóbal, was first built by the Panama Railroad Company in the 1850s at the time they dredged part of the 650 acres (2.6 km^{2}) of virgin swamp on Manzanillo Island to build their headquarters and port of arrival for railway travelers. In the 1880s, the French Inter-Oceanic Canal Company arrived to find the port of Colón (then Aspinwall) just a few streets wide and long while the rest of Manzanillo Island was still a swamp. They used soil from their canal excavation works to create a landfill on a coral reef adjacent to the Panama Railroad's area of Colon. This new landfill area, upon which the French built their facilities, was called Christophe Colombe, a name which was translated in Spanish as Cristóbal Colón.

In 1904, after Panama's US-backed declaration of independence from Colombia, the Canal Commission set up its provisional headquarters in Cristóbal. By then, the United States had purchased the French Canal enterprise's assets in Panama and had secured use and control of the Canal Zone "in perpetuity." The Panama Railroad's assets also came under Canal Zone control, and its facilities became part of the Canal Zone town of Cristóbal.

== Cristóbal, CZ ==
Cristóbal was of vital importance to the American plan to build the Panama Canal. Much like the city of Colón (formerly Aspinwall) had been during the American construction of the Panama Railroad, Cristobal was the port of entry for construction equipment and materials, most canal workers, and supplies and provisions for them and their dependents. High priority was given to building up the town beyond the existing French and Panama Railroad facilities.

By April 1906 Cristóbal had a population of 2,101, and 489 of these were American. Just a year later the population had topped 4,000, a quarter of which were American. Construction of facilities for gold roll and silver roll employees (terms that respectively designated mostly white Americans and mostly West Indian laborers working on the construction of the Canal) was underway and housing was expanded, though many bachelors and silver roll employees were housed in box cars given the lack of sufficient housing throughout the Canal Zone. Also that year, the former French and Panama Railroad hospitals were consolidated and refurbished.

In 1907 the Cristóbal Women's Club was founded and fraternal orders for men, including Masonic and Elks lodges were active. Commissaries and clubhouses were built and very active. Construction of housing and facilities expanded northward. In 1913 the present-day Hotel Washington was built on the site of a former Panama Railroad building known as the Washington House. Cristobalites eventually had their own commissary, post office, police, fire and railroad stations, churches, yacht club, YMCA, VFW, American Legion, several fraternal lodges and a masonic temple.

After the Panama Canal's inauguration the port of Cristóbal's great piers were built and, shortly after, shipping companies moved into the area which came to be known as Steamship Row. At around the same time the northwestern tip of Manzanillo Island was converted into an artillery post named Fort De Lesseps, so new residential housing areas for US employees were needed. This required new planning for Cristóbal which was designed primarily for port activity, as headquarters for shipping agencies, freight handlers, banks, and the Canal Zone's Atlantic side civil administration center. A new residential section was built by expanding Cristobal along Colon Beach, through another massive landfill of northern Manzanillo Island's swamps. This new area came to be known as New Cristóbal.

New Cristóbal's construction progressed from 1917 to 1938, and involved filling in swamp areas beyond Cristóbal which allowed the city of Colón to expand too. As part of this expansion, a new Cristóbal elementary school was built in 1918 and Cristobal High School in 1933. This period coincided with the period of Colón's greatest economic prosperity. During these years the port of Cristóbal employed almost 2,000 employees .

The mid-1950s saw the greatest transformation of Cristobal. This change saw a drastic population shift of Cristobalites to new areas in Margarita and Coco Solo, and the redefinition of territorial boundaries which reduced the extension of the Canal Zone on Manzanillo Island. These changes came about as a result of the construction of the town of Margarita, the 1955 bilateral treaty, and the US Navy's transfer of its Coco Solo Station to the Canal Zone government. Cristóbal's population in 1955 dropped to 562, and New Cristóbal's to 1,130.

Starting in late 1957, in compliance with the 1955 Treaty, five tracts of land totaling 48.5 acres (196,000 m^{2}) in Cristóbal and all of New Cristóbal were transferred to the Republic of Panama. Cristóbal High School was moved from New Cristobal to Coco Solo, the Colon Hospital was moved from Colon Beach to an area south of Coco Solo and France Field, the Hotel Washington came under Panamanian jurisdiction, and the Panama Railroad stations in Cristóbal and Panama City were relocated. Many of the properties transferred as a result of the 1955 Treaty had been owned by the Panama Railroad for over 100 years.

By the early 1960s, Cristóbal was almost exclusively a commercial and social area with few residents. Cristóbal was the target of anti-American protests throughout the early 1960s, and particularly after the Balboa "Flag Incident" in January 1964. New Cristóbal and Fort DeLesseps, now part of the Republic of Panama, became the most prestigious areas for Colón's citizens and for executives of the Bahía Las Minas Refinery. Other former Panama Railroad areas eventually fell into decline in the 1970s and 1980s, along with most of the rest of the city of Colón.

Starting in 1979, in compliance with the Torrijos-Carter Panama Canal Treaties of 1977, the Canal Zone was abolished and US control over the Panama Canal and the former Canal Zone began to be transferred to the Republic of Panama. Many areas in Cristóbal were among the first to be transferred, as was the Panama Railroad which ceased to operate in the early 1980s due to lack of maintenance. Its population as of 1990 was 15,178; its population as of 2000 was 37,426.

== Present-day Cristóbal ==
Cristóbal town is now part of the Colón urban area, though it is also the name of the district which encompasses the Atlantic Side portions of the former Panama Canal Zone.

=== Crime ===
Modern-day Cristóbal, like much of the city of Colón, has been beset with problems of increased crime and needed maintenance.

=== Sights ===
The architecture of much of what was once known as Steamship Row (the areas around Roosevelt Avenue, Terminal Street and Columbus Avenue) can still be appreciated, even if only for their historical significance. Other Cristóbal area landmarks such as the Hotel Washington, Christ Church by the Sea, and the St. Mary's Academy's Church of Our Lady of the Miraculous Medal are very well preserved and may be of interest to visitors.

=== Port ===
Cristóbal's port is thriving under private management while facing competition from other container ports built around Coco Solo.

== See also ==
- Postage stamps and postal history of the Canal Zone
- SS Conte Biancamano
- George, Washington
