= Coclé del Norte =

- Corregimiento
- Location within Panama
- Coordinates: 9.0833°N 80.5833°W
- Country: Panama
- Province: Colón
- District: Donoso

Area
  - Land: 929.9 km^{2} (359.0 sq mi)

Population (2010)
  - Total: 3,555
  - Density: 3.8/km^{2} (9.8/sq mi)
- Population density calculated based on land area.
- Time zone: UTC−5 (EST)

Coclé del Norte is a corregimiento in Donoso District, Colón Province, Panama with a population of 3,555 as of 2010. Its population as of 1990 was 2,377; its population as of 2000 was 2,386.
