= Playa Chiquita =

Coordinates: 9.5667°N 79.2833°W

- Corregimiento
- Location within Panama
- Country: Panama
- Province: Colón
- District: Santa Isabel

Area
  - Land: 117.5 km^{2} (45.4 sq mi)

Population (2010)
  - Total: 169
  - Density: 1.4/km^{2} (3.6/sq mi)
- Population density calculated based on land area.
- Time zone: UTC−5 (EST)

Playa Chiquita is a corregimiento in Santa Isabel District, Colón Province, Panama. As of 2010, it had a population of 169. By 1990, the population was 184 and as of 2000, the population was 187.
