= Buena Vista, Colón =

Coordinates: 9.2747°N 79.6953°W

Buena Vista
- Corregimiento
- Location within Panama
- Country: Panama
- Province: Colón
- District: Colón

Area
  - Land: 114.5 km^{2} (44.2 sq mi)

Population (2010)
  - Total: 14,285
  - Density: 124.8/km^{2} (323/sq mi)
- Population density calculated based on land area.
- Time zone: UTC−5 (EST)

Buena Vista is a corregimiento in Colón District, Colón Province, Panama with a population of 14,285 as of 2010. Its population as of 1990 was 7,547; its population as of 2000 was 10,428.
