= Nueva Providencia =

Coordinates: 9.2633°N 79.8156°W

- Corregimiento
- Location within Panama
- Country: Panama
- Province: Colón
- District: Colón

Area
  - Land: 17.3 km^{2} (6.7 sq mi)

Population (2010)
  - Total: 5,813
  - Density: 335.4/km^{2} (869/sq mi)
- Population density calculated based on land area.
- Time zone: UTC−5 (EST)

Nueva Providencia is a corregimiento in Colón District, Colón Province, Panama with a population of 5,813 as of 2010. Its population as of 1990 was 1,253; its population as of 2000 was 3,065.
