= Gobea =

- Corregimiento
- Location within Panama
- Coordinates: 9.1686°N 80.2489°W
- Country: Panama
- Province: Colón
- District: Donoso

Area
  - Land: 52.1 km^{2} (20.1 sq mi)

Population (2010)
  - Total: 794
  - Density: 15.2/km^{2} (39/sq mi)
- Population density calculated based on land area.
- Time zone: UTC−5 (EST)

Gobea is a corregimiento in Donoso District, Colón Province, Panama with a population of 794 as of 2010. Its population as of 1990 was 610; its population as of 2000 was 702.
