= Salamanca, Colón =

Coordinates: 9.3361°N 79.6025°W

Salamanca
- Corregimiento
- Location within Panama
- Country: Panama
- Province: Colón
- District: Colón

Area
  - Land: 195.3 km^{2} (75.4 sq mi)

Population (2023)
  - Total: 5,043
  - Density: 25.8/km^{2} (67/sq mi)
- Population density calculated based on land area.
- Time zone: UTC−5 (EST)

Salamanca is a corregimiento in Colón District, Colón Province, Panama surrounded by landscapes, home of the lake Alajuela which supplies with water to the Panama Canal way, with a population of 5,043 as of 2023. Its population as of 1990 was 2,675; its population as of 2000 was 2,920; its population as of 2010 was 3,881.
