= Viento Frío =

Coordinates: 9.5833°N 79.4000°W

- Corregimiento
- Location within Panama
- Country: Panama
- Province: Colón
- District: Santa Isabel

Area
  - Land: 39.4 km^{2} (15.2 sq mi)

Population (2010)
  - Total: 487
  - Density: 12.4/km^{2} (32/sq mi)
- Population density calculated based on land area.
- Time zone: UTC−5 (EST)

Viento Frío is a corregimiento in Santa Isabel District, Colón Province, Panama with a population of 487 as of 2010. Its population as of 1990 was 396; its population as of 2000 was 427.
