= Cacique, Colón =

Coordinates: 9.6167°N 79.6167°W

Cacique
- Corregimiento
- Location within Panama
- Country: Panama
- Province: Colón
- District: Portobelo

Area
  - Land: 11.4 km^{2} (4.4 sq mi)

Population (2010)
  - Total: 246
  - Density: 21.6/km^{2} (56/sq mi)
- Population density calculated based on land area.
- Time zone: UTC−5 (EST)

Cacique is a corregimiento in Portobelo District, Colón Province, Panama with a population of 246 as of 2010. Its population as of 1990 was 225; its population as of 2000 was 268.
