= Palmira, Colón =

Coordinates: 9.5474°N 79.2149°W

Palmira
- Corregimiento
- Location within Panama
- Country: Panama
- Province: Colón
- District: Santa Isabel

Area
  - Land: 176.9 km^{2} (68.3 sq mi)

Population (2010)
  - Total: 319
  - Density: 1.8/km^{2} (4.7/sq mi)
- Population density calculated based on land area.
- Time zone: UTC−5 (EST)

Palmira is a corregimiento in Santa Isabel District, Colón Province, Panama with a population of 319 as of 2010. Its population as of 1990 was 313; its population as of 2000 was 458.
