= María Chiquita =

- Corregimiento
- Location within Panama
- Coordinates: 9°26′24″N 79°45′36″W
- Country: Panama
- Province: Colón
- District: Portobelo

Area
  - Land: 90.5 km^{2} (34.9 sq mi)

Population (2010)
  - Total: 2,415
  - Density: 26.7/km^{2} (69/sq mi)
- Population density calculated based on land area.
- Time zone: UTC−5 (EST)

María Chiquita is a corregimiento in Portobelo District, Colón Province, Panama with a population of 2,415 as of 2010. Its population as of 1990 was 1,420; its population as of 2000 was 2,053.
