= Sabanitas =

- Corregimiento
- Location within Panama
- Coordinates: 9°20′24″N 79°48′0″W
- Country: Panama
- Province: Colón
- District: Colón

Area
  - Land: 11.6 km^{2} (4.5 sq mi)

Population (2010)
  - Total: 19,052
  - Density: 1,646.2/km^{2} (4,264/sq mi)
- Population density calculated based on land area.
- Time zone: UTC−5 (EST)

Sabanitas is a corregimiento in Colón District, Colón Province, Panama with a population of 19,052 as of 2010. Its population as of 1990 was 13,729; its population as of 2000 was 17,073.
