= El Guásimo, Colón =

El Guásimo
- Corregimiento
- Location within Panama
- Coordinates: 9.1167°N 80.2000°W
- Country: Panama
- Province: Colón
- District: Donoso

Area
  - Land: 291 km^{2} (112 sq mi)

Population (2010)
  - Total: 2,843
  - Density: 9.8/km^{2} (25/sq mi)
- Population density calculated based on land area.
- Time zone: UTC−5 (EST)

El Guásimo is a corregimiento in Donoso District, Colón Province, Panama with a population of 2,843 as of 2010. Its population as of 1990 was 1,992; its population as of 2000 was 2,350.
