= Salud, Colón =

Salud
- Corregimiento
- Location within Panama
- Coordinates: 9.2081°N 80.1303°W
- Country: Panama
- Province: Colón
- District: Chagres

Area
  - Land: 106.2 km^{2} (41.0 sq mi)

Population (2010)
  - Total: 2,162
  - Density: 20.4/km^{2} (53/sq mi)
- Population density calculated based on land area.
- Time zone: UTC−5 (EST)

Salud is a corregimiento in Chagres District, Colón Province, Panama with a population of 2,162 as of 2010. Its population as of 1990 was 2,085; its population as of 2000 was 1,895.
