= El Guabo, Colón =

El Guabo
- Corregimiento
- Location within Panama
- Coordinates: 9.0833°N 80.0833°W
- Country: Panama
- Province: Colón
- District: Chagres

Area
  - Land: 53.3 km^{2} (20.6 sq mi)

Population (2010)
  - Total: 1,330
  - Density: 24.9/km^{2} (64/sq mi)
- Population density calculated based on land area.
- Time zone: UTC−5 (EST)

El Guabo is a corregimiento in Chagres District, Colón Province, Panama with a population of 1,330 as of 2010. Its population as of 1990 was 1,191; its population as of 2000 was 1,180.
