= Sandra Eleta =

Panamanian photographer

Sandra Eleta is an artist and photographer. Eleta was born in Panama City in Republic of Panama on September 4, 1942, as Sandra Eleta Boyd. Eleta studied Fine Arts at Finch College and then later studied Social Investigation in The New School of Social Research in New York. Her study of Social Investigation lead her to tell the life stories of a variety of different people in varying social classes throughout Latin America. In the 1970s, she took courses at the International Center of Photography (ICP) in New York with Ken Heyman and George Tice, who were both photographers. She then went on to teach at the Universidad Nacional de Costa Rica. She lived and worked in Portobelo, Panama for many years, since the mid-1970s.

She is known for is a photograph she captured in 1977 in Panama, entitled "The One with the Feather Duster". It was showcased at the Hammer Museum in Los Angeles during the Radical Women in Latin American Art exhibit in Winter of 2017.

== Artistic collections ==
Servitude Series

In her description of this series Eleta writes, "Two continents, two countries, two residences and two generations bear silent witness … In this series I sought to discover the differences between the older and younger generations as they related to servitude. Spain Victor finds his personal identity within his role as servant. He is the personification of his art. For him, there is no division between his role and his being. There is no questioning, only a humoristic pride which dresses his person. Purit a (later infiltrated as a terrorist) is one who questions, one who challenges and defies: Her energy, like that of a caged feline was palpable, and could be felt thumping about the enormity of the house. What might she be contemplating? I often wandered....Panamá as Rosa polished the silver, each piece engraved with the family's coat of arms, she paused periodically to study her own reflection: Most of her life had been spent within the confines of this family residence, which she had grown to consider her own, given that she had scarcely known any other. During the United States' invasion of Panamá, Romi decided to grab a hunting rifle, which she found in my brother's closet. The people in our neighborhood were frightened, imagining seen Noriega's "dignity batallions [sic?]" looting and burning nearby houses. I had never witnessed such intensity in Romi as I did the moment she brandished that weapon. As I photographed her, I remember thinking: Honestly, who would she really like to shoot?".

Portobelo Series

In her description of the Portobelo series Eleta writes, "It could be said that with this series, my life and photography became one. When I arrived in Portobelo, in the early seventies', I began photographing those who engaged me in some profound way, who seemed to resonate that which I felt deepest within me. Naturally wanting to more, I drew nearer and dug deeper, hoping to fathom the very depths of their souls. I of course understood that I could not accomplish this alone, but eventually, winning their trust, they revealed themselves to me willingly, allowing their auras to repose in my lens. Then, much like an invitation to dance, we found ourselves locked in a mutual rhythm, completely unencumbered, completely in-tune. It was in this way the protagonist of this story revealed themselves to me: Josefa, a healer of the "evil eye," locally known as a "curandera"; Palanca, who only seemed to find solace in the arms of his grandmother, Ventura; Putulungo, the octopus fisherman, who much like his prey could instantly change his interior from light to dark; Dulce, a little girl light in years, but possessing all the wisdom and tenacity of her cimarrón ancestors; Catalina, Queen of the Congos. It could also be said, that with this series my photographic identity was born, and that as I came face to face with these images for the first time, I felt I was looking at myself, but from a renewed point of view (http://www.sandraeleta.com/en/collections.html).

== Solo exhibitions ==
- 2009 Gallérie Agathe Gaillard, Paris, France
- 2001 Ángeles Multiétnicos, Arteconsult Gallery, Panamá
- 1998 Por los caminos del Chagres: Los Emberás, hijos del río. PNUD, Panamá
- 1987 Burden Gallery, New York, New York
- 1985 Portobelo, Panamá. Photography. Photo gallery at The San Martín Theater, Buenos Aires, Argentina
- 1983 Gallérie Agathe Gaillard, Paris, Francia
- 1982 Portobelo viene al Museo, Museo de Arte Contemporáneo, Panamá
- 1980 Consejo Venezolano de Fotografía, Caracas, Venezuela
- 1979 Canon Photo Gallery, Amsterdam, Holland.
- 1976 “Ritos y Minorias”, Fotocentro Gallery, Madrid.

== Selected group exhibitions ==
- 2009 Photo Paris, Gallérie Agathe Gaillard, Paris, Francia
- 2006 Patrimonio Humano, Espacio Arte, Casco Antiguo San Felipe, Panamá
- 2003 Caminos del Maíz, Museo de Arte Contemporáneo, Panamá, Panamá
- 2003 Titanes, Galería La Bohème, Panamá, Panamá
- 2001 Festival Iberoamericano de Cadíz, España
- 2001 Obra reciente: Sandra Eleta & Gustavo Araujo, Arteconsult Gallery, Panamá, Panamá
- 1999 Panameños en la Bienal de Lima, Museo de Arte Contemporáneo, Panamá, Panamá
- 1999 Comanche, Brooke Alfaro & Sandra Eleta, Photography, artistic installation and video. Bienal de Lima, Perú
- 1999 MUA Instala, Mujeres en las Artes, Tegucigalpa, Honduras
- 1998 Raquel Bigio y Sandra Eleta, Galería Mateo Sariel, Panamá, Panamá
- 1998 XXVI Bienal de São Paulo, Brasil 1985 Portobelo y Sirenata en B, Teatro Nacional de Panamá, Panamá
- 1984 Bienal Latinoamericana de La Habana, Cuba
- 1984 Nikon, Photo Gallery, Zurich, Suiza
- 1982 Fotografie Lateinamerika, 1960–1980. Academie der Kunzt, Berlín, Alemania
- 1982 Contrast Gallery, Londres, Inglaterra
- 1982 Photografie Contemporaine Latinoamericaine, Centro Pompidou, Paris, Francia
- 1981 1st Latin-American Photography auction, Kunsthaus, Zurich, Switzerland
- 1981 Revelación, Revuelta y Ficción, Consejo Mejicano de Fotografía, México
- 1981 Segunda Muestra de Fotografía Latinoamericana Contemporánea, Museo de Arte Moderno, México, México
- 1979 Reincontres Photographiques d’Arles, Francia
- 1979 Cannon, Photo Gallery, Amsterdam, Holanda
- 1979 Venecia ’79- La Fotografía, Venecia, Italia
- 1978 Primera Muestra de Fotrografía Latinoamericana Contemporánea, Museo de Arte Moderno, Ciudad de México, México
- 1978 Ritos y Minorías, Galería Photocentro, Madrid, España
- 1976 WOMAN, The Institute of Spanish Art, New York, New York
- 1975 Center for Interamerican Relations, New York, New York

== Bibliography ==
=== Art books ===
- 1982 “NOSTALGIA DEL FUTURO”, Photography by Sandra Eleta and texts by Ernesto Cardenal, Editorial Germán Schultz, Alemania.
- 1991 “PORTOBELO”, Editorial Fotográfica La Azotea, Buenos Aires, Argentina. Primera edición 1985, Segunda edición 1991.
- 2004 “EL ABUELO DE MI ABUELA”, Photography by Sandra Eleta, with group creations by Grupo Casa Taller, Ciudad del Saber, Panamá
- 2005 “DARIÉN: LIBRO DE VIAJE”, Programa de las Naciones Unidas para el Desarrollo (PNUD) and Autoridad Nacional del Ambiente (ANAM).

=== Publications ===
Since the late 70's Eleta works independently with the ARCHIVES Agency, New York. Publishing her photographs in various magazines such as CAMARA in Switzerland and Aperture, New York. Her work has been reviewed in: Canto a la Realidad, Ediciones Lunwerg, Madrid; Dictionaire Mondiale de la Photographie, Ediciones Larousse, Paris; A History of Women Photographers, Noami Rosenblum, Abbeville Press, Estados Unidos; Our Mothers, Portraits by 72 Women Photographers, edited by Vivian Esders y el libro LOVE, Harpers Collins, New York.4

== Galleries and collections ==
- Bibliothèque Nationale, Paris, Francia
- Museo George Pompidiu, Paris, Francia
- Colección Marsh, Madrid, España
- Museo Nacional de Bellas Artes, Buenos Aires, Argentina
- Museo de Arte Moderno, México, México
