= Cuando =

Cuando may refer to:

- Cuando River, river of Angola, Namibia, and Botswana
- Cuando Province, Angola
- "Cuando" (song), by Ricardo Arjona, 2000
- Cuando, one of the Spanish pronouns

== See also ==
- Quando (disambiguation)
