= Nombre de Dios, Colón =

Corregimiento and city in Colón, Panama

Nombre de Dios
- Corregimiento and city
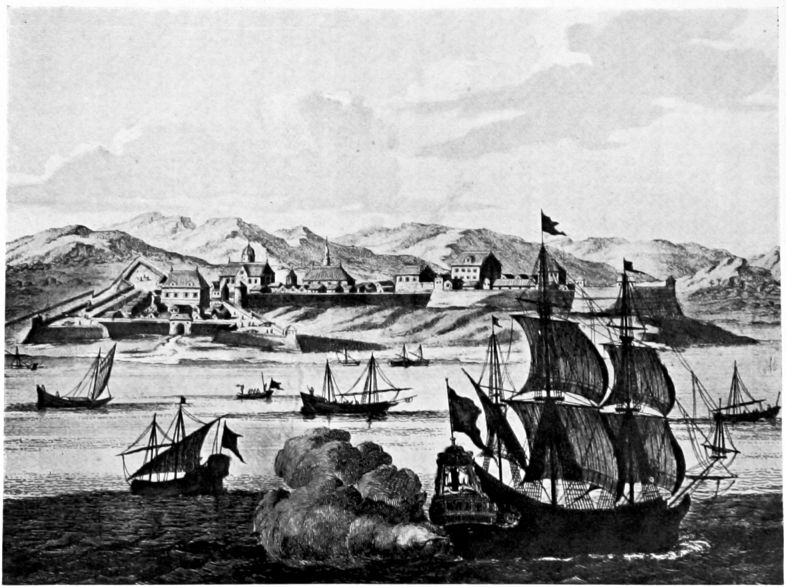
- Illustration of an imagined Nombre de Dios, from Peter Schenk's 1672 Hecatompolis

- Location within Panama
- Coordinates: 9°34′58.40″N 79°28′13.10″W
- Country: Panama
- Province: Colón
- District: Santa Isabel

Area
  - Land: 143.5 km^{2} (55.4 sq mi)

Population (2010)
  - Total: 1,130
  - Density: 7.9/km^{2} (20/sq mi)
- Population density calculated based on land area.
- Time zone: UTC−5 (EST)

Nombre de Dios (Spanish: "Name of God") is a city and corregimiento in Santa Isabel District, Colón Province, Panama, on the Atlantic coast of Panama in the Colón Province. Founded as a Spanish colony in 1510 by Diego de Nicuesa, it was one of the first European settlements on the Isthmus of Panama.

A major port of call for Spanish silver shipments during the 16th century, it was difficult to defend and was virtually abandoned by the Spanish after 1600. As of 2010, it had a population of 1,130 people.

== History ==
Nombre de Dios is the oldest continuously inhabited European settlement in the continental Americas. Developed as a major port of call for the Spanish treasure fleet, Nombre de Dios was the most significant port for shipping in the Americas between 1540 and 1580. It was dominated by Spanish colonial traffic.

After the opening of colonial silver mines in Potosí in 1546, in present-day Bolivia, silver was shipped north to Panama City along the Pacific coast. It was carried by mule trains across the isthmus to Nombre de Dios for shipment via the Atlantic to Havana and Spain. Nombre de Dios was situated near an unhealthy swamp and was nearly impossible to fortify, so it declined in importance.

In June 1572 the English privateer Francis Drake sacked the colony and in April of the following year, he ambushed the Spanish Silver Train, a mule convoy carrying a fortune in precious metals. Drake captured the town again in 1595 but found little treasure; he missed 5 million pesos waiting off the Pacific side. After that date, the Spanish preferred to use Portobelo as their Caribbean port.

By 1580, Veracruz in present-day Mexico became a more important port. Mexican silver production increased steadily while South American production declined sharply after 1700. By 1600, Nombre de Dios had been all but abandoned by the Spanish. The town still exists, though it is much less populous than in the 16th century.

Its population as of 1990 was 1,028 and of 2000 was 1,053.

== Culture ==
Nombre de Dios is mentioned by the poet Derek Walcott in The Prodigal:

Caravels slid over the horizon.

The flags of the sea-almonds wilted
and yard-smoke drifted, forked as Drake's beard,

sacker of Nombre de Dios.

— The Prodigal (p. 46)

The bay is also mentioned in Sir Henry Newbolt's poem "Drake's Drum", about a legend of Sir Francis Drake:

Drake he's in his hammock an' a thousand miles away,
(Capten, art tha sleepin' there below?)
Slung atween the round shot in Nombre Dios Bay,
An' dreamin' arl the time o' Plymouth Hoe.
Yarnder lumes the Island, yarnder lie the ships,
Wi' sailor lads a-dancing' heel-an'-toe,
An' the shore-lights flashin', an' the night-tide dashin',
He sees et arl so plainly as he saw et long ago.

== See also ==
- Piracy in the Caribbean
