= Colón District, Panama =

Colón District
- District
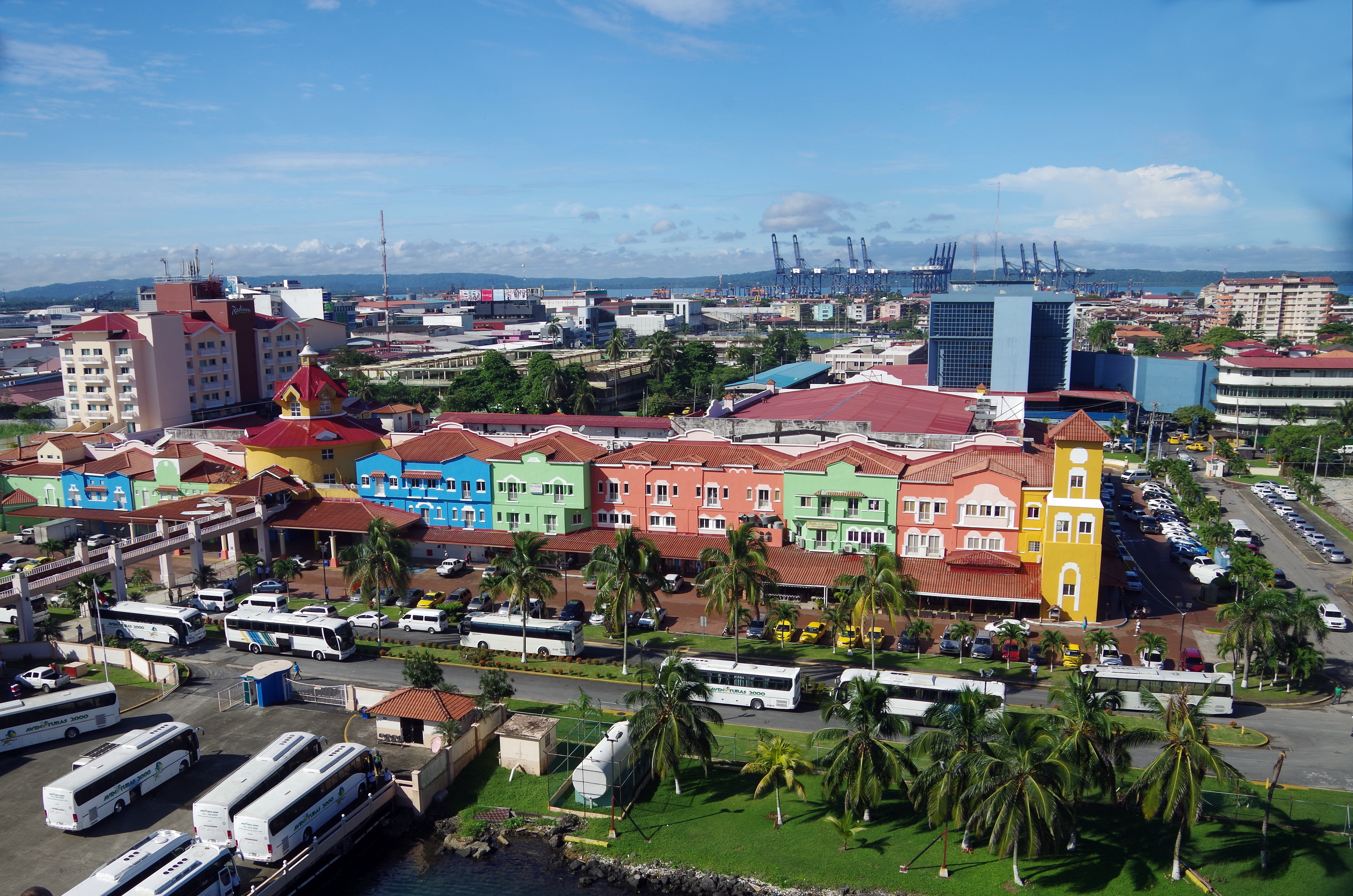

- Location of the district capital in Panama
- Coordinates: 9°20′N 79°54′W
- Country: Panama
- Province: Colón Province
- Capital: Colón City

Area
  - Total: 460 sq mi (1,180 km^{2})

Population (2019)
  - Total: 253,366
  - Density: 556/sq mi (215/km^{2})
- official estimate
- Time zone: UTC-5 (ETZ)

Colón District is a district (distrito) of Colón Province in Panama. The population according to the 2000 census was 174,059; the latest official estimate (for 2019) is 253,366. The district covers a total area of 1,180 km^{2} (460 sq mi). The capital lies at the city of Colón City.

== Administrative divisions ==
Colón District is divided administratively into the following corregimientos:

- Barrio Norte^{1}
- Barrio Sur^{1}
- Buena Vista
- Cativá
- Ciricito
- Sabanitas
- Salamanca
- Limón
- Nueva Providencia
- Puerto Pilón
- Cristóbal
- Cristóbal Este
- Escobal
- San Juan
- Santa Rosa

^{1} - These corregimientos represent as Colón City, the capital of the district.
