= Barrio Norte, Panama =

Barrio Norte
- Corregimiento
- Location within Panama
- Country: Panama
- Province: Colón
- District: Colón

Area
  - Land: 1.2 km^{2} (0.46 sq mi)

Population (2010)
  - Total: 20,579
  - Density: 17,413.3/km^{2} (45,100/sq mi)
- Population density calculated based on land area.
- Time zone: UTC−5 (EST)

Barrio Norte is a corregimiento in Colón District, Colón Province, Panama with a population of 20,579 as of 2010. Its population as of 1990 was 30,385; its population as of 2000 was 24,346.
