= Cuango, Panama =

Coordinates: 9.5667°N 79.3167°W

Cuango
- Corregimiento
- Location within Panama
- Country: Panama
- Province: Colón
- District: Santa Isabel

Area
  - Land: 37.9 km^{2} (14.6 sq mi)

Population (2010)
  - Total: 442
  - Density: 11.7/km^{2} (30/sq mi)
- Population density calculated based on land area.
- Time zone: UTC−5 (EST)

Cuango is a corregimiento in Santa Isabel District, Colón Province, Panama with a population of 442 as of 2010. Its population as of 1990 was 159; its population as of 2000 was 331.
