= Punta Mala, Panama =

Punta Mala
- Location within Panama
- Interactive map of Punta Mala

Geography
- Location: Pedasí District, Los Santos Province, Panama
- Coordinates: 7°28′00″N 80°00′32″W

Administration
- Panama

Punta Mala is a cape located in the center of Panama, specifically to the southeast of the Azuero Peninsula, in the Pedasí District.

Due to its strategic position, the United States Army built a four-story facility in the 1940s for the purpose of defending the Panama Canal. This facility was later transferred to Panama and was abandoned for decades.

Later in October 1999, then-President Mireya Moscoso made repairs, apparently with her own money, and turned it into her presidential home. When the scandal arose in 2003, Moscoso declared that the property belonged to his grandfather and was expropriated in 1938 in favor of the Americans, and to end the controversy she decided to tender the house to her brother, although in 2011 the land was concessioned to a foundation whose board of directors is headed by Moscoso herself.
