= Colón Province =

Province of Panama

Colón Province Provincia de Colón
- Province
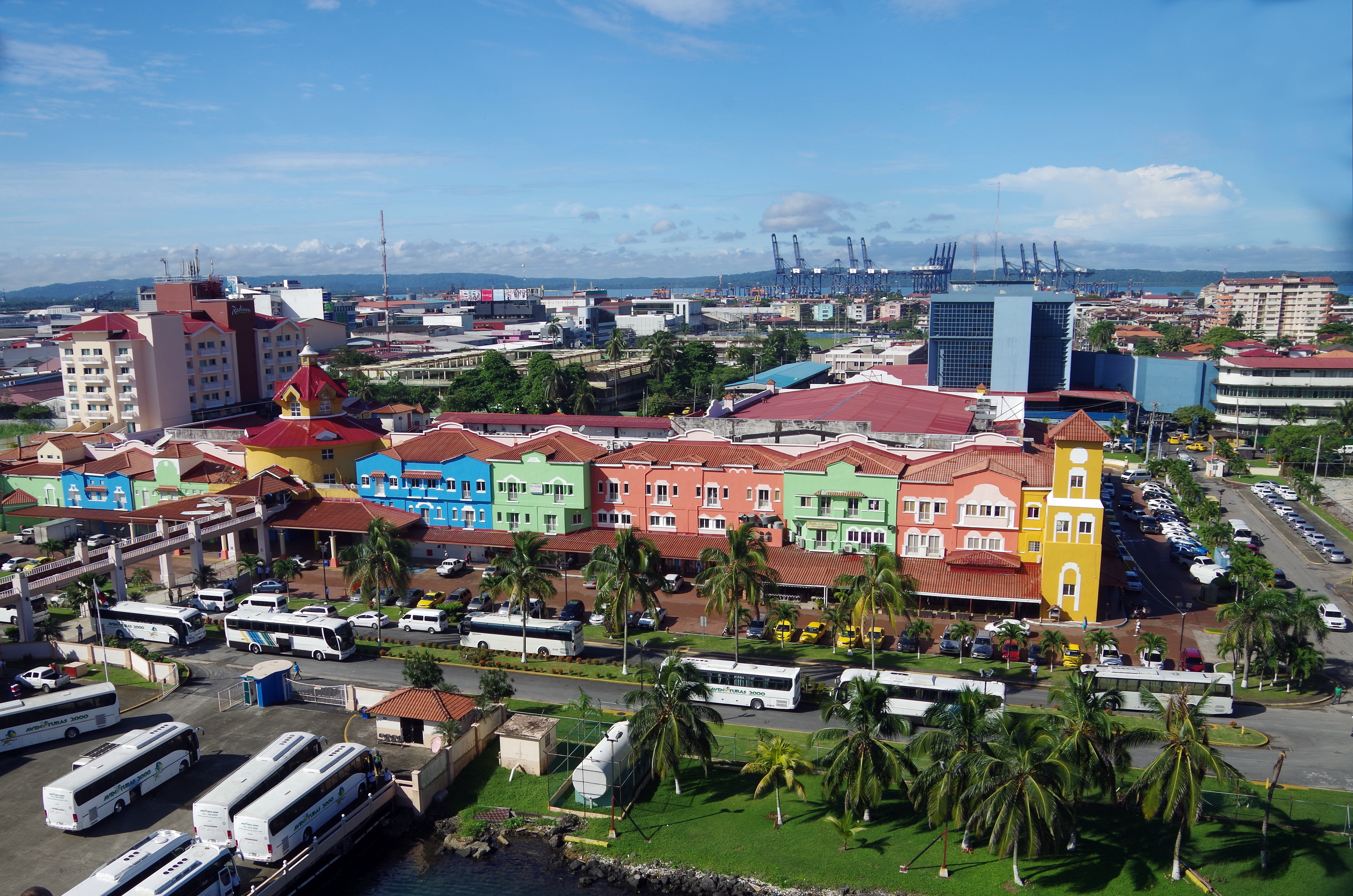

- Flag Coat of arms

- Location of Colón Province in Panama
- Coordinates: 9°10′N 80°10′W
- Country: Panama
- Founded: 1855
- Capital city: Colón

Area
  - Total: 4,575.5 km^{2} (1,766.6 sq mi)

Population (2023 census)
  - Total: 281,956
  - Rank: 4th
  - Density: 61.623/km^{2} (159.60/sq mi)
- official estimate

GDP (PPP, constant 2015 values)
  - Year: 2023
  - Total: $7.6 billion
  - Per capita: $27,100
- Time zone: UTC-5 (Eastern Time)
- ISO 3166 code: PA-3
- HDI (2017): 0.799 high

Colón (Spanish pronunciation: [koˈlon]) is a province of Panama. The capital is the city of Colón. It covers an area of 4,575.5 km^{2}, and the population (in 2023) is 281,956.

== Overview ==
This province has traditionally been focused on commerce (through the Colón Free Zone, Panama Canal, and its banking activities), but also has natural resources that are being developed as a tourist attraction, such as coral reefs and rainforests. During the Spanish colonial period, the Colon region of Panama was the center of trade, commerce, and overall economy for the Spanish. They imported many black African slaves to this area to work in Panama and to ship to other Spaniard colonies.

Most of the black population in Panama is centered in the Province of Colon. Panama has two distinct groups of black people. The first and earliest black people were those who came as slaves as early as the fifteenth century, through much of the nineteenth century. They are of mixed African and Spanish descent. This group is known as Cimarrones, Afro Colonials, Nativos, Playeros, Congos. These terms have proven crucial in establishing that these are the first and original black people of the Republic of Panama. Afro Colonials have held on to their culture and adopted Hispanic customs, traits, and cultures. They took and assumed Spanish names and surnames. They also developed the beginning of Panama's black population and culture, in pure and mixed forms. They have been incorporated into Panamanian and Spanish-speaking society, as a result.

In the nineteenth century, beginning as early as the 1840s, black people from the Caribbean and West Indies immigrated to Panama to assist to build the Panama Railway and the Panama Canal. Later many black people from all over the Caribbean and West Indies, especially from Jamaica and Barbados, settled here between the years of 1880 and 1901 to build the Panama Canal. Many later settled in the Colon Province. This group of Caribbean and/or West Indian origin are called Afro Antillanos by the Hispanic Panamanians. They have assimilated to the Hispanic culture and Panama as well as holding on to aspects of their descent and culture. They have influenced the cuisine and music of Panama. Most importantly, their influence on music, especially from those of Jamaican descent who created Reggae en Español.

== Administrative divisions ==
Since the creation of Omar Torrijos Herrera District in 2018, Colón Province is divided into six districts (distritos) which are subdivided into 42 corregimientos.

District	Area (km^{2})	Population (2010 estimate)	Population (2023 census)	Notes
Chagres	445	10,282	10,968	Located to the west of the Panama Canal.
Colón	1,180	218,604	240,722	Contains the City of Colón.
Donoso	1,627	13,165	12,274	Westernmost district of the province.
Omar Torrijos Herrera	199	–	3,561	Formerly a part of Donoso District.
Portobelo	397	9,382	10,320	Located to the east of the Panama Canal.
Santa Isabel	727	3,530	4,111	Easternmost district of the province.

=== List of corregimientos ===
District	Corregimientos (Townships)	Cabecera (Seat)
Chagres District	Nuevo Chagres, Achiote, El Guabo, La Encantada, Palmas Bellas, Piña, Salud	Nuevo Chagres
Colón District	Barrio Norte^{1}, Barrio Sur^{1}, Buena Vista, Cativá, Ciricito, Sabanitas, Salamanca, Limón, Nueva Providencia, Puerto Pilón, Cristóbal, Escobal, San Juan, Santa Rosa	Colón City
Donoso District	Miguel de la Borda, Coclé del Norte, El Guásimo, Gobea, Río Indio	Miguel de la Borda
Omar Torrijos Herrera District	San José del General, Nueva Esperanza, San Juan de Turbe	San José del General
Portobelo District	San Felipe de Portobelo, Cacique, Garrote, Isla Grande, María Chiquita	San Felipe de Portobelo
Santa Isabel District	Palenque, Cuango, Miramar, Nombre de Dios, Palmira, Playa Chiquita, Santa Isabel, Viento Frío	Palenque

Notes:

^{1} These corregimientos make up the City of Colón.

== Limon Bay ==
Bahía Limón (Limón Bay; 9°20′N 79°56′W) is a natural harbor in the province located at the north end of the Panama Canal, west of the cities of Cristóbal and Colón. Ships waiting to enter the canal stay here, protected from storms by breakwaters.
