= Donoso District =

- District

- Location of the district capital in Panama
- Coordinates: 9°9′N 80°19′W
- Country: Panama
- Province: Colón Province
- Capital: Miguel de la Borda

Area
  - Total: 705 sq mi (1,826 km^{2})

Population (2019)
  - Total: 14,798
  - Density: 20.99/sq mi (8.104/km^{2})
- official estimate
- Time zone: UTC-5 (ETZ)

Donoso District is a district (distrito) of Colón Province in Panama. The population according to the 2000 census was 9,671; the latest official estimate (for 2019) is 14,798. The district lies along the Caribbean coast in the west of the province and covers a total area of 1,826 km^{2} (705 sq mi). The capital is the town of Miguel de la Borda.

== Administrative divisions ==
Donoso District is divided administratively into the following corregimientos:

- Miguel de la Borda (capital)
- Coclé del Norte
- El Guásimo
- Gobea
- Río Indio
