= Señorita Panamá 2024 =

58th Miss Panamá pageant

- Date: August 3, 2024
- Presenters: Lily Vargas; Massiel Rodríguez
- Entertainment: Arian Abadi; Tanikko; Fernando Corona; Sandra Sandoval; Olga Tañón
- Venue: Figali Convention Center, Panama City, Panama
- Broadcaster: SERTV; ¡Hola! TV; Telemetro
- Entrants: 24
- Placements: 12
- Winner: Italy Mora (dethroned) - Mirna Caballini (Assumed); Riviera del Canal - Chiriquí
- Congeniality: Claudia Martínez, Darién

Señorita Panamá 2024 was the 58th edition of the Señorita Panamá pageant, held at the Figali Convention Center in Panama City, Panama, on August 3, 2024. This was the first selection of the renewed Señorita Panama pageant, under the direction of Cesar Anel Rodríguez, who took charge of the national event after acquired the franchise in 2024.

Miss Panamá 2023 Natasha Vargas of Los Santos crowned Italy Mora of Riviera del Canal as her successor at the end of the event.

Italy Mora was unable to represent Panama at Miss Universe 2024 because she was disqualified by the Miss Universe Organization.

On April 22, 2025, the Señorita Panamá Organization announced Mirna Caballini Bouche from Chiriquí as the new Miss Universe Panama 2024 and will represent the country in the Miss Universe 2025, scheduled to be held at the Impact Challenger in Pak Kret, Thailand, on 21 November 2025.

== Results ==
=== Placements ===
Placement	Contestant
Miss Universe Panama 2024	Riviera del Canal – Italy Mora (dethroned)
1st Runner-Up	Panamá Centro – Liliam Ashby Barrera
2nd runner-Up	Chiriquí – Mirna Alejandra Caballini Bouche (Assumed)
3rd Runner-Up	Veraguas – Brigthey Estrella Castillo
4th Runner-Up	Isla Grande – Shahani Guardia
Top 12	Chiriquí Occidente – Daniela Jiménez; Contadora – Paulette Rosales; Los Santos – Marie Schwarz González; Panamá Este – Mireily Victoria; Panamá Oeste – Maryory Alvarado Santos; Riviera Pacífica – Nairoby Núñez; Santa Isabel – Mélida Asprilla

=== Special awards ===
Award	Contestant
Miss Congeniality	Daríen – Claudia Martínez
Best National Costume	Los Santos – Marie Schwarz

== Judges ==
- Valeria Murillo: director of communications of Miss Universe Panamá organization.
- Héctor Duarte: Latinoamerican brand consultant.
- Monica "Lola" Díaz: TV host.
- Francisco Franco: Journalist and social communicator.
- Anahil Trompiz Torres: director of Ellas Magazine.
- Keno Manzur: Miss Argentina & Miss Universo Chile director.
- Chiara Ortiz Apuy: creative director of Not Basic Studio.
- Jesús Flores: Puerto Rican publicist (only as a final judge).
- Anabella Nahem: director of Selecta & A Otro Nivel Magazine (only as a final judge).
- Alberto Cuervo: publicist and businessman fashion designer (only as a final judge).
- Sugeilin Cabrera: fashion designer (only as a final judge).
- Martín Pereyra Rozas: CEO of Pandora for Latin American and Asia (only as a final judge).
- Paul Loo: personal trainer (only as a final judge).
- Cibeles De Freitas: CEO of PR5 (only as a final judge).
- Jhon Wilson: Doctor & surgeon (only as a final judge).
- Cristian Carabias: Actor and TV presenter (only as a final judge).
- Gloria Karamañites: Miss Panamá 1980 (only as a final judge).
- Sorangel Matos: Miss Panamá 2007 (only as a final judge).
- José L. Castro: Missólogo (only as a final judge).
- Ludwik Tapia: TV host (only as a final judge).
- Carmen Jaramillo: Miss Panamá 2020 (only as a final judge).
- Fernando Corona: Mexican Singer (only as a final judge).
- Juan Diego Vásquez: lawyer and politician (only as a final judge).

== Preliminary competition ==
=== Presentation Show ===
The presentation Show took place on July 3, 2024, a ceremony that took place at the Biomuseo of Panamá, in Panama City, where the twenty four candidates who were officially presented to the public and the press were officially presented. They will compete for the title of Señorita Panama 2024 and the opportunity to represent Panama in the international beauty pageant, Miss Universe 2024.

=== Preliminary interview ===
Held on July 28, the Señorita Panama candidates were qualified in a personal interview for the judges.

=== Preliminary Selection ===
Celebrated on August 2, the candidates were qualified in swimsuit and evening gown.

== National Costume Competition ==
On August 2, was celebrated the National Costume contestant called Gala Viva Panamá. In this competition the contestants are not evaluated, only the costumes. It is a competition showing the country's wealth embodied in the colorful and fascinating costumes made by Panamanian designers combining the past and present of Panama. The winner costume represent Panamá in Miss Universe 2024.

Final results	Contest	Designer	Topic	Contestant
Winner	Best National Costume to Miss Universe	Róyer Pérez	"Soberanía Heroína del Istmo"	Marie Schwarz

- Archipiélagos - "Panamá: Abundancia de peces y mariposas"
- Bocas del Toro - "La Quema del torito guapo"
- Chiriquí - "El Gran Colibrí"
- Chiriquí Occidente - "Oceanos: riqueza y vida de un sueño istmeño"
- Coclé - "Danza del Diablo sucio"
- Colón - "Panamá: el tesoro verde"
- Contadora - "La Princesa Zaratí"
- Darién - "Reina Congo de Colón"
- Isla Colón - "La Isla Colón"
- Flamenco - "La Perla Peregrina"
- Isla Grande - "Reina hada de la Flora Panameña"
- Las Tablas - "El vuelo de la Mariposa"
- Los Santos - "Soberanía Heroína del Istmo"
- Panamá Centro - "El Tembleque"
- Panamá Este - "La Diablita y la cuarteada del Sol de la Plaza de Parita"
- Panamá Norte - "Diablos Sucios del Corpus Christi "
- Panamá Oeste - "Gran Diablo de la Chorrera"
- Panamá Viejo - "Diablo Chorrerano"
- Penonomé - "La Rana Dorada"
- Riviera del Canal - "La Guacamaya bandera"
- Riviera Pacífica - "Dios del Sol de la comarca Ngöbe Buglé"
- Santa Isabel - "Paraiso del Caribe: Santa Isabel "
- Veraguas - "Panamá de oro, Panamá verde"

== Contestants ==
These are the competitors who have been selected this year.

City/Province	Contestant	Age	Hometown
Archipiélagos	Sofía Rivera		Ciudad de Panamá
Bocas del Toro	Christine Williams	23	Bocas del Toro
Chiriquí	Mirna Alejandra Caballini Bouche	21	David
Chiriquí Occidente	Daniela Jiménez	29	Puerto Armuelles
Coclé	Amarilis Acevedo	22	Penonome
Colón	Mariany Galván	23	Colón
Contadora	Paulette Rosales	25	Ciudad de Panamá
Darién	Claudia Martínez	29	Darién
Isla Colón	Anduaneth Bernal Smith	20	Colón
Flamenco	Nazeli Cervera	25	Ciudad de Panamá
Isla Grande	Shahani Guardia	19	Colón
Las Tablas	Tatiana Saavedra	35	Las Tablas
Los Santos	Marie Schwarz González		Las Tablas
Panamá Centro	Liliam Ashby Barrera	24	Ciudad de Panamá
Panamá Este	Mireily Victoria	23	Ciudad de Panamá
Panamá Norte	Kathia González	22	Ciudad de Panamá
Panamá Oeste	Maryory Alvarado Santos	35	La Chorrera
Panamá Viejo	Thilcya Martínez	23	Ciudad de Panamá
Penonomé	Mariaceleste Saturno	18	La Chorrera
Riviera del Canal	Italy Johan Peñaloza Mora	19	Ciudad de Panamá
Riviera Pacífica	Nairoby Núñez	26	Ciudad de Panamá
Santa Isabel	Mélida Asprilla	30	Colón
Taboga	Amira Cáceres	18	Ciudad de Panamá
Veraguas	Brigthey Estrella Castillo	23	Santiago de Veraguas

== Historical significance ==
- Riviera del Canal won the Señorita Panamá title for the first time.
- Chiriquí placed as 2nd Runner-Up for consecutive year.
- Chiriquí assumed the Señorita Panamá title, making the second title for the province, last time in 1999 with Analía Núñez.
- Isla Grande placed for the first time and earned the 4th Runner-Up.
- Chiriquí, Panamá Centro, Veraguas, Panamá Oeste, Los Santos placed in the top last year.
- Contadora & Chiriquí Occidente placed for the last time in (2017).
- Panamá Este placed for the last time in (2019).
- Riviera Pacifica placed for the last time in (2019) as Costa Pacifica.

== Delegate notes ==
- Some of the delegates of Miss Panama 2023 have participated in other important national and international pageants:
  - Italy Mora (Riviera del Canal) was a semifinalist in Miss Panamá 2023 representing Panamá Centro.
  - Paulette Rosales (Contadora) was Miss Tourism Panamá 2018.
