= Miss Panamá 2023 =

57th Miss Panamá pageant

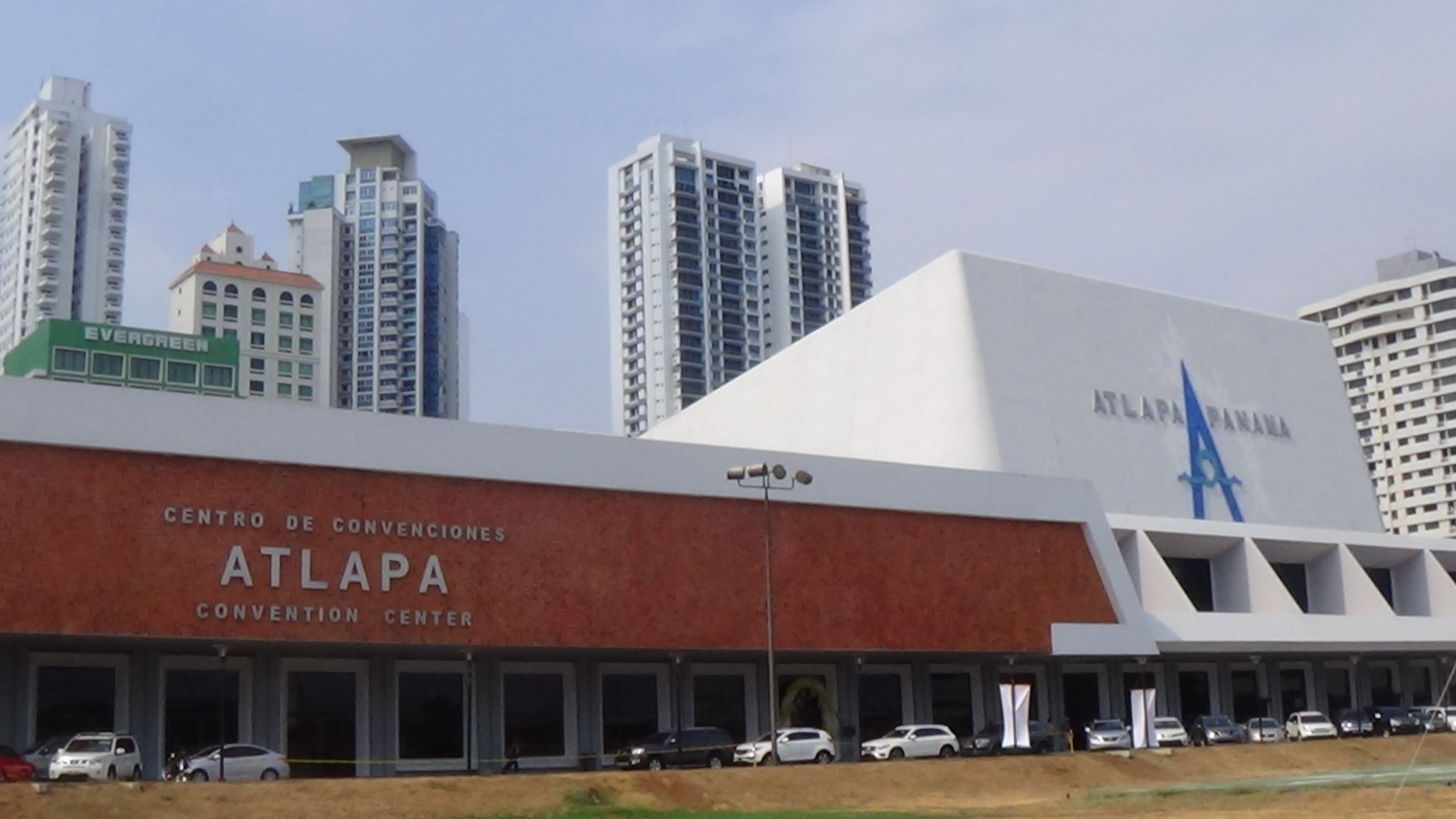
- Atlapa, venue of Miss Panamá 2023
- Date: September 13, 2023
- Presenters: Jorge Herrera; Brenda Smith
- Entertainment: Doble Sentido; Martín Machore
- Venue: Atlapa Convention Centre, Panama City, Panama
- Broadcaster: Telemetro
- Entrants: 15
- Placements: 7
- Winner: Natasha Vargas; Los Santos
- Congeniality: Rocibel Jaramillo; Taboga
- Photogenic: Italy Peñaloza; Panamá Centro

Miss Panamá 2023 was the 57th edition of the Miss Panamá pageant, held at the Atlapa Convention Centre in Panama City, Panama, on September 13, 2023. This was the second edition of the renewed Miss Panama pageant, under the direction of Miss Panama Organization, who took charge of the national event in 2022.

Solaris Barba of Herrera crowned Natasha Vargas of Los Santos as her successor at the end of the event. Vargas represented Panama at Miss Universe 2023, held in El Salvador on 18 November 2023.

== Results ==
=== Placements ===
Placement	Contestant
Miss Universe Panama 2023	Los Santos – Natasha Vargas
1st Runner-Up	Panamá Oeste – Diana Lemos
2nd Runner-Up	Chiriquí – Katherine Fuentes
Top 7	Bocas del Toro – Guadalupe Ureña; Las Perlas – Luisa López; Panamá Centro – Italy Peñaloza; Veraguas – Karliz Moreno

== Special awards ==
Award	Contestant
Miss Photogenic	Panamá Centro - Italy Peñaloza
Miss Congeniality	Taboga - Rocibel Jaramillo
Best Hair	Los Santos – Natasha Vargas
Healthy Hair	Isla del Rey - Anabelis Moreno
Miss Cielo	Los Santos – Natasha Vargas
Best Silhouette	Pedasí - Ilany González
Miss Maissi	Panamá Oeste - Diana Lemos
Best Projection	Panamá Centro - Italy Peñaloza
Best Body	Panamá Oeste - Diana Lemos

== Judges ==
- Héctor Alfonso: Professor of Pedagogy.
- Stephania De Los Santos: Lawyer and Businesswoman (only as preliminary judge).
- Nadia Jiménez: Businesswoman (only as preliminary judge).
- Adela Vásquez: Brand Manager · Changan Auto Panama.
- Shabania Carter Stew: Wife of the UK ambassador to Panama (preliminary judge only).
- Rossana Tabares: Businesswoman (only as preliminary judge).
- Mariela Vega: Personal, Comprehensive and Business Image Advisor (only as a preliminary judge).
- Zunilda Gutiérrez: fashion designer.
- Dario Moreno: photographer.
- Delia Domínguez: Businesswoman.
- María Chacón: Co-founder of Leotards Panama.
- Luis M. Caballero: Co-Founder of Panama Aesthetics.

== Preliminary competition ==
=== Presentation Show ===
The presentation Show took place on June 9, 2023, a ceremony that took place at the Las Américas Golden Tower Hotel, in Panama City, where the fifteen candidates who were officially presented to the public and the press were officially presented. They will compete for the title of Miss Panama 2023 and the opportunity to represent Panama in the international beauty pageant, Miss Universe 2023.

=== Preliminary interview ===
Held on September 9, the Miss Panama candidates were qualified in a personal interview for the judges.

== Costume selection ==
Held on September 12, was the election for the Best National Costume. In this competition, the contestants were not evaluated, only the costumes.

The event showcased the creative work of Panamanian designers and also selected the costume for Panama at Miss Universe 2023. Some costumes were also elected to represent Panama in other beauty contests.

Final results	Contest	Designer	Topic
Winner	Best National Costume to Miss Universe	Tambor de la Alegría	Daniel Cortina
Top 6		Diabladas	Daniel Cortina
Top 6		Puedo Volar	Virgilio Batista
Top 6		El salón Amarillo del Palacio de las Garzas	David Sáez
Top 6		La india Dormida, Flor del aire	Rubén Labrador
Top 6		La mola, mágico vestido ancestral	Abdiel Bonilla

== Contestants ==
These are the competitors who have been selected this year.

Represented	Contestant	Age	Hometown	Placement
Bocas del Toro	Guadalupe Mercedes Ureña Coronel	28	Bocas del Toro	Top 7
Chiriquí	Katherine Marie Fuentes Bollmeyer	27	David	2nd Runner-Up
Coclé	Kimberlyn Lorena García Castillo	25	Penonome	
Colón	Shayned Rachel La Boissiere Sánchez	21	Colón	
Darién	Valentina Sánchez Cuenca Martínez	18	Ciudad de Panamá	
Herrera	Ana Cristina Samaniego González	24	Chitré	
Isla del Rey	Anabelis Yissel Moreno Navas	26	Ciudad de Panamá	
Las Perlas	Luisa Lorena López Rodríguez	28	Ciudad de Panamá	Top 7
Los Santos	Natasha Lineth Vargas Moreno	25	Las Tablas	Miss Universe Panamá 2023
Panamá Centro	Italy Johan Peñaloza Mora	18	Ciudad de Panamá	Top 7
Panamá Este	Krystell Estefana Tolluch González	20	Ciudad de Panamá	
Panamá Oeste	Diana Patricia Lemos Lee	24	La Chorrera	1st Runner-Up
Pedasí	Ilany Yasmín González Torres	21	Los Santos	
Taboga	Rocibel Daivonex Jaramillo Vallejos	27	Ciudad de Panamá	
Veraguas	Karliz Isabelle Moreno Lagual	23	Santiago de Veraguas	Top 7

== Delegate notes ==
- Some of the delegates of Miss Panama 2023 have participated in other important national and international pageants:
  - Diana Lemos (Panama Oeste) participated in the Miss Earth 2018.
  - Guadalupe Ureña (Bocas Del Toro) was a semifinalist in Miss United Continents 2022.
