= Señorita Panamá 2019 =

53rd Señorita Panamá pageant

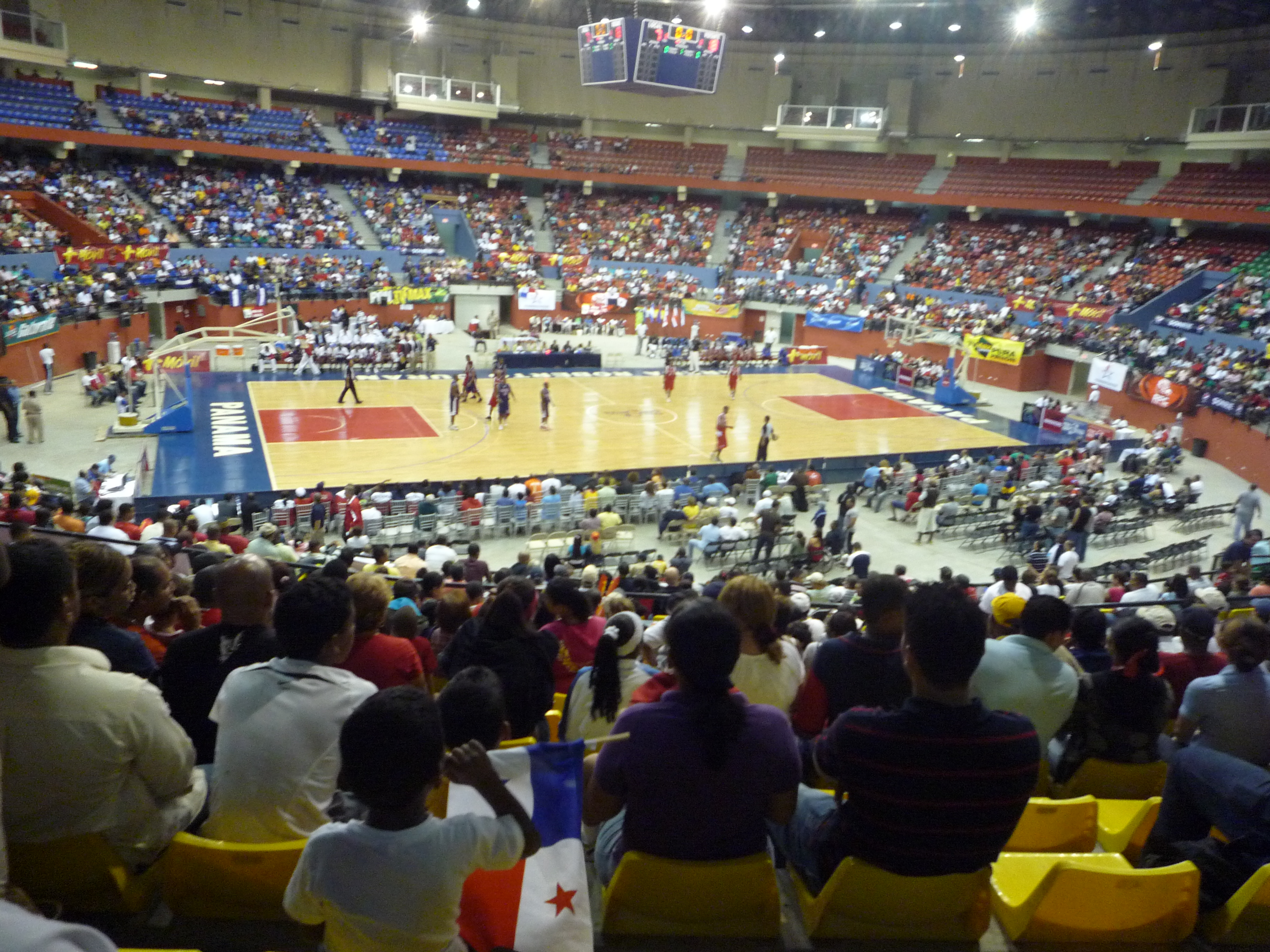
- Arena Roberto Durán, venue of Señorita Panamá 2019
- Date: June 20, 2019
- Presenters: Rolando Sterling, Michelle Simons & Marilú De Icaza
- Entertainment: Yamilka Pitre & "Renny & René"
- Venue: Roberto Durán Arena, Panama City, Panama
- Broadcaster: Telemetro
- Entrants: 24
- Placements: 12
- Winner: Mehr Eliezer; Isla Flamenco

Señorita Panamá 2019 was the 53rd Señorita Panamá pageant. It selected the national representatives to the Miss Universe, Miss International, and Miss Grand International competitions. This was the fourth edition of the renewed Señorita Panama pageant, under the direction of Cesar Anel Rodríguez, who took charge of the national event in 2016. Twenty-four preliminary contestants were selected from throughout Panama and competed for the crown.

The 2019 edition was held, for the second year in a row, at the Roberto Durán Arena in Panama City on June 20, 2018. Señorita Panamá 2018 Rosa Montezuma of Comarcas crowned Mehr Eliezer of Isla Flamenco as her successor at the end of the event.

Representatives to Miss International and Miss Grand International was also elected. Shirel Ortiz of Panamá Centro crowned Betzaida Rodriguez of Los Santos as Miss Panama International 2019 and Gabriela Mornhinweg of Panamá Centro crowned Carmen Drayton of Portobelo as Miss Panama Grand International 2019.

Eliezer competed in Miss Universe 2019, the 68th Miss Universe pageant. Rodriguez represented Panama in Miss International 2019, while Drayton represented Panama in Miss Grand International 2019. Drayton was recently crowned as the 3rd runner-up at the Miss Grand International 2019 competition.

Due to COVID-19 pandemic on 9 April 2020 the Señorita Panamá Organization announced Carmen Jaramillo as the Señorita Panamá for the 2020 and will represent her country in the Miss Universe 2020, the 69th Miss Universe pageant.

== Results ==
=== Placements ===
Placement	Contestant
Miss Panamá 2019	Isla Flamenco – Mehr Eliezer
Miss International Panamá 2019	Los Santos – Betzaida Rodriguez
Miss Grand Panamá 2019	Portobelo – Carmen Drayton
Señorita Panamá 2020	Panamá Este – Carmen Jaramillo
Reina Hispanoamericana Panamá 2021	Coclé – Ana Lucia Tejeira
Top 12	Bocas del Toro – Angie Keith; Chiriquí – Krysthelle Barreto Reichlin; Colón – Nathalie Pino; Costa Pacifica – Andrea Parra; Isla Barro Colorado – Mar De la Fuente; Isla del Rey – Linette Clement; Panamá Norte – Angie Daily

=== Special awards ===
Award	Contestant
Miss Photogenic	Bocas del Toro – Angie Keith
Miss Congeniality	Isla del Rey – Linette Clement
Best Smile	Costa Pacifica – Andrea Parra
Best Skin	Bocas del Toro – Angie Keith
Best Dress	Portobelo – Carmen Drayton
Best Hair	Chiriquí – Krysthelle Barreto Reichlin
Best Projection	Panamá Este – Carmen Jaramillo
Miss Pandora	Isla Flamenco – Mehr Eliezer
Miss Elegance	Panamá Norte – Angie Daily
Miss Internet	Portobelo – Carmen Drayton
Most Beautiful Face	Coclé – Ana Lucia Tejeira
Best Body	Isla del Rey – Linette Clement

== Special guests ==
Reigning Miss International Mariem Velazco of Venezuela served as a judge during the finals. Miss Universe 2005 Natalie Glebova also attended, and served as a judge.

== Costume selection ==
This year the contestant, was celebrated in a private casting. It is a competition showing the country's wealth embodied in the colorful and fascinating costumes made by Panamenian designers combining the past and present of Panama. The winner costume represent Panamá in Miss Universe 2019.

Final results	Contest	Designer	Topic
Winner	Best National Costume to Miss Universe	Virgilio Batista	"Puente del Mundo, Corazón del Universo"
	Best National Costume to Miss International	Arístides Carrasco	"La Danza de Diablico"
	Best National Costume to Miss Grand International	Virgilio Batista	"El vuelo de la paz, mariposa panameña"

== Preliminary competition ==
- A preliminary competition was held on 11 May 2019 at Balboa Theater. The 24 contestants were scored in the categories of swimsuit, talent and overall beauty. These scores will carry over to the finals to be held on June 20.
- Personal Interview: Two days before the finals, the 24 contestants faced the panel of judges for personal interviews.

== Judges ==
- Natalie Glebova: Miss Universe 2005. (Canada)
- Matt Rich: Public relations executive. (New York, United States)
- Jean Shafiroff: Philanthropist, writer and socialite. (New York, United States)
- Tui Pranich: International designer. (Thailand)
- Exidio Junior Zelaya: Honduran journalist. (Honduras)
- Jenia Nenzen: Journalist & Miss Panamá International 1989. (Panamá)
- George Wittels: Goldsmith International. (Austria / Venezuela)
- Javier Gómez: Fashion photographer. (Panamá - New York, United States)
- José Espino: Plastic surgeon. (Panamá)
- Sarita Esses: Social communicator. (Panamá)
- Shivam Maharaj: Sacha Cosmetics International director. (Trinidad & Tobago)
- Marcio Oliveira: Vizzano footwear sales Manager. (Brazil)
- Michele Sage: Señorita Panamá 1994. (Panamá)
- Michael Pistinos: Businessman. (New York, United States)
- Jackie Carvalho: Businesswoman. (New York, United States)
- Dean Kelly Junior: Mister Panamá 2001. (Panamá)
- Maricarmen Saavedra: Publicist and marketing manager. (Panamá)
- Myriam Barría McGorman: Public relations and tourism promoter. (Panamá - New York, United States)

== Official contestants ==
These are the competitors who have been selected this year.

Represent	Contestant	Age	Height	Hometown
Bocas del Toro	Angie Keith	25	1.76 m (5 ft 9 1/4 in)	Ciudad de Panamá
Chiriquí	Krysthelle Barreto Reichlin	23	1.75 m (5 ft 9 in)	David
Chiriquí Occidente	Victoria Rodríguez	20	1.72 m (5 ft 7 3/4 in)	Ciudad de Panamá
Coclé	Ana Lucia Tejeira	25	1.70 m (5 ft 7 in)	Penonome
Coiba	Paola Medina	25	1.72 m (5 ft 7 3/4 in)	Ciudad de Panamá
Colón	Nathalie Pino	19	1.72 m (5 ft 7 3/4 in)	Colón
Comarcas	Lauris Fernández	24	1.73 m (5 ft 8 in)	Ciudad de Panamá
Contadora	Jackeline García	20	1.70 m (5 ft 7 in)	Ciudad de Panamá
Costa Atlantica	Stephany Perea	25	1.72 m (5 ft 7 3/4 in)	Colón
Costa Pacifica	Andrea Parra	25	1.66 m (5 ft 5 1/4 in)	Ciudad de Panamá
Darién	Leydis González	21	1.80 m (5 ft 10 3/4 in)	Ciudad de Panamá
Herrera	María Cristina Saavedra	25	1.80 m (5 ft 10 3/4 in)	Chitré
Isla Barro Colorado	Mar De la Fuente	21	1.70 m (5 ft 7 in)	Ciudad de Panamá
Isla del Rey	Linette Clement	21	1.72 m (5 ft 7 3/4 in)	Ciudad de Panamá
Isla Flamenco	Mehr Eliezer	22	1.72 m (5 ft 7 3/4 in)	Ciudad de Panamá
Isla San José	Brithani Osbourne	23	1.75 m (5 ft 9 in)	Ciudad de Panamá
Los Santos	Betzaida Rodriguez	22	1.77 m (5 ft 9 3/4 in)	Las Tablas
Panamá Centro	Aura Ávila	21	1.69 m (5 ft 6 1/2 in)	Ciudad de Panamá
Panamá Este	Carmen Jaramillo	24	1.78 m (5 ft 10 in)	La Chorrera
Panamá Norte	Angie Daily	21	1.80 m (5 ft 10 3/4 in)	Ciudad de Panamá
Panamá Oeste	Yasmery Salceda	20	1.72 m (5 ft 7 3/4 in)	La Chorrera
Portobelo	Carmen Drayton	23	1.76 m (5 ft 9 1/4 in)	Colón
Taboga	Sheribel Paschall	18	1.82 m (5 ft 11 3/4 in)	Ciudad de Panamá
Veraguas	Maria Alejandra Polanco	25	1.72 m (5 ft 7 3/4 in)	Santiago de Veraguas

== Notes ==
- Miss Bocas del Toro, Angie Keith, competed in "Miss Supranational 2015" held in Poland, where she placed in the Top 10 finalists and won the title of "Miss Supranational Americas".
- Miss Darien, Leydis Gonzalez, competed in Miss Panamá 2015 and "Miss Supranational 2016" held in Poland, where she placed in the Top 25 semi-finalists.
- Miss Panama Este, Carmen Jaramillo, competed in Miss Panamá 2014 as Miss Panama Oeste and "Miss Earth 2015" held in Austria. She was unplaced. Jaramillo was also a contestant in "Reina Hispanoamericana" held in Bolivia that same year. She placed in the Top 7 finalists.
- Miss Chiriquí, Krysthelle Barreto Reichlin, competed in Miss World Panamá 2019 as Miss Panama Centro and represented the country in Miss Supranational 2019, she placed in top 10.
