= Miss World Panamá 2019 =

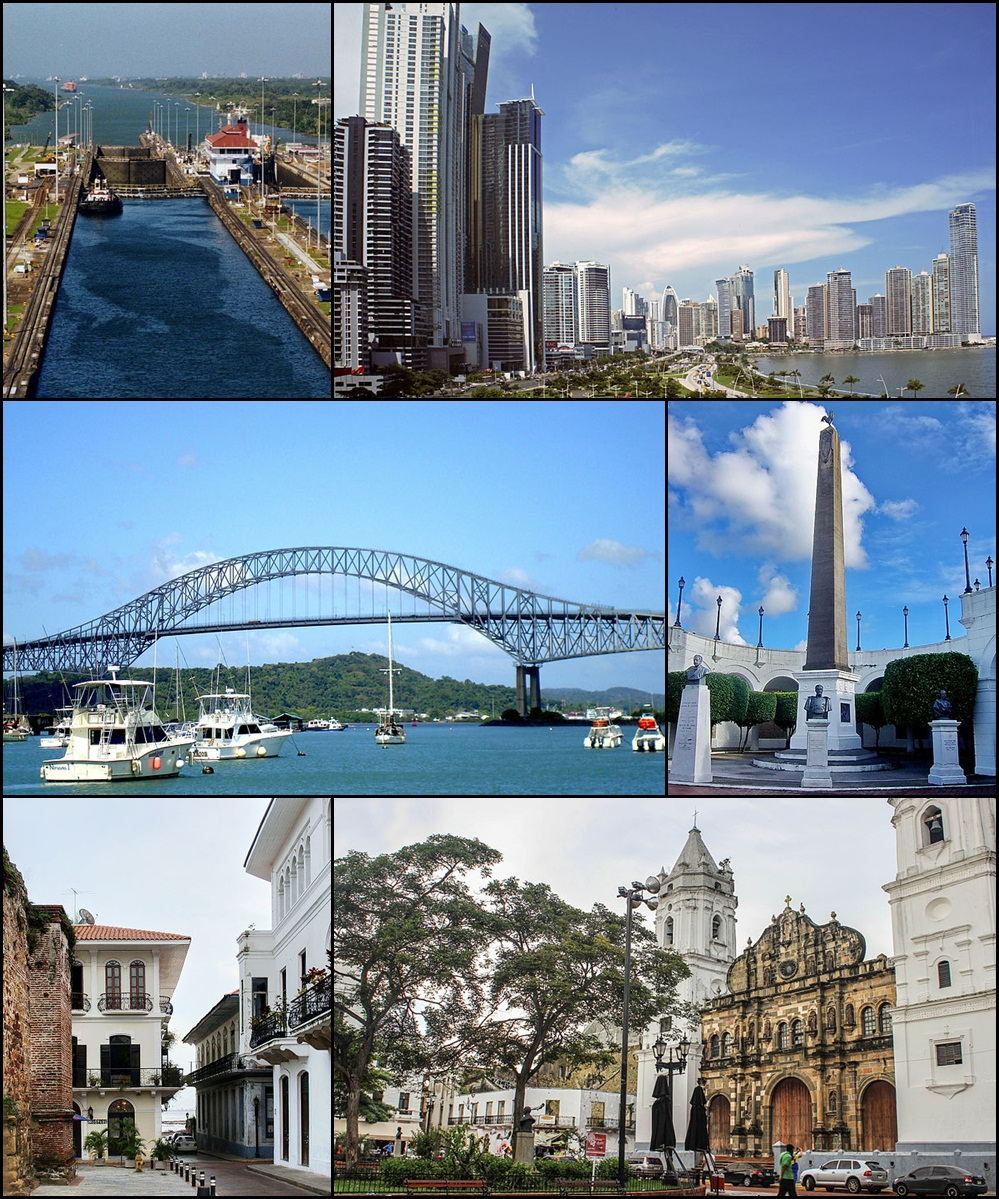
- Date: September 19, 2019
- Presenters: Carolina Brid
- Entertainment: Imer el Mago & Edward Jose
- Venue: The Golden Tower Las Americas Hotel, Ciudad de Panamá, Panama
- Broadcaster: Instagram
- Entrants: 14
- Placements: 6
- Withdrawals: Coclé, Colón, Cristóbal
- Winner: Agustina Ruíz; Herrera

Miss World Panamá 2019 was the 7th Miss World Panamá pageant, held to select Panama's representative to the Miss World pageant. This was the first edition of the renewed Miss World Panama Pageant, after the Miss World organization awarded the license to event producer Edwin Dominguez who had been named the new director of the pageant in 2016.

Seventeen preliminary contestants were selected from all over Panama and competed for the crown. Señorita Panamá World 2018 Solaris De la Luna Barba Cañizales of Herrera crowned Agustina Ruíz of Herrera as her successor at the end of the event.

Agustina Ruíz Miss World Panamá 2019 was to compete in Miss World 2019 on December 14, 2019, at the ExCeL London in London, United Kingdom.

Also Krysthelle Barreto Reichlin of Panamá Centro was designated as Miss World Panamá 2020 and represented Panamá in Miss World 2021, the 70th edition of the Miss World pageant, held at the Coca-Cola Music Hall in San Juan, Puerto Rico, on 16 March 2022.

== History ==
Señorita Panamá was created by RPC Channel 4 as an alternative to send its winners to the Miss World contest in London. In 2003 Corporación MEDCOM could not produce a pageant in time to select a representative for Miss World and Promociones Gloria in Bolivia helped select a contestant by casting; in 2007 the agency Panama Talents organized a small contest called Miss World Panamá for 2007, in 2010 Olais Padilla organized a local competition called Miss Mundo Panamá 2010, from 2011 to 2015 the Miss World license was awarded to Marisela Moreno (Miss Panama Organization) with two independent edition (2013 and 2014). In 2016 Miss World awarded the license to event producer Edwin Dominguez, who had an agreement with Señorita Panamá for three years (2016-2018) with two independent edition (2016 and 2017).

=== Final results ===
Final Results	Contestant
Miss World Panamá 2019	Herrera - Agustina Ruíz
1st runner-up / Miss World Panamá 2020	Panamá Centro - Krysthelle Barreto Reichlin
2nd runner-up	Panamá Oeste - Luisa López
Top 6 Semi-Finalist	Chiriquí - Celly Amaris; Panamá Norte - Alondra Contreras; Panamá Pacifico - Katherina Rios

=== Presentation Show ===
This Presentation event was held on 21 August 2019 at the Golden Tower Las Americas Hotel, is the night when the sixteen finalists were selected from Miss World Panamá 2019 are presented to the public and press in the Evening gown and cocktail dress categories.

== Challenge events ==
=== Top Model ===
Final Result	Contestant
Winner	Panamá Centro - Krysthelle Barreto
Top 3	Darién - Jocabed Suira; Panamá Norte - Alondra Contreras

=== Sports & Fitness ===
Final Result	Contestant
Winner	Chiriquí – Celly Amaris
1st runner-up	Panamá Oeste - Luisa López
2nd runner-up	Los Santos - Estefany Hernández

=== Talent ===
Final Result	Contestant
Winner	Herrera - Agustina Ruiz
1st runner-up	Chiriquí – Celly Amaris
2nd runner-up	Los Santos - Estefany Hernández

=== Beauty with a Purpose ===
Final Result	Contestant
Winner	Herrera - Agustina Ruiz

=== Multimedia ===
Final Result	Contestant
Winner	Panamá Centro - Krysthelle Barreto

=== Most Photogenic ===
Final Result	Contestant
Winner	Panamá Oeste - Luisa López

== Judges ==
- Killy Díaz: Businesswoman.
- Isabel Arango: General Manager of Melissa Shoes.
- Maria Fernanda Robaina: National director of Unique Fashion Spot.
- Pachi Tello Vallarino;: Designer.
- Patricia Bremner: Señorita Panamá World 1997.
- Nadege Herrera: Señorita Panamá World 2009.
- Ana Lorena Sánchez: Businesswoman.

== Official Contestants ==
These are the competitors who have been selected this year.

Represent	Contestant	Age	Height	Hometown
Balboa	Yasuani Ward	19	TBA	Ciudad de Panamá
Bocas del Toro	Dorita Ovalle	19	TBA	Ciudad de Panamá
Chiriquí	Celly Amaris	TBA	TBA	David
Darién	Jocabed Suira	23	TBA	Ciudad de Panamá
Herrera	Agustina Ruíz	25	TBA	Chitré
Los Santos	Estefany Hernández	22	TBA	Ciudad de Panamá
Panamá Centro	Krysthelle Barreto Reichlin	24	1.75 m (5 ft 9 in)	Ciudad de Panamá
Panamá Este	Isabella Bethancourth	19	TBA	Ciudad de Panamá
Panamá Norte	Alondra Contreras	18	TBA	Ciudad de Panamá
Panamá Oeste	Luisa López	23	TBA	La Chorrera
Panamá Pacifico	Katherina Rios	22	TBA	Ciudad de Panamá
Portobelo	Bélgica Pelicot	21	TBA	Colón
Taboga	Beatriz Victoria Stein Peña	24	1.78 m (5 ft 10 in)	Ciudad de Panamá
Veraguas	Victoria López	26	TBA	Santiago de Veraguas

== Candidate notes ==
- Miss World Taboga, Beatriz Victoria Stein, competed in Miss Panamá 2014 as Miss Panama Centro.
- Miss World Colón, Nathalie Pino, competed in Señorita Panamá 2019 as Miss Colón where she placed in the Top 12 semi-finalists. She withdrew from the competition after the Top Model competition.
- Miss World Panamá Centro, Krysthelle Barreto, competed in Señorita Panamá 2019 as Miss Chiriquí where she placed in the Top 12 semi-finalists.
- Miss World Panamá Pacifico, Katherina Rios, competed in Señorita Panamá 2018 as Miss Isla del Rey.
- Miss World Coclé, Grace Sarmiento, withdrew from the competition for personal reasons.
- Miss World Cristóbal, Litzy Del Cid , withdrew from the competition for personal reasons.
