= Miss Panamá 2022 =

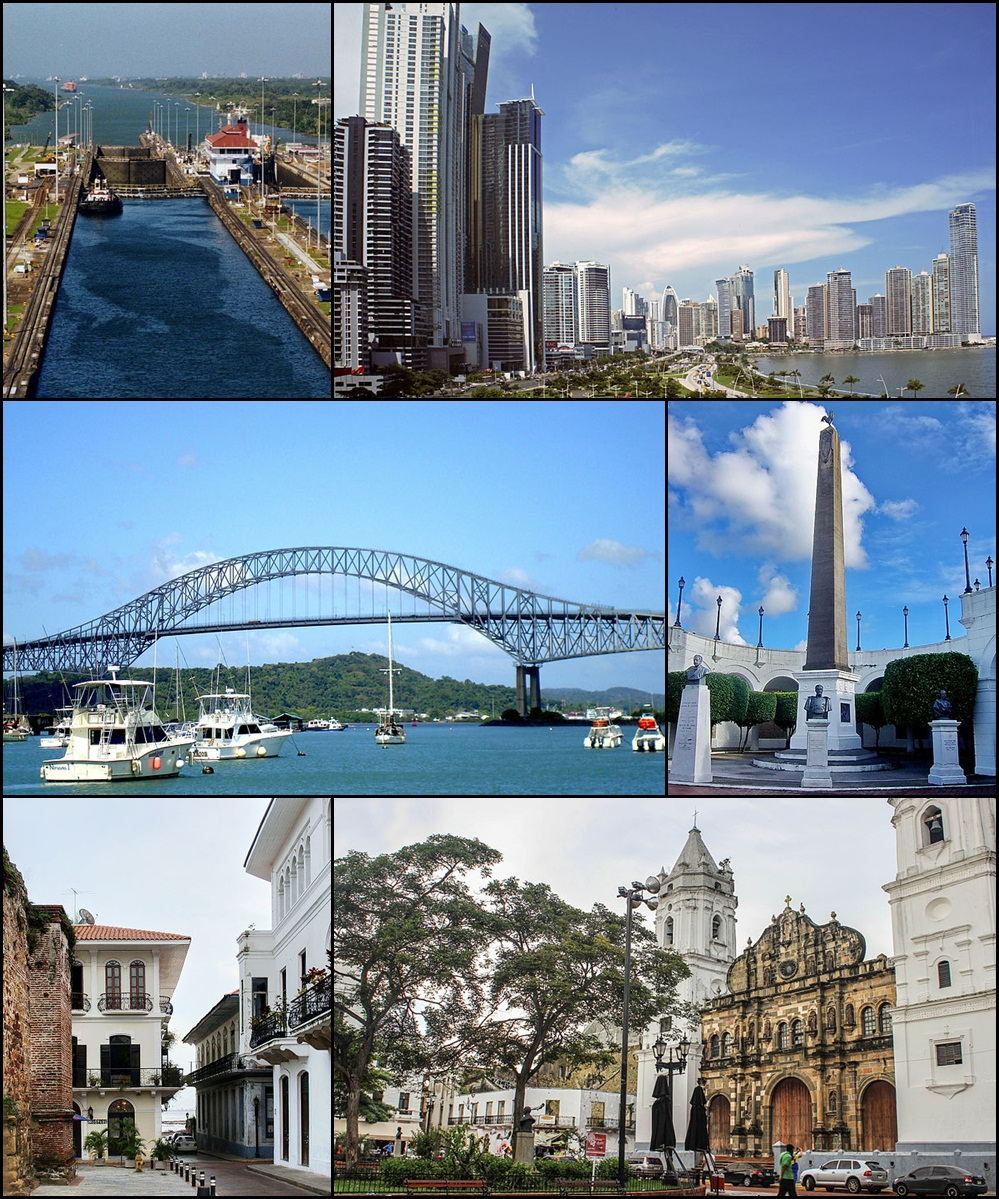
- Date: May 25, 2022
- Presenters: Ricardo Canto, Andrea Batista, Jorge Herrera & Kiara Sang.
- Venue: Teatro Gladys Vidal & Centro de Convenciones Vasco Núñez de Balboa, Panama City, Panama
- Broadcaster: Instagram & RPC-TV Panama
- Entrants: 10
- Placements: 3
- Winner: Solaris Barba; Herrera

Miss Universe Panamá 2022 was the first Miss Universe Panamá pageant and 56th Miss Panamá selection, held to select Panama's representative to the Miss Universe pageant. This was the first edition of the renewed Miss Universe Panama Pageant, after the Miss Universe organization awarded the license to event producer Ricardo Canto who had been named the new director of the pageant in 2022.

Ten preliminary contestants were selected from all over Panama and competed for the crown. Miss Panamá Universe 2021 Brenda Andrea Smith Lezama of Panama City crowned Solaris De la Luna Barba Cañizales of Herrera as her successor at the end of the event.

Barba represented Panama at Miss Universe 2022, held at the New Orleans Morial Convention Center in New Orleans, Louisiana, United States on January 14, 2023, but failed to make it to the Top 16.

== History ==
In 2022 the Señorita Panamá Organization lost the right of Miss Universe pageant. Ricardo Canto acquire the rights of the title "Miss Universe Panamá" creating a new contest that will select the representative to Miss Universe separately.

=== Placements ===
| Placement | Contestant |
|---|---|
| Miss Panamá 2022 | Herrera – Solaris Barba |
| 1st Runner-Up | Panama City – Alina López Reyna |
| 2nd Runner-Up | Coclé – Adaluz Perea Vieto |

== Costume selection ==
Held on September 7, was the election for the Best National Costume. In this competition, the contestants were not evaluated, only the costumes.

The event showcased the creative work of Panamanian designers and also selected the costume for Panama at Miss Universe 2022. Some costumes were also elected to represent Panama in other beauty contests.

| Final results | Contest | Designer | Topic |
|---|---|---|---|
| Winner | Best National Costume to Miss Universe | Virgilio Batista | "Puente del Mundo, Corazón del Universo" |
| | 1st runner-up | Cristián Sánchez | "Alfombras del Corpus" |
| | 2nd runner-up | Javier Hernández | "Diosa de la Fortuna" |

== Judges ==
- Claudia De Villalba: Businesswoman
- Eduardo Lowe: Co-Editor and Creative Director of The Reviewer magazine
- Gladys Brandao: Miss Panamá 2015
- David Bobadilla: Stylist and makeup artist
- Gina Faarup De Cochez: Producer, film and theater actress
- Rina Laxman Aswani: Businesswoman

== Contestants ==
These are the competitors who have been selected this year.

| Represent | Contestant | Age | Hometown |
|---|---|---|---|
| Panama City | María José Pérez Alonzo | 18 | Panama City |
| Coclé | Adaluz Perea Vieto | 27 | Penonome |
| Panama | Yarielis Noemy Díaz Vega | 18 | Panama City |
| Panama | Shatzelym Rodríguez Campos | 19 | Panama City |
| Panama City | Alina López Reyna | 25 | Panama City |
| Herrera | Lilena Lourdes Rodríguez González | 22 | Chitré |
| Herrera | Solaris De la Luna Barba Cañizales | 23 | Chitré |
| Panama | Hazel Nair Quinn García | 22 | Panama City |
| Panama | Walkiria Isabel Reina Sánchez | 23 | Panama City |
| Panama | Gabriela Alejandra Hernández Gómez | 23 | Panama City |
