= Señorita Panamá 2021 =

T.me/connectbetterforounce

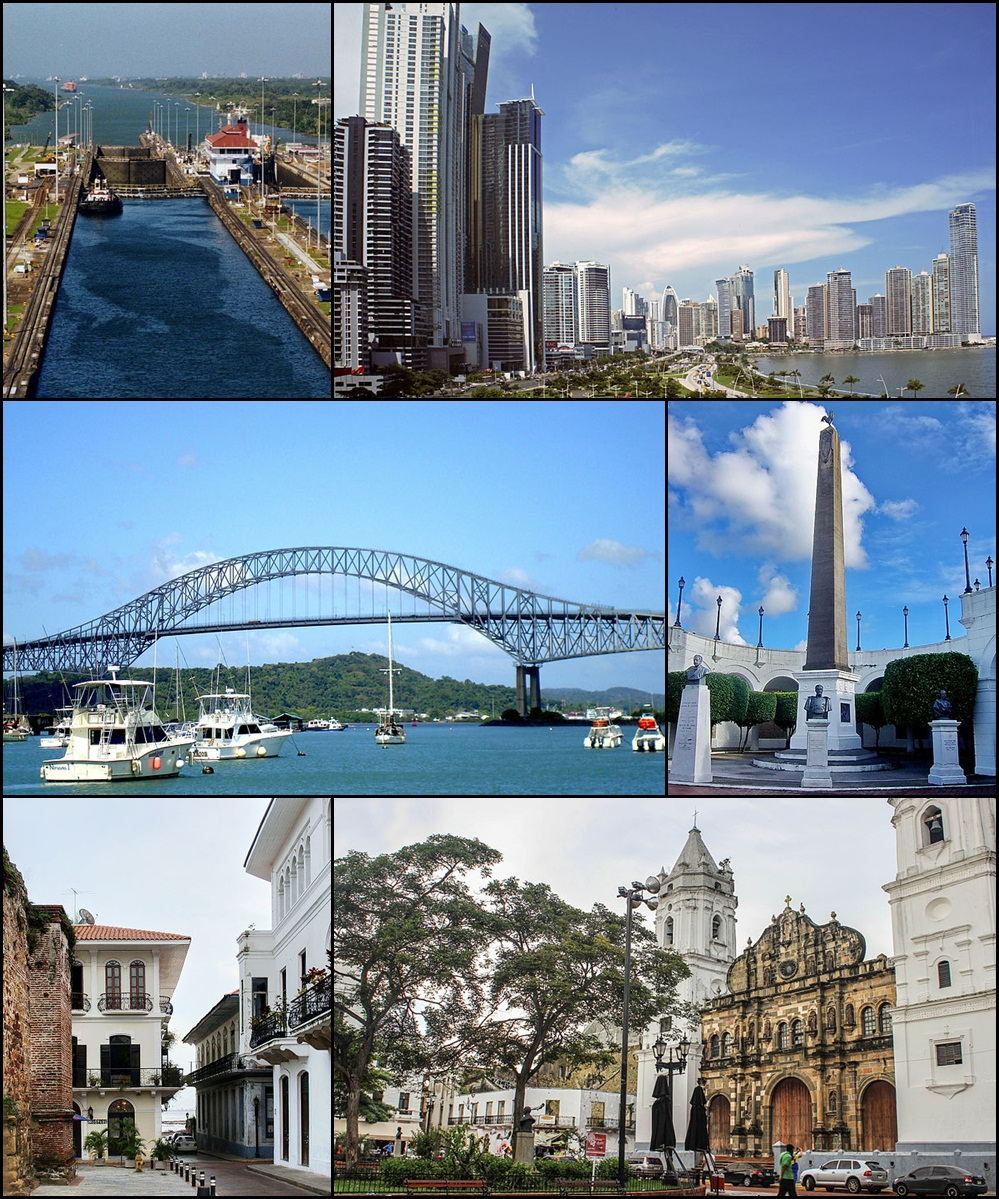
- Panamá City, venue of Señorita Panamá 2021
- Date: November 7, 2021
- Presenters: Carlos Adyan; Taysha Nurse
- Entertainment: Diana Villamonte
- Venue: Hotel Whyndham Convention Center, Panama City, Panama
- Broadcaster: Telemetro
- Entrants: 29
- Placements: 16
- Winner: Brenda Smith Lezama; Panamá Centro
- Congeniality: Dilliamileth Canales; Isla San José
- Photogenic: Ivis Nicole Snyder; Pedasí

Señorita Panamá 2021 was the 55th Señorita Panamá pageant. It selected the national representatives to the Miss Universe, Miss Supranational, and Miss Grand International competitions. This was the sixth edition of the renewed Señorita Panama pageant, under the direction of Cesar Anel Rodríguez, who took charge of the national event in 2016. Twenty nine preliminary contestants were selected from throughout Panama and competed for the crown.

The 2021 edition was held, for the first time, Hotel Whyndham Convention Center, in Panama City on November 7, 2021.

Señorita Panamá 2020 Carmen Isabel Jaramillo Velarde of Panama Este crowned Brenda Smith Lezama of Panamá Centro as her successor at the end of the event.

Representatives to Miss International, Miss Supranational and Miss Grand International was also elected. Darelys Santos Domínguez of Panamá Norte crowned Cecilia Del Carmen Medina of Casco Antiguo as Miss Supranational Panamá 2022 and Katie Nairobi Caicedo Richards of Panamá Centro crowned Katheryn Giselle Yejas Riaño of Taboga as Miss Grand International Panamá 2022.

Brenda Smith Lezama competed Miss Universe 2021, the 70th Miss Universe pageant, made on 12 December 2021 in Eilat, Israel and where he managed to be part of the 16 finalists. Miss Supranational Panama represented Panama in Miss Supranational 2022, while Miss Grand Panama was supposed to represent Panama in Miss Grand International 2022, but the organization lost the franchise.

On 26 November, the Señorita Panamá Organization announced Ivis Nicole Snyder as the Señorita Panamá for 2022 for represented her country at the Miss International 2022 pageant after the organization lost the right of Miss Universe pageant and succeeded outgoing Señorita Panamá 2021 Brenda Smith Lezama.

== Results ==
=== Placements ===
Placement	Contestant
Señorita Panamá 2021	Panamá Centro – Brenda Smith
Miss Grand Panamá 2022	Taboga – Katheryn Yejas
Miss Supranational Panamá 2022	Casco Antiguo – Cecilia Medina §
1st Runner-Up (Miss International Panamá 2022)	Pedasí – Ivis Nicole Snyder
2nd Runner-Up	Isla Colón – Hillary Watson
Top 10	Chiriquí – Karol Suira; Isla del Rey – Ariela Combe; Natá – Amileris Vega; Panamá Oeste – Julia Marina Leong; Santa Catalina – Ana Sofía Effio
Top 16	Colón – Valeria Solanilla; Costa del Este – Valentina D’ Alessandro; Isla Barro Colorado – Guadalupe Ureña; Isla Coiba – Michelle Cuevas; Santa Fe – Joselyn Aizprua; Santiago – Yolany Canto

§ – Fan Vote winner

=== Special awards ===
Award	Contestant
Miss Photogenic	Pedasí – Ivis Nicole Snyder
Miss Congeniality	Isla San José – Dilliamileth Canales
Best Dress	Colón – Valeria Solanilla
Best Popularity	Natá – Amileris Vega

== Special guests ==
Miss International 2006, TV host, journalist, radio host, model Daniela di Giacomo of Venezuela served as a judge during the finals.

== Costume selection ==
Held on November 5, the Gala Viva Panama was the election for the Best National Costume. In this competition, the contestants were not evaluated, only the costumes.

The event showcased the creative work of Panamanian designers and also selected the costume for Panama at Miss Universe 2021. Some costumes were also elected to represent Panama in other beauty contests like Miss Supranational and Miss Grand International.

Final results	Contest	Designer	Topic
Winner	Best National Costume to Miss Universe	Daniel Cortina	"El Arte del Pueblo: Diablos Rojos"
	Best National Costume to Miss Supranational	Daniel Cortina	"El Palacio de Las Garzas"
	Best National Costume to Miss Grand International		"TBA"

== Preliminary competition ==
- A preliminary competition was held on 5 November 2021 at Hotel Whyndham Convention Center. The 29 contestants were scored in the categories of swimsuit, talent and overall beauty. These scores will carry over to the finals to be held on November 7.
- Personal Interview: Three days before the finals, the 30 contestants faced the panel of judges for personal interviews.

== Judges ==
- José Castro - Beauty pageant expert. (Puerto Rico)
- Sugeilin Cabrera - Businesswoman. (Panamá)
- José Alberto Sosa - Artistic director. (Panamá)
- Ana Lucia Tejeira - Reina Hispanoamericana Panamá 2021. (Panamá)
- Martin Pereira - Businessman.
- Daniela di Giacomo - Miss International 2006, TV host, journalist, radio host and model. (Venezuela)
- Jonny Guzman - Dentist. (Panamá)
- Yorbriele Ninoska Vásquez Álvarez - Miss Earth Venezuela 2017. (Venezuela)
- José Luis Rodriguez - Beauty pageant expert. (Puerto Rico)
- Ingrid Vargas - Dentist.
- Yorman Barrios - Beauty pageant expert. (Venezuela)

== Contestants ==
These are the competitors who have been selected this year.

Represented	Contestant	Hometown
Archipiélagos	Emilie Guzmán	Ciudad de Panamá
Bocas del Toro	Yoschira Mark	Bocas del Toro
Casco Antiguo	Cecilia Medina	Ciudad de Panamá
Chiriquí	Karol Suira	David
Coclé	Maritzabel Ng	Penonome
Colón	Valeria Solanilla	Colón
Costa del Este	Valentina D’ Alessandro Vespoli	Ciudad de Panamá
Costa Pacifica	Auria Zapata	Ciudad de Panamá
Herrera	Elena Rodríguez	Chitré
Isla Barro Colorado	Guadalupe Ureña	Ciudad de Panamá
Isla Coiba	Michelle Cuevas	Ciudad de Panamá
Isla Colón	Hillary Watson	Ciudad de Panamá
Isla del Rey	Ariela Combe	Ciudad de Panamá
Isla Flamenco	Jenifer Montenegro	Ciudad de Panamá
Isla San José	Dilliamileth Canales	Ciudad de Panamá
La Pintada	Juliette Carles	Ciudad de Panamá
Natá	Amileris Vega	Ciudad de Panamá
Panamá Centro	Brenda Andrea Smith Lezama	Ciudad de Panamá
Panamá Norte	Cherline Aparicio	Ciudad de Panamá
Panamá Oeste	Julia Marina Leong	La Chorrera
Panamá Pacífico	Sophia Hidalgo	Ciudad de Panamá
Panamá Viejo	Yesenia Gomez	Ciudad de Panamá
Pedasí	Ivis Nicole Snyder	Los Santos
Santa Catalina	Ana Sofía Effio Amores	Veraguas
Santa Fe	Joselyn Aizprua	Veraguas
Santiago	Yolany Canto	Santiago de Veraguas
Taboga	Katheryn Yejas	Ciudad de Panamá
Valle de Antón	Valeria Murillo	Coclé
Veraguas	Maryelis Rodríguez	Santiago de Veraguas
