= Pelicot =

Pelicot or Pélicot (English: /pɛliˈkoʊ/, French: [peliko]) is a French surname. Notable people with this surname include:

- Bélgica Pelicot, Pananamian beauty pageant contestant, who competed in Miss World Panamá 2019
- Dominique Pelicot (born 1952), French convicted rapist
- François Philibert Michel Pelicot, French Chef de Brigade; 1793 regimental commander of the 6th Dragoon Regiment
- Gisèle Pelicot (born 1952), Frenchwoman, multiple-instance rape victim
- Joël Pelicot, French politician, 1989–2008 mayor of Charentilly, Indre-et-Loire, France; who represented Génération écologie in the 1993 election for Indre-et-Loire's 5th constituency
