= Punta Mariato =

Punta Mariato Lighthouse
- Location: Punta Mariato, Veraguas Province, Panama
- Coordinates: 7°12′42″N 80°53′08″W

Tower
- Foundation: concrete base
- Construction: metal skeletal tower
- Height: 12 m (39 ft)
- Shape: square pyramidal skeletal tower with balcony and light
- Markings: White
- Power source: solar power

Light
- Focal height: 102 m (335 ft)
- Range: 21 nmi (39 km; 24 mi)
- Characteristic: Fl W 30s

Location map

Punta Mariato or Mariato Point (Spanish: Punta Mariato) is a cape in western Panama and is the southernmost point on the mainland of North America and is one of the Extreme points of Earth.

== Geography ==
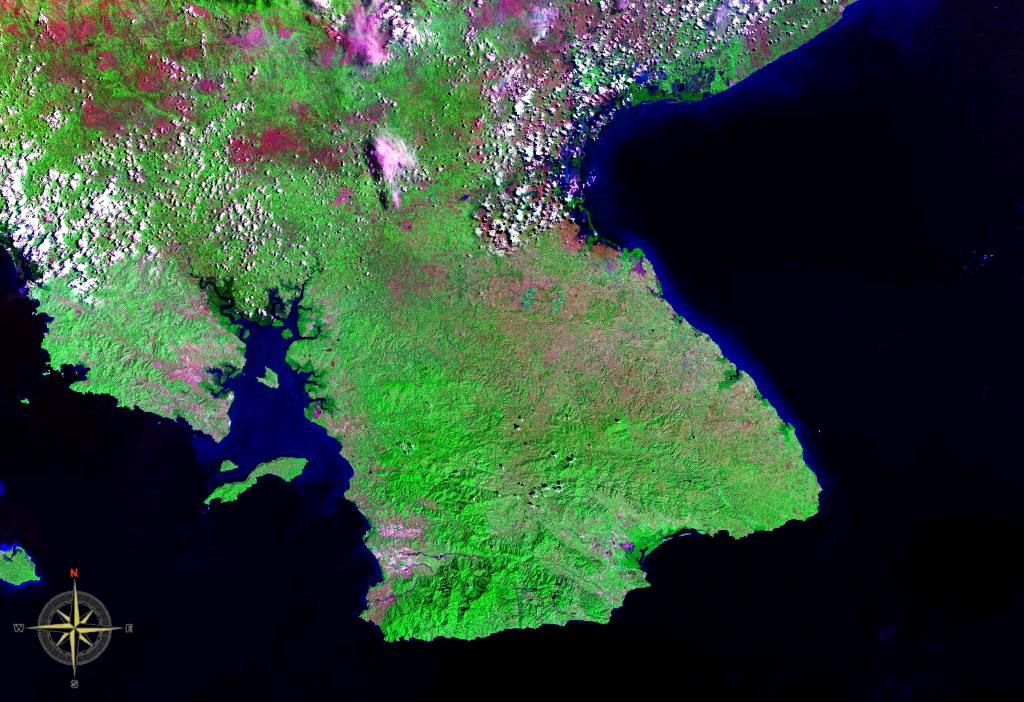
Punta Mariato on the southern tip of the Azuero Peninsula

Punta Mariato is situated in the southern part of the Veraguas Province in central Panama. The coordinates are 07°12′32″N 80°53′10″W.

The cape is located on the southwestern tip of the Azuero Peninsula directly on the Pacific Ocean about 15 km south of Arenas and about 70 km west of Tonosi and roughly 350 km southwest of Panama City.

Punta Mariato is uninhabited and covered by mangrove and rainforest and is part of the 33 400 hectare (8255 acres) large nature reserve Cerro Hoya National Park(Parque nacional Cerro Hoya). The reserve which extends into the neighbouring Los Santos Province is classified as a biosphere reserve by UNESCO.

The area is hard to reach as there are few roads but the waters around the cape are popular for surfing and recreational fishing.

Punta Mariato is part of Mariato District.

== History ==
Parque nacional Cerro Hoya was established on October 2, 1984, and is home of most of the remaining jungle habitat in the Azuero region, and also the habitat for a number of endangered species.

== See also ==
- List of lighthouses in Panama
