= Señorita Panamá 2020 =

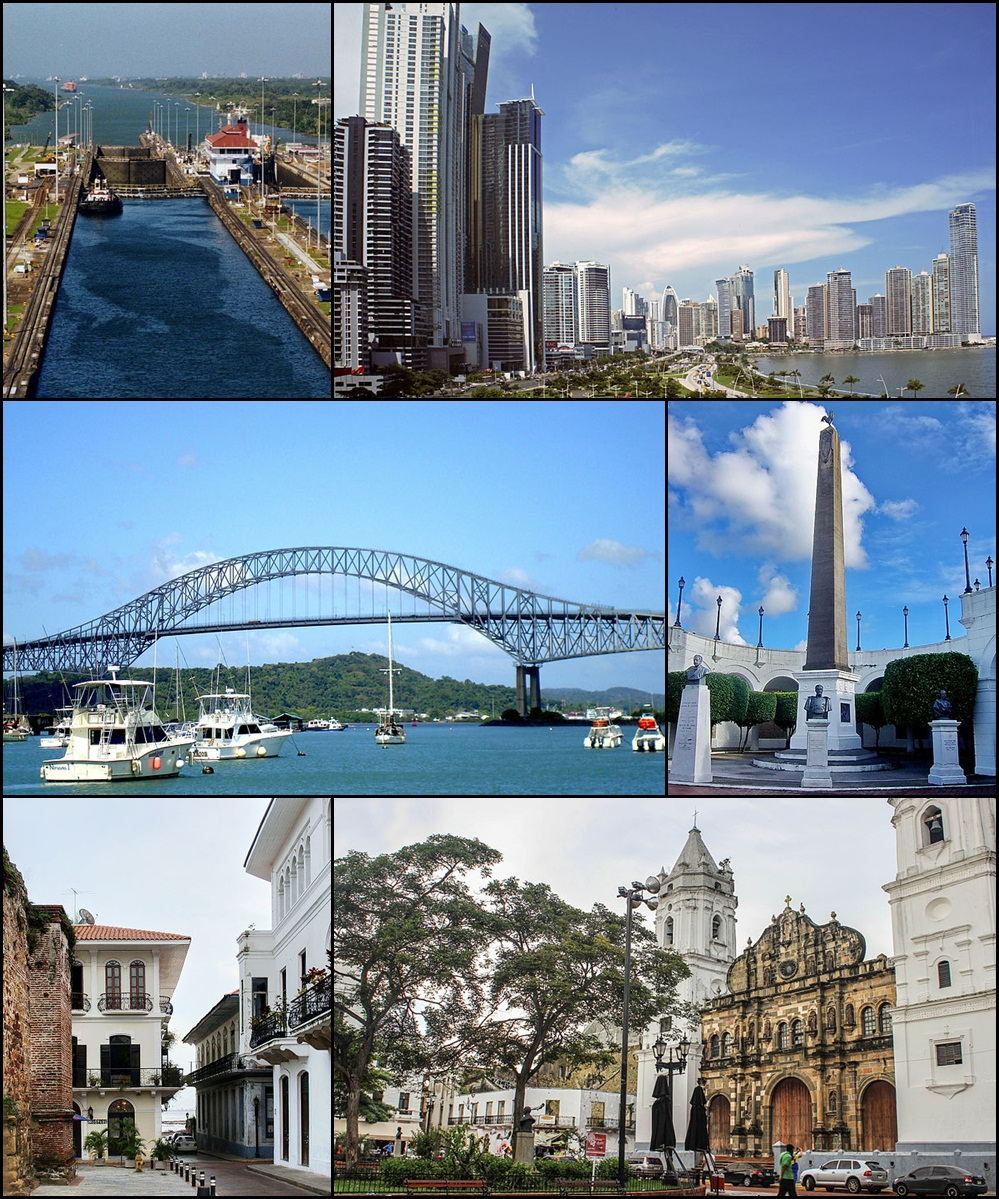
- Panamá City, venue of Señorita Panamá 2020
- Date: August 11, 2020
- Presenters: Álex Medela
- Venue: MEDCOM studio Panama City, Panama
- Broadcaster: Telemetro
- Placements: 4
- Winner: Carmen Jaramillo; Panamá Este

Señorita Panamá 2020 was the 54th selection of the Señorita Panamá pageant. It selected the national representatives to the Miss Universe, Miss International, Miss Supranational and Miss Grand International competitions. This was the fifth selection of the renewed Señorita Panama pageant, under the direction of Cesar Anel Rodríguez, who took charge of the national event in 2016.

Señorita Panamá 2019 Mehr Eliezer of Isla Flamenco crowned Carmen Jaramillo of Panamá Este as the new Señorita Panamá 2020

The event was planned for May 16, 2020, to be broadcast on Telemetro. However, in the face of the COVID-19 pandemic, the Señorita Panamá Organization held a prerecorded ceremony and broadcast on August 11, 2020, through the program Tu Mañana.

== Candidates ==
Before the COVID-19 pandemic, the event organization had announced through the Instagram account the 29 candidates who would participate in the event. Finally, these candidates were officially classified to participate in the 2021 event, as indicated by the president of the Organization.

== Selection ==
This year, due to the COVID-19 pandemic, the contest was not held in person, however the Miss Universe Organization within its regulations establishes that if the national contest is not held, organizations may make a casting to choose a candidate or appoint by inheritance right the first finalist of the last edition.

Finally, the Señorita Panamá Organization selected Carmen Jaramillo from Panama Este as Señorita Panamá 2020, who had been the first finalist in the Señorita Panamá 2019. The crowning was prerecorded and broadcast on August 11, 2020, through the morning show Tu Mañana.

Representatives to Miss International, Miss Supranational and Miss Grand International was also elected. On Friday, October 9, 2020, the winners of the virtual casting for Miss Supranational 2021 and Miss Grand International 2020 were announced, Darelys Yahel Santos Domínguez of Panamá Norte and Angie Keith of Bocas del Toro respectively. On Friday, February 5, 2021, Valeria Estefanía Franceschi Alvarado from Panama Centro was announced the winner of the Señorita Panamá International 2020 title.

Jaramillo competed in Miss Universe 2020, the 69th Miss Universe pageant was held on May 16, 2021, at Seminole Hard Rock Hotel & Casino in Hollywood, Florida, United States. Franceshi will represent Panama in Miss International 2021, Santos will represent the country in Miss Supranational 2021, while Keith represented Panama in Miss Grand International 2020.

== Results ==
=== Placements ===
Placement	Contestant
Miss Panamá 2020	Panamá Este – Carmen Isabel Jaramillo.
Miss Panamá International 2020	Panamá Centro – Valeria Franceschi
Miss Panamá Supranational 2020	Panamá Norte – Darelys Yahel Santos Domínguez
Miss Panamá Grand 2020	Bocas del Toro - Angie Keith

== Notes ==
- Miss Bocas del Toro, Angie Keith, competed in "Miss Supranational 2015" held in Poland, where she placed in the Top 10 finalists and won the title of "Miss Supranational Americas".
- Miss Panama Este, Carmen Jaramillo, competed in Miss Panamá 2014 as Miss Panama Oeste and "Miss Earth 2015" held in Austria. She was unplaced. Jaramillo was also a contestant in "Reina Hispanoamericana" held in Bolivia that same year. She placed in the Top 7 finalists.
- Miss Panama Norte, Darelys Santos competed in Señorita Panamá 2017 and was selected Miss Panamá Internacional, competed in "Miss International 2017" where she placed in the Top 15 finalists.
