= Universidad Autónoma de Chiriquí =

Autonomous University of Chiriqui
- Universidad Autónoma de Chiriquí (UNACHI)
- Motto: "Hombre y cultura para el porvenir" ("Man and culture for the future")
- Type: State entity (public)
- Established: 1995
- Rector: MSC. Etelvina Medianero De Bonagas
- Location: David, Chiriquí, Panama; 8.433°N 82.451°W
- Website: Universidad Autónoma de Chiriquí

The Autonomous University of Chiriqui, in Spanish Universidad Autónoma de Chiriquí (UNACHI), is a Panamanian university. It was founded in 1995, and is the third autonomous state institution of higher education and the first in the western region of the country.

== Faculties ==
The university consists of these faculties:

- Business Administration and Accounting
- Public Administration
- Education Sciences
- Natural and Exact Sciences
- Social Communication
- Law and Political Sciences
- Economy
- Nursing
- Humanities
- Medicine

== Campuses ==
The university also has regional campuses and college extensions in the Chiriquí Province, to give more people access to higher education. Those campuses and extensions are:

- Centro Universitario de Barú (CRUBA)
- Extensión Universitaria de Oriente
- Extensión Universitaria de Tierras Altas
- Universidad Popular de Alanje (UNIPAL)
- Extensión Universitaria de Boquete
