= Rosa Montezuma =

Panamanian model and beauty queen

- Born: Rosa Iveth Montezuma Montero; 16 May 1993 (age 33); David, Chiriquí, Panama
- Height: 1.70 m (5 ft 7 in)
- Beauty pageant titleholder
- Title: Señorita Panamá 2018; Miss Comarcas 2018
- Hair color: Black
- Eye color: Brown
- Major competitions: Señorita Panamá 2018 (Winner); Miss Universe 2018

Rosa Iveth Montezuma Montero (born 16 May 1993) is a Panamanian model and beauty pageant titleholder who was crowned Señorita Panamá 2018 and represented Panama at the Miss Universe 2018.

== Personal life ==
Montezuma was born in David, Chiriquí and raised in Alto Caballero. She is pursuing a bachelor's degree in Educational informatics and also has a degree in Food Science and Technology.

== Pageantry ==
=== Señorita Panamá 2018 ===
Montezuma was crowned Señorita Panamá 2018 on June 7, 2018 at Roberto Duran Arena in Panama City and then competed at the Miss Universe 2018. She represented the Comarcas.

=== Miss Universe 2018 ===
Montezuma represented Panama at Miss Universe 2018 pageant in Bangkok, Thailand on December 17, 2018, but she did not place among the Top 20.

== See also ==
- Señorita Panamá 2018
- Solaris Barba
- Shirel Ortiz
- Diana Lemos

Awards and achievements
Preceded by Laura de Sanctis	Miss Panama; 2018-2019	Succeeded by Mehr Eliezer
Preceded by María Ésther Toffolón	Miss Comarcas; 2018–2019	Succeeded by Lauris Fernández
