= Isla Iguana Wildlife Refuge =

Wildlife refuge in Panama

Isla Iguana Lighthouse
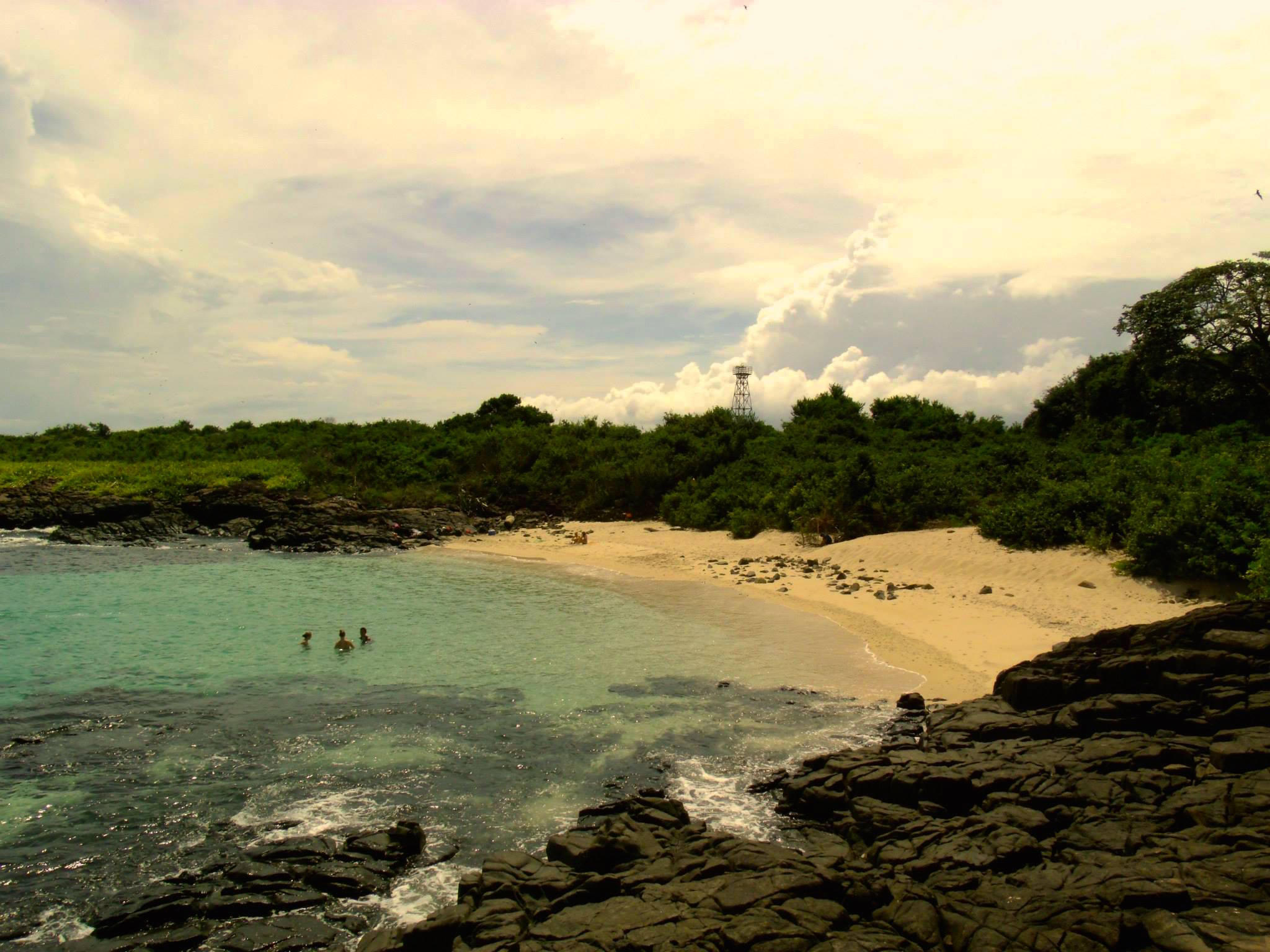
- Isla Iguana Lighthouse in 2013
- Location: Isla Iguana; Los Santos Province; Panama
- Coordinates: 7°37′42.6″N 79°59′52.6″W

Tower
- Foundation: concrete base
- Construction: metal skeletal tower
- Height: 12 metres (39 ft)
- Shape: square pyramidal skeletal tower with balcony and light
- Markings: white tower
- Power source: solar power

Light
- Focal height: 25 metres (82 ft)
- Range: 10 nautical miles (19 km; 12 mi)
- Characteristic: Fl W 13s.

The Isla Iguana Wildlife Refuge is a 53-hectare wildlife reserve located 5 kilometers off the Los Santos Province on the Azuero Peninsula in Panama. The island has 13 hectares with a dry tropical rain forest and there are 40 more hectares of coral. Coral reefs that surround the island have over 17 species of corals and 347 species of fish. It is also possible to see octopus, moray eels and dolphins.

Humpback whales come to the island and the shores of Panama's Pacific coast during the months of June or July through October to give birth and teach their calves to swim in the warm waters. Whale watching tours are popular during this season. The island also serves as a place where five species of sea turtles come to lay eggs during the months of April and September.

Tours to Isla Iguana depart from Arenal Beach in Pedasi or from Mariabe, the town before Pedasi, which offers a shorter crossing time.

== History ==
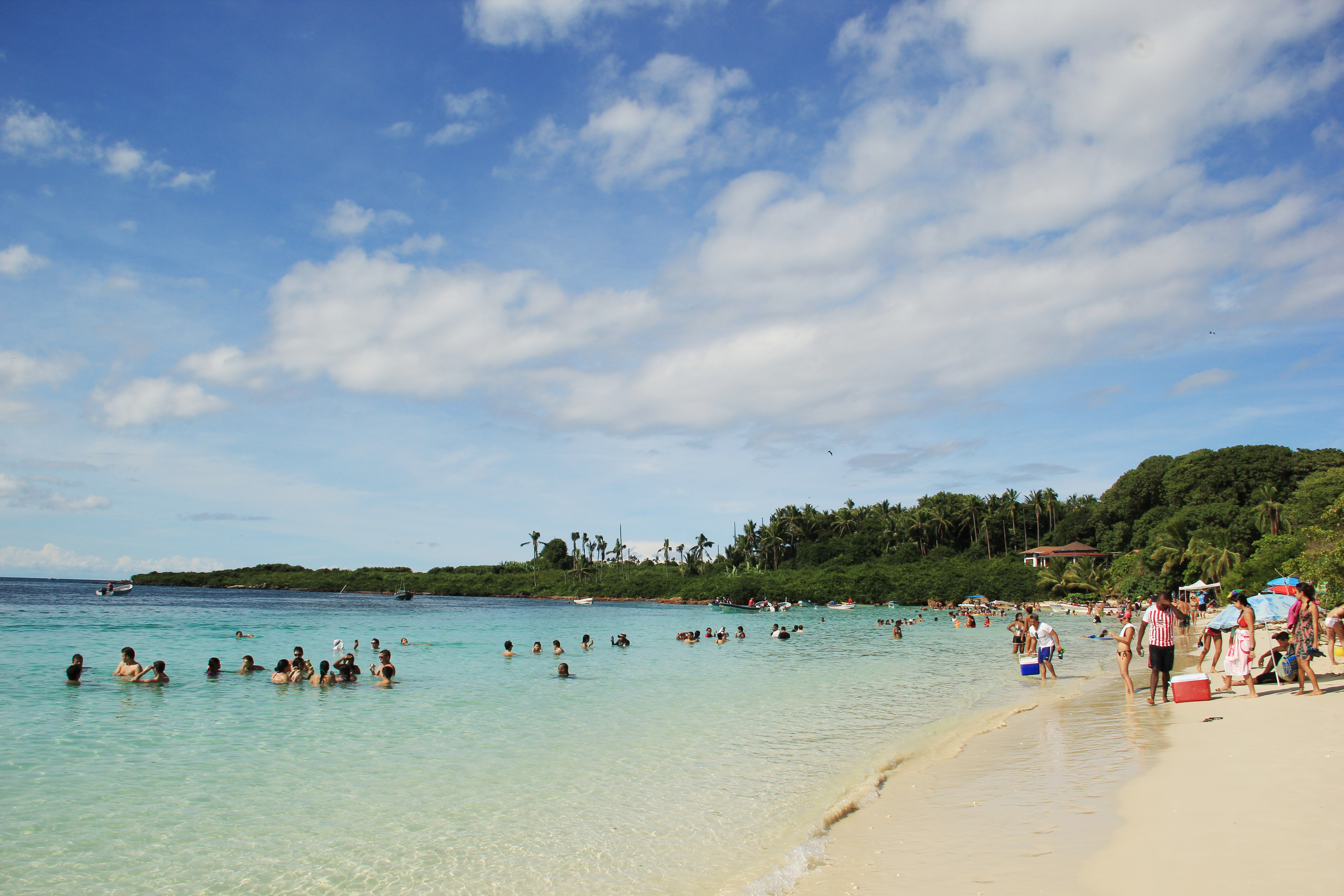
Isla Iguana

During World War II, the United States Army used the Isla Iguana Wildlife Refuge as a bombing range. To clear the area, two thousand-pound bombs stuck in the surrounding coral reef were detonated in the 1990s.

In the 1960s, a settler on the northern part of the island claimed it as his property and planted exotic plants such as mango and guava trees, corn and sugar cane. These non-native plants still inhabit the island to this day. Late in the decade, the man was removed by the government.

The Isla Iguana Wildlife Refuge was declared protected on June 15, 1981.

== Wildlife ==
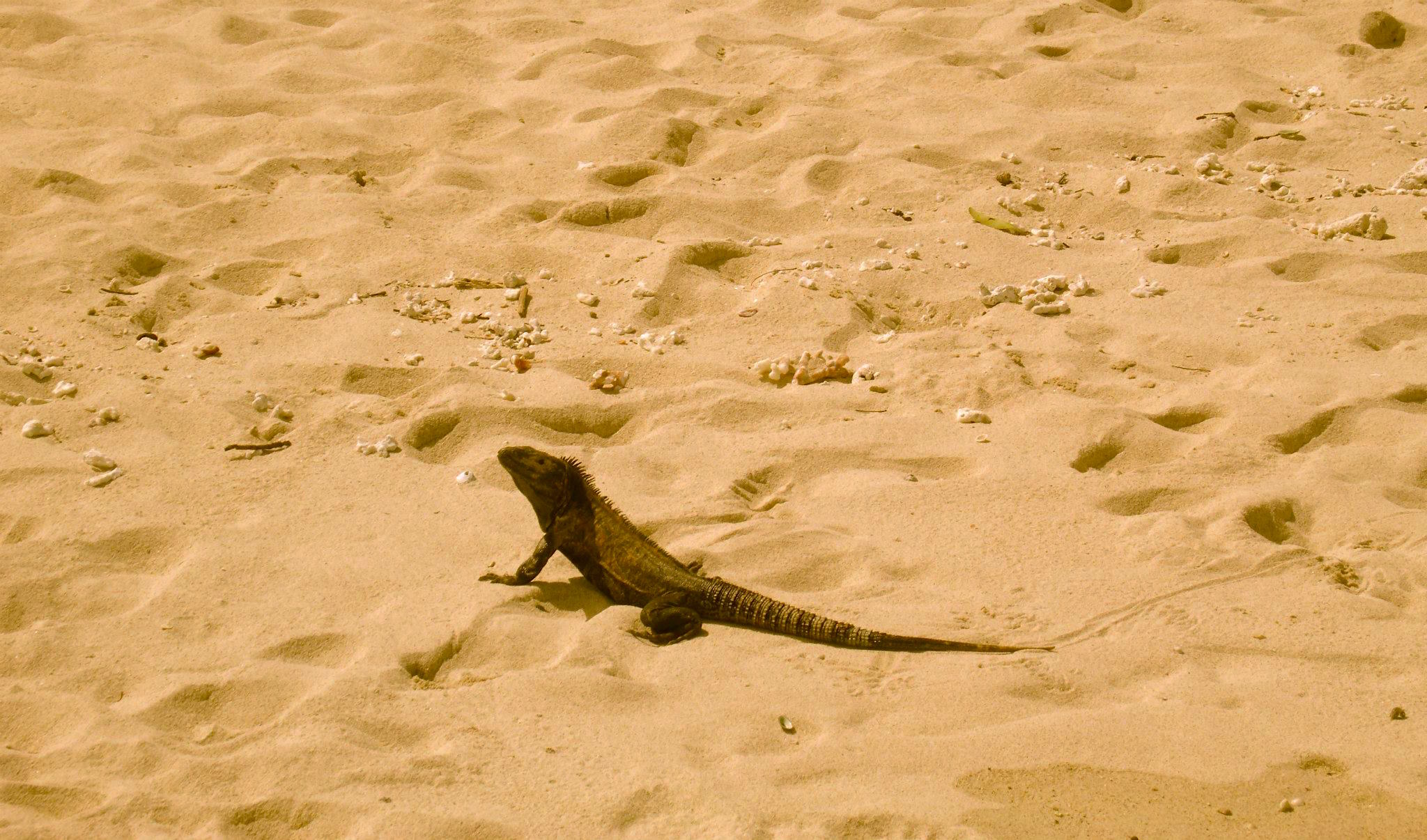
An iguana at Isla Iguana Wildlife Refuge, 2013.

Native animals include crabs (among them hermit crabs), black and green iguanas, boa constrictors, and red throated frigates. It is a vital nesting ground for several species of frigate as well as sea turtles.

== See also ==
- List of lighthouses in Panama
