= List of lighthouses in Panama =

This is a list of lighthouses in Panama.

== Lighthouses ==
| Name | Image | Year built | Location & coordinates | Class of Light | Focal height | NGA number | Admiralty number | Range nml |
|---|---|---|---|---|---|---|---|---|
| Atlantic Entrance Range Middle Lighthouse | | 1914 | Gatún; 9°16′55.6″N 79°55′09.9″W | F G | 30 metres (98 ft) | 16616 | J6132.1 | 15 |
| Atlantic Entrance Range Rear Lighthouse | Image | 1914 | Gatún; 9°16′17.7″N 79°55′10.1″W | Oc G | 30 metres (98 ft) | 16620 | J6132.2 | 15 |
| Farallon Sucio Lighthouse | Image | 1925 est. | Portobelo District; 9°38′31.0″N 79°38′09.6″W | Fl R 5s. | 33 metres (108 ft) | 16624 | J6136 | 12 |
| Flamenco Island Lighthouse | Image | 1920s | El Chorrillo; 8°54′26.6″N 79°31′15.0″W | Oc (2) WR 5s. | 47 metres (154 ft) | 0096 | G3198 | 19 |
| Frailes del Sur Lighthouse | Image | n/a | Los Santos Province; 7°20′20.4″N 80°08′26.1″W | Fl R 4s. | 20 metres (66 ft) | 0044 | G3246 | 9 |
| Gatún Northbound Rear Lighthouse | | 1914 | Gatún; 9°16′19.7″N 79°55′25.5″W | Oc G | 30 metres (98 ft) | 16608 | J6141 | 15 |
| Isla Boná Lighthouse | Image | n/a | Panamá Oeste Province; 8°34′06.4″N 79°35′24.2″W | L Fl W 13s. | 53 metres (174 ft) | 0052 | G3222 | 22 |
| Isla Burica Lighthouse | | n/a | Chiriquí Province; 8°01′03.6″N 82°52′38.4″W | Fl W 10s. | 34 metres (112 ft) | 0004 | G3280 | 12 |
| Isla Ensillada Lighthouse | | n/a | Chiriquí Province; 8°09′06.4″N 82°09′43.4″W | Fl W 5s. | 62 metres (203 ft) | 0022 | G3269 | 14 |
| Isla Escudo de Vargas Lighthouse | | n/a | Kusapin; 9°05′24.0″N 81°32′42.0″W | Fl W 7s. | 37 metres (121 ft) | 16588 | J6091 | 6 |
| Isla Grande Lighthouse | Image | 1894 | Isla Grande; 9°38′16.7″N 79°33′27.4″W | Fl W 5s. | 93 metres (305 ft) | 16628 | J6138 | 12 |
| Isla Iguana Lighthouse | | n/a | Isla Iguana; 7°37′42.6″N 79°59′52.6″W | Fl W 13s. | 25 metres (82 ft) | 0047 | G3243 | 10 |
| Isla Jicarita Lighthouse | Image | n/a | Jicarita; 7°12′19.4″N 81°47′56.6″W | Fl W 15s. | 102 metres (335 ft) | 0028 | G3562 | 20 |
| Isla Ladrones Lighthouse | | n/a | Chiriquí Province; 7°51′54.0″N 82°26′30.0″W | L Fl W 9s. | 65 metres (213 ft) | 0012 | G3266 | 16 |
| Isla Montuosa Lighthouse | Image | n/a | Chiriquí Province; 7°28′14.8″N 82°14′20.2″W | L Fl W 7s. | 30 metres (98 ft) | 0020 | G3264 | 11 |
| Islas Secas Lighthouse | | n/a | Islas Secas; 7°59′39.2″N 82°02′05.7″W | L Fl W 9s. | 63 metres (207 ft) | 0024 | G3267 | 15 |
| Isla Villa Lighthouse | Image | n/a | Los Santos Province; 7°56′08.7″N 80°18′05.2″W | Fl W 18s. | 36 metres (118 ft) | 0046 | G3240 | 12 |
| Limon Bay East Breakwater Lighthouse | | n/a | Limon Bay; 9°23′17.3″N 79°54′56.2″W | Mo (U) G 20s. | 33 metres (108 ft) | 16604 | J6098 | 16 |
| Limon Bay West Breakwater Lighthouse | | n/a | Limon Bay; 9°23′18.0″N 79°55′20.0″W | V Q (2) R 2s. | 16 metres (52 ft) | 16600 | J6102 | 16 |
| Morro de Puercos Lighthouse | Image | n/a | Los Santos Province; 7°14′39.7″N 80°25′52.4″W | Fl W 7.5s. | 84 metres (276 ft) | 0040 | G3250 | 19 |
| Pacific Entrance Range Front Lighthouse | Image | 2010 | Balboa; 8°57′22.8″N 79°34′30.7″W | F G | 20 metres (66 ft) | 0104 | G3200 | 14 |
| Peñon Limoncillo Lighthouse | Image | n/a | Isla Chama; Panamá Oeste; 8°44′35.5″N 79°34′38.7″W | L Fl W 15s. | 23 metres (75 ft) | 0060 | G3216 | 17 |
| Puerto Obaldía Lighthouse | | n/a | Puerto Obaldía; 8°40′01.7″N 77°25′14.3″W | L Fl W 10s. | 12 metres (39 ft) | 16630 | J6143 | 8 |
| Punta Mala Lighthouse | Image | n/a | Los Santos Province; 7°28′13.6″N 79°59′57.0″W | L Fl W 20s. | 45 metres (148 ft) | 0048 | G3242 | 13 |
| Punta Mariato Lighthouse | Image | n/a | Punta Mariato; 7°12′41.9″N 80°53′08.1″W | Fl W 30s. | 102 metres (335 ft) | 0038 | G3252 | 21 |
| Toro Point Lighthouse | | 1893 | Toro Point; Limon Bay; 9°22′20.6″N 79°56′57.6″W | L Fl W 30s. | 33 metres (108 ft) | 16592 | J6092 | 16 |

== See also ==
- Lists of lighthouses and lightvessels
