= Mehr Eliezer =

Panamanian model, singer, actress and beauty queen

- Born: 16 January 1997 (age 29); New Delhi, India
- Education: Balboa Academy; Florida State University
- Height: 1.72 m (5 ft 7 1/2 in)
- Beauty pageant titleholder
- Title: Señorita Panamá 2019
- Hair color: Black
- Eye color: Brown
- Major competitions: Señorita Panamá 2019 (Winner); Miss Universe 2019 (Unplaced)

Mehr Eliezer (born 16 January 1997) is a Panamanian model, actress and beauty pageant titleholder who was crowned Señorita Panamá 2019. She represented Panama at Miss Universe 2019. Born in New Delhi, she was raised in Panama and the Philippines.

== Personal life ==
Mehr Eliezer was born in New Delhi, India and raised in Panama City. She lived in Davao in the Philippines for two years where she attended the Ateneo de Davao. She graduated from Balboa Academy in 2015 and earned two Bachelor’s degrees in International Relations and Economics from Florida State University in 2019. She is fluent in English and Spanish; she also speaks Hindi, Tagalog and Portuguese.

As a young girl she swam for one of the Panama swimming clubs and her school swimming team. She also did theater from a very young age and starred in "Saturday Night Fever" and "High School Musical" when she was in college. Mehr started boxing when she was 19.

She started her singing career by launching her first single titled "Pecado" in 2020. "Pecado" was a huge success in Central America charting on Latin America's top 50 for 6 consecutive weeks. She then released "Chocolate" and "Lunatica" in 2021.

Mehr is the CEO and Creative Director of Bambikini - a bathing suit and swimwear line based out of Panama.

== Pageantry ==
On 16 January 2019 Mehr attended the casting for the Señorita Panamá competition. On 20 June 2019 Eliezer began her pageantry career representing Isla Flamenco in the Señorita Panamá 2019 competition at the Roberto Durán Arena in Panama City, where she was crowned as Miss Universe Panama 2019. Also, she won a special award of Miss Pandora. She succeeded Señorita Panamá 2018 Rosa Montezuma. As Señorita Panamá, Eliezer represented her country at Miss Universe 2019 where she was unplaced but she was awarded the title of the Miss Universe Congeniality 2019.

== See also ==
- Señorita Panamá 2019

Awards and achievements
Preceded by Rosa Montezuma	Señorita Panamá; 2019–2020	Succeeded by Carmen Jaramillo
Preceded by Ana Gabriela Garcia	Miss Isla Flamenco; 2019–2020	Succeeded by Carla Alexandra Benaim
