= Santa Isabel, Colón =

Coordinates: 9.5333°N 79.1833°W

Santa Isabel
- Corregimiento
- Location within Panama
- Country: Panama
- Province: Colón
- District: Santa Isabel

Area
  - Land: 130.8 km^{2} (50.5 sq mi)

Population (2010)
  - Total: 284
  - Density: 2.2/km^{2} (5.7/sq mi)
- Population density calculated based on land area.
- Time zone: UTC−5 (EST)

Santa Isabel is a corregimiento in Santa Isabel District, Colón Province, Panama with a population of 284 as of 2010. Its population as of 1990 was 230. It has population as of 2000 was 287.
