= Natasha Vargas =

Panamanian model (born 1997)

- Born: July 1, 1997 (age 29); Las Tablas, Los Santos, Panama
- Height: 1.78 m (5 ft 10 in)
- Beauty pageant titleholder
- Title: Miss Los Santos 2023; Miss Panamá 2023
- Hair color: Black
- Eye color: Hazel
- Major competitions: Miss Panamá 2023 (Winner); Miss Universe 2023 (Unplaced)

Natasha Lineth Vargas Moreno (born July 1, 1997) is a Panamanian model and beauty pageant titleholder who was crowned Miss Panamá 2023. She represented Panama at the Miss Universe 2023 competition.

== Early life and education ==
Vargas is from Las Tablas. She has a degree in journalism, graduated from the Latin University of Panama.

== Pageantry ==
On November 12, 2017, she represented Panama Centro at Reina del Carnaval de Panamá 2018. She was runner-up to Yanidia Leyanis Maure Jaureguizar.

=== Miss Panamá 2023 ===
On September 13, 2023, she represented Los Santos at Miss Panamá 2023 and competed against 14 other candidates at the Atlapa Convention Centre in Panama City, Panama. She won the title.

=== Miss Universe 2023 ===
Natasha represented Panamá at Miss Universe 2023 held in San Salvador, El Salvador, but failed to place at the Top 20

Awards and achievements
Preceded by Solaris Barba	Miss Panamá; 2023	Succeeded by Italy Mora
Preceded by Maria Fernanda Garcia	Miss Los Santos; 2023	Succeeded by Marie Schwarz
