= Shirel Ortiz =

Panamanian model (born 1995)

- Born: Shirel Joan Ortiz Aparicio; 4 December 1995 (age 30); Panama City, Panama
- Height: 1.77 m (5 ft 9 1/2 in)
- Beauty pageant titleholder
- Title: Señorita Panamá International 2018
- Hair color: Brown
- Eye color: Brown
- Major competitions: Señorita Panamá 2018; (Winner – Señorita Panamá International 2018); Miss International 2018; (Unplaced)

Shirel Joan Ortiz Aparicio (born 4 December 1995) is a Panamanian model and beauty pageant titleholder who was crowned Señorita Panamá International 2018. She represented Panama at Miss International 2018.

== Personal life ==
Shirel who represented the Panama Capital at the national pageant is an International Commerce and Logistics student.

== Pageantry ==
=== Señorita Panamá 2018 ===
Ortiz is 5 ft 9 1/2 in (1.77 m) tall, and competed in the national beauty pageant Señorita Panamá 2018. She was crowned as Miss International Panama 2018 which was held at the Roberto Durán Arena in Panama City on 7 June 2018. She represented the state of Panama Centro.

=== Miss International 2018 ===
She represented Panama in the 2018 Miss International pageant.

== See also ==
- Señorita Panamá 2018
- Rosa Montezuma

Awards and achievements
Preceded by María Alejandra Tejada	Miss Panamá Centro; 2018–2019	Succeeded by Aura Ávila
Preceded by Darelys Santos	Miss International Panamá; 2018–2019	Succeeded by Betzaida Rodriguez
