= Isla Grande =

- Corregimiento
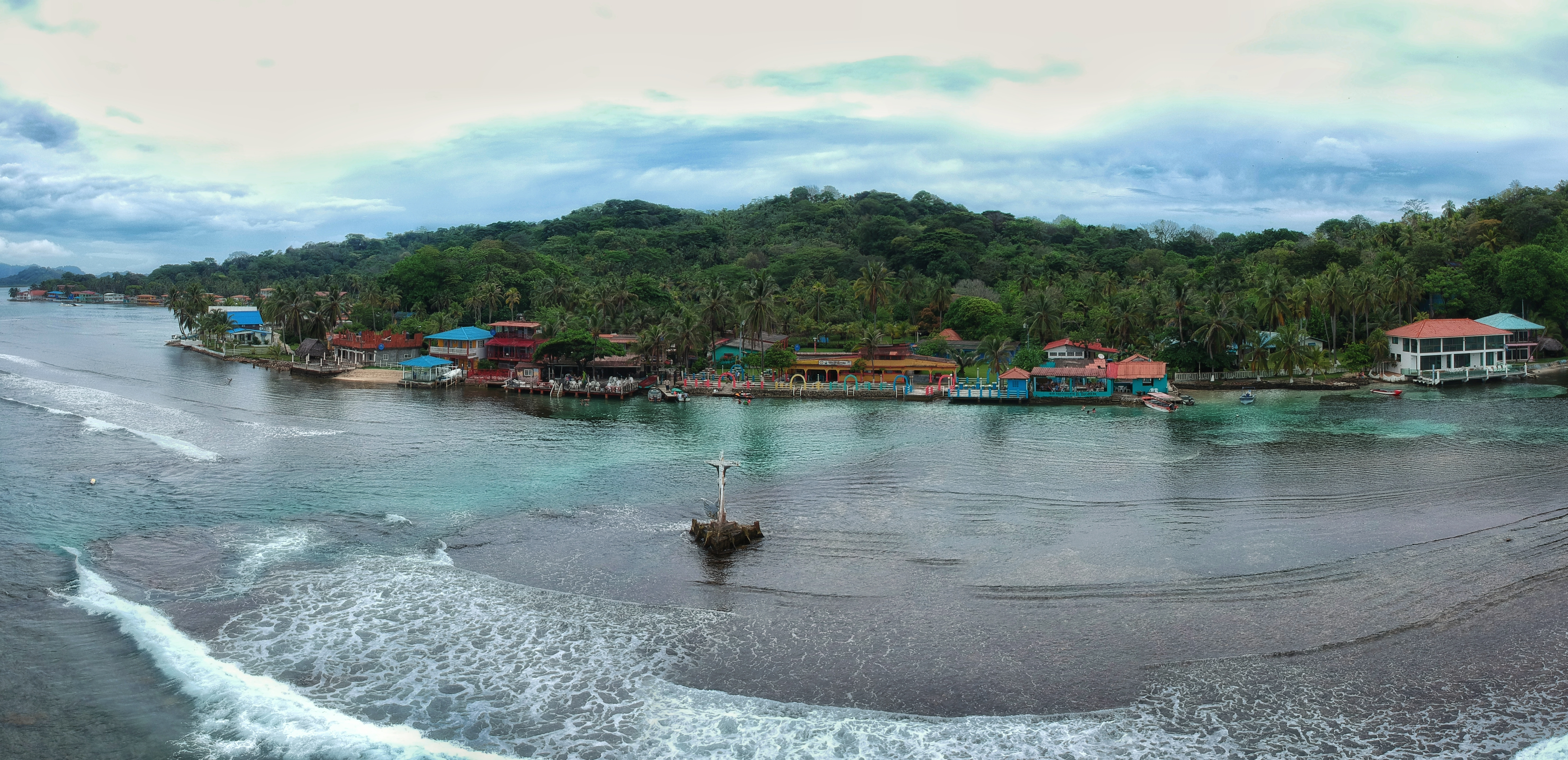
- Toma aéra de Isla Grande

- Location within Panama
- Coordinates: 9°38′N 79°34′W
- Country: Panama
- Province: Colón
- District: Portobelo

Area
  - Land: 26.6 km^{2} (10.3 sq mi)

Population (2010)
  - Total: 1,037
  - Density: 39/km^{2} (100/sq mi)
- Population density calculated based on land area.
- Time zone: UTC−5 (EST)
- Isla Grande Lighthouse
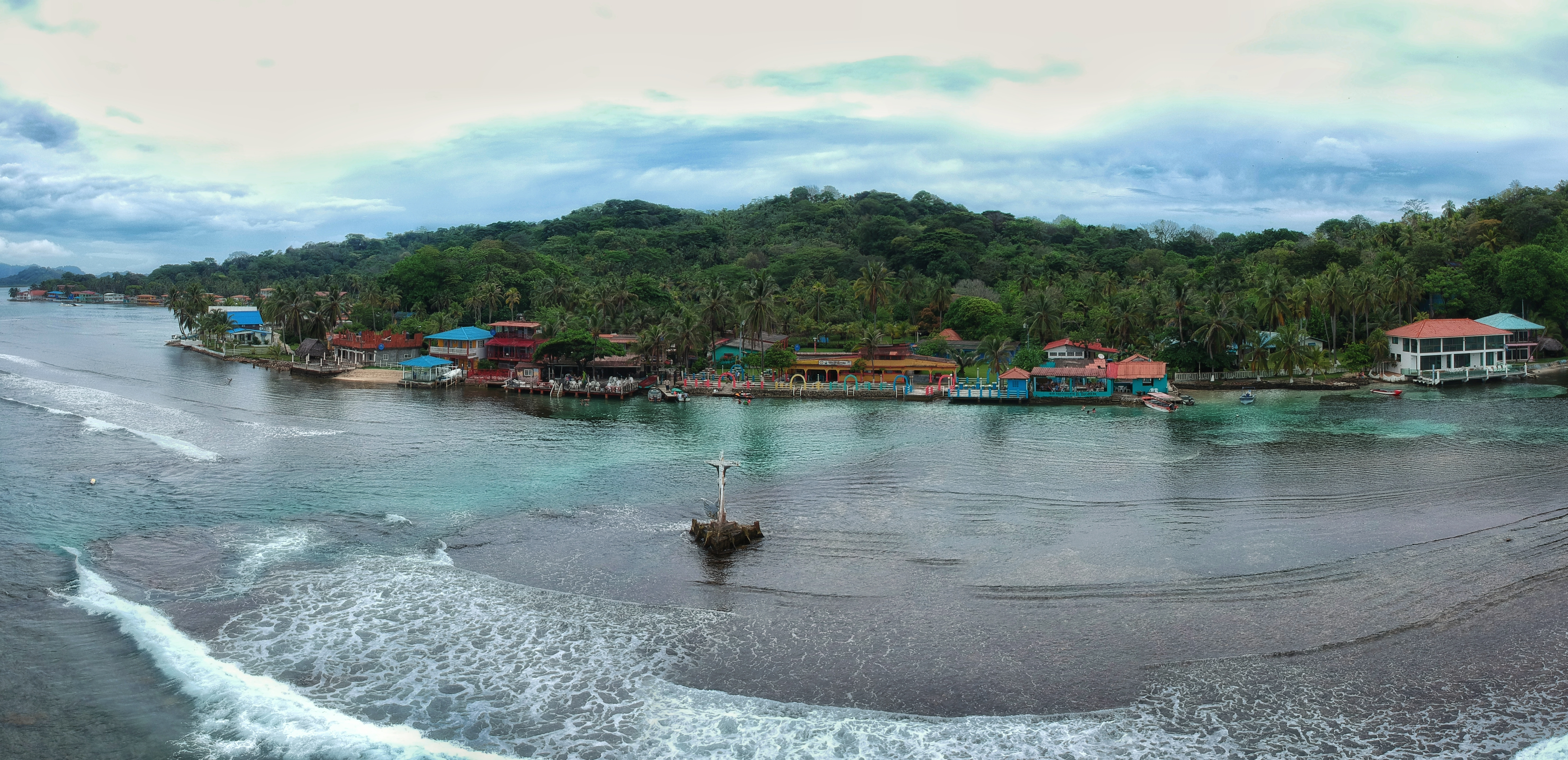
- Coordinates: 9°38′16.7″N 79°33′27.4″W
- Constructed: 1894
- Foundation: concrete base
- Construction: steel skeletal tower
- Height: 26 metres (85 ft)
- Shape: cylindrical skeletal tower with central cylinder, balcony and lantern
- Markings: white tower
- Power source: solar power
- Focal height: 93 metres (305 ft)
- Lens: 2nd order Barbier & Cie. Fresnel lens
- Range: 12 nautical miles (22 km; 14 mi)
- Characteristic: Fl W 5s.

Isla Grande is a small island and corregimiento in Portobelo District, Colón Province, Panama, off the Caribbean coast. It had a population of 1,037 as of 2010. Its population as of 1990 was 626; its population as of 2000 was 1,055. During the right times of year, the water between the island and the mainland provides an excellent surfing environment. Most of the people found in the town are of African descent and trace it back to black African slaves and those known as Cimarrones. Its historical name was Isla Grande de Bastimentos. It was discovered and named in Spanish "Isle and port of Provisions" by Christopher Columbus in 1502 during his fourth and last voyage. As the Bastimentos together with its nearby port (Puerto de Bastimentos) it played an important role in history as the place where in 1726/7 the British Admiral Francis Hosier with 3,000 of his sailors died of tropical disease whilst anchored with his fleet of 20 ships during the disastrous Blockade of Porto Bello.

== See also ==
- List of lighthouses in Panama
