= Brenda Smith (model) =

Panamanian model and beauty pageant titleholder

- Born: Brenda Andrea Smith Lezama; 25 May 1994 (age 32); Georgia, U.S.
- Height: 1.70 m (5 ft 7 in)
- Beauty pageant titleholder
- Title: Miss Missouri Teen USA 2013; Mexicana Universal Ciudad de México 2020; Miss Panamá Centro 2021; Señorita Panamá 2021
- Hair color: Black
- Eye color: Brown
- Major competitions: Miss Georgia Teen USA 2012; (2nd Runner-Up); Miss Missouri Teen USA 2013; (Winner); Miss Teen USA 2013; (Top 16); Miss Georgia USA 2017; (1st Runner-Up); Nuestra Belleza Latina 2018; (12th Place); Mexicana Universal Ciudad de México 2020; (Winner); Mexicana Universal 2020; (2nd Runner-Up); Señorita Panamá 2021; (Winner); Miss Universe 2021; (Top 16)

Brenda Andrea Smith Lezama (born 25 May 1994) is a Panamanian-American actress, journalism, model and beauty pageant titleholder who was crowned Señorita Panamá 2021. She represented Panama at the Miss Universe 2021 pageant in Eilat, Israel.

== Early life ==
Smith was born in Georgia, United States. Her father is from Panamá and her mother is Mexican. Smith received a BA in journalism from the University of Missouri.

She has appeared on several television shows, including PBS NewsHour, Dr. Drew on Call, and MSNBC Live.

In 2018, she appeared in the television series El gordo y la flaca, República Deportiva, Nuestra Belleza Latina , ¡Wake up America!, and Los Cousins. She also played a therapist in the short film "Reversion."

She played Verletta Walker in the short film "Little Stylist", which was released in the United States on June 1, 2019.

== Pageantry ==
=== Miss Georgia Teen USA 2012 ===
Smith began her beauty pageant career in 2012, entering the Miss Georgia Teen USA 2012 pageant, where she was 2nd runner-up.

=== Miss Missouri Teen USA 2013 ===
Smith entered and was crowned the 2013 Miss Missouri Teen USA pageant and was succeeded by Jayde Ogle.

=== Miss Teen USA 2013 ===
On August 10, 2013, Smith represented Missouri at the 2013 Miss Teen USA pageant at the Grand Ballroom, Atlantis Paradise Island in Nassau, Bahamas. It finished in the Top 16.

=== Miss Georgia USA 2017 ===
Smith entered and was placed 1st runner-up in the Miss Georgia USA 2017 pageant and ultimately lost to winner DeAnna Johnson of Hazlehurst.

=== Mexicana Universal 2020 ===
Smith competed as MxU Mexico City, one of the 30 finalists in her country's national beauty contest at Mexicana Universal 2020. She was ranked 2nd runner-up and lost to eventual winner Andrea Meza from Chihuahua.

=== Señorita Panamá 2021 ===
On November 7, 2021, Smith participated and represented Panama Centro in the Señorita Panamá 2021 contest at the Wyndham Convention Center Hotel in Panama City.

At the end of the event, Smith won the title of Miss Universe Panama 2021 and succeeded Carmen Jaramillo.

=== Miss Universe 2021 ===
On December 13, 2021, Smith represented Panama at the Miss Universe 2021 pageant in Eilat, Israel, and finished in the Top 16.

Awards and achievements
Preceded by Carmen Jaramillo	Señorita Panamá; 2021	Succeeded by Solaris Barba
Preceded by Aura Ávila	Miss Panama Centro; 2021	Succeeded by Incumbent
Preceded by Jayde Ogle	Miss Missouri Teen USA; 2013	Succeeded by Samantha Bowers
Preceded by Mirabai Schönburg Othon	Mexicana Universal Ciudad de México; 2020	Succeeded by Daniela Cardona Rosales
