= Carmen Jaramillo =

Panamanian model and beauty queen

- Born: Carmen Isabel Jaramillo Velarde; 26 December 1994 (age 31); La Chorrera, Panama
- Height: 1.78 m (5 ft 10 in)
- Beauty pageant titleholder
- Title: Miss Panamá Oeste 2014; Miss Earth Panamá 2015; Reina Hispanoamericana Panamá 2015; Miss Panamá Este 2019; Miss United Continents Panamá 2019; Miss Panamá 2020
- Hair color: Black
- Eye color: Brown
- Major competitions: Miss Panamá 2014 (Miss Earth Panamá 2015); Reina Hispanoamericana 2015 (Top 9); Miss Earth 2015 (Unplaced); Señorita Panamá 2019 (1st Runner-up); Miss United Continents 2019 (Top 10); Señorita Panamá 2020 (Winner); Miss Universe 2020 (Unplaced)

Carmen Isabel Jaramillo Velarde (born 26 December 1994) is a Panamanian model and beauty pageant titleholder who was crowned as Señorita Panamá 2020 and Miss Earth Panamá 2015. She represented Panama at Miss Earth 2015 but unplaced. She also represented her country at Miss Universe 2020 held on 16 May 2021.

== Pageantry ==
=== Miss Panamá 2014 ===
Carmen joined the Miss Panamá 2014 pageant where she represented the state of Panamá Oeste. She won the "Miss Panamá Latinoamerica del Mundo" title but she resigned three days after the pageant.

=== 2015: Miss Earth and Reina Hispanoamericana ===
Part of her training as Miss Earth Panama, Carmen represented Panama first at Reina Hispanoamericana 2015 in Santa Cruz, Bolivia. She competed with 23 other delegates where she was hailed as one of the Top 9 finalists. The competition was won by Sofía del Prado of Spain.

"Take care of our common cause."

— Carmen's message for Miss Earth.

=== Señorita Panamá 2019 ===
Jaramillo joined the Señorita Panamá 2019 pageant where she represented the state of Panamá Este where she finished as 1st Runner-up. She was designated to represent Panama in the Miss United Continents 2019 where she placed in the Top 10.

=== Miss Universe 2020 ===
On 9 April, the Señorita Panamá Organization announced Jaramillo as the new Señorita Panamá to represent her country at the Miss Universe 2020 pageant.

Carmen represented Panamá at the 69th Miss Universe pageant on May 16, 2021 at Seminole Hard Rock Hotel & Casino, Hollywood, Florida, United States.

Awards and achievements
Preceded by Mehr Eliezer	Miss Panama; 2020-2021	Succeeded by Brenda Smith
Preceded by María Gallimore	Miss Earth Panama; 2015	Succeeded by Virginia Hernández
Preceded by Catherine Pino	Miss Panamá Oeste; 2014–2015	Succeeded by Lissa Gutierrez
Preceded by Nohelys González	Miss Panamá Este; 2019–2020	Succeeded by Valerie Flautt
