= Solaris Barba =

Panamanian model (born 1999)

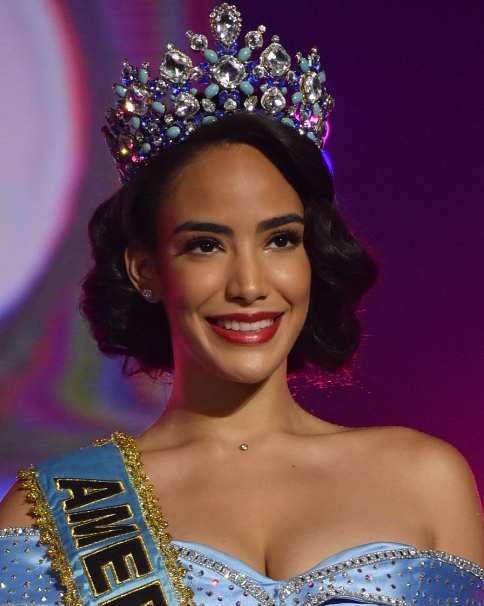
- Barba's farewell as Miss World Americas, 2019
- Born: Solaris de la Luna Barba Cañizales; March 1, 1999 (age 27); Panama City, Panama
- Height: 5 ft 10 in (1.78 m)
- Beauty pageant titleholder
- Title: Miss World Panamá 2018; Miss World Americas 2018; Miss Panamá 2022
- Major competitions: Señorita Panamá 2018 (Winner – Miss World Panamá 2018); Miss World 2018 (Top 12); (Miss World Americas); Miss Universe Panamá 2022 (Winner); Miss Universe 2022; (Unplaced)

Solaris de la Luna Barba Cañizales (born March 1, 1999) is a Panamanian model, dancer and beauty pageant titleholder who was crowned Miss Universe Panamá 2022 and represented Panama at Miss Universe 2022.

She was previously crowned as Miss World Panamá 2018 and represented Panama at the Miss World 2018 in Sanya, China, where she finished in the Top 12 and was awarded the title Miss World Americas 2018.

== Early life and education ==
Barba is from Arraiján. She graduated in 2016 from Instituto Justo Arosemena with a specialization in business, and is studying marketing and international business.

== Pageantry ==
=== Señorita Panamá 2018 ===
On June 7, 2018, Barba represented Herrera at the Señorita Panamá 2018 pageant held at the Roberto Duran Arena in Panama City, and won the title of Miss World Panama 2018 by the outgoing Julianne Brittón.

=== Miss World 2018 ===
In December 2018. she represented Panama at the Miss World 2018 competition in China in December, where she was one of the top 12 semifinalists and was awarded the title Miss World Americas 2018, the highest placement achieved by a Panamanian up to that date.

=== Miss Universe Panamá 2022 ===
On May 25, 2022, Barba was crowned Miss Universe Panamá 2022 pageant and succeeded the outgoing Señorita Panamá - Universe 2021, Brenda Smith of Panamá Centro.

=== Miss Universe 2022 ===
She represented Panama at the Miss Universe 2022 pageant, held at the New Orleans Morial Convention Center in New Orleans, Louisiana in the United States on January 14, 2023. During the national costume competition, she wore a colorful outfit entitled "Bridge of the World, Heart of the Universe", covered in beads and rhinestones, paired with a huge feathered headpiece and metallic gloves. The costume also included a giant gold heart attached to her back, which represented "her love for people who visit her home country" but was constantly slipping to the side during her performance. Ultimately, she did not make placement to the Top 16.

Awards and achievements
Preceded by Julianne Brittón	Miss World Panamá; 2018	Succeeded by Agustina Ruiz
Preceded by Leidys Murillo	Miss Herrera; 2018	Succeeded by María Cristina Saavedra
Preceded by (Mexico) Andrea Meza	Miss World Americas; 2018	Succeeded by (Brazil) Elís Miele Coelho
Preceded by Brenda Smith	Miss Universe Panamá; 2022	Succeeded by Natasha Vargas
Preceded by (United States) Elle Smith	3rd Placed Best National Costume Miss Universe; 2022	Succeeded by (El Salvador) Isabella García-Manzo
