= Señorita Panamá 2018 =

- Date: June 7, 2018
- Presenters: Massiel Rodríguez; Sheldry Sáez; Keity Drennan
- Entertainment: Las Bambitches; SomosLove; Mr. Saik
- Venue: Roberto Durán Arena, Panama City, Panama
- Broadcaster: Telemetro
- Entrants: 20
- Placements: 10
- Winner: Rosa Montezuma; Comarcas

Señorita Panamá 2018 was the 52nd Señorita Panamá pageant, held at the Roberto Durán Arena in Panama City, on June 7, 2018.

Laura de Sanctis of Contadora crowned Rosa Montezuma of Comarcas as her successor at the end of the event. Montezuma represented Panama at the Miss Universe 2018 pageant, held in Bangkok, Thailand.

== Results ==
=== Placements ===
| Placement | Contestant |
|---|---|
| Señorita Panamá 2018 | Comarcas – Rosa Iveth Montezuma |
| Señorita Panamá World 2018 | Herrera – Solaris Barba |
| Señorita Panamá International 2018 | Panamá Centro – Shirel Ortiz |
| Señorita Panamá Earth 2018 | Isla San José – Diana Lemos |
| 1st Runner-Up | Taboga – Zunilda Del Valle |
| 2nd Runner-Up | Los Santos – Andrea Batista |
| Top 10 | Chiriquí – Kiara Sang; Panamá Este – Nohelys González; Panamá Oeste – Karla Rivas; Veraguas – Selena Gómez |

=== Special awards ===
| Award | Contestant |
|---|---|
| Miss Photogenic (Miss Fotogénica) | Rosa Montezuma – (Comarcas) |
| Miss Congeniality (Miss Amistad) | Gloribeth Saavedra – (Barro Colorado) |
| Council of the Misses | Diana Lemos – (Isla San José) |
| Best Smile (Mejor Sonrisa) | Ayhemeis Henríquez – (Panamá Norte) |
| Best Skin (Mejor Piel) | Selena Gómez – (Veraguas) |
| Best Dress (Mejor Traje) | Diana Lemos – (Isla San José) |
| Best Hair (Mejor Cabellera) | Solaris Barba – (Herrera) |
| Best Proyection (Mejor Proyección) | Andrea Batista – (Los Santos) |
| Best Body (Mejor Cuerpo) | Selena Gómez – (Veraguas) |
| Miss Elegance (Miss Elegancia) | Diana Lemos – (Isla San José) |
| Miss Internet | Rosa Montezuma – (Comarcas) |
| Most Beautiful Face (Mejor Rostro) | Solaris Barba – (Herrera) |

== National Costume Selection ==
This year the contestant, was celebrated in the Viva Panamá gala on June 5, 2018. It is a competition showing the country's wealth embodied in the colorful and fascinating costumes made by Panamenian designers combining the past and present of Panama. The winner costume represent Panama in Miss Universe 2018 also chose the national costumes for Miss World 2018, Miss International 2018, Miss Earth 2018, Miss United Continents 2018, Reina Hispanoamericana 2018 & Reinado Internacional del Café 2019.

| Final results | Contest | Designer | Topic |
|---|---|---|---|
| Winner | Best National Costume to Miss Universe | Abdul Juliao | "Zaratí, el renacer de dos leyendas" |
| | Best National Costume to Miss World | Alan Barrios | "Musa Panameña" |
| | Best National Costume to Miss International | Roberto Carlos Estrella | "Aligandi" |
| | Best National Costume to Miss Earth | Samuel Villarreal | "El Martín pescador" |
| | Best National Costume to United Continents | Victor Guerrero | "Flor del Espiritu Santo" |
| | Best National Costume to Reina Hispanoamericana | Demóstenes Moreno | "El Jaguar" |
| | Best National Costume to Reinado Internacional del Café | Abraham Vergara | "Gedeco, el surgimiento de la luna" |

== Preliminary Interview ==
Held on June 6, to Señorita Panamá candidates were qualified in personal interview for the judges.

== Judges ==
- Eduardo Cano: Designer. (Panama)
- Chris Puesan: Miss Haiti President. (Dominican Republic)
- Rita Silvestre: Señorita Panamá for United Continents 2016. (Panama)
- Junior Exidio Zelaya: journalist. (Honduras)
- María Cecilia Triana de Muñoz: Professional Dancer. (Panama)
- José Miguel Guerra: Public relationist. (Panama)
- Osmel Sousa: Miss Venezuela President. (Cuba / Venezuela)
- María Alejandra Chacón: Co-founder Leotards Panama.
- Luis Ortega: Experts in Beauty Pageants. (Panama)
- Sarita Esses: social communicator. (Japan)
- Mario Augusto Perez: Architect. (Panama)
- George Wittels: Goldsmith International. (Austria / Venezuela)
- Viera Algandona: Producer and Businesswoman. (Panama)

=== Presentation Show ===
This Preliminary Competition also called The Runway of the Misses the event was held on 19 April 2018, is the night when the twenty finalists were selected from Señorita Panamá 2018 are presented to the public and press in the Swimsuit and cocktail dress categories.

== Contestants ==
These are the competitors who have been selected this year.

| Represented | Contestant | Age | Hometown |
|---|---|---|---|
| Barro Colorado | Gloribeth Saavedra | 25 | Panama City |
| Bocas del Toro | Khadine Barria | 22 | Bocas del Toro |
| Chiriquí | Kiara Sang | 22 | David |
| Chiriquí Occidente | Astrid Juarez | 23 | David |
| Coclé | Nicole Castillero | 18 | Penonome |
| Colón | Naomy Mena | 22 | Colón |
| Comarcas | Rosa Iveth Montezuma Montero | 25 | Alto Caballero |
| Contadora | Yasmeira Bennett | 19 | Colón |
| Darién | Hillary Hernandez | 23 | Panama City |
| Flamenco | Ana Gabriela Garcia | 25 | Panama City |
| Herrera | Solaris De la Luna Barba Cañizales | 19 | Panama City |
| Isla del Rey | Katherina Rios | 21 | Panama City |
| Isla San José | Diana Lemos Lee | 19 | Panama City |
| Los Santos | Andrea Valeria Batista Escudero | 23 | Las Tablas |
| Panamá Centro | Shirel Joan Ortiz Aparicio | 22 | Panama City |
| Panamá Este | Nohelys Karina González Cedeño | 22 | Panama City |
| Panamá Norte | Ayhemeis Henríquez | 20 | Panama City |
| Panamá Oeste | Karla Rivas | 23 | La Chorrera |
| Taboga | Zunilda Del Valle | 26 | Colón |
| Veraguas | Selena Gómez Santamaría | 21 | Colón |

== Historical significance ==
- Comarcas won the Señorita Panamá title for the first time.
- Herrera won the Señorita Panamá World title for the second time, last time with Marissa Burgos in 1983.
- Panamá Centro won the Señorita Panamá International title, last with Daniela Ochoa in 2016.
- Isla San José won the Señorita Panamá Earth title for the first time.
- Taboga, Los Santos, Panamá Este, Panamá Oeste placed in the top 10 last year.
- Isla San José placed for the first time.
- Chiriquí & Panamá Centro placed for the last time in (2016).
- Herrera & Veraguas placed for the last time in (2015).
- Comarcas placed for the last time in (2013).

== Election schedule ==
Señorita Panamá World & Señorita Panamá 2018

- Thursday April 19 presentation show
- Tuesday June 5, Best National Costume competition.
- Wednesday June 6, interview with the jury
- Thursday June 7 Final night, coronation Señorita Panamá 2018

== Candidates notes ==
- Ayhemeis Henríquez competed in Miss Eco International 2017 where she placed in the top 10.
- Andrea Valeria Batista was the carnival queen in Las Tablas in 2015.
- Selena Gómez competed in Miss Grand International 2016 but did not placed.
- Rosa Iveth Montezuma is the first indigenous woman to compete for the Señorita Panamá title, and won the competition.
