= David, Chiriquí =

David Ciudad de David
- City
- City of David
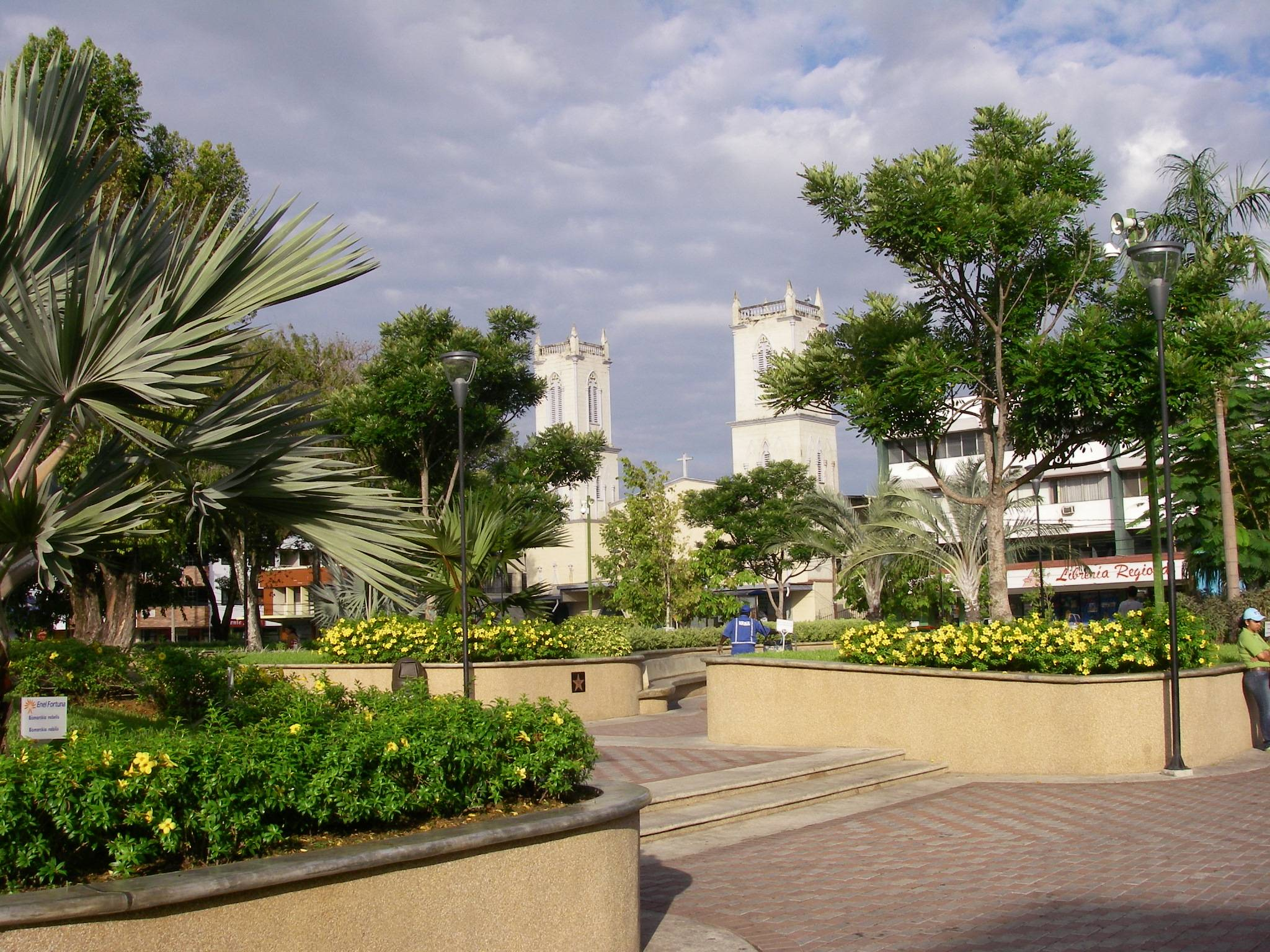
- The main town square, which features the church

- Location within Chiriquí Province Location within Panama
- Coordinates: 8°26′N 82°26′W
- Country: Panama
- Province: Chiriquí
- District: David District
- Founded: 1602
- Founder: Juan López de Sequeira

Area
  - Total: 68.3 km^{2} (26.4 sq mi)
- Elevation: 6 m (20 ft)

Population (2023)
  - Total: 76,863
  - Density: 1,130/km^{2} (2,910/sq mi)
- Demonym: Davidian
- Time zone: UTC−5 (EDT)
- Climate: Am

David (Spanish pronunciation: [da.ˈβið]), known as David City in colonial times, is a city and corregimiento in western Panama. It is the capital of the Chiriquí Province and has a population of 76,863 inhabitants as of 2023 census. It is a relatively affluent city with a firmly established, dominant middle class and a very low unemployment and poverty index. The Pan-American Highway is a popular route to David. The city is named after King David from the Bible. David is the largest city in Panama that is not part of the Panama city metro area.

The development of the banking sector, public construction works such as the expansion of the airport and the David-Boquete highway alongside the growth of commercial activity in the city have increased its prominence as one of the fastest-growing regions in the country. The city is the economic center of the Chiriqui province and produces more than half the gross domestic product of the province, which totals 2.1 billion. It is known for being the third-largest city in the country both in population and by GDP and for being the largest city in Western Panama.

== History ==
David was founded in 1602, by the governor Juan López de Siqueira. The city had been founded in the area where the Bolivar park is currently located. In those times, the city was divided into three regions, one fit for Spanish residence, and another two of lesser areas known as "San Antonio de Padra", "David" and "Nuestra Señora del Rosario". At the end of the 19th century, David had six streets, but only four were populated, making up the city center, in the sector currently known as Barrio Bolívar. The Ermita de San José (currently the San José Cathedral) was located in that area. In March 1900, the Bolívar Park was the scene of the first battle of the "Thousand Days' War", between liberals and conservatives who would later march on towards the capital to wage war against each other.

By 1726, the city was not recognized by the central government, even though intellectuals and other important people resided within the city boundaries. Juan Lopez de Sequeira is considered the main intellectual of the city and Francisco de Gama is credited as being responsible for the creation of the city. Both were converted Jewish people. It is speculated that the religious differences between them and the Royal Audience of Panama were the reason the latter refused to recognize them as such; however, in 1736, the city finally received recognition from the colonial government and was named "La Ermita San Jose de David".

From 1916 to 1949, the Chiriqui province had access and employed a railway system, having been builded under the reign of Belisario Porras to accelerate the development of the province and the exploitation of the agrarian products produced en masse by the province. The 165-kilometer-long railway system had its base of operations and main stations in the city and cemented its importance as a merchant city for the western region of Panama. Last sections of the railway network have been shut down in 1990.

According to ancient documents, the name of the city was the idea of the local natives. Also, it was the rest stop of the long trail that connected the rest of Central America with Panama City, known as the "Camino Real" or "Royal Trail".

The city's airport, Enrique Malek International Airport, previously called David Field or San Jose Field during World War II, was an auxiliary of Howard Field. It accommodated a variety of United States Army Air Forces personnel, dedicated for the most part in training and reconnaissance missions over the Southeast Pacific coastline, from Honduras in the north, to Peru in the south as part of the defense of the Panama Canal.

== Education ==
=== University ===
- Universidad Autónoma de Chiriquí
- Universidad Santa Maria La Antigua
- Universidad Tecnologica de Chiriquí
- ULACIT Chiriquí
- Columbus University

International schools:

- American School

== Commerce and industrialization ==
San José de David (official name) is Panama's third largest urban area. It functions as a hub for the province's commercial activities, mainly agriculture and cattle raising and supplies the rest of the country. It is the region's chief financial center and most national banks have offices here, including international banks such as HSBC. It also serves as a port of exports and imports with neighboring Costa Rica. It is connected to the rest of the country by the Pan-American Highway, and the Enrique Malek International Airport. David is one of the most industrialized cities in the country and is a center of manufacturing, heavy industry and high technology standards and communications. It is also a popular tourist destination due to its nightlife, entertainment, cuisine, shopping and relative proximity to the Pacific coast and the Panamanian highlands.

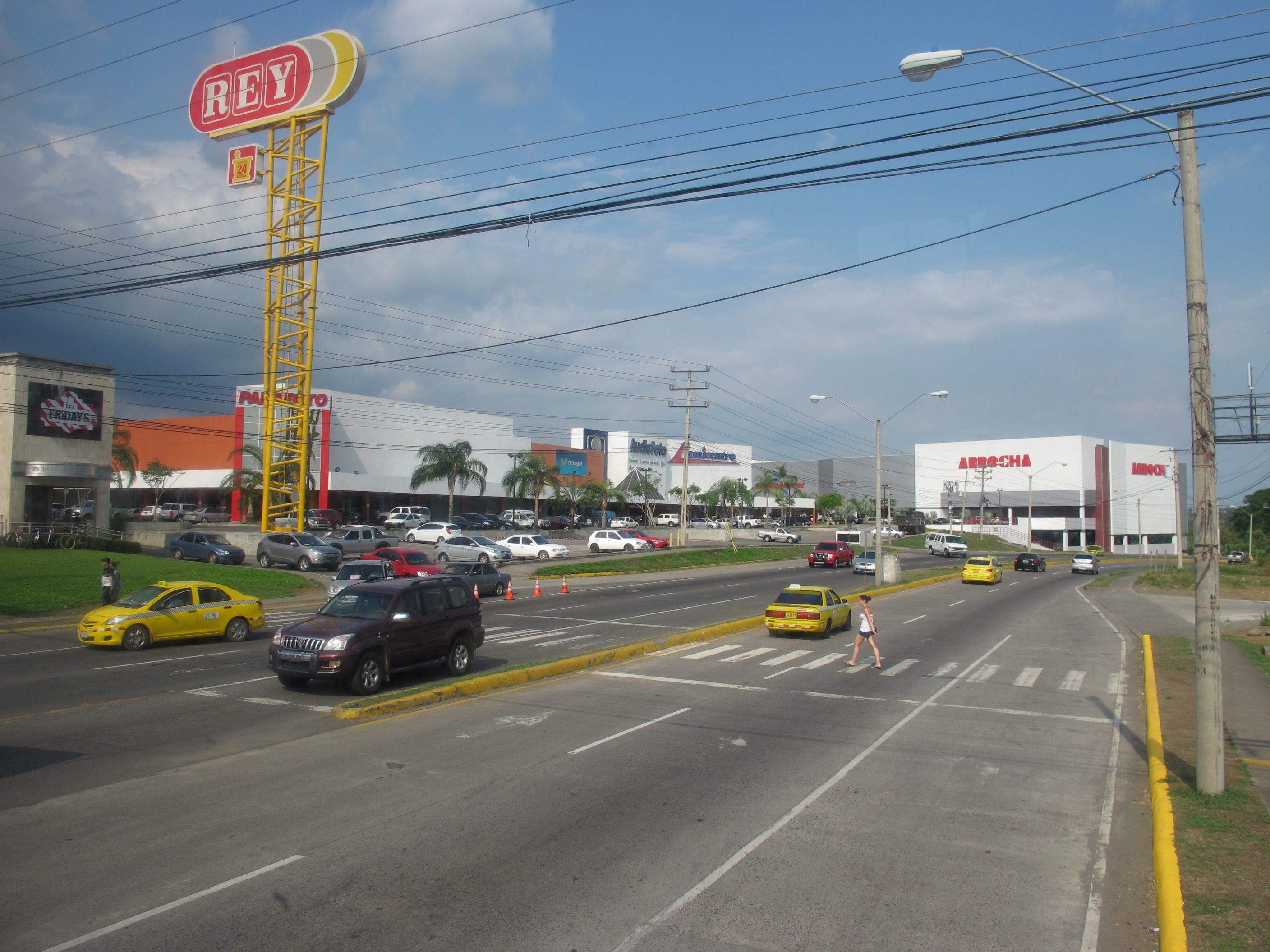
Carretera Panamericana - David

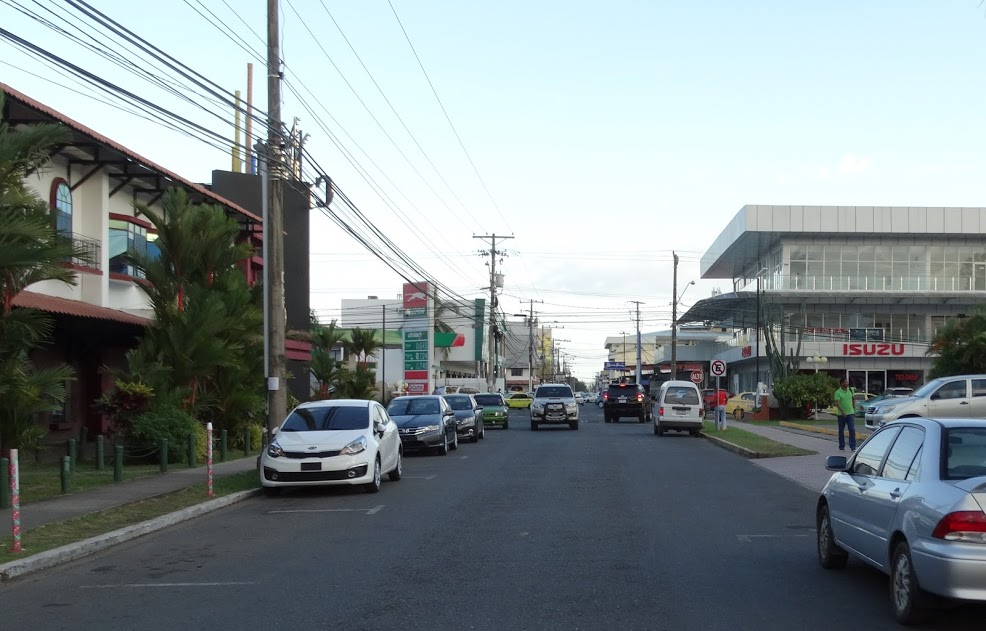
David street view

== Location and geography ==
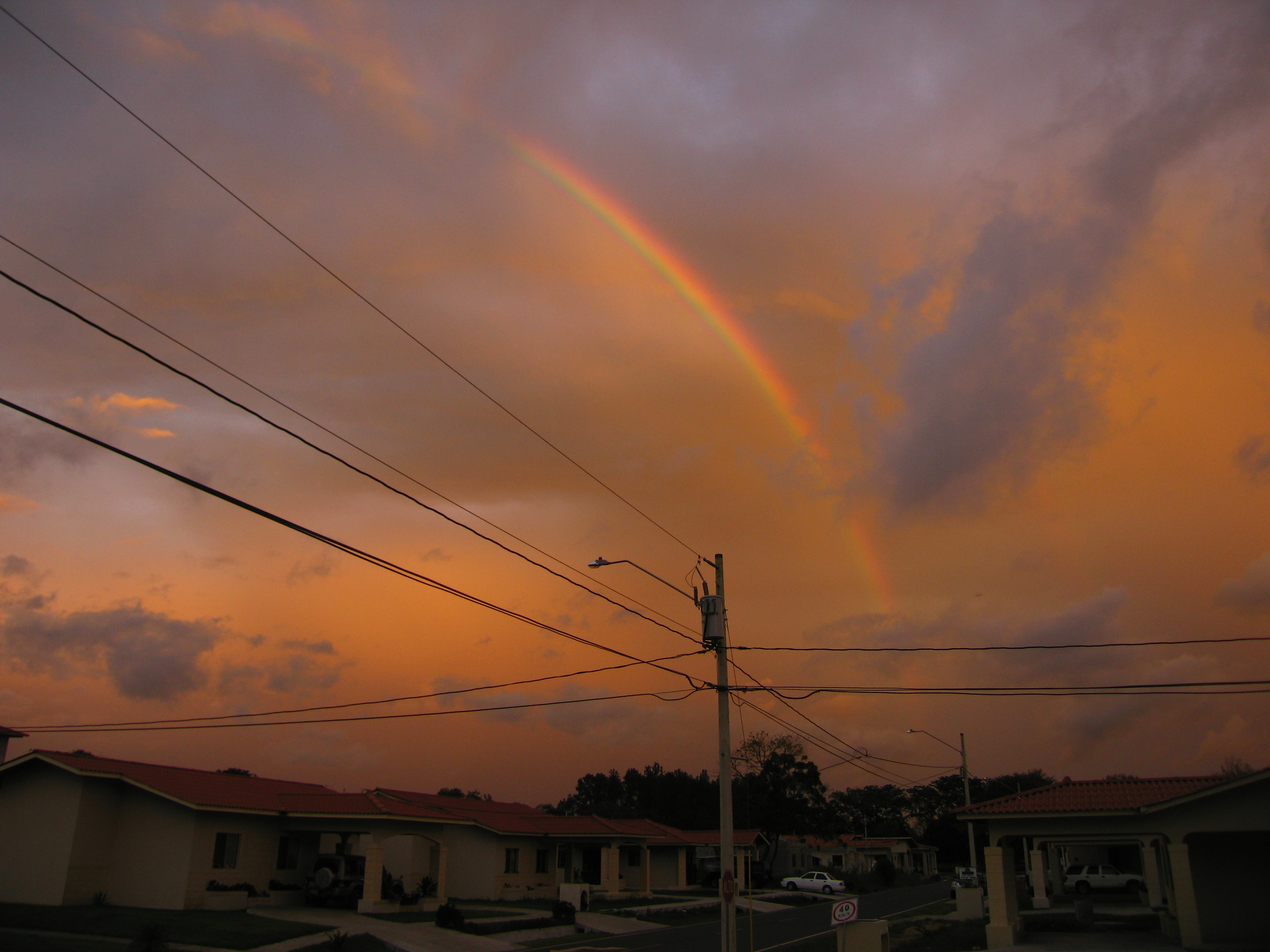
Residential district in David.

David is located in a basin in south central Chiriquí Province between the cities of Puerto Armuelles on the coast and Boquete in the mountains. The city lies below the water break on the David River, at the foothills of the Cordillera de Talamanca mountain range. Volcán Barú, a potentially active volcano and also the tallest mountain in Panama, is visible from northern parts of the city. David is roughly 30 kilometres (19 mi) from the Costa Rican border and is a vital center for trade between the two countries, located some 434 kilometres or 270 miles from Panama City.

The city has little geographic variations within its boundaries. The main geographic landmarks in David are “Cerro San Cristobal” and “Cerro Pedregal”, located in the southern area of the city, in the Pedregal area. Mounts “Cerro Santa Cruz” and the “Pico de Loro” (literally: “Parrot’s Peak”) Sierra surround the north of David, being located in the San Carlos Area.

David's northeast region is surrounded by the Manjagua and David rivers, dividing David from the residential “Las Lomas” area. There are also smaller rivers running in a southernly direction and feeding the Pedregal estuary, which surrounds Pedregal and reaches its delta near the grounds of the Enrique Malek International Airport.

The ocean coast close to David is in part covered by extensive beaches and mangroves. The city's main port, Pedregal, is located in the south end of the city, near the mangrove-filled region. The port is closely connected by land to the city's airport. This port is the docking site for small private vessels and yachts owned by David's residents, and also serves as an attraction for fishers. It is also the departing place for tours that go to the numerous islands of the Chiriquí Gulf and the base of operations of many handicraft vendors.

The city is the seat of the Roman Catholic Diocese of David.

=== Climate ===
The city has one of the hottest climates in the Central American region, but the temperatures drop sharply near the outskirts. David's climate is classified as a tropical monsoon climate (Köppen Am) with a short, sweltering, dry season from mid-December to mid-April and a long, oppressive and hot wet season from mid-April to mid-December.

Climate data for David, Chiriquí
Month	Jan	Feb	Mar	Apr	May	Jun	Jul	Aug	Sep	Oct	Nov	Dec	Year
Mean daily maximum °C (°F)	32.2 (90.0)	33.3 (91.9)	33.9 (93.0)	33.3 (91.9)	31.7 (89.1)	31.1 (88.0)	30.6 (87.1)	30.6 (87.1)	30.6 (87.1)	30.0 (86.0)	30.0 (86.0)	31.1 (88.0)	31.5 (88.7)
Mean daily minimum °C (°F)	21.7 (71.1)	22.2 (72.0)	22.8 (73.0)	23.3 (73.9)	23.3 (73.9)	23.3 (73.9)	23.3 (73.9)	22.8 (73.0)	22.8 (73.0)	22.8 (73.0)	22.8 (73.0)	22.2 (72.0)	22.8 (73.0)
Average rainfall mm (inches)	33.3 (1.31)	19.3 (0.76)	35.5 (1.40)	102.5 (4.04)	297.0 (11.69)	322.6 (12.70)	289.8 (11.41)	340.3 (13.40)	406.6 (16.01)	400.5 (15.77)	295.4 (11.63)	77.4 (3.05)	2,620.2 (103.17)
Average relative humidity (%)	67.7	62.6	62.4	69.6	79.5	81.1	80.4	81.1	82.1	83.8	82.8	75.5	75.7
Mean monthly sunshine hours	275.5	262.0	270.5	216.2	160.4	128.3	141.1	148.6	135.4	139.5	154.5	218.7	2,250.7
Mean daily daylight hours	11.7	11.9	12.1	12.3	12.5	12.6	12.6	12.4	12.2	11.9	11.7	11.6	12.1
Percentage possible sunshine	76	78	72	59	41	34	36	39	37	38	44	61	51
Source 1: World Meteorological Organisation (UN) (30 yr record),
Source 2: ETESA (humidity and sun values) Weather Spark

== Layout ==
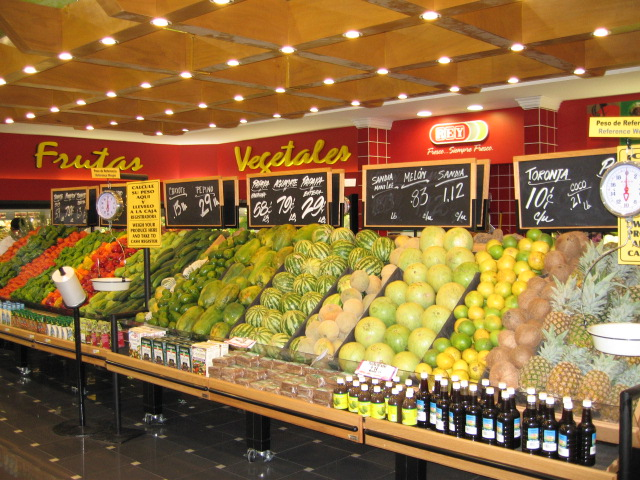
A grocery store in David

Central David is mostly laid out in a grid with numbered streets; however, the streets on the outskirts of town are neither named nor numbered. David's population density is rather low, as most people live in detached single-family homes. Most buildings in town, including those in the central business district, are only one or two stories high. Only a few hotels, banks, casinos, and apartment buildings reach a height of two to five stories.

Most expatriates and the wealthiest residents live in the northern section of the city and in the neighboring communities immediately to the north and northwest. This area is also a commercial district and contains many franchises, stores and outlets.

David offers many lodging options. As Chiriquí province continues to gain popularity as a tourist destination, more hotels are being built to accommodate all budget ranges. Hotels in the city present the visitor with a wide variety of amenities and variety of prices. The hotels are located in the city center, near the banking and business district so they have the most central location of the city. Many backpackers and budget travelers have recently discovered David. There are two main backpacker hostels: Bambu Hostel and Purple House. The area is also home to the Miguel de Cervantes Saavedra Park. The central location makes the base from which Chiriqui's main chains and companies operate and serves as the headquarters and banking center of many banks in the province.

The Miguel de Cervantes Saavedra Park is located in the middle of the city. This new park works as a rest stop for visitors and locals traversing the city. It is known for offering shade from the city's usual sunny weather under its trees. It is the place of business for some ice cream, handicraft and lottery vendors, and is surrounded by banks, hotels and many shops.

== Notable residents ==
- Franklin Archibold - cyclist
- Gonzalo Brenes - composer, musicologist, politician, and music educator
- Rebeca Espinosa - footballer
- Yelko Gómez - cyclist
- Schiandra González - footballer
- José Luis Lacunza Maestrojuán - Bishop of David 1999-2024, Cardinal of Panama since 2015
- Rosa Montezuma - fashion model and Señorita Panamá 2018
- José Raúl Mulino - 39th President of Panama since 2024
- Carlos Ruiz - baseball player, Philadelphia Phillies
