= List of cities in Panama =

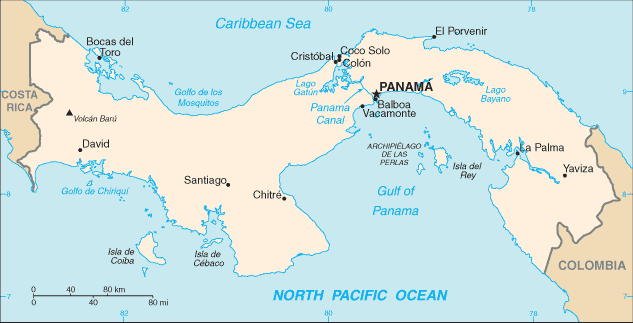
A map of Panama

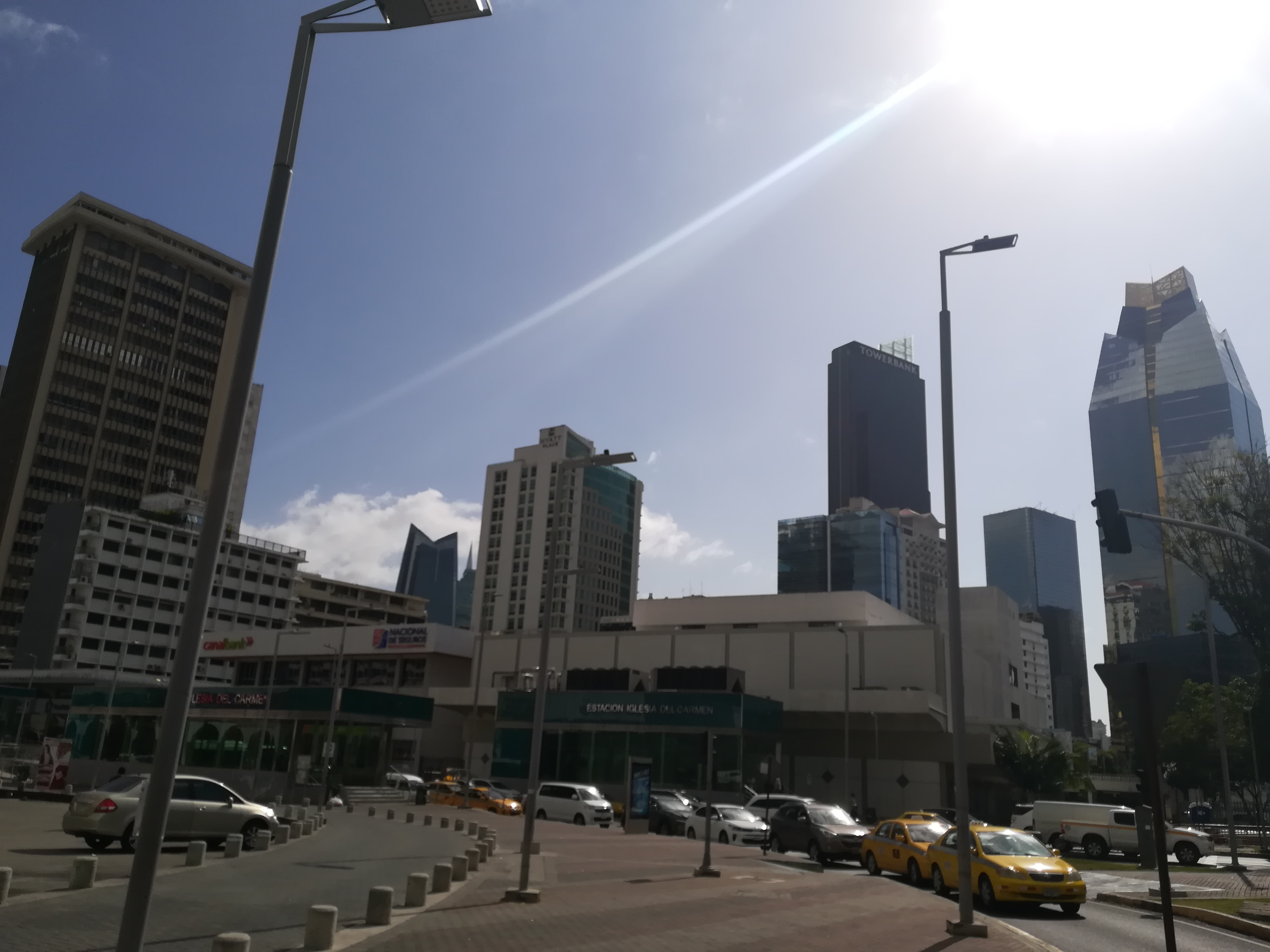
Panama City, Panama's capital city.

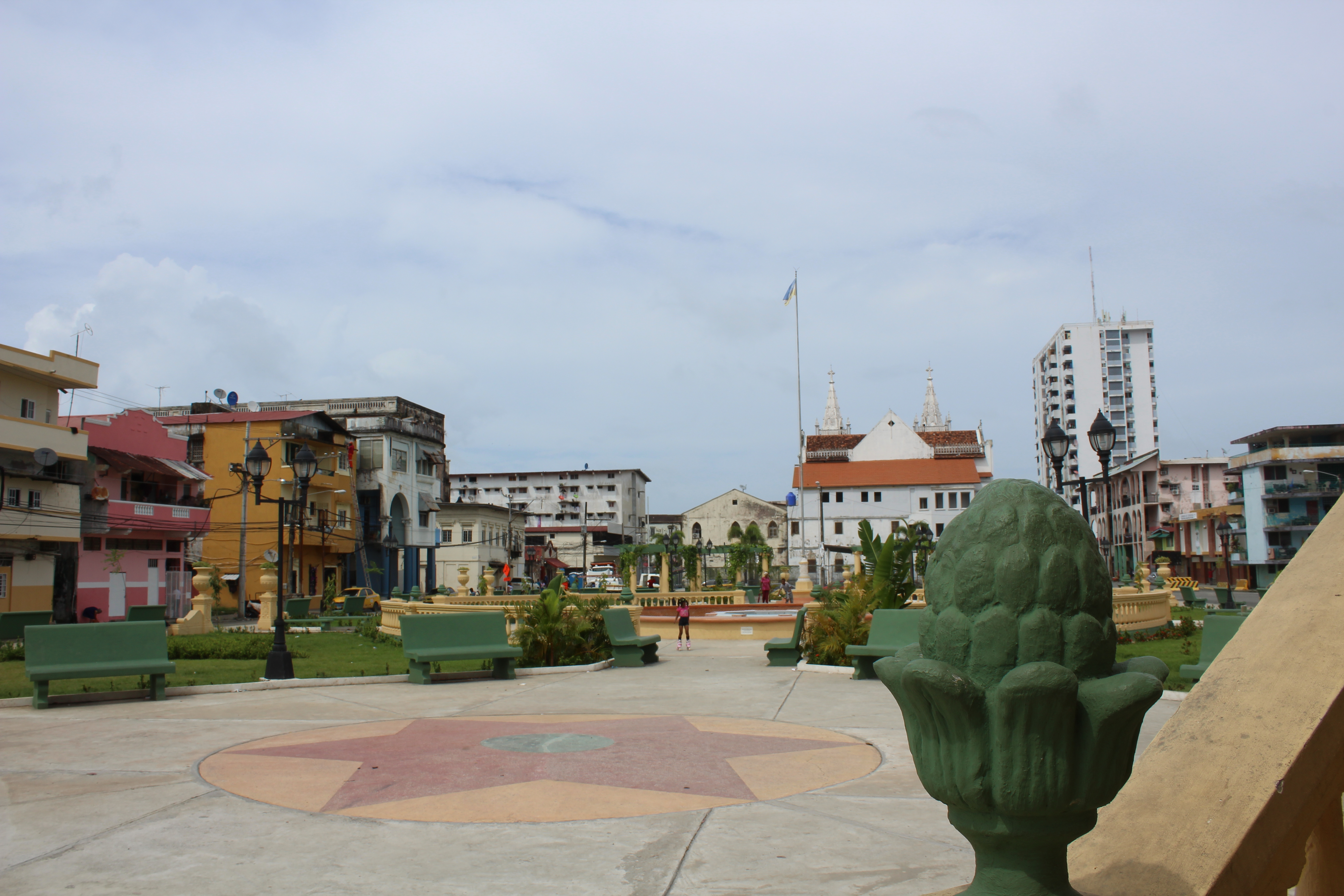
Colón City, capital of the Colón province.

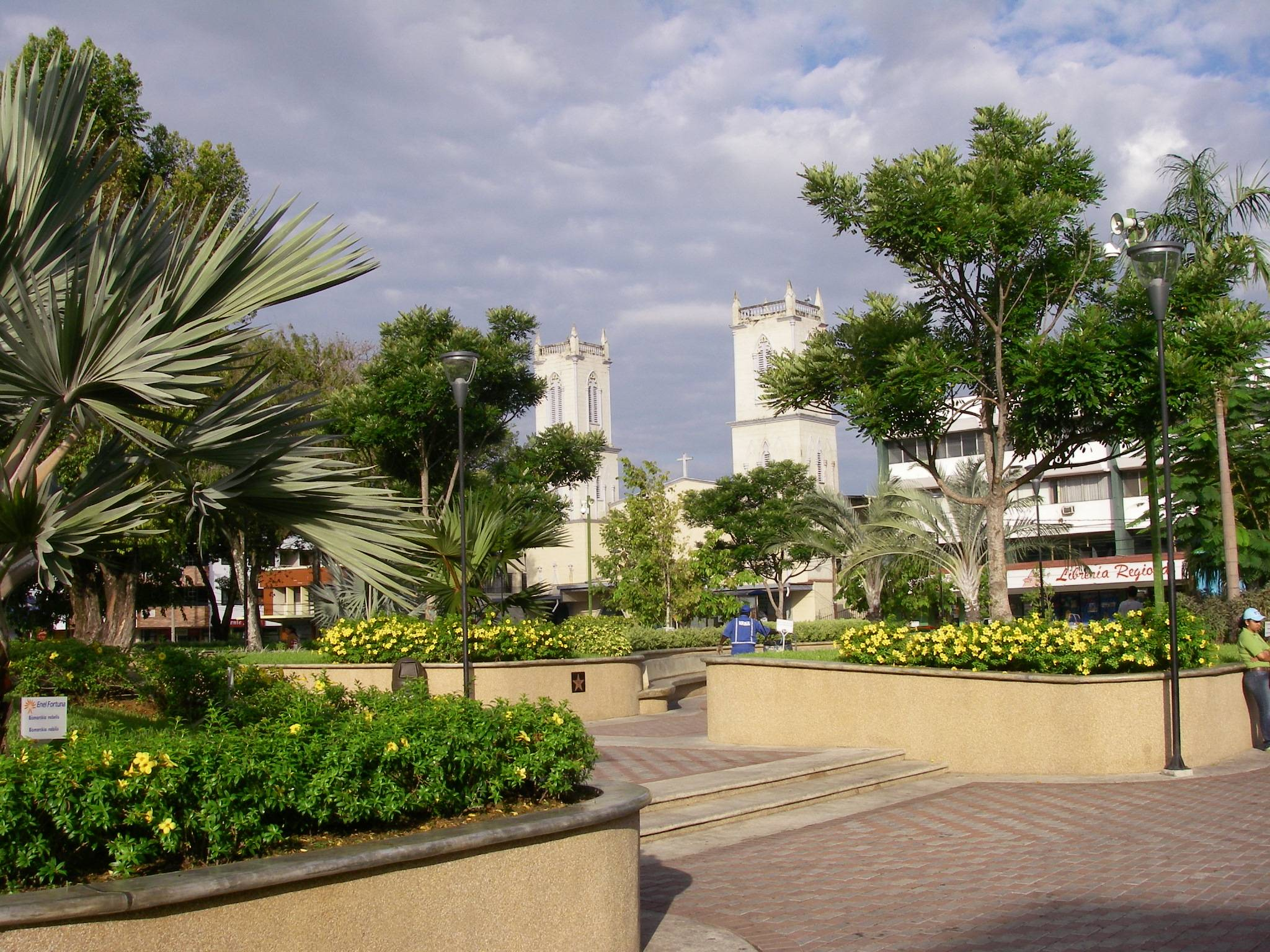
David, capital of the Chiriquí province.

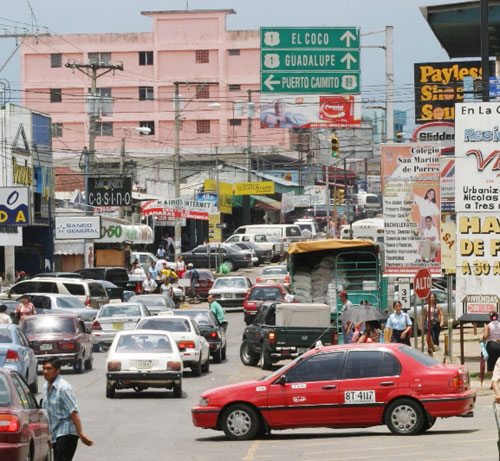
La Chorrera, capital of the Panamá Oeste province.

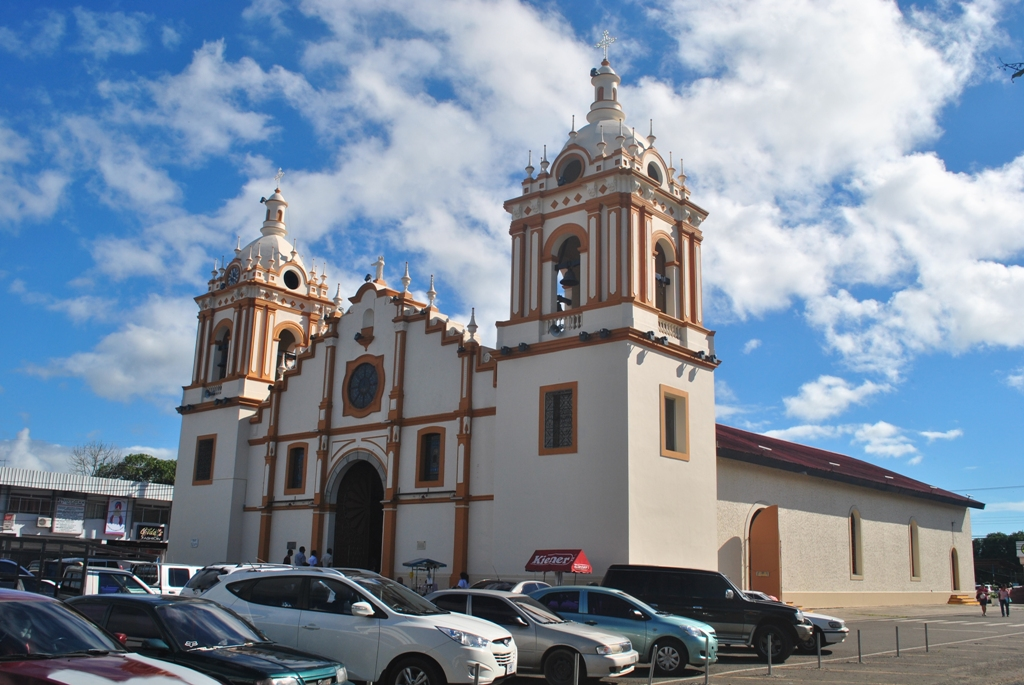
Santiago, capital of the Veraguas province.

This is a list of cities in Panama.

== Largest cities ==
=== By city proper ===
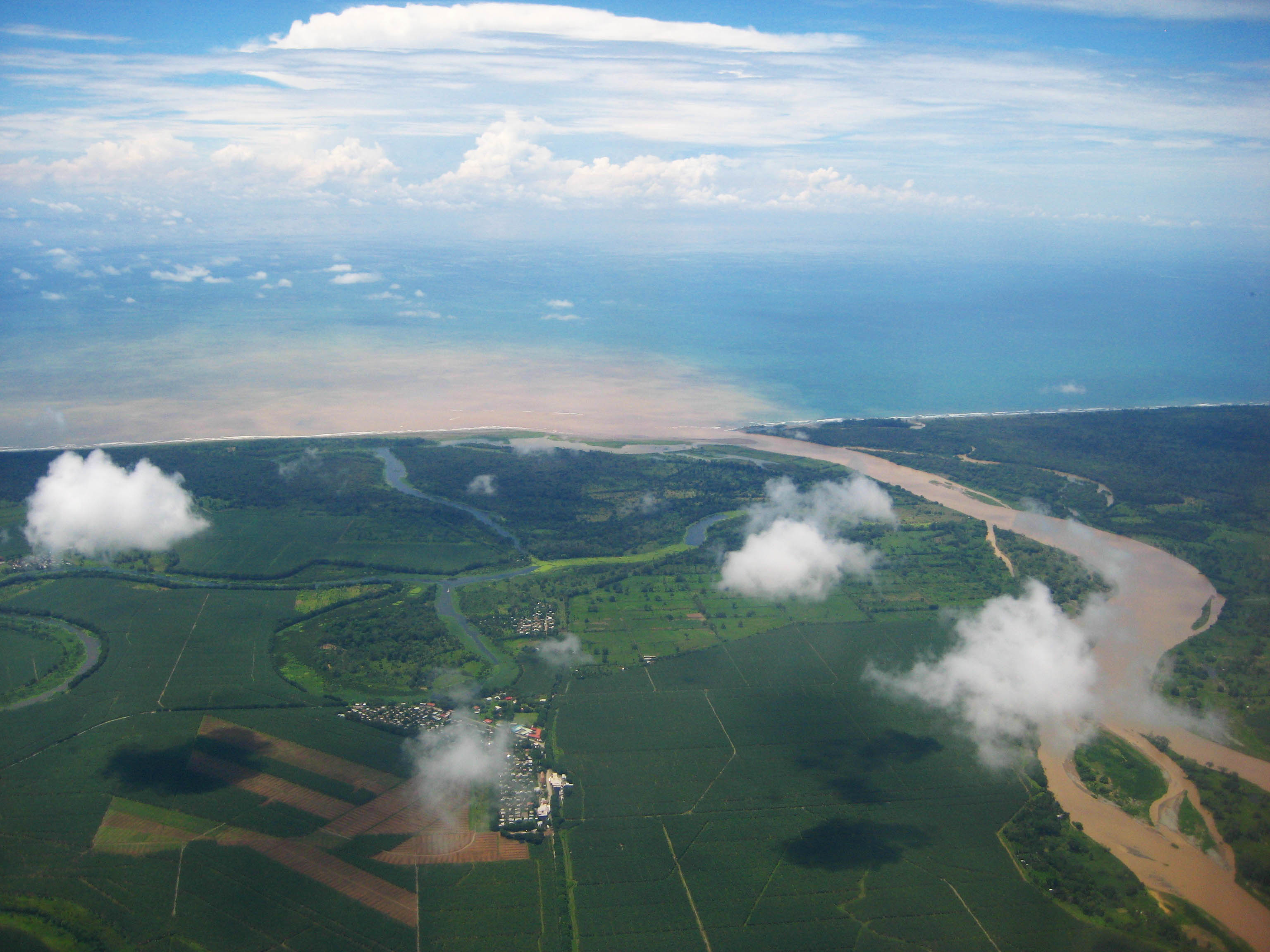
Changuinola, the most populated city of Bocas del Toro.

#	City proper	Population (2023)	Province
1	**Panama City**	410,354	Panamá
2	San Miguelito	280,777	Panamá
3	**La Chorrera**	65,438	Panamá Oeste
4	Arraiján	44,327	Panamá Oeste
5	Chepo	34,425	Panamá
6	**Penonomé**	25,836	Coclé
7	**Santiago**	23,236	Veraguas
8	La Concepción	21,280	Chiriquí
9	**Colón**	18,783	Colón
10	**David**	16,051	Chiriquí

=== By district ===
These are the largest 20 Panamanian cities and towns, listed in descending order. All figures are estimates for corresponding districts for the year 2016. The last census took place in 2010. Provincial capitals are shown in bold.

Nº	District	Population (2016)	Province
1	**Panamá**	1,756,781	Panamá
2	**Colón**	241,817	Colón
3	**David**	193,350	Chiriquí
4	**La Chorrera**	190,093	Panamá Oeste
5	**Santiago**	98,431	Veraguas
6	Changuinola	98,334	Bocas del Toro
7	**Penonomé**	92,766	Coclé
8	Bugaba	82,930	Chiriquí
9	Puerto Armuelles	58,093	Chiriquí
10	Antón	56,485	Coclé
11	Chepo	56,396	Panamá
12	**Chitré**	55,988	Herrera
13	Aguadulce	50,478	Coclé
14	Capira	45,255	Panamá Oeste
15	Chame	29,746	Panamá Oeste
16	Soná	29,586	Veraguas
17	Almirante	29,539	Bocas del Toro
18	La Pintada	29,535	Coclé
19	**Las Tablas**	29,297	Los Santos
20	La Villa de Los Santos	27,300	Los Santos

== Alphabetical list ==
- Achutupo
- Ailigandí
- Alanje
- Alcalde Díaz
- Almirante
- Alto de la Estancia
- Alto del Espino
- Agua Buena
- Aguadulce, Coclé
- Ancón
- Antón
- Arraiján
- Aserrío de Gariché
- Atalaya
- Berbá
- Bisira
- Boca de Parita
- Bocas Town
- Boquerón
- Boquete
- Bugaba
- Burica
- Bágala
- Caimitillo
- Calobre
- Calzada Larga
- Canoa
- Capellanía
- Capetí
- Capira
- Cartí Sugtupu
- Cativá
- Cañazas
- Celmira
- Cermeño
- Cerro Cama
- Cerro Punta
- Chame
- Changuinola
- Chepo
- Chichica
- Chigoré
- Chiguirí Arriba
- Chilibre
- Chimán
- Chiriquí Grande
- Chitré
- Churuquita Chiquita
- Churuquita Grande
- Cirilo Guainora
- Coetupo
- Colón
- Coloncito
- Cristóbal
- David
- Divalá
- Dolega
- El Caño
- El Copé
- El Cortezo
- El Cortezo
- El Cristo
- El Cristo
- El Espavé
- El Espino de Santa Rosa
- El Giral
- El Porvenir
- El Real de Santa María
- El Rincón
- El Roble
- El Silencio
- El Uvito
- El Valle de la Unión
- Entradero
- Escobal
- Finca Blanco
- Finca Cincuenta y Uno
- Finca Corredor
- Garachiné
- Gariché
- Guabito
- Gualaca
- Guararé
- Guarumal
- Guarumal
- Horconcitos
- Icantí
- Ipetí
- Jaqué
- Kanir-Dup
- Kankintú
- Kusapin
- La Cabima
- La Chorrera
- La Concepcion
- La Espigadilla
- La Loma
- La Mata
- La Mitra
- La Palma
- La Raya de Santa María
- La Tiza
- Las Cumbres
- Las Guías Oriente
- Las Minas
- Las Tablas
- Llano Largo
- Llano Marín
- Llano de Piedra
- Los Algarrobos
- Los Anastacios
- Los Boquerones
- Los Lotes
- Los Pollos
- Los Pozos
- Lídice
- Macaracas
- Mamitipo
- María Chiquita
- Mata del Nance
- Metetí
- Monte Lirio
- Mortí
- Mulatupo
- Nata
- Nombre de Dios
- Nueva Gorgona
- Nuevo Arraiján
- Nuevo Emperador
- Nuevo Guararé
- Nuevo San Juan
- Nuevo Vigía
- Ocú
- Olá
- Pacora
- Palmas Bellas
- Panama City – capital
- Parita
- Paso Blanco
- Pedasí
- Pedregal
- Pedregal
- Pedregal
- Penonomé
- Pesé
- Plaza de Caisán
- Pocrí (Coclé)
- Pocrí (Los Santos)
- Portobello
- Potrerillos Abajo
- Potrerillos Arriba
- Potrero Grande
- Puerto Armuelles
- Puerto Caimito
- Puerto Indio
- Puerto Pilón
- Punta Peña
- Quebrada Bonita Adentro
- Río Alejandro
- Río Duque
- Río Hato
- Río Rita
- Río Sereno
- Río de Jesús
- Sabanitas
- Sajalices
- San Miguelito
- San Vicente de Bique
- Santa Ana Arriba
- Santa Fé
- Santa Rita Arriba
- Santiago de Veraguas
- Sasardi
- Sioguí Abajo
- Sioguí Arriba
- Sortová
- Tocumen
- Tolé
- Tonosí
- Tubualá
- Unión Chocó
- Ustupo
- Vacamonte
- Valle del Risco
- Villa Carmen
- Villa Rosario
- Volcán
- Yaviza

== See also ==
- Lists of cities in Central America
