= Espino =

Espino may refer to:

== Plants ==
- Crataegus monogyna, native to Europe, Africa and Asia
- Acacia caven, native to mainland South America

== People ==
- Alfredo Espino (1900—1928), El Salvadoran poet
- Amado Espino, Jr., Governor of the Philippine Province of Pangasinan
- Benito Espinós (1748–1818), Spanish painter
- Damaso Espino (born 1983), Panamanian baseball player
- Daniel Espino (born 2001), Panamanian baseball player
- Dennis Espino (born 1973), Filipino basketball player
- Gaby Espino (born 1977), Venezuelan actress and model
- Héctor Espino (1939–1997), Mexican baseball player
- Juan Espino (born 1956), Dominican baseball player
- Karel Espino (born 2001), Cuban professional footballer
- Martin Espino, Mexican-American musician and composer
- Miguel Angel Espino (1902–1967), El Salvadoran writer, journalist and lawyer
- Miguel Espino (born 1980), American boxer
- Nelson Moliné Espino, Cuban dissident and prisoner of conscience
- Paolo Espino (born 1987), Panamanian baseball player

== Municipalities and places ==
- Alto del Espino, a town in the Panamá province of Panama
- El Espino, Spain, a village in the municipality of Suellacabras, Soria province, Spain
- El Espino, Boyacá, a municipality in the Colombian Department of Boyacá
- El Espino de Santa Rosa, a town in the Veraguas province of Panama
- Espino de la Orbada, a village and municipality in the province of Salamanca, western Spain
- Hoyos del Espino, a municipality located in the province of Ávila, Castile and León, Spain
- Espino, Añasco, Puerto Rico, a barrio
- Espino, Lares, Puerto Rico, a barrio
- Espino, Las Marías, Puerto Rico, a barrio
- Espino, San Lorenzo, Puerto Rico, a barrio

== Stadiums ==
- Estadio Cerro del Espino, a multi-use stadium located in Majadahonda, Community of Madrid, Spain
- Estadio de Béisbol Héctor Espino, a baseball stadium in Hermosillo, Mexico named for Héctor Espino

== See also ==
- Espinillo (disambiguation)
- El Espino (disambiguation)
