= Coloncito =

Coloncito may refer to:

- Coloncito, Panama
- Coloncito, Táchira
