= El Cortezo =

El Cortezo may refer to:

- El Cortezo, Coclé
- El Cortezo, Los Santos
