= Maisonave =

Maisonave is a surname. Notable people with the surname include:

- Héctor Maisonave (1930–2022), American music entrepreneur and talent manager
- Wilfredo Maisonave (born 1951), Puerto Rican long jumper
