= Pollo =

Pollo may refer to:

- chicken in Spanish and Italian languages
- pollo, or polo, is a rice dish in the Persian language

== People ==
- Secondo Pollo (1908-1941), Italian priest
- Stefanaq Pollo (1924-1977), Albanian academic
- Genc Pollo (born 1963), Albanian politician
- Pollo (footballer) (born 1983), Spanish footballer
- Pollo (gamer) (born 2008), professional Fortnite player
- Pollo Del Mar, American drag queen
- Pollo (band), Brazilian rap group

== Places ==
- Pollos, municipality in Spain
- Los Pollos, town in Panama

== See also ==
- List of chicken restaurants
- List of chicken dishes
