= Tronosa =

Tronosa may refer to:

- Tronoša Monastery
- La Tronosa, Panama

== See also ==
- Tronoša Chronicle
