= Panamane =

Constructed language by Manuel E. Amador

- L'universele lingu Panamane
- Created by: Manuel E. Amador
- Date: 1922
- Purpose: Constructed language: Universal language; A posteriori language; Panamane
- Writing system: Latin script (Panamane alphabet)
- Sources: European languages, mostly from Spanish, French, English and German, including expressions from Panamanian Spanish.

Language codes
- ISO 639-3: –
- Glottolog: None
- IETF: none

Panamane [panaˈman] is a constructed language created by the Panamanian Manuel E. Amador in 1922 and compiled in a book titled Fundaments of Panamane: Universal Language in 1936.

== History ==
During the 1900s, Manuel E. Amador, son of the first president of Panama, Manuel Amador Guerrero, moved to New York to serve as Panama's consul in the city. Later, during the 1910s, he developed an interest in music and linguistics, alongside his existing artistic pursuits. During this time, he learned the international language Esperanto and became an Esperantist, though he later abandoned the movement in 1922 after attending a meeting of the Esperanto club in Greenwich Village, New York, where he questioned the lack of success of Esperanto.

Upon returning home, Amador read "The Gettysburg Address" by Abraham Lincoln multiple times and, deeply moved, he wrote a translation in what he called the "language of languages." This text became the prototype of his own constructed language, which he named "Panamane" in honor of his country. After six years of development, he completed two manuscripts outlining his language, one in English and the other in Spanish. However, the actual publication of the language did not materialize until 1936, thanks to the efforts of Amador and his wife.

Despite Amador's efforts, Panamane did not gain much prominence during the first thirty years after its publication, remaining overshadowed by its predecessors and successors, including Esperanto. In his work on the subject, Paulo Rónai points out that more than a planned language, Panamane represents an "endless quest"; a utopia that aspires not only to be an auxiliary language, but a genuine universal language that surpasses and supplants all previous ones. Rodrigo Miró, on the other hand, adds that the project reflects Amador's "unbalanced yet amiable intimacy," showcasing not only his skill as a linguist but also as an artist.

== Language description ==
=== Phonology ===
Panamane has 22 consonants and 6 vowels. The vowels maintain their full sound and do not become semivowels. The letter "y" before a vowel allows the semivocal sound [j], forming diphthongs in the process.

In Panamane, most words are stressed on the second-to-last syllable (paroxytone). However, there are exceptions when the letter "h" is used as a suffix to mark the stress on a different syllable, making it either oxytone or proparoxytone. Additionally, the presence of the digraphs "ff" and "ss" at the end of a word indicates the acute accent.

Furthermore, certain suffixes like the adverbial suffix "-aam" are not counted as part of the syllables when determining the stress placement. Instead, it allows the word to carry both primary and secondary stress.

The consonantal phonemes of Panamane are as follows:

	Labial	Dental	Alveolar	Palato-alveolar	Velar	Uvular	Glottal
Stop	p b		t d			k g	
Nasal	m		n	ɲ			
Affricate				t͡ʃ dʒ			
Fricative	f	θ	s z	ʃ ʒ			h
Approximant			l ɫ		j	w	

Regarding the vowels, the following phonemes are found in Panamane:

	Front	Back
Close	i	u
Near-close	e ø	o
Open	a	

=== Alphabet ===
Panamane has 26 letters: a, b, c, d, e, f, g, h, i, j, k, l, m, n, o, p, q, r, s, t, u, v, w, x, y, z. However, only 23 of these letters are used, excluding the letters c, q, and v.

The pronunciation of /e/ varies as follows:

a) It is silent at the end of a word when preceded by a consonant (except "y"): panamane, othore
b) It is pronounced as [e] at the end of a word when preceded by a vowel: paskae, soe
c) In all other cases, it is pronounced as [e]: befrénder, efuso

The pronunciation of /h/ varies as follows:

a) It is silent at the beginning of some words of Romance origin: hombel, hugos
b) When it appears in the antepenultimate syllable of a word, preceded by a vowel and followed by a consonant, it remains silent and marks the accent proparoxytone: dihjiti, Amehrika
c) In all other cases, it is pronounced as [h]: hoindy, hund

The pronunciation of /y/ varies as follows:

a) It is pronounced as [eː] at the end of a word: dinaunsy, Edimburgensy
b) In all other cases, it is pronounced as [j]: ayotimene, esya

==== Digraphs ====
In Panamane, the following digraphs are used:

- /ch/: Represents the sound [tʃ], except in certain words of Greek origin where it is pronounced as [k].
- /eu/: Pronounced as [ø].
- /jn/: Pronounced as [ɲ].
- /ll/ at the end of a word: Pronounced as [ɫ].
- /ph/: Pronounced as [f].
- /sh/: Pronounced as [ʃ].
- /th/: Pronounced as [θ].

Additionally, when /ye/ appears in the last syllable of a word, either as itself or forming /ye/, its hypothetical pronunciation [je] is simplified to [eː]: barbárye, barbáryen.

Furthermore, duplicate letters in a word, unless they form digraphs in context, have specific functions:

- Consonants: Double consonants like /mm/ correspond to [m.m], representing a double sound.
- Vowels: Double vowels like /aa/, /ee/, and /uu/ correspond to [a:], [e:], and [u:], respectively, indicating a long vowel sound.

=== Syntax ===
Panamane draws heavily from English, providing the essential structure and many of its idiosyncrasies. Examples include the two forms of forming comparatives and superlatives, the parallel use of you and thou, idioms like Oh mother of mine! (which becomes Oh máder da máin!), and the use of the negation verb with the apostrophe, transforming the phrase I shouldn’t have into I súdo’n aber.

In the pursuit of flexibility, elegance, and character, certain decisions were made to enrich the language. For instance, in addition to the two possessive forms present in English (the work of my father and my father's work), Panamane also adopted the German genitive, allowing for three different ways to say the phrase without any change in meaning:

- le óppu da mái pader
- mái páderes óppu
- le óppu máines páderes

Similarly, Panamane closely mirrors the highly compound tenses of the English conjugation system. For example:

- English: I oughtn't have been teaching
- Panamane: I ótto'n ab séro teshéndo.

Additionally, the adverb there with its two meanings, indeterminate and determinate, is faithfully replicated:

- English: There are many birds there.
- Panamane: Der sont multi sossy dáe.

Following English biases, derivations in Panamane also resemble English patterns:

- English: A whitehaired lady
- Panamane: Un biankuhaárud damy
- English: A wagonful of garbage
- Panamane: Un vagone-funda da garbo

From the Romance languages, Amador borrowed the "false reflexive" (as in constructions like yo me voy), the absolute superlative ending in -ísimo, and the "paradoxical superlative." Additionally, from French, the redundant negative adverb pas was incorporated into Panamane.
