= Barrio Colón =

- Corregimiento
- Country: Panama
- Province: Panamá Oeste
- District: La Chorrera

Area
  - Land: 14.7 km^{2} (5.7 sq mi)

Population (2010)
  - Total: 33,214
  - Density: 2,254/km^{2} (5,840/sq mi)
- Population density calculated based on land area.
- Time zone: UTC−5 (EST)

Barrio Colón is a corregimiento within the city of La Chorrera, in La Chorrera District, Panamá Oeste Province, Panama with a population of 33,214 as of 2010. Its population as of 1990 was 20,746; its population as of 2000 was 26,818.
