= El Coco, Panamá Oeste =

El Coco
- Corregimiento
- Location in La Chorrera District

- Location within Panama
- Coordinates: 8.8834°N 79.8332°W
- Country: Panama
- Province: Panamá Oeste
- District: La Chorrera

Area
  - Land: 13.9 km^{2} (5.4 sq mi)

Population (2010)
  - Total: 19,603
  - Density: 1,410/km^{2} (3,650/sq mi)
- Time zone: UTC−5 (EST)

El Coco is a township (corregimiento) located in Panama Oeste Province, Republic of Panama, and is part of the populous district of La Chorrera. It had a population of 19,603 inhabitants as of 2010 and is part of the metropolitan area of Panama City.

== Creation ==
In 1909 for management promoted by Mayor Baldomero Gonzalez, by Decision No 11 of 14 November 1909 and was president of the Municipal Council Jose De La Rosa Veces was founded nine townships, one of which was El Coco y La Laguna, then composed by Potrero Grande, La Doradilla, El Coco (seat), El Espino, Cerro Negro and El Guayabo.

In 1927, by resolution No. 10 of June 2 were established 12 districts, and appears a second time El Coco with the same name with a correction in their council areas as well: La Doradilla, Perdiz, La Laguna, Cerro Negro, Potrero Grande, Raudal and Aguacate.

== Name ==
According to indicate the name of the jurisdiction stems from the abundance of coconut trees that were in the area. Others on the other hand indicate that in the early formation of this district there were many Indians who were called "coconut" as a synonym for "Cholo".

== History ==
This jurisdiction experienced an accelerated expansion during the past decade, mainly due to the action of people who occupied through informal processes and self, areas of the west to Loma Acosta. However, with the new direction of development to the east, is projected slower development in El Coco, with the addition of new areas of low density.

== Demographics ==
In the 2010 census, El Coco recorded a population of 19,603. It recorded a population of 7,767 in 1990 and 14,167 in 2000.
