= La Trinidad =

La Trinidad could be:

- La Trinidad, Benguet, a municipality in the Philippines
- La Trinidad, Buenos Aires, a settlement in General Arenales Partido in Argentina
- La Trinidad, Estelí, a municipality in the Estelí department of Nicaragua
- La Trinidad, Panama
