= Astrothelium leucosessile =

Scientific classification
- Kingdom: Fungi
- Division: Ascomycota
- Class: Dothideomycetes
- Order: Trypetheliales
- Family: Trypetheliaceae
- Genus: Astrothelium
- Species: A. leucosessile

Binomial name
- Astrothelium leucosessile Lücking, M.P.Nelsen & Aptroot (2016)

Species of lichen

Astrothelium leucosessile is a species of corticolous (bark-dwelling), crustose lichen in the family Trypetheliaceae. Found in Panama, it was formally described as a new species in 2016 by Robert Lücking, Matthew Nelsen, and André Aptroot. The type specimen was collected by the first author from the Altos de Campana National Park (near Capira) at an altitude between 500 and 600 m (1,600 and 2,000 ft); there, in a submontane forest, it was found growing on the bark of roadside trees. The lichen has a smooth to uneven, light olive-grey thallus that covers areas of up to 5 cm (2 in), and has streaks of yellowish-white pruina. Both the thallus and the pseudostromata contain lichexanthone, which cause these structures to fluoresce yellow when lit with a long-wavelength UV light. The species epithet leucosessile refers to the whitish colour and sessile habit of the pseudostromata. The characteristics of the lichen that distinguish Astrothelium leucosessile from others in genus Astrothelium are its well delimited, whitish pseudostromata, which are prominent to sessile. Astrothelium phlyctaena is somewhat similar in appearance, but that species does not have conspicuous, sessile pseudostromata.
