= La Chorrera District =

La Chorrera
- District

- Location of the district capital in Panama
- Coordinates: 8°52′49″N 79°47′0″W
- Country: Panama
- Province: Panamá Oeste
- Capital: La Chorrera

Area
  - Total: 770 km^{2} (300 sq mi)

Population (2019)
  - Total: 199,708
- official estimate
- Time zone: UTC-5 (ETZ)

La Chorrera is a district (distrito) of Panamá Oeste Province in Panama. The population according to the 2000 census was 124,656; the latest official estimate (2019) is 199,708. The district covers a total area of 770 km^{2} (300 sq mi). The capital lies at the city of La Chorrera.

== Administrative divisions ==
The district is divided administratively into the following corregimientos:

- La Chorrera
- Barrio Balboa
- Barrio Colón
- Amador
- Arosemena
- El Arado
- El Coco
- Feuillet
- Guadalupe
- Herrera
- Hurtado
- Iturralde
- La Represa
- Los Díaz
- Mendoza
- Obaldía
- Playa Leona
- Puerto Caimito
- Santa Rita
