= Guadalupe, Panama =

Guadalupe
- Corregimiento
- Country: Panama
- Province: Panamá Oeste
- District: La Chorrera

Area
  - Land: 24.9 km^{2} (9.6 sq mi)

Population (2010)
  - Total: 34,242
  - Density: 1,374/km^{2} (3,560/sq mi)
- Population density calculated based on land area.
- Time zone: UTC−5 (EST)

Guadalupe is a corregimiento in La Chorrera District, Panamá Oeste Province, Panama with a population of 34,242 as of 2010. Its population as of 1990 was 18,015; its population as of 2000 was 26,857. Guadalupe's representative between 2009 and 2012 was Sumaya Judith Cedeño. It is part of the urban area of La Chorrera.
