= El Cacao =

El Cacao may refer to:

- El Cacao, Los Santos
- El Cacao, Panamá Oeste
- El Cacao, Veraguas, Panama
