= El Espino =

El Espino may refer to:

- El Espino, Spain
- El Espino, Panama
- El Espino, Boyacá, Colombia
- El Espino de Santa Rosa, Panama
