= Aimar Modelo =

Panamanian footballer (born 2005)

Personal information
- Full name: Aimar Taimir Modelo Johnson
- Date of birth: 25 January 2005 (age 21)
- Place of birth: Vacamonte, Panama
- Height: 1.74 m (5 ft 9 in)
- Position: Defender

Team information
- Current team: New York Red Bulls II (on loan from CAI de La Chorrera)
- Number: 52

Youth career
- CAI de La Chorrera
- 2023: → SKA Brasil (loan)

Senior career*
Years	Team	Apps	(Gls)
2022–	CAI de La Chorrera	44	(1)
2025–	→ New York Red Bulls II (loan)	25	(1)

International career^{‡}
2022–2024	Panama U20	8	(1)
2023–	Panama U23	1	(0)
2025–	Panama	1	(0)
- * Club domestic league appearances and goals as of 20:33, 15 November 2026 (UTC) ‡ National team caps and goals as of 6 February 2025

Aimar Taimir Modelo Johnson (born 25 January 2005) is a Panamanian professional footballer who plays as a defender for MLS Next Pro club New York Red Bulls II, on loan from CAI de La Chorrera.

== Career ==
=== CAI de La Chorrera ===
Born in Vacamonte, Aimar Modelo began his career with Panamanian club CAI de La Chorrera. He graduated from CAI's youth setup, and made his senior debut during the 2022 Torneo Apertura. On 19 February 2022, Modelo made his league debut against Herrera F.C., becoming the youngest defender to debut with the club at 17 years 25 days old.

In April 2023, Modelo joined Brazilian side SKA Brasil, participating in the Campeonato Paulista Sub-20 and the Copa Paulista Sub-20.

Modelo also became the second youngest player to score in the CONCACAF Central American Cup. On 21 August 2024, he scored the only goal in a 1–0 victory by CAI de La Chorrera over Port Layola F.C. at 19 years and 210 days. With CAI, the left-back Modelo also claimed three Liga Panameña de Fútbol titles.

==== Loan to New York Red Bulls II ====
On 29 January 2025, Modelo was loaned to New York Red Bulls II of MLS Next Pro. On 7 March 2025, Modelo made his debut for New York Red Bulls II appearuing as a starter in a 1–0 victory over Atlanta United 2.

== International career ==
Modelo has featured in Panama's squad at the 2022 CONCACAF U-20 Championship and 2024 CONCACAF U-20 Championship, earning 8 caps throughout the tournaments. On 31 July 2024, he scored the game winning extra time goal in a 2-1 2024 U-20 CONCACAF Championship Quarterfinal win over Canada. With the victory Panama qualified for the 2025 FIFA U-20 World Cup.

Modelo also made his debut with the Panama U-23 National Team, in a friendly match against Paraguay U-23 on 18 December 2023.

On 4 February 2025, Modelo along with New York Red Bulls II teammate Rafael Mosquera were called up to Panama’s senior National Team ahead of a friendly against Chile.

== Career statistics ==
=== Club ===
As of match played 10 October 2026

Appearances and goals by club, season and competition
Club	Season	League			National cup		Continental		Other		Total	
Club	Season	Division	Apps	Goals	Apps	Goals	Apps	Goals	Apps	Goals	Apps	Goals
CAI de La Chorrera	2022	Liga Panameña de Fútbol	15	0	—		—		—		15	0
CAI de La Chorrera	2023	Liga Panameña de Fútbol	5	0	—		—		—		5	0
CAI de La Chorrera	2024	Liga Panameña de Fútbol	24	1	0	0	5 (Note: Two appearances in CONCACAF Champions Cup, three appearances and one goal in CONCACAF Central American Cup)	1	0	0	29	2
CAI de La Chorrera	Total		44	1	0	0	5	1	0	0	49	2
New York Red Bulls II (loan)	2025	MLS Next Pro	4	0	—		—		2 (Note: Appearance(s) in MLS Next Pro play-offs)	0	6	0
New York Red Bulls II (loan)	2026	MLS Next Pro	21	1	—		—		1	0	22	1
New York Red Bulls II (loan)	Total		25	1	—		—		3	0	28	1
Career total			69	2	0	0	5	1	3	0	77	3

=== International ===
As of match played 9 February 2025

Appearances and goals by national team and year
National team	Year	Apps	Goals
Panama
Panama	2025	1	0
Total		1	0
