= Cirí de Los Sotos =

Cirí de los Sotos
- Corregimiento
- Location within Panama
- Country: Panama
- Province: Panamá Oeste
- District: Capira

Area
  - Land: 94.5 km^{2} (36.5 sq mi)

Population (2010)
  - Total: 2,288
  - Density: 24.2/km^{2} (63/sq mi)
- Population density calculated based on land area.
- Time zone: UTC−5 (EST)

Cirí de los Sotos is a corregimiento in Capira District, Panamá Oeste Province, Panama with a population of 2,288 as of 2010. Its population as of 1990 was 2,202; its population as of 2000 was 2,083.
