= La Ermita =

- Corregimiento
- Location within Panama
- Coordinates: 8.4667°N 80.0667°W
- Country: Panama
- Province: Panamá Oeste
- District: San Carlos

Area
  - Land: 33.2 km^{2} (12.8 sq mi)

Population (2010)
  - Total: 1,571
  - Density: 47.4/km^{2} (123/sq mi)
- Population density calculated based on land area.
- Time zone: UTC−5 (EST)

La Ermita is a corregimiento in San Carlos District, Panamá Oeste Province, Panama with a population of 1,571 as of 2010. Its population as of 1990 was 1,097; its population as of 2000 was 1,218.
