= San José, Panamá Oeste =

San José
- Corregimiento
- Location within Panama
- Coordinates: 8.5347°N 79.9250°W
- Country: Panama
- Province: Panamá Oeste
- District: San Carlos

Area
  - Land: 28.3 km^{2} (10.9 sq mi)

Population (2010)
  - Total: 2,729
  - Density: 96.4/km^{2} (250/sq mi)
- Population density calculated based on land area.
- Time zone: UTC−5 (EST)

San José is a corregimiento in San Carlos District, Panamá Oeste Province, Panama with a population of 2,729 as of 2010. Its population as of 1990 was 1,436; its population as of 2000 was 2,167.
