= Los Díaz =

- Corregimiento
- Location within Panama
- Country: Panama
- Province: Panamá Oeste
- District: La Chorrera

Area
  - Land: 29.4 km^{2} (11.4 sq mi)

Population (2010)
  - Total: 1,200
  - Density: 40.8/km^{2} (106/sq mi)
- Population density calculated based on land area.
- Time zone: UTC−5 (EST)

Los Díaz is a corregimiento in La Chorrera District, Panamá Oeste Province, Panama with a population of 1,200 as of 2010. Its population as of 1990 was 858; its population as of 2000 was 893.
