= Playa Leona =

- Corregimiento
- Location within Panama
- Coordinates: 8.7889°N 79.7717°W
- Country: Panama
- Province: Panamá Oeste
- District: La Chorrera

Area
  - Land: 52.9 km^{2} (20.4 sq mi)

Population (2010)
  - Total: 8,442
  - Density: 159.6/km^{2} (413/sq mi)
- Population density calculated based on land area.
- Time zone: UTC−5 (EST)

Playa Leona is a corregimiento in La Chorrera District, Panamá Oeste Province, Panama with a population of 8,442 as of 2010. Its population as of 1990 was 4,279; its population as of 2000 was 6,706.
