= Chicheme =

Beverage from Latin America

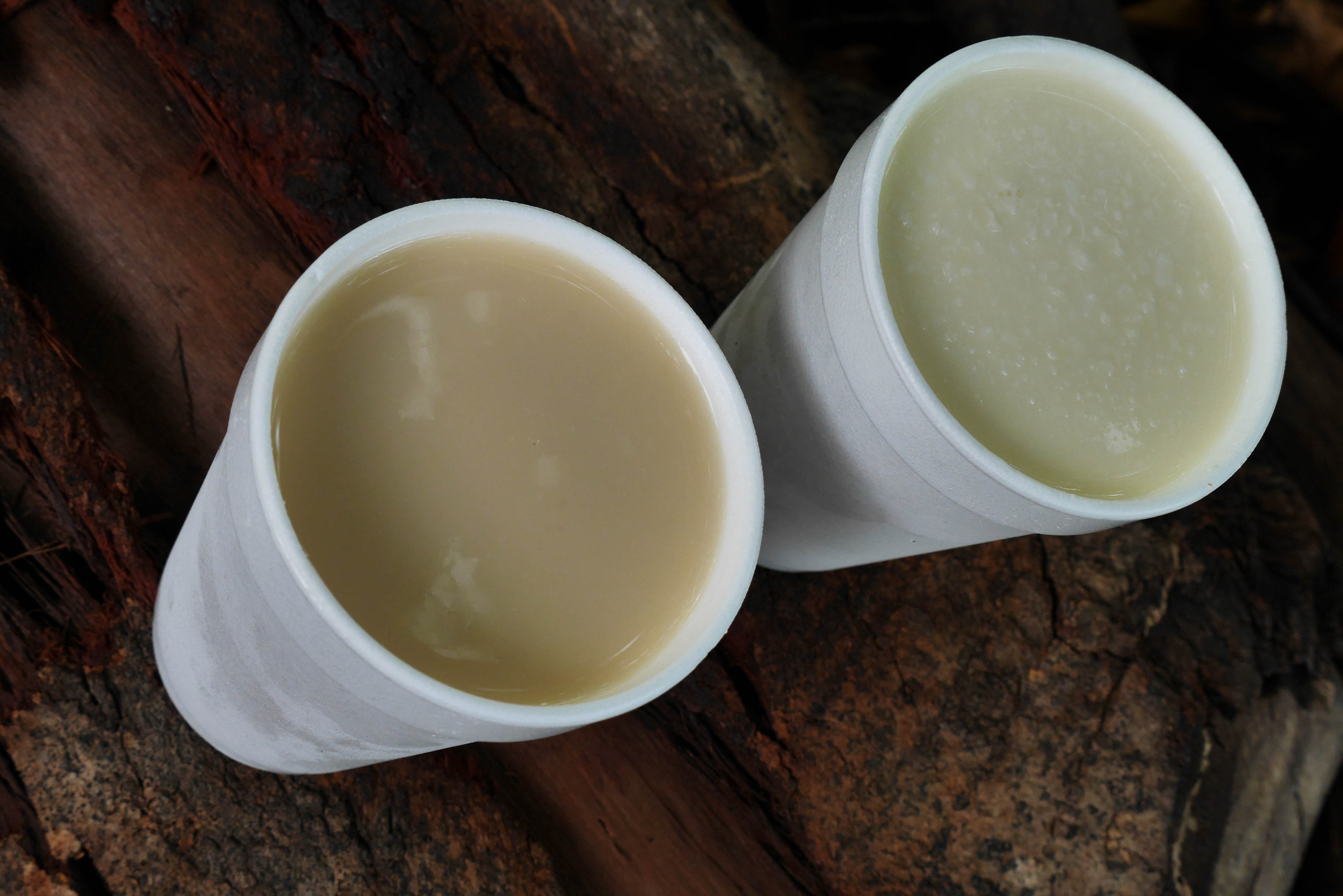
- Chicheme and fermented milk
- Type: Beverage
- Origin: Colombia, Costa Rica, and Panama
- Ingredients: Corn, milk, sugar, cinnamon

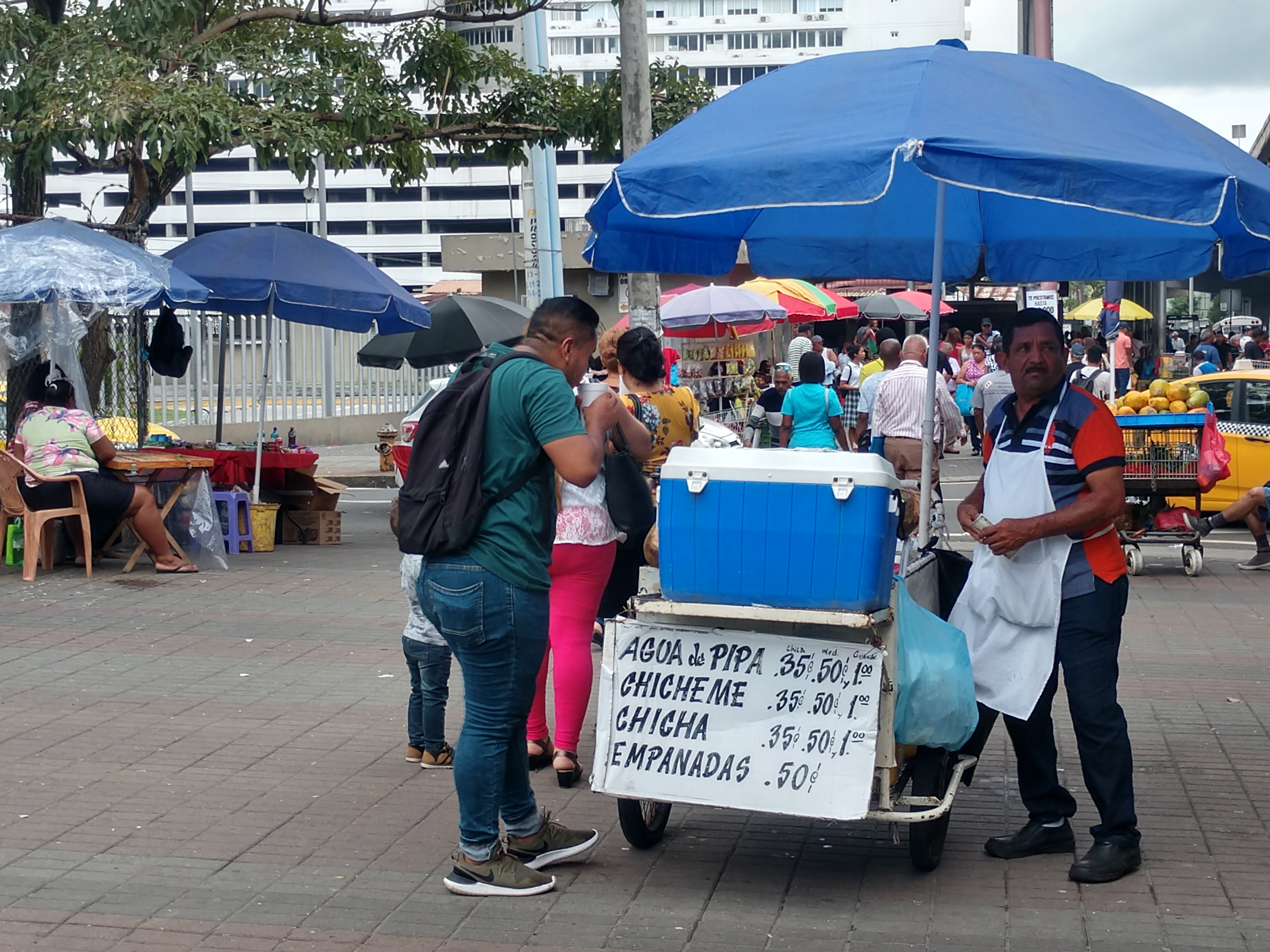
Street vendor selling chicheme among other food and beverages in Panama City

Chicheme is a beverage consisting of fermented atole or cream, made from pounded corn. It is traditional in some Latin American countries and regions such as the Caribbean coast of Costa Rica, Colombia (mainly in the municipality of Ciénaga de Oro in Córdoba), and Panama (mainly in the Chiriquí Province and La Chorrera in the Panama Oeste Province). Additionally, in the Guanacaste Province in northern Costa Rica, it is also made with purple corn.

It is mainly made from corn, to which spices such as cinnamon and nutmeg are added, along with water, panela, and ginger. There are many preparations depending on the locality. Generally, after mixing the ingredients, it is allowed to ferment gradually, soaking the corn and then finely grinding it. The resulting dough is cooked and cold water is added to strain it.

The word "chicheme" seems to come from Nahuatl, derived from "chicha" (fermented corn wine), although it may come from the Guna word "chichab" (corn) or the Mozarabic "chichen" (to cook, to boil).
