= Sorá =

- Corregimiento
- Location within Panama
- Coordinates: 8.634°N 80.009°W
- Country: Panama
- Province: Panamá Oeste
- District: Chame

Area
  - Land: 76.2 km^{2} (29.4 sq mi)

Population (2010)
  - Total: 1,653
  - Density: 21.7/km^{2} (56/sq mi)
- Population density calculated based on land area.
- Time zone: UTC−5 (EST)

Sorá is a corregimiento in Chame District, Panamá Oeste Province, Panama, with a population of 1,653 as of 2010. Its population as of 1990 was 1,082; its population as of 2000 was 1,290.
