= La Represa =

- Corregimiento
- Location within Panama
- Coordinates: 8.98333°N 79.8167°W
- Country: Panama
- Province: Panamá Oeste
- District: La Chorrera

Area
  - Land: 38.1 km^{2} (14.7 sq mi)

Population (2010)
  - Total: 681
  - Density: 17.9/km^{2} (46/sq mi)
- Population density calculated based on land area.
- Time zone: UTC−5 (EST)

La Represa is a corregimiento in La Chorrera District, Panamá Oeste Province, Panama with a population of 681 as of 2010. Its population as of 1990 was 650; its population as of 2000 was 696. Most recently, its population was recorded as 796 in 2015.
