= Chicá =

- Corregimiento
- Location within Panama
- Coordinates: 8.6653°N 79.9383°W
- Country: Panama
- Province: Panamá Oeste
- District: Chame

Area
  - Land: 19.2 km^{2} (7.4 sq mi)

Population (2010)
  - Total: 713
  - Density: 37.1/km^{2} (96/sq mi)
- Population density calculated based on land area.
- Time zone: UTC−5 (EST)

Chicá is a corregimiento in Chame District, Panamá Oeste Province, Panama with a population of 713 as of 2010. Its population as of 1990 was 610; its population as of 2000 was 600.
