= Hurtado, Panama =

Hurtado
- Corregimiento
- Location within Panama
- Country: Panama
- Province: Panamá Oeste
- District: La Chorrera

Area
  - Land: 47.5 km^{2} (18.3 sq mi)

Population (2010)
  - Total: 1,206
  - Density: 25.4/km^{2} (66/sq mi)
- Population density calculated based on land area.
- Time zone: UTC−5 (EST)

Hurtado is a corregimiento in La Chorrera District, Panamá Oeste Province, Panama with a population of 1,206 as of 2010. Its population as of 1990 was 703; its population as of 2000 was 893.
