= Héctor Maisonave =

Puerto Rican businessman

- Born: June 30, 1930; Barceloneta, Puerto Rico
- Died: December 13, 2022 (aged 92); North Bergen, New Jersey
- Occupations: music entrepreneur and talent manager
- Website: www.maisonavemanagementmusic.com

Héctor Maisonave (June 30, 1930 – December 13, 2022) was a music entrepreneur and talent manager. During a sixty-year career, from 1954 through 2014, Maisonave organized over 7,000 Latin music concerts on five continents.

In 2010, in New York's Lincoln Center for the Performing Arts, he received their Lifetime Achievement Award for leadership and contributions to the world of music.

== Early years ==
Maisonave was born on June 30, 1930, in Barceloneta, Puerto Rico, where he attended Abraham Lincoln High School. In 1947, his family moved to New York City, where he graduated from William John Gaynor High School in 1948 (P.S 49 in Brooklyn).

== Military duty ==
In 1951, during the Korean War, Maisonave was drafted for service with the United States Army. To reduce the impact of language barriers, the Spanish speaking Maisonave was sent to Amador, Panama, for his 18 weeks of basic training. After training, Maisonave was assigned to the 65th Infantry Regiment (the "Borinqueneers"), a predominantly Puerto Rican regiment. Maisonave participated in action in the Korean War for three years. In 1954, Maisonave was honorably discharged from the U.S. Army, and returned to New York City.

In 2014, the Borinqueneers, and collectively each of its soldiers who had served with the regiment between 1899 and 1956, were awarded the Borinqueneers Congressional Gold Medal, for their sacrifice and service to the American people.

== Music promotion and talent management ==
Héctor Lavoe performing live in New York City circa 1985.

Upon his return to New York, Maisonave studied at the Delhente Institute of Technology and graduated in 1957 with a degree in Musicology. Immediately thereafter he began organizing Salsa music concerts in Las Villas, a vacation resort area in Newburgh and Plattekill, New York. He also organized concerts on Hudson River boats to Bear Mountain, and night cruises called "Moonlight on the Hudson."

Maisonave also organized concerts in Zaire during the 1974 boxing match known as The Rumble in the Jungle between Muhammad Ali and George Foreman, a concert in Honolulu with Celia Cruz, and concerts in London, Buenos Aires, and nearly every country in South America. During his sixty-year career, from 1954 through 2014, Maisonave organized over 7,000 concerts on five continents.

It all began with the early bus trips to Las Villas, where attendees could enjoy live performances by popular salsa artists in a welcoming and sociable environment/atmosphere. As Maisonave recalled "For $10 you got the bus trip, arroz con gandules, pork ice cream, and dancing!"

External videos
- Private interview (in Spanish) with Héctor Maisonave

Maisonave also managed and/or promoted the musical careers of Héctor Lavoe, Celia Cruz, La Lupe, El Gran Combo, Cortijo y su Combo, Tito Rodriguez, La India, Joe Cuba, Willie Colón, Ismael Rivera, Sonora Ponceña, and dozens of others.

Maisonave's management of Hector's Lavoe's musical career yielded several classic Salsa albums including El Sabio (1980), Qué Sentimiento (1981), Vigilante (1983), Reventó (1985) and Strikes Back (1987).

== Casa Blanca Club ==
External videos
- New Jersey Assemblyman Angel Fuentes honors Héctor Maisonave on his 2013 birthday

In the late 1970s Maisonave was also a dance club promoter in New York City and worked for Robert Tirado who was the owner of the famous Casablanca nightclub. Casablanca was the home for many famous Latin entertainers who performed throughout the 1970s and 1980s. Casablanca was located on 1674 Broadway, which is also the site of the old Birdland club. With a music format that included popular radio DJs and four live bands nightly, Maisonave helped Robert Tirado double the club attendance.

Casa Blanca often drew crowds larger than Studio 54 - its neighbor just two blocks away - with lines that extended down Broadway, and spilled onto West 52nd Street.

== Recent work ==
Maisonave continued to be active in the music world. His company - Maisonave Management - lists talent booking, concert promotions, music publishing and copyrighting amongst its many current services.

Over the past few years Maisonave has promoted concerts for Grupo Manía, Tito Rojas and José Alberto "El Canario". He also continued to manage the musical careers of La India and Tito Nieves.

La India is set to release her tenth studio album with Top Stop Music.

== Awards and recognition ==
The following is a partial listing of Maisonave's professional citations and awards over the years:

- Lifetime Achievement Award, Lincoln Center (2010)
- Medal of Honor, Senate of Puerto Rico (2010)
- Philadelphia City Council Proclamation (2012)
- Grand Marshal of the Philadelphia Puerto Rican Day Parade (2013)
- Grand Marshal of the New York City Three Kings Day Parade (2014)
- Grammy Award (received jointly with Grupo Manía)
- Billboard, ACE, and Lo Nuestro awards
- Congressional Gold Medal, as a member of the Borinqueneers (2015)
- The city of West New York, New Jersey officially named the corner of 59th St. and Park Ave, near his long-time residence, as "PV1 Hector Maisonave Way" at a 2018 ceremony and street signage unveiling by Mayor Felix Roque
- Nominated by Margaret Santiago for the Taine Award, Hector Maisonave won the award by the popular vote, the award was presented to him on March 30, 2019 by The Taino Nation Entertainment LLC
- April 11, 2019, he received The Key to the City of West New York by Mayor Felix Roque

== See also ==
- List of Puerto Ricans
- Music of Puerto Rico
- Salsa music
- Boogaloo
- Nuyorican Movement
