= Feuillet, Panama =

Feuillet
- Corregimiento
- Location within Panama
- Country: Panama
- Province: Panamá Oeste
- District: La Chorrera

Area
  - Land: 19.4 km^{2} (7.5 sq mi)

Population (2010)
  - Total: 2,669
  - Density: 137.9/km^{2} (357/sq mi)
- Population density calculated based on land area.
- Time zone: UTC−5 (EST)

Feuillet is a corregimiento in La Chorrera District, Panamá Oeste Province, Panama with a population of 2,669 as of 2010. Its population as of 1990 was 1,372; its population as of 2000 was 1,745.
