= Santa Rosa, Panamá Oeste =

Santa Rosa
- Corregimiento
- Location within Panama
- Coordinates: 8.8731°N 80.1014°W
- Country: Panama
- Province: Panamá Oeste
- District: Capira
- Established: January 19, 1998

Area
  - Land: 93 km^{2} (36 sq mi)

Population (2010)
  - Total: 1,767
  - Density: 19/km^{2} (49/sq mi)
- Population density calculated based on land area.
- Time zone: UTC−5 (EST)

Santa Rosa is a corregimiento in Capira District, Panamá Oeste Province, Panama with a population of 1,767 as of 2010. It was created by Law 5 of January 19, 1998. Its population as of 2000 was 1,597.
