= Cirí Grande =

- Corregimiento
- Location within Panama
- Country: Panama
- Province: Panamá Oeste
- District: Capira

Area
  - Land: 147.5 km^{2} (57.0 sq mi)

Population (2010)
  - Total: 3,635
  - Density: 24.6/km^{2} (64/sq mi)
- Population density calculated based on land area.
- Time zone: UTC−5 (EST)

Cirí Grande is a corregimiento in Capira District, Panamá Oeste Province, Panama with a population of 3,635 as of 2010. Its population as of 1990 was 4,138; its population as of 2000 was 3,079.
