= Las Guías Oriente =

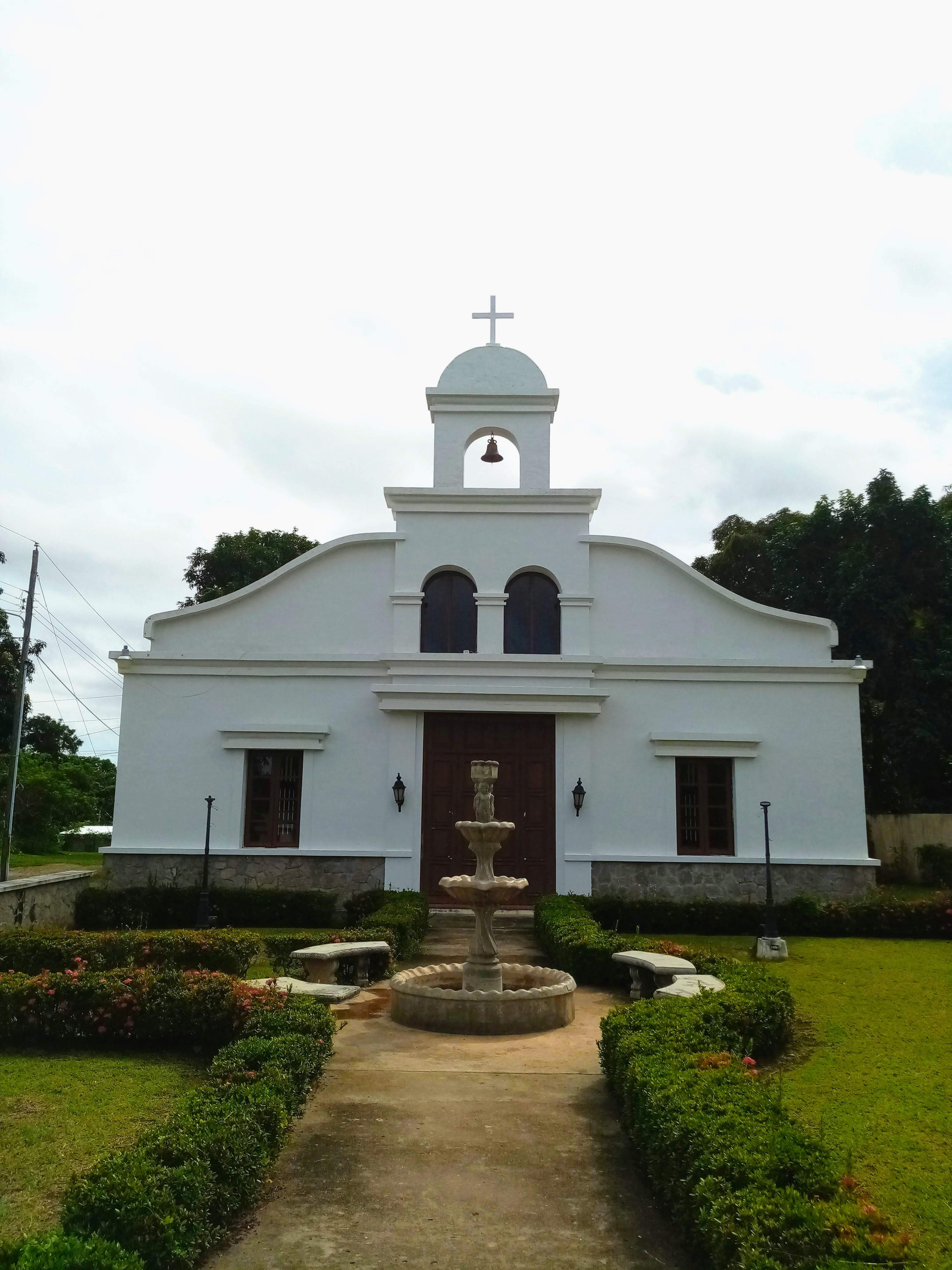

- Location within Panama
- Coordinates: 8°25′48″N 80°4′12″W
- Country: Panama
- Province: Coclé
- District: Antón
- Corregiment: Río Hato

Population (2008)
  - Total: 1 274
- Website: https://www.facebook.com/pages/Las-Gu%C3%ADas-Oriente/107809455908164

Las Guías Oriente is a community of the corregiment of Río Hato in the district of Antón, in the Coclé province of the Panama Republic.

It borders to the north with the community of La Mata, to the south with the Pacific Ocean, to the east with the province of Panamá Oeste and to the west with the community of El Platanal.

It is the bordering community where the territorial division of Coclé begins.

== Sources ==
- World Gazeteer: Panama – World-Gazetteer.com
