= San Vicente de Bique =

- Location within Panama
- Coordinates: 8°55′12″N 79°40′48″W
- Country: Panama
- Province: Panamá Oeste

Population (2008)
  - Total: 1 989
- Time zone: UTC−5 (EST)

San Vicente de Bique is a town in Arraiján District in the Panamá Oeste Province of Panama.
