= Icantí =

- Location within Panama
- Coordinates: 9°12′36″N 78°40′48″W
- Country: Panama
- Province: Kuna de Madungandí

Population (2008)
  - Total: 718

Icantí is a town in the Kuna de Madungandí province of Panama.

== Sources ==
- World Gazeteer: Panama – World-Gazetteer.com
