= Bejuco, Panama =

Bejuco
- Corregimiento
- Location within Panama
- Coordinates: 8.6000°N 79.8833°W
- Country: Panama
- Province: Panamá Oeste
- District: Chame

Area
  - Land: 59.6 km^{2} (23.0 sq mi)

Population (2010)
  - Total: 5,548
  - Density: 93/km^{2} (240/sq mi)
- Population density calculated based on land area.
- Time zone: UTC−5 (EST)

Bejuco is a corregimiento in Chame District, Panamá Oeste Province, Panama with a population of 5,548 as of 2010. Its population as of 1990 was 3,643; its population as of 2000 was 4,509.
