= Las Uvas =

- Corregimiento
- Location within Panama
- Coordinates: 8.4667°N 80.0000°W
- Country: Panama
- Province: Panamá Oeste
- District: San Carlos

Area
  - Land: 18.1 km^{2} (7.0 sq mi)

Population (2010)
  - Total: 1,587
  - Density: 87.7/km^{2} (227/sq mi)
- Population density calculated based on land area.
- Time zone: UTC−5 (EST)

Las Uvas is a corregimiento in San Carlos District, Panamá Oeste Province, Panama with a population of 1,587 as of 2010. Its population as of 1990 was 1,170; its population as of 2000 was 1,424.
