= Mendoza, Panama =

Mendoza
- Corregimiento
- Location within Panama
- Coordinates: 9.0161°N 79.8481°W
- Country: Panama
- Province: Panamá Oeste
- District: La Chorrera

Area
  - Land: 38.1 km^{2} (14.7 sq mi)

Population (2010)
  - Total: 1,233
  - Density: 32.4/km^{2} (84/sq mi)
- Population density calculated based on land area.
- Time zone: UTC−5 (EST)

Mendoza is a corregimiento in La Chorrera District, Panamá Oeste Province, Panama with a population of 1,233 as of 2010. Its population as of 1990 was 851; its population as of 2000 was 1,053.
