= Las Ollas Arriba =

- Corregimiento
- Location within Panama
- Country: Panama
- Province: Panamá Oeste
- District: Capira

Area
  - Land: 25 km^{2} (9.7 sq mi)

Population (2010)
  - Total: 1,201
  - Density: 48/km^{2} (120/sq mi)
- Population density calculated based on land area.
- Time zone: UTC−5 (EST)

Las Ollas Arriba is a corregimiento in Capira District, Panamá Oeste Province, Panama with a population of 1,201 as of 2010. Its population as of 1990 was 803; its population as of 2000 was 952.
