= Caimito, Panama =

Coordinates: 8.8167°N 79.9500°W

Caimito
- Corregimiento
- Location within Panama
- Country: Panama
- Province: Panamá Oeste
- District: Capira

Area
  - Land: 43.8 km^{2} (16.9 sq mi)

Population (2010)
  - Total: 1,635
  - Density: 37.3/km^{2} (97/sq mi)
- Population density calculated based on land area.
- Time zone: UTC−5 (EST)

Caimito is a corregimiento in Capira District, Panamá Oeste Province, Panama, with a population of 1,635 in 2010. Its population in 1990 was 1,319 and in 2000 was 1,438.
