= Las Lajas, Panamá Oeste =

Las Lajas
- Corregimiento
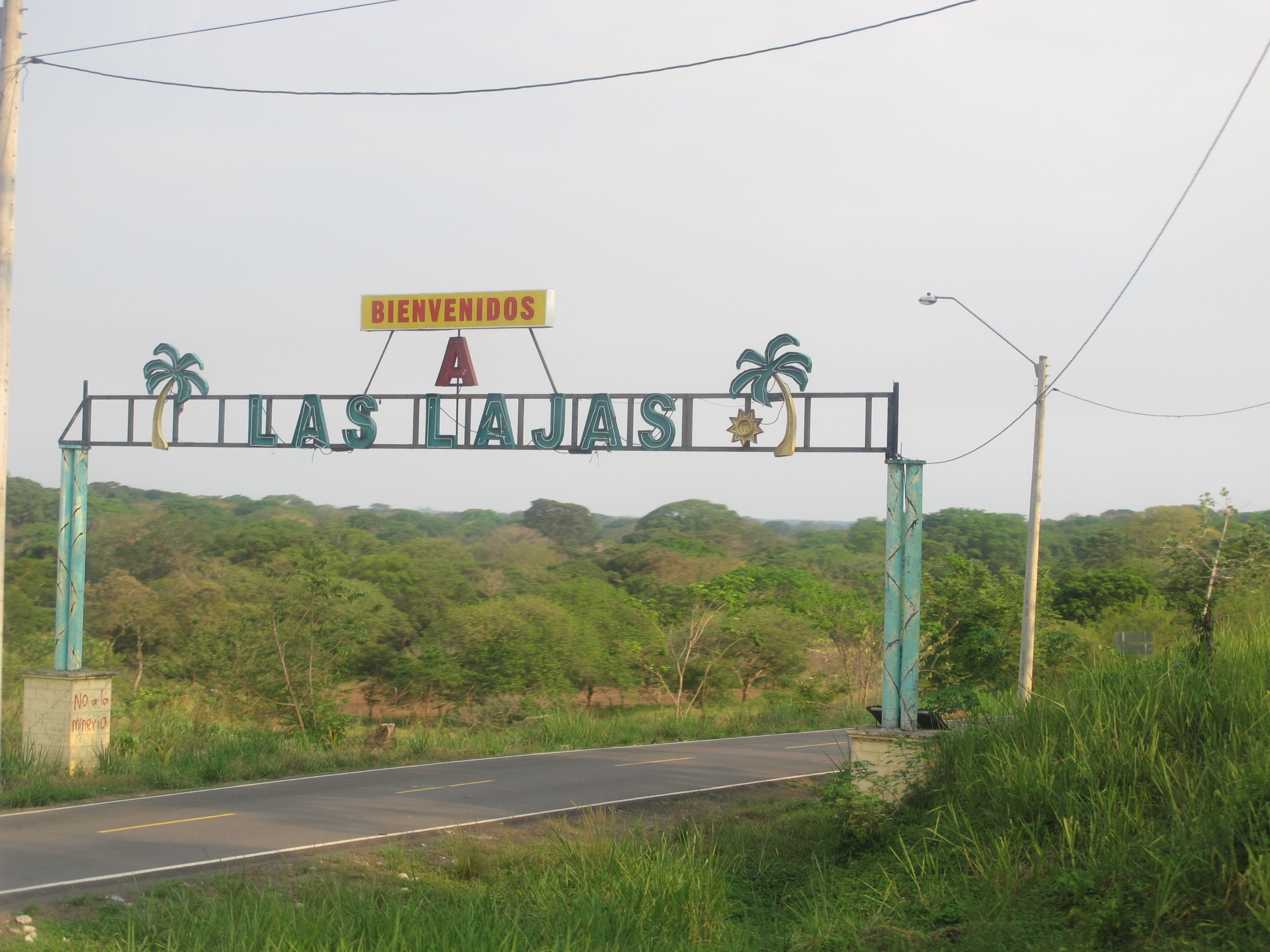

- Location within Panama
- Coordinates: 8.5500°N 79.9306°W
- Country: Panama
- Province: Panamá Oeste
- District: Chame

Area
  - Land: 13.3 km^{2} (5.1 sq mi)

Population (2010)
  - Total: 3,431
  - Density: 258.4/km^{2} (669/sq mi)
- Population density calculated based on land area.
- Time zone: UTC−5 (EST)

Las Lajas is a corregimiento in Chame District, Panamá Oeste Province, Panama with a population of 3,431 as of 2010. Its population as of 1990 was 1,602; its population as of 2000 was 2,531.
