= Los Llanitos =

- Corregimiento
- Location within Panama
- Coordinates: 8.7167°N 79.9167°W
- Country: Panama
- Province: Panamá Oeste
- District: San Carlos

Area
  - Land: 61.6 km^{2} (23.8 sq mi)

Population (2010)
  - Total: 3,264
  - Density: 52.9/km^{2} (137/sq mi)
- Population density calculated based on land area.
- Time zone: UTC−5 (EST)

Los Llanitos is a corregimiento in San Carlos District, Panamá Oeste Province, Panama with a population of 3,264 as of 2010. Its population as of 1990 was 2,370; its population as of 2000 was 2,708.
