= Barrio Colón, Panama =

Barrio Colón
- Location within Panama
- Coordinates: 8°52′12″N 79°43′12″W
- Country: Panama
- Province: Panamá

Population (2010)
  - Total: 29,589

Barrio Colón is one of the 18 corregimientos of La Chorrera District. The population is 33,214, and its representative is Pedro A. Montero H..
