= La Laguna, Panama =

La Laguna
- Corregimiento
- Location within Panama
- Coordinates: 8.5992°N 80.0503°W
- Country: Panama
- Province: Panamá Oeste
- District: San Carlos

Area
  - Land: 54.1 km^{2} (20.9 sq mi)

Population (2010)
  - Total: 1,132
  - Density: 20.9/km^{2} (54/sq mi)
- Population density calculated based on land area.
- Time zone: UTC−5 (EST)

La Laguna is a corregimiento in San Carlos District, Panamá Oeste Province, Panama with a population of 1,132 as of 2010. Its population as of 1990 was 778; its population as of 2000 was 968.

LagunaSanCarlos-Panama
