= San Carlos District, Panama =

San Carlos
- District

- Location of the district capital in Panama
- Coordinates: 8°29′N 79°57′W
- Country: Panama
- Province: Panamá Oeste
- Capital: San Carlos

Area
  - Total: 131 sq mi (338 km^{2})

Population (2019)
  - Total: 24,001
- official estimate
- Time zone: UTC-5 (ETZ)

San Carlos is a district (distrito) of West Panamá Province in Panama. The population according to the 2000 census was 15,541; the latest official estimate (for 2019) is 24,001. The district covers a total area of 338 km^{2} (131 sq mi).

The capital city of the District is named San Carlos as well.

== Administrative divisions ==
San Carlos District is divided administratively into the following corregimientos:

- San Carlos (capital)
- El Espino
- El Higo
- Guayabito
- La Ermita
- La Laguna
- Las Uvas
- Los Llanitos
- San José
