= Herrera (corregimiento) =

- Corregimiento
- Location within Panama
- Country: Panama
- Province: Panamá Oeste
- District: La Chorrera

Area
  - Land: 85.9 km^{2} (33.2 sq mi)

Population (2010)
  - Total: 2,552
  - Density: 29.7/km^{2} (77/sq mi)
- Population density calculated based on land area.
- Time zone: UTC−5 (EST)

Herrera is a corregimiento in La Chorrera District, Panamá Oeste Province, Panama with a population of 2,552 as of 2010. Its population as of 1990 was 715; its population as of 2000 was 812.
