= Barrio Balboa, Panama =

Barrio Balboa
- Location within Panama
- Coordinates: 8°52′12″N 79°43′12″W
- Country: Panama
- Province: Panamá Oeste

Population (2010)
  - Total: 29,589

Barrio Balboa is one of the 18 corregimientos of La Chorrera District, Panamá Oeste Province, Panama. As of 2010, ihe population is of 29,589, and its representative is Tomás Velásquez Correa.
