= Buenos Aires, Chame =

Buenos Aires
- Corregimiento
- Location within Panama
- Coordinates: 8.6325°N 79.9486°W
- Country: Panama
- Province: Panamá Oeste
- District: Chame

Area
  - Land: 39.9 km^{2} (15.4 sq mi)

Population (2010)
  - Total: 2,030
  - Density: 50.8/km^{2} (132/sq mi)
- Population density calculated based on land area.
- Time zone: UTC−5 (EST)

Buenos Aires is a corregimiento in Chame District, Panamá Oeste Province, Panama with a population of 2,030 as of 2010. Its population as of 1990 was 1,435; its population as of 2000 was 1,615.
