= Arosemena, Panama =

Arosemena
- Corregimiento
- Location within Panama
- Coordinates: 8.9728°N 79.9647°W
- Country: Panama
- Province: Panamá Oeste
- District: La Chorrera

Area
  - Land: 31.6 km^{2} (12.2 sq mi)

Population (2010)
  - Total: 426
  - Density: 13.5/km^{2} (35/sq mi)
- Population density calculated based on land area.
- Time zone: UTC−5 (EST)

Arosemena is a corregimiento in La Chorrera District, Panamá Oeste Province, Panama with a population of 426 as of 2010. Its population as of 1990 was 340; its population as of 2000 was 290.
