= Ipetí =

- Location within Panama
- Coordinates: 8°58′12″N 78°30′36″W
- Country: Panama
- Province: Kuna de Madungandí

Population (2008)
  - Total: 727

Ipetí is a town in Kuna de Madungandí province of Panama.

== Sources ==
- World Gazeteer: Panama – World-Gazetteer.com
