= Cabuya, Panamá Oeste =

Cabuya
- Corregimiento
- Location within Panama
- Coordinates: 8.5833°N 79.9167°W
- Country: Panama
- Province: Panamá Oeste
- District: Chame

Area
  - Land: 44.8 km^{2} (17.3 sq mi)

Population (2010)
  - Total: 1,666
  - Density: 37.2/km^{2} (96/sq mi)
- Population density calculated based on land area.
- Time zone: UTC−5 (EST)

Cabuya is a corregimiento in Chame District, Panamá Oeste Province, Panama with a population of 1,666 as of 2010. Its population as of 1990 was 1,206; its population as of 2000 was 1,354.
