= Iturralde, Panama =

Iturralde
- Corregimiento
- Location within Panama
- Country: Panama
- Province: Panamá Oeste
- District: La Chorrera

Area
  - Land: 64.3 km^{2} (24.8 sq mi)

Population (2010)
  - Total: 1,354
  - Density: 21/km^{2} (54/sq mi)
- Population density calculated based on land area.
- Time zone: UTC−5 (EST)

Iturralde is a corregimiento in La Chorrera District, Panamá Oeste Province, Panama with a population of 1,354 as of 2010. Its population as of 1990 was 792; its population as of 2000 was 927.
