= El Higo, Panama =

El Higo
- Corregimiento
- Location within Panama
- Coordinates: 8.4514°N 80.0383°W
- Country: Panama
- Province: Panamá Oeste
- District: San Carlos

Area
  - Land: 44 km^{2} (17 sq mi)

Population (2010)
  - Total: 2,710
  - Density: 61.6/km^{2} (160/sq mi)
- Population density calculated based on land area.
- Time zone: UTC−5 (EST)

El Higo is a corregimiento in San Carlos District, Panamá Oeste Province, Panama with a population of 2,710 as of 2010. Its population as of 1990 was 1,920; its population as of 2000 was 2,341.
