= Guayabito =

Coordinates: 8.5336°N 80.0000°W

- Corregimiento
- Location within Panama
- Country: Panama
- Province: Panamá Oeste
- District: San Carlos

Area
  - Land: 34.1 km^{2} (13.2 sq mi)

Population (2010)
  - Total: 502
  - Density: 14.7/km^{2} (38/sq mi)
- Population density calculated based on land area.
- Time zone: UTC−5 (EST)

Guayabito is a corregimiento in San Carlos District, Panamá Oeste Province, Panama with a population of 502 as of 2010. Its population as of 1990 was 443; its population as of 2000 was 481.
