= Campana, Panama =

Campana
- Corregimiento
- Location within Panama
- Coordinates: 8.7167°N 79.9000°W
- Country: Panama
- Province: Panamá Oeste
- District: Capira

Area
  - Land: 75.1 km^{2} (29.0 sq mi)

Population (2010)
  - Total: 2,067
  - Density: 27.5/km^{2} (71/sq mi)
- Population density calculated based on land area.
- Time zone: UTC−5 (EST)

Campana is a corregimiento in Capira District, Panamá Oeste Province, Panama with a population of 2,067 as of 2010. Its population as of 1990 was 1,363; its population as of 2000 was 1,692.
