= Obaldía, Panama =

Obaldía
- Corregimiento
- Location within Panama
- Coordinates: 8.883333°N 79.95°W
- Country: Panama
- Province: Panamá Oeste
- District: La Chorrera

Area
  - Land: 34.6 km^{2} (13.4 sq mi)

Population (2010)
  - Total: 549
  - Density: 15.9/km^{2} (41/sq mi)
- Population density calculated based on land area.
- Time zone: UTC−5 (EST)

Obaldía is a corregimiento in La Chorrera District, Panamá Oeste Province, Panama with a population of 549 as of 2010. Its population as of 1990 was 559; its population as of 2000 was 554.
