= El Líbano =

- Corregimiento
- Location within Panama
- Country: Panama
- Province: Panamá Oeste
- District: Chame

Area
  - Land: 30.9 km^{2} (11.9 sq mi)

Population (2010)
  - Total: 200
  - Density: 6.5/km^{2} (17/sq mi)
- Population density calculated based on land area.
- Time zone: UTC−5 (EST)

El Líbano is a subdivision of a district in Chame District, Panamá Oeste Province, Panama with a population of 200 as of 2010. Its population as of 1990 was 177; its population as of 2000 was 191.
