= El Arado =

- Corregimiento
- Location within Panama
- Coordinates: 8.9672°N 79.7586°W
- Country: Panama
- Province: Panamá Oeste
- District: La Chorrera

Area
  - Land: 70.4 km^{2} (27.2 sq mi)

Population (2010)
  - Total: 2,715
  - Density: 38.6/km^{2} (100/sq mi)
- Population density calculated based on land area.
- Time zone: UTC−5 (EST)

El Arado is a corregimiento in La Chorrera District, Panamá Oeste Province, Panama, with a population of 2,715 as of 2010. Its population in 2000 was 2,012, and its population in 1990 was 1,696.
