= Panamanian Spanish =

Variety of Spanish language

- Español panameño
- Pronunciation: [espaˈɲol panaˈmeɲo]
- Native to: Panama
- Native speakers: 4,400,000 (2025)
- Language family: Indo-European: Italic; Latino-Faliscan; Romance; Western; Ibero-Romance; West Iberian; Castilian; Spanish; Caribbean Spanish or Colombian Spanish; Panamanian Spanish
- Early forms: Proto-Indo-European: Proto-Italic; Old Latin; Vulgar Latin; Proto-Romance; Old Spanish; Early Modern Spanish
- Writing system: Latin (Spanish alphabet)

Official status
- Regulated by: Academia Panameña de la Lengua

Language codes
- ISO 639-1: es
- ISO 639-2: spa
- ISO 639-3: –
- Glottolog: None
- IETF: es-PA

Panamanian Spanish is the Spanish language as spoken in the country of Panama. Despite Panama's location in Central America, Panamanian Spanish is considered a Caribbean variety.

The variations among different speaker groups of the same language can be lexical (vocabulary), phonological (pronunciation), morphological (word forms), or in the use of syntax (grammar).

Historically, Panama and Colombia were part of the same political entity. Colombia, governed from the Real Audiencia of Panama during the 16th century, then part of Castilla de Oro, with its capital in Panama, during the 17th century, and after independence from Spain, Panama voluntarily became part of the Republic of Gran Colombia along with Venezuela and Ecuador, with its capital in Bogota. From the colonial times and periods and also during most of the 19th century and until 1903, and even though there are still lexical similarities shared by the two countries (e.g., pelao in both Colombia and Panama means 'kid' or 'child'), phonetically, Panamanian Spanish is very similar to the Spanish as spoken in the coastal areas around the Caribbean, specifically Cuba, Puerto Rico, the Dominican Republic and the Caribbean coasts of Colombia and Venezuela. As Panama is located in Central America, Panamanian Spanish is transitional between Central American and Caribbean dialects.

== Phonology ==
A notable characteristic of Panamanian Spanish, and other varieties of Caribbean Spanish, is the debuccalization of the /s/ sound at the end of a syllable or word, such as in the word cascada, 'waterfall', pronounced [kahˈkaða] (like "h" in the English word "he") instead of [kasˈkaða]. This results in a phonetic merger with /x/. The aspiration is also observed in Central American Spanish; the coastal regions of Peru and Ecuador; in Chile, Argentina, and Uruguay; and in Andalusia and the Canary Islands of Spain. This /s/ can also be pronounced as a voiceless velar fricative [x] when before /k/ or /g/.

As in many other varieties, word-final /n/ is often velarized in Panamanian Spanish. Word-final /n/ is more often elided on the Costa Arriba of Colón Province, east of the city of Colón, than in Panama City.

Another change observed in Panamanian Spanish is the deaffrication of /tʃ/ (as "ch" in the English word "chips") to [ʃ] (as "sh" in the English word "she"), so muchacho is pronounced [muˈʃaʃo], rather than [muˈtʃatʃo]. It is found primarily among less-educated speakers, but it can sometimes be observed among better-educated speakers, as in Andalusian Spanish. The [ʃ] sound is also typical in dialects of Cuba, north Mexico, and Chile, the latter is where this sound is also more stigmatized among less-educated speakers.

As in most of the Spanish-speaking world, word-final /d/ is typically deleted in informal Panamanian Spanish.

The trilled R is often pronounced with a preceding [h] sound.

Throughout rural Panama, as in much of the rest of the Spanish-speaking world, /f/ is usually pronounced as a voiceless bilabial fricative, that is, with both of the lips rather than with the bottom lip and the upper teeth.

In much of rural Panama, but not in the Costa Arriba of Colón Province east of Colón, word-initial [h] (phonemically /x/) is actually pronounced in several words such as hondo [ˈhondo] 'deep' or harto [ˈhaɾto] 'fed up'. This is related to the historical aspiration and eventual loss of Latin f in Spanish. In a few areas, this [h] kept being pronounced in some words.

In at least the Costa Arriba, /ʝ/ is rendered as a fricative [ʝ] (rather than an approximant [ʝ˕], which is more common in other dialects) or often the corresponding affricate [ɟʝ], and almost never being elided.

Syllable-final /f, p, b, t, d, k, g/ are often elided. Syllable-final /f/ is often converted to a simple aspirate [h], while /p, b/ may be backed to a velar approximant [ɣ]. The same happens to /t/, although it's more common for /t/ to become [ð], and the most common option is for /t/ to simply be deleted.

The /x/ is realized as glottal [h], as in Caribbean and other American Spanish dialects, Canarian, and Andalusian Spanish dialects.

== Grammar ==
Rural Panamanian Spanish has a few grammatical forms which are often considered to be archaisms. These were once more common, but have fallen into disuse in 'standard' Spanish. In the Costa Arriba of Colón Province, some verbs are found with prothetic vowels and prefixes: arrecordar for recordar 'remember', entodavía for todavía, arrebuscar for rebuscar 'look for'. Also, cualquiera 'any' can be used as an adjective, as in cualquiera persona 'anyone', and the term algotro 'some other' is still used. Rural western Panama has more forms considered archaic.

== Vocabulary ==
Lexically, Panamanian Spanish presents a variety of new terms introduced and being incorporated into the daily language all the time. The following quotation shows some common Panamanian expressions:

"Vecina, yo no soy vidajena, y no me gusta esa vaina ... pero te voy a contar un bochinche...

pero si me das de comer un poco de chicheme, concolón, carimañola, sancocho y mondongo... Ese man flacuchento y ñato vestido de guayabera azul y sombrero montuno que viene allí ... Su motete ya no tiene ñame, guineo ni guandú. Lo que tiene es un pocotón de chécheres. Según la comadre fula radiobemba, el cambio en ese lapé no se debe a una macuá ..."

[Note: lapé = pelao ('boy') (vesre)]

Panamanians sometimes use loanwords from English, partly due to the prolonged existence of the Panama Canal Zone. Examples are breaker (from circuit breaker) instead of the Spanish interruptor, switch (from light switch) instead of the Spanish interruptor, fren (from friend) instead of Spanish amigo or amiga (this term is used in a unisex way), ok (from okay) instead of the Spanish vale, and so on. Many of these quotes and phrases are based in the Macaronic language presented in Panamanian slang.

== Bibliography ==
- Lipski, John M. (1989). The speech of the negros congos of Panama. Creole Language Library. Vol. 4. Amsterdam: John Benjamins. doi:10.1075/cll.4. ISBN 9789027252241.
- Lipski, John M. (1994). Latin American Spanish. London: Longman. ISBN 9780582087613.
