= San Carlos, Panamá Oeste =

San Carlos
- Corregimiento
- Location within Panama
- Coordinates: 8.4800°N 79.9494°W
- Country: Panama
- Province: Panamá Oeste
- District: San Carlos

Area
  - Land: 29.2 km^{2} (11.3 sq mi)

Population (2010)
  - Total: 3,578
  - Density: 122.6/km^{2} (318/sq mi)
- Population density calculated based on land area.
- Time zone: UTC−5 (EST)
- Climate: Aw

San Carlos is a corregimiento in San Carlos District, Panamá Oeste Province, Panama with a population of 3,578 as of 2010. It is the seat of San Carlos District. Its population as of 1990 was 2,029; its population as of 2000 was 2,783.
