= Santa Rita, Panamá Oeste =

Santa Rita
- Corregimiento
- Location within Panama
- Coordinates: 8.8606°N 79.8792°W
- Country: Panama
- Province: Panamá Oeste
- District: La Chorrera

Area
  - Land: 32.3 km^{2} (12.5 sq mi)

Population (2010)
  - Total: 1,848
  - Density: 57.2/km^{2} (148/sq mi)
- Population density calculated based on land area.
- Time zone: UTC−5 (EST)

Santa Rita is a corregimiento in La Chorrera District, Panamá Oeste Province, Panama with a population of 1,848 as of 2010. Its population as of 1990 was 1,191; its population as of 2000 was 1,307.
