= Punta Chame =

- Corregimiento
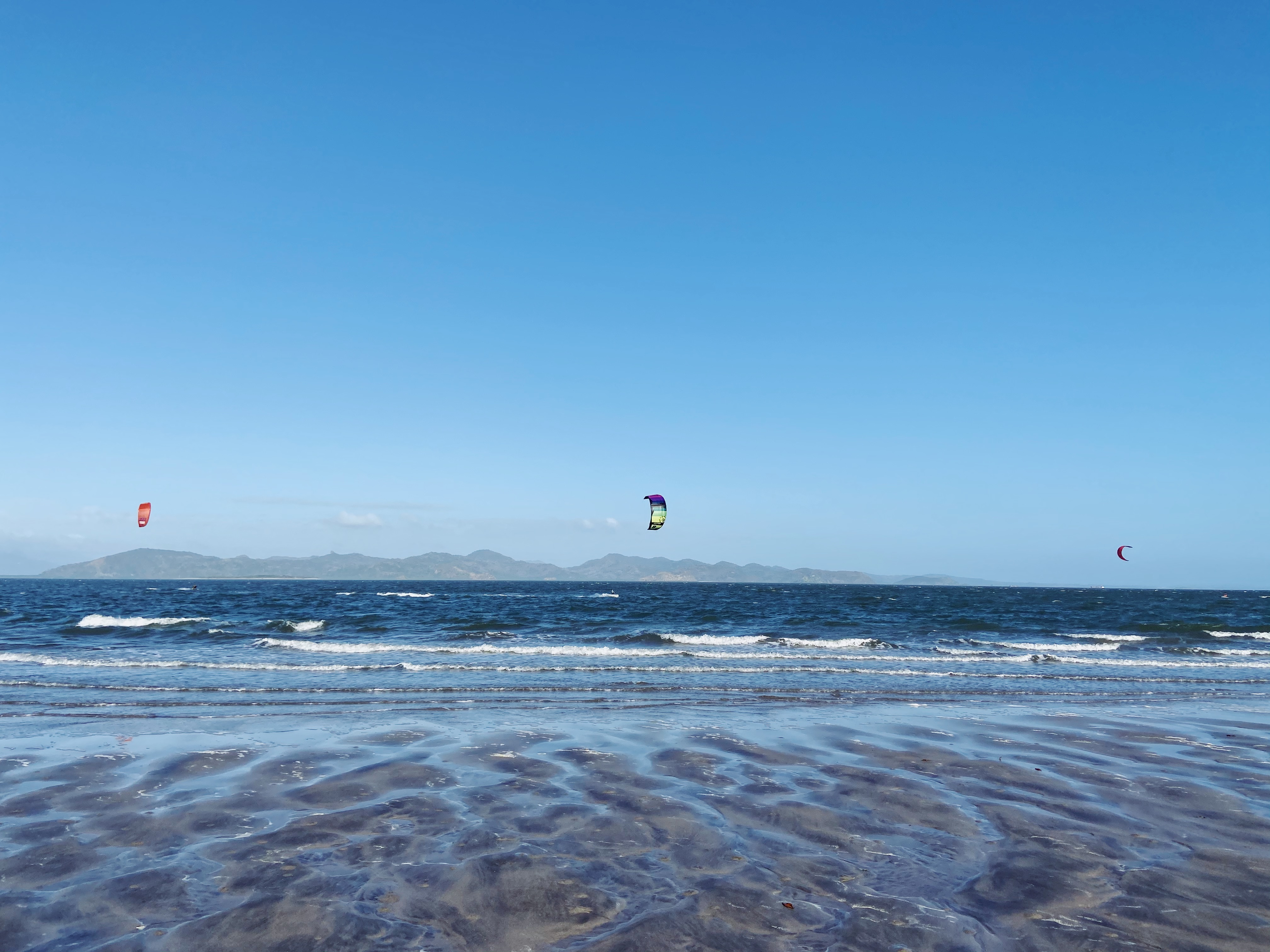
- Beach in Punta Chame
- Interactive map of Punta Chame
- Location within Panama
- Coordinates: 8.6500°N 79.7000°W
- Country: Panama
- Province: Panamá Oeste
- District: Chame

Area
  - Land: 16.6 km^{2} (6.4 sq mi)

Population (2023)
  - Total: 477
  - Density: 28.8/km^{2} (75/sq mi)
- Population density calculated based on land area.
- Time zone: UTC−5 (EST)

Punta Chame is a corregimiento in Chame District, Panamá Oeste Province, Panama with a population of 477 as of 2023. Its population as of 2010 was 443; its population as of 2000 was 375. Its population as of 1990 was 294.

There are three settlements in the corregimiento: Punta Chame, Claridad, and Playa Caracol.
