= Sioguí Arriba =

- Location within Panama
- Coordinates: 8°31′48″N 82°40′48″W
- Country: Panama
- Province: Chiriquí

Population (2008)
  - Total: 1 229
- Climate: Am

Sioguí Arriba is a town in the Chiriquí province of Panama.

== Sources ==
- World Gazetteer: Panama – World-Gazetteer.com
