= Finca Cincuenta y Uno =

- Interactive map of Finca Cincuenta y Uno
- Location within Panama
- Coordinates: 9°29′N 82°41′W
- Country: Panama
- Province: Bocas del Toro

Population (2008)
  - Total: 1,115

Finca Cincuenta y Uno is a town in the Bocas del Toro Province of Panama.
