= Berbá =

- Location within Panama
- Coordinates: 8°21′0″N 82°45′0″W
- Country: Panama
- Province: Chiriquí

Population (2008)
  - Total: 1 050
- Climate: Am

Berbá is a town in the Chiriquí province of Panama.

== Sources ==
- World Gazeteer: Panama – World-Gazetteer.com
