= Chame District =

- District

- Location of the district capital in Panama
- Coordinates: 8°34′48″N 79°52′12″W
- Country: Panama
- Province: Panamá Oeste
- Capital: Chame

Area
  - Total: 377 km^{2} (146 sq mi)

Population (2019)
  - Total: 31,373
- official estimate
- Time zone: UTC-5 (ETZ)

Chame is a district (distrito) of Panamá Oeste Province in Panama. The population according to the 2000 census was 19,625; the latest official estimate (for 2019) is 31,373. The district covers a total area of 377 km^{2}. The capital lies at the city of Chame.

== Administrative divisions ==
Chame District is divided administratively into the following corregimientos:

- Chame (capital)
- Bejuco
- Buenos Aires
- Cabuya
- Chicá
- El Líbano
- Las Lajas
- Nueva Gorgona
- Punta Chame
- Sajalices
- Sorá
