= El Espino, Panama =

El Espino
- Corregimiento
- Location within Panama
- Coordinates: 8°29′03″N 80°01′09″W
- Country: Panama
- Province: Panamá Oeste
- District: San Carlos

Area
  - Land: 34.9 km^{2} (13.5 sq mi)

Population (2010)
  - Total: 1,847
  - Density: 52.9/km^{2} (137/sq mi)
- Population density calculated based on land area.
- Time zone: UTC−5 (EST)

El Espino is a corregimiento in San Carlos District, Panamá Oeste Province, Panama with a population of 1,847 as of 2010. Its population as of 1990 was 1,200; its population as of 2000 was 1,451.
