= Entradero =

- Location within Panama
- Coordinates: 8°34′12″N 80°13′12″W
- Country: Panama
- Province: Coclé

Population (2008)
  - Total: 1 121

Entradero is a town in the Coclé province of Panama.

== Sources ==
- World Gazeteer: Panama – World-Gazetteer.com
