= Chame, Panama =

Chame
- Town and corregimiento
- Location within Panama
- Coordinates: 8°34′48″N 79°52′12″W
- Country: Panama
- Province: Panamá Oeste
- District: Chame

Area
  - Land: 31.2 km^{2} (12.0 sq mi)

Population (2010)
  - Total: 2,432
  - Density: 78.1/km^{2} (202/sq mi)
- Population density calculated based on land area.
- Time zone: UTC−5 (EST)

Chame is a town and corregimiento in Chame District, Panamá Oeste Province, Panama with a population of 2,432 as of 2010. It is the seat of Chame District. Its population as of 1990 was 1,822; its population as of 2000 was 2,195.
