= Quebrada Bonita Adentro =

- Location within Panama
- Coordinates: 9°18′0″N 79°42′0″W
- Country: Panama
- Province: Colón

Population (2008)
  - Total: 2 014

Quebrada Bonita Adentro is a town in the Colón province of Panama.

== Sources ==
- World Gazetteer: Panama – World-Gazetteer.com
