= Amador, Panama =

Amador
- Corregimiento
- Location within Panama
- Coordinates: 9°04′46″N 79°54′50″W
- Country: Panama
- Province: Panamá Oeste
- District: La Chorrera

Area
  - Land: 131.1 km^{2} (50.6 sq mi)

Population (2010)
  - Total: 2,996
  - Density: 22.9/km^{2} (59/sq mi)
- Population density calculated based on land area.
- Time zone: UTC−5 (EST)

Amador is a corregimiento in La Chorrera District, Panamá Oeste Province, Panama with a population of 2,996 as of 2010. Its population as of 1990 was 1,925; its population as of 2000 was 2,675.
