= El Cacao, Panamá Oeste =

El Cacao
- Corregimiento
- Location within Panama
- Coordinates: 8.7667°N 80.0167°W
- Country: Panama
- Province: Panamá Oeste
- District: Capira

Area
  - Land: 177.1 km^{2} (68.4 sq mi)

Population (2010)
  - Total: 4,951
  - Density: 28/km^{2} (73/sq mi)
- Population density calculated based on land area.
- Time zone: UTC−5 (EST)

El Cacao is a corregimiento in Capira District, Panamá Oeste Province, Panama with a population of 4,951 as of 2010. Its population as of 1990 was 4,042; its population as of 2000 was 4,387.
