= La Cabima =

- Location within Panama
- Coordinates: 9°7′48″N 79°31′48″W
- Country: Panama
- Province: Panamá

Population (2008)
  - Total: 21 077

La Cabima is a town in the Panamá Province of Panama.

== Sources ==
- World Gazeteer: Panama – World-Gazetteer.com
