= Churuquita Grande =

- Location within Panama
- Coordinates: 8°36′0″N 80°16′12″W
- Country: Panama
- Province: Coclé

Population (2008)
  - Total: 1 878

Churuquita Grande is a town in the Coclé province of Panama.

The area around Churuquita Grande is quite varied. The highest point in the area is 420 meters high and 2.9 km west of Churuquita Grande. There are about 48 people per square kilometer around the relatively small population of Churuquita Grande. The nearest larger city is Penonomé, 13.4 km southwest of Churuquita Grande. The countryside around Churuquita Grande is almost completely covered.

== Sources ==
- World Gazeteer: Panama – World-Gazetteer.com
