= El Espavé =

- Location within Panama
- Coordinates: 8°55′48″N 79°50′24″W
- Country: Panama
- Province: Panamá

Population (2008)
  - Total: 1 144

El Espavé is a town in the Panamá Province of Panama.

== Sources ==
- World Gazeteer: Panama – World-Gazetteer.com
