= Gariché =

- Location within Panama
- Coordinates: 8°28′48″N 82°46′48″W
- Country: Panama
- Province: Chiriquí Province

Population (2008)
  - Total: 1 003
- Climate: Am

Gariché is a town in the Chiriquí province of Western Panama.

== Sources ==
- World Gazeteer: Panama – World-Gazetteer.com
