= Sioguí Abajo =

- Location within Panama
- Coordinates: 8°30′0″N 82°40′12″W
- Country: Panama
- Province: Chiriquí

Population (2008)
  - Total: 2 982
- Climate: Am

Sioguí Abajo is a town in the Chiriquí province of Panama.

== Sources ==
- World Gazetteer: Panama – World-Gazetteer.com
