= Lídice =

Town in Panamá Oeste, Panama

- Corregimiento
- Location within Panama
- Coordinates: 8°45′0″N 79°54′0″W
- Country: Panama
- Province: Panamá Oeste
- District: Capira

Area
  - Land: 42.6 km^{2} (16.4 sq mi)

Population (2010)
  - Total: 5,307
  - Density: 124.5/km^{2} (322/sq mi)
- Population density calculated based on land area.
- Time zone: UTC−5 (EST)

Lídice is a town and corregimiento in Capira District, Panamá Oeste Province, Panama with a population of 5,307 as of 2010. Its population as of 1990 was 3,840; its population as of 2000 was 4,711.

The town was renamed on 31 October 1943, from Potrero, to commemorate the town of Lidice in the Protectorate of Bohemia and Moravia (the Czech Republic today) which was razed to the ground, and its population murdered by the SS on 10 June 1942 as a retribution for the assassination of Reinhard Heydrich, a highly ranked official.
