= Cermeño =

- Corregimiento
- Location within Panama
- Coordinates: 8°43′48″N 79°51′0″W
- Country: Panama
- Province: Panamá Oeste
- District: Capira

Area
  - Land: 94 km^{2} (36 sq mi)

Population (2010)
  - Total: 1,946
  - Density: 20.7/km^{2} (54/sq mi)
- Population density calculated based on land area.
- Time zone: UTC−5 (EST)

Cermeño is a corregimiento in Capira District, Panamá Oeste Province, Panama with a population of 1,946 as of 2010. Its population as of 1990 was 1,511; its population as of 2000 was 1,830.
