= Puerto Caimito =

- Town and corregimiento
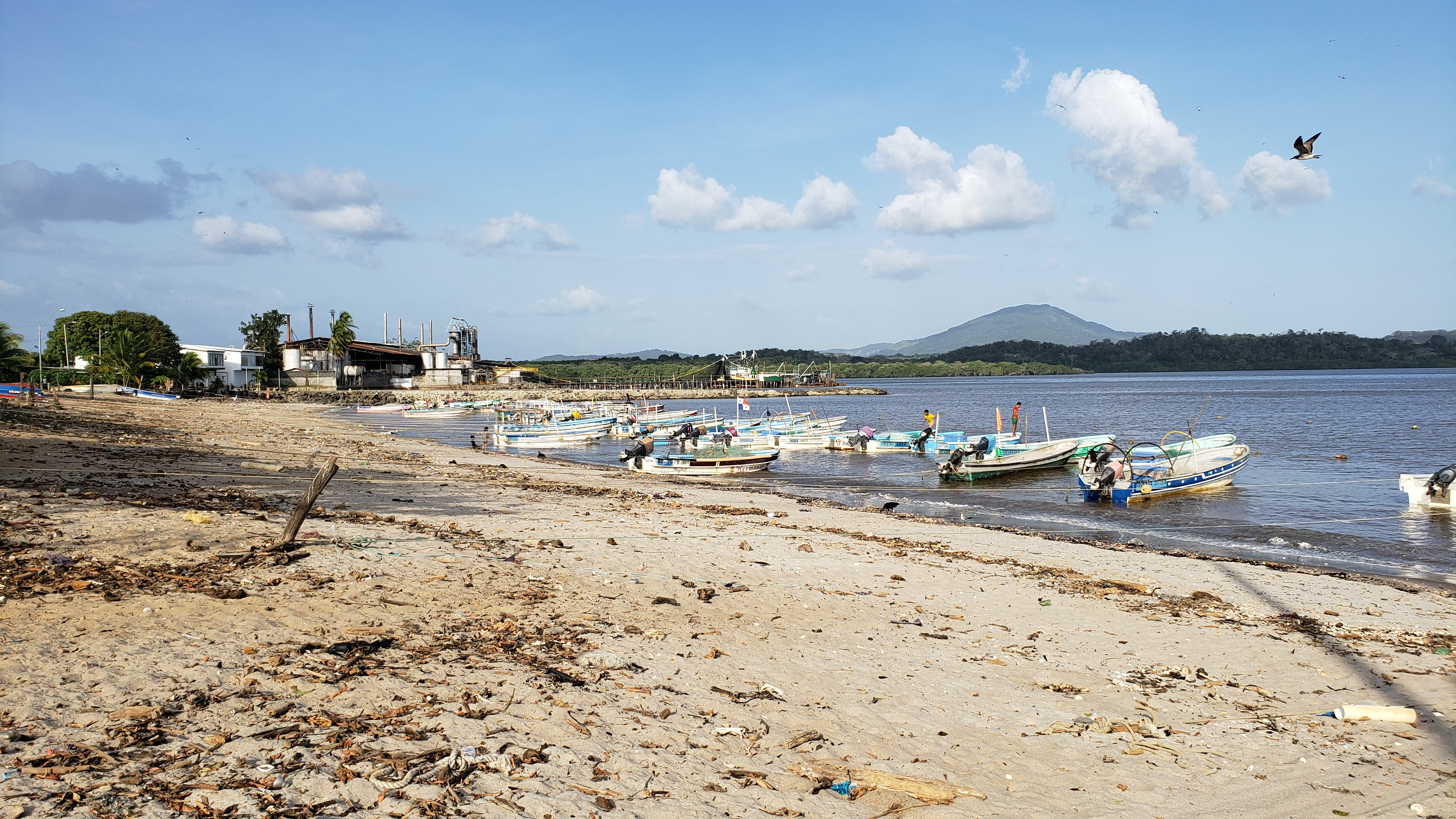
- High tide at the beach in Puerto Caimito

- Location within Panama
- Coordinates: 8°52′12″N 79°43′12″W
- Country: Panama
- Province: Panamá Oeste
- District: La Chorrera

Area
  - Land: 31.6 km^{2} (12.2 sq mi)

Population (2010)
  - Total: 16,951
  - Density: 535.6/km^{2} (1,387/sq mi)
- Population density calculated based on land area.
- Time zone: UTC−5 (EST)

Puerto Caimito is a town and corregimiento in La Chorrera District, Panamá Oeste Province, Panama with a population of 16,951 as of 2010. Its population as of 1990 was 3,623; its population as of 2000 was 7,198. It was the boyhood home of New York Yankees relief pitcher Mariano Rivera.
