= Celmira =

- Location within Panama
- Coordinates: 8°31′48″N 82°48′0″W
- Country: Panama
- Province: Chiriquí

Population (2008)
  - Total: 1 058
- Climate: Am

Celmira is a town in the Chiriquí province of Panama.

== Sources ==
- World Gazeteer: Panama – World-Gazetteer.com
