= Alto de la Estancia =

- Location within Panama
- Coordinates: 8°36′0″N 80°10′12″W
- Country: Panama
- Province: Coclé

Population (2008)
  - Total: 1 204

Alto de la Estancia is a town in the Coclé province of Panama.

== Sources ==
- World Gazeteer: Panama – World-Gazetteer.com
