= Mata del Nance =

- Location within Panama
- Coordinates: 8°27′0″N 82°24′0″W
- Country: Panama
- Province: Chiriquí

Population (2008)
  - Total: 1 172

Mata del Nance is a small town in the Chiriquí province of Panama.

== Sources ==
- World Gazetteer: Panama – World-Gazetteer.com
