= Llano Marín =

- Location within Panama
- Coordinates: 8°30′0″N 80°19′48″W
- Country: Panama
- Province: Coclé

Population (2008)
  - Total: 1 408

Llano Marín is a town in the Coclé province of Panama. Llano Marín is located 76 meters above sea level and has a population of 1264 inhabitants.

The terrain around Llano Marín is flat to the south, but rugged to the north. The highest point in the area is 355 meters high and 3.7 km north of Llano Marín. There are about 70 people per square kilometer around the relatively sparsely populated Llano Marín. The nearest larger city is Penonomé, 3.4 km northwest of Llano Marín. The countryside around Llano Marín is almost completely covered.

== Sources ==
- World Gazeteer: Panama – World-Gazetteer.com
