= Churuquita Chiquita =

- Location within Panama
- Coordinates: 8°34′12″N 80°16′48″W
- Country: Panama
- Province: Coclé

Population (2008)
  - Total: 1 273

Churuquita Chiquita is a town in the Coclé province of Panama. At 166 meters above sea level it is located in Churuquita Chiquita and has 1,142 inhabitants according to the 2010 census.

== Sources ==
- World Gazeteer: Panama – World-Gazetteer.com
