= Capetí =

- Location within Panama
- Coordinates: 8°4′48″N 77°34′48″W
- Country: Panama
- Province: Darién

Population (2008)
  - Total: 957

Capetí is a town in the Darién province of Panama.

== Sources ==
- World Gazeteer: Panama – World-Gazetteer.com
