= Nuevo Vigía =

- Location within Panama
- Coordinates: 9°14′24″N 79°36′36″W
- Country: Panama
- Province: Colón

Population (2008)
  - Total: 2 411

Nuevo Vigía is a town in the Colón province of Panama.

== Sources ==
- World Gazetteer: Panama – World-Gazetteer.com

population 3
