= Nueva Gorgona =

- Town and corregimiento
- Location within Panama
- Coordinates: 8°33′0″N 79°52′12″W
- Country: Panama
- Province: Panamá Oeste
- District: Chame

Area
  - Land: 19.9 km^{2} (7.7 sq mi)

Population (2010)
  - Total: 4,075
  - Density: 204.9/km^{2} (531/sq mi)
- Population density calculated based on land area.
- Time zone: UTC−5 (EST)

Nueva Gorgona is a town and corregimiento in Chame District, Panamá Oeste Province, Panama with a population of 4,075 as of 2010. Its population as of 1990 was 1,980; its population as of 2000 was 3,140.

Nueva Gorgona is 79 km west from Panama City on the Pan American Highway (about one hour drive). It is located between the towns of Chame and Coronado, 5 minute drive from either town. Gorgona's beaches and proximity to Panama city have attracted interest from developers. Gorgona has 4.2 km long beach with white / black sand and turquoise waters. Gorgona possesses one of the best surfing beaches (Malibu) in the area, and a fish market. The beach is mostly calm, but can have an undertow in some areas.

It has become a tourist destination for locals and ex-pats as described in more detail in WikiVoyage.
