= Capira District =

Capira
- District

- Location of the district capital in Panama
- Coordinates: 8°45′0″N 79°52′12″W
- Country: Panama
- Province: Panamá Oeste
- Capital: Capira

Area
  - Total: 978 km^{2} (378 sq mi)

Population (2019)
  - Total: 47,244
- official estimate
- Time zone: UTC-5 (ETZ)

Capira is a district (distrito) of West Panamá Province in Panama. The population according to the 2000 census was 33,110; the latest official estimate (for 2019) is 47,244. The district covers a total area of 978 km^{2}. The capital is the city of Capira.

== Administrative divisions ==
Capira District is divided administratively into the following corregimientos:

- Capira (capital)
- Caimito
- Campana
- Cermeño
- Cirí de Los Sotos
- Cirí Grande
- El Cacao
- La Trinidad
- Las Ollas Arriba
- Lídice
- Villa Carmen
- Villa Rosario
- Santa Rosa
