= Nuevo San Juan =

- Location within Panama
- Coordinates: 9°13′12″N 79°39′36″W
- Country: Panama
- Province: Colón

Population (2008)
  - Total: 1 373

Nuevo San Juan is a town in the Colón province of Panama.

== Sources ==
- World Gazetteer: Panama – World-Gazetteer.com
