= Espinillo =

Espinillo may refer to:

- Prosopis affinis or Espinillo, a species of flowering tree
- Espinillo, Chile, a village in Pichilemu, Chile
  - Escuela Espinillo, a school in Cardenal Caro
- El Espinillo, Chaco, a settlement in Chaco Province, Argentina
- El Espinillo, Formosa, capital of the Pilagás Department, in Formosa Province, Argentina
