= Santa Rita Arriba =

- Location within Panama
- Coordinates: 9°20′24″N 79°46′48″W
- Country: Panama
- Province: Colón

Population (2008)
  - Total: 2 184

Santa Rita Arriba is a town in the Colón province of Panama. This locality has a particular tropical forest and mountainous ecosystem; with elevation of 200 m above sea level. It is near the Panama Canal lakes and the Trinidad River. The area holds an important diversity of insects, and as a result, recently has been described a new rare moth of the genus Pavolechia.

== Sources ==
- World Gazetteer: Panama – World-Gazetteer.com
- Heppner, J.B. and Corro-Chang, P. 2017. Panama moth notes, The Neotropical Genus Pavolechia (Lepidoptera: Gelechiidae: Anacampsinae). Lepidoptera Novae, 10(1–2): 67–70.
