= Los Boquerones =

- Location within Panama
- Coordinates: 8°4′48″N 80°51′0″W
- Country: Panama
- Province: Veraguas

Population (2008)
  - Total: 1 157

Los Boquerones is a town in the Veraguas province of Panama.

== Sources ==
- World Gazetteer: Panama – World-Gazetteer.com
