= Coloncito, Panama =

Coloncito
- Location within Panama
- Coordinates: 8°34′12″N 79°54′0″W
- Country: Panama
- Province: Panamá Oeste

Population (2008)
  - Total: 1 023

Coloncito is a town in the Panamá Oeste Province of Panama.

== Sources ==
- World Gazeteer: Panama – World-Gazetteer.com
