= Boca de Parita =

- Location within Panama
- Coordinates: 8°1′12″N 80°27′0″W
- Country: Panama
- Province: Herrera

Population (2008)
  - Total: 1 167

Boca de Parita is a town in the Herrera Province of Panama.

== Sources ==
- World Gazeteer: Panama – World-Gazetteer.com
