= La Trinidad, Panama =

La Trinidad
- Corregimiento
- Location within Panama
- Country: Panama
- Province: Panamá Oeste
- District: Capira

Area
  - Land: 107 km^{2} (41 sq mi)

Population (2010)
  - Total: 2,572
  - Density: 24/km^{2} (62/sq mi)
- Population density calculated based on land area.
- Time zone: UTC−5 (EST)

La Trinidad is a corregimiento in Capira District, Panamá Oeste Province, Panama with a population of 2,572 as of 2010. Its population as of 1990 was 2,160; its population as of 2000 was 2,287.
