= La Mitra =

- Location within Panama
- Coordinates: 8°50′24″N 79°47′24″W
- Country: Panama
- Province: Panamá

Population (2008)
  - Total: 5 326

La Mitra is a town in the Panamá Province of Panama. The town is located southwest of Panama City, off the Carretera Panamericana (Pan-American Highway). in the central part of the country, 30 km southwest of Panama, the capital. 92 meters above sea level is located in La Mitra and has 4,778 inhabitants.

== Sources ==
- World Gazeteer: Panama – World-Gazetteer.com
