= Villa Rosario =

- Corregimiento
- Location within Panama
- Coordinates: 8°46′48″N 79°52′12″W
- Country: Panama
- Province: Panamá Oeste
- District: Capira

Area
  - Land: 26 km^{2} (10 sq mi)

Population (2010)
  - Total: 4,496
  - Density: 173.2/km^{2} (449/sq mi)
- Population density calculated based on land area.
- Time zone: UTC−5 (EST)

Villa Rosario is a corregimiento in Capira District, Panamá Oeste Province, Panama with a population of 4,496 as of 2010. Its population as of 1990 was 2,363; its population as of 2000 was 3,214.
