= Vacamonte =

- Corregimiento
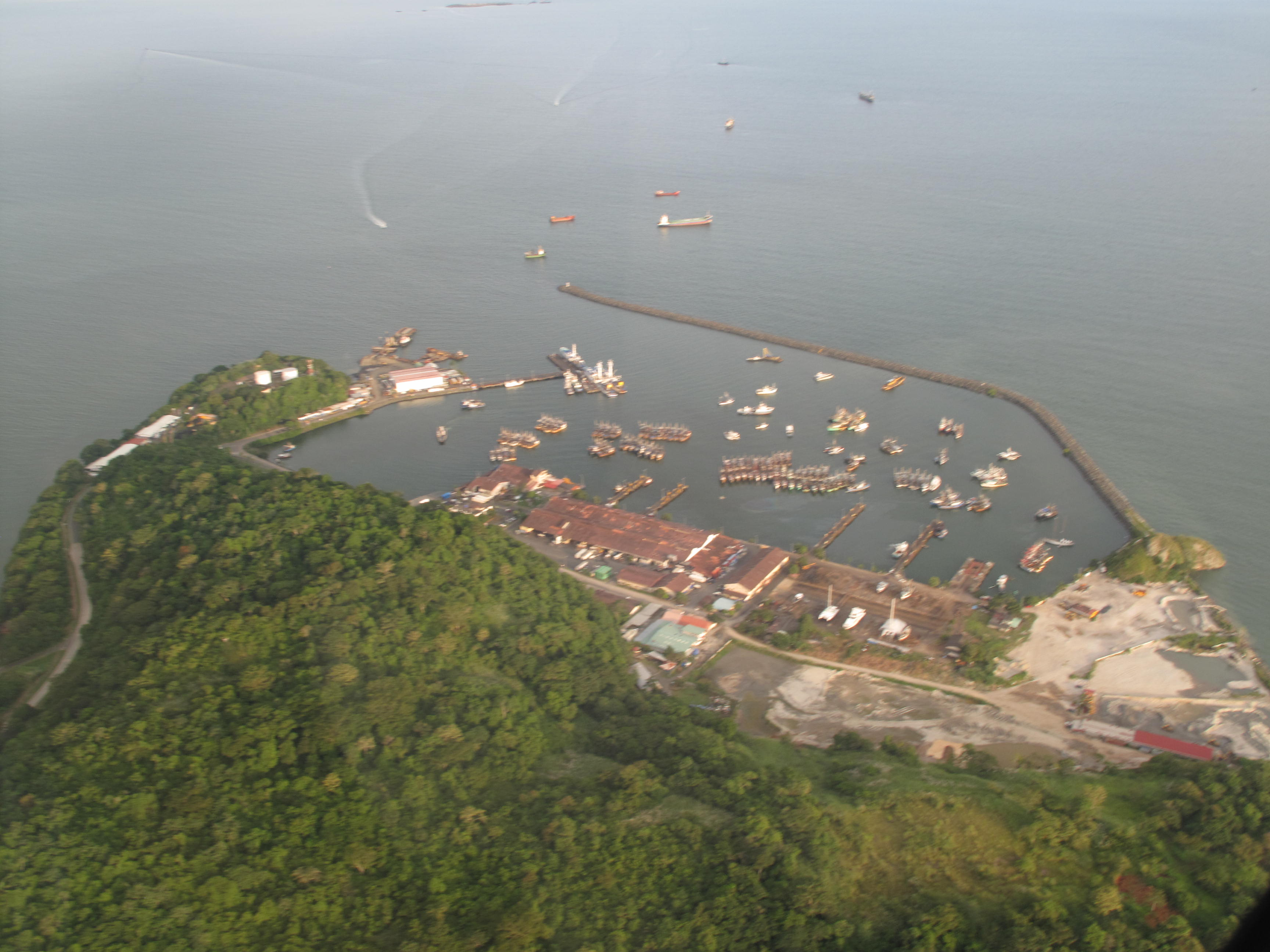

- Location within Panama
- Coordinates: 8.9149°N 79.7020°W
- Country: Panama
- Province: Panamá Oeste
- District: Chorrera

Government
  - Representative democracy: José Enrique Pérez

Area
  - Land: 20.5 km^{2} (7.9 sq mi)

Population (2023)
  - Total: 46,597
  - Density: 2,476/km^{2} (6,410/sq mi)
- Population density calculated based on land area.
- Time zone: UTC−5 (EST)

Vacamonte is a place in the Arraiján District in the Panamá Oeste Province in Panama. In 2023 the population was 46,597.
