= Santa Ana Arriba =

- Location within Panama
- Coordinates: 7°55′48″N 80°22′12″W
- Country: Panama
- Province: Los Santos

Population (2008)
  - Total: 1 097

Santa Ana Arriba is a town in the Los Santos province of Panama.

== Sources ==
- World Gazetteer: Panama – World-Gazetteer.com
