= Río Duque =

- Location within Panama
- Coordinates: 9°16′12″N 79°40′48″W
- Country: Panama
- Province: Colón

Population (2008)
  - Total: 1 300

Río Duque is a town in the Colón province of Panama.

== Sources ==
- World Gazetteer: Panama
