= Chigoré =

- Location within Panama
- Coordinates: 8°31′48″N 80°21′0″W
- Country: Panama
- Province: Coclé

Population (2008)
  - Total: 2 466

Chigoré is located in the province of Coclé, in the central part of the country, 100 km southwest of Panama, the country's capital. At 70 meters above sea level it is located in Chigoré and has 2,212 inhabitants.

The land around Chigoré is flat to the southwest, but to the northeast it is mountainous. The highest point in the area is 355 meters high and 2.7 km east of Chigoré. There are about 43 people per square kilometer around the relatively small town of Chigoré. The nearest larger city is Penonomé 1.4 km southwest of Chigoré. The countryside around Chigoré is almost completely covered.

== Sources ==
- World Gazeteer: Panama – World-Gazetteer.com
