= Villa Carmen, Panama =

Villa Carmen
- Corregimiento
- Location within Panama
- Coordinates: 8°48′0″N 79°52′12″W
- Country: Panama
- Province: Panamá Oeste
- District: Capira

Area
  - Land: 6.4 km^{2} (2.5 sq mi)

Population (2010)
  - Total: 1,352
  - Density: 210.5/km^{2} (545/sq mi)
- Population density calculated based on land area.
- Time zone: UTC−5 (EST)

Villa Carmen is a corregimiento in Capira District, Panamá Oeste Province, Panama with a population of 1,352 as of 2010. Its population as of 1990 was 956; its population as of 2000 was 1,287.
