= La Tronosa =

Coordinates: 7.4333°N 80.5833°W

- Corregimiento
- Location within Panama
- Country: Panama
- Province: Los Santos
- District: Tonosí

Area
  - Land: 86.4 km^{2} (33.4 sq mi)

Population (2010)
  - Total: 637
  - Density: 7.4/km^{2} (19/sq mi)
- Population density calculated based on land area.
- Time zone: UTC−5 (EST)

La Tronosa is a corregimiento in Tonosí District, Los Santos Province, Panama with a population of 637 as of 2010. Its population as of 1990 was 721; its population as of 2000 was 668.
