= El Cortezo, Coclé =

El Cortezo
- Location within Panama
- Coordinates: 8°21′0″N 80°36′0″W
- Country: Panama
- Province: Coclé

Population (2008)
  - Total: 1 230

El Cortezo is a town in the Coclé province of Panama.

== Sources ==
- World Gazeteer: Panama – World-Gazetteer.com
