= Los Pollos =

- Location within Panama
- Coordinates: 8°24′25.43881″N 80°9′24.364″W
- Country: Panama
- Province: Coclé

Government

Population (2008)
  - Total: 1 405

Los Pollos (transl. the chickens) is a town in the Coclé province of Panama.
