= Alto del Espino =

- Location within Panama
- Coordinates: 8°49′48″N 79°51′0″W
- Country: Panama
- Province: Panamá

Population (2008)
  - Total: 4,092

Alto del Espino is a town in the Panamá Province of Panama.

== Sources ==
- World Gazeteer: Panama – World-Gazetteer.com
