= Madungandí =

Guna de Madungandí
- Comarca indígena and corregimiento

- Location within Panama
- Country: Panama
- Province: Panamá
- District: Chepo
- Established: January 12, 1996

Area
  - Land: 2,075.9 km^{2} (801.5 sq mi)

Population (2010)
  - Total: 4,271
  - Density: 2.1/km^{2} (5.4/sq mi)
- Population density calculated based on land area.
- Time zone: UTC−5 (EST)

Guna de Madungandí or Madungandí, formerly known as Kuna de Madugandí is a comarca indígena (indigenous territory) and corregimiento in Chepo District, Panamá Province, Panama with a population of 4,271 as of 2010. It was created by Law 24 of January 12, 1996. Its population as of 2000 was 3,305.

The primary ethnicity is Guna.

The comarca is not divided into districts; but is divided into 12 communities: Akua Yala, Ibedí, Pintupu, Icandí, Piria, Cuinupdi, Nargandí, Ogobnawila, Diwar Sikua, Capandi and Tabardi. Its capital is Akua Yala.

Its area is 2318.8 km^{2} and is located near the Bayano River.

The leader of this region is known as Ariadna Alfonso. It is the most important sahila in the region.
