= Capira =

- Town and corregimiento
- Location within Panama
- Coordinates: 8°45′0″N 79°52′12″W
- Country: Panama
- Province: Panamá Oeste
- District: Capira

Area
  - Land: 45.6 km^{2} (17.6 sq mi)

Population (2010)
  - Total: 5,181
  - Density: 113.5/km^{2} (294/sq mi)
- Population density calculated based on land area.
- Time zone: UTC−5 (EST)

Capira is a town and corregimiento in Capira District, Panamá Oeste Province, Panama with a population of 5,181 as of 2010. It is the seat of Capira District. Its population as of 1990 was 3,606; its population as of 2000 was 4,553.
