= El Espino de Santa Rosa =

- Location within Panama
- Coordinates: 8°6′0″N 80°49′12″W
- Country: Panama
- Province: Veraguas

Population (2008)
  - Total: 1 168

El Espino de Santa Rosa is a town in the Veraguas province of Panama.

== Sources ==
- World Gazeteer: Panama – World-Gazetteer.com
