= Panamá Oeste Province =

Province of Panama

Panamá Oeste Province Provincia de Panamá Oeste
- Province
- Flag Seal

- Location of Panama Oeste Province in Panama
- Coordinates: 8°52′49″N 79°47′0″W
- Country: Panama
- Created: 1 January 2014
- Capital city: La Chorrera

Government
  - Governor: Marylin Vallarino

Area
  - Total: 2,786 km^{2} (1,076 sq mi)
- (9th)

Population (2023 census)
  - Total: 653,665 (2nd)
  - Density: 234.6/km^{2} (607.7/sq mi)

GDP (PPP, constant 2015 values)
  - Year: 2023
  - Total: $19.4 billion
  - Per capita: $33,200
- Time zone: UTC-5 (Eastern Time)
- ISO 3166 code: PA-10

Panamá Oeste (Spanish pronunciation: [panaˈma oˈeste]; English: West Panama) is the newest province in Panama.

It was created from the five districts of Panamá Province west of the Panama Canal on 1 January 2014. The capital is La Chorrera.

== Administrative divisions ==
Panamá Oeste Province is divided into 5 distritos (districts) and subdivided into 60 corregimientos.

District	Area (km^{2})	Population Census 2010	Population 2023 Census
Arraiján	418	230,311	299,079
Capira	978	41,179	45,629
Chame	377	26,185	28,535
La Chorrera	770	167,799	258,221
San Carlos	338	20,236	22,201

District	Corregimientos (Subdivisions)	Cabecera (Seat)
Arraiján District	Arraiján, Burunga, Cerro Silvestre, Juan Demóstenes Arosemena, Nuevo Emperador, Santa Clara, Vacamonte, Veracruz, Vista Alegre	Arraiján
Capira District	Capira, Caimito, Campana, Cermeño, Cirí de Los Sotos, Cirí Grande, El Cacao, La Trinidad, Las Ollas Arriba, Lídice, Santa Rosa, Villa Carmen, Villa Rosario	Capira
Chame District	Chame, Bejuco, Buenos Aires, Cabuya, Chicá, El Líbano, Las Lajas, Nueva Gorgona, Punta Chame, Sajalices, Sorá	Chame
La Chorrera District	La Chorrera, Barrio Balboa, Barrio Colón, Amador, Arosemena, El Arado, El Coco, Feuillet, Guadalupe, Herrera, Hurtado, Iturralde, La Represa, Los Díaz, Mendoza, Obaldía, Playa Leona, Puerto Caimito, Santa Rita	La Chorrera
San Carlos District	San Carlos, El Espino, El Higo, Guayabito, La Ermita, La Laguna, Las Uvas, Los Llanitos, San José	San Carlos
