= La Chorrera, Panama =

La Chorrera
- District
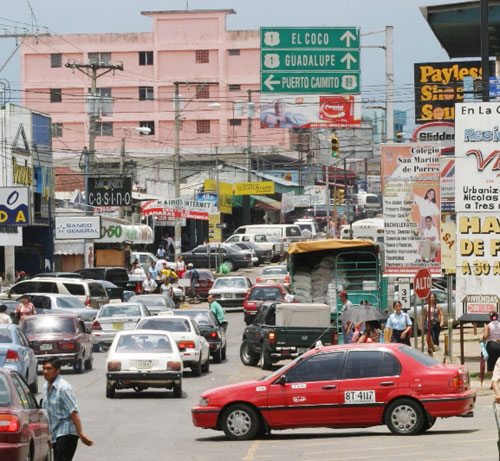

- Flag Coat of arms

- Location of the district capital in Panama
- Coordinates: 8°29′N 79°57′W
- Country: Panama
- Provincia: Panamá Oeste
- District: La Chorrera

Government
  - Mayor: Tomás Velásquez

Area
  - Total: 130 sq mi (337 km^{2})

Population (2010)
  - Total: 161,470
- Time zone: UTC-5 (ETZ)
- Climate: Aw

La Chorrera (Spanish pronunciation: [la tʃoˈreɾa]) is a city and municipality in central Panama, located about 30 km south-west of Panama City. It is the capital of the province of Panamá Oeste and one of the larger cities in the country and is fond of the phrase "La Bella, Enamoradora y Querendona, La Gran Chorrera", reportedly as a tribute to its beautiful women, kind people, and happy nightlife.

La Chorrera is renowned for its international fair and famous as being the home of Bollo and Chicheme. It is the home of San Francisco F.C., Mariano Rivera (five-time World Series champion with the New York Yankees), Vicente Mosquera (former World Boxing Champion), and José Luis Garcés.

== Geography and climate ==
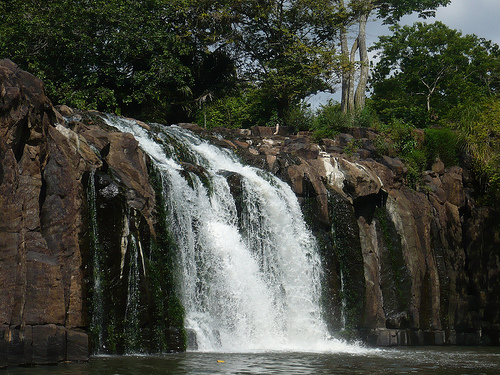
El Chorro of La Chorrera

La Chorrera has a warm tropical climate with heavy seasonal rains in the months of May to November, leading to extensive grasslands that favor the raising of cattle and to a lesser extent pigs.

The fertile lands yield good crops of pineapple, rice, coffee, oranges, cassava, beans and sugar cane. Approximately 2% of the country's lumber comes from this district.

Climate data for La Chorrera
Month	Jan	Feb	Mar	Apr	May	Jun	Jul	Aug	Sep	Oct	Nov	Dec	Year
Mean daily maximum °C (°F)	29.3 (84.7)	29.6 (85.3)	29.8 (85.6)	29.9 (85.8)	29.6 (85.3)	29.4 (84.9)	29.2 (84.6)	29.3 (84.7)	29.3 (84.7)	29.0 (84.2)	28.6 (83.5)	29.0 (84.2)	29.3 (84.8)
Daily mean °C (°F)	26.5 (79.7)	26.6 (79.9)	26.8 (80.2)	27.0 (80.6)	26.9 (80.4)	26.8 (80.2)	26.6 (79.9)	26.6 (79.9)	26.5 (79.7)	26.3 (79.3)	26.1 (79.0)	26.4 (79.5)	26.6 (79.9)
Mean daily minimum °C (°F)	24.5 (76.1)	24.5 (76.1)	24.6 (76.3)	25.0 (77.0)	25.2 (77.4)	25.0 (77.0)	24.9 (76.8)	24.9 (76.8)	24.8 (76.6)	24.7 (76.5)	24.5 (76.1)	24.7 (76.5)	24.8 (76.6)
Average precipitation mm (inches)	39.8 (1.57)	19.2 (0.76)	26.0 (1.02)	101.1 (3.98)	243.9 (9.60)	267.2 (10.52)	306.8 (12.08)	290.6 (11.44)	272.7 (10.74)	283.0 (11.14)	283.3 (11.15)	128.5 (5.06)	2,262.1 (89.06)
Source: Weather.Directory

== Location ==
La Chorrera is located on the Panamerican Highway between the districts of Capira and Arraiján, and is about 7 kilometers from the Pacific coast.

== History ==
The origin of the name of La Chorrera is not known with certainty, but it is assumed that it is due to the large number of waterfalls that exist, which include El Chorro de La Chorrera, El Chorro Trinidad, El Chorro de Caño Quebrada and others.

== Notable people ==
- Boris Alfaro, footballer
- Enrique Burgos, professional baseball player
- Serena ChaCha, drag queen
- Leroy Estrada, professional boxer
- Andrea Ferris, middle-distance runner
- José Luis Garcés, footballer
- Carmen Jaramillo, model
- Víctor Miranda, footballer
- Martín Morán, footballer
- Carlos Ortega, professional boxer
- Joaquín Riascos, politician and President of Colombia
- Rubén Rivera, professional baseball player
- Arístides Royo, politician and President of Panama
- Julio Segundo, footballer

== Villages ==
- Barrio Colón
