= Miss América Latina Organization =

The Organización Miss América Latina, known in English as the Miss Latin America Organization is a company that owns and organizes the Miss Latin America and Miss Latina US pageants. The organization was founded in the 1980s. The first pageant established was the Miss Latin America, in 1981. Miss Latina US was founded as Miss Latina USA in 1986, and is the official national preliminary for the United States to Miss Latin America. Miss Teen US Latina was founded in 2003.

== Titleholders ==
The following is a list of the titleholders for the Miss Latin America Organization, spanning back to Miss Latin America 1981.

Year	Name	Nationality	City	Country
1981	Lesley Quintanilla	United States	Miami, Florida	United States
1982	Martha Álvarez	United States	Miami, Florida	United States
1983	María Rosa	Puerto Rico	Miami, Florida	United States
1984	Mirla Ochoa	Venezuela	Miami, Florida	United States
1985	Victoria Mauríz	Dominican Republic	Miami, Florida	United States
1986	Lucia Collado	Dominican Republic	San José	Costa Rica
1987-1988 (Note: The 1988 event was postponed until 1989 because of the Mexican presidential inauguration, and thus Lorenia Burruel was named Miss América Latina 1987-88)	Lorenia Burruel	Mexico	Santa Cruz de la Sierra	Bolivia
1989	Suzanne Hannaux	El Salvador	Hermosillo, Sonora	Mexico
1990	Vanessa Holler	Venezuela	San Salvador	El Salvador
1991	María Elena Bellido	Peru	Buenos Aires	Argentina
1992	Ana Sofía Pereira	Nicaragua	Guayaquil	Ecuador
1993	María Fernanda Morales	Guatemala	Guatemala City	Guatemala
1994-1995 (Note: The 1995 event was canceled due to a national crisis in the host city. Priscila Furlan was then named Miss América Latina 1994-95.)	Priscila Furlan	Brazil	Guayaquil	Ecuador
1996-1997 (Note: The 1997 event was postponed for unknown reasons. Thus, Jeannette Chávez's title was extended to Miss América Latina 1996-97)	Jeannette Chávez	Costa Rica	Lima	Peru
1998-1999 (Note: The 1999 event was renamed to Miss América Latina 2000 in order to post-date the titles. Aline Resende's title was changed to Miss América Latina 1998-99.)	Aline Resende	Brazil	Costa del Sol	El Salvador
2000	Dania Prince	Honduras	Guatemala City	Guatemala
2001	Grace Martins	Brazil	Montelimar Beach	Nicaragua
2002	Claudia Cruz	Dominican Republic	Bávaro Beach	Dominican Republic
2003	Maria Carolina Casado	Venezuela	Playa Tambor	Costa Rica
2004	Gamalis Fermín	Puerto Rico	Cancún, Quintana Roo	Mexico
2005	Mariela Candia	Paraguay	Punta Cana	Dominican Republic
2006	Melissa Quesada	United States	Riviera Maya, Quintana Roo	Mexico
2007	Giannina Silva (dethroned)	Uruguay	Riviera Maya, Quintana Roo	Mexico
2007	Heidy García (successor)	Guatemala	Riviera Maya, Quintana Roo	Mexico
2008	Daniele Sampaio	Italy	Punta Cana	Dominican Republic
2009	Johanna Solano	Costa Rica	Punta Cana	Dominican Republic
2010	Carolina Lemus	Colombia	Punta Cana	Dominican Republic
2011	Estefani Chalco	Ecuador	Punta Cana	Dominican Republic
2012	Georgina Méndez	Guatemala	Playa del Carmen, Quintana Roo	Mexico
2013	Julia Guerra	Brazil	Riviera Maya, Quintana Roo	Mexico
2014	Nicole Pinto (resigned)	Panama	Punta Cana	Dominican Republic
2014	Yanire Ortiz (successor)	Spain	Punta Cana	Dominican Republic
2015	Karla Monje	United States	Riviera Maya, Quintana Roo	Mexico
2016	Laura Spoya	Peru	Riviera Maya, Quintana Roo	Mexico
2017	Elicena Andrada Orrego	Spain	Bahías de Huatulco, Oaxaca	Mexico
2018	Nadine Teresa Verhulp	Holland	Punta Cana	Dominican Republic

Year	Miss Latin America	Country Represented	Miss Latina US	State Represented	Miss Teen US Latina	State Represented
2008	Daniele Sampaio	Italy	Fatima Leonardo+	Rhode Island		
2007	Heidi Garcia *	Guatemala	Yalena Matos	Oregon	Nicole Korrody	Texas
2007	Giannina Silva *	Uruguay	Yalena Matos	Oregon	Nicole Korrody	Texas
2006	Melissa Quesada	United States	Melissa Marin	Rhode Island	Karla Acosta	Florida
2005	Mariela Candia	Paraguay	Melissa Quesada	New York	Geysha Gonzalez	Illinois
2004	Gamalis Fermín	Puerto Rico	Graciela Stanley	Kansas	Michelle Gonzalez	Illinois
2003	Maria Carolina Casado	Venezuela	Lydia Acuña	Utah	Edshelee Torres	Florida
2002	Claudia Cruz	Dominican Republic	Elynor Martinez	Utah		
2001	Grace Martins	Brazil	Karla Vargas	California		
2000	Dania Prince	Honduras	Katherine Gonzalez	New York		
1999	Aline Resende ***	Brazil	Dilania Inoa	Rhode Island	Kristine Taranco **	Florida
1998	Aline Resende ***	Brazil	Katherine Rodriguez	Florida		
1997	Jeannette Chavez ***	Costa Rica				
1996	Jeannette Chavez ***	Costa Rica	Iris Almario ****	New York		
1995	Priscila Furlan ***	Brazil				
1994	Priscila Furlan ***	Brazil	Joanne Morale-George	Florida		
1993	María Fernanda Morales	Guatemala	Dailin Garcia	Florida		
1992	Ana Sofía Pereira	Nicaragua	Carla Morales	Rhode Island		
1991	María Elena Bellido	Peru	Yvette Gonzalez	New York		
1990	Vanessa Holler	Venezuela	Carola Garfias	Arizona		
1989	Suzanne Hannaux	El Salvador	Hany Valdes	Florida		
1988	Lorenia Burruel ***	Mexico				
1987	Lorenia Burruel ***	Mexico	Sdenka Dobronic	District of Columbia		
1986	Lucia Collado	Dominican Republic	Sandra Luz Cedillos	Texas		
1985	Victoria Mauríz	Dominican Republic				
1984	Mirla Ochoa	Venezuela				
1983	María Rosa	Puerto Rico				
1982	Martha Alvarez	Miami, Florida, United States				
1981	Lesley Quintana	Miami, Florida, United States				

== Notes ==
* In 2007, Silva was dethroned by the Miss Latin America Organization and replaced by Garcia, the first runner-up.

** Taranco wasn't actually crowned Miss Teen US Latina, but rather won the title Miss Teen Florida Latina, the first teenage pageant associated with the Miss Latin America Organization.

*** For one various reason or another, Lorenia Burruel, Priscila Furlan, Jeannette Chavez, and Aline Resende had their titles expanded for another year.

**** No Miss Latina USA 1996 was organized. Rather, a panel of judges chose Iris Almario, the first runner-up at Miss Latina USA 1993, to represent the United States at Miss Latin America 1996.

+ Fatima Leonardo was selected to represent the United States at Miss Latin America 2008. She had won the state title for Rhode Island already, and was selected amongst those who were going to compete at Miss Latina US 2008, which had been postponed to after Miss Latin America 2008.
