= Aileen Bernal =

Miss International Panamá 2014

Ayleen Bernal
- Born: Aileen Haydee Bernal Ardines; August 19, 1994 (age 32); La Villa de Los Santos, Los Santos Province, Panama
- Height: 1.81 m (5 ft 11 1/2 in)
- Beauty pageant titleholder
- Title: Miss Los Santos 2014, Miss International Panamá 2014
- Hair color: Black
- Eye color: Black
- Major competitions: Miss Panamá 2014, Miss International Panamá 2014 (Winner), Miss International 2014 (Top 10)

Aileen Haydee Bernal Ardines (born 19 August 1994) is a Panamanian model and beauty pageant titleholder who was the winner of the Miss International Panamá 2014 title on July 13, 2014 for Miss International 2014 contest.

== Miss Panamá 2014 ==
Bernal is 5 ft 11 in (1.81 m) tall, and competed in the national beauty pageant Miss Panamá 2014. She represented the state of Los Santos.

== Miss International 2014 ==
She represented Panama in the 2014 Miss International pageant, held on November 11, 2014, in Tokyo, Japan, where she placed in the top 10.

Awards and achievements
Preceded by Sara Bello	Miss Los Santos; 2014–2015	Succeeded by Gladys Brandao
Preceded by Betzy Madrid	Miss International Panamá; 2014–2015	Succeeded by Jhasmeiry Herrera
