= Miss Latina Australia 2016 =

Beauty pageant

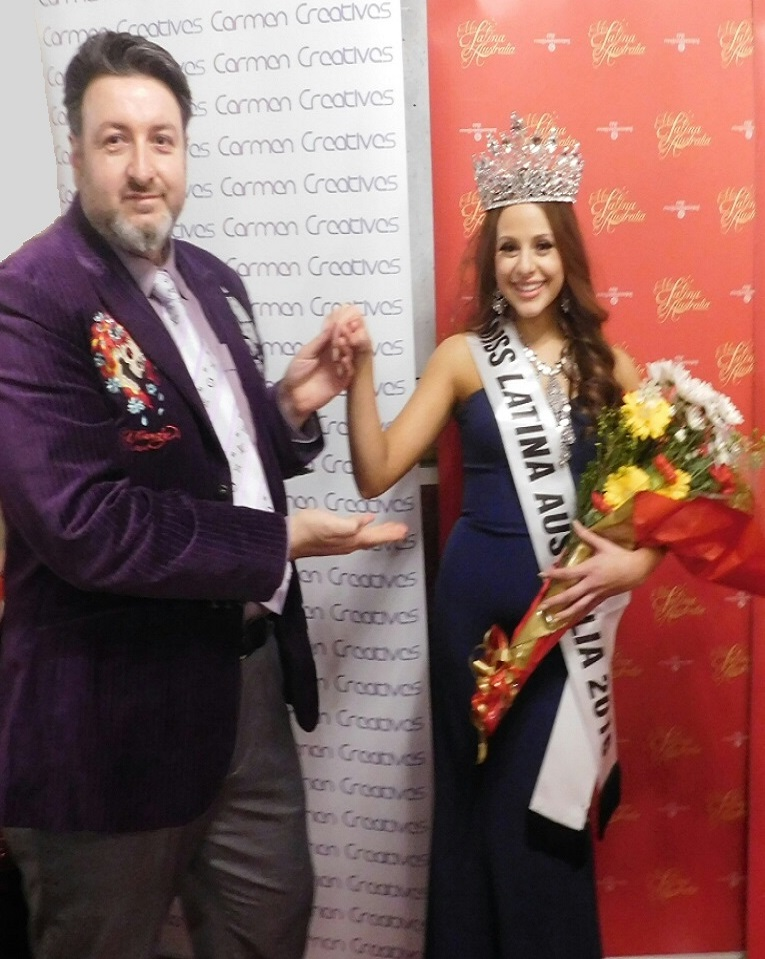
- Maurice Novoa presenting newly crowned Miss Latina Australia 2016 Georgette Psarreas for The Latin Australian Times National print edition newspaper
- Date: 9 July 2016
- Venue: The Regent Ballroom, Melbourne, Victoria
- Entrants: 12 finalists
- Winner: Georgette Psarreas

Miss Latina Australia 2016 was an Australian national beauty pageant run by E & E Events Management. It took place on July 23, 2016, in the historical Regent Ballroom in Northcote, Victoria. 12 finalists participated in the gala event. At the conclusion of the final event Georgette Psarreas (Chilean & Greek) was crowned Miss Latina Australia with Daniella Seoane (Uruguayan) second place and Miss charity. Jessica Bustamante (El Salvadorian) won title of people's choice, Tatiana Castiblanco (Colombian) winning Miss Photogenic. Miss América Latina international beauty contest was chosen for Georgette Psarreas to represent Australia and was flown all expenses paid to the Occidental Xcaret Resort in Mexico.

== History ==
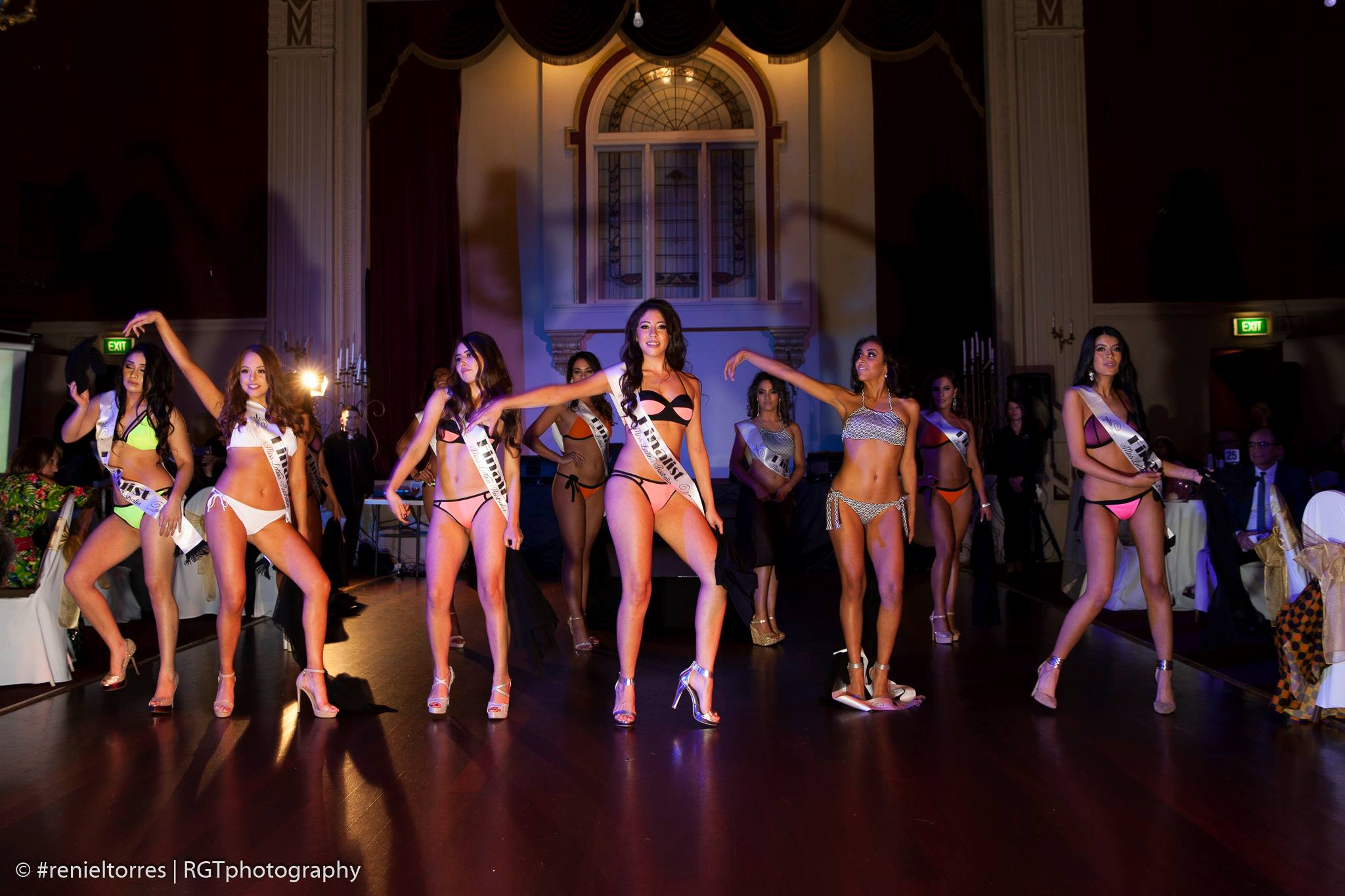
Miss Latina Australia 2016 pageant in the historical Regent Ballroom, Melbourne

Miss Latina Australia beauty pageant was first held at the Golden Star Receptions in Epping, Victoria on June 13, 2015 and designed for women of Latina descent who are Australian permanent residents or citizens. The Miss América Latina international beauty contest was chosen for the winner of the 2016 Australian pageant to be a part of. Eva Giollo in 2015 was the first title holder and delegate for Australia on the international stage. The Miss Latina Australia pageant has received extensive coverage through National Spanish newspapers such as the Latin Australian Times and El Español and is a highlight for the Spanish speaking community in Australia.

== Charity ==
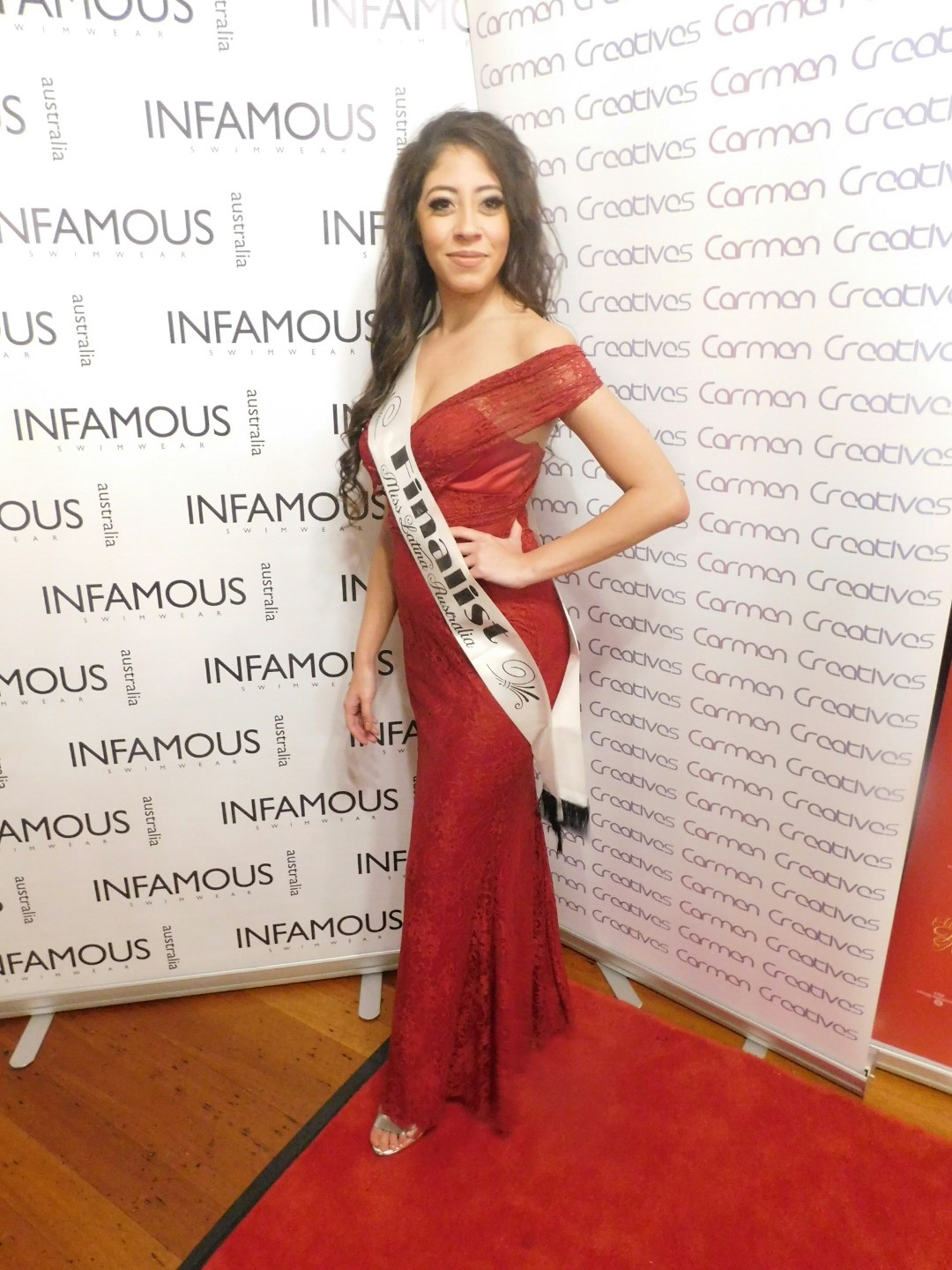
Daniella Seoane (Miss Latina Australia Charity Award)

Estela Tapia is the National Director of Miss Latina Australia pageant which supports the “Hogar Maria Auxiliadora” Orphanage in Cochabamba Bolivia. Several of the Finalists fundraise for this cause, and the most successful fundraiser receives the Miss Latina Australia Charity Award, this year it was Uruguayan born Daniella Seoane

== Results ==
Age	Name	Awards	Heritage
21	Georgette Psarreas	Crowned Winner	Chilean/Greek
22	Daniella Seoane	Runner up + Miss Charity	Uruguayan
23	Jesica Bustamante	Miss People's Choice	Salvadorian
24	Tatiana Castiblanco	Miss Photogenic + International	Colombian
19	Andrea Atherton	Finalist	Filipino/Chilean
23	Chantell Andrades	Finalist	Chilean
17	Chaveli Goya	Finalist	Chilean
19	Francisca Fierro	Finalist	Chilean
21	Gloria Izavoth McInerney	Finalist	Peruvian
26	Layce Renee Vocale	Finalist	Spanish/Italian/Aboriginal
22	Rebecca Bone	Finalist	Portuguese/Brazilian
20	Stephanie Lemus	Finalist	Salvadorian

== See also ==
- List of beauty contests
- Miss Latina Australia
- Miss Lindeza 2017
