= Miss Panamá 2015 =

Miss Panamá 2015 was held at the Megapolis Convention Center on Monday, August 24, 2015. The event was broadcast on Telemetro.

Miss Panamá 2014, Yomatzy Hazlewood of Darién crowned her successor Gladys Brandao of Los Santos, as the Miss Panama. Nicole Pinto, Miss World Panama 2014 of Panamá Oeste, crowned her successor, Diana Jaen of Cocle, as the Miss World Panama winner and Marisel Franco of Veraguas crowned her successor Catherine Agrazal of Veraguas.

Brandao later competed in Miss Universe 2015, which was held on December 20 at Zappos Theater in Las Vegas, Nevada. Jaén represented Panama in Miss World 2015, which was held on December 19 at the Crown of Beauty Theatre in Sanya, Hainan.

== Miss Panamá Universe ==
Miss Panamá Universe
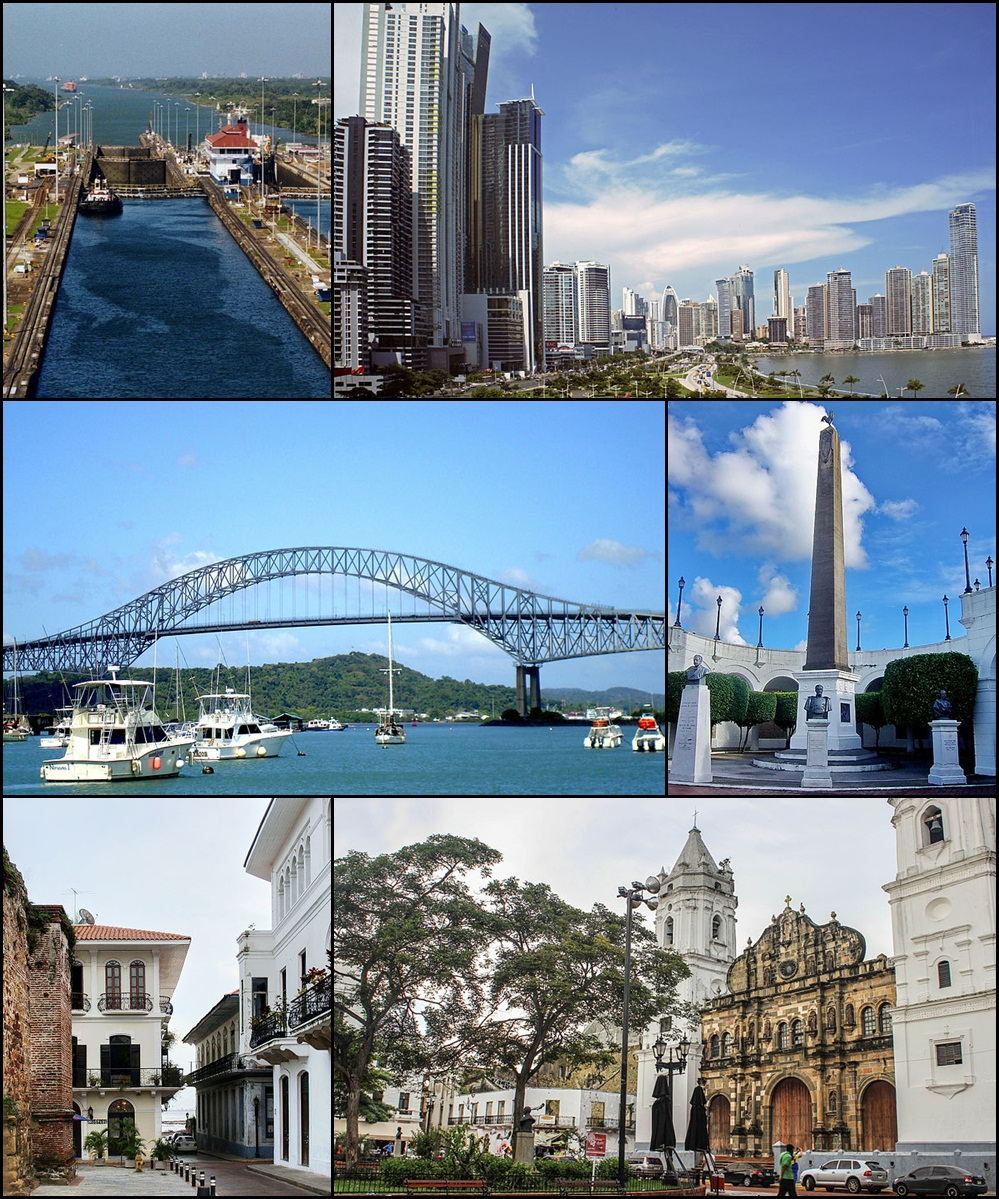
- Date: August 24, 2015
- Presenters: Marco Oses and Roseta Bordanea
- Entertainment: Rabanes & Flex
- Venue: Hotel Hard Rock Cafe Megapolis, Ciudad de Panamá, Panama
- Broadcaster: Telemetro
- Entrants: 24
- Placements: 6
- Winner: Gladys Brandao; Los Santos

The event was held at the Hard Rock Cafe Megapolis Panamá in Panama City, Panama, on August 24, 2015. A total of 24 contestants from around the country competed for the title. At the end of the event, Miss Panamá 2014, Yomatzy Hazlewood, crowned her successor as the new Miss Panamá.

=== Final results ===
Final results	Contestant
Miss Panamá 2015	Los Santos (Miss Las Santos) - Gladys Brandao Amaya
1st runner-up	Herrera (Miss Pese) - Joseline Pinto
2nd runner-up	Colón (Miss Chame) - Nayomy Mendoza
3rd runner-up	Bocas del Toro (Miss Bocas del Toro) - Estefanía Mora
4th runner-up	Darién (Miss Darién) - Leydis González

=== Special awards ===
Award	Contestant
Miss Photogenic (Miss Fotogénica)	Chiriquí (Miss Potrerillos) - Valeria Selles
Miss Popularity	Panamá (Miss Chame) - Nayomy Mendoza
Miss Congeniality (Miss Amistad)	Comarcas (Miss Comarcas) - Daniela Ochoa
Miss Fitness (Mejor Silueta)	Herrera (Miss Pese) - Joseline Pinto
Miss Top Model (Srta. Modelo)	Panamá (Miss Pedregal) - Marelys Medina
Best Hair (Mejor Cabellera)	Villa de los Santos (Miss Villa de los Santos) - Alexandra Arosemena
Best Evolution (Mejor Evolución)	Panamá (Miss Pacora) - Jenise Richards McKenzie
Best Face (Mejor Rostro)	Herrera (Miss Pese) - Joseline Pinto
Miss Excellence (Srta. Excelencia)	Los Santos (Miss Los Santos) - Gladys Brandao Amaya
Miss Fitness (Srta. Fitness)	Panamá (Miss San Francisco) - Natalie Abad
Miss Beach Beauty (Srta. Belleza Playera)	Herrera (Miss Pese) - Joseline Pinto
Miss Multimedia	Veraguas (Miss Veraguas) - Catherine Agrazal
Best Talent (Mejor Talento)	Los Santos (Miss Los Santos) - Gladys Brandao Amaya

== Costume competition ==
This year, a preliminary costume competition was held, where Panamanian designers competed to design costumes that combined the past and present of Panama. The winning costume went on to represent Panamá in Miss Universe 2015.

Final results	Contest	Designer	Topic
Winner	Best National Costume to Miss Universe	Javier Hernandez	"Las tumbas Doradas de Sitio Conte en Panamá"
1st runner-up		Juan Carlos Robinson	"Fiestas de mi Panamá" "Las Vacas locas"

== Preliminary interviews ==
Preliminary interviews were held on August 23. Miss Panamá candidates wore swimsuits and had personal interviews.

== Judges ==
- Virginia Hernández - Miss World Panamá 2013
- Maricely González - Miss World Panamá 2012
- Irene Núñez - Miss World Panamá 2011
- Yesenia Casanova - Miss World Panamá 1999
- Madeleine Legnadier - Miss World Panamá 1990
- Ricardo Quintero - Fashion photographer
- Orly Benzacar
- José Luis Rodríguez
- Maria Fernanda Maduro
- Michael Horth

== Miss Panamá World ==
Miss Panama World 2015
- Date: August 24, 2015.
- Presenters: Roseta Bordanea & Jossie Jimenez
- Venue: Hotel Hard Rock Cafe Megapolis, Ciudad de Panamá, Panama
- Broadcaster: Telemetro
- Entrants: 24
- Placements: 3
- Winner: Diana Jaén; Cocle

The Miss Panamá Mundo pageant was held at the Hotel Hard Rock Cafe Megapolis, Panama City, Panama, on August 24. Around 24 contestants from all over Panamá competed for the title. This year, by decision of the international Miss World Organization, the election of the new global sovereign was held in a separate competition to the traditional national election. Nicole Pinto (Miss Panamá World 2014) crowned her successor, Diana Jaén, as the new Miss Panamá World.

=== Final results ===
Final results	Contestant
Miss Panamá World 2015	Coclé (Miss Coclé) - Diana Doris Jaén Ortega
1st runner-up	Los Santos (Miss Las Santos) - Gladys Brandao Amaya
2nd runner-up	Herrera (Miss Pese) - Joseline Pinto

== Official contestants ==
The following table lists the competitors who have been selected.

Estate	Represents	Contestant	Age	Hometown
Chiriquí	Miss Alanje	Sarai Berenice Cervera Ortega	19	Chiriquí
Bocas del Toro	Miss Bocas del Toro	Estefanía Mora Quirós	24	Ciudad de Panamá
Chiriquí	Miss Bugaba	Yulieth Rivera	24	Chiriquí
Panamá	Miss Chame	Nayomy A. Mendoza Diamantidis	24	Ciudad de Panamá
Herrera	Miss Chitre	Yirieth Noemí Nieto Reyes	20	Herrera
Coclé	Miss Coclé	Diana Jaén	23	Coclé
Comarcas	Miss Comarcas	Daniela Ochoa Barragan	21	Ciudad de Panamá
Darién	Miss Darién	Leydis Maibeth González Rivas	18	Darién
Panamá Este	Miss Don Bosco	Nahitsory González	25	Ciudad de Panamá
Panamá	Miss Las Cumbres	Sonia Patricia Velásquez Lezcano	24	Ciudad de Panamá
Los Santos	Miss Los Santos	Gladys Brandao Amaya	24	Los Santos
Panamá Este	Miss Madugandí	Beatriz Silva	23	Ciudad de Panamá
Panamá	Miss Pacora	Jenise Elaine Richards McKenzie	24	Ciudad de Panamá
Panamá	Miss Panamá Centro	Génesis Christine Arjona Gómez	23	Ciudad de Panamá
Panamá Oeste	Miss Panamá Oeste	Lissa Gutierrez	25	Panamá Oeste
Panamá Este	Miss Pedregal	Marelys Medina Gómez	21	Ciudad de Panamá
Herrera	Miss Pese	Joseline Pinto De Gracia	19	Herrera
Chiriquí	Miss Potrerillos	Valeria Selles	18	Chiriquí
Colón	Miss Puerto Pilón	Jhasmeiry Herrera	20	Ciudad de Colón
Colón	Miss San Cristobal	Nikkei Brathwhite	19	Ciudad de Colón
Panamá	Miss San Francisco	Natalie Abad	23	Ciudad de Panamá
Panamá	Miss Tocumen	Francheska Edith Francisco	22	Ciudad de Panamá
Los Santos	Miss Villa de los Santos	Alexandra Victoria Arosemena Araúz	23	Los Santos
Veraguas	Miss Veraguas	Catherine Argelia Agrazal Pinilla	23	Veraguas

=== Presentation show ===
This preliminary competition (also called "The Runway" and the "Council of the Misses") was held on August 3. The 24 finalists were selected for the pageant. A jury panel, together with the advice of the misses, selected the finalists based on individual performances during events in the Swimsuit and Cocktail Dress categories.

== Preliminary contestants ==
The following contestants were part of the top 30, but were eliminated in the preliminary meeting on August 5.

Estate	Represents	Contestant	Hometown
Chiriquí	Miss Boquete	Keyla Al Halabi	Chiriquí
Colón	Miss Chagres	Madeleine Medianero	Ciudad de Colón
Los Santos	Miss Las Tablas	Rita Tello	Los Santos
Panamá Oeste	Miss San Carlos	Gianilliz Goico	Ciudad de Panamá
Herrera	Miss Santa María	Naomi García	Herrera

== Historical significance ==
- Different regions and provinces were used this year, changing the naming format used previously.
- Los Santos won Miss Panamá for eighth time in history. The previous time was in 2009, when Diana Broce won.
- Veraguas won Reinado Internacional del Cafe Panamá for the second consecutive year.
- Panama Centro failed to advance to the final round for the second consecutive year.
- Darien reached the top six for the second consecutive year.
- Bocas del Toro reached the final top after three years. The previous time was in 2012, with Maricely González.
- Colón reached the final top after two years. The previous time was in 2013, with Zumay Elena Antonios.
- States reached the top six the previous year were Veraguas, Los Santos, Darien, and Herrera.

== Election schedule ==
- August 5: presentation show
- August 5: costume competition
- August 24: final night and coronation of Miss Panamá 2015

== Candidates notes ==
- Nayomy Mendoza Diamantidis participated in the National Pageants: Miss Panama Latinoamericana 2014 and won the title Miss Global Panamá 2014.
- Estefanía Mora Quirós participated in the national pageant: Bellezas Panamá 2013.
- Genesis Arjona was Miss Globe Panamá 2014 and participated in the Miss Globe International 2014 in Azerbaijan, where she reached the top 20.
- Diana Jaén was Miss Tourism International Panamá 2013 and participated in the Miss Tourism International 2013 in Malaysia.
- Gladys Brandao was Miss Yacht Model Panamá 2012 and participated in Miss Yacht Model International 2012 in Sanya, Hainan.
- Daniela Ochoa competed in Miss International 2016 pageant, which was held on October 27, 2016, at the Tokyo Dome City Hall in Tokyo, Japan.
