= Miss Latina Australia =

Beauty pageant

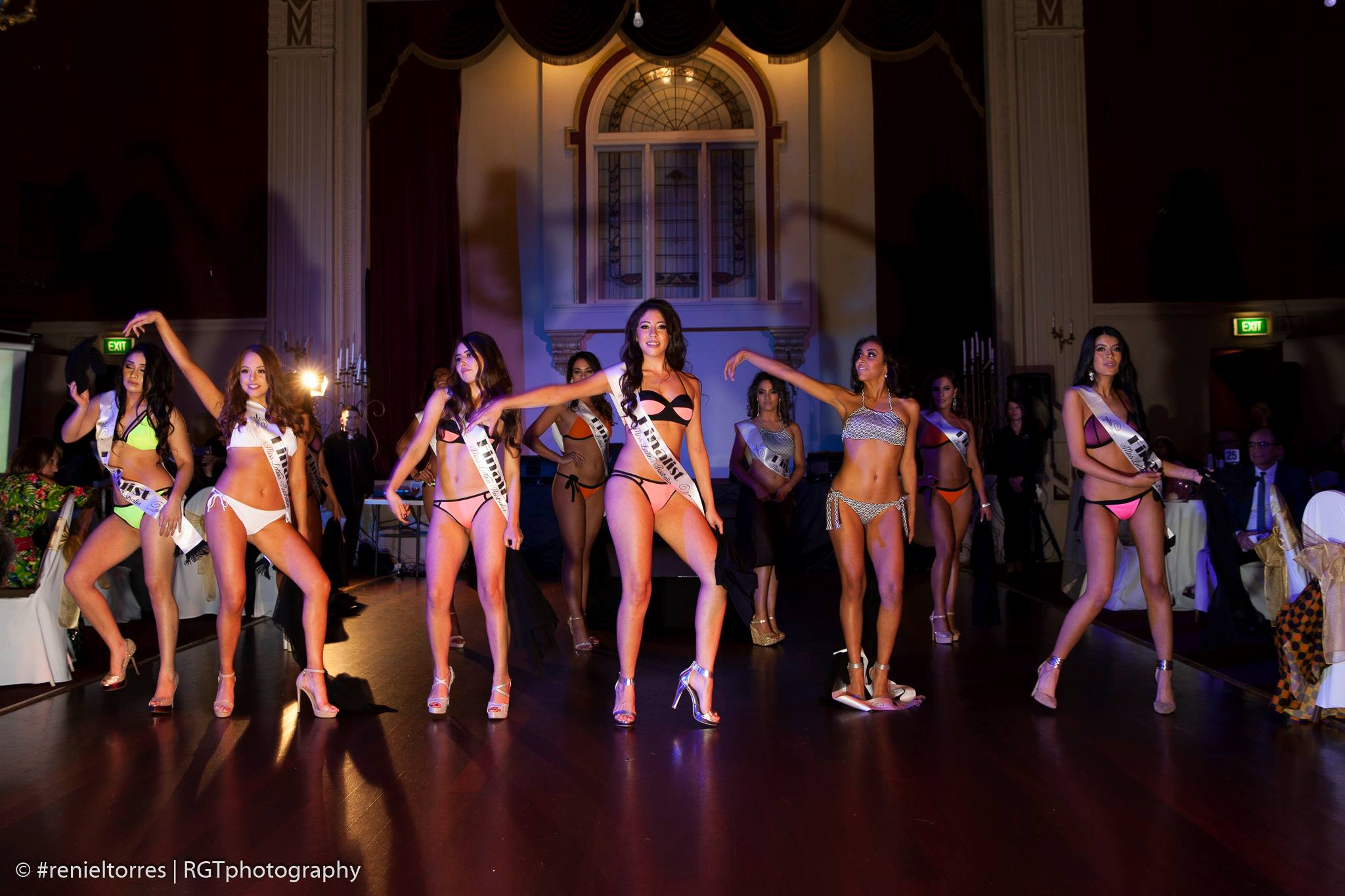
Miss Latina Australia 2016 pageant in the historical Regent Ballroom, Melbourne

Miss Latina Australia is an Australian national beauty pageant was held in 2015 and 2016 run by E & E Events Management and Estela Tapia is National Director of the contest. It was first held at the Golden Star Receptions in Epping, Victoria on June 13, 2015 and designed for women of Latina descent who are Australian permanent residents or citizens. Tapia chose to send the winners of the 2015 and 2016 pageants all expenses paid to compete in the Miss América Latina international beauty contest.

The Miss Latina Australia pageant has received extensive coverage through National Spanish newspapers such as the Latin Australian Times and El Español and is a highlight for the Spanish speaking community in Australia. Filipinos with Hispanic or Latino descent were encouraged to participate, Miss Latina Australia 2015 Eva Giollo is of Argentinian and Filipino descent, 2016 Finalist Andrea Atherton was also of Filipino decent, this received much attention from the Australian Filipino community though their leading print national newspaper The Philippine Times.

The current titleholder is Georgette Psarreas who was crowned on July 9, 2016 in The Regent Ballroom, Melbourne, Victoria.

== Charity ==
The Miss Latina Australia contest supports the “Hogar Maria Auxiliadora” Orphanage in Cochabamba, Bolivia. Many of the finalists fundraise for this cause and the most successful fundraiser is awarded the Miss Latina Australia Charity Award.

== Miss Latina Australia 2016 ==
Miss Latina Australia 2016 took place on July 23, 2016, in the Regent Ballroom in Northcote, Melbourne. 12 finalists participated in the gala event. At the conclusion of the final event Georgette Psarreas (Chilean & Greek) was crowned Miss Latina Australia with Daniella Seoane (Uruguayan) second place and Miss charity. Jesica Bustamante (El Salvadorian) won title of people's choice, Tatiana Castiblanco (Colombian) winning Miss Photogenic.

== Titleholders ==
Year	Name	Host City	Venue	Heritage
2015	Eva Giollo	Melbourne	Golden Star Receptions	Argentinian/Filipino
2016	Georgette Psarreas	Melbourne	The Regent Ballroom	Chilean/Greek
2017	Georgette Psarreas	Melbourne	Melrose reception	Chilean/Greek

== See also ==
- List of beauty contests
- Miss Latina Australia 2016
- Miss Lindeza 2017
