= Miss América Latina =

International Beauty pageant

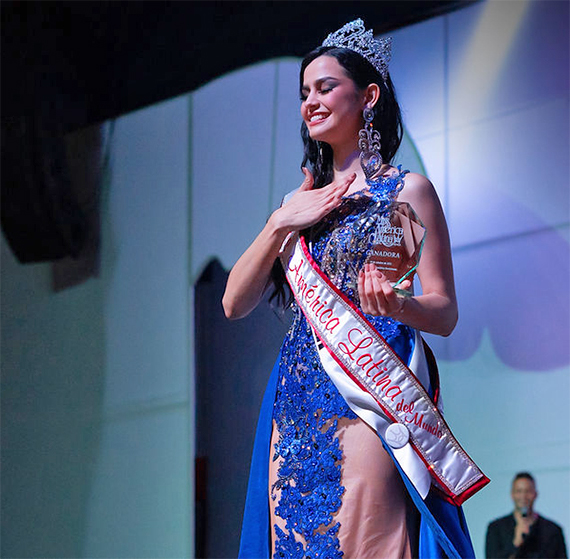
- Formation: 1981; 45 years ago
- Founder: Acirema Alayeto
- Type: Beauty pageant
- Headquarters: Miami
- Location: United States
- President: Acirema Alayeto (1981-present)
- Website: https://missamericalatina.com

Miss América Latina or Miss América Latina del Mundo, known in English as Miss Latin America or Miss Latin America of the World, is an international beauty contest held annually. It is organized by the Miss América Latina Organization. Despite its name, the contest is not restricted to only Latin American nations. It is designed for women of Latina descent around the globe. There is an average of about 20 contestants every year. It has two sister pageants: Miss Latina US (which selects the US delegate to Miss América Latina) and Miss Teen US Latina.

The current titleholder is Massiel Chupani from the Dominican Republic.

== History ==
The Miss América Latina pageant was founded in the early 1980s. The first edition was held in 1981, when it was open to only Latina contestants in Miami, Florida, United States. In 1983, the contest went international.

== Titleholders ==
Year	Name	Represented	Host city	Host country
1981	Lesley Quintanilla	United States	Miami, Florida	United States
1982	Martha Álvarez	United States	Miami, Florida	United States
1983	María Rosa	Puerto Rico	Miami, Florida	United States
1984	Mirla Ochoa	Venezuela	Miami, Florida	United States
1985	Victoria Mauríz	Dominican Republic	Miami, Florida	United States
1986	Lucía Collado	Dominican Republic	San José	Costa Rica
1987-1988 (Note: The 1988 event was postponed until 1989 because of the Mexican presidential inauguration, and thus Lorenia Burruel was named Miss América Latina 1987-88)	Lorenia Burruel	Mexico	Santa Cruz de la Sierra	Bolivia
1989	Suzanne Hannaux	El Salvador	Hermosillo, Sonora	Mexico
1990	Vanessa Holler	Venezuela	San Salvador	El Salvador
1991	María Elena Bellido	Peru	Buenos Aires	Argentina
1992	Ana Sofía Pereira	Nicaragua	Guayaquil	Ecuador
1993	María Fernanda Morales	Guatemala	Guatemala City	Guatemala
1994 (Note: The 1995 event was canceled due to a national crisis in the host city. Priscila Furlan was then named Miss América Latina 1994-95.)	Priscila Furlan	Brazil	Guayaquil	Ecuador
1996 (Note: The 1997 event was postponed for unknown reasons. Thus, Jeannette Chávez's title was extended to Miss América Latina 1996-97)	Jeannette Chávez	Costa Rica	Lima	Peru
1998 (Note: The 1999 event was renamed to Miss América Latina 2000 in order to post-date the titles. Aline Resende's title was changed to Miss América Latina 1998-99.)	Aline Resende	Brazil	Costa del Sol	El Salvador
2000	Dania Prince	Honduras	Guatemala City	Guatemala
2001	Grace Martins	Brazil	Montelimar Beach	Nicaragua
2002	Claudia Cruz	Dominican Republic	Bávaro Beach	Dominican Republic
2003	María Carolina Casado	Venezuela	Playa Tambor	Costa Rica
2004	Gamalis Fermín	Puerto Rico	Cancún, Quintana Roo	Mexico
2005	Mariela Candia	Paraguay	Punta Cana	Dominican Republic
2006	Melissa Quesada	United States	Riviera Maya, Quintana Roo	Mexico
2007	Giannina Silva (dethroned)	Uruguay	Riviera Maya, Quintana Roo	Mexico
2007	Heidy García (successor)	Guatemala	Riviera Maya, Quintana Roo	Mexico
2008	Daniele Sampaio	Italy	Punta Cana	Dominican Republic
2009	Johanna Solano	Costa Rica	Punta Cana	Dominican Republic
2010	Carolina Lemus	Colombia	Punta Cana	Dominican Republic
2011	Estefani Chalco	Ecuador	Punta Cana	Dominican Republic
2012	Georgina Méndez	Guatemala	Playa del Carmen, Quintana Roo	Mexico
2013	Julia Guerra	Brazil	Riviera Maya, Quintana Roo	Mexico
2014	Nicole Pinto (resigned)	Panama	Punta Cana	Dominican Republic
2014	Yaniré Ortiz (successor)	Spain	Punta Cana	Dominican Republic
2015	Karla Monje	United States	Riviera Maya, Quintana Roo	Mexico
2016	Laura Spoya	Peru	Riviera Maya, Quintana Roo	Mexico
2017	Elicena Andrada	Spain	Bahías de Huatulco, Oaxaca	Mexico
2018	Nadine Teresa Verhulp	Netherlands	Punta Cana	Dominican Republic
2019-2020	Nancy Gómez	United States	Punta Cana	Dominican Republic
2021	Yosdany Navarro	Venezuela	Punta Cana	Dominican Republic
2022	María Fátima Gaspar	Portugal	Punta Cana	Dominican Republic
2023	Ana Paula Caudana	Argentina	Punta Cana	Dominican Republic
2024	Massiel Chupani	Dominican Republic	Punta Cana	Dominican Republic
2025	Letícia Borges	Brazil	Punta Cana	Dominican Republic

== Number of titleholders by country ==
Country/Territory	Titles	Winning/Title Years
Brazil	5	1994, 1998, 2001, 2013,2025
United States	5	1981, 1982, 2006, 2015, 2019
Dominican Republic	4	1985, 1986, 2002, 2024
Venezuela	4	1984, 1990, 2003, 2021
Guatemala	3	1993, 2007, 2012
Spain	2	2014, 2017
Peru	2	1991, 2016
Costa Rica	2	1996, 2009
Puerto Rico	2	1983, 2004
Argentina	1	2023
Portugal	1	2022
Netherlands	1	2018
Ecuador	1	2011
Colombia	1	2010
Italy	1	2008
Paraguay	1	2005
Honduras	1	2000
Nicaragua	1	1992
El Salvador	1	1989
Mexico	1	1987

* The first two Miss Latin America contests were only open to women living in Miami. Although the winners of both contests are regarded as official Miss Latin America titleholders, their wins do not appear in the United States' tally.

== See also ==
- List of beauty pageants
