= Cocotal Golf and Country Club =

Gated community in Bávaro, Dominican Republic

Coordinates: 18.669°N 68.426°W

Cocotal Golf & Country Club is a gated community located in Bávaro, Dominican Republic, near the Punta Cana International Airport.

It features a golf course designed by Jose "Pepe" Gancedo, a Spanish golfer, which has 27 holes.

It is also home to a real estate community called "Palma Real Villas" which is a Sol Meliá Hotels & Resorts development.
