= Miss Lindeza 2017 =

Australian beauty pageant

- Date: 17 June 2017
- Venue: Melrose Reception, Tullamarine, Victoria
- Entrants: TBA
- Placements: 5
- Winner: TBA

Miss Lindeza 2017 is an Australian national beauty pageant run by E & E Events Management and Estela Tapia is National Director of the contest. It was first held with the name Miss Latina Australia and is now a hybrid of the original contest with new categories such as Miss Teen, Junior and Multi-cultural for contestants of background other than spano/Latino heritage. The South American pageant Reina Hispanoamericana in Bolivia has been chosen for the winner of Miss Lindeza to go represent Australia in 2017.

== Charity ==
Miss Lindeza will be flown to Bolivia home to the “Hogar Maria Auxiliadora” Orphanage E & E Events has been raising funds through its pageants since 2015 for this cause, this makes a logical fit for Lindeza having the Orphanage and Reina Hispanoamericana located in the same country.

== History ==
The original pageant named Miss Latina Australia took place on 2015 then again in 2016, in the Regent Ballroom in Northcote, Melbourne. The pageant has now been named Miss Lindeza and has a larger categories not limited to contestants of Hispanic/Latino heritage. Georgette Psarreas the current title holder was crowned on July 9, 2016 in The Regent Ballroom, Melbourne, Victoria.

== Categories ==
The first casting took place on 12 and the second on 26 April 2017 in Melrose Reception in Tullamarine, Victoria. The categories for Miss Lindeza 2017 vary from age to cultural heritage and are broader than previous pageants.

- Miss Lindeza Hispana/Latina ages 18 to 27 of Hispanic or Latino heritage.
- Miss Lindeza International for non Australian residents aged 18 to 35 such as overseas students.
- Miss Lindeza Multi-Cultural ages 18 to 35 for any cultural heritage other than Hispanic/Latino.
- Miss Teen Lindeza ages 13 to 17.
- Miss Junior Lindeza ages 5 to 12.

== Titleholders ==
=== Miss Lindeza Hispana/Latina ===
Year	Name	State	Venue	Heritage
2017	TBA	TBA	Melrose reception	TBA

=== Miss Lindeza International ===
Year	Name	State	Venue	Heritage
2017	TBA	TBA	Melrose reception	TBA

=== Miss Lindeza Multi-Cultural ===
Year	Name	State	Venue	Heritage
2017	TBA	TBA	Melrose reception	TBA

=== Miss Teen Lindeza ===
Year	Name	State	Venue	Heritage
2017	TBA	TBA	Melrose reception	TBA

=== Miss Junior Lindeza ===
Year	Name	State	Venue	Heritage
2017	TBA	TBA	Melrose reception	TBA

== See also ==
- List of beauty contests
- Miss Latina Australia 2016
- Miss Latina Australia
