= Raiza Erlenbaugh =

Panamanian scientist, anthropologist, model and beauty queen

- Born: Raiza Patricia Erlenbaugh Soriano; March 6, 1991 (age 35); Panama City, Panama
- Occupations: Model; Beauty queen
- Height: 1.77 m (5 ft 9 1/2 in)

Raiza Patricia Erlenbaugh Soriano de Chaviano, (Panama City, Panama, March 6, 1991) is a Panamanian scientist, anthropologist, model and former beauty queen. She was crowned Miss Panama World 2014 on April 8, 2014 to represent Panama in the Miss World 2014 pageant. She also participated in the Miss Continentes Unidos 2014 pageant in Ecuador, where she stood out by showcasing Panama's rich cultural heritage and took second place in the National Costume Gala. However, on November 12, 2014, she was removed from her title as Miss Panama World 2014 by the Miss Panama Organization. In 2022, she married architect Arian Chaviano.

== Academic and professional career ==
After her career in beauty pageants, Erlenbaugh turned to anthropology, becoming a licensed anthropologist specializing in the study of Panama's pre-Hispanic past. She graduated with a Bachelor's degree in Anthropology from the University of Panama, being a member of the honorary chapter of Sigma Lambda. Her experience and dedication led her to serve as a research technician and curator of archaeological collections at the Smithsonian Tropical Research Institute (STRI) in Panama, where she has made significant contributions to archaeological research and public outreach.

== Published work ==
In 2024, Erlenbaugh published his first book, Catalog of Pre-Hispanic Ceramics, Cerro Juan Díaz, Panama (200 BC–1550 AD). This comprehensive educational tool provides invaluable archaeological data to both researchers and the general public, offering new perspectives on the pre-Hispanic history and culture of Panama.

== Awards and recognition ==
In November 2024, Erlenbaugh was awarded the prestigious Jackson/Knowlton Award for Outstanding Contribution to Science by STRI. This recognition highlighted her innovative research on pre-Hispanic ceramics and her dedication to advancing scientific knowledge. Her work has been recognized for providing novel perspectives on the Gran Coclé culture, including its social and cultural development for centuries before European contact.

Her contributions have been published in prominent STRI media outlets such as Ceramic Puzzles. She also regularly participates in workshops and educational programs on artifact reconstruction techniques and methods for interpreting the past.

In the Miss Panama 2014 pageant, Erlenbaugh not only won the title of Miss Panama World, but also the Miss Photogenic award, standing out for her elegance and stage presence.

== Miss Panamá World 2014 ==
At the end of the Miss Panamá 2014 she also received awards including Miss Photogenic.

== Miss World 2014 ==
Raiza was supposed to fly to the London in November to compete with almost 100 other candidates to be Megan Young successor, but on November 12, 2014 Miss Panamá Organization decided not to let her compete for not fulfilled her duties. She was replaced by Nicole Pinto who was the 1st Runner-up at Miss Mundo Panamá 2014 pageant and was later crowned, Miss Latin America 2014 which she later quit to go to the Miss World 2014.
