= Betzy Madrid =

Betzy Del Carmen Madrid
- Born: Betzy Del Carmen Madrid; July 22, 1994 (age 32); Panama City, Panama
- Height: 1.78 m (5 ft 10 in)
- Beauty pageant titleholder
- Title: Bellezas Panamá 2013 – Miss Panamá Internacional 2013
- Hair color: Brown
- Eye color: Brown
- Major competitions: Miss International Panamá 2013 (winner), Miss International 2013 (unplace)

Betzy Del Carmen Madrid (born July 22, 1994) is a Panamanian model and beauty pageant titleholder who represented the Panamá Centro province in the Bellezas Panamá 2013 pageant, on August 9, 2013 and won the title of Miss Panamá International 2013.

Madrid who is 5 ft 10 in (1.78 m) tall, represented her country Panama in the 2013 Miss International beauty pageant, which took place on December 17, 2013, in Shinagawa Prince Hotel Hall, Tokyo, Japan.

Awards and achievements
Preceded by Karen Jordán	Miss International Panama; 2013	Succeeded by Aileen Bernal
