= Miss Panamá 2014 =

Miss Panamá 2014, the 48th Annual edition of the Miss Panamá pageant, selected representatives from Panama to Miss World, Miss Universe & Miss Intercontinental pageant. The pageant was split into two contests: Miss Panamá Mundo and Miss Panamá Universo. It was broadcast live on Telemetro. About 16 contestants from all over Panamá competed for the crown. Miss Panamá 2013, Carolina Brid of Veraguas crowned Yomatzy Maurineth Hazlewood De La Rosa of Darién at the end of the event as the new Miss Panamá Universe, also Sara Bello Miss Intercontinental Panamá 2013 of Los Santos crowned to Stephanie Gonzáles of Los Santos as the new Miss Intercontinental Panamá.

There was a new change after four years was continued the final competition entitled "Miss Panamá World" was announced the winner of the Miss Panamá Mundo title. Virginia Hernández Miss Panamá World 2013 of Panamá Centro crowned Raiza Patricia Erlenbaugh Soriano of Panamá Centro as the new Miss Panamá World at the end of the event. The winner cannot participate in the competition for Miss Panama Universe. On November 12, 2014, Erlenbaugh was dethroned as Miss World Panamá 2014 and replaced by her 1st runner-up Nicole Pinto.

Yomatzy Hazlewood Miss Panamá Universe represented Panama in Miss Universe 2014 in Doral, United States. Nicole Pinto, Miss Panamá World, on the other hand, represented the country in Miss World 2014 which was held in London, United Kingdom. Stephanie Paulette Gonzáles Miss Panamá Intercontinental represented the country in Miss Intercontinental 2014 in Germany.

== Miss Panamá Universe ==
Miss Panamá Universe
- Date: June 12, 2014.
- Presenters: Miguel Herrera, Madelaine Leignadier Dawson & Maricely González
- Entertainment: Janelle Davidson, Priscila Moreno & Buxxy
- Venue: Hotel Riu Plaza Panama, Ciudad de Panamá, Panama
- Broadcaster: Telemetro
- Entrants: 15
- Placements: 6
- Winner: Yomatzy Hazlewood; Darién

The Miss Panamá Universe was held at the Hotel Riu Plaza Panama., Ciudad de Panamá, Panama, on 12 June 2014. About 16 contestants from all over Panamá will compete for the prestigious crown. Miss Panamá 2013, Carolina Brid crowned her successor at the end of the event as the new Miss Panamá Universe, also Sara Bello Miss Intercontinental Panamá 2013 crowned her successor as the new Miss Intercontinental Panamá.

== Final results ==
=== Placements ===
Final results	Contestant
Miss Panamá Universe 2014	Darién - Yomatzy Hazlewood
Miss Panamá Intercontinental	Los Santos (Miss Las Tablas) - Stephanie Paulette Gonzáles
Miss Panamá Latinoamerica del Mundo	Panamá Oeste (Miss Chame) - Nicole Pinto
1st runner-up	Herrera (Miss Ocú) - Elida Guadalupe Navarro Madrid
2nd runner-up	Veraguas (Miss Santiago) - Leydili Marieth Caballero Domínguez
3rd runner-up	Veraguas (Miss Veraguas) - Marisel Franco González

- Originally Carmen Isabel Jaramillo won the title of Miss Panamá Latinoamerica del Mundo but three days later resigned and was replaced for Nicole Pinto (Miss Chame) and Miss Veraguas Marisel Franco González ascended as 3rd runner up.

=== Special awards ===
Award	Contestant
Miss Photogenic (Miss Fotogénica)	Keisy N. Amaya Mojica (Miss Portobelo)
Miss Congeniality (Miss Amistad)	Sara Elicia Cook Ramírez (Miss Ancón)
Miss Education (Miss Educacion)	Yomatzy Hazlewood (Miss Darien)
Miss Fitness (Mejor Silueta)	Astrid Yamileth Torres (Miss Coclé)
Best Runway (Mejor Pasarela)	Marisel Franco González (Miss Veraguas)
Best Hair (Mejor Cabellera)	Astrid Yamileth Torres (Miss Coclé)
Best Body (Mejor Cuerpo)	Yomatzy Hazlewood (Miss Darien)
Best Face (Mejor Rostro Panasonic Beauty)	Angelica Milena Cedeño Espino (Miss Panamá Este)
Best Eyes (Mejor Vista Opticas Chevalier)	Leydili Marieth Caballero Domínguez (Miss Santiago)

== National Costume Competition ==
This year the contestant, was celebrated in a private casting. It is a competition showing the country's wealth embodied in the colorful and fascinating costumes made by Panamenian designers combining the past and present of Panama. The winner costume represent Panamá in Miss Universe 2014.

Final results	Contest	Designer	Topic
Winner	Best National Costume to Miss Universe	Randol Ching	“Diosas de las medusas”

== Preliminary Interview ==
Held on Wednesday June 11 to Miss Panama candidates were qualified in swimsuit and personal interview.

== Judges ==
- Paola Bracho -
- Héctor Joaquín - Specialist in Beauty pageants.
- Karina González - Nuestra Belleza México 2011.
- Marcelino Jimenez -
- Stephanie Vander Werf - Miss Panamá 2012.
- Gerardo Mosquera -
- Shivam Mejoral -
- Tatiana Campagnani - Contestant in Miss Panamá 2011.
- Jossie Jimenez - TV presenter.

== Official Contestants ==
These are the competitors who have been selected this year.

Estate	Represents	Contestant	Age	Height	Hometown
Panamá	Miss Ancón	Sara Elicia Cook Ramírez	24	1.73 m (5 ft 8 in)	Seattle, Washington
Panamá	Miss Chame	Nicole Pinto	19	1.74 m (5 ft 8 1/2 in)	Ciudad de Panamá
Chiriquí	Miss Chiriquí	María de los Ángeles Suarez Carrera	24	1.71 m (5 ft 7 1/4 in)	Boquete
Coclé	Miss Coclé	Astrid Yamileth Torres	21	1.71 m (5 ft 7 1/4 in)	Ciudad de Panamá
Darién	Miss Darién	Yomatzy Maurineth Hazlewood De La Rosa	23	1.76 m (5 ft 9 1/4 in)	Ciudad de Panamá
Los Santos	Miss Macaracas	Carmen Librada De Gracia Navarro	23	1.80 m (5 ft 10 3/4 in)	Los Santos
Los Santos	Miss Las Tablas	Stephanie Paulette González	24	1.77 m (5 ft 9 3/4 in)	Ciudad de Panamá
Herrera	Miss Ocú	Elida Guadalupe Navarro Madrid	24	1.71 m (5 ft 7 1/4 in)	Ocú
Panamá	Miss Panamá Centro	Beatriz Victoria Stein Peña	19	1.78 m (5 ft 10 in)	Ciudad de Panamá
Panamá	Miss Panamá Este	Angelica Milena Cedeño Espino	24	1.71 m (5 ft 7 1/4 in)	Ciudad de Panamá
Panamá Oeste	Miss Panamá Oeste	Carmen Isabel Jaramillo	19	1.78 m (5 ft 10 in)	La Chorrera
Herrera	Miss Pesé	Katrina Enith López Gutiérrez	23	1.73 m (5 ft 8 in)	Pesé
Colón	Miss Portobelo	Keisy N. Amaya Mojica	19	1.69 m (5 ft 6 1/2 in)	Ciudad de Colón
Los Santos	Miss Villa de los Santos	Aileen Haydee Bernal Ardines	19	1.81 m (5 ft 11 1/4 in)	Herrera
Veraguas	Miss Santiago	Leydili Marieth Caballero Domínguez	18	1.70 m (5 ft 7 in)	Ciudad de Panamá
Veraguas	Miss Veraguas	Marisel Franco González	18	1.78 m (5 ft 10 in)	Mariato

=== Presentation Show ===
This Preliminary Competition also called The Runway and the Council of the Misses the event will be held on 8 April 2014, is the night when the fifteen finalists were selected from Miss Panama Universe 2014. A jury panel, together with the advice of the misses, selected the finalists based on the outputs of the girls during the event in the Swimsuit and cocktail dress categories. This night also will be selected the winner of the Miss Panama World title.

== Historical significance ==
- Different regions and provinces were used this year, changing the naming format used previously.
- Los Santos (Las Tablas) won Miss Intercontinental Panamá for second consecutive year.
- Darien wins the Miss Universe Panama title for the second time.
- Panama Oeste Wins the title of Miss Latinoamerica Mundo for the first time.
- Panama Centro failed to place in the final round after six consecutive years.
- States that placed in the top 6 the previous year were Veraguas, Los Santos.

== Miss Panamá World ==
Miss Panama World 2014
- Date: April 8, 2014.
- Presenters: Maricely González & Miguel Herrera
- Entertainment: Olanda
- Venue: Hotel Riu Plaza Panama.
- Broadcaster: Telemetro
- Entrants: 24
- Placements: 17
- Winner: Raiza Erlenbaugh; Panamá Centro

The Miss Panamá Mundo pageant was held at the Hotel Riu Plaza Panama, Ciudad de Panamá, Panama, on April 8, 2014. About 24 contestants from all over Panamá will compete for the prestigious title. This year by decision of the international Miss World Organization, the election of the new global sovereign will be held in a separate competition to the traditional national election. Virginia Hernández Miss Panamá World 2013 crowned to Raiza Patricia Erlenbaugh Soriano as the new Miss Panamá World.

== Final result ==
=== Placements ===
Final results	Contestant
Miss Panamá World 2014	Panamá Centro - Raiza Patricia Erlenbaugh Soriano

- On November 12, 2014, Erlenbaugh was dethroned as Miss World Panamá 2014 by the Miss Panamá Organization and replaced by Nicole Pinto.

== Official contestants ==
These are the competitors who were selected for the Miss Panama World. Contestants who were part of the top 19, eliminated in the preliminary meeting on March 4, 2013 are in color.

Represents	Contestant	Age	Height	Hometown
Panamá	Stephanie Paulette González	24	1.77 m (5 ft 9 3/4 in)	Ciudad de Panamá
Colón	Keisy N. Amaya Mojica	19	1.68 m (5 ft 6 1/4 in)	Ciudad de Colón
Herrera	Larissa Lisbeth Delgado Saavedra	24	1.70 m (5 ft 7 in)	Chitre
Panamá	Leydili Marieth Caballero Domínguez	18	1.70 m (5 ft 7 in)	Ciudad de Panamá
Herrera	Lisette Gabriela Gernez Trejo	25	1.71 m (5 ft 7 1/4 in)	Ocú
Panamá	Angelica Milena Cedeño Espino	24	1.71 m (5 ft 7 1/4 in)	Ciudad de Panamá
Herrera	Elida Guadalupe Navarro Madrid	24	1.71 m (5 ft 7 1/4 in)	Pesé
Panamá	Astrid Yamileth Torres	21	1.71 m (5 ft 7 1/4 in)	Ciudad de Panamá
Chiriquí	María de los Ángeles Suarez Carrera	24	1.71 m (5 ft 7 1/4 in)	David
Colón	Lyanneth Elisa Hayot Barrett	21	1.73 m (5 ft 8 in)	Ciudad de Colón
Herrera	Katrina Enith López Gutiérrez	23	1.73 m (5 ft 8 in)	Pesé
Panamá	Astrid Yolanda Mendoza Acosta	20	1.73 m (5 ft 8 in)	Ciudad de Panamá
Panamá	Yomatzy Maurineth Hazlewood De La Rosa	22	1.73 m (5 ft 8 in)	Ciudad de Panamá
Colón	Nakeichy Cacharel Pino Yanguez	20	1.73 m (5 ft 8 in)	Ciudad de Colón
Panamá	Sara Elicia Cook Ramírez	22	1.73 m (5 ft 8 in)	Seattle, Washington
Panamá	Nicole Pinto	19	1.74 m (5 ft 8 1/2 in)	Ciudad de Panamá
Veraguas	Marisel Franco González	18	1.76 m (5 ft 9 1/4 in)	Mariato
Panama Oeste	Carmen Isabel Jaramillo	19	1.80 m (5 ft 10 3/4 in)	La Chorrera
Panamá	Gisvel Lizbeth Mena Leoteau	24	1.76 m (5 ft 9 1/4 in)	Ciudad de Panamá
Panamá	Beatriz Victoria Stein Peña	19	1.78 m (5 ft 10 in)	Ciudad de Panamá
Panamá	Raiza Patricia Erlenbaugh Soriano	22	1.77 m (5 ft 9 3/4 in)	Ciudad de Panamá
Los Santos	Carmen Librada De Gracia Navarro	23	1.80 m (5 ft 10 3/4 in)	Agua Buena
Coclé	Fidedigna Baso Duffan	20	1.81 m (5 ft 11 1/4 in)	Aguadulce
Herrera	Aileen Haydee Bernal Ardines	19	1.81 m (5 ft 11 1/4 in)	Chitre

=== Special awards ===
Award	Contestant
Miss Photogenic (Miss Fotogénica)	Raiza Patricia Erlenbaugh Soriano
Photo challenge winner (Ganadora Reto Fotográfico)	Carmen Librada De Gracia Navarro

== Judges ==
- Lourdes Cristina González - (Miss Panamá World 2001)
- Carlota Lozano - (Miss Panamá World 1967)
- Malena Bethancourt - (Miss Panamá World 1991)
- Jesenia Casanova - (Miss Panamá World 1999)
- Maria Elena Orillac - (Miss Panamá World 1986)

== Election schedule ==
(Miss Panamá World 2014)

- Monday April 7 interview with the juror.
- Tuesday April 8 Final night, coronation Miss Panamá World 2014.

(Miss Panamá Universe 2014)

- Tuesday April 8 presentation Show.
- May competition National Costume.
- Thursday 8, Final night, coronation Miss Panamá Universe 2014.

== Candidates Notes ==
- Keisy N. Amaya Mojica participated in the Miss Colón 2013, remaining as 1st Runner-up.
- Larissa Lisbeth Delgado Saavedra competed in the 2013 Miss Pacific Coast (Ecuador), where she won the band Miss Fashion Kers in 2012 and participated in the Miss Tourism Panama.
- Leydili Marieth Caballero Domínguez participated in the 2013 Miss Veraguas.
- Angelica Milena Cedeño Espinoparticipated in the Miss Tourism International Panama 2008, achieving the crown of Miss Princess of the World. Besides miss photogenic, elegance, beauty and popularity comprehensive representing Panama in Czech Republic and Hungary. In 2010 she participated in Miss Tourism Queen Panama where he was the winner representing us in Beijing, China.
- Astrid Yamileth Torres participated in the 2011 contest in the "Chico & Chica modelo", earning the title of Chica Modelo 2011.
- María de los Ángeles Suarez Carrera participated in the Miss Tourism International in 2010 and was Queen of Carnival in 2008.
- Lyanneth Elisa Hayot Barrett In 2009 was 1st Runner-up in the Miss Piel Canela, winning the title of best catwalk and girl friendship. In 2012 Miss Atlantic, was chosen as second Runner-up and won the title of best catwalk again, miss girl friendship and more creatively. In 2013 Miss Models of the World, he became 1st Runner-up and Miss Photogenic. She participated in the Miss Colón in late 2013, remaining with the Crown and Best Body.
- Astrid Yolanda Mendoza Acosta participated in the Miss Teen America and Central America Panama 2012 as 1st Runner-up of being Miss Teen Panama. In addition to the International Queen of Banana (Ecuador) and Miss Generation Models, where he remained as the winner earning the title of The Best Model of TV.
- Yomatzy Maurineth Hazlewood De La Rosa participated in contests Miss Ethnicity Black in 2013, remaining as second runner up and Miss Panama 2013 Latin Beauty winning the crown and getting the award for best silhouette.
- Nicole Pinto she competed in Miss Teen World Panama 2011.
- Marisel Franco González competed in the Miss Spring Beauty staying as 1st Runner-up and later in the Miss Veraguas, where he was the winner to represent their province in the Miss Panama 2014.
- Gisvel Lizbeth Mena Leoteau participated in the 2012 Miss Model of the World, 2013 Miss Ethnicity Black and Chica Avon 2013.
