= Bávaro =

Bavaro
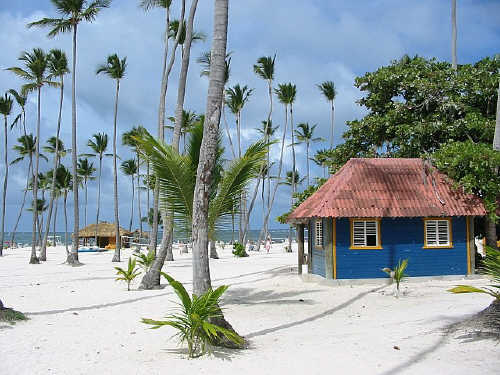
- Bavaro

- Location within the Dominican Republic
- Country: Dominican Republic
- Province: La Altagracia Province
- Municipality: Higüey

Population (2023)
  - Total: 150,000
- Time zone: UTC−4 (Atlantic)
- Postal code: 23301

Bavaro is an area of Punta Cana, located in La Altagracia province, the easternmost province of the Dominican Republic. Bávaro Beach is located on the east coast of the Dominican Republic. Along with Punta Cana and other nearby beaches, Bávaro Beach forms part of the well-known Coconut Coast, a 60-km stretch of coastline lined with coconut palms and warm waters. Bavaro was originally developed as a town for resort workers together with the resort area and tourist region of Punta Cana. As hotels started to rise along the east coast, north from Punta Cana, Bavaro itself became a center of services.

== Road network ==
Bávaro starts at a crossroad Verón, after the town of Higüey and the small village of Otra Banda, and extends 15 kilometres (9.3 mi) north until the crossroad for Macao Beach. Other beaches to the North include Uvero Alto beach, Roco Ki beach, La Vacama beach. Bavaro has 10 kilometres (6.2 mi) of sea shore.

At the center of Bávaro is the crossroad of Friusa. Beyond the crossroad Verón, on the right side is an important road to Cabeza de Toro, most eastern tip of the island of Hispaniola, and the Dominican Republic as well. The next crossroad, El Coco Loco, leads to the Friusa Centar and further points to the north.

== Infrastructure ==
The electricity is powered by Consorcio Energetico Punta Cana Macao (CEPM), a wind and solar energy producer led by US-based Argentine businessman Rolando Gonzalez-Bunster.

=== Street view ===
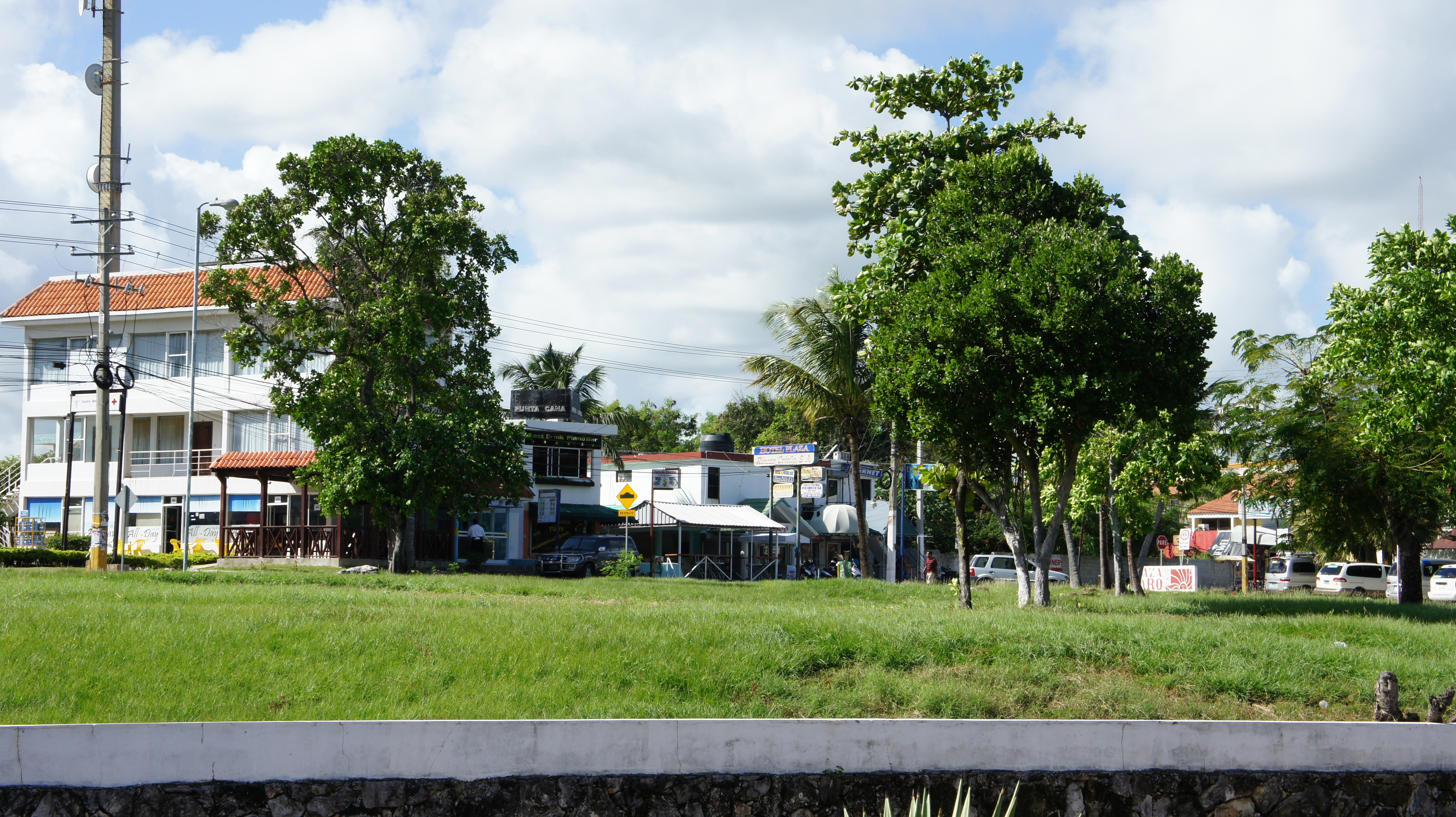

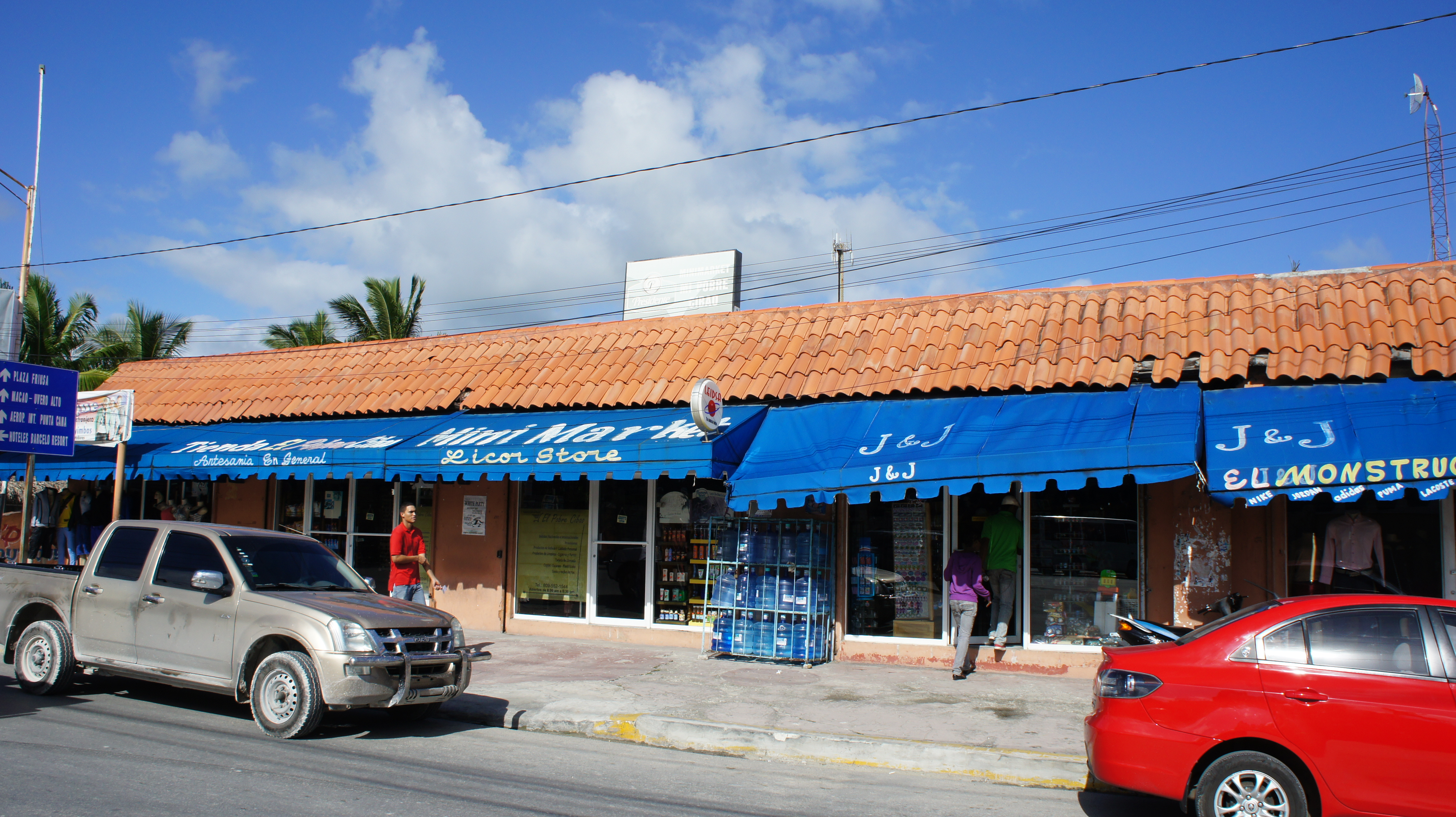

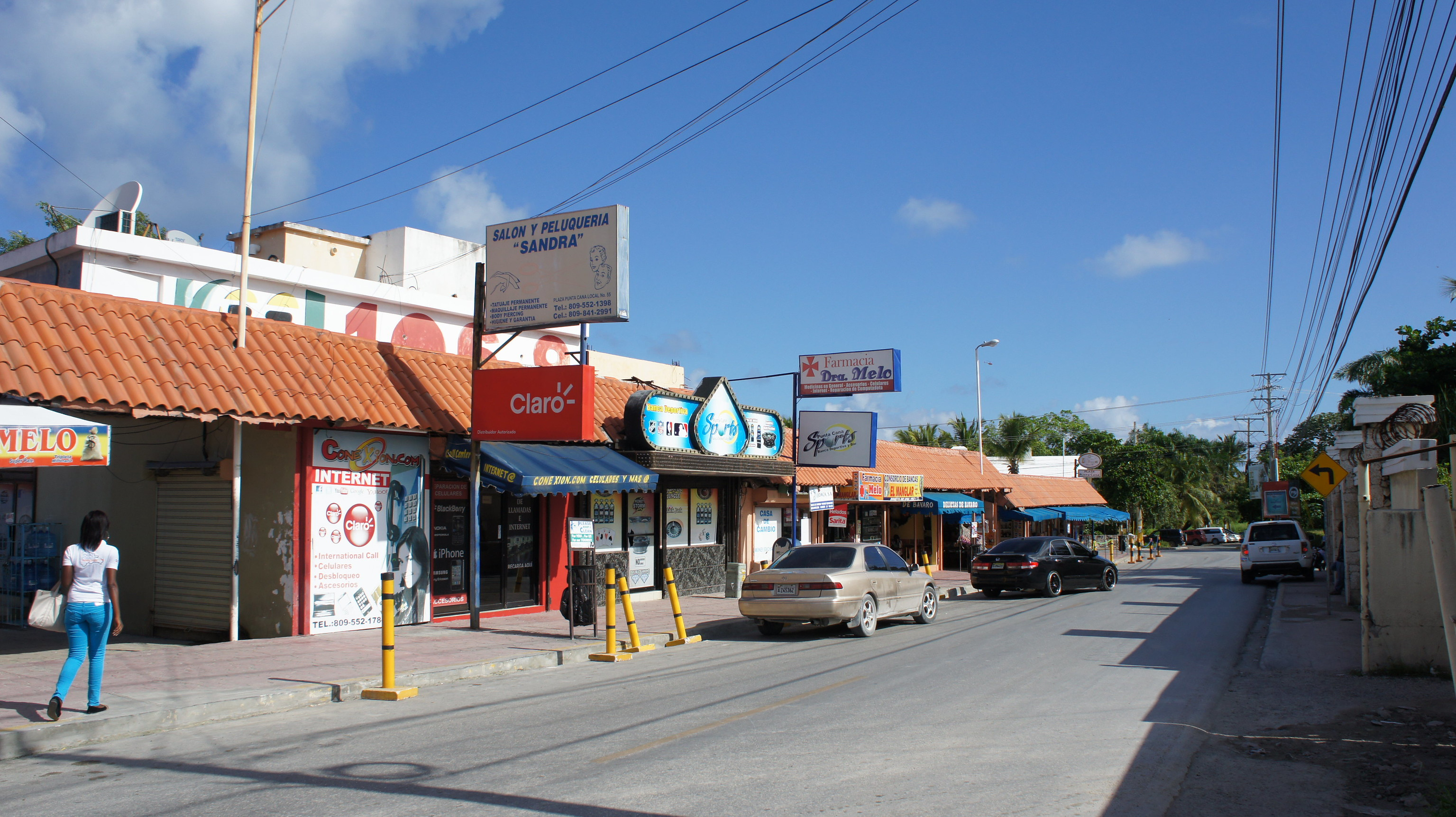

== Hotels and bars ==
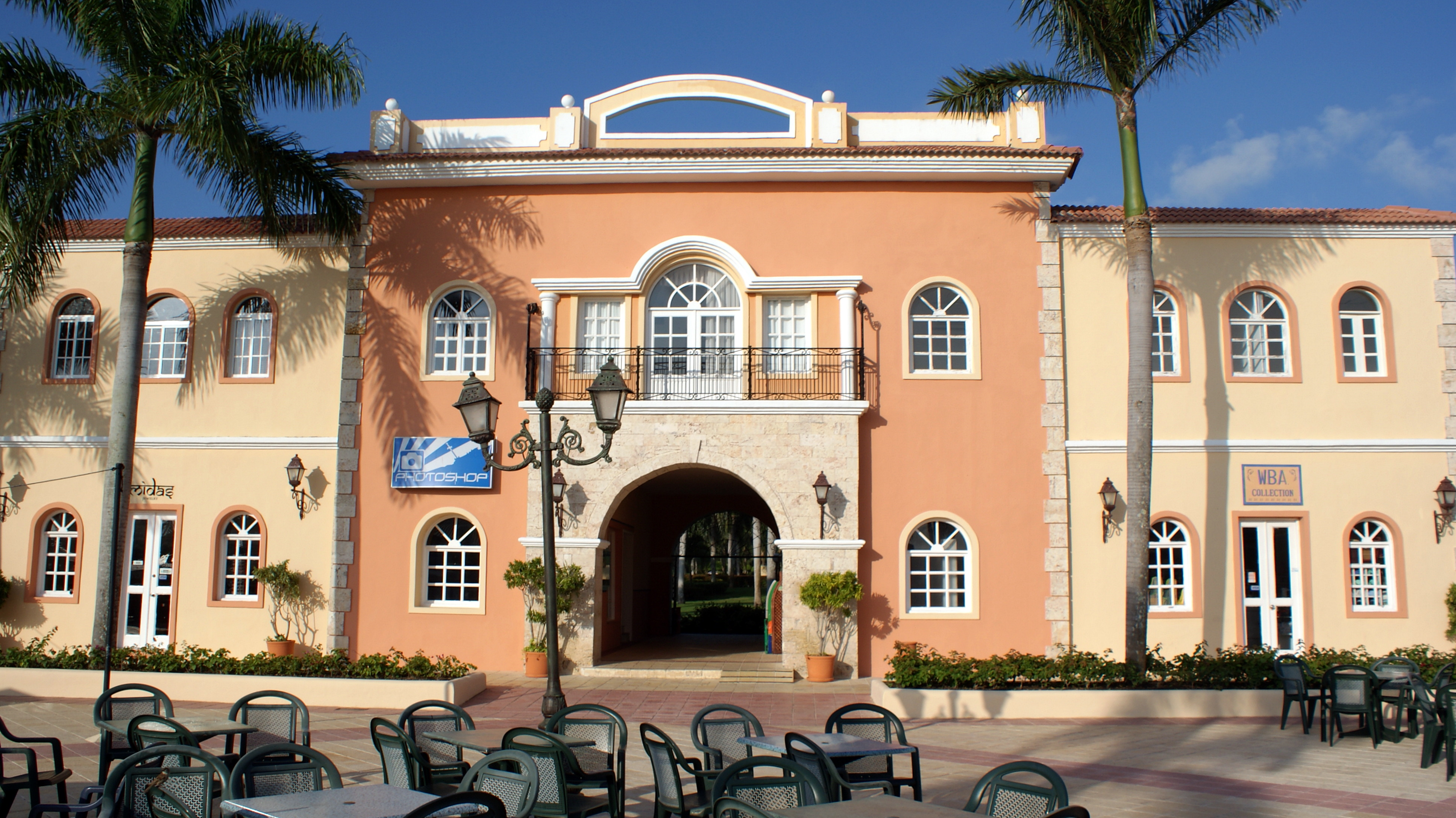
Resort area in Bavaro.

The oldest hotel in the area, Barcelo, is past the crossroad Coco Loco and Villas Bavaro I and II. One of the newest hotels is the Now Larimar Resort. The Cocotal Golf and Country Club is in front of two Melia Hotels (Paradisus Palma Real, Meliá Caribe Tropical) and the shopping mall, Plaza Palma Real. The region also features mega-resorts such as the Grand Bávaro Princess, which contributes to the area's extensive all-inclusive lodging capacity along the beachfront corridors.

Beyond the Melia Hotels is El Cortecito, the first sand road connecting Punta Cana International Airport. The oldest building in Los Corales (where El Cortecito starts) is Pirata, now home to two beach bars: Soles and Umi.

The accommodation sector in Bávaro has evolved toward high-end, all-inclusive luxury resorts, establishing the area's name as a global benchmark for hospitality quality. International hotel chains frequently integrate "Bávaro" into their branding (such as the Royalton Bávaro Resort) to leverage the destination's international prestige. These mega-resorts have significantly impacted the local economy by introducing advanced infrastructure, diverse culinary offerings, and eco-certified lodging practices. This concentrated development has transformed Bávaro from a traditional beach area into a highly competitive hub for international leisure tourism.

== Real estate ==
Tourism in Bávaro has been developing at a rapid pace. Examples include Los Corales, Cocotal and El Cortecito. All are just minutes away from the Punta Cana International Airport, where most visitors fly in.

== Other facilities ==
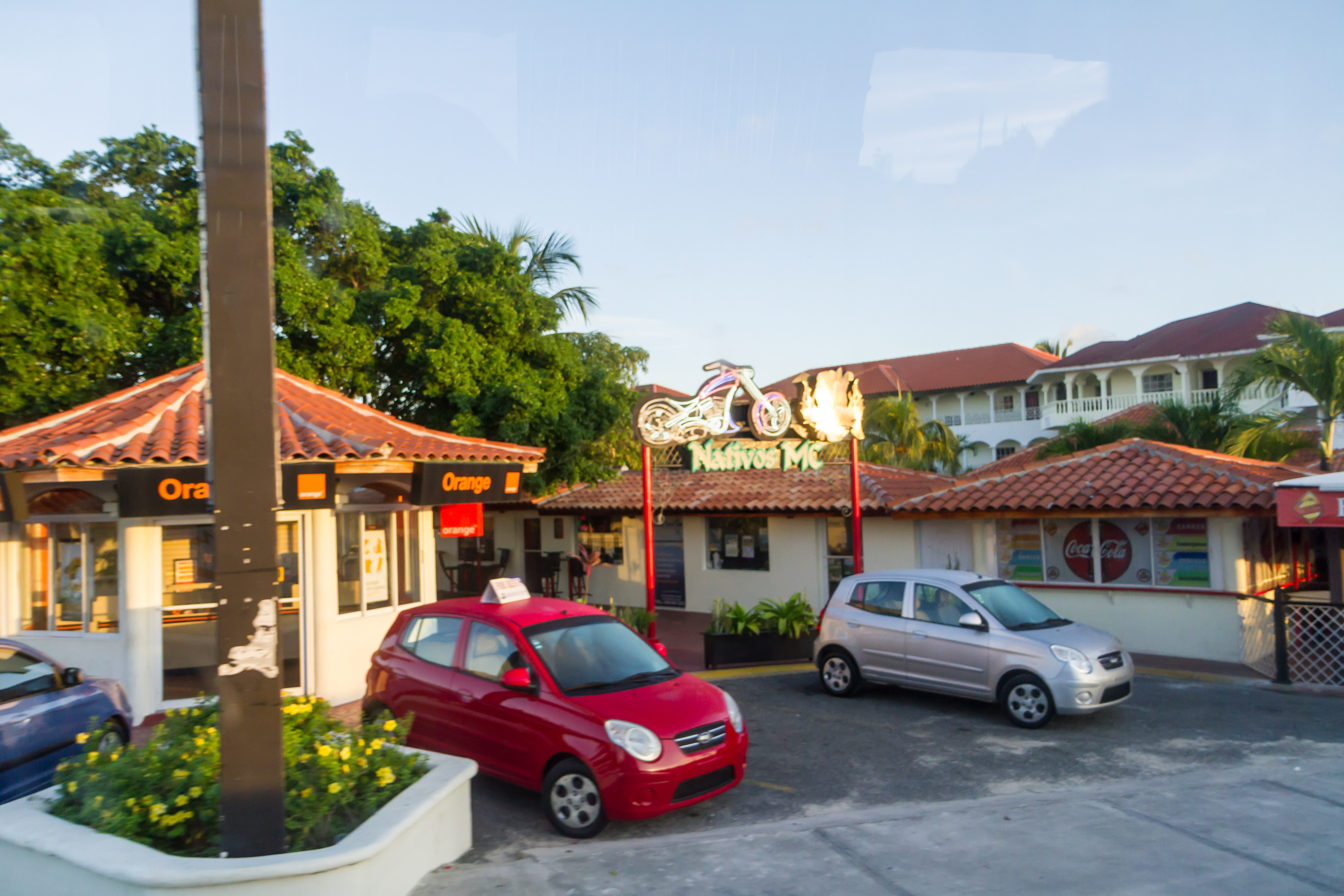
Bavaro, Dominican Republic.

The next crossroad, Plaza Bavaro, is full of gift shops, and can take you to discothèque Mangu and Areito, as well as to the White Sands golf course.

Office of Politur (Turistic Policia or Tourist Police) is next to the bus station, close to Friusa. On the part of the road from Plaza Bavaro to Friusa, there are hospitals and shopping malls with bars and restaurants. Bavaro ends at the crossroad to Macao Beach, where the Hotel RIU is located.

== Beaches ==
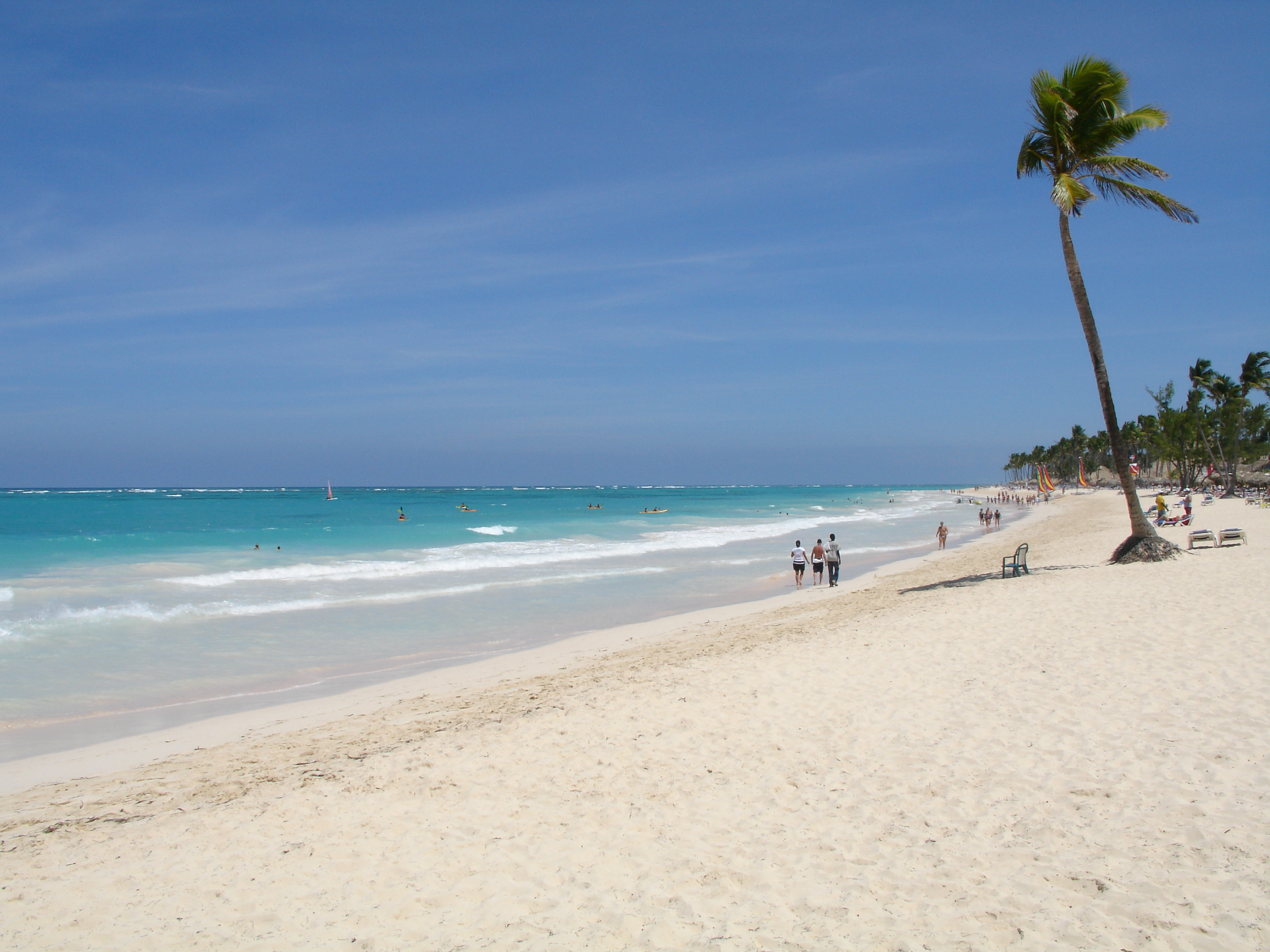

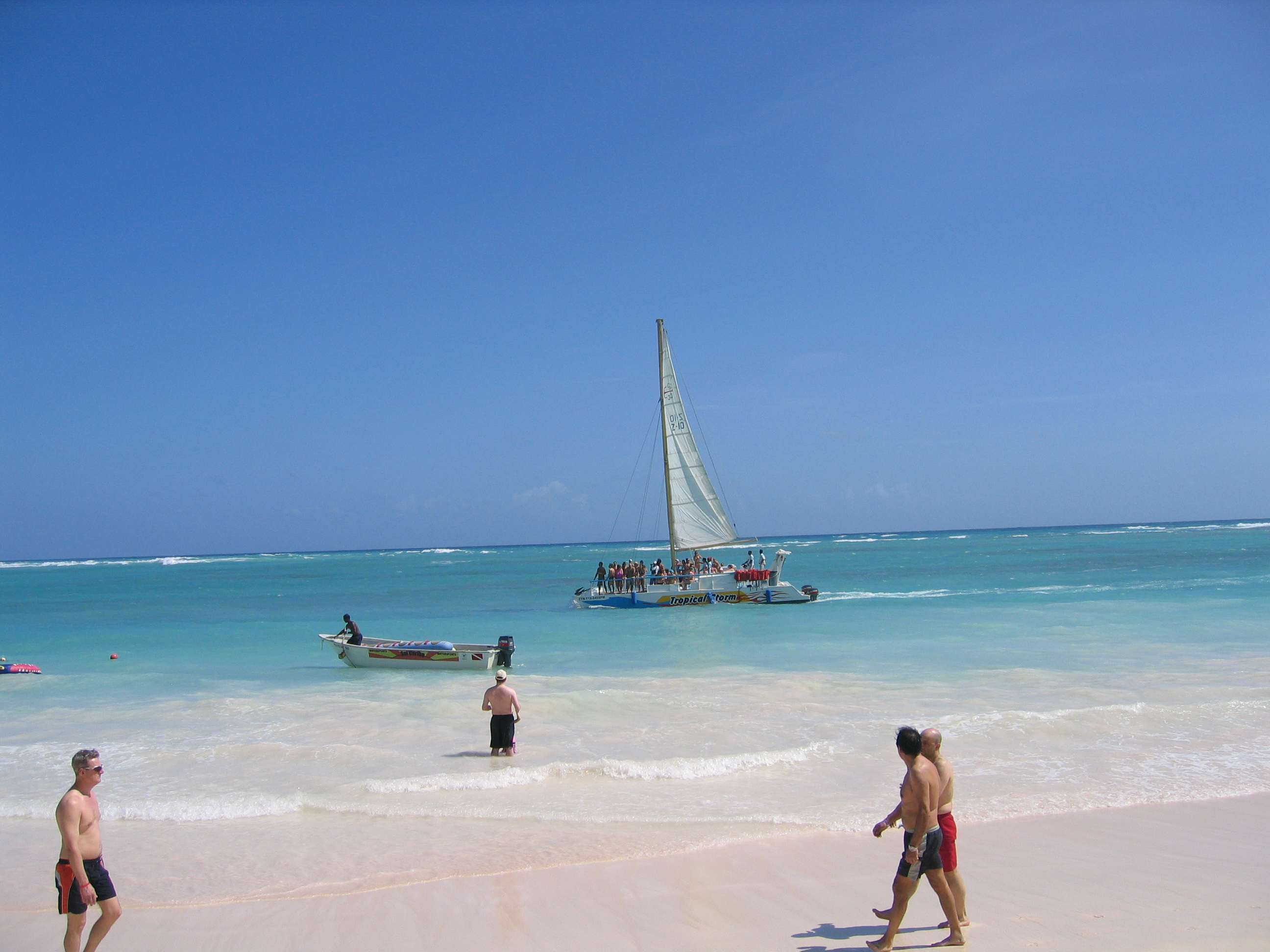
