= Dania Prince =

Honduran model and beauty queen (born 1980)

- Born: Dania Patricia Prince Méndez; February 10, 1980 (age 46); Choluteca, Honduras
- Height: 1.85 m (6 ft 1 in)
- Beauty pageant titleholder
- Title: Miss Honduras 1998; Top Model Honduras 1998; Miss Earth Honduras 2003; Miss Earth 2003
- Hair color: Black
- Eye color: Brown
- Major competitions: Miss Honduras 1998; (Winner); Miss Universe 1998; (Unplaced); Miss Earth 2003; (Winner)

Dania Patricia Prince Méndez (born February 10, 1980) is a Honduran model and beauty queen who has held the title of Miss Earth 2003.

== Life and education ==
Dania was born in Choluteca, Choluteca, Honduras. She is the third child of Andres Prince, a British merchant, and Luisa Méndez, a housewife. She obtained her bachelor's degree, majoring in international commerce.

=== Married life ===
On October 4, 2008, at the age of 28, Dania married fellow Honduran, Frank Fuentes, in a Christian ceremony at Christ Almighty church in North Miami Beach, Miami, Florida.

== Pageantry ==
=== Prior to Miss Earth ===
In 1998, Prince, who is 1.85 m tall, won the Miss Honduras pageant and went to compete as her country's representative in the Miss Universe 1998 pageant, which was won by Wendy Fitzwilliam of Trinidad and Tobago in Honolulu, Hawaii on May 12, 1998. In the 1998 Top Model of the World contest, she became a finalist and a recipient of the Best in National Costume award. She competed and won the Pacific International Queen 1998. She then went on to win Miss América Latina 2000 in November 1999 as well.

=== Miss Earth 2003 ===
In 2003, she was chosen to represent Honduras in the third edition of the international Miss Earth pageant. At the conclusion of the competition, she was crowned as Miss Earth, the third winner in the history of the competition; her triumph in Miss Earth 2003 made her as the first-ever Honduran to win a major international beauty title.

After winning the Miss Earth pageant in 2003, she recounts, “In kindergarten, my classmates chose me to become the muse of our class. But it never crossed my mind that from a class muse, I’d become Miss Earth. Nothing really is impossible in this world. To actually live a dream, you have to do something about it. Have faith in yourself first. Everything else will follow!”

As Miss Earth, she became an environmental ambassador in the Philippines, she addressed environmental issues and spearheaded activities such as the “Caravan for Mother Earth with Miss Earth” in lined with the advocacy program by the Office of the Executive Secretary of the Philippines for North Luzon (OPNL) entitled “Go North: The Ocean and Jungle Escapade.”

When asked by the media how she would differentiate Miss Universe from Miss Earth pageant, she stated, “Beauty, body, and brains of the candidates are given a lot of emphasis in Miss Universe and it is more commercialized. On the other hand, Miss Earth is cause-oriented. If you can still recall, a lot of beautiful and popular candidates from countries that usually win in international pageants surprisingly didn’t make it in the semifinal round of Miss Earth last year. The judges, most likely, were looking for the ‘sincerity factor’ rather than the ‘X-factor’ in a candidate, which perhaps they saw in me.”

Awards and achievements
Preceded by (Kenya) Winfred Omwakwe	Miss Earth; 2003	Succeeded by (Brazil) Priscilla Meirelles
Preceded by Leslie Paredes	Miss Earth Honduras; 2003	Succeeded by Gabriela Zavala
Preceded by Joselina García	Miss Honduras; 1998	Succeeded by Daryela Guerrero
