= Now Larimar Resort =

Building in Punta Cana, Dominican Republic

Coordinates: 18.6800°N 68.4158°W

Now Larimar Punta Cana
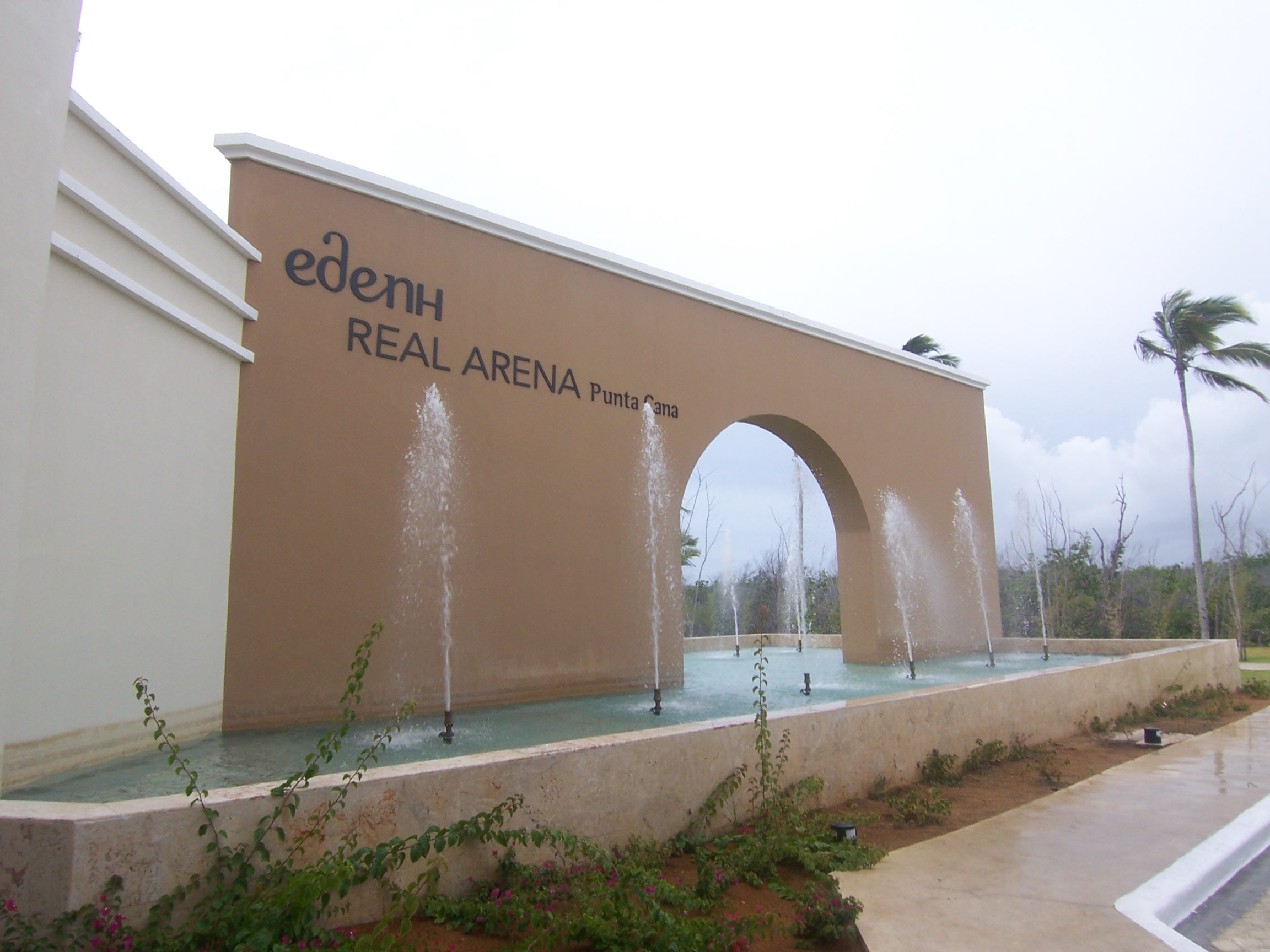
- Resort entrance, under the former name EdenH Real Arena
- Interactive map of the Now Larimar Punta Cana area

General information
- Location: Bavaro Beach in Punta Cana, Dominican Republic
- Opening: 2007

Technical details
- Floor count: 4

Other information
- Number of rooms: 658
- Number of suites: 38
- Number of restaurants: 6

Website
- http://nowresorts.com/larimar/

Now Larimar Punta Cana is a former resort that was located on Bavaro Beach Punta Cana, Dominican Republic. It opened in late 2007. The resort sat on Bavaro Beach, which shares many other resort hotels. The resort, formally known as the EdenH Real Arena Resort, was operated by Now Resorts. The property is now owned and operated by Hyatt, as the Dreams Royal Beach Resort.

== Rooms ==
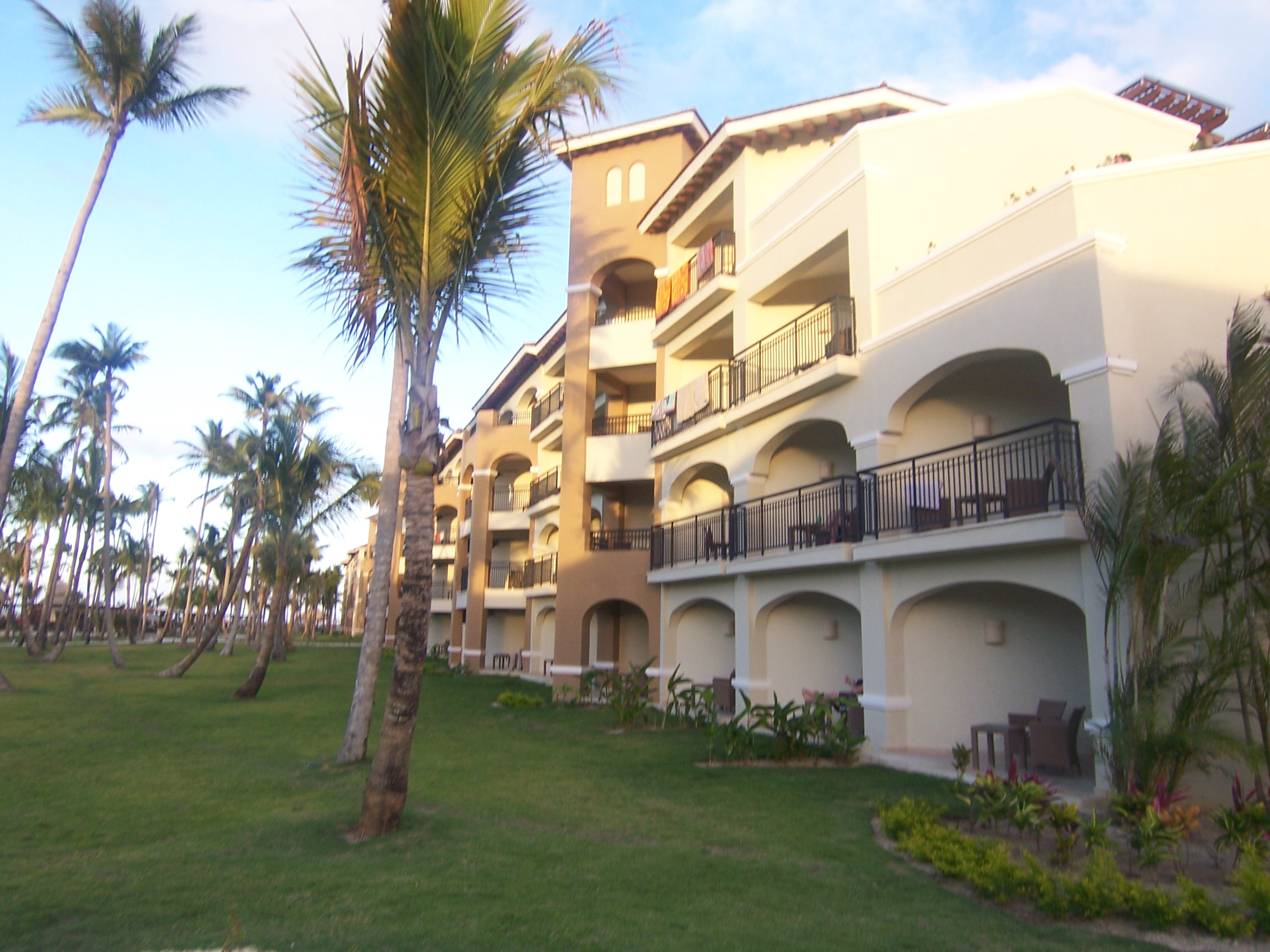
One of the two buildings that has guest rooms

There were 658 rooms. There were three types of rooms: Deluxe Rooms, Paradise Club Rooms, and 38 suites. The rooms were located in two parallel buildings that each have four floors.

== Facilities ==
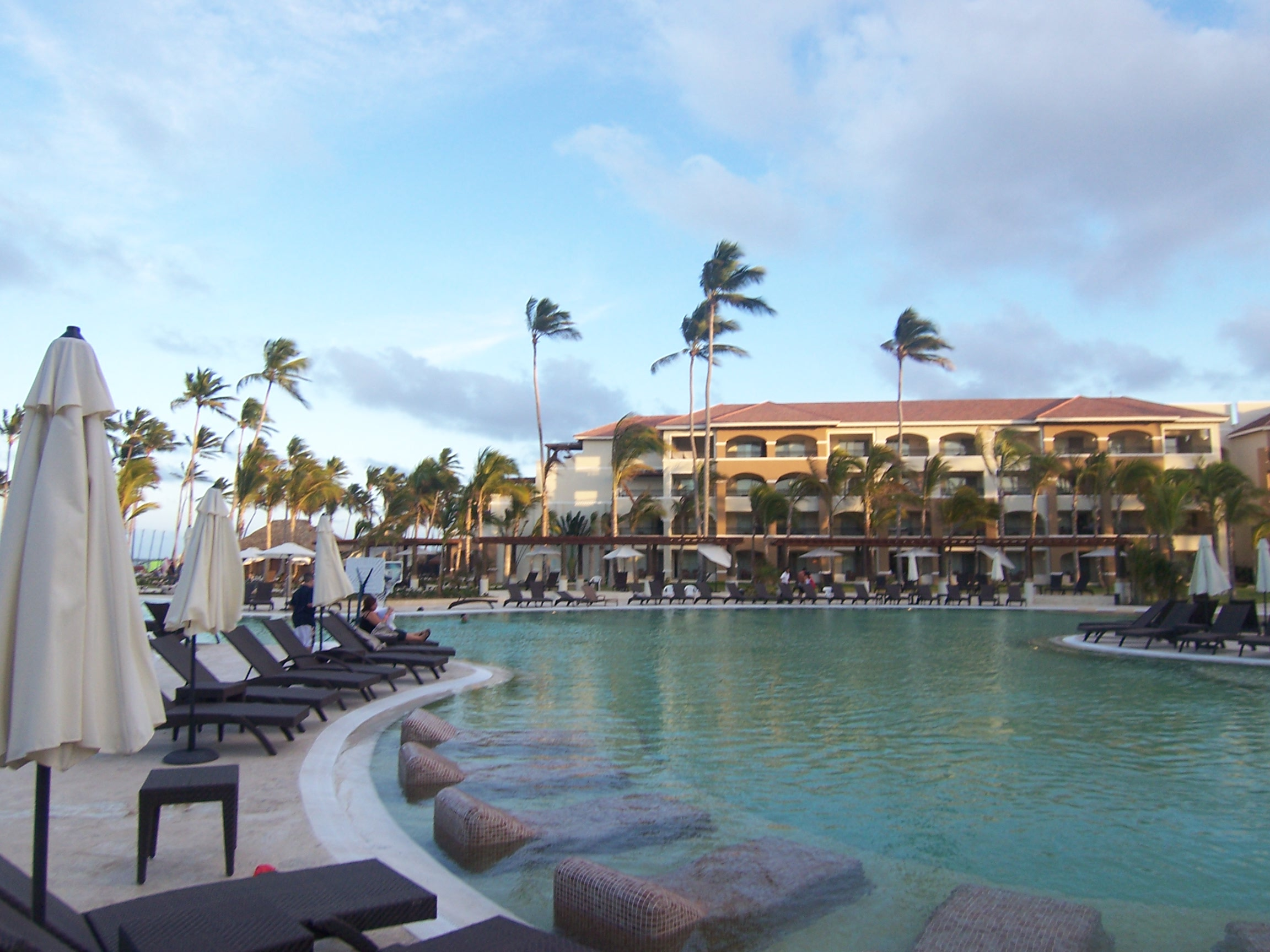
A view of the main pool

Facilities included five swimming pools, six restaurants, eight bars, one casino, a spa, Kids Club, Teens Club, gym and exercise center, Internet lounge, basketball courts, two tennis courts, volleyball courts on the pool and beach, bowling lanes, life-size chess games at the pool, conference and banquet facilities for up to 700 people, dry cleaning and laundry facilities, and lounge chairs were available at the beach and pools.
