= Montelimar Beach =

Beach in western Nicaragua

Coordinates: 11.8063°N 86.5254°W

View of the Montelimar beach and Barcelo Hotel and Resort of Nicaragua's Pacific coast in Managua.

Montelimar is a beach located on the Pacific coast of Nicaragua in the department of Managua. Montelimar consists of 3 km of white sand beach. The main tourist attraction is the Barcelo Hotel and Resort. The current location of the Barcelo hotel and resort is the old Somoza Estate, the actual home has been transformed into a Casino that overlooks the Pacific Ocean.

The land was originally owned by German immigrants and was confiscated by the Somoza dynasty after they declared war on Germany during World War II, even though no fighting took place between the two countries.
