= Nicole Pinto =

Panamanian model (born 1995)

- Born: 1995 (age 30–31); Panama City, Panama
- Beauty pageant titleholder
- Title: Miss World Panamá 2014
- Hair color: Black
- Eye color: Brown
- Major competitions: Miss World Panamá 2014 (1st runner up); Miss Latin America 2014 (Winner/Relinquished the title); Miss World 2014 (Unplaced)

Nicole Pinto (born 1995) is a Panamanian model and beauty pageant titleholder. She was the 1st runner up at Miss Panama World 2014. she represented Panama at Miss World 2014.

== Miss Panamá World 2014 ==
She is the 1st runner up at the Miss Panamá 2014.

== Miss Latin America 2014 ==
Nicole Pinto participated in the 28th edition of the Miss Latin America that took place on September 6, 2014 at the Barceló Bávaro Beach Resort in Punta Cana, Dominican Republic, where she competed with 23 candidates from different countries and where she was crowned by Julia Guerra from Brazil as Miss Latin America 2014.

However, on November 14, 2014, the decision of Nicole Pinto, to cede the title of Miss America Latina 2014, to be the representative of Panama in Miss World 2014 after the dismissal of Raiza Erlenbaugh became public, being that Nicole was the finalist of the Miss Panamá 2014.

== Miss World 2014 ==
She represented Panama in the 64th edition of the Miss World pageant held on December 14 at ExCeL London in London.

Awards and achievements
Preceded by Raiza Erlenbaugh	Miss Panamá World; 2014–2015	Succeeded by Diana Jaén
Preceded by (Brazil) Julia Guerra	Miss Latin America; 2014 (He renounced the title)	Succeeded by (Spain) Yanire Ortiz (Successor)
