= List of Señorita Panamá titleholders =

The following is a list of women who have held the Señorita Panamá (Miss Panamá) title.

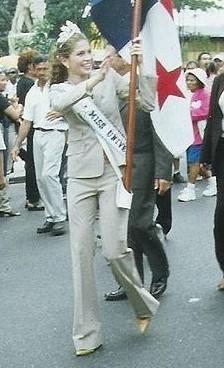
Justine Pasek, Señorita Panamá 2001 & Miss Universe 2002

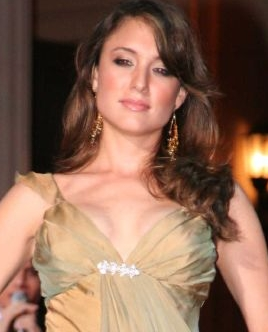
Stefanie de Roux, Señorita Panamá 2002

== Representatives to Miss Universe ==
Señorita Panamá winners who have gone on to become Miss Universe are in bold.

Winners

**Miss Panamá**
Year	Titleholder	State	Placement at Miss Universe	DoB/Age
1952	Elzibir Gisela Malek	Coclé		1934
1953	Emita Arosemena Zubieta†	Los Santos	Semifinalist (12th)	
1954	Liliana Torre	Panamá Centro	Semifinalist (12th)	
1955–1963	No contests			
1964	Maritza Montilla	Coclé		
1965	Sonia Inés Ríos†(2007)	Colón		
1966	Dionisia Broce	Los Santos		
1967	Mirna Norma Castillero	Herrera		
1968–1969	No contests			
1970	Berta López Herrera	Veraguas		
1971	Gladys Isaza	Panamá Centro		
1972	No contests			
1973	Janine Lizuaín	Panamá Centro		
1974	Jazmín Nereida Panay	Panamá Centro	Semifinalist (9th)	April 17, 1954
1975	Anina Horta Torrijos	Panamá Centro		
1976	Carolina Maria Chiari	Panamá Centro		
1977	Marina Valenciano	Los Santos		
1978	Diana Leticia Conte Vergara	Panamá Centro		
1979	Yahel Cecile Dolande	Panamá Centro	1955	
1980	Gloria Karamañites Davis	Colón	Semifinalist (9th)	December 24, 1960
1981	Ana María Henríquez Valdés	Panamá Centro		
1982	Isora de Lourdes Moreno López	Panamá Centro		
1983	Elizabeth Bylan Bennett	Panamá Centro		
1984	Cilinia Prada Acosta	Panamá Centro		
1985	Janett Ibeth Vásquez Sanjur	Panamá Centro		
1986	Gilda García López	Veraguas		1965
1987	Gabriela Deleuze Ducasa	Los Santos		1965
1988–1989	No contests			
**Señorita Panamá**
1990	Liz Michelle De León Paz	Panamá Centro		December 2, 1969
1991	Ana Cecilia Orillac Arias	Panamá Centro		March 1, 1970
1992	Giselle Amelia González Aranda	Veraguas		
1993	María Sofía Velásquez Jaimes-Freyre	Panamá Centro		1971
1994	Michele Jeanette Sage Navarrete	Panamá Centro	(18th)	November 12, 1973
1995	Reyna del Carmen Royo Rivera	Panamá Centro		March 15, 1971
1996	Lía Victoria Borrero González	Los Santos	Finalist (Top 6) (6)	August 22, 1976
1997	Tanisha Tamara Drummond Johnson	Colón		August 3, 1976
1998	Yamani Esther Saied Calviño	Panamá Centro	(18th)	May 12, 1977
1999	Analía Verónica Núñez Sagripanti	Chiriquí	(12th)	June 4, 1980
2000	Ivette María Cordovez Usuga	Panamá Centro		June 24, 1980
**2001**	**Justine Lissette Pasek Patiño**	**Panamá Centro**	**Miss Universe 2002** (Note: Pasek originally placed 1st runner-up, but having ascended into the throne after Oxana Fedorova dethroned the Miss Universe title.)	**August 29, 1979**
2002	Stefanie de Roux Martín	Panamá Centro	Semifinalist (Top 15) (13th)	August 5, 1982
2003	Jessica Patricia Rodríguez Clark	Panamá Centro		September 18, 1981
2004	Rosa María Hernández Cedeño	Los Santos		July 29, 1983
2005	María Alessandra Mezquita Lapadula	Panamá Centro		November 1, 1983
2007	Sorangel Matos Arce*	Darien		January 2, 1986
**Realmente Bella**
2008	Carolina Dementiev Justavino	Panamá Centro		February 1, 1989
2009	Diana Patricia Broce Bravo	Los Santos		July 26, 1986
**Señorita Panamá**
2010	Anyoli Amorette Abrego Sanjur	Veraguas		November 16, 1987
**Miss Panamá**
2011	Sheldry Nazareth Sáez Bustavino	Herrera	Finalist (Top 10)	January 15, 1992
2012	Stephanie Marie Vander Werf Lobato	Panamá Centro		October 26, 1986
2013	Carolina Del Carmen Brid Cerrud	Veraguas		July 4, 1990
2014	Yomatzy Maurineth Hazlewood De La Rosa	Darien		April 3, 1991
2015	Gladys Del Carmen Brandao Amaya	Los Santos		March 27, 1991
**Señorita Panamá**
2016	Keity Drennan Mendieta Britton	Panamá Centro	Semifinalist (Top 13)	July 24, 1990
2017	Laura Sofía de Sanctis Natera	Contadora		June 25, 1997
2018	Rosa Iveth Montezuma Montero	Comarcas		May 16, 1993
2019	Mehr Eliezer	Flamenco		January 16, 1997
2020	Carmen Isabel Jaramillo	Panamá Este		December 26, 1994
2021	Brenda Andrea Smith Lezama	Panamá Centro	Semifinalist (Top 16)	May 25, 1994
**Miss Universe Panamá**
2022	Solaris De la Luna Barba Cañizales	Herrera		March 1, 1999
2023	Natasha Lineth Vargas Moreno	Los Santos		July 1, 1997
2024	Italy Johan Peñaloza Mora	Riviera del Canal		2005
2025	Mirna Alejandra Caballini Bouche	Chiriquí		
2026	Gabriela Lineth González	Chiriquí	TBA	

=== Regional rankings ===
Titles	State	Winning years
29	Panamá Centro	1954; 1971; 1973; 1974; 1975; 1976; 1978; 1979; 1981; 1982; 1983; 1985; 1984; 1990; 1991; 1993; 1994; 1995; 1998; 2000; 2001; 2002; 2003; 2005; 2006; 2008; 2012; 2016; 2021
9	Los Santos	1953; 1966; 1977; 1987; 1996; 2004; 2009; 2015; 2023
5	Veraguas	1970; 1986; 1992; 2010; 2013
3	Herrera	1967; 2011; 2022
3	Colón	1965; 1980; 1997
2	Darién	2007; 2014
2	Coclé	1952; 1964
1	Riviera del Canal	2024
1	Panamá Este	2020
1	Flamenco	2019
1	Comarcas	2018
1	Contadora	2017
1	Chiriquí	1999
0	Bocas del Toro	
0	Panamá Oeste	
0	Chiriquí Occidente	

The regional ranking is established according to the state of origin or representation of the miss (Miss Universe) and the year they won the title.

Notes:

The regional ranking is established according to the state of origin or representation of the miss and the year they won the title.

- In the 2007 Sorangel Matos competed for Panama in Miss Universe 2007. She was 1st Runner-Up of the Señorita Panamá 2006 pageant

== Representatives to Miss World ==
Miss Panamá Mundo
Year	Titleholder	State	Placement at Miss World	DoB/Age
1967	Carlota Lozano	Colón		September 7, 1945
1971	Maria de Lourdes Rivera			
1977	Anabelle Vallarino			
1979	Lorelay de la Ossa		Top 15	
1980	Aurea Horta Torrijos			
Señorita Panamá World
1982	Lorena Moreno			
1983	Marissa Burgos Canalías	Herrera	4th Runner-Up	
1984	Ana Luisa Sedda Reyes			
1985	Diana Esther Alfaro Arosemena			
1986	María Lorena Orillac Giraldo		Top 10	
1987	María Cordelia Denis Urriola			
1989	Gloria Stella Quintana	Panamá Centro		January 18, 1970
1990	Madelaine Leignadier Dawson			
1991	Malena Estela Betancourt Guillén			
1992	Michelle Marie Harrington Hasbún			
1993	Aracelys Cogley Prestán	Colón		
1994	Carmen Lucia Ogando Giono	Colón		
1995	Marisela Moreno Montero	Panamá Centro		August 7, 1973
1996	Norma Elida Pérez Rodriguez			
1997	Patricia Aurora Bremner Hernández			
1998	Lorena del Carmen Zagía Miró			
1999	Jessenia Casanova Reyes			
2000	Ana Raquel Ochy Pozo			
2001	Lourdes Cristina González Montenegro	Los Santos		
2002	Yoselín Sánchez Espino			
Miss World Panamá
2003	Ivy Ruth Coronas			
Señorita Panamá World
2004	Melissa Piedrahita Meléndez	Panamá Centro		April 22, 1982
2005	Anna Isabella Vaprio Medaglia	Panamá Centro		
2006	Giselle Marie Bissot Kieswetter	Panamá Centro		
Miss World Panamá
2007	Shey Ling Him	Coclé		
2008	Kathia Katiuska Saldaña Ortega	Panamá Centro	Withdrew	
Señorita Panamá World
2009	Nadege Helena Herrera Vasquez	Panamá Centro	5th Runner-Up	November 17, 1986
Miss World Panamá
2010	Paola Alessandra Vaprio Medaglia	Panamá Centro		June 12, 1987
Miss Panamá World
2011	Irene Del Carmen Núñez Quintero	Veraguas		June 11, 1987
2012	Maricely Del Carmen González Pomares	Bocas del Toro	Top 30	February 28, 1988
2013	Virginia Isabel Hernández Milachay	Panamá Centro		May 26, 1990
2014	Raiza Patricia Erlenbaugh Soriano	Panamá Centro	Dethroned	March 6, 1991
2014	Nicole Pinto	Panama Oeste		1995
2015	Diana Doris Jaén Ortega	Coclé		April 28, 1992
Señorita Panamá World
2016	Alessandra Camila Bueno Fontaine	Panamá Centro		November 21, 1991
2017	Julianne Brittón	Taboga		August 1, 1995
2018	Solaris De la Luna Barba Cañizales	Herrera	Top 12	March 1, 1999
Miss World Panamá
2019	Agustina Ruiz Arrechea	Herrera		
2020	Due to the impact of COVID-19 pandemic, no pageant in 2020			
2021	Krysthelle Barreto Reichlin	Panamá Centro		May 18, 1995
2022	Miss World 2021 was rescheduled to 16 March 2022 due to the COVID-19 pandemic outbreak in Puerto Rico, no edition started in 2022			
2023	Kathleen Pérez Coffre	Bocas del Toro		
2024	Due to the delay of Miss World 2023, no edition started in 2024			
2025	Karol Rodriguez	Panamá Norte	Top 40	
2026	Madeline Elena Miller	Panamá Norte	TBA	TBA
