= List of Miss Panamá – Señorita Panamá editions =

This is a chronological list of Señorita Panamá beauty pageants.

Year	Edition	Finals Date	Finals Venue	No of Contestants
Miss Panamá
1952	1st		Hotel El Panamá, Ciudad de Panamá	20
1953	2nd			
1954–63	3rd			
1964	4th			
1965	5th			
1966	6th			
1967–69	7th			
1970	8th			
1971–72	9th			
1973	10th			
1974	11th			
1975	12th			
1976	13th			
1977	14th			
1978	15th			
1979	16th			
1980	17th			
1981	18th			
1982	19th			
1983	20th			
1984	21st			
1985	22nd			
1986	23rd			
1987	24th			
Señorita Panamá
1982	1st			
1983	2nd			
1984	3rd			
1985	4th			
1986	5th			
1987–88	6th			
1989	7th			
1990	8th			
1991	9th		Teatro Anayansi Centro de Convenciones Atlapa, Ciudad de Panamá	14
1992	10th	15 August	Teatro Anayansi Centro de Convenciones Atlapa, Ciudad de Panamá	15
1993	11th		Teatro Anayansi Centro de Convenciones Atlapa, Ciudad de Panamá	16
1994	12th	3 September	Teatro Anayansi Centro de Convenciones Atlapa, Ciudad de Panamá	16
1995	13th	September	Teatro Anayansi Centro de Convenciones Atlapa, Ciudad de Panamá	16
1996	14th	September	Teatro Anayansi Centro de Convenciones Atlapa, Ciudad de Panamá	13
1997	15th	September	Teatro Anayansi Centro de Convenciones Atlapa, Ciudad de Panamá	14
1998	16th	September	Teatro Anayansi Centro de Convenciones Atlapa, Ciudad de Panamá	13
1999	17th	September	Teatro Anayansi Centro de Convenciones Atlapa, Ciudad de Panamá	12
2000	18th	1 September	Teatro Anayansi Centro de Convenciones Atlapa, Ciudad de Panamá	12
2001	19th	30 August	Gran Salón Hotel Continental, Ciudad de Panamá	12
2002	20th	6 September	Centro de Convenciones Vasco Núñez, Ciudad de Panamá	14
2003	21st	26 November	Figali Convention Center, Ciudad de Panamá	11
2004	22nd	11 September	Teatro Nacional de Panamá, Ciudad de Panamá	12
2005	23rd	24 September	Centro de Convenciones Vasco Núñez – Hotel El Panamá, Ciudad de Panamá	15
2006–07	24th	19 July	Gran Salón del Hotel & Casino Venetto, Ciudad de Panamá	9
2008	25th	26 May	Studio "B" de Canal 13 Telemetro, Ciudad de Panamá	10
2009	26th	15 May	Tihany Spectacular, Ciudad de Panamá	10
2010	27th	8 July	Sheraton Hotel, Ciudad de Panamá	10
Miss Panamá
2011	1st	26 May	Teatro Anayansi Centro de Convenciones Atlapa, Ciudad de Panamá	12
2012	2nd	30 March	Hotel Riu Plaza Panamá, Ciudad de Panamá	12
2013	3rd	30 April	Teatro Anayansi Centro de Convenciones Atlapa, Ciudad de Panamá	13
2014	4th	7 April	Hotel Riu Plaza Panama, Ciudad de Panamá, Panama	16
2015	5th	24 August	Hard Rock Hotel & Cafe Megapolis Panama	30
Señorita Panamá
2016	1st	26 April	Trump Ocean Club International Hotel and Tower	30
2017	2nd	25 August	Teatro Anayansi Centro de Convenciones Atlapa, Ciudad de Panamá	20
2018	3rd	7 June	Roberto Durán Arena, Ciudad de Panamá	20
2019	4th	20 June	Arena Roberto Durán, Ciudad de Panamá	24
2020	5th	11 August	Estudios de Telemetro, Ciudad de Panamá	4
2021	6th	7 November	Wyndham Panama Albrook Mall Hotel & Convention Cente, Ciudad de Panamá	29
Miss Panamá
2022	1st	2 September	Centro de Convenciones Vasco Núñez de Balboa, Ciudad de Panamá	10
2023	2nd	13 September	Teatro Anayansi Centro de Convenciones Atlapa, Ciudad de Panamá	15
Señorita Panamá
2024–25	1st	3 August	Figali Convention Center, Ciudad de Panamá	24
2026	2nd	5 September	Roberto Durán Arena, Ciudad de Panamá	27
