= Lamar Bailey Karamañites =

Panamanian filmmaker activist and educator

- Born: Lamar Bailey Karamañites; Panama City, Panama
- Education: Baruch College; Universidad Politécnica de Valencia; Harvard University
- Occupations: Filmmaker; Educator
- Years active: 2021–present
- Mother: Gloria Karamañites

Lamar Bailey Karamañites is a Panamanian filmmaker, educator and an activist in the Afro-Panamanian social movement. She is known for her film Miss Panama (2021).

== Career ==
Lamar Bailey Karamañites graduated from the Baruch College (CUNY) in 2010 with a degree in Marketing and completed a Masters program in Development and Cooperation from the Universidad Politécnica de Valencia, in Valencia, Spain in 2021. She graduated from the Centro de Estudios Afrolatinoamericanos (ALARI) through the Hutchins Center at Harvard University.

From 2014 to 2019, she worked as a teacher in Panama City, teaching English, History, and Human Geography with a focus on human rights, utilizing the Multiple Intelligences Methodology and an inclusive teaching approach.

In Panama, Karamañites was a member of the Afro-Panamanian Youth Network and is currently a member of Voices of Afro-descendant Women in Panama (VOMAP) and the Afro-Panamanian Forum. While living in Spain, Karamañites was a co-founder of Uhuru, also known as Uhuru Valencia, an organization with the stated goal of fighting against anti-black racism and creating a community of Black, African, Afrodescendant and Afro-European people of all ages and origins.

In 2021, she codirected the documentary short film Miss Panama (2021), which had a world premiere at the Tribeca International Film Festival in 2021. Her codirectors were Pascale Boucicaut (Haitian-American filmmaker, folklorist, and anthropologist) and David Felix Sutcliffe (US American filmmaker and activist).

In May 2022 Karamañites participated in Afrodiastories alongside filmmaker and historian Dash Harris Machado. Afrodiastories was a radio project through NPR and LAist Studios's audio lab, Oye: The Lab for Latinx Creators, with the goal of promoting the full inclusion of Afro-Panamanians into the national narrative of Panamanian identity by highlighting the achievements of the Afro-Panamanian youth.

In 2022, Karamañites joined the International Service for Human Rights as a Coalition Coordinator. She is currently a manager for the UN Coalition Against Racism (UNARC). Through UNARC, Karamañites is a part of the Implementation Team for the Decade of People of African Descent in Spain 2015-2024.

== Personal life ==
Karamañites is the daughter of Gloria Karamañites, who became the first Black woman to be named Miss Panama in 1980, and was the subject of Lamar's first documentary, Miss Panama (2021).
