= Miss World Panamá 2022 =

Edition of beauty pageant

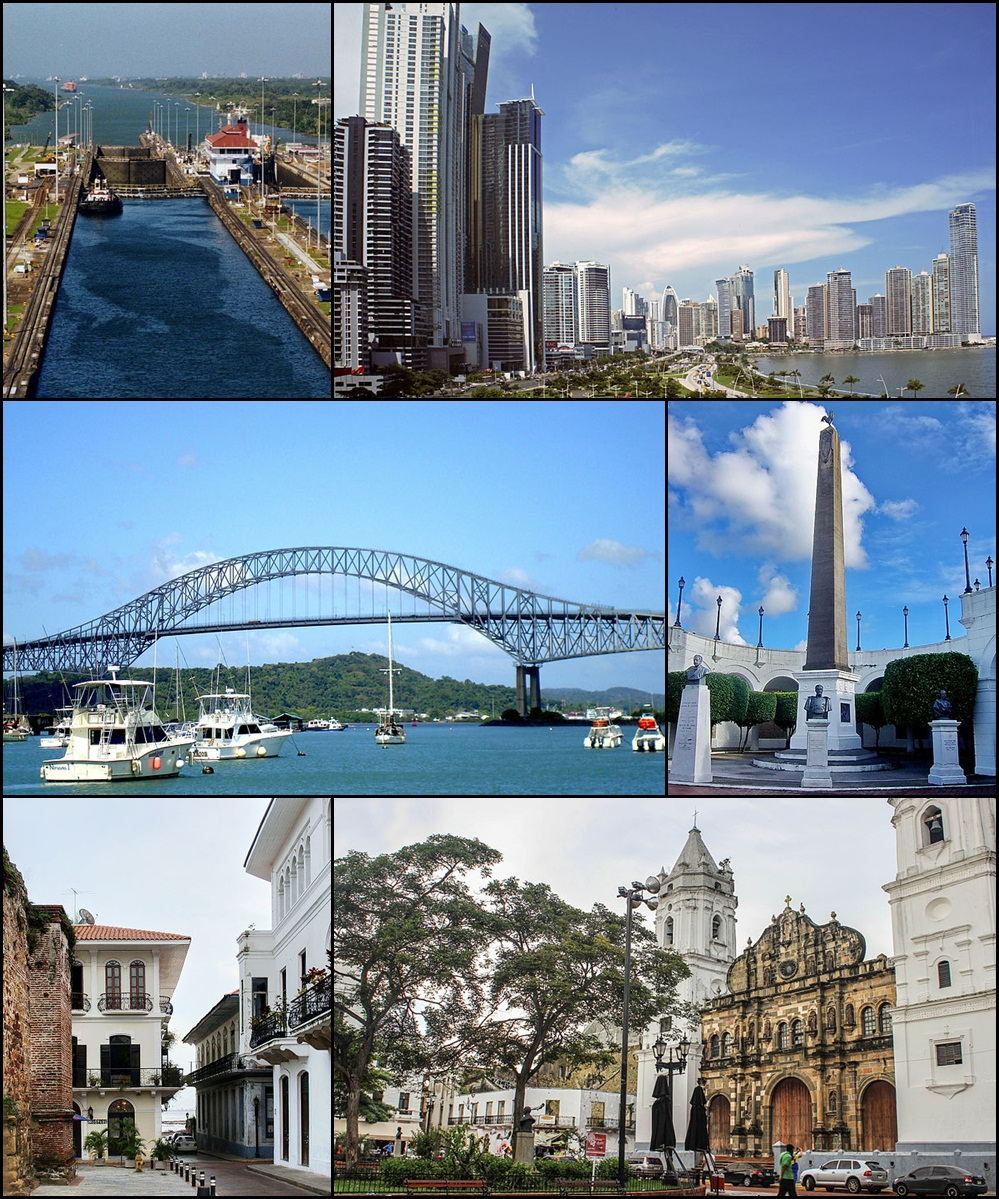
- Date: April 24, 2022
- Presenters: Carmen Drayton
- Venue: Teatro Balboa, Ciudad de Panamá, Panama
- Broadcaster: Instagram
- Entrants: 19
- Placements: 11
- Winner: Kathleen Pérez Coffre; Bocas del Toro

Miss World Panamá 2022 was the 9th Miss World Panamá pageant, to select Panama's representative to the Miss World pageant.

Nineteen preliminary contestants were selected from all over Panama and competed for the crown. Miss World Panamá 2020 Krysthelle Barreto Reichlin of Panamá Centro crowned Kathleen Pérez Coffre of Bocas del Toro as her successor at the end of the event.

Kathleen Pérez Miss World Panamá 2022 will compete at Miss World 2022 pageant.

== Final results ==
Final results	Contestant
Miss World Panamá 2022	Bocas del Toro - Kathleen Pérez Coffre
1st runner-up	Penonome – Diana Martínez
2nd runner-up	Darién – Angie Paz
3rd runner-up	Colón – Chelsea Bailey
4th runner-up	Taboga – Anyelid Herazo
Top 11 Semi-Finalist	Chiriquí – Yenifer Vega; Herrera – Melodie Johnson; Los Santos – Nadia Borrero; Panamá Norte – Stephanie Mosquera; Panamá Oeste – Ana Cristina Caballero; Santa Catalina – Marjorie Díaz

=== Special awards ===
Award	Contestant
Miss Resilient	Chiriquí – Yenifer Vega
Miss Congeniality	Costa Sur – Tanisha Ledezma
Beauty With Purpose	Ribera del Canal – Iveth Cortéz

== Judges ==
- Ana Lucia Tejeira – Reina Hispanoamericana Panamá 2021.
- Virginia Hernández – Miss World Panamá 2013 & Miss Earth Panamá 2016.
- Algis Gonzalez – Mister World Panamá 2019.

== Presentation Show ==
This Presentation event was held on 17 February 2022 at the Teatro Pacific in Panama City, is the night when the nineteen finalists were selected from Miss World Panamá 2022 are presented to the public and press in the Evening gown and cocktail dress categories.

== Challenge events ==
=== Top Model ===
Final Result	Contestant
Winner	Penonome – Diana Martínez
1st runner-up	Colón – Chelsea Bailey
2nd runner-up	Bocas del Toro – Kathleen Pérez Coffre

=== Sports & Fitness ===
Final Result	Contestant
Winner	Chiriquí – Yenifer Vega
1st runner-up	Penonome – Diana Martínez
2nd runner-up	Veraguas – Loana Alejandra Diaz

=== Talent ===
Final Result	Contestant
Winner	Colón – Chelsea Bailey
1st runner-up	Taboga – Anyelid Herazo
2nd runner-up	Penonome – Diana Martínez
Top 6	Panamá Oeste – Ana Cristina Caballero; Los Santos – Nadia Borrero; Costa Sur – Tanisha Ledezma

=== Beach Beauty ===
Final Result	Contestant
Winner	Bocas del Toro – Kathleen Pérez Coffre
1st runner-up	Penonome – Diana Martínez
2nd runner-up	Herrera – Melodie Johnson

=== Creativity ===
Final Result	Contestant
Winner	Los Santos – Nadia Borrero
1st runner-up	Taboga – Anyelid Herazo
2nd runner-up	Chiriquí Occidente – Patricia Mejía

== Official Contestants ==
These are the competitors who have been selected this year.

Represent	Contestant	Age	Hometown
Bocas del Toro	Kathleen Pérez Coffre	22	Changuinola
Chiriquí	Yenifer Vega	24	David
Chiriquí Occidente	Patricia Mejia Adames	24	David
Coclé	Eileen Paterson	24	Ciudad de Panamá
Colón	Chelsea Bailey	24	Ciudad de Panamá
Comarcas	Gelen Clara	24	Ciudad de Panamá
Costa Sur	Tanisha Ledezma	20	Ciudad de Panamá
Darién	Angie Paz	22	Ciudad de Panamá
Herrera	Melodie Johnson	17	Chitre
Los Santos	Nadia Borrero Garrido	19	Las Tablas
Panamá Centro	Emily Castro	22	Ciudad de Panamá
Panamá Este	Hazel Quinn	22	Ciudad de Panamá
Panamá Norte	Stephanie Mosquera	19	Ciudad de Panamá
Panamá Oeste	Ana Cristina Caballero	24	La Chorrera
Penonome	Diana Martínez Arosemena	24	Penonome
Ribera del Canal	Iveth Cortéz	23	Ciudad de Panamá
Santa Catalina	Marjorie Díaz	23	Ciudad de Panamá
Taboga	Anyelid Herazo	25	Ciudad de Panamá
Veraguas	Loana Alejandra Diaz	24	Santiago de Veraguas
