= Carlota Lozano =

Panamanian trainer and beauty pageant titleholder

- Born: Carlota Lozano; September 7, 1945 (age 81); Colón, Panama
- Height: 1.72 m (5 ft 8 in)
- Beauty pageant titleholder
- Title: Miss World Panamá 1967
- Hair color: Brown
- Eye color: Brown
- Major competitions: Miss Panamá 1967 (1st runner-up) (Miss World Panamá); Miss World 1967

Carlota Lozano (born September 7, 1945 in Colón) is a Panamanian trainer and beauty pageant titleholder.

== Miss Panama ==
She was elected Miss World Panama, the first Miss Panama for this pageant.

Awards and achievements
Preceded by New title	Miss World Panamá; 1967	Succeeded by Maria de Lourdes Rivera; 1971
