= Señorita Panamá 1993 =

- Date: September 1993
- Venue: Atlapa Convention Centre, Panama City, Panama
- Broadcaster: RPC Televisión
- Entrants: 15
- Winner: María Sofía Velásquez Jaimes-Freyre; Panama Central

Señorita Panamá 1993, the 11th Señorita Panamá pageant, was held in Teatro Anayansi Centro de Convenciones Atlapa, Panama City, Panama, September 1993, after weeks of events. The winner of the pageant was María Sofía Velásquez.

The pageant was broadcast live on RPC Televisión. About 15 contestants from all over Panamá competed for the prestigious crown. At the conclusion of the final night of competition, outgoing titleholder Giselle González crowned María Sofía Velásquez as the new Señorita Panamá.

Velásquez compete in the 43rd edition of the Miss Universe 1994 pageant, was held Plenary Hall of the Philippine International Convention Center, in Manila, Philippines on May 20, 1994.

== Final result ==
Final results	Contestant
Señorita Panamá-Miss Universe 1994	María Sofía Velásquez Jaimes-Freyre
Señorita Panamá-Miss Mundo 1993	Aracelys Cogley Prestán
Señorita Panamá-Miss Hispanidad 1994	Taisa Reina Jaén
1st Runner-Up	Ana Gabriela Delgado
2nd Runner-Up	Selma Deane Ayarza

== Contestants ==
These are the competitors who have been selected this year.

Represent	Contestant	Age	Height (m)	Hometown
1	Ana Elida Chow	18	1.68	Chitré
2	Ana Gabriela Delgado	21	1.70	Panama City
3	María Sofía Velázquez	23	1.70	Panama City
4	Michelle Obediente Talley	19	1.71	Panama City
5	Dunezkka Salamín	22	1.71	Panama City
6	Olga Conte	24	1.72	Panama City
7	Martha Vega	21	1.73	Chiriquí
8	Mirna Italina Blanco Espino	22	1.73	Panama City
9	Taisa Ayari Reina Jaén	24	1.74	Panama City
10	Ismenia Velásquez	21	1.75	Las Tablas
11	Ingunn Elena Méndez	19	1.76	Panama City
12	Yulissa Yumet	18	1.76	Chorrera
13	Ana María Jirón Soto-Bernal	20	1.78	Panama City
14	Zulema Sucre Menotti	24	1.79	Panama City
15	Aracelys Cogley Prestán	22	1.80	Colón
16	Selma Deane Ayarza	19	1.83	Colón

== Election schedule ==
- Thursday September Final night, coronation Señorita Panamá 1993

== Candidates Notes ==
María Sofía Velásquez born in Argentina.

== Historical significance ==
- Panama Central won Señorita Panamá.
