= Señorita Panamá 1990 =

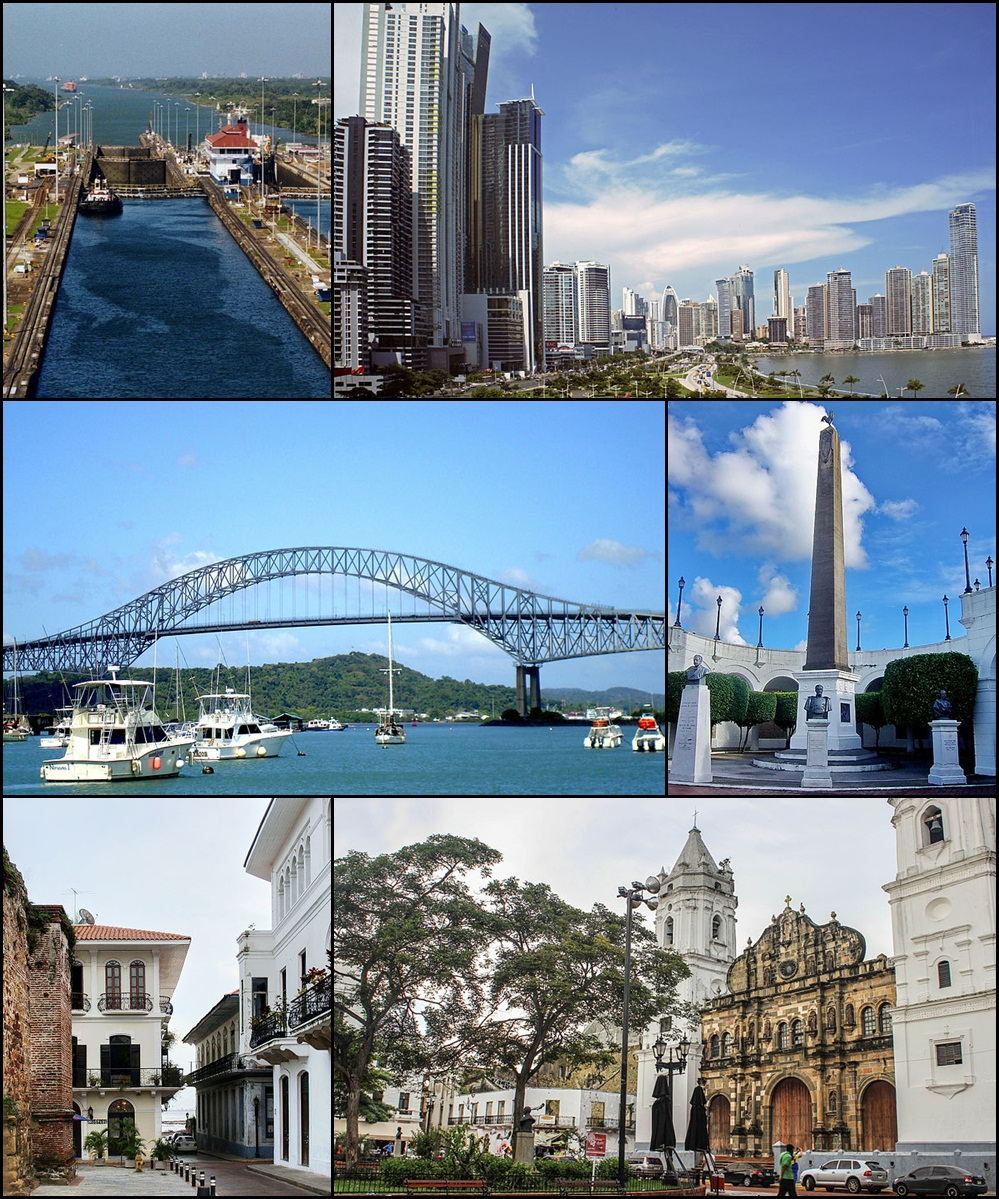
- Panama City host of Señorita Panamá 1990
- Date: August 1990
- Presenters: Luis Farías & Rosanna Uribe
- Venue: Atlapa Convention Centre, Panama City, Panama
- Broadcaster: RPC Televisión
- Entrants: 15
- Winner: Liz Michelle De León; Panamá Centro

Señorita Panamá 1990 the 8th Señorita Panamá pageant and 25th celebration of the Miss Panamá contest (1987 mark the 24th and last edition), also this year marked the debut of the Miss Universe License in the hands of RPC Channel 4, and unified the event which created the slogan "Three Crowns for Three Beauties". Señorita Panamá used to send the winner to Miss World, but starting in 1990 the winners would go to Miss Universe, Miss World and Miss Hispanidad respectively. It was also the first edition held after the Panama Invasion, when the economic and political situation in the country had a positive shift.

The political turmoil in Panama caused an absence of three years in the Miss Universe pageant from 1988 to 1990. No Panamanian queens participated during these years.

The event was held in Teatro Anayansi Centro de Convenciones Atlapa, Panama City, Panama, in August, 1990, after weeks of events. The winner of the pageant was Liz De León.

The pageant was broadcast on RPC Televisión Channel 4. About 15 contestants from all over Panamá competed for the prestigious crown. At the conclusion of the final night of competition, outgoing titleholder Gabriela Deleuze (Miss Panamá 1987) of Los Santos crowned Liz De León of Panamá Centro as the new Señorita Panamá for Miss Universe.

On the same night was celebrated the election of the "Señorita Panamá World", was announced the winner of the Señorita Panamá Mundo title. Señorita Panamá 1989 Gloria Stella Quintana of Panamá Centro crowned Madelaine Leignadier Dawson of Panamá Centro as the new Señorita Panamá World. Also was selected as the representative for the Miss Hispanidad pageant Ana Lucía Herrera of Panamá Centro was crowned as Señorita Panamá-Miss Hispanidad 1990.

De León Paz competed in the 40th Miss Universe pageant, which was held on May 17, 1991 at the Aladdin Theatre for the Performing Arts in Las Vegas, Nevada, United States.

In other hands Leignadier Dawson competed in Miss World 1990, the 40th edition of the Miss World pageant, was held on 8 November 1990 at the London Palladium in London, United Kingdom. Herrera competed in Miss Hispanidad International 1990 pageant, the 3rd edition of Miss Hispanidad Pageant and was held on August 25, 1009 in Miami Beach, United States.

== Final result ==
Final results	Contestant
Señorita Panamá 1990	Panama City - Liz De León
Señorita Panamá World	Panama City - Madelaine Leignadier Dawson
Señorita Panamá Miss Hispanidad	Panama City - Ana Lucía Herrera
1st runner-up	Panama City - Lourdes Rivera Maruri
2nd runner-up	Panama City - Diana Stumvall

== Contestants ==
These are the competitors who have been selected this year.

#	Represent	Contestant	Age	Height	Hometown
1	Panama City	Liz De León	-	mts	Panama City
2	Panama City	Madelaine Leignadier Dawson	20	mts	Panama City
3	Panama City	Ana Lucía Herrera	-	mts	
4	Panama City	Lourdes Rivera Maruri	-	mts	
5	Panama City	Diana Stumvall	-	mts	
6	Panama City	Cornelia Macdonald-	-1.85mts		
7			-	mts	
8			-	mts	
9			-	mts	
10			-	mts	
11			-	mts	
12			-	-mts	
13			-	-mts	
14			-	-mts	
15			-	-mts	
