= Señorita Panamá =

Beauty pageant in Panama

Señorita Panamá Organization
- Formation: 1952; 74 years ago (as Miss Panama)
- Headquarters: Panama City
- Location: Panama
- Official language: Spanish
- President: Carolina Chiari (Miss Panama, 1976-1987), RPC TV/MEDCOM (Senorita Panama, 1982-2010), Marisela Moreno (2011- 2015), César Anel Rodríguez (Senorita Panama, 2016 - )
- Affiliations: Miss Universe; Miss World; Miss International; Miss Earth; Miss Supranational; Miss Grand International; Miss Cosmo
- Website: www.senoritapanama.com

The Señorita Panamá is a national beauty pageant in Panama. As of the 2024 edition, Señorita Panamá winners represent Panamá in Miss Universe. The Miss Panama brand started in 1952, when the Panamanian Institute of Tourism received an invitation from Miss Universe to send a representative. In 1975, the Señorita Panamá name was used for the first time, reverting to Miss Panama in 1976. In 1982, Señorita Panamá was created by RPC Channel 4 as an alternative to send its winners to the Miss World contest in London. These pageants, along with smaller pageants such as Miss International Panamá and Miss World Panamá celebrated to select delegates for international representations.

== History ==
The National Beauty Pageant was known as "Miss Panama" until 1975, when organizers decided to use "Señorita Panamá", a brand that lasted only one year. Then, in 1982, "Señorita Panamá" was created as a rival of "Miss Panama" which sent its winners to Miss Universe. The "Miss Panama" competition was then discontinued in 1988.

After 28 years, the Señorita Panamá pageant, organized by Medcom Corporation, was discontinued. A new organization took over in 2011 rebranding the competition as "Miss Panama", a name that had not been in use since 1987. (not to be confused with Señorita Panamá or Bellezas Panamá).

After five years of the Miss Panama pageant under the direction of Marisela Moreno, Medcom Corporation lost the franchise of Miss Universe in 2016, and the opportunity to select the candidate for this contest. César Anel Rodríguez and Justine Pasek acquire the rights of the title Señorita Panamá pageant and select the candidate who represent the country in Miss Universe, Miss International, Miss Supranational and Miss Grand International. Justine Pasek left the organization in December 2017 to focus on family. In 2022 Rodriguez lost the franchise of Miss Universe and re-acquired in 2024.

From 2022 to 2023 a new organization took over the organization rebranding the competition as "Miss Panama" again selecting the candidate to represent Panama en Miss Universe under the direction of Ricardo Canto.

== International participation ==
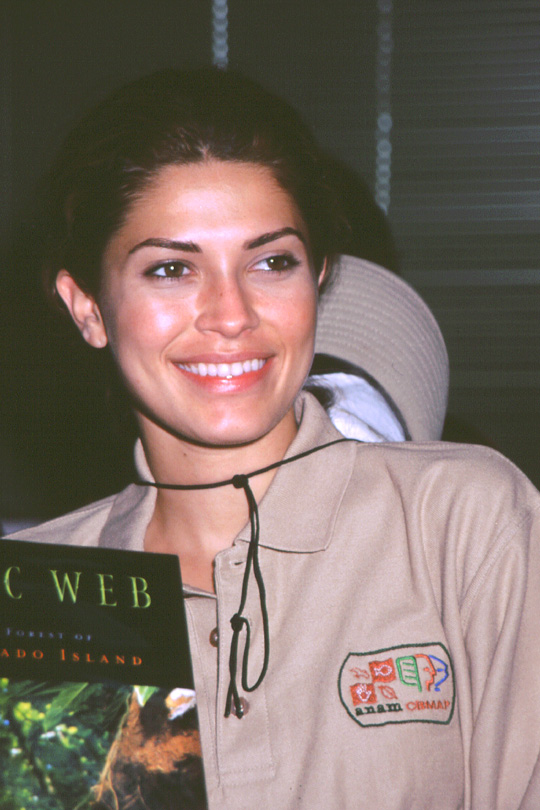
Justine Pasek, Miss Universe 2002

Panama has been represented in various international pageants, including the biggest names, such as Miss Universe, Miss World and Miss International.

The country has won two major international titles: Miss International 1998 and Miss Universe 2002. Lía Victoria Borrero González won the Miss International 1998 while Justine Pasek, who represented Panama in Miss Universe 2002, won by default when she replaced the dethroned winner Oxana Fedorova of Russia.

Panama has not won the Miss World title. The country has four semifinalists and two finalist in Miss World with Lorelay de la Ossa in Miss World 1979, Marissa Burgos Canalias in Miss World 1983, María Lorena Orillac Giraldo in Miss World 1986, Nadege Herrera in Miss World 2009, Maricely González in Miss World 2012 and Solaris Barba in Miss World 2018 also winning for first time for Panama the title of Miss World America. The country's highest placement in Miss Earth was achieved by Stefanie de Roux who finished as top eight finalist in the Miss Earth 2006

From 2011 to 2015, the Miss Universe Panamá and Miss World Panamá were selected by Miss Panamá while Miss Earth Panamá and Miss Internacional Panamá were selected in the Bellezas Panamá pageant organized by Tania Hyman's Models and Talents. However, in 2012, the four titles (Miss Panama Universe, Miss Panama World, Miss Panama Earth, and Miss Panama International) were selected by one organization called, ORGANIZACIÓN MISS PANAMA. This year Miss Panama had two presidents Marisela Moreno and Tania Hyman.

Panama was represented in the international pageants of 2026/27 by the following representatives:

- Miss Universe: Gabriela Lineth González del Valle
- Miss World: Madeline Elena Miller Vergara
- Miss International: Carmen Johany Quintero Pittí
- Miss Earth: Nicole Castillero González

== States, capital and regions ==
Although women from all over the country have been competing in the pageant for decades, 2011 was the first time in history that the contestants represented Panama's provinces and regions. The Miss Panama competition distributed its 20 finalists in the following regions:

=== Official states (10) ===
- Bocas del Toro
- Chiriquí
- Coclé
- Colón
- Darién
- Herrera
- Los Santos
- Panamá Centro
- Veraguas
- Panamá Oeste

=== Official regions (7) ===
- Panamá Este (east side (Panama state))
- Panamá Norte (north side (Panama state))
- Chiriquí Occidente (occidental side (Chiriquí state))
- Comarcas (indigenous region of Panama)
- Portobelo (historical district of the Colón state)
- Atlantic Coast
- Pacific Coast
- Canal Coast

=== Official Island (7) ===
- Barro Colorado
- Coiba
- Contadora
- Flamenco
- Isla del Rey
- Isla San José
- Taboga

==== Regional rankings ====
Titles	State	Years
29	Panamá Centro	1954; 1971; 1973; 1974; 1975; 1976; 1978; 1979; 1981; 1982; 1983; 1985; 1984; 1990; 1991; 1993; 1994; 1995; 1998; 2000; 2001; 2002; 2003; 2005; 2006; 2008; 2012; 2016; 2021
9	Los Santos	1953; 1966; 1977; 1987; 1996; 2004; 2009; 2015; 2023
5	Veraguas	1970; 1986; 1992; 2010; 2013
3	Chiriquí	1999; 2024 (Note: Originally 2nd runner-Up and assumed the Miss Panamá title when the original winner was dethroned); 2026
3	Herrera	1967; 2011; 2022
3	Colón	1965; 1980; 1997
2	Darién	2007; 2014
2	Coclé	1952; 1964
1	Riviera del Canal	2024
1	Panamá Este	2020
1	Flamenco	2019
1	Comarcas	2018
1	Contadora	2017
0	Bocas del Toro	
0	Panamá Oeste	
0	Chiriquí Occidente	

The regional ranking is established according to the state of origin or representation of the miss (Miss Universe) and the year they won the title.

== Titleholders ==
The following women have been crowned Miss Panamá.

Year	Miss Panama	State	Venue
1952	Elzibir Gisela Malek	Coclé	Hotel El Panamá
1953	Emita Arosemena†	Los Santos	
1954-1963	Liliana Torre	Panamá Centro	
1964	Maritza Montilla	Coclé	
1965	Sonia Inés Ríos†	Colón	
1966	Dionisia Broce	Los Santos	
1967-1969	Mirna Norma Castillero	Herrera	
1970	Berta López Herrera	Veraguas	
1971-1972	Gladys Isaza	Panamá Centro	
1973	Janine Lizuaín	Panamá Centro	
1974	Jazmín Nereida Panay	Panamá Centro	
1975	Anina Horta Torrijos	Panamá Centro	
1976	Carolina Maria Chiari	Panamá Centro	
1977	Marina Valenciano	Los Santos	
1978	Diana Leticia Conte Vergara	Panamá Centro	
1979	Yahel Cecile Dolande	Panamá Centro	
1980	Gloria Karamañites	Colón	
1981	Ana María Henríquez Valdés	Panamá Centro	
1982	Isora de Lourdes Moreno López	Panamá Centro	
1983	Elizabeth Bylan Bennett	Panamá Centro	
1984	Cilinia Prada Acosta	Panamá Centro	
1985	Janett Vásquez Sanjur	Panamá Centro	Teatro Nacional de Panamá, Ciudad de Panamá.
1986	Gilda García	Veraguas	
1987-1989	Gabriela Deleuze	Los Santos	
1990	Liz De León	Panamá Centro	
1991	Ana Orillac	Panamá Centro	
1992	Giselle González	Veraguas	
1993	María Sofía Velásquez	Panamá Centro	Teatro Anayansi Centro de Convenciones Atlapa, Ciudad de Panamá.
1994	Michele Sage	Panamá Centro	Teatro Anayansi Centro de Convenciones Atlapa, Ciudad de Panamá.
1995	Reyna Royo	Panamá Centro	Teatro Anayansi Centro de Convenciones Atlapa, Ciudad de Panamá.
1996	Lía Borrero	Los Santos	Teatro Anayansi Centro de Convenciones Atlapa, Ciudad de Panamá.
1997	Tanisha Drummond	Colón	Teatro Anayansi Centro de Convenciones Atlapa, Ciudad de Panamá.
1998	Yamani Saied	Panamá Centro	Teatro Anayansi Centro de Convenciones Atlapa, Ciudad de Panamá.
1999	Analía Núñez	Chiriquí	Teatro Anayansi Centro de Convenciones Atlapa, Ciudad de Panamá.
2000	Ivette Cordovez	Panamá Centro	Teatro Anayansi Centro de Convenciones Atlapa, Ciudad de Panamá.
2001	Justine Pasek	Panamá Centro	Gran Salón Hotel Continental, Ciudad de Panamá.
2002	Stefanie de Roux	Panamá Centro	Centro de Convenciones Vasco Núñez, Ciudad de Panamá.
2003	Jessica Rodríguez	Panamá Centro	Figali Convention Center, Ciudad de Panamá.
2004	Rosa María Hernández	Los Santos	Teatro Nacional de Panamá, Ciudad de Panamá.
2005	María Alessandra Mezquita	Panamá Centro	Centro de Convenciones Vasco Núñez del Hotel El Panamá, Ciudad de Panamá.
2006	Giselle Bissot	Panamá Centro	Gran Salón del Hotel & Casino Venetto, Ciudad de Panamá.
2007	Sorangel Matos	Darien	Gran Salón del Hotel & Casino Venetto, Ciudad de Panamá.
2008	Carolina Dementiev	Panamá Centro	Studio "B" de Canal 13 Telemetro, Ciudad de Panamá.
2009	Diana Broce	Los Santos	Tihany Spectacular, Ciudad de Panamá.
2010	Anyolí Ábrego	Veraguas	Sheraton Hotel, Ciudad de Panamá.
2011	Sheldry Sáez	Herrera	Teatro Anayansi Centro de Convenciones Atlapa, Ciudad de Panamá.
2012	Stephanie Vander Werf	Panamá Centro	Riu Plaza Panamá Hotel, Ciudad de Panamá.
2013	Carolina Brid	Veraguas	Teatro Anayansi Centro de Convenciones Atlapa, Ciudad de Panamá.
2014	Yomatzy Hazlewood	Darien	Riu Plaza Panamá Hotel, Ciudad de Panamá.
2015	Gladys Brandao	Los Santos	Hard Rock Hotel & Cafe Megapolis Panama, Ciudad de Panamá
2016	Keity Drennan	Panamá Centro	Trump Ocean Club International Hotel and Tower, Ciudad de Panamá
2017	Laura Sofía de Sanctis Natera	Contadora	Teatro Anayansi Centro de Convenciones Atlapa, Ciudad de Panamá.
2018	Rosa Montezuma	Comarcas	Roberto Durán Arena, Ciudad de Panamá.
2019	Mehr Eliezer	Flamenco	Roberto Durán Arena, Ciudad de Panamá.
2020	Carmen Jaramillo	Panamá Este	Roberto Durán Arena, Ciudad de Panamá.
2021	Brenda Smith	Panamá Centro	Hotel Whyndham Convention Center, Ciudad de Panamá.
2022	Solaris Barba	Herrera	Teatro Gladys Vidal, Ciudad de Panamá.
2023	Natasha Vargas	Los Santos	Teatro Anayansi Centro de Convenciones Atlapa, Ciudad de Panamá.
2024	Italy Mora	Riviera del Canal	Figali Convention Center, Ciudad de Panamá.
2025	Mirna Alejandra Caballini Bouche	Chiriquí	Figali Convention Center, Ciudad de Panamá.
2026	Gabriela Lineth González del Valle	Chiriquí	Roberto Durán Arena, Ciudad de Panamá.

=== Winners gallery ===
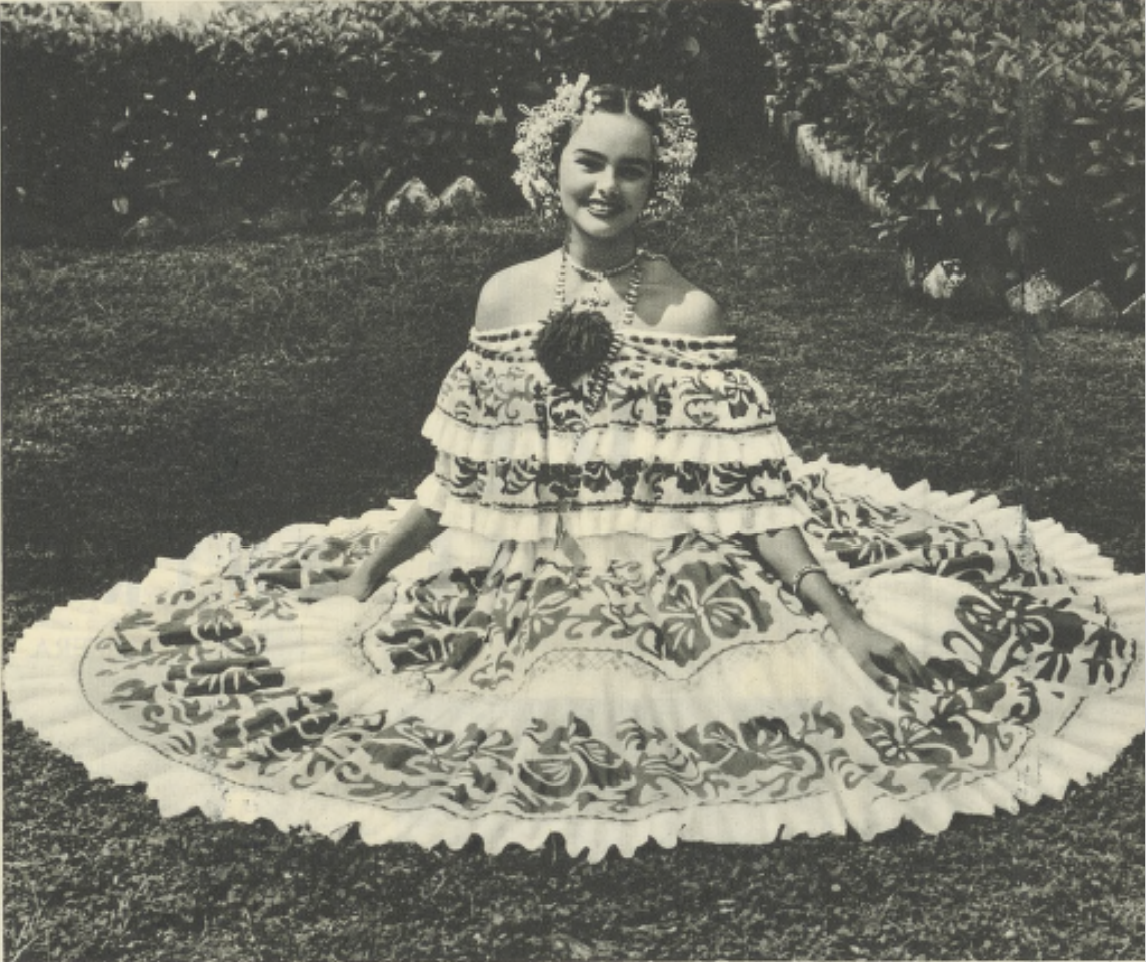
Miss Panamá 1953
Emita Arosemena

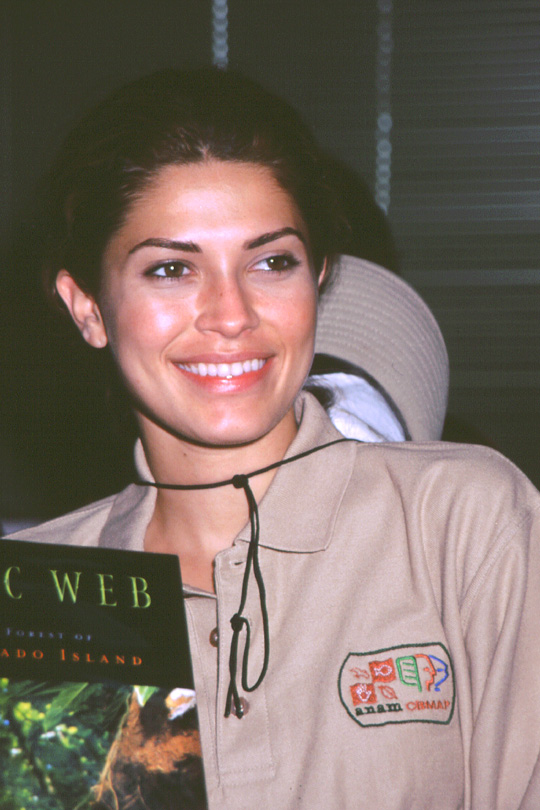
Señorita Panamá 2001 and Miss Universe 2002
Justine Pasek

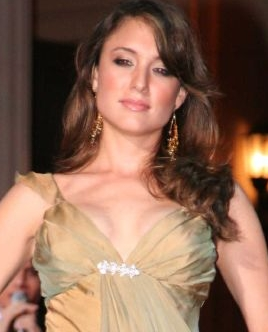
Señorita Panamá 2002
Stefanie de Roux

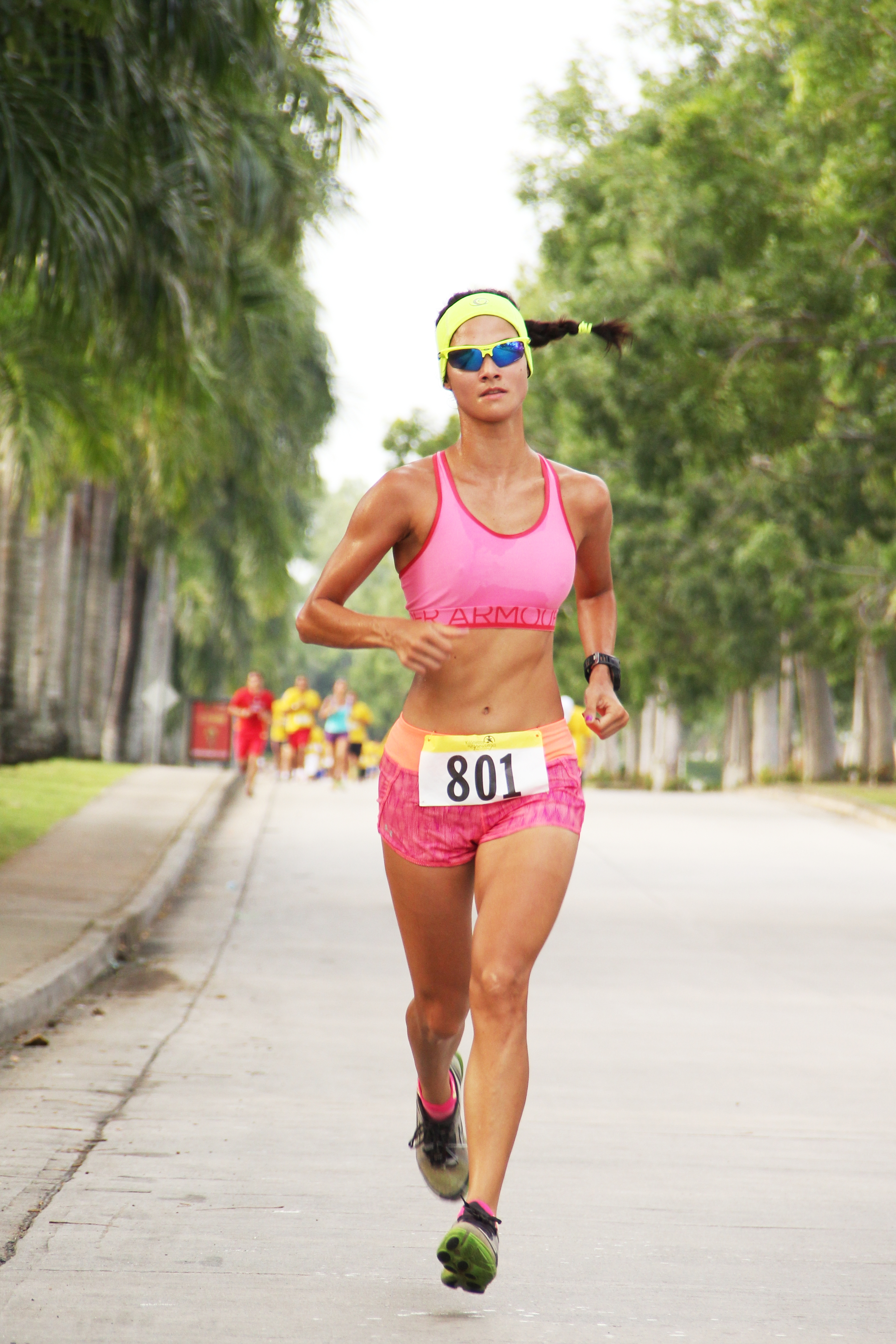
Señorita Panamá 2008
Carolina Dementiev

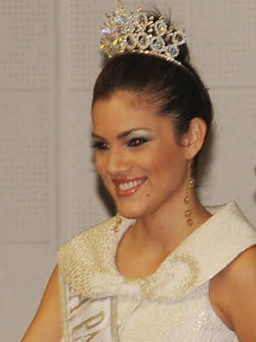
Señorita Panamá 2010
Anyolí Ábrego

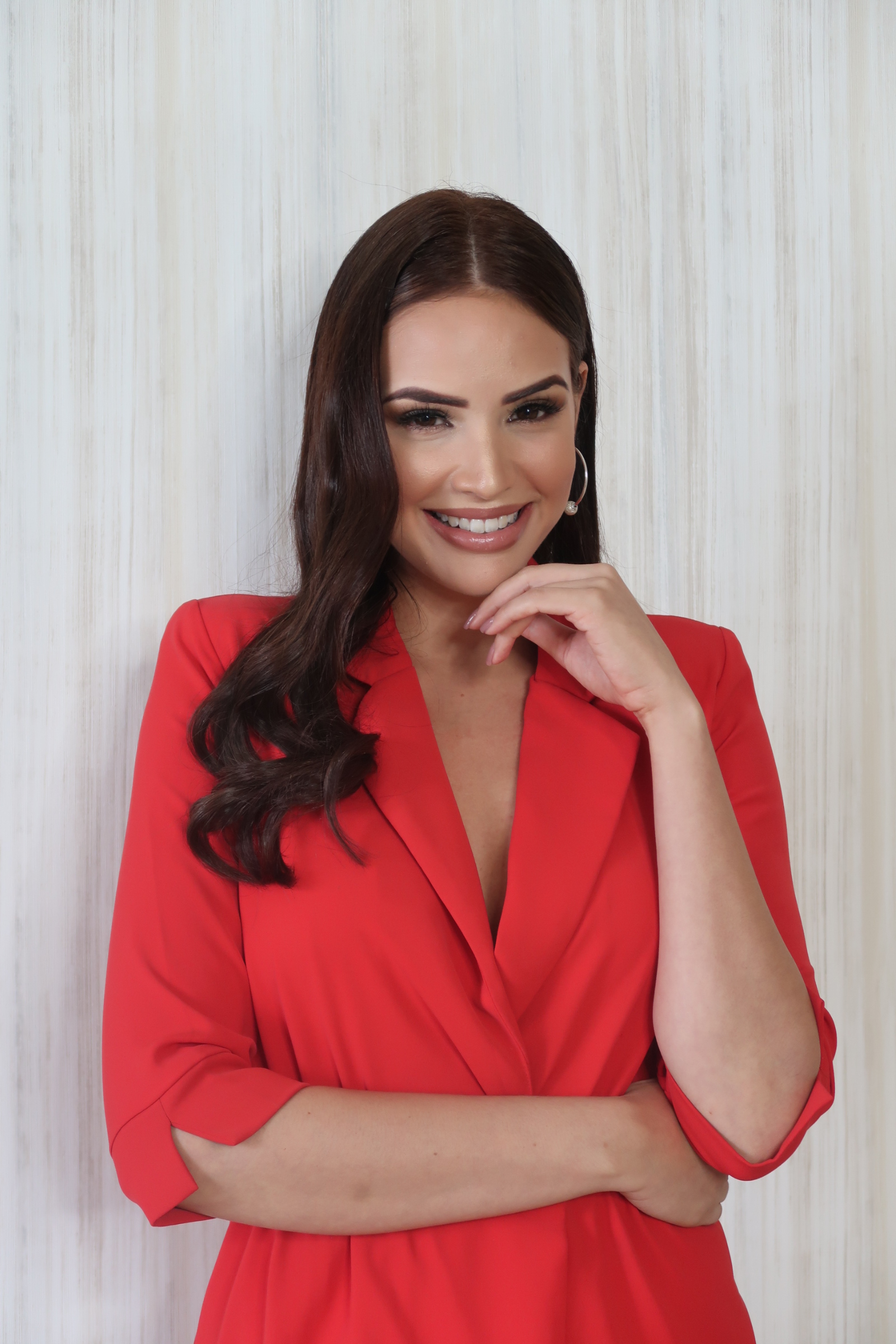
Miss Panamá 2011
Sheldry Sáez

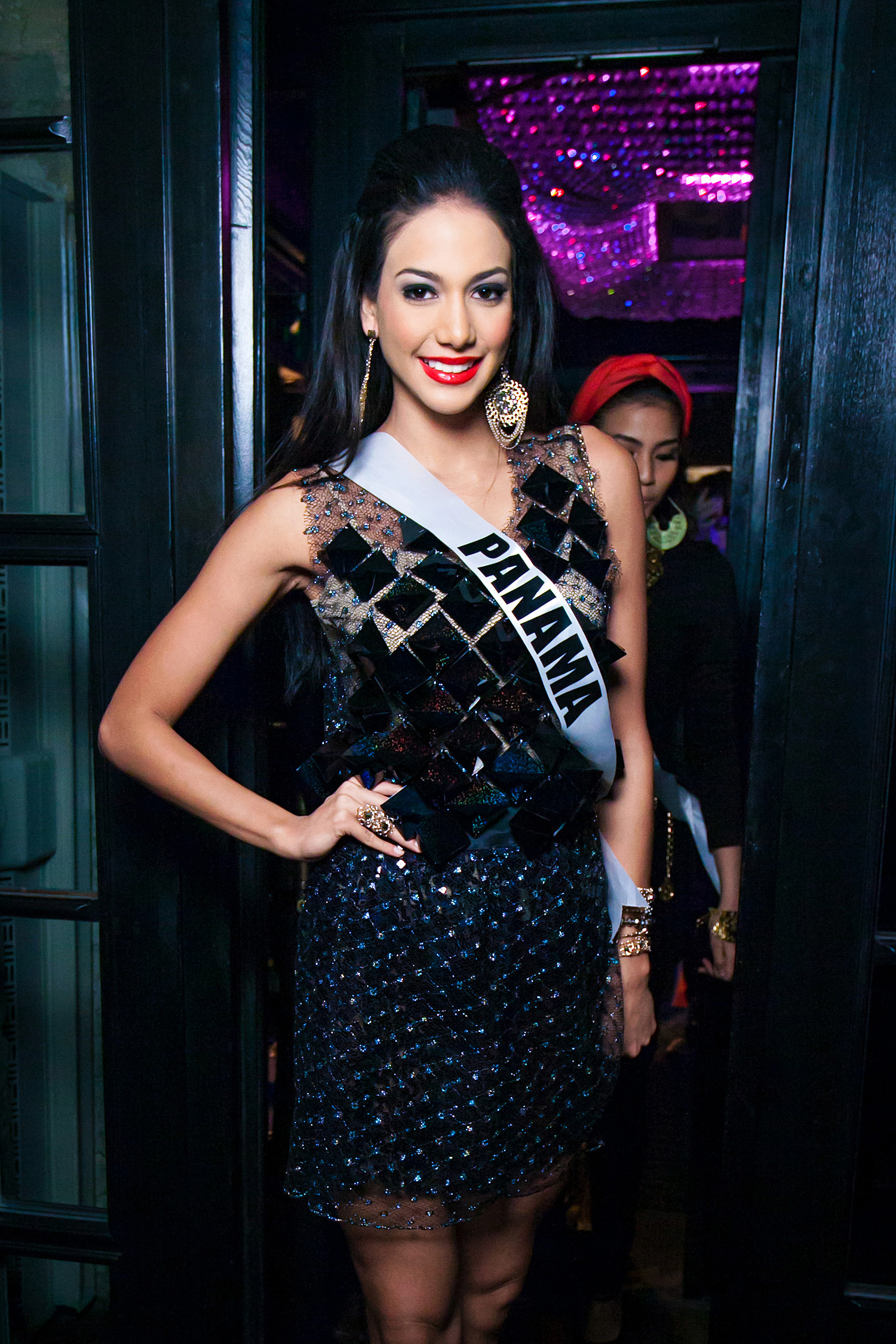
Miss Panamá 2013
Carolina Brid

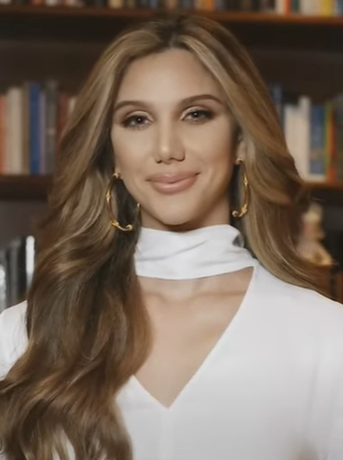
Señorita Panamá 2017
Laura de Sanctis

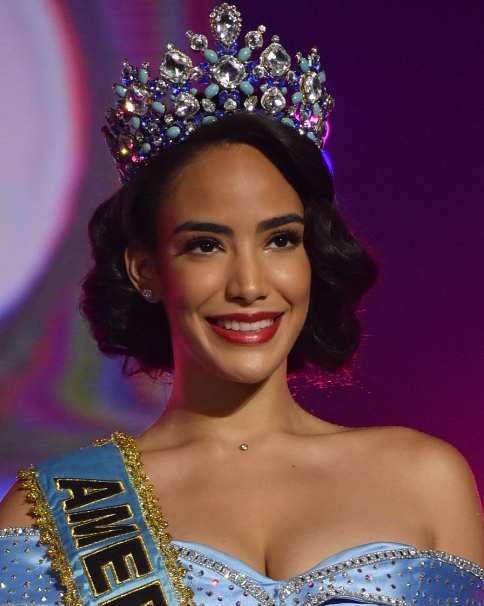
Miss Panamá 2022
Solaris Barba

== Miss Panamá ==
=== History ===
The Miss Panama pageant, was born in 1952 when an invitation was received by tourism authorities to select a contestant for the purpose of sending advertising a Panamanian representative to Miss Universe contest in California, United States, which had been created that same year by the company Pacific Mills to promote its brand of bikinis "Catalina".

In 1977, Carolina Chiari acquired the rights of the pageant and created a televised contest. The winner went to Miss Universe and the 1st runner-up went to Miss World, until 1980. During the 1980s, the pageant was broadcast and promoted by Channel 2, which was the official Government network, giving place to endless rumors about affairs between the beauty queens and authority figures. The last edition of Miss Panama took place 1987 when the country entered the political and financial crisis which ended with the arrest of General Manuel Antonio Noriega.

=== Titleholders ===
Color key

- Declared as Winner
- Ended as runner-up
- Ended as one of the finalists or semifinalists

Year	Miss Panamá	Official Title	International	Placement	Notes
1952	Elzibir Gisela Malek	Miss Panamá	Miss Universe	Unplaced	
1953	Emita Arosemena†	Miss Panamá	Miss Universe	Top 16	
1954	Liliana Torre	Miss Panamá	Miss Universe	Top 16	
1955–1963	No Contest	Miss Panamá	Miss Universe		Cancelled due to church protests
1964	Maritza Montilla	Miss Panamá	Miss Universe	Unplaced	
1965	Sonia Inés Ríos†	Miss Panamá	Miss Universe	Unplaced	
1966	Dionisia Broce	Miss Panamá	Miss Universe	Unplaced	
1967	Mirna Norma Castillero	Miss Panamá	Miss Universe	Unplaced	
1967	Carlota Lozano	1st Runner-Up	Miss World	Unplaced	
1968–1969	No Contest	Miss Panamá	Miss Universe	Unplaced	
1970	Berta López Herrera	Miss Panamá	Miss Universe	Unplaced	
1971	Gladys Isaza	Miss Panamá	Miss Universe	Unplaced	
1971	Maria de Lourdes Rivera	1st Runner-Up	Miss World	Unplaced	
1972	No Contest	Miss Panamá	Miss Universe		
1973	Janine Lizuaín	Miss Panamá	Miss Universe	Unplaced	
1974	Jazmín Nereida Panay	Miss Panamá	Miss Universe	Top 12	
1975	Anina Horta Torrijos	Miss Panamá	Miss Universe	Unplaced	
1976	Carolina Maria Chiari	Miss Panamá	Miss Universe	Unplaced	
1977	Marina Valenciano	Miss Panamá	Miss Universe	Unplaced	
1977	Anabelle Vallarino	1st Runner-Up	Miss World	Unplaced	
1978	Diana Leticia Conte	Miss Panamá	Miss Universe	Unplaced	
1979	Yahel Dolande	Miss Panamá	Miss Universe	Unplaced	
1979	Lorelay de la Ossa	1st Runner-Up	Miss World	Top 15	
1980	Gloria Karamañites	Miss Panamá	Miss Universe	Top 10	
1980	Aurea Horta Torrijos	1st Runner-Up	Miss World	Unplaced	
1981	Ana María Henríquez	Miss Panamá	Miss Universe	Unplaced	
1982	Isora Moreno	Miss Panamá	Miss Universe	Unplaced	
1983	Elizabeth Bylan Bennett	Miss Panamá	Miss Universe	Unplaced	
1984	Cilinia Prada Acosta	Miss Panamá	Miss Universe	Unplaced	Won Miss Asia Pacific 1987
1985	Janett Vásquez	Miss Panamá	Miss Universe	Unplaced	
1986	Gilda García	Miss Panamá	Miss Universe	Unplaced	Best National Costume
1987	Gabriela Deleuze	Miss Panamá	Miss Universe	Unplaced	

== Miss Panamá (2011–2015) ==
=== History ===
In 2010 the corporation MEDCOM rights organization gave the Señorita Panamá contest the former Señorita Panama- Mundo (1995) Marisela Moreno who would be responsible for electing the representative of Panama at the Miss Universe and Miss World contest. Moreno acquired the rights of the former Miss Panama contest called again, with a choice format similar to that possessed the previous national competition.

Miss Panama was held between April and mid May after three months of preliminary events such as the Council or Misses runaway, in which the candidates are presented to the press and bands receive prizes and the sponsors . As a subsidiary Medcom group of companies, is responsible Telemetro live broadcast of the show, which usually includes presentations by renowned international artists. In 2011 and 2013 the event has taken place in the Teatro Anayansi Atlapa Convention Center.

The candidates are selected from groups of girls, either because they competed through regional casting or because they were chosen directly by the Organization Miss Panama, who decide the final number depending on the talent available this year. Usually there is one candidate for each of the 9 states of Panama, but the number may reach 12 due to the custom of including major geographic regions such as Western Chiriquí, Panama East - West and Central Panama. However, this does not mean that the contestants are in these regions or states, and that the final decision on who is participating in the competition authority of the president of the organization. Typically, the number of candidates ranges from 12.

In 2012, Miss Panamá acquired the national franchises to elect representatives to Miss Earth and Miss International thus Miss Panamá started to crown four winners in the following order: Miss Panamá Universe, Miss Panama World, Miss Panama Earth, and Miss Panama International to represent the country to the four major international beauty contests.

For 2013 Miss Panamá acquired the national franchise to elect representative to Miss Intercontinental Pageant, started to crown three winners in the following order: Miss Panamá Universe, Miss Panama World, Miss Panama Intercontinental.

The election of the new representatives of Panama takes place from 2011 to 2015.

=== Titleholders ===
Color key

- Declared as Winner
- Ended as runner-up
- Ended as one of the finalists or semifinalists

Year	Miss Panamá	Official Title	Represent	International	Placement	Notes
2011	Sheldry Sáez	Miss Panamá Universe	Herrera	Miss Universe 2011	Top 10	Best National Costume
2011	Irene Núñez	Miss Panamá World	Veraguas	Miss World 2011	Unplaced	Top 24 at Miss World Sport Top 36 at Miss World Beach Beauty
2012	Stephanie Vander Werf	Miss Panamá Universe	Panamá Centro	Miss Universe 2012	Unplaced	8th place en National Costume
2012	Maricely González	Miss Panamá World	Bocas del Toro	Miss World 2012	Top 30	Top 5 at Miss World Talent
2012	Ana Ibáñez	Miss Earth Panamá	Coclé	Miss Earth 2012	Unplaced	
2012	Karen Jordán	Miss International Panamá	Chiriquí	Miss International 2012	Unplaced	
2013	Carolina Brid	Miss Panamá Universe	Veraguas	Miss Universe 2013	Unplaced	
2013	Virginia Hernández	Miss World Panamá	Panamá Centro	Miss World 2013	Unplaced	Top 12 at Miss World Talent Top 20 at Miss World Sport
2013	Sara Bello	Miss Intercontinental Panamá	Los Santos	Miss Intercontinental 2013	Top 15	Best National Costume
2013	Maria Gabrielle Sealy	Miss Continentes Unidos Panama	Panamá Centro	Miss United Continent 2013	4th Runner up	
2014	Yomatzy Hazlewood	Miss Panamá Universe	Darien	Miss Universe 2014	Unplaced	
2014	Raiza Erlenbaugh	Miss World Panamá	Panamá Centro	Miss World 2014	Dethroned	Erlenbaugh was detroned on November 12, and replaced by Nicole Pinto as Miss World Panama in Miss World 2014
2014	Stephanie Paulette González Castillo	Miss Intercontinental Panamá	Los Santos	Miss Intercontinental 2014	Unplaced	Best National Costume
2014	Nicole Pinto	Miss América Latina del Mundo Panamá	Panamá Oeste	Miss Latin America 2014	Miss Latin America 2014	Represented Panama in Miss World 2014.
2015	Gladys Brandao	Miss Panamá Universe	Los Santos	Miss Universe 2015	Unplaced	2nd runner-up Best National Costume
2015	Diana Doris Jaén Ortega	Miss Panamá World	Coclé	Miss World 2015	Unplaced	
2015	Catherine Argelia Agrazal Pinilla	Miss Panamá Reina Internacional del Café	Veraguas	Reinado Internacional del Café 2016	Unplaced	

== Miss Panamá (2022 - 2023) ==
=== History ===
In 2022 the Señorita Panamá organization lost the rights of Miss Universe. Ricardo Canto who would be responsible for electing the representative of Panama at the Miss Universe. Canto acquired the rights of the former Miss Panama contest called one again, and also merging with the organization Miss Universe Panama with a choice format similar to that possessed the previous national competition.

In 2023 the organization is renamed Miss Panama once again.

=== Titleholders ===
Color key

- Declared as Winner
- Ended as runner-up
- Ended as one of the finalists or semifinalists

Year	Miss Panamá	Official Title	Represent	International	Placement	Notes
2023	Natasha Vargas	Miss Panamá Universe	Los Santos	Miss Universe 2023		

== Señorita Panamá ==
=== History ===
In 1982, a new pageant was born, created by Channel 4 RPC. It was named Señorita Panamá and its winners were sent to Miss World until 1989. In 1990, the pageant acquired the franchise for Miss Universe and the contest crowned three winners: one for Miss Universe, another for Miss World and a third one that attended Miss Hispanidad from 1990 to 1995, Nuestra Belleza Internacional from 1996 to 1997 and Miss Asia Pacific from 1998 to 2000. The third title was eliminated in 2001.

In 2003, the contest was moved to November, therefore there was no time to elect a delegate for Miss World. Stefanie de Roux and Yanela de Sedas were offered the chance, but both declined due to their studies. That year, the Panama franchise was given to Bolivian-based Promociones Gloria, which conducted a small casting to select a delegate for Miss World. The winner was Ivy Ruth Ortega Coronas. Melissa Piedrahita represented Panama in Miss World 2004.

In 2008, the contest changed its name to Realmente Bella and was shown in a reality show format and is televise for Telemetro Channel. 10 girls lived together in a hotel and each week one of them was dismissed. The winner competed at the Miss Universe 2008 contest in Vietnam.

In 2009, the reality show took place again. For the first time in the Miss Panama contest, open casting calls were held, which resulted in complete failure as only about 17 girls in four cities showed up. 10 finalists were chosen to compete. Finally in 2010 the pageant take the old format with a final night of coronation as in past years.

=== Titleholders ===
Color key

- Declared as Winner
- Ended as runner-up
- Ended as one of the finalists or semifinalists

Year	Señorita Panamá	Official Title	International	Placement	Notes
1982	Lorena Moreno	Señorita Panamá	Miss World	Unplaced	
1983	Marissa Burgos Canalías	Señorita Panamá	Miss World	4th Runner-Up	
1984	Ana Luisa Sedda Reyes	Señorita Panamá	Miss World	Unplaced	Miss Congeniality
1985	Diana Esther Alfaro Arosemena	Señorita Panamá	Miss World	Unplaced	
1986	María Lorena Orillac Giraldo	Señorita Panamá	Miss World	Top 10	
1987	María Cordelia Denis Urriola	Señorita Panamá	Miss World	Unplaced	
1989	Gloria Stella Quintana	Señorita Panamá	Miss World	Unplaced / Miss Congeniality	Miss Hispanidad 1989
1990	Liz De León	Señorita Panamá	Miss Universe	Unplaced	
1990	Madelaine Leignadier Dawson	1st Runner-up	Miss World	Unplaced	
1990	Ana Lucía Herrera	2nd Runner-up	Miss Hispanidad 1990	Unplaced	
1991	Ana Orillac	Señorita Panamá	Miss Universe	Unplaced	
1991	Malena Estela Betancourt Guillén	1st Runner-up	Miss World	Unplaced	
1991	Janell Cosca Tovío†	2nd Runner-up	Miss Hispanidad 1991	Unplaced	
1992	Giselle González	Señorita Panamá	Miss Universe	Unplaced	
1992	Michelle Marie Harrington Hasbún	1st Runner-up	Miss World	Unplaced	
1992	Elsa Jiménez Jiménez	2nd Runner-up	Miss Hispanidad	Miss Hispanidad 1993	
1993	María Sofía Velásquez	Señorita Panamá	Miss Universe	Unplaced	
1993	Aracelys Cogley Prestán	1st Runner-up	Miss World	Unplaced	
1993	Taisa Reina Jaén	2nd Runner-up	Miss Hispanidad 1994	Unplaced	
1994	Michele Sage	Señorita Panamá	Miss Universe 1995	Unplaced	
1994	Carmen Lucia Ogando Giono	1st Runner-up	Miss World 1994	Unplaced	
1994	Marilyn González	2nd Runner-up	Miss Hispanidad 1995	Unplaced	
1995	Reyna Royo	Señorita Panamá	Miss Universe 1996	Unplaced	
1995	Marisela Moreno	1st Runner-up	Miss World 1995	Unplaced	
1995	Patricia de León	2nd Runner-up	did not compete		Was sent to Miss Asia Pacific 1997
1996	Lía Victoria Borrero González	Señorita Panamá	Miss Universe 1997	Top 6	Miss International 1998
1996	Norma Elida Pérez Rodriguez	1st Runner-up	Miss World 1996	Unplaced	
1996	Amelie González Assereto	2nd Runner-up	Nuestra Belleza Internacional 1996	Unplaced	
1997	Tanisha Drummond	Señorita Panamá	Miss Universe 1998	Unplaced	Miss Caraïbes Hibiscus 1998
1997	Patricia Aurora Bremner Hernández	1st Runner-up	Miss World 1997	Unplaced	
1997	Iris Avila Moreno	2nd Runner-up	Nuestra Belleza Internacional 1997	Unplaced	
1998	Yamani Saied	Señorita Panamá	Miss Universe 1999	Unplaced	
1998	Lorena del Carmen Zagía Miró	1st Runner-up	Miss World 1998	Unplaced	
1998	Abimelec Rodríguez	2nd Runner-up	Miss Asia Pacific	Unplaced	
1999	Analía Núñez	Señorita Panamá	Miss Universe 2000	Unplaced	13th overall in the preliminaries
1999	Jessenia Casanova Reyes	1st Runner-up	Miss World 1999	Unplaced	
1999	Marianela Salazar	2nd Runner-up	Miss Asia Pacific	1st Runner-Up	
2000	Ivette Cordovez	Señorita Panamá	Miss Universe 2001	Unplaced	
2000	Ana Raquel Ochy Pozo	1st Runner-up	Miss World 2000	Unplaced	
2000	Adriana Roquer Hidalgo	2nd Runner-up	Miss Asia Pacific	Unplaced	
2001	Justine Pasek	Señorita Panamá	Miss Universe 2002	Miss Universe 2002	
2001	Lourdes Cristina González Montenegro	1st Runner-up	Miss World 2001	Unplaced	
2002	Stefanie de Roux	Señorita Panamá	Miss Universe 2003	Top 15	Top 8 in Miss Earth 2006
2002	Yoselín Sánchez Espino	1st Runner-up	Miss World 2002	Unplaced	
2003	Jessica Rodríguez	Señorita Panamá	Miss Universe 2004	Unplaced	Best National Costume
2003	Melissa Piedrahita Meléndez	1st Runner-up	Miss World 2004	Unplaced	Top 20 at Miss World Beach Beauty
2004	Rosa María Hernández	Señorita Panamá	Miss Universe 2005	Unplaced	
2005	María Alessandra Mezquita	Señorita Panamá	Miss Universe 2006	Unplaced	
2005	Anna Isabella Vaprio Medaglia	1st Runner-up	Miss World 2005	Unplaced	
2006	Giselle Bissot	Señorita Panamá	Miss World 2006	Unplaced	Top 25 at Miss World Beach Beauty . Giselle Bissot declined her participation in Miss Universe due to her studies.
2007	No Contest				Sorangel Matos, 1st Runner-Up of the 2006 pageant, was appointed to represent Panama in Miss Universe 2007.
2010	Anyolí Ábrego	Señorita Panamá	Miss Universe 2010	Unplaced	

== Realmente Bella Señorita Panamá ==
In 2008, a new production team took over the contest, calling it "Realmente Bella" and transforming the beauty pageant into a reality show. This show had weekly galas where contestants took part in special challenges to raise the level of competition. In 2009, the contest became a public window where the participants were humiliated on national TV, tarnishing the image of the beauty contest. The name of the pageant was so harmed by this reality show that it was cancelled immediately after the 2009 final.

Two editions were held Realmente Bella Señorita Panamá 2008 and Realmente Bella Señorita Panamá 2009.

Year	RB Señorita Panamá	Official Title	Represent	International	Placement	Notes
2008	Carolina Dementiev	Señorita Panamá	Panamá Centro	Miss Universe 2008	Unplaced	
2009	Diana Broce	Señorita Panamá Universo	Los Santos	Miss Universe 2009	Unplaced	Best National Costume
2009	Nadege Herrera	Señorita Panamá Mundo	Panamá Centro	Miss World 2009	5th Runner-Up	1st Runner-up at Miss World Beach Beauty Top 12 at Miss World Top Model Top 12 at Designer Dress

== Señorita Panamá (2016–present) ==
=== History ===
in 2016 Medcom Corporation lost the right of Miss Universe pageant. Miss Universe 2002 Justine Pasek & César Anel Rodríguez acquire the rights of the title Señorita Panamá and the opportunity to select the candidate who represent the country in Miss Universe (2016 - 2021, 2024 -), Miss World (2016 to 2018), Miss International (2017 - 2023), Miss Earth (2015 to 2018), Miss Grand International (2019 to 2021) and in 2020 acquires the Miss Supranational franchise (2020 to 2022). Señorita Panamá S.A. organization it is the company that will manage and represent Panama in this beauty contests.

=== Titleholders ===
Color key

- Declared as Winner
- Ended as runner-up
- Ended as one of the finalists or semifinalists

Year	Señorita Panamá	Official Title	Represent	International	Placement	Notes
2016	Keity Mendieta	Señorita Panamá Universe	Panamá Centro	Miss Universe 2016	Top 13	
2016	Alessandra Bueno	Señorita Panamá World	Panamá Centro	Miss World 2016	Unplaced	Top 24 at Beauty with a Purpose; Top 24 at Miss World Sport
2016	Virginia Hernández	Señorita Panamá Earth	Panamá Centro	Miss Earth 2016	Unplaced	
2017	Laura Sofía De Sanctis Natera	Señorita Panamá Universe	Contadora	Miss Universe 2017	Unplaced	Miss Congeniality
2017	Julianne Brittón	Señorita Panamá World	Taboga	Miss World 2017	Unplaced	Top 30 at Miss World Top Model
2017	Darelys Santos	Señorita Panamá International	Panamá Norte	Miss International 2017	Top 15	
2017	Erika Parker	Señorita Panamá Earth	Colon	Miss Earth 2017	Unplaced	
2018	Rosa Montezuma	Señorita Panamá Universe	Comarcas	Miss Universe 2018	Unplaced	
2018	Solaris Barba	Señorita Panamá World	Herrera	Miss World 2018	Top 12	Miss World America; Top 18 at Miss World Talent; Top 32 at Miss World Top Model; Top 24 at Miss World Sport; Top 12 at Beauty with a Purpose
2018	Shirel Ortiz	Señorita Panamá International	Panamá Centro	Miss International 2018	Unplaced	
2018	Diana Lemos	Señorita Panamá Earth	Isla San José	Miss Earth 2018	Unplaced	
2019	Mehr Eliezer	Señorita Panamá Universe	Isla Flamenco	Miss Universe 2019	Unplaced	
2019	Betzaida Elizabeth Rodríguez	Señorita Panamá International	Los Santos	Miss International 2019	Unplaced	
2019	Carmen Irina Drayton	Señorita Panamá Grand International	Portobelo	Miss Grand International 2019	3rd Runner-Up	Best in Swimsuit; Top 20 at Best National Costume; Top 20 at Coronas Honorables George Wittels
2020	Carmen Jaramillo	Señorita Panamá Universe	Panamá Este	Miss Universe 2020	Unplaced	
2020	Valeria Estefanía Franceschi Alvarado	Señorita Panamá International	Panamá Centro	Miss International 2021	-	declined her participation due to her studies
2020	Darelys Santos	Señorita Panamá Supranational	Panamá Norte	Miss Supranational 2021	Top 24	Miss Supranational Top Model; Miss Supranational Top Model Americas
2020	Angie Keith	Señorita Panamá Grand International	Bocas del Toro	Miss Grand International 2020	Top 20	Top 10 at Best National Costume
2021	Brenda Smith	Señorita Panamá Universe	Panamá Centro	Miss Universe 2021	Top 16	
2021	Katheryn Giselle Yejas Riaño	Señorita Panamá Grand International	Taboga	Miss Grand International 2022	-	Withdrew because the Org. lost the franchise
2021	Cecilia Del Carmen Medina	Señorita Panamá Supranational	Casco Antiguo	Miss Supranational 2022	Unplaced	
2022	Ivis Nicole Snyder	Señorita Panamá	Los Santos	Miss International 2022	Unplaced	
2023	Linette Marie Clément Marciaga	Señorita Panamá	Isla del Rey	Miss International 2023	Top 15	
2024	Italy Mora	Señorita Panamá Universe	Riviera del Canal	Miss Universe 2024	Withdrew	
2024	Italy Mora	Miss Cosmo Panama	Riviera del Canal	Miss Cosmo 2025	Top 5	Cosmo Beauty Icon Award
2024	Mirna Alejandra Caballini Bouche	Señorita Panamá Universe	Chiriquí	Miss Universe 2025	Unplaced	
2026	Gabriela Lineth González del Valle	Señorita Panamá	Chiriquí	Miss Universe 2026	TBA	
2026	Carmen Johany Quintero Pittí	Señorita Panamá International	Chiriquí Occidente	Miss International 2026	TBA	

== Other pageants in Panamá ==
=== Miss Universe Panamá ===
==== History ====
In 2022 the Señorita Panamá Organization lost the right of Miss Universe pageant. Ricardo Canto acquire the rights of the title "Miss Universe Panamá" creating a new contest that will select the representative to Miss Universe separately. In 2023 the organization is renamed Miss Panama once again.

Year	Miss Universe Panamá	Official Title	State	International	Placement	Notes
2022	Solaris Barba	Miss Universe Panamá	Herrera	Miss Universe 2022	Unplaced	

=== Miss World Panamá ===
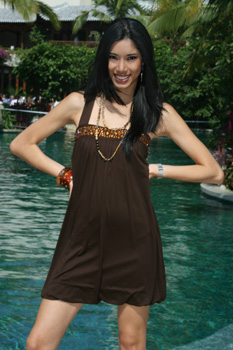
Shey Ling Him, Miss World Panamá 2007

In 2003, Corporación MEDCOM, which owned the rights to Miss World, could not produce a pageant in time to select a representative to Miss World in Sanya. Therefore, the Miss World Organization contacted Promociones Gloria in Bolivia to help select a contestant; they were able to secure a contestant from Tania Hyman's Models and Talents for that year only, named Ivy Ruth Ortega Coronas.

In 2007, the Señorita Panamá pageant was not held and the agency Panama Talents, organizers of Mr. Panamá, got the franchise for Miss World. They organized a small contest called Miss World Panamá for 2007. In 2008 they appointed the 1st runner-up of the 2007 pageant to represent Panama but she was unable to travel to Johannesburg due to visa issues. Therefore, Panama was not represented in Miss World 2008.

In 2009, Corporacion MEDCOM announced that they would crown a representative to Miss World, but the license was under the property of local businessman Olais Padilla who signed an agreement with the TV station so Nadege Herrera could compete. In 2010 Padilla organized a local competition called Miss Mundo Panamá, won by Paola Vaprio Medaglia.

From 2011 to 2015 the Miss World license was awarded to Marisela Moreno of Miss Panama Organization. After the dissolution of the Miss Panama pageant, Miss World awarded the license to event producer Edwin Dominguez, who had an agreement with Señorita Panamá for three years (2016–2018).

For 2019, a new competition will take place, completely separated from Señorita Panamá.

Year	Miss World Panamá	Official Title	State	International	Placement	Notes
2003	Ivy Ruth Ortega Coronas	Miss World Panamá	Panama Centro	Miss World 2003	Unplaced	
2007	Shey Ling Him	Miss World Panamá	Cocle	Miss World 2007	Unplaced	
2008	Kathia Katiuska Saldaña Ortega	Miss World Panamá	Panama Centro	Withdrew	-	1st runner-up, Miss World Panama 2007; Withdrew due to visa problems
2010	Paola Vaprio Medaglia	Miss World Panamá	Panama Centro	Miss World 2010	Unplaced	
2019	Agustina Ruíz Arrechea	Miss World Panamá	Herrera	Miss World 2019	Unplaced	Top 32 Miss World Sport; Top 27 Miss World Talent
2020	Krysthelle Barreto Reichlin	Miss World Panamá	Panama Centro	Miss World 2021	Unplaced	
2022	Kathleen Pérez Coffre	Miss World Panamá	Bocas del Toro	Miss World 2023	Unplaced	Top 32 Miss World Sport
2023	Karol Esther Rodríguez	Miss World Panamá	Panama Norte	Miss World 2025	Top 40	
2026	Madeline Elena Miller Vergara	Miss World Panamá	Panama Centro	Miss World 2026	Unplaced	Top 24 Sports Challenge; Top 60 Top Model Challenge

=== Miss Panamá International ===
Color key

- Declared as Winner
- Ended as runner-up
- Ended as one of the finalists or semifinalists

Some delegates of Panama were appointed to represent Panama in Miss International (officially titled The International Beauty Pageant) from 1960 to 2003. The first Panamenian delegate in Miss International was Angela María Alcové, sent in 1961.

Year	Miss Panamá International	Estate	Placement	Note
1961	Angela María Alcové	Herrera	Top 15	
1962	Ana Cecilia Maruri	Panama Centro	2nd Runner-up	
1963	Mariela Aguirre		Unplaced	
1964	Gloria María Navarrete		Unplaced	
1965	Silvia García		Unplaced	
1971	Betzabé Delgado		Unplaced	
1984	Vielka Mariana Marciac		Top 15	Miss Elegance
1985	Diana Marina Lau	Darien	Unplaced	
1986	Nidia Esther Pérez		Unplaced	
1987	Amarilis Aurelia Sandoval	Los Santos	Unplaced	
1988	Xelmira del Carmen Tristán		Unplaced	
1989	Jenia Mayela Nenzen	Panama Centro	Unplaced	
1990	Angela Patricia Vergara		Unplaced	
1991	Jessica Inés Lacayo		Unplaced	
1992	Lizbeth del Carmen Achurra		Unplaced	
1993	Ismenia Isabel Velásquez		Unplaced	
1994	Dinora Acevedo González	Los Santos	Unplaced	
1995	Lorena Hernández Montero		Unplaced	
1996	Betzy Janethe Achurra		Unplaced	
1998	Lía Victoria Borrero González	Los Santos	Miss International 1998	Finalist in Miss Universe 1997 Top 6
1999	Blanca Elena Espinosa Tuffolon		Unplaced	
2000	Cristina Marie Sousa Broce		Unplaced	
2002	Cristina Herrera	Los Santos	Unplaced	

=== Miss International Panamá ===
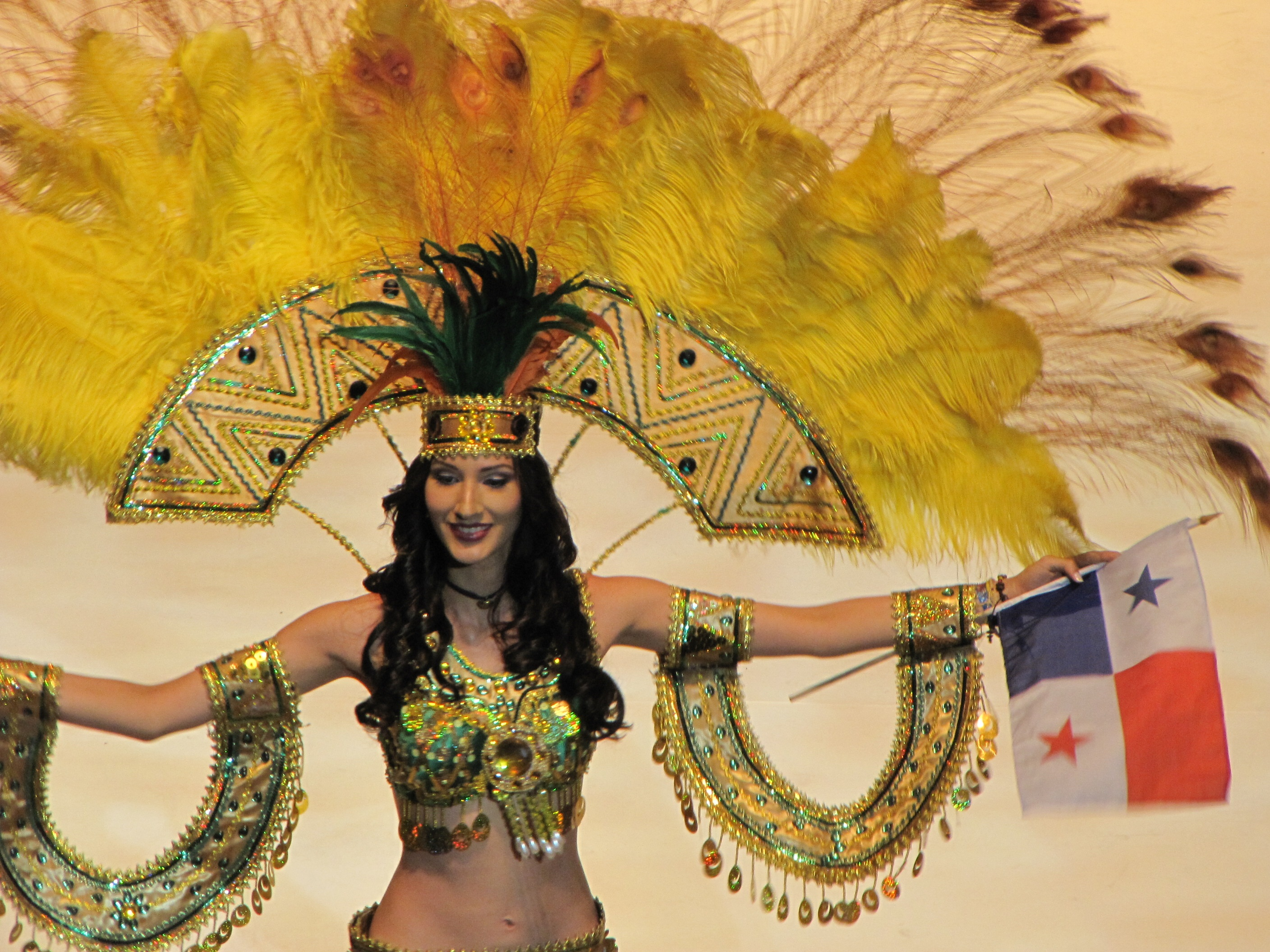
Karen Jordán, Miss Internacional Panamá 2012

Created in 2004, this contest sends winners to the Miss International pageant in Japan. Tania Hyman's Models and Talents organize the pageant from 2004 to 2014. In the 2009 the Miss Internacional Panamá contest is fused to the new contest called Bellezas Panamá. From 2015 to 2016 other organization elected the new winner, in the 2017 the franchise was acquired by Cesar Anel to which eventually tied up with the Senorita Panama from 2017 to 2023.

Year	Miss International Panamá	Official Title	Represent	Placement	Notes
2004	Anabella Hale	Miss International Panamá	Panama Oeste	Unplaced	
2005	Lucía Graciela Matamoros	Miss International Panamá	Panama Centro	Unplaced	
2006	Mayte Sánchez González	Miss International Panamá	Panama Centro	1st Runner-Up	Best National Costume /4th Runner-up in Señorita Panamá 2004
2007	Stephanie Araúz Shaw	Miss International Panamá	Panama Centro	Unplaced	
2008	Alejandra Arias Rivera	Miss International Panamá	Panama Centro	Unplaced	
2009	Joyce Jacobi	Miss International Panamá	Chiriquí	Top 15	
2010	Michelle Ostler Cosme	Miss International Panamá	Panama Centro	Unplaced	
2011	Keity Mendieta	Miss International Panamá	Panama Centro	4th Runner-up	Virreina in Miss Panamá 2011, Miss Panamá 2016
2012	Karen Jordán	Miss International Panamá	Chiriquí	Unplaced	
2013	Betzy Madrid	Miss International Panamá	Panama Centro	Unplaced	
2014	Aileen Bernal	Miss International Panamá	Los Santos	Top 10	
2015	Jhasmeiry Cristina Herrera Evans	Miss International Panamá	Colon	Unplaced	
2016	Daniela Ochoa Barragán	Miss International Panamá	Panama Centro	Unplaced	
2017	Darelys Santos	Miss International Panamá	Panamá Norte	Top 15	
2018	Shirel Ortiz	Miss International Panamá	Panama Centro	Unplaced	
2019	Betzaida Elizabeth Rodríguez	Miss International Panamá	Los Santos	Unplaced	
2022	Ivis Nicole Snyder	Miss International Panamá	Los Santos	Unplaced	
2023	Linette Marie Clément Marciaga	Miss International Panamá	Isla del Rey	Top 15	
2024	Liliam Ashby Barrera	Miss International Panamá	Panama Centro	Unplaced	
2026	Carmen Johany Quintero Pittí	Miss International Panamá	Chiriquí Occidente	TBA	

=== Miss Earth Panamá ===
Color key

- Declared as Winner
- Ended as runner-up
- Ended as one of the finalists or semifinalists

Physical Modelos agency, which owned the Miss Asia Pacific license since the 1990s, was awarded the franchise from 2002 to 2007 when Carousel Productions changed the name of their event. Tania Hyman's Models and Talents acquired the franchise in 2001 and reacquired it for 2008 to 2014. From 2015 to 2018, the franchise was acquired by Señorita Panamá. From 2019 to 2020, the franchise is property of Miss Earth Panamá pageant under the direction of Diana Lemos Lee. In 2021 the franchise is acquired by Marlon Polo. From 2022 to 2023 Panameña Universal org. acquired the franchise.

Year	Miss Earth Panamá	Official Title	Represent	Placement	Notes
2001	Aliana Yaneth Khan Zambrano	Miss Earth Panamá	Panama Centro	Unplaced	
2002	Carolina Miranda	Miss Earth Panamá	Bocas del Toro	Unplaced	
2003	Jessica Doralis Segui Barrios†(2010)	Miss Earth Panamá	Los Santos	Unplaced	Best in National Costume
2004	Ingrid Ivana González Caballero	Miss Earth Panamá	Veraguas	-	Withdrew
2005	Rosemary Isabel Suárez Macharek	Miss Earth Panamá	Panama Centro	Unplaced	
2006	Stefanie de Roux	Miss Earth Panamá	Panama Centro	Top 8	
2007	Nadege Herrera	Miss Earth Panamá	Panama Centro	-	Withdrew
2008	Shassia Ubillús	Miss Earth Panamá	Panama Centro	Unplaced	Best in National Costume
2009	Geraldine Higuera	Miss Earth Panamá	Panama Oeste	Unplaced	
2010	Nicole Morrell	Miss Earth Panamá	Panama Centro	Unplaced	
2011	Marelissa Him	Miss Earth Panamá	Panama Centro	Unplaced	
2012	Ana Ibáñez	Miss Earth Panamá	Coclé	Unplaced	
2013	Johanna Batista	Miss Earth Panamá	Panama Centro	Unplaced	(silver) Friendship (Group 2); (bronze) Best School Tour Teachers (Group 2)
2014	María Gallimore	Miss Earth Panamá	Panama Centro	Unplaced	(gold) National Costume
2015	Carmen Jaramillo	Miss Earth Panamá	Panama Oeste	Unplaced	(gold) Long Gown; (gold) Sport; (gold) Cocktail Wear; (silver) National Costume (The Americas)
2016	Virginia Hernández	Miss Earth Panamá	Panama Centro	Unplaced	(silver) Long Gown (Group 3)
2017	Erika Parker	Miss Earth Panamá	Colon	Unplaced	(bronze) Long Gown (Group 1)
2018	Diana Lemos Lee	Miss Earth Panamá	Isla San José	Unplaced	(silver) National Costume (North & Central America)
2019	Marianna Fuentes Pereira	Miss Earth Panamá	Panama Centro	Unplaced	(silver) National Costume (Americas)
2020	Anayansi Cristel De Gracia	Miss Earth Panamá	Chiriquí	Top 20	(bronze) Resort Wear (America)
2021	Jillyan Aleida Chue Rodríguez	Miss Earth Panamá	Colon	Unplaced	
2022	Valerie Clairisse Solís Valderrama	Miss Earth Panamá	Panama Centro	Unplaced	(silver) Talent Competition (Fire Group)
2023	Nicole Castillero	Miss Earth Panamá	Coclé	-	Withdrew

=== Miss Cosmo Panamá ===
In 2025, Organización Elite Group Panamá took the Miss Cosmo franchise and appointed the first delegate in the same year.

Year	Miss Cosmo Panamá	Official Title	State	International	Placement	Notes
2025	Italy Mora	Miss Cosmo Panamá	Riviera del Canal	Miss Cosmo 2025	Top 5	Cosmo Beauty Icon Award
2026	Lainey Marie Floeck Looney	Miss Cosmo Panamá	Panama Centro	Miss Cosmo 2026	TBA	

=== Miss Balboa, Panama Canal Zone / Miss Panama Canal Zone America ===
In 1925, at that year's Miss America pageant, a contestant represented Balboa in the Panama Canal Zone at the pageant. The Panama Canal Zone was directly administered by the United States and was thus considered US soil, thus allowing the contestant to compete.

Year	Miss Panama Canal Zone America	Local Title	Represent	Talent	Placement	Notes
1925	Rena De Young	Miss Balboa		N/A	Unplaced	No talent at Miss America as talent was not established in the pageant until 1935. Competed under local title at Miss America pageant

== See also ==
- Mister Panamá
