= Shey Ling Him =

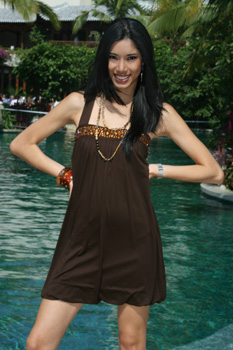
- Born: Shey Ling Him Gordon; 19 September 1986 (age 39); Penonome, Panama
- Height: 1.79 m (5 ft 10 1/2 in)
- Beauty pageant titleholder
- Title: Miss Panama World 2007
- Hair color: Black
- Eye color: Black

Shey Ling Him Gordon is a Panamanian model and beauty pageant titleholder. She was the official representative of Panama at the Miss World 2007 pageant held at the Crown of Beauty Theatre, Sanya, China on December 1, 2007. She competed in the national beauty pageant Miss World Panamá 2007 and obtained the title of Miss World Panamá.

== Miss World Panamá 2007 ==
She competed and won the national beauty pageant Miss World Panamá 2007 held in the Ball Room of the Hotel Miramar, on October 3, 2007. Shey represented Cocle. The 1st runner up was Kathia Saldaña from Panamá City (Later Miss World Panamá 2008 but withdrew).

Awards and achievements
Preceded by Giselle Bissot	Miss Panama World; 2007	Succeeded by Kathia Saldaña
