= Gloria Karamañites =

Panamanian model and beauty queen

- Born: Gloria Karamañites; 24 December 1960 (age 65); Panama City, Panama
- Height: 1.80 m (5 ft 11 in)
- Beauty pageant titleholder
- Title: Miss Panama Universe 1980
- Hair color: Black
- Eye color: Black
- Major competitions: Miss Panamá 1980 (Winner); Miss Universe 1980 (Top 12)
- Occupations: Pageant titleholder, actress, artist's model
- Years active: 1960–
- Children: Lamar Bailey Karamañites

Gloria Karamañites (born 24 December 1960) is a Panamanian actress and beauty pageant titleholder. She became the first Black woman to win the Miss Panamá beauty pageant title in 1980 and is the subject of the Miss Panama (2021) documentary.

Karamañites competed in the national beauty pageant Miss Panamá 1980, representing the Colón Province. During the final competition, pageant officials tried to block her victory by having her answer an additional obscure legal question. Karamañites' victory was celebrated as a success for Afro-Panamanians and Afro-descendants in Panama. She was the first Black Panamanian to have won the Miss Panamá competition.

She represented Panama in Miss Universe 1980, and placed among the 12 semifinalists, obtaining the title of Miss Panamá Universo. She represented Panama Centro state.

Karamañites's experiences with racism towards Panama's Afro-descendant community during the Miss Panamá 1980 contest were the subject of a documentary, Miss Panama (2021). The documentary was co-directed by her daughter, Lamar Bailey Karamañites, as well as filmmakers Pascale Boucicaut and David Felix Sutcliffe. The documentary premiered at the Tribeca International Film Festival in 2021.

== Filmography ==
=== Film ===
Year	Title	Role	Notes
2021	Miss Panama	Herself	She is the main subject of the documentary film

Preceded by Yahel Dolande	Miss Panamá Universe; 1980	Succeeded by Ana María Henríquez
