= Emita Arosemena =

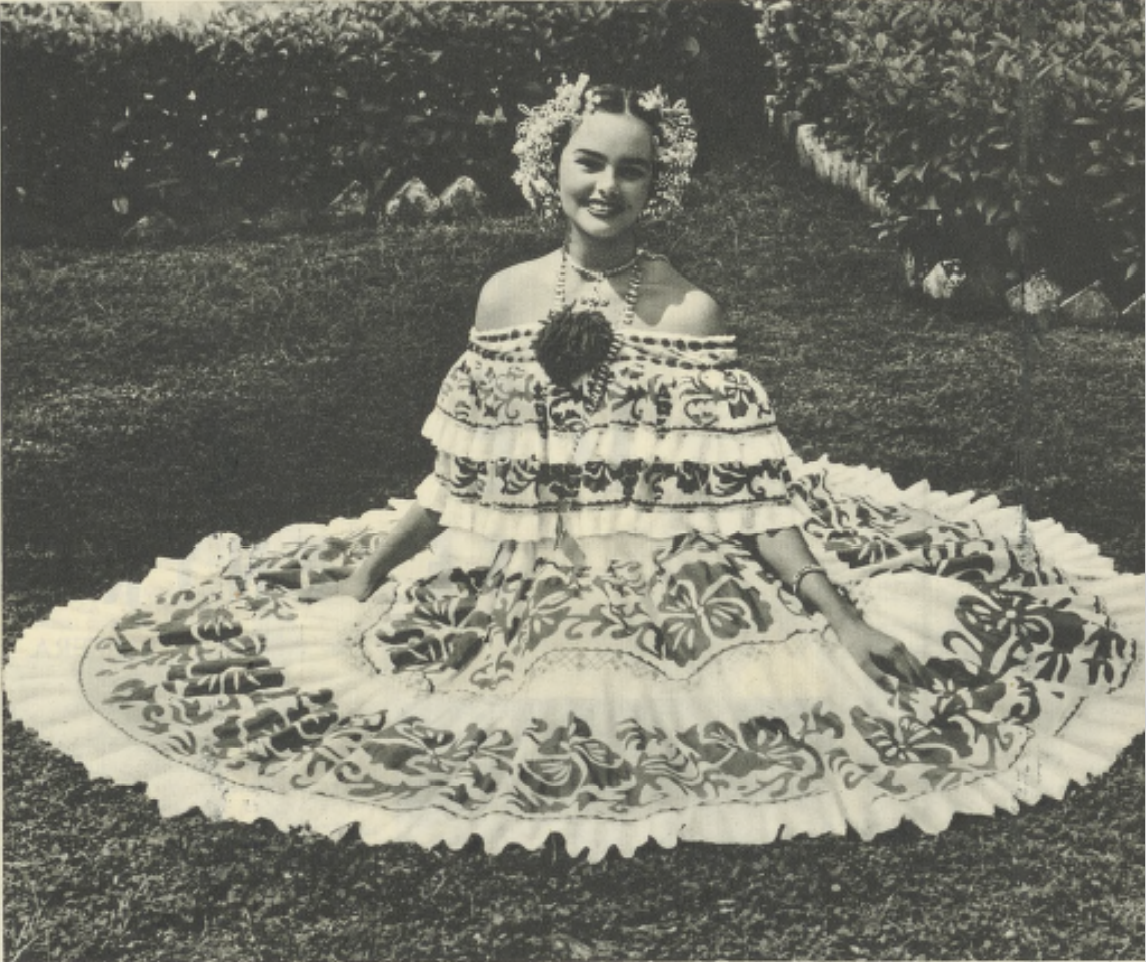
- Emita Arosemena in Mundo Hispánico, published in 1953
- Born: Emita Arosemena Zubieta c. 1931; Las Tablas, Los Santos, Panama
- Died: Uruguay
- Height: 1.70 m (5 ft 7 in)
- Beauty pageant titleholder
- Title: Miss Panama 1953
- Hair color: Black
- Eye color: Hazel
- Major competitions: Miss Panama 1953 (Winner); Miss Universe 1953 (Top 12)

Emita Arosemena Zubieta (born c. 1931) was a Panamanian model and beauty pageant titleholder who won the Miss Panamá 1953 title. She also represented Panama in Miss Universe 1953, the 2nd Miss Universe was held on July 17, 1953 at Long Beach Municipal Auditorium, Long Beach, California, United States. Arosemena, who was 5 ft 7 in (1.70 m) tall, was designated in the national beauty pageant Miss Panamá 1953 with the title of Miss Panamá Universo. She represented Los Santos state.

Arosemena died in Uruguay where she resided.

Preceded by Elzibir Gisela Malek	Miss Panamá Universe; 1953	Succeeded by Liliana Torre
