= María Sofía Velásquez =

- Born: María Sofía Velásquez Jaimes-Freyre; 1971 (age 54–55); Panama City, Panama
- Height: 1.73 m (5 ft 8 in)
- Partner: Javier Arrillaga
- Beauty pageant titleholder
- Title: Miss Panama Universe 1993
- Hair color: Brunette
- Eye color: hazel
- Major competitions: Señorita Panamá 1993 (Winner); Miss Universe 1994 (Unplaced)

María Sofía Velásquez Jaimes-Freyre (born 1971 in Panama City Panama) is a Panamanian model and beauty pageant titleholder who was crowned Señorita Panamá 1993.

== Pageantry ==
Velásquez who is 5 ft 8 in (1.73 m) tall, competed in the national beauty pageant Señorita Panamá 1993, in September 1993 and obtained the title of Señorita Panamá Universo. She represented Panamá Centro state.

She also represented Panama in Miss Universe 1994. The 43rd Miss Universe pageant was held at the Philippine International Convention Center, in Manila, Philippines on May 20, 1994.

Awards and achievements
Preceded by Giselle González	Miss Panamá; 1993-1994	Succeeded by Michele Sage
