= Miss Universe 1953 =

2nd Miss Universe pageant

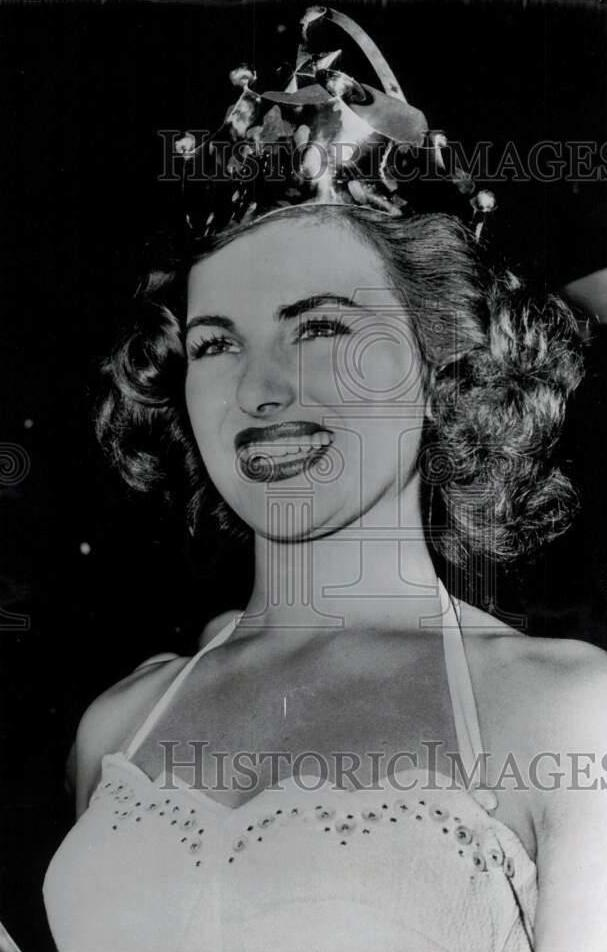
- Christiane Martel
- Date: 17 July 1953
- Presenters: Bob Russell
- Venue: Long Beach Municipal Auditorium, Long Beach, California, United States
- Entrants: 26
- Placements: 16
- Debuts: Austria; Switzerland
- Withdrawals: Chile; Cuba; Great Britain; Hong Kong; India; Israel
- Winner: Christiane Martel; France
- Congeniality: Jeanne Thompson (Louisiana)
- Photogenic: Myrna Hansen (United States)

Miss Universe 1953 was the second Miss Universe pageant, held at the Long Beach Municipal Auditorium in Long Beach, California, on 17 July 1953.

At the conclusion of the event, actress Julie Adams crowned Christiane Martel from France as Miss Universe 1953. It is the first victory of France in the pageant's history. Miss Universe 1952, Armi Kuusela of Finland was unable to crown her successor after she chose to relinquish her crown in order to marry.

Twenty-six contestants from countries and territories competed in this year's pageant, marking the smallest turnout to date for Miss Universe as of 2025. The pageant was hosted by Bob Russell. This edition also featured the Metallic Bronze Crown designed by American silversmith Allan Adler, an all-bronze crown known for its lack of rhinestones and gemstones. The crown was only used for this edition.

== Background ==
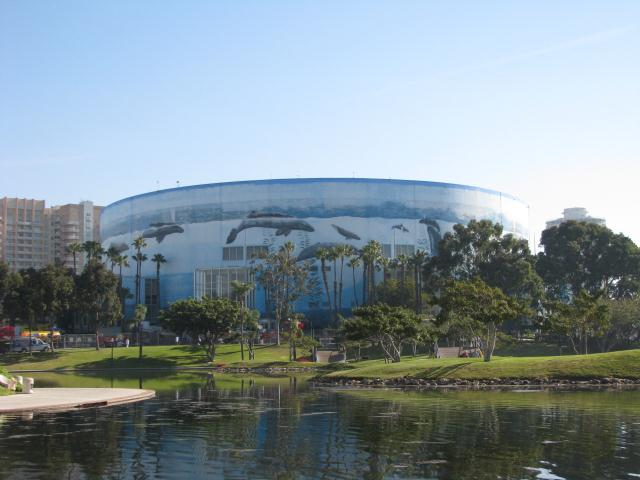
Long Beach Municipal Auditorium, the venue of Miss Universe 1953

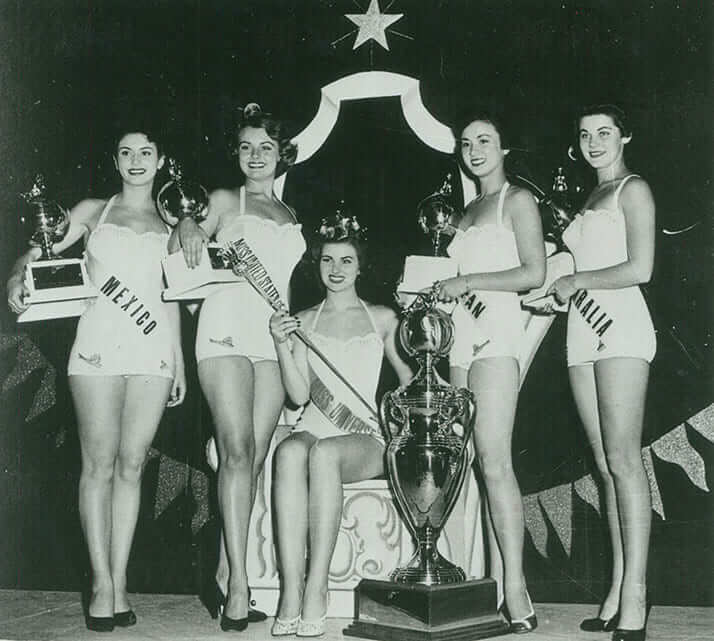
Miss Universe 1953 and her court (from left to right): Ana Bertha Lepe, Myrna Hansen, Kinuko Ito, and Maxine Morgan.

=== Selection of participants ===
Contestants from twenty-six countries and territories were selected to compete in the pageant. One contestant was selected after another national pageant was held to replace the original dethroned winner.

==== Replacements ====
After Miss France 1953, Sylviane Carpentier chose not to participate in any international pageant in order to marry, two separate competitions were held to determine the candidates of France to Miss Universe and Miss World. The Miss Cinema 1953 contest which was responsible for sending the candidate of France to Miss Universe was won by Christiane Martel.

==== Debuts and withdrawals ====
The 1953 edition saw the debuts of Austria and Switzerland, and the withdrawals of Chile, Cuba, Great Britain, Hong Kong, India, and Israel after their respective organizations failed to hold a national competition or designate a contestant. Singapore was also set to compete in this edition. However, the Miss Singapore contest was postponed to next year due to lack of time and preparation.

== Results ==
=== Placements ===
Placement	Contestant
Miss Universe 1953	France – Christiane Martel
1st Runner-Up	United States – Myrna Hansen
2nd Runner-Up	Japan – Kinuko Ito
3rd Runner-Up	Mexico – Ana Bertha Lepe
4th Runner-Up	Australia – Maxine Morgan
Top 16	Austria – Lore Felger; Canada – Thelma Brewis; Denmark – Jytte Olsen; Italy – Rita Stazzi; Norway – Synnøve Gulbrandsen; Panama – Emita Arosemena; Peru – Mary Ann Sarmiento; South Africa – Ingrid Mills; Turkey – Ayten Akyol; Uruguay – Alicia Ibáñez; West Germany – Christel Schaack

== Pageant ==
=== Format ===
From ten semi-finalists in 1952, sixteen semi-finalists were chosen at the preliminary competition that consists of the swimsuit and evening gown competition. Each of the sixteen semi-finalists gave a short speech during the final telecast using their native languages. Afterwards, the sixteen semi-finalists paraded again in their swimsuits and evening gowns, and the five finalists were eventually chosen.

=== Selection committee ===
- Jeff Chandler – American actor
- Arlene Dahl – American actress
- Rhonda Fleming – American actress, singer
- Constance Moore – American actress, singer
- Bud Westmore – American make-up artist for film

== Contestants ==
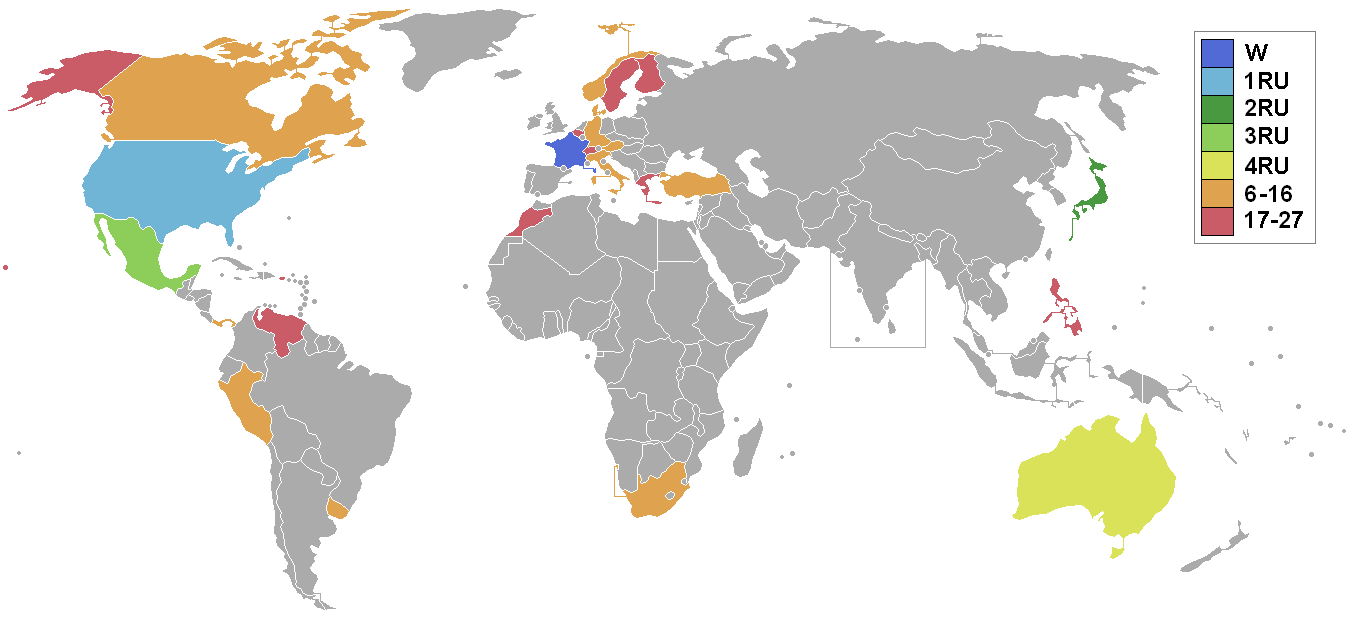
Miss Universe 1953 participating countries and territories

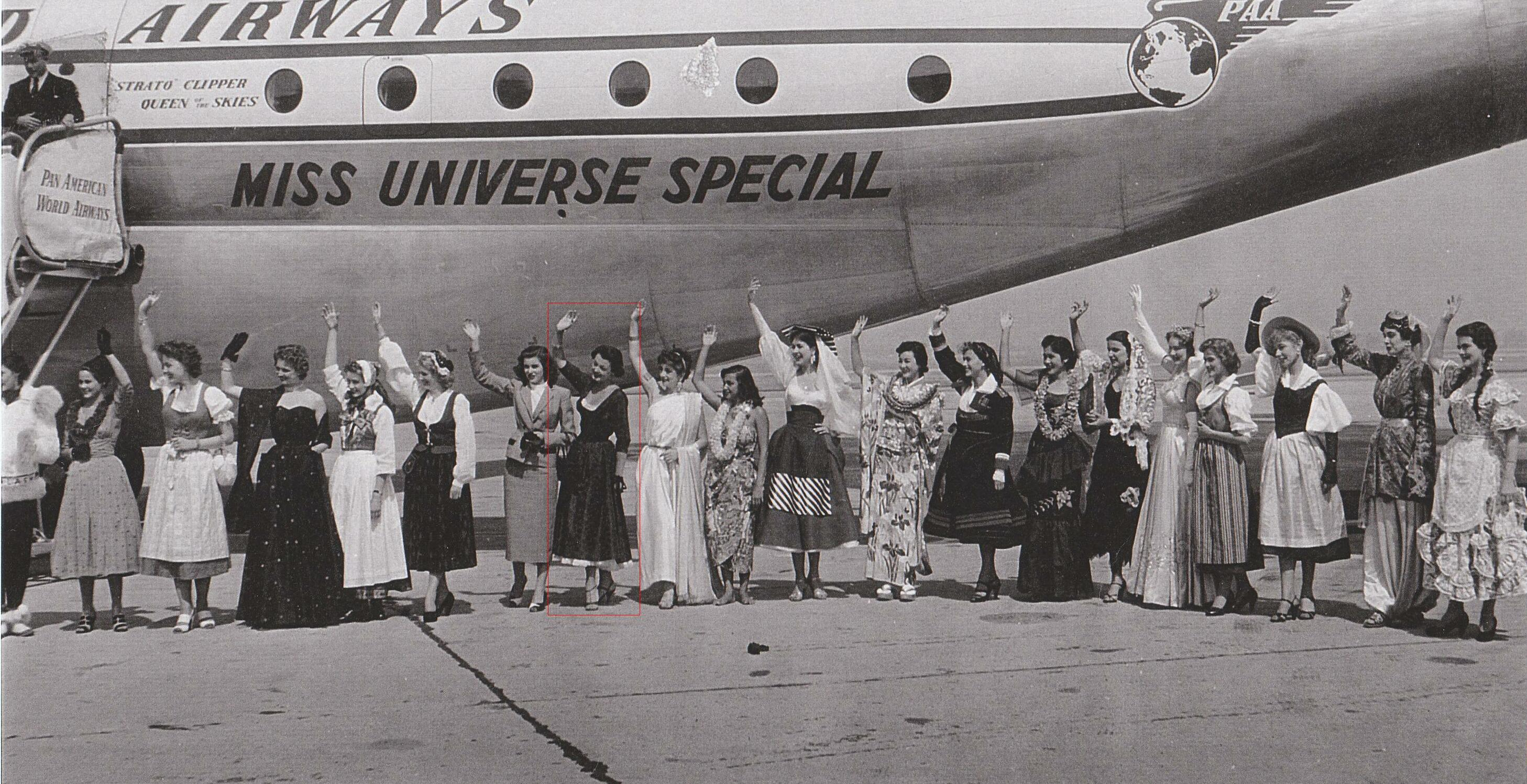
The Miss Universe 1953 contestants in Long Beach, California

Twenty-six contestants competed for the title.

Country/Territory	Contestant	Age (Note: Ages at the time of the pageant)	Hometown
Alaska	Muriel Hagberg	18	Fairbanks
Australia	Maxine Morgan	20	Sydney
Austria	Lore Felger	18	Vienna
Belgium	Elayne Cortois	23	Brussels
Canada	Thelma Brewis	21	Ontario
Denmark	Jytte Olsen	18	Gilleleje
Finland	Teija Sopanen	20	Tampere
France	Christiane Martel	18	Paris
Greece	Doreta Xirou	19	Athens
Hawaii	Aileen Stone	20	Honolulu
Italy	Rita Stazzi	21	Milan
Japan	Kinuko Ito	21	Tokyo
Mexico	Ana Bertha Lepe	18	Tecolotlán
Norway	Synnøve Gulbrandsen	23	Oslo
Panama	Emita Arosemena	22	Panama City
Peru	Mary Ann Sarmiento	22	Ucayali
Philippines	Cristina Pacheco	18	Manila
Puerto Rico	Wanda Irizarry	20	Rio Piedras
South Africa	Ingrid Mills	20	Salisbury, Rhodesia
Sweden	Ulla Sandklef	18	Gothenburg
Switzerland	Danielle Oudinet	20	Lausanne
Turkey	Ayten Akyol	21	Istanbul
United States	Myrna Hansen	18	Chicago
Uruguay	Alicia Ibáñez	23	Montevideo
Venezuela	Gisela Bolaños	20	Carabobo
West Germany	Christel Schaack	18	Berlin
