= Señorita Panamá 1991 =

- Date: September 1991
- Presenters: Maite Delgado
- Entertainment: Luis Miguel
- Venue: Atlapa Convention Centre, Panama City, Panama
- Broadcaster: RPC Televisión
- Entrants: 13
- Winner: Ana Cecilia Orillac Arias; Distrito Central

Señorita Panamá 1991, the ninth Señorita Panamá pageant, was held in Teatro Anayansi Centro de Convenciones Atlapa, Panama City, Panama, in September 1991, after weeks of events. The winner of the pageant was Ana Orillac.

The pageant was broadcast live on RPC Televisión and produced with the collaboration of Venevision. About 13 contestants from all over Panamá competed for the prestigious crown. At the conclusion of the final night of competition, outgoing titleholder Liz De León crowned Ana Orillac as the new Señorita Panamá.

Orillac competed in the 41st edition of the Miss Universe 1992 pageant, held at Queen Sirikit National Convention Center, Bangkok, Thailand on May 8, 1992.

== Final result ==
Final results	Contestant
Señorita Panamá-Miss Universe 1992	Ana Cecilia Orillac Arias
Señorita Panamá-Miss Mundo 1991	Malena Estela Betancourt Guillén
Señorita Panamá-Miss Hispanidad 1991	Janell Cosca Tovío
1st runner-up	Anoland Mcdonald
2nd runner-up	Greta Crusoe

=== Special awards ===
Final results	Topic
Best National Costume to Miss Universe	Pollera Panameña

== Contestants ==
These are the competitors who have been selected this year.

Represent	Contestant	Age	Height	Hometown
1	Janell Cosca Tovío	-	mts	Panama City
2	Ileana Maucci	-	mts	
3	Yelena Quintero	-	mts	
4	Ana Cecilia Orillac	-	mts	
5	Sogna Bravo	-	mts	
6	Donna Edgill	-	-mts	
7	Lorena Calvo	-	mts	
8	Jenny Potes	-	mts	
9	Malena Bethancourt	-	mts	Panama City
10	Leticia Tristan Benavides	-	mts	
11	Edith Castillo	-	mts	
12	Anoland McDonald	-	-mts	
13	Greta Crusoe	-	-mts	
14	Luzmina Jalil	-	-mts	

== Election schedule ==
- Thursday September 1991 Final night, coronation Señorita Panamá 1991

== Candidates notes ==
Janell Cosca Tovío †
