= Señorita Panamá 1994 =

Beauty pageant edition

- Date: September 3, 1994
- Presenters: Luis Farias, Rosanna Uribe, Madelaine Leignadier, Eduardo Palomo
- Entertainment: Christian Castro, Alejandra Guzman
- Venue: Atlapa Convention Centre, Panama City, Panama
- Broadcaster: RPC Televisión
- Entrants: 16
- Winner: Michelle Sage Navarrete; Panama City

Señorita Panamá 1994 was the 12th Señorita Panamá pageant. It was held in Atlapa Convention Centre on September 3, 1994, after weeks of events. The pageant was broadcast on September 12 through RPC Televisión. 16 contestants from all over the country competed for the prestigious crown. At the conclusion of the final night of competition, outgoing titleholder Maria Sofia Velazquez crowned Michelle Sage Navarrete as the new Señorita Panamá.

== Final result ==
Final results	Contestant
Señorita Panamá – Miss Universe 1995	Michelle Jeannette Sage Navarrete
Señorita Panamá – Miss Mundo 1994	Carmen Lucía Ogando Giono
Señorita Panamá – Miss Hispanidad 1995	Marilyn del Carmen González
Señorita Panamá – Nuestra Belleza Internacional 1994	Gisela Castillo
1st Runner-Up	Ana María Davis

== Contestants ==
These are the competitors who have been selected this year.

Represent	Contestant	Age	Height (m)	Hometown
1	Rissel Esmir Tristán Caballero	18	1.68	Santiago de Veraguas
2	Sandra Martínez Patrone	21	1.70	Chitré
3	Leticia Pinilla González	18	1.70	Ocú
4	Jessica Loaiza	19	1.71	Arraiján
5	Lorena Chan	22	1.71	Panama City
6	Jessica Aranda Carrizo	20	1.71	Santiago de Veraguas
7	Berta Alina Toral Morán	21	1.72	Chorrera
8	Michelle Sage Navarrete	24	1.72	Panama City
9	Ana María Davis	19	1.73	Colón
10	Ritela Mojica	21	1.74	Pedasí
11	Marilyn del Carmen González	25	1.75	Panama City
12	Carmen Lucía Ogando Giono	19	1.76	Colón
13	Gisela Castillo	24	1.77	Panama City
14	Cynthia Arosarena Harper	24	1.78	Panama City
15	Noryvette Moltó Montaña	22	1.80	Chiriquí
16	Lorena Méndez González	22	1.83	Panama City
