= Taboga Island =

Pacific island belonging to Panama

Native name: Isla Taboga Nickname: "Island of Flowers"
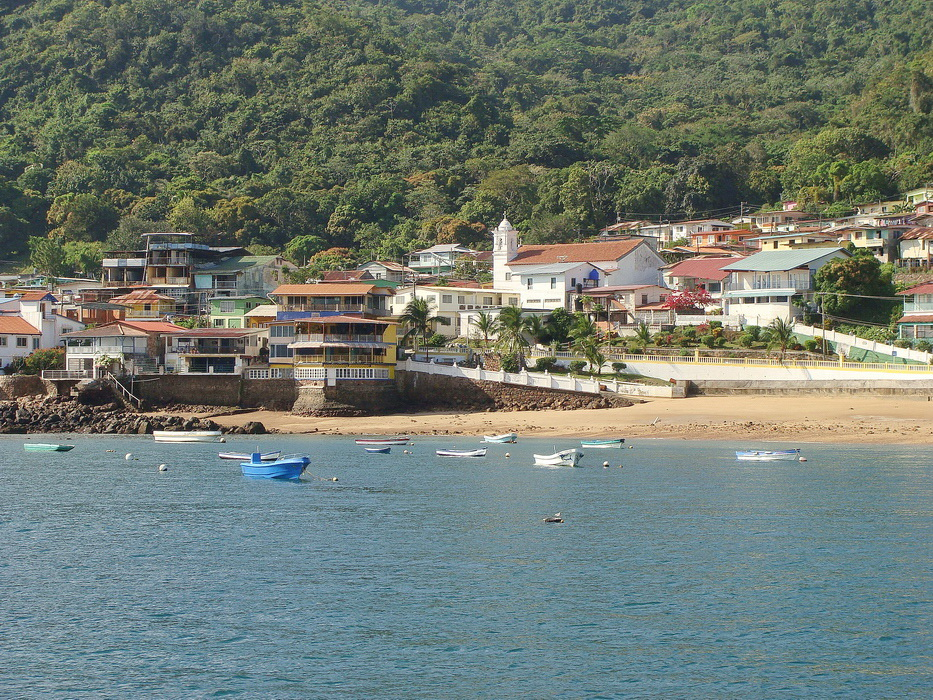

- Location within Panama

Geography
- Location: Gulf of Panama
- Coordinates: 8°47′0″N 79°33′0″W
- Area: 12.1 km^{2} (4.7 sq mi)

Administration
- Panama
- Province: Panamá
- District: Taboga

Demographics
- Population: 1,629
- Pop. density: 134.6/km^{2} (348.6/sq mi)

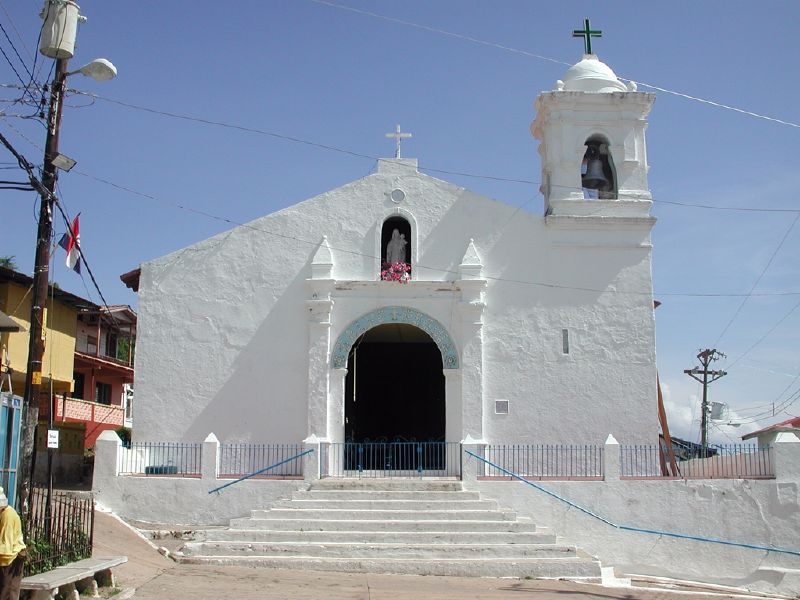
San Pedro church, which claims to be the second oldest church in the Western Hemisphere

Taboga Island (Spanish: Isla Taboga), also known as the "Island of Flowers", is a volcanic island in the Gulf of Panama. It is a tourist destination, with a small population of approximately 1,600 people, about 20 km (12 mi) from Panama City, Panama.

== Geography ==
At low tide, the northern end of the island is joined by a sand bar to the small island of El Morro, and the south-eastern end is 270 m (886 ft) from the neighbouring Urabá Island. The island has a tropical rain forest climate (Af), with average daytime temperatures of 28 °C (82 °F). It is famous for its beautiful beaches, clear waters, soft sands and wildlife refuge.

=== Important Bird Area ===
The Taboga group, including neighbouring Urabá, Taboguilla and Chamá Islands, has been designated an Important Bird Area (IBA) by BirdLife International because it supports significant breeding colonies of brown pelicans. Other resident birds include brown boobies, neotropic cormorants, great egrets and black-crowned night-herons, as well as an endemic subspecies of streaked saltator. The Panama least gecko has been recorded.

== History ==
The island was discovered in the 16th century and was originally named Isla de San Pedro by the Spanish explorer Vasco Núñez de Balboa. Its current name derives from an Indian word aboga ("many fish"). The island's first settlers were Indian slaves from Venezuela and Nicaragua. The small town of San Pedro was founded in 1524 by Hernando de Luque, dean of the Panama cathedral. The town church of the same name is claimed to be the second-oldest church in the hemisphere. Rose of Lima (1586–1617), the first Catholic saint of the Americas, may have been born on the island.

In 1671 during Henry Morgan's sack of Panama English privateers led by Robert Searle raided and scoured the island as well as ones nearby looking for treasure and captives. The French painter Paul Gauguin visited the island in 1887.

=== Paul Gauguin in Taboga ===
Having worked for the first (French) attempt to dig a canal from the Caribbean Sea to the Pacific, an attempt in which 22,000 workers lost their life, the French painter Paul Gauguin, taken ill, was sent for treatment in Taboga Island. He then returned to France, with a stopover in Martinique, and then left for the Marquesas. His stay in Taboga is marked by an engraved plate on the island's main beach.

== Tourism ==
Tourism is the major economic activity on the island, although fishing and agriculture are also practiced. The island has become a popular touristic attraction due to its natural areas and its proximity to Panama City. Daily ferries link the city to the island, most of them departing from the Amador Causeway.

Apart from beaches, the island has trails for hiking to its highest points, including Cerro Vigía and Cerro de la Cruz. The latter is a hill located south of the town, topped with a huge cross. Many activities are available such as boat tours for fishing, whale-watching, snorkeling, mountain tours and sightseeing, as well as walking and nature tours.

The Cementerio do Taboga (Cemetery of Taboga), the oldest cemetery on the island, has decorative headstones and graves.
