= Causeway Islands =

Settlement in Panama

Coordinates: 8.913°N 79.525°W

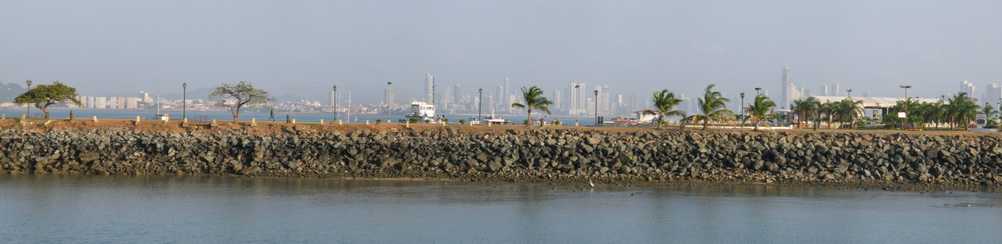
Causeway

The Causeway Islands (Spanish: Islas Calzada de Amador) are four small islands by the Pacific entrance to the Panama Canal. They are linked to the mainland via a causeway, made from rock extracted during the excavations from the Panama Canal. In part the causeway was meant to serve as a breakwater for the entrance.

A four-lane road runs along the causeway to each island, and there is a bicycle/jogging path as well.

The islands are as follows:

- Naos - home to a research lab run by the Smithsonian Tropical Research Institute (STRI).
- Culebra
- Perico
- Flamenco

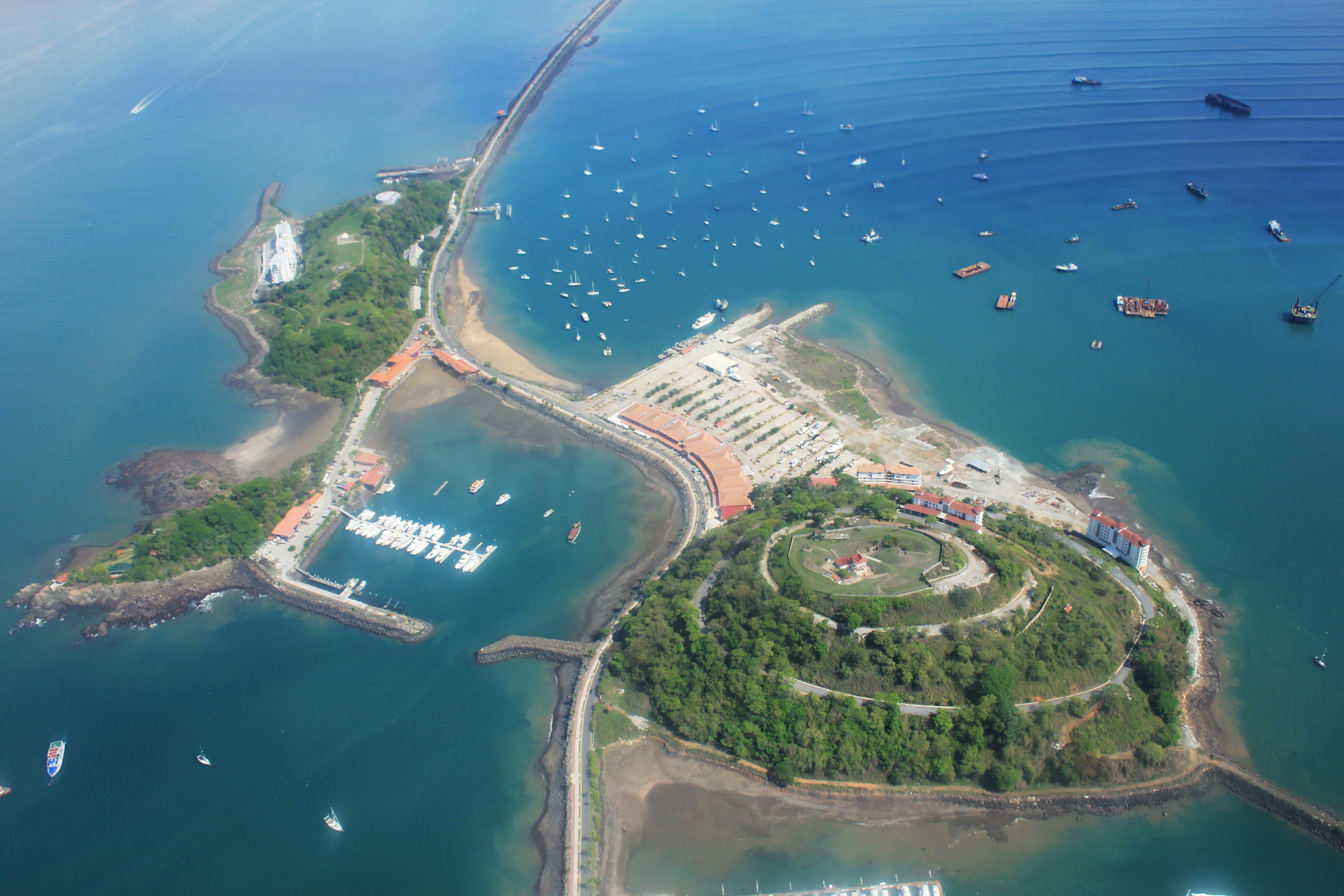
Naos Island (left) and Perico Island (right)

During World War II, fortifications were constructed on the islands to protect the canal but were never used. They have since been dismantled, but bulwarks and empty gun emplacements still exist.

Launch facilities are used by pilots boarding ships entering the Panama Canal from these islands.

Manuel Noriega built a private house on one of the islands, which was destroyed and looted during his ouster.

Since control of the islands reverted to Panama (they had previously been part of the Canal Zone), there has been considerable development along the causeway and edges of the islands, including port facilities, marinas, shopping, and restaurants. Away from their perimeters, the hilly islands still contain isolated maritime jungle, though they are threatened by continued development.
