= Atlapa Convention Centre =

Convention centre in Panama City, Panama

Coordinates: 8.989637499456245°N 79.5000187161862°W

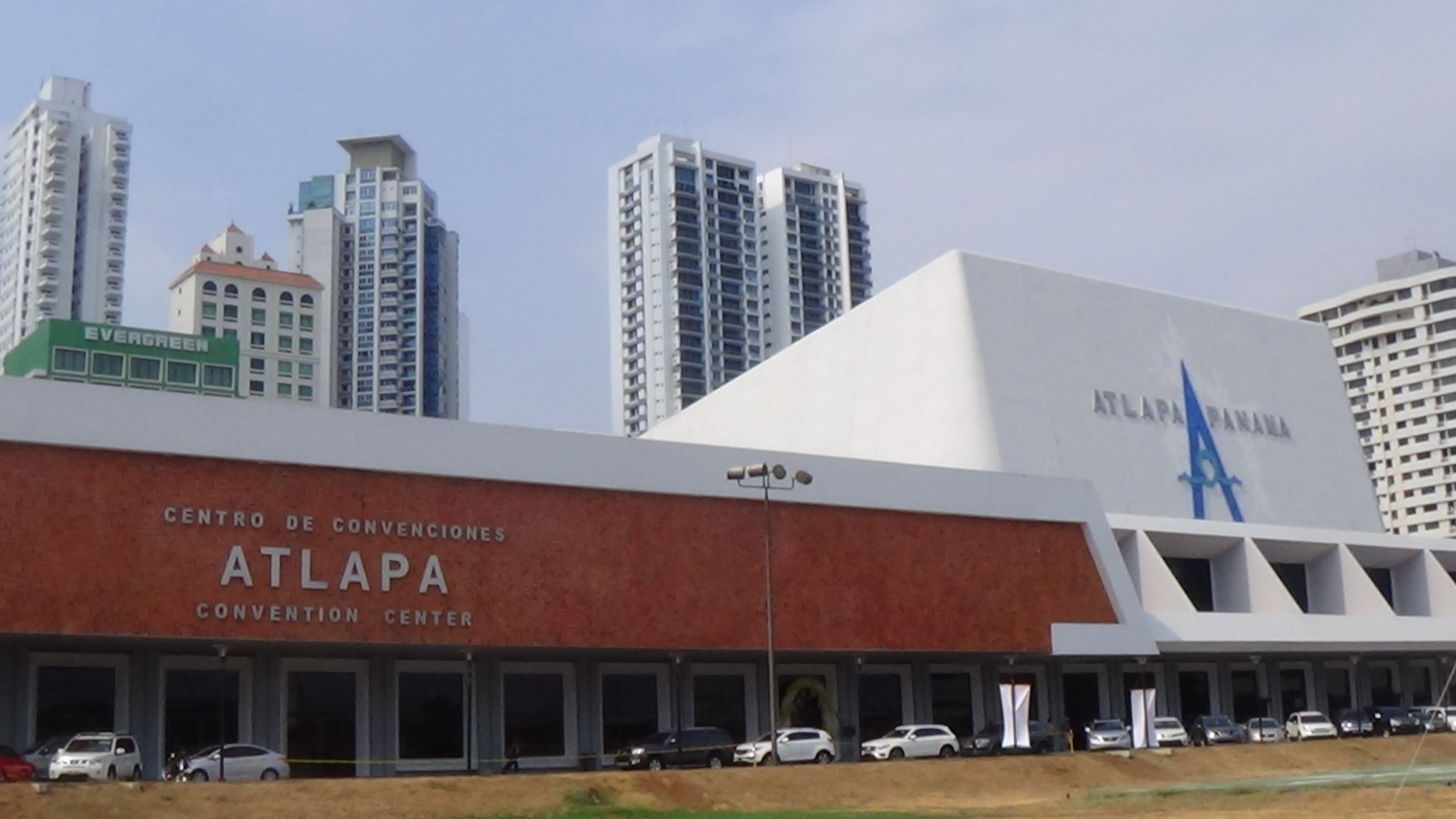
Atlapa Convention Centre, Panama City, Panama

Atlapa Convention Centre (Spanish: Centro de Convenciones de Atlapa) is located in Panama City, Panama. The convention centre was opened in June 1980. Run by the Panamanian tourist authority, it contains 19 meeting rooms, some of which are capable of hosting up to 600 people.

== Events ==
Since 1980, Panama's national craft fair has been held in Atlapa. The centre has also hosted trade fairs, tourism and business expos, concerts by international artists such as Ricky Martin, Yanni and Laura Pausini, and Beauty pageants such as Señorita Panamá. and Miss Universe 1986.

Atlapa has also functioned as a sports venue, hosting international boxing and the 2006 Men's Central American and Caribbean Basketball Championship.

It hosted news conferences by Panama's military dictator Manuel Noriega. Following the disputed 1989 Panamanian election, opposition candidates were blocked from addressing crowds at Atlapa and protestors attempted to disrupt the wedding of Noriega's daughter in the venue.

In September 2004, Martín Torrijos was invested as the 35th President of Panama in Atlapa's Anayansi theatre.

In July 2019, Laurentino Cortizo was invested as the 38th President of Panama in Atlapa's Anayansi theatre.

In March 2018, Atlapa hosted the Harvard World Model United Nations Conference, in collaboration with Universidad Santa Maria De Antigua which hosted over 1,600 students from all around the globe.

== Attempted sale and replacement ==
In 2008, following concerns that the centre lacked the necessary capacity and infrastructure, the Panamanian government decided to auction off the centre at the end of that year to fund the construction of a replacement convention centre. At this time, the centre was hosting events 360 days a year but still made annual losses of US$1 million. The auction was delayed by the Ministry of Housing. After initially requesting US$150 million, the government reduced the price to US$124.6 million, including the nearby land. When this failed to attract offers, the centre was offered for sale at US$62.3 million, under the terms of a 2006 Panamanian law. This price proved controversial with business groups, who believed the centre should remain state-owned. In April 2015, the government halted the sale. The lack of offers and the investment of US$3.2 million in preparation for the Summit of the Americas were cited as reasons.

== Summit of the Americas ==
In April 2015, the centre hosted the 7th Summit of the Americas during which President of the United States Barack Obama and President of Cuba Raúl Castro met and shook hands, a move that was described as "historic" by the international press.

Preceded by James L. Knight Center Complex (United States) Miami, FL	Miss Universe venue 1986	Succeeded by HarbourFront Centre; Singapore
