= Señorita Panamá 2017 =

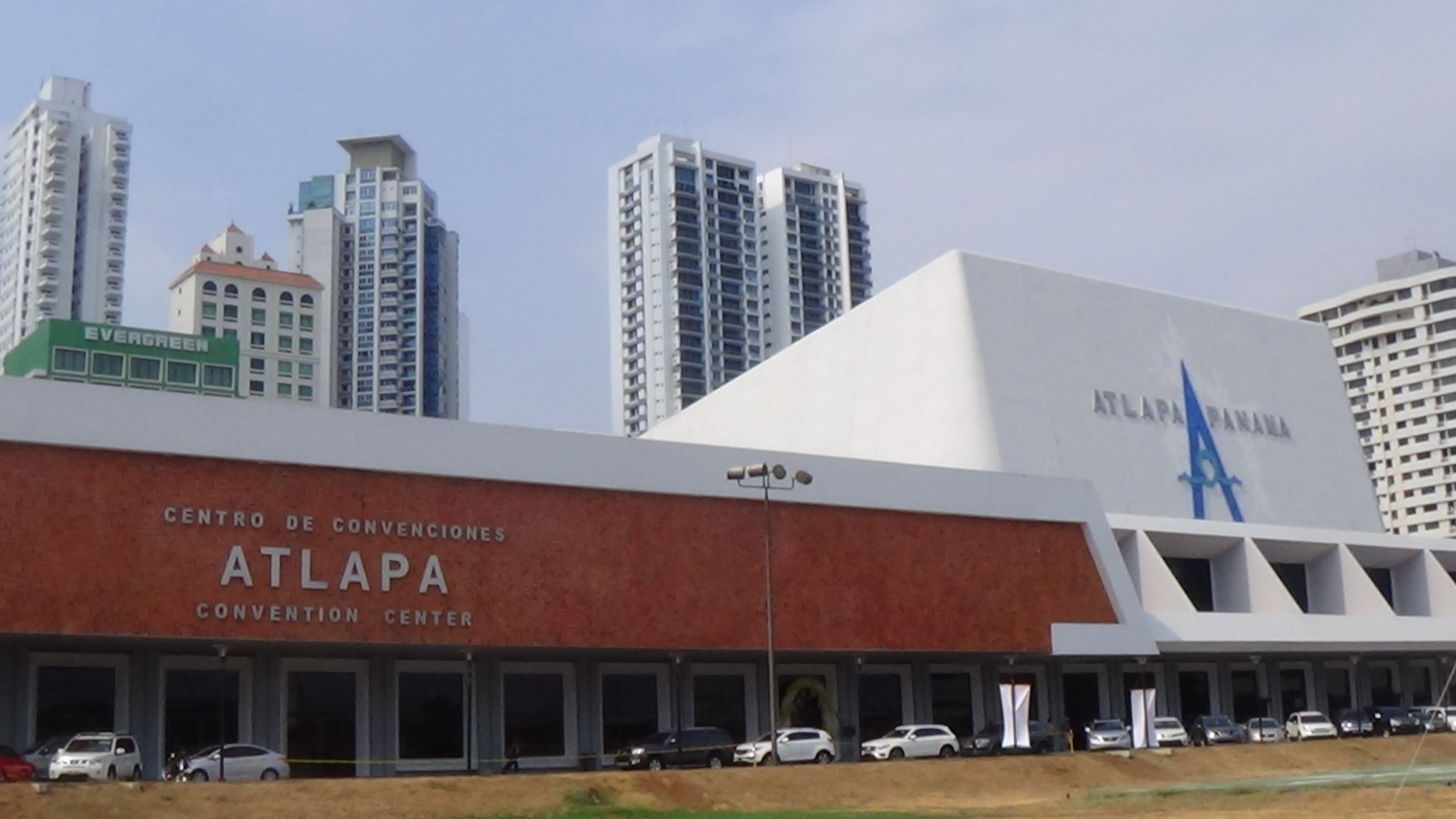
- Atlapa, venue of Señorita Panamá 2017
- Date: August 25, 2017
- Presenters: César Anel Rodríguez & Massiel Rodríguez
- Entertainment: Makano, Kiara y Kenny Pérez, Abdiel Núñez, Esthercita Nieto & Retz
- Venue: Atlapa Convention Centre, Panama City, Panama
- Broadcaster: RPC-TV
- Entrants: 18
- Placements: 10
- Winner: Laura de Sanctis; Contadora

Señorita Panamá 2017 the 51st Señorita Panamá pageant selecting delegates to Miss Universe and Miss World. The 2017 pageant was split into two contests, Señorita Panamá Mundo and Señorita Panamá. It was the second edition of the renewed Señorita Panama pageant, after Justine Pasek, Miss Universe 2002, and César Anel Rodríguez be named the new directors of the pageant in Panama. 20 preliminary contestants were selected from all over Panama and competed for the prestigious crown.

The event was held at the Atlapa Convention Centre, Panama City, Panama, August 25, 2017. Contestants from all over the country competed for the crown. Señorita Panamá 2016 Keity Drennan of Panama City crowned Laura de Sanctis of Contadora Island as her successor at the end of the event.

For the sixth consecutive time a competitor was named Señorita Panamá Mundo, who may not participate in the competition for Señorita Panamá Universe. Alessandra Bueno, Señorita Panamá World 2016, of Panama City crowned Julianne Brittón of Taboga Island as her successor at the end of the event.

Laura de Sanctis Señorita Panamá 2017 competed in Miss Universe 2017 on November 25, 2017. Julianne Brittón, Señorita Panamá World, represented Panama at the Miss World 2017 pageant held on December 2, 2017 at the Shenzhen Dayun Arena in Shenzhen, China; 'Erika Parker, Señorita Panamá Earth, represented Panama at Miss Earth 2017; and Darelys Santos represented Panama at Miss International 2017 in Tokyo on November 14, 2017.

== Final result ==
=== Placements ===
Placement	Contestant
Señorita Panamá 2017	Contadora – Laura de Sanctis
Señorita Panamá Earth 2017	Colón – Erika Parker
1st Runner-Up (Señorita Panamá International 2017)	Panamá Norte – Darelys Santos
2nd Runner-Up	Flamenco – Ana Cristina del Castillo
3rd Runner-Up	Coclé – Carolina Castillo
Top 10	Chiriquí Occidente – Luz Amanda Suñé Δ; Isla del Rey – Norma Angélica Díaz; Los Santos – Karol Dayana Batista; Panamá Este – Stéphany Guevara; Panamá Oeste – Paulette Sánchez

Δ People's Choice

=== Special awards ===
Award	Contestant
Miss Photogenic (Miss Fotogénica)	Stéphany Guevara (Panamá Este)
Miss Congeniality (Miss Amistad)	Norma Angélica Díaz (Isla del Rey)
Council of the Misses	Norma Angélica Díaz (Isla del Rey)
Best Editorial	Luz Amanda Suñé (Chiriquí Occidente)
Best Smile (Mejor Sonriza)	Ana Cristina del Castillo (Flamenco)
Best Skin (Mejor Piel)	Ana Cristina del Castillo (Flamenco)
Best Dress (Mejor Traje)	Paulette Sánchez (Panamá Oeste)
Best Hair (Mejor Cabellera)	Ana Cristina del Castillo (Flamenco)
Miss Integral	Laura de Sanctis (Contadora)
Best Body (Mejor Cuerpo)	María Ésther Toffolón (Comarcas)

== National costume selection ==
This year the contestant, was celebrated in a private casting. It is a competition showing the country's wealth embodied in the colorful and fascinating costumes made by Panamenian designers combining the past and present of Panama. The winner costume represent Panama in Miss Universe 2017 and the second place in Miss Earth 2017.

Final results	Contest	Designer	Topic
Winner	Best National Costume to Miss Universe	Samuel Alexis Bernal	"Panama national football team Allegory"
	Best National Costume to Miss Earth	Internal selection -	"Pollera Congo"

== Preliminary interview ==
Held on August 24, to Señorita Panamá candidates were qualified in personal interview.

== Judges ==
- Rossana Uribe: Stellar figure of the golden age of Miss Panama. (Panama)
- César Mercado: Representative for Latin America at the New York Film Academy (Mexico)
- Javier Gomez: Panamanian photographer based in New York. (Panama)
- Sheldry Sáez: Miss Panamá 2011. (Panama)
- José Gil: International Cultural Manager. (Chile)
- George Wittels: Goldsmith International. (Austria / Venezuela)
- Rafael Arrocha: Publicist. (Panama)
- María Fernanda Robaina: Journalist. (Panama)
- Aristides Burgos: Folklorist (Panama)
- Alena Wohlwend: Cosmeatra. (Switzerland)
- José Tejera: Doctor of Medicine. Psychiatrist. (Panama)

== Señorita Panamá World ==
Señorita Panamá World 2017
- Date: July 4, 2017.
- Presenters: Marco Oses & Lourdes González
- Entertainment: Aurelio Tamayo & Leo Almengor
- Venue: Atlapa Convention Centre, Panama City, Panama
- Broadcaster: Instagram Live
- Entrants: 20
- Placements: 10
- Winner: Julianne Brittón; Taboga

The Señorita World Panamá pageant was held at the Atlapa Convention Centre, Panama City, Panama, on July 4, 2017. About 20 contestants from all over Panama competed for the prestigious title. This year by decision of the international Miss World Organization, the election of the new global sovereign was held in a separate competition to the traditional national election. Alessandra Bueno Señorita Panamá Mundo 2016 crowned her successor as the new Señorita World Panamá.

=== Placements ===
Final results	Contestant
Señorita World Panamá 2017	Taboga - Julianne Brittón
1st runner-up	Colón - Erika Parker
2nd runner-up	Los Santos - Karol Dayana Batista
3rd runner-up	Flamenco - Ana Cristina del Castillo
4th runner-up	Contadora - Laura de Sanctis
Top 10 Semi-Finalist	Chiriquí Occidente - Luz Amanda Suñé Δ; Coclé - Carolina Castillo; Panamá Centro - María Alejandra Tejada; Panamá Oeste - Paulette Sánchez; Panamá Norte - Darelys Santos

Δ People's Choice

=== Special awards ===
Award	Contestant
Beauty with a Purpose	Taboga - Julianne Brittón
Best Dress	Panamá Norte - Darelys Santos

== Preliminary interview ==
Held on July 2, to Señorita Panamá World candidates were qualified in personal interview.

== Judges ==
- Lorelay de la Ossa de Vidal - Miss Panamá World 1979
- Melissa Piedrahita - Señorita Panamá World 2003
- Giselle Bissot - Señorita Panamá World 2006
- Gloria Stella Quintana - Señorita Panamá World 1989.
- Maria Jota Lovera - Businesswoman.
- Rogelio Campo - Businessman and owned of Frecuencias Asociadas.
- Massiel Rodriguez - Journalist and TV news presenter.
- Javier Zambrano - Industrial Engineer.
- Maylin Almeida - Director of Communications in Panama of Polytech.

== Official contestants ==
These are the competitors who have been selected this year.

Represent	Contestant	Age	Height	Hometown
Barro Colorado	Évelyn Hernández	24	1.79 m (5 ft 10 1/2 in)	Panama City
Bocas del Toro	Matilde Acevedo	25	1.76 m (5 ft 9 1/4 in)	Chitré
Chiriquí	Márgareth Villanueva	23	1.76 m (5 ft 9 1/4 in)	David
Chiriquí Occidente	Luz Amanda Suñé	19	1.73 m (5 ft 8 in)	Puerto Armuelles
Coclé	Carolina Castillo	24	1.75 m (5 ft 9 in)	Penonome
Colón	Erika Enith Parker	23	1.80 m (5 ft 10 3/4 in)	Colón
Comarcas	María Ésther Toffolón	24	1.78 m (5 ft 10 in)	Panama City
Contadora	Laura de Sanctis	20	1.82 m (5 ft 11 1/2 in)	Panama City
Darién	Lorraine Acevedo	26	1.74 m (5 ft 8 1/2 in)	Panama City
Flamenco	Ana Cristina del Castillo	19	1.78 m (5 ft 10 in)	Panama City
Herrera	Leidys Murillo	28	1.83 m (6 ft 0 in)	Chitré
Isla del Rey	Norma Angélica Díaz	22	1.79 m (5 ft 10 1/2 in)	Pedasí
Isla San José	Alexia Rivera	24	1.76 m (5 ft 9 1/4 in)	La Chorrera
Los Santos	Karol Dayana Batista	25	1.76 m (5 ft 9 1/4 in)	Pedasí
Panamá Centro	María Alejandra Tejada	25	1.78 m (5 ft 10 in)	Panama City
Panamá Este	Stéphany Guevara	27	1.75 m (5 ft 9 in)	Panama City
Panamá Norte	Darelys Santos	22	1.86 m (6 ft 1 1/4 in)	Panama City
Panamá Oeste	Paulette Sánchez	20	1.80 m (5 ft 10 3/4 in)	La Chorrera
Taboga	Julianne Brittón	21	1.85 m (6 ft 3/4 in)	Panama City
Veraguas	Suzeth Navarro	22	1.74 m (5 ft 8 1/2 in)	Santiago de Veraguas

== Historical significance ==
- Contadora win the Señorita Panamá title for first time.
- Colon win the Señorita Panamá Earth title for first time.
- Taboga win the Señorita Panamá World title for first time.
- Coclé, Los Santos, Colon place again in the final top after two year (2015)
- Panamá Oeste place for last time in (2014)
- Panamá Este place for last time in (2013)
- Chiriquí Occidente place for last time in (2009)
- Contadora, Flamenco, Panama Norte, Isla del Rey place for first time.

== Election schedule ==
Señorita Panamá World & Señorita Panamá 2017

- Thursday May 31 presentation Show
- Thursday July 4 competition to select the Señorita Panamá World winner
- Thursday August 25 Final night, coronation Señorita Panamá 2017

== Candidates notes ==
- Margareth Villanueva and Laura Sofia De Sanctis participated in Señorita Panamá 2016 where both are 2nd runner-up and 1st runner-up respectively.
- María Alejandra Tejada participated in the Miss Panamá 2013 representing Chiriquí.
- Julianne Britton is the cousin of Keity Drennan (Señorita Panamá 2016).
- Karol Dayana Batista competed in Miss Supranational 2017.
