= Miss Panamá 2013 =

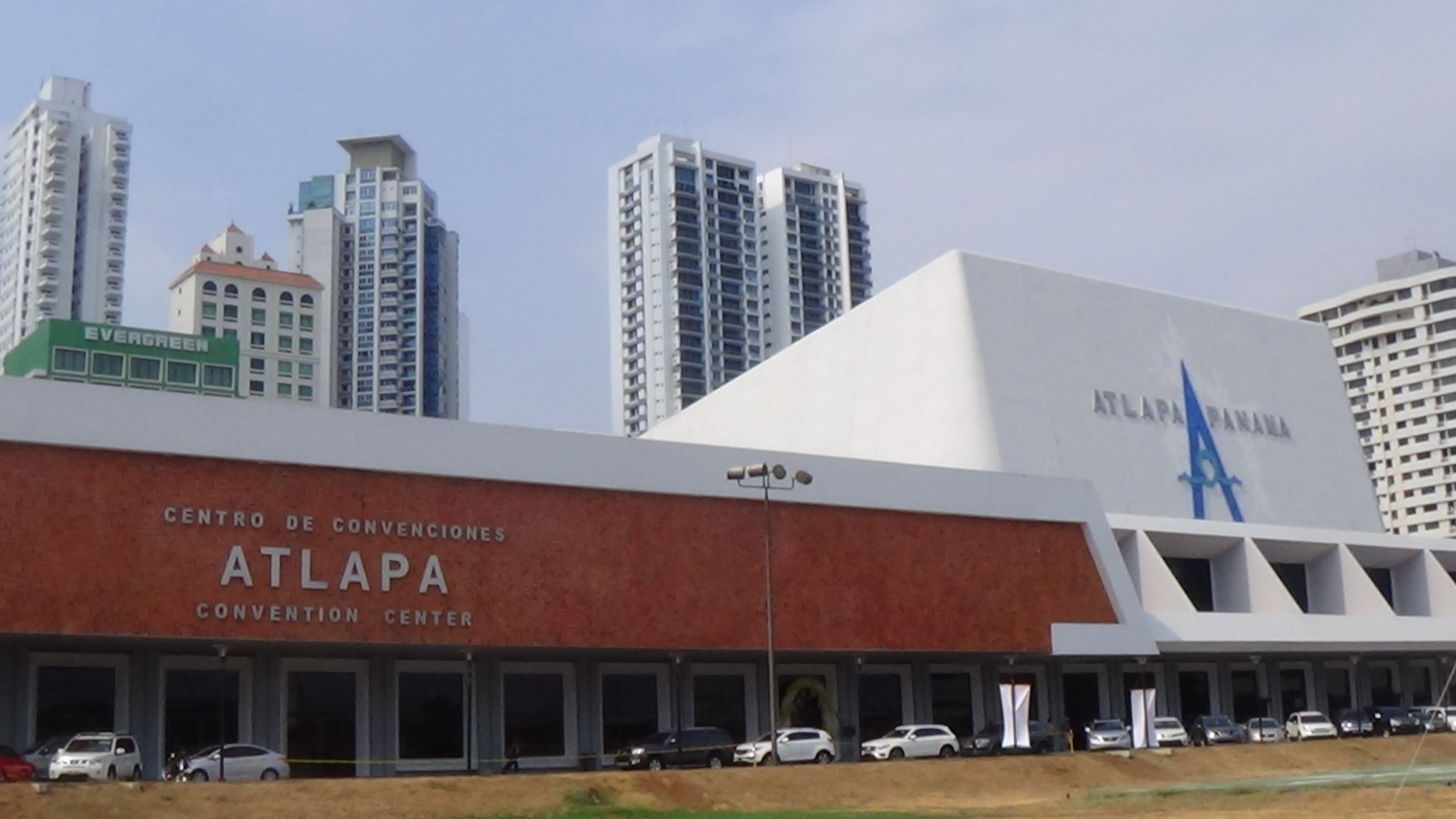
- Atlapa, venue of Miss Panamá 2013
- Date: April 30, 2013.
- Presenters: Glauber Barceló, Marisela Moreno and Madelaine Leignadier Dawson
- Entertainment: Erika Ender & Joey Montana
- Venue: Atlapa Convention Centre, Panama City, Panama
- Broadcaster: Telemetro
- Entrants: 13
- Placements: 6
- Winner: Carolina Brid; Veraguas

Miss Panamá 2013, the 47th annual Miss Panamá pageant, was held at the Atlapa Convention Centre, Panama City, Panama, on Tuesday, 30 April 2013.

Miss Panamá 2012, Stephanie Vander Werf of Panamá Centro crowned to Carolina Brid of Veraguas at the end of the event as the new Miss Panamá Universe, also Astrid Caballero Miss Intercontinental Panamá 2012 of Veraguas crowned to Sara Bello of Los Santos as the new Miss Intercontinental Panamá.

This year there was a new change after three years, returned the final competition entitled "Miss Panamá World" where announced the winner of the Miss Panamá Mundo title. Maricely González Miss Panamá World 2012 of Bocas del Toro crowned Virginia Hernández of Panamá Centro as the new Miss Panamá World at the end of the event. The winner cannot participate in the competition for Miss Panama Universe.

Carolina Brid, Miss Panamá Universe represented Panama in Miss Universe 2013 held in Moscow, Russia on November 9, 2013. Virginia Hernández, Miss Panamá World on the other hand represented the country in Miss World 2013 held in Jakarta, Indonesia on September 28, 2013. Sara Bello, Miss Panamá Intercontinental represented the country in Miss Intercontinental 2013 in November 2013.

== Result ==
=== Placements ===
Placement	Contestant
Miss Panamá 2013	Veraguas – Carolina Brid
Miss Panamá Intercontinental	Los Santos – Sara Bello Herrera
Miss Panamá Continente Américano	Panamá Centro – María Gabrielle Sealy
1st Runner-Up	Panamá Este – Melanie Ruiz
2nd Runner-Up	Comarcas – Janitzel Ferrera Pérez
3rd runner-up	Colón – Zumay Elena Antonios

=== Special awards ===
Award	Contestant
Miss Photogenic (Miss Fotogénica)	Anaís Herrera (Chiriquí Occidente)
Miss Congeniality (Miss Amistad)	María Alejandra Tejada (Chiriqui)
Miss Education (Miss Educacion)	Jeniffer Angélica Brown(Bocas del Toro)
Miss Fitness (Mejor Silueta)	María Alejandra Tejada (Chiriqui)
Best Runway (Mejor Pasarela)	María Alejandra Tejada (Chiriqui)
Miss Social Network Claro (Miss Redes Sociales Claro)	María Gabrielle Sealy (Panama Centro)
Best Hair (Mejor Cabellera)	Sara Bello (Los Santos)
Best Body (Mejor Cuerpo)	Janitzel Ferrara (Comarcas)
Best Face (Mejor Rostro Flormar)	Julieth Sánchez (Herrera)
Best Eyes (Mejor Vista expresiva)	Anaís Herrera (Chiriqui Occidente)

== National Costume Competition ==
This year the contestant, was celebrated in a private casting. It is a competition showing the country's wealth embodied in the colorful and fascinating costumes made by Panamenian designers combining the past and present of Panama. The winner costume represent Panamá in Miss Universe 2013.

Final results	Contest	Designer	Topic
Winner	Best National Costume to Miss Universe	Cesar D'Castro	"Capira"
1st runner-up		Cesar D'Castro	"India Anayansi"
2nd runner-up		Cesar D'Castro	"Incidente de la Tajada de Sandia"

== Preliminary Interview ==
Held on Monday April 29 to Miss Panama candidates were qualified in swimsuit and personal interview.

== Judges ==
- Rosario Grajales
- Alvaro Alvarado - Journalist and TV news presenter.
- Ana Gabriela Strathaman
- Rolando Espino - Specialist in Beauty pageants
- Muriel Rens - 1st runner up Miss International 1987.
- Stefanie de Roux - TV presenter and Miss Panama 2002.
- Luis Camnitzer - Conceptual artist who creates work in a variety of media.
- Irene Esser - Miss Venezuela 2011.
- Hector Alfonzo
- Ericka Nota

== Official Contestants ==
These are the competitors who have been selected this year.

Represents	Contestant	Age	Height	Hometown
Bocas del Toro	Jeniffer Angélica Brown	25	1.71 m (5 ft 7 1/4 in)	Colón
Chiriquí	María Alejandra Tejada Guerrero	20	1.79 m (5 ft 10 1/2 in)	Panama City
Chiriquí Occidente	Anaís Herrera	20	1.78 m (5 ft 10 in)	Panama City
Coclé	Claudia Cristina De León	20	1.76 m (5 ft 9 1/4 in)	Penonomé
Colón	Zumay Elena Antonios	23	1.78 m (5 ft 10 in)	Colón
Darién	Manuvis Mina Muñoz	18	1.75 m (5 ft 9 in)	Panama City
Comarcas	Janitzel Ferrera Pérez	22	1.84 m (6 ft 1/2 in)	Colón
Herrera	Julieth Sánchez	22	1.70 m (5 ft 7 in)	Chitre
Los Santos	Sara del Carmen Bello Herrera	25	1.66 m (5 ft 5 1/4 in)	Las Tablas
Panamá Centro	María Gabrielle Sealy	20	1.71 m (5 ft 7 1/4 in)	Penonomé
Panamá Este	Melanie Marie Ruíz	19	1.79 m (5 ft 10 1/2 in)	Panama City
Panamá Oeste	Catherine Michell Pino	20	1.67 m (5 ft 5 3/4 in)	Colón
Veraguas	Carolina Del Carmen Brid Cerrud	22	1.83 m (6 ft 0 in)	Panama City

=== Presentation Show ===
This Preliminary Competition also called The Runway and the Council of the Misses was celebrated on 4 March 2013, is the night when the third finalists were selected from Miss Panama 2012. A jury panel, together with the advice of the misses, selected the finalists based on the outputs of the girls during the event in the Swimsuit and cocktail dress categories.

== Historical significance ==
- Panamá Centro & Veraguas placed again in the final round for consecutive year.
- Veraguas has placed in the final round for four consecutive years.
- Veraguas won the Miss Panama title for four time, last time 2010 with Anyolí Ábrego.
- Comarcas was the first representation from her region and placed in the top 6.
- Colón returned to make the cut to the finals after several years.
- Los Santos won Miss Intercontinental Panamá title for first time.

== Preliminary Contestants ==
Contestants who were part of the top 19, eliminated in the preliminary meeting on March 4, 2013, are in color.

Contestant	Age	Height	Hometown
Nayara Noely Garcia Cuellar	22	1.66 m (5 ft 5 1/4 in)	Panama City
Melanie Marie Ruíz	19	1.79 m (5 ft 10 1/2 in)	Panama City
Arianny Gisell Chávez	24	1.70 m (5 ft 7 in)	Colón
Manuvis Mina Muñoz	18	1.73 m (5 ft 8 in)	Panama City
Jeniffer Angelica Brown	25	1.71 m (5 ft 7 1/4 in)	Colón
Sara del Carmen Bello Herrera	25	1.66 m (5 ft 5 1/4 in)	Los Santos
Catherine Michell Pino	20	1.67 m (5 ft 5 3/4 in)	Colón
María Alejandra Tejada Guerrero	20	1.79 m (5 ft 10 1/2 in)	Panama City
Maria Gabrielle Sealy	20	1.71 m (5 ft 7 1/4 in)	Coclé
Julieth Sanchez	22	1.74 m (5 ft 8 1/2 in)	Herrera
Claudia Cristina De León	20	1.76 m (5 ft 9 1/4 in)	Coclé
Zumay Elena Antonios	23	1.78 m (5 ft 10 in)	Colón
Carolina Del Carmen Brid Cerrud	22	1.83 m (6 ft 0 in)	Panama City
Anaís Herrera	20	1.78 m (5 ft 10 in)	Panama City
Madelen Liseth Batista	19	1.75 m (5 ft 9 in)	Panama City
Nicole Barroso	19	1.68 m (5 ft 6 1/4 in)	Panama City
Janitzel Ferrera Pérez	22	1.84 m (6 ft 1/2 in)	Colón
Iris Joana Saldaña	25	1.67 m (5 ft 5 3/4 in)	Panama City
Yatzury González	23	1.75 m (5 ft 9 in)	Panama City

== Miss Panamá World ==
The Miss Panamá Mundo pageant was held at the Atlapa Convention Center, Panama City, on January 8, 2012. About 10 contestants from all over Panama will compete for the prestigious title. This year by decision of the international Miss World Organization, the election of the new global sovereign will be held in a separate competition to the traditional national election. Maricely González Miss Panamá World 2012 crowned her successor at the end of the event. Also the winner is the new queen of the carnival of the city 2013.

== Final results ==
=== Placements ===
Placement	Contestant
Miss Panamá World 2013	Panamá Centro – Virginia Hernández
1st Runner-Up	Los Santos – Andrea Quintero (resigned)
2nd Runner-Up	Coclé – Nabil González
3rd Runner-Up	Chiriquí – Rocío Lezcano
4th Runner-Up	Panamá Centro – Caroline Garzón

== Official Contestants ==
These are the competitors who have been selected this year for the Miss Panama World.

Represents	Contestant	Age	Height	Hometown
Chiriquí	Rocío Lezcano	20	1.75 m (5 ft 9 in)	David
Coclé	Nabil González Lozano	22	1.74 m (5 ft 8 1/2 in)	Penonomé
Panamá Centro	Caroline Garzón	19	1.74 m (5 ft 8 1/2 in)	Panama City
Panamá Centro	Yorkibel Marín Quintero	21	0.0 m (0 in)	Panama City
Herrera	Yulieth Sánchez	22	1.74 m (5 ft 8 1/2 in)	Herrera
Panamá Centro	Krizia Pérez	25	1.70 m (5 ft 7 in)	Panama City
Los Santos	Andrea Alejandra Quintero Garcia	23	1.74 m (5 ft 8 1/2 in)	Las Tablas
Panamá Centro	Virginia Isabel Hernández Milachay	22	1.73 m (5 ft 8 in)	Panama City
Panamá Centro	Manuvis Muñoz	19	1.73 m (5 ft 8 in)	Panama City
Panamá Centro	Nayanara García	22	1.66 m (5 ft 5 1/4 in)	Panama City

=== Special awards ===
Award	Contestant
Miss Congeniality (Miss Amistad)	Virginia Hernández (Panamá Centro)

== Judges ==
- Enrique Hoo
- Anyolí Ábrego: Model and Miss Panamá 2010.
- Monica Aguilera
- José Agustín Espino: plastic surgeon Organization official Miss Panama.
- Sorangel Matos: Internacional Model, Ex Carnival Queen and Miss Panamá 2007

== Election schedule ==
(Miss Panamá World 2013)

- Thursday January 3 presentation Show.
- Monday January 7 interview with the juror.
- Tuesday January 8 Final night, coronation Miss Panamá World 2013.

(Miss Panamá 2013)

- Monday March 4 presentation Show.
- March competition National Costume.
- April Final night, coronation Miss Panamá 2013.

== Candidates Notes ==
(Miss Panamá 2013)

- Carolina Del Carmen Brid Cerrud was Miss Tourism International Panamá 2011 and participate in the Miss Tourism International 2011 in Malaysia. She was 1st Runner-up (Miss Tourism Metropolitan International).
- Claudia De León 2010 Ellas Fotogenica and Chica Avon 2010, in the 2012 participate in Miss Panamá 2012 but did no place in the top 12 finalist.
- Arianny Chávez participate in the national pageant Bellezas Panamá 2010 where she was 1st Runner-up.
- Jeniffer Brown participate in the national pageant Miss Top Model Panama 2012
- Maria Gabrielle Sealy was Miss Teen America Panamá 2007 and Miss Teen Belleza Mundial 2007 also represent Panama in the Reinado Internacional del Joropo 2011, was 1st Runner-up in the Panama City Carnival 2011.
- Zumay Antonios participate in the national pageant Miss Turismo Panamá 2011.

(Miss Panamá World 2013)

- Nabil González was Miss Atlantic Panamá 2009 and participate in the Miss Atlántico Internacional 2009 in Montevideo, Uruguay, also participate in the Miss Panamá 2012 representing the Chiriquí Occidente region and represented Panama in the contest Reinado Internacional de la Ganadería 2012 in Colombia but did no place.
- Andrea Quintero was queen of Calle Arriba in the 2011 Las Tablas's Carnival also represent Panama in the contest Reinado Internacional de la Ganadería 2011 in Colombia but did no place.
- Carolina Garzón was Miss Top Model Panamá 2011-2012 (later dethroned).
- Yorkibel Marín was Miss Top Model Panamá 2011 and represent Panama in the Reinado Internacional del Pacífico 2012, won the Miss Congeniality.
- Virginia Hernández was Miss World University Panamá 2010 and represent her country in the Miss World University 2010 in South Korea where she won the Miss Congeniality.
