= Miss Panamá 2012 =

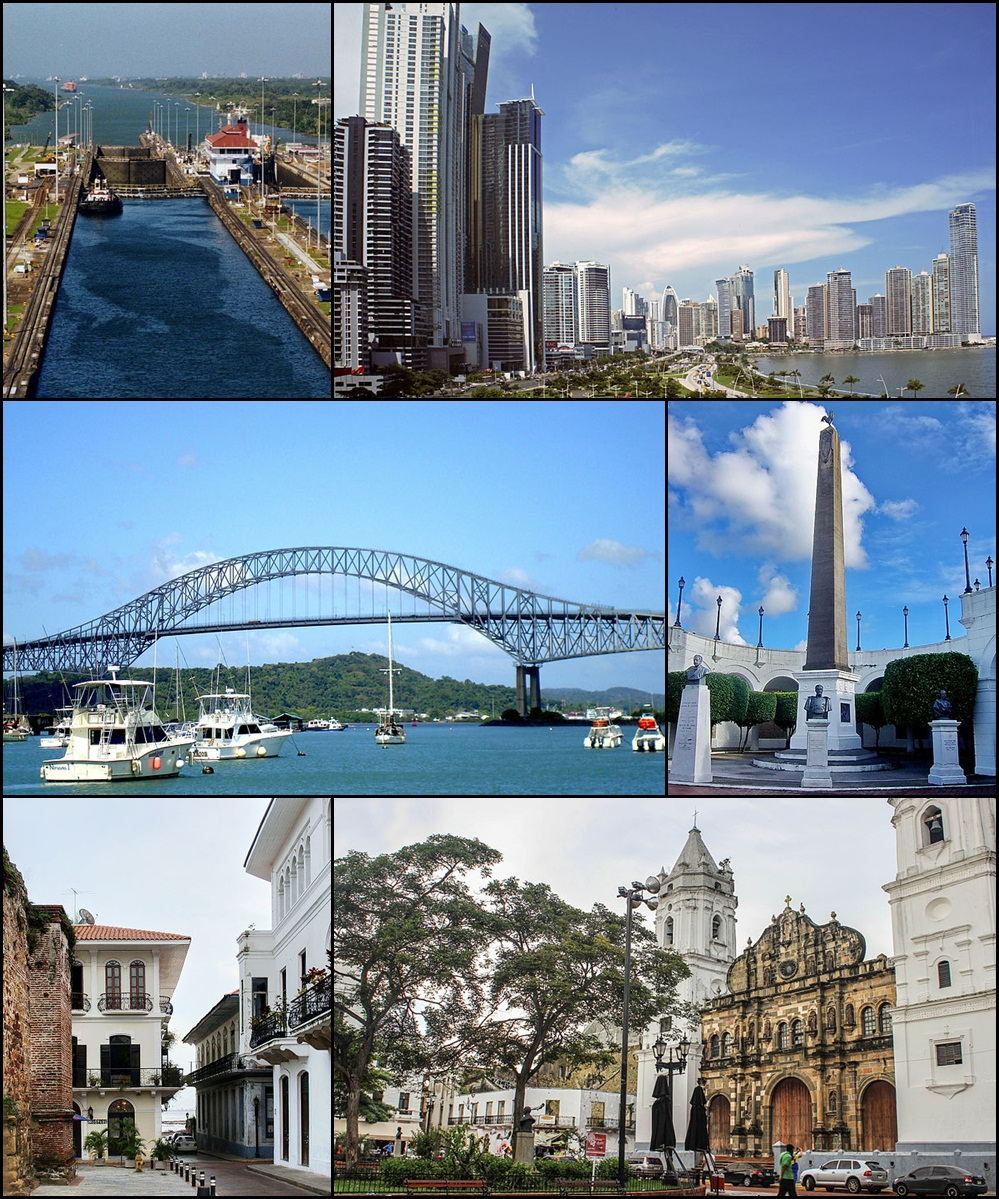
- Panama City host of Señorita Panamá 2012
- Date: March 30, 2012
- Presenters: Jorge Herrera; Ana Lucia Herrera; Stefanie de Roux
- Entertainment: Margarita Henriquez; Aldo Ranks; Sergio Vargas
- Venue: Riu Plaza Panamá Hotel, Ciudad de Panamá, Panama
- Broadcaster: Telemetro
- Entrants: 12
- Placements: 6
- Winner: Stephanie Vander Werf; Panamá Centro

Miss Panamá 2012 was the 46th Annual Miss Panamá pageant, held at the Riu Plaza Panamá Hotel in Ciudad de Panamá, Panama; on March 30, 2012.

It was broadcast live on Telemetro. About 12 contestants from all over Panamá competed for the prestigious crown. Miss Panamá 2011, Sheldry Sáez of Herrera and Irene Núñez of Veraguas crowned Stephanie Vander Werf of Panamá Centro and Maricely González of Bocas del Toro at the end of the event as the new Miss Panamá Universe and Miss Panamá World, respectively.

Stephanie Miss Panamá Universe represented Panama in the 61st Miss Universe 2012 pageant held on December 19, 2012 at the Theatre for the Performing Arts at the Planet Hollywood Resort & Casino in Las Vegas, Nevada, United States.

The contest also selected the Winner of the title Miss International Panamá, giving her the right to represent the country in Miss International 2012, which was to take place on October 21, 2012 in Okinawa, Japan and the Winner of the title Miss Earth Panamá, giving her the right to represent the country in Miss Earth 2012, which was scheduled to be held in Philippines in November 24, 2012.

== Result ==
=== Placements ===
Placement	Contestant
Miss Panamá 2012	Panamá Centro – Stephanie Vander Werf
Miss Panamá World 2012	Bocas del Toro – Maricely González
Miss Panamá Earth 2012	Coclé – Ana Lorena Ibáñez
Miss Panamá International 2012	Chiriquí – Karen Jordán
Top 6	Veraguas – Astrid Caballero; Herrera – Yinela Yero

=== Presentation Show ===
This Preliminary Competition also called The Runway and the Council of the Misses was celebrated on 6 February 2012, is the night when the twelve finalists were selected from Miss Panama 2012. A jury panel, together with the advice of the misses, eleven of the selected finalists based on the outputs of the girls during the event in the Swimsuit and cocktail dress categories. The candidate number 12, will be selected through the votes of those attending the Gala by one count, once the show.

=== Special awards ===
Award	Contestant
Miss Photogenic (Miss Fotogénica)	Maricely González (Bocas del Toro)
Miss Congeniality (Miss Amistad)	Heidy Choy (Panamá Este)
Miss Eloquence (Miss Elocuencia)	Stephanie Vander Werf (Panama Centro)
Best Body Power Club (Mejor Cuerpo)	Karen Jordán (Chiriqui)

== National Costume Competition ==
On 5 March 2012, was celebrated the National Costume contestant called Descubre Tu Interior. In this competition the contestants are not evaluated, only the costumes. It is a competition showing the country's wealth embodied in the colorful and fascinating costumes made by Panamanian designers combining the past and present of Panama. The winner costume represent Panamá in Miss Universe 2012.

Final results	Contest	Designer	Topic	Contestant
Winner	Best National Costume to Miss Universe	Cesar D'Castro	"Diosa da Bahide"	Maricely González
1st runner-up		Daniel Cortina	"Altar de Oro"	Nabil González
2nd runner-up		Edgar Bedoya	"Panama Precolombina"	Yinela Yero

- Bocas del Toro - "Diosa da Bahide" (Will compete in Miss Universe 2012)
- Chiriquí Occidente - "El Altar de Oro"
- Chiriquí - "Panamá la Vieja"
- Panamá Oeste - "El Chaman"
- Panamá Este - "El espitíru del Darién"
- Colón - "Las Joyas de la Pollera "El Joyero"

- Coclé - "Un Tesoro por Descubrir"
- Darién - "Atelopus Zeteki"
- Herrera - "Panamá Precolombina"
- Panamá Centro - "La Guacamaya"
- Veraguas - "Awena Protectora de Los Mares"
- Los Santos - "Las Voces de Cubita"

== Preliminary Interview ==
Held on Thursday March 29 to Miss Panama candidates were qualified in swimsuit and personal interview.

== Judges ==
- Gustavo Alvarez: General Manager, Peugeot Panama.
- Anabel Quintero: Ecuadorean, a Fashion Designer
- Reina Royo Rivera: Miss Panama for Miss Universe 1995.
- Carlos Mastellari, Director of the Pompa Group
- Oscar Borda Colombia. General Manager, Claro Panama
- Tania Hyman: Cheerleader, actress and owner of Tania Models.
- Marcel Andrew Chang: Director of Sales, RIU Plaza Panama
- Alejandro Rada Cassab: Colombian. Medical Doctor, Rada Cassab founder of Aesthetic Medicine
- Ximena Navarrete Rosete: Mexican Miss Universe 2010
- Katty Pulido: Venezuelan. Katty Pulido Director of International Academy recognized modeling
- Gabriel Ramos: Venezuelan. Entrepreneur with experience in beauty pageants.

== Official contestants ==
These are the competitors who have been selected this year.

Represents	Contestant	Age	Height	Hometown
Bocas del Toro	Maricely González	22	1.70 m (5 ft 7 in)	Ciudad de Panamá
Chiriquí	Karen Jordán	23	1.73 m (5 ft 8 in)	David
Chiriquí Occidente	Nabil González Lozano	22	1.67 m (5 ft 5 3/4 in)	Penonomé
Coclé	Ana Lorena Ibáñez	25	1.74 m (5 ft 8 1/2 in)	Penonomé
Colón	Natalia Tamayo Dominici	24	1.73 m (5 ft 8 in)	Ciudad de Panamá
Darién	Michelle Madrid Dudley	18	1.74 m (5 ft 8 1/2 in)	Ciudad de Panamá
Herrera	Yinela Yohan Yero	21	1.79 m (5 ft 10 1/2 in)	Capira
Los Santos	Milagros Ramos Castro	24	1.66 m (5 ft 5 1/4 in)	Macaracas
Panamá Centro	Stephanie Vander Werf	25	1.76 m (5 ft 9 1/4 in)	Ciudad de Panamá
Panamá Este	Heidy Choy Barrera	21	1.69 m (5 ft 6 1/2 in)	Ciudad de Panamá
Panamá Oeste	Elissa Estrada	18	1.72 m (5 ft 7 3/4 in)	Arraiján
Veraguas	Astrid Caballero Santos	21	1.83 m (6 ft 0 in)	Ciudad de Panamá

== Historical significance ==
- Panamá Centro won Miss Panamá, last time in 2008 with Carolina Dementiev.
- Panamá Centro, Veraguas, Bocas del Toro & Herrera placed again in the final round for consecutive year.
- Chiriquí returned to make the cut to the finals after two years 2010.
- Coclé won Miss Earth Panamá title for first time.
- Chiriquí won Miss International Panamá title for second time, last time in 2009.

== Preliminary contestants ==
Contestants who were part of the top 20, eliminated in the preliminary meeting on February 6, 2012 are in color.

Contestant	Age	Height	Hometown
Maricely González Pomares	22	1.73 m (5 ft 8 in)	Ciudad de Panamá
Yinela Yohan Yero	21	1.80 m (5 ft 10 3/4 in)	Ciudad de Panamá
Nathalia Tamayo Dominici	24	1.75 m (5 ft 9 in)	Ciudad de Panamá
Nabil González Lozano	22	1.72 m (5 ft 7 3/4 in)	Ciudad de Panamá
Elissa Estrada	19	1.72 m (5 ft 7 3/4 in)	Ciudad de Panamá
Karen Elena Jordán Beitia	20	1.75 m (5 ft 9 in)	David
Astrid Caballero	21	1.82 m (5 ft 11 3/4 in)	Ciudad de Panamá
Carolina Angulo	21	1.70 m (5 ft 7 in)	Ciudad de Panamá
Darling Pinto	18	1.70 m (5 ft 7 in)	Darién
Claudia Elena De León	19	1.70 m (5 ft 7 in)	Coclé
Nereyda Moreno	21	1.70 m (5 ft 7 in)	Herrera
Milagros Guadalupe Ramos Castro	24	1.70 m (5 ft 7 in)	Los Santos
Dania María Vergara	27	1.77 m (5 ft 9 3/4 in)	Los Santos
Michelle Marie Dudley	18	1.70 m (5 ft 7 in)	Ciudad de Panamá
Melibeth Escurra	19	1.70 m (5 ft 7 in)	Ciudad de Panamá
Heidy Choy	20	1.70 m (5 ft 7 in)	Ciudad de Panamá
Ana Lorena Ibañez Carles	25	1.74 m (5 ft 8 1/2 in)	Coclé
Daniela Moreno	26	1.70 m (5 ft 7 in)	Ciudad de Panamá
Stephanie Vander Werf	25	1.78 m (5 ft 10 in)	Ciudad de Panamá
Milagros Abrego	21	1.70 m (5 ft 7 in)	Ciudad de Panamá

== Election schedule ==
- Monday February 6 presentation Show.
- Monday March 5 competition National Costume.
- Friday March 30 Final night, coronation Miss Panamá 2012.

== Candidates notes ==
- Maricely González Pomares was Miss Tourism International Panamá 2010 and participate in the Miss Tourism International 2010 in Malaysia. She was Semi-finalists (top 20).
- Yinela Yohan Yero was the Carnival Panamá City queen in 2011.
- Natalia Tamayo Dominici participate in Elite Model Look Panamá, Chico & Chica Modelo (modeling search), Reign Costa Maya International, Miss World Business in Colombia and the International Queen of Carnival in Ecuador.
- Nabil González was Miss Atlantic Panamá 2009 and participate in the Miss Atlántico Internacional 2009 in Montevideo, Uruguay.
- Elissa Estrada participate in the 2007 Miss Teen América Panamá where she was 1st runner and the Ford Super Model of the World in São Paulo, Brazil where she won.
- Karen Jordan participate in the national pageant Miss Mundo Panamá 2010, the International Queen of Coffee in Manizales, Colombia, the Chica Avon 2010, Miss Model of the World Panamá 2011 and Miss Asia Pacific 2011 in South Korea.
- Astrid Caballero participate in the Miss Teen América Panamá 2009 (second runner up), and later in the Miss Mundo Panamá 2010.
- Carolina Angulo in 2010 participate in Miss Tourism Queen Panamá 2010 and Chica Avon 2010.
- Claudia De León 2010 Ellas Fotogenica and Chica Avon 2010.
- Melibeth Escurra participate in the national pageant Miss Atlantic Panamá 2011.
- Heidy Choy was Reina China Panamá and won the World Miss University Panamá.
- Daniela Moreno was Miss Hawaiian Tropic Panamá and participate in Miss Hawaiian Tropic Internacional in Oahu Hawaii (top 10).
- Milagros Abrego participate in the Miss Mesoamérica Internacional 2011 in Guatemala.

== International participation ==
- Maricely González Pomares was quarter-finalist (Top 30) at Miss World 2012 and place Top 5 in Miss World Talent.
- Astrid Caballero was appointed as Miss Intercontinental Panama, so giving her the right to represent Panama in Miss Intercontinental 2012 in Aachen, Germany.

== Relationship with other contests ==
- Elissa Estrada was elected as Miss Supranational Panama by the Miss Supranational Panama Organization, she placed in the top 10 finalist and was elected as Miss Supranational Americas, contest held in Warsaw, Poland on September 14, 2012.
