= Sara Bello =

Miss Los Santos 2013

- Born: Sara Del Carmen Bello Herrera; 17 December 1987 (age 38); Las Tablas, Los Santos Province, Panama
- Height: 1.63 m (5 ft 4 in)
- Beauty pageant titleholder
- Title: Miss Panamá Intercontinental 2013
- Hair color: Black
- Eye color: Brown
- Major competitions: Miss Panamá Intercontinental 2013; Miss Intercontinental 2013 (Top 15) (Best National Costume)

Sara Del Carmen Bello Herrera (born 17 December 1987) is a Panamanian beauty pageant titleholder and winner of the Panamá Intercontinental 2013, April 2013 for Miss Intercontinental 2013, reina del carnaval internacional de Calle Abajo de Las Tablas 2007, Los Santos-Panamá.

== Queen of the Las Tablas carnival 2007 ==
Sara won her first beauty contest in early 2007 when she became queen of the Las Tablas carnival.

== Miss Panamá 2013 ==
Bello is 5 ft 1/2 in (1.66 m) tall, and competed in the national beauty pageant Miss Panamá 2013. She represented the state of Los Santos.

== Miss Intercontinental 2013 ==
She represented Panama at the Miss Intercontinental 2013 pageant in Germany in November 2013 where she placed in the Top 15 and won the National Costume.

== See also ==
- Carolina Brid
- Virginia Hernández

Awards and achievements
Preceded by Astrid Caballero	Miss Panamá Intercontinental; 2013–2014	Succeeded by Stephanie Gonzáles
Preceded by Milagros Ramos	Miss Los Santos; 2013-2014	Succeeded by Aileen Bernal
