= Irene Núñez =

Model

- Born: Irene Del Carmen Núñez Quintero; June 11, 1987 (age 39); Panama City, Panama
- Height: 1.75 m (5 ft 9 in)
- Beauty pageant titleholder
- Title: Miss Panamá World 2011
- Hair color: Brown
- Eye color: Green
- Major competitions: Miss Panamá 2011 (Miss World Panama), Miss World 2011 (Unplaced)

Irene Del Carmen Núñez Quintero (born June 11, 1987) is a Panamanian model and beauty pageant titleholder who won the Miss World Panama 2011 title.

== Pageant participations ==
In 2009, she won the Miss Tourism International Panamá 2009 and participated in the Miss Tourism International 2009 in Malaysia. She was Semi-finalists (top 10).

== Miss Panamá 2011 ==
Núñez, who stands 5 ft 9 in (1.75 m) tall, competed in the national beauty pageant Miss Panamá 2011, on May 26, 2011 and obtained the title of Miss Panamá World. She represented Veraguas state.

== Miss World 2011 ==
She represented Panama in the 61st Miss World 2011 pageant, held at London, United Kingdom on November 6, 2011 but did not place. She placed Top 24 at Miss World Sport and Top 36 at Miss World Beach Beauty

== See also ==
- Sheldry Sáez
- Keity Drennan

Awards and achievements
Preceded by Paola Vaprio	Miss World Panamá; 2011–2012	Succeeded by Maricely González
Preceded by Anyolí Ábrego	Miss Veraguas; 2011–2012	Succeeded by Astrid Caballero
