= Marelissa Him =

Panamanian model (born 1998)

Marelissa Him Betancourt
- Born: Marelissa Him Betancourt; July 2, 1989 (age 37); Panama City, Panama
- Height: 1.69 m (5 ft 7 in)
- Beauty pageant titleholder
- Title: Miss Earth Panamá 2011
- Hair color: Blonde
- Eye color: Brown
- Major competitions: Señorita Panamá 2010 (Unplace); Reina Hispanoamericana 2011 (Unplace); Miss Earth 2011 (Unplace)

Marelissa Him Betancourt (born July 2, 1998) is a Panamanian model, beauty pageant titleholder, and the winner of Miss Earth Panamá 2011.

== Señorita Panamá 2010 ==
She is 5 ft 7 in (1.67 m) tall, and competed in the national beauty pageant Señorita Panamá 2010, where she was an unplaced contest winner for Anyolí Ábrego who participated in the Miss Universe 2010 (who in turn failed to enter the semi-finals of Miss Universe 2010).

== Miss Earth 2011 ==
She represented Panama in the Miss Earth 2011 pageant.

== Reina Hispanoamericana 2011 ==
She represented Panama in the Reina Hispanoamericana 2011 pageant, held on October 27, 2011, in Santa Cruz, Bolivia.

Awards and achievements
Preceded by Nicole Morrell	Miss Earth Panamá; 2011	Succeeded by Ana Ibáñez
Preceded by Michelle Ostler	Reina Hispanoamericana Panamá; 2011	Succeeded by Ana Ibáñez
