= Miss Panamá 2016 =

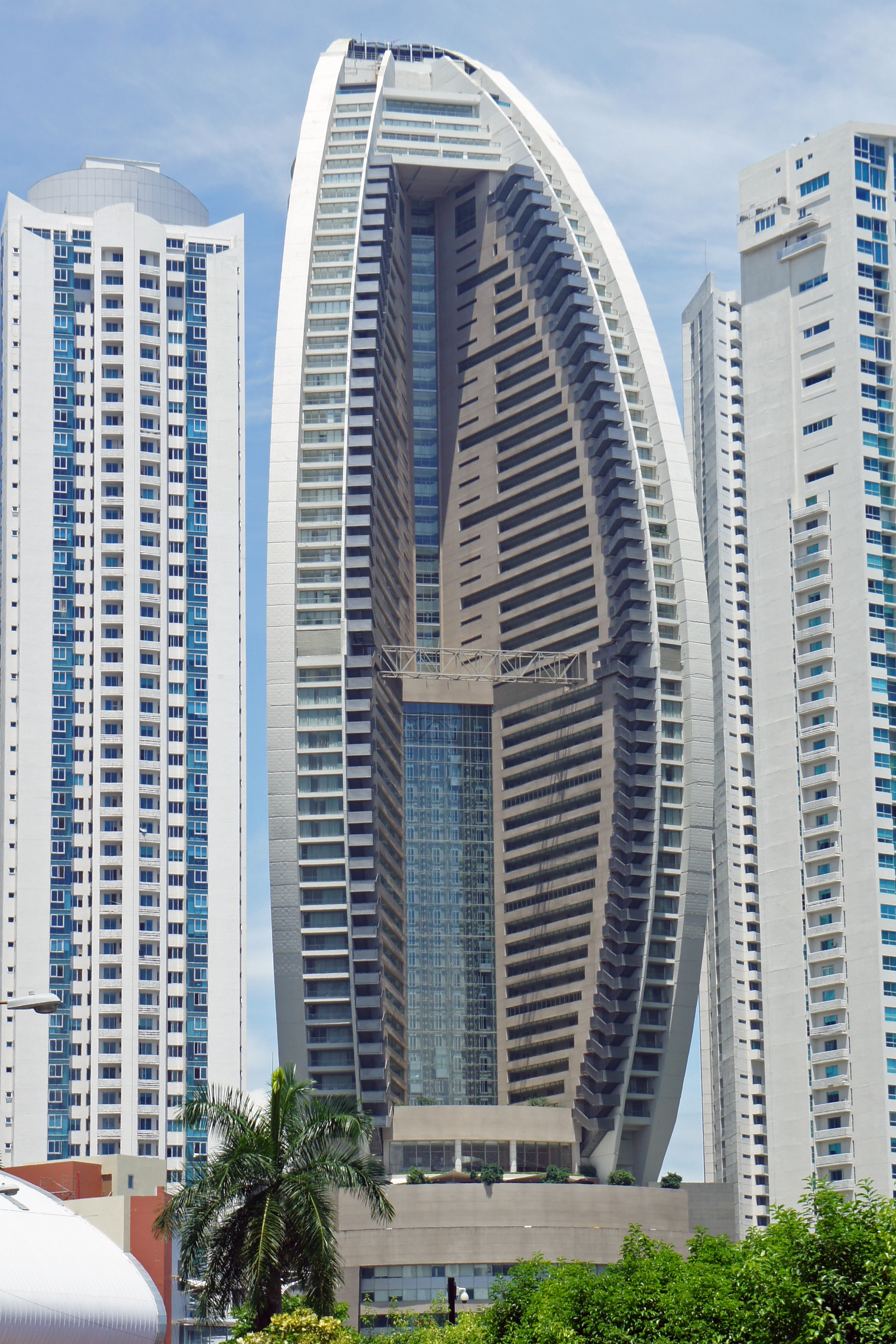
- JW Marriott Panama, then known as the Trump Ocean Club International Hotel and Tower
- Date: April 26, 2016
- Presenters: Carolina Fábrega
- Venue: Trump Ocean Club International Hotel and Tower, Ciudad de Panamá, Panama
- Broadcaster: Telemetro
- Entrants: 21
- Placements: 3
- Winner: Keity Drennan Mendieta; Panamá Centro

Señorita Panama 2016 (formerly Miss Panama) was the 50th Miss Panamá pageant, held to select Panama's representative to the Miss Universe and Miss World pageants. This was the first edition of the renewed Miss Panama pageant, after Justine Pasek, Miss Universe 2002, and César Anel Rodríguez had been named the new directors of the pageant.

Twenty preliminary contestants were selected from all over Panama and competed for the crown. The winner of Señorita Panama 2016 was Keity Mendieta (Keity Drennan Mendieta Britton, born on July 24, 1990, in Panama City, Panamá). Miss Panamá 2015 Gladys Del Carmen Brandao Amaya of Los Santos crowned her successor at the end of the event. The event was held at the Trump Ocean Club International Hotel and Tower, Ciudad de Panamá, Panama, on May 26, 2016.

Keity Mendieta, Señorita Panama 2016, represented Panama at Miss Universe 2016 the 65th Miss Universe pageant, held on January 30, 2017, at the Mall of Asia Arena, Pasay, Metro Manila, Philippines, where Mendieta placed in the Top 13.

== Results ==
=== Placements ===
Placement	Contestant
Señorita Panama 2016	Panamá Centro – Keity Drennan Mendieta
1st Runner-Up	Panamá – Laura de Sanctis
2nd Runner-Up	Chiriquí – Margareth Villanueva

== Judges ==
- Michelle Zarak - Fashion designer
- Dario Moreno - Fashion photographer
- Analía Núñez - Señorita Panamá 1999
- Alberto Jaén - Interior decorator
- Miguel Caceres - Steps Gym representative
- Lucy Romero - Beautician
- Ed Dominguez - Owner of globalbeauties.com
- Paul Loo - Personal trainer

== Contestants ==
These are the candidates evaluated through a casting for this edition:

Contestant	Age
Julia Rodriguez	25
Virginia Nieto	24
Maria Esther Toffolon	23
Jenia Fulton	22
Olivia Pineda	20
Katherine Quintero	24
Maria Cristina Rodriguez	20
Ana María Jurado	22
Julianne Britton	20
Laura de Sanctis	19
Leydis González	18
Rita Silvestre	25
Margareth Villanueva	22
Mary Carmen Aguian	24
Amelia Rodríguez	24
Alba Cristina Ríos	25
Keity Drennan	25
Lorraine Acevedo	25
Angela Maltez	24
Stephany Guevara	26
Ingrid Suárez	19

== Preliminary interviews ==
On April 16, Señorita Panama candidates participated in qualifiers through a swimsuit contest and a personal interview.

== Gala Viva Panama ==
Held on September 1, the Gala Viva Panama was the election for the Best National Costume. In this competition, the contestants were not evaluated, only the costumes.

The event showcased the creative work of Panamanian designers and also selected the costume for Panama at Miss Universe 2016. Some costumes were also elected to represent Panama in other beauty contests.

The contest also led to the selection of Señorita Panamá World, Señorita Panamá Earth, Señorita Panamá Hispanoamerica and Señorita Panamá United Continents. Diana Jaén, Miss Panamá World 2015, crowned her successor, Alessandra Bueno Fontaine of Panamá Centro, as Señorita Panamá World 2016. Carmen Jaramillo of Panamá Oeste crowned Virginia Isabel Hernández Milachay of Panamá Centro as Señorita Panamá Earth 2016. Jhasmeiry Herrera Evans of Colón was crowned as Señorita Panamá Hispanoamerica 2016.

Alessandra Bueno Fontaine represented Panama in the 66th Miss World finals at the Gaylord Convention Center in Washington, D.C., on December 18, 2016. Hernández represented Panama at the Miss Earth 2016 pageant held on October 29, 2016, at the SM Mall of Asia Arena, Pasay, Philippines.

Final results	Contestant
Señorita Panamá World	Panama Centro - Alessandra Bueno Fontaine
Señorita Panamá Earth	Panama Centro - Virginia Isabel Hernández Milachay
Señorita Panamá Hispanoamericana	Colón - Jhasmeiry Cristina Herrera Evans
Señorita Panamá United Continents	Panama Centro - Rita Marianne Silvestre Mogollón

=== Best National Costume ===
Final results	Contest	Designer	Topic
Winner	Best National Costume, to Miss Universe	Daniel Cortina	"Feria de las flores y el cafe"
1st runner-up	Best National Costume, to Miss Earth	Jorge Crespo	"Flor del Espiritu Santo"
2nd runner-up	Best National Costume, to Reina Hispanoamericana	Gabriel Lopez	"Nuestra Belleza indigena"
3rd runner-up	Best National Costume, to Miss United Continents	Javier Hernandez	"Diosa de dos Mares"

== Historical significance ==
- A representative from Panama Centro won Miss Panamá for the 28th time in history; the previous time was Stephanie Vander Werf (2012).

== Candidate notes ==
- Keity Drennan Mendieta was Miss International Panama 2011 and place 4th runner up in Miss International 2011.
- Virginia Isabel Hernández Milachay was Miss World Panama 2013.
- Jhasmeiry Cristina Herrera Evans was Miss International Panama 2015.
- Laura de Sanctis competed in Señorita Panamá 2017 and won the title.
- Margareth Villanueva was selected as Miss Chiriquí for Señorita Panamá 2017 but withdrew.
- Rita Silvestre was selected as Señorita Panamá Continentes Unidos 2016 and placed 6th in Miss Continentes Unidos 2016.
- Leydis Gonzalez won Miss Supranational Panamá 2016 and placed inside the top 20 at the international pageant, she competed for a third time in Señorita Panamá 2019 as Señorita Darién but did not placed inside the top 12.
- Ingrid Suárez was Miss Teen Universe Panama 2013 placing as the second runner up in Miss Teen Universe 2013 and was the first runner up in Miss Supranational Panamá 2016. She also competed in the 4th season of Caribbean's Next Top Model earning the 5th place.
