= Darelys Santos =

Panamanian model (born 1994)

- Born: Darelys Yahel Santos Domínguez; June 28, 1994 (age 32); Panama City, Panama
- Height: 1.95 m (6 ft 5 in)
- Beauty pageant titleholder
- Title: Miss Panama Norte 2017, Miss International Panamá 2017, Miss Supranational Panamá 2020
- Hair color: Black
- Eye color: Brown
- Major competitions: Señorita Panamá 2017 (1st runner-up); Miss International Panamá 2017 (Winner); Miss International 2017 (Top 15); Miss Supranational 2021 (Top 24)

Darelys Yahel Santos Domínguez (born June 28, 1994) is a Panamanian model and beauty pageant titleholder who was crowned Miss International Panamá 2017 and also crowned as Miss Supranational Panamá 2020. She represented Panama at Miss International 2017 and placed Top 15. She also represented her country at Miss Supranational 2021 and placed Top 24, where she was ranked in 17th place.

== Señorita Panamá 2017 ==
Santos is 6 ft 1 in (1.85 m) tall, and competed in the national beauty pageant Señorita Panamá 2017 where she placed as 1st runner-up. She represented the state of Panama Norte.

== Miss International 2017 ==
She represented Panama in the 2017 Miss International pageant, that was held on November 14, 2017, in Tokyo, Japan. She finished in the Top 15 semifinalists.

== Miss Supranational 2021 ==
Due to the COVID-19 pandemic, on 9 October the Señorita Panamá Organization by virtual casting announced Santos as the new Señorita Panamá Supranational for the 2020 and was to represent her country in the Miss Supranational 2021.

Awards and achievements
Preceded by –	Miss Panamá Norte; 2017–2018	Succeeded by Ayhemeis Henríquez
Preceded by Daniela Ochoa	Miss International Panamá; 2017–2018	Succeeded by Shirel Ortiz
Preceded by Krysthelle Barretto	Miss Supranational Panamá; 2020–2021	Succeeded by TBA
