= Karen Jordán =

Panamanian model

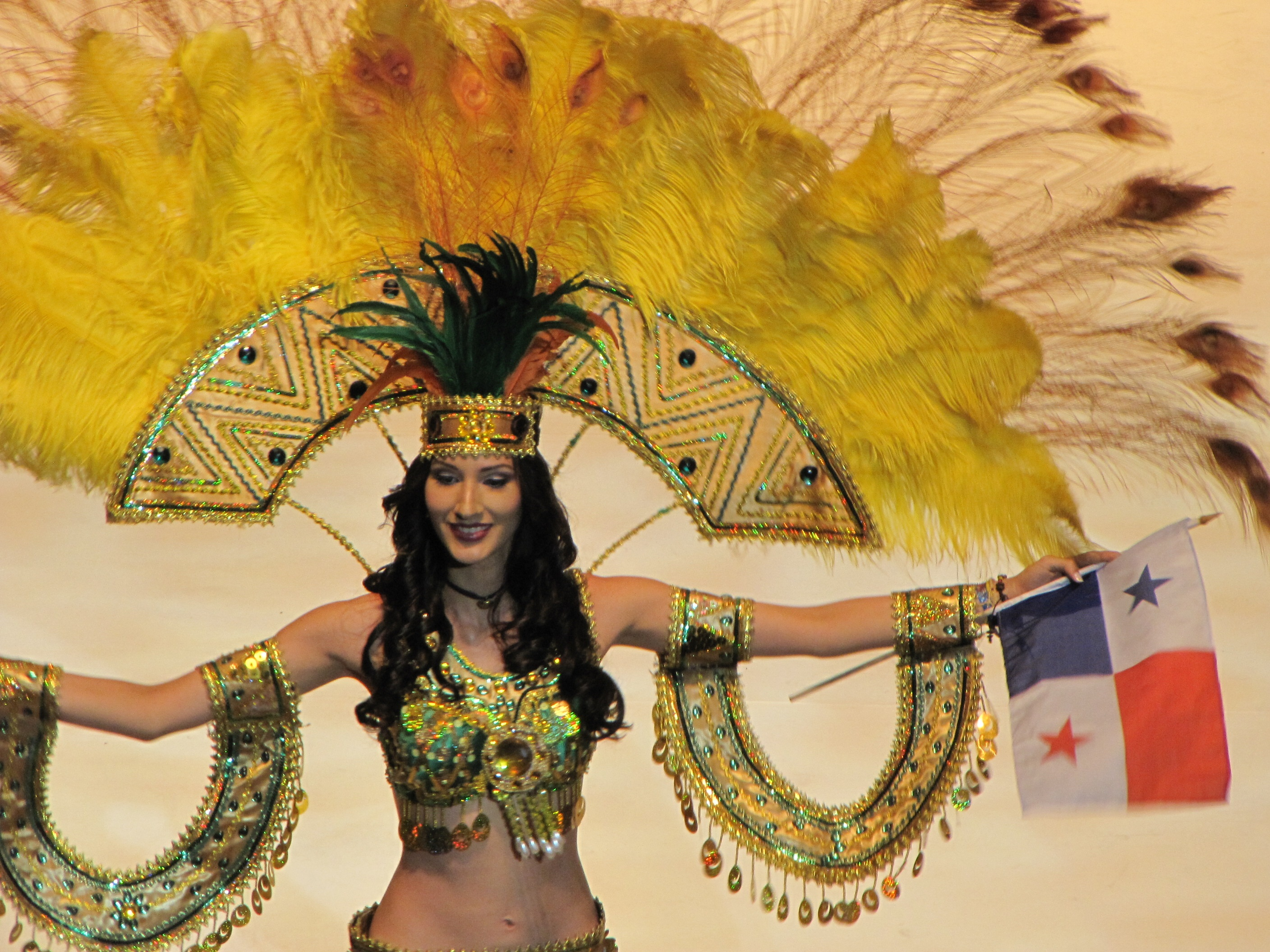
- Karen Jordán, representing Panama at the Reinado Internacional del Café 2011 in Manizales, Colombia.
- Born: Karen Elena Jordán Beitia; January 28, 1989 (age 37); David, Panama
- Height: 1.75 m (5 ft 9 in)
- Beauty pageant titleholder
- Title: Miss Chiriquí 2012
- Hair color: Black
- Eye color: Brown
- Major competitions: Miss Panamá 2012 Miss International Panamá (Winner) Reina de la Costa Maya 2012 (1st Runner-Up) Reinado Internacional del Café 2011 Miss Asia Pacific World 2011 (Miss Talent) Miss International 2012

Karen Elena Jordán Beitia (born 28 January 1989) is a Panamanian model and beauty pageant titleholder who won the Miss International Panamá 2012 title on March 30, 2012 for Miss International 2012 contest.

== Beauty pageant participations ==
She participated in the Panamanian beauty pageant Miss Mundo Panamá 2010, where she managed to stand as one of the finalists.

She was also a participant of the Chica AVON COXMETICS 2010 beauty pageant.

She also represented Panama in the regional beauty pageant Reinado Internacional del Café 2011 in Manizales, Colombia.

In 2011, she won the Miss Asia Pacific Panamá title. The contest took place in South Korea. She won the talent competition.

== Miss Panamá 2012 ==
At the end of the Miss Panamá 2012 she also received awards including Miss Best Body Power Club.

Jordán is 5 ft 9 in (1.75 m) tall, and competed in the national beauty pageant Miss Panamá 2012. She represented the province of Chiriquí.

== Miss International ==
She represented Panama in the 2012 Miss International pageant, held in Chengdu, China on October 21, 2012.

Awards and achievements
Preceded by Sue Guerra	Miss Chiriquí; 2012–2013	Succeeded by María Alejandra Tejada
Preceded by Keity Drennan	Miss International Panamá; 2012-2013	Succeeded by Betzy Madrid
