= Ana Ibáñez =

Panamanian model (born 1986)

Ana Lorena Ibáñez
- Born: Ana Lorena Ibáñez Carles; September 12, 1986 (age 40); Penonomé, Coclé, Panama
- Height: 1.74 m (5 ft 8 1/2 in)
- Beauty pageant titleholder
- Title: Miss Coclé 2012, Miss Earth Panamá 2012
- Hair color: Brown
- Eye color: Brown
- Major competitions: Miss Panamá 2012 (Miss Earth Panamá); Reina Hispanoamericana 2012 (4th runner-up); Miss Earth 2012 (Unplace)

Ana Lorena Ibáñez Carles (born September 12, 1986) is a Panamanian model, beauty pageant titleholder, and winner of the Miss Earth Panamá 2012 title on March 30, 2012, for Miss Earth 2012 contest.

== Early life ==
Born in Penonomé, Ibáñez Carles is a model who began her career with participation in Chico y Chica Modelo. She is also the sister of the first runner-up Señorita Panamá 2004 pageant Ana Isabel Ibáñez Carles. She attained a Bachelor of Business Administration with emphasis in Marketing degree from the Universidada Latina de Panama.

== Miss Panamá 2012 ==
Ibáñez competed in the national beauty pageant Miss Panamá 2012.

== Reina Hispanoamericana 2012 ==
She represented Panama in the Reina Hispanoamericana 2012 beauty pageant held in Bolivia on October 25, 2012. She placed in the top 7 and won the Best National Costume Award.

== Miss Earth ==
She represented Panama in the Miss Earth 2012 pageant, held in Philippines in November 2012, but did not place.

Awards and achievements
| Preceded by Tatiana Campagnani | Miss Coclé; 2012 | Succeeded by Claudia De León |
| Preceded by Marelissa Him | Miss Earth Panamá; 2012 | Succeeded by Johanna Batista |
| Preceded by Marelissa Him | Reina Hispanoamericana Panamá; 2012 | Succeeded by Walkiria Córdoba |
