= Nicole Morrell =

Panamanian model

- Born: Nicole Morrell; August 2, 1990 (age 34); Panama City, Panama
- Height: 1.76 m (5 ft 9 1/2 in)
- Beauty pageant titleholder
- Title: Bellezas Panamá 2010 - Miss Panamá Earth 2010 (Winner)
- Hair color: Brown
- Eye color: Brown

Nicolle Morrell (born August 2, 1990) is a Panamanian actress, model and beauty pageant titleholder who represented the Panamá Centro state in the Bellezas Panamá 2010 pageant on August 2, 2010 and won the title of Miss Panamá Earth 2010.

Morrell who is 5 ft 9.4 in (1.76 m) tall, represented her country at 2010 Miss Earth pageant in Nha Trang, Vietnam on December 4, 2010. She did not place.

Awards and achievements
Preceded by Geraldine Higuera	Miss Panamá Earth; 2010	Succeeded by Marelissa Him
