= Carolina Brid =

Panamanian actress (born 1990)

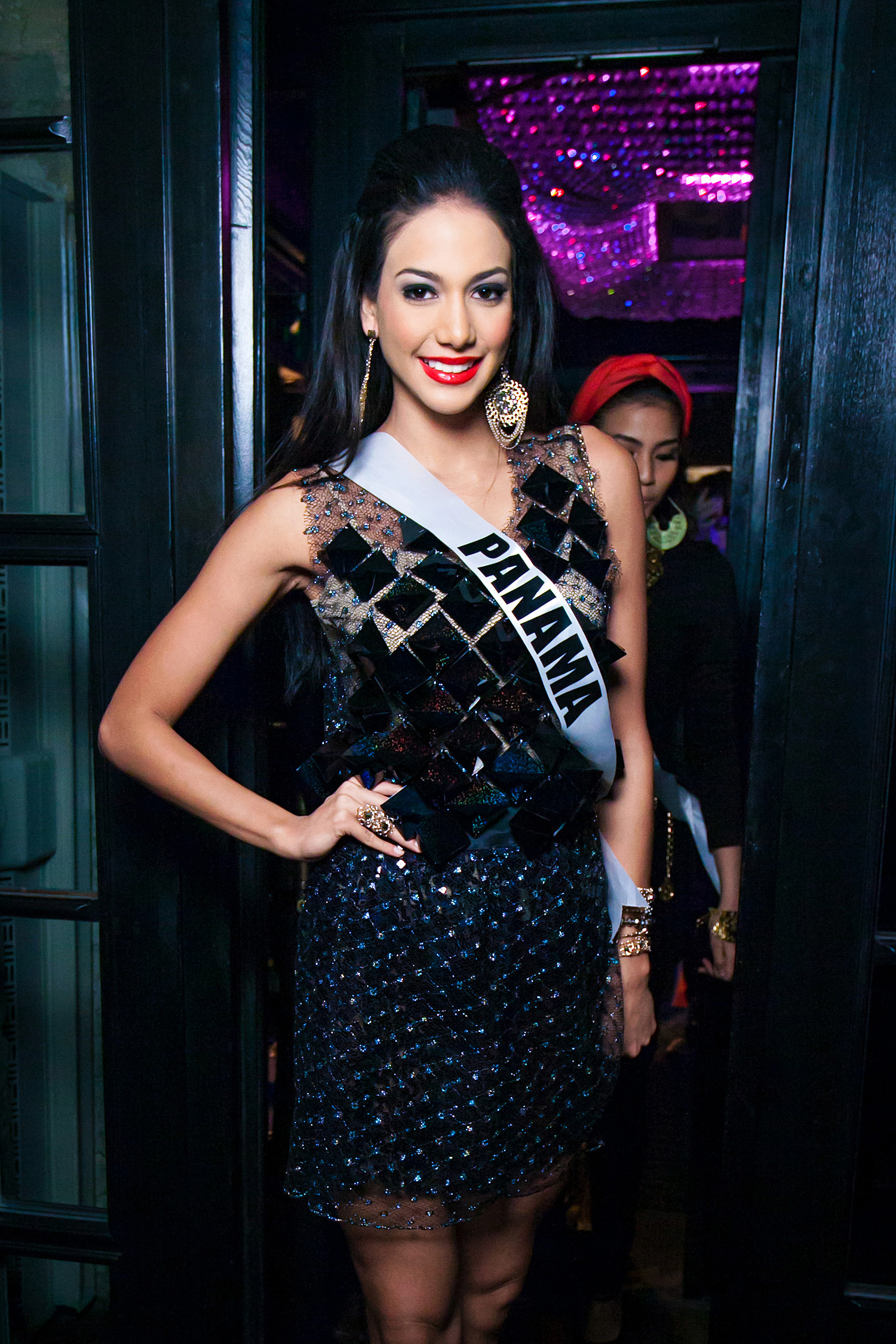
- Born: Carolina del Carmen Brid Cerrud; July 4, 1990 (age 36); Panama City, Panama
- Occupations: TV host, actress
- Height: 1.80 m (5 ft 11 in)
- Beauty pageant titleholder
- Title: Miss Metropolitan International; Miss Tourism Panamá 2011; Miss Panamá 2013
- Hair color: Black
- Eye color: Brown
- Major competitions: Miss Tourism International 2011 (1st runner-up); Miss Universe 2013

Carolina Del Carmen Brid Cerrud (born July 4, 1990) is a Panamanian actress, TV host, model, and beauty pageant titleholder. She won the Miss Tourism Panamá 2011, Miss Metropolitan International 2011, and Miss Panama 2013 beauty pageants, and represented Panama at the Miss Universe 2013 pageant.

== Early life ==
Born in Panama City, Brid graduated from Enrico Fermi Italian High School, where she was a member of the basketball team. She is currently a student of Social Communications at Universidad Católica Santa María La Antigua (USMA) in Panama City, Panama. She speaks Spanish, English, and Italian, and is 5' 11'' (1.80 m).

== Miss Tourism International 2011 ==
In 2011, Brid won Miss Tourism Panamá, and went on to participate in the Miss Tourism International 2011 contest in Malaysia, ranking as first runner-up. In subsequent contests, she was crowned Miss Tourism Metropolitan 2011, as well as the title of Miss Glamour.

== Miss Panamá 2013 ==
Brid competed in the national beauty pageant Miss Panamá 2013, representing the state of Veraguas. She was the favorite of the national and international press.

On April 2, 2013, she won the Miss Panamá Contest, becoming the fourth woman from the province of Veraguas to win the title.

Brid represented Panamá at the Miss Universe 2013 pageant in Moscow, Russia on November 9, 2013. Although a favorite by fans of several pageant websites, even gaining the attention of Miss Venezuela national director Osmel Sousa who predicted Brid would make the final when she competed in the presentation show, she failed to place.

== See also ==
- Virginia Hernández

Awards and achievements
Preceded by Stephanie Vander Werf	Miss Panama; 2013-2014	Succeeded by Yomatzy Hazlewood
Preceded by Astrid Caballero	Miss Veraguas; 2013-2014	Succeeded by Marisel Franco González
Preceded by (Australia) Holly Visser	Miss Tourism Metropolitan International; 2011	Succeeded by (Australia) Monika Radulovic
Preceded by Maricely González	Miss Tourism International Panama; 2011	Succeeded by Cleyris Velasquez
