= Miss Panamá 2011 =

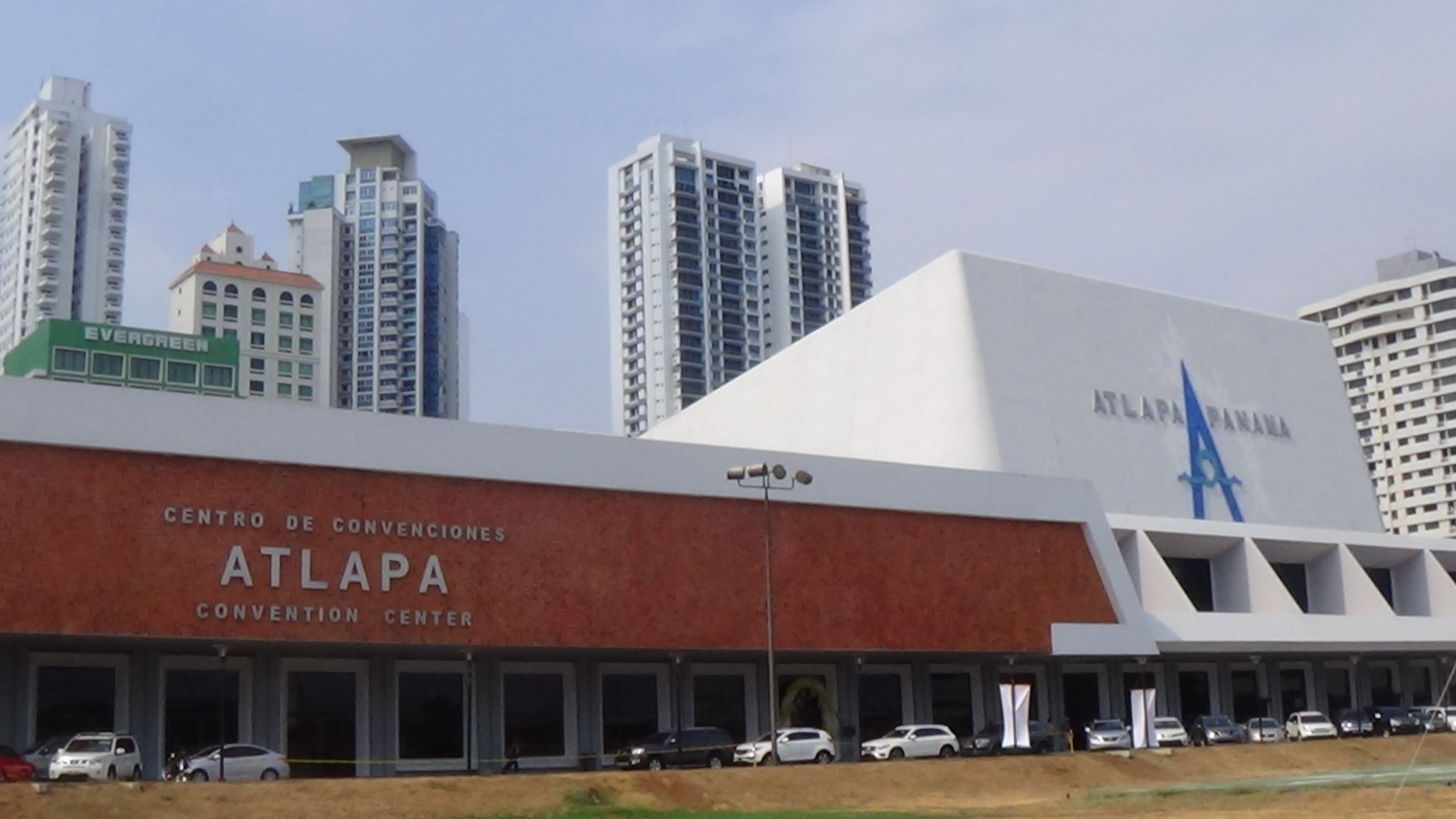
- Atlapa, venue of Miss Panamá 2011
- Date: May 26, 2011
- Presenters: Jorge Herrera, Jenia Nenzen, Michelle Simons & Alvaro Peluffo.
- Entertainment: Amelia Vega and Ricardo Velásquez
- Venue: Atlapa Convention Centre, Panama City, Panama
- Broadcaster: Telemetro
- Entrants: 12
- Placements: 6
- Winner: Sheldry Sáez; Herrera

Miss Panamá 2011 was the 45th Annual Miss Panamá pageant was held in the Atlapa Convention Centre, Panama City, Panama on Thursday 26 May 2011.

After 23 years, the Señorita Panamá pageant, organized by Medcom Corporation, was finally cancelled. A new organization took over in 2011 with the official name of the contest being "Miss Panama" directed by Marisela Moreno.

About 12 contestants from all over Panamá competed for the prestigious crown. Señorita Panamá 2010, Anyolí Ábrego of Veraguas crowned Sheldry Sáez of Herrera at the end of the event as the new Miss Panamá Universe. At the same event, Paola Vaprio Miss World Panama 2010 of Panamá Centro crowned Irene Núñez of Veraguas as ""Miss World Panama.""

The Winner competed in the 60th edition of the Miss Universe 2011 pageant, held in São Paulo, Brazil on September 12, 2011. Was also selected the Winner of the title Miss Panamá World, giving her the right to represent the country in Miss World 2011 was held in London on November 6, 2011.

== Results ==
=== Placements ===
Placement	Contestant
Miss Panamá 2011	Herrera – Sheldry Sáez
Miss Panamá World 2011	Veraguas – Irene Núñez
Miss Panamá International 2011	Panamá Centro – Keity Mendieta
Top 6	Bocas del Toro – Marielena González; Los Santos – Marisel Medina; Panamá Este – Jelenska García

=== Special awards ===
On 5 May 2011, was celebrated the National Costume contestant called Descubre Tu Interior. The winner costume represent Panamá in Miss Universe 2011.

Final results	Contest	Designer	Topic	Contestant
Winner	Best National Costume to Miss Universe	Moises Sandoya	"PARIS, El Cacique Deidad y El Tesoro de Quema"	Sheldry Sáez
1st runner-up		Abdul Juliao Esturain	"Caciques de la Tierra Veraguense"	Irene Núñez
2nd runner-up		Daniel Cortina	"Palacio de las Garzas"	Keity Mendieta

=== Special awards ===
Award	Represent	Contestant
Miss Photogenic	Herrera	Sheldry Sáez
Miss Congeniality	Panama Este	Jelenska García
Best Body Power Club	Veraguas	Jelenska García
Best Evening Gown Design	Bocas del Toro	Juan David Vélez for creation to Marianela Gonzalez

=== Presentation Show ===
At the Preliminary Competition all contestants competed in the Swimsuit and cocktail dress categories as part of the selection for one of the 5 finalists who will be revealed during the beginning of the two-hour live telecast of the Miss Panamá 2011 Pageant live on Telemetro. This Preliminary Competition also called The Runway and the Council of the Misses celebrated on 4 April 2011, where the former beauty queens were invited to observe the performance of all output gateway to choose only one candidate to consider now ready to join the Top 5 of the Grand Final. After hearing a question also, each of the jurors wrote in a paper the name of the region or province that is the candidate of your choice. That it was more options for the Council, would be selected the night.

- Candidate choice: Sheldry Sáez - Miss Herrera

=== Preliminary Interview ===
Held on Wednesday May 25 to Miss Panama candidates were qualified in swimsuit and personal interview.

=== Judges ===
- Amelia Vega - Miss Universe 2003 from Dominican Republic
- Lorena Castillo de Varela, wife of vice president and chancellor of the Republic of Panama.
- Dr. José Agustín Espino, plastic surgeon Organization official Miss Panama.
- José Pablo Ramos, director of the National Lottery.
- Andres Badra, commercial director MEDCOM.
- Marina Rodriguez, Director of Renova Spa Hotel RIU Plaza.
- Christian Serrano, representative Swarovski Elements

== Contestants ==
These are the competitors who have been selected this year.

Represent	Contestant	Age	Height	Hometown
Bocas del Toro	Marielena González Peña	22	1.70 m (5 ft 7 in)	Bocas del Toro
Chiriquí	Sue Eveling Guerra Herrera	24	1.82 m (5 ft 11 3/4 in)	David
Chiriquí Occidente	Ariadna Fernández Rodríguez	18	1.83 m (6 ft 0 in)	Panama City
Coclé	Tatiana Campagnani Gonzalez	23	1.83 m (6 ft 0 in)	Panama City
Colón	Keshia Giselle Leis Luna	23	1.80 m (5 ft 10 3/4 in)	Panama City
Darién	Christine Fábrega Rodriguez	19	1.70 m (5 ft 7 in)	Panama City
Herrera	Sheldry Sáez Bustavino	19	1.73 m (5 ft 8 in)	Chitré
Los Santos	Marisel Medina de la Rosa	19	1.75 m (5 ft 9 in)	Chitré
Panamá Central	Keity Mendieta Britto	20	1.77 m (5 ft 9 3/4 in)	Panama City
Panamá Este	Jelenska García Ureña	23	1.76 m (5 ft 9 1/4 in)	Panama City
Panamá Oeste	Nicole Nathalie Huerbsch	21	1.70 m (5 ft 7 in)	Panama City
Veraguas	Irene Núñez Quintero	23	1.75 m (5 ft 9 in)	Santiago de Veraguas

== Historical significance ==
- Herrera won Señorita Panamá for second time.
- Panamá Centro & Veraguas placed again in the final round for consecutive year.
- Los Santos returned to make the cut to the finals after two years 2009.

== Election schedule ==
- April 4 presentation show
- May 25 competition of interview with the juror
- May 26 Final night, coronation Miss Panamá 2011

== Candidates Notes ==
- Marielena González Peña participate in the national pageant Bellezas Panamá 2009.
- Tatiana Campagnani in 2010 she was part of the Cycle No.1 Miss Model of the World where she was selected as the Miss Model International.
- Sue Eveling Guerra participate in the national pageant Miss International Panamá 2006.
- Keshia Leis participate in the contest Miss Mundo Panamá 2010. She was the First Runner up.
- Keity Mendieta won "Chica Modelo" (a model search) contest in 2008. On June 28 it was announced that she will represent Panamá in the 2011 Miss International pageant which was scheduled to be held probably in China in October, 2011. On November 6, Keity placed as 4th runner up in the Miss International 2011 pageant.
- Sheldry Sáez in 2007, won the Wilhelmina Model Search Panamá. Sheldry Placed top 10 in the Miss Universe 2011 Pageant celebrated in São Paulo, Brazil.
- Marisel Medina participate in the contest Ford Model Super Model of the World Panamá.
- Irene Núñez was Miss Tourism International Panamá 2009 and participate in the Miss Tourism International 2009 in Malaysia. She was Semi-finalists (top 10).
