= Alessandra Bueno =

Panamanian model (born 1991)

- Born: Alessandra Camila Bueno; November 21, 1991 (age 34); Panama City, Panama
- Height: 1.77 m (5 ft 9 1/2 in)
- Beauty pageant titleholder
- Title: Miss Panamá World 2016
- Hair color: Black
- Eye color: Blue
- Major competitions: Miss Panama World 2016 (Winner); Miss World 2016 (Unplaced)

Alessandra Camila Bueno Fontaine (born November 21, 1991) is a Panamanian model and beauty pageant titleholder who won the Miss Panama World 2016 title on September 1, 2016, for Miss World 2016 contest in the United States.

== Miss Panamá World 2016 ==
The election of Señorita Panamá Mundo 2016 took place last night at the Grand Ballroom of the Trump International Hotel in Panama City. The winner is from Panama City, who was crowned by last year's representative in Miss World in Sanya, Diana Jaén.

== Miss World 2016 ==
Alessandra represented Panama at Miss World 2016 pageant but Unplaced.

== See also ==
- Miss Panamá 2016

Awards and achievements
Preceded by Diana Jaén	Miss Panamá World; 2016–2017	Succeeded by Julianne Brittón
