= Stephanie Vander Werf =

- Born: Stephanie Marie Vander Werf Lobato; October 26, 1986 (age 39); Panama City, Panama
- Height: 1.78 m (5 ft 10 in)
- Beauty pageant titleholder
- Title: Miss Panamá Centro 2012
- Hair color: Brown
- Eye color: Brown
- Major competitions: Miss Panamá 2012 (Winner) (Miss Eloquence); Miss Universe 2012 (Unplaced)

Stephanie Marie Vander Werf Lobato (born October 26, 1986) is a Panamanian TV host, model and beauty pageant titleholder who won the Miss Panama 2012 on March 30, 2012, for the Miss Universe 2012 contest.

== Early life ==
Born in Panama City, Vander Werf is a model of Dutch ancestry, and recognized TV host. She graduated in Advertising and Public Relations from Texas Christian University in Fort Worth, Texas, United States.

== Modelling career ==
The start of her modeling career took place at the age of fifteen years, gaining a tremendous success nationally and internationally promptly went on television screens and their own program, which remained on air for a period of two years.

== Miss Panamá 2012 ==
At the end of the Miss Panamá 2012 she also received awards including Miss Eloquence.

Vander Werf is 5 ft 10 in (1.78 m) tall, and competed in the national beauty pageant Miss Panamá 2012. She represented the state of Panamá Centro.

== Miss Universe 2012 ==
She represented Panamá at the 61st Miss Universe pageant held on December 19, 2012, at the Theatre for the Performing Arts at the Planet Hollywood Resort & Casino in Las Vegas, Nevada, United States.

== See also ==
- Maricely González
- Miss Panamá 2012

Awards and achievements
Preceded by Sheldry Sáez	Miss Panama; 2012-2013	Succeeded by Carolina Brid
Preceded by Keity Mendieta	Miss Panamá Centro; 2012-2013	Succeeded by María Gabrielle Sealy
