= Virginia Hernández =

Panamanian model and Miss Panamá Centro World 2013

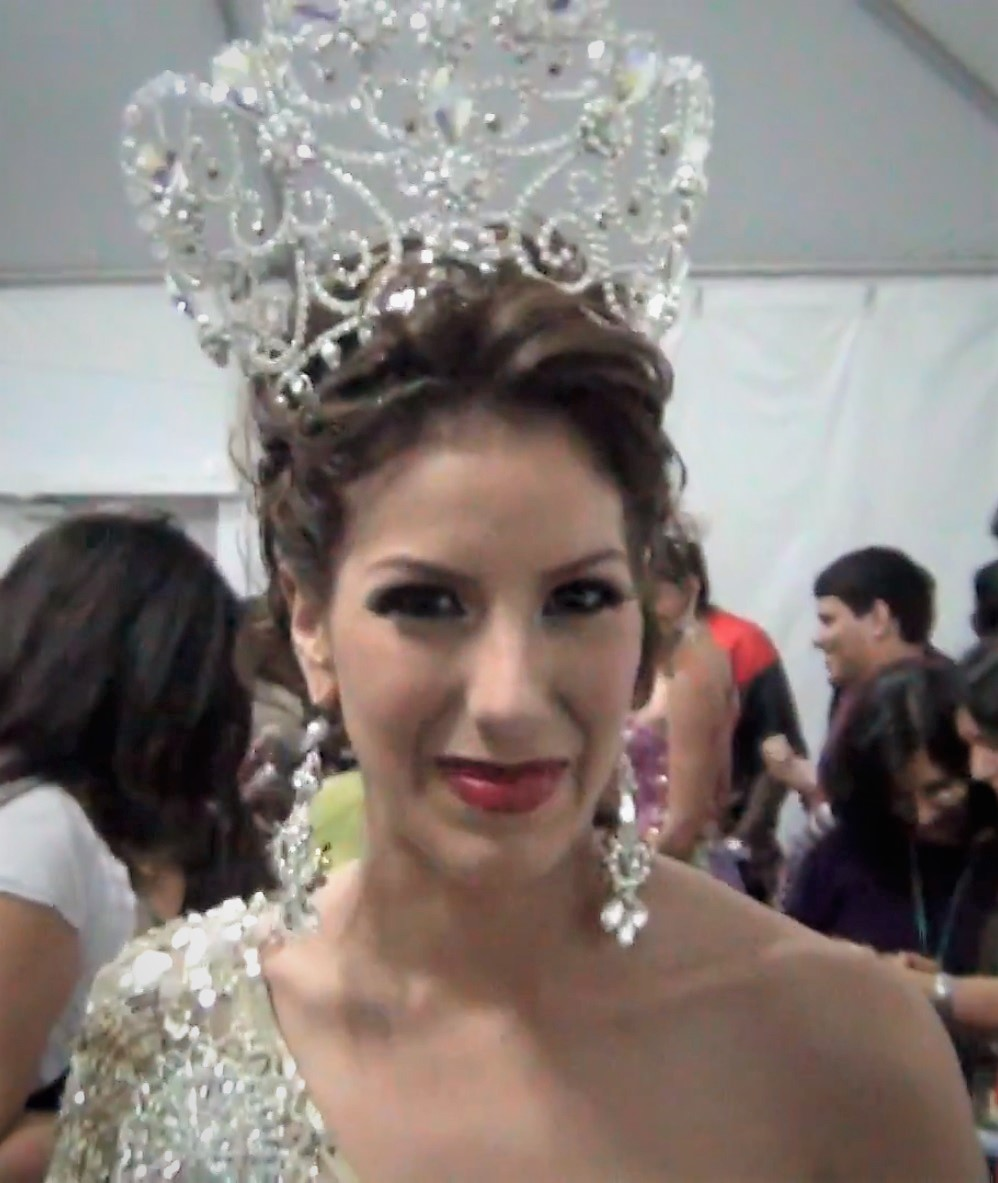
- Virginia Hernandez records a greeting for Verturismo.com.ar in 2013
- Born: Virginia Isabel Hernández Milachay; 26 May 1990 (age 36); Panama City, Panama
- Height: 1.73 m (5 ft 8 in)
- Beauty pageant titleholder
- Title: Miss World Panamá 2013, Miss Earth Panamá 2016
- Hair color: Brown
- Eye color: Brown
- Major competitions: Miss World Panamá 2013 (Winner) (Miss Congeniality); Miss World 2013 (Unplaced); Miss Earth 2016 (Unplaced)

Virginia Isabel Hernández Milachay (born 26 May 1990) is a Panamanian model and beauty pageant titleholder who won the Miss Panama World 2013 title on 8 January 2013 for Miss World 2013 contest. On August 1, she was designated to represent Panamá in the 2016 Miss Earth pageant.

== Participation in contests ==
She participated in the Miss World University Panamá 2010 competition and represented her country in the Miss World University 2010 in South Korea where she won the Miss Congeniality.

== Miss Panamá World 2013 ==
At the end of the Miss Panamá 2013 she also received awards including Miss Congeniality.

Hernández is 5 ft 8 in (1.73 m) tall, and competed in the national beauty pageant Miss Panamá 2013. She represented the state of Panamá Centro .

== Miss World 2013 ==
She represented Panama in the Miss World 2013 pageant held on 28 September 2013, at the Sentul International Convention Center in Indonesia.

== Miss Earth 2016 ==
Hernández represented Panama at Miss Earth 2016 where she failed to place. The Miss Earth crown was won by Katherine Espín of Ecuador.

Awards and achievements
Preceded by Maricely González	Miss Panamá World; 2013–2014	Succeeded by Raiza Erlenbaugh
Preceded by Carmen Jaramillo	Miss Panamá Earth; 2016–2017	Succeeded by Erika Parker
