= Keity Drennan =

Panamanian model (born 1990)

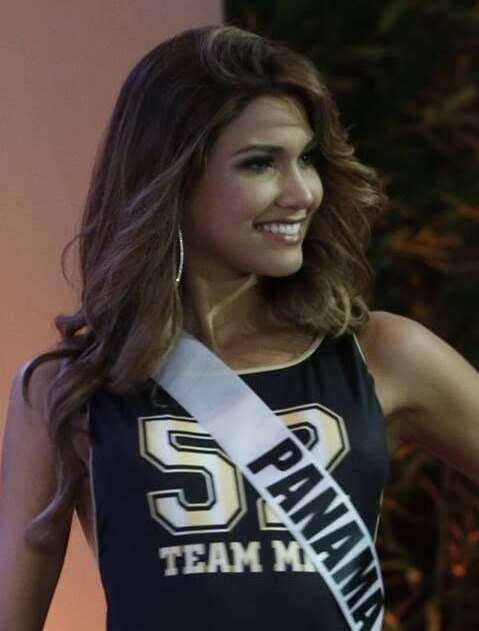
- Drennan during 65th Miss Universe activities
- Born: Keity Mendieta Britton; 24 July 1990 (age 36); Panama City, Panama
- Height: 1.77 m (5 ft 9 1/2 in)
- Beauty pageant titleholder
- Title: Miss Panamá International 2011; Miss Panamá 2016
- Hair color: Brown
- Eye color: Hazel
- Major competitions: Miss Panamá 2011; (2nd Runner-Up); Miss International 2011; (4th Runner-Up); Miss Panamá 2016; (Winner); Miss Universe 2016; (Top 13)

Keity Drennan Britton (née Mendieta Britton; born 24 July 1990) is a Panamanian model and beauty pageant titleholder who won the Miss International Panamá 2011 and Miss Panamá 2016 title. She also participated in Miss Panamá 2011 where she won the title of Virreina Panamá and represented Panama at Miss Universe 2016 pageant where she placed in the Top 13.

== Modeling career ==
The start of her modeling career took place when she won the "Chica Chico Modelo" contest in 2008. It gave Drennan the chance to work for Physical Modelos, her official modeling agency as of today and to represent Panama in the Ford Models' Supermodel of the World 2008.

In the same year, she represented Panama in the Miss Teen America and the Caribbean, winning three awards: Miss Teen Photogenic, Miss Teen Model and Third Princess contest.

== Pageantry ==
=== Miss Panamá 2011 ===
Drennan is 5 ft 9 in (1.77 m) tall, and competed in the national beauty pageant Miss Panamá 2011, obtained the title of Virreina Panamá. She represented the state of Panamá Centro.

=== Miss International 2011 ===
She represented Panama in the Miss International 2011 pageant, held in Chengdu, China, on 6 November 2011. She finished as 4th runner-up.

=== Miss Panamá 2016 ===
Drennan was selected in a casting made on 26 April 2016 where she was selected as Miss Panamá 2016 to represent Panama in Miss Universe 2016.

=== Miss Universe 2016 ===
Drennan represented Panama at Miss Universe 2016 where she placed in the Top 13.

== See also ==
- Miss Panamá 2011
- Miss Panamá 2016

Awards and achievements
Preceded by Gladys Brandao	Miss Panama; 2016-2017	Succeeded by Laura de Sanctis
Preceded by Katherine Dolande	Miss Panamá Centro; 2011	Succeeded by Stephanie Vander Werf
Preceded by Michelle Ostler Cosme	Miss International Panamá; 2011	Succeeded by Karen Jordán
