= Maricely González =

Panamanian model (born 1988)

- Born: Maricely del Carmen González Pomares; 28 February 1988 (age 38); Panama City, Panama
- Height: 1.73 m (5 ft 8 in)
- Beauty pageant titleholder
- Title: Miss Bocas del Toro 2012
- Hair color: Brown
- Eye color: Brown
- Major competitions: Nuestra Belleza Latina 2010 (Top 20); Miss Tourism International 2010 (Top 20); Miss World Panamá 2012 (Winner) (Miss Photogenic) (Best national Costume); Miss World 2012 (Top 30); Miss Continente Americano 2012 (1st Runner-up)

Maricely del Carmen González Pomares (born 28 February 1988) is a Panamanian model and beauty pageant titleholder. She was the winner of the Miss Panama World 2012 title on 30 March 2012 for the Miss World 2012 contest.

== Participation in contests ==
She participated in the competition for TV Nuestra Belleza Latina 2010 Univision where she managed to enter the group of 20.

In 2010, she participated in the Miss Tourism International 2010 in Malaysia. She ranked among the (top 20) semi-finalists.

== Miss Panamá 2012 ==
At the end of the Miss Panamá 2012 she also received awards including Miss Photogenic and Best National Costume.

González is 5 ft 8 in (1.73 m) tall, and she represented the state of Bocas del Toro.

== Miss World 2012 ==
She represented Panama in the 62nd Miss World pageant, which was held in Ordos, Inner Mongolia, China on 18 August 2012. She placed among the top 30 finalists, after having placed in the top 10 of the Miss World Talent fast track.

== Miss Continente Americano 2012 ==
She represented Panama in the 7th annual contest of Miss Continente Americano in Guayaquil, Ecuador on 29 September 2012, where she placed as 1st runner-up.

Awards and achievements
Preceded by Irene Núñez	Miss Panamá World; 2012–2013	Succeeded by Virginia Hernández
Preceded by Marielena González	Miss Bocas del Toro; 2012–2013	Succeeded by Jeniffer Brown
Preceded by Irene Núñez	Miss Tourism International Panama; 2010	Succeeded by Carolina Brid
Preceded by Anyolí Ábrego	Miss Continente Americano Panama; 2012–2013	Succeeded by Maria Gabrielle Sealy
