= Penonomé =

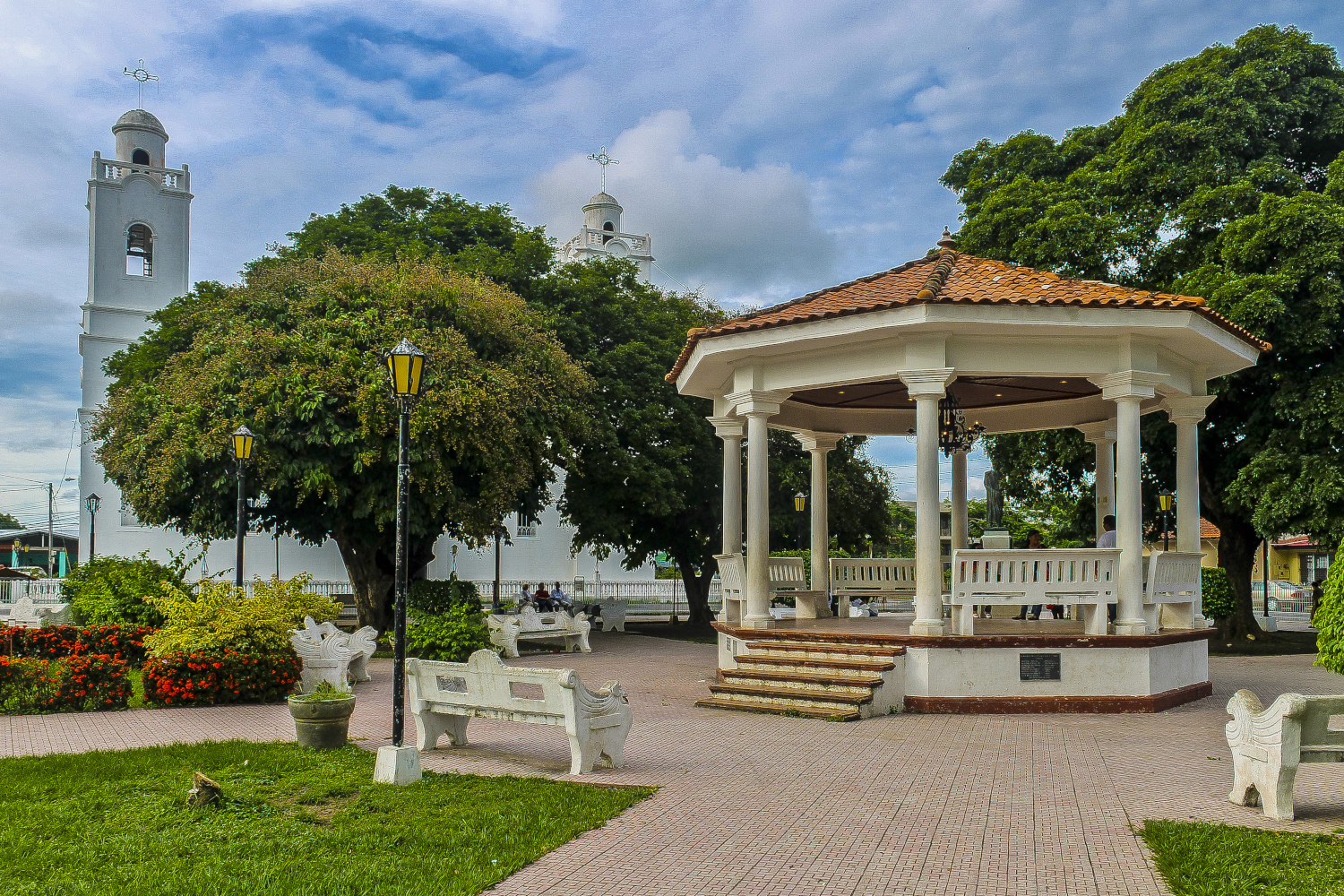
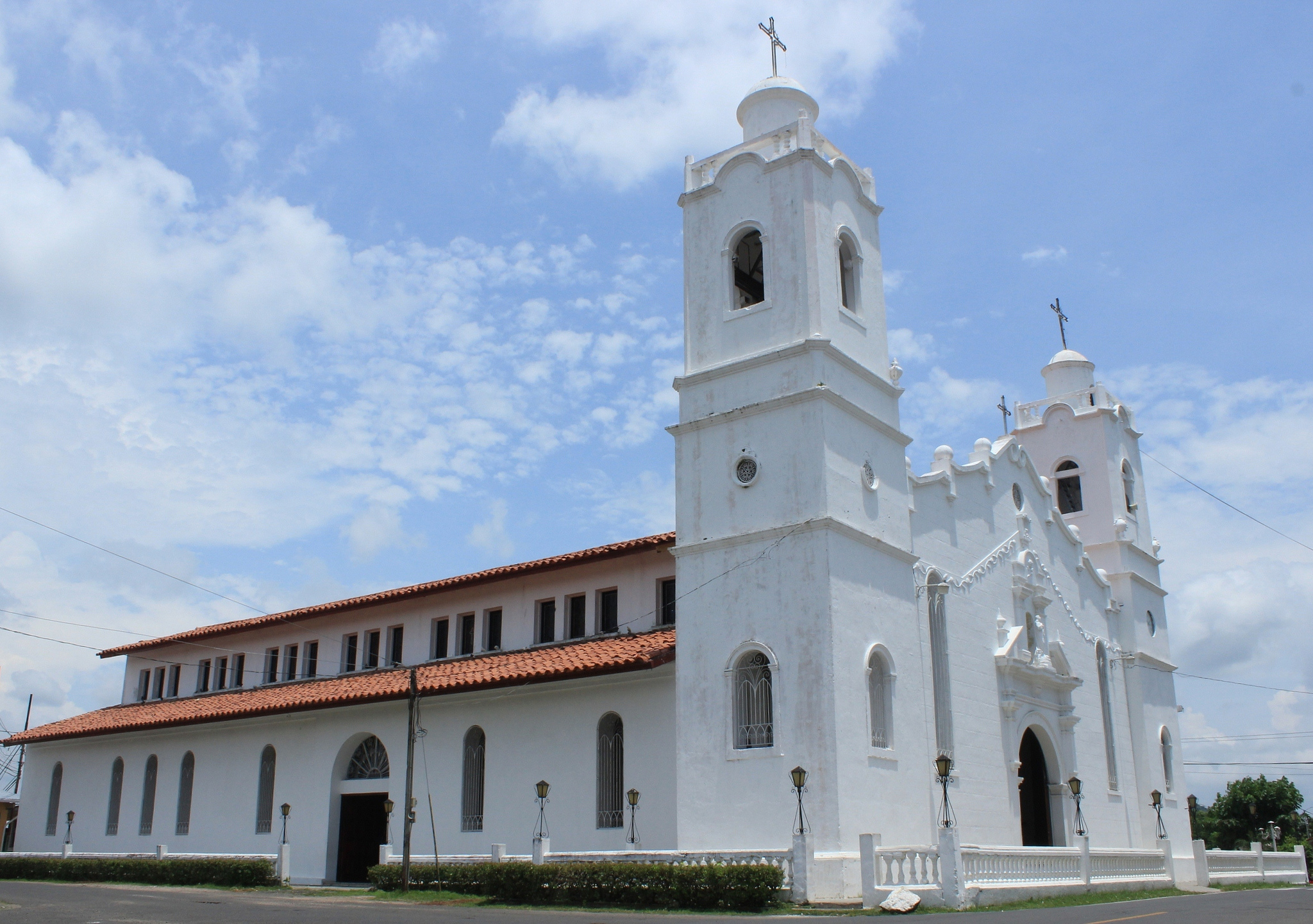
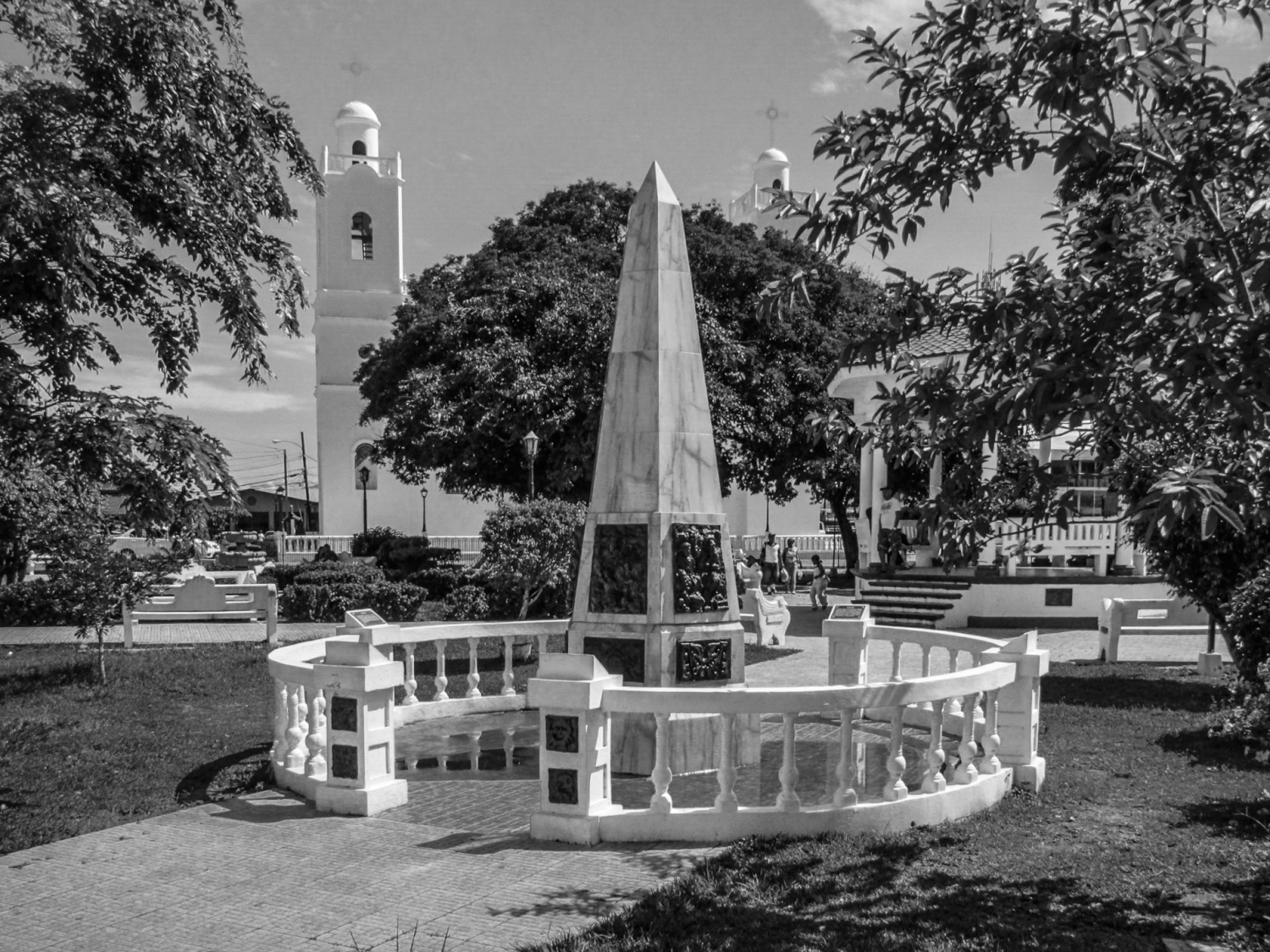
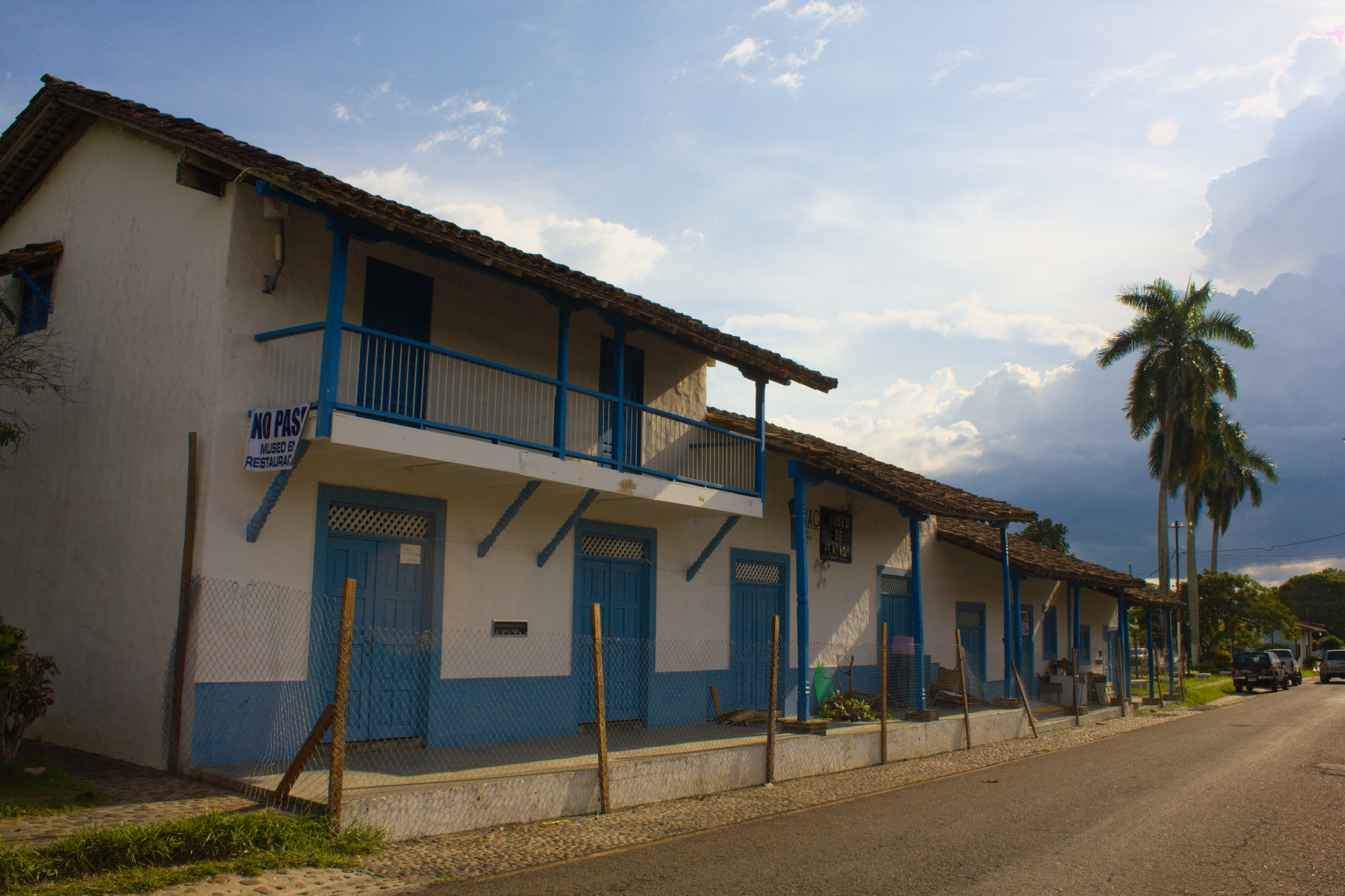
- Top to bottom, left to right: November 8 Park, the Saint John the Baptist Cathedral, the Monument dedicated to the districts of Coclé Province, and the Penonomé Museum.

- Location within Panama
- Coordinates: 8.518722°N 80.355291°W
- Country: Panama
- Province: Coclé
- District: Penonomé
- Founded: April 30, 1581

Government
  - Mayor: Paula Gonzalez

Area
  - Land: 53 km^{2} (20 sq mi)
- Elevation: 70 m (230 ft)

Population (2010)
  - City: 21,748
  - Density: 410.7/km^{2} (1,064/sq mi)
  - Metro: 88,143
- Population density calculated based on land area.
- Time zone: UTC−5 (EST)
- Climate: Aw
- Website: penonome.municipios.gob.pa

Penonomé (Spanish pronunciation: [penonoˈme]) is the capital of Penonomé District and of Coclé Province in Panama. The town is located in the geographic center of Panama along the Inter-American Highway in the wide, flat lowlands of central Coclé.

== History ==
=== Overview ===
Penonomé was founded in 1581. The name of this town comes from the words "penó Nomé". Nomé was a chief of a local Native American tribe who resisted the Spanish conquistadores and was put to death by colonial officials. "Penó Nomé" means "Nomé was punished." The town was the capital of Panama for a short period after Panama City was sacked by Henry Morgan in 1671.

The town is home to many descendants of Turkish, Chinese, and Arab immigrants. Its population as of 1990 was 12,117; its population as of 2000 was 15,841.

=== Local legend ===
Local legend (unknown origin) has it that Nomé was a chieftain in love with an indigenous woman named Zaratí. His tribe didn't want him to marry and so told him that his beloved had drowned. Trying desperately and without success to find her, he threw himself from a bluff, crying out "I'm coming Zara!" Hence the names of the Zaratí River and Penonomé ("Penó Nomé" in Spanish meaning "Nomé mourned", with subject and verb inverted).

== Landmarks ==
The Catedral de Penonomé and the municipal government office (Casa de Gobierno) are located on the town's central plaza. The town also has a small museum, El Museo de Penonomé, which is often closed. The town has two main shopping streets, Avenida Juan Demóstenes Arosemena and the Inter-American Highway along the edge of town.

Penonomé is the location of several football stadiums, including the Estadio Virgilio Tejeira, built in 2001. It was funded by FIFA as a part of the Goal Project to support Panama's national team.

== Transport ==
Penonomé is served by buses to many locations in Panama.

== Notable people ==
- Arnulfo Arias (1901–1988) – physician and former President of Panama
- Harmodio Arias Madrid (1886–1962) – politician and former President of Panama
- Alcibíades Arosemena (1883–1958) – 15th President of Panama
- Ana Ibáñez (born 1986) – former Miss Earth Panama 2012
- Esther Neira de Calvo (1890–1978) – women's rights activist, recipient of the Order of Vasco Nunez de Balboa and many more awards
- José Gabriel Carrizo (born 1983) – Vice President of Panama
- Carlos Chávez (1928–2006) – Olympic weightlifter
- Ezequiel Fernández (1886–1946) – politician and former acting President of Panama
- Diana Jaén (born 1992) – Miss World Panama 2015
- Gladys de la Lastra (1932–2005) – musician and national hero
- Shey Ling Him (born 1986) – former Miss World Panama 2007
- Ramón Maximiliano Valdés (1867–1918) – politician and former President of Panama

== See also ==
- Diocese of Penonomé
