= Sheldry Sáez =

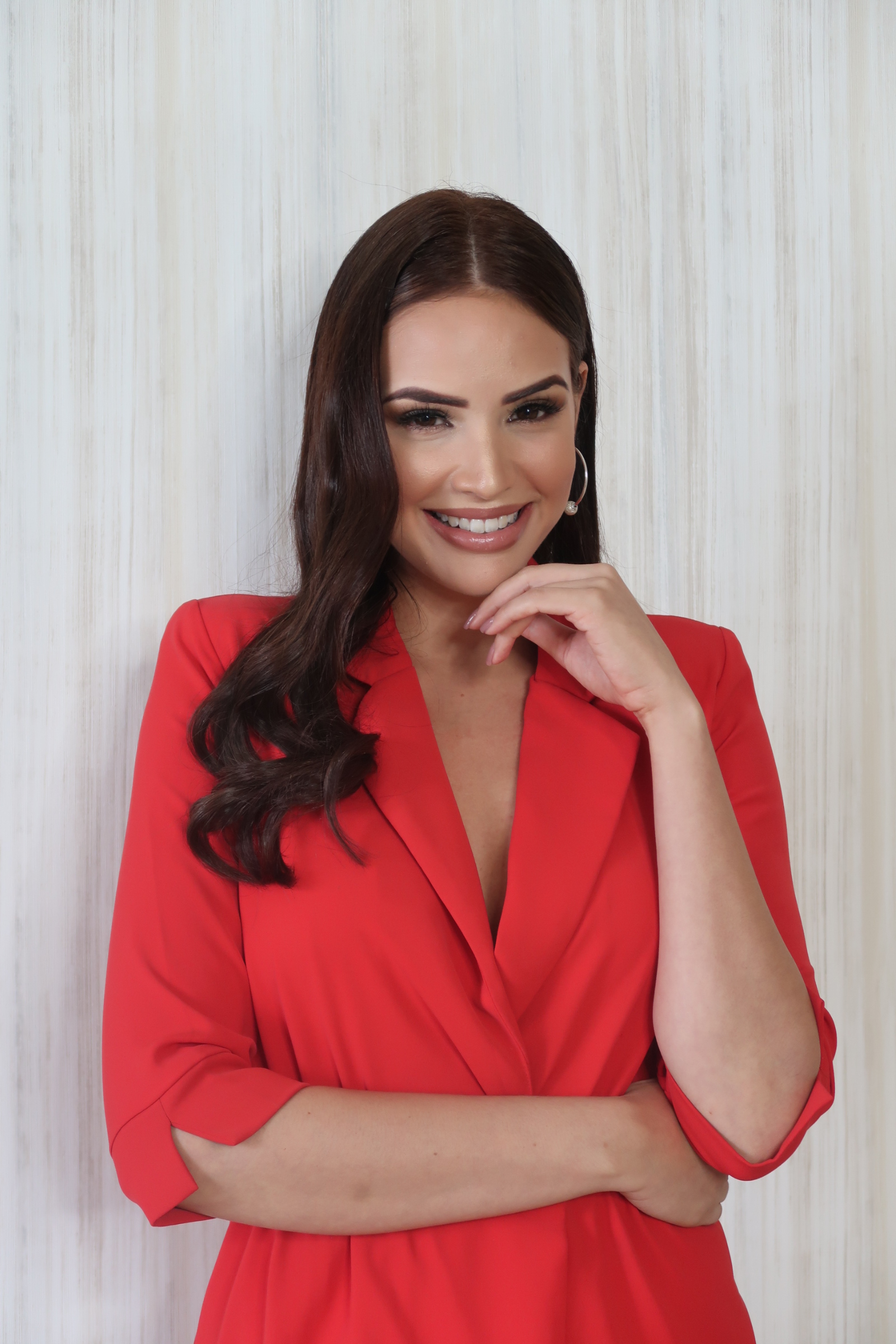
- Sheldry Sáez (2020)
- Born: Sheldry Nazareth Sáez Bustavino; January 15, 1992 (age 34); Chitré, Herrera, Panama
- Height: 1.73 m (5 ft 8 in)
- Beauty pageant titleholder
- Title: Miss Herrera 2011; Miss Panamá 2011
- Hair color: Brown
- Eye color: Brown
- Major competitions: Miss Panamá 2011 (Winner); Miss Universe 2011 (Top 10)

Sheldry Nazareth Sáez Bustavino (born January 15, 1992, in Chitré, Herrera) is a Panamanian dancer, model, TV Host and beauty pageant titleholder who won Miss Panamá 2011. she represented Panama at Miss Universe 2011 and made Top 10.

== Modelling career ==
The start of her modeling career took place when she won the "Wilhelmina Model Search" contest in 2007. It gave Saez the chance to work for Wilhelmina Panama Talents, her official modeling agency as of today.

== Miss Panamá 2011 ==
At the end of the Miss Panamá 2011 she also received awards including Best Fantasy Costume, Miss Photogenic, and "Misses Council," awarded by the panel of judges that included former beauty queens and participants of Miss Panama.

Sáez is 5 ft 8 in (1.73 m) tall, and competed in the national beauty pageant Miss Panamá 2011, where she obtained the title of Miss Panamá Universo. She represented the province of Herrera.

== Miss Universe 2011 ==
She represented Panama in the 60th Miss Universe 2011 which was held in the Credicard Hall, São Paulo, Brazil on September 12, 2011. She place in the top 10 and won the Best National Costume Award.

== See also ==
- Irene Núñez
- Miss Panamá 2011

Awards and achievements
Preceded by Anyolí Ábrego	Miss Panama; 2011-2012	Succeeded by Stephanie Vander Werf
Preceded by Amelia Cuesta	Miss Herrera; 2011-2012	Succeeded by Yinela Yero
