= Anyolí Ábrego =

Panamanian model and beauty pageant winner

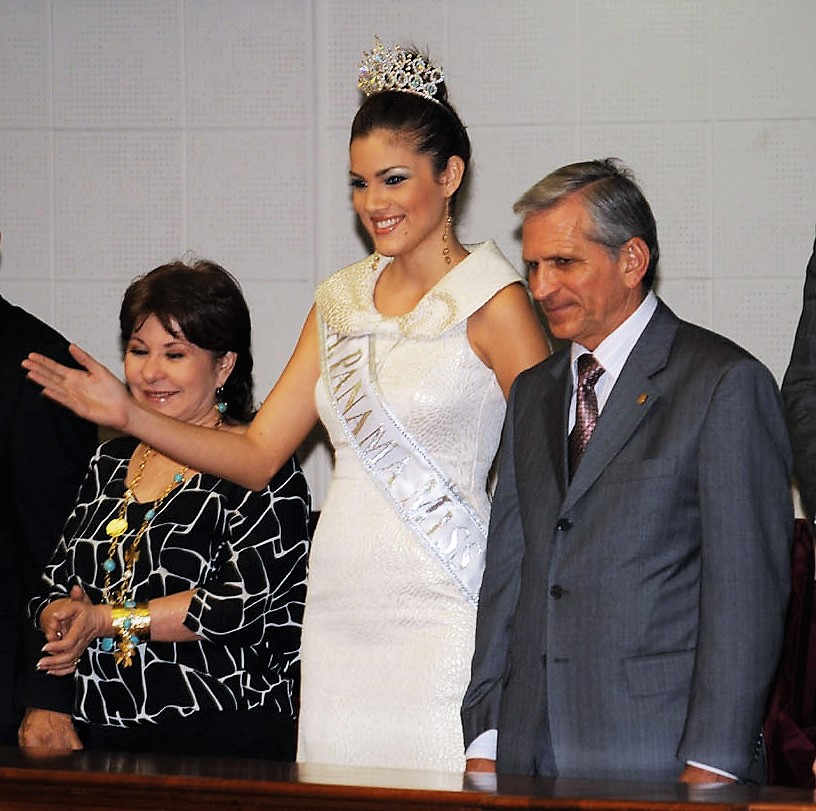
- Ábrego addresses the Congress of the Republic of Peru alongside the Panamanian ambassador, 2010
- Born: 16 November 1987 (age 38); Panama City, Panama
- Height: 1.77 m (5 ft 9 1/2 in)
- Beauty pageant titleholder
- Title: Miss Panama Universe 2010
- Hair color: Brunette
- Eye color: Hazel
- Major competition: Señorita Panamá 2010

Anyoli Amorette Abrego Sanjur (born 16 November 1987) is a Panamanian model and beauty pageant titleholder who was the winner of the Señorita Panamá 2010 contest on 8 July 2010. She represented Panama in the 59th Miss Universe 2010 which was held in the Mandalay Bay Events Center, Las Vegas, Nevada, United States, on 23 August 2010.

== Career ==
Abrego's start in the modeling world took place when she joined the "Chica Modelo" (a model search) contest in 2006, where she won at 19 years old. It also gave her the chance to work for Physical Modelos, her official modeling agency as of today. As a model, Anyoli has been in calendars, commercials and stewardess of different events.

Anyoli also competed in the Ford Super Model of the World 2006 in NY, in the Miss Model of The World 2009, where she reached the semi-final round. There she gained the contest Miss Beauty International 2007 in Ecuador and the Miss Pacifico 2010 in Playa Linda, Chiapas, Mexico, where she was first runner up. Later, Abrego assumed the title of Miss Pacifico when the Miss Pacifico Organization revoked the crown from then reigning titleholder.

Awards and achievements
Preceded by Diana Broce	Miss Panama; 2010-2011	Succeeded by Sheldry Sáez
Preceded by Joan Nachell Ramos Castillo	Miss Continete Americano Panama; 2011–2012	Succeeded by Maricely González
Preceded by (United States) Vanessa Galindo	Miss Pacífico; 2010-2011	Succeeded by (Costa Rica) Natalia Gómez
