= Señorita Panamá 2010 =

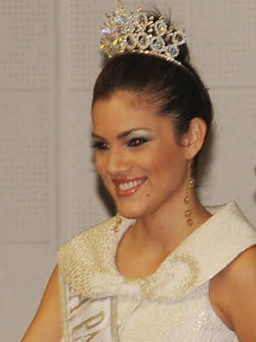
- Anyolí Ábrego Señorita Panamá 2010
- Date: July 8, 2010
- Presenters: Alex Medela, Michelle Simmons, Rosseta Bordanea & Carolina Fábrega
- Entertainment: Olanda Angarita
- Venue: Sheraton Hotel, Panama City, Panama
- Broadcaster: Telemetro
- Entrants: 10
- Placements: 3
- Winner: Anyolí Ábrego; Veraguas
- Best National Costume: Paola Vaprio; Coclé

Señorita Panamá 2010 was the 27th edition of the Señorita Panamá pageant and 44th Miss Panamá pageant selected to the Miss Universe. It was held at the Sheraton Hotel, Panama City, Panama on Thursday 8, July 2010.

About 10 contestants from all over Panamá competed for the prestigious crown. Señorita Panamá 2009, Diana Broce of Los Santos crowned Anyolí Ábrego of Veraguas at the end of the event as the new Señorita Panamá.

Ábrego represented Panama in the 59th Miss Universe 2010 which was held in the Mandalay Bay Events Center, Las Vegas, Nevada, United States, on August 23, 2010.

== Results ==
=== Placements ===
Placement	Contestant
Señorita Panamá 2010	Veraguas – Anyolí Ábrego
1st Runner-Up	Panama Centro – Katherine Dolande
2nd Runner-Up	Chiriquí – Ana Mabel Miranda

=== Special awards ===
Final results	Contest	Designer	Topic	Contestant
Winner	Best National Costume to Miss Universe	Gabriel Lopez	"Taburete"	Paola Vaprio

=== Judges ===
- Miguel Herrera - Ex-juror of Realmente Bella
- Gloria Quintana - Ex-Miss Hispanidad 1989 and Señorita Panamá 1989
- Exidio Zelaya - Honduran journalist

== Last edition ==
Señorita Panamá was born in 1982 and organized by RPC TV Channel 4. It was held consecutively for many years except in 1988 and 2007. 2010 was the last edition before its current owner at the time, MEDCOM Corporation, leased the pageant to the Miss Panama Organization in a 5-year contract (2011-2015).

== Background music ==
- Olanda Angarita - "Jamás"

== Presentation show ==
At the Final Competition all contestants competed in the Cóctel Gown categories as part of the presentation of the top 10 finalists who will be revealed the top 3 during the final of the two-hour live telecast of the Señorita Panamá 2010 Pageant live on Telemetro on Thursday, July 8. This presentation to the press was held in the Lounge Great Barú of the Hotel Sheraton.

== Contestants ==
After a rigorous casting, 10 finalists were chosen to take part in the pageant.

Represent	Contestant	Age	Measurements	Height (m)	Hometown
Panamá Norte	Valerie Sattkowski	20	33-24-36	1.67	Panama City
Panamá Este	Marelissa Him	21	33-23-36	1.70	Panama City
Panamá Oeste	Sara Ruiz	23	33-24-34	1.68	Panama City
Panamá Centro	Katherine Dolande	24	31-23-33	1.72	Panama City
Coclé	Paola Vaprio	23	33-25-36	1.76	Panama City
Herrera	Amelia Cuesta	24	33-24-36	1.7	Panama City
Colón	Elianys Colon	20	33-24-35	1.76	Colón
Chiriquí	Ana Mabel Miranda	23	35-23-37	1.77	David
Veraguas	Anyolí Ábrego	23	33-25-36	1.77	Santiago de Veraguas
Los Santos	Natasha Diaz Godzikowski	21	33-25-35	1.78	Panama City

== Historical significance ==
- Veraguas won Señorita Panamá for Four time (before 1992) with Giselle Amelia González Aranda.
- Panamá Centro placed against in the final round for consecutive year.
- Chiriquí returned to making calls to the finals after two years 2008.

== Election schedule ==
- Monday July 5 presentation to the press in Lounge Great Barú of the Hotel Sheraton.
- Wednesday July 7 competition of interview with the juror.
- Thursday July 8 Final night, coronation Señorita Panamá 2010.

== Candidates notes ==
- Sara Ruiz participate in the Reinado Internacional del Banano 2005 in Ecuador and won the title Miss Congeniality.
- Anyoli Abrego participate in the contest Miss Model of the World 2009 in China where she place in the Top 30 and the Miss Pacifico 2010 in Playa Linda, Chiapas, Mexico, where she placed first runner up. She failed to place in the semifinals at Miss Universe 2010 in Las Vegas, Nevada, United States.
- Paola Vaprio won the contest Miss Mundo Panamá 2010 the August 26, 2010. She participate in the Miss World 2010 in Sanya, China, also her sister of the Señorita Panamá-Miss Mundo 2005, Anna Isabella Vaprio Medaglia.
- Amelia Cuestas participate in the Reinado Internacional del Banano 2010 in Ecuador.
- Marelissa Him represent Panamá in Miss Earth 2011 as Miss Earth Panamá 2011 in Quezon City, Philippines.
