= Señorita Panamá 2005 =

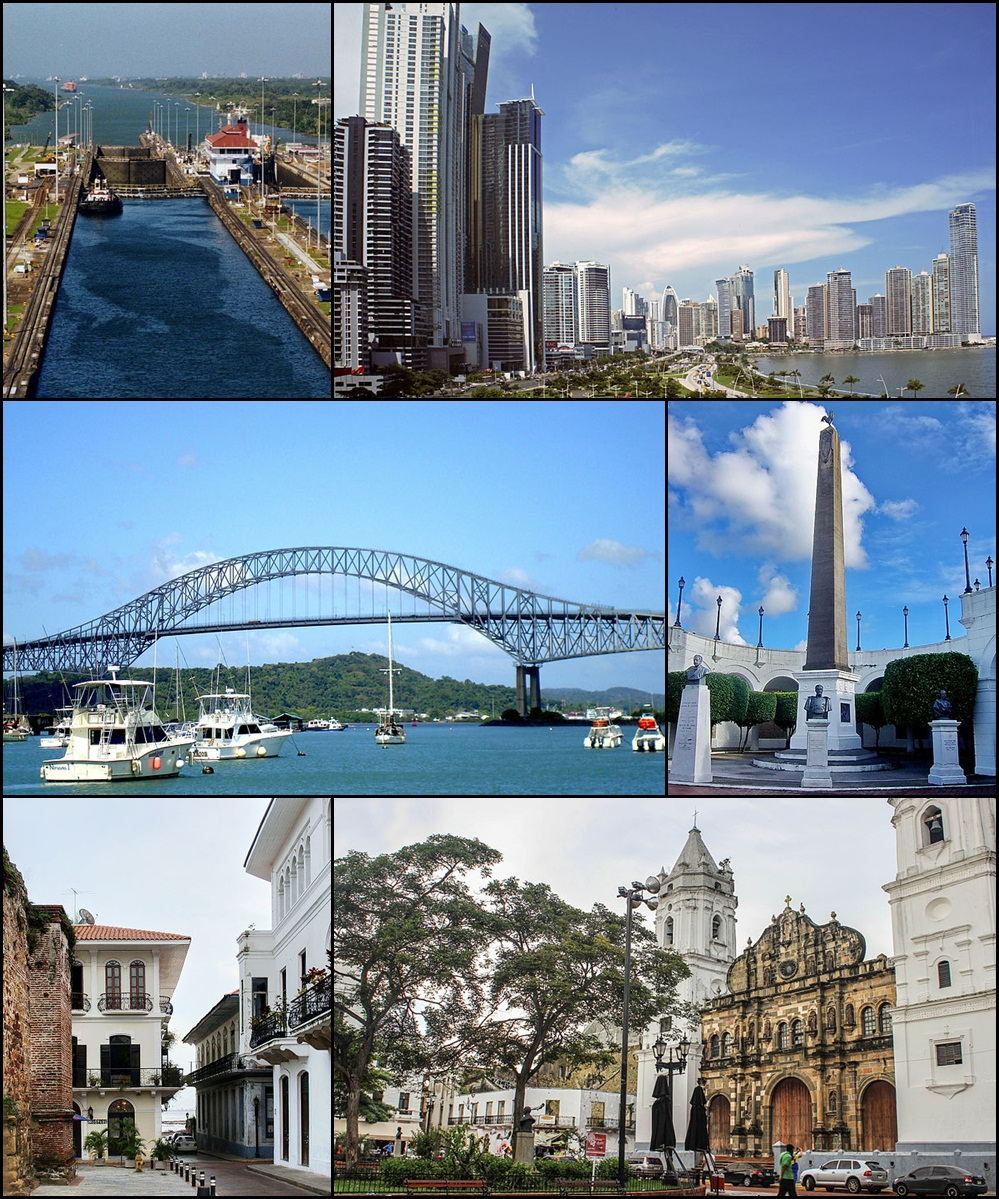
- Panama City host of Señorita Panamá 2005
- Date: September 24, 2005
- Presenters: Carlos Mastellari, Marisela Moreno & Madelaine Legnadier
- Entertainment: Alejandro Lagrota, Iván Barrios & Grupo Negros.
- Venue: Centro de Convenciones Vasco Núñez del Hotel El Panamá, Panama City, Panama
- Broadcaster: RPC Televisión
- Entrants: 15
- Placements: 5
- Winner: María Alessandra Mezquita Lapadula; Panama Centro

Señorita Panamá 2005 the 23rd Annual Señorita Panamá pageant and 40th celebration of the Miss Panama contest, was held in the Centro de Convenciones Vasco Núñez, Panama City, Panama on Saturday 24, September 2005.

About 15 contestants from all over Panamá competed for the prestigious crown. Señorita Panamá 2004, Rosa María Hernández of Los Santos crowned to María Alessandra Mezquita of Panama Centro as the new Señorita Panamá.

This year there was a new change, a day before on Friday 23, was celebrated the final competition entitled "Señorita Panamá Mundo" was announced the winner of the Señorita Panamá Mundo title. Melissa Piedrahita Señorita Panamá World 2003 crowned Anna Isabella Vaprio as her successor at the end of the event.

Fifteen contestants competed for the national title.

Mezquita competed in the Miss Universe 2006, the 55th edition of the Miss Universe pageant, was held at the Shrine Auditorium in, Los Angeles, United States on July 23, 2006. Vaprio competed in the Miss World 2005, the 55th edition of the Miss World pageant, was held on 10 December 2005 at the Crown of Beauty Theatre in Sanya, China.

== Results ==
=== Placements ===
| Placement | Contestant |
|---|---|
| Señorita Panamá 2005 | Panamá Centro – María Alessandra Mezquita |
| Señorita Panamá World 2005 | Panamá Centro – Anna Vaprio |
| 1st Runner-Up | Panamá Centro – Isy Rengifo |
| 2nd Runner-Up | Panamá Centro – Debbie González |
| 3rd Runner-Up | Darién – Sorangel Matos |

=== Special awards ===
| Final results | Designer | Topic | Contestant |
|---|---|---|---|
| Best National Costume to Miss Universe | Jorge Crespo | "Canal de Panamá" | Isy Rengifo |
| 1st runner-up | Hidalgo Candanedo | | Alejandra Perea |
| 2nd runner-up | Clinio García | | Sasha Carlton |

| Award | Contestant |
|---|---|
| Miss Congeniality | Gladys Espinosa |
| Chica L’Oreal | Gladys Espinosa |
| Miss Photogenic | Sasha Carlton |
| Chica Cover Girl | Sasha Carlton |
| Best Face | Anna Vaprio |
| Best Hair | Anna Vaprio |
| Best Skin | Delia Montenegro |
| Miss Internet | Nadya Henrick |
| Best Body | Debbie González |

=== Judges ===
- César Evora – actor
- Rodolfo Friedmann - singer
- Charlie Cuevas
- Rogelio González
- Lucy Romero
- Mónica Naranjo
- Carlos Magallón

== Contestants ==
These are the competitors who have been selected this year.

| Represent | Contestant | Age | Height (m) | Hometown |
|---|---|---|---|---|
| Panama | Anna Isabella Vaprio Medaglia | 21 | 1.78 | Panama City |
| Panama | Isy Denery Rengifo Saez | 22 | 1.76 | Panama City |
| Colón | Nadya Lya Hendricks Martínez | 20 | 1.68 | Colón |
| Panama | María Alessandra Mezquita | 21 | 1.80 | Panama City |
| Panama Oeste | Gladys Graciela Espinoza Solís | 24 | 1.70 | Chorrera |
| Panama | Debbie González Shaw | 23 | 1.65 | Panama City |
| Los Santos | Delia Montenegro | 21 | 1.73 | La Villa de los Santos |
| Panama | Sasha Carlton Arias | 20 | 1.71 | Panama City |
| Panama | Mayra Ibeth Matos Martínez | 19 | 1.76 | Panama City |
| Panama | Alejandra Perea Mejía | 22 | 1.73 | Medellín |
| Panama | Doris Achon | 21 | 1.66 | Panama City |
| Panama | Aliana Yaneth Khan Zambrano | 22 | 1.67 | Panama City |
| Panama | Noemí Cristina Cortés Fajardo | 20 | 1.67 | Panama City |
| Panama Este | Anais Mabel Velásquez Pérez | 24 | 1.78 | Panama City |
| Darién | Sorángel Matos Arce | 20 | 1.74 | Yaviza |

== Historical significance ==
- Panamá Centro placed in the final round for a consecutive year and won the title.

== Election schedule ==
- Tuesday July 20 final presentation to the press in the Hotel Radisson Decapolis.
- Thursday July 22 competition of interview with the juror.
- Friday 23 Final night, coronation Señorita Panamá to Miss World 2005 and Best National Competition.
- Saturday 24 Final night, coronation Señorita Panamá 2005.

== Candidates Notes ==
- Aliana Khan Zambano was Miss Earth Panamá 2001 and participated in the Miss Earth 2001 in University of the Philippines Theater in Quezon City, Philippines on October 28, 2001.
- Sorangel Matos Arce represented Panamá at Miss Universe 2007 in Mexico City.
- Debbie González was queen of the Panamá City Carnival 2004 and participated in Miss Hawaiian Tropic Panamá.
- Nadya Lya Hendricks represented Panamá in Miss Tourism Queen 2007.
