= Mayte Sánchez =

Panamanian model and beauty pageant titleholder

- Born: Mayte Sánchez González; Panama City, Panama
- Beauty pageant titleholder
- Title: Miss International Panamá 2006
- Hair color: Brunette
- Eye color: hazel
- Major competitions: Señorita Panamá 2004 (4th Runner-up), Miss International Panamá 2006 (Winner), Miss International 2006 (1st Runner-Up).

Mayte Sánchez González (born 1984) is a Panamanian model and beauty pageant titleholder. She was elected Miss Panama International 2006 and this gave her the opportunity to compete in the Miss International 2006 pageant which was held in China. Finally she was 1st Runner-Up and won the Best National Costume.

== Pageant participations ==
=== Señorita Panamá 2004 ===
In 2004, she participated in the Señorita Panamá 2004 where she placed as 4th Runner-up. The contest winner was Rosa María Hernández who participated in the Miss Universe 2005 (who in turn failed to enter the semifinals of Miss Universe 2005.

=== Miss International Panamá 2006 ===
In the 2004, she participated in the Miss International Panamá 2006 pageant, won the title, and was crowned by Lucía Matamoros.

Sánchez represented Panama in the Miss International 2006 in Tokyo, Japan & Beijing, China finals which was held on November 11, 2006, at Beijing Exhibition Centre, Beijing, China.

Awards and achievements
Preceded by Lucía Matamoros	Miss International Panamá; 2006	Succeeded by Stephanie Araúz Shaw
Preceded by (Dominican Republic) Yadira Geara Cury	Miss International 1st runner-up 2006	Succeeded by (Greece) Despoina Vlepaki
