= Señorita Panamá 2003 =

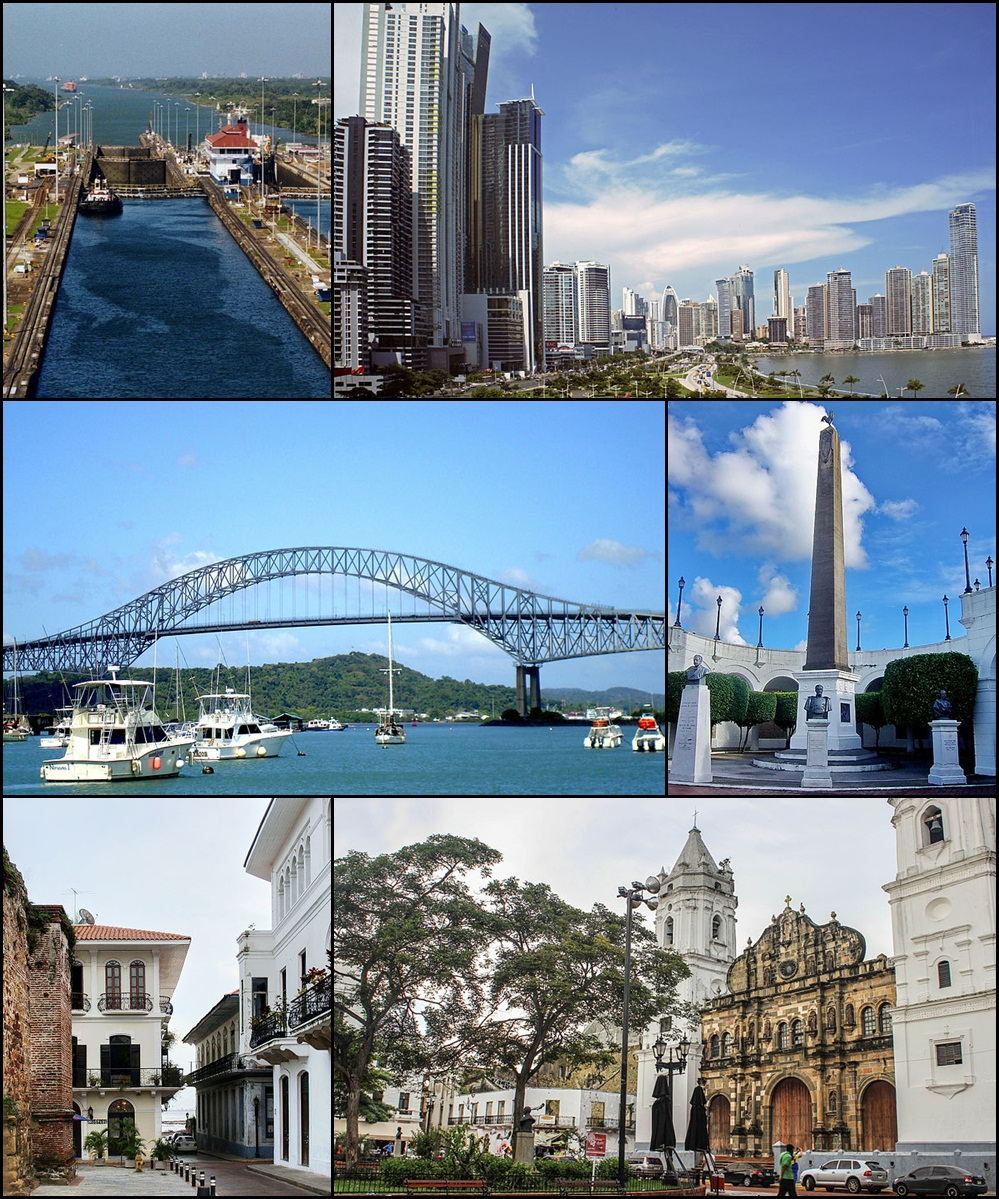
- Panama City host of Señorita Panamá 2003
- Date: November 26, 2003
- Presenters: Carlos Mastellari & Madelaine Legnadier
- Entertainment: Shalim & Iván Barrios
- Venue: Figali Convention Center, Panama City, Panama
- Broadcaster: RPC-TV
- Entrants: 11
- Placements: 5
- Winner: Jessica Rodríguez; Panamá Centro

Señorita Panamá 2003 was the 21st Señorita Panamá beauty pageant and 38th celebration of the Miss Panama contest. It held in the Figali Convention Center in Panama City, Panama, on November 26, 2003. After weeks of events, the winner was Jessica Rodríguez.

The pageant was broadcast live on RPC-TV. Eleven contestants competed for the title. At the end of the final night of competition, the outgoing titleholder Señorita Panamá 2002 Stefanie de Roux crowned Jessica Rodríguez of Panamá Centro as the new Señorita Panamá.

In the same night was celebrated the election of the "Señorita Panamá World", was announced the winner of the Señorita Panamá Mundo title. Señorita Panamá World 2002 Yoselín Sánchez Espino crowned Melissa Del Carmen Piedrahita of Panamá Centro as the new Señorita Panamá World.

Rodríguez competed in the 53rd edition of the Miss Universe pageant, held at the Centro de Convenciones CEMEXPO in Quito, Ecuador, on June 1, 2004. She won the award for best national costume. In other hands Piedrahita competed in Miss World 2004, the 54th edition of the Miss World pageant, was held on 4 December 2004 at the Crown of Beauty Theatre in Sanya, China.

== Results ==
=== Placements ===
Placement	Contestant
Señorita Panamá 2003	Panamá Centro – Jessica Rodríguez
Señorita Panamá World 2003	Panamá Centro – Melissa Piedrahita
1st Runner-Up	Panama City – Giselle Marie Bissot Kieswetter
2nd Runner-Up	Panama City – Marianina Tissera Puello
3rd Runner-Up	Panama City – Lilianne Thompson Franceschi

=== Special awards ===
Award	Designer	Topic	Contestant
Best National Costume to Miss Universe	Rogelio González	“Princesa Precolombina”	Marianina Tissera

Award	Contestant
Miss Congeniality	Fariba Hawkins Vasquez
Miss Photogenic	Gabriela Moreno Gonzalez

=== Judges ===
- Luis Lucho Ortega
- Fanny De Cardoze
- María Sofía Velázquez - Señorita Panamá 1993
- Kathia Vargas
- Rosario Rivera

== Contestants ==
The list of competitors was:

Represent	Contestant	Age	Height (m)	Home town
Panama City	Fariba Hawkins Vasquez	24	1.70	Panama City
Panama City	Lilianne Thompson Franceschi	18	1.70	Panama City
Panama City	Ana Karina Abrego Argudo	21	1.70	Panama City
Panama City	Melissa Del Carmen Piedrahita	21	1.75	Panama City
Panama City	Marianina Tissera Puello	20	1.80	Panama City
Panama City	Kimberly Barroso	22	1.74	Panama City
Panama City	Gabriela Moreno Gonzalez	21	1.70	Panama City
Panamá Oeste	Anabella Hale Ruiz	20	1.77	Chorrera
Panama City	Jessica Rodríguez	21	1.79	Panama City
Panama City	Giselle Marie Bissot Kieswetter	20	1.73	Panama City
Panama City	Lauren Johnson	18	1.73	Panama City

== Election schedule ==
- August 5 presentation to the press in the Hotel Continental
- Wednesday November 25 election Best National Costume
- Thursday November 26 Final night, coronation Señorita Panamá 2003

== Candidates notes ==
- Ana Karina Abrego won Miss Hawaiian Tropic Panamá 2006. She competed in the Treasure Island Hotel and Casino Theater Paradise, Nevada, on April 17, 2006.
- Gabriela Moreno Gonzalez is a recognized TV host.
- Anabella Hale Ruiz won Miss International Panamá 2004 and participated in Miss International 2004 in Beijing, China, on October 16, 2004. She was Unplaced.
- Giselle Bissot Kieswetter won the Señorita Panamá 2006 and participated in the Miss World 2006 in the Palace of Culture and Science in Warsaw, Poland, on September 30, 2006. She was in the top 25 semi-finalists of beach beauty.
- Lilianne Thompson Franceschi represented Panama in the Miss Intercontinental 2005 pageant and place in the Top 12 winning also the Miss Photogenic award.
- Melissa Del Carmen Piedrahita represented Panama in the Miss Continente Americano 2006 where she was (Top 6) and the Reinado Internacional del Café 2004 being the 3rd Runner-up.
- Fariba Hawkins was supposed competed in the Miss International 2001 but withdrew.
