= Anabella Hale =

Panamanian model (born 1983)

- Born: Anabella Isabel Hale Ruíz; 20 January 1983 (age 43); Panama City, Panama
- Height: 1.75 m (5 ft 9 in)
- Beauty pageant titleholder
- Title: Miss International Panamá 2004
- Hair color: Black
- Eye color: Black
- Major competitions: Señorita Panamá 2003, Miss International Panamá 2004 (Winner), Miss International 2004 (Unplace).

Anabella Isabel Hale Ruíz (born January 20, 1983) is a Panamanian model and beauty pageant titleholder. She was elected Miss Panamá international 2004; this gave her the opportunity to compete in the 44th Miss International 2004 pageant which was held at Workers Indoor Arena, Beijing, China on October 16, 2004.

Hale who was born in the United States also has Philippine ancestry, is 5 ft 8.5 in (1.74 m), competed in the national beauty pageant Miss International Panamá 2004 (1st edition), and obtained the title of Miss International Panamá. She represented Panamá Oeste Province.

== Pageant participations ==
=== Señorita Panamá 2003 ===
In 2003, she participated in the Señorita Panamá 2003 where she was unplaced contest winner for Jessica Rodríguez who participated in the Miss Universe 2004 (who in turn failed to enter the semifinals of Miss Universe 2004).

=== Miss Atlántico Internacional 2004 ===
On January 23, 2004, she represented Panama in the Miss Atlántico Internacional Beauty pageant and also won the Best national costume and the little Embajadora Internacional Mon-Por.

Awards and achievements
Preceded by Cristina Herrera; 2002	Miss International Panamá; 2004	Succeeded by Lucía Matamoros
Preceded by Iveth Del Carmen Valdes	Miss Atlántico Internacional Panamá; 2004	Succeeded by Berta Peric
