= Señorita Panamá 2004 =

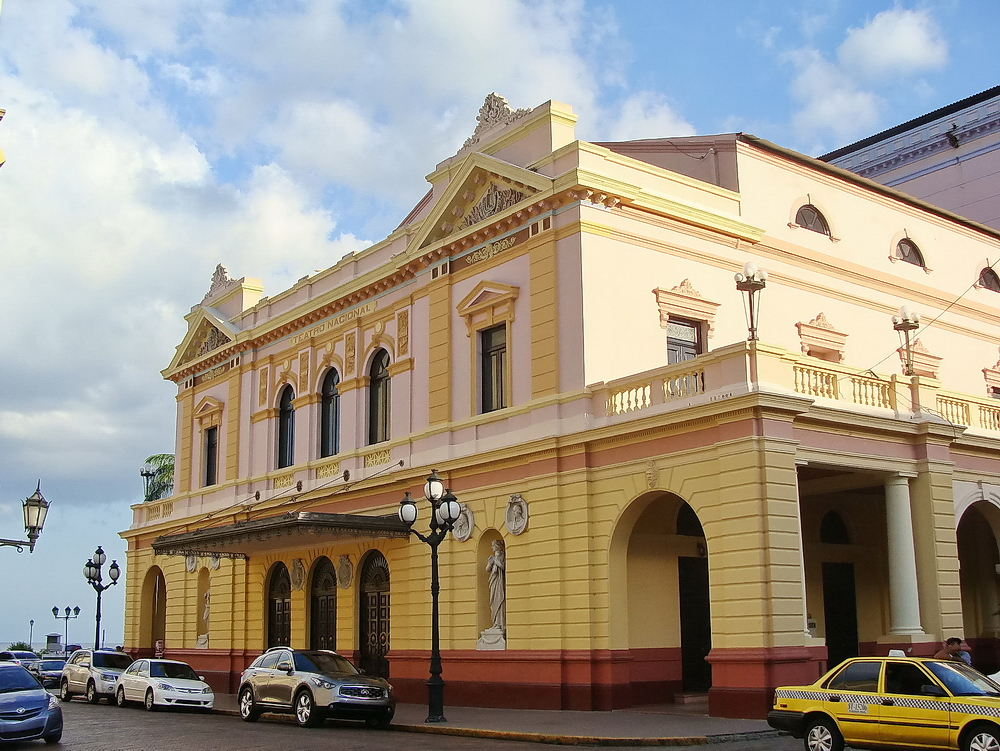
- National Theatre of Panama
- Date: September 11, 2004
- Presenters: Carlos Mastellari & Madelaine Legnadier
- Entertainment: Starship & Leo Almengor
- Venue: National Theatre of Panama, Panama City, Panama
- Broadcaster: RPC Televisión
- Entrants: 12
- Placements: 5
- Winner: Rosa María Hernández; Los Santos

Señorita Panamá 2004 was the 22nd Señorita Panamá pageant and 39th celebration of the Miss Panama contest. It was held in National Theatre of Panama in Panama City, Panama, on September 11, 2004, after weeks of events. The winner of the pageant was Rosa María Hernández.

The pageant was broadcast live on RPC Televisión. About 12 contestants from all over Panamá competed for the prestigious crown. At the conclusion of the final night of competition, outgoing titleholder Señorita Panamá 2003 Jessica Rodríguez crowned Rosa María Hernández of Los Santos as the new Señorita Panamá.

Hernández competed in the 54th edition of the Miss Universe 2005 pageant, at the Impact Arena, Bangkok, Thailand on May 31, 2005.

== Results ==
=== Placements ===
Placement	Contestant
Señorita Panamá 2004	Los Santos – Rosa María Hernández
1st Runner-Up	Coclé – Ana Isabel Ibáñez Carles
2nd Runner-Up	Panamá Centro – Rosmery Isabel Suárez
3rd Runner-Up	Panama City – Mercy Karina Correia Moreno
4th Runner-Up	Panama City – Maite Sanchez González

=== Special awards ===
Final results	Designer	Topic	Contestant
Best National Costume to Miss Universe	Jorge Crespo	"El Tesoro de Dabaibe"	Julianna Barriga

Award	Contestant
Miss Congeniality	Denys Rodríguez (Colón)
Miss Photogenic	Julianna Barriga (Panamá USA)
Miss Internet	Rosemary Suárez (Panama City)
Best Skin	Rosa María Hernández (Los Santos)

=== Judges ===
- Daniel Machado - photographer
- Catherine Correia - actress

== Contestants ==
These are the competitors who have been selected this year.

Represent	Contestant	Age	Height (m)	Hometown
Coclé	Ana Isabel Ibañez Perea	23	1.65	Penonome
Los Santos	Rosa María Hernández	21	1.67	Las Tablas
Panama City	Nadia Luisa Díaz Orbeño	22	1.67	Panama City
Colón	Yamira Julisa Lindsay Castaño	22	1.70	Colón
Panamá USA	Julianna Evelyn Barriga Campos	19	1.72	Miami
Panama City	Mercy Karina Correia Preciado	23	1.73	Panama City
Panama City	Maite Valentina Sanchez González	19	1.74	Panama City
Colón	Denys Anditha Rodríguez Cobo	22	1.75	Colón
Veraguas	Ingrid Mabelyn González de los Santos	20	1.74	Santiago de Veraguas
Chiriquí	Roselyz Renata Bolivar Hendicks	21	1.76	David
Chiriquí	Ingrid Laura Chang Valerio	21	1.78	David
Panama City	Rosemary Sandra Suarez Machazek	23	1.77	Panama City

== Election schedule ==
- Friday May 28 presentation to the press in the Hotel Radisson Decapolis
- Friday September 10, National Costume election.
- Thursday September 11 Final night, coronation Señorita Panamá 2004

== Candidates notes ==
- Mayte Sánchez González won Miss International Panamá 2006 and participate in the Miss International 2006 in Tokyo, Japan & Beijing, China finals was held on November 11, 2006, at Beijing Exhibition Centre, Beijing, China. She was the First Runner Up.
- Rosmery Isabel Suárez competed in Miss Earth 2005 in Quezon City, Philippines.
- Ingrid González was named Miss Panamá Earth 2004 but did not compete in Miss Earth 2004.
- Ana Isabel Ibáñez was Miss Hawaiian Tropic Panamá 2002.
- Mercy Correia participated in Miss Caraibes Hibiscus.
- Julianna Barriga competed in the Miss Florida Teen USA.
