= Miss Venezuela 2005 =

52nd edition of the Miss Venezuela competition

- Date: September 15, 2005
- Presenters: Daniel Sarcos; Maite Delgado
- Entertainment: Franco de Vita
- Venue: Poliedro de Caracas, Caracas, Venezuela
- Broadcaster: Venevision
- Entrants: 28
- Placements: 10
- Winner: Jictzad Viña; Sucre
- Photogenic: Rosamaria Matteo (Canaima)

Miss Venezuela 2005 was the 52nd Miss Venezuela pageant, held at the Poliedro de Caracas in Caracas, Venezuela, on September 15, 2005.

Mónica Spear crowned Jictzad Viña of Sucre as her successor at the end of the event.

== Results ==
=== Placements ===
Placement	Contestant
Miss Venezuela 2005	Sucre – Jictzad Viña
Miss Venezuela World 2005	Costa Oriental – Susan Carrizo
Miss Venezuela International 2005	Barinas – Daniela Di Giacomo
1st Runner-Up	Nueva Esparta – Alexandra Braun
2nd Runner-Up	Distrito Capital – Davianny Rivero
Top 10	Aragua – Marianne Puglia; Canaima – Rosamaría Matteo; Carabobo – Liliana Campa; Falcón – Andrea Pardo; Yaracuy – Adriana Echenagucia

=== Special awards ===
Award	State	Contestant
Miss Photogenic	Canaima	Rosamaria Matteo
Miss Internet	Aragua	Marianne Puglia
Miss Congeniality	Distrito Capital	Divianny Rivero
Miss Popularity	Carabobo	Liliana Campa
Miss Personality	Yaracuy	Adriana Echenagucia
Best Body	Canaima	Rosamaria Matteo
Miss Figure	Miranda	Zulima García
Best Hair	Bolívar	Samar Al Zarouni
Best Smile	Costa Oriental	Susan Carrizo
Best Face	Carabobo	Liliana Campa
Best Skin	Nueva Esparta	Alexandra Braun
Miss Elegance	Canaima	Rosamaria Matteo

== Contestants ==
The Miss Venezuela 2005 delegates are:

State	Contestant	Age	Height	Hometown
Amazonas	Carlen Catherina Farías Sandoval	20	177 cm (5 ft 9 1/2 in)	Caracas
Anzoátegui	Xenia Fabiola Prieto Mihajlow	20	177 cm (5 ft 9 1/2 in)	El Carmen
Apure	Krystle Carolina Kabbabé Poleo	22	178 cm (5 ft 10 in)	Caracas
Aragua	Marianne Pasqualina Puglia Martínez	20	176 cm (5 ft 9 1/2 in)	La Victoria
Barinas	Daniela Anette Di Giacomo Di Giovanni	20	176 cm (5 ft 9 1/2 in)	Caracas
Bolívar	Samar Al Zarouni El Hamra	19	176 cm (5 ft 9 1/2 in)	Valencia
Canaima	Rosamaria Matteo Mago	20	182 cm (5 ft 11 1/2 in)	Caracas
Carabobo	Liliana Campa Moerbeeck	21	183 cm (6 ft 0 in)	Maracay
Cojedes	Patricia Daniela Madrigal Tallavo	18	184 cm (6 ft 1/2 in)	Valencia
Costa Oriental	Berliz Susan Carrizo Escandela	21	177 cm (5 ft 9 1/2 in)	Cabimas
Delta Amacuro	Patricia Schmid Chávez	21	171 cm (5 ft 7 1/2 in)	Carrizal
Dependencias Federales	Sasha Andreína Bolívar Fraiz	21	172 cm (5 ft 7 1/2 in)	Chacao
Distrito Capital	Davianny Zayde Rivero Bello	20	172 cm (5 ft 7 1/2 in)	Caracas
Falcón	Andrea Pardo Aoun	19	177 cm (5 ft 9 1/2 in)	Baruta
Guárico	Lorena Alicia Sánchez de León Brajkovich	20	179 cm (5 ft 10 1/2 in)	Baruta
Lara	Jennifer Johanna Schell Dorante	20	179 cm (5 ft 10 1/2 in)	Barquisimeto
Mérida	Daniela Andreína Méndez Balza	24	174 cm (5 ft 8 1/2 in)	Caracas
Miranda	Zulima Zaira García Martínez	24	173 cm (5 ft 8 in)	Caracas
Monagas	Johanna Ruth Amorim Gaarn	18	179 cm (5 ft 10 1/2 in)	Caracas
Nueva Esparta	Alexandra Braun Waldeck	22	179 cm (5 ft 10 1/2 in)	Caracas
Península Goajira	Dominika van Santen Alix	22	172 cm (5 ft 7 1/2 in)	Maracaibo
Portuguesa	Ileana Beatriz Jiménez Maestre	24	173 cm (5 ft 8 in)	Maracaibo
Sucre	Jictzad Nakarhyt Viña Carreño	22	183 cm (6 ft 0 in)	Carúpano
Táchira	Denisse Josefina Mora Páez	18	178 cm (5 ft 10 in)	San Cristóbal
Trujillo	Angélika Sabrina Hernández Dorendorf	20	179 cm (5 ft 10 1/2 in)	Caracas
Vargas	Johanna del Valle Peñaloza Pérez	21	178 cm (5 ft 10 in)	Maiquetía
Yaracuy	Adriana Milagros Echenagucia Vallenilla	22	177 cm (5 ft 9 1/2 in)	Caracas
Zulia	Alejandra Pérez	20	174 cm (5 ft 8 1/2 in)	Maracaibo

Notes

- Jictzad Viña placed as 1st runner-up Reina Sudamericana 2005 in Santa Cruz, Bolivia.
- Susan Carrizo placed as semifinalist in Miss Italia Nel Mondo 2008 in Jesolo, Italy.
- Daniela Di Giacomo won Miss International 2006 in Beijing, China.
- Alexandra Braun won Miss Earth 2005 in Quezon City, Philippines.
- Dominika van Santen won Top Model of the World 2005 in Humen, China.
- Marianne Puglia placed as 3rd runner-up in Miss Earth 2006 in Manila, Philippines.
- Liliana Campa placed as 2nd runner-up in Reinado Internacional del Café 2006 in Manizales, Colombia.
- Jennifer Schell won the Reinado Mundial del Banano 2007 in Machala, Ecuador. She also won Miss Tourism of the Millennium 2007 in Addis Ababa, Ethiopia.
- Angélika Hernández Dorendorf competed in Miss Germany 2007.
