= La Bibliothèque de Madame Dai =

Restaurant/Museum

La Bibliothèque de Madame Dai was a restaurant and museum at 84A Nguyen Du Street in Ho Chi Minh City (Saigon), Vietnam. It was founded in April 1975, by Madame Nguyen Phuoc Dai, a retired lawyer and politician who converted her library into a restaurant. French President François Mitterrand ate at the restaurant in 1991.

The restaurant contained a museum featuring "pieces of Vietnamese ceramics, many temple sculptures from the pre-15th-century Cham Kingdom of Vietnam, a number of exquisite antique Chinese pieces, a large Cambodian temple rubbing, a Vietnamese screen and a large Japanese Imari ware platter". It is believed that the restaurant closed in the mid 2000s following the death of Madame Dai.
