= Daniela di Giacomo =

Venezuelan model, journalist, presenter, and beauty queen

- Di Giacomo at the 27th Annual Latin Grammy Awards, 2026
- Born: Daniela Anette di Giacomo di Giovanni; May 15, 1985 (age 41); Caracas, Venezuela
- Height: 1.76 m (5 ft 9 1/2 in)
- Spouse: Juan Ernesto Hidalgo (m. 2016)
- Beauty pageant titleholder
- Title: Miss Venezuela International 2005; Miss International 2006
- Hair color: Blonde
- Eye color: Green
- Major competitions: Miss Venezuela 2005 (Miss Venezuela International); Miss International 2006 (Winner) (Miss Best Style)

Daniela Anette di Giacomo di Giovanni (born May 15, 1985) is a Venezuelan tv host, journalist, radio host, model and beauty queen who was crowned Miss Venezuela International 2005 and then Miss International 2006 in China. She worked on Venezuelan channel Televen for a long time and now works for Univision in the United States.

Her victory in the 46th edition of Miss International, held in Beijing, China, earned Venezuela its fifth title in the pageant's history, making it the most successful country to date. She bested 51 other delegates to wear the pageant's newly unveiled crystal crown, rather than the traditional pearl crown.

Di Giacomo received as a prize a ¥3,000,000 check, a Maki Diamond tiara with 637 diamonds and a Tokuda Yasokichi III kutani blue ceramic trophy.

== Personal life ==
Di Giacomo is an Italo-Venezuelan personality who was born in Caracas. Standing at 5'9", her modeling career started in Paris and Milan at the age of 17. She attended Monteávila University in Caracas and is fluent in both Spanish and Italian.

== Pageant participations ==
Di Giacomo represented Barinas in the Miss Venezuela 2005 pageant, where she was crowned as Miss Venezuela International. She then went on to win Miss International 2006 in China.

Prior to winning Miss International, Di Giacomo competed in Miss World Coffee pageant in Guatemala, where she placed as a finalist and won the Miss Photogenic title.

On October 15, 2007, Di Giacomo crowned Priscila Perales of Mexico as Miss International 2007. The pageant was held in Tokyo, Japan.

Awards and achievements
Preceded by (Philippines) Lara Quigaman	Miss International; 2006	Succeeded by (Mexico) Priscila Perales
Preceded by (Caracas) Andrea Gómez	Miss Venezuela International; 2005	Succeeded by (Sucre, Venezuela) Vanessa Peretti
Preceded by Krysthen Kurman	Miss Barinas; 2005	Succeeded by Mabel Ramírez
