= María Alessandra Mezquita =

Panamanian model (born 1983)

- Born: María Alessandra Mezquita Lapadula; November 1, 1983 (age 42); Panama City, Panama
- Height: 1.80 m (5 ft 11 in)
- Beauty pageant titleholder
- Hair color: Brown
- Eye color: Green

María Alessandra Mezquita Lapadula (born November 1, 1983) is a Panamanian model and beauty pageant titleholder. She was the official representative of Panama in the 55th Miss Universe 2006 pageant, which was held at the Shrine Auditorium in Los Angeles, United States on July 23, 2006.

Mezquita, who is 5 ft 10 in (1.78 m) tall, competed in the national beauty pageant Señorita Panamá 2005, on September 24, 2005 and obtained the title of Señorita Panamá Universo. She represented Panamá Centro state.

Mezquita, who graduated with a degree in Mass Media Studies from Florida State University, which included a minor in Sports Management in May 2005, went on to work as a Sports Reporter for RPC Panamá where she covered events such as CONCACAF Gold Cup 2011, FIFA U20 World Cup Colombia 2011, London Olympic Games 2012, Final Draw for the 2014 FIFA World Cup Brazil, and World Cup Qualifiers for the Panamá National Team.

Awards and achievements
Preceded by Rosa María Hernández	Miss Panamá; 2005–2006	Succeeded by Giselle Bissot
Preceded by Rosa María Hernández	Panamanian delegate to Miss Universe; 2006	Succeeded by Sorangel Matos
