= Kutani ware =

Style of Japanese pottery

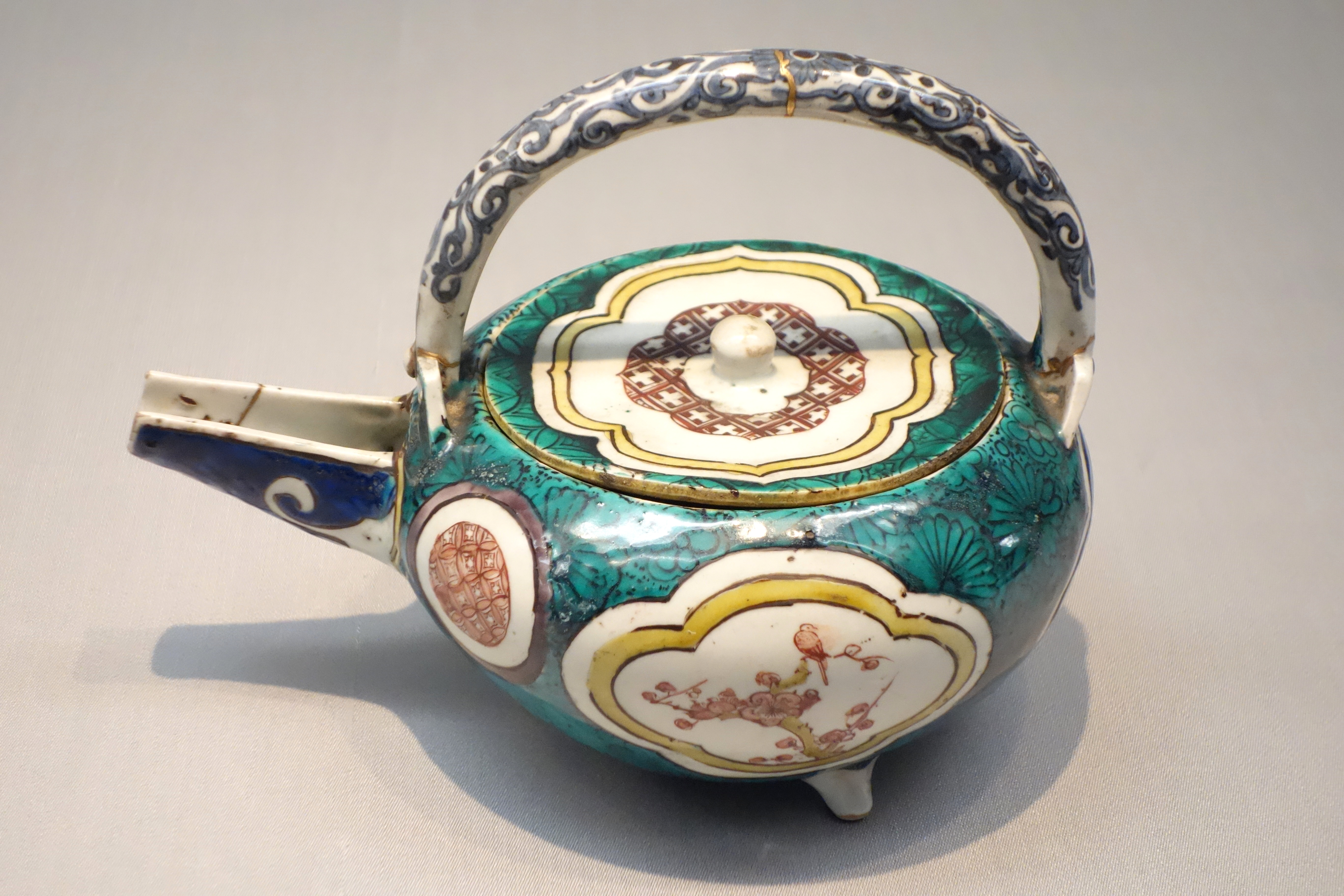
Ko-Kutani (old Kutani) five colours Iroe type sake ewer with bird and flower design in overglaze enamel, Edo period, 17th century

Kutani ware (九谷焼, Kutani-yaki) is a style of Japanese porcelain traditionally supposed to be from Kutani, now a part of Kaga, Ishikawa, in the former Kaga Province. It is divided into two phases: Ko-Kutani (old Kutani), from the 17th and early 18th centuries, and Saikō-Kutani from the revived production in the 19th century. The more prestigious Ko-Kutani wares are recognised by scholars to be a complex and much mis-represented group, very often not from Kutani at all.

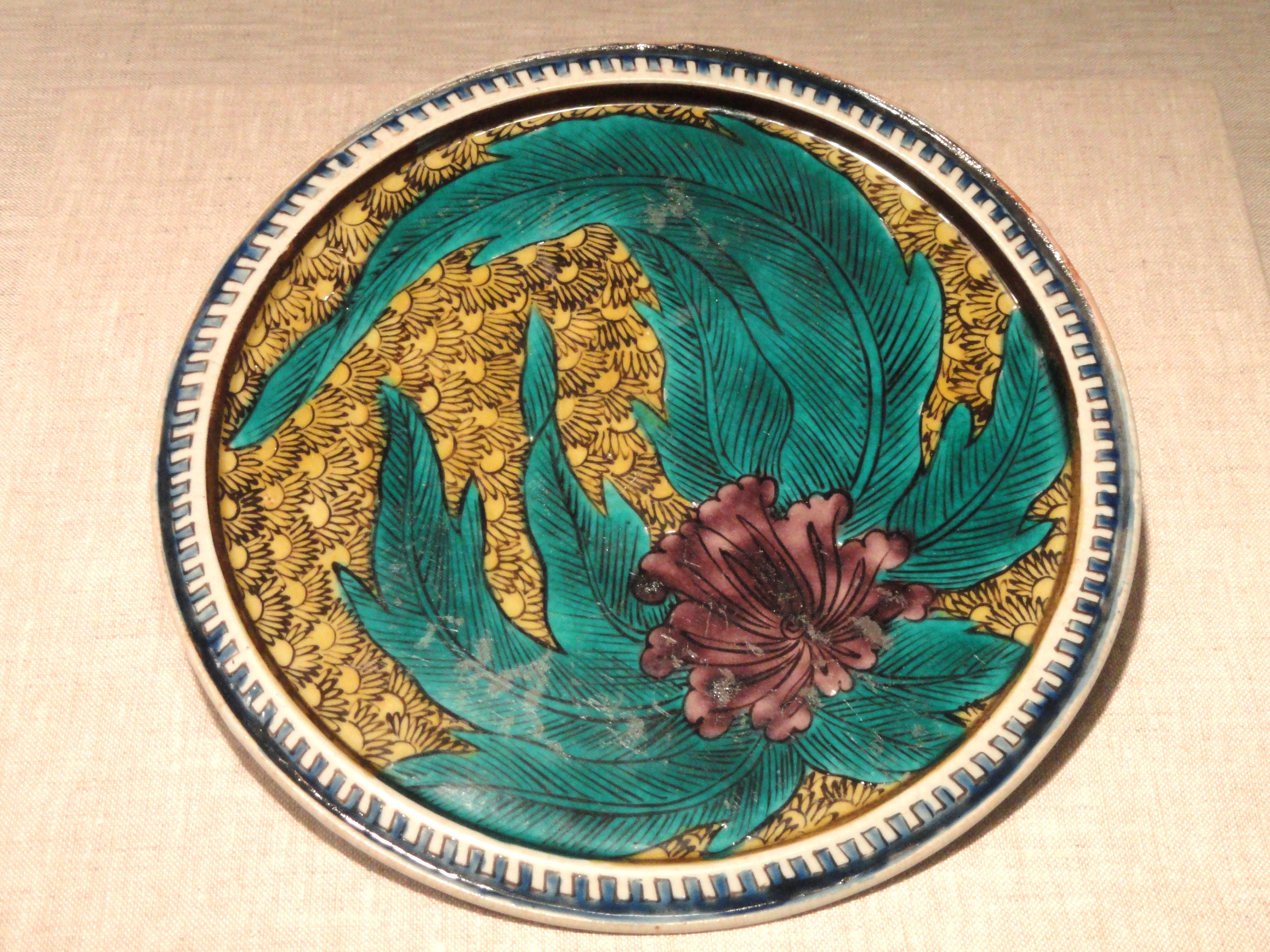
Ko-Kutani porcelain four colours Aote type plate with flower design in enamel, late 17th century, Edo period

Kutani ware, especially in the Ko-Kutani period, is marked by vivid dark colors that epitomize lavish aesthetics. It is theorized that the long, harsh and grey winters of the Hokuriku region led to a desire among people living there for ceramic ware to show strong and bold colours. The classical five colours style, known as gosai-de (五彩手), includes green, blue, yellow, purple, and red. The designs are bold and normally depict landscapes, the beauty of nature, and people, and cover most of the surface of each piece.

In recognition of the modern understanding that much, if not most, of the Ko-Kutani production was around Arita, the wares are now sometimes grouped with Imari ware (perhaps as "Ko-Kutani type"), or the wider groupings of Arita ware or Hizen ware.

== History ==
=== Ko-Kutani ===
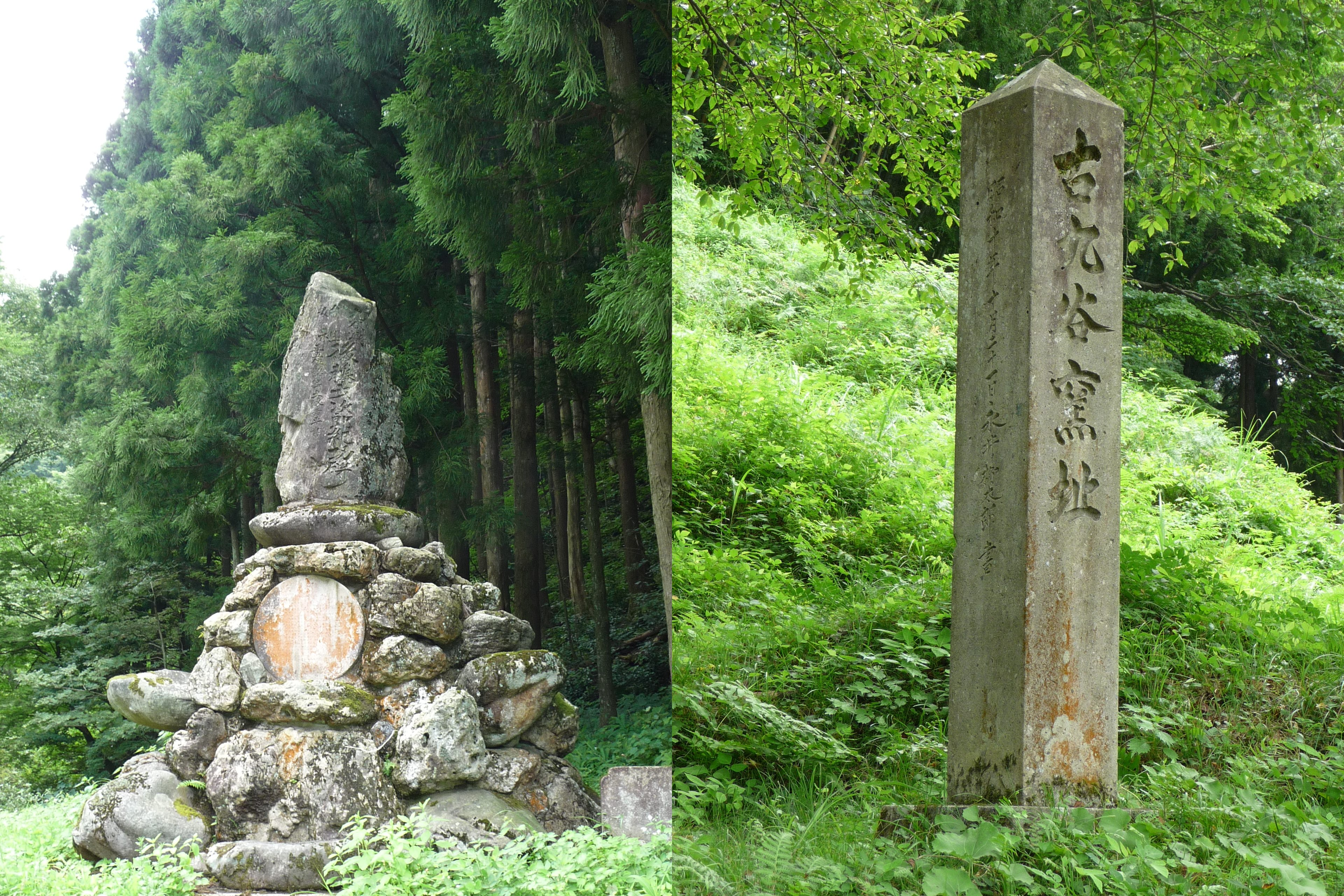
The site of old Kutani porcelain kiln (right), the memorial to the founder Gotō Saijirō (left)

The term kutani means "Nine Valleys". The first mention was in 1655 during the Meireki era. According to tradition, clays suitable for porcelain making were found in the Kutani mines of the Daishōji clan, a cadet branch of the Maeda clan who ruled Daishōji Domain. Gotō Saijirō, a member of the Maeda clan, was sent by orders of Maeda Toshiharu, daimyō of Kaga Domain to Arita in Hizen Province to learn how to make porcelain. He set up a kiln in the village of Kutani. The daimyō of Kaga Domain became great patrons of Kutani. Porcelains from this early period are specifically called old Kutani (古九谷, ko-Kutani) and are very rare.

Ko-Kutani enjoyed popularity for the next few decades after 1655. The styles of the old Kutani were Aote (青手), which used colours of deep green, yellow, dark blue and purple, and Iroe (色絵), which used red, green, purple, dark blue, and yellow. Arita however also produced a number of vessels in the ko-Kutani style, as well as Kakiemon porcelain.

Production suddenly closed down in 1730. The reasons for this closure are debated. Theories put forward include that supplies of the pigments necessary for the glazing were difficult to find, or that there were financial difficulties. A memorial stone stele to Gotō was later erected near an old Kutani ware kiln in Kaga.

=== Saikō-Kutani ===
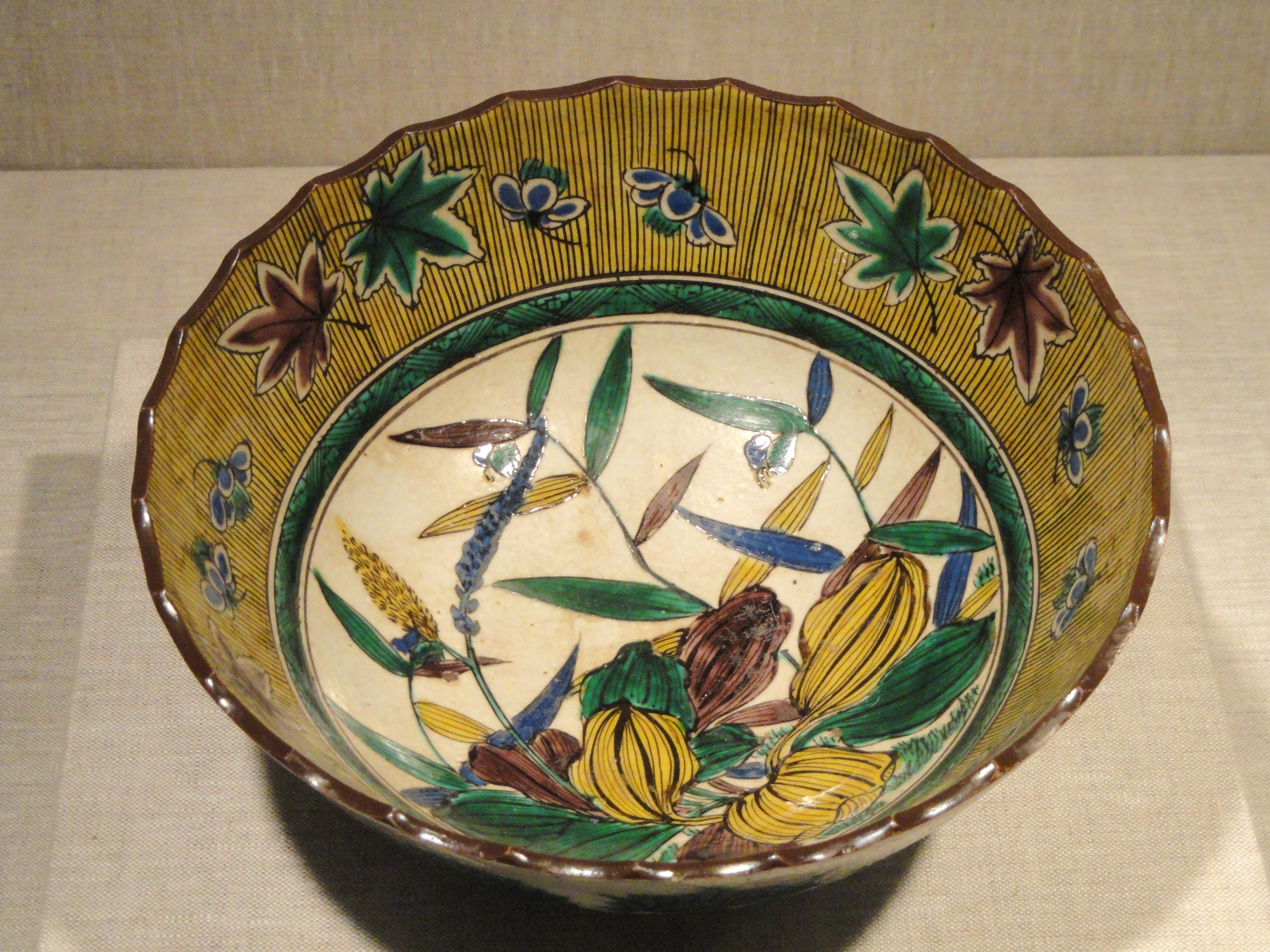
Saikō-Kutani style porcelain sweets tray with underglaze flower and leaves decoration and overglaze enamels, c. 1825, late Edo period

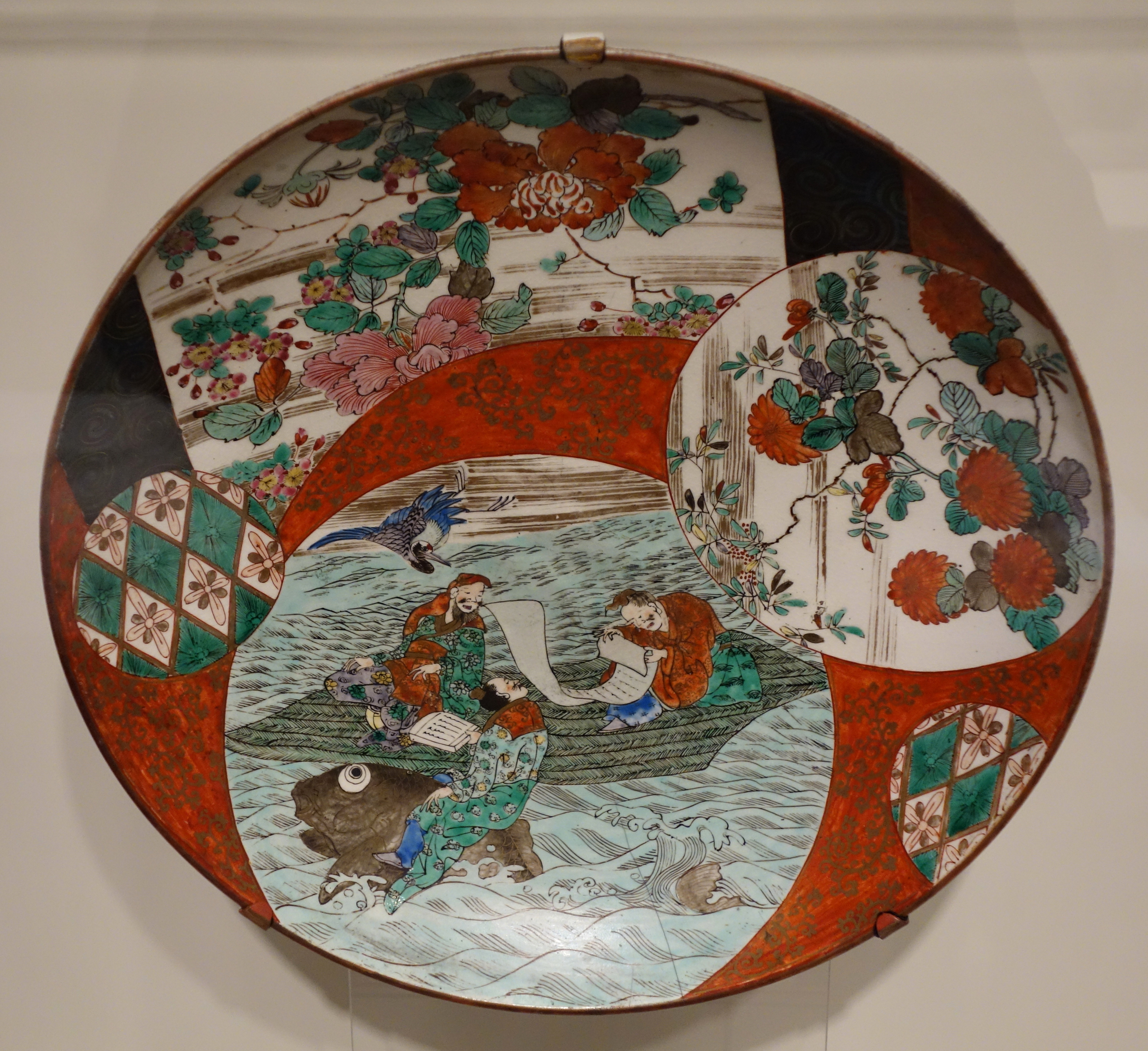
Saikō-Kutani porcelain plate depicting Li Bo riding a carp, 19th century, Edo period

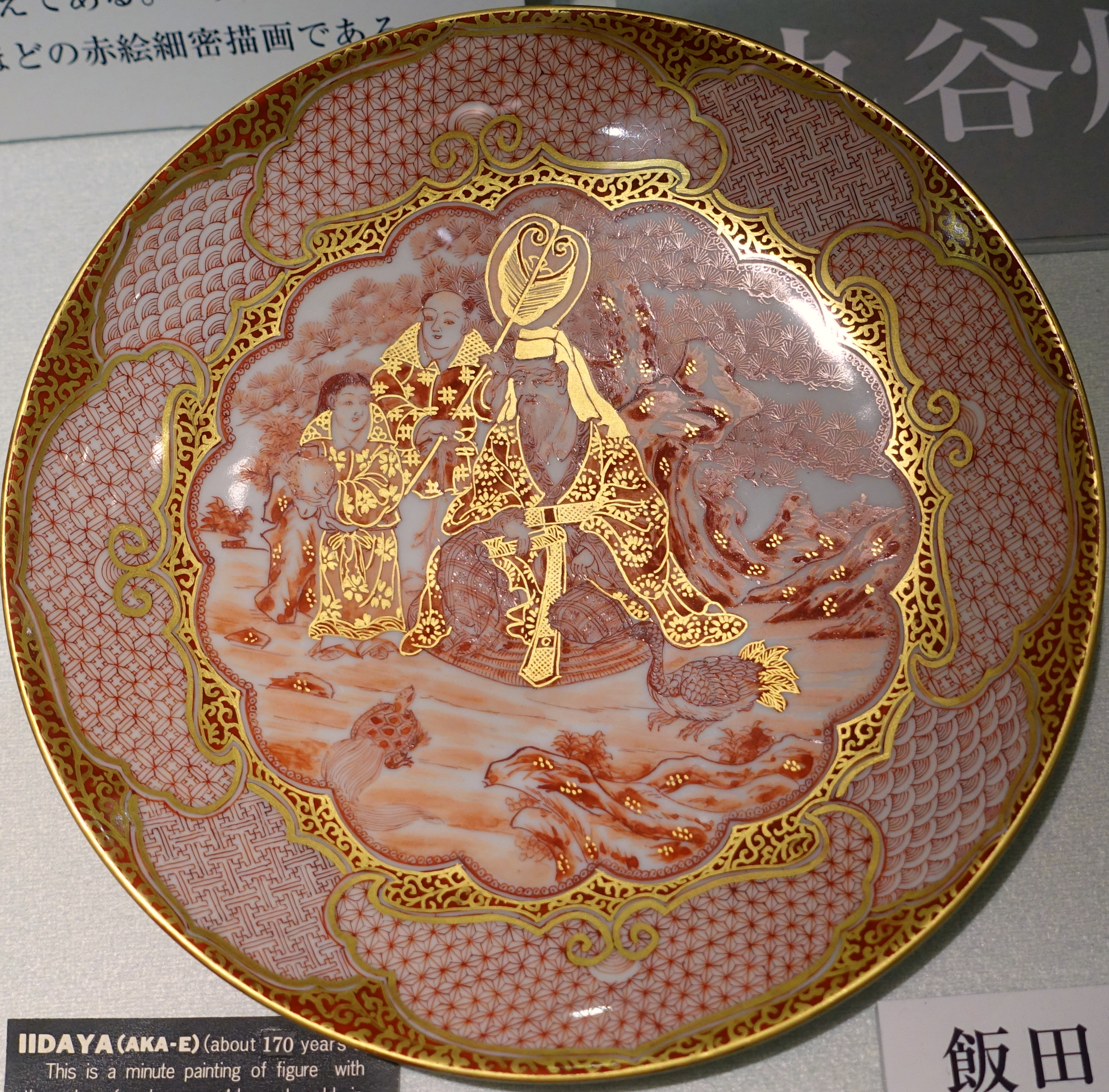
Iidaya style plate

In 1804, or possibly 1807, production was re-established with the help of several kamamoto, or production potters. New overglaze painting techniques from various kamamoto were infused in the development of what became known as revived Kutani (再興九谷, Saikō-Kutani). In the 19th century the style shifted to a more red design called aka-e (赤絵), which features intricate designs. The gold technique is called kinran-de (金襴手), and the combination became aka-e kinran-de (赤絵 金襴手) Kutani.

One of the first important exhibitions abroad was in 1873 at the Vienna World Exposition, where kinran-de was exhibited. This helped spread its popularity and contributed to the growth of exports to Europe. The style of producing Kutani was named a traditional craft in 1975. There are now several hundred companies which produce Kutani ware.

Many artists today are located in Komatsu, Ishikawa and Terai. Well-known artists are Tatsuya Mitsui, Buzan Fukushima (who specialises in aka-e), Takayama Kazuo (b. 1947) and Akaji Ken (b. in 1938) who work in the traditional style, and Tojiro Kitade and Fujio Kitade who work in the modern movement. Tokuda Yasokichi III (1933–2009) was designated a Living National Treasure for his enamel work in ao-de ko-Kutani. Yoshida Minori (b. 1932) is a third generation master who specialises in the yūri-kinsai technique and was also designated a Living National Treasure. Asakura Isokichi II (1913–1998) was also renowned and received the Order of Culture in 1996.

Apart from traditional vessels such chawan, Kutani artists have branched out in recent times to produce items such as a sneaker made out of porcelain with lively colours and accessories such as USB flash drives.

== Characteristics ==
Six different over-glazing techniques dominate the revised form of Kutani:

- Mokubei style, influenced by Chinese ink painting techniques
- Yoshidaya style, marked by the colours of green, yellow, purple and dark blue as the basis
- Eiraku style, which is in contrast to the Yoshidaya style, with its simplistic coatings of gold on the first coat of red colour
- Iidaya style, or the Hachirode, which breaks away from the conventional nature-themed Kutani style, with minute paintings of human figures on a red-gold aka-e kinran-de mix background
- Shoza style, a blend of all four techniques of overglazing

In a normal production process the artisan receives a plain white ceramic piece. The artisan will paint a komon (小紋) fine pattern, which is also shown on kimono. The outlines are painted with zaffre, which consists of cobalt oxide. The vessel is then fired in the kiln, which turns the zaffre dark. It takes around seven hours to finish. The surface is then covered again in regular intervals. For the patterns and decoration, for example, the five colours called gosai-de made out of vitreous enamel are painted on the vessel with thick strokes, making the whole piece more three-dimensional in the end. The ratio used in each glaze determines the specific tones of the colours. The vessel is then fired again in the kiln at 800 °C (1,470 °F). The chemical reaction due to the heat turns the pigment into the translucent colours desired by the artisan. The paint changes into a transparent glass and the fine komon design gives it depth.

=== Fine calligraphy ===
A unique feature of Kutani ware is the application of fine calligraphy called saiji (細字), which is miniature in size. The founder of this art is considered to be Oda Seizan (小田清山), who first pioneered this form in the early Meiji era. He wrote classical Chinese poems inside tea and sake cups with the thinnest brushes. By 1900 he also started writing in Japanese characters. Among his accomplishments were writing all the poems of the Ogura Hyakunin Isshu inside a Western-style cup three centimetres in diameter, and 500 waka poems of the Meiji Emperor inside a Japanese teacup. His son-in-law Tamura Kinsei continued the craft and passed it on to his grandson Tamura Keisei 田村敬星 (b. 1949), who continues the art. He writes the calligraphy also on the outside of vessels such as incense burners. In 2005, he was designated an Intangible Cultural Property by the Ishikawa Prefecture government.

== Site of the Kutani kilns ==
The site of the original Kutani kilns is now an archaeological site, and was designated a National Historic Site of Japan in 1979. An excavation survey was conducted by the Ishikawa Prefecture Board of Education from 1955, and found two continuous-cell noborigama step kilns on the right bank of the Daishoji River. The first kiln consisted of a combustion chamber and a series of 13 burning chambers extending up a hillside, with a horizontal length of 33.4 meters from the lower combustion chamber to the flue at the upper end, and a height of 10.75 meters. The firing chamber consists of a sand bed with a back wall of bricks. The second kiln is located 15 meters south, and has a total length of 13.02 meters. Although on a smaller scale, the mouth and flue portions were well preserved. The site also contains a third "Yoshiyada style" kiln with a length of 16 meters, dating from the end of the Edo period. In addition to the kilns themselves, the site of a workshop for mixing pigments and a site for purification of clay materials, and a studio site have also been identified. Numerous shards of porcelain were recovered, indicating the predominance of white porcelain and celadon. Currently, the site is backfilled for preservation.

== See also ==
- List of Historic Sites of Japan (Ishikawa)
- Tokuda Yasokichi III for Saiyu glazed kutani ware
- List of Traditional Crafts of Japan
