= Sorangel Matos =

- Born: Sorangel Matos Arce; January 2, 1986 (age 40); Panama City, Panama
- Height: 1.76 m (5 ft 9 in)
- Beauty pageant titleholder
- Title: Señorita Panama Universe 2007
- Hair color: Brown
- Eye color: Hazel
- Major competitions: Señorita Panamá 2006 (1st Runner-Up); Miss Universe 2007 (Unplaced)

Sorangel Matos Arce (born January 2, 1986) is a Panamenian beauty pageant titleholder. She was the official representative of Panama to the Miss Universe 2007 pageant, held in Mexico City, Mexico on May 28, 2007;.

== Pageant participation ==
In 2006, Matos represented Panama at the Miss Tourism Queen International Pageant in Shanghai, China. Matos then competed in the national beauty pageant Señorita Panamá 2006, representing the Darién Province. On March 19, 2007, she was designated the Miss Panama 2007, becoming the first woman from Darién to win the title.

In 2007, Matos attended Reina Del Carnaval De Panama. In 2007, Matos represented Panama at the Miss Continentes Unidos Pageant in Guayaquil, Ecuador.

== Personal life ==
Matos speaks Spanish, English, Italian and Portuguese.

Awards and achievements
Preceded by Giselle Bissot	Miss Panama; 2007	Succeeded by Carolina Dementiev
Preceded by María Alessandra Mezquita	Panamanian delegate to Miss Universe; 2007	Succeeded by Carolina Dementiev
