= Señorita Panamá 2006 =

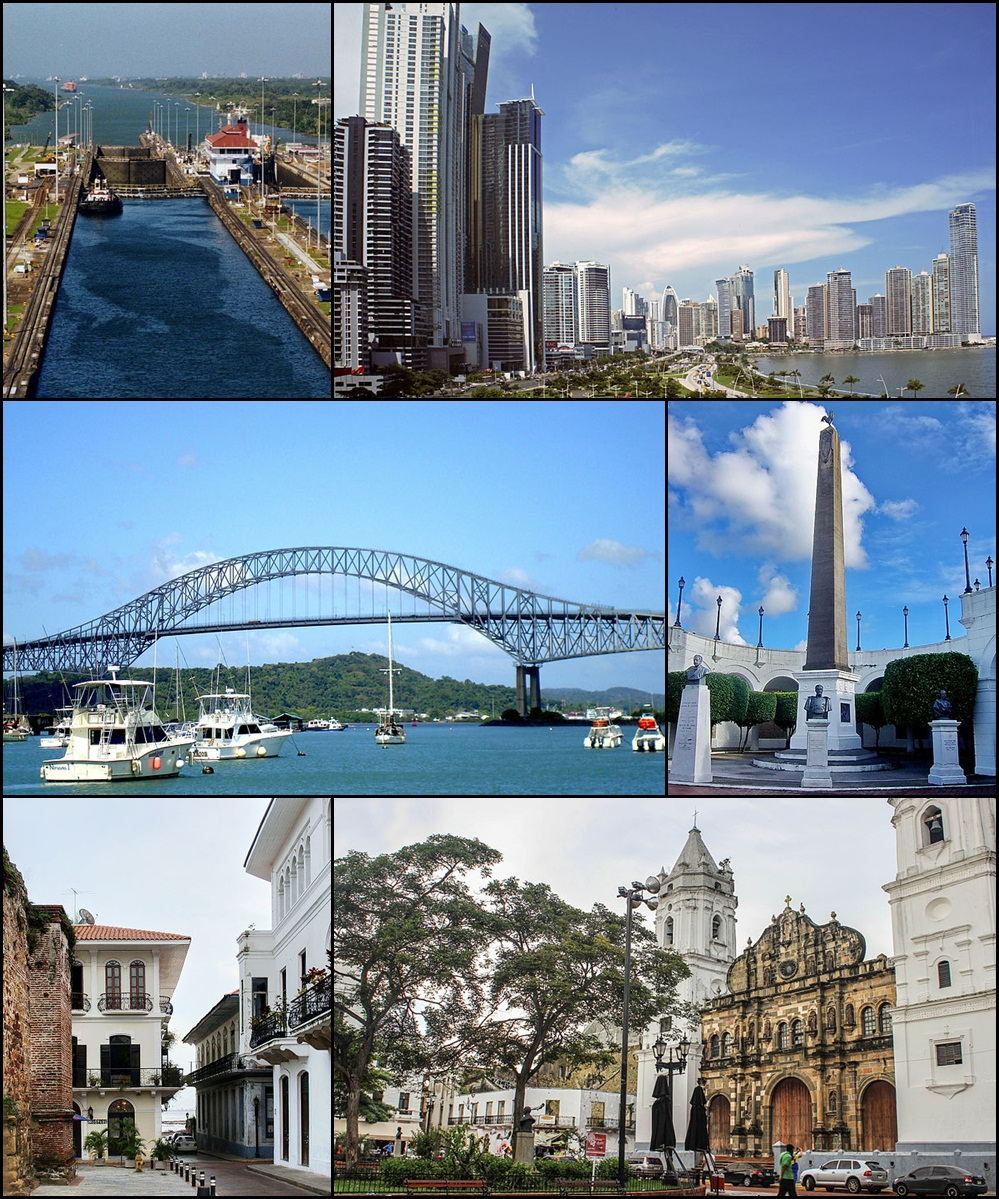
- Panama City host of Señorita Panamá 2006
- Date: July 15, 2006
- Presenters: Carlos Mastellari & Madelaine Legnadier
- Entertainment: Paul Larrinaga & boys of Mr. Panamá 2006
- Venue: Gran Salón del Hotel & Casino Venetto, Ciudad de Panamá, Panama
- Broadcaster: RPC Panama
- Entrants: 9
- Placements: 2
- Winner: Giselle Bissot; Panamá Centro

Señorita Panamá 2006 the 24th Annual Señorita Panamá pageant and 41st celebration of the Miss Panama contest, was held in the Gran Salón del Hotel & Casino Venetto, Panama City, Panama Wednesday 15, July 2006.

About 9 contestants from all over Panamá competed for the prestigious crown. Señorita Panamá World 2005, Anna Vaprio Medaglia of Panamá Centro crowned to Giselle Bissot of Panamá Centro as the new Señorita Panamá. This year the final only selected Señorita Panamá for Miss World.

The requirements of selection of the competitors for this year were: to be a model and have experience in beauty contests, since it needed to be a woman who was already prepared in advance. Contestants had taken part in: Miss Panama, Miss Hawaiian Tropic Panamá and Miss International Panama.

Bissot competed in the 56th edition of the Miss World 2006 pageant, was held at the Palace of Culture and Science in, Warsaw, Poland on September 30, 2006. Bissot declined her participation in Miss Universe due to her studies. Matos competed in the 56th Miss Universe pageant, held on 28 May 2007 at the National Auditorium in Mexico City, Mexico.

== Results ==
=== Placements ===
Placement	Contestant
Señorita Panamá 2006	Panamá Centro – Giselle Bissot
1st Runner-Up	Darién – Sorangel Matos

=== Special awards ===
Award	Contestant
Chica Cover Girl	Nadia Díaz
Best Hair	Giselle Bissot

=== Others special awards ===
Award	Contestant
Miss Bikini Shop	Giselle Bissot

== Contestants ==
These are the competitors who have been selected this year.

Represent	Contestant	Age	Height (m)	Hometown	Agency
Panamá	Hercilia Rivera	23	-	Panama City	Panamá Talents
Los Santos	Irina Pardo	-	-	Las Tablas	Panamá Talents
Darién	Sorángel Matos Arce	20	1.74	Yaviza	Panamá Talents
Panamá Centro	Giselle Bissot	23	1.74	Panama City	Physical
Panamá	Lilianne Thompson	21	1.70	Panama City	Panamá Talents
Panamá	Kelly Mata	23	-	Panama City	Panamá Talents
Panamá	Nadia Luisa Díaz	24	1.67	Panama City	Tania Hyman’s Models & Talents
Panamá Este	Anais Mabel Velásquez Pérez	25	1.78	Panama City	Tania Hyman’s Models & Talents
Panamá	Anaida González	19	-	Panama City	Tania Hyman’s Models & Talents

== Historical significance ==
- Panamá Centro placed in the final round for consecutive year and won the title Miss World Panamá.

== Election schedule ==
- Friday July 10 final presentation to the press in the Hotel Radisson Decapolis.
- Tuesday July 14 competition of interview with the juror.
- Wednesday 23 Final night, coronation Señorita Panamá to Miss World 2006

== Candidates Notes ==
- Giselle Bissot In 1998 it took part Chica & Chico Modelo. In 2003 stayed of the first finalist in Señorita Panamá. In 2005 it went to Miss Asia Pacificic International in China, Also it took part in the Miss Mesoamérica, which was realized in Houston, where it occupied the fourth place.
- Sorangel Matos Arce represent Panamá in Miss Universe 2007 in Mexico City.
