= Imari ware =

Type of Japanese porcelain ware

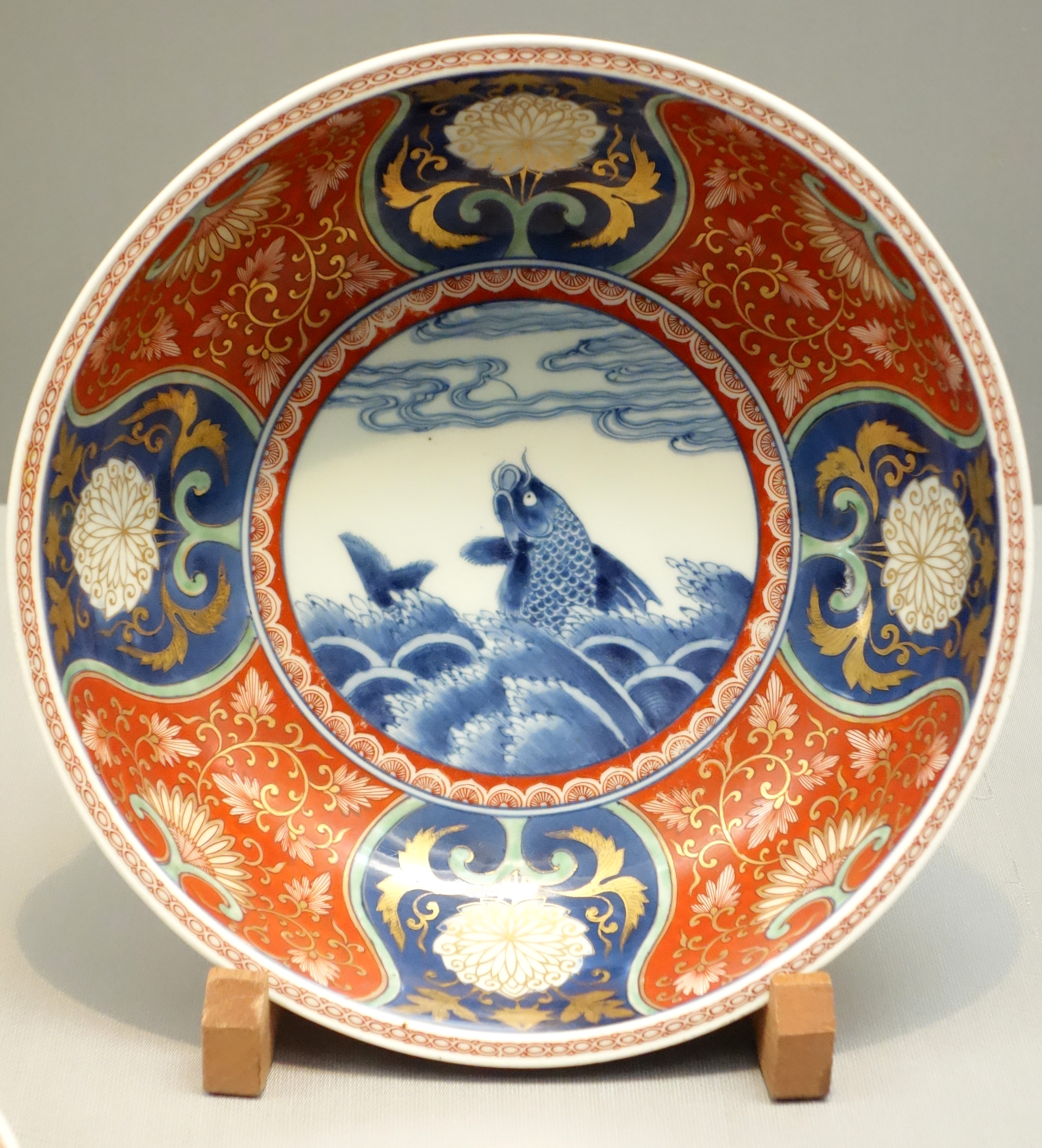
Imari ware bowl, stormy seascape design in overglaze enamel, Edo period, 17th–18th century

Imari ware (Japanese: 伊万里焼, Hepburn: Imari-yaki) is a Western term for a brightly-coloured style of Arita ware (有田焼, Arita-yaki) Japanese export porcelain made in the area of Arita, in the former Hizen Province, northwestern Kyūshū. They were exported to Europe in large quantities, especially between the second half of the 17th century and the first half of the 18th century.

Typically Imari ware (in the English use of the term) is decorated in underglaze blue, with red, gold, black for outlines, and sometimes other colours, added in overglaze. In the most characteristic floral designs most of the surface is coloured, with "a tendency to overdecoration that leads to fussiness". The style was so successful that Chinese and European producers began to copy it. Sometimes the different overglaze styles of kakiemon and Kutani ware are also grouped under Imari ware.

The name derives from the port of Imari, Saga, from which they were shipped to Nagasaki, where the Dutch East India Company and the Chinese had trading outposts. In the West the multi-coloured or "enamelled" wares became known as "Imari ware", and a different group kakiemon, while blue and white wares were called "Arita ware"; in fact the types were often produced at the same kilns. Today, the use of "Imari" as a descriptor has declined, and they are often called Arita wares (or Hizen wares, after the old province). Imari ware was copied in both China and Europe, and has been continuously produced to the present day.

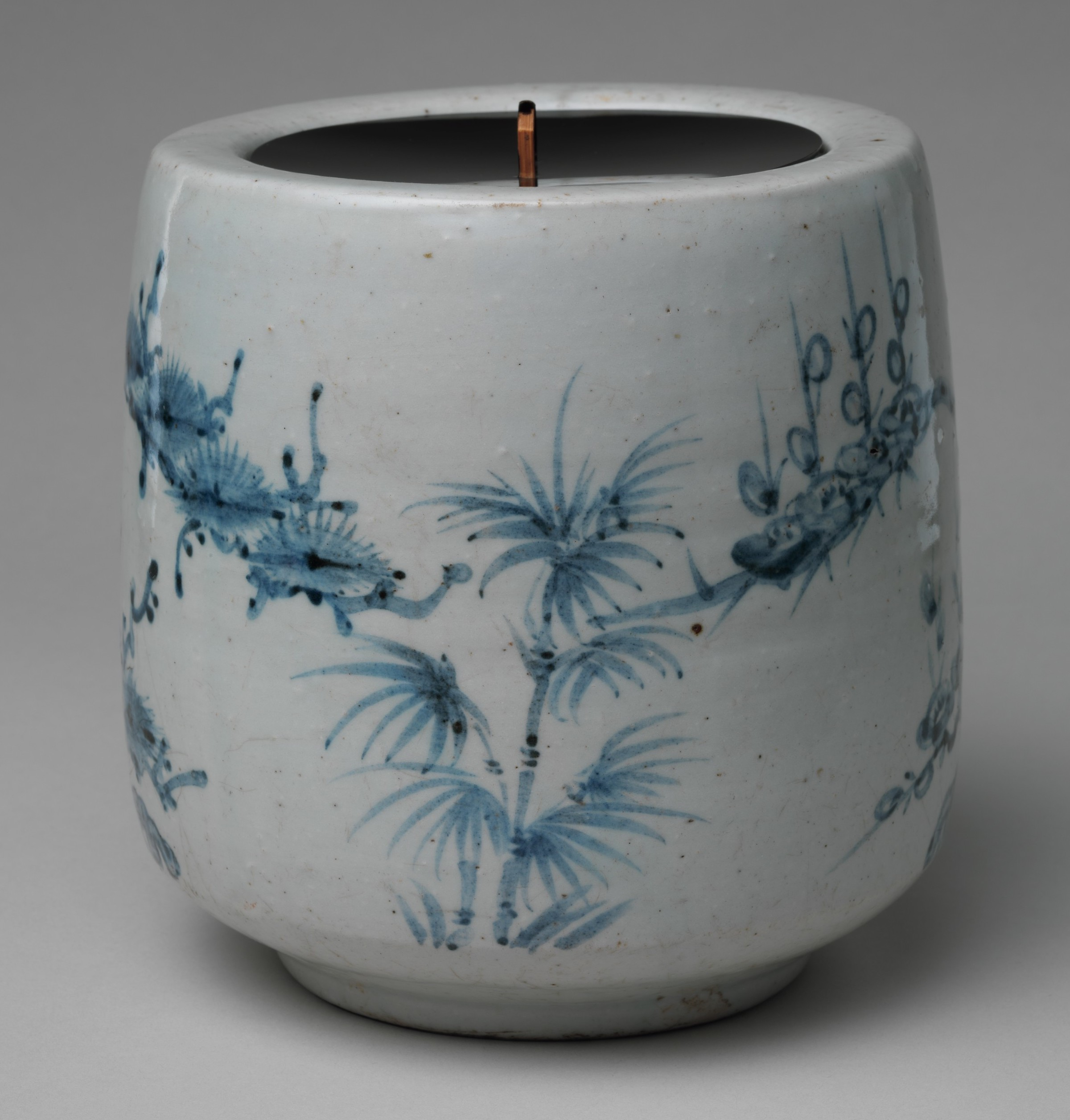
"Early Imari" water jar, 1630s

"Early Imari" (shoki imari) is a traditional and somewhat confusing term used for very different wares that were made around Arita before about 1650. The porcelains are generally small and sparsely painted in underglaze blue for the domestic market, but there are also some large green celadon dishes, apparently made for the southeast Asian market, in a porcellaneous stoneware.

== History ==
"Imari" was simply the trans-shipment port for Arita wares, from where they went to the foreign trading outposts at Nagasaki. It was the kilns at Arita which formed the heart of the Japanese porcelain industry.

Arita's kilns were set up in the 17th century, after kaolin was discovered in 1616 by Korean potter, Yi Sam-pyeong (1579–1655), who was abducted along with other Korean potters from the Korean peninsula during the Keicho Period War by the Lord of the Saga domain. After the discovery, some kilns began to produce revised Korean-style blue and white porcelains, known as Early Imari, or "Shoki-Imari".

In the mid-17th century there were also many Chinese refugees in northern Kyushu due to the turmoil in China, and it is said that one of them brought the overglaze enamel coloring technique to Arita. Thus Shoki-Imari developed into Ko-Kutani, Imari, and later Kakiemon, which are sometimes taken as a wider group of Imari wares. Ko-Kutani was produced around 1650 for both export and domestic market. Kutani ware is characterized by vivid green, blue, purple, yellow and red colors in bold designs of landscapes and nature. Blue and white porcelain pieces continued to be produced and they are called Ai-Kutani. Ko-Kutani Imari for the export market usually adopted Chinese design structure such as kraak style, whereas Ai-Kutani for the domestic market were highly unique in design and are accordingly valued very much among collectors.

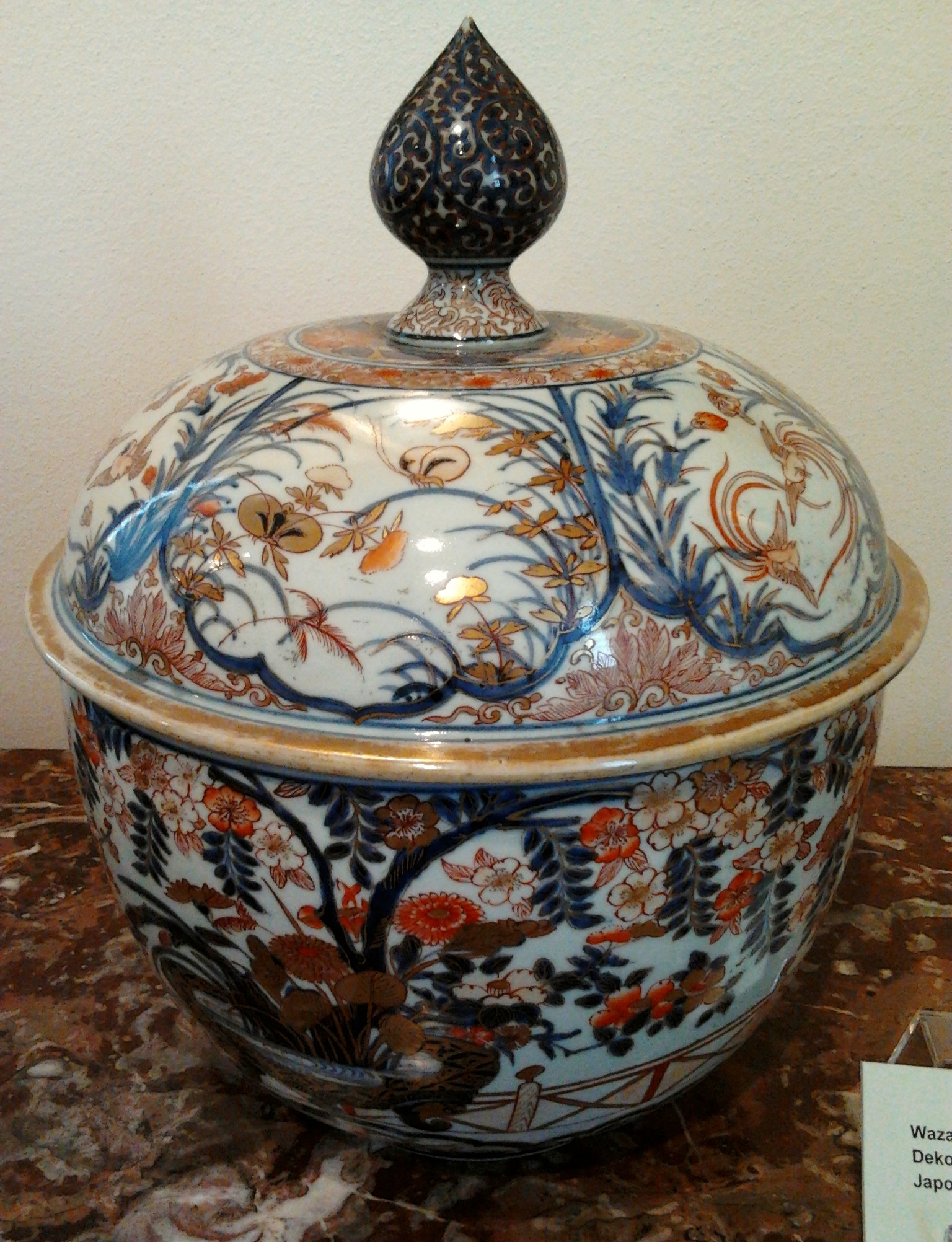
18th-century Imari covered tureen in the District Museum, Tarnów; an example of export porcelain collected by Polish–Lithuanian Commonwealth's magnateria

Ko-Kutani style evolved into Kakiemon-style Imari, which was produced for about 50 years around 1700. Kakiemon was characterized by crisp lines, and bright blue, red and green designs of dramatically stylized floral and bird scenes. Imari achieved its technical and aesthetic peak in the Kakiemon style, and it dominated the European market. Blue and white Kakiemon is called Ai-Kakiemon. The Kakiemon style transformed into Kinrande in the 18th century, using underglaze blue and overglaze red and gold enamels, and later additional colors.

Imari began to be exported to Europe when the Chinese kilns at Jingdezhen were damaged in the political chaos and the new Qing dynasty government halted trade in 1656–1684. Exports to Europe were made through the Dutch East India Company, and in Europe the designation "Imari porcelain" connotes Arita wares of mostly Kinrande Imari.

Export of Imari to Europe stopped in mid-18th century when China resumed export to Europe, since Imari was not able to compete against Chinese products due to high labor costs. By that time, however, both Imari and Kakiemon styles were already so popular among Europeans that the Chinese export porcelain copied both, a type known as Chinese Imari. At the same time, European kilns, such as Meissen and English potteries such as Johnson Bros. and (Royal) Crown Derby, also imitated the Imari and Kakiemon styles.

Export of Imari surged again in late 19th century (Meiji era) when Japonism flourished in Europe. Thus in the western world today, two kinds of true Japanese Imari can be found: that exported in the mid-Edo period, and that exported in the Meiji era. From the viewpoint of collectors, these two types are completely different, though Kinrande appearances are similar.

== Characteristics ==
Though there are many types of Imari ware, the type usually so called in the West is called kinrande in Japanese, and was produced for export in large quantities from the mid-17th century until the export trade tailed off around 1740. Kinrande has underglaze cobalt blue and overglaze red and gold, and sometimes other colors. The color combination was not seen in China at that time. Traditional Ming dynasty color porcelain used dominantly red and green, probably due to scarcity of gold in China, whereas gold was abundant in Japan in those days.

The subject matter of Arita is diverse, ranging from foliage and flowers to people, scenery and abstractions. Some designs such as Kraak porcelain were adopted from China, but most designs were uniquely Japanese owing to the rich Japanese tradition of paintings and costume design. The porcelain has a gritty texture on the base, where it is not covered by glaze.

=== Chinese Imari ===
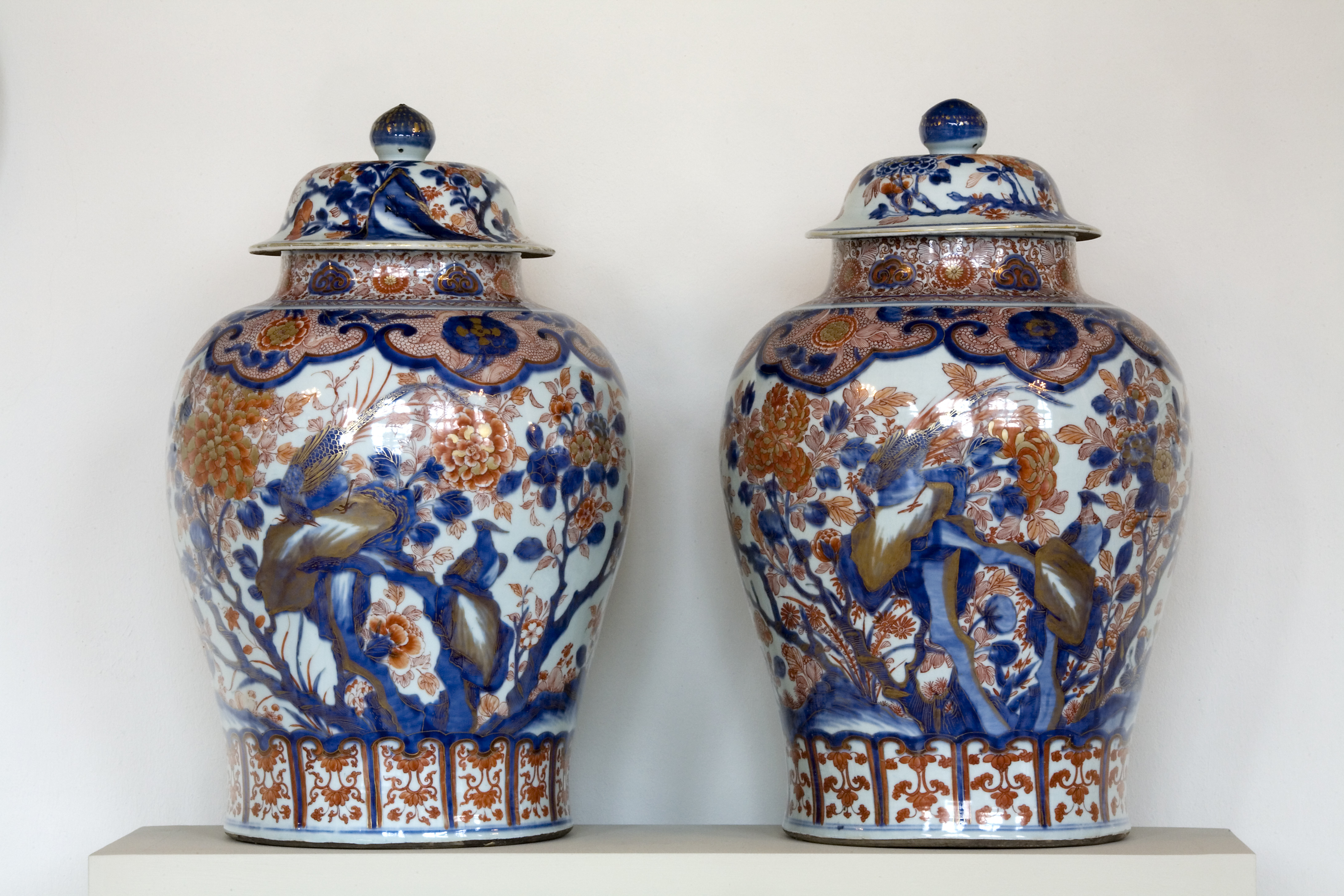
Chinese Imari porcelain vases of the Kangxi period (1662–1722), Qing dynasty

Though sophisticated wares in authentic Japanese styles were being made at Arita for the fastidious home market, European–style designations of Arita porcelain were formed after blue and white kraak porcelains, imitating Chinese underglaze "blue-and-white" wares, or made use of enamel colors over underglazes of cobalt blue and iron red. The ware often used copious gilding, sometimes with spare isolated sprigged vignettes, but often densely patterned in compartments. There were two quite different styles in these wares. Globular Imari teapots with swan-necked spouts helped establish the classic European form for these new necessities of life.

Dutch traders had a monopoly on the insatiable export trade, the first large order being placed at Arita by the Dutch East India Company in 1656. The trade peaked in the late 17th century and was slowly replaced by Chinese kilns in the early 18th century; it ended in 1756, as social conditions in China settled with the full establishment of the Qing Dynasty. Imitating Arita designs, fine "Chinese Imari" export wares were produced in the 18th century, eclipsing the original Japanese exports.

=== European Imari ===
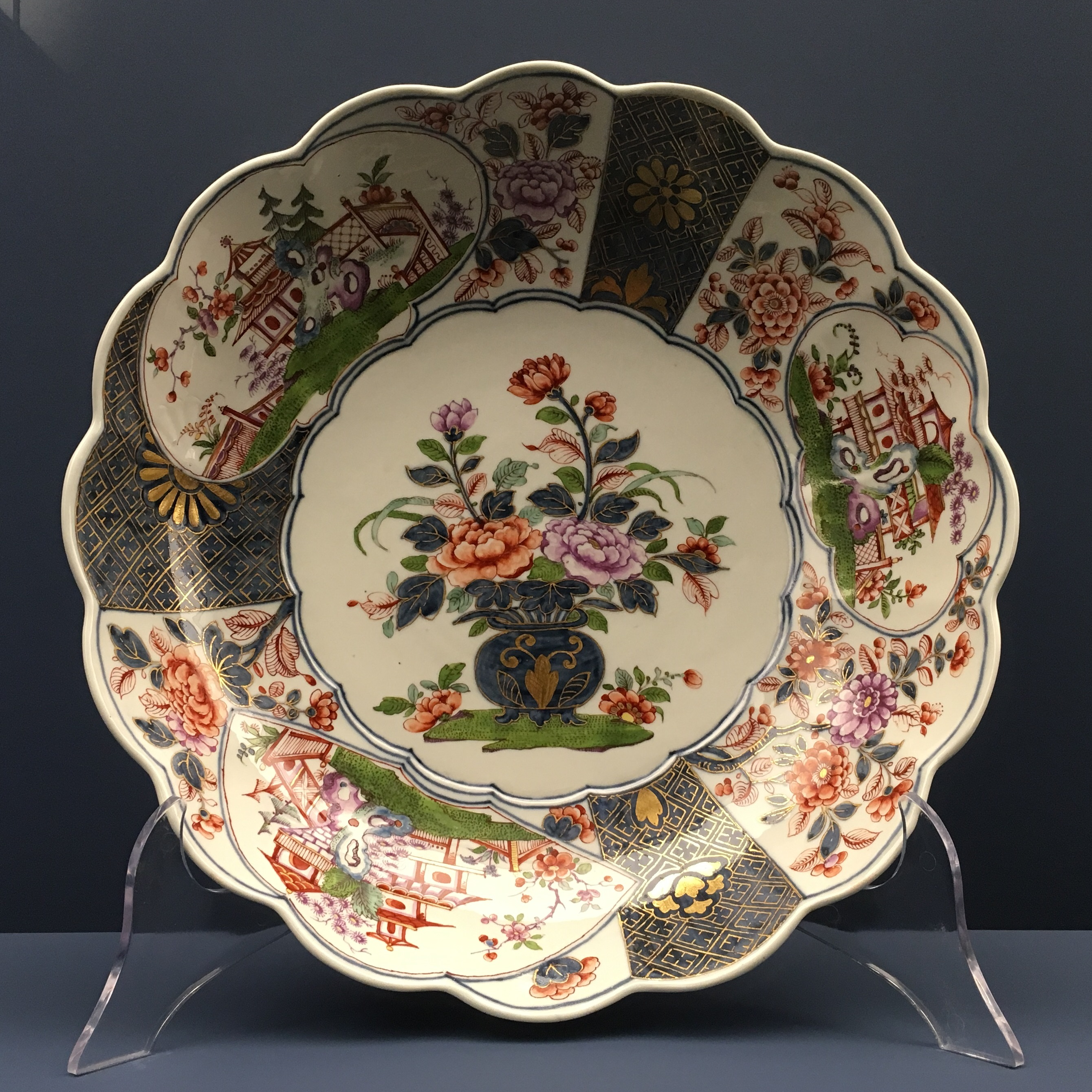
Porcelain bowl in the Imari style with garden scenes, chrysanthemums and peonies, painted, gold elevation. Imperial Viennese Porcelain Manufactory, 1744/49

European centers imitated the style of Imari wares, initially in faience at Delft in the Netherlands. Imari patterns, as well as "Kakiemon" designs and palette of colors, influenced some early Orientalizing wares produced by the porcelain manufactories at Meissen, Chantilly, or later at Vincennes and in Vienna. It was also produced in the early 19th century at Robert Chamberlain's Worcester porcelain factory at Worcester, as well as Crown Derby porcelain, where Imari patterns remain popular to the present.

== See also ==
- Japanese craft
- List of Traditional Crafts of Japan
