= Señorita Panamá 2002 =

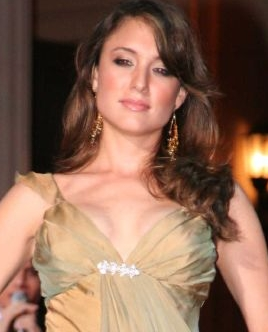
- Señorita Panamá 2002 - Stefanie de Roux
- Date: September 6, 2002
- Presenters: Carlos Mastellari, Madelaine Legnadier & Marisela Moreno
- Entertainment: Los Rabanes, René (ex salserín) & Carlos Ponce
- Venue: Centro de Convenciones Vasco Núñez, Panama City, Panama
- Broadcaster: RPC Televisión
- Entrants: 14
- Placements: 5
- Winner: Stefanie de Roux; Panama Centro

Señorita Panamá 2002 was the 20th Anniversary of the Señorita Panamá pageant which started in 1982 and 37th celebration of the Miss Panama contest, The event was held at the Vasco Núñez Convention Center of the Hotel Panamá, Panama City, on 6 September 2002.

The pageant was broadcast on RPC-TV Channel 4 on September 16. 14 contestants from all over Panama competed for the prestigious crown. At the conclusion of the final night of competition, outgoing titleholder Justine Pasek of Panama Centro who became later Miss Universe 2002 crowned Stefanie de Roux of Panama Centro as the new Señorita Panamá.

In the same night was celebrated the election of the "Señorita Panamá World", was announced the winner of the Señorita Panamá Mundo title. Señorita Panamá World 2001 Lourdes Cristina González Montenegro of Los Santos crowned Yoselín Sánchez Espino of Los Santos as the new Señorita Panamá World.

De Roux competed in the Miss Universe 2003 pageant, held at the Figali Convention Center, Panama City, Panama. on 3 June 2003. She placed among the Top 15 semi finalists. In other hands Sánchez competed in Miss World 2002, the 52nd edition of the Miss World pageant, was held on 7 December 2002 at the Alexandra Palace in London, United Kingdom.

== Results ==
=== Placements ===
Placement	Contestant
Señorita Panamá 2002	Panama City – Stefanie de Roux
Señorita Panamá World 2002	Los Santos – Yoselín Sánchez Espino
1st Runner-Up	Panama City – Yanela De Sedas
2nd Runner-Up	Panama City – Nelda Sánchez Cantoral
3rd Runner-Up	Panama City – María Isabel Arias

=== Special awards ===
Final results	Designer	Topic	Contestants
Best National Costume	Horacio Prado	Zaracundé	Yanela De Sedas
1st runner-up	Rogelio González	Princesa Nageyarib	Nelda Sánchez
2nd runner-up	José Luis González	Flor del Espíritu Santo	Ana Lorena Forgnone

Award	Contestant
Miss Congeniality	María Isabel Arias
Miss Photogenic	Yanela De Sedas
Best Hair	Estella Oller

=== Judges ===
- María Elena Berberían, TV Presenter.
- Giovanni Spirito, hairstylist.
- Liriola Pittí, Minister of Tourism.
- José Miguel Alemán - Minister of Health.
- Analía Núñez - Señorita Panamá 1999.
- María Cordelia Denis - Señorita Panamá World 1987.
- Julian Vergara, manager, Panamá Hotel.
- Mery Alfaro de Villageliú, socialité.

== Contestants ==
These are the competitors who have been selected this year.

Represent	Contestant	Age	Height (m)	Hometown	Sponsor
Panama City	Stella Oller Tawachi	20	1.68	Panama City	Mueblería Panamá
Panama City	Gabriela Alegre Panay	20	1.68	Panama City	GNC
Panama City	María Isabel Arias Eskildsen	20	1.70	Panama City	Vita Slim
Panama City	Karen Pittí	22	1.70	Panama City	Coca-Cola light
Colón	Karina Goods Caicedo	21	1.72	Colón	Sedal
Panama City	Genthamine Díaz Osorio	24	1.73	Panama City	Bellsouth
Panama City	Angela Beli De la Torre	24	1.74	San Miguelito	Mistolín
Panama City	Aracely Sáenz	21	1.74	Panama City	U2 Color Cream
Los Santos	Yoselin Sánchez Espino	21	1.74	Guararé	Max Factor
Panamá Oeste	Ana Lorena Forgnone Guerrero	21	1.75	Chorrera	Supermercado El Rey
Bocas del Toro	Carolina Miranda	20	1.76	Bocas del Toro	Palmovile
Panama City	Stefanie de Roux Martin	20	1.78	Panama City	Nevada
Panama City	Yanela De Sedas Santos	19	1.82	Panama City	Figali
Panama City	Nelda Sánchez Cantoral	20	1.83	Panama City	Melo

== Election schedule ==
- August 7 Press Conference in the salón Zafiro del Hotel Panamá.
- Friday September 6 Final night, coronation Señorita Panamá 2002.

== Candidates notes ==
- Stefanie De Roux later competed in the Miss Earth 2006 beauty pageant, held on November 26, 2006 in Manila, Philippines. She came in 5th place.
- Yoselin Sánchez Espino was among the boycotting contestants (joined in London) of Miss World 2002. She was Unplaced.
- Carolina Miranda represented Panama in Miss Earth 2002 as Miss Earth Panamá 2002. She was Unplaced.
- Karina Goods represented Panama in Miss Asia Pacific 2002.
- Gabriela Alegre Panay is the daughter of Jazmine Panay, Miss Panamá 1974.
