= Stefanie de Roux =

Panamanian model (born 1982)

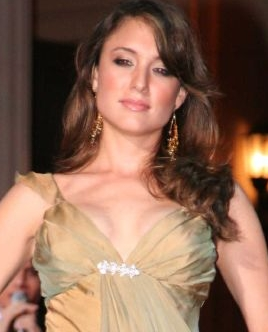
- Stephanie de Roux in the evening gown competition at Miss Earth 2006, 26 November 2006
- Born: 5 August 1982 (age 44); Panama City, Panama
- Education: Southern Methodist University (Corporate Communications)
- Height: 1.78 m (5 ft 10 in)
- Beauty pageant titleholder
- Title: Señorita Panamá 2002
- Hair color: Brunette
- Eye color: Hazel
- Major competitions: Señorita Panamá 2002 (Winner); Miss Universe 2003 (Top 15); Miss Earth 2006 (Top 8)
- Website: www.stefderoux.com

Stefanie de Roux Martin (born 5 August 1982) is a Panamanian model, tv host and beauty pageant titleholder. She was the winner of the 2002 Señorita Panamá pageant, and she competed in the Miss Universe 2003 pageant held in Panama City, Panama, where she was a semifinalist (Top 15).

== Early life ==
De Roux's life in show business started at the age of 15 when she entered a charity fashion show to help cancer research. Soon after, she was approached by an agency and began modeling. She graduated in Corporate Communications at Southern Methodist University (SMU) in Dallas, Texas. Stefanie is the current director of a model school.

== Señorita Panamá 2002 ==
De Roux is 5 ft 10 in (1.78 m) tall, and competed in and won the national beauty pageant Señorita Panamá 2002. She represented the state of Panamá Centro.

== Miss Universe 2003 ==
She represented Panama in the Miss Universe 2003 pageant held in Panama City, Panama where she was a semifinalist (Top 15)

== Miss Earth 2006 ==
She also was the representative of her country in the Miss Earth 2006 beauty pageant, held on 26 November 2006 in Manila, Philippines. She placed in the top eight and came in fifth place.

After her placement as a finalist in the 2006 edition of Miss Earth, she was included in the list of distinguished alumni of Southern Methodist University.

Awards and achievements
| Preceded by Justine Pasek | Señorita Panamá; 2002 | Succeeded by Jessica Rodríguez |
| Preceded by Rosemary Suárez | Miss Panama Earth; 2006 | Succeeded by Nadege Herrera |
