= Giselle Bissot =

Panamanian model and beauty pageant titleholder (born 1982)

- Born: Giselle Marie Bissot Kieswetter; 18 December 1982 (age 43); Panama City, Panama
- Height: 1.73 m (5 ft 8 in)
- Beauty pageant titleholder
- Title: Miss World Panamá 2006
- Hair color: Brown
- Eye color: Brown
- Major competitions: Señorita Panamá 2006 (Winner) (Best Hair); Miss World 2006 (Unplaced)

Giselle Marie Bissot Kieswetter (born 18 December 1982) is a Panamanian model and beauty pageant titleholder who was the winner of the Señorita Panamá 2006 title on 15 July 2006 for the Miss World 2006 contest.

== Participation in contests ==
In 1998, she took part in Chica & Chico Modelo. In 2003, she was the first finalist in Señorita Panamá. In 2005, she went to Miss Asia Pacificic International in China and also took part in the Miss Mesoamérica, which was held in Houston, where she occupied fourth place.

== Miss Panamá 2006 ==
At the end of the Señorita Panamá 2006 she also received awards including Best Hair, Miss Camel Toe and Miss Bikini Shop.

Bissot is 5 ft 8 in (1.73 m) tall, and competed in the national beauty pageant Señorita Panamá 2006. She represented the province of Panamá Centro.

== Miss World 2006 ==
She represented Panama in the 56th edition of the Miss World 2006 pageant, which was held at the Palace of Culture and Science in Warsaw, Poland on September 30, 2006. She was Top 25 Beach Beauty.

Awards and achievements
Preceded by María Alessandra Mezquita	Miss Panamá; 2006–2007	Succeeded by Sorangel Matos
Preceded by Anna Vaprio	Miss Panamá World; 2006–2007	Succeeded by Shey Ling Him
