= Tokuda Yasokichi =

Japanese potter (1873–1956)

- Born: 20 November 1873
- Died: 20 February 1956 (aged 82)
- Known for: Crafting pottery
- Style: Kutani ware

Tokuda Yasokichi I (20 November 1873 – 20 February 1956)(徳田八十吉) was a Japanese potter. He was born in near present day Kaga City, Ishikawa Prefecture. The area was made famous by the Kutani mines, the source of the clays utilized to make kutani ware.

At the time of his birth, Kutani ware was the leading export of ceramic items from Japan; however, the quality had dropped since it was first produced in 1655 during the early Edo period. Older, kutani ceramics, termed ko-kutani, was painted in great detail using five bold colours called the five colours of ko-kutani. These colours, dark green, deep blue, red, yellow, and purple made it stand out from other ceramic wares. Further, Yoshidaya style, renowned for its use of translucent pigment and delicate painting style, had been abandoned after only a brief flourish from 1824 to 1831. This style never contains the color red.

Tokuda Yasokichi I began his studies in Japanese-style painting under Tannrei Kano in 1888. At the age of 17, he began an apprenticeship under Sahira Matsumoto, a potter from Komatsu, who had already began a push to restore the quality of kutani ware to its former glory. Matsumoto trained Yasokichi I in the art of ceramic painting in the ko-kutani style. His works became indistinguishable from ko-kutani and the Yoshidaya style so he began to sign them to help keep them differentiated.

Supposedly, Tokuda Yasokichi I kept the formulations for the glazes he utilized secret and only handed them down within the family.

In 1953, he was awarded the title Nationally Important Intangible Cultural Property Keeper which is better known as a Living National Treasure.

Successors:

== Tokuda Yasokichi II, (Momokichi), (二代徳田八十吉) (1907–1997) ==
In 1923, when he was a teenager, Tokuda Yasokichi II was adopted by Tokuda Yasokichi I. He learned Kutani ware from his father and demonstrated his abilities by submitting works to the Ministry of Commerce and Industry Craft Exhibition. After the death of his father, in 1956, he took on the formal name Tokuda Yasokichi II. In 1975, he was certified as an intangible cultural property designated by Ishikawa Prefecture. In 1988 he handed over the Yasokichi title to his eldest son Masahiko, after which he called himself Momokichi.

== Tokuda Yasokichi III, (born Masahiko), (三代徳田八十吉), (1933–2009) ==
Masahiko was the first son of Tokuda Yasokichi II. He began learning ceramics when he was 20 under the instruction of both his father and grandfather. When Masahiko was 22 years old, his grandfather is said to have passed a document to him containing the secret formulas to preparing over 100 different shades of glaze colours. He is said to have interpreted the Kutani in a new way with abstract, colourful designs. In 1977, he received the Grand Prize for his work "Yosaibachi," exhibited at the 24th Japan Traditional Crafts Exhibition. In 1982, Masahiko succeeded his father and formally became Tokuda Yasokichi III.

In 1986, he was named a Bearer of Important Intangible Cultural Assets by Ishikawa Prefecture for his Kutani ware. In the 1980's, after switching over to an electric kiln, he made a mistake during a firing and forgot to switch the kiln off at the normal time. As a consequence when the error was finally caught, the ceramics within the kiln had been heated to a far higher temperature than normal and held at that temperature a long time. This caused the glazes to liquify and adjacent glazes to blend together. Instead of an abrupt colour change between different glaze colours, there was now a colour gradient. Further, the piece as a whole took on the appearance of blown glass. To make some of his advanced works, he first created a fine pattern, termed komon, inlayed into the work before glazing.

The blending of multiple glaze colours, yusai, was termed saiyu. According to the Handbook for the Appreciation of Japanese Traditional Crafts, the term saiyu is the more proper of the two terms and is characterized by delicate shading and a beautiful contrast of glaze colours that fuse together into a gradient upon a bisque that was previously fired at a high temperature. In 1997 Tokuda Yasokichi III was recognized as a Living National Treasure for his saiyu glaze technique. His works are held in many museums, including the British Museum and the Metropolitan Museum of Art.

Suntory, a Japanese whisky manufacturer, commissioned Yasokichi III to produce a limited addition of 150 saiyu style glazed bottles named “Hekiyo” for a 35 year-old Hibiki whiskey blend.

- Early works when he was known as Masahiko ending around 1982
- 1982 after being recognized as Tokuda Yasokichi III until around 1991
- In 1991 his signature style changed indicating the work was "Made by Yasokichi"
- In 1997 he added the Japanese character saku after he was designated a Living National Treasure

Additionally, there are works that appear to have been produced by Tokuda Yasokichi III that produced by firms like the Musubi Kiln located in the Nara Prefecture. Works like these tend to be either unsigned or produced with a red marking for the firm. The firm Musubi Kiln utilizes the term saiyu for Yasokichi III's innovation.

== Tokuda Yasokichi IV, (born Junko), (第代徳田八十吉), (1961–) ==
Yasokichi III was succeeded by his daughter Junko . Junko studied Kutani Pottery in her twenties at Ishikawa Prefectural Institute. She reports she was greatly influenced by artist Nakamura Kinpei from Kanazawa who has created many works in the Tokyo-yaki style. In 2009, her work was selected for the traditional Japanese crafts exhibition. In 2010, she formally changed her name becoming Tokuda Yasokichi IV, to prevent it from becoming extinct. As a female head, she is exceptional among ceramic family dynasties in Japan. In general, saiyu glazed works by Yasokichi IV can be differentiated from those of her father by her signature and her colour patterns. Yasokichi IV colours tend to be lighter and she will sometimes utilize reds, more yellow, or even whites, whereas colours selected by her father tend towards deep blues at the base of his works to light greens. In an article she was quoted as saying, "My father’s work was characterised by sharp lines, but I strive towards subtle changes to make my style more round and feminine."
