= Rosa María Hernández =

Panamanian model (born 1983)

- Born: Rosa María Hernández Cedeño; 29 July 1983 (age 42); Los Santos, Panama
- Height: 1.74 m (5 ft 8 1/2 in)
- Beauty pageant titleholder
- Hair color: Brown
- Eye color: Brown

Rosa María Hernández Cedeño (born 29 July 1983) is a Panamanian model and beauty pageant titleholder. Born in Los Santos, Panama, she was the official representative of Panama in the 54th Miss Universe 2005 pageant, held at the Impact Arena, Bangkok, Thailand, on 31 May 2005.

Hernández, who is 5 ft 8.5 in (1.74 m) tall, competed in the national beauty pageant Señorita Panamá 2004, on 11 September 2004, and obtained the title of Señorita Panamá Universo. She represented Los Santos Province.

Awards and achievements
Preceded by Jessica Rodríguez	Miss Panamá; 2004–2005	Succeeded by María Alessandra Mezquita
