= Jessica Rodríguez =

Panamanian model

- Born: Jessica Patricia Rodríguez Clark; 18 September 1981 (age 43); Panama City, Panama
- Height: 1.80 m (5 ft 11 in)
- Beauty pageant titleholder
- Hair color: Blonde
- Eye color: Blue

Jessica Patricia Rodríguez Clark (born September 18, 1981) is a Panamanian model and beauty pageant titleholder. She was the official representative of Panama in the 53rd Miss Universe 2004 pageant, that was held at the Centro de Convenciones CEMEXPO, Quito, Ecuador, on 1 June 2004. She won the Best National Costume.

Rodríguez, who is 5 ft 11 in (1.80 m) tall, competed in the national beauty pageant Señorita Panamá 2003, on Thursday, 26 November 2003, and obtained the title of Señorita Panamá Universo. She represented Panamá Centro state.

Awards and achievements
Preceded by Stefanie de Roux	Miss Panamá; 2003–2004	Succeeded by Rosa María Hernández
