= Miss International 2006 =

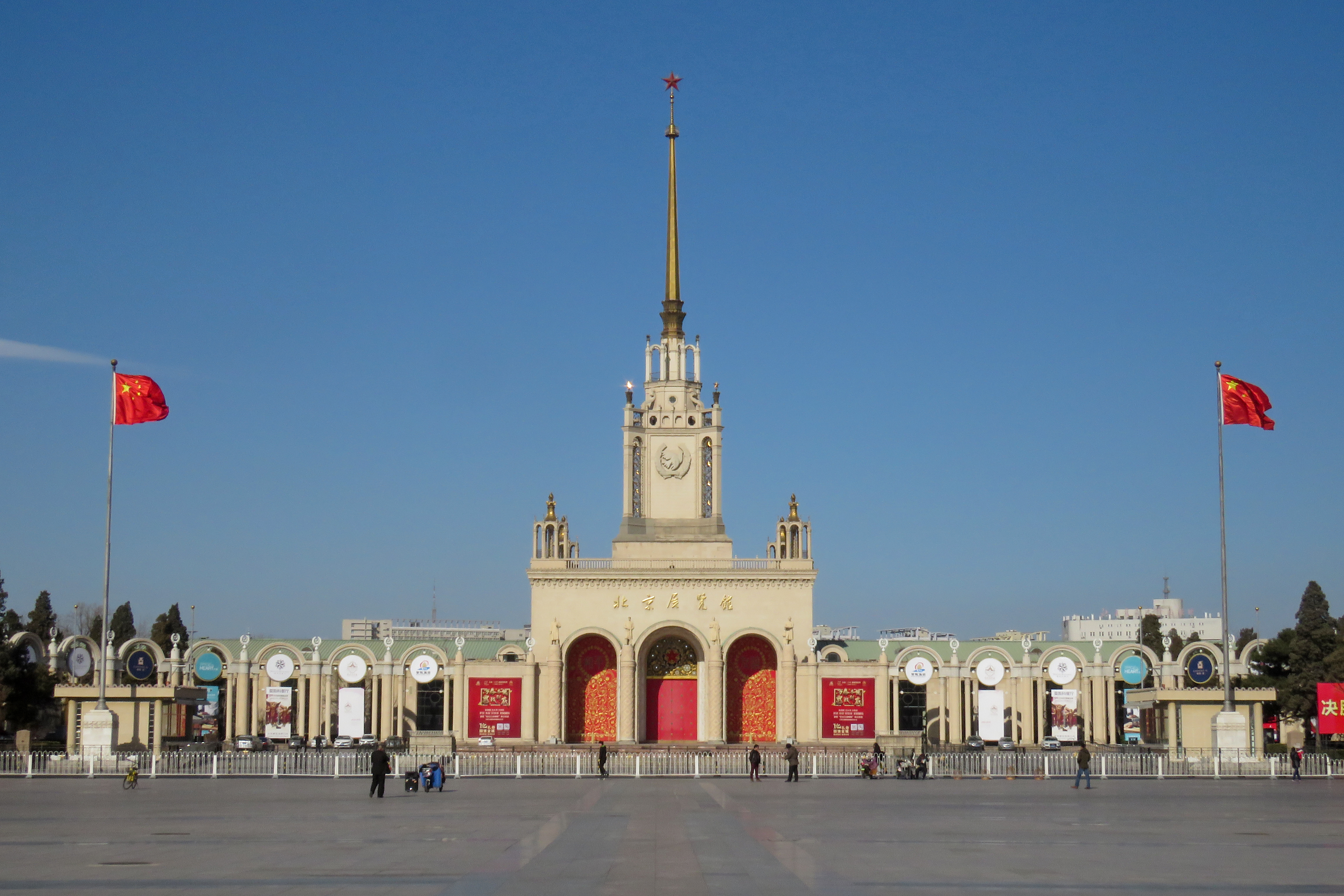
- Date: November 11, 2006
- Venue: Beijing Exhibition Center, Beijing, China
- Broadcaster: TV Tokyo
- Entrants: 53
- Placements: 12
- Debuts: Guadeloupe; Kenya; Martinique; Republic of the Congo; Sudan
- Withdrawals: Bahamas; El Salvador; Greece; Israel; Kazakhstan; Macau; Malaysia; Mongolia; Nicaragua; Paraguay; Sweden; United Kingdom; United States
- Returns: Egypt; Guatemala; Mexico; Nigeria; Northern Mariana Islands; Russia; Sri Lanka; Vietnam
- Winner: Daniela Di Giacomo; Venezuela
- Congeniality: Koni Lui (Hong Kong)
- Best National Costume: Mayte Sánchez (Panama)
- Photogenic: Vasana Wongbuntree (Thailand); Karoliina Yläjoki (Finland)

Miss International 2006, the 46th Miss International pageant, was held both in Tokyo, Japan, and Beijing, China. The contestants arrived in Tokyo, Japan on October 12 and the finals was held on November 11, 2006, at the Beijing Exhibition Center in Beijing, China. 53 contestants competed.

At the end of the event, Precious Lara Quigaman of the Philippines crowned her successor Daniela Di Giacomo of Venezuela. This marked Venezuela's fifth title in Miss International history. The first runner-up was Mayte Sánchez from Panama and the second runner-up was Jang Yoon-seo from South Korea.

== Results ==
=== Placements ===
Placement	Contestant
Miss International 2006	Venezuela – Daniela Di Giacomo
1st Runner-up	Panama – Mayte Sánchez
2nd Runner-up	South Korea – Jang Yoon-seo
Top 12	China – Chen Qian; Colombia – Karina Guerra; Dominican Republic – Wilma Abreu; Guadeloupe – Meryta Melina; India – Sonnalli Seygall; Japan – Mami Sakurai; Puerto Rico – Sharon Gómez; Spain – Sara Sánchez Torres; Thailand – Vasana Wongbuntree

=== Special awards ===
Awards	Contestant
Miss Photogenic in China	Finland - Karoliina Ylajoki
Miss Photogenic in Japan	Thailand - Vasana Wongbuntree
Miss Goodwill	Puerto Rico - Sharon Gomez
Miss Friendship	Hong Kong - Koni Lui
Miss Vibrant	Brazil - Maria Claudia Barreto
Best National Costume	Panama - Mayte Sanchez
Compassionate Award	China - Chen Qian
Best Body	Colombia - Karina Guerra
Best Preliminary Performance	Germany - Hiltja Muller
Best Overall Style	Venezuela - Daniela Di Giacomo
Best Figure	Venezuela - Daniela Di Giacomo

== Contestants ==
- Aruba - Luizanne Donata
- Australia - Karli Smith
- Bolivia - Pamela Justiniano Saucedo
- Brazil - Maria Cláudia Barreto de Oliveira
- Canada - Emily Ann Kiss
- China - Chen Qian
- Colombia - Karina Guerra Rodríguez
- Cyprus - Elena Georgiou
- Czech Republic - Katerina Pospisilova
- Dominican Republic - Wilma Abreu Nazario
- Ecuador - Denisse Elizabeth Rodríguez Quiñónez
- Egypt - Elham Wagdi Fadel
- Ethiopia - Fethiya Mohammed Seid
- Finland - Karoliina Yläjoki
- France - Marie-Charlotte Meré
- Germany - Hiltja Müller
- Guadeloupe - Melina Aurelie Meryta
- Guatemala - Mirna Lissy Salguero Moscoso
- Honduras - Lissa Diana Viera Sáenz
- Hong Kong - Koni Lui
- India - Sonnalli Seygall
- Japan - Mami Sakurai
- Kenya - Rachel Nyameyo
- Malaysia - Iris Hng Choy Yin
- Martinique - Murielle Desgrelle
- Mexico - Alondra del Carmen Robles Dobler
- Mongolia - Bolortuya Dagva
- New Caledonia - Fabienne Vidoire
- New Zealand - Claire Beattie
- Nigeria - Misel Uku
- Northern Mariana Islands - Shequita DeLeon Guerrero Bennett
- Norway - Linn Andersen
- Panama - Mayte Sánchez González
- Peru - Lissy Consuelo Miranda Muñoz
- Philippines - Denille Lou Valmonte
- Poland - Marta Jakoniuk
- Puerto Rico - Sharon Gómez
- Republic of the Congo - Maurielle Nkouka Massamba
- Russia - Elena Vinogradova
- Serbia and Montenegro - Danka Dizdarevic
- Singapore - Genecia Luo
- Slovak Republic - Dagmar Ivanova
- South Korea - Jang Yoon-seo
- Spain - Sara Sánchez Torres
- Sri Lanka - Gayesha Perera
- Sudan - Rebecca Chor Malek
- Taiwan - Liu Tzu-Hsuan
- Tanzania - Angel Delight Kileo
- Thailand - Vasana Wongbuntree
- Turkey - Asena Tugal
- Ukraine - Inna Goruk
- Venezuela - Daniela Anette Di Giacomo Di Giovanni
- Vietnam - Vũ Ngọc Diệp

== Notes ==
=== Withdrawals ===
- Bahamas
- Greece
- Israel
- Kazakhstan
- Nepal
- United Kingdom
- United States

=== Did not compete ===
- Bahamas - Sharie Delva
- Ghana - Priscilla Amara Marfo
- Greece - Tzoulia Alexandratou
- Guyana - Kristia Ramlagan
- Israel - Tehila Mor
- Kazakhstan
- Liberia - Bendu Ciapha
- Malta
- Nepal - Bunita Sunuwar
- Tahiti - Salmon Faimano
- United Kingdom - Lucy Avril Evangelista (SF World '05)
- Uruguay - María Alejandra Américo Chacon
- United States - Sara Dee Harrigfeld

=== Crossovers ===
Miss Universe

- 2006: Northern Marianas - Shequita Bennett
- 2009: Egypt - Elham Wagdi

Miss World

- 2005: Guadeloupe - Meryta Melina

Miss Earth

- 2005: Egypt - Elham Wagdi
- 2007: Tanzania - Angel Delight Kileo

Miss Intercontinental

- 2007: Egypt - Elham Wagdi (Semi-finalist)

Miss All Nations

- 2010: Thailand - Vasana Wongbuntree (3rd runner-up)

Miss Global Beauty Queen

- 2009: Thailand - Vasana Wongbuntree (Winner, Miss Photogenic, as Bangkok)

World Miss University

- 2007: Canada - Emily Ann Kiss

Miss Tourism Queen International

- 2007: Thailand - Vasana Wongbuntree (1st runner-up)
- 2009: Sri Lanka - Gayesha Perera (Miss Talent)

Reinado Internacional del Café

- 2012: Canada - Emily Ann Kiss
