= Señorita Panamá 2026 =

59th Miss Panamá pageant

- Date: September 5, 2026
- Presenters: Analía Núñez; Sheldry Sáez
- Entertainment: Katriana; Kael Wonder
- Venue: Roberto Durán Arena, Panama City, Panama
- Broadcaster: YouTube; Telemetro
- Entrants: 27
- Placements: 14
- Winner: Gabriela Lineth González del Valle; Chiriquí
- Congeniality: Anyuris Yuleidys Arrocha - Panamá Norte
- Photogenic: Carmen Johany Quintero Pittí - Chiriquí Occidente

Señorita Panamá 2026 was the 59th edition of the Señorita Panamá pageant, held at the Roberto Durán Arena in Panama City, Panama, on September 5, 2026. This was the second selection of the renewed Señorita Panama pageant, under the direction of Cesar Anel Rodríguez, who took charge of the national event after re-acquired the franchise in 2024. Twenty-seven preliminary contestants were selected from throughout Panama and competed for the crown.

Señorita Panamá 2024 Mirna Caballini Bouche from Chiriquí crowned Gabriela Lineth González del Valle of Chiriquí as her successor at the end of the event.

González will represent Panamá in Miss Universe 2026, the 75th Miss Universe pageant, scheduled to be held at the José Miguel Agrelot Coliseum in San Juan, Puerto Rico, on 24 November 2026.

On Monday, September 21, 2026, Carmen Johany Quintero Pittí from Chiriquí Occidente was announced the winner of the Señorita Panamá International 2026 title.

== Results ==
=== Placements ===
Placement	Contestant
Miss Universe Panama 2026	Chiriquí – Gabriela Lineth González del Valle
1st Runner-Up	La Chorrera - Emily Linoshka Barahona
2nd runner-Up	Colón – Gabriela Rossie Justiniani
3rd Runner-Up	La Palma – Elenkys Martínez
4th Runner-Up	Panamá Centro – Stacy Nicole Escobar
5th Runner-Up	Penonome – María del Rosario Vargas
6th runner-up	Los Santos – Ilanith Julieth Ávila
Top 14	Archipiélagos – Isabel Mariye Campos §; Arraiján – Adriana Sofía Ramsay; Chitré – Angela Camila Olaya; David – Katherine Stefanie López; Las Tablas – Isabella Kristina Núñez; Riviera del Canal – Shirley Anais Castillo; Taboga – Melanys Martínez

§ – Fan Vote winner

=== Special awards ===
Award	Contestant
Miss Congeniality	Anyuris Yuleidys Arrocha – Panamá Norte
Best National Costume	Ilanith Julieth Ávila – Los Santos
Best Skin	Gabriela Justiniani - Colón
Miss Photogenic	Carmen Johany Quintero - Chiriquí Occidente
Best Projection	Melanys Martínez - Taboga

== Judges ==
- Johan Noffra: Editor-in-Chief of Debut magazine.
- Cibeles De Freitas: Thought leader, international speaker, and bestselling author.
- Marisa Vernaza: Nutritionist and holistic nutrition expert.
- David Poveda: Aesthetic physician and creator of the Impilo Signature Balance protocol.
- Elena Llorach: Television and digital media production company, with an emphasis on folklore.
- Glynnies Reyes: Panamanian dermatologist, specialist in aesthetics, and founder of the Center for Comprehensive Dermatology (CDI).
- Patricia Castillo: TV Presenter (only as a final judge).
- Marelissa Him: Panamanian model, presenter, athlete and Miss Earth Panamá 2011 (only as a final judge).
- Ivette Cordovez: Actress, television presenter, model and Señorita Panamá 2000 (only as a final judge).
- Mariela Vega: Lawyer and former member of the Panamenian parliament (only as a final judge).
- Asley Sanchez: Certified Public Accountant (only as a final judge).
- John Wilson: Plastic, Aesthetic, and Reconstructive Surgeon (only as a final judge).
- Carla-Mari Schellink: Founder and Director of Impilo Plastic Surgery & Medical Spa and Impilo Organics (only as a final judge).
- Edwin Adame Farrell: Panamanian banker (only as a final judge).

== Preliminary competition ==
=== Presentation Show ===
The presentation Show took place on August 9, 2026, a ceremony that took place at the Aurora at Soho, in Panama City, where the twenty seven candidates who were officially presented to the public and the press were officially presented. In this event the winner of the Miss Social Media title was chosen.

Final results	Contestant	Province
Winner	Taiz Villaverde	Bocas del Toro
Second Place	Gabriela Justiniani	Colón
Third Place	Gabriela González	Chiriquí

=== Preliminary interview ===
Held on August 30, the Señorita Panama candidates were qualified in a personal interview for the judges.

=== Preliminary Selection ===
Celebrated on September 4, the candidates were qualified in swimsuit and evening gown.

== National Costume Competition ==
On September 4, was celebrated the National Costume contestant called Gala Viva Panamá. In this competition the contestants are not evaluated, only the costumes. It is a competition showing the country's wealth embodied in the colorful and fascinating costumes made by Panamanian designers combining the past and present of Panama. The winner costume represent Panamá in Miss Universe 2026.

Final results	Contest	Designer	Topic	Contestant
Winner	Best National Costume to Miss Universe	César Pinilla	"Diosa Panamá: El Oro Verde"	Ilanith Julieth Ávila

== Contestants ==
These are the competitors.

City/Province	Contestant	Age	Hometown
Archipiélagos	Isabel Mariye Campos Almanza		Panama City
Arraiján	Adriana Sofía Ramsay Linares	25	Arraiján
Bocas del Toro	Taiz Cristel Villaverde Watson		Bocas Town
Capira	Amyra Lisseth Moreno Ramos	26	Capira
Casco Antiguo	Gina Paola Rujano Agüero	25	Panama City
Chiriquí	Gabriela Lineth González del Valle	20	David
Chiriquí Occidente	Carmen Johany Quintero Pittí	24	Puerto Armuelles
Chitré	Angela Camila Olaya García	18	Chitré
Coclé	Stephanie Rachell De León Calderón		Penonomé
Colón	Gabriela Rossie Justiniani Cummings		Colón
Darién	Kairyn Aimeth Rivas Brackman	25	Darién
David	Katherine Stefanie López Tribaldos	37	David
Herrera	Isabel Lourdes Sánchez Baule	21	Chitré
La Chorrera	Emily Linoshka Barahona Manning		La Chorrera
La Palma	Elenkys Martínez	18	Darién
Las Tablas	Isabella Kristina Núñez Cedeño	20	Las Tablas
Los Santos	Ilanith Julieth Ávila Jiménez	18	Las Tablas
Panamá Centro	Stacy Nicole Escobar	31	Panama City
Panamá Este	Ilisneth Gil	20	Panama City
Panamá Norte	Anyuris Yuleidys Arrocha Winford	21	Panama City
Panamá Oeste	Luz Alvarado		La Chorrera
Panamá Viejo	Noris Padilla		Panama City
Penonomé	María del Rosario Vargas		Penonomé
Riviera del Canal	Shirley Anais Castillo Aparicio	30	Panama City
Riviera Pacífica	Yadianis Yaneth De León Guerra	26	Panama City
Taboga	Melanys Martínez		Panama City
Veraguas	Arantxa Franceschi Tovar	30	Santiago de Veraguas
