= Señorita Panamá 2000 =

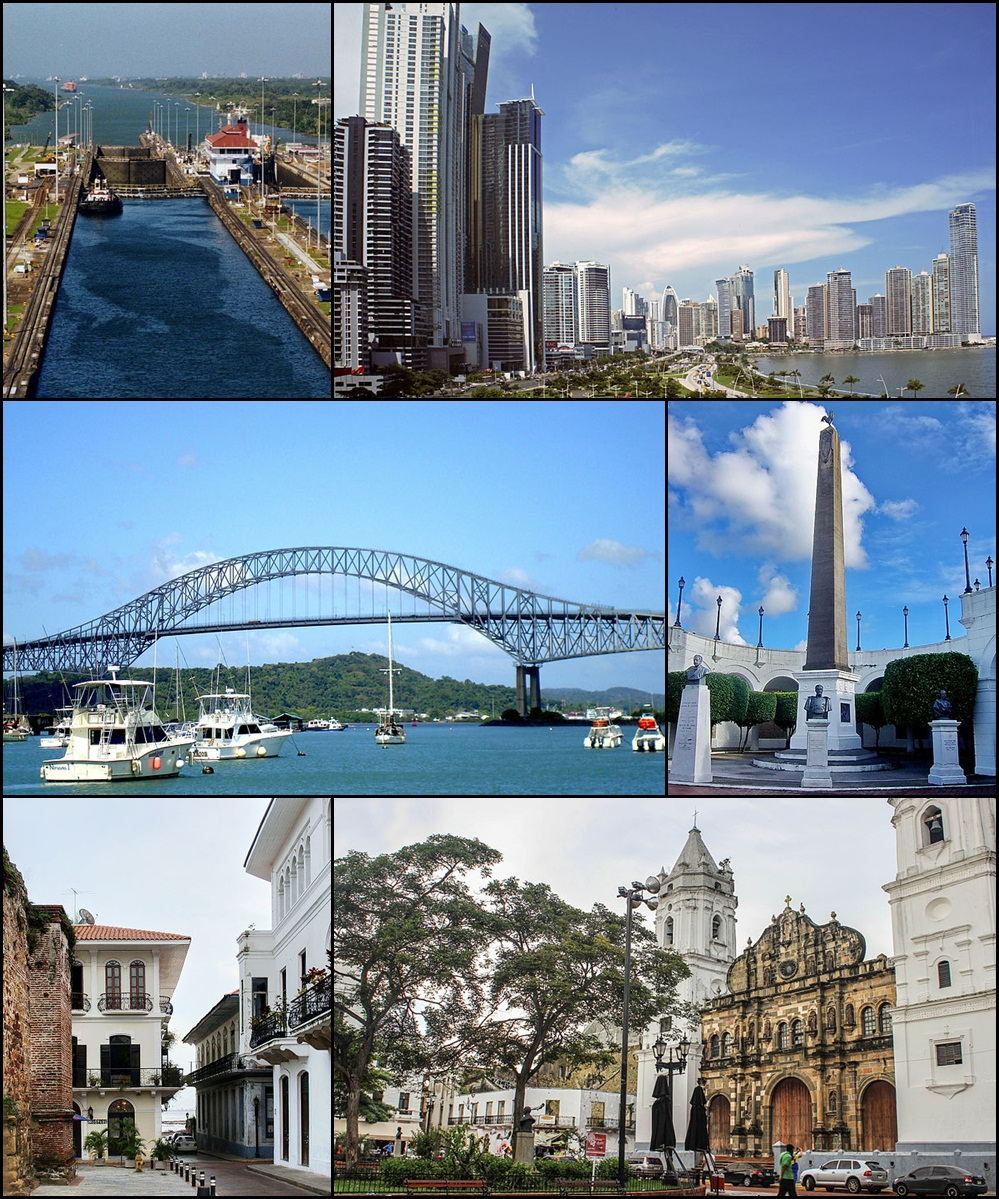
- Señorita Panamá 2000
- Date: September 1, 2000
- Presenters: Alvaro Alvarado; Madelaine Leignadier; Adriana Paredes; Carlos Mastellari
- Entertainment: Francisco Céspedes; Tony Cheng
- Venue: Atlapa Convention Centre, Panama City, Panama
- Broadcaster: RPC Televisión
- Entrants: 12
- Placements: 5
- Winner: Ivette Cordovez; Panama Centro

Señorita Panamá 2000, the 18th Señorita Panamá pageant and 35th celebration of the Miss Panamá contest, was held in Teatro Anayansi Centro de Convenciones Atlapa, Panama City, Panama, on September 1, 2000, after weeks of events. The winner of the pageant was Ivette Cordovez Usuga.

The pageant was broadcast on September 10 through RPC Televisión Channel 4. About 12 contestants from all over Panamá competed for the prestigious crown. At the conclusion of the final night of competition, outgoing titleholder Analía Núñez of Chiriquí crowned Ivette Cordovez of Panama Centro as the new Señorita Panamá.

In the same night was celebrated the election of the "Señorita Panamá World", was announced the winner of the Señorita Panamá Mundo title. Señorita Panamá World 1999 Jessenia Casanova Reyes of Panama Centro crowned Ana Raquel Ochy Pozo of Cocle as the new Señorita Panamá World. Also was selected the representative for the Miss Asia Pacific pageant Adriana Roquer Hidalgo of Panamá Este was crowned by Marianela Salazar Guillén of Panama Centro.

Cordovez competed in Miss Universe 2001 the 50th edition of the Miss Universe pageant, held at the Coliseo Rubén Rodríguez, Bayamón, Puerto Rico on May 11, 2001.

In other hands González competed in Miss World 2000, the 50th edition of the Miss World pageant, was held on 30 November 2000 at the Millennium Dome in London, United Kingdom. Roquer Hidalgo placed in the Top 10 at Miss Asia Pacific 2001.

== Result ==
=== Placements ===
Placement	Contestant
Señorita Panamá 2000	Panamá Centro – Ivette Cordovez
Señorita Panamá World 2000	Coclé – Ana Raquel Ochy
Señorita Panamá Asia Pacific 2000	Panamá Este – Adriana Maricel Roquer
1st Runner-Up	Chiriquí – Katherine Villaverde
2nd Runner-Up	Veraguas – Melva De Gracia

=== Special awards ===
Final results	Topic
Best National Costume to Miss Universe	Traje de India Kuna

Award	Contestant
Miss Congeniality	María Carolina Cornejo Martínez
Miss Photogenic	Ana Raquel Ochy Pozo

=== Judges ===
- Mingthoy M. Giro - Panamanian journalist.
- Raúl García de Paredes - Dermatologist.
- Magali Méndez - editor Mundo Social Magazine.
- Nabil Semaan - Figaly store represent.
- Lorena Zagia - Señorita Panamá World 1998.
- Luis Alfonso Ortega - Stylist.
- Marian Mario - designer.
- Luis Enrique Bandera - Asecomer Director.
- Dora de Díaz- Guillén - Dermatologist.

== Contestants ==
These are the competitors who have been selected this year.

Represent	Contestant	Age	Height (m)	Hometown
Panama City	Velkys Yoliana Bultrón Guardia	19	1.66	Panama City
Panama City	María Carolina Cornejo Martínez	24	1.67	Panama City
Chiriquí	Katherine Elena Villaverde Alexópulos	22	1.67	David
Panama City	Flor Elisa Kinglow Camarena	21	1.68	Panama City
Panama City	Michelle Marie Palau Campo	21	1.68	Panama City
Panama City	Aida María Aguilera Crespo	25	1.70	Panama City
Panama City	Nadiuska Liz Del Castillo Amaya	20	1.70	Panama City
Veraguas	Melva Aileen de Gracia Yee	21	1.71	Santiago
Panamá Centro	Ivette María Cordovez Usuga	20	1.72	Panama City
Panama City	Kiria Celineth Aguilar Romero	23	1.74	Panama City
Panamá Este	Adriana Maricel Roguer Hidalgo	20	1.75	Panama City
Cocle	Ana Raquel Ochy Pozo	21	1.78	Penonomé

== Election schedule ==
- Thursday September 1 Final night, coronation Señorita Panamá 2000

== Candidates notes ==
Adriana Roquer was a semi-finalist in Miss Asia-Pacific 2001.
