= Señorita Panamá 1997 =

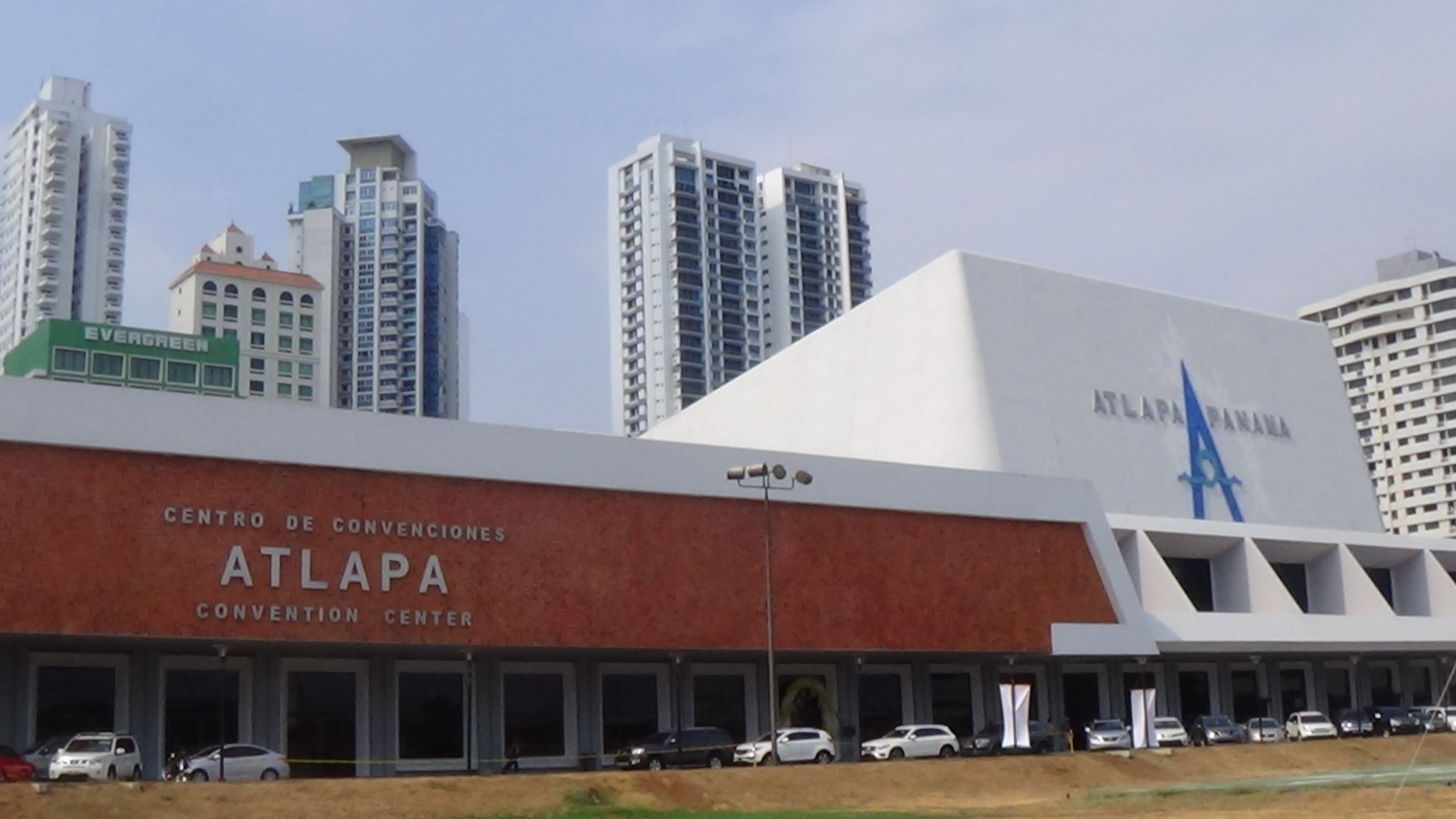
- Atlapa, venue of Señorita Panamá 1997
- Date: August 30, 1997
- Presenters: Ivan Donoso, Madelaine Leignadier, Marisela Moreno
- Entertainment: Miguel Bosé, Amanda Miguel, Ricardo & Alberto and Pescuezipela'o
- Venue: Atlapa Convention Centre, Panama City, Panama
- Broadcaster: RPC Televisión
- Entrants: 14
- Placements: 5
- Winner: Tanisha Drummond; Colón

Señorita Panamá 1997, the 15th Señorita Panamá pageant and 32nd celebration of the Miss Panamá contest, was held in Teatro Anayansi Centro de Convenciones Atlapa, Panama City, Panama, on Saturday, August 30, 1997, after weeks of events. The winner of the pageant was Tanisha Drummond.

The pageant was broadcast live on RPC Televisión. About 14 contestants from all over Panamá competed for the prestigious crown. At the conclusion of the final night of competition, outgoing titleholder Lía Borrero of Los Santos crowned Tanisha Drummond of Colón as the new Señorita Panamá.

In the same night was celebrated the election of the "Señorita Panamá World", was announced the winner of the Señorita Panamá Mundo title. Señorita Panamá World 1996 Norma Elida Pérez of Panamá Centro crowned Patricia Aurora Bremner Hernández of Panamá Centro as the new Señorita Panamá World. Also was selected the representative for the Nuestra Belleza Internacional pageant Iris Avila Moreno of Panamá Centro was crowned by Amelie González Assereto Nuestra Belleza Internacional Panamá 1996.

Also Bremner Hernández competed in Miss World 1997, the 47th edition of the Miss World pageant, was held on 22 November 1997 in Baie Lazare, Seychelles. Avila Moreno competed in Nuestra Belleza Internacional 1997 pageant, the 4th and final edition of Nuestra Belleza Internacional Pageant held on November 21, 1997 in Miami, United States.

== Result ==
=== Placements ===
Placement	Contestant
Señorita Panamá 1998	Colón – Tanisha Drummond
Señorita Panamá World 1998	Panamá Centro – Patricia Aurora Bremner Hernández
Señorita Panamá Nuestra Belleza Internacional 1998	Panamá Centro – Iris Avila Moreno
1st Runner-Up	Panama City – Monica Herrador Gonzalez
2nd Runner-Up	Panama City – Lourdes Priscilla Lewis Artavia

=== Special awards ===
Final results	Designer	Topic
Best National Costume to Miss Universe	Javier Burgos	"Interpretacion de la Pollera y sus joyas"

== Contestants ==
These are the competitors who have been selected this year.

#	Represent	Contestant	Age	Height	Hometown
1	Chiriquí	Belen Ramirez Urriola	21	5'5"	David
2	Panama City	Maria Teresa Maure	23	5'5"	Panama City
3	Panama City	Melanie Sarti Baquerizo	19	5'7"	Panama City
4	Panama City	Narmila Navarro Guardia	22	5'7"	Panama City
5	Colón	Dayanara Phipps Duffis	22	5'7"	Colón
6	Panama City	Mariana Duran Yuen	20	5'7"	Panama City
7	Panama City	Yamilet Vejarano Castro	22	5'7"	Panama City
8	Panama City	Tessie Angulo Gonzalez	23	5'8"	Panama City
9	Colón	Tanisha Drummond Johnson	21	5'8"	Colón
10	Panama City	Monica Herrador Gonzalez	20	5'9"	Panama City
11	Panama City	Patricia Bremner Hernandez	21	5'9"	Panama City
12	Panama City	Iris Avila Moreno	24	5'10"	Panama City
13	Panama City	Lourdes Priscilla Lewis Artavia	19	5'11"	Panama City
14	Panama City'	Mariela Vega Benedito	22	6'0"	Panama City

== Election schedule ==
- Saturday 30 August Final night, coronation Señorita Panamá 1997

== Candidates notes ==
Tanisha Drummond also competed for Panamá in the Miss Caraïbes Hibiscus 1998 and won the title. This is the first title for Panamá in this pageant.

== Historical significance ==
Colón won Señorita Panamá for third time, the first time with Sonia Inés Ríos (1965) and second with Gloria Karamañites ( 1980).
