= Señorita Panamá 1996 =

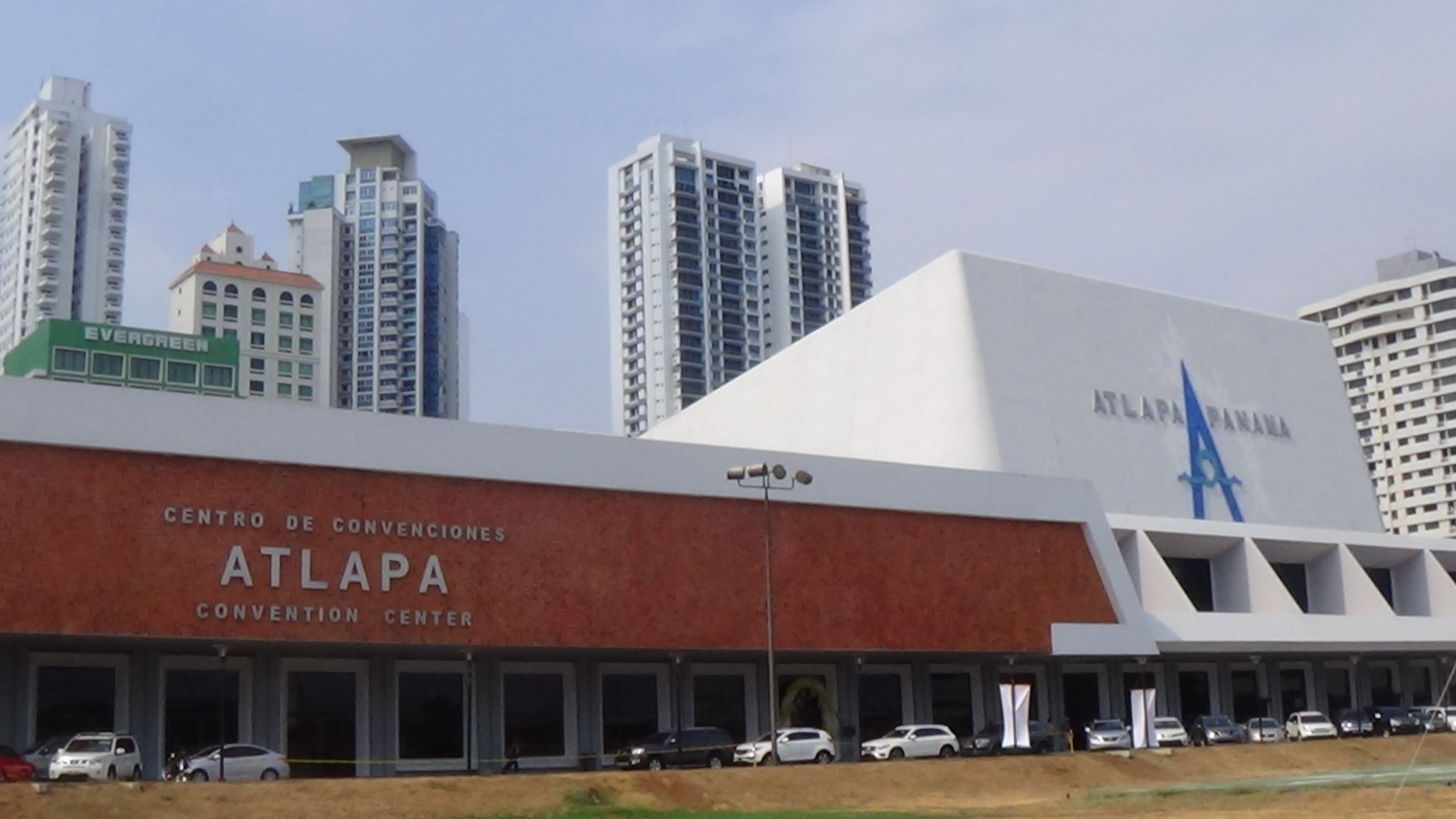
- Atlapa, venue of Señorita Panamá 1996
- Date: September 1996; 30 years ago
- Presenters: Iván Donoso, Madelaine Legnadier & Ana Lucia Herrera
- Venue: Atlapa Convention Centre, Panama City, Panama
- Broadcaster: RPC Televisión
- Entrants: 15
- Placements: 5
- Winner: Lía Victoria Borrero González; Los Santos

Señorita Panamá 1996, the 14th Señorita Panamá pageant and 31st celebration of the Miss Panamá contest, was held in Teatro Anayansi Centro de Convenciones Atlapa, Panama City, Panama, September 1996, after weeks of events. The winner of the pageant was Lía Borrero.

The pageant was broadcast live on RPC Televisión. About 15 contestants from all over Panamá competed for the prestigious crown. At the conclusion of the final night of competition, outgoing titleholder Reyna Royo of Panamá Centro crowned Lía Borrero of Los Santos as the new Señorita Panamá.

In the same night was celebrated the election of the Señorita Panamá World, was announced the winner of the Señorita Panamá Mundo title. Señorita Panamá World 1995, Marisela Moreno of Panamá Centro crowned Norma Elida Pérez Rodriguez of Panamá Centro as the new Señorita Panamá World. Also was selected the representative for the Nuestra Belleza Internacional pageant, Amelie González Assereto of Panamá Centro was crowned by Patricia De León Barichovicht, Señorita Panamá Hispanidad 1995 of Panamá Centro.

The 46th edition of the Miss Universe 1997 pageant, was held at the Miami Beach Convention Center, Miami Beach, Florida, United States on May 16, 1997.

In other hands Norma Elida Pérez competed in Miss World 1996, the 46th edition of the Miss World pageant, took place on 23 November 1996 in the city of Bangalore, India. González Assereto competed in Nuestra Belleza Internacional 1996 the 3rd edition of Nuestra Belleza Internacional Pageant held on November 25, 1996 in Miami, United States.

== Final result ==
| Final results | Contestant |
|---|---|
| Señorita Panamá 1996 | Los Santos – Lía Borrero |
| Señorita Panamá World | Panama City – Norma Elida Pérez Rodriguez |
| Señorita Panamá Nuestra Belleza Internacional | Panama City – Amelie González Assereto |
| 1st Runner up | Panama City – Hazul Cortes |
| 2nd Runner up | Panama City – Mildred Vasquez |

=== Special awards ===
| Final results | Topic |
|---|---|
| National Costume to Miss Universe | "Pollera Nacional" |

| Award | Represent | Contestant |
|---|---|---|
| Miss Photogenic | Los Santos | Carmen Marin Cortéz |

== Contestants ==
These are the competitors who have been selected this year.

| # | Represent | Contestant | Age | Height | Hometown |
|---|---|---|---|---|---|
| 1 | Los Santos | Carmen Marin Cortéz | - | mts | Las Tablas |
| 2 | | Gloria Lopez | - | mts | Panama City |
| 3 | | Patricia Almanza | - | 1.70 mts | Panama City |
| 4 | Los Santos | Lía Borrero | - | 1.75 mts | Las Tablas |
| 5 | | Zelmar Rodríguez Crespo | - | mts | |
| 6 | | Hazul Cortez Nelson | - | -mts | |
| 7 | Panamá Centro | Norma Elida Pérez Rodriguez | 21 | mts | |
| 8 | | Mildred Vásquez Brown | - | mts | |
| 9 | Panamá Centro | Amelie González Assereto | - | mts | |
| 10 | | Maribel Concepción | - | mts | |
| 11 | | Solymar Antadillas | - | mts | |
| 12 | | Jhasmin Castillero | - | -mts | |
| 13 | | Jelly Ann Castro | - | -mts | |
| 14 | | Omayra Contreras | - | -mts | Panama City |
| 15 | | Regina Diez Gorgas | - | -mts | |

== Election schedule ==
- Thursday September Final night, coronation Señorita Panamá 1996

== Candidates motes ==
Lía Borrero also compete for Panamá in the Miss International 1998 won the title.

== Historical significance ==
Los Santos won Señorita Panamá for five time, the last time with Gabriela Ducaza, 1987.
