= Señorita Panamá 1999 =

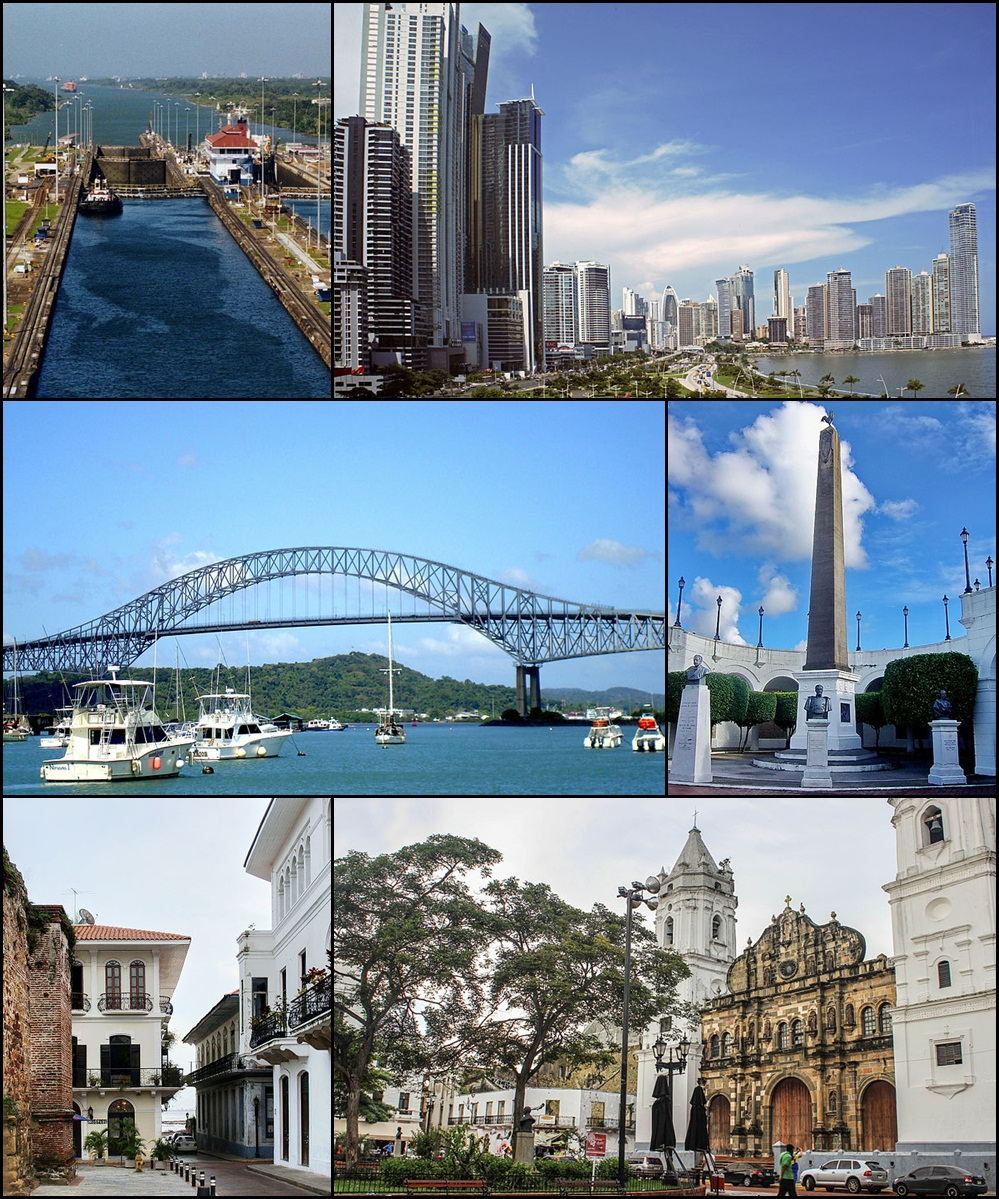
- Panama City host of Señorita Panamá 1999
- Date: September 15, 1999
- Presenters: Lucho Farías & Rossana Uribe
- Venue: Atlapa Convention Centre, Panama City, Panama
- Broadcaster: RPC Televisión
- Entrants: 12
- Placements: 5
- Winner: Analía Núñez Sagripanti; Chiriquí

Señorita Panamá 1999, the 17th Señorita Panamá pageant and 34th celebration of the Miss Panamá contest, was held in Teatro Anayansi Centro de Convenciones Atlapa, Panama City, Panama, on September 15, 1999. After weeks of events. The winner of the pageant was Analía Núñez.

The pageant was broadcast live on RPC Televisión Channel 4. About 12 contestants from all over Panamá competed for the prestigious crown. At the conclusion of the final night of competition, outgoing titleholder Yamani Esther Saied Calviño of Panama Centro crowned Analía Núñez of Chiriquí as the new Señorita Panamá.

In the same night was celebrated the election of the "Señorita Panamá World", was announced the winner of the Señorita Panamá Mundo title. Señorita Panamá World 1998 Lorena del Carmen Zagía Miró of Panama Centro crowned Jessenia Casanova Reyes of Panama Centro as the new Señorita Panamá World. Also was selected the representative for the Miss Asia Pacific pageant Marianela Salazar Panama Centro was crowned by Abimelec Rodríguez of Panama Centro.

Núñez competed in the 49th edition, Miss Universe 2000 pageant, held at the Eleftheria Stadium, Nicosia, Cyprus on May 12, 2000.

In other hands Casanova Reyes competed in Miss World 1999, the 49th edition of the Miss World pageant, was held on 4 December 1999 at the Olympia Hall in London, United Kingdom. Salazar Guillén placed as 1st runner up at Miss Asia Pacific 2000.

== Final result ==
Final results	Contestant
Señorita Panamá 1999	Chiriquí – Analía Núñez Sagripanti
Señorita Panamá World	Panamá Centro – Jessenia Casanova Reyes
Señorita Panamá Asia Pacific	Panama City – Marianela Salazar Guillén
1st Runner up	Panama City – Vanessa Vicuña
2nd Runner up	Panama City – Kenia Meláis

=== Special awards ===
Award	Contestant
Miss Congeniality	Blanca Espinosa
Miss Photogenic	Kenia Meláis
Miss Internet	Analía Núñez
Miss Popularity (chosen by the public)	Mariela Vega Arrivillaga

== Contestants ==
These are the competitors who were selected this year.

#	Represent	Contestant	Age	Height (m)	Hometown
1	Panama City	Blanca Azucena Herrera Araúz	20	1.69	Panama City
2	Panama City	Sadie Vásquez Hernández	24	1.70	Panama City
3	Panama City	Kenia Juliethe Meláis Rondus	23	1.70	Panama City
4	Panama City	Maite Bilbao Grebol	21	1.70	Panama City
5	Panama City	Marianela Salazar Guillén	20	1.70	Panama City
6	Chiriquí	Analía Núñez	20	1.73	David
7	Panama City	Jessenia Casanova Reyes	24	1.75	Panama City
8	Panama City	Vanessa Gioda Vicuña	21	1.78	Panama City
9	Los Santos	Blanca Espinosa	21	1.80	Guararé
10	Panama City	Liz Lara Jimenez	21	1.77	Panama City
11	Colón	Jazmín Anne Scott	22	1.83	Colón
12	Los Santos	Mariela Claudia Vega Arrivillaga	24	1.72	La Villa de Los Santos

== Election schedule ==
- Tuesday September 15, Final night, coronation Señorita Panamá 1999

== Candidates notes ==
- Analía Núñez was 13th overall in the preliminaries in Miss Universe 2000.
- Marianela Salazar represented Panamá in Miss Asia Pacific 2000 where she was the 1st runner-up, Reinado internacional del cafe 2000 also was 1st runner-up; Miss Mesoamerica 2000 2nd runner-up and Miss Hawaiian Tropic.
- Blanca Herrera become a recognized TV Host in Panama.

== Historical significance ==
- Chiriquí won Señorita Panamá for the first time.
