= Gabriela González (Miss Panama) =

Panamanian model (born 2006)

- Born: Gabriela Lineth González del Valle; July 2, 2006 (age 20); David, Chiriquí, Panama
- Beauty pageant titleholder
- Title: Miss Chiriquí 2026; Señorita Panamá 2026
- Major competitions: Señorita Panamá 2026; (Winner); Miss Universe 2026; (TBD)

Gabriela Lineth González del Valle (born July 2, 2006) is a Panamanian beauty pageant titleholder who won Señorita Panamá 2026. She will represent Panama at Miss Universe 2026.

== Early life and education ==
González was born on July 2, 2006, in David, Chiriquí, to Panamanian television presenter Aelleen del Valle. She graduated from San Agustín High School in 2024. She studies at the University of Panama, majoring in medical studies. In addition to her major, she developed an interest in painting and modeling. She is proficient in English and has worked as a tutor, teaching English, mathematics, and science to primary school children.

== Pageantry ==
In April 2026, González entered Señorita Panamá 2026 as the representative of Chiriquí Province. At the finals, she was named the winner, succeeding Mirna Caballini, who represented the same province in her edition. As the winner of the competition's top title, she will represent Panama at Miss Universe 2026.

Awards and achievements
Preceded by Mirna Caballini (Chiriquí Province)	Señorita Panamá; 2026	Incumbent
Preceded by Mirna Caballini	Miss Chiriquí; 2026	Incumbent
