= Karla Peniche =

- Born: Karla Isabel Peniche Hernández; April 17, 1988 (age 38); Cozumel, Quintana Roo, Mexico
- Occupations: Actress and model
- Title: Rostro de México 2014; Miss Caraïbes Hibiscus 2015; Miss Global Mexico 2017

Karla Isabel Peniche Hernández (born April 17, 1988) is a Mexican actress, model and beauty pageant titleholder who won the Miss Caraïbes Hibiscus 2015 title.

== Career ==
Peniche is best known for her roles in Mexican telenovelas produced by Televisa, including her portrayal of Brenda Martínez in Jenni Rivera: Mariposa de Barrio (2017) and an appearance in La mujer de mi vida (2024). She graduated from the Centro de Educación Artística (CEA), Televisa's acting school, and has worked extensively in soap operas such as Como Dice el Dicho and La Rosa de Guadalupe, often portraying supporting characters in dramatic storylines. In addition to acting, she serves as a television host and has skills in singing, dancing, and modeling, as represented by her talent agency.

=== Pageantry ===
In 2014, Peniche began her national pageant career by winning El Rostro de Mexico title, which made her Mexico's representative at the Miss Caraïbes Hibiscus, where she placed as first runner-up. The following year, Peniche was awarded Miss Caraïbes Hibiscus 2015, marking the first time a Mexican contestant claimed this international crown. In 2017, she was appointed to represent her country at the Miss Global, where placed to the Top 10.

Awards and achievements
Preceded by Rubí Chaparro	Miss Global Mexico; 2017	Succeeded by Grecia Montañez
Preceded by (Colombia) María Alejandra López	Miss Caraïbes Hibiscus; 2015	Succeeded by Incumbent
Preceded by Catalina Méndez Recio	Rostro de México; 2014	Succeeded by Paulina Flores Cantú
