= Señorita Panamá 1998 =

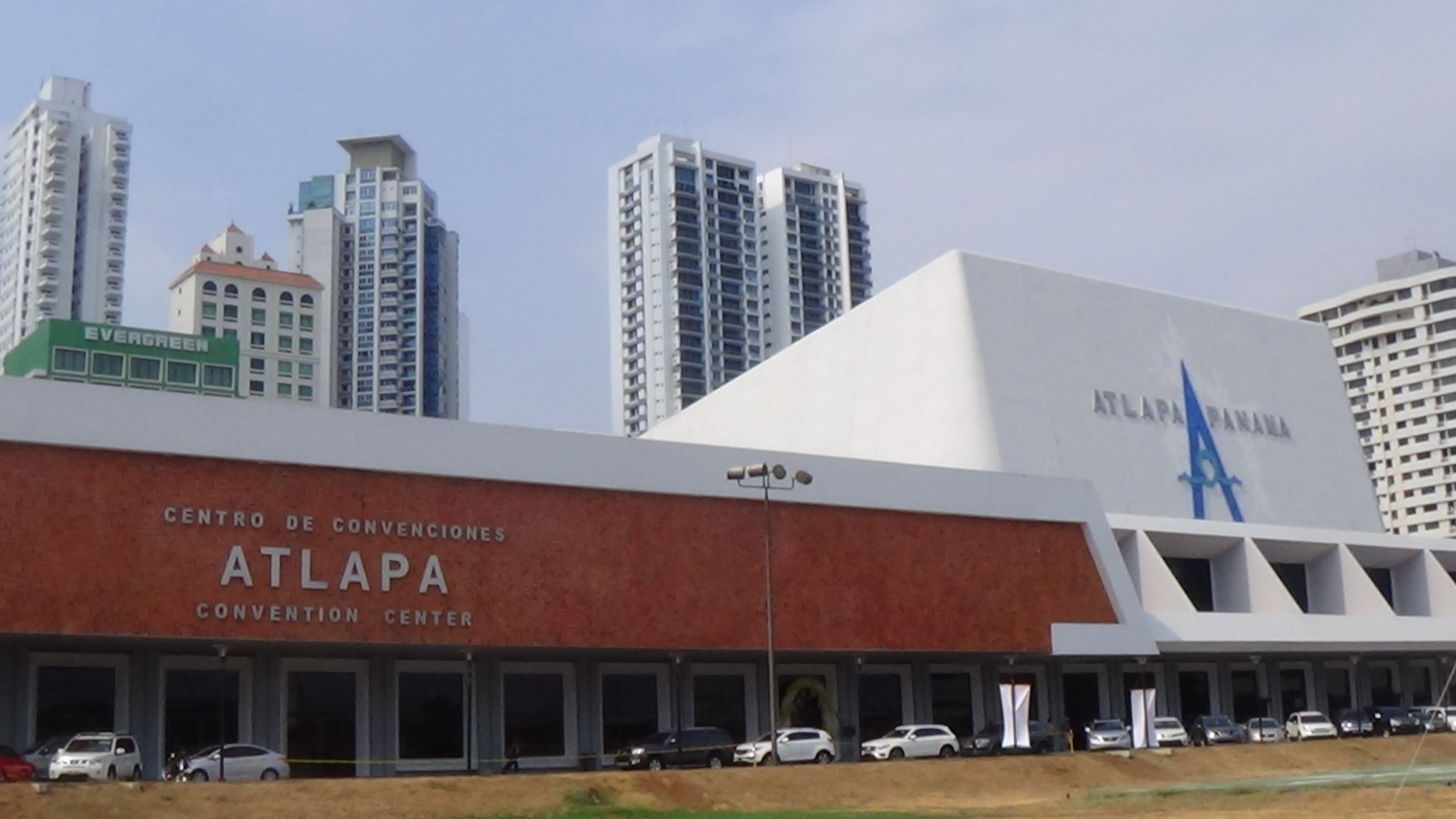
- Atlapa, venue of Señorita Panamá 1998
- Date: September 5, 1998
- Entertainment: Yigo Sugasti, Diny, Estefano and Donato & Myriam Hernández
- Venue: Atlapa Convention Centre, Panama City, Panama
- Broadcaster: RPC Televisión
- Entrants: 13
- Placements: 5
- Winner: Yamani Esther Saied Calviño; Panamá Centro

Señorita Panamá 1998, the 16th Señorita Panamá pageant and 33rd celebration of the Miss Panamá contest, was held in Teatro Anayansi Centro de Convenciones Atlapa, Panama City, Panama, on Saturday, September 5, 1998, after weeks of events. The winner of the pageant was Yamani Saied.

The pageant was broadcast live on RPC Televisión. About 14 contestants from all over Panama competed for the prestigious crown. At the conclusion of the final night of competition, outgoing titleholder Tanisha Drummond of Colón crowned Yamani Saied of Panama Centro as the new Señorita Panamá.

In the same night was celebrated the election of the "Señorita Panamá World", was announced the winner of the Señorita Panamá Mundo title. Señorita Panamá World 1997 Patricia Aurora Bremner Hernández of Panama Centro crowned Lorena del Carmen Zagía Miró of Panama Centro as the new Señorita Panamá World. Also was selected the representative for the Miss Asia Pacific pageant Abimelec Rodríguez Fernández of Panama City was crowned by Monica Herrador Gonzalez 1st runner-up of Miss Panama 1997 of Panama City.

Saied competed in the 48th edition, Miss Universe 1999 pageant, held at the Chaguaramas Convention Centre, Chaguaramas, Trinidad and Tobago on May 26, 1999.

== Result ==
=== Placements ===
Placement	Contestant
Señorita Panamá 1998	Panama City – Yamani Saied
Señorita Panamá World 1998	Panama City – Lorena del Carmen Zagía
Señorita Panamá Asia Pacific 1998	Panama City – Abimelec Rodríguez
1st Runner-Up	Panama City – Raquel Rubio
2nd Runner-Up	Panama City – Maria de los Angeles

=== Special awards ===
Final results	Designer	Topic
Best National Costume to Miss Universe	Charles Branan Jaén	"Diablo Sucio"

== Contestants ==
These are the competitors who have been selected this year.

#	Represent	Contestant	Age	Height (m)	Hometown
1	Panama City	Raquel Rubio	-	-	Panama City
2	Panama City	Maria de los Angeles Solis	-	-	Panama City
3	Panama City	Abimelec Rodríguez Fernández	20	-	Panama City
4	Panama City	Yamani Saied Calviño	-	1.75	Panama City
5	Panama City	Lorena del Carmen Zagía Miró	-	-	Panama City
6	Panama City	Yira Gorrichategui	23	-	Panama City
7	Panama City	Teresa Rivas	-	-	Panama City
8	Panama City	Anabella Sibauste	-	-	Panama City
9	Panama City	Diana Roca	-	-	Panama City
10	Panama City	Marichell Rodriguez	-	-	Panama City
11	Panama City	Guadalupe Solis	-	-	Panama City
12	Panama City	Glinka Pinate Thirwall	-	-	Panama City
13	Panama City	Yenela Aguilar	-	-	Panama City

== Election schedule ==
- Saturday September 5 final night, the Señorita Panamá's (Yamani Saied) coronation was celebrated in 1998.

== Candidates notes ==
Yamani Saied is considered one of the most delicate and beautiful Panamanian models. Panamanian folks started referring to her as the ''Señorita Panama.'' in 1998.

== Historical significance ==
- In the Panamá Centro won Señorita Panamá for 19th time in 1998.
