= Shvetha Jaishankar =

Indian model and entrepreneur (born 1978)

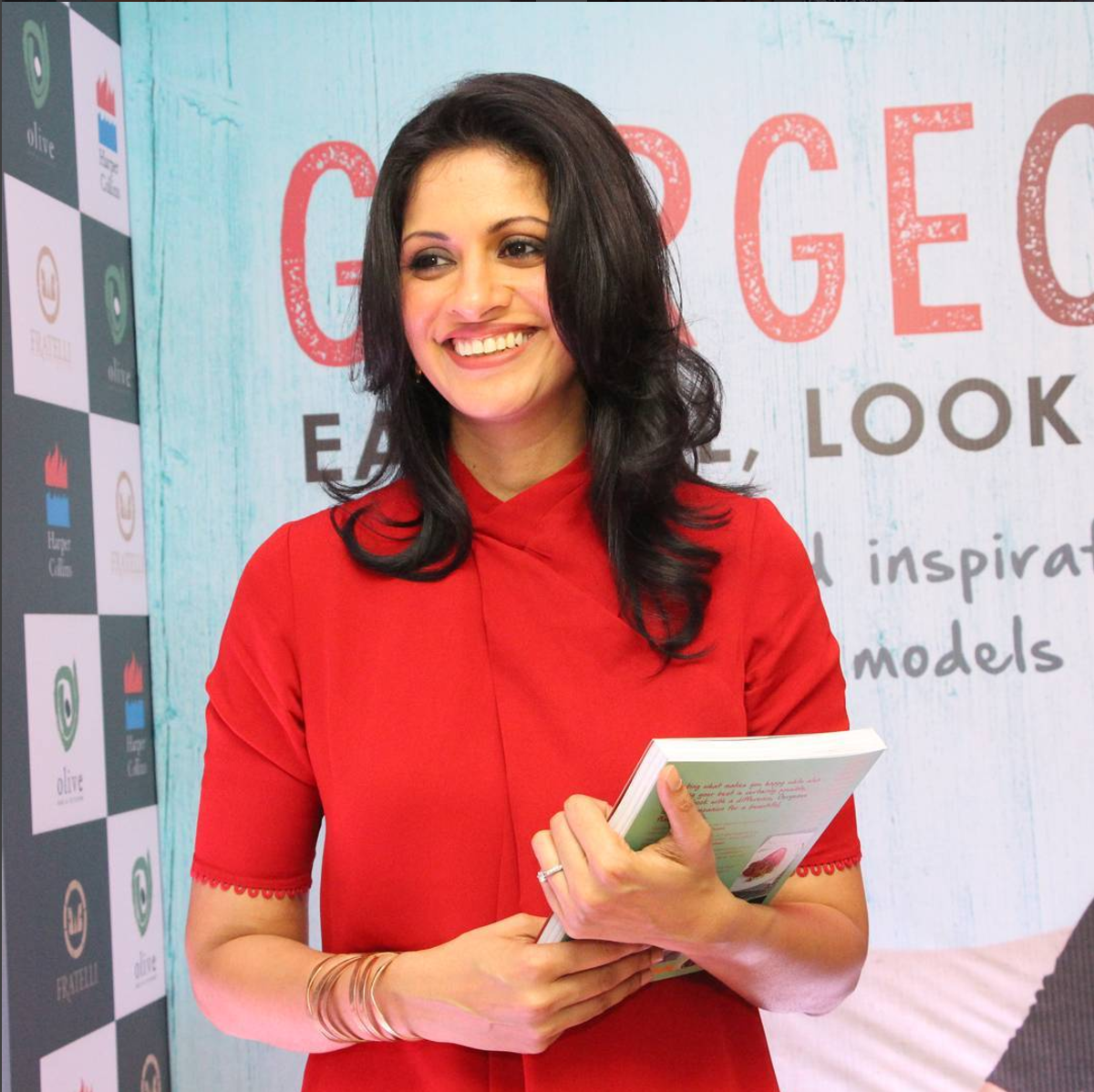
- Born: 11 December 1978 (age 47); Chennai, Tamil Nadu, India
- Education: Ethiraj College for Women, Chennai; Indian School of Business, Hyderabad
- Occupations: Model; Author
- Spouses: Mahesh Bhupathi (m. 2002; div. 2010); Raghu Kailas (m. 2011)
- Writing career
- Years active: 1995–present
- Notable work: Gorgeous: Eat Well, Look Great
- Notable awards: Miss India International 1998 Miss International 1998 (Second runner up)
- Website: shvethajaishankar.com

Shvetha Jaishankar (born 11 December 1978) is an Indian model, author, entrepreneur, writer, dancer and beauty pageant titleholder. She won the title at the Femina Miss India International 1998 and later was crowned as the second runner up at Miss International 1998 held in Tokyo.

She is the author of Gorgeous: Eat Well, Look Great published by HarperCollins in 2016, which won the 'Best in the World in Food Culture' prize at The Gourmand Awards in 2018.

Shvetha is also a founding trustee of Leap in India, a movement mentored by A. R. Rahman and founded by musician Srinivas Krishnan, that develops and conducts immersive music and arts programs in schools.

== Personal life ==
Shvetha was born in Chennai to Tamil Brahmin parents. She is the only child of her mother, a retired physician and pharmaceutical entrepreneur, and her father, a businessman in the clinical trials industry. She completed her schooling at the Sacred Heart Matriculation School in Church Park, Chennai, and DAV School. She graduated from Ethiraj College for Women with a B.A. Corporate in 1999 and pursued her MBA in 2004 from Indian School of Business, Hyderabad, after which she co-founded sports and talent management company Globosport.

Shvetha is short for Shvethambari; she takes her name from the Tanjore painting of Goddess Saraswati, which is in her mother's personal collection. Music dance and tennis were integral to her formative years.

In 2002, Shvetha married tennis player Mahesh Bhupathi; they divorced in 2010.

In 2011, Shvetha married Chennai-based businessman Raghu Kailas. The couple have two daughters and live in Chennai.

== Career ==
=== Modelling ===
At age 17, Shvetha was discovered by fashion guru Prasad Bidapa and went on to walk the ramp for India's top designers such as Ritu Kumar, Rohit Bal and Manish Malhotra. She won the Femina Miss India International 1998 title and later was crowned as the second runner up at the Miss International 1998 held in Tokyo, Japan.

She has appeared on shows for National Geographic, MTV and Star TV. She was guest presenter at the Nat Geo Spell Bee 2009. She has appeared in TV commercials for Dabur Vatika shampoo, Nestle Munch, Cadbury’s Dairy Milk, Asian Paints and Denim Soap.

She has also appeared on a famous talk show Rendezvous with Simi Garewal. She appeared on the cover of Femina (December 1999 issue) and has also featured in Elle, Verve and Vogue India magazines.

=== Author and writer ===
Shvetha's debut book, Gorgeous, was published by HarperCollins India in 2016. The book won the 'Best in the World in Food Culture' prize at The Gourmand Awards in 2018. It is a collection of recipes and conversations with India's top models and actors like Malaika Arora, Priyanka Chopra, Milind Soman, Trisha Krishnan, Gul Panag, Ujjwala Raut and several others. The book chronicles Shvetha's battle with weight and food related issues caused by anxiety in her life and addresses the importance of taking care of yourself by prioritizing fitness and well-being. It also celebrates the importance of delicious food in everyday living in order to stay the course on eating right. There are over 100 recipes in the book that also features Shvetha's own recipes and anecdotes from her life.

She was a popular columnist for The Hindu, a leading national newspaper. She wrote several features for 'The Girls Guide' and 'The Yin Thing' columns.

=== Sports management ===
In 2004, Shvetha co-founded and managed Globosport, a sports and talent management company along with Mahesh Bhupathi. In 2012, she joined Reliance Industries Limited as vice president, where she was part of the core team that handled the strategic and operational aspirations of the group's sports ventures including the cricket team Mumbai Indians. Shvetha is the founding editor of the IPL magazine (Indian Premier League), the world's biggest and most popular 20-20 cricket league. The magazine contained exclusive photographs, interviews of top IPL players and a sneak peek into the events that are organized around the IPL extravaganza.

=== Reinvention ===
In 2024, after a 20-year hiatus, Shvetha walked the ramp at India fashion week and India couture week for top designers Tarun Tahiliani, Rahul Mishra making her a role model for people who believe that reinvention as a path to purpose. https://www.indulgexpress.com/fashion/new-launches/2024/Jul/26/runway-return-explore-shvetha-jaishankars-inspiring-journey-and-richa-goenkas-exquisite-designs-that-empower-women-through-fashion.

=== Other ===
Shvetha has spoken at several workshops and clubs on her beliefs on healthy living and the need to follow dreams. Addresses include the students at Pearl Academy of Fashion during their Induction, the Rotary Club of Madras, the Duchess Club, and a workshop for college students from Nagaland.
