= Miss Caraïbes Hibiscus =

Beauty contest

Miss Caraïbes Hibiscus was an annual international beauty contest for all countries of the Caribbean and the Americas. It was founded in 1990 in the French part of Saint Martin and ran until 2014; the last winning contestant being awarded the 2015 sash. In 2022, founder Patrick Eugène stated it was his intention to relaunch the contest in 2023.

== TitleHolders ==
Year	Name	Country	Host country
2015	Karla Peniche Hernández	Mexico	St Martin
2014	María Alejandra López	Colombia	St Martin
2013	Brigitte Golabkan	Guadeloupe	St Martin
2012	Élody Pradel	Guadeloupe	St Martin
2011	Olivia Pinheiro	Bolivia	St Martin
2010	Tineffa Naisso	French Guiana	St Martin
2009	Yoly Hawley	St Martin	St Martin
2008	Angenie Simon	Curaçao	St Martin
2007	Laurien Angelista	Curaçao	St Martin
2006	Laurynes Chatenay	French Guiana	St Martin
2005	Fiorella Flores	Peru	St Martin
2004	Liesel Holler	Peru	St Martin
2003	Renee Sloane-Seale	Trinidad & Tobago	St Martin
2002	Resma Sooden	Trinidad & Tobago	St Martin
2001	Griselle Santos	Puerto Rico	St Martin
2000	Olga Flórez	Colombia	St Martin
1999	Diluvina Hera	Venezuela	St Martin
1998	Tanisha Drummond	Panama	St Martin
1997	Pamela Semmache	Martinique	St Martin
1996	Sharda Ramlogan	Trinidad & Tobago	St Martin
1995	Ludmilla Canourgues	Guadeloupe	St Martin
1994	Fabiola Laclé	Aruba	St Martin
1993	Rachel Stuart	Jamaica	St Martin
1991	Christine Marie Luce	Martinique	St Martin
1990	María Martínez	Dominican Republic	St Martin

== Ranking ==
Country	Titles	Winning years
Guadeloupe	3	1995, 2012, 2013
Trinidad & Tobago	3	1996, 2002, 2003
Colombia	2	2000, 2014
French Guiana	2	2006, 2010
Curaçao	2	2007, 2008
Peru	2	2004, 2005
Martinique	2	1991, 1997
Mexico	1	2015
Bolivia	1	2011
St Martin	1	2009
Puerto Rico	1	2001
Venezuela	1	1999
Panama	1	1998
Aruba	1	1994
Jamaica	1	1993
Dominican Republic	1	1990
