= Las Tablas, Los Santos =

Las Tablas
- City
- Santa Librada de Las Tablas
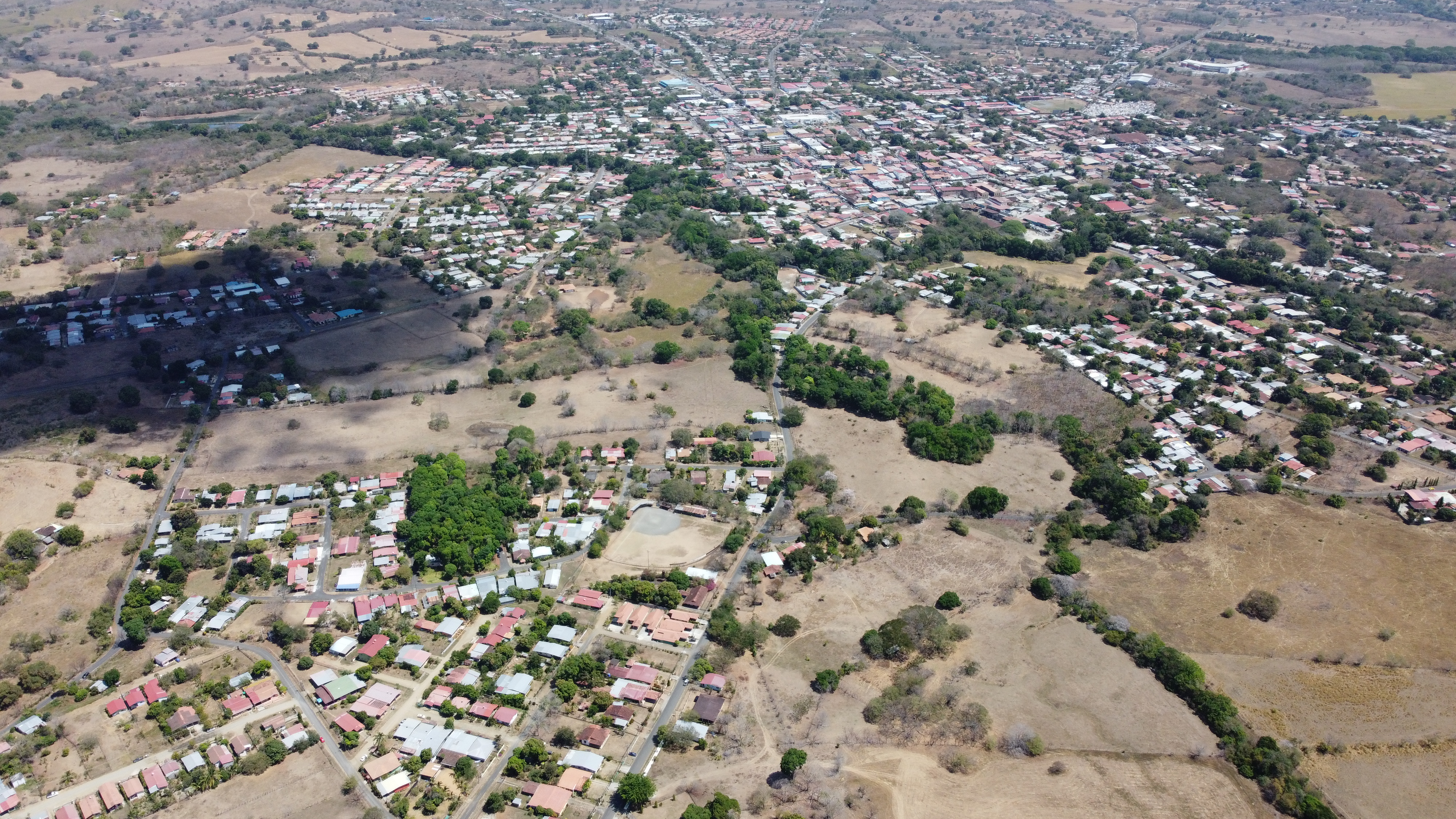

- Location within Panama
- Coordinates: 7°46′N 80°17′W
- Country: Panama
- Province: Los Santos
- District: Las Tablas
- Founded: 1671

Area
  - Land: 7.5 km^{2} (2.9 sq mi)
- Elevation: 42 m (138 ft)

Population (2010)
  - Total: 9,255
  - Density: 1,197.6/km^{2} (3,102/sq mi)
- Population density calculated based on land area.
- Time zone: UTC−5 (EST)
- Climate: Aw

Las Tablas (Spanish pronunciation: [las ˈta.βlas]) is the capital of the Panamanian province of Los Santos, with a population of 9,255 as of 2010. It is located a few kilometres inland from the Gulf of Panama on the Azuero Peninsula. Las Tablas is a recognised national centre of Panamanian folk: Art, music, gastronomy, architecture, culture and literature. Belisario Porras, the only Panamanian president to serve three terms, was from Las Tablas.

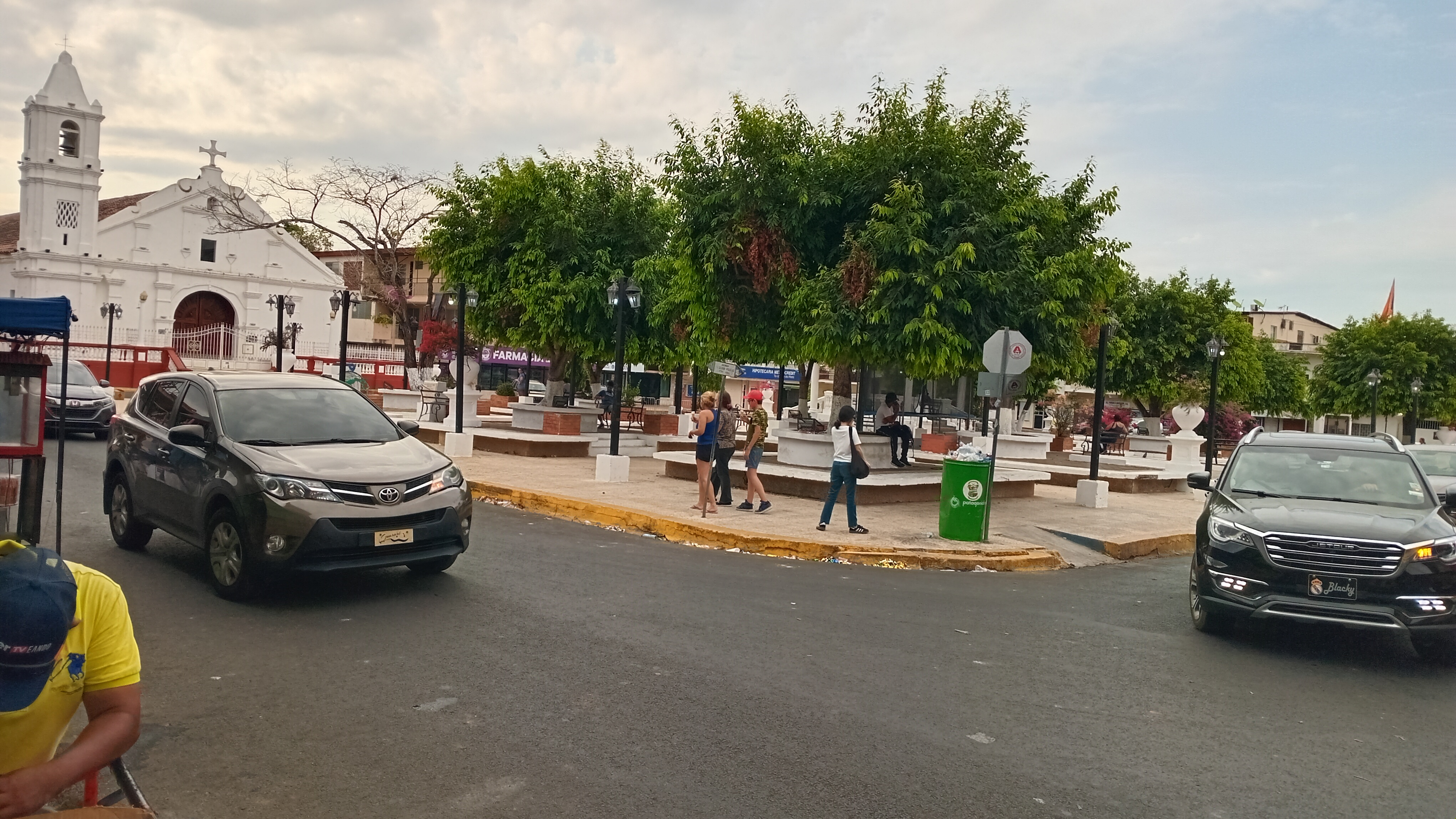
Belisario Porras Barahona Park, popularly known as Porras Park

It is known for a lively yearly Carnival, in which the city splits into two competing factions, "Calle Arriba" (Uptown, literally "Street Above") and "Calle Abajo" (Downtown / Street Below), both centred on two streets of the same name. Each faction will have a carnival queen, a parade, fireworks, music, a decorated plaza, food stands, presentations, concerts, surveys, games, contests, etc., all attempting to overpower the other faction's efforts.

== Etymology ==
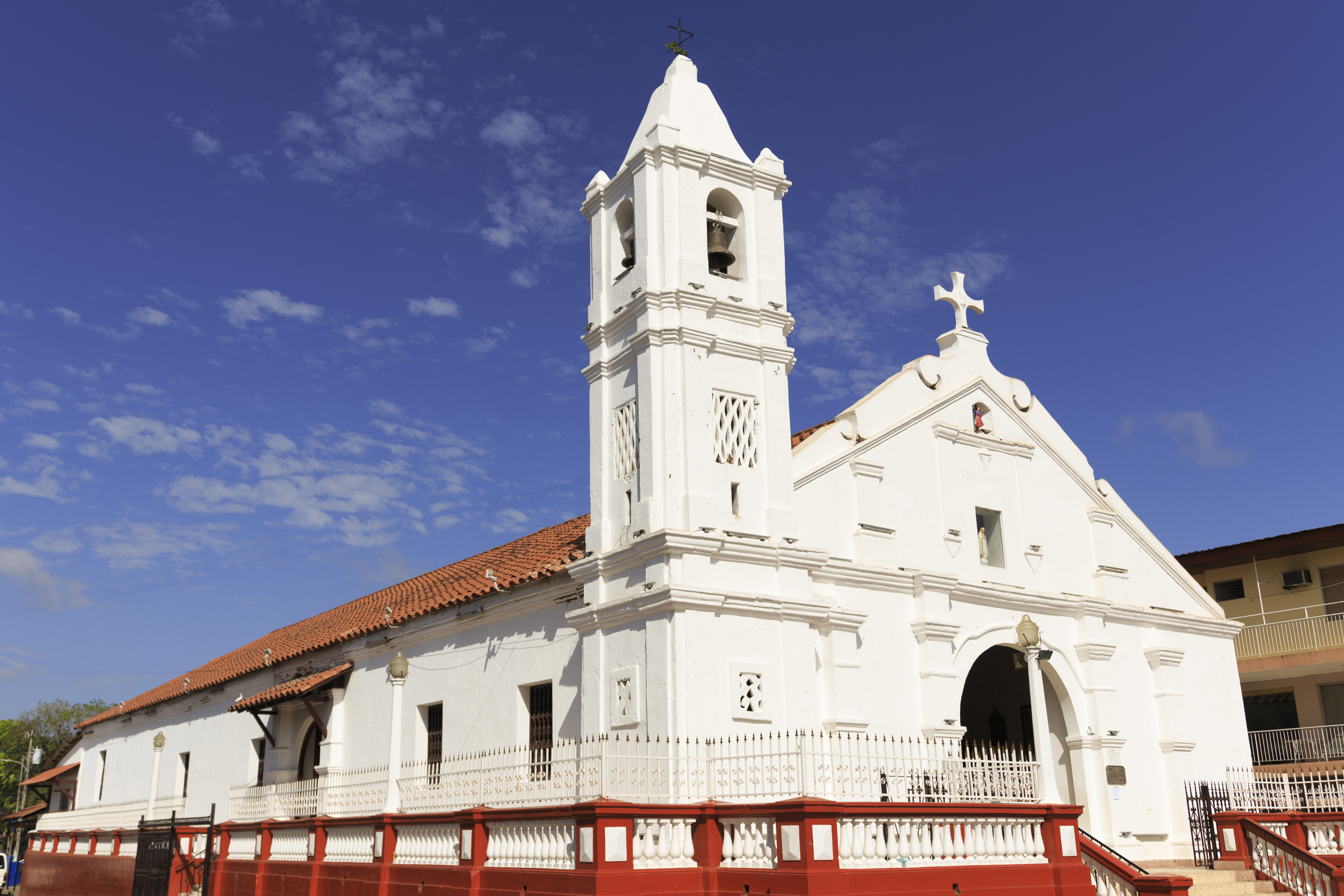
Santa Librada church

According to folklore, the town takes its name, which translates as "The Boards", from planks of wood salvaged from a Spanish ship used to construct the first houses in the town. The ship had run aground on the coast near the city's future location after fleeing Panama City before the arrival of Henry Morgan.

== Notable persons ==
=== Miss International ===
Lía Borrero, Miss International 1998
