= Tanisha Drummond =

Panamanian model (born 1976)

- Born: Tanisha Tamara Drummond Johnson; August 3, 1976 (age 50); Colón, Panama
- Height: 1.78 m (5 ft 10 in)
- Beauty pageant titleholder
- Title: Miss Panama Universe 1997; Miss Caraïbes Hibiscus 1998
- Hair color: Black
- Eye color: hazel
- Major competitions: Señorita Panamá 1997 (Winner); Miss Universe 1998 (Unplaced); Miss Caraïbes Hibiscus 1998 (Winner)

Tanisha Tamara Drummond Johnson (born August 3, 1976) is a Panamanian model and beauty pageant titleholder who won the Señorita Panamá 1997. She also represented Panama in Miss Universe 1998, the 47th Miss Universe pageant which was held at Stan Sheriff Arena, Honolulu, Hawaii, United States on May 12, 1998.

Drummond who is 5 ft 10 in (1.78 m) tall, competed in the national beauty pageant Señorita Panamá 1997, in September 1997 and obtained the title of Señorita Panamá Universo. She represented Colón.

== Miss Caraïbes Hibiscus ==
In the same year, Drummond competed for Panama in the Miss Caraïbes Hibiscus 1998 and won the title. This was the first title for Panama in this pageant.

Awards and achievements
Preceded by Lía Borrero	Miss Panamá; 1997	Succeeded by Yamani Saied
Preceded by (Martinique) Pamela Semmache	Miss Caraïbes Hibiscus; 1998	Succeeded by (Venezuela) Diluvina Hera
