= Miss International 1998 =

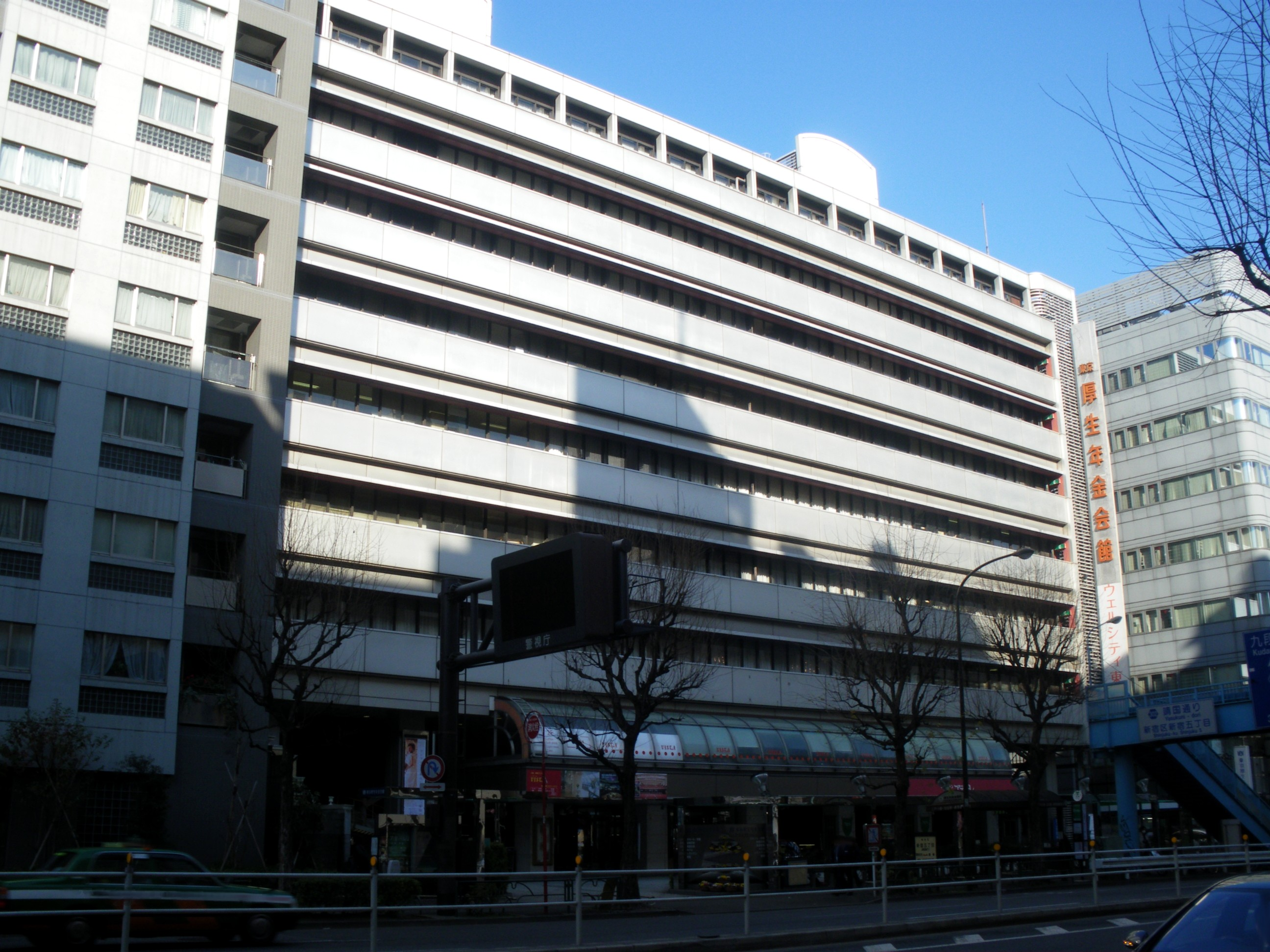
- Date: September 26, 1998
- Presenters: Masumi Okada
- Venue: Koseinenkin Hall, Tokyo, Japan
- Broadcaster: TV Tokyo
- Entrants: 43
- Placements: 15
- Debuts: Latvia
- Withdrawals: Brazil; Guatemala; Lebanon; Macau; Malta; Puerto Rico; Russia; Ukraine
- Returns: Cyprus; Holland; Iceland; Macedonia; Norway; Panama; Senegal; Togo
- Winner: Lía Borrero; Panama

Miss International 1998 was the 38th Miss International pageant, held at the Koseinenkin Hall in Tokyo, Japan on 26 September 1998.

Lía Borrero of Panama won and was crowned by Consuelo Adler of Venezuela. It is the first time Panama has won the pageant.

Contestants from forty-three countries and territories participated in the pageant, which was hosted by Masumi Okada.

== Results ==
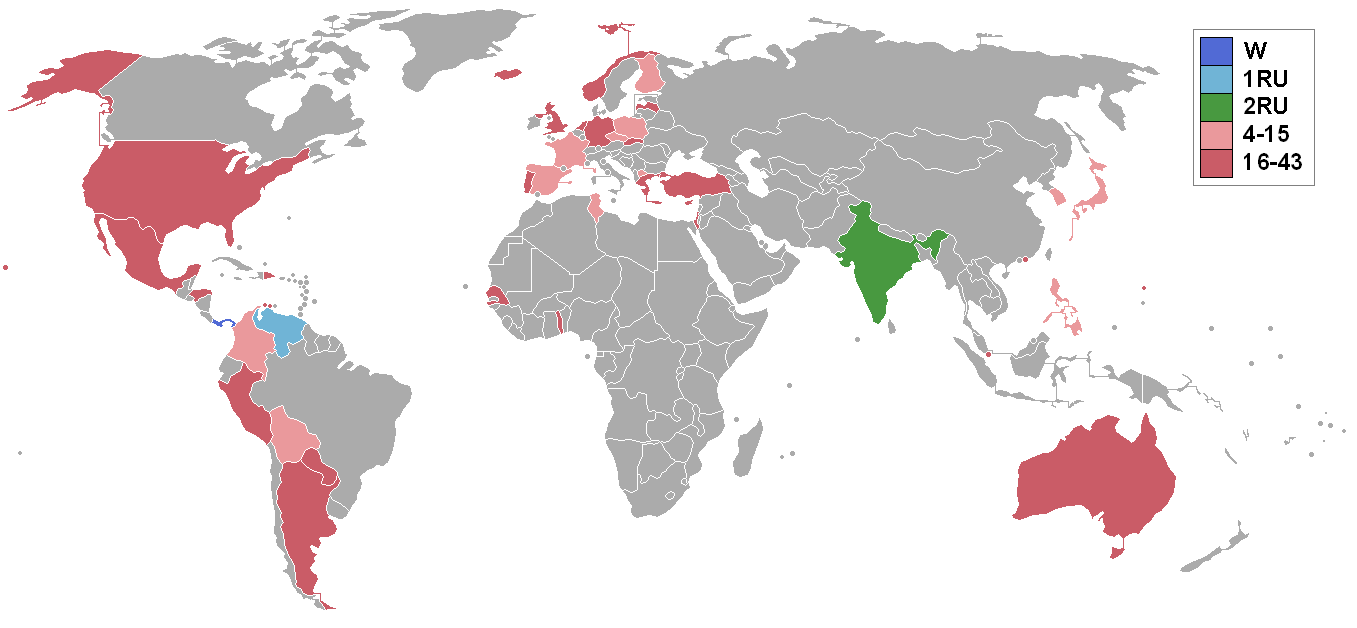
Miss International 1998 participating countries and territories.

=== Placements ===
Placement	Contestant
Miss International 1998	Panama – Lía Borrero
1st runner-up	Venezuela – Daniela Kosán
2nd runner-up	India – Shvetha Jaishankar
Top 15	Bolivia – Liliana Peña; Colombia – Adriana Hurtado; Czech Republic – Petra Faltýnová; Finland – Piia Hartikainen; France – Patricia Spéhar; Japan – Megumi Taira; Macedonia – Ana Binovska; Philippines – Colette Centeno; Poland – Agnieszka Osinska; South Korea – Cho Hye-young; Spain – Vanessa Romero; Tunisia – Nejla Kouniali

=== Special awards ===
Award	Contestant
Miss Friendship	Finland – Piia Hartikainen; Togo – Manuella Nadou Lawson-Body
Best National Costume	Colombia – Adriana Hurtado
Miss Photogenic	Venezuela – Daniela Kosán

== Contestants ==
Forty-three contestants competed for the title.

Country/Territory	Contestant	Age (Note: Ages during the competition)	Hometown
Argentina	Maria Fernanda Ortiz	–	Buenos Aires
Aruba	Anushka Sheritsa Lew Jen Tai	18	Oranjestad
Australia	Katherine O'Brien	18	Sydney
Bolivia	Liliana Peña	18	Litoral
Colombia	Adriana Hurtado	21	Valle de Cauca
Curaçao	Santa Indris Tokaay	–	Willemstad
Cyprus	Marianna Panayiotou	–	Nicosia
Czech Republic	Petra Faltýnová	21	Prague
Dominican Republic	Sorangel Fersobe	20	San Juan de la Maguana
Finland	Piia Hartikainen	20	Rovaniemi
France	Patricia Spéhar	23	Paris
Germany	Fiona Ammann	–	Berlin
Great Britain	Melanie Devina Jones	20	Ewloe
Greece	Eleni Pliatsika	–	Athens
Hawaii	Lori-Ann Lee Medeiros	–	Honolulu
Holland	Ilona Marilyn van Veldhuisen	22	Amsterdam
Honduras	Wendy Suyapa Rodríguez	–	Cortés
Hong Kong	Natalie Ng	–	Hong Kong
Iceland	Gudbjörg Sigridur Hermannsdóttir	–	Reykjavík
India	Shvetha Jaishankar	17	Chennai
Israel	Galia Abramov	–	Tel Aviv
Japan	Megumi Taira	–	Tokyo
Latvia	Līga Graudumniece	–	Riga
Macedonia	Ana Binovska	–	Skopje
Mexico	Karina Mora	17	Mérida
Northern Mariana Islands	Sonya Pangelinan	–	Saipan
Norway	Bjørg Sofie Løvstad	18	Akershus
Panama	Lía Borrero	22	Las Tablas
Paraguay	Maria Fabiola Roig	19	Asunción
Peru	Melissa Miranda	–	Tacna
Philippines	Colette Centeno	17	Manila
Poland	Agnieszka Osinska	20	Frampol
Portugal	Icilia Berenguel	21	Póvoa de Varzim
Senegal	Maimouna Diallo	–	Dakar
Singapore	Sudha Menon	21	Singapore
Slovakia	Martina Kalmanová	–	Bratislava
South Korea	Cho Hye-young	–	Seoul
Spain	Vanessa Romero	20	Alicante
Togo	Manuella Nadou Lawson-Body	–	Lomé
Tunisia	Nejla Kouniali	–	Tunis
Turkey	Senay Akay	18	Istanbul
United States	Susan Paez	22	South Gate
Venezuela	Daniela Kosán	24	Maracay
