= Ivette Cordovez =

Panamanian model (born 1979)

- Born: Ivette María Cordovez Usuga; June 24, 1979 (age 46); Panama City, Panama
- Beauty pageant titleholder
- Hair color: Brunette
- Eye color: Green

Ivette María Cordovez Usuga (born June 24, 1979) is a Panamanian actress, TV host, model and beauty pageant titleholder who was the winner of Señorita Panamá 2001. She started her acting career after participating in beauty pageants.

== Pageant career ==
Cordovez competed in the national beauty pageant Señorita Panamá 2000, on Thursday September 1, 2000 and obtained the title of Señorita Panamá Universo.

Ivette went on to represent Panama in Miss Universe 2001, which took place in Puerto Rico. She was the official representative of Panama in the 50th Miss Universe 2001 pageant, held at Coliseo Rubén Rodríguez, Bayamón, Puerto Rico on May 11, 2001.

== Acting career ==
She worked in TV soap-operas and miniseries.

In 2008 she worked in the comedic Mexican telenovela Las Tontas No Van al Cielo which was successful in Latin America. After finishing filming with Las Tontas No Van al Cielo, Cordovez worked in Sortilegio, the popular series La Rosa de Guadalupe and Central de Abastos, among others.

== Television ==
- 2009: Sortilegio
- 2008: Las Tontas No Van al Cielo
- 2008: Cuidado con el ángel
- 2008: En nombre del amor
- 2008: Un gancho al corazón
- 2007: Palabra de Mujer

== Theatre ==
Cordovez returned to Panama in 2011 and participated in the female version of Neil Simon's The Odd Couple, where she played Vera.

== TVN ==
Ivette Cordovez is currently working as an executive at TVN. There she set up an Acting for TV course, directed by Alejandra Israel, the former Televisa's acting teacher.

She started as the news presenter for TVN Weekend News in November 2011.

Awards and achievements
Preceded by Analía Núñez	Miss Panamá; 2000–2001	Succeeded by Justine Pasek
