= Yamani Saied =

Panamanian model

- Born: Yamani Esther Saied Calviño; May 12, 1978 (age 48); Panama City, Panama
- Height: 1.76 m (5 ft 9 1/2 in)
- Beauty pageant titleholder
- Title: Miss Panama Universe 1998
- Hair color: Black
- Eye color: hazel
- Major competitions: Señorita Panamá 1998 (Winner); Miss Universe 1999 (Unplaced).

Yamani Esther Saied Calviño (born May 12, 1978) is a Panamanian model and beauty pageant titleholder who won the Señorita Panamá 1998. She also represented Panama in the Miss Universe 1999, the 48th Miss Universe. The pageant was held at Chaguaramas Convention Centre, Chaguaramas, Trinidad and Tobago on May 26, 1999.

Saied, who is of Lebanese origin, is 5 ft 9.5 in (1.77 m) tall. She competed in the national beauty pageant Señorita Panamá 1998, in September 1998 and obtained the title of Señorita Panamá Universo. She represented Panamá Centro state.

Her start in the modeling world took place when she joined the "Chica Modelo" (a model search) contest in 1996 where she won at 15 years. She is also a recognized TV host in Panama.

Awards and achievements
Preceded by Tanisha Drummond	Miss Panamá; 1998-1999	Succeeded by Analía Núñez
