= Señorita Panamá 1995 =

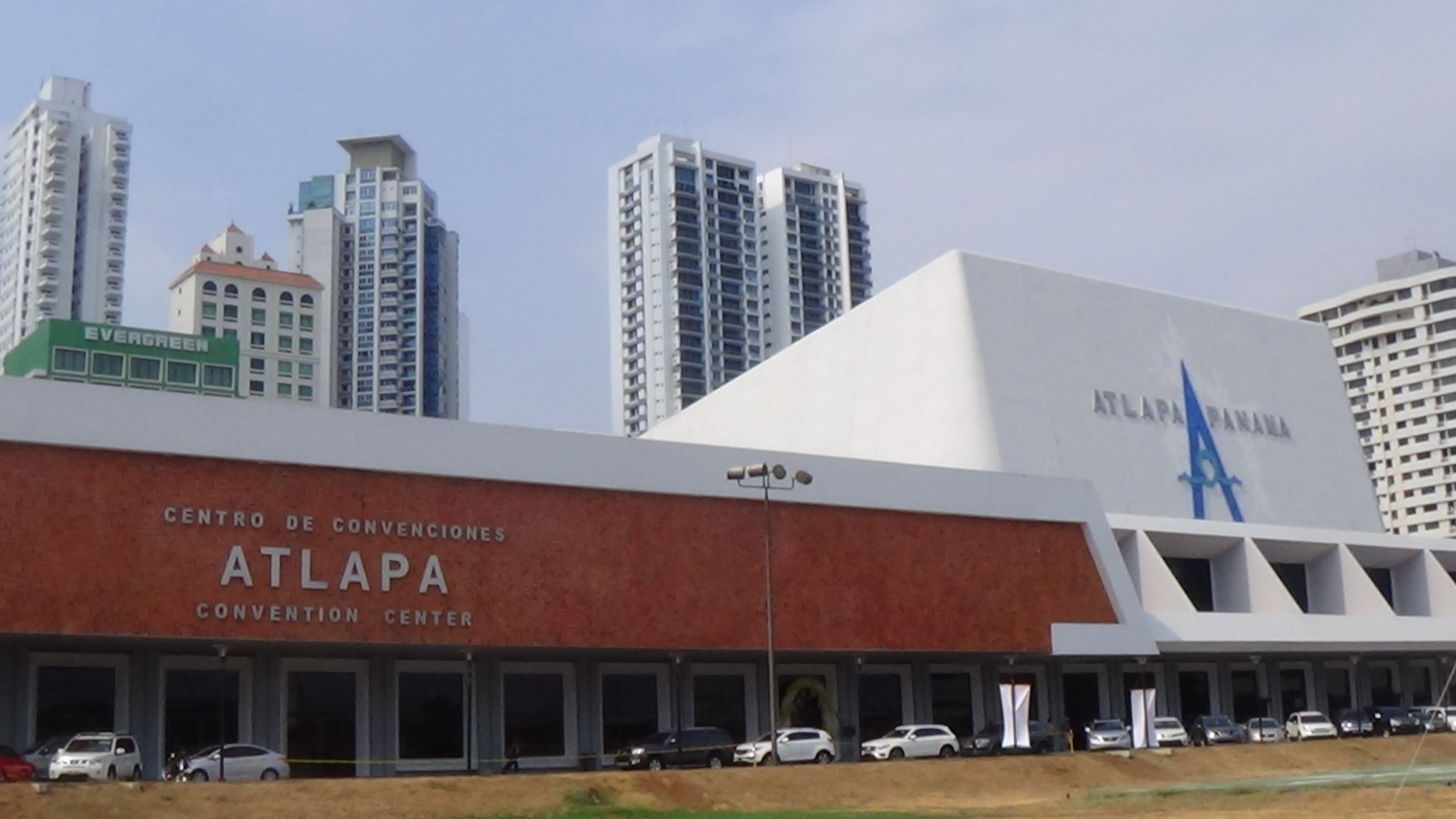
- Atlapa, venue of Señorita Panamá 1995
- Date: September 1995
- Presenters: Luis Farias & Madelaine Leignadier
- Entertainment: Alexander, Ana Lucia Herrera, Patricia Manterola, Emmanuel & Charlie Masso
- Venue: Teatro Anayansi Centro de Convenciones Atlapa, Panama City, Panama
- Broadcaster: RPC Televisión
- Entrants: 16
- Placements: 5
- Winner: Reina del Carmen Royo Rivera; Panamá Centro

Señorita Panamá 1995, the 13th Señorita Panamá pageant and 30th celebration of the Miss Panamá contest, was held in Teatro Anayansi Atlapa Convention Centre, Panama City, Panama, September 1995, after weeks of events. The winner of the pageant was Reyna del Carmen Royo Rivera.

The pageant was broadcast live on RPC Televisión. About 16 contestants from all over Panama competed for the crown. At the conclusion of the final night of competition, outgoing titleholder Michele Sage of Panamá Centro crowned Reyna Royo of Panamá Centro as the new Señorita Panamá.

Also Moreno Montero competed in Miss World 1995, the 45th edition of the Miss World pageant, was held on 18 November 1995 for the fourth straight year at the Sun City Entertainment Centre in Sun City, South Africa. De León was supposed to compete in Miss Hispanidad 1996 but the contest was finally canceled and was sent to Miss Asia Pacific 1997 pageant held on December 6, 1997 in Davao City, Philippines.

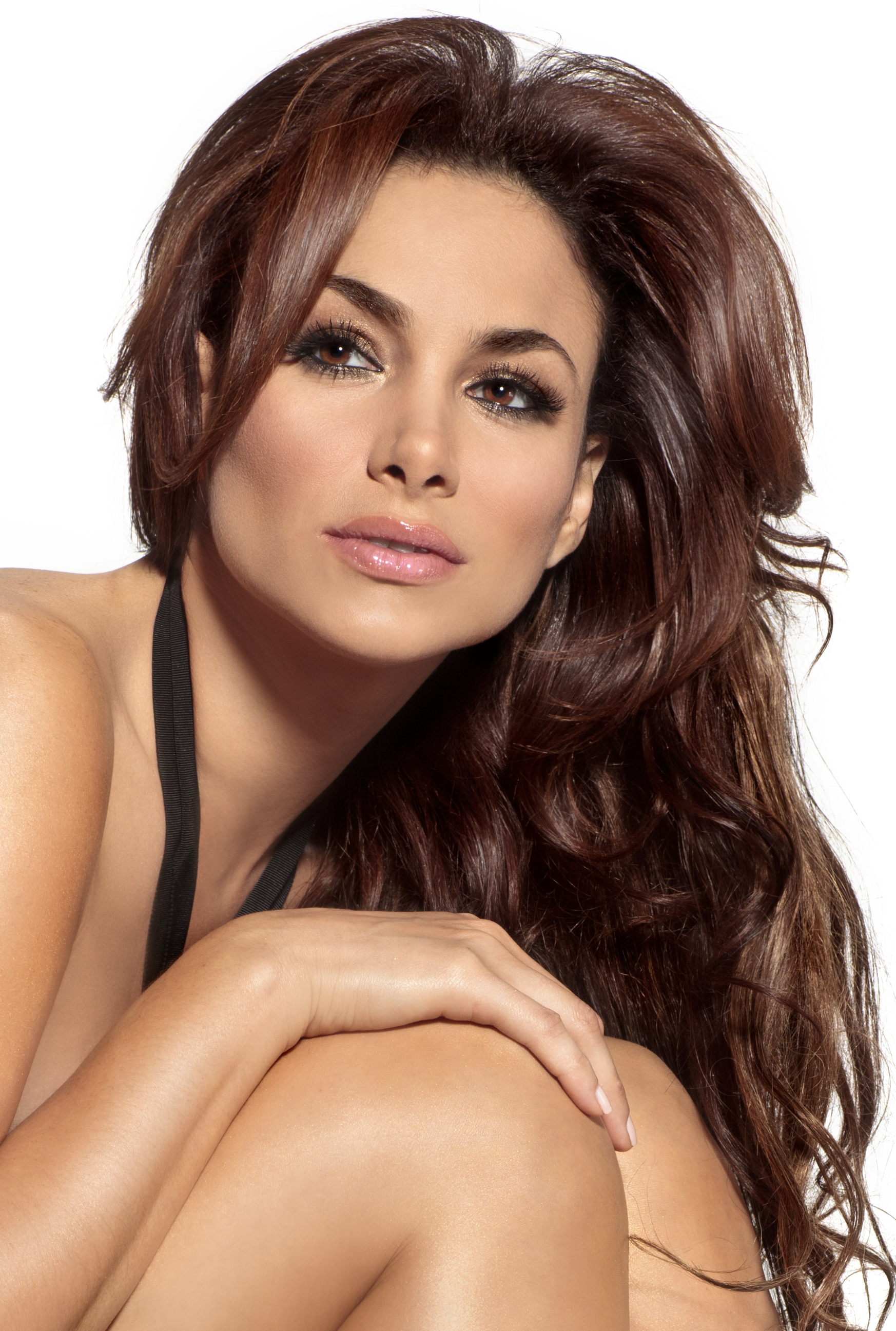
Patricia De León Señorita Panamá Hispanidad

== Final result ==
Final results	Contestant
Señorita Panamá 1995	Panamá Centro - Reyna del Carmen Royo Rivera
Señorita Panamá World	Panamá Centro - Marisela Moreno Montero
Señorita Panamá Hispanidad	Panama City - Patricia De León Barichovicht
1st runner up	Panama City - Giovanna Alida Loaiza
2nd runner up	Panama City - Michelle Krisko Sugasti

=== Special awards ===
Final results	Designer	Topic
Best National Costume to Miss Universe	-	"Pollera Nacional"

== Jury ==
- Giselle Amelia González Aranda: Señorita Panamá 1992
- Charlie Cuevas: Stylist

== Contestants ==
These are the competitors who were this year.

#	Represent	Contestant	Age	Height	Hometown
1	Panama City	Mildred Kincaid Adames	20	1.65	Panama City
2	Panama City	Catherine Henderson Tudisco	20	1.66	Panama City
3	Panama City	Giovanna Alida Loaiza	21	1.67	Panama City
4	Panama City	Reyna del Carmen Royo Rivera	24	1.69	Panama City
5	Panama City	Ivonne Ileana Correa Turney	23	1.70	Panama City
6	Panama City	Karol Guevara	22	1.70	Panama City
7	Panama City	Betzy Janette Achurra Castillo	20	1.70	Panama City
8	Panama City	Marisela Moreno Montero	24	1.73	Panama City
9	Panama City	Patricia De León Barichovicht	19	1.74	Panama City
10	Panama City	Marichelle Julieta Ruiz Leone	20	1.74	Panama City
11	Panama City	Betsy Milena Batista	21	1.75	Panama City
12	Panama City	Lourdes Rodriguez	21	1.75	Panama City
13	Panama City	Janessy Jasiell Contreras Ibarra	18	1.75	Panama City
14	Panama City	Gina Larissa Correa Hils	20	1.76	Panama City
15	Panama City	Swany Cisney Castillo	23	1.78	Panama City
16	Panama City	Michelle Krisko Sugasti	20	1.80	Panama City

== Election schedule ==
- Thursday September Final night, coronation Señorita Panamá 1995

== Candidates Notes ==
- Patricia De León Did not compete in the Miss Hispanidad due to cancellation, but competed in Miss Asia Pacific 1997.
- Karol Guevara competed in Miss Hawaiian Tropic International and won the Miss Photogenic award.
- Betzy Jeannete Achurra was elected Miss Panamá International 1996 and competed in Miss International 1996 held on October 26, 1996 at the Kanazawa Kagekiza in Kanazawa, Ishikawa, Japan.
- Mildred de Carmen Kincaid Adames was elected Miss Panamá Intercontinental 1998 and competed in Miss Intercontinental 1998 in Germany on April 23, 1998.
- Janessy Contreras won the Queen of Panama Carnival in 2002.
- Swany Castillo represented Panama in the Miss Teen Internacional 1996 and placed as 4th Runner-Up.
- Michelle Krisko competed in Nuestra Belleza Internacional 1995 in Miami.

== Historical significance ==
- Panamá Centro won Señorita Panamá for 18th time.
