= Lía Borrero =

Panamanian model

Lía Victoria Borrero
- Born: Lía Victoria Borrero González; August 22, 1976 (age 50); Las Tablas, Los Santos, Panama
- Height: 1.75 m (5 ft 9 in)
- Beauty pageant titleholder
- Title: Señorita Panamá 1996; Miss Panama International 1998; Miss International 1998
- Hair color: Black
- Eye color: Brown
- Major competitions: Señorita Panamá 1996 (Winner); Miss Universe 1997 (Top 6); Miss International 1998 (Winner)

Lía Victoria Borrero González (born August 22, 1976) is a Panamanian model and beauty queen who was the first Panamanian delegate in history to win a major beauty pageant, the title of Miss International 1998.

== Early life ==
Lía won her first beauty contest in early 1996 when she became queen of the Las Tablas carnival, a title that had previously been won by her aunt by the same name Lía Victoria Borrero de Jurado.

== Señorita Panamá ==
She competed in the Miss Panama competition that same year, where she beat other 14 contestants and became Miss Panama 1996. This gave her the opportunity to compete in the Miss Universe 1997 pageant, broadcast live from Miami Beach, Florida.

== Miss Universe ==
She was a Top 6 finalist, the highest placement ever by a Panamanian at the time (a record that would not be surpassed until 2002). Miss USA, Brook Mahealani Lee would be the eventual winner.

== Miss International ==
Later, she was invited to participate in the Miss International 1998 beauty pageant, which is annually held in Japan. On September 26, 1998, she became the first ever Panamanian to win a major international pageant, overcoming other strong delegates such as Venezuela and Colombia. She worked for the International Culture Association (ICA) during her year-long reign, helping the One Love Fund, a foundation that gives donations to people who suffer from natural disasters, through the creation of goodwill activities.

Awards and achievements
Preceded by (Venezuela) Consuelo Adler	Miss International; 1998	Succeeded by (Colombia) Paulina Gálvez
Preceded by Reyna Royo Rivera	Señorita Panamá; 1996	Succeeded by Tanisha Drummond
Vacant Title last held by Betzy Achurra (1996)	Miss Panama International; 1998	Succeeded by Blanca Espinosa
