= Marianela Salazar =

- Born: Marianela Salazar Guillén c. 1978 (age 47–48); Panama City, Panama
- Beauty pageant titleholder
- Title: Señorita Panamá-Miss Asia Pacific 1999
- Hair color: Brunette
- Eye color: Hazel
- Major competitions: Miss Asia Pacific 2000 (first runner-up); Reinado Internacional del Café 2000 (first runner-up); Miss Mesoamerica 2000 (second runner-up)

Marianela Salazar Guillén (born c. 1978), is a Panamanian model and beauty pageant contestant. She is the winner of the title Señorita Panamá-Miss Asia Pacific 1999 in the contest Señorita Panamá 1999 and first Runner-Up in the Miss Asia Pacific 2000.

== Pageantry ==
=== Señorita Panamá 1999 ===
In 1999 she participated in the Señorita Panamá contest, where she placed second. She is the relative of the title Señorita Panamá-Miss Asia Pacific 1999, contest winner for Analía Verónica Núñez Sagripanti who participated in the Miss Universe 2000.

=== Miss Asia Pacific 2000 ===
In 2000 she participated in Miss Asia Pacific 2000, celebrated in Quezon City, Philippines. She won the best swimsuit competition and the final of the event the first runner-up position.

=== Other ===
She also competed in the Reinado Internacional del Café 2000 finishing as first runner-up. In the same year, she competed in the Miss Mesoamerica 2000 contest finishing as second runner-up.

Preceded by Abimelec Rodríguez	Miss Panama Asia Pacific; 1999	Succeeded by Adriana Roquer Hidalgo
