= Reyna Royo =

Panamanian model and beauty pageant

- Born: Reyna del Carmen Royo Rivera; March 15, 1971 (age 55); Panama City, Panama
- Height: 1.69 m (5 ft 6 1/2 in)
- Beauty pageant titleholder
- Title: Miss Panamá Universe 1995
- Hair color: Black
- Eye color: hazel
- Major competitions: Señorita Panamá 1995 (Winner); Miss Universe 1996 (Unplaced).

Reyna del Carmen Royo Rivera (born March 15, 1971) is a Panamanian model and beauty pageant titleholder who was the winner of the Señorita Panamá 1995.

Royo who is 5 ft 6.5 in (1.69 m) tall, competed in the national beauty pageant Señorita Panamá 1995, in September 1995 and obtained the title of Señorita Panamá Universo. She represented Panamá Centro state.

Awards and achievements
Preceded by Michele Sage	Miss Panamá; 1995–1996	Succeeded by Lía Borrero
