= Marisela Moreno =

- Born: Marisela Moreno Montero; August 7, 1972 (age 54); Panama City, Panama
- Height: 1.75 m (5 ft 9 in)
- Spouse: Angel Vallarino
- Children: 2
- Beauty pageant titleholder
- Title: Señorita Panamá Mundo 1995
- Hair color: Brown
- Eye color: Brown
- Major competitions: Miss World 1995 (Unplaced)

Marisela Moreno Montero (born August 7, 1972 in Panama City), is a Panamanian model, beauty pageant titleholder, and winner of the Señorita Panamá Mundo 1995 title. She also represented Panama in the 45th Miss World pageant, which was held at the Entertainment Centre in Sun City, South Africa on November 18, 1995. After being Miss Panama, she became one of the most successful television presenters in Panama. She is also the only Panamanian television presenter who has been the animator of the Viña del Mar Festival in 1998.

Marisela Moreno is co-owner of the television production company E.Motion TV, Ad & Films, creator of the "Authentic Woman" brand ("When you are Authentic you have no competition"), and the owner of the local Panama Canal Zone Magazine.

She has two children and is married to Dr. Angel Vallarino, a dentist.

== Miss World 1995 ==
Representing the state of Distrito Central, Moreno won the title of Señorita Panamá Mundo (Miss Panama World) in September, 1995.

A few months later, on November 18, 1995, in Sun City, South Africa, she and 84 contestants competed for the title of Miss World 1995.

== Life after Miss World ==
Since finishing her reign as Señorita Panamá Mundo, Moreno has appeared on calendars, in commercials, and as host in different events and TV programs. She founded a company named E-motion and in 2010 was named director of Señorita Panamá, acquiring the rights to the contest formerly called Miss Panama and now again called the Official Panamanian Pageant, responsible for choosing Panama's representatives to Miss Universe, Miss Continente Americano, and Miss World.

| Preceded by Carmen Ogando | Miss Panamá World; 1995 | Succeeded by Norma Pérez |
