= Analía Núñez =

Panamanian model and beauty queen

- Born: Analía Verónica Núñez Sagripanti; June 4, 1980 (age 46); David, Chiriquí, Panama
- Height: 1.74 m (5 ft 8 1/2 in)
- Beauty pageant titleholder
- Title: Miss Panama Universe 1999
- Hair color: Brunette
- Eye color: hazel
- Major competitions: Miss Universe 2000 (Unplaced)

Analía Verónica Núñez Sagripanti (born June 4, 1980) is a Panamanian model and beauty pageant titleholder who was the winner of the Señorita Panamá 1999. She also represented Panama in Miss Universe 2000. The 49th Miss Universe pageant was held at Eleftheria Stadium, Nicosia, Cyprus on May 12, 2000. She was 13th overall in preliminaries.

Núñez, who is 5 ft 8.5 in (1.74 m), competed in the national beauty pageant Señorita Panamá 1999, in September 1999 and obtained the title of Señorita Panamá Universo. She represented Chiriquí Province.

As model Analía has taken part in calendars, commercial and as stewardess in different events. She has also taken part in Latin SuperModel Search in the 2000 and the Fashion Week of the Americas.

In 2016, she was one of the guest judges in the finals of Miss Panamá 2016 in the Trump Ocean Club International Hotel and Tower, Panama City, Panama.

Awards and achievements
Preceded by Yamani Saied	Miss Panamá; 1999–2000	Succeeded by Ivette Cordovez
